= History of the Chicago Bears =

Sports team history

The Chicago Bears American football franchise is a charter member of the National Football League (NFL), and has played in all of the league's 100 seasons. The team has captured nine NFL championships – eight NFL championships and one Super Bowl – second most all time behind the Green Bay Packers. The franchise has also recorded the second most victories than any other franchise (809 regular season in the NFL, 18 in the playoffs, and 6 pre-NFL as of the end of the 2025 season), retired the most uniform numbers (14), and have the most members in the Pro Football Hall of Fame (29). The Bears have played in over a thousand games since becoming a charter member of the NFL in 1920.

== Early years: Formation of the league and Bear domination (1919–1946) ==
The Decatur Staleys, the organization that eventually became the Chicago Bears, were originally founded as a works team of the A. E. Staley food starch company of Decatur, Illinois, in 1919; this was the typical start for several early professional football franchises. The team played independently in 1919, winning the Central Illinois Championship. In 1920, the company hired former University of Illinois teammates George Halas and Edward "Dutch" Sternaman to run the team. Halas would be the face of the franchise for the next 62 years.

On September 17, 1920, 13 team representatives, including those representing Halas' team, met in Canton, Ohio, to create a new football league. In the interest of ticket sales and crowning a yearly champion, they decided to form the American Professional Football Association, which changed its name to National Football League (NFL) in 1922. On October 3, 1920, the Staleys played their first NFL game. Official team and league records cite Halas as the team's founder as he took over the team in 1920, when it became a charter member of the NFL.

=== 1920–1921: The Decatur Staleys ===
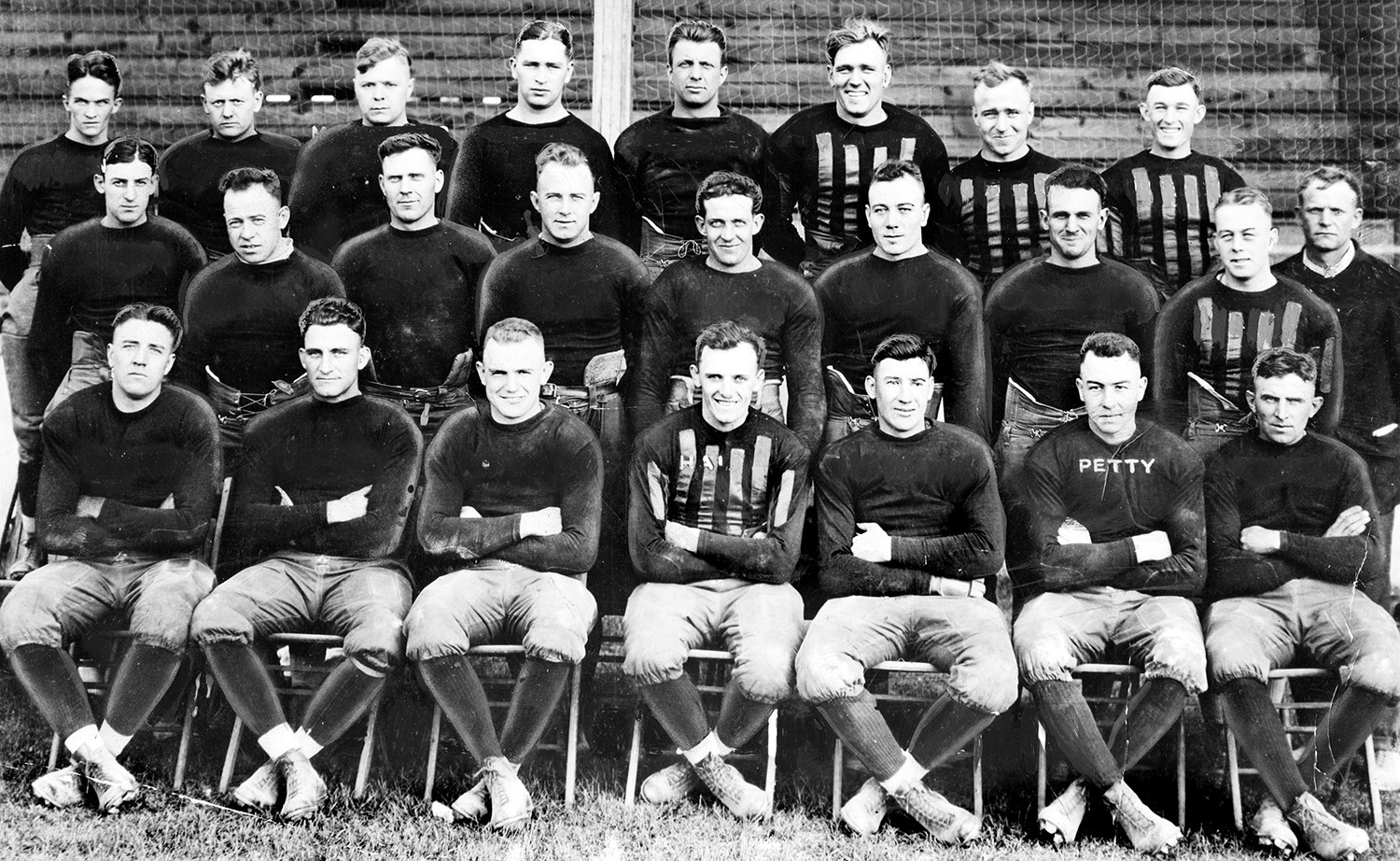
The 1920 Decatur Staleys

Halas was among the driving forces of this meeting, which gave birth to what is now the NFL. In their first season as part of the APFA, the Staleys won 10 games, all by shutouts, but lost the first league championship to the Akron Pros, who finished the season unbeaten at 8–0–3. There was no official scheduling in the 1920 season, which accounted for the difference in the number of games played that season.

The Staleys and the Racine Cardinals split the 1920 series with the home team winning in each. In the Cardinals' 7–6 victory over the Staleys in their first meeting of the season, each team scored a touchdown on a fumble recovery, but the Staleys missed their extra point. The Staleys went on to a 10–1–2 record overall, 5–1–2 in league play. The 1920 Akron Pros were the first-ever league champions, finishing with an 8–0–3 record, 6–0–3 in league play, and ending their season in a scoreless tie against the Staleys. Because the Staleys had lost to the Cardinals earlier that year, the Pros could simply play the final game not to lose; they wisely did and became champions. The Staleys' loss to the Cardinals began a long-standing rivalry between the franchises. Had the Staleys won, there would have been a three-way tie among the Staleys, the Buffalo All-Americans (9–1–1 in 1920, 4–1–1 in league play) and the Pros, each team having one loss. Each team likely would have played more games (as it was allowed under the rules in those days) to allow teams to settle parity at the top of the standings.

=== 1921–1929: First years in Chicago and the rise of the Bears ===
Although the Staleys made a good account of themselves on the field, they struggled off of it. The team played their home games at Staley Field, which only seated 1,500 people, incredibly small even by early professional football standards. Additionally, Staley employees received a 50 percent discount on tickets, further hobbling the company's bottom line.

In 1921, the Staleys relocated from Decatur to Chicago.

The financial troubles did not dissuade Halas from improving the team. By the time the team took the field for the 1921 season, Halas had almost completely jettisoned the Staleys' works team roots. All but two local men and one Staley employee were gone from the roster and replaced with former college players. After the team opened the season with a home victory over the Rock Island Independents, company founder and namesake Gene Staley made Halas a lucrative offer. He was going to have to lay off the players he had just hired due to a recession, but was willing to turn the team over to Halas. Remembering that the team had attracted its biggest home game crowds of the 1920 season by moving two games to the city, Staley advanced Halas $5,000 to move the team to Chicago, provided he keep the Staleys name for the remainder of the 1921 season. Halas then took Sternaman on as a full partner. Taking advantage of his good relationship with William Wrigley Jr. and Bill Veeck Sr. (owner and president of the Chicago Cubs, respectively) , Halas quickly secured a lease at Cubs Park, soon to be known as Wrigley Field. The Chicago Staleys stormed through the rest of the season, finishing 10–1–1 with their first league championship.

In 1922, when the agreement to keep the Staleys name lapsed, Halas decided to choose a new name for his team. He considered calling it the Cubs as a nod to how the baseball Cubs had helped him get settled in Chicago, but ultimately decided on the Chicago Bears. In his biography, Halas recalled that he wanted a tie-in to the Cubs, but reasoned that since football players were far bigger than baseball players, "if baseball players are cubs, then football players must be bears!" Over the next few years, the Bears were ranked among the elite teams in the NFL, but could never capture a championship title since the league did not have a playoff system; instead, it had a somewhat controversial scheduling formula that led to uneven standings and contentious champions.

The highlight of the decade was Halas' unprecedented move to sign Red Grange for $100,000 in 1925. At that time, professional football was viewed negatively by many Americans, who saw college football as a pure sport. Halas, however, took the Bears on a 17-game road trip across the United States to highlight Grange. The tour began on Thanksgiving at Wrigley Field as the Chicago Cardinals battled to a 0–0 tie. However, during the tour that continued through January 31, the Bears posted an impressive 11–4–2 record. This road trip impressed many and boosted the prospects of many debt-ridden teams, such as the New York Giants.

The Bears ended the decade with a losing season as Halas retired as player-coach and appointed Ralph Jones as his successor.

=== 1930–1939: NFL championships and George Halas' return ===
The 1932 Chicago Bears

The Chicago Bears of the 1930s are remembered for being led by Bronko Nagurski and Red Grange, playing in the newly inaugurated NFL Championship Game four times and claiming the league title twice.

After completing the 1930 season with a record of 9–4–1, the Bears and the Chicago Cardinals played the first indoor football game on December 15 at Chicago Stadium in a charity game for those affected by the Great Depression, a game the Bears won 9–7. Due to the size limitations of the arena, the length of the football field was only 80 yards. In the 1932 season, the Bears and the Portsmouth Spartans tied for first place in the league, and played an "unofficial" championship playoff game at Chicago Stadium on December 18. The Bears won 9–0 and captured the championship before 11,198 fans. The popularity of the game prompted the NFL to institute various rule changes for the 1933 season, splitting the league into two geographical divisions and establishing an officially scheduled Championship Game to determine the NFL champion.

In 1933, George Halas made his return to coaching the Bears, leading them to the first-ever Western Division title and the first-ever NFL Championship Game. The Bears again captured the Championship 23–21 in a nail-biter against the New York Giants as Red Grange made a game-winning tackle. In 1934, the Bears dominated the league and finished 13–0, but were denied perfection as they lost 30–13 to the Giants in the Championship Game, which became known as the "Sneakers Game".

The Bears would play in the NFL Championship Game two more times that decade, losing both of them. In 1935 and 1936, the Bears remained somewhat competitive, but failed to qualify for the Championship. In 1937, they made a return to the Championship Game, but fell short as Sammy Baugh and the Washington Redskins won 28–21. In 1938, the Bears fell off the NFL map, with a record of 6–5. The Bears finished off the decade on a down note, losing twice to the Green Bay Packers in 1939.

During the late 1930s, George Halas and University of Chicago football coach Clark Shaughnessy collaborated on a revolutionary approach to the offense and the quarterback position. The result was the T-formation offense and the first evolution of the modern quarterback. A complex scheme that required an athletic player with quick decision skills led Halas to recruit Columbia University quarterback Sid Luckman, who turned the position into an engine for a high powered, time-consuming scoring machine.

=== 1940–1946: The "Monsters of the Midway" ===
The 1946 Chicago Bears

The T-formation that the Bears innovated in their 73–0 win over the Washington Redskins in the 1940 NFL Championship

The Chicago Bears from 1940 to 1946 were considered a dynasty, earning the nickname of "Monsters of the Midway". In this span, the Bears went to five NFL Championships and won four of them, even as head coach George Halas temporarily left the organization to serve in World War II from 1943 to 1945.

In the 1940 NFL Championship, Halas introduced the T-formation offense, with Sid Luckman as quarterback. This formation shocked and confused the Washington Redskins all day as the Bears won 73–0, an NFL record that stands to this day. The T-formation was soon widely copied at college and pro levels. In 1941, the Bears and the Green Bay Packers battled to a 10–1–0 tie for first place in the Western Division. Since the teams split their two regular season match-ups, which turned out to be each team's only loss of the season, a one-game playoff was set up. The Bears won 33–14, moving on to rout the New York Giants 37–9 in the 1941 NFL Championship.

The Bears started the 1942 season well before Halas departed for World War II. 45 players on the team also joined the war effort, which led to a roster shortage that nearly led to the Bears merging with the Cardinals in 1943. Halas' handpicked successors Hunk Anderson and Luke Johnsos ran the Bears for the next three years until his return. The Bears finished the 1942 season 11–0 and played against the Washington Redskins in the 1942 Championship Game. The Redskins spoiled the Bears' attempt at a perfect season, with a 14–6 upset preventing the Bears from three-peating. In the 1943 season, the Bears dominated the Western Division behind the quarterbacking of Luckman, who threw for 433 yards and seven touchdowns that season in a single game against the New York Giants. In the 1943 Championship Game, the Redskins were no challenge to the Bears, who won 41–21 before a crowd of 34,320 at Wrigley Field behind Luckman's five touchdowns and Nagurski's final touchdown run.

The Bears' domination took a slight fall in as they posted a mediocre result in 1944 and a losing season in 1945. After Halas returned to the team in 1946 and many players returned from service in the war, the team was able to find their old magic again, finishing the regular season 8–2–1 to claim another Western Division title and a return trip to the Championship Game. The Bears won their last NFL Championship of the decade over the New York Giants 24–14 before a record crowd of 58,346 at the Polo Grounds in New York; this would be the Bears' last Championship for the next 16 years.

== Middle years: The rough years (1947–1981) ==
During this span of 34 seasons, the Bears had a combined record of 237–224–9, and finished 17 of those seasons with a record of .500 or better. Out of those 17 seasons, they won the NFL Western Division twice and qualified for the playoffs only five times, losing the 1956 Championship but winning the 1963 Championship. Despite these rough years, players like Gale Sayers and Dick Butkus thrived in their careers.

=== 1947–1959: The decline from the top ===
In 1947, the Bears got off to a slow start by losing their first two games. The team rebounded, however, and quickly ran off an eight-game winning streak to get back into the race for first place in the Western Division. After losing to the Los Angeles Rams 17–14 in the second-to-last game of the season, the Bears and the Chicago Cardinals faced off in the final game of the season, with the Western Division title on the line. The Cardinals would stun the Bears 30–21 en route to the NFL Championship. In 1948, for the second season in a row, the Bears put together another great regular season, but fell short to their inner city rival Cardinals. The Bears posted a 10–2 record, but lost a key game against the Cardinals that gave them the Western Division Championship.

In 1949, the Bears continued to be one of the best-performing teams in the NFL, but fell a game short of making the Championship again. Their success continued into 1950, as they began the new decade in style by finishing 9–3, enough to earn them a tie for the Western Division with the Los Angeles Rams, whom they played against in the Conference Playoff. However, the Bears were unable to slow down the high-powered Ram offense in a 24–14 loss in Los Angeles as the Rams advanced to the Championship Game.

The Bears got off to a streaking start in the 1951 season, winning five of their first six games. However, the magic faded in the second half of the season as they won only two of their final six games, finishing fourth place in the conference with a mediocre record of 7–5. In the 1952 season, the Bears' defense struggled as they allowed a wretched 326 points and finished below .500 for the first time since 1945, coming in fifth place with a record of 5–7. The team's struggles continued into 1953, as most of their superstars from their 1940s dynasty had retired by this point. That season the Bears finished 3–8–1, posting back-to-back losing seasons for the first time in their history. A notable occurrence in the 1953 season was the NFL's first modern-era African-American quarterback Willie Thrower playing his first and only game for the Bears against the San Francisco 49ers. In 1954, the Bears got back into the league playoff picture by posting a solid record of 8–4, enough for second place in the division but not for an appearance in the Championship Game.

In 1955, the Bears posted a second consecutive 8–4 season, again in second place, while head coach George Halas called it quits for the third time in his career. He was replaced by former team standout Paddy Driscoll, whose success would be highlighted in his first season with the team. In 1956, Driscoll led the Bears through a solid 9–2–1 season, as they beat their fellow Midwest rival, the Detroit Lions, by a half a game for the 1956 Western Division Championship. The magical season ended sourly, however, as the Bears were no match for the New York Giants in the 1956 NFL Championship, as the Bears were blasted in a 47–7 rout in New York City. The magic of the championship season was short-lived, as in 1957 the Bears dropped from first to below .500 with a 5–7 record, prompting Halas to quickly fire Driscoll and return to the sidelines.

In 1958, following Halas' return, the Bears rebounded off the disappointing losing season by challenging for the Western Division Championship before faltering at the end of the season and finishing in a second place tie with an 8–4 record, a game away from the 1958 Championship. The Bears closed out the decade with yet another 8–4 finish that was only enough for second place in the division in 1959. The decade gave way to Bears greats such as Ed "the Claw" Sprinkle, Bill George, George Connor, and Harlon Hill.

The 1950s marked the first time in their history that the Bears went an entire decade without winning an NFL Championship. Halas, found a young assistant in George Allen, a young coach who quickly created innovations such as thick playbooks for training camps, and exhaustive research for the NFL draft. With the support of Halas, Allen turned the draft into a windfall for future Hall of Fame talent.

=== 1960–1970: Rookie success and one more championship for Halas ===
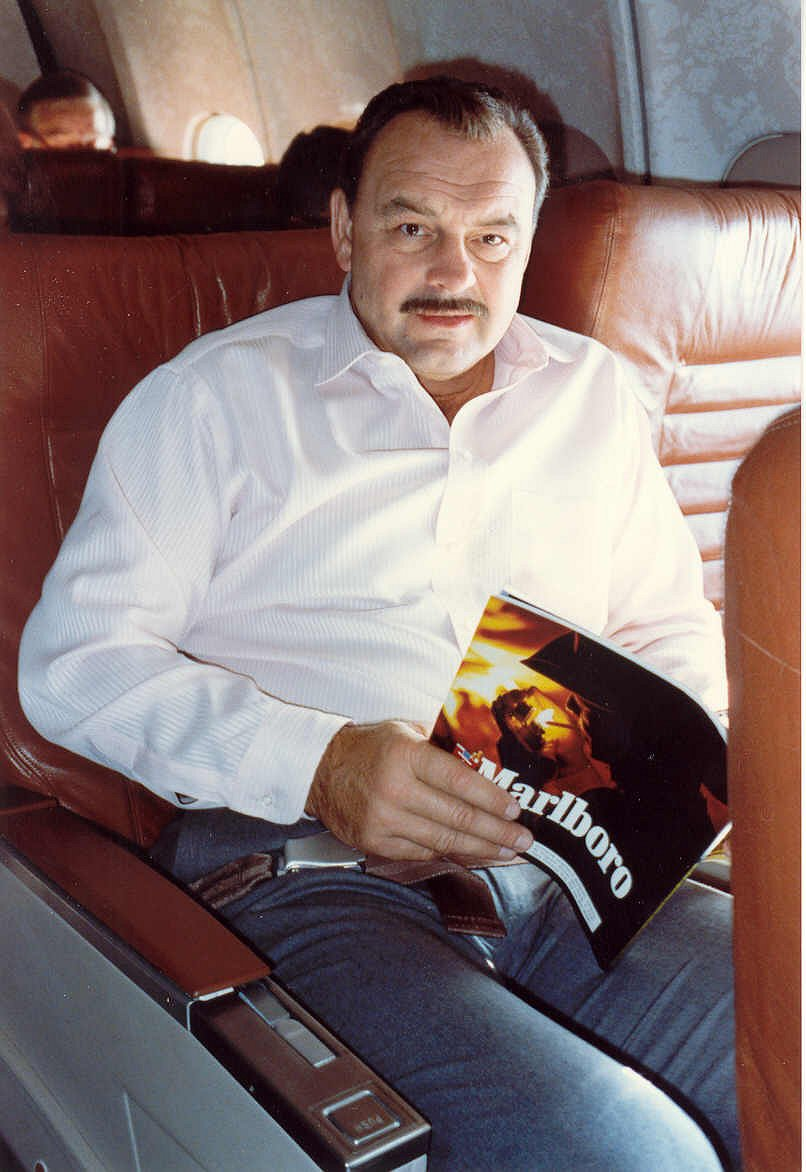
Dick Butkus (pictured in 1995) was one of the most dominating of the Bears players.

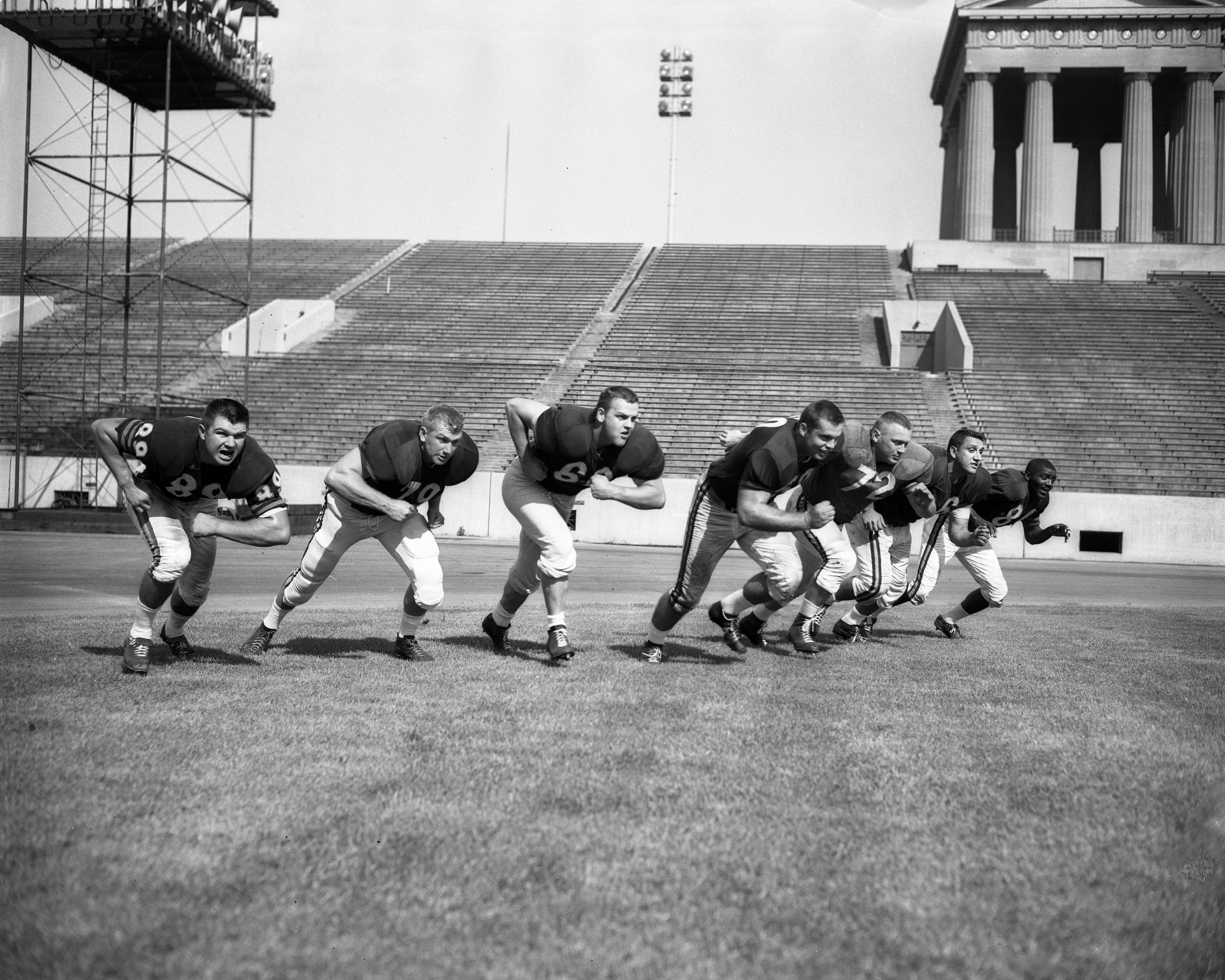
The Bears offensive line practicing for the 1961 Armed Forces Benefit Football Game at Soldier Field. The team would later move to the stadium full-time in 1971.

The Bears started off the 1960s as the only team in Chicago following the Cardinals' move to St. Louis. In the 1960 season, the Bears finished a disappointing 5–6–1 in fifth place in the NFL Western Conference. In the 1961 season, the Bears rebounded off a losing season to finish in fourth place in the conference with a record of 8–6, as rookie tight end Mike Ditka made an instant impact by collecting 1,076 receiving yards and 12 touchdowns, setting a team record for rookies with 56 receptions, while winning the NFL Rookie of the Year Award. The Bears also made their first trip out of American soil into Canada to take on the Canadian Football League (CFL)'s Montreal Alouettes (the original franchise) in a game that the Bears won 34–16.

The 1962 season was the second that saw a rookie who would make an immediate impact with the team–in this case, running back Ronnie Bull, who went on to win the Rookie of the Year Award as the Bears finished in third place in the conference with a solid 9–5 record. The Bears' rookie success hit a pinnacle in 1963, when they broke the Green Bay Packers' three-year stranglehold on the Western Division and the NFL by posting an 11–1–2 record. In the 1963 NFL Championship Game at Wrigley Field, the Bears battled the New York Giants in front of 45,801 fans on a bone-chilling afternoon, winning their eighth Championship 14–10 as Bill Wade scored both touchdowns for the Bears. However, the star of the game was the Bears' dominating defense, which intercepted Giants star quarterback Y. A. Tittle a stunning five times. The following season, the Bears followed up their Championship title with an underachieving 5–9 season, leading Halas to search for young talent in the upcoming draft. He selected running back Gale Sayers (nicknamed the "Kansas Comet") and linebacker Dick Butkus in the first round of the draft to improve the Bears' offense and defense.

The 1965 season proved to be yet another year where a rookie made an impact for the Bears, as Sayers won the Rookie of the Year Award while establishing a new record of 22 touchdowns during the season, still a team record. His record season and his entire career would be highlighted by his six-touchdown performance against the San Francisco 49ers at Wrigley Field on December 12. The new element of Sayers helped the Bears finish the season in third place with a 9–5 record. Sayers continued his offensive successes in 1966, with a record 2,440 all-purpose yards, but the team still finished with a 5–7–2 season. Meanwhile, Mike Ditka abruptly retired at the end of the season, dissatisfied with Halas' unwillingness to spend money on talent; he would become an assistant coach for the Dallas Cowboys under Tom Landry.

The year 1967 not only saw the NFL's first Super Bowl, but also the final retirement of George Halas (then 72 years old), 47 years after his first season with the team. At the time of his retirement, Halas had 324 coaching wins, a record that stood until 1993, when it was broken by Don Shula. In Halas' final season, the Bears played respectably with a 7–6–1 record and a second-place finish in the Central Division. Halas stated that he did not retire from coaching because of his age, but because the hip injury he had sustained as a baseball player made it almost impossible for him to stand on the sidelines during games.

With Jim Dooley's appointment in Halas' place, the Bears finished the 1968 season with a 7–7 record. The low point of the season, however, was a career-threatening knee injury to Gale Sayers, from which he never fully recovered. After Sayers' injury, running back Brian Piccolo did not believe he deserved the job because of the injury. Instead of running away with his opportunity as most athletes would, Piccolo, a popular figure in the Chicago area who roomed with Sayers for a few years on road trips, pushed Sayers to get his knee back into football playing shape during the 1969 off-season. Sayers got back into the lineup, and Piccolo was back on the bench when the 1969 season started. Sayers rushed for 1,032 yards and earned the NFL Comeback Player of the Year Award. This was the ultimate display of friendship between Piccolo and Sayers, who were friends despite race differences in society during the 1960s. Even with Sayers' performance, the Bears finished the 1969 season with a franchise-worst 1–13 record. Their hopes worsened due to the fact that they had the number-two pick, while the Pittsburgh Steelers had the first overall pick (with the Bears defeating them), allowing them to draft future Hall of Famer Terry Bradshaw.

The horror of the season came in November 1969, when Piccolo began suffering breathing problems and was diagnosed with lung cancer. On June 16, 1970, seven months after his diagnosis, Piccolo died from lung cancer at the age of 26. The Bears responded by setting up the Brian Piccolo Cancer Research Fund, which raises money through various annual events for cancer research. In 1971, ABC aired the television film Brian's Song, which starred James Caan as Piccolo and Billy Dee Williams as Gale Sayers, and detailed the friendship between the two running backs.

=== 1970–1975: Move to Soldier Field ===
Following the merger between the NFL and the American Football League (AFL), the 1970s began with the end of an era for the NFL, especially for the Bears. The sport, which once lagged behind baseball and college football in terms of popularity, was seeing a huge rise with the advent of the Super Bowl, with bigger venues being needed to support fans. Wrigley Field (which was also the home of Major League Baseball (MLB)'s Chicago Cubs) had been the Bears' home stadium for nearly 50 years, but it did not measure up to the NFL's new guidelines, which required all stadiums to seat at least 50,000. After winning their final game at Wrigley 35–17 against the Green Bay Packers on December 13, 1970 (and finishing the season fourth place with a record of 6–8), the Bears moved into Soldier Field (which had opened in 1924 and once hosted their former crosstown rivals, the Chicago Cardinals, in 1959) on the Near South Side of Chicago, and played their first game there against the Pittsburgh Steelers on September 19, 1971, which they won 17–15. However, the Bears ended up finishing their first season at the stadium with a record of 6–8, leading to the termination of head coach Jim Dooley.

Dooley's replacement Abe Gibron did not start his tenure any better with the Bears, who were last place in the NFC Central division with a record of 4–9–1. The Gibron era took a deeper dive during the 1973 season as the team finished in last place again with a record of 3–11, limited to just 195 total points during the entire season. Dick Butkus, who had terrorized enemy offensive players for the last eight years, retired early in the season after being hobbled by knee injuries. The 1974 season would be Gibron's last with the Bears, who finished yet again in last place, this time with a record of 4–10. The Gibron era was marked with a combined record of 11–30–1, with the only memorable event from that era being Gibron's appearance in an NFL Films production where he was taped singing "Joy to the World", not paying attention to the game in front of him.

=== 1975–1982: Building for a championship ===
Halas made the Bears' football decisions for his first 54 years in the organization. When he named his son and heir apparent, George "Mugs" Halas Jr. as team president in 1963, he nominally gave the general mamager's post to Mugs as well. By 1974, Halas saw the need to modernize and decided to entrust the rebuilding of the Bears to former Minnesota Vikings general manager Jim Finks, whom he named general manager while Mugs Halas remained president.

In 1975, Finks brought in Jack Pardee to coach, marking the first time in Bears history that the team hired a head coach who had not previously been either a Bears player or assistant coach. The move did not have any initial impact, as the team finished the season 4–10. The best move of the year was the drafting of running back Walter Payton (nicknamed "Sweetness") in the first round, who would come to be known as one of the Bears' greatest players. The string of losing seasons ended in 1976, with Payton rushing for 1,390 yards while scoring 13 touchdowns. At the end of the season, the Bears posted a 7–7 record, landing in second place. That same season, the Bears debuted their cheerleading squad, the Honey Bears. Despite the squad's success, Halas' daughter Virginia Halas McCaskey terminated the group in 1985 after Super Bowl XX, starting claims of a "Honey Bear Curse".

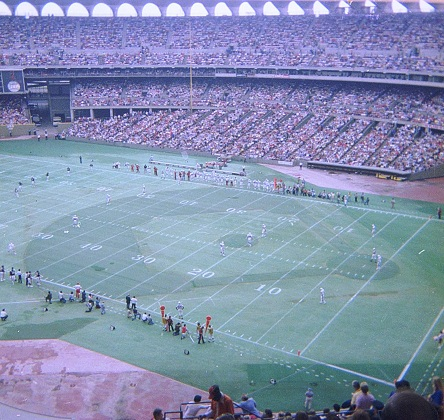
The Chicago Bears in a game against the St. Louis Cardinals at Busch Memorial Stadium, 1977

Payton had a breakout year in 1977, rushing for a team record of 1,852 yards, highlighted by a single-game performance of 275 yards, which established a single-game record that would stand for the next two decades. That same year, Payton won the NFL Offensive Player of the Year Award and the NFL MVP Award. Behind the performance of Payton, the Bears won their final six games of the season to finish second place with a 9–5 record, which landed them in the NFC Wild Card spot. However, they were outpowered and overmatched in their first playoff game since 1963, as the eventual Super Bowl champion, the Dallas Cowboys, defeated them 37–7 in Dallas. At the end of the season, Pardee left the Bears to take over the coaching reins of the Washington Redskins. He was replaced by Minnesota Vikings defensive coordinator Neill Armstrong, whose first season proved to be a step backwards from the Bears' playoff appearance, with a 7–9 record. The Bears would be more successful in the 1979 season, but tragedy struck the team as the Bears were celebrating their playoff berth.

On December 16, 1979, as the Bears earned that spot on the final day of the season with a 42–6 victory over the St. Louis Cardinals, team president George "Mugs" Halas Jr. died of a heart attack at the age of 54. "Mugs", the oldest son and heir apparent of George Sr., had served as the team president since 1963. The Bears had to regroup quickly, as they would face the Philadelphia Eagles in the Wild Card Game in Philadelphia a week later. The Bears held a 17–10 lead in the early moments of the second half, only to see the Eagles soar back, moving on to the next round with a 27–17 victory. The Bears did not return to the playoffs under Armstrong, and in 1980, they fell below .500 with a 7–9 record (despite some seminal moments in Bear lore). On October 6, 1980, Payton broke the Bears' all-time franchise all-purpose yardage total previously held by Gale Sayers, with 9,462 career yards. On Thanksgiving in Detroit, Dave Williams took the overtime kickoff 95 yards for a touchdown, setting an NFL record for the fastest end to an overtime game. On December 7, the Bears ripped the Green Bay Packers 61–7, the biggest margin of victory in the series and the most one-sided game in the history of the Bears-Packers rivalry. Armstrong lasted just one more year with the Bears, finishing with a last place showing and a 6–10 record before being fired in the off-season.

By the end of the 1970s, the beginnings of a front office brain trust were in place. General manager Jim Finks was building the foundation of a championship team; scout Bill Tobin had a knack for finding overlooked talent in the NFL draft; and defensive coordinator Buddy Ryan was beginning to formulate his revolutionary "46 Defense". As with earlier innovations involving the T-formation with Clark Shaughnessy and later creative ideas with George Allen, the pieces began to fit into place for a championship run.

== The Ditka era: Bears renaissance (1982–1992) ==
"Give me three years, and if you walk with me, we'll go to the dance."
~Mike Ditka's first words to the team

Early in 1982, George Halas summoned Mike Ditka back from Dallas and offered him the head coaching job, which he accepted. Under Ditka, the Bears recorded a record of 112–68. After Halas, Ditka became the second Bears coach to record over 100 wins as coach. In addition, the Bears won six division titles and made three trips to the NFC championship. The peak of this era was the 1985 season, where the Bears won Super Bowl XX.

The 1982 season was Ditka's first as the Bears' head coach, as he began his rebuilding program by drafting Jim McMahon from Brigham Young University with the intention of making him a franchise quarterback. The season was interrupted by a players' strike and shortened to nine games. As a result, the NFL held a special playoff tournament involving the top eight teams in both conferences. The Bears did not qualify for the postseason, finishing in 12th place with a 3–6 record.

On October 31, 1983, George Halas died of pancreatic cancer at the age of 88; he was the last surviving NFL founder. The death of Halas also brought the addition of the initials "GSH" on the left sleeve of the Bears' uniforms. With Mugs Halas having passed four years earlier, his elder sister Virginia Halas McCaskey and her husband Ed assumed ownership of the team. Virginia only held 22 percent of the stock, but had the right to vote the shares of her children and grandchildren as well, effectively giving her controlling interest.

In Ditka's second season, the Bears improved and finished with a record of 8–8. The 1983 draft was a critical one, as it saw the core of the Bears' 1985 championship team arrive.

In 1984, Walter Payton broke Jim Brown's all-time career rushing record (which pleased Brown, who had threatened to come out of retirement if Pittsburgh Steelers running back Franco Harris broke the record; Brown disliked Harris's tendency to run out of bounds to avoid oncoming rushers)., Payton's record stood for eighteen years until it was broken by Emmitt Smith in 2002. The Bears finished the season with a 10–6 record to win their first NFC Central Division Championship. Even though the Bears won the division, they struggled toward the end of the season, which cost them a playoff home game. Instead, in the divisional playoffs, the Bears played against the Washington Redskins at Robert F. Kennedy Memorial Stadium in a game they won 23–19, ending the Redskins' quest for a third straight Super Bowl appearance. The Bears advanced to the NFC championship to play the San Francisco 49ers, who shut the Bears out 23–0 on their way to Super Bowl XIX, and also humiliated the Bears by sending in guard Guy McIntyre to play fullback.

=== 1985: Super Bowl champions ===
1985 is the most celebrated year in Chicago Bears history. Through various rankings, the 1985 Bears have been marked as one of the top five NFL teams of all time, as they beat the first 12 of their opponents, outscoring their opponents 456–198.

The 1985 Bears used the 46 defense created by defensive coordinator Buddy Ryan.

The season brought players to the national spotlight such as William "The Refrigerator" Perry, Mike Singletary, Jim McMahon, Dan Hampton, and Walter Payton. In week three of the season, McMahon suffered through a back injury, but the Bears managed to overcome a 17–9 deficit to beat the Minnesota Vikings. Eventually, in week nine, the Bears beat the 49ers 26–10, sacking Joe Montana a seven times. In week 11, the Bears handed the Dallas Cowboys their worst home loss in franchise history, beating them 44–0 and clinching the division for Chicago. In week 12, the Bears suffered their only defeat, a 38–24 loss to the Miami Dolphins, retaining their status as the lone team to have ever had a perfect season. Around this time, the Bears filmed a music video called "The Super Bowl Shuffle". In the divisional playoffs, the Bears shut out the New York Giants 21–0 on a bitterly cold and windy afternoon. The Bears then faced the Los Angeles Rams in the NFC championship in another shutout, winning 24–0 and advancing to the Super Bowl.

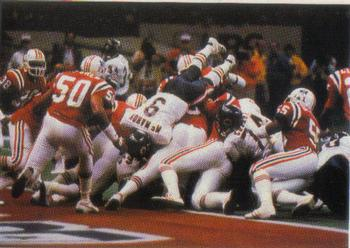
The Bears making a rushing play in the end zone against the Patriots during Super Bowl XX

In Super Bowl XX, the Bears were heavily favored to beat the New England Patriots. The Bears started shakily as Payton fumbled deep in Bears territory. On the subsequent possession, the Patriots were unable to advance the football and had to settle for a field goal, taking a 3–0 lead. However, their lead was short-lived as the Bears struck back by scoring the next 44 points, including a touchdown by Perry. The Bears won the game 46–10, capturing their first NFL championship since 1963 (three years prior to the birth of the Super Bowl), and setting Super Bowl records for points and margin of victory, with defensive end Richard Dent being named the Super Bowl MVP.

=== 1986–1992: Post-Super Bowl years ===
In 1986, the Bears' defense was even stingier coming off the Super Bowl, establishing a record low for 187 points allowed as they finished with another NFC Central title and a 14–2 record. The Bears' attempt to defend their Super Bowl title took a blow when Jim McMahon suffered an injury from an illegal hit by Packers defender Charles Martin. McMahon threw an interception and was slammed into the turf by Martin, injuring his shoulder and ending his season, which had already been subpar. Doug Flutie took over, but proved to be ineffective as the Bears were shocked by the Washington Redskins in the divisional playoffs, 27–13. A notable game that season was the inaugural American Bowl, the first Bears game outside of North America, with the team defeating the Dallas Cowboys 17–6 at Wembley Stadium in London.

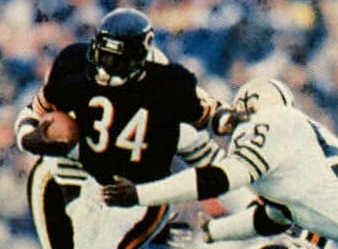
Payton set several franchise and NFL records in rushing during his 13-season career with the Bears.

As the 1980s wore on, other teams began to gradually figure out the 46 defense. Offensive coordinators learned it was vulnerable to a short passing game, particularly the one devised by Bill Walsh of the San Francisco 49ers (later referred to as the West Coast offense). The Bears also failed to draft proper replacements for aging starters.

The 1987 season brought a month-long strike that included the use of replacement players for three games. Off-field turmoil ensued when the Bears drafted quarterback Jim Harbaugh in the first round as a possible replacement for the injury-prone Jim McMahon, who was offended by this and quarreled with head coach Mike Ditka. The latter, meanwhile, unwisely took the side of the NFL during the strike, damaging relations with his team. Even with the replacements, the Bears continued to dominate the NFC Central division, winning their fourth straight NFC Central title and achieving an 11–4 record (the strike resulted in a 15-game season), but ended the year on an embarrassing note as they were destroyed by the San Francisco 49ers 41–0. That season, however, was remembered as the end of an era, as Walter Payton retired after 13 seasons where he only missed one game; Payton had rushed for an all-time career record of 16,726 yards.

The Bears earned a divisional playoff rematch against the Washington Redskins. The Bears jumped out to a 14–0 lead early on only to see the Redskins storm back and take a 21–17 lead late in the game. As time was winding down on the season and on Payton's career, the Bears need to score a touchdown late. The ball was in the hands of Payton who tried to extend his career, but on fourth down he was shoved out of bounds a yard short of the first down marker, allowing the Redskins to run the clock out. Payton watched the rest of the game alone on the bench.

In the 1988 season, the Bears kept on rolling, winning their fifth straight division title with a 12–4 record and earning home-field advantage throughout the playoffs. In a divisional playoffs game on New Year's Eve, the Bears faced the Philadelphia Eagles and former defensive coordinator Buddy Ryan in a game that would be known as the "Fog Bowl". Late in the second quarter, fog began to roll in from Lake Michigan before immersing Soldier Field by the third quarter, which made viewing the game impossible. Nonetheless, the Bears emerged with a 20–12 victory over the Eagles. However, the Bears lost the NFC Championship game the following week 28–3 to the eventual Super Bowl XXIII champion, the San Francisco 49ers.

The 1989 season started with a deal that sent Jim McMahon to the San Diego Chargers. The move was made as McMahon fell out of favor with Mike Ditka and the Bears' front office with his behavior and repeated injuries. This gave the starting job to Mike Tomczak, who had already seen considerable playing time as McMahon regularly missed games due to various injuries. This change did not help the Bears, who finished the season 6–10 and missed a sixth consecutive division title.

The Bears came into the 1990 season bouncing back from a lackluster season to finish in first place with an 11–5 record. During the season, Ditka earned legendary status when he coached the team again just 10 days after suffering a heart attack. This was referenced several times on the Saturday Night Live sketch "Bill Swerski's Superfans". However, a change in the playoff system caused the Bears a three seed to play in a wild card game to get to the divisional playoffs. In the first-ever NFC 3 vs. 6 game, the Bears defeated the New Orleans Saints 16–6 to advance to a divisional playoff showdown against the New York Giants, who defeated the Bears 31–3 and went on to win Super Bowl XXV.

The Bears made a return trip to the playoffs in 1991 with an 11–5 record in a season that saw Ditka earn his 100th career-coaching win. The Bears did not win the division, but made the playoffs as a wild card qualifier. In the wild card round, the Bears were defeated by the Dallas Cowboys 17–13.

The 1992 season saw the end of an era in Chicago. The Bears suffered their worst record of Ditka's tenure, finishing 5–11. As a result, the Ditka era ended as team president Mike McCaskey fired him and hired Dave Wannstedt. Another era that ended that season came with the retirement of Hall of Famer Mike Singletary, who was named NFL Defensive Player of the Year.

== 1993–2003: The Wannstedt/Jauron years ==
For the next 11 seasons, the Bears had a record of 76–103 and posted three seasons above .500. Twice the Bears qualified for the postseason, with only one playoff win. In this same span, they placed first in their division only once.

=== 1993–1998: Dave Wannstedt era ===
In Dave Wannstedt's first season as head coach, the Bears finished with a record of 7–9. During the 1993 season, the Bears played their 1,000th franchise game and beat the Atlanta Falcons 6–0 at Soldier Field. In 1994, the Bears put together a 9–7 season, and earned a trip to the playoffs. In the wild card round, the Bears defeated the NFC Central Division champion, the Minnesota Vikings, 35–18. The Bears' success did not last long as they were beaten badly by the eventual Super Bowl XXIX champions, the San Francisco 49ers, 44–15 in San Francisco. In the 1995 season, the Bears again finished 9–7, but missed the playoffs due to a loss in a tiebreaker with the Atlanta Falcons. In the 1996 season, the Bears took a step backwards under Wannstedt and finished in third place with a record of 7–9.

The Bears declined further in the 1997 season, losing their first seven games with a 4–12 record. One of the few highlights of the season was the Bears winning their 600th victory against the Tampa Bay Buccaneers, becoming the first franchise to achieve such a feat. The Bears had a setback when their game at the Miami Dolphins on October 26 was pushed to the following Monday night after Pro Player Stadium was needed to host game seven of the 1997 World Series, but the Bears managed to come back and beat the Dolphins 36–33 in overtime for their first win of the season. The 1998 season would be the Bears' last under Wannstedt, as they again finished 4–12. After the season, Wannstedt was fired and McCaskey was reassigned by his mother Virginia, the daughter of George Halas.

=== 1999–2003: Dick Jauron era ===
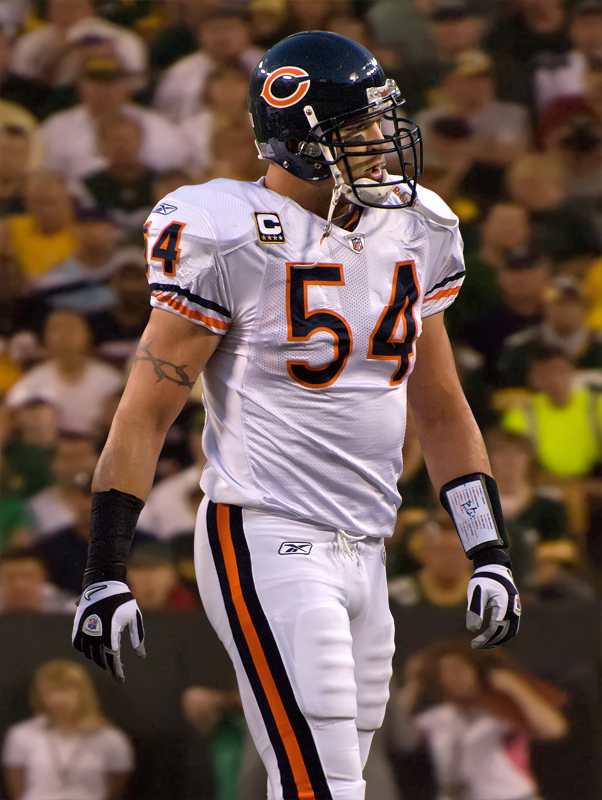
The Bears drafted Brian Urlacher in 2000.

For the 1999 season, the Bears hired Dick Jauron as their next head coach. The decade ended with Jauron's first season at 6–10. That same year, on November 1, former Bears running back Walter Payton died from cholangiocarcinoma at the age of 45.

The Bears began the 2000 season and the new decade on a sour note. After losing their first four games, the Bears finally won their first game of the season on the road against their historic rival, the Green Bay Packers. However, the Bears could not build off that win and lost their next three games. After the bye-week, they won against the Indianapolis Colts in week 10. Out of the remaining seven games, they would win three. Although the team ended the season 5–11, rookie linebacker Brian Urlacher was named NFL Defensive Rookie of the Year.

The Bears surprised most with a breakout campaign in 2001. Apparently, this remained the most successful season for Jauron with the Bears. After they lost their first game of the season to the eventual Super Bowl XXXV champion, the Baltimore Ravens, 17–6 on the road, the Bears won their next six games. Two of those games were won in overtime, against the San Francisco 49ers (37–31) and the Cleveland Browns (27–21). In both games, safety Mike Brown capped remarkable comebacks (the Bears trailed 28–9 in the third quarter against San Francisco, and 21–7 with seconds remaining against Cleveland) by returning an interception in overtime for a touchdown. Unfortunately, the Green Bay Packers ended the win streak at home 20–12.

Fortunately, the Bears would win their next three games. However, the Bears traveled to Lambeau Field and were again swept by the Packers 17–7 in their last loss of the regular season. The Bears would win their last four games, ending the regular season with a 13–3 record. This qualified for second place in the NFC, earning the Bears a first-round bye in the playoffs.

In the divisional playoff game, the visiting Philadelphia Eagles won against the Bears 33–19. Despite the Bears' season ending on a sour note, rookie running back Anthony Thomas won the NFL Offensive Rookie of the Year award, and Dick Jauron was given the Coach of the Year award.

With Soldier Field being renovated, the Chicago Bears had to play their 2002 home games at the University of Illinois at Urbana–Champaign in Champaign, Illinois (136 miles outside Chicago). This was also the year the Houston Texans joined the NFL and realignments were made, with the Bears joining the Detroit Lions, the Green Bay Packers and the Minnesota Vikings in the newly formed NFC North division. The Bears also acquired former Pittsburgh Steelers quarterback Kordell "Slash" Stewart. Despite starting the 2002 season 2–0, the team was plagued by injuries and lost their next eight games. The Bears finally got their third win of the year at home against the Detroit Lions, but would lose four of the remaining five games of the season, finishing with a 4–12 record.

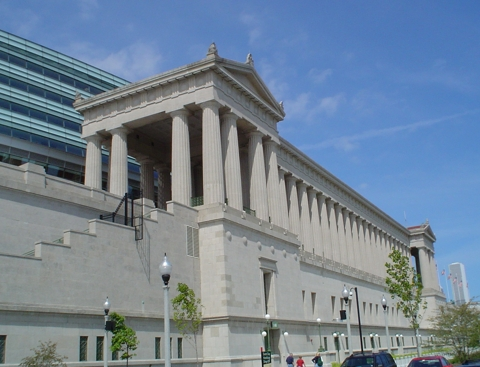
Soldier Field finished renovation for the 2003 Chicago Bears season.

For the 2003 season, the Bears were able to move back to the newly renovated Soldier Field, and the team also debuted their new mascot Staley Da Bear. Nevertheless, mediocrity continued as the Bears began the season with a 1–4 record by week five. Kordell Stewart lost his starting job after the Bears lost their next two road games. Chris Chandler was named their new quarterback, but ended up playing only four games for the Bears, winning the first two. This allowed Stewart to reclaim his starting job, and he played the next three games, winning two. The Bears finished the season with a 7–9 record.

Looking towards the future, the Bears allowed rookie quarterback Rex Grossman to start the last three games of the season. Grossman brought the Bears victories in their final two home games. In the end, the late showing of talent was not enough to save Dick Jauron's job, as he ended up being dismissed from the Bears. This post-Ditka decade saw an uneven effort to bring back the fiery Halas style and forge new ideas, as two coaches and various schemes came and went. Furthermore, this era was marred by a "quarterback carousel", where the starting job changed year after year. The hiring of general manager Jerry Angelo in 2001, after 14 years with the Tampa Bay Buccaneers, was viewed as a hopeful sign.

== 2004–2012: Lovie Smith era ==
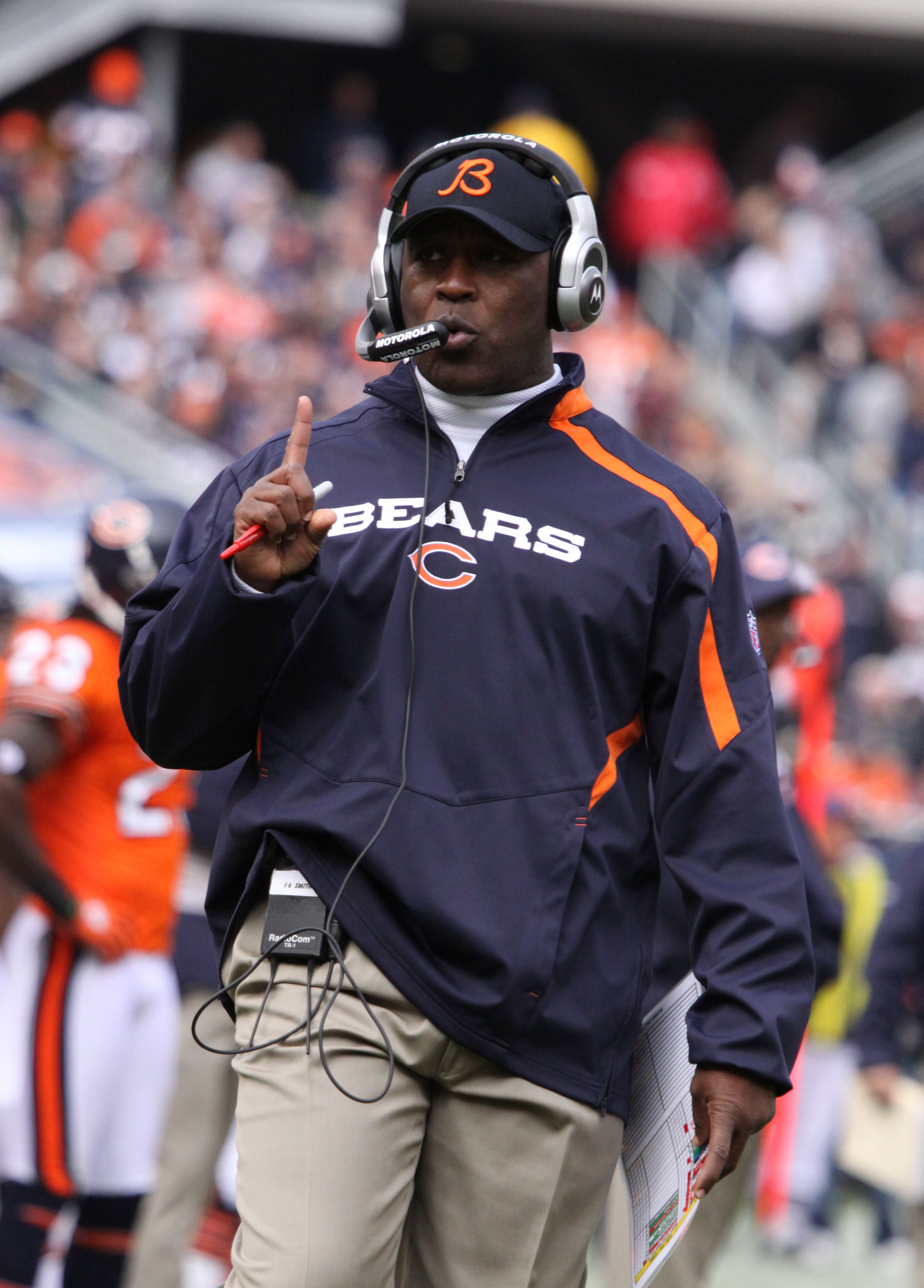
Lovie Smith coached the Bears from 2004 to 2012.

With Lovie Smith, former defensive coordinator for the St. Louis Rams, as their new head coach, the Bears made plans for the 2004 season. Since hiring Smith, all personnel moves made by general manager Jerry Angelo had an overwhelming degree of success. Under Lovie Smith, the Bears achieved a cumulative record of 63–49, including two playoff wins and two playoff losses, one of which was Super Bowl XLI in 2007.

At the beginning of his tenure, Smith laid out three goals: end Green Bay's dominance of the division, win the division, and win the Super Bowl. By the end of 2005, the first two goals had been realized.

=== 2004–2008: The new "Monsters of the Midway" and Super Bowl XLI ===
In Smith's first year as coach, the Bears ended the 2004 season at 5–11. For the first goal, Smith aimed to defeat the Bears' rival, the Green Bay Packers, at Lambeau Field. However, by week seven, the Bears recorded a poor starting record of 1–5, with the only win against Green Bay largely due to the week three road loss to the Minnesota Vikings, where they lost starting quarterback Rex Grossman from a season-ending knee injury. From then on, the Bears cycled through three different quarterbacks: Craig Krenzel, Jonathan Quinn and Chad Hutchinson. After a modest three-game win streak from week eight to 10, the Bears capped the streak in their 19–17 win over the Tennessee Titans in overtime with a safety in week 10. It was the second time in NFL history that a game ended in overtime on a safety. Afterwards, the Bears ended up losing six of the remaining seven games.

In 2005, after going 3–2 in the preseason (with Rex Grossman suffering a broken ankle in their preseason loss to the St. Louis Rams), the Bears named rookie quarterback Kyle Orton their starter, but their regular season started off poorly. The Bears began the 2005 season with a 1–3 record. Not even a bye week could help them, as the Bears lost a hard-fought road game to Trent Dilfer and the Cleveland Browns 20–10 in week five.

After the 1–3 start, the Bears had an eight-game winning streak, which started with two home games against Minnesota 28–3 and the Ravens 10–6. On a week 10 home game, the visiting 49ers attempted a 52-yard field goal as time expired in the first half, but the wind blew it to Nathan Vasher, who was in the end zone and returned that missed field goal 108 yards for the longest touchdown play in NFL history, a record that would only be repeated by the Bears' own Devin Hester almost exactly a year later. The eight-game winning streak came to an end on the road in a cold and snowy fight against the Pittsburgh Steelers (21–9).

The Bears closed out the season with a 2–2 record. In week 15, they won their last regular-season home game against the Atlanta Falcons with a final score of 16–3. During the game, Lovie Smith replaced Kyle Orton with a fully healed Rex Grossman. The following week, the Bears clinched the division with a dominant performance at Lambeau Field on Christmas Day (the first time the Bears ever played on Christmas). For the first time since 1991, the Bears swept the Packers, and also secured the NFC North Division title. The Bears ended the regular season with an 11–5 record, enough for second place in the NFC and a first-round bye in the playoffs. In addition, Lovie Smith received NFL Coach of the Year honors.

In the NFC divisional playoff game, the Carolina Panthers defeated the Bears 29–21, ending the latter team's season. Panthers receiver Steve Smith had 12 receptions for 218 yards and two touchdowns. The Panthers' offense dismantled the Bears' top-ranked defense. The Bears had a final chance to force overtime, but Rex Grossman's 4th-and-1 pass intended for Muhsin Muhammad fell incomplete with less than a minute left in the game.

The Bears started the 2006 season by winning their first seven games, marking their best start since 1988. The team established a strong offense under the helm of a healthy Rex Grossman, who was inactive for the most of his first three seasons due to injuries. Grossman earned a FedEx Offensive Player of the Month Award, a 100.9 passer rating during the first month of the season. During one game, Grossman threw four touchdowns and earned a passer rating of 148. The Bears' defense also made headlines, and allowed them to outscore their opponents 221–69 during the first two months of the season.

However, the Bears showed a glimpse of mortality during this period. After defeating the Buffalo Bills 40–7, the Bears traveled to Glendale, Arizona, to face the Arizona Cardinals, where Grossman committed six turnovers in a seemingly lost effort. With less than twenty minutes remaining, the Bears' defense and special teams mounted a comeback that allowed them to overcome a 20-point deficit and beat the Cardinals 24–23. After a decisive 41–10 crushing of the San Francisco 49ers, where the Bears scored 41 points in the first half, tying the record by the 1940 Championship Game victory, Grossman had another turnover-ridden performance against the Miami Dolphins (which reminisced the 1985 Bears season), where the Bears lost 31–13, the most points the team allowed that season. However, the Bears bounced back with a staunch performance against the New York Giants, where Devin Hester tied Nathan Vasher's longest missed-field goal return record, and a shutout victory over the New York Jets.

The Bears then traveled to Foxboro, Massachusetts, where Grossman and the defense struggled to defeat the New England Patriots. Despite earning another chance to win the game, Grossman threw a game-ending interception to Asante Samuel. The following week, the Bears' defense and special teams came up big in the wake of a struggling passing game against the Minnesota Vikings 23–13. The win clinched their second consecutive NFC North title, and a playoff-berth. The team began to re-establish their clockwork performance during the next three games, including one where Hester returned two kicks for touchdowns against the St. Louis Rams, and an overtime thriller against the Tampa Bay Buccaneers, where Grossman threw for over 300 yards. The season ended on a low note, when the Packers defeated the Bears 26–7, in the regular season's finale, with Grossman leaving a passer rating of zero.

Local media began to criticize Grossman for his inconsistent performances and shortcomings. Many fans called upon Lovie Smith to bench Grossman in favor of veteran quarterback Brian Griese. Nevertheless, Smith, who had supported Grossman throughout the season, opted to keep Grossman as the team's starter. The Bears prepared to take on the Seattle Seahawks for a second time, who had returned with a healthy Shaun Alexander. Prior to the game, Smith announced the creation of the "Fourth Phase", which involved using fan support as an advantage. On a dreary day along the lakefront, the Bears defeated the Seattle Seahawks 27–24 on an overtime Robbie Gould field goal. The win marked the first time since 1994 that the Bears had won a playoff game.

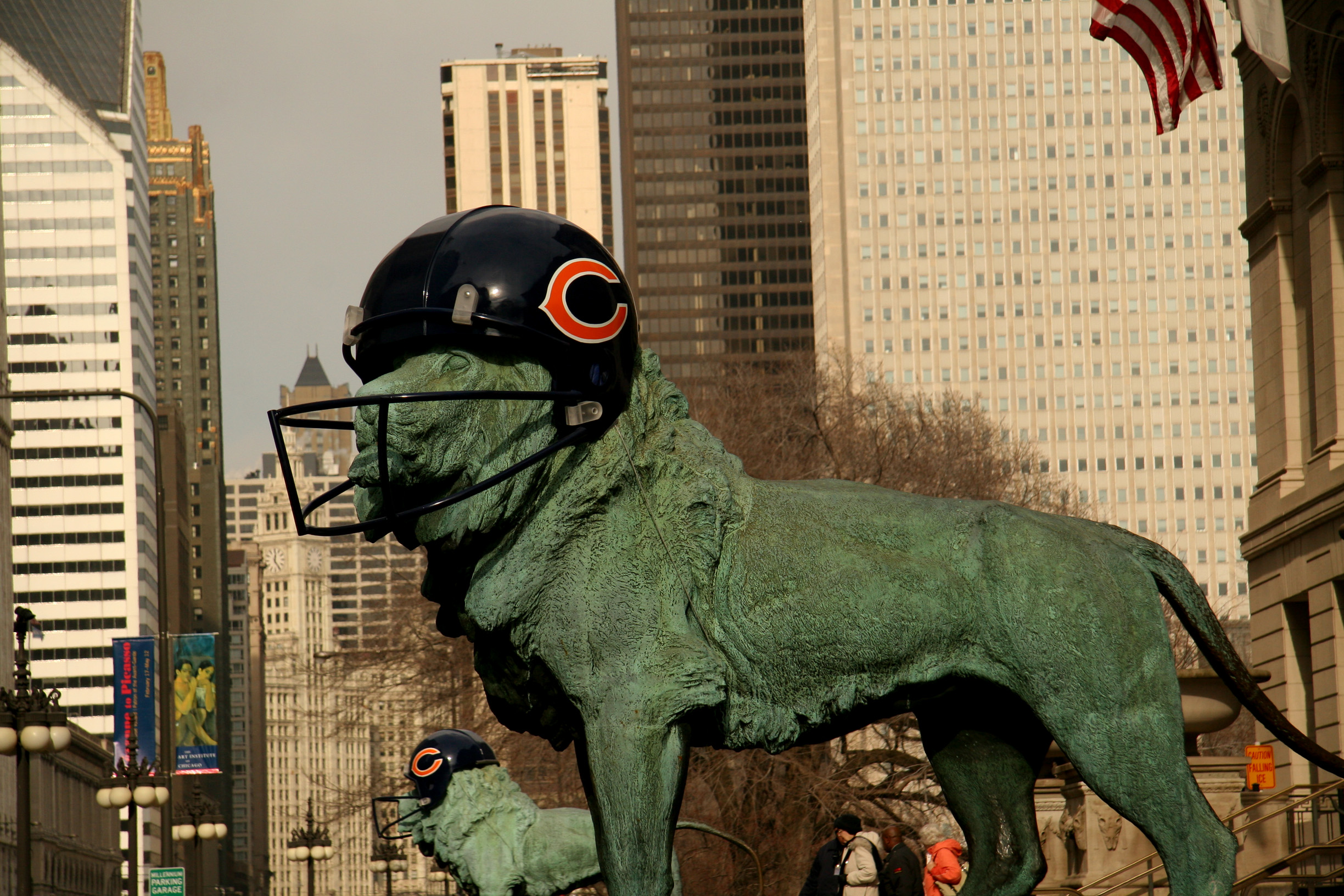
The two lion sculptures outside of the Art Institute of Chicago Building decorated in support of the Bears ahead of Super Bowl XLI. Many Chicago landmarks were decorated to support the Bears for Super Bowl XLI.

The following week, the Bears faced the New Orleans Saints in the NFC Championship, marking the Saints' first Conference Championship appearance. The Bears' defense shut down the Saints' top-ranked offense, while running backs Thomas Jones and Cedric Benson exploited the Saints' run defense for nearly 180 yards and three touchdowns. The Bears defeated the Saints 39–14, earning them the George Halas Trophy and the right to represent the National Football Conference at Super Bowl XLI against the Indianapolis Colts in their first Super Bowl appearance since Super Bowl XX in 1986. Also, Lovie Smith became the first African-American coach to lead his team to a Super Bowl. This feat was matched hours later by his mentor and friend Tony Dungy of the Colts.

The Bears entered Super Bowl XLI as seven-point underdogs. Amidst the game's rainy weather, the Bears took the quickest lead in Super Bowl history when Devin Hester returned the game's opening kick-off for a touchdown return. Although the Bears' expanded their lead with a touchdown, the Colts struck back to take a halftime lead. The Bears' hopes for a comeback were almost thwarted when Grossman threw an interception that was returned for a touchdown. Ultimately, the Colts defeated the Bears 29–17. After a productive season, the Bears returned to Chicago in hopes of replicating their success the next year.

Success was not forthcoming in the 2007 season, which saw the Bears struggle and finish 7–9. Legal troubles affected defensive tackle Tank Johnson during the spring, and he was cut by the Bears on June 25. Defensive coordinator Ron Rivera was dropped as well after his contract with the team expired. After the Bears started the season with a 1–3 record, Lovie Smith benched Grossman in favor of Griese. However, injuries ravaged the team's roster, resulting in multiple inconsistent performances on defense and offense. The team finished the season with a 7–9 record, one game behind the Detroit Lions. On the bright side, the Bears swept the Green Bay Packers for the first time since 2005, including a 35–7 victory against the 13–2 Packers in week 17.

In 2008, Lovie Smith named Kyle Orton the team's starting quarterback. The Bears parted with Cedric Benson, who was cut after two alcohol-related arrests and was succeeded by rookie running back Matt Forte, who rushed for 1,238 yards and caught 47 receptions for 438 yards. The team recorded a major victory in week 1 in a Super Bowl XLI rematch against the Colts at Lucas Oil Stadium 29–13. The Bears posted a winning record again (9–7), but ended up being one game behind the eventual NFC North champion, the Minnesota Vikings, and failed to qualify for the playoffs after losing 31–24 to the Houston Texans in Week 17.

=== Jay Cutler trade ===
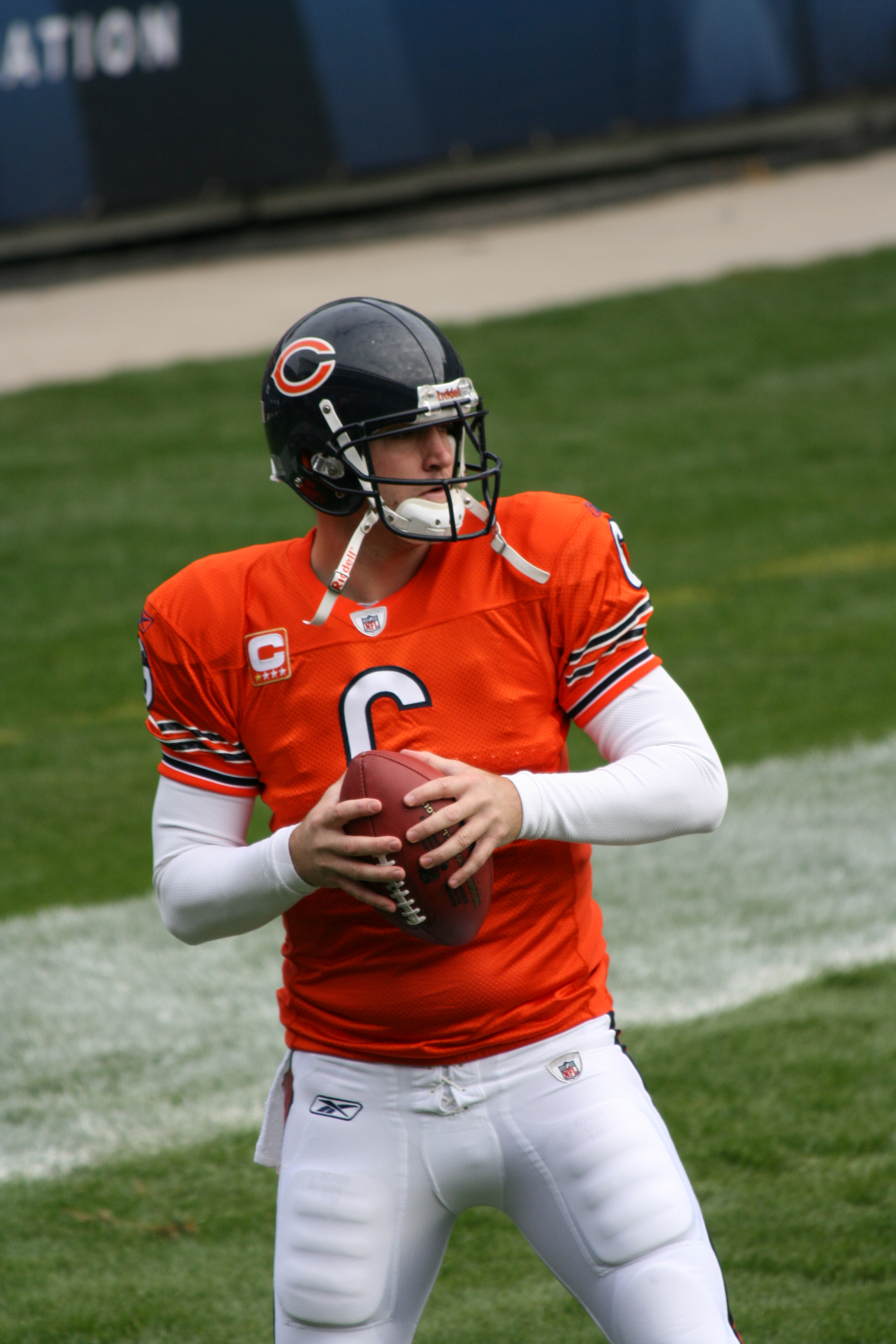
The Bears traded Kyle Orton and a first round pick to the Denver Broncos for Jay Cutler.

During the 2009 off-season, Rex Grossman achieved free-agent status and left the team, signing with the Houston Texans. The Bears then traded Kyle Orton to the Broncos in exchange for quarterback Jay Cutler. The 2009 season began on an foreboding note, as Cutler threw four interceptions against the Green Bay Packers in week one. However, the Bears bounced back to 3–1, including a victory in week two over the defending Super Bowl XLIII champion, the Pittsburgh Steelers, but things fell apart quickly after the bye week, with the Bears losing eight of the next ten games, including a loss to the San Francisco 49ers, where Cutler threw a career-high five interceptions, including a game-ending pick in the red-zone with less than a minute left in the game. A 31–7 loss to the Baltimore Ravens in Week 15 mathematically eliminated the Bears from the playoffs, but the team managed to close out the year by winning the last two matches against the Minnesota Vikings (a 36–30 overtime win) and the Detroit Lions (37–23) to finish 7–9.

The following offseason, the Bears signed Pro Bowler Julius Peppers, Chester Taylor and Brandon Manumaleuna. The Bears began the 2010 season by hosting the Lions and winning 19–14 after a controversial call. Next, they traveled to Dallas and beat the Cowboys 27–20. The next week, the Packers came to town and lost 20–17 after a mass of penalties (18 total), putting the Bears up to 3–0. However, their winning streak ended when they suffered a 17–3 loss to the Giants on the road. Jay Cutler was sacked multiple times and suffered a concussion. Veteran free agent quarterback Todd Collins replaced Cutler, but was also quickly injured. Third-string quarterback Caleb Hanie played the remainder of the game.

After this loss, the Bears had an easy road win over the 0–5 Carolina Panthers before another 23–20 loss to the Seattle Seahawks. Continued difficulties with the offense and offensive line led to a second straight home loss when the Redskins won 17–14 in week seven. After the bye week, offensive coordinator Mike Martz worked to revamp the offense to compensate for Cutler's lack of offensive line protection. After this, they easily beat the struggling Vikings at home 27–13, followed by a 16–0 shutout of the Dolphins in Miami, handing the Bears their 700th win, a league first.

In week 12, the Bears hosted the Philadelphia Eagles for the second season in a row and won 31–27, while also preserving their perfect record against Eagles quarterback Michael Vick (who, after the game, had a 0–5 all-time record playing them). After beating the Lions in Detroit on more questionable officiating, the Bears suffered a total collapse at home against the New England Patriots in a blowing snowstorm (the Patriots won 36–7).

The next week saw the Bears drawn into the turmoil of the Vikings' 2010 season. As the Hubert H. Humphrey Metrodome's inflatable roof had collapsed the week before, the two teams had to play at TCF Bank Stadium at the University of Minnesota campus in frigid winter weather. Despite being a nominal home game for the Vikings, they were not a team prepared for outdoor play, and the Bears overwhelmed them 40–14. It was here that Brett Favre took his final snap in the NFL after he was knocked into the frozen ground and suffered a concussion, ending a 20-year career that included 297 consecutive starts.

Afterwards, the Bears returned home and beat the Jets 38–34 in a shootout before traveling to the "Frozen Tundra" of Lambeau Field for week 17. Their arch-rival Packers only needed to lose this game to be removed from playoff contention, so Lovie Smith decided to play Chicago's starters. He also apparently ran generic plays to avoid giving anything away to the Packers for the playoffs, but the offense again sputtered and Green Bay won a 10–3 defensive struggle to secure a wild card playoff berth.

Throughout the season, the Bears' offense and offensive line were rated in the NFL's bottom ten, and the Bears mainly depended on special teams (especially Devin Hester's duties as a punt returner) and an aging but still effective defense led by defensive end Julius Peppers (acquired from Carolina during the off-season) and linebacker Brian Urlacher. Although their own playoff chances were unharmed by the loss in Green Bay (they had already gotten the number-two NFC seed and a first-round bye with their 11–5 regular season record), that game ultimately proved fatal because of their inability to remove the Packers from postseason contention.

After the Seahawks gained a surprise division title with a 7–9 season record and an even more miraculous playoff victory over the defending Super Bowl XLIV champion, the New Orleans Saints, they headed to Chicago in the divisional round. However, there was no repeat of week six this time. On a gray, fog-shrouded winter afternoon, Jay Cutler threw two touchdown passes as the Bears overpowered the Seahawks 35–24 to advance to the NFC Championship.

The Packers, meanwhile, had beaten the Eagles and Falcons in the playoffs to head to Soldier Field for what was only the second-ever postseason meeting with the Bears (the first was in 1941). To everyone's surprise, the Packers marched out to an early lead as the Bears' offense struggled. During the third quarter, Cutler was pulled with a knee injury and replaced by Todd Collins, who was benched after only two minutes of play. Caleb Hanie came in and tried to rally the team, but hammered by the Packers defense, threw a fatal interception that was caught by nose tackle B. J. Raji and returned for a touchdown. Although Hanie subsequently belted a 35-yard touchdown pass, Green Bay's defense held on to win the game 21–14 and advance to Super Bowl XLV.

Cutler was widely blamed for a disastrous end to the Bears' miracle season and after the NFC championship by fans as well as players such as Maurice Jones-Drew, and some fans burned Cutler jerseys. Some argued that he did not show any indication that his knee injury was serious enough to keep him out of the game, and that he had been riding an exercise bike during the rest of the game. However, Cutler was still defended by the Bears and various players, including the Packers' Aaron Rodgers and LeRoy Butler, with Rodgers calling the criticism "disrespectful" and Butler calling the critics "stupid".

In the 2011 season, the Bears went 7–3 under Cutler, but after he came down with a thumb injury, Caleb Hanie started the games, and the team lost five straight games under Hanie, as well as running back Matt Forté to an ACL sprain. However, Forté was having a productive season, leading the league in total yards from scrimmage until the injury came, and the Bears went 8–8 with Josh McCown at quarterback.

== 2012–2014: Phil Emery and Marc Trestman era ==
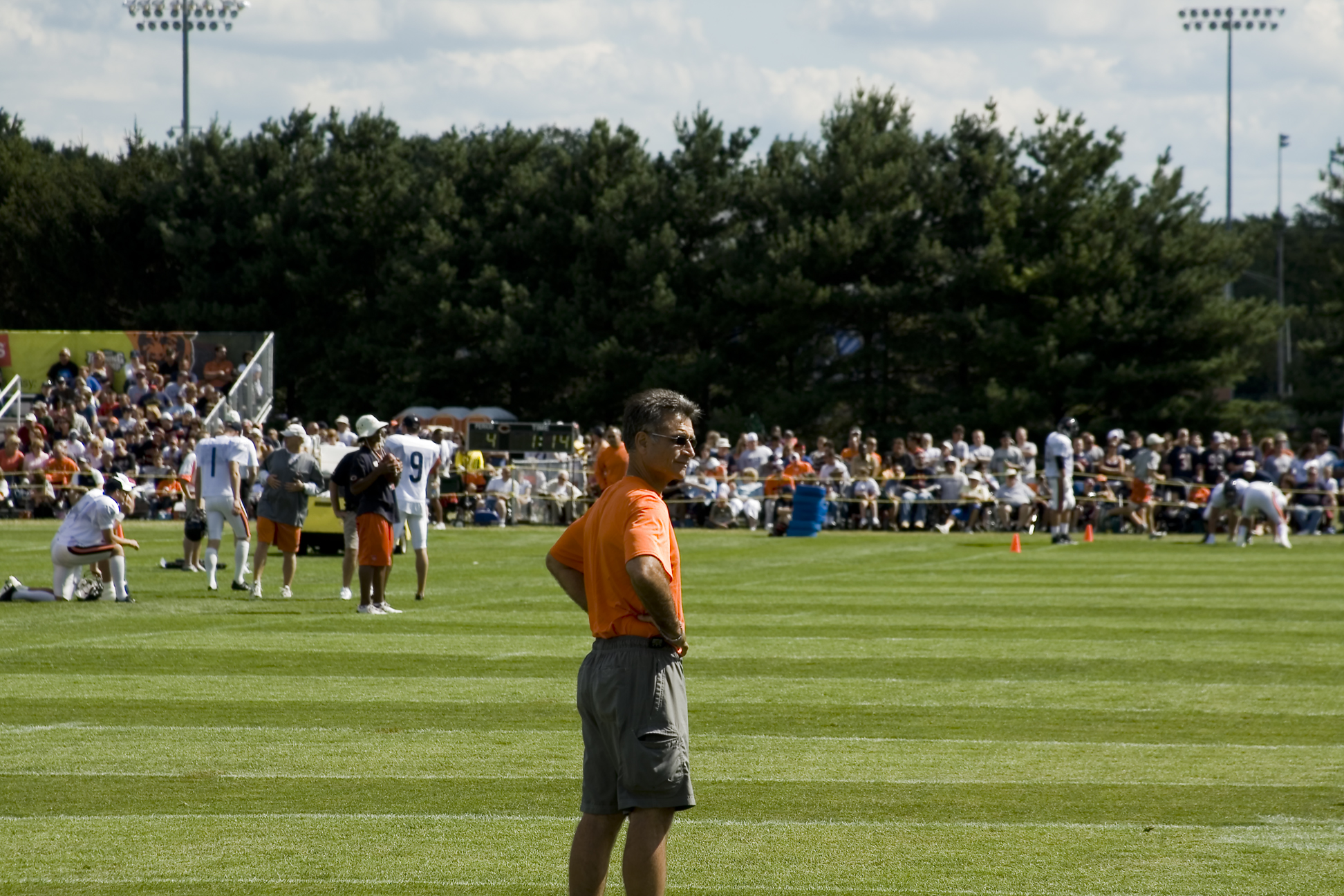
General manager Jerry Angelo was fired after 11 seasons, and was replaced by Phil Emery.

In 2012, general manager Jerry Angelo was fired after 11 seasons with the Bears. During their search for a replacement, the team considered Marc Ross, the New York Giants' director of college scouting; Jimmy Raye III, the San Diego Chargers' director of player personnel; Jason Licht, the New England Patriots' director of pro personnel; and Phil Emery, the Kansas City Chiefs' director of college scouting, former Bears scout and eventual general manager, along with in-house candidate Tim Ruskell. Offensive coordinator Mike Martz also retired, and was replaced by offensive line coach Mike Tice. Emery's first move as general manager was giving Matt Forte the franchise tag, as well as acquiring Pro Bowl MVP Brandon Marshall from the Miami Dolphins, reuniting him with Cutler.

Through the first seven games of the 2012 season, the Bears became the first team in league history to return six interceptions for touchdowns, with another interception by Brian Urlacher in week nine bringing them closer to the record set by the 1961 San Diego Chargers. However, after the Bears missed the playoffs after starting the year 7–1 (making them the first team to start the season with that record and not make the playoffs since the 1996 Washington Redskins), Smith was fired and eventually succeeded by Montreal Alouettes head coach Marc Trestman. On March 20, 2013, the Brian Urlacher era also came to an end when he and the Bears failed to agree on a new contract.

The Trestman era began with a 24–21 victory over the Cincinnati Bengals, as Trestman became the fourth head coach in franchise history to win in his head coaching debut, after George Halas (1920), Neill Armstrong (1978) and Dick Jauron (1999). In his first season, Trestman helped lead the Bears to one of the best offenses in the team's history, concluding the year with the second best scoring offense in the NFL with 445 points, and breaking team records in total yards (6,109), passing yards (4,450), passing touchdowns (32), and first downs (344). Conversely, 2013 was also one of the worst defensive years in Bears' history, with franchise-lows in yards allowed (6,313), rushing yards allowed (2,583) and points (478), while also ranking dead last in run defense by allowing a league-worst 5.35 rushing yards per carry. This would lead to the Bears finishing 8–8 in their first season under Trestman, being eliminated from the playoffs by the Green Bay Packers in the final game of the season.

In 2014, the Bears struggled and finished the season 5–11. Trestman and Emery were fired at the end of the season.

== 2015–2021: The Ryan Pace era ==
On January 8, 2015, the Bears hired Ryan Pace, the New Orleans Saints' director of player personnel, as general manager. On January 16, they hired John Fox as their new head coach. In Fox's first season, the Bears improved to a 6–10 record, which included a Thanksgiving win over the Packers at Lambeau Field.

In 2016, however, the Bears were plagued by injuries to multiple positions, including quarterback, as they fell to a 3–13 record, the worst in their history since the NFL's expansion to a 16-game schedule. After Jay Cutler went down with injuries, Brian Hoyer started for the team until he suffered a broken arm, which led to third-string quarterback Matt Barkley playing. None of the three quarterbacks returned for the 2017 season.

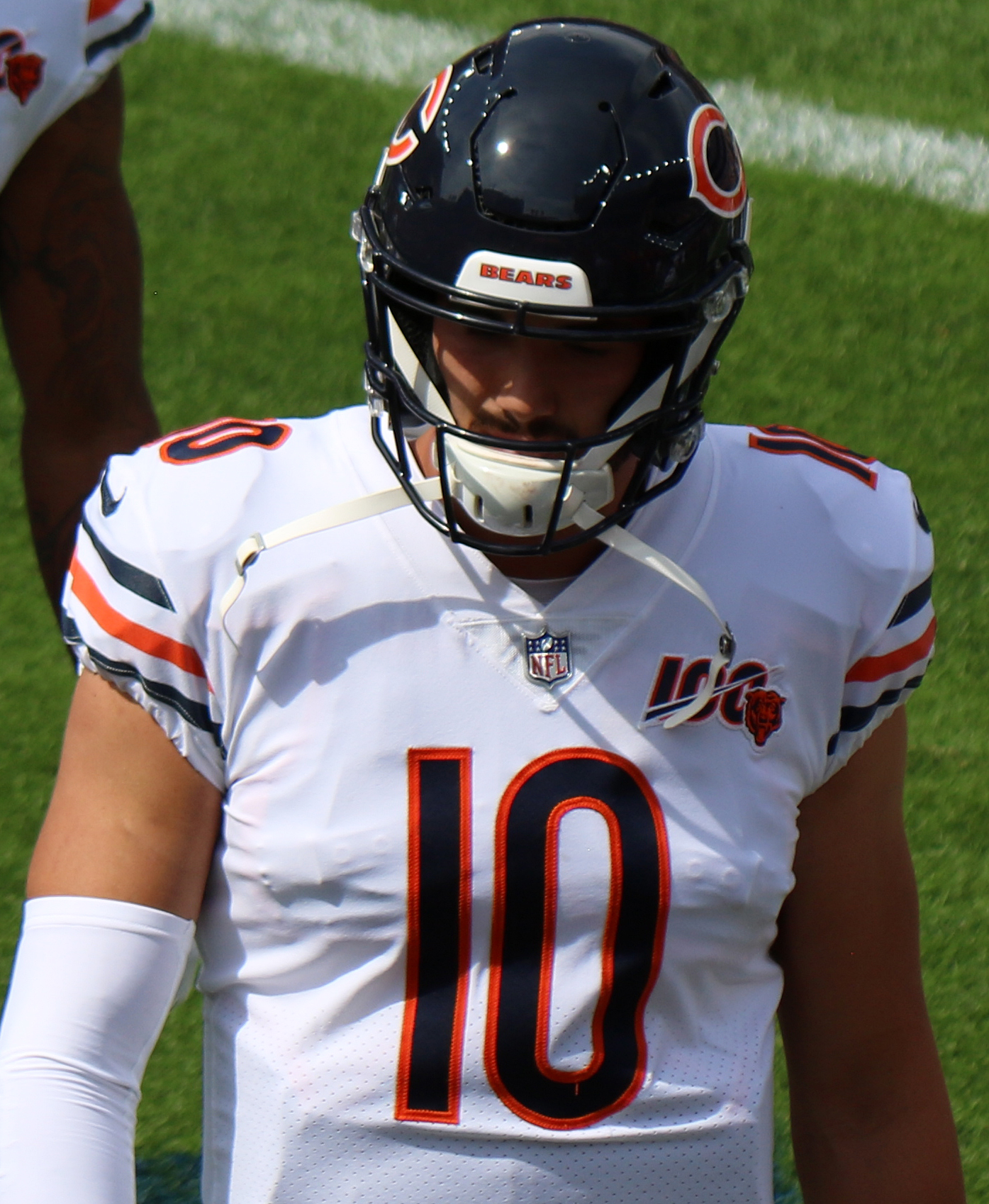
The Bears selected quarterback Mitchell Trubisky with the second overall pick in the 2017 NFL draft.

In the 2017 NFL draft, the team selected quarterback Mitchell Trubisky, who sat behind newly-signed quarterback Mike Glennon for the first four games before taking over. The Bears ended the season 5–11 and again finished last in the NFC North. On January 1, 2018, Fox was fired, ending his tenure in Chicago with a 14–34 record. A week later, Kansas City Chiefs offensive coordinator Matt Nagy was hired to become the 16th head coach in Bears history.

On September 2, 2018, the Bears traded away their 2019 and 2020 first round draft picks to the Oakland Raiders in exchange for disgruntled defensive end/linebacker Khalil Mack. In the 2018 season, the Bears returned to the postseason for the first time since 2010, winning the NFC North division. However, their season ended during the wild card round with a loss to the Philadelphia Eagles after kicker Cody Parkey had a game-winning field goal blocked, resulting in the kick bouncing off the goal post twice. He was cut from the team shortly afterwards, and Eddy Piñeiro was picked as his replacement for the 2019 season after a substantial kicking competition in the offseason. Defensive coordinator Vic Fangio was named the head coach of the Denver Broncos shortly after the season ended, with former Indianapolis Colts head coach Chuck Pagano taking over.

The 2019 season began with high expectations for the Bears, with some outlets picking them to make a Super Bowl run. However, those lofty expectations would not be met as the Bears slumped to an 8–8 record. While their defense ranked in the upper tier of the league, their offense struggled all season, ranking in the bottom tier of the league. The Bears jumped out to a 3–1 record, but proceeded to lose seven of their last twelve games, most of them by a touchdown or less, missing the playoffs for the eighth time in nine years.

Before the 2020 NFL season, the Bears traded a fourth round draft pick to the Jacksonville Jaguars to acquire veteran quarterback Nick Foles. However, the COVID-19 pandemic limited the amount of practice the Bears could conduct leading into the actual season. Nagy named Trubisky the starting quarterback to begin the season. The Bears opened the 2020 season with two narrow wins, but Trubisky was benched after throwing an interception with the Bears facing a 16-point deficit against the Atlanta Falcons during week three. Foles rallied the three fourth-quarter touchdowns en route to a 30–26 victory. The Bears cruised to a 5–1 record with Foles at quarterback. However, the team suffered six straight losses and plunged to 5–7.

Nagy handed over offensive play-calling duties to Bill Lazor. Trubisky reclaimed his starting role after Foles suffered an injury. The Bears won their next three consecutive games thanks in part to a reinvigorated offense. The team played the Green Bay Packers in their regular season finale with the opportunity to qualify for the playoffs. The Packers defeated the Bears, who fell to an 8–8 record. Despite the loss, the Bears secured the final wildcard spot in the 2021 NFL playoffs after the Arizona Cardinals lost to the Los Angeles Rams. The Bears lost 21–9 to the New Orleans Saints in the wild card round of the playoffs.

Nagy and Pace remained with the Bears heading into the 2021 NFL season. The team did not re-sign Trubisky and instead signed veteran quarterback Andy Dalton during free agency. The team continued to invest in the quarterback position by trading their current and 2022 first-round draft pick to move up and select Justin Fields. Nagy resumed offensive play calling duties and named Dalton as the team's start quarterback. On defense, Chuck Pagano retired and Sean Desai was named as the team’s defensive coordinator. After dropping their 2021 season opener, Dalton was injured during the second game of the season and Fields became the team's starting quarterback. Fields' first start for Chicago resulted in him being sacked nine times with only one net passing yard in 6–26 loss to the Cleveland Browns. Nagy again relinquished offensive play calling duties to Lazor. The Bears suffered a five-game losing streak during the season and fell out of playoff contention. The team finished the season with a 6–11 record and ranked 27th in offensive scoring. Nagy and general manager Ryan Pace were both fired following the end of the regular season.

== 2022–present: The Ryan Poles era ==
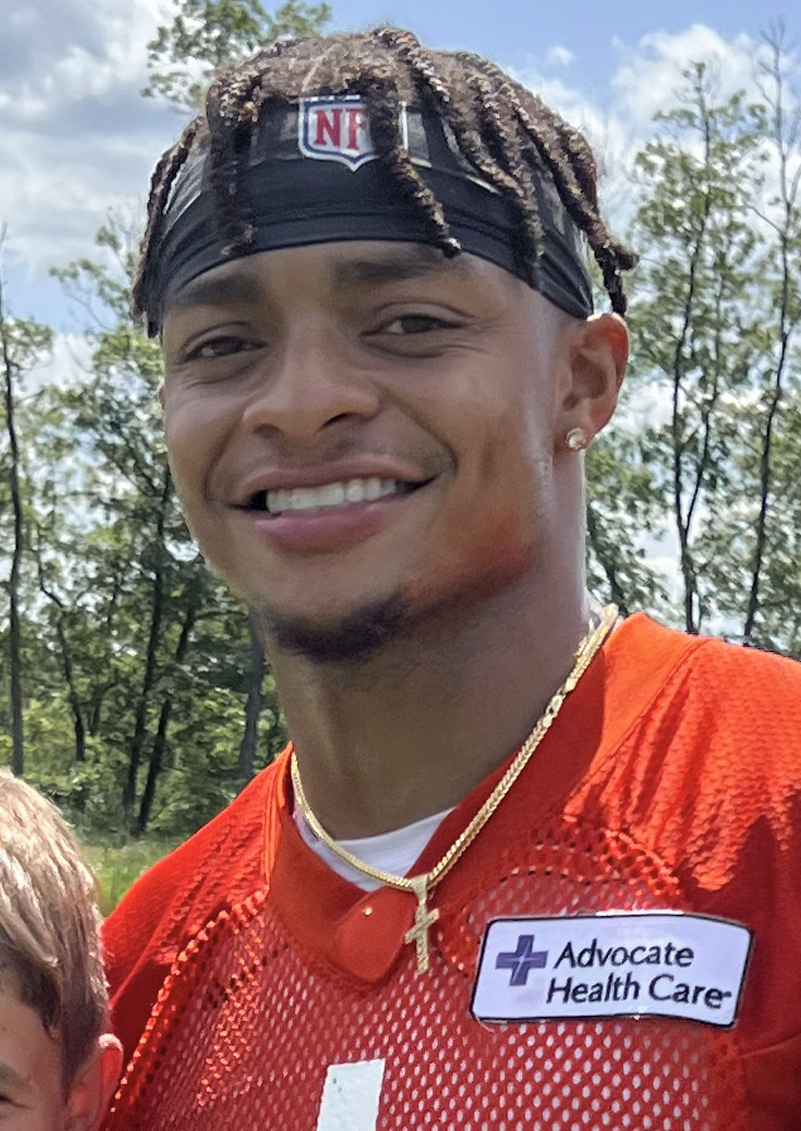
The Bears traded up in the 2021 NFL draft to select Justin Fields with the 11th overall pick.

The Bears hired Ryan Poles from the Kansas City Chiefs to become the franchise's seventh general manager. The team then hired Matt Eberflus from the Indianapolis Colts as their head coach. Luke Getsy was hired from the rival Green Bay Packers to become the team's offensive coordinator and help develop Justin Fields. Eberflus transitioned the Bears to a 4–3 defense from a 3–4 defense. The team then traded Pro Bowl linebacker Khalil Mack to the Los Angeles Chargers in exchange for a second-round pick in the 2022 NFL draft (which they used to take Jaquan Brisker) and a sixth-round pick in the 2023 NFL draft. The move came as Poles attempted to generate draft capital while also offloading most of Mack's remaining contract. Poles released veterans Tarik Cohen, Danny Trevathan, and Eddie Goldman, while also allowing Allen Robinson, Akiem Hicks, and James Daniels to walk away from the Bears in free agency.

The team started the season with a 2–1 record, but fell to 3–5 as the trade deadline approached. The Bears dealt defensive stars Roquan Smith and Robert Quinn in exchange for future draft picks. The team then acquired wide receiver Chase Claypool to help their struggling passing game. The Bears entered a franchise record 10-game losing streak. Despite the team's slump, Fields set multiple NFL and franchise quarterback rushing records. The Bears finished the season with an NFL-worst 3–14 record, which secured the team the rights to the first overall pick in the 2023 NFL draft. The Bears are entered free agency with an NFL-high $118 million available in salary cap.

On January 12, the Bears hired former Big Ten Conference commissioner Kevin Warren as their new President/CEO replacing Ted Phillips, who retired after the 2022 season after 40 years with the organization. During the 2023 offseason, the Bears made trades and signed big name free agents. They traded their first overall pick to the Carolina Panthers in exchange for the ninth overall pick in the 2023 NFL draft, a 2024 first-round pick, a 2025 second-round pick, and wide receiver D. J. Moore. They signed linebackers T. J. Edwards (three-year $19.5M) and Tremaine Edmunds (four-year, $72M), offensive lineman Nate Davis (three-year, $30M), defensive linemen DeMarcus Walker (three-year, $21M) and Andrew Billings (one-year, $3.5M), running backs Travis Homer (two-year, $4.5M) and D'Onta Foreman (one-year, $3M), and tight end Robert Tonyan (one-year, $2.65M). Before the preseason started, they signed veteran Defensive end Yannick Ngakoue to a one year, $10.5M contract.

The Bears lost their first four games of the 2023 season, extending their losing streak to a franchise-record 14 games dating back to the previous season. The team's defensive coordinator, Alan Williams, also abruptly resigned from the team for personal reasons. The Bears bounced back by winning their Week 5 game against the Washington Commanders, but dropped their next game against the Minnesota Vikings, while also losing quarterback Justin Fields to a thumb injury. The team turned to Tyson Bagent, an undrafted NCAA Division II rookie, as their quarterback while Fields recovered. Bagent led the Bears to a 2–2 record. The team's defense improved with the addition of defensive end Montez Sweat, whom the team acquired from the Commanders for a second-round pick in the 2024 NFL draft. Fields returned as the Bears made a push for the playoffs that ultimately fell short after a Week 15 loss to the Cleveland Browns. The loss to Cleveland marked the third time in 2023 that the team managed to lose after leading by at least 10 points in the fourth quarter. The Bears won their next two games before losing their season finale to the Green Bay Packers, finishing the season with a 7–10 record and finishing last in the division for the second year in a row.

The Bears fired most of their offensive coaching staff after the game, including offensive coordinator Luke Getsy. The Bears found themselves with the first overall pick in the NFL Draft for the second consecutive year, as the Carolina Panthers, who traded their 2024 first round-draft pick to the Bears earlier in 2023, finished the season with the NFL's worst record. The Bears hired Seattle Seahawks offensive coordinator Shane Waldron as their new offensive coordinator and hired their former defensive assistant and defensive line coach Eric Washington as their new defensive coordinator. Over the offseason, the Bears signed free safety Kevin Byard, running back D'Andre Swift, tight end Gerald Everett, and strong safety Jonathan Owens. The Bears also acquired Ryan Bates for a 2024 fifth and six-time Pro Bowler Keenan Allen for a 2024 fourth-round pick.

The Bears traded quarterback Justin Fields to the Pittsburgh Steelers for a conditional 2025 sixth-round pick and used their first overall selection in the 2024 NFL Draft to select USC quarterback Caleb Williams. The Bears used their ninth overall pick from the same draft to select Rome Odunze from Washington, who joined fellow wide receivers D. J. Moore and Keenan Allen. The Bears were featured on the training camp edition of Hard Knocks for the first time. Before the regular season started, the Bears traded for Seattle Seahawks defensive end Darrell Taylor for a 2025 sixth-round pick and Cleveland Browns defensive tackle Chris Williams also for a 2025 sixth.

The Bears opened the 2024 season with a 4–2 start, which was highlighted by strong defensive play and a developing offensive that scored at least 35 points in back-to-back weeks. The team lost to the Washington Commanders after surrendering a last-second touchdown on a Hail Mary pass play known as the Hail Maryland. The Bears failed to score an offensive touchdown in 23 consecutive possessions over their next two losses. Following a 19–3 loss to the New England Patriots, the Bears fired offensive coordinator Shane Waldron after only nine games, allowing former Carolina Panthers offensive coordinator and then Bears offensive assistant Thomas Brown to become the new offensive coordinator.

Following a six-game losing streak, capped off with a heavily criticized final drive on a 20–23 loss on Thanksgiving to the Detroit Lions, the Bears fired Eberflus. This was the first time in Bears history that the organization fired a head coach midway through the season. The team named offensive coordinator Thomas Brown as their interim head coach. Brown led the Bears to a 1–4 record as the Bears finished the season with a 5–12 record.

On January 21, 2025, the Bears hired Ben Johnson from the Detroit Lions as the franchise's 18th head coach. The Bears also cleaned out most of their coaching staff and made many key hires including the hires of former New Orleans Saints head coach Dennis Allen as defensive coordinator, former Denver Broncos tight ends coach Declan Doyle as offensive coordinator, former wide receiver Antwaan Randle El as assistant head coach and wide receivers coach, former cornerback Al Harris as defensive backs coach and defensive pass game coordinator, former Ohio State quarterback J. T. Barrett as quarterbacks coach, former Kansas City Chiefs offensive coordinator Eric Bieniemy as running backs coach, and former New Orleans Saints assistant Dan Roushar as offensive line coach.

The Bears shored up their offensive line after Caleb Williams was sacked 68 times in 2024. The team traded for guards Jonah Jackson from the Los Angeles Rams and Joe Thuney from the Chiefs, while also signing free agent center Drew Dalman. The Bears signed tight end Durham Smythe, defensive tackle Grady Jarrett, wide receiver Olamide Zaccheaus, and defensive end Dayo Odeyingbo in free agency. Virginia Halas McCaskey, who became owner of the team in 1983, died at the age of 102 on February 6. The Bears began the season with a 0–2 record before improving their performance. In contrast to the previous season's close losses, the 2025 team recorded six fourth quarter come-from-behind victories during the regular season. The offense featured the league's third-ranked rushing attack, while the defense recorded the highest number of turnovers in the NFL. In his sophomore season, Caleb Williams passed for a franchise-record 3,942 yards. The team finished with an 11–6 record, securing the second seed in the playoffs. In the wild card round of the 2025–26 NFL playoffs, the Bears overcame a 21–6 deficit to defeat Green Bay. The team subsequently lost in the Divisional round to Los Angeles Rams.

== Footnotes ==
1. "Pottsville Maroons: NFL owners refuse to reconsider 1925 ruling". Pottsville Republican. Archived from the original on October 23, 2009.
2. "The First Ever Playoff Game". Pro Football Hall of Fame.
3. "Manning Jr. charged with assault". ESPN.
