= Bob Schnelker =

American football player and coach (1928–2016)

No. 85, 88
- Position: Tight end

Personal information
- Born: October 17, 1928; Galion, Ohio, U.S.
- Died: December 12, 2016 (aged 88); Naples, Florida, U.S.
- Listed height: 6 ft 3 in (1.91 m)
- Listed weight: 214 lb (97 kg)

Career information
- High school: Upper Sandusky (Upper Sandusky, Ohio)
- College: Bowling Green
- NFL draft: 1950: 29th round, 377th overall pick

Career history

Playing
- Philadelphia Eagles (1953); New York Giants (1954–1960); Minnesota Vikings (1961); Pittsburgh Steelers (1961)

Coaching
- Los Angeles Rams (1963–1965) Receivers coach; Green Bay Packers (1966–1971) Receivers coach; San Diego Chargers (1972–1973) Offensive coordinator; Miami Dolphins (1974) Receivers coach; Kansas City Chiefs (1975–1976) Receivers coach; Kansas City Chiefs (1977) Offensive coordinator; Detroit Lions (1978–1981) Offensive coordinator; Green Bay Packers (1982–1985) Offensive coordinator; Minnesota Vikings (1986–1990) Offensive coordinator

Awards and highlights
- NFL champion (1956); 2× Pro Bowl (1958, 1959)

Career NFL statistics
- Receptions: 211
- Receiving yards: 3,667
- Receiving touchdowns: 33
- Stats at Pro Football Reference
- Coaching profile at Pro Football Reference

Robert Bernard Schnelker (October 17, 1928 – December 12, 2016) was an American professional football player and coach in the National Football League (NFL). He played as a tight end for nine seasons, primarily with the New York Giants. He later served as a coach for several NFL teams for over 20 seasons.

== Playing career ==
Schnelker played college football at Bowling Green State University. He was named as an All-Ohio end twice while also playing on the track and field team. He was inducted into the program's athletic Hall of Fame as part of their first class in 1964.

He was selected in the 29th round of the 1950 NFL draft by the Cleveland Browns. He served in the Marines before being discharged a few years later, where the Philadelphia Eagles picked him up for their roster before he was traded to the New York Giants. Schnelker was a two-time Pro Bowler and a member of the 1956 NFL Champion Giants. As a member of the expansion team Minnesota Vikings in 1961, he caught the first touchdown pass in the first game played by the team from Fran Tarkenton.

== NFL career statistics ==
Legend
	Won the NFL championship
	Led the league
**Bold**	Career high

=== Regular season ===
Year	Team	Games		Receiving				
Year	Team	GP	GS	Rec	Yds	Avg	Lng	TD
1953	PHI	8	3	4	34	8.5	12	0
1954	NYG	12	12	30	550	18.3	68	**8**
1955	NYG	12	12	25	326	13.0	31	2
1956	NYG	12	5	9	122	13.6	19	1
1957	NYG	12	9	20	450	**22.5**	**70**	5
1958	NYG	12	12	24	460	19.2	63	5
1959	NYG	11	11	37	**714**	19.3	66	6
1960	NYG	12	11	**38**	610	16.1	**70**	2
1961	MIN	6	6	6	70	11.7	20	1
1961	PIT	8	6	18	331	18.4	59	3
		105	87	211	3,667	17.4	70	33

=== Playoffs ===
Year	Team	Games		Receiving				
Year	Team	GP	GS	Rec	Yds	Avg	Lng	TD
1956	NYG	1	0	0	0	0.0	0	0
1958	NYG	2	2	4	109	**27.3**	46	0
1959	NYG	1	1	**9**	**175**	19.4	**48**	**1**
		4	3	13	284	21.8	48	1

== Coaching career ==
After retiring from football, Schnelker was an assistant coach with the Los Angeles Rams, Miami Dolphins, Detroit Lions, Kansas City Chiefs, Green Bay Packers and the Minnesota Vikings. It was with the Vikings that led to a memorable moment from head coach Jerry Burns, who leapt to Schnelker's defense in a profanity-laced tirade after a 23–21 win (a game that saw Rich Karlis make seven field goals before a game-winning safety in overtime) during the 1989 season.

== Personal life ==
Schnelker died from complications of cancer on December 12, 2016, in Naples, Florida. He was survived by three grandchildren, a daughter, and a brother.
