= 1956 Chicago Cardinals season =

American football team season

- Owner: Violet Bidwill Wolfner
- Head coach: Ray Richards
- Home stadium: Comiskey Park

Results
- Record: 7–5
- Division place: 2nd NFL Eastern
- Playoffs: Did not qualify

The 1956 Chicago Cardinals season marked the team's 37th season in the National Football League (NFL). The Cardinals improved on their previous year's 4–7–1 record by winning seven games for a runner-up finish in the Eastern Conference. Despite their improvement, they failed to qualify for the league's Championship game for the eighth consecutive season.

== Regular season ==
- On October 7, the Cardinals played the New York Giants in front of only 21,799 fans. The week before, against Cleveland in the season opener, the gate was only 20,966. It was the smallest paid attendance of the NFL's six opening week games.

=== Schedule ===
Game	Date	Opponent	Result	Record	Venue	Attendance	Recap	Sources
1	September 30	**Cleveland Browns**	**W** 9–7	1–0	Comiskey Park	20,966	Recap	
2	October 7	**New York Giants**	**W** 35–27	2–0	Comiskey Park	21,799	Recap	
3	October 14	at **Washington Redskins**	**W** 31–3	3–0	Griffith Stadium	25,794	Recap	
4	October 21	at **Philadelphia Eagles**	**W** 20–6	4–0	Connie Mack Stadium	36,545	Recap	
5	October 28	**Washington Redskins**	**L** 14–17	4–1	Comiskey Park	30,553	Recap	
6	November 4	**Philadelphia Eagles**	**W** 28–17	5–1	Comiskey Park	27,609	Recap	
7	November 11	at **New York Giants**	**L** 10–23	5–2	Yankee Stadium	62,410	Recap	
8	November 18	at **Pittsburgh Steelers**	**L** 7–14	5–3	Forbes Field	24,086	Recap	
9	November 25	**Pittsburgh Steelers**	**W** 38–27	6–3	Comiskey Park	17,724	Recap	
10	December 2	Green Bay Packers	**L** 21–24	6–4	Comiskey Park	22,620	Recap	
11	December 9	at Chicago Bears	**L** 3–10	6–5	Wrigley Field	48,606	Recap	
12	December 16	at **Cleveland Browns**	**W** 24–7	7–5	Cleveland Municipal Stadium	25,312	Recap	
Note: Intra-conference opponents are in **bold** text.

== Standings ==
Program for the Cards' October 28 home meeting with the Washington Redskins.

NFL Eastern Conference
	W	L	T	PCT	CONF	PF	PA	STK
New York Giants	8	3	1	.727	7–3	264	197	W1
Chicago Cardinals	7	5	0	.583	7–3	240	182	W1
Washington Redskins	6	6	0	.500	5–5	183	225	L2
Cleveland Browns	5	7	0	.417	4–6	167	177	L1
Pittsburgh Steelers	5	7	0	.417	4–6	217	250	W1
Philadelphia Eagles	3	8	1	.273	3–7	143	215	L3

Note: Tie games were not officially counted in the standings until 1972.

== Personnel ==
=== Staff / Coaches ===
1956 Chicago Cardinals staff
Front office: Principal Owner - Violet Bidwill Wolfner; Managing Director - Walter Wolfner; Head coaches: Head Coach – Ray Richards; Assistant Coach - Charley Trippi; Assistant Coach - Wally Lemm; Assistant Coach / Talent Scout - John Kellison; Offensive coaches: Ends Coach - Bob Nowaskey	Defensive coaches: Defensive Line Coach - Chuck Drulis

=== Roster ===
Official team photo of the 1956 Chicago Cardinals.

1956 Chicago Cardinals roster
Quarterbacks (QB): 8 Lamar McHan; 12 John Roach P; 17 Jim Root; Running backs (RB): 22 Alex Burl; 35 Joe Childress; 44 Dave Mann P; 33 Ollie Matson; 36 Johnny Olszewski; Wide receivers (WR): 83 Max Boydston; 80 Don Stonesifer; Tight ends (TE)	Offensive linemen (OL): 71 Tom Dahms T; 62 John Dittrich G; 64 Doug Hogland G; 76 Harry Jagielski T; 70 Jack Jennings T; 67 Bob Konovsky G; 50 Jack Simmons C; Defensive linemen (DL): 82 Tom Bienemann DE; 65 Ed Husmann MG/G; 75 Tony Pasquesi DT; 84 Leo Sugar DE; 85 Pat Summerall DE/K; 74 Len Teeuws DT/T; 72 Chuck Ulrich DT; 89 Chuck Weber DE; 55 Stan West MG	Linebackers (LB): 57 Carl Brettschneider; 51 Leo Sanford C; Defensive backs (DB): 49 Frank Bernardi CB/RB; 40 Lindon Crow CB; 41 Jimmy Hill S; 81 Night Train Lane CB/WR; 47 Woodley Lewis S; Special teams (ST)	Reserve: -- Ed Cook T (Military); 31 Mal Hammack RB (Military); 21 Tom Keane S (IR); 86 Gern Nagler WR (IR); 24 Julian Spence S (IR); Rookies in italics
