= 1956 New York Giants season =

NFL team season

- Owner: Tim Mara
- Head coach: Jim Lee Howell
- Home stadium: Yankee Stadium

Results
- Record: 8–3–1
- Division place: 1st NFL Eastern
- Playoffs: Won NFL Championship (vs. Bears) 47–7

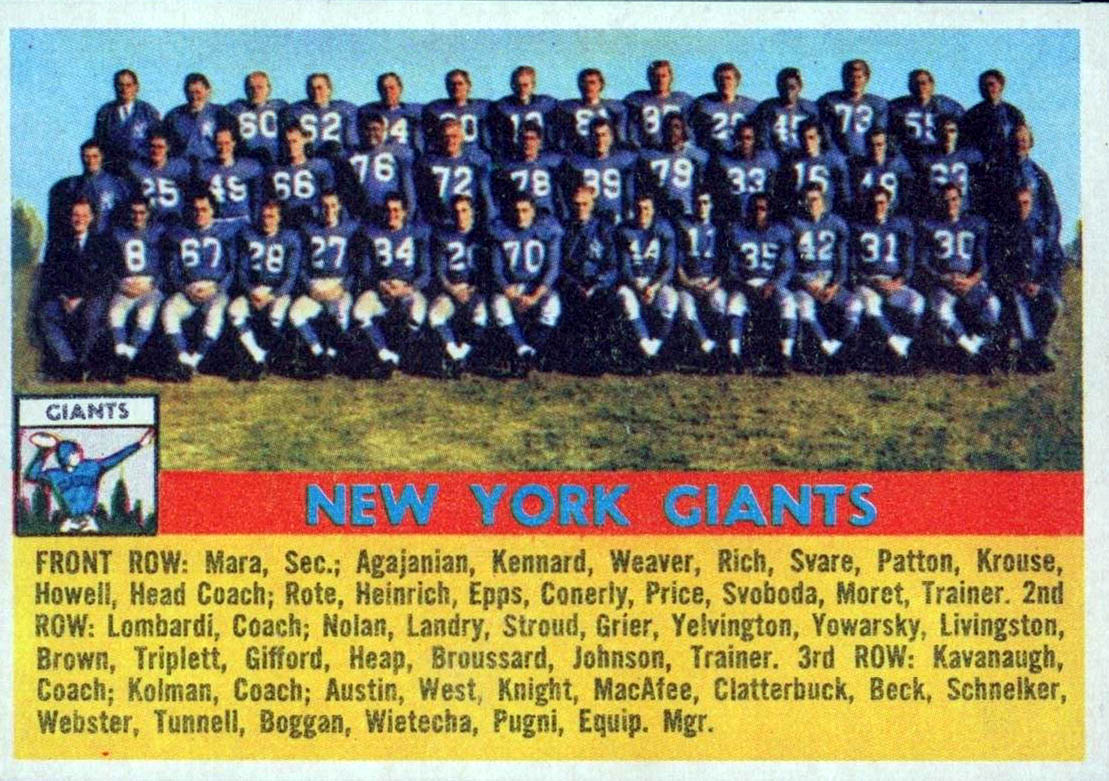
NY Giants team

The 1956 New York Giants season was the franchise's 32nd season in the National Football League. After finishing with an 8–3–1 record, the Giants won their fourth league title by defeating the Chicago Bears 47–7 in the NFL championship game.

The game played at Yankee Stadium saw a field with icy conditions. The Giants used the same tactic in the 1934 title game by wearing sneakers. It was their first NFL title in eighteen years; the Giants did not win another championship until the 1986 season.

== Transactions ==
- July 27, 1956: Andy Robustelli was traded from the Los Angeles Rams to the Giants in exchange for New York's first round selection in the next NFL draft on November 26. The Rams used that pick, the eleventh overall, to select receiver Del Shofner of Baylor.

== Roster ==
1956 New York Giants roster
Quarterbacks (QB): 42 Charlie Conerly; 11 Don Heinrich; 12 Bob Clatterbuck; Running backs (RB): 22 Henry Moore HB; 16 Frank Gifford HB / WR; 33 Mel Triplett FB; 40 Gene Filipski HB; Wide receivers (WR): 80 Ken MacAfee; 44 Kyle Rote RB; Tight ends (TE): 85 Bob Schnelker E; 29 Alex Webster	Offensive linemen (OL): 60 Bill Austin G; 79 Rosey Brown T; 65 Jerry Huth LG; 62 Jack Spinks G; 66 Jack Stroud G; 55 Ray Wietecha C; 72 Dick Yelvington T; Defensive linemen (DL): 61 Ray Beck MG/G/DE; 75 Jim Katcavage DE; 76 Rosey Grier DT; 77 Dick Modzelewski DE; 81 Andy Robustelli DE; 78 Walt Yowarsky DE	Linebackers (LB): 70 Sam Huff MLB; 89 Cliff Livingston LB /DE; 84 Harland Svare /DE; 30 Bill Svoboda; Defensive backs (DB): 48 Ed Hughes CB; 41 Johnny Hermann DB; 25 Dick Nolan CB; 20 Jimmy Patton FS; 27 Herb Rich CB/S; 45 Emlen Tunnell SS; Special teams (ST): 9 Ben Agajanian K; 34 Don Chandler P	Rookies in italics

== Regular season ==
- Through the 1955 season, the Giants played their home games at the Polo Grounds. Their first game at Yankee Stadium was on October 21 against the Pittsburgh Steelers, and the attendance was 48,108.

=== Schedule ===
Game	Date	Opponent	Result	Record	Venue	Attendance	Recap	Sources
1	September 30	at San Francisco 49ers	**W** 38–21	1–0	Kezar Stadium	41,751	Recap	
2	October 7	at **Chicago Cardinals**	**L** 27–35	1–1	Comiskey Park	21,799	Recap	
3	October 14	at **Cleveland Browns**	**W** 21–9	2–1	Cleveland Municipal Stadium	60,042	Recap	
4	October 21	**Pittsburgh Steelers**	**W** 38–10	3–1	Yankee Stadium	48,108	Recap	
5	October 28	**Philadelphia Eagles**	**W** 20–3	4–1	Yankee Stadium	40,960	Recap	
6	November 4	at **Pittsburgh Steelers**	**W** 17–14	5–1	Forbes Field	31,240	Recap	
7	November 11	**Chicago Cardinals**	**W** 23–10	6–1	Yankee Stadium	62,410	Recap	
8	November 18	at **Washington Redskins**	**L** 7–33	6–2	Griffith Stadium	26,261	Recap	
9	November 25	Chicago Bears	**T** 17–17	6–2–1	Yankee Stadium	55,191	Recap	
10	December 2	**Washington Redskins**	**W** 28–14	7–2–1	Yankee Stadium	26,261	Recap	
11	December 9	**Cleveland Browns**	**L** 7–24	7–3–1	Yankee Stadium	27,707	Recap	
12	December 15	at **Philadelphia Eagles**	**W** 21–7	8–3–1	Connie Mack Stadium	16,562	Recap	
Note: Intra-conference opponents are in **bold** text.

=== Postseason ===
Round	Date	Opponent	Result	Venue	Attendance	Recap	Sources
Championship	December 30	Chicago Bears	Yankee Stadium	**W** 47–7	56,836	Recap	

== Game summaries ==
=== Week 1: at San Francisco 49ers ===
Week One: New York Giants at San Francisco 49ers

Quarter	1	2	3	4	Total
Giants	17	7	7	7	38
49ers	0	7	7	7	21

at Kezar Stadium, San Francisco, California

- Date: September 30
- Game attendance: 41,751

Game information

First quarter

- NYG Alex Webster 43-yard pass from Don Heinrich (Frank Gifford kick). Giants 7-0.
- NYG Gifford 59-yard run (Gifford kick). Giants 14-0.
- NYG Gifford 17-yard FG. Giants 17-0.

Second quarter

- NYG Mel Triplett 35-yard pass from Heinrich (Gifford kick). Giants 24-0.
- SF Hugh McElhenny 16-yard run (Gordie Soltau kick). Giants 24-7.

Third quarter

- NYG Triplett 1-yard run (Gifford kick). Giants 31-7.
- SF Billy Wilson 33-yard pass from Y. A. Tittle (Soltau kick). Giants 31-14.

Fourth quarter

- SF McElhenny 2-yard run (Soltau kick). Giants 31-21.
- NYG Triplett 13-yard run (Don Chandler kick). Giants 38-21.

Top passers

- NYG - Don Heinrich - 7/10, 121 yards, 2 TD
- SF - Y.A. Tittle - 25/40, 259 yards, 1 TD, 3 INT

Top rushers

- NYG - Frank Gifford - 8 rushes, 85 yards, 1 TD
- SF - Hugh McElhenny - 13 rushes, 75 yards, 2 TD

Top receivers

- NYG - Alex Webster - 3 receptions, 51 yards, 1 TD
- SF - Dicky Moegle - 3 receptions, 79 yards

=== Week 2: at Chicago Cardinals ===
Week Two: New York Giants at Chicago Cardinals

Quarter	1	2	3	4	Total
Giants	6	7	0	14	27
Cardinals	0	14	14	7	35

at Comiskey Park, Chicago

- Date: October 7
- Game attendance: 21,799

Game information

First quarter

- NYG Triplett 2-yard run (kick failed)

Second quarter

- CHC Lamar McHan 2-yard run (Pat Summerall kick)
- NYG Triplett 2-yard run (Gifford kick)
- CHC Night Train Lane 66-yard interception return (Summerall kick)

Third quarter

- CHC Don Stonesifer 58-yard pass from McHan (Summerall kick)
- CHC Gern Nagler 17-yard pass from McHan (Summerall kick)

Fourth quarter

- CHC McHan 13-yard run (Summerall kick)
- NYG Triplett 1-yard run (Gifford kick)
- NYG Ken MacAfee 4-yard pass from Charlie Conerly (Gifford kick)

=== Week 3: at Cleveland Browns ===
Week Three: New York Giants at Cleveland Browns

Quarter	1	2	3	4	Total
Giants	0	7	7	7	21
Browns	0	7	0	2	9

at Cleveland Municipal Stadium, Cleveland, Ohio

- Date: October 14
- Game attendance: 60,042

Game information

Second quarter

- NYG Webster 2-yard pass from Heinrich (Gifford kick)
- CLE Ed Modzelewski 1-yard run (Lou Groza kick)

Third quarter

- NYG Webster 1-yard run (Chandler kick)

Fourth quarter

- NYG Webster 34-yard run (Chandler kick)
- CLE Junior Wren tackled Conerly in end zone for a Safety

=== Week 4: vs. Pittsburgh Steelers ===
Week Four: Pittsburgh Steelers at New York Giants

Quarter	1	2	3	4	Total
Steelers	3	0	0	7	10
Giants	0	17	14	7	38

at Yankee Stadium, New York City

- Date: October 21
- Game attendance: 48,108

Game information

First quarter

- PIT Gary Glick 35-yard FG

Second quarter

- NYG MacAfee 14-yard pass from Conerly (Ben Agajanian kick)
- NYG Webster 21-yard pass from Conerly (Agajanian kick)
- NYG Agajanian 14-yard FG

Third quarter

- NYG Gifford 1-yard run (Agajanian kick)
- NYG Kyle Rote 19-yard pass from Conerly (Agajanian kick)

Fourth quarter

- PIT Elbie Nickel 14-yard pass from Ted Marchibroda (Glick kick)
- NYG Gene Filipski 35-yard run (Agajanian kick)

=== Week 5: vs. Philadelphia Eagles ===
Week Five: Philadelphia Eagles at New York Giants

Quarter	1	2	3	4	Total
Eagles	3	0	0	0	3
Giants	3	10	7	0	20

at Yankee Stadium, New York

- Date: October 28
- Game attendance: 40,960

Game information

First quarter

- PHI Bobby Walston 15-yard FG
- NYG Agajanian 20-yard FG

Second quarter

- NYG Agajanian 39-yard FG
- NYG Webster 1-yard run (Agajanian kick)

Third quarter

- NYG Gifford 20-yard pass from Conerly (Agajanian kick)

=== Week 6: at Pittsburgh Steelers ===
Week Six: New York Giants at Pittsburgh Steelers

Quarter	1	2	3	4	Total
Giants	7	3	7	0	17
Steelers	0	0	7	7	14

at Forbes Field, Pittsburgh, Pennsylvania

- Date: November 4
- Game attendance: 31,240

Game information

First quarter

- NYG Webster 1-yard run (Agajanian kick)

Second quarter

- NYG Agajanian 32-yard FG

Third quarter

- PIT Sid Watson 1-yard run (Glick kick)
- NYG Rote 3-yard pass from Conerly (Agajanian kick)

Fourth quarter

- PIT Watson 6-yard run (Glick kick)

=== Week 7: vs. Chicago Cardinals ===
Week Seven: Chicago Cardinals at New York Giants

Quarter	1	2	3	4	Total
Cardinals	0	3	0	7	10
Giants	2	7	7	7	23

at Yankee Stadium, New York

- Date: November 11
- Game attendance: 62,410

Game information

First quarter

- NYG Andy Robustelli tackled Dave Mann in end zone for a Safety

Second quarter

- NYG MacAfee 6-yard pass from Heinrich (Agajanian kick)
- CHC Summerall 30-yard FG

Third quarter

- NYG Webster 12-yard run (Agajanian kick)

Fourth quarter

- NYG Gifford 11-yard pass from Conerly (Agajanian kick)
- CHC Ollie Matson 11-yard pass from Jim Root (Summerall kick)

=== Week 8: at Washington Redskins ===
Week Eight: New York Giants at Washington Redskins

Quarter	1	2	3	4	Total
Giants	0	0	7	0	7
Redskins	7	17	3	6	33

at Griffith Stadium, Washington, D.C.

- Date: November 18
- Game attendance: 26,261

Game information

First quarter

- WAS Billy Wells 15-yard run (Sam Baker kick)

Second quarter

- WAS Johnny Carson 7-yard pass from Al Dorow (Baker kick)
- WAS Baker 49-yard FG
- WAS Wells recovered fumble in end zone (Baker kick)

Third quarter

- WAS Baker 28-yard FG
- NYG Bob Schnelker 12-yard pass from Conerly (Agajanian kick)

Fourth quarter

- WAS Steve Meilinger 51-yard pass from Dorow (kick failed)

=== Week 9: vs. Chicago Bears ===
Week Nine: Chicago Bears at New York Giants

Quarter	1	2	3	4	Total
Bears	0	0	3	14	17
Giants	3	7	7	0	17

at Yankee Stadium, New York

- Date: November 25
- Game attendance: 56,836

Game information

First quarter

- NYG Agajanian 17-yard FG

Second quarter

- NYG Rote 17-yard pass from Heinrich (Agajanian kick)

Third quarter

- NYG Webster 2-yard run (Agajanian kick)
- CHB George Blanda 22-yard FG

Fourth quarter

- CHB Harlon Hill 79-yard pass from Bill McColl (Blanda kick)
- CHB Hill 56-yard pass from Ed Brown (Blanda kick)

=== Week 10: vs. Washington Redskins ===
Week Ten: Washington Redskins at New York Giants

Quarter	1	2	3	4	Total
Redskins	7	0	0	7	14
Giants	14	0	7	7	28

at Yankee Stadium, New York

- Date: December 2
- Game attendance: 46,361

Game information

First quarter

- NYG MacAfee 29-yard pass from Gifford (Agajanian kick)
- NYG Gifford 6-yard run (Agajanian kick)
- WAS Meilinger 6-yard pass from Dorow (Baker kick)

Third quarter

- NYG Gifford 14-yard pass from Conerly (Agajanian kick)

Fourth quarter

- NYG Gifford 11-yard run (Agajanian kick)
- WAS John Paluck 76-yard fumble return (Baker kick)

=== Week 11: vs. Cleveland Browns ===
Week Eleven: Cleveland Browns at New York Giants

Quarter	1	2	3	4	Total
Browns	7	10	7	0	24
Giants	0	7	0	0	7

at Yankee Stadium, New York

- Date: December 9
- Game attendance: 27,707

Game information

First quarter

- CLE Tommy O'Connell 1-yard run (Groza kick)

Second quarter

- NYG Gifford 6-yard pass from Conerly (Agajanian kick)
- CLE Groza 41-yard FG
- CLE Curly Morrison 6-yard pass from O'Connell (Groza kick)

Third quarter

- CLE O'Connell 1-yard run (Groza kick)

=== Week 12: at Philadelphia Eagles ===
Week Twelve: New York Giants at Philadelphia Eagles

Quarter	1	2	3	4	Total
Giants	0	14	7	0	21
Eagles	0	0	0	7	7

at Connie Mack Stadium, Philadelphia

- Date: December 15
- Game attendance: 15,562

Game information

Second quarter

- NYG Rote 6-yard pass from Gifford (Agajanian kick)
- NYG Gifford 10-yard run (Agajanian kick)

Third quarter

- NYG Webster 7-yard run (Agajanian kick)

Fourth quarter

- PHI Walston 15-yard pass from Adrian Burk (Walston kick)

=== Standings ===
NFL Eastern Conference
	W	L	T	PCT	CONF	PF	PA	STK
New York Giants	8	3	1	.727	7–3	264	197	W1
Chicago Cardinals	7	5	0	.583	7–3	240	182	W1
Washington Redskins	6	6	0	.500	5–5	183	225	L2
Cleveland Browns	5	7	0	.417	4–6	167	177	L1
Pittsburgh Steelers	5	7	0	.417	4–6	217	250	W1
Philadelphia Eagles	3	8	1	.273	3–7	143	215	L3

Note: Tie games were not officially counted in the standings until 1972.

NFL Western Conference
	W	L	T	PCT	CONF	PF	PA	STK
Chicago Bears	9	2	1	.818	8–2	363	246	W2
Detroit Lions	9	3	0	.750	8–2	300	188	L1
San Francisco 49ers	5	6	1	.455	5–5	233	284	W3
Baltimore Colts	5	7	0	.417	3–7	270	322	W1
Los Angeles Rams	4	8	0	.333	3–7	291	307	W2
Green Bay Packers	4	8	0	.333	3–7	264	342	L2

Note: Tie games were not officially counted in the standings until 1972.

== NFL Championship Game ==
1956 NFL Championship: Chicago Bears at New York Giants

Quarter	1	2	3	4	Total
Bears	0	7	0	0	7
Giants	13	21	6	7	47

at Yankee Stadium, New York

- Date: December 30
- Game attendance: 56,836

Game information

First quarter

- NYG Triplett 17-yard run (Agajanian kick). Giants 7-0.
- NYG Agajanian 17-yard FG. Giants 10-0.
- NYG Agajanian 43-yard FG. Giants 13-0.

Second quarter

- NYG Webster 3-yard run (Agajanian kick). Giants 20-0.
- CHB Rick Casares 9-yard run (Blanda kick). Giants 20-7.
- NYG Webster 1-yard run (Agajanian kick). Giants 27-7.
- NYG Henry Moore recovered blocked punt in end zone (Agajanian kick). Giants 34-7.

Third quarter

- NYG Rote 9-yard pass from Conerly (kick failed). Giants 40-7.

Fourth quarter

- NYG Gifford 14-yard pass from Conerly (Agajanian kick). Giants 47-7.

Top passers

- CHI - George Blanda - 12/27, 140 yards, 1 INT
- NYG - Charlie Conerly - 7/10, 195 yards, 2 TD

Top rushers

- CHI - Rick Casares - 14 rushes, 43 yards, 1 TD
- NYG - Mel Triplett - 13 rushes, 71 yards, 1 TD

Top receivers

- CHI - Harlon Hill - 6 receptions, 87 yards
- NYG - Frank Gifford - 4 receptions, 131 yards, 1 TD

== Roster ==
1956 New York Giants roster
Quarterbacks (QB): 12 Bob Clatterbuck; 42 Charlie Conerly; 11 Don Heinrich; Running backs (RB): 40 Gene Filipski; 16 Frank Gifford K; 22 Henry Moore; 33 Mel Triplett; 29 Alex Webster; Wide receivers (WR): 80 Ken MacAfee; 44 Kyle Rote; 85 Bob Schnelker; Tight ends (TE)	Offensive linemen (OL): 60 Bill Austin G; 79 Rosey Brown T; 65 Gerry Huth G; 66 Jack Stroud G; 55 Ray Wietecha C; 72 Dick Yelvington T; Defensive linemen (DL): 71 Rosey Grier DT; 75 Jim Katcavage DE/DT; 77 Dick Modzelewski DT; 81 Andy Robustelli DE; 78 Walt Yowarsky DE	Linebackers (LB): 61 Ray Beck MLB/G; 70 Sam Huff MLB; 89 Cliff Livingston OLB/DE; 84 Harland Svare OLB; 30 Bill Svoboda OLB; Defensive backs (DB): 48 Ed Hughes CB; 25 Dick Nolan CB; 20 Jimmy Patton S; 45 Emlen Tunnell S; Special teams (ST): 9 Ben Agajanian K; 34 Don Chandler P/K	Reserve: -- Bobby Epps RB (Military); -- Pete Mangum LB (Military); 27 Herb Rich S (IR); -- Bob Topp WR (Military); 62 Jack Spinks G (IR); Rookies in italics

== Awards and honors ==
- Rosey Brown, All-Pro selection
- Sam Huff, All-Pro selection
- Sam Huff, Rookie of the Year
- Frank Gifford, NFL MVP
- Frank Gifford, All-Pro selection
- Frank Gifford ranked fifth in the league with 819 rushing yards, first with 5.2 yards per carry, and third in receiving with 51 catches for 603 yards. No other player had reached the Top 5 in all of these categories before Gifford.
- Rosey Grier, All-Pro selection
- Andy Robustelli, All-Pro selection
- Emlen Tunnell, All-Pro selection

== See also ==
- List of New York Giants seasons

Preceded by Cleveland Browns; 1955	NFL champion 1956	Succeeded by Detroit Lions; 1957
