= 1956 Chicago Bears season =

NFL team season

- Owner: George Halas
- Head coach: Paddy Driscoll
- Home stadium: Wrigley Field

Results
- Record: 9–2–1
- Division place: 1st NFL Western
- Playoffs: Lost NFL Championship (at Giants) 7–47

The 1956 season was the Chicago Bears' 37th in the National Football League. The team improved on their 8–4 record from 1955 and finished with a 9–2–1 record, under first-year head coach Paddy Driscoll to win the Western Conference and played in their first NFL championship game since 1946.

The title game against the New York Giants was at Yankee Stadium and the Giants won, 47–7.

== Schedule ==
Week	Date	Opponent	Result	Record	Venue	Attendance	Recap
1	September 30	at **Baltimore Colts**	**L** 21–28	0–1	Memorial Stadium	45,221	Recap
2	October 7	at **Green Bay Packers**	**W** 37–21	1–1	City Stadium	24,668	Recap
3	October 14	**San Francisco 49ers**	**W** 31–7	2–1	Wrigley Field	47,526	Recap
4	October 21	**Baltimore Colts**	**W** 58–27	3–1	Wrigley Field	48,364	Recap
5	October 28	at **San Francisco 49ers**	**W** 38–21	4–1	Kezar Stadium	52,612	Recap
6	November 4	at **Los Angeles Rams**	**W** 35–24	5–1	L.A. Memorial Coliseum	69,894	Recap
7	November 11	**Green Bay Packers**	**W** 38–14	6–1	Wrigley Field	49,172	Recap
8	November 18	**Los Angeles Rams**	**W** 30–21	7–1	Wrigley Field	48,102	Recap
9	November 25	at New York Giants	**T** 17–17	7–1–1	Yankee Stadium	55,191	Recap
10	December 2	at **Detroit Lions**	**L** 10–42	7–2–1	Briggs Stadium	57,024	Recap
11	December 9	Chicago Cardinals	**W** 10–3	8–2–1	Wrigley Field	48,606	Recap
12	December 16	**Detroit Lions**	**W** 38–21	9–2–1	Wrigley Field	49,086	Recap
Note: Intra-conference opponents are in **bold** text.

== Postseason ==
Round	Date	Opponent	Result	Venue	Attendance	Recap
Championship	December 30	New York Giants	L 7–47	Yankee Stadium	56,836	Recap

=== Standings ===
Program for the October 14 game against the visiting San Francisco 49ers.

NFL Western Conference
	W	L	T	PCT	CONF	PF	PA	STK
Chicago Bears	9	2	1	.818	8–2	363	246	W2
Detroit Lions	9	3	0	.750	8–2	300	188	L1
San Francisco 49ers	5	6	1	.455	5–5	233	284	W3
Baltimore Colts	5	7	0	.417	3–7	270	322	W1
Los Angeles Rams	4	8	0	.333	3–7	291	307	W2
Green Bay Packers	4	8	0	.333	3–7	264	342	L2

Note: Tie games were not officially counted in the standings until 1972.

== Roster ==
Chicago Bears 1956 roster
Quarterbacks: 16 George Blanda K; 15 Ed Brown P; 11 Jim Haluska; Running backs: 46 Don Bingham; 35 Rick Casares; 89 John Hoffman; 45 Bobby Watkins; Receivers: 43 Jim Dooley; 87 Harlon Hill; 83 Bill McColl; 88 Gene Schroeder	Offensive linemen: 65 Herman Clark G; 62 Kline Gilbert T; 78 Stan Jones G; 54 Dick Klawitter C; 76 John Mellekas T; 67 Tom Roggeman G; 55 Larry Strickland C; 72 Bill Wightkin T; Defensive linemen: 81 Doug Atkins DE; 73 Bill Bishop DT; 63 M. L. Brackett DE/DT; 82 Jack Hoffman DE; 86 Ed Meadows DE; 75 Fred Williams DT	Linebackers: 31 Joe Fortunato OLB; 61 Bill George MLB; 51 Wayne Hansen OLB; Defensive backs: 25 J. C. Caroline CB/RB; 80 John Helwig CB; 29 McNeil Moore S; 20 Ray Gene Smith CB; 40 Stan Wallace S	Reserve list: 12 Zeke Bratkowski QB/P (Military); 41 Harland Carl RB (IR); -- Ron Drzewiecki RB (Military); 21 Perry Jeter RB (IR); 26 Charlie Sumner CB (Military); Rookies in italics
