= 1956 NFL season =

American football season

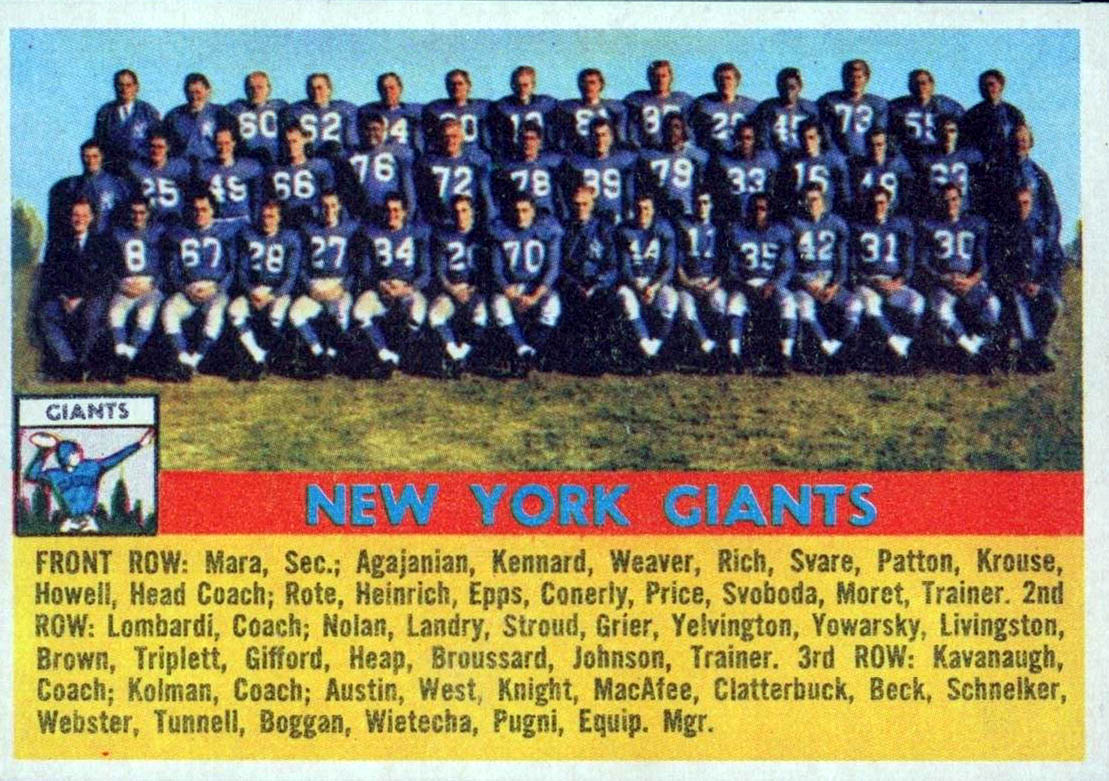
- NY Giants, champions

Regular season
- Duration: September 30 – December 23, 1956
- East Champions: New York Giants
- West Champions: Chicago Bears

Championship Game
- Champions: New York Giants

The 1956 NFL season was the 37th regular season of the National Football League.

With previous television partner DuMont Television Network ending operations prior to the 1956 season, CBS began carrying regular season games of 11 of its 12 member clubs across its network nationwide.

The season ended when the New York Giants defeated the Chicago Bears in the NFL Championship Game, 47–7.

== Draft ==
NFL teams: West, East

The 1956 NFL draft was held on November 28, 1955, and January 17–18, 1956 at The Warwick and the Bellevue-Stratford Hotel in Philadelphia and the Ambassador Hotel in Los Angeles. With the first pick, the Pittsburgh Steelers selected quarterback and safety Gary Glick from the Colorado State University.

== Major rule changes ==
- It is now illegal to grab an opponent's facemask (other than the ball carrier): changed to all players in 1962.
- Using radio receivers to communicate with players on the field is prohibited.
- The ball for night games was changed from white with black stripes to brown with white stripes.

== Division races ==
The Lions and the Cardinals had both finished 1955 poorly, 3–9 and 4–7–1, but both got off to fast starts in 1956. Both ended up finishing second in the Division races.

The Chicago Cardinals got off to their best start ever, going 4–0, until the Redskins beat them 17–14 on October 28. At the midway point, they and the Giants both had 5–1 records. In the Western Division, the Detroit Lions roared to a 6–0 start. In Week Seven (November 11), the Giants pulled ahead with a 23–10 win over the Cards. In Washington, the Lions finally lost. Trapped on his own 1-yard line, Yale Lary took a safety in order to get a free kick. That, and Sam Baker's field goal, gave the Redskins an 18–10 lead to put the game out of reach, and the Lions lost 18–17. The Bears, who had dropped their opener at Baltimore, 28–21, beat Green Bay 38–14 for their sixth straight game, matching Detroit's 6–1 record.

In Week Nine, the Lions dropped their Thanksgiving Day game as Tobin Rote guided Green Bay to three last-quarter touchdowns in a 24–20 win. On Sunday, the Cards 38–27 win over Pittsburgh put them a half game out. The Bears avoided a loss, while the Giants watched a win elude them, as Harlon Hill caught a last-ditch 56-yard touchdown pass from Ed Brown in tying the Giants, 17–17. Both the Bears and the Giants continued to lead their conferences, but only by half a game.

The Cards lost the next two games and any chance at the Eastern title, which the Giants clinched, in part because of a 28–14 win over Washington on December 2. The Western race came down to the Bears and Lions. In Week Ten (December 2), the Lions hosted the Bears and won 42–10, to take the lead. When both teams won the following week, the trip to the championship came down to December 16, the last game of the season, which would have the 9–2 Detroit Lions visiting the 8–2–1 Chicago Bears, who hadn't forgotten the earlier drubbing. The game at Wrigley Field was marked by numerous fights, including a fourth quarter melee involving players, fans, and the police, and a vicious hit well behind the play by the Bears' Ed Meadows that knocked Detroit quarterback Bobby Layne out of the game with a concussion. So, the Bears exacted their revenge with a 38–21 victory. After the game Lions' coach Buddy Parker appealed to the commissioner to punish what the Lions felt was the dirty play of George Halas's Bears, but no ruling was forthcoming.

| Week | Western | | Eastern | |
|---|---|---|---|---|
| 1 | 3 teams (Bal, Det, LA) | 1–0–0 | 3 teams (Cards, NYG, Pit) | 1–0–0 |
| 2 | Detroit Lions | 2–0–0 | Chicago Cardinals | 2–0–0 |
| 3 | Detroit Lions | 3–0–0 | Chicago Cardinals | 3–0–0 |
| 4 | Detroit Lions | 4–0–0 | Chicago Cardinals | 4–0–0 |
| 5 | Detroit Lions | 5–0–0 | Tie (Cards, NYG) | 4–1–0 |
| 6 | Detroit Lions | 6–0–0 | Tie (Cards, NYG) | 5–1–0 |
| 7 | Tie (Bears, Lions) | 6–1–0 | New York Giants | 6–1–0 |
| 8 | Tie (Bears, Lions) | 7–1–0 | New York Giants | 6–2–0 |
| 9 | Chicago Bears | 7–1–1 | New York Giants | 7–1–1 |
| 10 | Detroit Lions | 8–2–0 | New York Giants | 7–2–1 |
| 11 | Detroit Lions | 9–2–0 | New York Giants | 7–3–1 |
| 12 | Chicago Bears | 9–2–1 | New York Giants | 8–3–1 |

== Final standings ==
NFL Eastern Conference
| | W | L | T | PCT | CONF | PF | PA | STK |
|---|---|---|---|---|---|---|---|---|
| New York Giants | 8 | 3 | 1 | .727 | 7–3 | 264 | 197 | W1 |
| Chicago Cardinals | 7 | 5 | 0 | .583 | 7–3 | 240 | 182 | W1 |
| Washington Redskins | 6 | 6 | 0 | .500 | 5–5 | 183 | 225 | L2 |
| Cleveland Browns | 5 | 7 | 0 | .417 | 4–6 | 167 | 177 | L1 |
| Pittsburgh Steelers | 5 | 7 | 0 | .417 | 4–6 | 217 | 250 | W1 |
| Philadelphia Eagles | 3 | 8 | 1 | .273 | 3–7 | 143 | 215 | L3 |

Note: Tie games were not officially counted in the standings until 1972.

NFL Western Conference
| | W | L | T | PCT | CONF | PF | PA | STK |
|---|---|---|---|---|---|---|---|---|
| Chicago Bears | 9 | 2 | 1 | .818 | 8–2 | 363 | 246 | W2 |
| Detroit Lions | 9 | 3 | 0 | .750 | 8–2 | 300 | 188 | L1 |
| San Francisco 49ers | 5 | 6 | 1 | .455 | 5–5 | 233 | 284 | W3 |
| Baltimore Colts | 5 | 7 | 0 | .417 | 3–7 | 270 | 322 | W1 |
| Los Angeles Rams | 4 | 8 | 0 | .333 | 3–7 | 291 | 307 | W2 |
| Green Bay Packers | 4 | 8 | 0 | .333 | 3–7 | 264 | 342 | L2 |

== NFL Championship Game ==
NY Giants 47, Chi. Bears 7 at Yankee Stadium, New York City, December 30, 1956

== Awards ==
- NEA NFL Most Valuable Player – Frank Gifford, New York Giants
- UPI NFL Most Valuable Player – Frank Gifford, New York Giants
- Sporting News NFL Player of the Year – Frank Gifford, New York Giants

== Coaching changes ==
- Chicago Bears: George Halas stepped down as head coach and was replaced by Paddy Driscoll.
- Philadelphia Eagles: Jim Trimble was replaced by Hugh Devore.
- San Francisco 49ers: Red Strader was replaced by Frankie Albert.

== Stadium changes ==
The New York Giants moved from the Polo Grounds to Yankee Stadium
