= Mel Triplett =

American football player (1930–2002)

No. 33
- Position: Fullback

Personal information
- Born: December 24, 1931; Indianola, Mississippi, U.S.
- Died: July 25, 2002 (aged 70); Toledo, Ohio, U.S.
- Listed height: 6 ft 1 in (1.85 m)
- Listed weight: 215 lb (98 kg)

Career information
- High school: Girard (Girard, Ohio)
- College: Toledo (1951–1954)
- NFL draft: 1955: 5th round, 56th overall pick

Career history
- New York Giants (1955–1960); Minnesota Vikings (1961–1962)

Awards and highlights
- NFL champion (1956); Toledo Rockets No. 82 retired

Career NFL statistics
- Rushing yards: 2,856
- Rushing average: 4.2
- Receptions: 43
- Receiving yards: 439
- Total touchdowns: 18
- Stats at Pro Football Reference

Melvin Christopher Triplett (December 24, 1931 – July 25, 2002) was an American football fullback. He played eight years in the National Football League (NFL) for the New York Giants (1955–1960) and Minnesota Vikings (1961–1962). He played college football for the Toledo Rockets from 1951 to 1954.

== Early life ==
Triplett was born in 1930 at Indianola, Mississippi. He moved with his family to Ohio and played football at Girard High School in Girard, Ohio. He was inducted into the Girard Hall of Fame in 1997.

Triplett enrolled at the University of Toledo. He led the 1954 Toledo Rockets football team to a 6–2–1 record, rushing for 803 yards. He was inducted into the University of Toledo Athletic Hall of Fame in 1983.

== Professional football ==
Triplett was selected by the New York Giants in the fifth round, 56th overall pick, of the 1955 NFL draft. He played at the fullback position for the Giants from 1955 to 1960. He scored the opening touchdown against the Chicago Bears in the 1956 NFL Championship Game, won by the Giants 47–7. He was named New York's outstanding offensive player in the game. In 1960, he ranked ninth in the NFL with 573 rushing yards.

On July 1, 1961, Triplett was traded by the Giants to the Minnesota Vikings as part of a seven-player deal. He played for the Vikings in 1961 and 1962.

In seven NFL seasons, Triplett totaled 2,857 yards and 14 touchdowns.

Triplett's younger brother Bill Triplett played 11 years in the NFL.

Among the fans of Mel Triplett during his days on the New York Giants was a young basketball player in New York named Lew Alcindor, later Kareem Abdul-Jabbar. Abdul-Jabbar says in his 1983 memoir Giant Steps that it was largely Triplett's wearing of uniform No. 33 that made Abdul-Jabbar adopt No. 33 as well, a number he made famous.

== Later life ==
Triplett became diabetic and spent the last few months of his life at a Toledo nursing home. He died in 2002 at age 71 in Toledo, Ohio.
