= 1956 NFL Championship Game =

Coordinates: 40.827°N 73.928°W

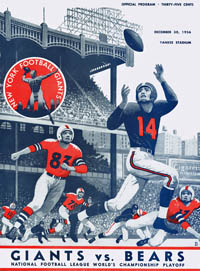
Chicago Bears (Western) (9–2–1)	New York Giants (Eastern) (8–3–1)
7	47
Head coach: Paddy Driscoll	Head coach: Jim Lee Howell
	1	2	3	4	Total
CHI	0	7	0	0	7
NYG	13	21	6	7	47
- Date: December 30, 1956
- Stadium: Yankee Stadium; Bronx, New York
- Attendance: 56,836

TV in the United States
- Network: NBC
- Announcers: Chris Schenkel, Jack Brickhouse, and Red Grange

Radio in the United States
- Network: NBC
- Announcers: Ray Scott

Location in the United States

The 1956 NFL Championship Game was the league's 24th championship game, played at Yankee Stadium in The Bronx in New York City on December 30.

== Background ==
The New York Giants (8–3–1) won the Eastern Conference title and hosted the Chicago Bears (9–2–1), the Western Conference champions. The teams had met in the regular season five weeks earlier on November 25 at Yankee Stadium and played to a 17–17 tie; the Bears entered the championship game in late December as slight favorites. The Giants hosted because the home field for the title game alternated between the conferences; home field advantage was not implemented until 1975.

Both teams had been absent from the league title game for a decade, when the Bears won the championship over the Giants at the Polo Grounds in 1946. The Giants' most recent NFL title was before World War II, in 1938. The 1956 season marked the Giants' first at Yankee Stadium, moving across the Harlem River from the Polo Grounds. This was the first championship since 1949 without the Cleveland Browns, who had appeared in six consecutive since joining the NFL in 1950.

The 1956 Giants featured a number of Hall of Fame players, including safety Emlen Tunnell, running back Frank Gifford, offensive tackle Roosevelt Brown, linebacker Sam Huff, and defensive end Andy Robustelli. Two assistants of Giants head coach Jim Lee Howell, offensive coordinator Vince Lombardi and defensive coordinator Tom Landry, later became Hall of Fame head coaches with other franchises; Lombardi coached the Green Bay Packers to five NFL Championships during the 1960s and Landry led the Dallas Cowboys to five Super Bowls, with two wins, during the 1970s. He was the head coach of the Cowboys for 29 seasons, through 1988.

== Game summary ==
The game was played on an icy field, with temperatures hovering around 20 °F (−7 °C). To adjust to the slick conditions, the Giants opted to wear sneakers instead of traditional football cleats. The advantage the white sneakers provided in footing was cited as a major factor in New York's romp. Twenty-two years earlier on an icy Polo Grounds field, the Giants had employed the same tactic and beat the Bears to win the 1934 NFL Championship Game in the famous "Sneakers Game."

The Giants opened with a 53-yard kick return from rookie halfback Gene Filipski and scored a touchdown 3 plays later. On the Bears first play from scrimmage, Bears quarterback Ed Brown fumbled the handoff to Rick Casares which was recovered by the Giants. 38-year-old Ben Agajanian kicked 17-yard field goal after the offense went three and out. On the Bears next drive, Brown was intercepted by Jim Patton, and Agajanian kicked another field goal, giving the Giants a 13–0 lead. The Bears then turned the ball over on downs in their own end to end the first quarter.

On the ensuing drive, Alex Webster took a 22-yard catch and run from quarterback Charlie Conerly setting up a 3-yard touchdown run, increasing the lead to 20–0. George Blanda and the Bears responded with a touchdown drive of their own, but Webster broke the Bears collective backs on the next Giants drive when he sidestepped a screen pass for a 50-yard gain and scored a 1-yard touchdown run, his second of the first half. The Giants scored another touchdown when they blocked a punt in the end zone and recovered, leading 34–7 at halftime. The Giants scored two more second half touchdowns, and coasted to a 47–7 win before 56,836.

The 1956 NFL title was the Giants' fourth; they played in five of the six title games from 1958 through 1963, but did not win any of them. After the 1956 title, it was another thirty years before their next, Super Bowl XXI in January 1987. Although the home team, the Giants wore their white jerseys and the Bears their navy blue. New York's custom at the time was to alternate between blue and white jerseys at home. The blue jerseys were designated as the "home jerseys" beginning in 1957, while the white tops served as inspiration for the Giants current road uniforms they started wearing in 2005.

=== Scoring summary ===
Sunday, December 30, 1956
Kickoff: 2:05 p.m. EST

- First quarter
  - NY – Mel Triplett 17 run (Ben Agajanian kick), 7–0 NY
  - NY – FG Agajanian 17, 10–0 NY
  - NY – FG Agajanian 43, 13–0 NY
- Second quarter
  - NY – Alex Webster 3 run (Agajanian kick), 20-0 NY
  - CHI – Rick Casares 9 run (George Blanda kick), 20–7 NY
  - NY – Webster 1 run (Agajanian kick), 27–7 NY
  - NY – Henry Moore recovered blocked punt in end zone (Agajanian kick), 34–7 NY
- Third quarter
  - NY – Kyle Rote 9-yard pass from Charlie Conerly (kick failed), 40–7 NY
- Fourth quarter
  - NY – Frank Gifford 14-yard pass from Conerly (Agajanian kick), 47–7 NY

== Officials ==
- Referee: William Downes
- Umpire: Samuel Wilson
- Head linesman: Cleo Diehl
- Back judge: Don Looney
- Field judge: George Rennix

The NFL had five game officials in 1956; the line judge was added in 1965 and the side judge in 1978. A total of twelve officials were on hand for this championship: the game crew, a full alternate crew (headed by referee Ron Gibbs), and two to operate the clock.

== Players' shares ==
The gross receipts for the game, including $205,000 for radio and television rights, were over $517,000, the highest to date. Each player on the winning Giants team received $3,779, while Bears players made $2,485 each.

== See also ==
- 1956 NFL season
- History of the NFL championship
- Bears–Giants rivalry
