= NFL on DuMont =

American television program

- Starring: See announcers section below
- Country of origin: United States
- No. of seasons: 4

Production
- Running time: 180 minutes or until game ends

Original release
- Network: DuMont
- Release: 1951 – 1955

The NFL on DuMont is an American television program that broadcast National Football League (NFL) games on the now defunct DuMont Television Network. The program ran from 1951 to 1955.

== History ==
DuMont's NFL coverage consisted of contracts the network signed with individual NFL teams. Only for the NFL Championship Game did the network actually sign a contract with the league. Some teams did not have deals with DuMont; instead selling television rights to local stations, independent producers, or breweries who were major sponsors and who also packaged the telecasts.

=== 1951-1952 ===
Locally and regionally televised games were broadcast as early as 1939, but on December 23, 1951, DuMont televised the first ever live, coast-to-coast professional football game, the NFL Championship Game between the Los Angeles Rams and Cleveland Browns. DuMont paid $75,000 for the rights to broadcast the game.

In 1952, DuMont only aired New York Giants games before moving to a more national scope the following season.

=== 1953-1954 ===
During the 1953 and 1954 seasons, DuMont broadcast Saturday night NFL games. It was the first time that National Football League games were televised live, coast-to-coast, in prime time, for the entire season. This predated Monday Night Football on ABC by 17 years. Several of the games in 1953 and 1954 originated in New York (Giants), Pittsburgh (Steelers), or Washington (Redskins). (All three of these cities had DuMont O&Os.)

From 1953-55, DuMont televised the Thanksgiving NFL games between the Detroit Lions and the Green Bay Packers.

DuMont was nominated for Emmy Awards for its coverage of the 1953 and 1954 seasons but did not win.

DuMont proved to be a less than ideal choice for a national broadcaster. The network had only eighteen primary affiliates in 1954, dwarfed by the 120 available to NBC (although a number of ABC, CBS, and NBC affiliates that had DuMont "secondary" affiliations did carry some NFL games, mainly on Sunday afternoons). Coverage of Canadian football's "Big Four" was more readily available on NBC than NFL games were in most markets on DuMont.

=== 1955 ===
In January 1955, DuMont obtained rights from the Los Angeles Newspaper Charities to cover the Pro Bowl only one week before the game date. As they had trouble lining up affiliates to cover the game on such short notice, the telecast was cancelled.

By 1955, the DuMont network was beginning to crumble. For instance, in 1955, NBC replaced DuMont as the network for the NFL Championship Game, paying a rights fee of $100,000. ABC acquired the rights to the Thanksgiving game. Meanwhile, most teams (sans the Giants, Eagles and Steelers, who received regionalized coverage from DuMont) were left to fend for themselves in terms of TV coverage.

Consequently, this is roughly how coverage went for each team in 1955:

- Colts - local coverage
- Bears - ABC home games
- Cardinals - ABC home games
- Browns - regional coverage, sponsored and produced by Carling Beer
- Lions - local coverage
- Packers - no coverage
- Rams - ABC Pacific
- Giants - DuMont regional
- Eagles - DuMont regional
- Steelers - DuMont regional
- 49ers - ABC Pacific
- Redskins - regional coverage, sponsored and produced by Amoco Gasoline

The October 17, 1955 issue of Sports Illustrated lists Chicago Cardinals-New York game as not televised. However, an article on this game in October 16, 1955 issue of the New York Times states, "(t)he game will be telecast but will be blacked out within a 75 mile radius of New York City." Meanwhile, the October 31, 1955 issue of Sports Illustrated lists the Chicago Bears-Los Angeles game as being televised. If so, it could have been televised as a syndicated pick up. Bob Wolff is listed as doing play-by-play for the Giants game for DuMont, so Chris Schenkel could have made the call here.

DuMont ceased most entertainment programs (and a nightly newscast) in early April 1955. DuMont still broadcast some sports events (a Monday-night boxing show and the 1955 NFL season) until either August 1956, or Thanksgiving 1957. Prior to the 1956 NFL season, DuMont sold its broadcast rights to CBS; for DuMont's last broadcast in 1957, a high school football state championship, it borrowed Chris Schenkel, CBS's announcer for New York Giants broadcasts at the time.

== Announcers ==
DuMont normally used a single announcer for its telecasts, a common practice then but a departure from modern practice where a play-by-play announcer is paired with a color commentator. Several of DuMont's championship game broadcasts did have color commentators.

- Frankie Albert
- Jim Britt
- Ken Coleman
- John Fitzgerald
- Earl Gillespie
- Red Grange
- Tom Harmon
- Herman Hickman
- Bob Kelley
- Bill McColgan
- Steve Owen - Owen was the host of Pro Football Highlights on the DuMont Television Network from 1951-53.
- Van Patrick
- Bob Prince
- Bob Reynolds
- By Saam
- Chris Schenkel - In 1952, Schenkel was hired by the DuMont Television Network, for which he broadcast New York Giants football and hosted DuMont's Boxing From Eastern Parkway (1953-1954) and Boxing From St. Nicholas Arena (1954-1956).
- Ray Scott - His first NFL broadcasts came in 1953 over the DuMont network; three years later he began doing play-by-play on Packers broadcasts for CBS and it was in Green Bay that his terse, minimalist style (e.g. : "Starr . . . Dowler . . . Touchdown, Green Bay.") developed its greatest following.
- Chuck Thompson - Thompson's national television debut was in 1954 when he succeeded Ray Scott as the voice of the NFL's Saturday night Game of the Week on the DuMont Television Network, as well as that year's NFL Championship Game.
- Joe Tucker
- Don Wattrick
- Harry Wismer - In 1953, Wismer was involved in an early attempt to expand football into prime time network television, when ABC, now with a renewed interest in sports, broadcast an edited replay on Sunday nights of the previous day's Notre Dame games, which were cut down to 75 minutes in length by removing the time between plays, halftime, and even some of the more uneventful plays. (While this format was not successful in prime time, a similar presentation of Notre Dame football later became a staple of Sunday mornings for many years on CBS with Lindsey Nelson as the announcer.) Also that season was the first attempt at prime time coverage of pro football, with Wismer at the microphone on the old DuMont Network. Unlike ABC's Notre Dame coverage, DuMont's NFL game was presented live on Saturday nights, but interest was not adequate to save the DuMont Network, which had by this point already entered what would be a terminal decline (although it did mount a subsequent 1954 season of NFL telecasts, minus Wismer, which proved to be one of its last regular programs).

=== NFL Championship Game commentators ===
Season	Play-by-play	Color commentator(s)
1951	Harry Wismer	Earl Gillespie
1952	Harry Wismer	
1953	Harry Wismer	Red Grange
1954	By Saam (first half) and Chuck Thompson (second half)	

== Status of broadcasts today ==
Two episodes of the NFL's highlights package, Time for Football, from the 1954 season survive, featuring game action of Week 1 and Week 6. Time for Football was a co-production of DuMont and Tel Ra. The Week 6 episode presumably includes DuMont's own game footage from the Saturday night game between Philadelphia and Green Bay. No audio play-by-play or commentary survives from any DuMont telecast.

It is also possible that this video footage is DuMont coverage of the 1953 NFL Championship Game, though it is not confirmed and the tape contains no audio. That footage is available for viewing on YouTube. This game, and others aired by DuMont, were broadcast live and were probably not recorded except on kinescope for later viewing by the few DuMont affiliates and stations in the west or for highlight reels and game film.

Two five-second plugs from October 1954 promoting DuMont's NFL programming survive.
