= 1955 Cleveland Browns season =

NFL team season

- Head coach: Paul Brown
- Home stadium: Cleveland Stadium

Results
- Record: 9–2–1
- Division place: 1st Eastern
- Playoffs: Won NFL Championship (at Rams) 38–14
- All-Pros: Don Colo; Len Ford; Frank Gatski; Abe Gibron; Otto Graham; Lou Groza; Mike McCormack; Don Paul.
- Pro Bowlers: Walt Michaels, LB; Carlton Massey, DB; Pete Brewster, LE; Ken Konz, S Fred Morrison, RH; Don Colo, DT; Abe Gibron, G

The 1955 Cleveland Browns season was the team's sixth season with the National Football League. The Browns' defense became the first defense in the history of the NFL to lead the league in fewest points allowed and fewest total yards allowed for two consecutive seasons.

Quarterback Otto Graham was spurred on to come out of retirement and play one more year. The defending NFL champion Browns were 9–2–1 in the regular season and won the Eastern Conference while Graham won his fifth overall Most Valuable Player Award (two AAFC, three NFL). They played in the NFL Championship Game for the sixth consecutive year, and repeated as champion with a 38–14 win over the Rams in Los Angeles. Having played in the league championship game every year he played (ten), Graham retired for good after the game ended.

== Season summary ==
The 1955 season began in rough fashion for the Browns, with the defending world champions losing 27–17 at home in the opener to the Washington Redskins, who had their best season in a decade by finishing second in the Eastern Conference at 8–4. But once hall of fame quarterback Otto Graham got back on track, so did the Browns. With Graham, who had been lured out of retirement when the team experienced problems at that position in training camp, leading the way, the Browns then went on to win six in a row and nine of their last 11 to finish 9–2–1 and capture their sixth consecutive conference title. The Browns then blasted the host Los Angeles Rams 38–14 in the league title game, after which Graham retired again – this time for good, ending the club's remarkable first decade of existence in which it played in the league championship contest all 10 times and won seven crowns.

The Browns really caught fire offensively in the last five games. Including the title contest, they averaged 37.8 points per outing during that span, in which they won four times and played to a 35–35 tie with the New York Giants. Also, earlier in the year, they won the important road rematch with the Redskins, 24–14.

On the season, Graham threw for 15 touchdowns with just eight interceptions for a 94.0 quarterback rating, the second-best mark of his six-year NFL career. The Browns had three receivers with 29 or more catches, combining for 18 TDs. Pete Brewster was tops in receptions with 34, with Ray Renfro leading the way in scores with eight. Also, the Browns had something they hadn't had since their first year in the NFL—that is, a big-yardage running back. Fred "Curly" Morrison rushed for 824 yards, the most by a Brown since the team joined the league in 1950, when hall of famer Marion Motley had 810 yards.

== Roster ==
1955 Cleveland Browns roster
Quarterbacks: 14 Otto Graham; 16 George Ratterman; Running backs: 30 Maurice Bassett; 40 Dub Jones; 36 Ed Modzelewski; 32 Fred Morrison; 26 Ray Renfro S; 43 Bob Smith; Receivers: 88 Pete Brewster; 84 Horace Gillom P/DE; 86 Dante Lavelli	Offensive linemen: 60 Harold Bradley G; 62 Herschel Forester G; 52 Frank Gatski C; 64 Abe Gibron G; 76 Lou Groza T/K; 74 Mike McCormack T; 78 John Sandusky T/DT; Defensive linemen: 70 Don Colo DT; 80 Len Ford DE; 79 Bob Gain MG; 72 John Kissell DT; 82 Carlton Massey DE; 83 Chuck Weber DE/LB	Linebackers: 34 Walt Michaels LB; 65 Chuck Noll LB; 50 Sam Palumbo LB/C; 54 Pete Perini MG; Defensive backs: 42 Tommy James S; 22 Ken Konz S; 24 Warren Lahr CB; 20 Don Paul CB; 44 John Petitbon S	Reserve list: Tom Catlin LB (Military); Gene Filipski RB (Military); Chet Hanulak RB (Military); Art Hunter C/T (Military); John Macerelli T/G (IR); Babe Parilli QB (Military); Billy Reynolds RB (Military); rookies in italics

== Exhibition schedule ==
Week	Date	Opponent	Result	Attendance
1	August 12	vs. College All-Stars at Chicago	L 27–30	75,000
2	August 20	vs. Green Bay Packers at Akron	W 13–7	22,000
3	August 28	at San Francisco 49ers	L 14–17	41,604
4	September 2	at Los Angeles Rams	L 21–38	35,948
5	September 10	Detroit Lions	L 3–19	29,581
6	September 15	at Chicago Bears	L 21–24	43,067

== Regular season ==
=== Schedule ===
Week	Date	Opponent	Result	Record	Venue	Attendance	Recap
1	September 25	**Washington Redskins**	**L** 17–27	0–1	Cleveland Municipal Stadium	30,041	Recap
2	October 2	at San Francisco 49ers	**W** 38–3	1–1	Kezar Stadium	46,150	Recap
3	October 9	**Philadelphia Eagles**	**W** 21–17	2–1	Cleveland Municipal Stadium	43,974	Recap
4	October 16	at **Washington Redskins**	**W** 24–14	3–1	Griffith Stadium	29,168	Recap
5	October 23	Green Bay Packers	**W** 41–10	4–1	Cleveland Municipal Stadium	51,482	Recap
6	October 30	at **Chicago Cardinals**	**W** 26–20	5–1	Comiskey Park	29,471	Recap
7	November 6	**New York Giants**	**W** 24–14	6–1	Cleveland Municipal Stadium	46,524	Recap
8	November 13	at **Philadelphia Eagles**	**L** 17–33	6–2	Connie Mack Stadium	39,303	Recap
9	November 20	**Pittsburgh Steelers**	**W** 41–14	7–2	Cleveland Municipal Stadium	53,509	Recap
10	November 27	at **New York Giants**	**T** 35–35	7–2–1	Polo Grounds	45,699	Recap
11	December 4	at **Pittsburgh Steelers**	**W** 30–7	8–2–1	Forbes Field	31,101	Recap
12	December 11	**Chicago Cardinals**	**W** 35–24	9–2–1	Cleveland Municipal Stadium	25,914	Recap

Note: Intra-division opponents are in bold text.

=== Standings ===
NFL Eastern Conference
	W	L	T	PCT	CONF	PF	PA	STK
Cleveland Browns	9	2	1	.818	7–2–1	349	218	W2
Washington Redskins	8	4	0	.667	6–4	246	222	W1
New York Giants	6	5	1	.545	4–5–1	267	223	W2
Philadelphia Eagles	4	7	1	.364	4–5–1	248	231	L1
Chicago Cardinals	4	7	1	.364	3–6–1	224	252	L2
Pittsburgh Steelers	4	8	0	.333	4–6	195	285	L7

Note: Tie games were not officially counted in the standings until 1972.

== NFL Championship Game ==
Round	Date	Opponent	Result	Record	Venue	Attendance	Recap
Championship	December 26	at Los Angeles Rams	W 38–14	1–0	Los Angeles Memorial Coliseum	87,695	Recap

- Monday, 1 pm PST

== Awards and records ==
- Led NFL, Points Scored (349)
