= Jimmy Hill (American football) =

American football player (born 1928)

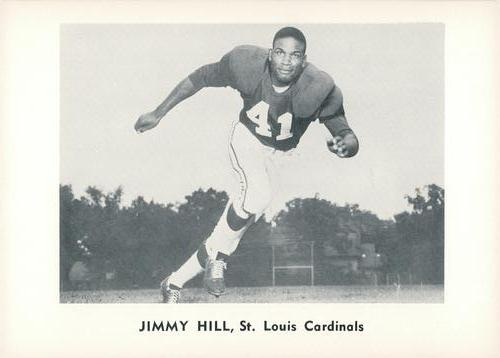
- Hill c. 1961

No. 41, 43, 12
- Position: Cornerback

Personal information
- Born: July 22, 1928; Dallas, Texas, U.S.
- Died: August 29, 2006 (aged 78)
- Listed height: 6 ft 2 in (1.88 m)
- Listed weight: 192 lb (87 kg)

Career information
- High school: Booker T. Washington (Dallas)
- College: Sam Houston State (1947–1950)
- NFL draft: 1955: undrafted

Career history
- Chicago / St. Louis Cardinals (1955–1964); Detroit Lions (1965); Kansas City Chiefs (1966)

Awards and highlights
- AFL champion (1966); Second-team All-Pro (1962); 3× Pro Bowl (1960–1962)

Career NFL/AFL statistics
- Interceptions: 20
- Interception yards: 320
- Fumble recoveries: 4
- Sacks: 2
- Defensive touchdowns: 3
- Stats at Pro Football Reference

James Hill Jr. (July 22, 1928 – August 29, 2006), nicknamed "Iron Claw", was an American professional football cornerback who played for the Chicago / St. Louis Cardinals and Detroit Lions of the National Football League (NFL). He ended his career with the Kansas City Chiefs of the American Football League (AFL). He was a three-time Pro Bowl cornerback. He did not have high interception totals during his career because quarterbacks avoided throwing to his side of the field. He had a three-season span of not giving up a single passing touchdown. In the early 1960s, he was considered among the best cornerbacks in the NFL.

== Early life ==
Hill was born on July 22, 1928, in Dallas, Texas. He attended Booker T. Washington High School, and played on its football team as an offensive end, where he was named to the All-Texas team in 1945 and 1946. He also excelled in track and field, setting school records in the low hurdles. He scored 30 touchdowns in high school. His time at Booker T. Washington overlapped with the younger Ernie Banks, a fellow Booker T. Washington student and future baseball Hall of Famer.

== College career ==
Hill attended Sam Houston State College (now Sam Houston State University) in Huntsville, Texas, excelling in football, track (as a sprinter), baseball (as a pitcher), and basketball. He was named the school's best all-around athlete in his last three years in college. Hill was twice an honorable mention All-American in football, and once scored five touchdowns in a single game. He had 134 pass receptions and scored 16 touchdowns in college. He was nicknamed “Iron Claw” in college because of his consistency in almost always catching the passes thrown to him.

After graduating from college, Hill became a schoolteacher and coach. In 1950, he received some interest from professional baseball teams, and was pursued to play professional football by the San Francisco 49ers of the NFL and the Montreal Alouettes in Canada.

== Professional career ==
=== Central States Football League ===
In 1953, Hill joined the St. Louis Knights of the newly formed Central States American Football League. The Knights had already played three games that season when Hill joined the team. Hill played right halfback on offense for the Knights. He scored four touchdowns in his first game with the Knights, and 11 touchdowns in his first five games. He led the league in scoring that year, and was selected to the All-League team. The Knights won the league championship in 1953.

In 1954, Hill unsuccessfully tried out for the Cleveland Browns in the National Football League (NFL), and then returned to the Knights in late August. Hill played for the Knights in 1954. In 1954, the team had not paid its players and ceased operations in October 1954 when the players refused to continue playing unpaid. At the time, the Knights' two-year record was 14–1–1.

=== Chicago/St. Louis Cardinals ===
Hill signed as a free agent with the NFL's Chicago Cardinals in 1955. He came into training camp viewed as an offensive back, after his success with the Knights. He was switched to defensive back in making the team as a 27-year-old rookie. During a preseason game against the Chicago Bears, he prevented Bears' second-year star receiver Harlon Hill from catching a pass; and after that the Cardinals used Jimmy Hill solely on defense. As a rookie in 1954, Harlon Hill had been selected to play in the Pro Bowl and was a second-team All-Pro, and in 1955 and 1956 he was selected first-team All-Pro and to the Pro Bowl.

Hill appeared in nine games during the 1955 season. Although he did not start, Hill had three fumble recoveries. Hill suffered a knee injury during the season which caused him to miss some games. In the third game of the season against the Washington Redskins, Hill broke up two Eddie LeBaron passes and played well at defensive back, described at the time as being "all over the field". After Johnny Carson caught a pass from LeBaron, Hill's tackle of Carson forced a fumble the Cardinals' recovered; and which eventually led to a touchdown.

The Cardinals finished the season 4–7–1. The Cardinals believed Hill played a role in reducing the number of touchdown passes thrown against the Cardinals from 29 in 1954, to just 16 in 1955; and reducing the pass completion percentage against the Cardinals from 54.2 per cent to 41.5 per cent over the same time period.

In 1956, Hill became the Cardinals' starting free safety. He started all 12 games and had five interceptions that season. He was one of the fastest players in the NFL, and one of three players on the Cardinals who ran the 100-yard dash in 9.5 seconds. Hill played in a defensive backfield that included future Pro Football Hall of Fame cornerback Dick "Night Train" Lane, pro bowl cornerback Lindon Crow, and strong safety Woodley Lewis. The Cardinals led the NFL in interceptions. Crow led the NFL with 11 interceptions, Lane was tied for fifth most with seven, and Hill's five was tied for 13th. As a team, the Cardinals were 7–5, and gave up the fourth fewest passing yards in the NFL.

In 1957, the Cardinals had Crow and Hill switch positions, with Hill now at right defensive halfback and Crow at free safety. Hill started 10 games, with three interceptions on the season. The Cardinals record fell to 3–9. Hill missed the entire 1958 season because of an arm injury. He returned in 1959, starting 12 games at right cornerback, with two interceptions.

In 1960, the Cardinals moved from Chicago to St. Louis. Hill started 11 games at right cornerback, without an interception that season. Still, he was selected to play in the Pro Bowl for the first time. Similarly, he had four interceptions in 1961 and two in 1962 (along with a fumble recovery), but was selected to the Pro Bowl both years. Hill also had two quarterback sacks in 1962. Throughout his career, Hill was not an interception leader, as opposing teams did not throw the ball to his side of the field often because of the high level of his defensive skills. The Newspaper Enterprise Association named Hill a first-team All-Pro in 1961 and second-team All-Pro in 1962. The Associated Press also named him second-team All-Pro in 1962.

In an October 1, 1961, game against the 1960 NFL champion Philadelphia Eagles, Hill intercepted a pass thrown by future Hall of Fame quarterback Sonny Jurgensen, with less than two minutes remaining in the game. This led to the Cardinals' game winning field goal with five seconds remaining in the game. In an October 22 game that season, he ran back an interception 35 yards for a touchdown. In a 1962 game against the Pittsburgh Steelers, Hall of Fame quarterback Bobby Layne did not throw a single pass toward Hill's part of the field.

In 1960, the Cardinals defensive backfield included Hill at right cornerback, Billy Stacy at left cornerback, future Hall of Fame free safety Larry Wilson, and Jerry Norton at strong safety. The group continued together in 1961, with Willie West starting some games at left cornerback. In 1962, Norm Beal and Bill Triplett replaced Norton. Hill was an ideal corner threat for the Cardinals during that time, as a Pro Bowl shut-down corner. In 1963, future Pro Bowl players Pat Fischer became the starter at left cornerback and rookie Jerry Stovall started at strong safety; playing alongside Hill and Wilson. The Cardinals had a 9–5 record that season. The Cardinals were fourth in the NFL (out of 14 teams) in fewest passing yards allowed on defense that season.

Hill's career was overshadowed to some degree by one play during an October 20, 1963 game against the Green Bay Packers involving Packers' quarterback Bart Starr, that resulted in Starr suffering a broken hand and Hill losing two teeth. While the two players did not hold a grudge against each other, and Hill offered an apology that Starr accepted, a Sports Illustrated article a few weeks later described Hill's conduct as the most reprehensible of the season. After that, Hill suffered fan vilification across the NFL, even from his hometown St. Louis fans.

In 1964, the Cardinals were 9–3–2. Hill started eight games, without an interception. His play was hampered by injuries and serious knee swelling. Rookie Jimmy Burson replaced the 36-year old Hill during the season. Hill was not expected to come back and play in1965. He did, however, return to the NFL in 1965. He was waived by the Cardinals and acquired by the Detroit Lions in July 1965. After appearing in only four games, with one start and one interception, the Lions waived Hill in early November.

In early October 1966, Hill worked out for the American Football League's (AFL) Kansas City Chiefs, after cornerback Fred Williamson suffered a shoulder injury. Coach Hank Stram signed Hill, believing he could help the Chiefs. Hill appeared in three games for the Chiefs that season. The Chiefs won the AFL championship, and lost in Super Bowl I to the Green Bay Packers, but Hill did not appear in any of the Chiefs' postseason games.

=== Bart Starr incident ===
The Cardinals played the Green Bay Packers on October 20, 1963. During the game, Packers' quarterback Bart Starr was running with the ball after he was unable to find a pass receiver. Hill made a hard tackle or hard hit on Starr near the sideline. Starr said he was running out of bounds. Hill stated that when the two were on the ground after that, Starr kicked him in the face, resulting in Hill ultimately losing two teeth. Hill said he then acted instinctively, punching Starr in the face or hitting Starr in the face with the back of his hand. Hill was then ejected from the game. Hill made clear after the game that he did not believe Starr intended to injure him, and he apologized to Starr for punching Starr. Starr wrote in his thrice-weekly newspaper column about Hill's apology to him, "I think that was a fine thing to do", and did not hold a grudge against Hill. The right-handed Starr suffered a broken right hand during the tackle and fall, and missed four starts.

Three weeks later, Sports Illustrated published a story by journalist Walter Bingham about rough play in pro football, and the incident between Hill and Starr was used as a prime example. Among other things, the article stated "Bart Starr ... was attacked on the field by Jimmy Hill. ... Attacked is the word, too, not tackled. Starr was running with the ball when the two met near the sideline. As they collided, Hill's right forearm shot forward. Starr ducked and the blow glanced off his helmet. As both men fell, Hill jabbed back at Starr with his right elbow, but Starr was out of range. Hill scrambled to his knees and, as Starr rolled over on his back and started to sit up, Hill punched him in the face. Starr fell back again." The caption to a photograph in the article stated "In the most reprehensible play of the season. Cardinal Defensive Back Jimmy Hill slugs Green Bay Packer Quarterback Bart Starr in the face, an example of professional football at its worst."

The Sports Illustrated story itself became a subject of scrutiny and media coverage. The St. Louis press objected to the portrayal of Hill as a villain who had violently attacked Starr without provocation. It was pointed out the initial tackle was harsh, but not illegal; and the Sports Illustrated piece did not mention Starr's having kicked Hill (accidentally) in the mouth. Hill ironically was shown the article for the first time by his dentist when Hill came in to have his infected teeth extracted.

After the article, Hill was booed by fans around the NFL, including his hometown fans in St. Louis, which dispirited him. Hill eventually requested that he not be introduced before games because of the fans booing. As to the boos from his hometown fans, Hill said "Those really hurt me ... I thought all the fans in St. Louis were my friends. Hill later brought a libel suit against the publisher and distributor of the article and artist's illustration accompanying it, on the basis it falsely portrayed Hill as a dirty player. The suit settled out of court four years later.

== Legacy ==
Hill was known for his speed and hard hitting as a cornerback. He also put in considerable time in studying opposing receivers, quarterbacks, and defensive backs. He was known among his teammates for his ability to anticipate the plays opposing quarterbacks were about to call (with only Hall of Fame quarterback Johnny Unitas able to befuddle him by not falling into a predictable pattern, and being skilled at faking passing direction). During his peak years, offenses did not throw the ball often to receivers on Hill's side of the field. Because of his detailed study of receivers, he also was able to offer guidance to young receivers and defensive backs on the Cardinals, including receiver Sonny Randle and future Hall of Fame safety Larry Wilson, who acknowledged Hill's helpfulness to him as a rookie (and also observed Hill's "uncanny ability" to diagnose plays before they occurred). Cardinals quarterbacks also came to Hill for advice on the tendencies of other teams' defensive backs.

Hill did not allow a touchdown pass from 1960 to 1962. He had a period of eight consecutive games where no pass was thrown to his side. In 2019, Hill was cited by The Arizona Republic as the 98th best player in Cardinals history. In a November 4, 1962 game against the New York Giants, Hill held the five-time first-team All-Pro wide receiver Del Shofner to one pass reception. After the game, Shofner told the media "That Jim Hill ... is inhuman". Hill's backfield coach Ray Willsey called Hill one of the best cornerbacks in the NFL, and unquestionably the best in the eastern conference. In a poll among New York sportswriters in the early 1960s, they concluded Hill was the NFL's best cornerback, above Night Trian Lane and Erich Barnes.

In what was acceptable play at the time, he was known for using a hard forearm blow against opposing runners and receivers, known as "the bone" in that era. Hall of Fame quarterback Bobby Layne listed Hill among the 11 most consistently tough (meanest and most vicious, but not dirtiest) players of his era, alongside Hall of Fame players Gino Marchetti (the toughest), Joe Schmidt, Sam Huff, Bill George, Night Train Lane, Alex Karras, John Henry Johnson, Jim Taylor, and Mike Ditka. The only player on Layne's list not in the Pro Football Hall of Fame, besides Hill, was Red Mack.

Hill was also known for being unusually courteous and appreciative towards others generally, among professional athletes. It was also said that despite his astute football mind he was unable to obtain a coaching position because he did not take "any guff" from others.

== Personal life and death ==
After retirement, Hill stayed in St. Louis while operating music stores and various bars and restaurants in the area and served as a part-time scout for the Chiefs. He also was a radio announcer and had a weekly sports column. Hill died at the age of 78 on August 29, 2006.

== See also ==
- List of American Football League players
