= List of NFL Championship Game broadcasters =

The following is a list of the television networks and announcers that broadcast the National Football League Championship Game from the 1940s until the 1969 NFL season (after which the NFL merged with the American Football League). The National Football League first held a championship game in 1933, it took until 1948 before a championship game would be televised. The successor to the NFL Championship Game is the NFC Championship Game.

== Television ==
Season	Teams	Network	Play-by-play	Color commentator(s)	Sideline reporter(s)
1948	Chicago Cardinals at Philadelphia	ABC	Harry Wismer		
1949	Philadelphia at Los Angeles	No Network Telecast (game was played in Los Angeles, and at the time, there was no way to send live TV programs from the West Coast to the East Coast and vice versa)			
1950	Los Angeles at Cleveland	ABC	Red Grange	Joe Hasel	
1951	Cleveland at Los Angeles	DuMont (first NFL Championship Game to be televised live from coast-to-coast)	Red Grange	Earl Gillespie	
1952	Detroit at Cleveland	DuMont	Harry Wismer		
1953	Cleveland at Detroit	DuMont	Chris Schenkel, Ken Coleman		
1954	Detroit at Cleveland	DuMont	Chris Schenkel, Ken Coleman		
1955	Cleveland at Los Angeles	NBC	Bob Kelley, Ken Coleman	Bob Graham	
1956	Chicago Bears at New York	NBC	Chris Schenkel, Jack Brickhouse	Red Grange	
1957	Cleveland at Detroit	NBC	Van Patrick, Ken Coleman	Red Grange	
1958	Baltimore at New York	NBC	Chris Schenkel, Chuck Thompson		
1959	New York at Baltimore	NBC	Chuck Thompson, Chris Schenkel		
1960	Green Bay at Philadelphia	NBC	Lindsey Nelson (first half) and Ray Scott (second half)		
1961	New York Giants at Green Bay	NBC	Lindsey Nelson (first half) and Chris Schenkel (second half)		
1962	Green Bay at New York Giants	NBC	Chris Schenkel (first half) and Ray Scott (second half)		
1963	New York Giants at Chicago	NBC	Jack Brickhouse (first half) and Chris Schenkel (second half)	George Connor	
1964	Baltimore at Cleveland	CBS	Ken Coleman (first half) and Chuck Thompson (second half)	Frank Gifford	
1965	Cleveland at Green Bay	CBS (first NFL Championship Game to be televised in color)	Ray Scott (first half) and Ken Coleman (second half)	Frank Gifford	
1966	Green Bay at Dallas	CBS	Jack Buck (first half) and Ray Scott (second half)	Frank Gifford	Pat Summerall
1967	Dallas at Green Bay	CBS	Ray Scott (first half) and Jack Buck (second half)	Frank Gifford	Tom Brookshier
1968	Baltimore at Cleveland	CBS	Jack Buck	Pat Summerall	Tom Brookshier
1969	Cleveland at Minnesota	CBS	Ray Scott	Paul Christman	Bruce Roberts

=== Notes ===
- The 1969 NFL Championship Game was the final broadcasting assignment for Paul Christman, who died less than two months later on March 2.
- The 1967 NFL Championship Game was televised by CBS, with play by play being done by Ray Scott for the first half and Jack Buck for the second half, while Frank Gifford handled the color commentary for the entire game. Pat Summerall and Tom Brookshier served as sideline reporters. Gifford and Summerall were intimately aware of the personality differences that existed between Landry and Lombardi because they had both played on the New York Giants during Landry's and Lombardi's tenure at the Giants. Over 30 million people would tune in to watch the game. No copy of the complete telecast is known to exist. Some excerpts (such as the announcers' pre-game comments on the field) were saved and are occasionally re-aired in retrospective features. The Cowboys' radio broadcast on KLIF, with Bill Mercer announcing, and the Packers' radio broadcast on WTMJ, with Ted Moore announcing, still exist.
- The 1964 NFL Championship Game also the last NFL Championship Game televised in black-and-white, as well as the last game in which penalty flags in NFL games were white. The league switched to bright yellow flags the next season. The gate receipts for the game were about $635,000 and the television money was $1.9 million. Each player on the winning Cleveland Browns team received about $8,000, while Baltimore Colts players made around $5,000 each. This was about triple the amount for the players' shares in the AFL championship game.
- NBC paid the league $926,000 for the broadcast rights for the 1963 NFL Championship Game. The gate receipts for the game were about $500,000 and the television money was $926,000. For the first time, the NFL tried a closed-circuit telecast in the local blackout area, with 26,000 viewing on large screens in four locations: McCormick Place, International Amphitheatre, Chicago Coliseum, and Chicago Stadium; tickets ranged from $4 to $7.50. Gross receipts were $1,493,954, with $35,402 from the closed-circuit telecast.
- Due to the NFL's blackout policy which aimed to protect gate receipts, until 1973, fans in a team's home market could not watch their team's regular season and playoff games on television, even if they were title games as was also the case in 1962. New York fans made reservations for motels in Pennsylvania, New Jersey, and Connecticut so they could watch the game out of the 75-mile (120 km) blackout zone, and even though the game was played in 17 °F (−8 °C) temperatures with 35–40 mph (56–64 km/h) winds, only 299 of the 65,000+ Giant fans who bought tickets to the sold out game stayed home.
- The 1961 NFL Championship Game was touted as "The Million Dollar Game," owing to the $600,000 in television broadcast rights paid to the NFL by NBC combined with a $400,000 gate to be generated through a projected sale of 40,000 tickets at the unitary price of $10 per seat regardless of location in the stadium. With 40,000 tickets sold at $10 each and $615,000 in TV revenue, this game was the first NFL Championship to generate $1 million in revenue. Each player on the winning Green Bay Packers team received $5,195, while New York Giants players made $3,340 each.
- During overtime of the 1958 NFL Championship Game, when the Baltimore Colts were on the eight-yard line of the New York Giants, someone ran out onto the field of Yankee Stadium, causing the game to be delayed; rumors have stated that it was an NBC employee who was ordered to create a distraction because the national television feed had gone dead. The difficulty was the result of an unplugged TV signal cable, and the delay in the game bought NBC enough time to fix the problem before the next play.
  - An estimated 45 million people watched the game on television in the United States. This audience could have been even greater except that because of NFL restrictions, the game was blacked out in the greater New York City area. Still, the impact from this game is far reaching. A year later, Texas billionaire Lamar Hunt formed the American Football League, which began play with eight teams in the 1960 season. The growth of the popularity of the sport, through franchise expansion, the eventual merger with the AFL, and popularity on television, is commonly credited to this game, making it a turning point in the history of football. NFL Commissioner Pete Rozelle was said by Giants owner Wellington Mara to have attributed professional football's surge in popularity to the game, because it "happened just at that time, in that season, and it happened in New York".
- The 1951 NFL Championship Game the first NFL championship game to be televised coast-to-coast, and was blacked out by the league in the southern California area. The DuMont Network purchased the championship game TV rights from the NFL in May for five years (1951–55) for $475,000. The gross receipts for the game, including $75,000 for radio and television rights, was just under $326,000, the highest to date, passing the previous record of $283,000 five years earlier in 1946. Each player on the winning Los Angeles Rams team received $2,108, while Cleveland Browns players made $1,483 each.
- The 1949 NFL Championship Game was only televised on the West Coast, under the auspices of NFL Commissioner Bert Bell.

== Radio ==
=== 1960s ===
Season	Teams	Network	Play-by-play	Color commentator(s)
1964	Baltimore at Cleveland	CBS	Jack Drees	Jim Morse
1965	Cleveland at Green Bay	CBS	Jack Drees	Jim Morse
1966	Green Bay at Dallas	CBS	Jack Drees	Jim Morse
1967	Dallas at Green Bay	CBS	Jack Drees	Jim Morse

=== Local radio ===
==== 1960s ====
Season	Teams	Network	Play-by-play	Color commentator(s)
1964	Baltimore at Cleveland	WCBM-AM (Baltimore)	Frank Messer	John Steadman
1964	Baltimore at Cleveland	WERE-AM (Cleveland)	Gib Shanley	Jim Graner
1965	Cleveland at Green Bay	WERE-AM (Cleveland)	Gib Shanley	Jim Graner
1965	Cleveland at Green Bay	WTMJ-AM (Green Bay)	Ted Moore	Blaine Walsh
1966	Green Bay at Dallas	WTMJ-AM (Green Bay)	Ted Moore	Blaine Walsh
1966	Green Bay at Dallas	KLIF-AM (Dallas)	Bill Mercer	Blackie Sherrod
1967	Dallas at Green Bay	KLIF-AM (Dallas)	Bill Mercer	Blackie Sherrod
1967	Dallas at Green Bay	WTMJ-AM (Green Bay)	Ted Moore	Chuck Johnson

== See also ==
- List of Super Bowl broadcasters
- List of AFL Championship Game broadcasters
