= Pete Brewster =

American football player and coach (1930–2020)

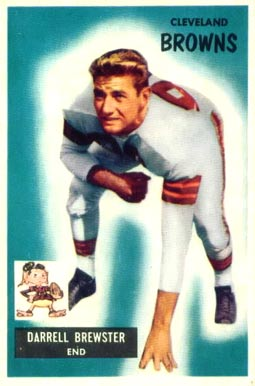
- Brewster on a 1955 Bowman football card

No. 83, 82, 88
- Position: End

Personal information
- Born: September 1, 1930; Portland, Indiana, U.S.
- Died: January 3, 2020 (aged 89); Belton, Missouri, U.S.
- Listed height: 6 ft 3 in (1.91 m)
- Listed weight: 210 lb (95 kg)

Career information
- College: Purdue (1948–1951)
- NFL draft: 1952: 2nd round, 21st overall pick

Career history
- Cleveland Browns (1952–1958); Pittsburgh Steelers (1959–1960)

Awards and highlights
- 2× NFL champion (1954, 1955); Super Bowl champion (IV); Second-team All-Pro (1957); 2× Pro Bowl (1955, 1956); Cleveland Browns Legends

Career NFL statistics
- Receptions: 210
- Receiving yards: 3,758
- Receiving touchdowns: 21
- Stats at Pro Football Reference

Darrel Burton Brewster (September 1, 1930 – January 3, 2020), known as Pete Brewster, was an American professional football player who was an end in the National Football League (NFL), primarily with the Cleveland Browns. He played both college football and basketball for the Purdue Boilermakers. He was a two-time Pro Bowl selection with Cleveland, and also played in the NFL for the Pittsburgh Steelers. After his playing career, he became a coach.

== College career ==
Brewster played football and basketball at Portland High School, located in Portland, Indiana. After high school, he went to Purdue University, located in West Lafayette, Indiana, on a basketball scholarship, playing for Ray Eddy. He also played varsity football as a Boilermaker for head coach Stuart Holcomb. .

== Professional career ==
Brewster was selected in the 2nd round (21st overall) in the 1952 NFL draft. In his first season with the Cleveland Browns, he filled in on both defense and offense. He became the team's first-string offensive left end during his second season and was the team's second-ranking pass receiver during the 1953 season. He was selected for Pro Bowl honors in 1955 and 1956 at the tight end position. After seven seasons with the Browns, he played for the Pittsburgh Steelers for two seasons.

== NFL career statistics ==
Legend
	Won the NFL championship
	Led the league
**Bold**	Career high

=== Regular season ===
Year	Team	Games		Receiving				
Year	Team	GP	GS	Rec	Yds	Avg	Lng	TD
1952	CLE	12	7	4	117	**29.3**	47	1
1953	CLE	12	12	32	632	19.8	45	4
1954	CLE	12	12	**42**	**676**	16.1	**57**	4
1955	CLE	12	12	34	622	18.3	41	**6**
1956	CLE	12	12	28	417	14.9	41	1
1957	CLE	12	12	30	614	20.5	56	2
1958	CLE	11	11	16	294	18.4	38	1
1959	PIT	9	7	22	360	16.4	42	2
1960	PIT	12	1	2	26	13.0	18	0
Career		104	86	210	3,758	17.9	57	21

=== Playoffs ===
Year	Team	Games		Receiving				
Year	Team	GP	GS	Rec	Yds	Avg	Lng	TD
1952	CLE	1	1	2	53	**26.5**	32	0
1953	CLE	1	1	0	0	0.0	0	0
1954	CLE	1	1	2	53	**26.5**	**45**	**1**
1955	CLE	1	1	1	9	9.0	9	0
1957	CLE	1	1	**3**	52	17.3	19	0
1958	CLE	1	1	**3**	**56**	18.7	29	0
Career		6	6	11	223	20.3	45	1

== Coaching career ==
Following the completion of his playing career, Brewster was a receivers coach with the Kansas City Chiefs and the Minnesota Vikings, earning a Super Bowl ring with the Chiefs in Super Bowl IV.

== After football ==
Brewster retired from football and lived in Peculiar, Missouri on the outskirts of Kansas City. He is enshrined in the Indiana Football Hall of Fame. He died in Belton, Missouri on January 3, 2020, at the age of 89.
