= 1955 Washington Redskins season =

NFL team season

- Owner: George Preston Marshall
- General manager: Dick McCann
- Head coach: Joe Kuharich
- Home stadium: Griffith Stadium

Results
- Record: 8–4
- Division place: 2nd NFL Eastern
- Playoffs: Did not qualify

The 1955 Washington Redskins season was the franchise's 24th season in the National Football League (NFL) and their 19th in Washington, D.C. The team improved on their 3–9 record from 1954 and finished 8–4. This was the Redskins' last winning season until 1969.

The Redskins continued their ongoing strategy of establishing themselves as the dominant NFL franchise of the Southern United States, broadcasting their games to a network of 19 television stations across Virginia, Maryland, the Carolinas, Georgia, and Florida.

From the 1955 season until 1962, the Redskins were the last bastion of racial segregation in the NFL by refusing to include a black player on their roster, unlike the other 11 teams in the league.

== Offseason ==
=== NFL draft ===
1954 Washington Redskins draft
| Round | Selection | Player | Position | College |
|---|---|---|---|---|
| 1 | 8 | Steve Meilinger | E | Kentucky |

== Preseason ==
| Week | Date | Opponent | Result | Record | Venue | Attendance |
|---|---|---|---|---|---|---|
| 1 | August 7 | at San Francisco 49ers | L 6–7 | 0–1–0 | Kezar Stadium | 27,237 |
| 2 | August 17 | at Los Angeles Rams | W 31–28 | 1–1–0 | Los Angeles Memorial Coliseum | 77,935 |
| 3 | August 24 | vs. Detroit Lions | L 14–17 | 1–2–0 | Ladd Memorial Stadium (Mobile, AL) | 23,000 |
| 4 | August 30 | at Baltimore Colts | T 28–28 | 1–2–1 | Baltimore Memorial Stadium | 23,280 |
| 5 | September 3 | vs. Chicago Bears | L 10–45 | 1–3–1 | Crump Stadium (Memphis, TN) | 10,704 |
| 6 | September 10 | vs. Green Bay Packers | W 33–31 | 2–3–1 | Bowman Gray Stadium (Winston-Salem, NC) | 13,000 |

== Regular season ==
=== Schedule ===
| Game | Date | Opponent | Result | Record | Venue | Attendance | Recap | Sources |
|---|---|---|---|---|---|---|---|---|
| 1 | September 25 | at **Cleveland Browns** | **W** 27–17 | 1–0 | Cleveland Municipal Stadium | 30,041 | Recap | |
| 2 | October 1 | at **Philadelphia Eagles** | **W** 31–30 | 2–0 | Connie Mack Stadium | 31,891 | Recap | |
| 3 | October 9 | **Chicago Cardinals** | **L** 10–24 | 2–1 | Griffith Stadium | 26,337 | Recap | |
| 4 | October 16 | **Cleveland Browns** | **L** 14–24 | 2–2 | Griffith Stadium | 29,168 | Recap | |
| 5 | October 23 | at Baltimore Colts | **W** 14–13 | 3–2 | Memorial Stadium | 51,387 | Recap | |
| 6 | October 30 | at **New York Giants** | **L** 7–35 | 3–3 | Polo Grounds | 17,402 | Recap | |
| 7 | November 6 | **Philadelphia Eagles** | **W** 34–21 | 4–3 | Griffith Stadium | 25,741 | Recap | |
| 8 | November 13 | San Francisco 49ers | **W** 7–0 | 5–3 | Griffith Stadium | 25,112 | Recap | |
| 9 | November 20 | at **Chicago Cardinals** | **W** 31–0 | 6-3 | Comiskey Park | 16,901 | Recap | |
| 10 | November 27 | at **Pittsburgh Steelers** | **W** 23–14 | 7-3 | Forbes Field | 21,760 | Recap | |
| 11 | December 4 | **New York Giants** | **L** 20–27 | 7-4 | Griffith Stadium | 28,556 | Recap | |
| 12 | December 11 | **Pittsburgh Steelers** | **W** 28–17 | 8-4 | Griffith Stadium | 20,547 | Recap | |
Note: Intra-conference opponents are in **bold** text.

=== Standings ===
NFL Eastern Conference
| | W | L | T | PCT | CONF | PF | PA | STK |
|---|---|---|---|---|---|---|---|---|
| Cleveland Browns | 9 | 2 | 1 | .818 | 7–2–1 | 349 | 218 | W2 |
| Washington Redskins | 8 | 4 | 0 | .667 | 6–4 | 246 | 222 | W1 |
| New York Giants | 6 | 5 | 1 | .545 | 4–5–1 | 267 | 223 | W2 |
| Philadelphia Eagles | 4 | 7 | 1 | .364 | 4–5–1 | 248 | 231 | L1 |
| Chicago Cardinals | 4 | 7 | 1 | .364 | 3–6–1 | 224 | 252 | L2 |
| Pittsburgh Steelers | 4 | 8 | 0 | .333 | 4–6 | 195 | 285 | L7 |

Note: Tie games were not officially counted in the standings until 1972.

== Personnel ==
=== Roster ===
1955 Washington Redskins roster
| Quarterbacks (QB): 16 Al Dorow RB; 3 Ralph Guglielmi; 14 Eddie LeBaron P; Running backs (RB): 46 Dale Atkeson; 32 Leo Elter; 43 Vic Janowicz K; 49 Jim Monachino; 29 Bert Zagers; Wide receivers (WR): 82 Johnny Carson; 83 Charley Jones; 87 Ralph Thomas; Tight ends (TE) | Offensive linemen (OL): 52 Johnny Allen C; 60 Marv Berschet G; 62 Don Boll T; 73 Mike Davlin T/DE; 65 Walt Houston G; 70 Fred Miller T/G; 67 Red Stephens G; 50 Harry Ulinski C; Defensive linemen (DL): 80 Gene Brito DE; 76 J. D. Kimmel DT; 64 Ron Marciniak DE/G; 88 Chet Ostrowski DE; 79 Volney Peters DT | Linebackers (LB): 36 Chuck Drazenovich MLB/FB; 45 Ralph Felton OLB; 53 LaVern Torgeson OLB/C; Defensive backs (DB): 42 Dick Alban CB; 25 Nick Adduci CB; 21 Roy Barni CB/S; 48 Norb Hecker S/RB; 20 Hal Norris S/OLB; 28 Joe Scudero S/RB; Special teams (ST) | Reserve: -- Sam Baker RB/P (Military); -- Tom Braatz LB (Military); -- Art DeCarlo CB (Military); -- Leon Heath RB (Military); -- Harry Jagielski T (Military); -- Steve Meilinger WR (Military); 66 Jim Norman T/G (IR); -- Bob Ready DT (Military); 51 Jim Schrader C/T (Military); -- Billy Wells RB (Military); Rookies in italics |
