= Herschel Forester =

American football player (1931–2018)

No. 62
- Position: Offensive Guard

Personal information
- Born: April 14, 1931; Dallas, Texas, U.S.
- Died: December 31, 2018 (aged 87); Dallas, Texas, U.S.
- Listed height: 6 ft 0 in (1.83 m)
- Listed weight: 230 lb (104 kg)

Career information
- High school: Woodrow Wilson
- College: SMU
- NFL draft: 1952: 8th round, 96th overall pick

Career history
- Cleveland Browns (1954–1957)

Awards and highlights
- 2× NFL Champion (1954, 1955); First-team All-SWC (1951); Second-team All-SWC (1950)

Career NFL statistics
- Games played: 48
- Games started: 0
- Fumble recoveries: 1
- Stats at Pro Football Reference

Herschel Vincent Forester (April 14, 1931 – December 31, 2018) was a professional American football offensive lineman in the National Football League (NFL). He played four seasons for the Cleveland Browns (1954–1957).
