= Ray Renfro =

American football player (1929–1997)

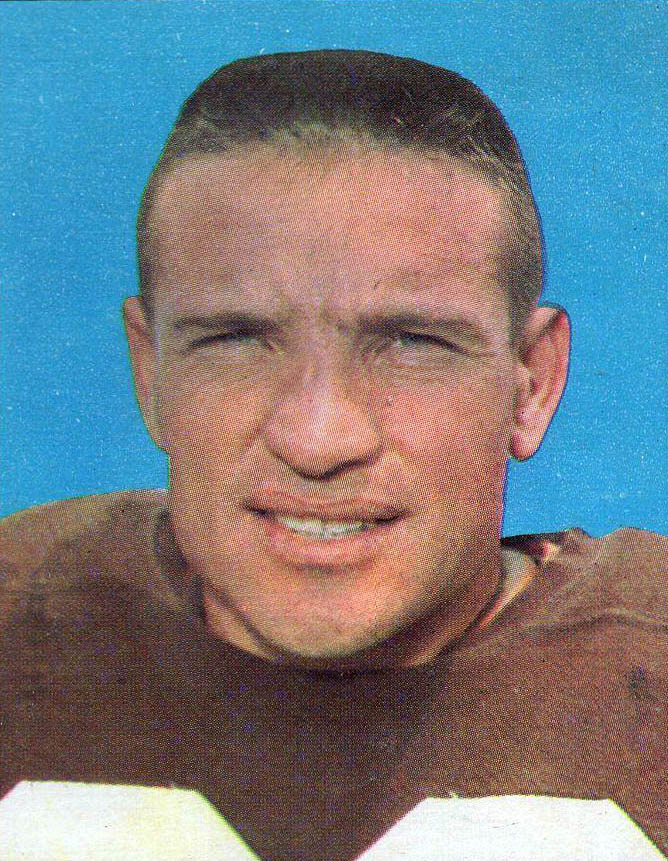
- Renfro with the Browns in 1961

No. 26
- Positions: Flanker, halfback

Personal information
- Born: November 7, 1929; Whitesboro, Texas, U.S.
- Died: August 4, 1997 (aged 67); Fort Worth, Texas, U.S.
- Listed height: 6 ft 1 in (1.85 m)
- Listed weight: 190 lb (86 kg)

Career information
- High school: Leonard (Leonard, Texas)
- College: North Texas State (1949–1951)
- NFL draft: 1952: 4th round, 48th overall pick

Career history

Playing
- Cleveland Browns (1952–1963)

Coaching
- Detroit Lions (1965) Running backs coach; Washington Redskins (1966–1967) Wide receivers coach; Dallas Cowboys (1968–1972) Quarterbacks & wide receivers coach

Awards and highlights
- As a player: 2× NFL champion (1954, 1955); Second-team All-Pro (1955); 3× Pro Bowl (1953, 1957, 1960); Cleveland Browns Legends; North Texas Mean Green No. 33 retired; As a coach: Super Bowl champion (VI)

Career NFL statistics
- Receptions: 281
- Receiving yards: 5,508
- Receiving touchdowns: 50
- Rushing yards: 682
- Rushing average: 5
- Rushing touchdowns: 4
- Stats at Pro Football Reference

Austin Raymond "The Rabbit" Renfro (November 7, 1929 – August 4, 1997) was an American professional football flanker who played 12 seasons in the National Football League (NFL) from 1952 to 1963 for the Cleveland Browns. He also played as a halfback from 1952 to 1958. He played college football for the North Texas State Eagles.

== Coaching career ==
Renfro served as an NFL assistant coach in the 1960s and 1970s. He coached running backs for the Detroit Lions in 1965. He then coached wide receivers for the Washington Redskins (1966–1967) and the Dallas Cowboys (1968–1972). He helped win Super Bowl VI as the quarterbacks and wide receivers coach for the Cowboys.

== NFL career statistics ==
Legend
	Won the NFL championship
	Led the league
**Bold**	Career high

=== Regular season ===
Year	Team	Games		Receiving				
Year	Team	GP	GS	Rec	Yds	Avg	Lng	TD
1952	CLE	11	0	1	8	8.0	8	0
1953	CLE	12	0	39	722	18.5	**70**	4
1954	CLE	7	7	13	228	17.5	64	1
1955	CLE	12	12	29	603	20.8	61	**8**
1956	CLE	12	12	17	325	19.1	46	4
1957	CLE	12	12	21	589	**28.0**	65	6
1958	CLE	12	12	24	573	23.9	52	6
1959	CLE	12	11	30	528	17.6	**70**	6
1960	CLE	12	9	24	378	15.8	66	4
1961	CLE	**14**	**14**	**48**	**834**	17.4	57	6
1962	CLE	**14**	**14**	31	638	20.6	65	4
1963	CLE	12	0	4	82	20.5	39	1
Career		142	103	281	5,508	19.6	70	50

== Personal life ==
Renfro is the father of former NFL wide receiver Mike Renfro and brother of Dean Renfro.

== Death ==
Renfro died at the age of 67 and was interred at the Greenwood Memorial Park cemetery along with Lon Evans.
