= Carlton Massey =

American football player (1930–1989)

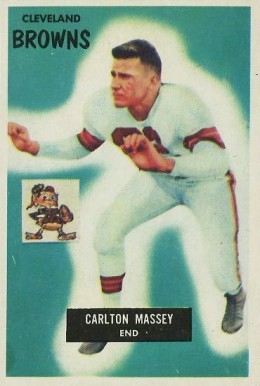
- Massey on a 1955 Bowman football card

No. 82, 81
- Positions: End, defensive end

Personal information
- Born: January 17, 1930; Rockwall, Texas, U.S.
- Died: May 22, 1989 (aged 59); Dilley, Texas, U.S.
- Listed height: 6 ft 4 in (1.93 m)
- Listed weight: 221 lb (100 kg)

Career information
- High school: Rockwall
- College: Southwestern (TX) (1949-1950); Texas (1951-1953)
- NFL draft: 1953: 8th round, 96th overall pick

Career history
- Cleveland Browns (1954–1956); Green Bay Packers (1957–1958)

Awards and highlights
- 2× NFL champion (1954, 1955); Pro Bowl (1955); Consensus All-American (1953); First-team All-SWC (1953)

Career NFL statistics
- Fumble recoveries: 3
- Interceptions: 1
- Stats at Pro Football Reference

Carlton Massey (January 17, 1930 – May 22, 1989) was an American professional football player who was a defensive lineman in the National Football League (NFL) for the Cleveland Browns (1954–1956) and Green Bay Packers (1957–1958). He attended Southwestern University and the University of Texas.

== College career ==
Though he played defensive end in the pros, he was a two-way starter at Texas who also led the team in receiving yards in 1953. He helped Texas win the Southwest Conference Championship and Cotton Bowl in 1952 and to finish ranked 10th in the nation. In the Cotton Bowl, he tackled Dave Griffith for a safety after Griffith attempted a fake punt on first down. In 1953, he was a consensus All-American and All-Conference player and led Texas, as team captain, to a share of the Conference Championship and a final ranking of #8.

== Professional career ==
He was selected by the Browns in the eighth round (95th overall) of the 1953 NFL draft. He participated in the 1955 Pro Bowl. He wore the number 82 with the Browns and the number 81 with the Packers. Massey played a total of 49 games in his five NFL seasons. He had one interception in his career that was returned 24 yards.

In 1975 he was admitted to the University of Texas Hall of Honor.
