= Walter Bingham =

Walter Bingham may refer to:

- Walter Bingham (sportswriter) (1930–2020), American sportswriter
- Walter Bingham (journalist) (born 1924), British-Israeli journalist, holocaust survivor, and Military Medal recipient
- Walter V. Bingham (1880–1952), American industrial and applied psychologist
