= 1957 All-Pro Team =

1957 National Football League team

The Associated Press (AP), Newspaper Enterprise Association (NEA), New York Daily News (NYDN), The Sporting News (SN), and United Press (UP) were among selectors of All-Pro teams comprising players adjudged to be the best at each position in the National Football League (NFL) during the 1957 NFL season. The AP, NEA, NYDN, and UPI selected a first and second team.

== Offensive selections ==
=== Quarterbacks ===
- Y. A. Tittle, San Francisco 49ers (AP)
- Johnny Unitas, Baltimore Colts (AP-2)

=== Halfbacks ===
- Frank Gifford, New York Giants (AP)
- Ollie Matson, Chicago Cardinals (AP)
- Hugh McElhenny, San Francisco 49ers (AP-2)
- Tommy Wilson, Los Angeles Rams (AP-2)

=== Fullbacks ===
- Jim Brown, Cleveland Browns (AP)
- Rick Casares, Chicago Bears (AP-2)

=== Ends ===
- Billy Wilson, San Francisco 49ers (AP)
- Billy Howton, Green Bay Packers (AP)
- Raymond Berry, Baltimore Colts (AP-2)
- Darrel Brewster, Cleveland Browns (AP-2)

=== Tackles ===
- Lou Creekmur, Detroit Lions (AP)
- Rosey Brown, New York Giants (AP)
- Lou Groza, Cleveland Browns (AP-2)
- Mike McCormack, Cleveland Browns (AP-2)

=== Guards ===
- Duane Putnam, Los Angeles Rams (AP)
- Dick Stanfel, Washington Redskins (AP)
- Harley Sewell, Detroit Lions (AP-2)
- Jack Stroud, New York Giants (AP-2)

=== Centers ===
- Jim Ringo, Green Bay Packers (AP)
- Larry Strickland, Chicago Bears (AP-2)

== Defensive selections ==
=== Defensive ends ===
- Gino Marchetti, Baltimore Colts (AP)
- Gene Brito, Washington Redskins (AP)
- Andy Robustelli, New York Giants (AP-2)
- Doug Atkins, Chicago Bears (AP-2)

=== Defensive tackles ===
- Leo Nomellini, San Francisco 49ers (AP)
- Art Donovan, Baltimore Colts (AP)
- Ernie Stautner, Pittsburgh Steelers (AP-2)
- Don Colo, Cleveland Browns (AP-2)

=== Middle guards ===
- Bill George, Chicago Bears (AP)
- Sam Huff, New York Giants (AP-2)

=== Linebackers ===
- Joe Schmidt, Detroit Lions (AP)
- Marv Matuszak, San Francisco 49ers (AP)
- Chuck Bednarik, Philadelphia Eagles (AP-2)
- Les Richter, Los Angeles Rams (AP-2)

=== Defensive backs ===
- Jack Christiansen, Detroit Lions (AP)
- Bobby Dillon, Green Bay Packers (AP)
- Jack Butler, Pittsburgh Steelers (AP)
- Milt Davis, Baltimore Colts (AP)
- Dicky Moegle, San Francisco 49ers (AP-2)
- Yale Lary, Detroit Lions (AP-2)
- Don Paul, Cleveland Browns (AP-2)
- Emlen Tunnell, New York Giants (AP-2)
