= 1955 Philadelphia Eagles season =

NFL team season

- Owner: Happy Hundred
- Head coach: Jim Trimble
- Home stadium: Connie Mack Stadium

Results
- Record: 4–7–1
- Division place: 4th (tied) NFL Eastern
- Playoffs: Did not qualify

The 1955 Philadelphia Eagles season was their 23rd in the league. They failed to improve on their previous output of 7–4–1, winning only four games. The team failed to qualify for the playoffs for the sixth consecutive season. 1955 marked the end of an era, as the last remaining Phil-Pitt Steagle, longtime player Bucko Kilroy, retired after 13 seasons in the NFL, all of them with the Eagles, going back to when they were known as the Steagles.

== Off season ==
=== NFL draft ===
The 1955 NFL draft was held on January 27–28, 1955. The draft lasted for 30 rounds, with 12 teams selecting 360 players. Because of a 7–4–1 record in the 1954 season, the Eagles picked 8th in the odd rounds and 9th in the even rounds, alternating with the San Francisco 49ers. The Eagles made a pick in every round.

The Eagles used their 1st round pick, 9th overall, to select Dick Bielski, a fullback from Maryland.

=== Player selections ===
The table shows the Eagles selections and what picks they had that were traded away and the team that ended up with that pick. It is possible the Eagles' pick ended up with this team via another team that the Eagles made a trade with. Not shown are acquired picks that the Eagles traded away.

= Pro Bowler	= Hall of Famer

Rd	Pick	Player	Position	School		Rd	Pick	Player	Position	School
1	9	Dick Bielski	Fullback	Maryland		2	22	Alex "Buck" Lansford	Tackle	Texas
3	33	Frank Eidom	Back	Southern Methodist		4	46	Dean Dugger	End	Ohio State
5	57	Gene Lamone	Guard	West Virginia		6	70	Billy Quinn	Back	Texas
7	81	Bill McKenna	End	Brandeis		8	94	Herman Watson	Tackle	Vanderbilt
9	105	Von Morgan	End	Abilene Christian		10	118	Talmadge "Duke" Washington	Back	Washington State
11	129	Bob Hardy	Back	Kentucky		12	142	Andy Nacrelli	End	Fordham
13	153	Jerry Krisher	Center	Ohio State		14	166	Tommy Bell	Back	Army
15	177	Don Brougher	Center	Maryland		16	190	Clyde White	Guard	Clemson
17					18					
19	225	Terry Fails	End	Vanderbilt	20					
21					22					
23					24	286	Vic "Hootie" Postula	Back	Michigan State	
25					26	310	George Palachunik	Guard	Maryland	
27					28					
29	345	Ron Lloyd	Tackle	Bucknell		30	357	Dave Finney	Back	Texas Christian

== Schedule ==
Week	Date	Opponent	Result	Record	Venue	Attendance	Recap	Sources
1	September 24	**New York Giants**	**W** 27–17	1–0	Connie Mack Stadium	29,597	Recap	
2	October 1	**Washington Redskins**	**L** 30–31	1–1	Connie Mack Stadium	31,891	Recap	
3	October 9	at **Cleveland Browns**	**L** 17–21	1–2	Cleveland Stadium	43,974	Recap	
4	October 15	at **Pittsburgh Steelers**	**L** 7–13	1–3	Forbes Field	33,413	Recap	
5	October 23	**Chicago Cardinals**	**T** 24–24	1–3–1	Connie Mack Stadium	24,620	Recap	
6	October 30	**Pittsburgh Steelers**	**W** 24–0	2–3–1	Connie Mack Stadium	31,164	Recap	
7	November 6	at **Washington Redskins**	**L** 21–34	2–4–1	Griffith Stadium	25,741	Recap	
8	November 13	**Cleveland Browns**	**W** 33–17	3–4–1	Connie Mack Stadium	39,303	Recap	
9	November 20	at **New York Giants**	**L** 7–31	3–5–1	Polo Grounds	22,075	Recap	
10	November 27	Los Angeles Rams	**L** 21–23	3–6–1	Connie Mack Stadium	21,668	Recap	
11	December 4	**Chicago Cardinals**	**W** 27–3	4–6–1	Connie Mack Stadium	19,478	Recap	
12	December 11	at Chicago Bears	**L** 10–17	4–7–1	Wrigley Field	34,783	Recap	
Note: Intra-conference opponents are in **bold** text.

=== Standings ===
NFL Eastern Conference
	W	L	T	PCT	CONF	PF	PA	STK
Cleveland Browns	9	2	1	.818	7–2–1	349	218	W2
Washington Redskins	8	4	0	.667	6–4	246	222	W1
New York Giants	6	5	1	.545	4–5–1	267	223	W2
Philadelphia Eagles	4	7	1	.364	4–5–1	248	231	L1
Chicago Cardinals	4	7	1	.364	3–6–1	224	252	L2
Pittsburgh Steelers	4	8	0	.333	4–6	195	285	L7

Note: Tie games were not officially counted in the standings until 1972.

== Roster ==
(All time List of Philadelphia Eagles players in franchise history)

= 1955 Pro Bowl	= Hall of Famer

- + = Was a Starter in the Pro-Bowl

1955 Philadelphia Eagles roster
NO.	Player	AGE	POS	GP	GS	WT	HT	YRS	College
	Jim Trimble	35	HEAD; COACH	_{1945 record} 4–7–1	_{NFL-Eagles; Lifetime} 25–20–3			4th	Indiana University
33	Roy Barni	28	DB	4	0	185	5–11	3	San Francisco
20	Bibbles Bawel	25	DB	12	0	185	6–1	3	Evansville
60	Chuck Bednarik	29	LB-C	12	0	233	6–3	5	Pennsylvania
81	Eddie Bell	24	DB-LB	12	0	212	6–1	Rookie	Pennsylvania
36	Dick Bielski	23	E-FB	12	0	224	6–1	Rookie	Maryland
10	Adrian Burk	27	QB	12	8	190	6–2	4	Baylor
64	Russ Carroccio	24	G-T-DT-DG	7	0	235	6–1	1	Virginia
44	Harry Dowda	33	DB-HB	12	0	195	6–2	6	Wake Forest
27	Hal Giancanelli	26	HB	12	0	182	5–10	2	Loyola Marymount
22	Ralph Goldston	26	HB-DB	10	0	195	5–11	3	Youngstown State
71	Tom Higgins	25	T-G-DT	12	0	230	6–2	2	North Carolina
42	Bob Hudson	25	DB-LB-E	12	0	225	6–4	4	Clemson
63	Ken Huxhold	26	G	12	0	226	6–1	1	Wisconsin
78	Mike Jarmoluk	33	DT-T-MG	12	0	232	6–5	9	Temple
40	Don Johnson	24	HB	2	0	187	6–0	2	California
50	Bob Kelley	25	C	12	0	232	6–2	Rookie	West Texas A&M
76	Bucko Kilroy	34	G-MG-T-DT	1	0	243	6–2	12	Temple
79	Buck Lansford	22	G-T	12	12	232	6–2	Rookie	Texas
25	Toy Ledbetter	28	HB	8	0	198	5–10	5	Oklahoma State
67	John Magee	32	G	7	0	220	5–10	7	_{La-Lafayette, and Rice}
41	Jerry Norton	24	DB-HB	12	0	195	5–11	1	SMU
43	Jim Parmer	29	FB-HB	12	0	193	6–0	7	Oklahoma State
35	Pete Pihos +	32	E-DE	12	0	210	6–1	8	Indiana
71	Jim Ricca	28	MG-T-G-DT	6	0	270	6–4	4	Georgetown (DC)
72	Jess Richardson	25	DT	12	0	261	6–2	2	Alabama
52	Wayne Robinson	25	LB-C	12	0	225	6–2	3	Minnesota
82	Tom Scott	25	DE-LB	12	0	218	6–2	2	Virginia
66	Ed Sharkey	28	LB-G-T-DG	7	0	229	6–3	8	_{Duke, and Nevada-Reno}
73	Lum Snyder	25	T	12	0	228	6–5	3	Georgia Tech
80	Bill Stribling	28	E	12	0	206	6–1	4	Mississippi
24	George Taliaferro	28	HB-TB-QB-DB	3	0	196	5–11	6	Indiana
11	Bobby Thomason	27	QB	10	3	196	6–1	6	VMI
83	Bobby Walston	27	E-HB-K	12	0	190	6–0	4	Georgia ... Uga's page
77	Jim Weatherall	26	DT-T	12	0	245	6–4	Rookie	Oklahoma
46	Ted Wegert	23	HB	7	0	202	5–11	Rookie	none
86	Norm Willey +	27	DE-G-E	12	0	224	6–2	4	Marshall
75	Frank Wydo	31	T-DT	12	0	225	6–4	8	Cornell
	37 Players; Team Average	27.1		12		215.7	6–1.4	3.9	
