= 1955 New York Giants season =

NFL team season

- Owner: Tim Mara
- Head coach: Jim Lee Howell
- Home stadium: Polo Grounds

Results
- Record: 6–5–1
- Division place: 3rd NFL Eastern
- Playoffs: Did not qualify

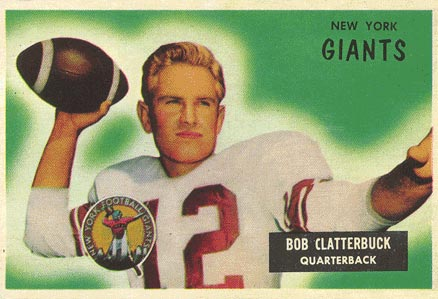
American football player Bobby Clatterbuck on a 1955 Bowman card.

The 1955 New York Giants season was the franchise's 31st season in the National Football League. It was also the Giants' last season playing their home games at the Polo Grounds before moving to Yankee Stadium the following year. The Giants were attempting to improve on their 7–5 record from 1954. The Giants finished with a 6–5–1 record, finishing in third place and missing the playoffs.

== Schedule ==
Game	Date	Opponent	Result	Record	Venue	Attendance	Recap	Sources
1	September 24	at **Philadelphia Eagles**	**L** 17–27	0–1	Connie Mack Stadium	29,597	Recap	
2	October 2	at **Chicago Cardinals**	**L** 17–28	0–2	Comiskey Park	9,555	Recap	
3	October 9	at **Pittsburgh Steelers**	**L** 23–30	0–3	Forbes Field	29,422	Recap	
4	October 16	**Chicago Cardinals**	**W** 10–0	1–3	Polo Grounds	7,000	Recap	
5	October 23	**Pittsburgh Steelers**	**L** 17–19	1–4	Polo Grounds	27,365	Recap	
6	October 30	**Washington Redskins**	**W** 35–7	2–4	Polo Grounds	17,402	Recap	
7	November 6	at **Cleveland Browns**	**L** 14–24	2–5	Cleveland Stadium	46,524	Recap	
8	November 13	Baltimore Colts	**W** 17–7	3–5	Polo Grounds	33,982	Recap	
9	November 20	**Philadelphia Eagles**	**W** 31–7	4–5	Polo Grounds	22,075	Recap	
10	November 27	**Cleveland Browns**	**T** 35–35	4–5–1	Polo Grounds	45,699	Recap	
11	December 4	at **Washington Redskins**	**W** 27–20	5–5–1	Griffith Stadium	28,556	Recap	
12	December 11	at Detroit Lions	**W** 24–19	6–5–1	Briggs Stadium	45,929	Recap	
Note: Intra-conference opponents are in **bold** text.

=== Standings ===
NFL Eastern Conference
	W	L	T	PCT	CONF	PF	PA	STK
Cleveland Browns	9	2	1	.818	7–2–1	349	218	W2
Washington Redskins	8	4	0	.667	6–4	246	222	W1
New York Giants	6	5	1	.545	4–5–1	267	223	W2
Philadelphia Eagles	4	7	1	.364	4–5–1	248	231	L1
Chicago Cardinals	4	7	1	.364	3–6–1	224	252	L2
Pittsburgh Steelers	4	8	0	.333	4–6	195	285	L7

Note: Tie games were not officially counted in the standings until 1972.

== Roster ==
1955 New York Giants roster
Quarterbacks (QB): 42 Charlie Conerly; 11 Don Heinrich; Running backs (RB): 35 Bobby Epps; 16 Frank Gifford; 48 Joe Heap; 31 Eddie Price; 33 Mel Triplett; 29 Alex Webster; Wide receivers (WR): 80 Ken MacAfee; 44 Kyle Rote RB; 85 Bob Schnelker; Tight ends (TE)	Offensive linemen (OL): 60 Bill Austin G; 79 Rosey Brown T; 67 George Kennard G; 66 Jack Stroud G; 55 Ray Wietecha C; 72 Dick Yelvington T; Defensive linemen (DL): 61 Ray Beck MG/G/DE; 73 Rex Boggan DT/T; 71 Rosey Grier DE/DT; 70 Ray Krouse DT/DE; 62 Stan West MG; 78 Walt Yowarsky DE	Linebackers (LB): 34 Pat Knight; 89 Cliff Livingston DE; 84 Harland Svare DE; 30 Bill Svoboda; Defensive backs (DB): 49 Tom Landry CB/P; 25 Dick Nolan CB; 20 Jimmy Patton S; 27 Herb Rich CB/S; 45 Emlen Tunnell S; Special teams (ST): 9 Ben Agajanian K	Reserve: 12 Bob Clatterbuck QB (IR); -- Pete Mangum LB (Military); -- Leo Miles S/CB (Military); -- Bob Topp WR (Military); 22 Larrye Weaver CB/RB (IR); Rookies in italics

== See also ==
- List of New York Giants seasons
