= Don Colo =

American football player (1925–2019)

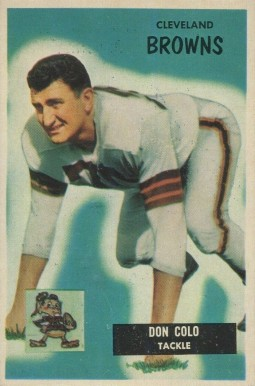
- Colo on a 1955 Bowman football card

No. 45, 36, 77, 70
- Position: Defensive tackle

Personal information
- Born: January 5, 1925; East Bridgewater, Massachusetts, U.S.
- Died: June 23, 2019 (aged 94); Phoenix, Arizona, U.S.
- Listed height: 6 ft 3 in (1.91 m)
- Listed weight: 252 lb (114 kg)

Career information
- High school: East Bridgewater
- College: Brown (1946–1949)
- NFL draft: 1950: 3rd round, 28th overall pick

Career history
- Baltimore Colts (1950); New York Yanks (1951); Dallas Texans (1952); Cleveland Browns (1953–1958)

Awards and highlights
- 2× NFL champion (1955, 1964); 5× Second-team All-Pro (1953–1957); 3× Pro Bowl (1954, 1955, 1958); Cleveland Browns legends (2015)

Career NFL statistics
- Interceptions: 2
- Interception yards: 11
- Fumble recoveries: 14
- Stats at Pro Football Reference

Donald Richard Colo (January 5, 1925 – June 23, 2019) was an American professional football player who was a defensive tackle for nine seasons in the National Football League (NFL), primarily with the Cleveland Browns. He was born in East Bridgewater, Massachusetts. He served in the US Navy during World War II. He died at the age of 94 on June 23, 2019.
