= Charley Jones (American football) =

American football player (1929–2000)

Charlie Jones
No. 83
- Position: Defensive end

Personal information
- Born: January 24, 1929; Summers, Arkansas
- Died: August 11, 2000 (aged 71)
- Listed height: 6 ft 1 in (1.85 m)
- Listed weight: 202 lb (92 kg)

Career information
- High school: Westville (Oklahoma)
- College: George Washington
- NFL draft: 1955: undrafted

Career history
- Washington Redskins (1955)

Career NFL statistics
- Games played: 10
- Games started: 0
- Fumble recoveries: 2
- Stats at Pro Football Reference

Charles Clifford Jones (January 24, 1929 – August 11, 2000) was an American professional football defensive end in the National Football League for the Washington Redskins. He attended George Washington University.
