= Ken Konz =

American football player (1928–2008)

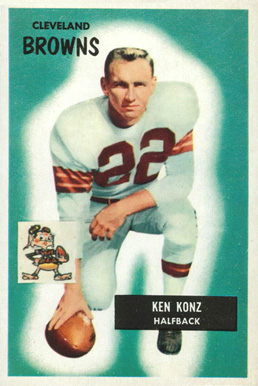
- Konz on a 1955 Bowman football card

No. 22
- Position: Defensive back

Personal information
- Born: September 25, 1928; Weimar, Texas, U.S.
- Died: February 5, 2008 (aged 79); Alliance, Ohio, U.S.
- Listed height: 5 ft 10 in (1.78 m)
- Listed weight: 184 lb (83 kg)

Career information
- High school: Weimar
- College: LSU (1947–1950)
- NFL draft: 1951: 1st round, 14th overall pick

Career history
- Cleveland Browns (1953–1959)

Awards and highlights
- 2× NFL champion (1954, 1955); 2× First-team All-Pro (1956, 1957); Pro Bowl (1955); First-team All-SEC (1950)

Career NFL statistics
- Interceptions: 30
- Int. return yards: 392
- Touchdowns: 5
- Stats at Pro Football Reference

Kenneth Earl Konz (September 25, 1928 – February 5, 2008) was an American professional football defensive back who played with the National Football League (NFL)'s Cleveland Browns from 1953 to 1959. Konz was selected by the Browns in the 1951 NFL draft out of Louisiana State.

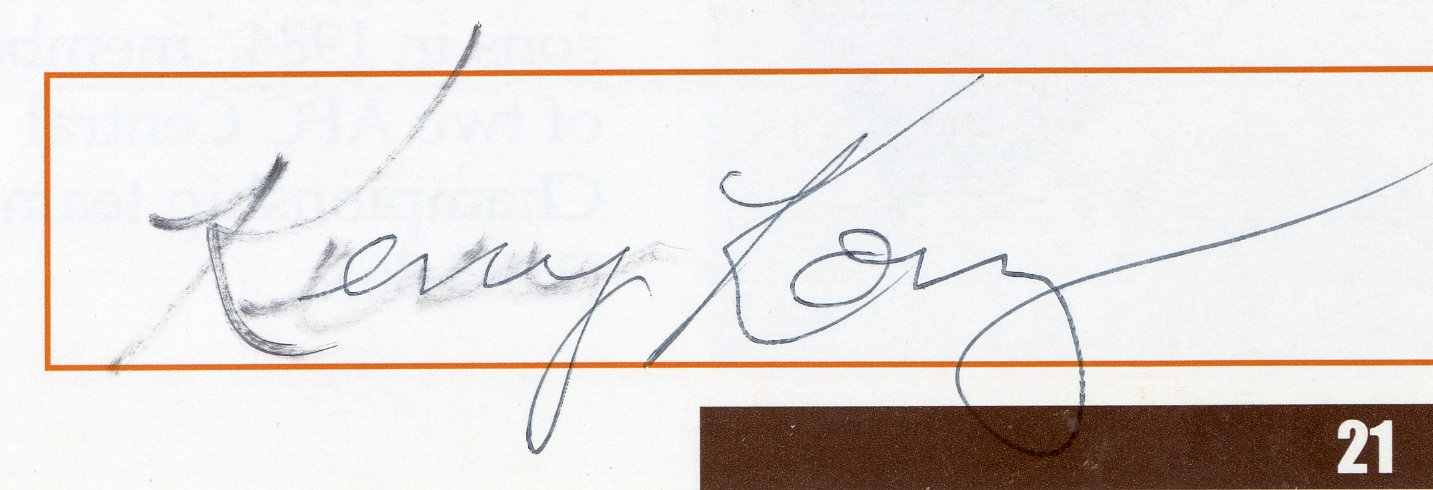
