= 1955 Pittsburgh Steelers season =

NFL team season

- Head coach: Walt Kiesling
- Home stadium: Forbes Field

Results
- Record: 4–8
- Division place: 6th NFL Eastern
- Playoffs: Did not qualify

The 1955 Pittsburgh Steelers season was the franchise's 23rd in the National Football League. The team tried to improve their record from the previous season of 5-7, but instead collapsed after a 4-1 start, like the previous season, this time losing their final seven games, finishing 4-8.

== Regular season ==
=== Schedule ===
Week	Date	Opponent	Result	Record	Venue	Recap
1	September 26	**Chicago Cardinals**	**W** 14–7	1–0	Forbes Field	Recap
2	October 2	at Los Angeles Rams	**L** 26–27	1–1	Los Angeles Memorial Coliseum	Recap
3	October 9	**New York Giants**	**W** 30–23	2–1	Forbes Field	Recap
4	October 15	**Philadelphia Eagles**	**W** 13–7	3–1	Forbes Field	Recap
5	October 23	at **New York Giants**	**W** 19–17	4–1	Polo Grounds	Recap
6	October 30	at **Philadelphia Eagles**	**L** 0–24	4–2	Connie Mack Stadium	Recap
7	November 5	at **Chicago Cardinals**	**L** 13–27	4–3	Comiskey Park	Recap
8	November 13	Detroit Lions	**L** 28–31	4–4	Forbes Field	Recap
9	November 20	at **Cleveland Browns**	**L** 14–41	4–5	Cleveland Municipal Stadium	Recap
10	November 27	**Washington Redskins**	**L** 14–23	4–6	Forbes Field	Recap
11	December 4	**Cleveland Browns**	**L** 7–30	4–7	Forbes Field	Recap
12	December 11	at **Washington Redskins**	**L** 17–28	4–8	Griffith Stadium	Recap

Note: Intra-conference opponents are in bold text.

=== Game summaries ===
==== Week 1 (Monday September 26, 1955): Chicago Cardinals ====
	1	2	3	4	Total
Cardinals	0	0	0	7	**7**
**Steelers**	0	0	7	7	**14**

at Forbes Field, Pittsburgh, Pennsylvania

- Game time:
- Game weather:
- Game attendance: 26,359
- Referee:
- TV announcers:

Scoring Drives:

- Pittsburgh – O'Brien 4 pass from Finks (Michalik kick)
- Chicago Cardinals – Sanford 92 interception (Summerall kick)
- Pittsburgh – Mathews 27 pass from Finks (Michalik kick)

==== Week 2 (Sunday October 2, 1955): Los Angeles Rams ====
	1	2	3	4	Total
Steelers	0	0	13	13	**26**
**Rams**	0	17	0	10	**27**

at Los Angeles Coliseum, Los Angeles, California

- Game time:
- Game weather:
- Game attendance: 46,185
- Referee:
- TV announcers:

Scoring Drives:

- Los Angeles – Towler 1 run (Richter kick)
- Los Angeles – FG Richter 12
- Los Angeles – Boyd 74 pass from Van Brocklin (Richter kick)
- Pittsburgh – Chandnois 8 run (Michalik kick)
- Pittsburgh – Finks 1 run (kick failed)
- Pittsburgh – Chandnois 2 run (kick failed)
- Los Angeles – Fears 17 pass from Van Brocklin (Richter kick)
- Pittsburgh – McCabe 50 fumble run (Michalik kick)
- Los Angeles – FG Richter 32

==== Week 3 (Sunday October 9, 1955): New York Giants ====
	1	2	3	4	Total
Giants	7	3	7	6	**23**
**Steelers**	0	6	10	14	**30**

at Forbes Field, Pittsburgh, Pennsylvania

- Game time:
- Game weather:
- Game attendance: 29,422
- Referee:
- TV announcers:

Scoring Drives:

- New York Giants – Rote 25 pass from Gifford (Agajanian kick)
- Pittsburgh – Bernet 13 pass from Finks (kick blocked)
- New York Giants – FG Agajanian 27
- Pittsburgh – FG Michalik 36
- Pittsburgh – Finks 1 run (Michalik kick)
- New York Giants – Long 34 pass from Conerly (Agajanian kick)
- Pittsburgh – Rogel 1 run (Michalik kick)
- New York Giants – Rote 71 pass from Conerly (kick blocked)
- Pittsburgh – Mathews 23 pass from Finks (Michalik kick)

==== Week 4 (Saturday November 15, 1955): Philadelphia Eagles ====
	1	2	3	4	Total
Eagles	0	7	0	0	**7**
**Steelers**	7	0	6	0	**13**

at Forbes Field, Pittsburgh, Pennsylvania

- Game time:
- Game weather:
- Game attendance: 33,413
- Referee:
- TV announcers:

Scoring Drives:

- Pittsburgh – Finks 1 run (Michalik kick)
- Philadelphia – Bawel 42 interception (Bielski kick)
- Pittsburgh – Chandnois 2 run (kick failed)

==== Week 5 (Sunday October 23, 1955): New York Giants ====
	1	2	3	4	Total
**Steelers**	6	7	6	0	**19**
Giants	7	7	3	0	**17**

at Polo Grounds, New York, New York

- Game time:
- Game weather:
- Game attendance: 27,365
- Referee:
- TV announcers:

Scoring Drives:

- Pittsburgh – Mathews 21 run (kick failed)
- New York Giants – Rote 5 pass from Heinrich (Agajanian kick)
- Pittsburgh – Finks 2 run (Michalik kick)
- New York Giants – Schnelker 16 pass from Conerly (Agajanian kick)
- New York Giants – FG Agajanian 45
- Pittsburgh – Chandnois 4 run (kick failed)

==== Week 6 (Sunday October 30, 1955): Philadelphia Eagles ====
	1	2	3	4	Total
Steelers	0	0	0	0	**0**
**Eagles**	0	0	14	10	**24**

at Connie Mack Stadium, Philadelphia, Pennsylvania

- Game time:
- Game weather:
- Game attendance: 31,164
- Referee:
- TV announcers:

Scoring Drives:

- Philadelphia – Wegert 29 run (Bielski kick)
- Philadelphia – Pihos 1- pass from Burk (Bielski kick)
- Philadelphia – Wegert 2 run (Bielski kick)
- Philadelphia – FG Bielski 50

==== Week 7 (Saturday November 5, 1955): Chicago Cardinals ====
	1	2	3	4	Total
Steelers	3	10	0	0	**13**
**Cardinals**	10	14	3	0	**27**

at Comiskey Park, Chicago, Illinois

- Game time:
- Game weather:
- Game attendance: 23,310
- Referee:
- TV announcers:

Scoring Drives:

- Pittsburgh – FG Weed 30
- Chicago Cardinals – FG Summerall 21
- Chicago Cardinals – Summerall 26 interception (Summerall kick)
- Pittsburgh – FG Weed 23
- Pittsburgh – Mathews 21 pass from Finks
- Chicago Cardinals – Nagler 34 pass from McHan (Summerall kick)
- Chicago Cardinals – Mann 18 pass from McHan (Summerall kick)
- Chicago Cardinals – FG Summerall 34

==== Week 8 (Sunday November 13, 1955): Detroit Lions ====
	1	2	3	4	Total
Lions	0	14	10	7	**31**
**Steelers**	0	7	0	21	**28**

at Forbes Field, Pittsburgh, Pennsylvania

- Game time:
- Game weather:
- Game attendance: 34,441
- Referee:
- TV announcers:

Scoring Drives:

- Detroit – Middleton 30 pass from Layne (Walker kick)
- Detroit – Carpenter 34 pass from Gilmer (Walker kick)
- Pittsburgh – O'Brien 6 pass from Finks (Weed kick)
- Detroit – FG Walker 23
- Detroit – Walker 21 pass from Stits (Walker kick)
- Pittsburgh – Chandnois 1 run (Weed kick)
- Detroit – Stits 7 interception
- Pittsburgh – Mathews 47 pass from Marchibroda (Weed kick)
- Pittsburgh – Marchibroda 8 run (Weed kick)

As of November 5, 2026, this remains the last time the Steelers lost to the Lions at home.

==== Week 9 (Sunday November 20, 1955): Cleveland Browns ====
	1	2	3	4	Total
Steelers	7	7	0	0	**14**
**Browns**	7	14	13	7	**41**

at Cleveland Municipal Stadium, Cleveland, Ohio

- Game time:
- Game weather:
- Game attendance: 53,509
- Referee:
- TV announcers:

Scoring Drives:

- Pittsburgh – Nickel 16 pass from Finks (Weed kick)
- Cleveland – Konz 15 interception (Groza kick)
- Cleveland – Lavelli 6 pass from Graham (Groza kick)
- Pittsburgh – Nickel 30 pass from Marchibroda (Weed kick)
- Cleveland – Lavelli 42 pass from Graham (Groza kick)
- Cleveland – Modzelewshi 3 run (kick blocked)
- Cleveland – Graham 4 run (Groza kick)
- Cleveland – Bassett 5 run (Groza kick)

==== Week 10 (Sunday November 27, 1955): Washington Redskins ====
	1	2	3	4	Total
**Redskins**	7	7	9	0	**23**
Steelers	0	7	0	7	**14**

at Forbes Field, Pittsburgh, Pennsylvania

- Game time:
- Game weather:
- Game attendance: 21,760
- Referee:
- TV announcers:

Scoring Drives:

- Washington – Elter 20 run (Hecker kick)
- Pittsburgh – Mathews 61 pass from Finks (Weed kick)
- Washington – Elter 33 run (Janowicz kick)
- Washington – FG Janowicz 13
- Washington – Scudero 49 punt return (kick failed)
- Pittsburgh – Watson 62 pass from Finks (Weed kick)

==== Week 11 (Sunday December 4, 1955): Cleveland Browns ====
	1	2	3	4	Total
**Browns**	10	10	10	0	**30**
Steelers	0	0	0	7	**7**

at Forbes Field, Pittsburgh, Pennsylvania

- Game time:
- Game weather:
- Game attendance: 31,101
- Referee:
- TV announcers:

Scoring Drives:

- Cleveland – Graham 4 run (Groza kick)
- Cleveland – FG Groza 16
- Cleveland – Renfro 46 pass from Graham (Groza kick)
- Cleveland – FG Groza 22
- Cleveland – Brewster 17 pass from Graham (Groza kick)
- Cleveland – FG Groza 46
- Pittsburgh – O'Malley recovered blocked kick in end zone (Weed kick)

==== Week 12 (Sunday December 11, 1955): Washington Redskins ====
	1	2	3	4	Total
Steelers	0	14	3	0	**17**
**Redskins**	7	0	7	14	**28**

at Griffith Stadium, Washington, DC

- Game time:
- Game weather:
- Game attendance: 20,547
- Referee:
- TV announcers:

Scoring Drives:

- Washington – Elter 22 run (Janowicz kick)
- Pittsburgh – Rogel 1 run (Weed kick)
- Pittsburgh – Mathews 29 pass from Finks (Weed kick)
- Pittsburgh – FG Weed 9
- Washington – Thomas 11 pass from LeBaron
- Washington – Atkeson 5 pass from LeBaron (Janowicz kick)
- Washington – Janowicz 3 run (Janowicz kick)

=== Standings ===
NFL Eastern Conference
	W	L	T	PCT	CONF	PF	PA	STK
Cleveland Browns	9	2	1	.818	7–2–1	349	218	W2
Washington Redskins	8	4	0	.667	6–4	246	222	W1
New York Giants	6	5	1	.545	4–5–1	267	223	W2
Philadelphia Eagles	4	7	1	.364	4–5–1	248	231	L1
Chicago Cardinals	4	7	1	.364	3–6–1	224	252	L2
Pittsburgh Steelers	4	8	0	.333	4–6	195	285	L7

Note: Tie games were not officially counted in the standings until 1972.

== Roster ==
1955 Pittsburgh Steelers roster
Quarterbacks (QB): 7 Jim Finks; 18 Ted Marchibroda; Running backs (RB): 28 Leon Campbell; 25 Ray Mathews; 33 Fran Rogel; 39 Sid Watson; Wide receivers (WR): 83 Ed Bernet; 87 Cy McClairen; 81 Elbie Nickel; 89 Jack O'Brien; Tight ends (TE)	Offensive linemen (OL): 72 Bob Gaona T; 66 John Schweder G; 70 Ernie Stautner G/DT; 61 Lou Tepe C/LB; 74 Frank Varrichione T; Defensive linemen (DL): 60 Dale Dodrill MG; 78 Lou Ferry DT; 76 Willie McClung DT; 84 Bill McPeak DE; 86 Ed Meadows DE; 62 Art Michalik MG/K; 79 Dick Modzelewski DT/T; 85 Joe O'Malley DE	Linebackers (LB): 57 Dick Flanagan; 61 Marv Matuszak; 50 John Reger; Defensive backs (DB): 80 Jack Butler CB; 41 Dick Doyle S; 12 Vic Eaton S/P; 42 Jim Hill S; 24 Dick McCabe CB; Special teams (ST): 27 Tad Weed K	Reserve: 49 Lynn Chandnois RB (IR); -- Don Fritz CB (Military); -- Johnny Lattner RB (Military); -- Marv McFadden G (Military); -- George Tarasovic DE (Military); Rookies in italics
