= Mike McCormack (American football) =

American football player and coach (1930–2013)

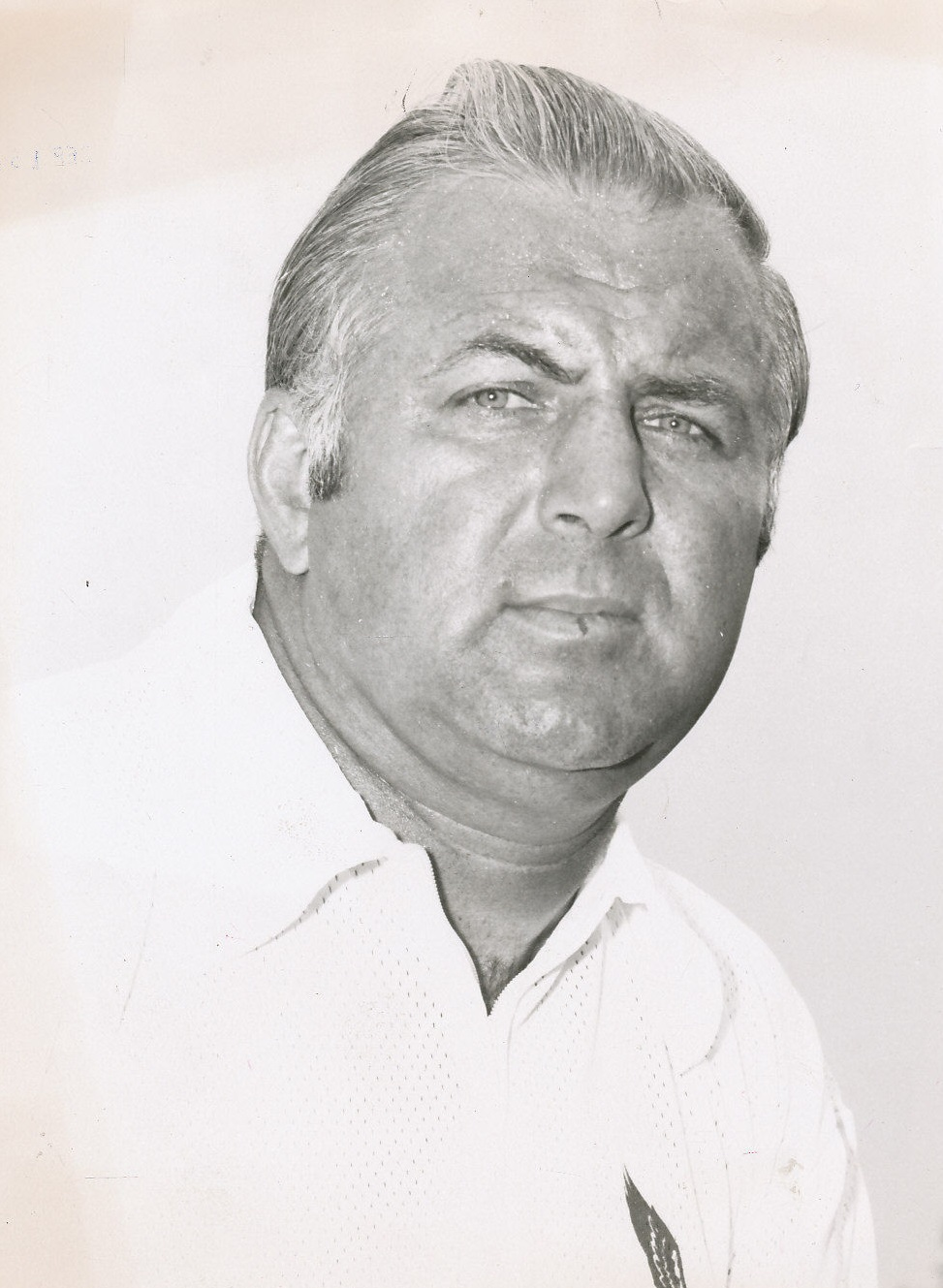
- McCormack in 1973

No. 71, 74
- Positions: Tackle, guard

Personal information
- Born: June 21, 1930; Chicago, Illinois, U.S.
- Died: November 15, 2013 (aged 83); Palm Desert, California, U.S.
- Listed height: 6 ft 4 in (1.93 m)
- Listed weight: 246 lb (112 kg)

Career information
- High school: Kansas City (MO) De LaSalle
- College: Kansas
- NFL draft: 1951: 3rd round, 34th overall pick

Career history

Playing
- New York Yanks (1951); Dallas Texans (1952); Cleveland Browns (1954–1962)

Coaching
- Washington Redskins (1965–1972) Assistant coach; Philadelphia Eagles (1973–1975) Head coach; Cincinnati Bengals (1976–1979) Assistant coach; Baltimore Colts (1980–1981) Head coach; Seattle Seahawks (1982) Interim head coach

Operations
- Seattle Seahawks (1982–1989) General manager; Carolina Panthers (1993–1997) President & general manager

Awards and highlights
- As a player: 2× NFL champion (1954, 1955); 9× All-Pro (1954–1962); 6× Pro Bowl (1951, 1956-1957, 1960-1962); Cleveland Browns Ring of Honor; First-team All-Big Seven (1950); As an executive: Carolina Panthers Hall of Honor

Career NFL statistics
- Games played: 119
- Games started: 117
- Fumble recoveries: 7
- Stats at Pro Football Reference

Head coaching record
- Regular season: 29–51–1 (.364)
- Coaching profile at Pro Football Reference
- Executive profile at Pro Football Reference
- Pro Football Hall of Fame

Michael Joseph McCormack Jr. (June 21, 1930 – November 15, 2013) was an American professional football player, coach, and executive in the National Football League (NFL). He played as an offensive tackle with the Cleveland Browns from 1954 through 1962 and served as head coach of the Philadelphia Eagles, Baltimore Colts, and Seattle Seahawks. He was elected to the Pro Football Hall of Fame in 1984.

== Playing career ==
McCormack played college football at University of Kansas and assumed that he would take up a career as a high school coach. He was selected by the New York Yanks in the 1951 NFL draft, but had to wait until the third round before being taken. After the 1951 season concluded, he was conscripted into the U.S. Army and served in the Korean War. While he was away, the Yanks moved to Dallas and became the Texans, which folded after just one season.

McCormack came home in 1954 to find that his team had ceased to exist, so he became a free agent and was immediately signed by the Baltimore Colts, a new franchise created the previous year to replace the defunct Yanks/Texans. Cleveland Browns founder Paul Brown had not forgotten seeing McCormack play in his rookie season three years earlier and was sufficiently impressed that he decided to add him to the roster in a trade exchange with Baltimore. In his first season with the team in 1954, he played on the defensive line, and famously grabbed the ball out of Lions QB Bobby Layne's hands (in what the referees ruled as a fumble recovery) in the 1954 NFL Championship game against the Detroit Lions, helping set up an important early touchdown.

The following season, he was shifted to offensive tackle and helped the Browns once again capture the NFL title. He played a key role in helping legendary running back Jim Brown become one of the dominant players in the game, ending his career with six selections to the Pro Bowl.

Paul Brown, legendary Cleveland Browns founder, owner, and coach, stated in his 1979 memoir, PB: The Paul Brown Story, "I consider (Mike) McCormack the finest offensive tackle who ever played pro football." Also, according to Paul Zimmerman's 1984 book, The New Thinking Man's Guide to Pro Football, Brown also stated that McCormack was the best offensive lineman he ever coached. The book states that McCormack "[c]ould handle the Colts' Gino Marchetti better than any tackle in the game. Power combined with great intelligence and 4.8 speed. 'I've seen him have games,' former player and NFL executive Bucko Kilroy says, 'where if you were grading him, he'd score 100. Not one mistake, and his guy would never make a tackle.'"

== Coaching career ==
McCormack retired from playing in 1962 and began coaching with the first of four consecutive stints as an assistant in the annual College All-Star Game. In 1965, he was hired as an assistant coach with the Washington Redskins, spending the next eight seasons working under four different head coaches, including former teammate Otto Graham from 1966–1968.

McCormack was hired to replace Ed Khayat as head coach of the Philadelphia Eagles on January 17, 1973. He inherited a team that ended 1972 in the NFC East cellar at 2–11–1 and hadn't had a winning campaign since 1966. Three seasons and a 16–25–1 record later, he was dismissed on December 22, 1975, following a 4–10 last-place finish.

After four years as offensive line coach with the Cincinnati Bengals from 1976 through 1979, he was selected over Frank Kush and George Welsh to succeed Ted Marchibroda as head coach of the Baltimore Colts on January 17, 1980. The ballclub finished in last place at 5–11 in each of the two seasons prior to McCormack's arrival. When the Colts fell from 7–9 in 1980 to 2–14 the following year, he was fired on December 21, 1981, and replaced by Kush the next day. As McCormack put it, "I wanted to be like my mentor, Paul Brown. He was a great teacher and I tried to do the same but unfortunately I always let my emotions carry me away."

== Administrative career ==
In 1982, McCormack joined the Seattle Seahawks, eventually becoming president and general manager. That year, the Seahawks lost their first two games, then a 57-day players strike ensued. During the hiatus, seventh-year head coach Jack Patera was fired in mid-October and McCormack took over as interim head coach. He led them to a 4–3 record, the only time he compiled a winning record as an NFL head coach, but Seattle did not qualify for the 16-team postseason. McCormack then returned to his management position when the Seahawks hired Chuck Knox as their new head coach in 1983 and declined all further offers to become a head coach.

In late January 1989, he was abruptly fired by the new Seahawks owner, Ken Behring, who explained the decision was necessary in order to make changes in the financial operations of the team. Later that year, McCormack became a consultant for Jerry Richardson and his ownership group that were seeking to land an NFL expansion team in Charlotte, North Carolina. In 1993, he was hired by the newly-formed Carolina Panthers as their team president and general manager, and their inaugural season was in 1995. He retired from the Panthers organization in 1997, which erected a monument in their stadium honoring him.

== Death ==
At the age of 83 in 2013, McCormack died of heart failure in Palm Desert, California.

== See also ==
- List of American Football League players
