= Mike Davlin =

American football player (1927–1996)

No. 73
- Position: Offensive tackle

Personal information
- Born: November 2, 1927; Omaha, Nebraska
- Died: March 28, 1996 (aged 68)

Career information
- College: Notre Dame; San Francisco

Career history
- 1955: Washington Redskins
- Stats at Pro Football Reference

Michael Francis Davlin (November 2, 1927 – March 28, 1996) was an American football offensive tackle in the National Football League for the Washington Redskins. He played college football at the University of Notre Dame and the University of San Francisco.
