= Don Paul (defensive back) =

American football player (1926–2001)

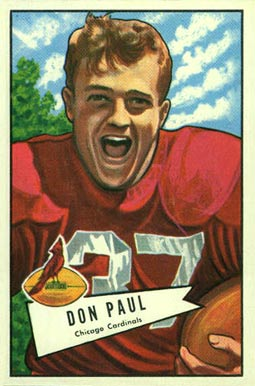
- Paul on a 1952 Bowman football card

No. 37, 22, 20
- Positions: Cornerback, halfback, return specialist

Personal information
- Born: July 23, 1926; Tacoma, Washington, U.S.
- Died: September 7, 2001 (aged 75); Eugene, Oregon, U.S.
- Listed height: 6 ft 0 in (1.83 m)
- Listed weight: 187 lb (85 kg)

Career information
- High school: Fife (Fife, Washington)
- College: Washington State
- NFL draft: 1950: 4th round, 47th overall pick

Career history
- Chicago Cardinals (1950–1953); Cleveland Browns (1954–1958)

Awards and highlights
- 2× NFL champion (1954, 1955); 2× Second-team All-Pro (1955, 1957); 4× Pro Bowl (1953, 1956–1958); First-team All-PCC (1949)

Career NFL statistics
- Interceptions: 34
- Interception yards: 593
- Fumble recoveries: 9
- Total touchdowns: 14
- Stats at Pro Football Reference

Don Paul (July 23, 1926 – September 7, 2001) was an American professional football cornerback, halfback and return specialist who played for the Chicago Cardinals (1950–1953) and the Cleveland Browns (1954–1958) in the National Football League (NFL).

== Early life ==
Paul was born in Tacoma, Washington. He grew up playing for the 38th Street team in the Tacoma City League before excelling at Fife High School. Paul attended Washington State University and lettered in both football (1947–1949) and baseball. He played third base for the 1950 baseball team that finished as a runner-up in the 1950 College World Series. In addition to being an All-Conference running back in 1949, he set a record for punt return average in a season. He scored three touchdowns against Stanford in a 1946 game that was tied for the school record for three decades. In 1978, he was inducted into the State of Washington Sports Hall of Fame. In 1982, he was inducted into the Washington State Athletics Hall of Fame. In 1995, he was named to the Spokesman-Review's All-Century football team.

== Professional career ==
Paul was the 47th overall pick of the 1950 draft. Playing for the Chicago Cardinals, he played defensive back, running back and returned kickoffs and punts for Chicago. He scored his first touchdown on an 82-yard punt return on November 19, 1950, in a 14–10 victory over the Philadelphia Eagles. He scored his only rushing touchdowns in 1951, scoring three on 37 carries for 247 yards. He also caught seven touchdown passes during his career. The Cardinals won just thirteen games in Paul's four seasons there, but he earned a Pro Bowl selection in 1953, having intercepted five passes in the season.

On January 30, 1954, Paul was traded by the Cardinals to the Washington Redskins. Soon after, Paul stated his displeasure at playing for newly hired Joe Kuharich, who he had disagreed with two years prior when the latter was head coach. On August 29, Cleveland traded Johnny Carson and fullback Dale Atkeson to Washington to acquire Paul. In five seasons with Cleveland, Paul would make the Pro Bowl three times while intercepting 22 passes, most notably nabbing seven in 1956 (his one interception return for a touchdown came during the year).

Paul played in three NFL Championship Games, which saw Cleveland win twice. In the 1954 and 1955 games, he recorded an interception in each game, with his interception in the 1955 game going down for a touchdown that gave Cleveland a 10–0 lead in the second quarter of a game they ultimately won 38–14. He closed out his career with the 1958 playoff against the New York Giants, which the Browns lost 10–0. After the game, he retired at the age of 32. In his career, he returned 113 punts for 902 yards and two touchdowns along with returning 57 kicks for 1,417 yards.
