= Jack O'Brien (American football) =

American football player (born 1932)

No. 89
- Position: End

Personal information
- Born: October 21, 1932; Jeannette, Pennsylvania, U.S.
- Died: December 22, 2016 (aged 84); Titusville, Florida, U.S.
- Listed height: 6 ft 2 in (1.88 m)
- Listed weight: 213 lb (97 kg)

Career information
- High school: Jeannette
- College: Florida (1950–1953)
- NFL draft: 1954: 7th round, 79th overall pick

Career history

Playing
- Pittsburgh Steelers (1954–1956)

Coaching
- Wheeling Ironmen (1965) Line coach; Orlando Panthers (1966) Line coach

Career NFL statistics
- Receptions: 16
- Receiving yards: 185
- Touchdowns: 2
- Stats at Pro Football Reference

John Edward O'Brien (October 21, 1932 – December 22, 2016) was an American professional football player who was an end for three seasons in the National Football League (NFL) during the mid-1950s. O'Brien played college football for the Florida Gators, and thereafter, he played in the NFL for the Pittsburgh Steelers.

== Early life ==
O'Brien was born in Jeannette, Pennsylvania, in 1932. He attended Jeannette Senior High School, and he played for the Jeannette Jayhawks high school football team.

== College career ==
O'Brien attended the University of Florida in Gainesville, Florida, where he played for coach Bob Woodruff's Gators teams from 1951 to 1953. In an era when college football rules allowed only limited player substitutions, he played both offensive end and defensive end, and was rated as one of the Gators' five best ends of the 1950s by coach Woodruff. O'Brien was a junior starter for the 1952 Gators team that posted an 8–3 record and defeated the Tulsa Golden Hurricane 14–13 in the 1953 New Year's Day Gator Bowl—the first NCAA-sanctioned post-season bowl game in Gators history. Together with running back Rick Casares, he was a senior team captain in 1953. Woodruff later ranked O'Brien as one of the Gators' five best receivers of the 1950s.

After his NFL career was over, O'Brien returned to Gainesville and graduated from the University of Florida with a bachelor's degree in physical education in 1958.

== Professional career ==
The Pittsburgh Steelers selected O'Brien in the seventh round (seventy-ninth pick overall) of the 1954 NFL draft, and he played in thirty-one games for the Steelers during three seasons from 1954 to 1956. In an era of run-oriented offenses, O'Brien made the most of his few catches—he had sixteen receptions for 185 yards (an average of 11.6 yards per catch) and two touchdowns.

== See also ==
- Florida Gators football, 1950–59
- List of Florida Gators in the NFL draft
- List of Pittsburgh Steelers players
- List of University of Florida alumni
