= James Thomas Norman =

American football player (born 1934)

No. 66
- Position: Offensive tackle

Personal information
- Born: January 2, 1934 (age 92); Fortress Monroe, Virginia

Career information
- College: none

Career history
- 1955: Washington Redskins
- 1956–1958: Hamilton Tiger Cats

Awards and highlights
- Grey Cup champion (1957)
- Stats at Pro Football Reference

James Thomas Norman (born January 2, 1934) is an American former football offensive lineman in the National Football League for the Washington Redskins. He did not attend college.
