= Jack Stroud =

American football player (1928–1994)

No. 66
- Positions: Guard, tackle

Personal information
- Born: January 29, 1928; Fresno, California, U.S.
- Died: June 1, 1994 (aged 66); Flemington, New Jersey, U.S.
- Listed height: 6 ft 1 in (1.85 m)
- Listed weight: 235 lb (107 kg)

Career information
- High school: Lowell (San Francisco, California)
- College: Tennessee (1947–1950)
- NFL draft: 1951: 5th round, 61st overall pick

Career history
- New York Giants (1953–1964); Newark Bears (1965)

Awards and highlights
- NFL champion (1956); 5× Second-team All-Pro (1956, 1957, 1960–1962); 3× Pro Bowl (1955, 1957, 1960); 44th greatest New York Giant of all-time

Career NFL statistics
- Games played: 132
- Games started: 110
- Fumble recoveries: 5
- Stats at Pro Football Reference

Jack Chester Stroud (January 29, 1928 – June 1, 1994) was an American professional football player who was an offensive lineman for the New York Giants of the National Football League (NFL). He played college football for the Tennessee Volunteers and was selected in the fifth round of the 1951 NFL draft. He was a member of the 1956 Giants championship squad.

While at the University of Tennessee, Stroud was also a member of the track and field team and twice placed first in the javelin throw (1950, 1951) at the Southeastern Conference (SEC) meet.

In December 1970, Stroud's son, Jack Jr., died at age 19 from complications following shoulder surgery. The younger Stroud was a freshman football player at Tennessee.
