= 1955 Chicago Cardinals season =

American football team season

- Head coach: Ray Richards
- Home stadium: Comiskey Park

Results
- Record: 4–7–1
- Division place: 4th (tied) NFL Eastern
- Playoffs: Did not qualify

The 1955 Chicago Cardinals season marked the 36th year the team was in the National Football League (NFL). The team improved on their previous output of 2–10 by winning four games. Although they escaped the cellar of the Eastern Conference, they failed to qualify for the playoffs for the seventh consecutive season.

== Schedule ==
Week	Date	Opponent	Result	Record	Venue	Attendance	Recap	Sources
1	September 26	at **Pittsburgh Steelers**	**L 7–14**	0–1	Forbes Field	26,359	Recap	
2	October 2	**New York Giants**	**W** 28–17	1–1	Comiskey Park	9,555	Recap	
3	October 9	at **Washington Redskins**	**W** 24–10	2–1	Griffith Stadium	26,337	Recap	
4	October 16	at **New York Giants**	**L** 0–10	2–2	Polo Grounds	7,000	Recap	
5	October 23	**Philadelphia Eagles**	**T** 24–24	2–2–1	Comiskey Park	24,620	Recap	
6	October 30	**Cleveland Browns**	**L** 20–26	2–3–1	Comiskey Park	29,471	Recap	
7	November 5	**Pittsburgh Steelers**	**W** 27–13	3–3–1	Comiskey Park	23,310	Recap	
8	November 13	at Green Bay Packers	**L** 14–31	3–4–1	City Stadium	20,104	Recap	
9	November 20	**Washington Redskins**	**L** 0–31	3–5–1	Comiskey Park	16,901	Recap	
10	November 27	Chicago Bears	**W** 53–14	4–5–1	Comiskey Park	47,314	Recap	
11	December 4	at **Philadelphia Eagles**	**L** 3–27	4–6–1	Connie Mack Stadium	19,378	Recap	
12	December 11	at **Cleveland Browns**	**L** 24–35	4–7–1	Municipal Stadium	25,914	Recap	
Note: Intra-conference opponents are in **bold** text.

== Standings ==
NFL Eastern Conference
	W	L	T	PCT	CONF	PF	PA	STK
Cleveland Browns	9	2	1	.818	7–2–1	349	218	W2
Washington Redskins	8	4	0	.667	6–4	246	222	W1
New York Giants	6	5	1	.545	4–5–1	267	223	W2
Philadelphia Eagles	4	7	1	.364	4–5–1	248	231	L1
Chicago Cardinals	4	7	1	.364	3–6–1	224	252	L2
Pittsburgh Steelers	4	8	0	.333	4–6	195	285	L7

Note: Tie games were not officially counted in the standings until 1972.

== Personnel ==
=== Staff / Coaches ===
1955 Chicago Cardinals staff
Front office: Principal Owner - Violet Bidwill Wolfner; Managing Director - Walter Wolfner; Head coaches: Head Coach – Ray Richards; Offensive coaches: Backfield Coach - Tommy Thompson; Ends Coach - Bob Nowaskey; Line Coach - Otis Douglas	Defensive coaches: Defensive Line Coach - John Kellison

Official team photo of the 1955 Chicago Cardinals.

1955 Chicago Cardinals roster
Quarterbacks (QB): 17 Ogden Compton; 8 Lamar McHan; Running backs (RB): 24 Jimmy Carr; 31 Mal Hammack; 44 Dave Mann P; 33 Ollie Matson CB; 36 Johnny Olszewski; Wide receivers (WR): 83 Max Boydston; 87 Dick Brubaker; 89 Frank McPhee; 80 Don Stonesifer; Tight ends (TE)	Offensive linemen (OL): 65 Johnny Hatley G; 70 Jack Jennings T; 68 Bill Lange G; 60 Gordon Polofsky G; 50 Jack Simmons C; 74 Len Teeuws T/DT; 60 Harry Thompson G; Defensive linemen (DL): 82 Tom Bienemann DE; 76 Burt Delavan DT/T; 57 Jerry Groom MG/DT; 84 Leo Sugar DE; 85 Pat Summerall DE/K; 72 Chuck Ulrich DT	Linebackers (LB): 51 Leo Sanford C; 61 Fred Wallner; Defensive backs (DB): 49 Frank Bernardi S/RB; 40 Lindon Crow CB; 20 Les Goble S/CB/RB; 41 Jimmy Hill S/CB; 21 Tom Keane S; 81 Night Train Lane CB/WR; 2 Charley Trippi P/S; Special teams (ST)	Reserve: -- George Brancato CB/RB (IR); -- Alex Burl RB (Military); -- Ed Cook T (Military); -- Tony Curcillo LB/FB (Military); -- Ed Husmann G (Military); 64 Larry Hartshorn G (IR); 7 Dave Leggett QB/CB (Military); 86 Gern Nagler WR (IR); 75 Tony Pasquesi MG (IR); -- Dave Suminski G (Military); Rookies in italics
