= Marv Matuszak =

American football player (1931–2004)

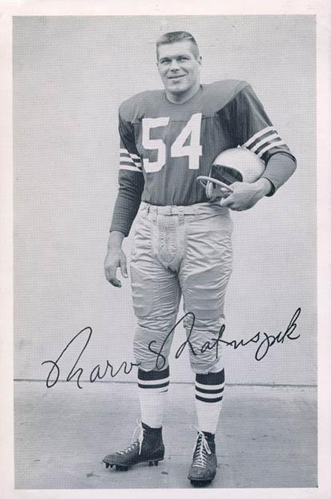

No. 62, 61, 56, 54, 63, 64, 55
- Position: Linebacker

Personal information
- Born: September 12, 1931; South Bend, Indiana, U.S.
- Died: February 28, 2004 (aged 72); South Bend, Indiana, U.S.
- Listed height: 6 ft 3 in (1.91 m)
- Listed weight: 232 lb (105 kg)

Career information
- High school: Washington (South Bend)
- College: Tulsa (1952)
- NFL draft: 1953: 3rd round, 29th overall pick

Career history

Playing
- Pittsburgh Steelers (1953–1956); San Francisco 49ers (1957–1958); Green Bay Packers (1958); Baltimore Colts (1959–1961); Buffalo Bills (1962–1963); Denver Broncos (1964)

Coaching
- Denver Broncos (1966) Defensive backs coach; Alabama Hawks (1967) Head coach; BC Lions (1968–1970) Assistant coach; New Orleans Saints (1971–1973) Linebackers coach; Atlanta Falcons (1974–1976) Linebackers coach; Washington Redskins (1977) Defensive assistant

Awards and highlights
- NFL champion (1959); First-team All-Pro (1957); 2× Pro Bowl (1953, 1957); AFL All-Star (1962); 2× First-team All-American (1951, 1952); Tulsa Golden Hurricane Jersey No. 64 retired

Career NFL/AFL statistics
- Interceptions: 14
- Fumble recoveries: 8
- Sacks: 10.5
- Stats at Pro Football Reference

Marvin H. Matuszak (September 12, 1931 – February 28, 2004) was an American professional football linebacker in the National Football League (NFL) and American Football League (AFL). He went to two NFL Pro Bowls and was once an AFL All-Star during his 12-year professional football career. After retiring, he was an assistant coach in the professional ranks for 16 seasons for five different teams. The South Bend native was inducted into the Indiana Football Hall of Fame in 1987.

== See also ==
- Other American Football League players
