= Walter Bingham (sportswriter) =

American sportswriter and golf historian (1930–2020)

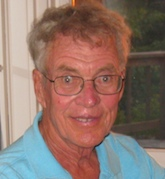
- Born: August 27, 1930; East Orange, New Jersey, U.S.
- Died: May 13, 2020 (aged 89); Duxbury, Massachusetts, U.S.
- Occupation: Journalist
- Spouse: Betty Bingham

Walter Adams Bingham, Jr. (August 27, 1930 – May 13, 2020) was an American sportswriter and golf historian.

== Early life ==
Bingham was born on August 27, 1930, in Orange, New Jersey. He graduated from The Hill School in Pottstown, Pennsylvania, attended Yale University for one semester before moving to Los Angeles where he took courses at UCLA and worked as a copy boy at the Los Angeles Examiner. During the Korean War he enlisted with the United States Air Force.

== Career ==
Bingham was a writer and editor at Sports Illustrated from 1955-1989. During his career at Sports Illustrated he covered tennis, baseball, golf, college football and bridge. In 1982, he was named Assistant Managing Editor.

In 1983, Bingham left Sports Illustrated to join Time magazine at the request of its Managing Editor, Ray Cave. There, he helped organize coverage of the 1984 Winter and Summer Olympics.

In 2002, Bingham joined the Cape Cod Times as a sports columnist. His primary topic is PGA golf, but he also muses on life on Cape Cod and running.

== Running ==
In 1963, while covering the Boston Marathon for Sports Illustrated, it dawned on Bingham that here was a major sporting event which the average man could enter. On lunch hours he trained for the race after the summer of 1964 in the W. 63rd Street YMCA in New York. With only about 350 runners, Bingham ran Boston in 1965 in 3:45 and finished 200th. His personal best was 3:22 in 1966.

He finished the New York Marathon in 3:36 in 1980. In 1981, he finished with a personal best of 3:13. He explained his unusual improvement running over the age of 50, "The nice thing about this sport, is that you always seem to improve as long as you keep working at it."

In 1976, with his wife Betty, he co-founded the Port Washington Thanksgiving Day Five Mile race as a fund-raiser for the Save our Sports program for the local high school. In 2008, over 2000 runners participated in the event benefitting local charities.

== Death ==
Bingham died of chronic lymphocytic leukemia on May 13, 2020.
