= Roy Barni =

American football player (1927–1957)

No. 49, 33, 21
- Position: Defensive back

Personal information
- Born: February 15, 1927; San Francisco, California
- Died: July 22, 1957 (aged 30)

Career information
- College: San Francisco

Career history
- 1952–1953: Chicago Cardinals
- 1954–1955: Philadelphia Eagles
- 1955–1956: Washington Redskins
- Stats at Pro Football Reference

Roy Bruno Barni (February 15, 1927 – July 22, 1957) was an American football defensive back in the National Football League for the Chicago Cardinals, Philadelphia Eagles, and the Washington Redskins. He played college football at the University of San Francisco.

He intercepted 11 passes during his career including six when playing with the Cardinals in 1952. Barni, who played for the Redskins in 1955 and 1956, was shot and killed in a bar in San Francisco prior to the 1957 season.
