= 1954 NFL Championship Game =

Coordinates: 41.506°N 81.700°W

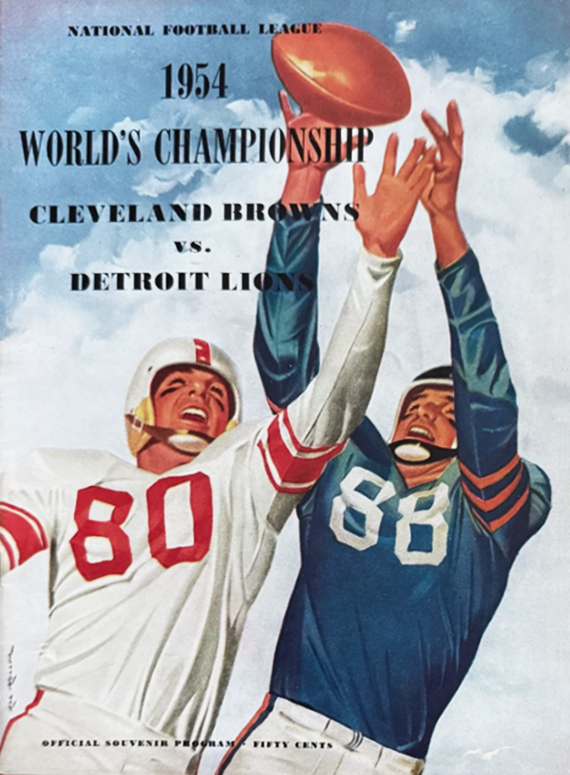
Detroit Lions (Western) (9–2–1)	Cleveland Browns (Eastern) (9–3)
10	56
Head coach: Buddy Parker	Head coach: Paul Brown
	1	2	3	4	Total
DET	3	7	0	0	10
CLE	14	21	14	7	56
- Date: December 26, 1954
- Stadium: Cleveland Municipal Stadium; Cleveland, Ohio
- Attendance: 43,827

TV in the United States
- Network: DuMont
- Announcers: Byrum Saam and Chuck Thompson

Radio in the United States
- Network: Mutual
- Announcers: Earl Gillespie and Chris Schenkel

The 1954 NFL Championship Game was the National Football League's 22nd annual championship game, held on December 26 at Cleveland Municipal Stadium in Cleveland, Ohio. Billed as the "1954 World Professional Football Championship Game," the turnover-plagued contest was won by the Cleveland Browns, who defeated the Detroit Lions 56–10, denying the Lions a three-peat.

== Background ==
The Detroit Lions (9–2–1) of the Western Conference met the Cleveland Browns (9–3) of the Eastern Conference in the NFL title game for the third consecutive year. The Lions won the previous two: 17–7 at Cleveland in 1952 and 17–16 at home in Briggs Stadium in 1953. They were attempting to become the first team to win three consecutive league titles in the championship game era (since 1933). The Browns, who entered the league only in 1950 with the demise of the All-America Football Conference, faced a particularly daunting task in taking on the Lions, having lost all eight of the franchise's previous matches against the Detroit club.

The Lions were led by quarterback Bobby Layne, running back Doak Walker, and head coach Buddy Parker. The Browns were led by head coach Paul Brown and quarterback Otto Graham. The Lions had won the regular season meeting 14–10 the week before on December 19, also at Cleveland, with a late touchdown. The game had been postponed from early October, due to the World Series, and both teams had already clinched their berths in the title game. Detroit was a slight favorite (2½ to 3 points) to three-peat as champions.

The underdog Browns won the title at home in a rout, 56–10; placekicker Lou Groza made eight extra points, a new title game record, among many.

== Starters ==
Note: Players often played both offense and defense in this period. Although free substitution existed from 1943, what are today considered defensive starters were categorized as "substitutes" in this era.

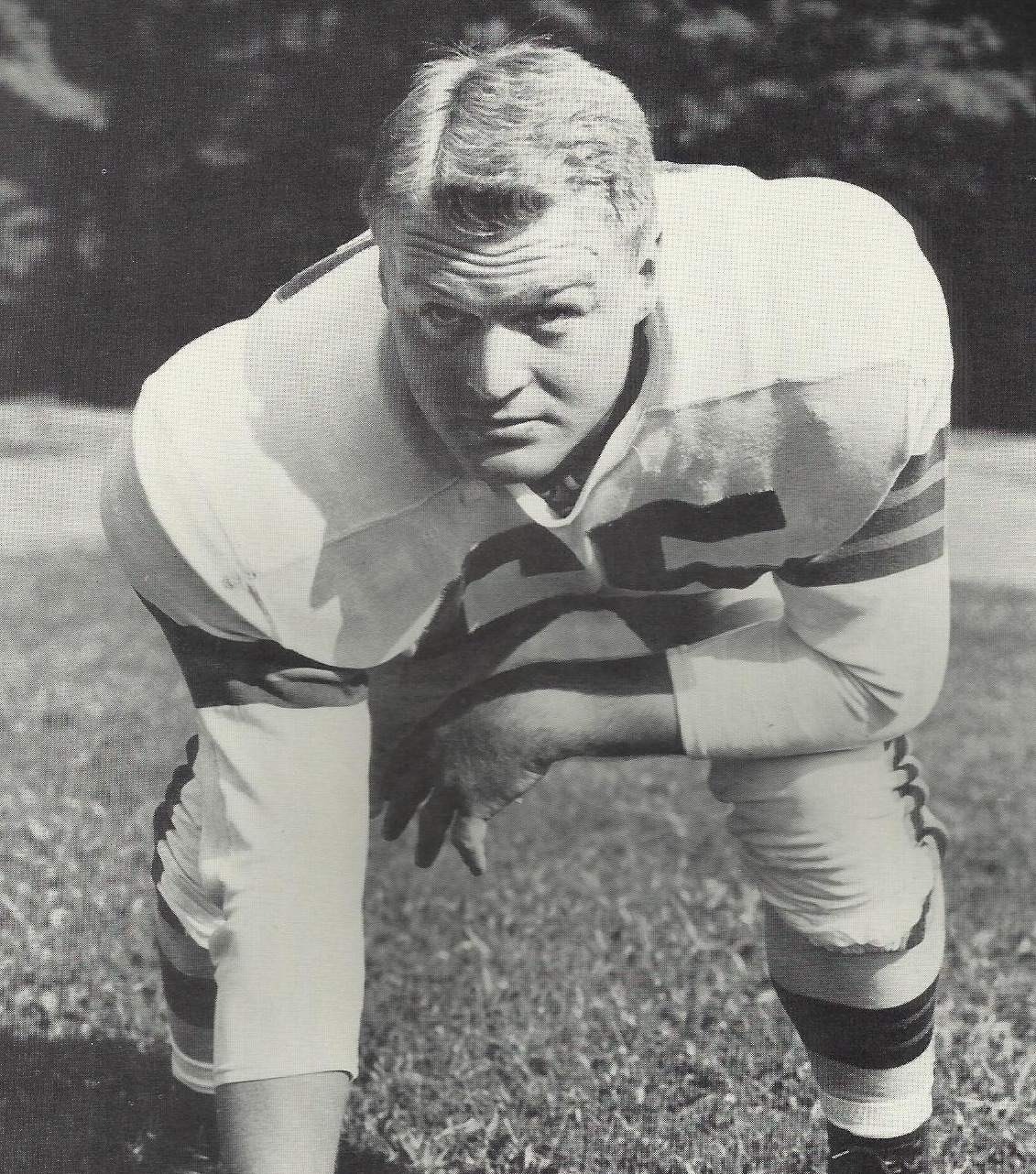
Cleveland right guard Chuck Noll went on to become the Hall of Fame coach of the Pittsburgh Steelers.

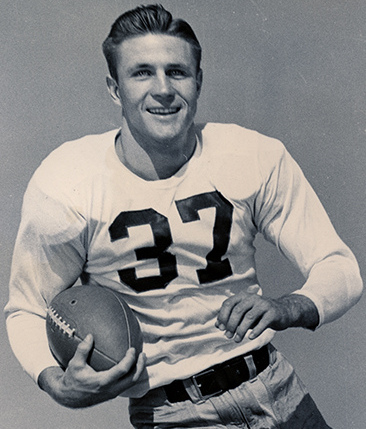
Detroit Left halfback Doak Walker is the namesake of the annual award presented to the best running back in college football.

Cleveland Browns	—	Detroit Lions
Name	Position	Name
Pete Brewster	Left End	Dorne Dibble
Lou Groza	Left Tackle	Lou Creekmur
Abe Gibron	Left Guard	Harley Sewell
Frank Gatski	Center	Andy Miketa
Chuck Noll	Right Guard	Jim Martin
John Sandusky	Right Tackle	Charles Ane
Dante Lavelli	Right End	Jug Girard
Otto Graham	Quarterback	Bobby Layne
Ray Renfro	Left Halfback	Doak Walker
Billy Reynolds	Right Halfback	Lewis Carpenter
Maurice Bassett	Fullback	Bill Bowman

== Game summary ==
On its first possession, Lions' fullback Bill Bowman ran for 50 yards but suffered the first of numerous turnovers on a fumble. The Lions caught a break when Joe Schmidt soon intercepted an Otto Graham pass to give the Lions the ball at the Cleveland 35-yard line. While Detroit gained some yards, Cleveland forced them to resort to a field goal try by Doak Walker, which was good from 36 yards out to score the first points of the game. Billy Reynolds returned the subsequent kickoff 46 yards for Cleveland, crossing midfield to the Lions' 41-yard line. Cleveland was aiming to punt a few plays later, but a roughing penalty gave the Browns new life and Graham hit Ray Renfro with a 35-yard pass for a touchdown to give them a 7–3 lead. Cleveland was given the chance to pounce quickly when Bobby Layne's pass landed in the hands of defensive back Don Paul, who returned it 33 yards to the Detroit 8-yard line. Graham soon hit Pete Brewster for a touchdown pass to further Cleveland's lead to 14-3. A subsequent punt by Detroit was returned by Reynolds 46 yards to the 10-yard line of Detroit and a couple of plays later, Graham did a quarterback sneak from the 1-yard line for a touchdown.

Lion running back Lewis Carpenter tore up a 52-yard run in Detroit's next possession, setting up Detroit for its only touchdown of the day when fullback Bill Bowman scored from five yards out to narrow the score to 21-10. Detroit forced a punt to get the ball back, but soon after, defensive lineman Mike McCormack ripped the ball from Layne to give the Browns the ball at the 31-yard line. Four plays later, Graham ran for another touchdown to give Cleveland a commanding 28–10 lead. The last score of the half came on a Layne interception by substitute fullback/defensive player Walt Michaels that set up Cleveland for easy positioning at the 31-yard line. Graham launched a touchdown pass to Ray Renfro that he corralled for a touchdown to close the half out for Cleveland with a 35–10 lead.

The Browns opened the second half with a six-play drive, highlighted by a 43-yard strike from Graham to Brewster that gave Cleveland the ball at the one for Graham to soon score again on a touchdown sneak for his third rushing touchdown. Kenny Konz grabbed the first of his two interceptions soon after, running the ball back to the Detroit 13. Two plays later, substitute fullback Curly Morrison scored on a 12-yard run. Konz's second interception set up the final touchdown of the day, when substitute halfback Chet Hanulak scored from the 10-yard line on a run.

== Scoring summary ==
Cleveland Browns 56, Detroit Lions 10

Quarter	1	2	3	4	Total
Lions	3	7	0	0	10
Browns	14	21	14	7	56

at Cleveland Stadium, Cleveland, Ohio

- Date: December 26, 1954
- Game time: 2 p.m. EST
- Game attendance: 43,827
- TV announcers (DuMont): Byrum Saam and Chuck Thompson
- Pro-Football-Reference.com

Game information

- First quarter
  - DET – Doak Walker 36-yard field goal. 3–0 DET
  - CLE – Ray Renfro 37-yard pass from Otto Graham (Lou Groza kick). 7–3 CLE
  - CLE – Pete Brewster 8-yard pass from Otto Graham (Lou Groza kick). 14–3 CLE
- Second quarter
  - CLE – Otto Graham 1-yard rush (Groza kick). 21–3 CLE
  - DET – Bill Bowman 5-yard rush (Walker kick). 21–10 CLE
  - CLE – Otto Graham 5-yard rush (Groza kick). 28–10 CLE
  - CLE – Ray Renfro 31-yard pass from Graham (Groza kick). 35–10 CLE
- Third quarter
  - CLE – Otto Graham 1-yard rush (Groza kick). 42–10 CLE
  - CLE – Fred Morrison 12-yard rush (Groza kick). 49–10 CLE
- Fourth quarter
  - CLE – Chet Hanulak 10-yard rush (Groza kick). 56–10 CLE

Top passers

- DET – Bobby Layne – 18/42, 177 yards, 6 INT
- CLE – Otto Graham – 9/12, 163 yards, 3 TD, 2 INT

Top rushers

- DET – Lew Carpenter – 8 rushes, 64 yards
- CLE – Chet Hanulak – 5 rushes, 44 yards, TD

Top receivers

- DET – Lew Carpenter – 6 receptions, 17 yards
- CLE – Ray Renfro – 5 receptions, 94 yards, 2TD

== Game statistics ==
Statistics	Detroit	Cleveland
First downs	16	17
Rush-Yards	28-152	45-140
Cmp-Att-Yd-TD-INT	19-44-195-0-6	9-12-163-3-2
Sack Yds Lost	16	0
Net Pass Yards	179	163
Total yards	331	303
Fumbles-Lost	3-3	2-2
Turnovers	9	4
Penalties-Yards	5-63	4-40

== Officials ==
- Referee: Tom Timlin
- Umpire: Sam Wilson
- Head linesman: Dan Tehan
- Back judge: James Hamer
- Field judge: William McHugh

The NFL added the fifth official, the back judge, in 1947; the line judge arrived in 1965, and the side judge in 1978.

== Financial summary ==
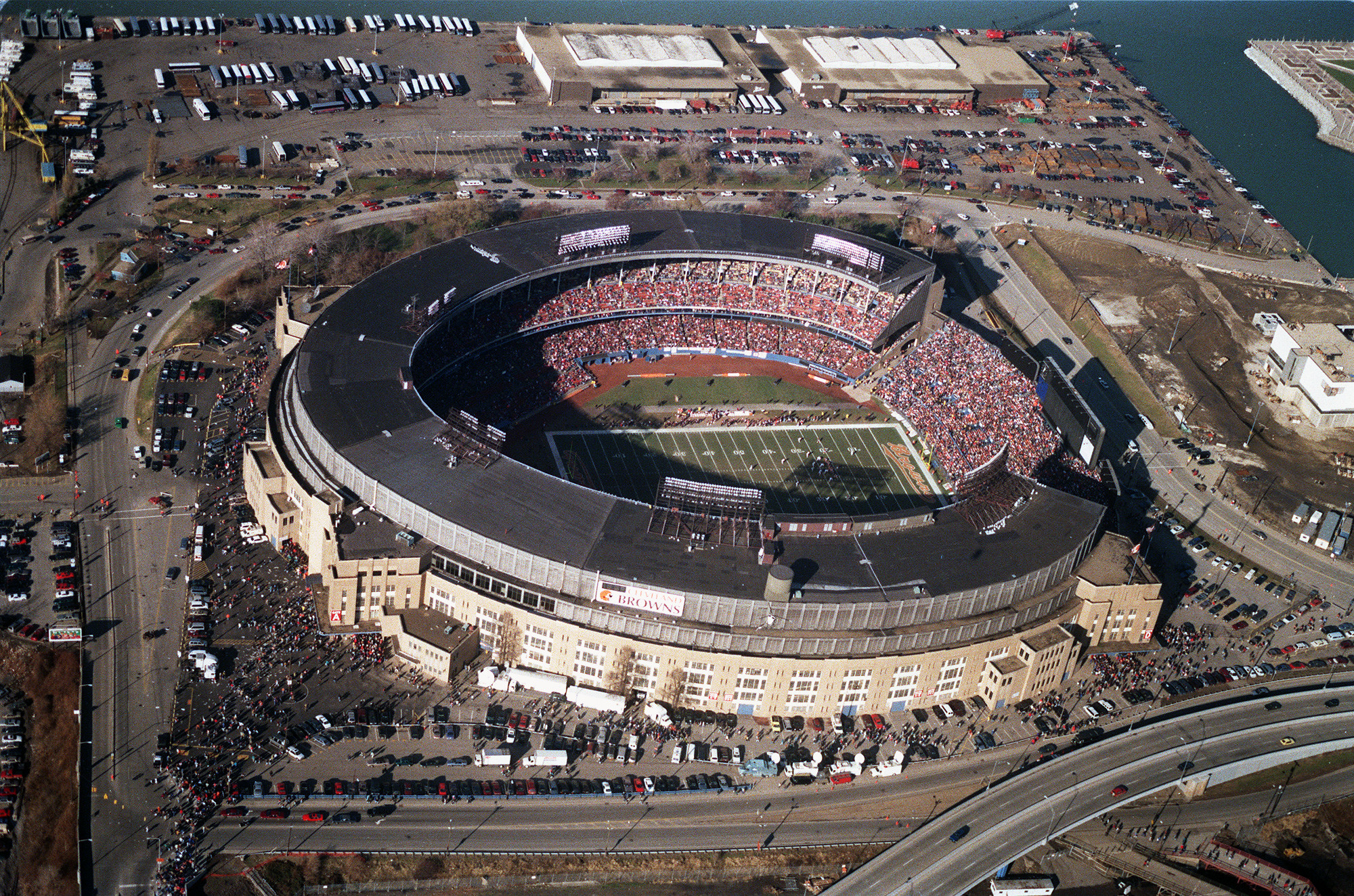
Game was played at Cleveland Stadium, home of the Browns from 1946 to 1995

- Paid attendance: 43,827
- Gross receipts (includes TV and radio): $289,126.43
- Net receipts: $263,606.07
- Total players' pool (70% of net): $184,524.25
- Winners' pool: $99,643.10 ($2,478.57 per player)
- Losers' pool: $66,428.73 ($1,585.63 per player)
- Pool for second place clubs (Eagles, Bears): $18,452.42
- Browns ownership share: $19,770.45
- Lions ownership share: $19,770.46
- League share: $39,540.91

== Legacy ==
Detroit quarterback Layne (18 for 42, passing for 177 yards) was intercepted six times, with Len Ford and Kenny Konz pulling in two each. The Browns also recovered three Detroit fumbles, with two of the recoveries leading to scores. Layne was the second quarterback to throw six interceptions in an NFL Championship Game and the first since Frank Filchock did so in the 1946 NFL Championship Game; Norm Van Brocklin would be the third (and currently last) quarterback to throw six interceptions in a championship game the following year.

The 56–10 score was the second most lopsided in the 22-year history of the event, exceeded only by the 1940 game, in which the Chicago Bears embarrassed the Washington Redskins 73–0. The 46 point margin of victory is the second highest in championship history since the NFL began the annual game in 1933. The largest margin of victory in the Super Bowl (which is the NFL Championship Game) was 45 points in Super Bowl XXIV.

The victory was the second NFL Championship win for the Browns and sixth overall.

The gross receipts for the game, including over $101,000 for radio and television rights, were just over $289,000. Each player on the winning Browns team received $2,478, while Lions players made $1,585 each.

Otto Graham's feat of passing for three touchdowns and rushing for three touchdowns in a single game wasn't repeated for 70 years until Buffalo Bills quarterback Josh Allen did the feat in 2024.
