= 1955 NFL season =

American football season

Regular season
- Duration: September 24 – December 11, 1955
- East Champions: Cleveland Browns
- West Champions: Los Angeles Rams

Championship Game
- Champions: Cleveland Browns

NFL teams: West, East

The 1955 NFL season was the 36th regular season of the National Football League. NBC paid $100,000 to replace DuMont as the national television network for the NFL Championship Game. The season ended when the Cleveland Browns defeated the Los Angeles Rams 38–14 in the title game.

== Draft ==
The 1955 NFL draft was held from January 27–28, 1955 at Philadelphia's Warwick Hotel. With the first pick, the Baltimore Colts selected running back George Shaw from the University of Oregon.

== Major rule changes ==
- The ball is dead immediately when the ball carrier touches the ground with any part of his body except his hands or feet while in the grasp of an opponent.
- A new exception is made in regard to scoring a safety: When a defender intercepts a pass, his intercepting momentum carries him into his own end zone, and he is stopped before returning the ball back into the field of play, then the ball will be next put in play at the spot of the interception.

== Division races ==
The defending champion Browns dropped their opener, at home, to the Redskins 27–17, but a six-game win streak put them back in front to win the Eastern race. The Western race was crowded a few times, as the Rams had to share the lead. In Week Eight, the Bears beat Los Angeles 24–3, to give both teams 5–3 records, The next week (November 20), the Bears took the lead with a 24–14 at Detroit while the Rams got a 17–17 tie at Baltimore. As had happened many times before in the annual battle of Chicago, the Bears were upset by the Cardinals in Week Ten (November 27), 53–14; the Rams eked out a 23–21 in Philadelphia on Les Richter's field goal with 0:07 left in the game. In Week Eleven (December 4), the Rams won 20–14 over Baltimore, and the Bears kept their hopes alive with a difficult 21–20 win over Detroit. In the latter game, the Lions' Doak Walker missed an extra point, lost a fumble late in the game on the Detroit 28, and was wide on a 35-yard field goal attempt in the final seconds. The Bears won their last game (December 11), 17–10 over Philadelphia, to finish 8–4, and hoped for the 7–3–1 Rams would lose their game in Los Angeles against Green Bay. The Rams did not lose, clinching a spot in the title game, with a 31–17 win.

Week	Western		Eastern	
1	3 teams (Bal, GB, LA)	1–0–0	3 teams (Phi, Pit, Was)	1–0–0
2	3 teams (Bal, GB, LA)	2–0–0	Washington Redskins	2–0–0
3	Tie (Bal, LA)	3–0–0	4 teams (Cards, Cle, Pit, Was)	2–1–0
4	3 teams (Bal, GB, LA)	3–1–0	Tie (Cle, Pit)	3–1–0
5	Los Angeles Rams	4–1–0	Tie (Cle, Pit)	4–1–0
6	Tie (Bal, LA)	4–2–0	Cleveland Browns	5–1–0
7	Los Angeles Rams	5–2–0	Cleveland Browns	6–1–0
8	Tie (Bears, LA)	5–3–0	Cleveland Browns	6–2–0
9	Chicago Bears	6–3–0	Cleveland Browns	7–2–0
10	Los Angeles Rams	6–3–1	Cleveland Browns	7–2–1
11	Los Angeles Rams	7–3–1	Cleveland Browns	8–2–1
12	Los Angeles Rams	8–3–1	Cleveland Browns	9–2–1

== Final standings ==
NFL Eastern Conference
	W	L	T	PCT	CONF	PF	PA	STK
Cleveland Browns	9	2	1	.818	7–2–1	349	218	W2
Washington Redskins	8	4	0	.667	6–4	246	222	W1
New York Giants	6	5	1	.545	4–5–1	267	223	W2
Philadelphia Eagles	4	7	1	.364	4–5–1	248	231	L1
Chicago Cardinals	4	7	1	.364	3–6–1	224	252	L2
Pittsburgh Steelers	4	8	0	.333	4–6	195	285	L7

Note: Tie games were not officially counted in the standings until 1972.

NFL Western Conference
	W	L	T	PCT	CONF	PF	PA	STK
Los Angeles Rams	8	3	1	.727	6–3–1	260	231	W3
Chicago Bears	8	4	0	.667	7–3	294	251	W2
Green Bay Packers	6	6	0	.500	5–5	258	276	L1
Baltimore Colts	5	6	1	.455	5–4–1	214	239	L2
San Francisco 49ers	4	8	0	.333	4–6	216	298	W1
Detroit Lions	3	9	0	.250	2–8	230	275	L2

== NFL Championship Game ==
The Cleveland Browns defeated the Los Angeles Rams 38–14 at the Los Angeles Memorial Coliseum in Los Angeles on Monday, December 26, 1955.

== League leaders ==
Statistic	Name	Team	Yards
Passing	Jim Finks	Pittsburgh	2270
Rushing	Alan Ameche	Baltimore	961
Receiving	Pete Pihos	Philadelphia	864

== Awards ==
- NEA NFL Most Valuable Player – Harlon Hill, Chicago Bears
- UPI NFL Most Valuable Player – Otto Graham, Cleveland Browns
- Sporting News NFL Player of the Year – Otto Graham, Cleveland Browns

== Coaching changes ==
- Chicago Cardinals: Joe Stydahar was replaced by Ray Richards.
- Los Angeles Rams: Hamp Pool was replaced by Sid Gillman.
- San Francisco 49ers: Buck Shaw was replaced by Red Strader.
