= Bob Kelley =

American sportscaster

Robert John Kelley (May 17, 1917 – September 9, 1966) was an American sportscaster, best known as the radio play-by-play announcer for the Rams pro football team from that NFL franchise's inception in 1937 in Cleveland and its 1947 move to Los Angeles through 1965.

Kelley was born on May 17, 1917, in Kalamazoo, Michigan. After graduation from high school, Kelley got a job announcing the football games of the Notre Dame Fighting Irish. He became director of sports for radio station WGAR in Cleveland and began calling Ram games. In 1942 he joined radio station WJR in Detroit where he broadcast the games of the Michigan Wolverines, while commuting back to Cleveland on Sundays to do the Rams' games.

In addition to broadcasting Rams games, Kelley was the regular baseball announcer for the Los Angeles Angels of the Pacific Coast League from 1948 to 1957 and the Los Angeles Angels of the American League in 1961, and had an evening sports show on radio station KMPC.

Kelley, who was known as "The Voice of the Rams", attended high school in Elkhart, Indiana, and was a 1942 graduate of Western Reserve University. He had several minor film roles, playing a sports announcer. His son Patrick, who was known as Paraquat Kelley, pursued a broadcasting career and is best known as a newscaster at KMET-FM in Los Angeles during the 1970s and '80s.

Kelley was always controversial, especially due to his nightly radio show. According to Jim Murray, the show "made as many people gnash their teeth as cheer. But they listened. His mail was sulphuric. But they wrote... Even when I didn't agree with a bloody word he said I was entertained by the way Bob Kelley said it."

Kelley suffered a heart attack at the Los Angeles Memorial Coliseum on January 12, 1964, during the 1964 Pro Bowl game. He was released from the hospital within ten days, but suffered another heart attack on August 10, 1966. He never regained consciousness, and died on September 9, two days before the Rams' first regular-season game of the year. Dick Enberg, who'd been named as Kelley's partner on Rams broadcasts that season, succeeded him as the team's lead announcer.

Bob Kelley is buried in San Fernando Mission Cemetery.
