= 1955 NFL Championship Game =

Coordinates: 34.014°N 118.287°W

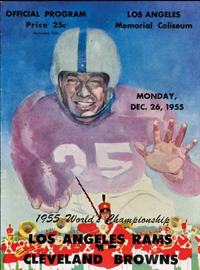
| Cleveland Browns (Eastern) (9–2–1) | Los Angeles Rams (Western) (8–3–1) |
|---|---|
| 38 | 14 |
| Head coach: Paul Brown | Head coach: Sid Gillman |
| | 1 | 2 | 3 | 4 | Total |
|---|---|---|---|---|---|
| CLE | 3 | 14 | 14 | 7 | 38 |
| LA | 0 | 7 | 0 | 7 | 14 |
- Date: December 26, 1955
- Stadium: Los Angeles Memorial Coliseum; Los Angeles, California
- Attendance: 87,695

TV in the United States
- Network: NBC
- Announcers: Bob Kelley, Ken Coleman

Location in the United States

The 1955 NFL Championship Game was the 23rd league championship game, played on December 26 at the Los Angeles Memorial Coliseum in Los Angeles, California.

It was between the Eastern Conference champion Cleveland Browns (9–2–1), the defending league champions, and the Los Angeles Rams (8–3–1), champions of the Western Conference. The attendance of 87,695 broke the NFL championship game record by nearly 30,000. This was the first NFL championship game played on a Monday and the first televised by NBC. In their sixth consecutive NFL title game, the Browns were six-point favorites.

The Browns successfully defended the title and won their third NFL championship of the 1950s in a second straight rout, 38–14. Their next (and most recent) league title was in 1964, 62 years ago.

This was the Rams' fourth title game in seven seasons, with one victory in 1951. They did not reach the league's big game again until Super Bowl XIV in January 1980, and did not win until Super Bowl XXXIV in January 2000, as the St. Louis Rams.

== Game summary ==
=== First half ===
Browns veteran Lou Groza kicked off; Rams rookie halfback Ron Waller returned the kick, and Groza himself made the tackle. A subsequent Rams drive was stopped at the Cleveland 12 when Kenny Konz intercepted a Norm Van Brocklin pass.

Browns quarterback Otto Graham, who had announced his retirement at the end of the season, drove Cleveland to the L.A. 26 where Groza's FG gave the Browns a 3–0 first quarter lead. The Browns scored again when DB Don Paul intercepted Van Brocklin's pass on the Browns 35 and raced 65 yards for a touchdown, making the score 10–0.

The Rams answered back when Van Brocklin connected with halfback Volney "Skeet" Quinlan for a 67-yard touchdown, pulling the Rams to within 3 points, 10–7, and giving the large crowd hopes of an upset. But late in the second period, Van Brocklin threw his third interception of the half; defensive back Tom James, who had been beaten on the Rams' Tom Fears' title-winning touchdown on the same field four years earlier, grabbed the errant pass and took the ball back to midfield with time running out. The next play turned a close game into a rout; Otto Graham found Dante Lavelli with a 50-yard touchdown pass along the sideline and the Rams, who moments earlier were driving to take the lead, went to the locker room down 17–7.

=== Second half ===
Graham earned his place as the star of the game. After moving the Browns from the L.A. 46, Graham kept the ball and ran around right end from the 19 and scored to put the Browns ahead 24–7. On Los Angeles's next possession, Sam Palumbo intercepted Van Brocklin at the Ram 36. Graham drove the Browns to the 4, then scored himself on a sneak. Groza's conversion increased Cleveland's lead to 31–7 with two minutes left in the third quarter.

In the final period, Graham tossed a 35-yard touchdown pass to Ray Renfro and Groza's kick gave the Browns a 38–7 lead. Late in the game, Waller ran four yards for a touchdown and Les Richter's conversion finished the scoring. In the final minutes coach Brown sent in reserve quarterback George Ratterman and allowed Graham to leave the field to an ovation from the Los Angeles crowd.

Cleveland, with its third title of the decade, represented the American/Eastern Conference in the championship game every year since its admission to the NFL, celebrated Graham's farewell. The Rams' Van Brocklin, who threw six interceptions, often was quoted that it was the worst game of his hall of fame career.

=== Scoring summary ===
Cleveland Browns 38, Los Angeles Rams 14

| Quarter | 1 | 2 | 3 | 4 | Total |
|---|---|---|---|---|---|
| Browns | 3 | 14 | 14 | 7 | 38 |
| Rams | 0 | 7 | 0 | 7 | 14 |

at Los Angeles Memorial Coliseum, Los Angeles, California

- Date: December 26, 1955
- Game time: 1 p.m. PST
- Pro-Football-Reference.com

Game information
- First quarter
  - CLE – Lou Groza 26-yard field goal. Browns 3–0
- Second quarter
  - CLE – Don Paul 65-yard interception (Groza kick). Browns 10–0
  - LA – Skeet Quinlan 67-yard pass from Norm Van Brocklin (Les Richter kick). Browns 10–7
  - CLE – Dante Lavelli 50-yard pass from Otto Graham (Groza kick). Browns 17–7
- Third quarter
  - CLE – Otto Graham 15-yard run (Groza kick). Browns 24–7
  - CLE – Otto Graham 1-yard run (Groza kick). Browns 31–7
- Fourth quarter
  - CLE – Ray Renfro 35-yard pass from Graham (Groza kick). Browns 38–7
  - LA – Ron Waller 4-yard run (Richter kick). Browns 38–14

== Officials ==
- Referee: Ronald Gibbs
- Umpire: Sam Wilson
- Linesman: Dan Tehan
- Back judge: Tay Brown
- Field judge: William McHugh
- Alternate: Emil Heintz
- Alternate: Cletus Gardner
- Alternate: James Underhill

The NFL added the fifth official, the back judge, in 1947; the line judge arrived in 1965, and the side judge in 1978.

== Players' shares ==
The gross receipts for the game, including radio and television rights, were over $504,000, the highest to date. Each player on the winning Browns team received $3,508, while Rams players made $2,316 each.
