= 1956 All-Pro Team =

Official list of the best NFL players in 1956

The 1956 All-Pro Team consisted of the best players at each position among players in the National Football League as chosen by various selectors.

The 1956 New York Giants won the NFL championship and had nine players who received first-team All-Pro honors: offensive end Kyle Rote; offensive tackle Rosey Brown; center Ray Wietecha; quarterback Charlie Conerly; halfback Frank Gifford; defensive end Andy Robustelli; defensive tackle Rosey Grier; linebacker Bill Svoboda; and defensive halfback Emlen Tunnell. Gifford also won the 1956 National Football League Most Valuable Player Award.

Consensus All-Pro players included ends Billy Howton and Harlon Hill who led the NFL with 1,188 and 1,128 receiving yards, respectively; Bobby Layne who had 1,909 passing yards and led the league with 99 points scored (including 12 field goals and 33 extra points); and fullback Rick Casares who led the league with 1,126 rushing yards.

The All-Pro selectors included:

- Associated Press (AP)
- Newspaper Enterprise Association (NEA) selected by NFL players themselves
- United Press (UP)
- The Sporting News (TSN)
- New York Daily News (NYDN) - For the 20th year, the Daily News selected an All-Pro team. Its selections were selected based on votes "by the top football writers in every league city."

Players receiving first-team honors from three of the four selectors are shown in bold.

== Offense ==
=== Ends ===
- **Harlon Hill**, Chicago Bears (AP-1, NEA-1, UP-1, TSN, NYDN-1)
- **Billy Howton**, Green Back Packers (AP-1, NEA-1, UP-1, TSN, NYDN-1)
- Billy Wilson, San Francisco 49ers (AP-2, NEA-2, UP-2)
- Kyle Rote, New York Giants (AP-2, UP-2, TSN, NYDN-2)
- Johnny Carson, Washington Redskins (TSN)
- Darrel Brewster, Cleveland Browns (NEA-2)
- Elroy Hirsch, Los Angeles Rams (NYDN-2) [PFHOF]

=== Tackles ===
- **Rosey Brown**, New York Giants (AP-1, NEA-1, UP-1, TSN, NYDN-1) [PFHOF]
- **Lou Creekmur**, Detroit Lions (AP-1, UP-1, TSN, NYDN-2) [PFHOF]
- Bill Wightkin, Chicago Bears (NEA-2, UP-2, TSN, NYDN-1)
- Bob St. Clair, San Francisco 49ers (NEA-1) [PFHOF]
- Lou Groza, Cleveland Browns (AP-2, UP-2, NYDN-2) [PFHOF]
- Don Boll, Washington Redskins (AP-2)
- Mike McCormack, Cleveland Browns (TSN, NEA-2) [PFHOF]
- Bob Miller, Detroit Lions (TSN)

=== Guards ===
- **Dick Stanfel**, Washington Redskins (AP-1, NEA-1, UP-1, TSN, NYDN-2) [PFHOF]
- **Stan Jones**, Chicago Bears (AP-1, NEA-2, UP-1, TSN, NYDN-1) [PFHOF]
- **Duane Putnam**, Los Angeles Rams (AP-2, NEA-1, UP-2, TSN, NYDN-1)
- Red Stephens, Washington Redskins (TSN)
- Herman Clark, Chicago Bears (AP-2, NYDN-2)
- Jack Stroud, New York Giants (UP-2)
- Harley Sewell, Detroit Lions (NEA-2)

=== Centers ===
- **Larry Strickland**, Chicago Bears (AP-1, NEA-2, UP-2, TSN, NYDN-1)
- Charlie Ane Jr., Detroit Lions (AP-2, NEA-1, UP-1)
- Ray Wietecha, New York Giants (TSN, NYDN-2)

=== Quarterbacks ===
- **Bobby Layne**, Detroit Lions (AP-1, NEA-1, UP-1, TSN, NYDN-1) [PFHOF]
- Tobin Rote, Green Bay Packers (AP-2, NEA-2, UP-2, TSN, NYDN-2)
- Charlie Conerly, New York Giants (TSN)

=== Halfbacks ===
- **Frank Gifford**, New York Giants (AP-1, NEA-1, UP-1, TSN, NYDN-1) [PFHOF]
- **Ollie Matson**, Chicago Cardinals (AP-1, NEA-1, UP-1, TSN, NYDN-1) [PFHOF]
- Hugh McElhenny, San Francisco 49ers (AP-2, NEA-2, UP-2, TSN, NYDN-2) [PFHOF]
- Alex Webster, New York Giants (AP-2)
- Preston Carpenter, Cleveland Browns (UP-2)
- Ron Waller, Los Angeles Rams (NEA-2)
- Lenny Moore, Baltimore Colts (NYDN-2) [PFHOF]

=== Fullbacks ===
- **Rick Casares**, Chicago Bears (AP-1, NEA-1, UP-1, TSN, NYDN-1)
- Alan Ameche, Baltimore Colts (AP-2, NEA-2, TSN, NYDN-2)
- Johnny Olszewski, Chicago Cardinals (TSN)
- Leon Hart, Detroit Lions (UP-2)

== Defense ==
=== Defensive ends ===
- **Gene Brito**, Washington Redskins (AP-1, NEA-1, UP-1, TSN, NYDN-1)
- **Andy Robustelli**, New York Giants (AP-1, NEA-2, UP-1, TSN, NYDN-1) [PFHOF]
- Gino Marchetti, Baltimore Colts (AP-2, NEA-1, UP-2, TSN, NYDN-2) [PFHOF]
- John Martinkovic, Green Bay Packers (TSN)
- Ed Meadows, Chicago Bears (AP-2)
- Bob Gain, Cleveland Browns (UP-2)
- Tom Scott, Philadelphia Eagles (NEA-2)
- Len Ford, Cleveland Browns (NYDN-2) [PFHOF]

=== Defensive tackles ===
- **Rosey Grier**, New York Giants (AP-1, NEA-2, UP-1, TSN, NYDN-1)
- **Art Donovan**, Baltimore Colts (AP-1, NEA-1, UP-2, TSN, NYDN-2) [PFHOF]
- Ernie Stautner, Pittsburgh Steelers (AP-2, NEA-1, UP-1) [PFHOF]
- Ray Krouse, Detroit Lions (TSN, NYDN-1)
- Don Colo, Cleveland Browns (AP-2, UP-2)
- Bud McFadin, Los Angeles Rams (NEA-2, NYDN-2)

=== Middle guards ===
- **Bill George**, Chicago Bears (AP-1, NEA-1, UP-1, TSN) [PFHOF]
- Dale Dodrill, Pittsburgh Steelers (NEA-2, UP-2, NYDN-2)

=== Linebackers ===
- **Joe Schmidt**, Detroit Lions (AP-1, NEA-1, UP-1, TSN, NYDN-1) [PFHOF]
- **Chuck Bednarik**, Philadelphia Eagles (AP-2, NEA-1, UP-1, NYDN-1) [PFHOF]
- **Les Richter**, Los Angeles Rams (AP-1, TSN, NYDN-1 [guard]) [PFHOF]
- Chuck Drazenovich, Washington Redskins (AP-2 [middle guard], NEA-2, UP-2, TSN)
- Bill Svoboda, New York Giants (AP-2, UP-2, TSN, NYDN-2)
- Roger Zatkoff, Green Bay Packers (NEA-2, NYDN-2)

=== Defensive halfbacks ===
- **Night Train Lane**, Chicago Cardinals (AP-1, NEA-1, UP-1, TSN, NYDN-1) [PFHOF]
- **Emlen Tunnell**, New York Giants (AP-1 [safety], NEA-1, UP-1, NYDN-2) [PFHOF]
- Jim David, Detroit Lions (AP-2, NEA-2, UP-2, NYDN-2 [safety])
- J. C. Caroline, Chicago Bears (UP-2, NYDN-1)
- Warren Lahr, Cleveland Browns (TSN)

=== Safeties ===
- **Jack Christiansen**, Detroit Lions (AP-1 [halfback], NEA-1, UP-1, TSN, NYDN-1) [PFHOF]
- **Bobby Dillon**, Green Bay Packers (AP-2 [halfback], NEA-1, UP-1, TSN, NYDN-1) [PFHOF]
- Yale Lary, Detroit Lions (AP-1, NEA-2, UP-2, TSN, NYDN-2 [halfback]) [PFHOF]
- Jack Butler, Pittsburgh Steelers (AP-2, NEA-2 [def halfback], TSN) [PFHOF]
- Lindon Crow, Chicago Cardinals (AP-2)
- Ken Konz, Chicago Bears (UP-2, TSN)
- Dicky Moegle, San Francisco 49ers (TSN)
- Will Sherman, Los Angeles Rams (NEA-2)
- Ray Gene Smith, Chicago Bears (NYDN-2)
