= 1955 All-Pro Team =

Official list of the best NFL players in 1955

The 1955 All-Pro Team consisted of the best players at each position among players in the National Football League as chosen by various selectors.

The 1955 Cleveland Browns won the NFL championship. Eight Cleveland players received first-team honors from at least one of the All-Pro selectors. Cleveland's first-team honorees were: offensive tackles Lou Groza and Mike McCormack; guard Abe Gibron; center Frank Gatski; quarterback Otto Graham; defensive end Len Ford; defensive tackle Don Colo; and defensive back Don Paul.

Other notable honorees included Alan Ameche who led the NFL with 961 rushing yards, Pete Pihos who led the league with 864 receiving yards, and Will Sherman who led the league with 11 interceptions.

The All-Pro selectors included:

- Associated Press (AP)
- Newspaper Enterprise Association (NEA) selected based on ballots from 396 NFL players
- United Press (UP)
- The Sporting News (TSN) picked a single team of 33 players, "the first honest-to-goodness working-order dream team of 33 -- the way the pros play it"
- New York Daily News (NYDN) - For the 19th year, the Daily News selected an All-Pro team. Its selections were selected based on votes by "the top football writers in the country."

Players receiving first-team honors from three of the five selectors are shown in bold.

== Offense ==
=== Ends ===
- **Harlon Hill**, Chicago Bears (AP-1, NEA-1, UP-1, TSN, NYDN-1)
- **Billy Wilson**, San Francisco 49ers (NEA-1, UP-1, TSN, NYDN-1)
- Pete Pihos, Philadelphia Eagles (AP-1, UP-2, NEA-2, TSN, NYDN-2)
- Kyle Rote, New York Giants (UP-2 TSN)
- Billy Howton, Green Bay Packers (NEA-2, NYDN-2)

=== Tackles ===
- **Lou Groza**, Cleveland Browns (AP-1, NEA-1, UP-1, TSN, NYDN-1)
- Bob St. Clair, San Francisco 49ers (NEA-1, UP-1, NYDN-2)
- Bill Wightkin, Chicago Bears (AP-1)
- Mike McCormack, Cleveland Browns (NEA-2, UP-2, TSN, NYDN-1)
- Jack Jennings, Chicago Cardinals (TSN)
- Lou Creekmur, Detroit Lions (UP-2, NYDN-2)
- Ken Snyder, Philadelphia (NEA-2)

=== Guards ===
- **Abe Gibron**, Cleveland Rams (NEA-1, UP-1, NYDN-1)
- **Duane Putnam**, Los Angeles Rams (AP-1, NEA-1, UP-2, TSN, NYDN-1)
- Stan Jones, Chicago Bears (AP-1, NEA-2, UP-2, TSN, NYDN-2)
- Bill Austin, New York Giants (UP-1, NYDN-2)
- Herman Clark, Chicago Bears (TSN)
- Harley Sewell, Detroit Lions (NEA-2)

=== Centers ===
- **Frank Gatski**, Cleveland Browns (AP-1, NEA-1, UP-1, TSN, NYDN-1)
- Dick Szymanski, Baltimore Colts (UP-2, NYDN-2)
- Bill Johnson, San Francisco 49ers (NEA-2)

=== Quarterbacks ===
- **Otto Graham**, Cleveland Browns (AP-1, NEA-2, UP-1, TSN, NYDN-1)
- Tobin Rote, Green Bay Packers (NEA-1, TSN, NYDN-2)
- Norm Van Brocklin, Los Angeles Rams (UP-2, TSN)

=== Halfbacks ===
- **Ollie Matson**, Chicago Cardinals (AP-1, NEA-1, UP-1, TSN, NYDN-1)
- **Frank Gifford**, New York Giants (AP-1, NEA-1, TSN)
- Ron Waller, Los Angeles Rams (UP-1)
- Rick Casares, Chicago Bears (NYDN-1)
- Doak Walker, Detroit Lions (NEA-2, TSN, NYDN-2)
- Alex Webster, New York Giants (UP-2, NYDN-2)
- Curly Morrison, Cleveland Browns (TSN)
- Ray Renfro, Cleveland Browns (NEA-2)
- Fred Morrison, Cleveland Browns (UP-2)

=== Fullbacks ===
- **Alan Ameche**, Baltimore Colts (AP-1, NEA-2, UP-1, TSN, NYDN-1)
- Howie Ferguson, Green Bay Packers (NEA-1, UP-2, TSN, NYDN-2)

== Defense ==
=== Defensive ends ===
- **Gene Brito**, Washington Redskins (AP-1, NEA-1, UP-1, NYDN-2)
- **Len Ford**, Cleveland Browns (NEA-1, UP-1, NYDN-1)
- Andy Robustelli, Los Angeles Rams (AP-1, NYDN-1, NEA-2, UP-2, TSN)
- Gino Marchetti, Baltimore Colts (NEA-2, NYDN-2)
- Tom Scott, Philadelphia Eagles (TSN)
- Norm Willey, Philadelphia Eagles (UP-2)

=== Defensive tackles ===
- **Art Donovan**, Baltimore Colts (AP-1, NEA-1, UP-1, TSN, NYDN-1)
- Bob Toneff, San Francisco 49ers (AP-1, NYDN-1, NEA-2, UP-2, TSN)
- Don Colo, Cleveland Browns (NEA-1, UP-1, NYDN-2)
- Bud McFadin, Los Angeles Rams (NEA-2)
- Ray Krouse, New York Giants (UP-2, NYDN-2 [middle guard])
- Ernie Stautner, Pittsburgh Steelers (TSN, NYDN-2)

=== Middle guards ===
- **Dale Dodrill**, Pittsburgh Steelers (NEA-1, UP-1, TSN, NYDN-1)
- Bill George, Chicago Bears (AP-1, NEA-2)
- Bob Gain, Cleveland Rams (UP-2)

=== Linebackers ===
- **George Connor**, Chicago Bears (NEA-1, UP-1, NYDN-1)
- Joe Schmidt (AP-1, NEA-1, UP-2)
- Roger Zatkoff, Green Bay Packers (AP-1, NEA-2, TSN, NYDN-2)
- Chuck Bednarik, Philadelphia Eagles (UP-1, NYDN-2)
- Les Richter, Los Angeles Rams (NYDN-1, UP-2)
- LaVern Torgeson, Washington Redskins (TSN, NEA-2)
- Wayne Robinson, Philadelphia Eagles (TSN)

=== Defensive halfbacks ===
- **Will Sherman**, Los Angeles Rams (AP-1, NEA-1, UP-1, TSN [safety], NYDN-1 [safety])
- Bert Rechichar, Baltimore Colts (NYDN-1, UP-2)
- Don Paul, Cleveland Browns (UP-1)
- Warren Lahr, Cleveland Browns (NEA-2, UP-2, NYDN-2)
- Jim David, Detroit Lions (NEA-2)
- Dick Alban, Washington Redskins (TSN)
- Tom Landry, New York Giants (NYDN-2)

=== Safeties ===
- **Jack Christiansen**, Detroit Lions (AP-1, NEA-1, UP-1, TSN, NYDN-1 [halfback])
- **Bobby Dillon**, Green Bay Packers (AP-1 [def halfback], NEA-1, UP-1, TSN [def halfback], NYDN-1)
- Emlen Tunnell, New York Giants (AP-1, NEA-2, UP-2, TSN, NYDN-2)
- Night Train Lane, Chicago Cardinals (UP-2, NYDN-2)
- Rex Berry, San Francisco (NEA-2)
