= 1958 All-Pro Team =

Official list of the best NFL players in 1958

The Associated Press (AP), Newspaper Enterprise Association (NEA), New York Daily News (NYDN), The Sporting News (SN), and United Press International (UPI) selected All-Pro teams comprising their selections of the best players at each position in the National Football League (NFL) during the 1958 NFL season.

== Offensive selections ==
=== Quarterbacks ===
- Johnny Unitas, Baltimore Colts (AP)
- Bobby Layne, Pittsburgh Steelers (AP-2)

=== Halfbacks ===
- Lenny Moore, Baltimore Colts (AP)
- Jon Arnett, Los Angeles Rams (AP)
- Frank Gifford, New York Giants (AP-2)
- Willie Galimore, Chicago Bears (AP-2)

=== Fullbacks ===
- Jim Brown, Cleveland Browns (AP)
- Alan Ameche, Baltimore Colts (AP-2)

=== Ends ===
- Raymond Berry, Baltimore Colts (AP)
- Del Shofner, Los Angeles Rams (AP)
- Jimmy Orr, Pittsburgh Steelers (AP-2)
- Pete Retzlaff, Philadelphia Eagles (AP-2)

=== Tackles ===
- Rosey Brown, New York Giants (AP)
- Jim Parker, Baltimore Colts (AP)
- Mike McCormack, Cleveland Browns (AP-2)
- Bob St. Clair, San Francisco 49ers (AP-2)

=== Guards ===
- Dick Stanfel, Washington Redskins (AP)
- Duane Putnam, Los Angeles Rams (AP)
- Jim Ray Smith, Cleveland Browns (AP-2)
- Art Spinney, Baltimore Colts (AP-2)

=== Centers ===
- Ray Wietecha, New York Giants (AP)
- Jim Ringo, Green Bay Packers (AP-2)

== Defensive selections ==
=== Defensive ends ===
- Gino Marchetti, Baltimore Colts (AP)
- Andy Robustelli, New York Giants (AP)
- Doug Atkins, Chicago Bears (AP-2)
- Gene Brito, Washington Redskins (AP-2)

=== Defensive tackles ===
- Gene Lipscomb, Baltimore Colts (AP)
- Ernie Stautner, Pittsburgh Steelers (AP)
- Art Donovan, Baltimore Colts (AP-2)
- Rosey Grier, New York Giants (AP-2)

=== Middle guards ===
- Bill George, Chicago Bears (AP)
- Chuck Drazenovich, Washington Redskins (AP-2)

=== Linebackers ===
- Sam Huff, New York Giants (AP)
- Joe Schmidt, Detroit Lions (AP)
- Walt Michaels, Cleveland Browns (AP-2)
- Les Richter, Los Angeles Rams (AP-2)

=== Defensive backs ===
- Jack Butler, Pittsburgh Steelers (AP)
- Yale Lary, Detroit Lions (AP)
- Jim Patton, New York Giants (AP)
- Bobby Dillon, Green Bay Packers (AP)
- Andy Nelson, Baltimore Colts (AP-2)
- Will Sherman, Los Angeles Rams (AP-2)
- Carl Taseff, Baltimore Colts (AP-2)
- Night Train Lane, Chicago Cardinals (AP-2)
