= Night Train Lane =

American football player (1928–2002)

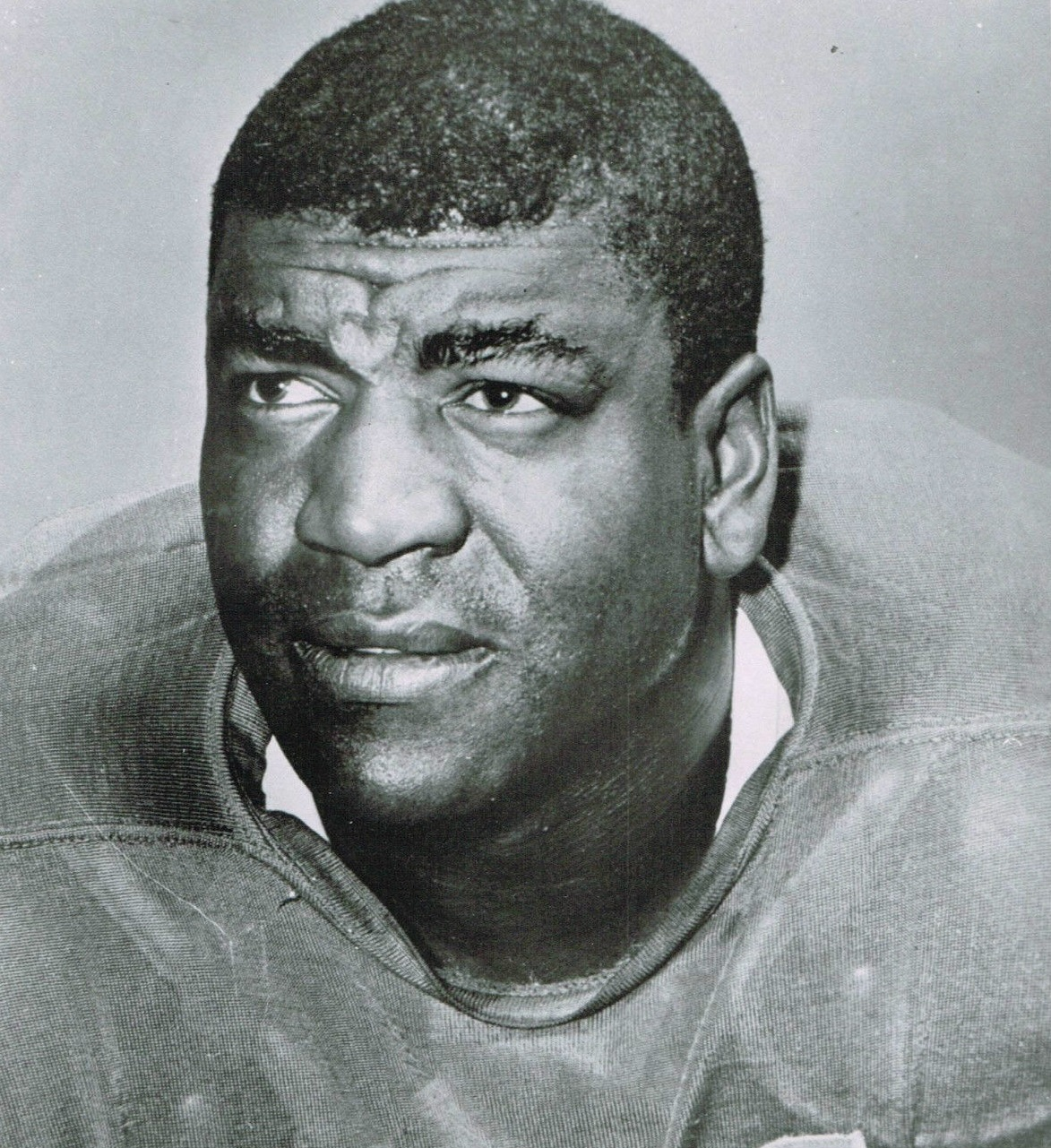
- Lane with the Detroit Lions in 1962

No. 81
- Position: Cornerback

Personal information
- Born: April 16, 1928; Austin, Texas, U.S.
- Died: January 29, 2002 (aged 73); Austin, Texas, U.S.
- Listed height: 6 ft 1 in (1.85 m)
- Listed weight: 194 lb (88 kg)

Career information
- High school: L. C. Anderson (Austin)
- College: Scottsbluff (1947)
- NFL draft: 1952: undrafted

Career history
- Los Angeles Rams (1952–1953); Chicago Cardinals (1954–1959); Detroit Lions (1960–1965)

Awards and highlights
- 7× First-team All-Pro (1956, 1957, 1959–1963); 3× Second-team All-Pro (1954, 1958, 1963); 7× Pro Bowl (1954–1956, 1958, 1960–1962); 2× NFL interceptions leader (1952, 1954); NFL 1950s All-Decade Team; NFL 50th Anniversary All-Time Team; NFL 75th Anniversary All-Time Team; NFL 100th Anniversary All-Time Team; Arizona Cardinals Ring of Honor; Pride of the Lions; Detroit Lions 75th Anniversary Team; Detroit Lions All-Time Team; NFL record: Most interceptions in a season: 14 (1952) (Note: This is also the record for most interceptions in a rookie season.)

Career NFL statistics
- Interceptions: 68
- Interception yards: 1,207
- Fumble recoveries: 11
- Safeties: 1
- Defensive touchdowns: 7
- Stats at Pro Football Reference
- Pro Football Hall of Fame

Richard "Dick" Lane (April 16, 1928 – January 29, 2002), commonly known as "Night Train" Lane, was an American professional football cornerback who played for 14 years in the National Football League (NFL). He played for the Los Angeles Rams (1952–1953), the Chicago Cardinals (1954–1959), and the Detroit Lions (1960–1965).

As a rookie in 1952, Lane had 14 interceptions, a mark that remains an NFL record over 70 years later. He played in the Pro Bowl seven times and was selected as a first-team All-Pro player seven times between 1956 and 1963. His 68 career interceptions ranked second in NFL history at the time of his retirement and still ranks fourth in NFL history. He was also known as one of the most ferocious tacklers in NFL history and was inducted into the Pro Football Hall of Fame in 1974. He was named to the National Football League 50th Anniversary All-Time Team in 1969, named to the 75th Anniversary All-Time Team in 1994 and unanimously named to the National Football League 100th Anniversary All-Time Team in 2019. In 1999, he was ranked number 20 on The Sporting News' list of the 100 Greatest Football Players.

After retiring from professional football, Lane worked for the Detroit Lions in various administrative positions from 1966 to 1972 and then held assistant coaching positions at Southern University (1972) and Central State University (1973). For 17 years, from 1975 to 1992, he was in charge of Detroit's Police Athletic League.

== Early career ==
=== Youth ===
Lane was born in Austin, Texas, in April 1928. When he was three months old, he was abandoned by his birth parents, a prostitute and pimp. He was found, covered in newspapers, in a trash bin. Lane later recalled, "My father was called Texas Slim. I never saw him—I don't know if he's the one that told my mother to throw me away. A pimp told my mother I had to go. They put me in a trash can and took off. Some people heard me crying. They thought it was a cat."

Lane was adopted and raised by Ella Lane, who also had four other children. As a youth in Austin, Lane grew up poor, busing tables at local hotels and shining shoes on Congress Avenue. He also helped his mother with a laundry business she ran out of the home. Lane became known as "Cue Ball" and later recalled how he acquired the nickname: "I was in a pool hall in 12th street. We were playing for money, maybe a dime. As soon as I made the eight ball, the other guy took off running. He didn't want to pay. I grabbed that cue ball and just as he made the corner I threw it and hit him upside the head. The guy didn't know what had hit him."

=== Anderson High School ===
Lane attended L.C. Anderson High School, Austin's segregated high school for African Americans. He played basketball and football and was a member of the school's 1945 and 1946 football teams. The 1945 team was runner-up in the Prairie View Interscholastic League, an association of black schools in Texas.

=== Negro league baseball ===
After graduating from high school, Lane lived for a time in Council Bluffs, Iowa, with his birth mother, Etta Mae King. She had visited during Lane's youth, and the two reconciled. His mother and a man had opened a tavern in Council Bluffs. While in Council Bluffs, a baseball scout signed Lane, and he played for a time with the Negro league Omaha Rockets, a farm team for the Kansas City Monarchs.

=== Scottsbluff Junior College ===
In the fall of 1947, Lane enrolled at Scottsbluff Junior College in Scottsbluff, Nebraska. He played one season of college football at Scottsbluff. He was the only African American player on the team, and a clipping from the college newspaper noted, "He is outstanding for his vicious tackles, hard running and pass snatching." The Scottsbluff football team compiled a 5–3–1 record with Lane in the lineup in 1947 and finished in third place in the Nebraska Junior College Conference.

=== Military service ===
In 1948, Lane enlisted in the United States Army and served for four years. He served at Fort Ord on Monterey Bay in California and played on a Fort Ord football team. In 1951, he caught 18 touchdown passes for Fort Ord. He received second-team All-Army honors in 1949 and first-team honors in 1951. After his discharge from the Army, Lane worked in an aircraft plant in Los Angeles, lifting heavy sheets of metal out of a bin and placing them into a press.

== Professional career ==
=== Los Angeles Rams ===
==== Signing and nickname ====
While working at the aircraft plant in Los Angeles, Lane passed the Los Angeles Rams offices on his bus ride to work. He walked into the office with a scrapbook of clippings in 1952 and asked for a tryout. He was recommended to the Rams by Gabby Sims and signed as a free agent. Lane initially tried out as a receiver, the position he had played at Fort Ord, but was switched to a defensive back by the Rams. In the Rams' first scrimmage on August 3, 1952, Lane drew praise as "the outstanding player in the scrimmage by a country mile" due to his "ferocious" approach to the game and his speed in chasing down Elroy Hirsch. After the scrimmage, Rams head coach Joe Stydahar said, "Lane came out here to make the ball club. Well, last night he got himself a job."

Lane acquired the nickname "Night Train" during his first training camp with the Rams. Teammate Tom Fears had a record player in his room and frequently played the record, "Night Train", by Jimmy Forrest. The record was released in March 1952 and was the #1 R&B hit for seven weeks. According to an account published by the Los Angeles Times in August 1952, "Whenever Fears plays it Lane can be found in the hall outside Tom's room dancing to the music." Lane was initially uncomfortable with the racial implication of the nickname, which had been bestowed on him by his white teammates, but he embraced it after a newspaper reported on his performance against Washington Redskins star Choo Choo Justice with the headline, "Night Train Derails Choo Choo".

==== 1952 season ====
As a rookie in 1952, Lane appeared in all 12 regular season games and broke the NFL single-season record with 14 interceptions. He also led the league with 298 interception return yards and two interceptions returned for touchdowns. In his first NFL game, a 37–7 loss to the Cleveland Browns, Lane was credited by the Los Angeles Times with playing "a positively sensational game at defensive halfback (he made about 50% of the tackles)." On December 7, 1952, he intercepted three passes in a 45–27 victory over the Green Bay Packers, including an 80-yard return of a pass from Tobin Rote. The following week, he intercepted three more passes in a 28–14 victory over the Pittsburgh Steelers, including one that he returned 42 yards for a touchdown. However, he sprained an ankle after making his third interception against the Steelers and was lost to the Rams for their playoff game against the Detroit Lions. The NFL later prepared a list of the greatest single-season performances of all time and ranked Lane's 1952 season fourth on that list.

==== 1953 season ====
After Lane blocked two field-goal attempts during a July 1953 scrimmage, Rams coach Hamp Pool said, "Night Train has the reflexes of a cat. It just doesn't seem possible that a man can come in from so far out and get in front of the ball in a matter of a couple of seconds." During the 1953 season, Lane appeared in 11 games for the Rams, but he intercepted only three passes. The highlight of his 1953 season was a blocked field goal against the Green Bay Packers; Lane blocked the kick at the Rams' 25-yards line, caught it on the bounce 45 yards downfield, and returned it for a touchdown.

=== Chicago Cardinals ===
Lane had signed with the Rams for $4,500. After the two seasons he had with the Rams, he was offered a $2,500 salary increase. He then said it wasn't enough money in his view and that they should trade him. Not long after, in January 1954, the Rams traded Lane to the Chicago Cardinals in a three-team deal that also involved Don Doll. During the 1954 season, Lane appeared in all 12 regular season games for the Cardinals and again led the NFL in both interceptions (10) and interception return yards (181). Lane was occasionally used as a receiver by the Cardinals, and on November 13, 1955, he caught a pass from Ogden Compton, a play that covered 98 yards, the second longest pass in NFL history up to that time.

Lane remained with the Cardinals for six seasons from 1954 through 1959, appearing in 68 games and intercepting 30 passes. During his years with the Cardinals, Lane received All-NFL honors in 1954 (AP and UPI second team), 1955 (UPI second team), 1956 (AP and UPI first team), 1957 (Sporting News first team), 1958 (AP second team), 1959 (NEA first team). He was also invited to play in the Pro Bowl in 1954, 1955, 1956, and 1958.

=== Detroit Lions ===
On August 22, 1960, the Cardinals traded Lane to the Detroit Lions in exchange for lineman Gerry Perry. Lions great Joe Schmidt later called it "one of the greatest trades that will ever be made in any sport." At the time of the trade, Lions head coach George Wilson noted: "He has a reputation as a gambler. We are aware of that but he still has speed and experience."

In the Lions' first win of the 1960 season, a 30–17 victory over the Baltimore Colts, Lane intercepted a Johnny Unitas pass and returned it 80 yards for a touchdown, quickly becoming a fan favorite in Detroit. In his first two seasons with the Lions, Lane intercepted 11 passes for 175 return yards. In all, Lane played six seasons with the Lions from 1960 to 1965, appearing in 66 games with 21 interceptions for 272 yards. During his time with the Lions, Lane received All-NFL honors in 1960 (UPI, NEA, and Sporting News first team), 1961 (AP, NEA, and Sporting News first team), 1962 (AP, UPI, Sporting News, and NEA first team), 1963 (UPI and Sporting News first team). He was also invited to play in the Pro Bowl in 1960, 1961, and 1962.

Lane appeared in the 1962 Pro Bowl despite suffering from appendicitis. Weakened and in pain, he blocked an extra point kick and intercepted a Y. A. Tittle pass and returned it 42 yards for the West All-Stars. He checked into a Los Angeles hospital the next day and had his appendix removed.

In early July 1963, Lane married jazz singer Dinah Washington and began serving as her business manager, leading to reports that he might not continue his football career. However, he signed a contract with the Lions in late July. Lane intercepted five passes and recovered two fumbles in 14 games for the 1963 Lions.

Lane was hampered by injuries after the 1963 season. In August 1964, he was injured in a pre-season game, had surgery on his knee, and was out of action for the first part of the 1964 season. Lane ultimately appeared in seven games for the 1964 Lions, managing only one interception, the lowest total of his career up to that point.

On September 7, 1965, after undergoing off-season knee surgery, Lane, at age 37, was released by the Lions. When no other team claimed him, Lane returned to the Lions as a taxi squad player. He was returned to the active lineup on October 20, 1965, appearing in seven games with no interceptions for the first time in his career.

=== Ferocious tackler ===
Lane was known as a ferocious tackler, and his style of play led to changes in the rules of the game. In 1961, he tackled Jon Arnett by the face mask as he ran at full speed down the field. Arnett lay motionless on the field after the tackle, and the play left a lasting impression. The following year, the NFL adopted a rule prohibiting the grasping of an opponent's face mask.

Lane's practice of tackling opponents about the head and neck, which was then a legal technique, was sometimes called a "Night Train Necktie". It later became known as a clothesline tackle and prohibited. He later explained the rationale for his practice of necktie tackling:

My object is to stop the guy before he gains another inch. ... [I]f I hit them in the legs they may fall forward for a first down. ... I grab them around the neck so I can go back to the bench and sit down.

In 2009, a film produced by the NFL ranked Lane No. 2 on its list (behind Dick Butkus) of the most feared tacklers in league history. The film also credited Lane's practices with the prohibition of clothesline tackles.

In the book Paper Lion by George Plimpton, former Detroit Lions assistant coach Aldo Forte recalled a hit that Lane placed on then New York Giants quarterback Y. A. Tittle in 1962 that literally "knocked the plays out of his head", rendering the quarterback unable to remember any of the Giants' plays until after halftime.

=== Career accomplishments and honors ===
During his 14 years in the NFL, Lane recorded 68 interceptions, 1,207 interception return yards, and five touchdowns on interception. He also recovered 11 fumbles, returning them for 57 yards and one touchdown. From 1954 to 1963, he was selected as a first-team All-NFL player seven times and played in seven Pro Bowls. His single-season record of 14 interceptions still stands despite the lengthening of the NFL season from 12 to 14 to 16 and eventually 17 games. Lane's 68 career interceptions ranked second in NFL history at the time of his retirement(The Giants' Emlen Tunnell had more, with 79) and still ranks fourth in NFL history as of the end of the 2023-24 NFL season. His 1,207 interception return yards also ranked second in NFL history when he retired(Also behind Tunnell, who had 1,282) and still ranks sixth in NFL history. His 298 interception return yards in 1952 was three yards short of the NFL record at the time(The Lions' Don Doll, who had 301 return yards in 1949) and remains the seventh best single-season total in NFL history.

Lane has received numerous honors for his contributions to the sport. His honors include the following:

- In September 1969, Lane was one of 16 players named to the all-time All-Pro team selected by the Pro Football Hall of Fame. He was also named to the NFL's 1950s All-Decade Team in August 1969.
- In February 1974, Lane was named to the Pro Football Hall of Fame. At the induction ceremony in July 1974, Lane was introduced by his high school coach W. E. Pigford. In his speech, Lane spoke out against the NFL's treatment of African Americans as "stepchildren" and added, "I hope the black players will band together to deal with the problem of no black coaches, no black managers and few black quarterbacks in pro football."
- In January 1988, Lane was named to the Michigan Sports Hall of Fame. At the time, he said, "I was feeling a little put out about having to wait more than 10 years after getting into the pro Hall of Fame to get into the state, but I'm happy that I'm finally in."
- In August 1994, he was named to the National Football League 75th Anniversary All-Time Team selected by a 15-person panel of NFL and Pro Football Hall of Fame officials, former players, and media representatives. He was the only former Detroit Lions player so honored.
- In August 1999, Lane was ranked number 20 on The Sporting News' list of the 100 Greatest Football Players, making him the highest-ranked defensive back, the Cardinals' highest-ranked player and the Lions' second highest-ranked player after Barry Sanders.
- In 2001, Lane was inducted into the Texas Sports Hall of Fame.
- In August 2006, Lane became one of eight charter inductees into the Arizona Cardinals' Ring of Honor.
- In 2020, Lane was named to the NFL's 100th Anniversary All-Time Team.

== NFL career statistics ==
Legend
| | Led the league |
| | NFL record |
| **Bold** | Career high |

| General | | | Interceptions | | | |
| Year | Team | GP | Int | Yds | TD | Lng |
|---|---|---|---|---|---|---|
| 1952 | LAR | 12 | **14** | **298** | **2** | 80 |
| 1953 | LAR | 11 | 3 | 9 | 0 | 8 |
| 1954 | CHC | 12 | 10 | 181 | 0 | 64 |
| 1955 | CHC | 12 | 6 | 69 | 0 | 26 |
| 1956 | CHC | 12 | 7 | 206 | 1 | 66 |
| 1957 | CHC | 8 | 2 | 47 | 0 | 33 |
| 1958 | CHC | 12 | 2 | 0 | 0 | 0 |
| 1959 | CHC | 12 | 3 | 125 | 1 | 69 |
| 1960 | DET | 12 | 5 | 102 | 1 | **80** |
| 1961 | DET | 12 | 6 | 73 | 0 | 32 |
| 1962 | DET | 14 | 4 | 16 | 0 | 13 |
| 1963 | DET | 14 | 5 | 70 | 0 | 33 |
| 1964 | DET | 7 | 1 | 11 | 0 | 11 |
| 1965 | DET | 7 | — | — | — | — |
| Career | | 157 | 68 | 1,207 | 5 | 80 |

== Post-NFL career ==
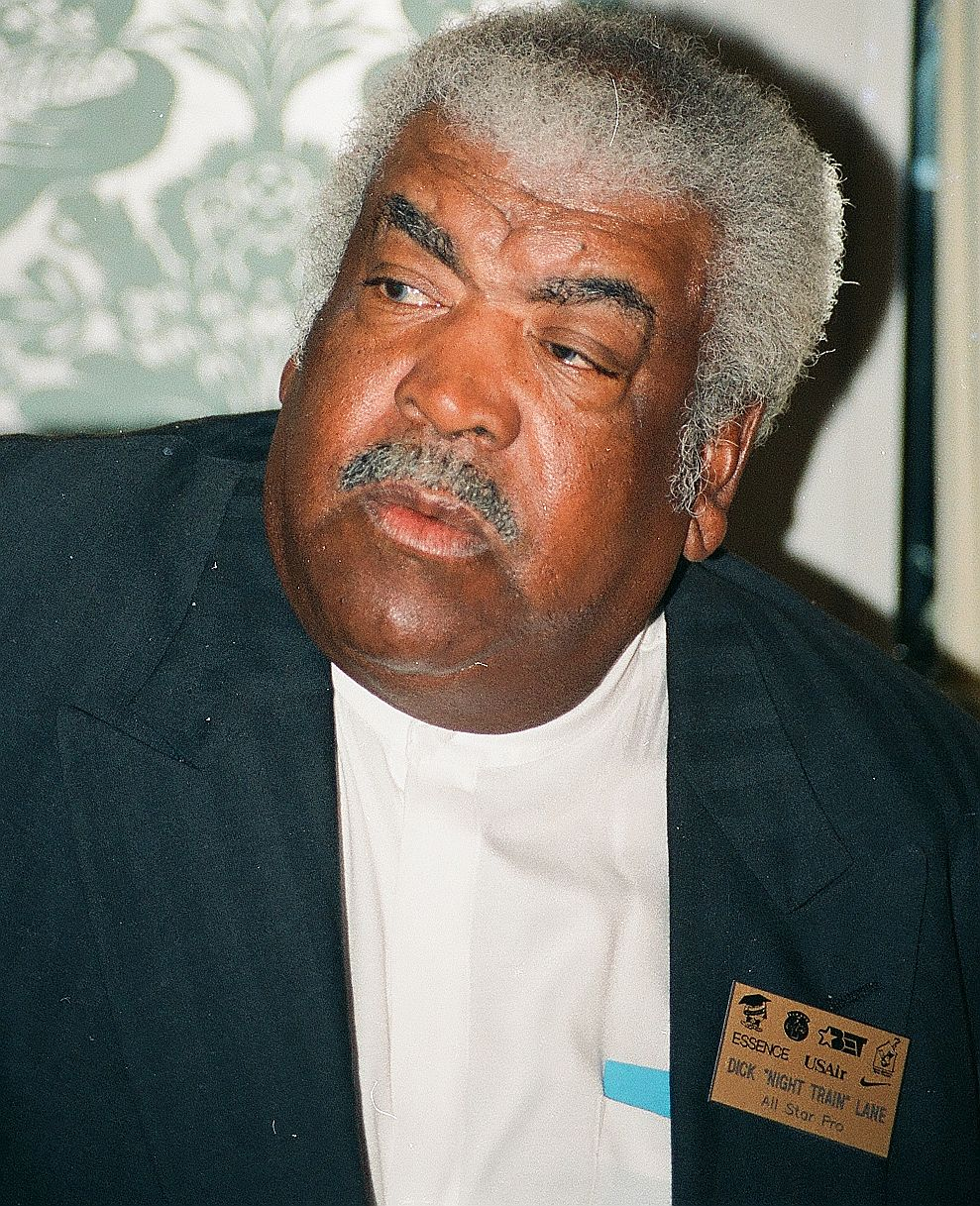
Lane in 1997

After retiring from professional football, Lane worked for the Detroit Lions in various administrative positions. He was the first African American to work in the Lions' front office. In February 1972, Lane quit his job with the Lions to become an assistant football coach at Southern University, a historically black university in Baton Rouge, Louisiana. He left Southern University in June 1973 to become an admissions counselor and assistant football coach at Central State University, a historically black university in Wilberforce, Ohio. In January 1974, he resigned his position at Central State to accept a job in Los Angeles as a bodyguard and personal assistant for television star, Redd Foxx.

In October 1975, Lane was hired to manage Detroit's Police Athletic League. He remained in charge of the program for 17 years and oversaw its expansion to 16 centers with 20,000 participants. He retired from the post at the end of 1992.

== Personal life and death ==
Lane was married three times. He married his first wife, Geraldine Dandridge, in April 1951. The couple separated in August 1962 and was divorced in January 1963.

In July 1963, Lane married jazz singer Dinah Washington at a ceremony in Las Vegas. It was reported to be the sixth marriage for Washington and the second for Lane. On December 14, 1963, Lane discovered Washington dead at their home at 4002 Buena Vista Street in Detroit with a bottle of prescription pills on the night stand beside her.

In 1964, Lane married school teacher Mary Cowser, who in 1955 became the first African-American woman to appear in Coca-Cola advertisements. They had a son, Richard Ladimir Lane, who was born in 1965. The marriage ended in divorce after ten years.

In 1994, Lane moved from Detroit back to his hometown of Austin, Texas. Due to reduced mobility from diabetes and knee injuries, he spent the last two years of his life at the Five Star Assisted Living facility in north Austin. He died there from a heart attack in January 2002 at age 73, after playing dominoes and while listening to jazz in his room. His family believed that he also suffered from chronic traumatic encephalopathy (CTE) brought on by football-related brain injuries.
