= Ray Wietecha =

American football player (1928–2002)

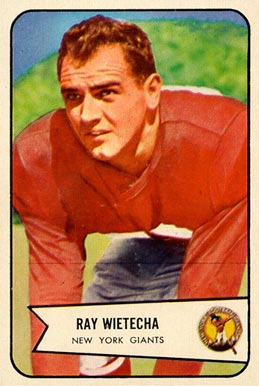
- Wietecha on a 1954 Bowman football card

No. 55
- Position: Center

Personal information
- Born: November 4, 1928; East Chicago, Indiana, U.S.
- Died: December 14, 2002 (aged 74); Phoenix, Arizona, U.S.
- Listed height: 6 ft 1 in (1.85 m)
- Listed weight: 225 lb (102 kg)

Career information
- College: Michigan State (1946); Northwestern (1948–1950)
- NFL draft: 1950: 12th round, 150th overall pick

Career history

Playing
- New York Giants (1953–1962)

Coaching
- Los Angeles Rams (1963–1964) Offensive line coach; Green Bay Packers (1965–1970) Offensive coordinator; New York Giants (1972–1976) Offensive line coach

Awards and highlights
- As a player: NFL champion (1956); First-team All-Pro (1958); 3× Second-team All-Pro (1956, 1961, 1962); 4× Pro Bowl (1957–1958, 1960, 1962); 58th greatest New York Giant of all-time; As a coach: 2× Super Bowl champion (I, II)

Career NFL statistics
- Games played: 124
- Games started: 122
- Fumble recoveries: 3
- Stats at Pro Football Reference

Raymond Walter Wietecha (/waɪˈtɛkə/ wy-TEK-ə; November 2, 1928 – December 14, 2002) was an American professional football player who was a center for the New York Giants of the National Football League (NFL). He played college football for the Michigan State Spartans and Northwestern Wildcats. Wietecha was selected to the Pro Bowl four times and was a first or second team All-Pro four times. He never missed a game during his ten-year career with the Giants, playing in 124 consecutive games overall. He was made the team's starting center in his second year, and started 112 consecutive games at center over nine years, missing only one play on offense during that entire time. He played in five NFL championship games between 1956 and 1962. He was the offensive line coach for the Green Bay Packers teams that won three consecutive NFL championships from 1965 to 1967 and the first two Super Bowls.

== Early life ==
Wietecha was born on November 4, 1928, in East Chicago, Indiana. He attended Theodore Roosevelt High School in East Chicago (1942–46), where he was a two-way player on the school's football team, under Indiana Football Hall of Fame coach Pete Rucinski. In 1945, the United Press named the 5 ft 10 in (1.78 m) 170 lb. (77.1 kg) Wietecha first-team All-State at center. Roosevelt was 9–0, conference champion, and the top ranked team in Indiana high school football by mid-November that year. On November 19, Roosevelt went on to win the Indiana state championship game, 23–0, over South Bend Central, the school's first ever state championship. Wietecha led the defense, which held South Bend to only 72 rushing yards in the shoutout victory.

== College career ==
His excellence as a football player provided the means for him to attend college. Wietecha originally attended Michigan State University in 1946, and played on the football team, but decided to transfer to Northwestern University after one season. He graduated from Northwestern in 1951, after three seasons on the Wildcats football team (1947–50). He was a member of the Northwestern team that defeated the University of California in the January 1, 1949 Rose Bowl, 20–14. He played left linebacker in that game, and delivered some hard tackles to Cal's star player Jackie Jensen (who went on to play Major League Baseball).

Wietecha became Northwestern's starting center on offense the following season (1949). As a senior in 1950, he was a leading player on the team, at center on offense and linebacker on defense. He would sometimes play a full 60-minute game. He was originally only going to play center in 1950, but when the team's defense faltered later in the season he was called on to play linebacker again, and was excellent in doing so. Wietecha was selected to play in the Blue-Gray Game. His was named All-Big Ten and was honorable mention on numerous All-America teams.

Wietecha also played on Northwestern's baseball team for three years, and was one of the Big Ten's leading hitters. He graduated from Northwestern with a degree in education.

== Military Service ==
Wietecha was accepted into the United States Marine Corps Officer's Candidate School, at Parris Island. He spent two years in the Marine Corps. He became a platoon leader, and then a company executive officer, reaching the rank of first lieutenant. He was permanently stationed at Quantico, where he played two seasons of organized football under Major Charlie Walker, and one of baseball, for the Quantico Marines team. Wietecha was All-Marine in football. His Marine football teammates included, among others, future NFL players Jim Mutscheller, Jim Weatherall, and Ken Huxhold. The Quantico Marines opponents included college as well as other military teams; including among other opponents St. Bonaventure, led by future NFL quarterback and coach Ted Marchibroda, in October 1951.

== Professional baseball career ==
In 1953, Wietecha played one season of Minor League Baseball (MiLB). He played in the outfield for the Class B Charlotte Hornets of the Tri-State League; an affiliate of the Washington Senators. Wietecha had a .255 batting average, with 13 home runs and 60 runs batted in (RBI) in 381 at bats. Senators farm director Ossie Bluege, who had played 18 years for the Senators, believed Wietecha could become an excellent Major League Baseball player.

Bluege scouted Wietecha, watching him play baseball in the military while Wietecha was serving as an officer with the Marine Corps. Bluege was aware the New York Yankees were also interested in Wietecha, and that Wietecha was well-educated and could simply get a good job. He was able to convince Wietecha to take a chance on the opportunity to play baseball professionally, and Wietecha agreed to sign on with the Senators. He was discharged from the Marines on March 18, 1953, and joined the Charlotte baseball club the next day.

At the time, Wietecha chose professional baseball over professional football, with the understanding that his goal was to reach the Major League level as soon as possible. However, he had placed a time limit on reaching this objective, and expected that if it was not attainable, he would be the first to realize it and would leave baseball.

Wietecha believed he had an understanding with Bluege that he would be joining the New York Giants for football training camp later in the summer, so he could play football in the NFL that season, returning to the Hornets next spring. When he joined the Giants training camp later that summer, before completing the Hornets season, Senators owner Clark Griffith believed Wietecha breached his contract. Griffith objected to NFL Commissioner Bert Bell that Wietecha was still under contract with the Senators to play for Charlotte the rest of the baseball season. Bell then told the Giants the league did not want a conflict with Major League Baseball. The Giants told Wietecha to leave camp (even though they were pleased with him as a player). Instead of returning to Charlotte, Wietecha returned home to East Chicago to contemplate his future plans. By then he was favoring a career in football over baseball, but thought he would have to get a non-sports job and wait until 1954 to play for the Giants, because even if he could return to the Giants in 1953 he would be too far behind the other players from missing training camp.

In later years, during the NFL off season, he played Industrial League baseball.

== Professional football career ==
The New York Giants had selected Wietecha in the 12th round of the 1950 NFL draft, 150th overall, with a “futures“ pick. Despite the issues with Senators, he rejoined the Giants and was one of ten rookies making the team by late September 1953. For the next 10 seasons he never missed a game during his ten-year Giants’ career, playing in 124 consecutive games. He wore No. 55 for the Giants.

In 1953, Wietecha was the backup center to John Rapacz and also played linebacker, defensive back and defensive end as a rookie, starting 10 of the 12 games in which he appeared, with one interception. The Giants were 3–9 that season. In 1954, legendary coach Vince Lombardi joined the Giants as their offensive coordinator, a position he would hold with the Giants through 1958. Under Lombardi, Wietecha became the Giant's starting center in 1954, a position he started for the Giants for the next 112 consecutive games from 1954 to 1962. During his nine years as a center, he missed only one offensive play.

The offensive line also included future Hall of Fame left tackle Roosevelt "Rosey" Brown, who started on the offensive line with Wietecha throughout Wietecha's entire career at center. The Giants were 7–5 in 1954, and 6–5–1 in 1955. He played every minute on offense in 1955.

The Giants went 8–3–1 in 1956, winning the NFL's East Division, and then went on to win the 1956 NFL championship against the Chicago Bears, 47–7. Wietecha played the most minutes of any Giant player that season; not only playing center, but filling in at defensive tackle and linebacker when needed. With Wietecha at center, the Giants won four more East Division titles, but lost in the Championship game each of those seasons (1958, 1959, 1961, 1962).

Wietecha was leader of the Giants' offensive line over the years, directing his linemates in their blocking assignments. He also showed leadership qualities beyond his position. In a 1956 game with the Chicago Cardinals, a brawl involving multiple players pairing off to fight erupted, and fans poured onto the field in New York. A Cardinals player grabbed Wietecha and raised his fists to fight. Instead of throwing a punch, the ex-Marine Wietecha told the Cardinal player to hold up, and then said "'I'm being paid to play football and so are you. We're not being paid to fight'". The Cardinal player agreed, told Wietecha that what he said made sense, and then shook Wietecha's hand. The other players followed their lead, shaking hands and apologizing to each other; and the police quickly moved the fans back into the stands. During a 1958 playoff game against the Cleveland Browns, Wietecha had to tackle his own teammate Mel Triplett twice, to stop him from fighting Cleveland Browns players who had gang tackled Triplett (though Wietecha could not prevent Triplett's ejection in the Giant's win).

Because of the team's success, the Giants' offensive line did not suffer from the position's usual anonymity. Wietecha said "When we won, the Giants' offensive line became famous. I became well known". Wietecha also participated in the 1958 NFL championship game against the Baltimore Colts, which came to be known as "the Greatest Game Ever Played". The game had an explosive effect on increasing the popularity of professional football. One of his Colts opponents that day was former Quantico Marines teammate Jim Mutscheller.

Wietecha was selected to play in the Pro Bowl in 1957, 1958, 1960 and 1962. In 1957, The Sporting News named him first-team All-Conference and the Newspaper Enterprise Association (NEA) named him second-team All-Pro. In 1958, he was selected first-team All-Pro by the Associated Press (AP), United Press International (UPI) and the NEA; and in 1959 they each named him second-team All-Pro. In 1962, the AP and UPI named him second-team All-Pro.

Wietecha was also known as an exceptional long snapper. He had the ability to snap the ball perfectly while looking forward at the defense, instead of back at the holder and kicker; and to snap the ball so that the laces faced away from the kicker every time. During a Pro Bowl practice, Hall of Fame kicker Lou Groza, and Hall of Fame receiver Tommy McDonald (acting as holder), were amazed by Wietecha's precision in placing the laces and his ability not to look back. Wietecha's own kicker with the Giants, Pat Summerall, said over four years he had never seen the laces of the football facing him on a kick. Tacoma, Washington sports writer Dave Boling called Wietecha the Babe Ruth and Michael Jordan of long snappers, and suggested a college long snapper award be named in his honor.

Wietecha retired in January 1963 to join former Giant teammate Harland Svare as offensive line coach of the Los Angeles Rams.

== Coaching and scouting career ==
Wietecha coached the Rams' offensive line in 1963 and 1964. The Rams' offense went from 13th in the NFL in points scored in 1963 (210), to eighth in 1964 (283). He was then hired by head coach Vince Lombardi to become an assistant coach for the Green Bay Packers. He was the Packers offensive line coach from 1965 to 1968 (three years under Lombardi and one under Phil Bengston), during which time the Packers won the NFL championship in 1965, and Super Bowl I (1966 season) and Super Bowl II (1967 season). He then served two more years (1968–69) as the Packers' running back coach under Bengston. In later years, he was described as Lombardi's offensive coordinator.

He became the Giants' offensive line coach from 1972 to 1976, under former teammate Alex Webster (1972–73), Bill Arnsparger (1974–76) and John McVay (1976). His final season as an offensive line coach in the NFL was with the Buffalo Bills in 1977, under head coach Jim Ringo, a Hall of Fame center who had been the leading center in the NFL during Wietecha's playing years.

From 1985 to 1995, he was a scout for the Packers.

== USFL ==
Wietecha was an assistant coach in the USFL for the Chicago Blitz and the Arizona Wranglers.

== Honors ==
In 2024, Wietecha was selected at 58th on the list of Giants' all-time Top 100 Players. In 2012, the Professional Football Researchers Association named Wietecha to the PRFA Hall of Very Good Class of 2012. In 1976, he was inducted into the Indiana Football Hall of Fame. He was among 162 senior nominees for induction into the 2026 Pro Football Hall of Fame Class.

== Death ==
Wietecha died of an aneurysm on December 14, 2002, in Phoenix. He was survived by his wife Joan, three children and eight grandchildren.
