= Bill Svoboda =

American football player (1928–1980)

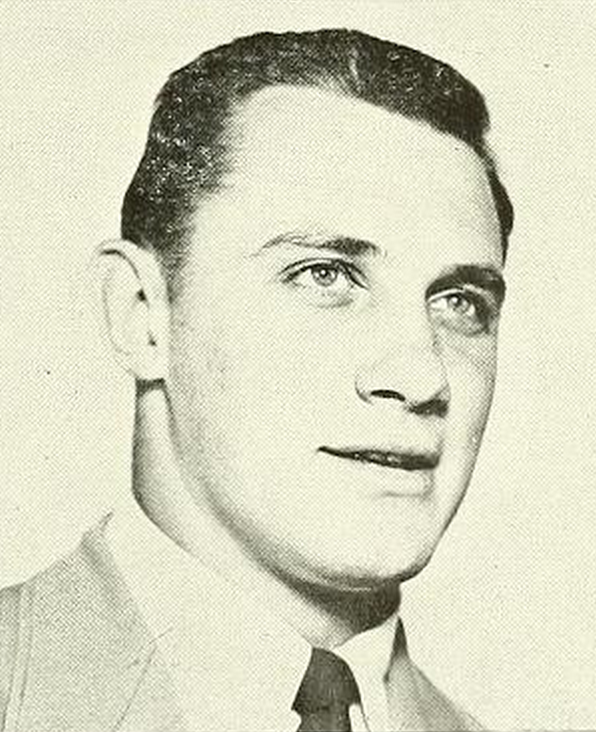

No. 67, 31, 30
- Positions: Linebacker, fullback

Personal information
- Born: July 12, 1928; Wichita Falls, Texas, U.S.
- Died: June 20, 1980 (aged 51); Houma, Louisiana, U.S.
- Listed height: 6 ft 0 in (1.83 m)
- Listed weight: 210 lb (95 kg)

Career information
- High school: Bonham (Bonham, Texas)
- College: Tulane (1946–1949)
- NFL draft: 1950: 3rd round, 29th overall pick

Career history
- Chicago Cardinals (1950–1953); New York Giants (1954–1958)

Awards and highlights
- NFL champion (1956); Second-team All-Pro (1956); Pro Bowl (1953)

Career NFL statistics
- Interceptions: 9
- Fumble recoveries: 12
- Stats at Pro Football Reference

William Ray Svoboda (July 12, 1928 – June 20, 1980) was an American professional football player who was a linebacker for nine seasons in the National Football League (NFL) with the Chicago Cardinals and New York Giants. He played college football for the Tulane Green Wave and was selected in the third round of the 1950 NFL draft. Svoboda died after suffering a heart attack while jogging.

His wife Joyce, who appeared on the Nov 4,1957 evening episode of “The Price Is Right” hosted by Bill Cullen, responded to his question about her size saying she was 4’10” and weighed 89lbs. She described William as 6’1” and 220lbs. While she didn't win any prizes, she received a Polaroid camera as a parting gift.
