= Stan Jones (American football) =

American football player and coach (1931–2010)

No. 78, 73
- Positions: Guard, defensive tackle

Personal information
- Born: November 24, 1931; Altoona, Pennsylvania, U.S.
- Died: May 21, 2010 (aged 78); Broomfield, Colorado, U.S.
- Listed height: 6 ft 1 in (1.85 m)
- Listed weight: 252 lb (114 kg)

Career information
- High school: Lemoyne (Lemoyne, Pennsylvania)
- College: Maryland (1951–1953)
- NFL draft: 1953: 5th round, 55th overall pick

Career history

Playing
- Chicago Bears (1954–1965); Washington Redskins (1966)

Coaching
- Denver Broncos (1967–1971) Defensive line coach; Buffalo Bills (1972–1975) Defensive line coach; Denver Broncos (1976–1987) Defensive line coach; Cleveland Browns (1989–1990) Strength and conditioning coach; New England Patriots (1991–1992) Defensive line coach; Scottish Claymores (1998) Defensive line coach

Awards and highlights
- NFL champion (1963); 2× First-team All-Pro (1955, 1956); Second-team All-Pro (1960); 7× Pro Bowl (1955–1961); 100 greatest Bears of All-Time; National champion (1953); Unanimous All-American (1953); First-team All-ACC (1953); First-team All-Southern (1952)

Career NFL statistics
- Games played: 157
- Games started: 127
- Fumble recoveries: 7
- Sacks: 14
- Stats at Pro Football Reference
- Pro Football Hall of Fame
- College Football Hall of Fame

Stanley Paul Jones (November 24, 1931 – May 21, 2010) was an American professional football guard and defensive tackle who played in the National Football League (NFL) for the Chicago Bears and the Washington Redskins. He was inducted into the Pro Football Hall of Fame in 1991. Jones is credited as the first professional player to use weight training to improve his conditioning for football.

== Early life ==
Jones was born in Altoona, Pennsylvania, but grew up in the Harrisburg area after his father, a telephone company employee, was transferred to that area. He then played football at Lemoyne High School in Lemoyne, Pennsylvania. He attended the University of Maryland, where he was a member of the Sigma Nu fraternity.

== College career ==
Jones attended the University of Maryland, where he played college football as a tackle. He was a unanimous All-American selection in 1953. Jones was on some of the most successful Maryland teams. The Terps were co-champions with Virginia Military Institute in 1951 in the Southern Conference. In 1953, they played in the Atlantic Coast Conference and were co-champions with Duke University. That year, they were also named the national champions. Jones was awarded the Knute Rockne Memorial Trophy as the nation's outstanding lineman and the school awarded him the Anthony Nardo Award as the team's best lineman. He then played in the College All-Star Game against the Detroit Lions.

== Professional career ==
"He was a leader, somebody you look up to.
I'll tell you one thing, he could lift the side
of a house. He was one strong son of a gun."

— Fred Williams, on Jones' ability.

Jones was drafted 55th overall in the fifth round of the 1953 NFL draft by the Chicago Bears and started in 1954 as an offensive tackle. In 1955, Jones switched to guard and, for the next eight seasons, was a fixture at that position and one of the NFL's most highly respected guards.

When the Bears needed help on defense in 1962, assistant coach George Allen decided that Jones could help at defensive tackle. He played both ways in 1962 and then switched to defensive tackle permanently in 1963.

After 1965, Bears coach George Halas agreed, as a favor to Jones, to trade him to the Washington Redskins so that he could play a final season near his home in Rockville, Maryland. He retired after the 1966 season.

Jones missed only two games his first 11 seasons, was an All-Pro guard in 1955, 1956, 1959, and 1960, and played in seven straight Pro Bowls following the 1955 through 1961 seasons. He has also been credited as the first professional player to use weight training for football conditioning.

== Coaching career ==
After playing football, Jones became an assistant coach for the Denver Broncos, Buffalo Bills, Cleveland Browns, and the New England Patriots. He later went back to work, this time as a defensive line coach for the Scottish Claymores of NFL Europe.

During the mid-1950s Jones also worked in the off-season teaching physical education in the Montgomery County elementary schools.

== Honors ==
Jones is a member of the Pro Football Hall of Fame and College Football Hall of Fame. In 1977, he made the Atlantic Coast Conference 25-year team. Jones died on May 21, 2010, from complications of a stroke. He had a heart attack which triggered his death. Jones was also named to the Pennsylvania Sports Hall of Fame.
