= Joe Robustelli =

American football player (born 1997)

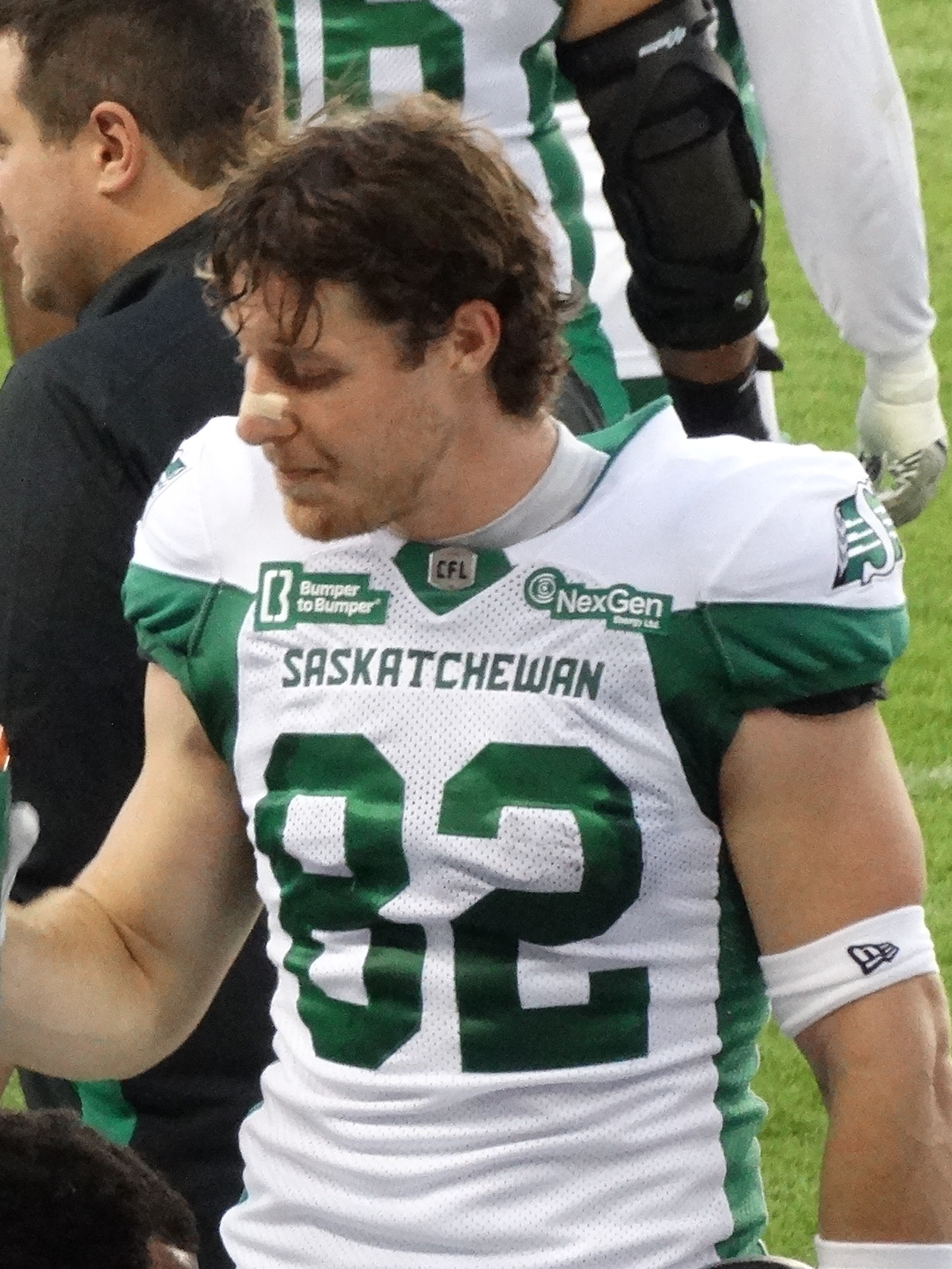
- Robustelli with the Saskatchewan Roughriders in 2025

No. 17 – Edmonton Elks
- Position: Wide receiver
- Roster status: Active
- CFL status: American

Personal information
- Born: July 30, 1997 (age 29); Stamford, Connecticut, U.S.
- Listed height: 6 ft 3 in (1.91 m)
- Listed weight: 220 lb (100 kg)

Career information
- High school: Riverview (Sarasota, Florida)
- College: Tusculum
- NFL draft: 2024: undrafted

Career history
- Saskatchewan Roughriders (2024–2025); Edmonton Elks (2026–present)

Awards and highlights
- 2× Grey Cup champion (2025, 2026)

Career CFL statistics as of 2026
- Receptions: 63
- Receiving yards: 849
- Receiving average: 13.5
- Receiving touchdowns: 5
- Stats at CFL.ca

Joe Robustelli (born July 30, 1997) is an American professional football wide receiver for the Edmonton Elks of the Canadian Football League (CFL). Robustelli played college football for the Tusculum Pioneers.

== College career ==
Robustelli played for the Division II Tusculum Pioneers of Tusculum University in 2023. He played in eight games and recorded 20 catches, 475 yards and six touchdowns. Prior to Tusculum, he was a member of the Beta Iota Chapter of the Phi Kappa Tau fraternity at Florida State University.

== Professional career ==
=== Saskatchewan Roughriders ===
On May 21, 2024, Robustelli was signed by the Saskatchewan Roughriders. On June 1, Robustelli was signed to the practice roster. He made his Canadian Football League (CFL) debut against the Calgary Stampeders in the final week of the regular season. He finished with two catches and 15 yards. On November 1, he was added to the 1-game injured list and missed the Western Semi-Final against the BC Lions.

On June 1, 2025, Robustelli was added to the practice roster. On June 19, he was activated to the active roster. On July 12, in a game against the Stampeders, Robustelli exploded for 191 yards on 11 receptions and his first CFL touchdown.

=== Edmonton Elks ===
Robustelli joined the Edmonton Elks through free agency on February 10, 2026.

== Personal life ==
Robustelli is the grandson of Pro Football Hall of Famer, defensive lineman Andy Robustelli.
