= Duane Putnam =

American football player and coach (1928–2016)

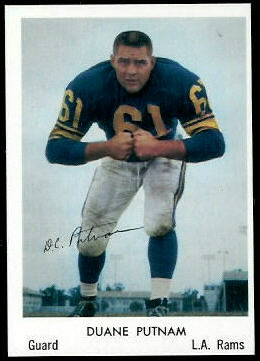
- Putnam in 1959

No. 61, 62
- Position: Guard

Personal information
- Born: September 5, 1928; Pollock, South Dakota, U.S.
- Died: March 21, 2016 (aged 87)
- Listed height: 6 ft 0 in (1.83 m)
- Listed weight: 228 lb (103 kg)

Career information
- High school: Antioch (Antioch, California)
- College: Pacific (1948–1951)
- NFL draft: 1952: 6th round, 66th overall pick

Career history

Playing
- Los Angeles Rams (1952–1959); Dallas Cowboys (1960); Cleveland Browns (1961); Los Angeles Rams (1962)

Coaching
- Atlanta Falcons (1969–1974) Offensive line coach; Philadelphia Bell (1975) Defensive line coach; Philadelphia Eagles (1976–1978) Offensive line coach; St. Louis Cardinals (1979–1980) Offensive line coach

Awards and highlights
- 3× First-team All-Pro (1955, 1957, 1958); 2× Second-team All-Pro (1954, 1956); 5× Pro Bowl (1954–1958); First-team All-PCC (1951)

Career NFL statistics
- Games played: 121
- Games started: 92
- Fumble recoveries: 4
- Stats at Pro Football Reference

Duane Clifford Putnam (September 5, 1928 – March 21, 2016) was an American professional football player who was an offensive guard for 10 seasons in the National Football League (NFL). He played college football for the Pacific Tigers and was selected in the sixth round of the 1952 NFL draft. He played in the NFL for the Los Angeles Rams, Dallas Cowboys, and the Cleveland Browns. After retiring from playing, he was the offensive line coach for the Atlanta Falcons, Philadelphia Eagles and the St. Louis Cardinals.

== Early life ==
Putnam was born in Pollock, South Dakota and attended Antioch High School in Antioch, California, where he played football, basketball and track and field. As a senior, he was a part of an undefeated team and received All-Contra Costa County honors in football, while also winning a shot put championship.

After graduation, he served in the First Cavalry of the United States Army from 1946 to 1948. He played college football at the University of the Pacific. He was named a charter member of the Pacific Athletics Hall of Fame in 1982, and was inducted into the Antioch Sports Legends Hall of Fame in 2007.

== Professional career ==
Putnam was selected by the Los Angeles Rams in the sixth round (66th pick overall) of the 1952 NFL draft. During his time with the Rams, he became one of the best guards in the NFL and was specially known for his effectiveness pulling on sweeps. He appeared in five straight Pro Bowls from 1954 to 1958. He was named to the All-Pro team in 1955, 1957 and 1958.

Putnam was selected by the Dallas Cowboys in the 1960 NFL expansion draft and became the first starter at left guard in franchise history. On August 15, 1961, he was traded to the Cleveland Browns in exchange for a third round draft choice (#39-Bobby Plummer). In 1961, he played for the Browns and got a chance to block for running backs Jim Brown and Bobby Mitchell. He was released on August 22, 1962. In 1962, he was signed by the Los Angeles Rams to play right guard. The next year, he announced his retirement, after playing eleven seasons in the NFL. The Professional Football Researchers Association named Putnam to the PRFA Hall of Very Good Class of 2016.

== Coaching career ==
After retiring, he was the assistant football coach at Los Angeles Valley College for two years. He also served as an offensive line coach for the Atlanta Falcons, Philadelphia Eagles and the St. Louis Cardinals. In 1974, he served as defensive line coach for the Philadelphia Bell of the World Football League.

== Personal life and death ==
Putnam's daughter, Pamela Gail Putnam (born 1952), was married to Michael Reagan, the eldest son of former U.S. President Ronald Reagan from 1971 to 1972.

Duane Putnam died on March 21, 2016, at the age of 87.

== See also ==
- History of the Los Angeles Rams
