= Chuck Drazenovich =

American football player (1927–1992)

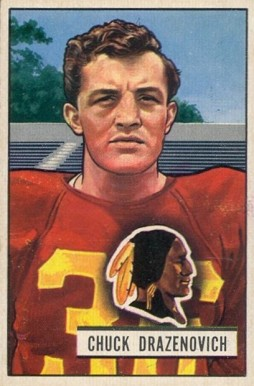
- Drazenovich on a 1951 Bowman football card

No. 36
- Positions: Linebacker, fullback

Personal information
- Born: August 7, 1927; Jere, West Virginia, U.S.
- Died: February 27, 1992 (aged 64); Annandale, Virginia, U.S.
- Listed height: 6 ft 1 in (1.85 m)
- Listed weight: 225 lb (102 kg)

Career information
- High school: Brownsville (PA)
- College: Penn State (1945, 1947–1949)
- NFL draft: 1949: 9th round, 82nd overall pick

Career history
- Washington Redskins (1950–1959)

Awards and highlights
- 2× Second-team All-Pro (1956, 1958); 4× Pro Bowl (1955–1958); 80 Greatest Redskins

Career NFL statistics
- Rushing yards: 330
- Rushing average: 2.8
- Receptions: 10
- Receiving yards: 139
- Interceptions: 15
- Touchdowns: 8
- Stats at Pro Football Reference

Charles Mark Drazenovich (August 7, 1927 – February 27, 1992) was an American professional football player who spent his entire 10-year career as a linebacker with the Washington Redskins of the National Football League (NFL) from 1950 to 1959. He played college football for the Penn State Nittany Lions and was selected in the ninth round of the 1949 NFL draft. Drazenovich played in four Pro Bowls (1955–1958) and was selected as one of the 80 Greatest Redskins. From 1964 to 1967 he was a radio announcer for the team.
