= Ogden Compton =

American football player (1932–2020)

No. 17
- Position: Quarterback

Personal information
- Born: August 25, 1932; Ithaca, New York, U.S.
- Died: August 13, 2020 (aged 87)

Career information
- College: Hardin–Simmons
- NFL draft: : Dallas, Texasth overall pick

Career history
- Chicago Cardinals (1955)

Career statistics
- Passing attempts: 61
- Passing completions: 22
- Completion percentage: 36.1%
- TD–INT: 1–6
- Passing yards: 339
- Passer rating: 21.2
- Stats at Pro Football Reference

Ogden Bingham Compton (August 25, 1932 – August 13, 2020) was an American football quarterback in the National Football League (NFL). He played for the Chicago Cardinals. He played college football for Hardin–Simmons.

On November 13, 1955, Compton threw the only touchdown pass of his NFL career, a completion to Dick "Night Train" Lane that covered 98 yards, the second longest pass in NFL history up to that time.
