= 1959 All-Pro Team =

Official list of the best NFL players in 1959

Selectors of All-Pros for the 1959 National Football League season included the Associated Press (AP), United Press International (UPI), New York Daily News (NYDN), Newspaper Enterprise Association (NEA), and The Sporting News (SN).

== Offensive selections ==
=== Quarterbacks ===
- Charlie Conerly, New York Giants (AP-2, NEA-2, UPI-2)
- Bobby Layne, Pittsburgh Steelers (AP-2, NEA, UPI)
- Johnny Unitas, Baltimore Colts (AP)

=== Running Backs ===
- Jim Brown, Cleveland Browns (AP, NEA, UPI)
- Lenny Moore, Baltimore Colts (AP, NEA, UPI-2)
- Frank Gifford, New York Giants (AP-1, NEA, UPI)

=== Ends ===
- Del Shofner, Los Angeles Rams (AP, NEA, UPI)
- Raymond Berry, Baltimore Colts (AP, NEA, UPI)

=== Tackles ===
- Jim Parker, Baltimore Colts (AP, NEA, UPI)
- Rosey Brown, New York Giants (AP, NEA, UPI)

=== Guards ===
- Jim Ray Smith, Cleveland Browns (AP, NEA, UPI)
- Art Spinney, Baltimore Colts (AP-2, NEA-2, UPI)

=== Centers ===
- Jim Ringo, Green Bay Packers (AP, NEA, UPI)

== Defensive selections ==
=== Defensive Ends ===
- Gino Marchetti, Baltimore Colts (AP, NEA, UPI)
- Andy Robustelli, New York Giants (AP, NEA, UPI)

=== Defensive Tackles ===
- Leo Nomellini, San Francisco 49ers (AP, NEA, UPI)
- Gene Lipscomb, Baltimore Colts (AP, NEA-2, UPI)

=== Linebackers ===
- Sam Huff, New York Giants (AP, NEA, UPI)
- Joe Schmidt, Detroit Lions (AP, NEA, UPI)
- Bill George, Chicago Bears (AP, NEA, UPI)

=== Defensive Backs ===
- Jimmy Patton, New York Giants (AP, NEA, UPI)
- Jack Butler, Pittsburgh Steelers (AP, NEA, UPI)
- Andy Nelson, Baltimore Colts (AP, UPI-2)
- Abe Woodson, San Francisco 49ers (AP, NEA-2, UPI)
