= Bob St. Clair =

American football player (1931–2015)

- St. Clair in 1961

No. 79
- Position: Offensive tackle

Personal information
- Born: February 18, 1931; San Francisco, California, U.S.
- Died: April 20, 2015 (aged 84); Santa Rosa, California, U.S.
- Listed height: 6 ft 9 in (2.06 m)
- Listed weight: 263 lb (119 kg)

Career information
- High school: San Francisco Polytechnic
- College: San Francisco (1949–1951); Tulsa (1952)
- NFL draft: 1953: 3rd round, 32nd overall pick

Career history
- San Francisco 49ers (1953–1963)

Awards and highlights
- 5× First-team All-Pro (1955, 1956, 1958, 1960, 1961); 4× Second-team All-Pro (1953, 1954, 1962, 1963); 5× Pro Bowl (1956, 1958–1961); NFL 1950s All-Decade Team; San Francisco 49ers Hall of Fame; San Francisco 49ers No. 79 retired

Career NFL statistics
- Games played: 119
- Starts: 117
- Fumble recoveries: 7
- Stats at Pro Football Reference
- Pro Football Hall of Fame

Bob St. Clair

Mayor of Daly City
- In office 1961–1962

Personal details
- Party: Democratic
- Occupation: Politician

Robert Bruce St. Clair (February 18, 1931 – April 20, 2015) was an American professional football offensive tackle who played 11 seasons for the San Francisco 49ers of the National Football League (NFL). Known for his intelligence and towering size, at 6 ft 9 in (2.06 m) tall, St. Clair earned All-Pro honors nine times and is enshrined in the Pro Football Hall of Fame. He played college football for the San Francisco Dons and the Tulsa Golden Hurricane.

== College career ==
A native San Franciscan, Bob St. Clair attended San Francisco Polytechnic High School (located across the street from Kezar Stadium) and the University of San Francisco, and was part of USF's undefeated 1951 team, which famously refused to play in the Orange Bowl because the team was asked to keep its black players, future NFL hall of famer Ollie Matson and future NFL game official Burl Toler, from playing because they were black. Since USF did not return to field a football team for the 1952 season, St. Clair finished his college career at the University of Tulsa.

== Professional career ==
St. Clair was drafted by the 49ers in the third round of the 1953 NFL draft. He played his entire 11-year professional career in San Francisco, making his year at Tulsa the only season he did not play home games in Kezar Stadium.

He began his career by successfully holding out for a $6,000 rookie salary. In his first preseason, he earned his spot on the 1953 team by holding his own against defensive tackle Leo Nomellini in practice. Primarily an offensive tackle, he played alongside the Million Dollar Backfield, whose halfback Hugh McElhenny considered him a dominant blocker. He started every game for the 49ers from 1954 to 1956, when he also received his first Pro Bowl selection.

Due to his size, St. Clair was also an effective special teams player. He blocked 19 field goals over the course of his career, ten of which came in 1956, and was instrumental in Abe Woodson's 105-yard kick return touchdown in 1959.

His only postseason game came in 1957. After missing eight weeks with a shoulder injury early in the season, St. Clair returned as the 49ers ended the season with an 8–4 record, tying the Detroit Lions to force a one-game playoff, which Detroit won in a 31–27 comeback victory.

St. Clair once again started at least ten games in each of the 1958–1961 seasons, receiving Pro Bowl honors each year. He missed time due to an Achilles injury in 1962, but returned to play the entire 1963 season, for which he received the 49ers' Len Eshmont Award. During the 1964 preseason, he injured his other Achilles tendon during punt return practice, requiring career-ending surgery.

A perennial team captain, St. Clair was nicknamed "the Geek" (Note: In reference to Tyrone Power's character in the 1947 film Nightmare Alley.) by his teammates due to his eccentric off-the-field behavior, including a habit of eating raw meat, which he frequently used to intimidate 49ers rookies.

St. Clair was elected to the Pro Football Hall of Fame in 1990. On January 19, 2001, the city of San Francisco renamed the field at Kezar Stadium in his honor in recognition of his having played all his high school and professional home games and three-quarters of his college home games there, and his number was retired by the 49ers later that year.

== Personal life ==
While still an active player, St. Clair was elected to Daly City's city council in 1958, which included a term as mayor from 1961 to 1962; one of his mayoral and council colleagues was his high school coach Joe Verducci. The 49ers made arrangements for him to fly back to Daly City for council business during road trips. He was the county supervisor for San Mateo County from 1966 to 1974. For many years he owned a liquor store at 24th and Sanchez in Noe Valley, which still bears his name.

St. Clair broke his hip in February 2015; complications led to his death in Santa Rosa, California, on April 20, 2015, at the age of 84.
