= Les Richter =

American football player (1930–2010)

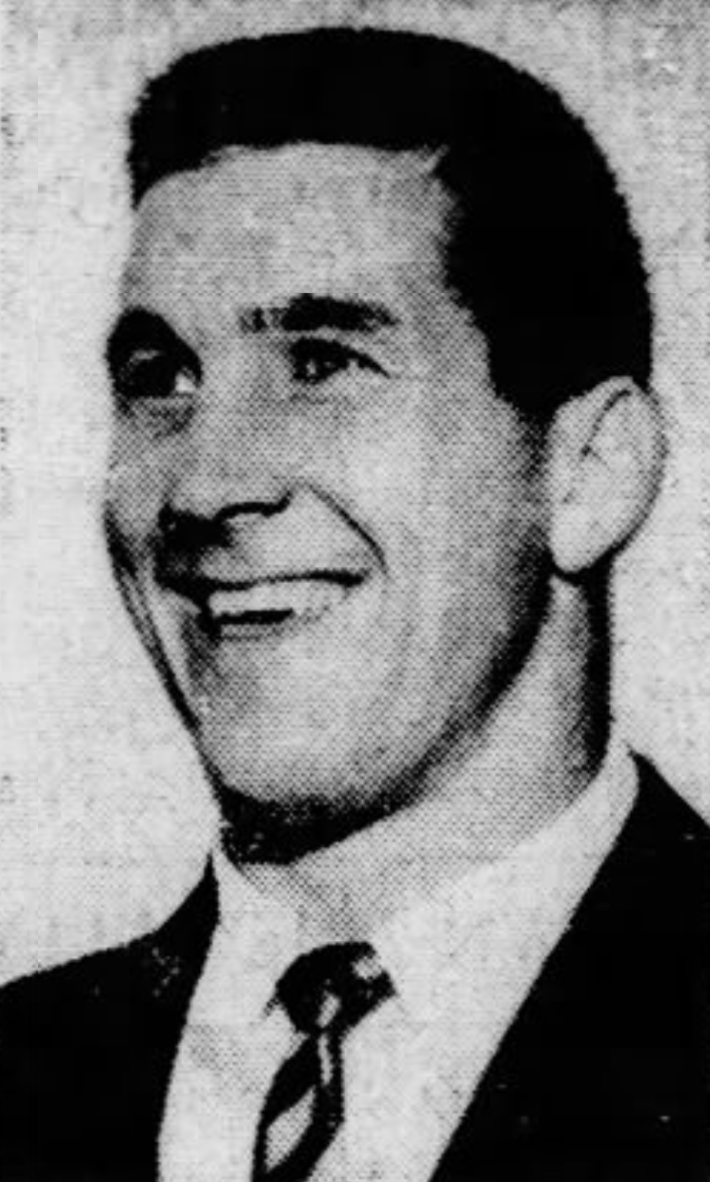
- Richter in 1967

No. 67, 48
- Positions: Linebacker, guard, placekicker

Personal information
- Born: October 6, 1930; Fresno, California, U.S.
- Died: June 12, 2010 (aged 79); Riverside, California, U.S.
- Listed height: 6 ft 3 in (1.91 m)
- Listed weight: 238 lb (108 kg)

Career information
- High school: Fresno
- College: California
- NFL draft: 1952: 1st round, 2nd overall pick

Career history
- Los Angeles Rams (1954–1962)

Awards and highlights
- 4× First-team All-Pro (1955–1958); 3× Second-team All-Pro (1959, 1960); 8× Pro Bowl (1954–1961); St. Louis Football Ring of Fame; UPI Lineman of the Year (1950); 2× Consensus All-American (1950, 1951); 2× First-team All-Pacific Coast (1950, 1951)

Career NFL statistics
- Fumble recoveries: 12
- Interceptions: 16
- Points: 193
- Stats at Pro Football Reference
- Pro Football Hall of Fame
- College Football Hall of Fame

Leslie Alan Richter (October 6, 1930 – June 12, 2010) was an American professional football player who was a linebacker for the Los Angeles Rams of National Football League (NFL). He also served as the head of operations for NASCAR and president of the Riverside International Raceway. Richter was twice a consensus All-American for the California Golden Bears. With the Rams, he played in eight Pro Bowls. He was inducted to the College Football Hall of Fame in 1982 and the Pro Football Hall of Fame in 2011.

== Football career ==
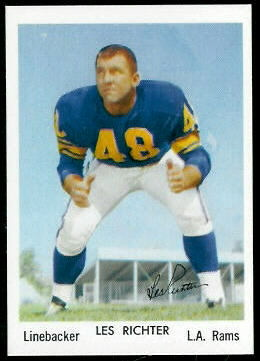
Richter in 1959

At the University of California, Berkeley, Richter played guard and linebacker for the California Golden Bears. He was twice recognized as a consensus All-American and first-team All-Pacific Coast, in 1950 and 1951. While at Cal, Richter was a member of Phi Gamma Delta. He was valedictorian of his graduating class of 1952. After graduation, he served in the Korean War for the U.S. Army for two years. He was a first-round draft choice of the NFL's New York Yanks, the second pick overall, in the 1952 NFL draft. The Yanks folded before the 1952 season, and the Dallas Texans assumed the rights to Richter. They traded him to the Los Angeles Rams for eleven players, the second largest deal ever made for a single player.

During his nine years with the Rams, Richter did not miss a game, playing through various injuries including a broken cheekbone. He scored 193 points, which included a touchdown, 106 extra points, and 29 field goals. On defense, he intercepted 16 passes. His 24 field goals attempted during the 1955 season led the NFL. The Rams struggled during that time, winning six or more games four times in nine seasons. The high mark for the team was in 1955, when it reached the championship game and lost to the Cleveland Browns. Richter was selected to eight straight Pro Bowls, from 1954 to 1961, and was four times recognized as a first-team All-Pro. He played center for his final season, in 1962, taking over for injured starter Art Hunter.

== Racing executive and later years ==
After retiring from football, Richter was involved with auto racing in a variety of positions. He was Riverside International Raceway manager from 1959 to 1983, then vice-president of special projects for International Speedway Corporation, chairman of the board for the International Race of Champions, and senior vice president of operations for NASCAR.

Richter died on June 12, 2010, at age 79 of a brain aneurysm. As a lieutenant with the U.S. Army during the Korean War, Richter was buried at Riverside National Cemetery in Riverside, California. At the time of his death, Richter was working at the Auto Club Speedway, owned by ISC formally owned by Penske Racing that also owned Michigan International Speedway, Nazareth Speedway, Pikes Peak International Raceway and North Carolina Speedway in Rockingham, North Carolina

Richter was inducted into the College Football Hall of Fame in 1982. In 2011, he was posthumously elected as a senior candidate to the Pro Football Hall of Fame class of 2011 along with former Washington Redskins linebacker Chris Hanburger. The induction class also included Deion Sanders, Richard Dent, Marshall Faulk, Ed Sabol, and Shannon Sharpe.

== Awards ==
- He was inducted in the West Coast Stock Car Hall of Fame as a member of its inaugural class in 2002.
- He was inducted into the Motorsports Hall of Fame of America in 2009.
