= Bill Wightkin =

American football player (1927–1997)

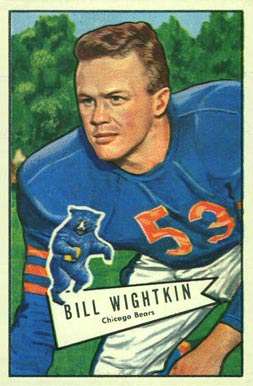
- Wightkin on a 1952 Bowman football card

No. 72, 53, 86
- Positions: Offensive tackle, defensive tackle, end

Personal information
- Born: July 28, 1927; Detroit, Michigan, U.S.
- Died: January 25, 1997 (aged 69); Westchester, Illinois, U.S.
- Listed height: 6 ft 3 in (1.91 m)
- Listed weight: 235 lb (107 kg)

Career information
- High school: Detroit Catholic Central
- College: Notre Dame (1946–1949)
- NFL draft: 1949: 8th round, 79th overall pick

Career history
- Chicago Bears (1950–1957)

Awards and highlights
- First-team All-Pro (1955); Second-team All-Pro (1956); Pro Bowl (1955); 3× National champion (1946, 1947, 1949)

Career NFL statistics
- Receptions: 13
- Receiving yards: 213
- Receiving touchdowns: 2
- Stats at Pro Football Reference

William John Wightkin (July 28, 1927 – January 25, 1997) was an American professional football player for the Chicago Bears of the National Football League (NFL). He played college football for the Notre Dame Fighting Irish.

== Career ==
Wightkin played Offensive tackle, defensive tackle and end for eight seasons between 1950 and 1957 for the Chicago Bears.
