= Andy Robustelli =

American football player, executive, announcer (1925–2011)

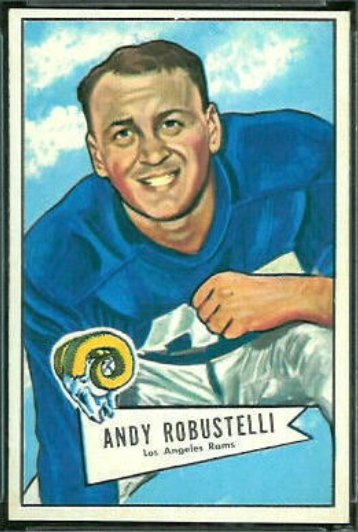
- Robustelli on a 1952 Bowman football card

No. 84, 81
- Position: Defensive end

Personal information
- Born: December 6, 1925; Stamford, Connecticut, U.S.
- Died: May 31, 2011 (aged 85); Stamford, Connecticut, U.S.
- Listed height: 6 ft 1 in (1.85 m)
- Listed weight: 230 lb (104 kg)

Career information
- High school: Stamford; La Salle Military Academy (Oakdale, New York)
- College: Arnold (1947–1950)
- NFL draft: 1951: 19th round, 228th overall pick

Career history

Playing
- Los Angeles Rams (1951–1955); New York Giants (1956–1964)

Coaching
- New York Giants (1962–1964) Defensive coordinator; Brooklyn Dodgers (1966) Head coach

Operations
- New York Giants (1974–1978) General manager

Awards and highlights
- 2× NFL champion (1951, 1956); 6× First-team All-Pro (1953, 1955, 1956, 1958–1960); 4× Second-team All-Pro (1952, 1954, 1957, 1962); 7× Pro Bowl (1953, 1955–1957, 1959–1961); Bert Bell Award (1962); New York Giants Ring of Honor; 10th greatest New York Giant of all-time; Third-team Little All-American (1949)

Career NFL statistics
- Interceptions: 2
- Fumble recoveries: 22
- Total touchdowns: 5
- Stats at Pro Football Reference
- Executive profile at Pro Football Reference
- Pro Football Hall of Fame

Andrew Richard Robustelli (December 6, 1925 – May 31, 2011) was an American professional football player who was a defensive end in the National Football League (NFL) for the Los Angeles Rams and the New York Giants. He played college football at Arnold College and was selected in the nineteenth round of the 1951 NFL draft. Robustelli was a six-time first-team All-Pro selection and was inducted into the Pro Football Hall of Fame in 1971.

== Early life and college ==
Robustelli was born on December 6, 1925, in Stamford, Connecticut, to Lucien Robustelli, an Italian-American and his wife Catherine Robustelli. He attended Stamford High School, where he excelled in football and baseball. At age 18, he enlisted in the United States Navy and served on the USS William C. Cole in the Pacific Theater. After the war, he attended the now-defunct Arnold College, in Milford, Connecticut, where he played both football and baseball. After college, he was drafted in the NFL by the Los Angeles Rams in the nineteenth round of the 1951 NFL draft. In June 1951, he was offered a tryout with the New York Giants baseball club. The Giants offered Robustelli a $400 contract to play for their minor league affiliate, the Knoxville Smokies.

== Professional career ==
A two-way end at Arnold College, Robustelli was selected 228th overall by the Los Angeles Rams in the nineteenth round of the 1951 NFL draft and was considered a long shot to make the team. The Rams were impressed with his determination and toughness as a defensive end and he not only made the team, he was an All-Pro in 1953 and 1955. He played for the Rams until he was traded to the New York Giants in 1956.

Robustelli spent nine seasons with the Giants, playing for six conference champions and one NFL championship team. He was a starter on the Giants defense from 1956 until his retirement after the 1964 season.

In Robustelli's first season, the Giants won the NFL championship. They won Eastern Division titles in 1958, '59, '61, '62, and '63, losing in the NFL championship game each time, in 1958 and 1959 to the Baltimore Colts, in 1961 and 1962 to the Green Bay Packers, and in 1963 to the Chicago Bears.

With the Giants, Robustelli was an All-Pro in 1956, and 1958 through 1960. He received the 1962 Bert Bell Award as best player in the NFL, one of the few defensive players to do so. He played in 174 NFL games, missing only one in his career. Over his career, he recovered 22 fumbles (the NFL record when he retired) and intercepted two passes, returning both for touchdowns.

Although small for a defensive end at 6'0" and 230 pounds, Robustelli was smart, quick, and strong and known as a first-class pass rusher. Robustelli also holds the distinction of being the only football player to have played in the first two nationally televised NFL games.

== Executive career ==
Robustelli returned to the Giants when he was appointed as its director of operations on December 17, 1973. He took over day-to-day control of the Giants, including most football matters. Owner Wellington Mara had been making the team's football decisions himself since joining the Giants organization in the 1930s, and retained control over on-field matters even after the death of his older brother Jack in 1965 made him principal owner of the team. However, he had finally been prevailed upon to give up some of his authority. Although Mara retained the final say on football decisions, for all intents and purposes, Robustelli was the team's first general manager.

He took over a team whose 2–11–1 record the previous season was the worst in the National Football Conference (NFC). The Giants had to play home games at the Yale Bowl in 1974 and Shea Stadium in 1975 before they were finally able to move into Giants Stadium in 1976.

The Giants never had a winning record during Robustelli's five years in the front office. Their best finish during that span was 6–10–0 in 1978, a season which included a 19–17 debacle to the Philadelphia Eagles on November 19 which ended with what is known to Giants fans as simply "Miracle at the Meadowlands." Robustelli announced his resignation as director of operations in conjunction with the Giants' dismissal of head coach John McVay on December 18, 1978, one day after the regular season finale. He had decided one year prior that the 1978 season would be his last with the ballclub. He was succeeded by George Young 58 days later on February 14, 1979.

== Later life ==
After his retirement as an active player, Robustelli spent one year (1965) as a color analyst for NBC's coverage of the American Football League. That same year, he purchased Stamford-based Westheim Travel and renamed it Robustelli Travel Services, Inc. Specializing in corporate travel management, it grew into Robustelli World Travel by the time it was sold to Hogg Robinson Group in 2006.

Robustelli also founded National Professional Athletes (NPA), a sports marketing business which arranged appearances by sports celebrities at corporate functions, and International Equities, which evolved into Robustelli Merchandise Services. The latter eventually became the foundation for Robustelli Corporate Services.

Robustelli was named Walter Camp Man of the Year in 1988. He is an inductee of both the Pro Football Hall of Fame (class of 1971) and the National Italian American Sports Hall of Fame.

Robustelli died on May 31, 2011, from complications following surgery to remove a kidney stone.

=== Relatives ===
Son Bob Robustelli published a biography of his father in 2024, "The Pope of the NFL: The Andy Robustelli Story and the Family That Loved Him".

A grandson, Andrew Robustelli, played college football at Jacksonville University, attended rookie minicamp with the New York Giants in 2015, and played for the Jacksonville Sharks of the Arena Football League in 2016. Another grandson, Joe, plays Canadian football with the Edmonton Elks.

Robustelli's great nephew Dan Sileo played in the NFL with the Tampa Bay Buccaneers and Dallas Cowboys.
