= Dale Dodrill =

American football player (1926–2019)

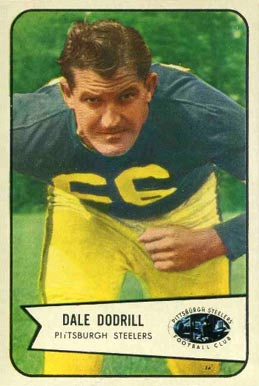
- Dodrill on a 1954 Bowman football card

No. 60
- Positions: Defensive tackle, linebacker

Personal information
- Born: February 7, 1926; Stockton, Kansas, U.S.
- Died: January 18, 2019 (aged 92)
- Listed height: 6 ft 1 in (1.85 m)
- Listed weight: 215 lb (98 kg)

Career information
- High school: Loveland (Loveland, Colorado)
- College: Colorado A&M (1947–1950)
- NFL draft: 1951: 6th round, 67th overall pick

Career history

Playing
- Pittsburgh Steelers (1951–1959)

Coaching
- Denver Broncos (1960–1963, 1966) Line coach

Awards and highlights
- First-team All-Pro (1954); 2× Second-team All-Pro (1953, 1956); 4× Pro Bowl (1954, 1955, 1956, 1958); Pittsburgh Steelers Legends team

Career NFL statistics
- Interceptions: 10
- Fumble recoveries: 11
- Total touchdowns: 2
- Stats at Pro Football Reference

Dale Fike Dodrill (February 7, 1926 – January 18, 2019) was an American professional football player who was a defensive tackle for nine seasons with the Pittsburgh Steelers of the National Football League (NFL). He played college football for the Colorado A&M Aggies (now Colorado State Rams).

== Early life ==
Dodrill was born to George Dodrill and Lettie (Fike) Dodrill on February 27, 1926, in Stockton, Kansas. The family farmed in Rooks County, Kansas and Dale attended Plainville, Kansas schools. In 1937, the Dodrill family moved to Fort Collins, Colorado and then to Loveland, Colorado. In 1942, Dodrill played on the Loveland High School state championship football team. Dodrill was selected into the United States Army right out of high school, serving in the 30th Infantry Division during World War II. Dodrill's brother Garrett died in a prison camp in the Philippines during the war.

== College career ==
In 1947, Dodrill enrolled at Colorado A&M (Colorado State University) to play football for the Rams. Dodrill played both sides of the ball for the Rams helping the team to its first post season appearance, the 1949 Raisin Bowl. Dodrill was selected All-Skyline Athletic Conference in 1948, 1949 and 1950. He was selected to play in the East-West Shrine game in 1949 and the College All-Star game in 1951. In 1952, Dodrill won the Nye Trophy as the most outstanding Colorado State male athlete. Dodrill was inducted into the Colorado Sports Hall of Fame in 1993.

== Professional career ==
Dodrill was drafted by the Pittsburgh Steelers 67th overall in the sixth round of the 1951 NFL draft. During his nine-year career with the Pittsburgh Steelers, Dodrill posted career numbers of 10 interceptions and 11 recovered fumbles. One fumble recovery was returned for a touchdown. Dodrill was voted to the NFL Pro Bowl four times (1954, 1955, 1956, 1958) and named First-team All-Pro in 1954.

In 2007, Dodrill was honored by the Pittsburgh Steelers during their 75th Season Celebration. Dodrill was named to the Pittsburgh Steelers Legends team as one of the Steelers’ best players from the pre-1970 era. Dodrill was inducted into the Pittsburgh Pro Football Hall of Fame in 2016.

== Coaching career ==
After retiring from pro football, Dodrill coached the defensive line for the Denver Broncos from 1960 to 1963 and again in 1966.

== Later and personal life ==
Dodrill married Janette Briggs on February 28, 1954. The couple has three sons, Garrett, Michael and David. In 1961, Dodrill started Dodrill Insurance in Denver, Colorado. After building a successful business, Dodrill sold Dodrill Insurance to his sons in 1991. Michael died in 1964 and Janette in 2015.
