= Will Sherman (defensive back) =

American football player (1927–1997)

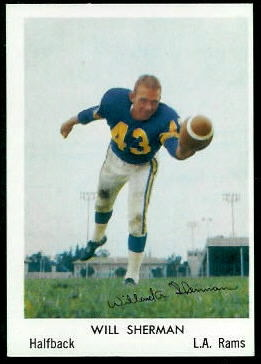
- Sherman in 1959

No. 45, 88, 43
- Position: Defensive back

Personal information
- Born: October 20, 1927; Weed, California, U.S.
- Died: October 11, 1997 (aged 69)
- Listed height: 6 ft 2 in (1.88 m)
- Listed weight: 190 lb (86 kg)

Career information
- High school: Yreka (Yreka, California)
- College: Saint Mary's (CA)
- NFL draft: 1951: 26th round, 311th overall pick

Career history
- Dallas Texans (1952); Calgary Stampeders (1953); Los Angeles Rams (1954–1960); Minnesota Vikings (1961)

Awards and highlights
- First-team All-Pro (1955); Second-team All-Pro (1958); 2× Pro Bowl (1955, 1958)

Career NFL statistics
- Interceptions: 29
- Fumble recoveries: 2
- Total touchdowns: 4
- Stats at Pro Football Reference

Willard Arthur Sherman (October 20, 1927 – October 11, 1997) was an American professional football player who was a defensive back in the National Football League (NFL), primarily with the Los Angeles Rams from 1954 to 1960. He played college football for the Saint Mary's Gaels.
