= Rosey Brown =

American football player (1932–2004)

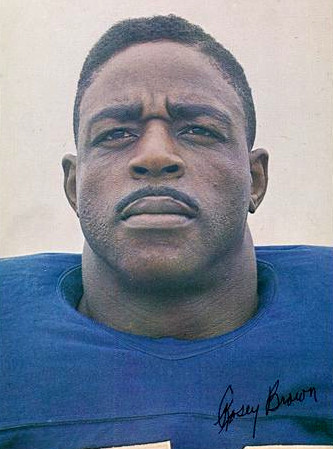
- Brown with the New York Giants c. 1965

No. 79
- Position: Offensive tackle

Personal information
- Born: October 20, 1932; Charlottesville, Virginia, U.S.
- Died: June 9, 2004 (aged 71); Columbus, New Jersey, U.S.
- Listed height: 6 ft 3 in (1.91 m)
- Listed weight: 255 lb (116 kg)

Career information
- High school: Jefferson (Charlottesville)
- College: Morgan State (1951–1952)
- NFL draft: 1953: 27th round, 321st overall pick

Career history

Playing
- New York Giants (1953–1965)

Coaching
- New York Giants (1966–1968) Assistant offensive line coach; New York Giants (1969–1970) Offensive line coach

Awards and highlights
- NFL champion (1956); 6× First-team All-Pro (1956–1959, 1961, 1962); 3× Second-team All-Pro (1960, 1963, 1965); 9× Pro Bowl (1955–1960, 1962, 1964, 1965); NFL 1950s All-Decade Team; NFL 75th Anniversary All-Time Team; NFL 100th Anniversary All-Time Team; New York Giants Ring of Honor; 2nd greatest New York Giant of all-time

Career NFL statistics
- Games played: 162
- Games started: 161
- Fumble recoveries: 5
- Stats at Pro Football Reference
- Pro Football Hall of Fame

Roosevelt Brown Jr. (October 20, 1932 – June 9, 2004) was an American professional football offensive tackle who played in the National Football League (NFL) for the New York Giants from 1953 to 1965. He played college football for the Morgan State Bears and was selected by the Giants in the 27th round of the 1953 NFL draft.

Brown appeared in 162 games for the Giants, missing only four games in a 13-year career. In his prime, between 1956 and 1963, he helped lead the Giants to six division championships and the 1956 NFL Championship Game. He was selected as a first-team All-Pro player eight consecutive years and was also selected to play in the Pro Bowl nine times.

After retiring as a player, Brown remained with the Giants as an assistant coach and later as a scout. He was inducted into the Pro Football Hall of Fame in 1975, was named to the National Football League 75th Anniversary All-Time Team in 1994 and was named to the NFL 100th Anniversary All-Time Team in 2019. He was also included on the NFL 1950s All-Decade Team and The Sporting News' list of the 100 Greatest Football Players.

== Early life ==
Brown was born in Charlottesville, Virginia, in 1932. Brown recalled his youth as follows:

I was always a big boy. When I was 6, my mother put me in school and I took a test. I must have passed it because they put me in third grade. No first grade and no second grade. That meant I graduated from high school when I was 15 and from college at 19. When I played my first game for the Giants, in 1953, I was still 19.

He attended Jefferson High School, the African American high school in Charlottesville. He played trombone in the school's band, having been forbidden to play football after his older brother was injured playing the sport and died. The school's football coach, Robert W. Smith, ultimately persuaded the 180-pound Brown to play football, though he did so initially without his father's knowledge. Coach Smith said, "The band director almost wanted to fight me for him. He said that 'Rosey' would be a great trumpet player, and I said he'd be a great blocker. I just couldn't see a 210 pound kid playing the trumpet."

== College career ==
After graduating from high school, Brown attended Morgan State College, a historically black college in Baltimore, on a scholarship to play for the Morgan State Bears football team under head coach Edward P. Hurt. He was selected as an All-Central Intercollegiate Athletic Association player in both 1951 and 1952, and was a co-captain of the 1952 Morgan State team that compiled a 5–4 record.

In December 1952, he was selected by the Pittsburgh Courier as a first-team offensive tackle on its 1952 All-America team. The Courier cited Brown's ability to open holes for Morgan State's backs and quoted Morgan State coach Hurt saying, "It is my considered opinion that Roosevelt Brown is the best tackle developed at Morgan State in recent years. He has weight, speed and aggressiveness. If some pro team doesn't pick him, it will be missing a bet."

== Professional career ==
=== Signing and rookie season ===
In January 1953, the New York Giants selected Brown in the 27th round (321st overall pick) of the 1953 NFL draft. The Giants drafted Brown after seeing him featured in the Pittsburgh Courier's All-American team. Brown signed a one-year contract for $3,500 on March 25, 1953. Having been picked as the 321st player in the draft, he is considered "one of the biggest steals in draft history."

As a rookie, Brown appeared in all 12 games for a Giants team that compiled a 3–9 record during the 1953 season. In October 1953, sports writer Earl Wright wrote of Brown: "He is built like a museum statue – slender hips and broad shoulders. But he is no statue on the field. He surprised the Giants by outrunning Arnie Weinmeister, New York's fleet defensive tackle, in windsprints." Brown also gained attention as a rookie for his style, wearing "fancy street clothing" and regularly sporting a mustache, derby hat and umbrella.

=== 1954 and 1955 seasons ===
Brown again started all 12 games for the 1954 and 1955 Giants teams that compiled records of 7–5 and 6–5–1. The Giants teams during these years was overwhelmingly white, and Brown spent most of his time with Emlen Tunnell, the other African-American starter on the team. The two were roommates in New York. On the road, team owner Wellington Mara arranged for the two to stay in private homes with black families rather than staying in the hotels with the white players. Brown later recalled this as a benefit during segregation:

[W]e loved it! Hell, we didn't have curfews like the others had. We could do just about anything we wanted to do and didn't have any coaches to check on us. We could drink beer in our rooms, have people in, party it up. We had the best deal. It made me kind of angry when segregation ended and we had to stay with the white boys.

=== 1956 NFL championship ===
In 1956, the Giants compiled an 8–3–1 record and won the 1956 NFL Championship Game. Brown played a key role for the Giants' championship team, blocking for the team's backs Frank Gifford (819 rushing yards), Alex Webster (694 rushing yards), and Mel Triplett (515 rushing yards). Sports writer Murray Olderman wrote: "The New York Giants have football's greatest ground threat, and Roosevelt Brown, an ultra-fast 245-pounder, is an integral part of it." Gifford, the NFL's Most Valuable Player in 1956, later said: "I wouldn't be in the Hall of Fame if it weren't for him. ... The longest run of my career was on a pitchout against Washington. Rosie made a block at the line of scrimmage. I cut it up, and then I'm running downfield and I look up and I see No. 79 in front of me, and he wiped out another guy."

At the end of the 1956 season, Brown was unanimously selected as a first-team All-NFL player by the Associated Press (AP), United Press (UP), NEA, The Sporting News, and New York Daily News. Brown was one of only two players to be chosen by all 28 AP voters as a first-team All-NFL player. He was also received the NFL's Lineman of the Year award.

=== 1957–1965 ===
Brown remained a fixture in the Giants' offensive line through the 1965 season. In his prime, between 1956 and 1963, he helped lead the team to six division championships and one NFL championship. Brown was known primarily as an offensive tackle but also played on the Giants' kickoff, kickoff return, punt, punt return, and field goal attempt platoons. He was also known on defense as the "head 'traffic cop' on New York's last-ditch 'goal-line stand' platoon."

Brown was also known for his physique. A 1964 article in The New York Times noted:

His neck, shoulders and chest are massive. But the body tapers in a heroic way. His waist and buttocks, in proportion to what's above, are small. Then come the legs, similarly massive. ... A lady of certain artistic talent has tried numerous times to capture Rosey Brown on her sketch pad. She has never been satisfied with the results. 'I'm not worthy of the subject,' she has said. 'I leave him to Michelangelo.'

In November 1964, at age 32, Brown acknowledged that time was catching up with him: "You lose a step and you're done. You know how to do things, but you can't do them any more." Brown lasted one more year, appearing in all 14 games for the 1965 Giants.

In all, Brown appeared in 162 games for the Giants, missing only four games during his 13-year NFL career. Brown was selected as a first-team All-NFL player eight times during his NFL career: 1956 (AP, UPI, NEA, Sporting News); 1957 (AP, UPI, NEA, Sporting News); 1958 (AP, UPI, NEA, Sporting News); 1959 (AP, UPI, NEA, Sporting News); 1960 (UPI, Sporting News); 1961 (AP, UPI, NEA, Sporting News); 1962 (AP, UPI); and 1963 (UPI, NEA). He was also selected to play in the Pro Bowl nine times: 1955, 1956, 1957, 1958, 1959, 1960, 1962, 1964, and 1965.

While playing with the Giants, Brown and his wife Thelma were residents of Teaneck, New Jersey, where they were neighbors of New York Yankees catcher Elston Howard.

== Coaching and scouting career ==
In March 1966, Brown was hospitalized with phlebitis, calling into doubt his ability to continue his playing career. Brown participated in the Giants' summer camp, but on August 23, 1966, he announced his retirement as a player. The Giants announced at the same time that the team had hired Brown as an assistant coach. He became the Giants' assistant offensive line coach and was promoted to offensive line coach in 1969. He later worked as a scout for the Giants. As a player, coach and scout, his career with the Giants spanned more than 50 years.

== Honors and halls of fame ==
Brown received numerous honors for his contributions to the sport. His honors include the following:

- In August 1969, he was named to the NFL's 1950s All-Decade Team.
- In 1974, he was inducted into the Morgan State University Hall of Fame.
- In January 1975, Brown was named to the Pro Football Hall of Fame.
- In April 1979, he was inducted into the Virginia Sports Hall of Fame.
- In August 1994, he was named to the National Football League 75th Anniversary All-Time Team selected by a 15-person panel of NFL and Pro Football Hall of Fame officials, former players, and media representatives.
- In August 1999, Brown was ranked number 57 on The Sporting News' list of the 100 Greatest Football Players.
- In 2010, he was included in the inaugural class of the New York Giants Ring of Honor.
- In 2019 he was named to the 100 year NFL team

== Family and death ==
In June 2004, Brown suffered a heart attack while gardening and died at his home in the Columbus section of Mansfield Township, Burlington County, New Jersey, at age 71. He was survived by his wife, the former Linda Lock, two stepchildren, and two sisters.
