= Gene Brito =

American football player (1925–1965)

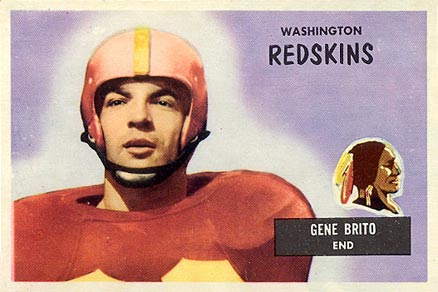
- Brito on a 1955 Bowman football card

No. 80, 79
- Positions: Defensive end End

Personal information
- Born: November 23, 1925; Huntington Park, California, U.S.
- Died: June 8, 1965 (aged 39); Duarte, California, U.S.
- Listed height: 6 ft 1 in (1.85 m)
- Listed weight: 226 lb (103 kg)

Career information
- High school: Abraham Lincoln (Los Angeles, California)
- College: Loyola–Los Angeles (1947–1950)
- NFL draft: 1951: 17th round, 196th overall pick

Career history
- Washington Redskins (1951–1953); Calgary Stampeders (1954); Washington Redskins (1955–1958); Los Angeles Rams (1959–1960)

Awards and highlights
- NFL: DC TD Club NFL MVP (1955); 4× First-team All-Pro (1955–1958); Second-team All-Pro (1960); 5× Pro Bowl (1953, 1955–1958); 80 Greatest Redskins; Washington Commanders Ring of Fame; CFL: CFL All-Conference (1954)

Career NFL statistics
- Fumble recoveries: 11
- Receptions: 47
- Receiving yards: 618
- Total touchdowns: 2
- Stats at Pro Football Reference

Gene Herman Brito (October 23, 1925 – June 8, 1965) was an American professional football player who was a defensive end for nine seasons in the National Football League (NFL) with the Washington Redskins and the Los Angeles Rams from 1951 to 1960. He played college football for the Loyola Lions.

== Early career ==
Brito, born to a Spanish-American father and Mexican-American mother, grew up in Lincoln Heights, a then mostly Italian American neighborhood, located in Los Angeles. His father was a boxer, and he had two younger sisters. Brito attended Lincoln High School where he was a standout athlete.

== College career ==
Brito graduated from Loyola Marymount University (then Loyola University) as a multi-sport athlete, starring in football, baseball, basketball, and track.

== Professional career ==
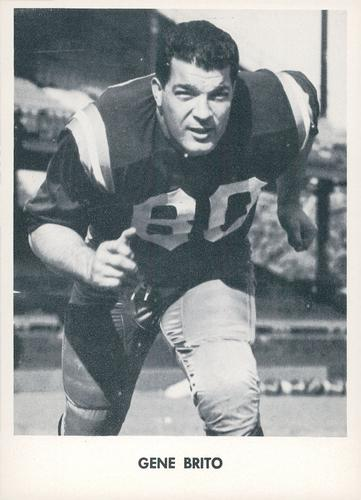
Brito in 1958

Brito began his career as an offensive end right as he was about to turn 26, catching 45 passes in his first two seasons before being moved to defensive end in 1953. He was named the NFL Player of the Year by the Washington D.C. Touchdown Club after the 1955 season. Brito played in the Canadian Football League for the Calgary Stampeders in 1954 where he was an All-conference selection in the CFL's Western Conference. In the NFL, he was a five-time Pro Bowler in 1953 and from 1955 to 1958. He was selected as one of the 70 Greatest Redskins, a list compiled by the Redskins in 2002 to commemorate the 70-year anniversary of the team. He is one of four defensive ends on the team, along with Dexter Manley, Ron McDole and Charles Mann. In 2004, he was named to the Professional Football Researchers Association Hall of Very Good in the association's second HOVG class.

== Personal life ==
Brito was a staff sergeant in the U. S. Army and an Army paratrooper with U.S. forces in the Pacific during World War II.

Brito was elected posthumously to the National Italian American Sports Hall of Fame in 1989. He hosted "The Gene Brito Show" which aired prior to Redskins games in the 1950s making him one of the first NFL athletes to host a show and making him the most popular Redskins of his era. He was then-President John F. Kennedy's favorite player. Brito died on June 8, 1965, of ALS at the age of 39. During an August 1971 visit to the Hall of Fame Game in Canton, Ohio, President Richard Nixon, who had been friendly with Kennedy during their congressional years, told sportscaster Frank Gifford that he considered Brito a candidate for enshrinement at the Pro Football Hall of Fame.
