= Herman Clark =

American football player (1930–1989)

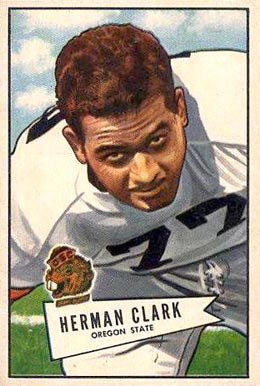
- Clark on a 1952 Bowman football card

No. 74, 65
- Positions: Guard, linebacker

Personal information
- Born: November 30, 1930; Honolulu, Hawaii, U.S.
- Died: October 9, 1989 (aged 58); Molokai, Hawaii, U.S.
- Listed height: 6 ft 3 in (1.91 m)
- Listed weight: 256 lb (116 kg)

Career information
- High school: Punahou School (Honolulu)
- College: Oregon State (1948–1951)
- NFL draft: 1952: 4th round, 44th overall pick

Career history
- Chicago Bears (1952, 1954–1957)

Awards and highlights
- First-team All-PCC (1951)

Career NFL statistics
- Games played: 53
- Games started: 49
- Fumble recoveries: 3
- Stats at Pro Football Reference

Herman Piikea Clark (November 30, 1930 – October 9, 1989) was an American professional football tackle who played for the Chicago Bears in 1952 and from 1954 to 1957. He played college football at Oregon State University, and played in 52 games over five seasons for the Bears.

Both Herman and Jim Clark were drafted in the 1952 NFL draft.

The Hawaiian-born Clark played collegiately for Oregon State in a position which would today be categorized as right defensive end, next to his brother Jim Clark, who played what would today be called right defensive tackle.
