= Bill George (linebacker) =

American football player (1929–1982)

- George while at Wake Forest

No. 72, 61
- Positions: Linebacker, guard, defensive tackle

Personal information
- Born: October 27, 1929; Waynesburg, Pennsylvania, U.S.
- Died: September 30, 1982 (aged 52); Rockford, Illinois, U.S.
- Listed height: 6 ft 2 in (1.88 m)
- Listed weight: 237 lb (108 kg)

Career information
- High school: Waynesburg Central
- College: Wake Forest (1947–1950)
- NFL draft: 1951: 2nd round, 23rd overall pick

Career history

Playing
- Chicago Bears (1952–1965); Los Angeles Rams (1966)

Coaching
- Chicago Bears (1972) Linebackers / defensive backs coach

Awards and highlights
- NFL champion (1963); 8× First-team All-Pro (1955–1961, 1963); 8× Pro Bowl (1954–1961); NFL 1950s All-Decade Team; Chicago Bears No. 61 retired; 100 greatest Bears of All-Time; Wake Forest Demon Deacons No. 47 retired

Career NFL statistics
- Games played: 173
- Games started: 170
- Interceptions: 18
- Sacks: 28.5
- Fumble recoveries: 19
- Stats at Pro Football Reference
- Pro Football Hall of Fame

Medal record

Collegiate Wrestling

Representing the Wake Forest Demon Deacons

SoCon Championships
Gold medal – first place	1948 Lexington	Heavyweight
Gold medal – first place	1949 Lexington	Heavyweight
Gold medal – first place	1952 Lexington	Heavyweight

William J. George (October 27, 1929 – September 30, 1982) was an American professional football linebacker who played for the Chicago Bears and the Los Angeles Rams of the National Football League (NFL).

George was born in Waynesburg, Pennsylvania, about 50 miles south of Pittsburgh. He is among numerous legendary football players born in football-rich Western Pennsylvania. He played college football for the Wake Forest Demon Deacons and was the Bears second-round draft pick in 1951.

== College career ==
During his time playing at Wake Forest, George became the first All-American football player in team history and was a three-time selection to the All-Southern Conference Team. George was also a standout wrestler in high school and although Wake Forest did not field a wrestling team, he entered the Southern Conference wrestling tournament as an individual competitor without a team and won on three occasions at heavyweight. He was inducted into the Wake Forest Sports Hall of Fame in 1998.

== Professional career ==
He began his professional football career in 1952 as a middle guard in the then-standard five-man defensive front. He was selected to play in eight consecutive Pro Bowls, from 1954 to 1961. George is credited as the first true middle linebacker in football history and, inadvertently, the creator of the 4–3 defense. Noting during a 1954 game with the Philadelphia Eagles that his tendency to hit the center right after the snap led to the quarterback passing right over his head, he began to drop back from the line, not only enabling him to intercept and otherwise disrupt several passes from that game forward but also creating the familiar 4–3 setup (four linemen and three linebackers).

Hall of Famer Art Donovan had this to say about Bill George: "It's real hard to make the call, but the best linebacker I've ever seen play may have been the Bears' George. He was wild; he'd psyche himself up into a frenzy when he played. Then you'd meet him off the field and he was a completely different guy, another Clark Kent. And he'd line up anywhere on the field.... Quarterbacks would be going out of their mind looking to find out where the hell Bill George was."

In addition to his 18 career interceptions, George also recovered 19 fumbles, and in 1954 scored 25 points on 13 extra points and four field goals. In 1963, he led the Bears defense when they won the NFL Championship.

== After football ==
George was elected to the Pro Football Hall of Fame in 1974. The Bears retired his uniform number 61. Three of his successors as Chicago middle linebackers are also in the Hall of Fame: Dick Butkus (1965–1973), Mike Singletary (1981–1992) and Brian Urlacher (2000–2012).

In a 1989 article, in which he named his choices for the best athletes ever to wear each uniform number from 0 to 99, Sports Illustrated columnist Rick Reilly not only chose George for number 61, but called him "the meanest Bear ever", no small thing considering the franchise's long history and reputation for toughness. In 1999, he was ranked number 49 on The Sporting News list of the 100 Greatest Football Players.

== Death ==
George was killed in an automobile accident in Rockford, Illinois on September 30, 1982. He was buried at Evergreen Cemetery in Barrington, Illinois.

== Bibliography ==
- Carroll, Bob, Gershman, Michael, Neft, David, and Thorn, John, Total Football II: The Official Encyclopedia of the National Football League, HarperCollins, 1999, page 822.
- Halas, George, Morgan, Gwen, and Veysey, Arthur, Halas by Halas, McGraw-Hill, 1979.
- Rand, Jonathan, Riddell Presents The Gridiron's Greatest Linebackers, Sports Publishing, 2003.
- Youmans, Gary and Youmans, Maury, '63, The Story of the 1963 World Champion Chicago Bears, Campbell Road Press, 2004.
