= Emlen Tunnell =

American football player and coach (1924–1975)

No. 45
- Positions: Safety, return specialist

Personal information
- Born: March 29, 1924; Bryn Mawr, Pennsylvania, U.S.
- Died: July 23, 1975 (aged 51); Pleasantville, New York, U.S.
- Listed height: 6 ft 1 in (1.85 m)
- Listed weight: 187 lb (85 kg)

Career information
- High school: Radnor (Radnor, Pennsylvania)
- College: Toledo (1942); San Francisco Coast Guard (1944); Iowa (1946–1947)
- NFL draft: 1948: undrafted

Career history

Playing
- New York Giants (1948–1958); Green Bay Packers (1959–1961)

Coaching
- Green Bay Packers (1962) Scout; New York Giants (1962) Scout; New York Giants (1963–1964) Special assistant coach; New York Giants (1965–1974) Defensive backs coach

Awards and highlights
- 2× NFL champion (1956, 1961); 6× First-team All-Pro (1949, 1951, 1952, 1954–1956); 9× Pro Bowl (1950–1957, 1959); 2× NFL punt return yards leader (1951, 1952); NFL 1950s All-Decade Team; NFL 50th Anniversary All-Time Team; NFL 100th Anniversary All-Time Team; New York Giants Ring of Honor; 6th greatest New York Giant of all-time

Career NFL statistics
- Interceptions: 79
- Interception yards: 1,282
- Fumble recoveries: 16
- Defensive touchdowns: 4
- Punt return yards: 2,209
- Punt return touchdowns: 5
- Kickoff return yards: 1,215
- Kickoff return touchdowns: 1
- Stats at Pro Football Reference
- Pro Football Hall of Fame

Emlen Lewis Tunnell (March 29, 1924 – July 23, 1975), nicknamed "the Gremlin", was an American professional football player and coach. He was the first African American to play for the New York Giants and also the first to be inducted into the Pro Football Hall of Fame.

Born and raised in the Philadelphia area, Tunnell played college football for the Toledo Rockets in 1942, the San Francisco Coast Guard Pilots in 1944, and the Iowa Hawkeyes in 1946 and 1947. He also served in the United States Coast Guard from 1943 to 1946. He received the Silver Lifesaving Medal for heroism in rescuing a shipmate from flames during a torpedo attack in 1944 and rescuing another shipmate who fell into the sea in 1946.

He next played 14 seasons in the National Football League (NFL) as a safety and return specialist for the New York Giants (1948–1958) and the Green Bay Packers (1959–1961). He was selected as a first-team All-Pro six times and played in nine Pro Bowls. He was a member of NFL championship teams in 1956 and 1961. When he retired as a player, he held NFL career records for interceptions with 79, interception return yards with 1,282, punt returns (258), and punt return yards (2,209). He is widely considered one of the greatest undrafted players in NFL history.

After retiring as a player, Tunnell served as a special assistant coach and defensive backs coach for the New York Giants from 1963 to 1974. In addition to the Pro Football Hall of Fame, he was named to the NFL 1950s All-Decade Team and the all-time All-Pro team, and was ranked number 70 on The Sporting News' list of the 100 Greatest Football Players.

== Early life ==
Tunnell was born in Bryn Mawr, Pennsylvania, though sources conflict as to his year of birth. His tombstone as well as the Social Security Death Index and Tunnell's Department of Veterans Affairs BIRLS Death File reflect a birth date of March 29, 1924. Official NFL records and multiple sources in the early 1960s reported his date of birth as March 29, 1922. Tunnell listed his birth date as March 29, 1923, on his 1942 draft card and on his 1950 application for World War II benefits. Other sources record his birth year as 1925. In 1961, Tunnell joked about his age: "I'm not really 41, as everyone says. I'm closer to 42."

Tunnell grew up in the Garrett Hill neighborhood of Radnor Township, approximately eight miles northwest of Philadelphia. His parents were divorced when Tunnell was young, and he and three siblings were raised by his mother, Catherine, who worked as a housekeeper in the homes of wealthy families in the Philadelphia Main Line area. His sister, Vivian, recalled Garrett Hill as a multi-ethnic neighborhood where "everybody mingled", and her brother "learned from his environment – be yourself, but adapt to others who might be different in the group."

Tunnell attended Radnor High School where he was a star halfback in 1940 and 1941.

Tunnell was included in the inaugural class of inductees to the Radnor High School Hall of Fame in 2003. In 2023, the road that runs through the school's campus was renamed "Emlen Tunnell Way" in his honor.

== College and military service ==
=== Toledo ===
Tunnell enrolled at the University of Toledo in the fall of 1942 and played college football as a halfback for Toledo Rockets football team. He was described as the "main spring" of Toledo's offense in the first part of the 1942 season. However, on October 26, 1942, he sustained a broken neck in a game when he was blocked while attempting to make a tackle against Marshall. He recuperated sufficiently to help lead the Toledo Rockets men's basketball team to the finals of the 1943 National Invitation Tournament.

=== Coast Guard ===
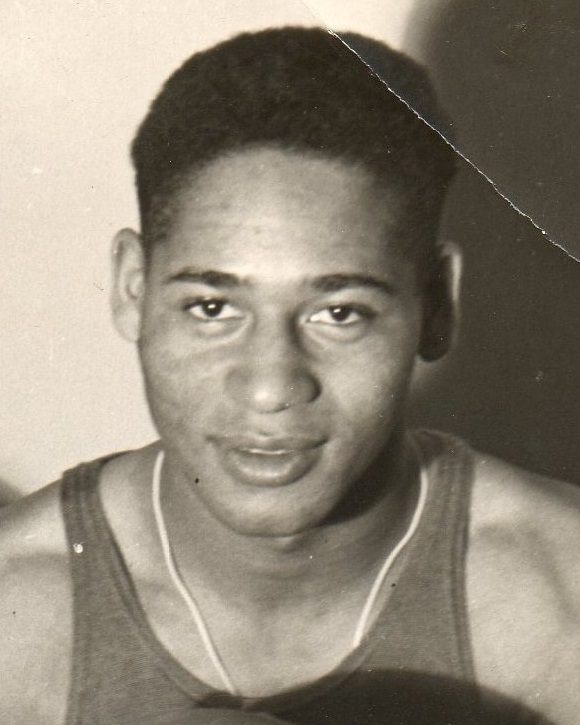
Tunnell played basketball for the racially integrated District 12 team at Coast Guard Station Alameda in 1943.

Tunnell's neck injury in 1942 resulted in his being rejected in efforts to enlist in both the United States Army and Navy during World War II. In May 1943, Tunnell enlisted in the United States Coast Guard. From August 1943 to July 1944, he served on the USS Etamin, a cargo ship that was crewed by Coast Guard personnel and stationed in the South West Pacific Area. In April 1944, while unloading explosives and gasoline at Aitape in Papua New Guinea, the Etamin was struck by a torpedo dropped from a Japanese airplane; Tunnell saved a fellow crew member who was set afire in the blast, beat out the flames with his hands, sustained burns to his own hands, and carried the shipmate to safety. He was next stationed at San Francisco and Alameda from August 1944 to October 1945.

In the fall of 1944, Tunnell played at the halfback position for the San Francisco Coast Guard Pilots football team. On November 11, 1944, he led the Pilots to a 13–0 victory over Amos Alonzo Stagg's Pacific Tigers football team, throwing 22 yards for a touchdown and returning an interception 75 yards for another touchdown. At the end of the 1944 season, he was named to the All-Pacific Coast service football team. He also played basketball for the San Francisco Coast Guard, scoring 13 points in a December 1944 game against the California Golden Bears.

USCGC Emlen Tunnell (WPC-1145)

In March 1946, while stationed at Naval Station Argentia in Newfoundland, Tunnell rescued a shipmate who fell from the USS Tampa. Tunnell jumped into the 32-degree water and saved his drowning shipmate. In 2011, Tunnell was posthumously recognized by having the gymnasium on Coast Guard Island named in his honor and was awarded the Silver Lifesaving Medal for his heroism in rescuing his shipmate on the Tampa.

On December 12, 2017, the Coast Guard announced that it planned to name its 45th Sentinel class cutter the USCGC Emlen Tunnell. In 2021, the Coast Guard announced plans to name an athletic building on the Coast Guard Academy campus the Emlen Tunnell Strength and Conditioning Center.

=== Iowa ===
Tunnell was honorably discharged from the Coast Guard in April 1946. He enrolled at the University of Iowa in the fall of 1946. Playing for the 1946 Iowa football team, Tunnell led the team with 541 yards of total offense and 28 pass completions and ranked second on the team with 333 rushing yards.

On October 11, 1947, he set an Iowa single-game record with 155 receiving yards and three touchdowns on six receptions. Three weeks later, Tunnell quit the team after an argument with backfield coach Frank Carideo. He apologized and was reinstated two days later, but he played "sparingly" in the final two games of the 1947 season.

Tunnell left Iowa in January 1948 in order to make some money to enable him to return and play football in the fall. He was told by school officials that, in order to be eligible to play football again in the fall, he would need to return for summer school and make up for a class he failed in the fall. Tunnell later explained: "I got a telegram on Sunday saying I had to be back in school on Monday and didn't have any money or nothing."

== Professional football player ==
=== New York Giants ===
On July 24, 1948, Tunnell signed with the New York Giants. He was the first black player signed by, and the first to play for, the Giants. He later wrote that he hitchhiked from his family home in Garrett Hill to New York City to meet Jack Mara, son of Giants founder Tim Mara, and ask for a try out. In his Hall of Fame induction speech, Tunnell thanked a West Indian banana-truck driver who dropped him off near this Polo Grounds "appointment".

As a rookie in 1948, Tunnell appeared in 10 games and intercepted seven passes, including one returned 43 yards for a touchdown. Between 1949 and 1952, he was known as one of the best pass defenders and punt returners in the NFL. He was a key element in the Giants' famed "umbrella defense" that shut down the passing game of opponents in the early 1950s, and he was referred to as the Giants' "offense on defense". His accomplishments during those prime years include the following:

- In 1949, he was selected as an All-NFL/AAFC player by the International News Service. He led the NFL with two interceptions returned for touchdown and three non-offensive touchdowns. He ranked second in the NFL with 315 punt returns yards and 251 interception return yards and third with 10 interceptions.
- In 1950, he ranked second in the NFL with 305 punt return yards and fourth with 167 interception return yards.
- In 1951, he was selected as a first-team All-Pro by the Associated Press (AP) and United Press (UP). He led the NFL with a career-high 489 punt return yards and four non-offensive touchdowns. He returned a kickoff 100 yards for a touchdown, and his combined total of 716 kick and punt return yards was second best in the NFL. His 37.8 yards per kick return and three punt returns for touchdowns remain Giants franchise records. His nine interceptions and average of 14.4 yards per punt return both ranked third in the NFL.
- In 1952, he was again selected as a first-team All-Pro by the AP and UP. He led the NFL with six fumble recoveries and 411 punt return yards and averaged 13.7 yards per return. He also ranked among the league leaders with seven interceptions and 149 interception return yards. He gained more yards (924) returning interceptions, punts, and kickoffs than the 1952 NFL rushing leader, Dan Towler.

Tunnell remained with the Giants for a total of 11 years from 1948 to 1958. During that time, he was selected as a first-team All-Pro six times, played in eight Pro Bowls, and set franchise records that still stand with 74 intercepted passes for 1,240 interception return yards and four touchdowns (tied with Dick Lynch and Jason Sehorn). He also recovered 15 fumbles and still holds franchise records with 257 punt returns for 2,206 yards and five touchdowns, which was good for an average of 8.6 yards per return. His total of 3,421 return yards is also a franchise record.

=== Green Bay Packers ===
After the 1958 season, the Giants' offensive coordinator Vince Lombardi left New York to become head coach and general manager of the Green Bay Packers. In June 1959, the Packers, in one of their first major personnel moves under Lombardi, purchased Tunnell from the Giants. In three years with the Packers, Tunnell saw reduced playing time, but helped to bolster the defense with his experience, worked to develop the team's young players, and became known as "an unofficial pastor" for the team. He appeared in 13 games for the 1961 Packers team that won the NFL championship. He saw playing time in red zone defensive situations. Defensive backs coach Norb Hecker said of Tunnell: "He was still a vicious tackler. When the opposition got inside our 15, we put him in and he responded with the fury of a linebacker. He could fall back on experience and by watching an offensive player's move was seldom beat."

=== Career accomplishments and honors ===
In March 1962, Tunnell announced his retirement as a player. At that time, he held several NFL records, including the following:

- His 79 career interceptions were an NFL record and remain second most in NFL history, having been surpassed in 1979 by fellow Iowa Hawkeye Paul Krause.
- His 1,282 interception return yards were an NFL record for four decades and rank fifth in NFL history as of 2017.
- His 258 punt returns were an NFL record, but rank 19th in league history as of 2017.
- His 2,209 punt return yards were an NFL record, but rank 30th as of 2017.
- He played in 158 consecutive games which was also an NFL record when he retired as a player.

During his 14-year NFL career, Tunnell also totaled 16 fumble recoveries, 8.6 yards per punt return, and 1,215 yards on 46 kickoff returns (26.4 yards per return).

Tunnell has received numerous honors for his contributions to the sport, including the following:

- In February 1967, he was elected to the Pro Football Hall of Fame. He was the first African American and the first player who played strictly as a defensive back to be inducted.
- In August 1969, he was named to the NFL's 1950s All-Decade Team as a safety.
- In September 1969, he was one of 16 players named to the all-time All-Pro team selected by the Pro Football Hall of Fame.
- In March 1975, he was inducted into the Iowa Sports Hall of Fame.
- In August 1999, he was ranked number 70 on The Sporting News' list of the 100 Greatest Football Players.
- In 2010, he was one of the 22 players included in the New York Giants Ring of Honor at MetLife Stadium.
- Also in 2010, the NFL Network ranked Tunnell 79th on its list of the 100 greatest players of all time.
- In 2014, he was ranked as the second greatest player in New York Giants history in the book, "The 50 Greatest Players in New York Giants Football History".

On June 2, 2018, a statue of Tunnell was installed in Delaware County, Pennsylvania.

== Coaching and family ==
Tunnell was married in 1962 to Patricia Dawkins. They had no children.

In the fall of 1962, Tunnell worked as a scout for the Giants and Packers, observing college players on Saturdays and watching the Giants' upcoming opponents on Sundays. In May 1963, he was hired by the Giants as a special assistant coach under head coach Allie Sherman. In addition to his scouting duties, he was responsible for "special assignments" during the Giants' training camp.

In February 1965, Tunnell was promoted to assistant coach responsible for the Giants' defensive backs. While some sources credit Tunnell as the first African American to work as an assistant coach in the NFL, and even as the first black coach in the NFL, Fritz Pollard was a head coach in the NFL in the 1920s, and Lowell Perry was an assistant coach for the Pittsburgh Steelers in 1957.

Tunnell suffered a minor heart attack in October 1974 and thereafter assumed a new position as the Giants' assistant personnel director. In July 1975, Tunnell died from a heart attack during a Giants practice session at Pace University in Pleasantville, New York.
