= Art Donovan =

American football player (1924–2013)

- Donovan in 1960

No. 49, 39, 70
- Positions: Defensive tackle, tackle

Personal information
- Born: June 5, 1924; The Bronx, New York, U.S.
- Died: August 4, 2013 (aged 89); Baltimore, Maryland, U.S.
- Listed height: 6 ft 2 in (1.88 m)
- Listed weight: 263 lb (119 kg)

Career information
- High school: Mount Saint Michael Academy (The Bronx)
- College: Notre Dame; Boston College
- NFL draft: 1947: 22nd round, 204th overall pick

Career history
- Baltimore Colts (1950); New York Yanks (1951); Dallas Texans (1952); Baltimore Colts (1953–1961)

Awards and highlights
- 2× NFL champion (1958, 1959); 4× First-team All-Pro (1954–1957); 2× Second-team All-Pro (1958, 1960); 5× Pro Bowl (1953–1957); NFL 1950s All-Decade Team; Baltimore Ravens Ring of Honor; Indianapolis Colts No. 70 retired; Boston College Eagles Jersey retired

Career NFL statistics
- Games played: 138
- Games started: 136
- Fumble recoveries: 8
- Military career
- Allegiance: United States
- Branch: U.S. Marine Corps
- Conflicts: World War II: Battle of Luzon; Battle of Iwo Jima
- Stats at Pro Football Reference
- Pro Football Hall of Fame

Arthur James "Fatso" Donovan Jr. (June 5, 1924 – August 4, 2013), was an American professional football player who was a defensive tackle for three National Football League (NFL) teams, primarily the Baltimore Colts. He played college football for the Boston College Eagles. He was inducted into the Pro Football Hall of Fame in 1968.

== Early life ==
Art Donovan, born June 5, 1924, was the son of Arthur Donovan Sr., a boxing referee, and the grandson of Professor Mike Donovan, the world middleweight boxing champion in the 1870s.

Art attended Mount Saint Michael Academy in the Bronx.

Donovan received a scholarship to the University of Notre Dame in 1942 but owing to the outbreak of war he left after one semester to join the United States Marine Corps, enlisting in April 1943. He remained under colors for four years, serving in the Pacific Theatre during World War II. He took part in some of the conflict's fiercest engagements, such as the Battle of Luzon and the Battle of Iwo Jima. He also served as an ammo-loader on a 40mm gun on the aircraft carrier USS San Jacinto and as a member of 3rd Marine Division.

His earned citations, which included the Asiatic-Pacific Campaign Medal and the Philippine Liberation Medal, and would later earn him a place in the U.S. Marine Corps Sports Hall of Fame, the first pro football player so honored. After the war, he completed his college career at Boston College.

== Professional career ==
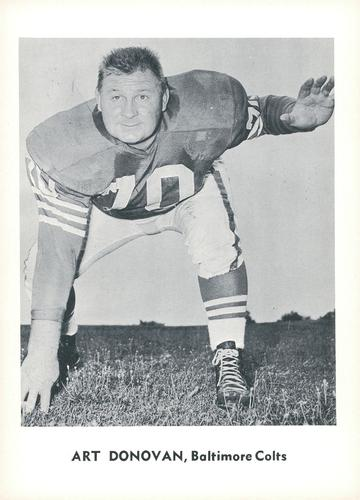
Donovan in an official team photo.

In each of his first three seasons, Donovan played for a team that went out of business. He started out with the first Baltimore Colts, which folded after his rookie season in 1950. Players formerly on the Colts roster were dispersed throughout the league via the 1951 NFL draft, with Donovan redrafted by the Cleveland Browns with the last pick of the fourth round in January.

At the end of August, the Browns still held 40 players on their roster. Donovan, together with teammate Sisto Averno, were sent by the world champs to the weak sister of the league, the New York Yanks, apparently without receiving significant compensation.

Donovan would spend the 1951 with the Yanks, and their successor, the Dallas Texans, in 1952.

After the Texans franchise folded, many of their players moved to Baltimore when the Colts were awarded a new franchise in 1953 and became the second Baltimore Colts, Donovan played with that team. He became one of the stars in an outstanding defense and was selected to five straight Pro Bowls, from 1953 through 1957. The Colts won back-to-back championships in 1958 and 1959. He was selected to the Pro Football Hall of Fame in 1968. He was runner up as best defensive tackle on the NFL 50th Anniversary All-Time Team.

During his career, Donovan played in what many believe was one of the most important games in NFL history, the 1958 NFL Championship Game between the Colts and the New York Giants. The contest between the two teams took place on December 28, 1958, and ended in a 17–17 tie. Being the championship game, it went into overtime, the first NFL game to do so. Witnessed by 40 million viewers on nationwide television, the game came to be known as the "greatest game ever played." Donovan made an important tackle during the overtime, stopping the Giants and allowing Johnny Unitas to lead the Colts on an 80-yard scoring drive to win the game. Donovan was one of 12 Hall of Fame players to take part, six of whom were Colts.

== Post-playing career ==
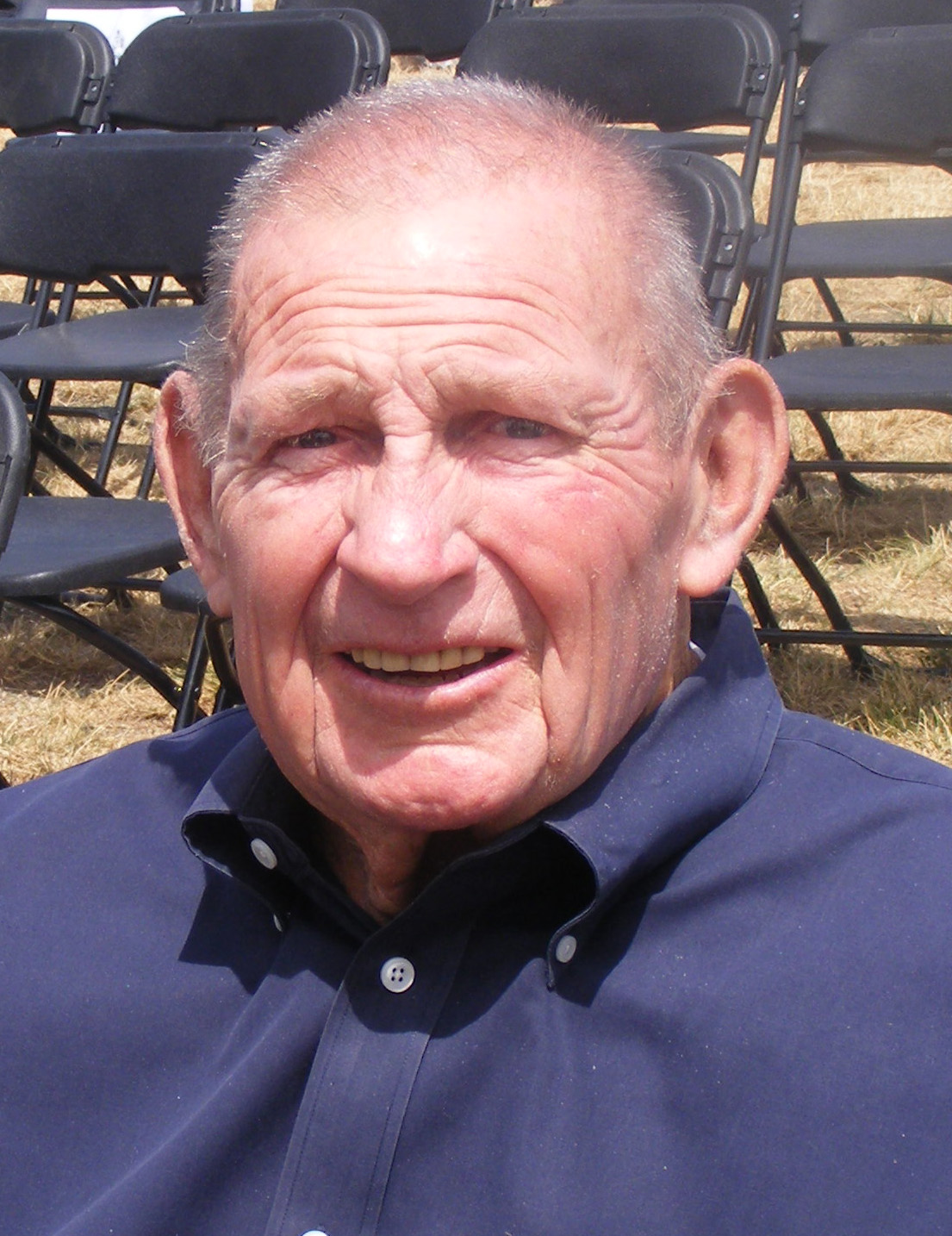
Donovan in 2010

In 1955, Donovan and his wife Dorothy purchased an 1850s Victorian mansion in Towson, Maryland, and converted it into the Valley Country Club, renowned for its sports bar. Although he was the owner, Donovan was known for doing manual labor at the club to include painting and working in the kitchen washing pots and pans. The couple operated it until their respective deaths (Dororthy in 2017); it still remains under family ownership and management. During the last ten years of his playing career, Donovan worked as a salesman for the Schenley Distilling Company. After he retired from football in the early 1960s, a friend and customer offered to sell him a liquor store on nothing but a handshake. Donovan owned and operated the business for about 22 years, alongside his management of the Club.

He published an autobiography, Fatso, in 1987. He was noted as a jovial and humorous person during his playing career and capitalized on that with television and speaking appearances after retiring as a player. Donovan also appeared ten times on Late Night with David Letterman, telling humorous stories about his old playing days and about other footballers he played with and against in his time. He relayed a story that he played without a helmet and in fact is shown on football cards without a helmet. Letterman wore Donovan's No. 70 Colts jersey in the famous Super Bowl XLI commercial with Oprah Winfrey and Jay Leno. Donovan also made several appearances on The Tonight Show Starring Johnny Carson.

Donovan guest-starred in the Nickelodeon show The Adventures of Pete & Pete in the episode "Space, Geeks, and Johnny Unitas". He also appeared as a guest commentator at the WWF King of the Ring tournament in 1994. alongside Gorilla Monsoon and Randy Savage. Donovan's appearance at the event became infamous among wrestling fans for him being legitimately uninformed about even the basics of the sport.

He was co-host of the popular 1990s program Braase, Donovan, Davis and Fans on WJZ-TV in Baltimore with Colt teammate Ordell Braase. The trio talked more about Art Donovan's fabled stories than contemporary NFL football, but the show held high ratings in its time slot. He was also a pitchman for the Maryland State Lottery and ESPN.

In the 1996 Homicide: Life on the Street episode 'Hostage, Part 1," Donovan appeared as the neighbor of a murder victim.

He has been interviewed in NPR's Weekend Edition Saturday.

== Achievements ==
- Played 12 seasons, 138 games
- Five-time consecutive Pro Bowl selection (1953–1957)
- Four-time consecutive first-team All-Pro (1954–1957)
- Runner up at tackle on NFL 50th Anniversary All Time Team
- First Colt to enter Pro Football Hall of Fame (1968)
- Member of 1958, 1959 NFL champion Baltimore Colts
- Began NFL play with Baltimore as a 26-year-old rookie (1950)
- Co-hosted the WWF's 1994 King of the Ring pay-per-view event
- U.S. Marine Corps Sports Hall of Fame (2004)

== Personal ==
Donovan was married to the former Dorothy Schaech for 57 years.

== Death and legacy ==
Donovan died August 4, 2013, at Stella Maris Hospice in Baltimore from a respiratory disease at age 89. A funeral mass was held at the Cathedral of Mary our Queen in Baltimore, and he was buried in a private ceremony at Dulaney Valley Memorial Gardens. The Washington Post said of Donovan:

"With the death of Art Donovan this past week, sports lost one of its last genuine characters, in every sense of the word. A lot of guys try to get our attention. Donovan was that rare guy who didn't have to try. He was as good on the field – he was elected to the Pro Football Hall of Fame in his second try - as he was off it. He appeared on Late Night with David Letterman and The Tonight Show Starring Johnny Carson and reduced both hosts and their audiences to howling in seconds. He was a player and a great storyteller and we'll never see another guy like him. That's sad for us, but it's a darn good epitaph."

— Tracee Hamilton, The Washington Post (August 11, 2013)
