= 1958 New York Giants season =

NFL team season

- Owner: Tim Mara
- Head coach: Jim Lee Howell
- Home stadium: Yankee Stadium

Results
- Record: 9–3
- Division place: 1st NFL Eastern
- Playoffs: Won Eastern Conference Playoff (vs. Browns) 10–0; Lost NFL Championship (vs. Colts) 17–23 (OT)

The 1958 New York Giants season was the franchise's 34th season in the National Football League. Jim Lee Howell was in his fifth year as head coach of the Giants. The Giants had two future Hall of Fame head coaches as assistant coaches: offensive coordinator Vince Lombardi and defensive coordinator Tom Landry. Lombardi left after the season to lead the Green Bay Packers, while Landry stayed for the 1959 season, then departed for the expansion Dallas Cowboys.

== Transactions ==
- The Giants obtained Lindon Crow and Pat Summerall from the Chicago Cardinals in exchange for Dick Nolan, Bobby Joe Conrad, and the Giants' first round pick.
- The Giants acquired Carl Karilivacz from the Detroit Lions
- Al Barry was an Offensive Guard obtained from the Green Bay Packers
- Walt Yowarsky was sent to the San Francisco 49ers

== Offseason ==
In the offseason, offensive coordinator Vince Lombardi was offered the position as head coach of the Philadelphia Eagles but he declined, choosing the stay with the Giants instead.

== Regular season ==
=== Schedule ===
Game	Date	Opponent	Result	Record	Venue	Attendance	Recap	Sources
1	September 28	at **Chicago Cardinals**	**W** 37–7	1–0	Civic Stadium	21,923	Recap	
2	October 5	at **Philadelphia Eagles**	**L** 24–27	1–1	Franklin Field	23,178	Recap	
3	October 12	at **Washington Redskins**	**W** 21–14	2–1	Griffith Stadium	30,348	Recap	
4	October 19	**Chicago Cardinals**	**L** 6–23	2–2	Yankee Stadium	52,684	Recap	
5	October 26	**Pittsburgh Steelers**	**W** 17–6	3–2	Yankee Stadium	25,007	Recap	
6	November 2	at **Cleveland Browns**	**W** 21–17	4–2	Cleveland Municipal Stadium	78,404	Recap	
7	November 9	Baltimore Colts	**W** 24–21	5–2	Yankee Stadium	71,164	Recap	
8	November 16	at **Pittsburgh Steelers**	**L** 10–31	5–3	Pitt Stadium	30,030	Recap	
9	November 23	**Washington Redskins**	**W** 30–0	6–3	Yankee Stadium	46,752	Recap	
10	November 30	**Philadelphia Eagles**	**W** 24–10	7–3	Yankee Stadium	35,438	Recap	
11	December 7	at Detroit Lions	**W** 19–17	8–3	Briggs Stadium	50,115	Recap	
12	December 14	**Cleveland Browns**	**W** 13–10	9–3	Yankee Stadium	63,192	Recap	
Note: Intra-conference opponents are in **bold** text.

== Game summaries ==
=== Week 1: at Chicago Cardinals ===
Week One: New York Giants at Chicago Cardinals

Quarter	1	2	3	4	Total
Giants	14	13	7	3	37
Cardinals	0	7	0	0	7

at War Memorial Stadium (Buffalo), Buffalo, New York

- Date: September 28
- Game attendance: 21,923

Game information

First quarter

- NYG Frank Gifford 8-yard run (Pat Summerall kick)
- NYG Gifford 8-yard run (Summerall kick)

Second quarter

- NYG Gifford 3-yard run (Summerall kick)
- NYG Alex Webster 7-yard run (kick failed)
- CHC John David Crow 2-yard fumble return (Bobby Joe Conrad kick)

Third quarter

- NYG Webster 1-yard run (Summerall kick)

Fourth quarter

- NYG Summerall 28-yard FG

=== Week 2: at Philadelphia Eagles ===
Week Two: New York Giants at Philadelphia Eagles

Quarter	1	2	3	4	Total
Giants	7	10	7	0	24
Eagles	10	7	3	7	27

at Franklin Field, Philadelphia

- Date: October 5
- Game attendance: 23,178

Game information

First quarter

- PHI Clarence Peaks 13-yard pass from Norm Van Brocklin (Bobby Walston kick)
- NYG Gifford 39-yard pass from Charlie Conerly (Summerall kick)
- PHI Walston 18-yard FG

Second quarter

- NYG Summerall 29-yard FG
- PHI Tommy McDonald 91-yard pass from Van Brocklin (Walston kick)
- NYG Phil King 2-yard run (Summerall kick)

Third quarter

- NYG Kyle Rote 15-yard pass from Conerly (Summerall kick)
- PHI Walston 18-yard FG

Fourth quarter

- PHI Billy Ray Barnes 1-yard run (Walston kick)

=== Week 3: at Washington Redskins ===
Week Three: New York Giants at Washington Redskins

Quarter	1	2	3	4	Total
Giants	14	0	0	7	21
Redskins	0	14	0	0	14

at Griffith Stadium, Washington, D.C.

- Date: October 12
- Game attendance: 30,348

Game information

First quarter

- NYG Gifford 6-yard run (Summerall kick)
- NYG Bob Schnelker 41-yard pass from Don Heinrich (Summerall kick)

Second quarter

- WAS Jim Podoley 29-yard pass from Eddie LeBaron (Sam Baker kick)
- WAS Ed Sutton 1-yard run (Baker kick)

Fourth quarter

- NYG Ken MacAfee 10-yard pass from Conerly (Summerall kick)

=== Week 4: vs. Chicago Cardinals ===
Week Four: Chicago Cardinals at New York Giants

Quarter	1	2	3	4	Total
Cardinals	0	6	0	17	23
Giants	0	0	6	0	6

at Yankee Stadium, Bronx, New York

- Date: October 19
- Game attendance: 52,684

Game information

Second quarter

- CHC Gern Nagler 4-yard pass from Lamar McHan (kick failed)

Third quarter

- NYG Mel Triplett 1-yard run (kick failed)

Fourth quarter

- CHC Nagler 11-yard pass from McHan (Conrad kick)
- CHC Ollie Matson 3-yard run (Conrad kick)
- CHC Conrad 38-yard FG

=== Week 5: vs. Pittsburgh Steelers ===
Week Five: Pittsburgh Steelers at New York Giants

Quarter	1	2	3	4	Total
Steelers	0	3	3	0	6
Giants	7	3	0	7	17

at Yankee Stadium, Bronx, New York

- Date: October 26
- Game attendance: 25,007

Game information

First quarter

- NYG Carl Karilivacz 23-yard fumble return (Summerall kick)

Second quarter

- PIT Tom Miner 27-yard FG
- NYG Summerall 34-yard FG

Third quarter

- PIT Miner 39-yard FG

Fourth quarter

- NYG Heinrich 1-yard run (Summerall kick)

=== Week 6: at Cleveland Browns ===
Week Six: New York Giants at Cleveland Browns

Quarter	1	2	3	4	Total
Giants	0	7	7	7	21
Browns	3	14	0	0	17

at Cleveland Stadium, Cleveland, Ohio

- Date: November 2
- Game attendance: 78,404

Game information

First quarter

- CLE Lou Groza 41-yard FG

Second quarter

- NYG Bob Schnelker 39-yard pass from Conerly (Summerall kick)
- CLE Jim Brown 58-yard run (Groza kick)
- CLE Ken Konz 46-yard interception return (Groza kick)

Third quarter

- NYG Webster 15-yard pass from Conerly (Summerall kick)

Fourth quarter

- NYG Webster 10-yard pass from Conerly (Summerall kick)

=== Week 7: vs. Baltimore Colts ===
Week Seven: Baltimore Colts at New York Giants

Quarter	1	2	3	4	Total
Colts	7	7	0	7	21
Giants	7	0	14	3	24

at Yankee Stadium, Bronx, New York

- Date: November 9
- Game attendance: 71,164

Game information

First quarter

- NYG Webster 5-yard run (Summerall kick)
- BAL Lenny Moore 36-yard pass from George Shaw (Steve Myhra kick)

Second quarter

- BAL Raymond Berry 23-yard pass from Shaw (Myhra kick)

Third quarter

- NYG Rote 25-yard pass from Conerly (Summerall kick)
- NYG Gifford 13-yard run (Summerall kick)

Fourth quarter

- BAL Moore 4-yard pass from Shaw (Myhra kick)
- NYG Summerall 28-yard FG

=== Week 8: at Pittsburgh Steelers ===
Week Eight: New York Giants at Pittsburgh Steelers

Quarter	1	2	3	4	Total
Giants	7	3	0	0	10
Steelers	0	7	14	10	31

at Forbes Field, Pittsburgh, Pennsylvania

- Date: November 16
- Game attendance: 30,030

Game information

First quarter

- NYG Gifford 1-yard run (Summerall kick)

Second quarter

- NYG Summerall 42-yard FG
- PIT Bobby Layne 1-yard run (Miner kick)

Third quarter

- PIT Tom Tracy 9-yard pass from Layne (Miner kick)
- PIT Gary Glick 37-yard fumble return (Miner kick)

Fourth quarter

- PIT Miner 43-yard FG
- PIT Layne 1-yard run (Miner kick)

=== Week 9: vs. Washington Redskins ===
Week Nine: Washington Redskins at New York Giants

Quarter	1	2	3	4	Total
Redskins	0	0	0	0	0
Giants	6	10	7	7	30

at Yankee Stadium, Bronx, New York

- Date: November 23
- Game attendance: 46,752

Game information

First quarter

- NYG Summerall 41-yard FG
- NYG Summerall 37-yard FG

Second quarter

- NYG Summerall 20-yard FG
- NYG MacAfee 10-yard pass from Conerly (Summerall kick)

Third quarter

- NYG Gifford 13-yard pass from Conerly (Summerall kick)

Fourth quarter

- NYG Schnelker 4-yard pass from Heinrich (Summerall kick)

=== Week 10: vs. Philadelphia Eagles ===
Week Ten: Philadelphia Eagles at New York Giants

Quarter	1	2	3	4	Total
Eagles	7	3	0	0	10
Giants	3	14	0	7	24

at Yankee Stadium, Bronx, New York

- Date: November 30
- Game attendance: 35,438

Game information

First quarter

- NYG Summerall 37-yard FG
- PHI Walston 14-yard pass from Van Brocklin (Walston kick)

Second quarter

- NYG Gifford 6-yard run (Summerall kick)
- NYG Schnelker 15-yard pass from Heinrich (Summerall kick)
- PHI Walston 33-yard FG

Fourth quarter

- NYG Rote 5-yard pass from Heinrich (Summerall kick)

=== Week 11: at Detroit Lions ===
Week Eleven: New York Giants at Detroit Lions

Quarter	1	2	3	4	Total
Giants	5	7	0	7	19
Lions	0	3	14	0	17

at Briggs Stadium, Detroit

- Date: December 7
- Game attendance: 50,115

Game information

First quarter

- NYG Jim Katcavage tackled Gene Gedman in end zone for a Safety
- NYG Summerall 18-yard FG

Second quarter

- NYG Webster 6-yard pass from Conerly (Summerall kick)
- DET Jim Martin 39-yard FG

Third quarter

- DET Ken Webb 2-yard pass from Tobin Rote (Martin kick)
- DET Wayne Walker 34-yard fumble return

Fourth quarter

- NYG Gifford 1-yard run (Summerall kick)

=== Week 12: vs. Cleveland Browns ===
Week Twelve: Cleveland Browns at New York Giants

Quarter	1	2	3	4	Total
Browns	7	3	0	0	10
Giants	0	3	0	10	13

at Yankee Stadium, Bronx, New York

- Date: December 14
- Game attendance: 63,192

Game information

First quarter

- CLE Brown 65-yard run (Groza kick)

Second quarter

- NYG Summerall 46-yard FG
- CLE Groza 22-yard FG

Fourth quarter

- NYG Schnelker 8-yard pass from Gifford (Summerall kick)
- NYG Summerall 49-yard FG

== Playoffs ==
Round	Date	Opponent	Result	Venue	Attendance	Recap	Sources
Eastern Conf. Playoff	December 21	Cleveland Browns	W 10–0	Yankee Stadium	61,174	Recap	
NFL Championship	December 28	Baltimore Colts	L 17–23(OT)	Yankee Stadium	64,185	Recap	

=== Eastern Conference Playoff ===
Eastern Conference Playoff: Cleveland Browns at New York Giants

Quarter	1	2	3	4	Total
Browns	0	0	0	0	0
Giants	7	3	0	0	10

at Yankee Stadium, Bronx, New York

- Date: December 21
- Game attendance: 61,174

Game information

First quarter

- NYG Conerly 10-yard run (Summerall kick)

Second quarter

- NYG Summerall 26-yard FG

Top passers

- CLE – Milt Plum – 7/12, 83 YDS, 0 TD, 2 INT
- NYG – Charlie Conerly – 7/11, 75 YDS, 0 TD, 0 INT

Top rushers

- CLE – Milt Plum – 3 CAR, 13 YDS; Jim Brown – 7 CAR, 8 YDS
- NYG – Frank Gifford – 23 CAR, 95 YDS

Top receivers

- CLE – Pete Brewster – 3 REC, 56 YDS
- NYG – Bob Schnelker – 2 REC, 46 YDS

=== NFL Championship Game ===
The 1958 National Football League Championship Game was played on December 28, 1958, at Yankee Stadium in New York City. The 1958 game was the 26th annual NFL championship game. The Colts beat the Giants 23–17 in overtime, earning their first ever championship. The game has come to be known as The Greatest Game Ever Played.

1958 NFL Championship Game: Baltimore Colts at New York Giants

Quarter	1	2	3	4	OT	Total
Colts	0	14	0	3	6	23
Giants	3	0	7	7	0	17

at Yankee Stadium, Bronx, New York

- Date: December 28
- Game attendance: 64,185

Game information

First quarter

- NYG Summerall 36-yard FG

Second quarter

- BAL Ameche 2-yard run (Myhra kick)
- BAL Berry 15-yard pass from Unitas (Myhra kick)

Third quarter

- NYG Triplett 1-yard run (Summerall kick)

Fourth quarter

- NYG Gifford 15-yard pass from Conerly (Summerall kick)
- BAL Myhra 20-yard FG

Overtime

- BAL Ameche 1-yard run

Top passers

- BAL – Johnny Unitas – 26/40, 349 YDS, TD, INT
- NYG – Charlie Conerly – 10/14, 187 YDS, TD, 0 INT

Top rushers

- BAL – Alan Ameche – 14 CAR, 65 YDS, 2 TD
- NYG – Frank Gifford – 12 CAR, 60 YDS

Top receivers

- BAL – Raymond Berry – 12 REC, 178 YDS, TD
- NYG – Kyle Rote – 2 REC, 76 YDS

== Standings ==
NFL Eastern Conference
	W	L	T	PCT	CONF	PF	PA	STK
New York Giants	9	3	0	.750	7–3	246	183	W4
Cleveland Browns	9	3	0	.750	8–2	302	217	L1
Pittsburgh Steelers	7	4	1	.636	6–3–1	261	230	W1
Washington Redskins	4	7	1	.364	3–6–1	214	268	W1
Chicago Cardinals	2	9	1	.182	2–7–1	261	356	L6
Philadelphia Eagles	2	9	1	.182	2–7–1	235	306	L4

Note: Tie games were not officially counted in the standings until 1972.

NFL Western Conference
	W	L	T	PCT	CONF	PF	PA	STK
Baltimore Colts	9	3	0	.750	8–2	381	203	L2
Los Angeles Rams	8	4	0	.667	7–3	344	278	W3
Chicago Bears	8	4	0	.667	7–3	298	230	W2
San Francisco 49ers	6	6	0	.500	4–6	257	324	W2
Detroit Lions	4	7	1	.364	3–6–1	261	276	L2
Green Bay Packers	1	10	1	.091	0–9–1	193	382	L7

Note: Tie games were not officially counted in the standings until 1972.

== Roster ==
1958 New York Giants roster
Quarterbacks (QB): 42 Charlie Conerly; 11 Don Heinrich; 17 Jack Kemp; Running backs (RB): 16 Frank Gifford; 24 Phil King; 22 Billy Lott; 13 Don Maynard; 33 Mel Triplett; 29 Alex Webster; Wide receivers (WR): 80 Ken MacAfee; 44 Kyle Rote; 85 Bob Schnelker; Tight ends (TE)	Offensive linemen (OL): 68 Al Barry G; 79 Rosey Brown T; 60 Buzz Guy G/T; 62 Bob Mischak G; 66 Jack Stroud G/T; 55 Ray Wietecha C; 72 Frank Youso T; Defensive linemen (DL): 71 M. L. Brackett DE/DT/C; 76 Rosey Grier DT; 75 Jim Katcavage DE/DT; 77 Dick Modzelewski DT; 81 Andy Robustelli DE	Linebackers (LB): 70 Sam Huff MLB; 89 Cliff Livingston OLB/DE; 84 Harland Svare OLB; 30 Bill Svoboda OLB; Defensive backs (DB): 41 Lindon Crow CB/S; 48 Ed Hughes CB; 21 Carl Karilivacz CB; 20 Jimmy Patton S; 45 Emlen Tunnell S; Special teams (ST): 34 Don Chandler P; 88 Pat Summerall K	Reserve: 83 Jon Jelacic DE (Military); Rookies in italics

== See also ==
- List of New York Giants seasons
