= 1958 Philadelphia Eagles season =

NFL team season

- Owner: Happy Hundred
- Head coach: Buck Shaw

Results
- Record: 2–9–1
- Division place: 5th (tied) NFL Eastern
- Playoffs: Did not qualify

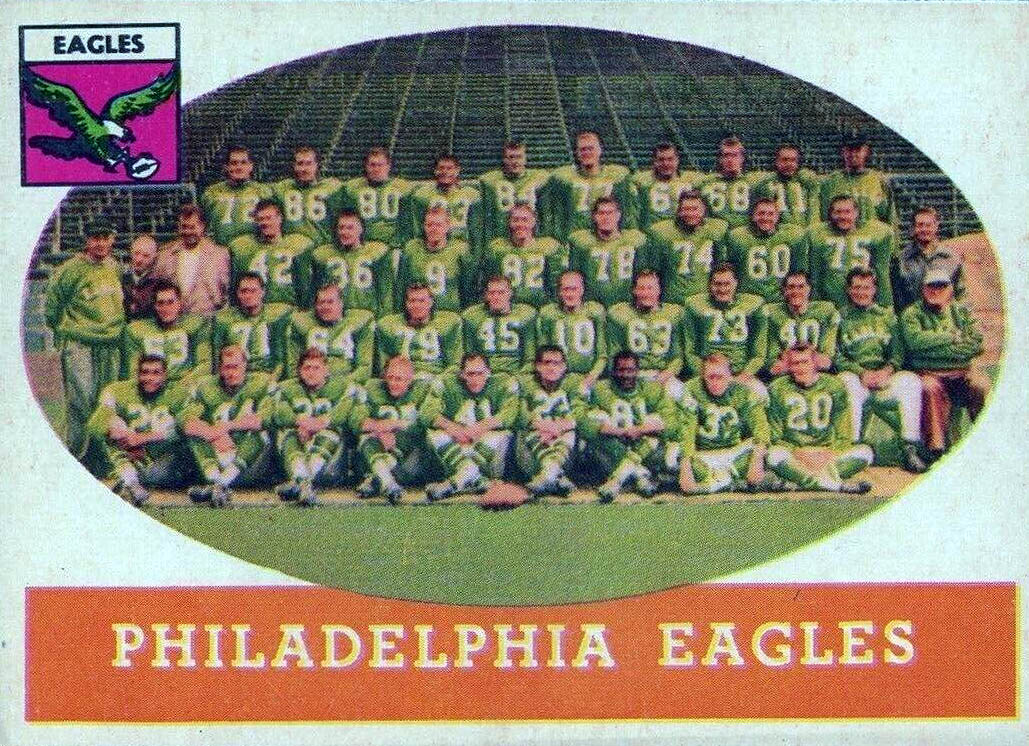
The Eagles team of 1958

The 1958 Philadelphia Eagles season was the franchise's 26th season in the National Football League (NFL). They failed to improve on their previous output of 4–8, winning only two games. The team failed to qualify for the playoffs for the ninth consecutive season. In the offseason, Vince Lombardi was offered the Eagles head coaching position but he refused it. He opted to stay as the Offensive Coordinator of the New York Giants.

== Off-season ==
The Eagles hired the Air Force Academy's 1st head coach Buck Shaw. Shaw took over a last-place Eagles team and started rebuilding. He was also the 1st coach of the San Francisco 49ers when they formed in the AAFC in 1946. He immediately dealt Buck Lansford, Jimmy Harris, and a first-round draft choice to the Los Angeles Rams for 32-year-old, nine-year veteran quarterback Norm Van Brocklin.

=== NFL draft ===
The 1958 NFL draft was held on December 2, 1957 (rounds 1–4) and January 28, 1958 (rounds 5–30). The draft was 30 rounds long with 12 teams making picks. A total of 360 players were selected.

With a 4–8 record in 1957 the Eagles made the 6th pick in the 1st round.

This was the last year in which the Lottery Bonus Pick was used. The Chicago Cardinals had the number 1 pick of the draft and the Bonus Pick. They used the picks to select as Lottery Bonus Pick King Hill a Quarterback out of Rice University. With the 2nd pick they chose 1957 Heisman Trophy winner John David Crow a Halfback out of Texas A&M University

=== Player selections ===
The table shows the Eagles selections and what picks they had that were traded away and the team that ended up with that pick. It is possible the Eagles' pick ended up with this team via another team that the Eagles made a trade with. Not shown are acquired picks that the Eagles traded away.

= Pro Bowler	= Hall of Famer

Rd	Pick #	Player	Position	College	Rd	Pick #	Player	Position	College
1	6	Walt Kowalczyk	Fullback	Michigan State	2	17	Proverb Jacobs	Tackle	California
3	31	_{Pick Taken by Washington Redskins}			4	43	Frank Rigney	Tackle	Iowa
5	52	Bobby Mulgado	Back	Arizona State	6	64	John Kersey	Tackle	Duke
7	76	Len Mansfield	Tackle	Pittsburg State	8	88	Bill Striegel	Linebacker	Pacific
9	100	_{Pick Taken by Pittsburgh Steelers}			10	112	Theron Sapp	Back	Georgia
11	124	Mel Dillard	Back	Purdue	12	136	Jack Crabtree	Back	Oregon
13	148	Mickey Trimarki	Quarterback	West Virginia	14	160	Bill Lapham	Center	Iowa
15	172	Stan Hinos	Tackle	Mississippi Valley State	16	184	Mike Meatheringham	Tackle	Georgia
17	196	Bill Van Buren	Center	Iowa	18	208	John Burroughs	Tackle	Iowa
19	220	Ron Sabal	Guard	Purdue	20	232	Kent Lovelace	Back	Mississippi
21	244	John Madden	Offensive tackle	Cal Poly San Luis Obispo	22	256	George Sherwood	End	St. Joseph's (IN)
23	268	Billy Templeton	End	Mississippi	24	280	Jim Padget	Center	Clemson
25	292	Hal Divine	Tackle	Memphis State	26	304	Neil MacLean	Back	Wake Forest
27	316	Hindman Wall	End	Auburn	28	328	Gene Gossage	Tackle	Northwestern
29	340	Don McDonald	Back	Houston	30	351	Jim Thompson	End	Temple

== Preseason ==
Week	Date	Opponent	Result	Record	Venue	Attendance
1	August 16	Baltimore Colts	W 30–28	1–0	Hershey Stadium	16,894
2	August 24	vs. Chicago Bears	L 0–3	1–1	Ohio State Fairgrounds Stadium	15,365
3	September 1	at Green Bay Packers	L 17–20	1–2	City Stadium	17,857
4	September 6	vs. Washington Redskins	L 31–35	1–3	Gator Bowl	26,242
5	September 13	vs. Detroit Lions	W 31–24	2–3	Oklahoma Memorial Stadium	61,000
6	September 21	at San Francisco 49ers	W 31–28	3–3	Kezar Stadium	33,398

== Schedule ==
Week	Date	Opponent	Result	Record	Venue	Attendance
1	September 28	**Washington Redskins**	**L** 14–24	0–1	Franklin Field	36,850
2	October 5	**New York Giants**	**W** 27–24	1–1	Franklin Field	23,178
3	October 12	at **Pittsburgh Steelers**	**L** 3–24	1–2	Pitt Stadium	23,153
4	October 19	San Francisco 49ers	**L** 24–30	1–3	Franklin Field	33,110
5	October 26	at Green Bay Packers	**L** 35–38	1–4	City Stadium	31,043
6	November 2	at **Chicago Cardinals**	**T** 21–21	1–4–1	Comiskey Park	17,486
7	November 9	**Pittsburgh Steelers**	**L** 24–31	1–5–1	Franklin Field	26,306
8	November 16	**Chicago Cardinals**	**W** 49–21	2–5–1	Franklin Field	18,315
9	November 23	at **Cleveland Browns**	**L** 14–28	2–6–1	Cleveland Municipal Stadium	51,319
10	November 30	at **New York Giants**	**L** 10–24	2–7–1	Yankee Stadium	35,438
11	December 7	**Cleveland Browns**	**L** 14–21	2–8–1	Franklin Field	36,773
12	December 14	at **Washington Redskins**	**L** 0–20	2–9–1	Griffith Stadium	22,621
Note: Intra-conference opponents are in **bold** text.

=== Standings ===
NFL Eastern Conference
	W	L	T	PCT	CONF	PF	PA	STK
New York Giants	9	3	0	.750	7–3	246	183	W4
Cleveland Browns	9	3	0	.750	8–2	302	217	L1
Pittsburgh Steelers	7	4	1	.636	6–3–1	261	230	W1
Washington Redskins	4	7	1	.364	3–6–1	214	268	W1
Chicago Cardinals	2	9	1	.182	2–7–1	261	356	L6
Philadelphia Eagles	2	9	1	.182	2–7–1	235	306	L4

Note: Tie games were not officially counted in the standings until 1972.

== Roster ==
(All time List of Philadelphia Eagles players in franchise history)

= 1958 Pro Bowl Selection	= Hall of Famer

- + After name means 1st team selection

NO.	Player	AGE	POS	GP	GS	WT	HT	YRS	College
	Buck Shaw	61	COACH	_{1958 record} 2–9–1	_{Eagles; Lifetime} 2–9–1	_{NFL; Lifetime} 73–48–5		1	Notre Dame
33	Billy Ray Barnes	23	HB	12	0	201	5–11	1	Wake Forest
60	Chuck Bednarik	33	LB-C	12	0	233	6–3	9	Pennsylvania Quakers
81	Eddie Bell	27	DB-LB	12	0	212	6–1	3	Pennsylvania Quakers
36	Dick Bielski	26	E-FB	12	0	224	6–1	3	Maryland Terrapins
65	Harold Bradley	29	G	12	12	230	6–2	4	Iowa Hawkeyes
40	Tom Brookshier	27	DB	11	0	196	6–0	5	Colorado Buffalos
78	Marion Campbell	29	DE-DT-MG-G-T	11	0	250	6–3	4	Georgia Bulldogs
86	Ed Cooke	23	DE-LB	7	0	250	6–4	Rookie	Maryland Terrapins
42	Bob Hudson	28	DB-LB-E	11	0	225	6–4	7	Clemson Tigers
63	Ken Huxhold	29	G	12	0	226	6–1	4	Wisconsin Badgers
67	Proverb Jacobs	23	T-DT	12	0	258	6–4	Rookie	California Golden Bears
9	Sonny Jurgensen	24	QB	12	0	202	5–11	1	Duke Blue Devils
73	Ed Khayat	23	DT-DE-T	5	0	240	6–3	1	Tulane Green Wave
68	Bill Koman	24	LB	12	12	229	6–2	2	North Carolina Tarheels
43	Walt Kowalczyk	23	FB-DB	12	0	208	6–0	Rookies	Michigan State Spartans
64	Galen Laack	26	G	8	0	230	6–0	Rookie	Pacific Tigers
61	Tom Louderback	25	LB-C-G	12	0	235	6–2	Rookie	San Jose State Spartans
25	Tommy McDonald	24	FL-HB-SE-WR	10	0	178	5–9	1	Oklahoma Sooners
66	Ed Meadows	26	DE-E	12	0	221	6–2	4	Duke Blue Devils
80	Gene Mitcham	26	E	2	0	206	6–2	Rookie	Arizona State Sun Devils
46	Brad Myers	29	B-E	9	0	197	6–1	5	Bucknell Bison
87	Andy Nacrelli	25	E	2	0	190	6–1	Rookie	Fordham Rams
41	Jerry Norton	27	DB-HB	9	0	195	5–11	4	SMU Mustangs
70	Don Owens	26	DT-T	12	0	255	6–5	1	Southern Miss Golden Eagles
26	Clarence Peaks	23	FB	11	0	218	6–1	1	Michigan State Spartans
53	Bob Pellegrini	24	LB-G	12	0	233	6–2	2	Maryland Terrapins
76	Volney Peters	30	DT-T-DE	10	0	237	6–4	6	USC Trojans
44	Pete Retzlaff	27	E-HB-TE	12	0	211	6–1	2	South Dakota St. Jackrabbits
72	Jess Richardson	28	DT	12	0	261	6–2	5	Alabama Crimson Tide
22	Lee Riley	26	DB	12	0	192	6–1	3	Univ. of Detroit Mercy Titans
45	Rocky Ryan	26	DB-E	3	0	202	6–1	2	Illinois
82	Tom Scott	28	DE-LB	12	0	218	6–2	5	Virginia
64	John Simerson	23	C-T	4	0	257	6–3	1	Purdue Boilermakers
79	Lum Snyder	28	T	12	0	228	6–5	6	Georgia Tech Yellow Jackets
74	Len Szafaryn	30	T-G-LB-DT	7	0	226	6–2	9	North Carolina Tarheels
11	Norm Van Brocklin	32	QB	12	12	190	6–1	9	Oregon Ducks
83	Bobby Walston	30	E-HB-K	12	0	190	6–0	7	Georgia Bulldogs
27	Billy Wells	27	HB	12	0	180	5–9	4	Michigan State Spartans
73	Sid Youngelman	27	DT-DE	5	0	257	6–3	3	Alabama Crimson Tide
	35 Players; Team Average	26.5		12		220.3	6–1.5	3.2	
