= Leo Sanford =

American football player (1929–2024)

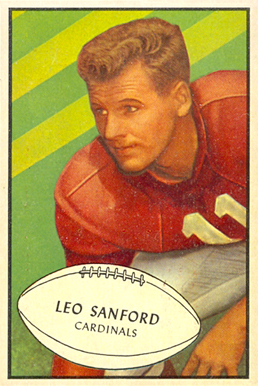
- Sanford on a 1953 Bowman football card

No. 73, 51, 55
- Position: Linebacker

Personal information
- Born: October 4, 1929; Dallas, Texas, U.S.
- Died: March 22, 2024 (aged 94)
- Listed height: 6 ft 1 in (1.85 m)
- Listed weight: 224 lb (102 kg)

Career information
- High school: Fair Park (Shreveport, Louisiana)
- College: Louisiana Tech
- NFL draft: 1951: 8th round, 90th overall pick

Career history
- Chicago Cardinals (1951–1957); Baltimore Colts (1958)

Awards and highlights
- NFL champion (1958); 2× Pro Bowl (1956-1957); Louisiana Tech Athletic Hall of Fame (1985); Louisiana Sports Hall of Fame (1991)

Career NFL statistics
- Interceptions: 17
- Fumble recoveries: 11
- Total touchdowns: 2
- Stats at Pro Football Reference

Leo Sanford (October 4, 1929 – March 22, 2024) was an American professional football player who was a linebacker for the Chicago Cardinals and Baltimore Colts of the National Football League (NFL). He played college football for the Louisiana Tech Bulldogs. Sanford died on March 22, 2024, at the age of 94. He was part of the 1958 Baltimore Colts team that won the world championship in the first sudden-death overtime game in the history of professional football.
