= 1958 San Francisco 49ers season =

American football team season

- Owner: Victor Morabito
- General manager: Louis Spadia
- Head coach: Frankie Albert
- Home stadium: Kezar Stadium

Results
- Record: 6–6
- Division place: 4th NFL Western
- Playoffs: Did not qualify

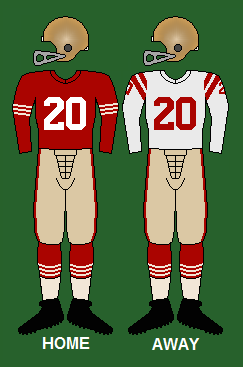
The uniform of the San Francisco 49ers

The 1958 San Francisco 49ers season was the team's 9th season in the NFL, their 12th season overall, and their third and final season with head coach Frankie Albert.

Coming off of an 8–4 record from the previous season, the 49ers lost 3 of their first 5 games, and finished with a 6–6 record. Each of the team's quarterbacks, Y. A. Tittle and John Brodie, started six of the twelve games and ended the season with similar statistics.

== Offseason ==
=== Draft ===
1958 San Francisco 49ers draft
Round	Pick	Player	Position	College	Notes
1	8	Jim Pace	HB	Michigan	
1	9	Charlie Krueger *	DT	Texas A&M	Made roster in 1959
2	22	Bob Newman	B	Washington State	
3	33	Bobby Hoppe	B	Auburn	
4	46	John Varone	B	Miami (FL)	Signed with Winnipeg Blue Bombers (CFL)
5	59	Billy Atkins *	DB	Auburn	
6	71	Henry Schmidt *	DT	USC	
8	87	Leon Burton	HB	Arizona State	
8	95	Ron Mills	B	West Texas State	
9	107	George Troutman	T	Capital	
10	119	Vel Heckman	T	Florida	
11	131	Hogan Wharton	G	Houston	
12	143	Pete Williams	T	Lehigh	
13	151	Jim Yore	B	Indiana	
13	155	Hal Dukes	E	Michigan State	
14	167	Max Fields	B	Whittier	
16	191	George Shirkey	DT	Stephen F. Austin	
17	203	John Wittenborn	G	Southeast Missouri State	
18	215	Dennit Morris *	LB	Oklahoma	
19	227	Ronnie Mushatt	C	Grambling State	
20	239	Jerry Mertens *	DB	Drake	
21	251	Don Christian	B	Arkansas	
22	263	Bruce Hartman	T	Luther	
23	275	Larry Fields	B	Utah	
24	287	Dee Mackey	E	East Texas State	Made roster in 1960
25	299	Bill Kaczmarek	C	Southwest Missouri State	
26	311	Hillard Hill	E	USC	
27	323	Bob Witucki	E	Texas Tech	
28	335	Garland Warren	C	North Texas State	Winnipeg Blue Bombers (CFL)
29	347	Herman Hodges	B	Sam Houston State	
30	358	Ted Stahura	T	Kansas State	
Made roster * Made at least one Pro Bowl during career

== Personnel ==
=== Staff / Coaches ===
1958 San Francisco 49ers staff
Front office: Team Owner - Victor Morabito; General manager – Louis Spadia; Head coaches: Head coach - Frankie Albert; Offensive coaches: Chief of Offense / Offensive Coordinator - Red Hickey; Offensive Line – Bill Johnson	Defensive coaches: Defensive Assistant – Phil Bengtson; Special teams coaches: None - N/A

=== Roster ===
1958 San Francisco 49ers roster
Quarterbacks: 12 John Brodie; 14 Y. A. Tittle; Running backs: 32 Gene Babb; 39 Hugh McElhenny; 43 Jim Pace; 34 Joe Perry; 24 J. D. Smith; Receivers: 88 Clyde Conner; 87 Fred Dugan; 85 Bill Jessup P; 27 R. C. Owens; 82 Gordy Soltau K; 84 Billy Wilson	Offensive linemen: 77 Bruce Bosley G; 64 Ted Connolly G; 76 John Gonzaga T/G; 68 Lou Palatella G; 79 Bob St. Clair T; 78 John Thomas T; 66 John Wittenborn G; 50 Walt Yowarsky C; Defensive linemen: 75 Ed Henke DE; 72 Bill Herchman DT; 74 Bob Toneff DE; 73 Leo Nomellini DT	Linebackers: 55 Matt Hazeltine OLB; 57 Dennit Morris OLB/MLB; 52 Karl Rubke MLB/C; 62 Jerry Tubbs OLB/C; Defensive backs: 29 Billy Atkins S/P; 80 Jerry Mertens CB; 47 Dicky Moegle S; 42 Jimmy Ridlon CB; 20 Bill Stits CB; 40 Abe Woodson S/RB	Reserve lists: -- Charlie Krueger DE/DT (IR); 53 Frank Morze C (IR); rookies in italics

== Preseason ==
Week	Date	Opponent	Result	Record	Venue
1	August 17	New York Giants	L 10–19	0–1	Kezar Stadium
2	August 23	vs. Washington Redskins	W 20–19	1–1	Multnomah Stadium
3	August 31	Chicago Cardinals	W 55–31	2–1	Kezar Stadium
4	September 7	Cleveland Browns	W 21–16	3–1	Kezar Stadium
5	September 12	at Los Angeles Rams	L 38–40	3–2	Los Angeles Memorial Coliseum
6	September 21	Philadelphia Eagles	L 28–31	3–3	Kezar Stadium

== Schedule ==
Week	Date	Opponent	Result	Record	Venue	Attendance	Recap	Sources
1	September 28	Pittsburgh Steelers	**W** 23–20	1–0	Kezar Stadium	51,856	Recap	
2	October 5	**Los Angeles Rams**	**L** 3–33	1–1	Kezar Stadium	59,826	Recap	
3	October 12	at **Chicago Bears**	**L** 6–28	1–2	Wrigley Field	45,310	Recap	
4	October 19	at Philadelphia Eagles	**W** 30–24	2–2	Franklin Field	33,110	Recap	
5	October 26	**Chicago Bears**	**L** 14–27	2–3	Kezar Stadium	59,441	Recap	
6	November 2	**Detroit Lions**	**W** 24–21	3–3	Kezar Stadium	59,350	Recap	
7	November 9	at **Los Angeles Rams**	**L** 7–56	3–4	Los Angeles Memorial Coliseum	95,082	Recap	
8	November 16	at **Detroit Lions**	**L** 21–35	3–5	Briggs Stadium	54,523	Recap	
9	November 23	at **Green Bay Packers**	**W** 33–12	4–5	Milwaukee County Stadium	43,819	Recap	
10	November 30	at **Baltimore Colts**	**L** 27–35	4–6	Memorial Stadium	57,557	Recap	
11	December 7	**Green Bay Packers**	**W** 48–21	5–6	Kezar Stadium	50,793	Recap	
12	December 14	**Baltimore Colts**	**W** 21–12	6–6	Kezar Stadium	58,334	Recap	
Note: Intra-conference opponents are in **bold** text.

=== Standings ===
NFL Western Conference
	W	L	T	PCT	CONF	PF	PA	STK
Baltimore Colts	9	3	0	.750	8–2	381	203	L2
Los Angeles Rams	8	4	0	.667	7–3	344	278	W3
Chicago Bears	8	4	0	.667	7–3	298	230	W2
San Francisco 49ers	6	6	0	.500	4–6	257	324	W2
Detroit Lions	4	7	1	.364	3–6–1	261	276	L2
Green Bay Packers	1	10	1	.091	0–9–1	193	382	L7

Note: Tie games were not officially counted in the standings until 1972.
