= 1958 Detroit Lions season =

NFL team season

- Head coach: George Wilson
- Home stadium: Briggs Stadium

Results
- Record: 4–7–1
- Division place: 5th NFL Western
- Playoffs: Did not qualify

The 1958 season was Detroit Lions' 29th in the National Football League (NFL), their 18th playing in Briggs Stadium, and their second under head coach George Wilson. The defending NFL champions failed to improve on their 8–4 record from the previous season and finished at 4–7–1, fifth in the six-team Western Conference.

Following the second game of the regular season in early October, the Lions made a major trade. Future hall of fame quarterback Bobby Layne, the Lions' primary starter for eight seasons and leader of three championship teams, was traded to the Pittsburgh Steelers for third-year quarterback Earl Morrall and two draft choices.

This supposedly led to Layne "cursing" the Lions, allegedly saying that Detroit "would not win for fifty years." The story is considered a hoax, as no contemporaneous account exists and Layne himself denied saying it. (Real or not, the "curse" bedeviled the Lions franchise for the next half-century, and beyond: as of 2024, 66 years after the trade, Detroit has not won another championship, and indeed has won only three playoff contests [two of them in 2023] in that time.) Meanwhile, after losing their first two games without Layne, the Steelers finished at 7–4–1, their best record in over a decade.

The Lions won only one game in the first half of the season (1–4–1), then spilt the final six games; one of the poorest performances by a defending league champion in NFL history. The preseason began on a sour note in mid-August as they lost 35–19 to the 14-point underdog College All-Stars at Soldier Field in Chicago, closing the margin with a late touchdown.

== Preseason ==
Week	Date	Opponent	Result	Record	Venue	Attendance
1	August 15	vs. College All-Stars	L 19–35	0–1	Soldier Field	70,000
2	August 22	Cleveland Browns	W 17–7	1–1	Briggs Stadium	36,662
3	August 29	New York Giants	W 26–7	2–1	Briggs Stadium	33,090
4	September 5	vs. Chicago Bears	L 17–24	2–2	Cotton Bowl	40,000
5	September 13	vs. Philadelphia Eagles	L 24–31	2–3	Oklahoma Memorial Stadium	61,000
6	September 20	at Cleveland Browns	L 7–41	2–4	Cleveland Municipal Stadium	35,543

== Regular season ==
According to the team, a total of 42,154 season tickets were sold by the Lions for the 1957 campaign. The Lions played their home games in Briggs Stadium (Tiger Stadium), which had a regular listed seating capacity of 46,194, with an additional 7,000 bleacher seats for football to bring total capacity to 53,194.

Game	Date	Opponent	Result	Record	Venue	Attendance	Recap	Sources
1	September 28	at **Baltimore Colts**	**L** 15–28	0–1	Memorial Stadium	48,377	Recap	
2	October 5	at **Green Bay Packers**	**T** 13–13	0–1–1	New City Stadium	32,035	Recap	
3	October 12	**Los Angeles Rams**	**L**28–42	0–2–1	Briggs Stadium	55,648	Recap	
4	October 19	**Baltimore Colts**	**L** 14–40	0–3–1	Briggs Stadium	55,190	Recap	
5	October 26	at **Los Angeles Rams**	**W** 41–24	1–3–1	L.A. Memorial Coliseum	81,703	Recap	
6	November 2	at **San Francisco 49ers**	**L** 21–24	1–4–1	Kezar Stadium	59,350	Recap	
7	November 9	at Cleveland Browns	**W** 30–10	2–4–1	Cleveland Municipal Stadium	75,563	Recap	
8	November 16	**San Francisco 49ers**	**W** 35–21	3–4–1	Briggs Stadium	54,523	Recap	
9	November 23	**Chicago Bears**	**L** 7–20	3–5–1	Briggs Stadium	55,280	Recap	
10	November 27	**Green Bay Packers**	**W** 24–14	4–5–1	Briggs Stadium	50,971	Recap	
11	December 7	vs. New York Giants	**L** 17–19	4–6–1	Briggs Stadium	50,115	Recap	
12	December 14	at **Chicago Bears**	**L** 16–21	4–7–1	Wrigley Field	38,346	Recap	
Note: Intra-conference opponents are in **bold** text. Thanksgiving: November 27.

== Game summaries ==
=== Week 10 ===
Team	1	2	3	4	Total
Packers	7	0	7	0	14
• Lions	10	0	7	7	24

- Date: November 27
- Location: Briggs Stadium, Detroit, Michigan
- Game attendance: 50,971

Scoring summary
1	GB	Max McGee 28 yard pass from Bart Star (Paul Hornung kick)	GB 7–0
1	DET	Ken Webb 1 yard run (Jim Martin kick)	Tie 7–7
1	DET	Jim Martin 32 yard field goal	DET 10–7
3	GB	Don McIlhenny 1 yard run (Paul Hornung kick)	GB 14–10
3	DET	Tobin Rote 1 yard run (Jim Martin kick)	DET 17–14
4	DET	Gene Gedman 4 yard run (Jim Martin kick)	DET 24–14

=== Standings ===
NFL Western Conference
	W	L	T	PCT	CONF	PF	PA	STK
Baltimore Colts	9	3	0	.750	8–2	381	203	L2
Los Angeles Rams	8	4	0	.667	7–3	344	278	W3
Chicago Bears	8	4	0	.667	7–3	298	230	W2
San Francisco 49ers	6	6	0	.500	4–6	257	324	W2
Detroit Lions	4	7	1	.364	3–6–1	261	276	L2
Green Bay Packers	1	10	1	.091	0–9–1	193	382	L7

Note: Tie games were not officially counted in the standings until 1972.

NFL Eastern Conference
	W	L	T	PCT	CONF	PF	PA	STK
New York Giants	9	3	0	.750	7–3	246	183	W4
Cleveland Browns	9	3	0	.750	8–2	302	217	L1
Pittsburgh Steelers	7	4	1	.636	6–3–1	261	230	W1
Washington Redskins	4	7	1	.364	3–6–1	214	268	W1
Chicago Cardinals	2	9	1	.182	2–7–1	261	356	L6
Philadelphia Eagles	2	9	1	.182	2–7–1	235	306	L4

Note: Tie games were not officially counted in the standings until 1972.

== Roster ==
Detroit Lions 1958 roster
Quarterbacks: 14 Earl Morrall; 18 Tobin Rote; Running backs: 40 Howard Cassady; 26 Gene Gedman; 35 John Henry Johnson; 45 Dan Lewis; 34 Ken Webb; Receivers: 80 Jim Gibbons; 84 Dave Middleton; 87 Perry Richards; 81 Tom Rychlec	Offensive linemen: 50 Charlie Ane C/T; 67 Stan Campbell G; 76 Lou Creekmur T; 64 Doug Hogland G; 73 Ken Russell T; 66 Harley Sewell G; Defensive linemen: 85 Gene Cronin DE/DT; 53 Bill Glass DT/C; 71 Alex Karras DT; 72 Gil Mains DT; 78 Darris McCord DE; 74 Bob Miller DT; 79 Gerry Perry DT/DE/K	Linebackers: 86 Bob Long OLB/DE; 47 Jim Martin MLB/K; 56 Joe Schmidt MLB; 55 Wayne Walker OLB; 57 Roger Zatkoff OLB; Defensive backs: 41 Terry Barr CB; 24 Jack Christiansen S; 25 James David CB; 28 Yale Lary S/P; 43 Gary Lowe S; 23 Dave Whitsell CB	Reserve lists: -- Hal Boutte WR (Military); 83 Jim Doran WR (IR); -- Steve Junker WR (IR); -- Jerry Reichow WR (IR); rookies in italics
