= 1958 NFL Championship Game =

Renowned American football event

Coordinates: 40.827°N 73.928°W

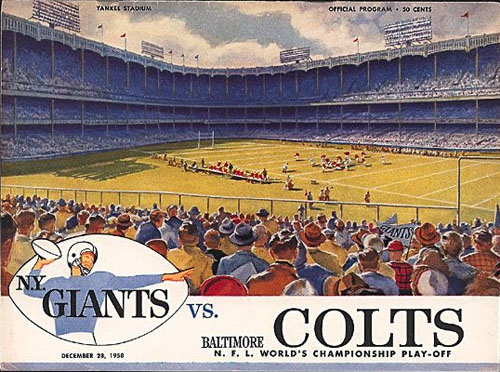
Baltimore Colts (Western) (9–3)	New York Giants (Eastern) (9–3)
23	17
Head coach: Weeb Ewbank	Head coach: Jim Lee Howell
	1	2	3	4	OT	Total
BAL	0	14	0	3	6	23
NYG	3	0	7	7	0	17
- Date: December 28, 1958
- Stadium: Yankee Stadium; Bronx, New York
- MVP: Johnny Unitas (Quarterback; Baltimore)
- Favorite: Colts by 3½ points
- Referee: Ron Gibbs
- Attendance: 64,185

TV in the United States
- Network: NBC
- Announcers: Chris Schenkel; Chuck Thompson

Radio in the United States
- Network: NBC
- Announcers: Joe Boland; Bill McColgan

Location in the United States

The 1958 NFL Championship Game was the 26th NFL championship game, played on December 28 at Yankee Stadium in New York City. It was the first NFL game to be decided in sudden death overtime. The Baltimore Colts won their first championship in franchise history over the New York Giants 23–17 in what soon became widely known as "the Greatest Game Ever Played". Its legendary status in the pantheon of historic NFL games was again confirmed by a nationwide poll of 66 media members in 2019, who voted it the best game in the league's first 100 years.

This was the ninth time the NFL Championship game had been on national television. An estimated 45 million viewers watched the 1958 Championship Game. There were 64,185 paying customers at the game, which was considerable fewer than a full house.

It marked the beginning of the NFL's popularity surge and eventual rise to the top of the United States sports market. A major reason was that the game was televised across the nation by NBC. Baltimore receiver Raymond Berry recorded 12 receptions for 178 yards and a touchdown. His 12 receptions set a championship record that stood for 55 years until it was broken by Denver Broncos wide receiver Demaryius Thomas in Super Bowl XLVIII. Unitas set the record for most passing yards in an NFL Championship Game with 349 prior to the dawn of the Super Bowl. The game also proved to be the only league championship decided in overtime until Super Bowl LI, 58 seasons later. It remains one of only three overtime championship games, along with Super Bowl LVIII, which occurred 65 seasons after the 1958 championship and seven seasons after Super Bowl LI.

== Background ==
Both teams finished the 1958 season with a 9–3 record. For the Giants, it was their fifth consecutive winning season, a stretch that included an NFL Championship in 1956. In contrast, 1958 was only the second winning season in Colts' history since the team's founding in 1953.

Baltimore started off the season winning their first six games before losing to New York, 24–21, in week 7 of the regular season. However, Colts starting quarterback Johnny Unitas was injured at the time and did not play in the game. Three weeks later, Unitas returned to lead the Colts to a critical come-from-behind win against Hall of Fame (and ex-Colt) quarterback Y. A. Tittle and his San Francisco 49ers. Trailing 27–7 at halftime, Baltimore stormed back with four unanswered touchdowns to win, 35–27, clinching the Western Conference championship; several Colt players such as Unitas and Moore cited the victory as their best of the year. This allowed them to rest their starters for the final two games of the regular season, both on the road in California.

New York started the season 2–2, then won seven of their last eight games, including a critical 19–17 win over the defending champion Detroit Lions on December 7. In that game, New York fell behind late when the offense lost a fumble that was returned for a touchdown. Later on, however, the Giants stopped Detroit punter Yale Lary on a fake punt attempt and drove for the go-ahead score. They then secured the win by blocking a Lions field goal attempt as time expired in the game. In the final game of the regular season, the Giants defeated the Cleveland Browns with Pat Summerall's game-winning 49-yard field goal on the final play (the longest field goal made in the entire season among all NFL kickers). The win enabled them to tie the Browns for the conference title, and though the Giants had won both games against Cleveland in the regular season, the rules of the time required a tiebreaker playoff game on December 21. At Yankee Stadium in 20 °F (−7 °C) weather, the Giants defeated the Browns for a third time in a shut out, building a 10–0 lead at the half, which was the final score.

After clinching their conference title on November 30, the Colts rested key players in the final two games, road losses in California. While Cleveland and New York played the Eastern tiebreaker game, Baltimore had the week off and entered the championship game as 3½ point favorites to gain their first league title.

== Game summary ==
The two teams combined for six turnovers in the first half (three on each side), with the Colts converting two fumbles by the Giants into touchdown drives to take a 14–3 lead at the half. After averting a three-score deficit thanks to a goal-line stand in the third quarter, the Giants rallied on consecutive touchdown drives to take a 17–14 lead early in the fourth quarter.

In the last two minutes of the game, Johnny Unitas led the Colts on a drive which concluded on a 20-yard field goal (the Colts' first in three attempts) with only seven seconds left on the clock to tie the game at 17–17. In the ensuing sudden-death overtime, the Giants went three-and-out after quarterback Charley Conerly came up short on a third down run. After getting the ball back on a punt, the Colts again drove down the field – this time for a touchdown, to win 23–17.

=== First half ===
The game got off to a rough start for both teams. On Baltimore's first drive, New York linebacker Sam Huff forced a fumble while sacking Johnny Unitas. Defensive back Jimmy Patton recovered the ball at the Colts 37. One play later, Baltimore took the ball back when defensive end Gino Marchetti forced a recovered fumble from quarterback Don Heinrich. But all the Colts managed to do with their next drive was lose another turnover when a Unitas pass was picked off by Lindon Crow. After forcing a punt, Unitas completed a 60-yard pass to Lenny Moore at the Giants' 26-yard line. But Baltimore's drive was halted at the 19 and Steve Myhra's field goal attempt was blocked by Huff.

On the Giants' next drive, Heinrich was replaced by Charley Conerly for the rest of the game. New York then drove to the Colts' 30-yard line, featuring a 38-yard run by Frank Gifford.

On third down, Conerly threw a pass to wide-open fullback Alex Webster, but he slipped before the ball arrived and it fell incomplete. Pat Summerall then kicked a 36-yard field goal to put New York on the board. In the second quarter, Baltimore defensive end Ray Krouse recovered a fumble from Gifford to set up a 2-yard touchdown run by Colts running back Alan Ameche. On their next drive, New York got a big scoring opportunity when they recovered a fumbled punt from Jackie Simpson on the Colts' 10-yard line. But a few plays later, Gifford fumbled again, and Baltimore lineman Don Joyce recovered on his own 14. The Colts subsequently drove 86 yards in 15 plays, including a 16-yard scramble by Unitas on 3rd and 7, to score on Unitas' 15-yard touchdown pass to Raymond Berry, giving them a 14–3 halftime lead.

That fumble by Gifford and the fumble later were forced by defensive back Milt Davis of the Colts—despite playing with two broken bones in his right foot—and both led to touchdowns for the Colts.

=== Second half ===
Steve Myhra of the Colts lines up the game-tying 20-yard field goal with 7 seconds remaining in regulation time.

Early in the third quarter, Baltimore reached the New York 1-yard line. But on third down, Ameche was stopped for no gain, and the Colts turned it over on downs after Ameche was tackled trying to go wide at the 5-yard line on a great play by linebacker Cliff Livingston, on a fourth-down halfback option play. It was a huge reversal of momentum.

The Giants then went 95-yards in just four plays, scoring on Mel Triplett's 1-yard touchdown run to cut the lead to 4, with a score of 14–10. The drive was highlighted by an unforgettable 86-yard pass play from deep within the Giants own territory at the closed end of the stadium: Quarterback Charlie Conerly threw to Kyle Rote downfield left-to-right across the middle where Rote then broke an arm tackle at about mid-field; then Rote fumbled when hit from behind at the Colts 25, but Webster, who was trailing the play, picked up the ball and ran it all the way to the 1-yard line where he was knocked out of bounds.

The Giants took a 17–14 lead early in the fourth quarter with Conerly's 46-yard completion to tight end Bob Schnelker setting up his 15-yard touchdown pass to Gifford. It was the first time in an NFL Championship Game that a team came from behind to take the lead after trailing by more than 10 points. On both of Baltimore's next drives, they moved the ball into scoring range but came up empty both times. First, they drove to the Giants' 39-yard line, only to have Bert Rechichar miss a 46-yard field goal. Then they got the ball back on the New York 42 following a fumble recovery by Joyce. But after driving to the 27-yard line, Unitas was sacked twice in a row (once by Andy Robustelli and once by Dick Modzelewski), moving the ball back 20 yards and pushing the Colts out of field goal range.

Faced with fourth down and inches on their own 40-yard on their ensuing drive, New York decided to punt with a little over two minutes left in the game (on the third-down play before the punt, Marchetti was knocked out of the game with a broken ankle. He refused to leave for medical treatment and watched the rest of the game sitting up on a stretcher on the sidelines). The Colts took over at their own 14-yard line and Unitas engineered one of the most famous drives in football history—a 2-minute drill before anyone called it that. After starting the drive with two incompletions, Unitas made a critical 11-yard completion to Moore on third down. Following one more incompletion, he threw three consecutive passes to Berry, moving the ball 62 yards to the Giants' 13-yard line. This set up a 20-yard tying field goal by Myhra with seven seconds left to send the game into sudden-death overtime—the first overtime game in NFL playoff history.

=== Overtime ===
Don Maynard received the opening kickoff for the Giants and muffed the catch, but recovered it on the Giants 20-yard line. Even in his autobiography You Can't Catch Sunshine, Maynard stated that he was not only disappointed in the botched attempt, but also at the commentators for saying he fumbled the ball due to their lack of knowledge of football and its terminology by not knowing the difference between a fumble and muffing the ball. After a three-and-out series, the Giants punted. On their ensuing drive, Baltimore drove 80 yards in 13 plays (all called by QB Johnny Unitas) on a tired NY defense. Ameche made several critical plays on the drive, catching an 8-yard pass on 3rd and 8 from the Colts 33, and later rushing 22 yards to the Giants 20-yard line. Berry also made a big impact, catching two passes for 33 yards, including a 12-yard reception on the New York 8. Following a 1-yard run by Ameche and a 6-yard catch by the tight end Jim Mutscheller, Ameche scored on a third-down 1-yard touchdown run with 6:45 left to win the game, 23–17.

During overtime, when the Colts were on the eight-yard line of the Giants, someone ran out onto the field of Yankee Stadium, causing the game to be delayed; rumors have stated that it was an NBC employee who was ordered to create a distraction because the national television feed had gone dead. The difficulty was the result of an unplugged TV signal cable, and the delay in the game bought NBC enough time to fix the problem before the next play.

=== Scoring summary ===
Sunday, December 28, 1958
Kickoff: 2:00 p.m. EST

- First quarter
  - NYG – FG Pat Summerall (36 yards), NYG 3–0
- Second quarter
  - BAL – Alan Ameche 2-yard run (Steve Myhra kick), BAL 7–3
  - BAL – Raymond Berry 15-yard pass from Johnny Unitas (Myhra kick), BAL 14–3
- Third quarter
  - NYG – Mel Triplett 1-yard run (Summerall kick), BAL 14–10
- Fourth quarter
  - NYG – Frank Gifford 15-yard pass from Charley Conerly (Summerall kick), NYG 17–14
  - BAL – FG Myhra (20 yards), Tie 17–17
- Overtime
  - BAL – Alan Ameche 1-yard run, BAL 23–17

== Officials ==
- Referee: Ron Gibbs
- Umpire: Lou Palazzi
- Head linesman: Charlie Berry
- Back judge: Cleo Diehl
- Field judge: Chuck Sweeney

The NFL had five game officials in 1958; the line judge was added in 1965 and the side judge in 1978.

== Players' shares ==
The gross receipts for the game, including $200,000 for radio and television rights, were over $698,000, the highest to date. Each player on the winning Colts team received $4,718 (equivalent to $53,000 in 2025), while Giants players made $3,111 each (equivalent to $35,000 in 2025).

== Players in the Hall of Fame ==
Seventeen individuals (including coaches and administration) who were involved in this game are members of the Pro Football Hall of Fame. Along with those named above, Giants offensive coordinator Vince Lombardi and defensive coordinator Tom Landry were later inducted as head coaches.

== Aftermath ==
=== Baltimore Colts ===
Baltimore head coach Weeb Ewbank led the Colts to a second straight championship game win over New York the next season. He was fired from the Colts after the 1962 season (7–7), and moved to the AFL's New York Jets, formerly Titans, in 1963. In the 1968 season, Ewbank led the AFL champion Jets to victory over the Colts in Super Bowl III, also considered a monumental victory in the history of pro football.

Unitas led the Colts to the Super Bowl V championship after the 1970 season and remained with the franchise through 1972.

=== New York Giants ===
The Giants head coach was Jim Lee Howell, and he was aided by two coordinators who went on to greatness themselves. The defensive coordinator was Tom Landry, who left the team in 1960 to take over the expansion Dallas Cowboys. He led them to two Super Bowl championships in the 1970s, and was the runner-up in two NFL championship games (1966, 1967) and three Super Bowls in his three decades as head coach. The offensive coordinator was Vince Lombardi, who left the team following the game to take the head coaching position with the Green Bay Packers in January 1959. Lombardi led the Packers to five championships in the 1960s, including the first two Super Bowls, and had the Super Bowl Trophy named after him after his death. In order to advance to both of those Super Bowls, Lombardi's Packers needed to defeat Landry's Cowboys in the 1966 and 1967 NFL championship games.

New York's fortunes would take a turn for the worse after this game. They made it to the NFL championship game four times over the next five seasons, but lost each one, including a loss to the Colts in 1959. They would not win their next playoff game until the 1981 postseason.

== Legacy ==
=== Popularity of pro football ===
An estimated 45 million people watched the game on television in the United States. This audience could have been even greater except that because of NFL restrictions, the game was blacked out in the greater New York City area. Still, the impact from this game is far reaching. A year later, Texas billionaire Lamar Hunt formed the American Football League, which began play with eight teams in the 1960 season. The growth of the popularity of the sport, through franchise expansion, the eventual merger with the AFL, and popularity on television, is commonly credited to this game, making it a turning point in the history of football. NFL Commissioner Pete Rozelle was said by Giants owner Wellington Mara to have attributed professional football's surge in popularity to the game, because it "happened just at that time, in that season, and it happened in New York".

=== Two-minute drill ===
The drive by Baltimore at the end of regulation, with Unitas leading the team quickly down the field to set up the game-tying field goal, is often cited as the first instance of a "two-minute drill", for which Unitas became famous.

=== Overtime games ===
The game is, to date, one of only three NFL championship games—the others being Super Bowl LI and Super Bowl LVIII—ever decided in overtime (the 1962 AFL Championship Game also went into overtime and eventually double overtime). In Super Bowl LI the New England Patriots beat the Atlanta Falcons, 34–28, just 3:58 into overtime. In Super Bowl LVIII, the Kansas City Chiefs defeated the San Francisco 49ers, 25–22, with three seconds left in the first overtime period.

As Unitas later stated, the players had never heard of overtime before the game. "When the game ended in a tie, we were standing on the sidelines waiting to see what came next. All of a sudden, the officials came over and said, 'Send the captain out. We're going to flip a coin to see who will receive.' That was the first we heard of the overtime period." An NFL preseason exhibition game played three years earlier in Portland, Oregon, had been settled by a sudden-death overtime, but this was the first time an NFL game of any significance needed overtime to determine a winner. Sudden death overtime had been approved for the NFL championship game in 1946 but never used before.

=== 50th anniversary ===
Writer Mark Bowden, at the urging of his editor Morgan Entrekin, set out to write a book about the game in 2006, looking ahead to the 50th anniversary. Bowden credited Sports Illustrated writer Tex Maule with the "best game ever" phrase which he chose for his book title. Eagles' coach Andy Reid helped him analyze the film footage he was able to secure. Bowden said that while many who played in the game whom he interviewed (particularly Giants) maybe quibbled with the "best" characterization, they, "to a man, remark[ed] on how radically the popularity of the game jumped after that season." Bowden dedicated his book to David Halberstam. Halberstam's book The Fifties provided source information and context for The Best Game Ever, and Halberstam's sports books also were inspiring to Bowden. When asked about any insight writing the book had given him, Bowden remarked in part, "I wonder, if you got a group of New York Giants from 2006 or ’07 together 50 years from now, whether you would get the same sort of hilarity and knee-slapping comradeship that you find still exists among these [surviving 1958-game-veteran] players."

ESPN presented this game to a national audience on December 13, 2008. This presentation is a two-hour documentary which includes restored footage with colorization as well as a living room approach which included players past and present and fans. This was put together by ESPN Films and NFL Films. Expert Jeffrey Muttart was asked to reconstruct the controversial call on the field, and after research and utilization of today's technology, he denied the Giants' first down (therefore, the call made by the officials was correct).

== In popular culture ==
The game plays a role in a 1991 episode of The Adventures of Pete & Pete titled "Space, Geeks and Johnny Unitas." A new kid in school gets Big Pete and Ellen fascinated by the possible universal significance of Johnny Unitas and the 1958 game. At one point, Big Pete questions a confused Art Donovan (himself) about Unitas' accomplishments in that game.

== Final statistics ==
Source:The NFL's Official Encyclopedic History of Professional Football, (1974), p. 111, Macmillan Publishing Co. New York, NY, LCCN 73-3862 The boxscore can be found on Pro-Football-reference.com https://www.pro-football-reference.com/boxscores/195812280nyg.htm

=== Statistical comparison ===
	Baltimore Colts	New York Giants
First downs	27	10
First downs rushing	9	3
First downs passing	17	7
First downs penalty	1	0
Total yards	500	288
Passing yards	361	200
Passing – Completions-attempts	26–40	12–18
Passing – Yards per attempt	9.0	11.1
Interceptions-return yards	0–0	1–5
Rushing yards	139	88
Rushing attempts	38	31
Yards per rush	3.6	2.8
Penalties-yards	3–15	2–22
Fumbles-lost	2–2	6–4
Punts-Average	4–50.8	6–45.6

=== Individual statistics ===
Colts Passing
	Comp/Att	Yds	TD	INT
Johnny Unitas	26/40	361	1	1
Colts Rushing
	Rush	Yds	Avg	TD
Alan Ameche	14	59	4.21	2
L.G. Dupre	11	30	2.72	0
Johnny Unitas	4	26	6.5	0
Lenny Moore	9	24	2.67	0
Colts Receiving
	Rec	Yds	Avg	TD
Raymond Berry	12	178	14.83	1
Lenny Moore	5	99	19.8	0
Jim Mutscheller	4	63	15.75	0
Alan Ameche	3	14	4.67	0
L.G. Dupre	2	7	3.5	0

Giants Passing
	Comp/Att	Yds	TD	INT
Charlie Conerly	10/14	187	1	0
Don Heinrich	2/4	13	0	0
Giants Rushing
	Rush	Yds	Avg	TD
Frank Gifford	12	60	5.0	0
Alex Webster	9	24	2.67	0
Mel Triplett	5	12	2.4	1
Charlie Conerly	2	5	2.5	0
Phil King	3	–13	–4.33	0
Giants Receiving
	Rec	Yds	Avg	TD
Frank Gifford	3	14	4.67	1
Kyle Rote	2	76	38.0	0
Bob Schnelker	2	63	31.5	0
Alex Webster	2	17	8.5	0
Mel Triplett	2	15	7.5	0
Ken MacAfee	1	15	15.0	0

== See also ==
- 1958 NFL playoffs
- List of nicknamed NFL games and plays

== Bibliography ==
- Bowden, Mark (2008), The Best Game Ever: Giants vs. Colts, 1958, and the Birth of the Modern NFL. Atlantic Monthly Press. ISBN 978-0-87113-988-7
- Gifford, Frank and Richmond, Peter, The Glory Game: How the 1958 NFL Championship Changed Football Forever. HarperCollins
- Lyons, Robert S. (2010). On Any Given Sunday, A Life of Bert Bell. Philadelphia:Temple University Press. ISBN 978-1-59213-731-2
- Steadman, John F. (1988). The Greatest Football Game Ever Played: When the Baltimore Colts and the New York Giants Faced Sudden Death. Baltimore: Press Box Publishers.
