= Jack Call =

American football player (born 1935)

No. 25, 20
- Position: Halfback

Personal information
- Born: July 30, 1935 (age 91); Cortland, New York, U.S.
- Listed height: 6 ft 1 in (1.85 m)
- Listed weight: 200 lb (91 kg)

Career information
- High school: Cortland
- College: Colgate
- NFL draft: 1957: 13th round, 151st overall pick

Career history
- Baltimore Colts (1957–1958); Pittsburgh Steelers (1959)

Awards and highlights
- NFL champion (1958)

Career NFL statistics
- Rushing yards: 308
- Rushing average: 4.2
- Receptions: 9
- Receiving yards: 46
- Stats at Pro Football Reference

John Arthur Call (born July 30, 1935) is an American former professional football player who was a halfback for the Baltimore Colts and Pittsburgh Steelers of the National Football League (NFL). He played college football for the Colgate Raiders after attending Cortland High School.
