= Jerry Mertens =

American football player (1936–2021)

- Mertens in 1961

No. 80
- Position: Defensive back

Personal information
- Born: January 5, 1936; Racine, Wisconsin, U.S.
- Died: 5 September 2021 (aged 85); San Mateo, California, U.S.
- Listed height: 6 ft 0 in (1.83 m)
- Listed weight: 184 lb (83 kg)

Career information
- High school: St. Catherine's (Racine)
- College: Drake
- NFL draft: 1958: 20th round, 239th overall pick

Career history
- San Francisco 49ers (1958–1965)

Awards and highlights
- Pro Bowl (1958)

Career NFL statistics
- Interceptions: 8
- Fumble recoveries: 2
- Total touchdowns: 1
- Stats at Pro Football Reference

Jerome William Mertens (January 5, 1936 – September 5, 2021) was an American professional football player who was a defensive back for eight seasons with the San Francisco 49ers of the National Football League (NFL).

He was named to the 1958 Pro Bowl at the end of his rookie season and started at left cornerback for the 49ers in all but four games of his first five years in the league. After missing the entire 1963 season with a knee injury, Mertens returned as a reserve defensive back, playing a great deal at the safety position.

== Early life ==
Mertens, a high-school standout at Racine Saint Catherine's, graduated from Drake University in 1958, and received the Holmes Cowper Trophy, which is given to the graduating letter-winner who has the highest grade-point average. He graduated from Drake with a Bachelor of Science degree in education in 1958.

Mertens was blessed with quick reflexes and excellent speed, having been clocked at 9.8 seconds in the 100-yard dash during his time at Drake.

== Professional career ==
In the 1958 NFL draft he was selected in the 20th round as the 239th overall pick by the San Francisco 49ers. In the 1958 season that followed, Mertens started all 12 games for the Niners at left cornerback, grabbing two interceptions and recording one fumble recovery. He was named to the 1958 Pro Bowl following the season and was part of the Western Conference's 26–7 victory over the Eastern Conference in that contest.

Mertens started at left cornerback in 60 of the 64 games played by the 49ers during his first five years in the league. The 49ers, noting his tackling ability, had converted Mertens from left cornerback to strong safety during training camp. "I've never played safety before," Mertens told a bay area sports page editor, "but I like it — and I think I'm getting the hang of it." He remained one of the fastest players on the squad, clocked in pre-season running a 40-yard dash in full game gear in 4.9 seconds — tied for third best on the team.

Mertens had high expectations for the 49ers squad in 1963, noting that "We're going to be a lot stronger than anyone thinks. For one thing, we have better spirit, and that will make for a better performance. More important, we're deeper. Injuries killed us last season — we can stand a few injuries this season without being hurt too much."

Unfortunately for Mertens, it would be his turn to suffer the brutal wrath of the football gods when he suffered a serious knee injury in the last preseason game of the year against the Los Angeles Rams. The injury, initially misdiagnosed as a left knee sprain, caused Mertens to miss the entire 1963 campaign.

Although the torn ligaments in his knee were surgically repaired and he was able to rehabilitate his injury and come back in 1964, he was not the same player and saw himself limited to reserve duty for all 14 games that year.

As the 1965 season approached, Mertens again saw himself penciled in as starter for the 49ers. Right cornerback Abe Woodson had been traded away to the St. Louis Cardinals in exchange for running back John David Crow, opening up a place at the top of the team's depth chart. Mertens started 8 games for the team at right cornerback during the year and saw action in 13.

His action during the latter part of the season was limited by a pulled hamstring that he suffered in the November 7 game in the Cotton Bowl against the Dallas Cowboys. It was not until the final game of the season, at home against the Green Bay Packers, that Mertens was healed up well enough to return to the starting lineup.

The Green Bay game closing the 1965 season would be Mertens' last. As Mertens filled into the box from his safety position to make a tackle on sweeping Packer fullback Jim Taylor at the line of scrimmage, Taylor's knee hit Mertens in the helmet. Mertens felt a sharp pain in his neck, forcing him to the sidelines for the rest of the day. It would be four days before x-rays revealed a cracked vertebrae in Mertens' neck. Several weeks in the hospital in traction resulted.

According to Mertens' brother, Bob, a total of 72 x-rays were taken to diagnose the injury, with doctors stating that if the break had been an inch or two lower, it might have proved fatal. It was revealed early in January 1966 that Mertens would soon be leaving the hospital after being fitted in a body cast that would "extend from his hips to over his head" — and which would remain on for "a long, long time." Twelve weeks later he was freed from the cast and fitted with a lighter brace, finally allowed to move his neck slightly.

After 8 years in the NFL, with 7 years of service, the 30-year old Jerry Merten's professional football career was over.

== Life after football ==
After retiring from the NFL, Mertens settled into a career as a fertilizer broker and working for kids' programs as a member of the NFL Alumni. Jerry was inducted into St. Catherine's High School's Athletic Hall of Fame in 1998, and the Racine County Sports Hall of Fame in 2013.

Mertens married the former Karen Kae Tavenner on March 17, 1956. Together the couple raised three children and now have four grandchildren in the San Francisco bay area.

He served as president of the NFL Alumni Association, a position he held for over 10 years.

He died on September 5, 2021, at the age of 85.
