= 1958 Cleveland Browns season =

NFL team season

- Head coach: Paul Brown
- Home stadium: Cleveland Stadium

Results
- Record: 9–3
- Division place: T-1st Eastern
- Playoffs: Lost Eastern Conference Playoff (at Giants) 0–10
- Pro Bowlers: Lou Groza, LT/K; Don Colo, DT; Don Paul, CB; Walt Michaels, LB; Jim Ray Smith, G Bob Gain, DT; Jim Brown, FB

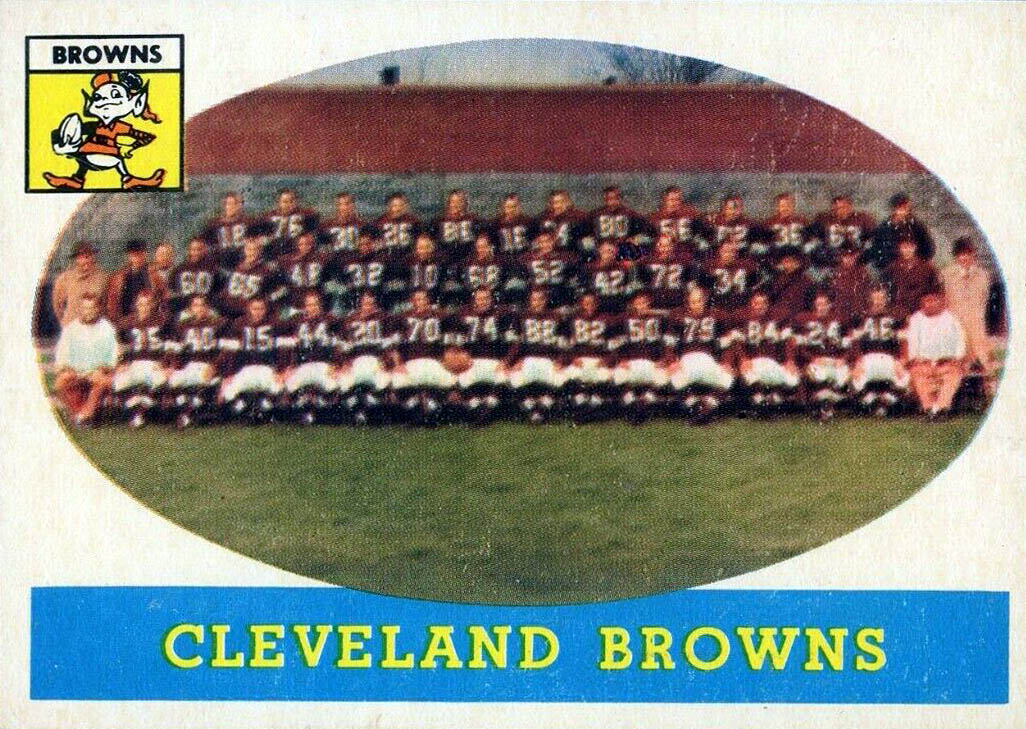
The Browns team

The 1958 Cleveland Browns season was the team's ninth season with the National Football League. They were 9–3 in the regular season, tied for first in the Eastern Conference with the New York Giants, in the tiebreaker playoff the Giants won 10–0.

== Exhibition schedule ==
Game	Date	Opponent	Result	Record	Venue	Attendance	Sources
1	August 16	vs. Pittsburgh Steelers at Akron	W 10–0	1–0		27,202	
2	August 22	at Detroit Lions	L 17–7	1–1		36,662	
3	August 29	at Los Angeles Rams	W 13–10	2–1		41,387	
4	September 7	at San Francisco 49ers	L 21–16	2–2		31,339	
5	September 12	at Chicago Bears	L 42–31	2–3		52,669	
6	September 20	Detroit Lions	W 41–7	3–3		35,343	

== Regular season ==
- Tommy O’Connell was the first MVP to be cut from a team before the start of the following season.

== Schedule ==
Game	Date	Opponent	Result	Record	Venue	Attendance	Recap	Sources
1	September 28	at Los Angeles Rams	**W** 30–27	1–0	L.A. Memorial Coliseum	69,993	Recap	
2	October 5	at **Pittsburgh Steelers**	**W** 45–12	2–0	Forbes Field	31,130	Recap	
3	October 12	**Chicago Cardinals**	**W** 35–28	3–0	Cleveland Stadium	65,403	Recap	
4	October 19	**Pittsburgh Steelers**	**W** 27–10	4–0	Cleveland Stadium	66,852	Recap	
5	October 26	at **Chicago Cardinals**	**W** 38–24	5–0	Comiskey Park	30,933	Recap	
6	November 2	**New York Giants**	**L** 17–21	5–1	Cleveland Stadium	78,404	Recap	
7	November 9	Detroit Lions	**L** 10–30	5–2	Cleveland Stadium	75,563	Recap	
8	November 16	at **Washington Redskins**	**W** 20–10	6–2	Griffith Stadium	32,372	Recap	
9	November 23	**Philadelphia Eagles**	**W** 28–14	7–2	Cleveland Stadium	51,319	Recap	
10	November 30	**Washington Redskins**	**W** 21–14	8–2	Cleveland Stadium	33,240	Recap	
11	December 7	at **Philadelphia Eagles**	**W** 21–14	9–2	Franklin Field	36,773	Recap	
12	December 14	at **New York Giants**	**L** 10–13	9–3	Yankee Stadium	63,192	Recap	
Note: Intra-conference opponents are in **bold** text.

=== Season summary ===
For the second straight year, one of their rivals had gotten revenge for something that had happened earlier in the decade.

After the Detroit Lions whipped the Browns 59–14 in the 1957 NFL Championship Game to atone for the 56–10 pounding they had absorbed from Cleveland in the title contest three years earlier, the 1958 New York Giants took their turn. The Giants shut out the Browns 10–0 in a tiebreaker playoff game at Yankee Stadium to determine the Eastern Conference champion. The last time the two teams met in such a special playoff contest was 1950, when Cleveland edged New York 8–3 to win the title in the American Conference, the forerunner of the Eastern Conference, and advance to the league championship game.

As was the case in 1950, the 1958 Giants also beat Cleveland twice during the regular season, 21–17 and 13–10, and the teams tied for first with a 9–3 record. The Browns went into the latter game at 9–2, needing a tie (or a win) to clinch the conference crown, and led 7–0 early in the first quarter and 10–3 in the fourth quarter. Future broadcaster Pat Summerall kicked a 49-yard field goal in a snowstorm to provide the win, even though he made barely 50 percent (12-of-23) of his attempts during the regular season. Seven days later in the tiebreaker playoff, Summerall added a 26-yard field goal in a game highlighted by the fact the Giants held hall of fame running back Jim Brown to a career-low eight yards rushing on seven carries, and limited the Browns to just 86 yards of total offense.

In the following week's NFL Championship Game at Yankee Stadium, later dubbed "The Greatest Game Ever Played," the Giants lost 23–17 in overtime to the Baltimore Colts.

Aside from the three losses to the Giants, the only team to beat the Browns in 1958 were the Detroit Lions, who gained a 30–10 decision midway through the year.

=== Standings ===
Program for the October 19 game against the visiting Pittsburgh Steelers.

NFL Eastern Conference
	W	L	T	PCT	CONF	PF	PA	STK
New York Giants	9	3	0	.750	7–3	246	183	W4
Cleveland Browns	9	3	0	.750	8–2	302	217	L1
Pittsburgh Steelers	7	4	1	.636	6–3–1	261	230	W1
Washington Redskins	4	7	1	.364	3–6–1	214	268	W1
Chicago Cardinals	2	9	1	.182	2–7–1	261	356	L6
Philadelphia Eagles	2	9	1	.182	2–7–1	235	306	L4

Note: Tie games were not officially counted in the standings until 1972.

== Playoffs ==
This game was an unscheduled tiebreaker game to determine the Western conference title.

Round	Date	Opponent	Result	Record	Venue	Attendance	Recap	Sources
Conference	December 21	at New York Giants	L 0–10	0–1	Yankee Stadium	61,174	Recap	

== Roster ==
1958 Cleveland Browns roster
Quarterbacks: 15 Jim Ninowski; 16 Milt Plum; Running backs: 32 Jim Brown; 45 Leroy Bolden; 30 Lew Carpenter; 49 Bobby Mitchell; 36 Ed Modzelewski; 26 Ray Renfro; Receivers: 88 Pete Brewster; 40 Preston Carpenter; 82 Frank Clarke	Offensive linemen: 76 Lou Groza T/K; 66 Gene Hickerson G; 56 Art Hunter C; 78 Willie McClung T/DT; 74 Mike McCormack T; 65 Chuck Noll G; 64 Jim Ray Smith G; Defensive linemen: 70 Don Colo DT; 77 Willie Davis DE/T; 79 Bob Gain DT/DE; 72 Henry Jordan DT/DE; 84 Dave Liddick DE/DT; 86 Paul Wiggin DE/DT	Linebackers: 54 Tom Catlin MLB; 50 Vince Costello MLB; 35 Galen Fiss OLB; 34 Walt Michaels OLB; Defensive backs: 18 Bobby Freeman CB/S; 22 Ken Konz S; 24 Warren Lahr CB; 20 Don Paul CB; 44 Jim Shofner CB; 42 Junior Wren S; Special teams: 28 Dick Deschaine P	Reserve list: -- Farrell Funston WR (Left squad); -- Roddy Osborne QB (Military); 84 Bill Quinlan DE (IR); rookies in italics
