= 1958 NFL playoffs =

American football tournament

- Dates: December 21-28, 1958
- Season: 1958
- Teams: 3
- Games played: 2
- NFL Championship Game site: Yankee Stadium; Bronx, New York
- Defending champions: Detroit Lions (did not qualify)
- Champion: Baltimore Colts (1st title)
- Runner-up: New York Giants
- Conference runners-up: Cleveland Browns
NFL playoffs
← 1957	1965 →

The 1958 National Football League season resulted in a tie for the Eastern Conference championship between the Cleveland Browns and the New York Giants, both at 9–3, requiring a one-game playoff. The Giants swept both games during the regular season, including a 13–10 win on December 14 at Yankee Stadium. Injured kicker Pat Summerall made a 49-yard field goal late in the game in a snowstorm to break the tie and force the playoff.

This conference championship game was played on December 21 at Yankee Stadium; the winner then hosted the idle Baltimore Colts (9–3), champions of the Western Conference, in the NFL Championship Game on December 28.

== Tournament bracket ==
Eastern Conference playoff December 21			NFL Championship; December 28
			W	Baltimore	23*
E	Cleveland	0	E	New York	17
E	New York	10

- * Overtime period

Both games were at Yankee Stadium in New York City

== Eastern Conference championship ==
New York Giants 10, Cleveland Browns 0

Quarter	1	2	3	4	Total
Browns	0	0	0	0	0
Giants	7	3	0	0	10

at Yankee Stadium in Bronx, New York

- Date: December 21, 1958
- Game attendance: 61,274
- ProFootballReference

Game information

Scoring

First quarter

- NY – Charlie Conerly 10-yard rush (Summerall kick). Giants 7–0

Second quarter

- NY – Pat Summerall 26-yard field goal. Giants 10–0

Third quarter

- no scoring

Fourth quarter

- no scoring

Top passers

- CLE – Milt Plum – 7/12, 83 yards, 2 INT
- NY – Charlie Conerly – 7/11, 75 yards

Top rushers

- CLE – Milt Plum – 3 rushes, 13 yards
- NY – Frank Gifford – 23 rushes, 95 yards

Top receivers

- CLE – Pete Brewster – 3 receptions, 56 yards
- NY – Bob Schnelker – 2 receptions, 46 yards

Both teams turned the ball over four times, with three Browns interceptions (one from Jim Ninowski and two from Milt Plum) and a fumble matching the Giants throwing two of their own from Don Heinrich to go with two lost fumbles. Charlie Conerly scored the only touchdown of the game on a 10-yard run.
