= Ed Sutton (American football) =

American football player (1935–2008)

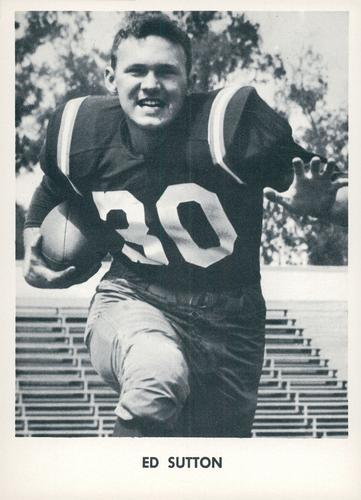

No. 30, 26
- Positions: Halfback, defensive back

Personal information
- Born: March 16, 1935; Sylva, North Carolina, U.S.
- Died: September 20, 2008 (aged 73); Redwood City, California, U.S.
- Listed height: 6 ft 1 in (1.85 m)
- Listed weight: 205 lb (93 kg)

Career information
- High school: Cullowhee (Sylva)
- College: North Carolina
- NFL draft: 1957: 3rd round, 33rd overall pick

Career history
- Washington Redskins (1957–1959); New York Giants (1960); Green Bay Packers (1961)*
- * Offseason or practice squad member only

Awards and highlights
- First-team All-ACC (1956)

Career NFL statistics
- Rushing yards: 1,109
- Rushing average: 3.9
- Receptions: 14
- Receiving yards: 237
- Total touchdowns: 10
- Stats at Pro Football Reference

Edward Wike Sutton (March 16, 1935 – September 20, 2008) was an American professional football player who was a halfback and defensive back in the National Football League (NFL) for the Washington Redskins and the New York Giants. He played college football at the University of North Carolina and was selected in the third round of the 1957 NFL draft.

Even while playing professional football, Sutton began attending medical school, then after graduation from the University of Tennessee, he began a practice in Gardena, California. He left the practice for two years when he was drafted into the U.S. Army Medical Corps, where he served two years in a Mobile Army Surgical Hospital unit in Vietnam. Relocating in 1978, he started his long-time occupational medicine practice in Fresno, California, known as Valley Industrial and Family Medical Group.

In 1999 Sutton was inducted into the North Carolina Sports Hall of Fame. For decades he was active in the NFL Alumni Association, and was a recipient of the NFL Alumni Career Achievement Award. A few months prior to his death, he completed his autobiography entitled "Tales of the Comet: The Fast-Paced Life of Ed Sutton," in conjunction with Bob Terrell.

Sutton died September 20, 2008, at Sequoyah Cardiac Surgery Hospital in Redwood City, due to complications following heart bypass surgery.

== NFL career statistics ==
Legend
**Bold**	Career high

Year	Team	Games		Rushing					Receiving				
Year	Team	GP	GS	Att	Yds	Avg	Lng	TD	Rec	Yds	Avg	Lng	TD
1957	WAS	12	8	**108**	**407**	3.8	31	**5**	2	32	16.0	17	**1**
1958	WAS	10	8	93	335	3.6	18	3	**6**	**112**	**18.7**	**26**	0
1959	WAS	11	11	61	232	3.8	30	1	4	63	15.8	**26**	0
1960	NYG	12	3	20	135	**6.8**	**44**	0	2	30	15.0	16	0
Career		45	30	282	1,109	3.9	44	9	14	237	16.9	26	1
