= John Wittenborn =

American football player (1936–2016)

No. 66, 62, 67
- Positions: Guard, placekicker

Personal information
- Born: March 1, 1936; Sparta, Illinois, U.S.
- Died: March 29, 2016 (aged 80); Carbondale, Illinois, U.S.
- Listed height: 6 ft 2 in (1.88 m)
- Listed weight: 238 lb (108 kg)

Career information
- High school: Sparta
- College: Southeast Missouri State
- NFL draft: 1958: 17th round, 203rd overall pick

Career history
- San Francisco 49ers (1958–1960); Philadelphia Eagles (1960-1962); Houston Oilers (1964-1968)

Awards and highlights
- NFL champion (1960)

Career NFL/AFL statistics
- Games played: 120
- Games started: 42
- Fumble recoveries: 2
- Stats at Pro Football Reference

John Otis Wittenborn (March 1, 1936 – March 29, 2016) was a professional American football kicker in the National Football League (NFL) for the San Francisco 49ers and the Philadelphia Eagles. He also played in the American Football League (AFL) for the Houston Oilers. He is known by his peers as one of the greatest dual threat players in the history of the sport.

== See also ==
- Other American Football League players
