= Proverb Jacobs =

American football player (1935–2016)

No. 67, 73, 75, 77
- Positions: Offensive tackle, defensive tackle

Personal information
- Born: May 25, 1935; Marksville, Louisiana, U.S.
- Died: April 18, 2016 (aged 80); Oakland, California, U.S.
- Listed height: 6 ft 4 in (1.93 m)
- Listed weight: 258 lb (117 kg)

Career information
- High school: Oakland Tech
- College: California (1956–1957)
- NFL draft: 1958: 2nd round, 17th overall pick

Career history

Playing
- Philadelphia Eagles (1958); New York Giants (1960); New York Titans (1961–1962); Oakland Raiders (1963–1964)

Coaching
- San Jose Apaches (1967) Assistant coach

Career NFL/AFL statistics
- Games played: 54
- Games started: 33
- Fumble recoveries: 1
- Stats at Pro Football Reference

Proverb Gabriel Jacobs Jr. (May 25, 1935 – April 18, 2016) was an American football offensive and defensive lineman in the National Football League (NFL) for the Philadelphia Eagles and the New York Giants. He also played in the American Football League (AFL) for the New York Titans and the Oakland Raiders. Jacobs played college football at Modesto Junior College and the University of California. He was drafted 17th overall in the second round of the 1958 NFL draft. Jacobs self-published his memoir, Autobiography of an Unknown Football Player, in 2014. He died in 2016 at the age of 80.

Jacobs was also an All-American shot putter for the California Golden Bears track and field team, finishing 7th at the 1958 NCAA Track and Field Championships.
