= 1958 Washington Redskins season =

NFL team season

- Owner: George Preston Marshall
- General manager: Dick McCann
- Head coach: Joe Kuharich
- Home stadium: Griffith Stadium

Results
- Record: 4–7–1
- Division place: 4th NFL Eastern
- Playoffs: Did not qualify

The 1958 Washington Redskins season was the franchise's 27th season in the National Football League. The team failed to improve on their 5–6–1 record from 1957 and finished 4–7–1. This was the first season to feature the feather logo on the back of the helmet.

From the 1955 season until 1962, the Redskins were the last bastion of racial segregation in the NFL, refusing to include black players on their roster, unlike the other 12 teams in the league.

== Preseason ==
Week	Date	Opponent	Result	Record	Venue	Attendance
1	August 16	at Los Angeles Rams	L 10–31	0–1	Los Angeles Memorial Coliseum	73,164
2	August 23	vs. San Francisco 49ers	L 19–20	0–2	Multnomah Stadium (Portland, OR)	25,442
3	August 29	at Baltimore Colts	W 27–7	1–2	Baltimore Memorial Stadium	18,131
4	September 6	vs. Philadelphia Eagles	W 35–31	2–2	Gator Bowl Stadium (Jacksonville, FL)	26,242
5	September 13	vs. Green Bay Packers	W 23–14	3–2	Bowman Gray Stadium (Winston-Salem, NC)	12,000
6	September 21	Chicago Bears	L 24–27	3–3	Griffith Stadium	15,168

== Regular season ==
=== Schedule ===
Week	Date	Opponent	Result	Record	Venue	Attendance	Recap
1	September 28	at **Philadelphia Eagles**	**W** 24–14	1–0	Franklin Field	36,853	Recap
2	October 4	at **Chicago Cardinals**	**L** 10–37	1–1	Comiskey Park	21,824	Recap
3	October 12	**New York Giants**	**L** 14–21	1–2	Griffith Stadium	30,348	Recap
4	October 19	Green Bay Packers	**W** 37–21	2–2	Griffith Stadium	25,228	Recap
5	October 26	at Baltimore Colts	**L** 10–35	2–3	Memorial Stadium	54,403	Recap
6	November 2	at **Pittsburgh Steelers**	**L** 16–24	2–4	Forbes Field	19,525	Recap
7	November 9	**Chicago Cardinals**	**W** 45–31	3–4	Griffith Stadium	26,196	Recap
8	November 16	**Cleveland Browns**	**L** 10–20	3–5	Griffith Stadium	32,372	Recap
9	November 23	at **New York Giants**	**L** 0–30	3–6	Yankee Stadium	46,752	Recap
10	November 30	at **Cleveland Browns**	**L** 14–21	3–7	Cleveland Municipal Stadium	33,240	Recap
11	December 7	**Pittsburgh Steelers**	**T** 14–14	3–7–1	Griffith Stadium	23,370	Recap
12	December 14	**Philadelphia Eagles**	**W** 20–0	4–7–1	Griffith Stadium	22,621	Recap
Note: Intra-conference opponents are in **bold** text.

=== Standings ===
Program for the December 7 matchup with the Pittsburgh Steelers.

NFL Eastern Conference
	W	L	T	PCT	CONF	PF	PA	STK
New York Giants	9	3	0	.750	7–3	246	183	W4
Cleveland Browns	9	3	0	.750	8–2	302	217	L1
Pittsburgh Steelers	7	4	1	.636	6–3–1	261	230	W1
Washington Redskins	4	7	1	.364	3–6–1	214	268	W1
Chicago Cardinals	2	9	1	.182	2–7–1	261	356	L6
Philadelphia Eagles	2	9	1	.182	2–7–1	235	306	L4

Note: Tie games were not officially counted in the standings until 1972.

== Personnel ==
=== Roster ===
1958 Washington Redskins roster
Quarterbacks (QB): 3 Ralph Guglielmi QB; 14 Eddie LeBaron; Running backs (RB): 31 Don Bosseler; 0 Johnny Olszewski; 24 Jim Podoley; 30 Ed Sutton; 41 Sid Watson; Wide receivers (WR): 42 Bill Anderson; 81 Joe Walton; Tight ends (TE)	Offensive linemen (OL): 70 Ray Lemek T; 73 John Miller T/DT/DE; 51 Jim Schrader C; 60 Dick Stanfel G; 67 Red Stephens G; 66 Ed Voytek G/T; Defensive linemen (DL): 80 Gene Brito DE; 89 Bob Dee DE; 88 Chet Ostrowski DE/DT; 71 Will Renfro DT; 72 Jim Weatherall DT	Linebackers (LB): 52 Johnny Allen OLB/MLB/C; 56 Charlie Brueckman OLB; 36 Chuck Drazenovich MLB; 45 Ralph Felton OLB; 54 Bill Fulcher OLB; Defensive backs (DB): 40 Gene Cichowski CB; 47 Dick James S/RB; 25 Dick Lynch CB; 20 Doyle Nix CB; 27 Les Walters CB; 29 Bert Zagers S/CB/RB; Special teams (ST): 49 Sam Baker K/P	Reserve: 62 Don Boll T (IR); 82 Johnny Carson WR (IR); -- Stan Flowers RB (IR); -- John Paluck DE/DT (Military); 28 Joe Scudero S/RB (IR); Rookies in italics
