= 1958 Green Bay Packers season =

NFL team season

- Owner: Green Bay Football Corp. Dominic Olejniczak (President)
- General manager: Verne Lewellen
- Head coach: Ray McLean
- Home stadium: City Stadium; Milwaukee County Stadium

Results
- Record: 1–10–1
- Division place: 6th NFL Western
- Playoffs: Did not qualify

The 1958 Green Bay Packers season was their 40th season overall and their 38th season in the National Football League. The team finished with a 1–10–1 record under first-year head coach Ray McLean for a last-place finish in the league in 1958 and the worst record ever posted by a Packers team.

In the immortal words of New York sportswriter and Green Bay native Red Smith: "they overwhelmed one opponent, under-whelmed ten, and whelmed one." The tie came in week two and the three-point win in week five; during the seven-game losing streak to end the season the Packers lost by an average margin of over 22 points and got no closer than ten. The Packers finished 1958 allowing a league-worst 382 points in the 12-game season (31.8 points per game).

McLean was the top assistant on the coaching staff in 1957 and was given a one-year contract as head coach after Lisle Blackbourn was fired in early January 1958 with a year remaining ($25,000) on a five-year contract. Following the final game of the 1958 season, McLean resigned on December 17, which led to the historic hiring of Vince Lombardi in January 1959, who started turning things around in his first season.

The 1958 team consisted of hall of famers Bart Starr, Paul Hornung, Jim Taylor, Ray Nitschke, Jim Ringo, Bobby Dillon, Forrest Gregg, and Jerry Kramer, as well as future All-Pros Ron Kramer, Max McGee, Bill Forester, and Dan Currie. This is the only season that the team wore blue and white uniforms; the next year they would switch to the familiar green and gold color scheme which has remained ever since.

== Offseason ==
=== NFL draft ===
The first four rounds of the 1958 Draft were conducted in early December 1957, when Blackbourn was head coach. The remaining 26 rounds were selected in late January. This draft by the Packers is regarded as among the best in NFL history.

Round	Pick	Player	Position	School
1	3	Dan Currie	Linebacker	Michigan State
2	15	Jim Taylor	Fullback	LSU
3	27	Dick Christy	Back	North Carolina State
3	36	Ray Nitschke	Linebacker	Illinois
4	39	Jerry Kramer	Guard	Idaho
5	51	Joe Francis	Quarterback	Oregon State
6	62	Ken Gray	Tackle	Howard Payne
7	75	Doug Maison	Back	Hillsdale
8	86	Mike Bill	Center	Syracuse
9	99	Norm Jarock	Back	St. Norbert
10	110	Carl Johnson	Tackle	Illinois
11	123	Harry Horton	End	Wichita State
12	134	Wayne Miller	End	Baylor
13	147	Gene Cook	End	Toledo
13	153	Don Herndon	Back	Tampa
14	158	Harry Hauffe	Tackle	South Dakota
15	171	Tom Newell	Back	Drake
16	182	Arley Finley	Tackle	Georgia Tech
17	195	Joe Reese	End	Arkansas Tech
18	206	Chuck Strid	Guard	Syracuse
20	230	John DuBose	Back	Trinity (TX)
21	243	Jerry Kershner	Tackle	Oregon
22	264	Franklin Merlino	Back	Florida State
23	267	Jack Ashton	Guard	South Carolina
24	278	John Jereck	Tackle	Detroit
25	291	Larry Plenty	Back	Boston College
26	302	Esker Harris	Guard	UCLA
27	315	Neil Habig	Center	Purdue
28	326	Dave Crowell	Guard	Washington State
29	339	Bob Haynes	Tackle	Sam Houston State
30	350	John Peters	Tackle	Houston

- Yellow indicates a future Pro Bowl selection
- Green indicates a future Pro Football Hall of Fame inductee

== Regular season ==
=== Schedule ===
Game	Date	Opponent	Result	Record	Venue	Attendance	Recap	Sources
1	September 28	**Chicago Bears**	**L** 20–34	0–1–0	City Stadium	32,150	Recap	
2	October 5	**Detroit Lions**	**T** 13–13	0–1–1	City Stadium	32,053	Recap	
3	October 12	**Baltimore Colts**	**L** 17–24	0–2–1	Milwaukee County Stadium	24,553	Recap	
4	October 19	at Washington Redskins	**L** 21–37	0–3–1	Griffith Stadium	25,228	Recap	
5	October 26	Philadelphia Eagles	**W** 38–35	1–3–1	City Stadium	31,043	Recap	
6	November 2	at **Baltimore Colts**	**L** 0–56	1–4–1	Memorial Stadium	51,333	Recap	
7	November 9	at **Chicago Bears**	**L** 10–24	1–5–1	Wrigley Field	48,424	Recap	
8	November 16	**Los Angeles Rams**	**L** 7–20	1–6–1	City Stadium	28,051	Recap	
9	November 23	**San Francisco 49ers**	**L** 12–33	1–7–1	Milwaukee County Stadium	19,786	Recap	
10	November 27	at **Detroit Lions**	**L** 14–24	1–8–1	Briggs Stadium	50,971	Recap	
11	December 7	at **San Francisco 49ers**	**L** 21–48	1–9–1	Kezar Stadium	50,793	Recap	
12	December 14	at **Los Angeles Rams**	**L** 20–34	1–10–1	Los Angeles Memorial Coliseum	54,634	Recap	
Note: Intra-conference opponents are in **bold** text.

== Roster ==
1958 Green Bay Packers final roster
Quarterbacks: 20 Joe Francis; 10 Babe Parilli; 15 Bart Starr; Running backs: 48 Al Carmichael; 5 Paul Hornung K; 42 Don McIlhenny; 22 Jim Shanley; 31 Jim Taylor; Receivers: 86 Billy Howton; 40 Joe Johnson; 85 Max McGee P; 80 Steve Meilinger	Offensive linemen: 75 Forrest Gregg T; 64 Jerry Kramer G; 78 Norm Masters T; 51 Jim Ringo C; 67 Jim Salsbury G; 77 Ollie Spencer T; Defensive linemen: 87 Nate Borden DE; 83 Len Ford DE; 79 Dave Hanner DT; 72 J. D. Kimmel DT; 82 Jim Temp DE	Linebackers: 65 Tom Bettis MLB; 58 Dan Currie OLB; 69 Bill Forester OLB; 63 Marv Matuszak OLB; 33 Ray Nitschke MLB/OLB; Defensive backs: 44 Bobby Dillon S; 25 Billy Kinard CB; 23 Al Romine S; 27 John Symank S/CB; 47 Jesse Whittenton S/CB	Reserve list: 61 Hank Bullough G (Retired); 37 Howie Ferguson RB (IR); 46 Hank Gremminger CB (IR); -- Jerry Helluin DT (IR); 84 Gary Knafelc WR (IR); -- Ron Kramer WR (Military); -- Jack Losch RB (Military); 81 Carlton Massey LB (IR); -- Earl Miller WR (IR); -- Bob Skoronski T (Military); Rookies in italics

== Standings ==
Program for the November 16 visit of the Rams to Green Bay.

NFL Western Conference
	W	L	T	PCT	CONF	PF	PA	STK
Baltimore Colts	9	3	0	.750	8–2	381	203	L2
Los Angeles Rams	8	4	0	.667	7–3	344	278	W3
Chicago Bears	8	4	0	.667	7–3	298	230	W2
San Francisco 49ers	6	6	0	.500	4–6	257	324	W2
Detroit Lions	4	7	1	.364	3–6–1	261	276	L2
Green Bay Packers	1	10	1	.091	0–9–1	193	382	L7

Note: Tie games were not officially counted in the standings until 1972.

== Awards, records, and honors ==
=== Milestones ===
- Worst regular season record in franchise history
