= Ken MacAfee (end) =

American football player (1929–2007)

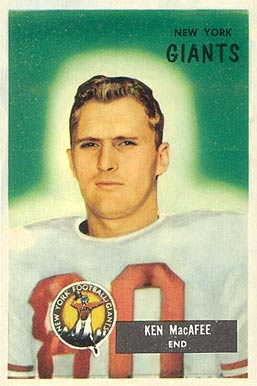
- MacAfee on a 1955 Bowman football card

No. 80, 82
- Position: End

Personal information
- Born: August 31, 1929; North Easton, Massachusetts, U.S.
- Died: July 4, 2007 (aged 77); Brockton, Massachusetts, U.S.
- Listed height: 6 ft 2 in (1.88 m)
- Listed weight: 212 lb (96 kg)

Career information
- High school: Oliver Ames (North Easton)
- College: Alabama (1950–1951)
- NFL draft: 1954: undrafted

Career history
- New York Giants (1954–1958); Philadelphia Eagles (1959); Washington Redskins (1959)

Awards and highlights
- NFL champion (1956)

Career NFL statistics
- Receptions: 79
- Receiving yards: 1,160
- Receiving touchdowns: 18
- Stats at Pro Football Reference

Kenneth Adams MacAfee Sr. (August 31, 1929 – July 4, 2007) was an American professional football end in the National Football League (NFL) for the New York Giants, the Philadelphia Eagles, and the Washington Redskins. He played college football at the University of Alabama. He is the father of College Football Hall of Fame tight end Ken MacAfee.

MacAfee died on July 4, 2007.

== See also ==
- Alabama Crimson Tide football yearly statistical leaders
