= 1958 Baltimore Colts season =

6th season in franchise history; first playoff appearance and NFL Championship win

- Owner: Carroll Rosenbloom
- General manager: Don "Red" Kellett
- Head coach: Weeb Ewbank
- Home stadium: Memorial Stadium

Results
- Record: 9–3
- Division place: 1st NFL Western
- Playoffs: Won NFL Championship (at Giants) 23–17 (OT)

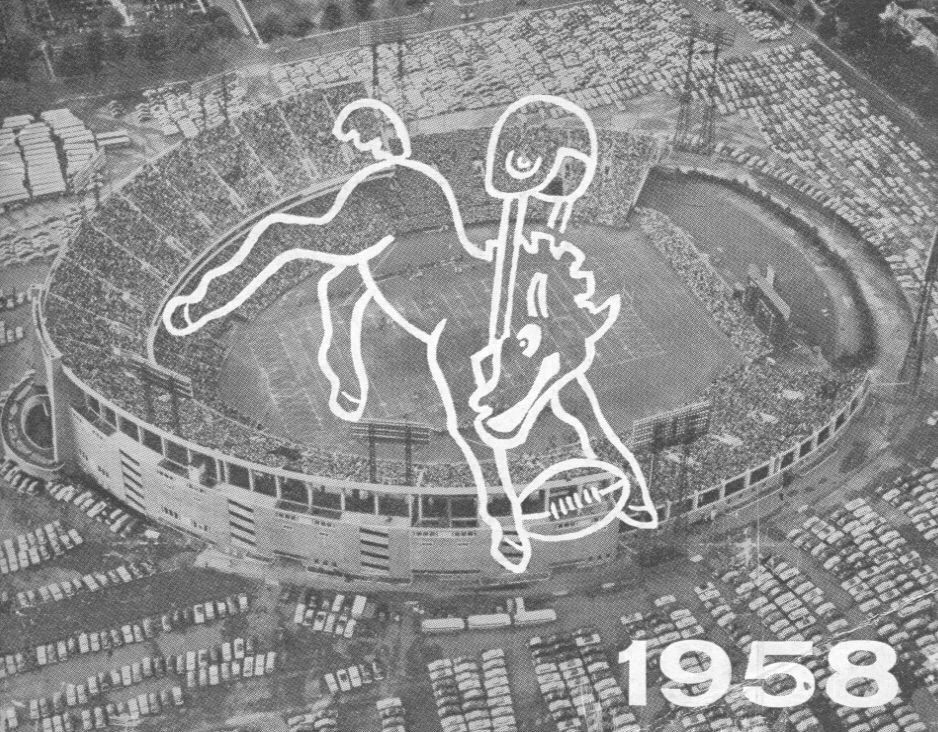
Baltimore Memorial Stadium 1958

The 1958 Baltimore Colts season was the sixth season for the team in the National Football League. The Colts finished the 1958 season with a record of 9 wins and 3 losses to win their first Western Conference title. They won their first league title in the NFL championship game, which ended in overtime with a touchdown by fullback Alan Ameche.

== Regular season ==
=== Schedule ===
Week	Date	Opponent	Result	Record	Venue	Attendance
1	September 28	**Detroit Lions**	**W** 28–15	1–0	Memorial Stadium	48,377
2	October 4	**Chicago Bears**	**W** 51–38	2–0	Memorial Stadium	52,622
3	October 12	at **Green Bay Packers**	**W** 24–17	3–0	Milwaukee County Stadium	24,533
4	October 19	at **Detroit Lions**	**W** 40–14	4–0	Briggs Stadium	55,190
5	October 26	Washington Redskins	**W** 35–10	5–0	Memorial Stadium	54,403
6	November 2	**Green Bay Packers**	**W** 56–0	6–0	Memorial Stadium	51,333
7	November 9	at New York Giants	**L** 21–24	6–1	Yankee Stadium	71,164
8	November 16	at **Chicago Bears**	**W** 17–0	7–1	Wrigley Field	48,664
9	November 23	**Los Angeles Rams**	**W** 34–7	8–1	Memorial Stadium	57,557
10	November 30	**San Francisco 49ers**	**W** 35–27	9–1	Memorial Stadium	57,557
11	December 6	at **Los Angeles Rams**	**L** 28–30	9–2	Los Angeles Memorial Coliseum	100,202
12	December 14	at **San Francisco 49ers**	**L** 12–21	9–3	Kezar Stadium	53,334
Note: Intra-conference opponents are in **bold** text.

=== Season summary ===
==== Week 1 ====
Team	1	2	3	4	Total
Lions	0	9	6	0	15
• Colts	7	7	0	14	28

- Date: September 28
- Location: Memorial Stadium, Baltimore, Maryland

Scoring summary
1	BAL	Lenny Moore 8 yard run (Steve Myhra kick)	Colts 7–0
2	DET	Jim Martin 31 yard field goal	Colts 7–3
2	DET	Howard Cassady 11 yard pass from Bobby Layne (kick failed)	Lions 9–7
2	BAL	Raymond Berry 26 yard pass from Johnny Unitas (Steve Myhra kick)	Colts 14–9
3	DET	Howard Cassady 30 yard pass from Tobin Rote (kick failed)	Lions 15–14
4	BAL	Raymond Berry 14 yard pass from Johnny Unitas (Steve Myhra kick)	Colts 21–15
4	BAL	L.G. Dupre 13 yard run (Steve Myhra kick)	Colts 28–15

==== Week 2 ====
Team	1	2	3	4	Total
Bears	3	7	21	7	38
• Colts	27	7	7	10	51

- Date: October 4
- Location: Memorial Stadium, Baltimore, Maryland

Scoring summary
1	BAL	Lenny Moore 28 yard run (Steve Myhra kick)	Colts 7–0
1	BAL	Raymond Berry 12 yard pass from Johnny Unitas (Steve Myhra kick)	Colts 14–0
1	BAL	Lenny Moore 9 yard run (kick failed)	Colts 20–0
1	CHI	George Blanda 40 yard field goal	Colts 20–3
1	BAL	Lenny Moore 77 yard pass from Johnny Unitas (Steve Myhra kick)	Colts 27–3
2	CHI	Bill McColl 11 yard pass from Ed Brown (George Blanda kick)	Colts 27–10
2	BAL	Lenny Lyles 103 yard kickoff return (Steve Myhra kick)	Colts 34–10
3	CHI	Johnny Morris 5 yard run (George Blanda kick)	Colts 34–17
3	CHI	Ed Brown 1 yard run (George Blanda kick)	Colts 34–24
3	BAL	Jim Mutscheller 2 yard pass from Johnny Unitas (Steve Myhra kick)	Colts 41–24
3	CHI	Willie Galimore 99 yard kickoff return (George Blanda kick)	Colts 41–31
4	BAL	Lenny Moore 33 yard pass from Johnny Unitas (Steve Myhra kick)	Colts 48–31
4	BAL	Steve Myhra 28 yard field goal	Colts 51–31
4	CHI	Bill McColl 20 yard pass from Zeke Bratkowski (George Blanda kick)	Colts 51–38

==== Week 3 ====
Team	1	2	3	4	Total
• **Colts**	0	7	7	10	24
Packers	14	3	0	0	17

- Date: October 12
- Location: Milwaukee County Stadium, Milwaukee, Wisconsin
- Game attendance: 24,553
- Source: Pro-Football-Reference.com

Scoring summary
1		Packers	Don McIlhenny 55-yard pass from Bart Star (Paul Hornung kick)	Packers 7–0
1		Packers	Bart Starr 1-yard run (Paul Hornung kick)	Packers 14–0
2	8:33	Packers	Paul Hornung 19-yard field goal	Packers 17–0
2		Colts	Johnny Unitas 1-yard run (Steve Myhra kick)	Packers 17–7
3		Colts	Jim Mutscheller 54-yard pass from Johnny Unitas (Steve Myhra kick)	Packers 17–14
4		Colts	Steve Myhra 14-yard field goal	Tie 17–17
4	2:12	Colts	Andy Nelson 52-yard interception return (Steve Myhra kick)	Colts 24–17

=== Standings ===
NFL Western Conference
	W	L	T	PCT	CONF	PF	PA	STK
Baltimore Colts	9	3	0	.750	8–2	381	203	L2
Los Angeles Rams	8	4	0	.667	7–3	344	278	W3
Chicago Bears	8	4	0	.667	7–3	298	230	W2
San Francisco 49ers	6	6	0	.500	4–6	257	324	W2
Detroit Lions	4	7	1	.364	3–6–1	261	276	L2
Green Bay Packers	1	10	1	.091	0–9–1	193	382	L7

Note: Tie games were not officially counted in the standings until 1972.

== Postseason ==
The 1958 NFL Championship Game was 26th annual NFL championship game, played on December 28 at Yankee Stadium in The Bronx, New York City. The Colts beat the Giants 23–17 in overtime, earning their first ever championship, and the game became known as The Greatest Game Ever Played.

Round	Date	Opponent	Result	Record	Venue	Attendance
NFL Championship	December 28	at New York Giants	W 23–17 (OT)	1–0	Yankee Stadium	64,185

== Roster ==
1958 Baltimore Colts roster
Quarterbacks: 14 George Shaw; 19 Johnny Unitas; Running backs: 35 Alan Ameche; 25 Jack Call; 45 L. G. Dupre; 26 Lenny Lyles; 24 Lenny Moore; 31 Billy Pricer; Receivers: 82 Raymond Berry; 84 Jim Mutscheller	Offensive linemen: 50 Buzz Nutter C; 77 Jim Parker T; 79 Sherman Plunkett T; 60 George Preas T; 68 Alex Sandusky G; 63 Art Spinney G; 64 Fuzzy Thurston G; Defensive linemen: 81 Ordell Braase DE; 70 Art Donovan DT; 83 Don Joyce DE; 78 Ray Krouse DT/DE; 76 Gene Lipscomb DT; 89 Gino Marchetti DE	Linebackers: 65 Steve Myhra OLB/K/G; 36 Bill Pellington OLB; 55 Leo Sanford OLB; 61 Don Shinnick MLB; Defensive backs: 17 Ray Brown S/P; 20 Milt Davis CB; 21 Art DeCarlo CB/WR; 80 Andy Nelson S; 44 Bert Rechichar CB/S/LB/WR/K; 47 Johnny Sample CB/S; 41 Jackie Simpson CB/S; 23 Carl Taseff CB	Reserve list: -- Ken Hall RB (IR); -- John Lewis WR (Military); 52 Dick Szymanski C/LB (IR); rookies in italics

== See also ==
- History of the Indianapolis Colts
- Indianapolis Colts seasons
- Colts-Patriots rivalry
