= 1958 Chicago Cardinals season =

American football team season

- Owner: Violet Bidwill Wolfner
- Head coach: Pop Ivy
- Home stadium: Comiskey Park

Results
- Record: 2–9–1
- Division place: 5th (tied) NFL Eastern
- Playoffs: Did not qualify

The 1958 NFL season was the 39th season of the Chicago Cardinals in the National Football League. The Cardinals failed to improve on their previous year's 3–9 record, winning only two games during the franchise's penultimate season in Chicago. They failed to qualify for the playoffs (NFL title game) for the tenth consecutive season.

== Draft picks ==
Player	Position	Round	Pick	College
King Hill	Quarterback	1	1	Rice
John David Crow	Halfback	1	2	Texas A&M
Jim McCusker	Tackle	2	14	Pittsburgh
Bobby Jack Oliver	Tackle	2	21	Baylor
Larry Cowart	Center	3	26	Baylor
Bobby Gordon	Back	6	63	Tennessee
Jon Jelacic	End	7	74	Minnesota
John Keelan	Tackle	9	98	Kansas State
Gil Robertshaw	Tackle	10	111	Brown
Dean Philpott	Back	11	122	Fresno State
Bill Hinton	Guard	12	135	Louisiana Tech
Charlie Jackson	Back	13	146	Southern Methodist
Bob Schmidt	Tackle	14	159	Minnesota
Ray Dunlap	Back	15	170	Marshall
Wade Patterson	End	16	183	Idaho
Mac Starnes	Center	17	194	Abilene Christian
Mario Cheppo	End	18	207	Louisville
Sonny Randle	Back	19	218	Virginia
Jim Matheny	Center	20	231	UCLA
Ray Toole	Back	21	242	North Texas State
Tony Aloisio	End	22	255	Indiana
John Harbour	Tackle	23	266	Southeast Missouri State
Eric Soesbe	Tackle	24	279	Vanderbilt
J.C. Riekenberg	Back	25	290	Northwestern State (LA)
Ray Masters	Back	26	303	Southern Methodist
Will Lewis	Back	27	314	Tennessee-Chattanooga
Gale McGinty	Back	28	327	West Texas State
Ken Irby	Tackle	29	338	Mississippi State

== Personnel ==
=== Staff / Coaches ===
1958 Chicago Cardinals staff
Front office: Principal Owner - Violet Bidwill Wolfner; Managing Director - Walter Wolfner; Head coaches: Head Coach – Pop Ivy; Assistant Head Coach - Chuck Drulis; Assistant Head Coach - Ray Prochaska; Assistant Head Coach - Abe Stuber; Offensive coaches: Offensive Line – Ray Prochaska	Defensive coaches: Defensive Assistant - Chuck Drulis

=== Roster ===
1958 Chicago Cardinals roster
Quarterbacks (QB): 16 King Hill; 8 Lamar McHan; 17 M. C. Reynolds; Running backs (RB): 35 Joe Childress; 44 John David Crow; 31 Mal Hammack; 33 Ollie Matson; 37 Dean Philpott; 21 Jim Sears S; 24 Bobby Watkins; Wide receivers (WR): 83 Max Boydston; 20 Woodley Lewis; 86 Gern Nagler; Tight ends (TE)	Offensive linemen (OL): 75 Ed Cook T; 71 Bobby Cross T; 50 Don Gillis C; 67 Bob Konovsky G; 70 Jim McCusker T; 62 Dale Meinert G; Defensive linemen (DL): 73 Ed Culpepper DT/MLB; 64 Ken Gray DE/G; 66 Ed Husmann DE/DT; 78 Luke Owens DT; 84 Leo Sugar DE; 72 Chuck Ulrich DT	Linebackers (LB): 57 Carl Brettschneider OLB; 51 Doug Eggers OLB; 61 Jack Patera MLB; 55 Jim Taylor OLB/C; 89 Chuck Weber MLB/DE; Defensive backs (DB): 40 Bobby Joe Conrad CB/K; 47 Bobby Gordon S/P; 22 Charlie Jackson S; 81 Night Train Lane CB/WR; 25 Dick Nolan S; Special teams (ST)	Reserve: John Dittrich G (Military); John Roach QB (Military); Rookies in italics

== Schedule ==
The September 28 game was played in Buffalo, New York because the Chicago White Sox were playing a home game at Comiskey Park on that day.

Week	Date	Opponent	Result	Record	Venue	Attendance
1	September 28	**New York Giants**	**L** 7–37	0–1	War Memorial Stadium^	21,923
2	October 4	**Washington Redskins**	**W** 37–10	1–1	Comiskey Park	21,824
3	October 12	at **Cleveland Browns**	**L** 28–35	1–2	Cleveland Stadium	65,403
4	October 19	at **New York Giants**	**W** 23–6	2–2	Yankee Stadium	52,684
5	October 26	**Cleveland Browns**	**L** 24–38	2–3	Comiskey Park	30,933
6	November 2	**Philadelphia Eagles**	**T** 21–21	2–3–1	Comiskey Park	17,486
7	November 9	at **Washington Redskins**	**L** 31–45	2–4–1	Griffith Stadium	26,196
8	November 16	at **Philadelphia Eagles**	**L** 21–49	2–5–1	Franklin Field	18,315
9	November 23	**Pittsburgh Steelers**	**L** 20–27	2–6–1	Comiskey Park	15,946
10	November 30	Los Angeles Rams	**L** 14–20	2–7–1	Comiskey Park	13,014
11	December 7	at Chicago Bears	**L** 14–30	2–8–1	Wrigley Field	41,617
12	December 13	at **Pittsburgh Steelers**	**L** 21–38	2–9–1	Forbes Field	16,660
Note: Intra-conference opponents are in **bold** text.

== Standings ==
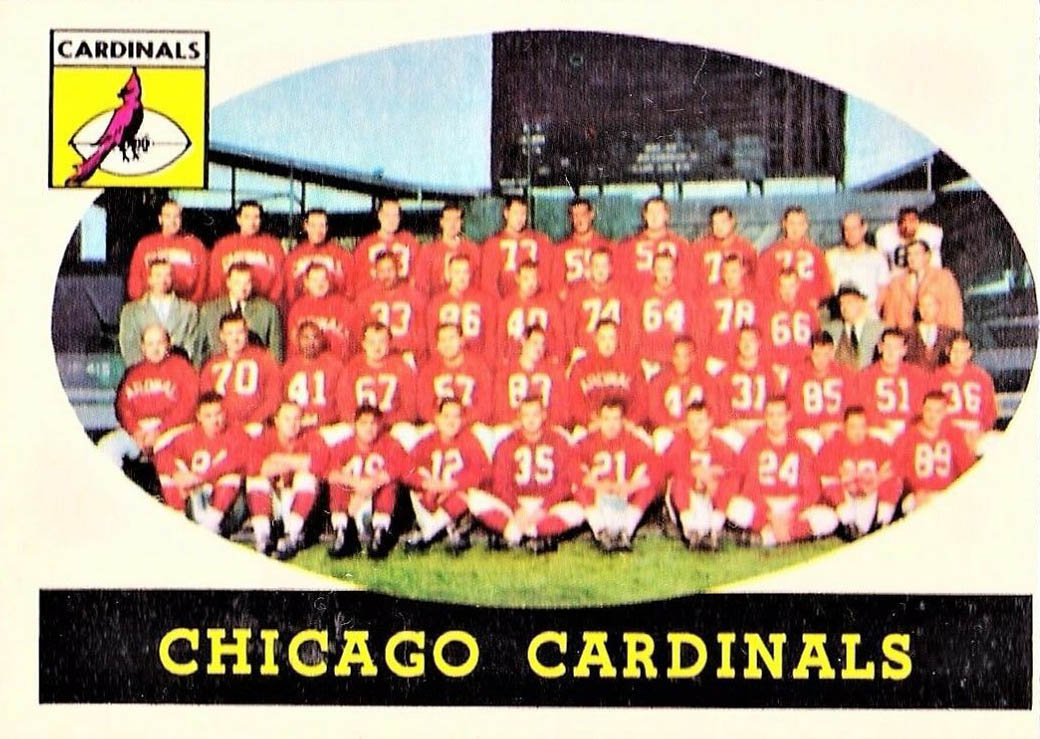
1958 Chicago Cardinals football card made by Topps. Note that the uniform color was significantly brighter than that worn by today's Cardinals team.

NFL Eastern Conference
	W	L	T	PCT	CONF	PF	PA	STK
New York Giants	9	3	0	.750	7–3	246	183	W4
Cleveland Browns	9	3	0	.750	8–2	302	217	L1
Pittsburgh Steelers	7	4	1	.636	6–3–1	261	230	W1
Washington Redskins	4	7	1	.364	3–6–1	214	268	W1
Chicago Cardinals	2	9	1	.182	2–7–1	261	356	L6
Philadelphia Eagles	2	9	1	.182	2–7–1	235	306	L4

Note: Tie games were not officially counted in the standings until 1972.
