= 1958 NFL season =

American football season

Regular season
- Duration: September 28 – December 14, 1958
- East Champions: New York Giants
- West Champions: Baltimore Colts

Championship Game
- Champions: Baltimore Colts

NFL teams: West, East

The 1958 NFL season was the 39th regular season of the National Football League.

The Baltimore Colts defeated the New York Giants, 23–17, in the first sudden-death overtime in an NFL Championship Game. The game became known to American football fans as "The Greatest Game Ever Played".

== Draft ==
The 1958 NFL draft was held on December 2, 1957, and January 28, 1958, at Philadelphia's Warwick Hotel. With the first pick, the Chicago Cardinals selected quarterback King Hill from Rice University.

== Regular season ==
=== Highlights ===
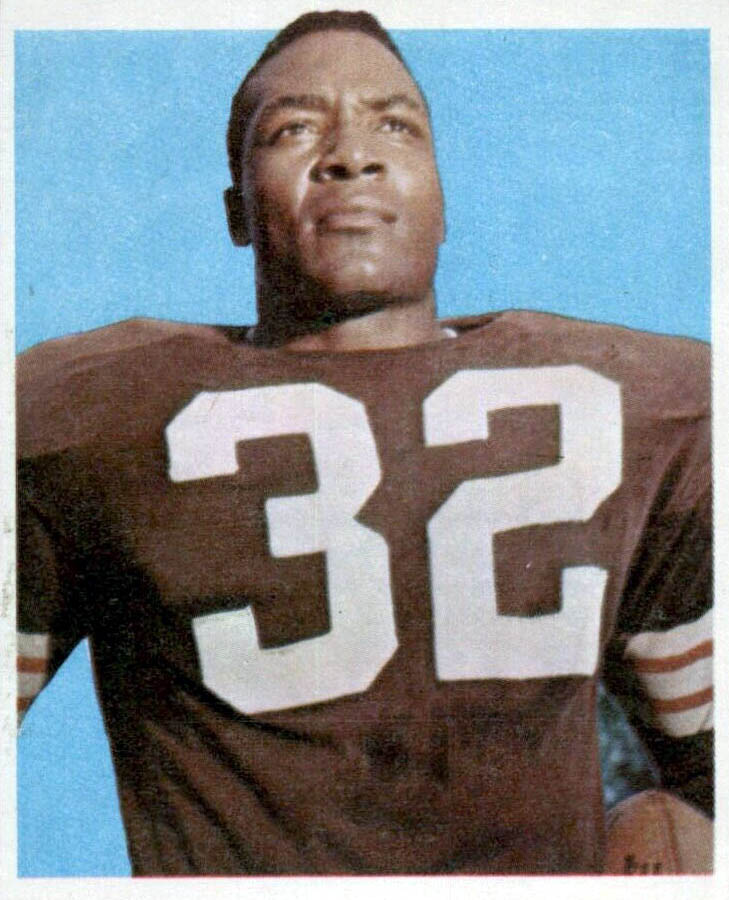
Cleveland running back Jim Brown set a league record with 1,527 yards gained and scored 17 touchdowns in a season culminating with a Most Valuable Player award.

The 1958 season is regarded as a watershed year in which the popularity of professional football in the United States began to rival that of baseball in the public imagination. "Professional football was beyond coming of age in 1958," one writer enthused, "it was on an even plane with baseball as the game of the people."

Stadium attendance was robust throughout the league, with crowds in excess of 100,000 twice filling the Los Angeles Coliseum to see the Los Angeles Rams, while the Detroit Lions managed to sell a staggering 42,000 season tickets in advance of the 1958 campaign, ensuring home sellouts at Briggs Stadium.

At the other end of the attendance spectrum, the Chicago Cardinals faltered with the live gate, overshadowed yet again by the legendary Bears. The team ultimately moved two of their home games for 1959 to Minneapolis before departing for St. Louis in 1960. Similarly, the Pittsburgh Steelers were disappointed with their attendance in their new home at Pitt Stadium, which proved difficult to access and provided a particularly windy and inhospitable place to watch a game. The team sought to remedy its problems by opting out of its two-year lease.

Cleveland Browns running back Jim Brown electrified football fans around the league by gaining more than 1,500 yards on 257 carries, an average of 5.9 yards per carry. The powerful Cleveland runner smashed the previous NFL record of 1,146 yards in a 12-game season, set by Steve Van Buren in 1949. He also nearly doubled the total of the second leading ground-gainer of 1958, fullback Alan Ameche of the Baltimore Colts. Brown's 17 touchdowns scored similarly dwarfed the tallies of any other player, with Colts end Raymond Berry second on the list with 9 scores.

Young wide receiver Del Shofner of the Los Angeles Rams led all receivers with 1,097 yards gained on 51 catches — a bountiful average of 21.5 yards per completion. Baltimore quarterback Johnny Unitas made use of a plethora of offensive weapons, connecting with halfback Lenny Moore for nearly 950 yards and wide out Ray Berry for nearly 800 more, leading the league with 2,875 yards passing. Unitas' interception percentage of 2.7% was also a league low among starting quarterbacks. San Francisco 49ers QB John Brodie led the league with a completion percentage of 59.9%.

On the defensive side of the ball, defensive back James Patton of the New York Giants lead the league with 11 interceptions in the 12-game season, followed by Pittsburgh Steelers defender Jack Butler with 9. Quarterback sacks were not an official statistic in this era, but the league-low 183 points allowed by the New York Giants (15.25 per game) give testimony to the stoutness of their defensive unit.

=== Divisional races ===
The 1958 Colts–Giants title game was a milestone in the popularity of pro football, but the Giants almost did not qualify. The Cleveland Browns led the Eastern Division title race up until the final week. On December 14, the 9–2 Browns visited the 8–3 Giants. As a snowstorm swept over Yankee Stadium, the Browns' 10–3 lead gave way to a 10–10 tie game on Frank Gifford's pass to Bob Schnelker, which would still have suited Cleveland. The Giants' Pat Summerall missed a 31-yard field goal with 4½ minutes left. With two minutes to play, Summerall had another opportunity from 49 yards out, in inclement weather and connected for a 13–10 win. The Browns and Giants finished with 9–3 records, and in the playoff the next week, the Giants won again at Yankee Stadium, 10–0.

The Western Division race was over after ten games, with the Colts at 9–1, and the Bears and Rams mathematically eliminated at 6–4. The Colts lost their final two games on the road in California to finish at 9–3, a game ahead of Chicago and Los Angeles.

The Green Bay Packers finished with a league-worst record of 1–10–1 and hired Vince Lombardi, offensive coach of the Giants, as head coach in January 1959. Philadelphia finished tied for worst in the East, at 2–9–1. Two years later, both the Eagles and Packers would play for the championship.

== Final standings ==
NFL Eastern Conference
	W	L	T	PCT	CONF	PF	PA	STK
New York Giants	9	3	0	.750	7–3	246	183	W4
Cleveland Browns	9	3	0	.750	8–2	302	217	L1
Pittsburgh Steelers	7	4	1	.636	6–3–1	261	230	W1
Washington Redskins	4	7	1	.364	3–6–1	214	268	W1
Chicago Cardinals	2	9	1	.182	2–7–1	261	356	L6
Philadelphia Eagles	2	9	1	.182	2–7–1	235	306	L4

Note: Tie games were not officially counted in the standings until 1972.

NFL Western Conference
	W	L	T	PCT	CONF	PF	PA	STK
Baltimore Colts	9	3	0	.750	8–2	381	203	L2
Los Angeles Rams	8	4	0	.667	7–3	344	278	W3
Chicago Bears	8	4	0	.667	7–3	298	230	W2
San Francisco 49ers	6	6	0	.500	4–6	257	324	W2
Detroit Lions	4	7	1	.364	3–6–1	261	276	L2
Green Bay Packers	1	10	1	.091	0–9–1	193	382	L7

== Playoffs ==
1958 NFL playoffs

Home team in capitals

Eastern Conference Playoff Game

- NEW YORK 10, Cleveland 0

NFL Championship Game

- Baltimore 23, NEW YORK 17 (OT)

== Awards ==
Most Valuable Player	Jim Brown, Fullback, Cleveland
Coach of the Year	Weeb Ewbank, Baltimore Colts

== Coaching changes ==
- Chicago Bears: Paddy Driscoll moved to the team's front office, while George Halas returned as head coach after a two-year break.
- Chicago Cardinals: Ray Richards was replaced by Pop Ivy.
- Green Bay Packers: Lisle Blackbourn was replaced by Ray McLean.
- Philadelphia Eagles: Hugh Devore was replaced by Buck Shaw.

== Stadium changes ==
- The Pittsburgh Steelers started to split their games between their original home Forbes Field and Pitt Stadium
- The Philadelphia Eagles moved from Connie Mack Stadium to Franklin Field
