= 1960 Philadelphia Eagles season =

NFL team season

- Owner: Happy Hundred
- General manager: Vince McNally
- Head coach: Buck Shaw
- Home stadium: Franklin Field

Results
- Record: 10–2
- Division place: 1st NFL Eastern
- Playoffs: Won NFL Championship (vs. Packers) 17–13
- Pro Bowlers: RLB/MLB Maxie Baughan; RE Bobby Walston; LE Pete Retzlaff; DE Marion Campbell; RHB Tommy McDonald; C Chuck Bednarik; CB Tom Brookshier; QB Norm Van Brocklin

The 1960 Philadelphia Eagles season was the franchise's 28th season in the National Football League, and finished with the Eagles' win over the Green Bay Packers in the NFL championship game to get their third league title. The victory over the Packers was also the first and only playoff defeat of the Packers' Vince Lombardi's coaching career. The 1960 season was the Eagles' first postseason appearance since their last NFL championship season of 1949. It was their only postseason appearance in the 28 seasons from 1950 to 1977, and their last NFL title until their victory in Super Bowl LII, 57 years later.

== Off season ==
On March 13, 1960, there was an expansion draft to stock the Dallas Rangers, who soon changed their name to the "Cowboys." In this draft the Eagles lost tight end Dick Bielski, tackle Jerry DeLucca, and linebacker Bill Striegel to Dallas.

As since 1951, the Eagles held training camp at Hersheypark Stadium in Hershey, Pennsylvania.

=== NFL draft ===
The 1960 NFL draft and the 1960 AFL draft were held separately for college players (the common draft was initiated in 1967).

The NFL draft was a draft of 20 rounds with 12 teams picking. The Eagles rotated having the 7th, 8th or 9th pick in the draft rounds, with Chicago and Cleveland. The quickly assembled NFL franchise of the Dallas Cowboys did not have a chance to pick, as the draft was held on November 30, 1959, before they were formed on January 28, 1960.

The AFL draft was a list made the teams of territorial players they claimed first. Then a draft was held by drafting players by position instead of any available player. When Minneapolis left the league other AFL teams pursued those picks. Oakland got the rights after they joined the league.

The Philadelphia Eagles lost four players to the AFL including 1st round pick Ron Burton, a running back from Northwestern University. A total of six NFL 1st round picks in this draft signed with the AFL this year.

=== Player selections ===
The table shows the Eagles selections and what picks they had that were traded away and the team that ended up with that pick. It is possible the Eagles' pick ended up with this team via another team that the Eagles made a trade with. Not shown are acquired picks that the Eagles traded away.

= Pro Bowler	= AFL All-Star	= Hall of Famer

Round	Pick	Player	Position	School	AFL	Round	Signed
1	9	Ron Burton	Halfback	Northwestern	Boston Patriots	1	Boston
2	20	Maxie Baughan	Linebacker	Georgia Tech	Minneapolis	1	Eagles
3	31	Curt Merz	End	Iowa	New York Titans	1	Dallas Texans
4	40	Ted Dean _{Pick from Washington Redskins}	Halfback	Wichita State	Buffalo Bills	1	Eagles
4	45	Jack Cummings	Quarterback	North Carolina	Boston Patriots	1	
5	56	Don Norton	End	Iowa	Dallas Texans	1	Los Angeles Chargers
6	67	Emmett Wilson	Tackle	Georgia Tech	Buffalo Bills	2	
7	81	John Wilkins	Tackle	USC	Denver Broncos	2	Eagles
8	92	Monte Lee	End	Texas			
9	103	_{Pick Taken by Baltimore Colts}					
10	117	_{Pick Taken by Detroit Lions}					
11	129	_{Pick Taken by Chicago Bears}					
12	139	Dave Grosz	Quarterback	Oregon	Minneapolis	1	
13	153	Dave Graham	End	Virginia	Houston Oilers	2	Eagles
14	164	Ray Petersen	Back	West Virginia	Buffalo	1	
15	175	John Wilcox	Tackle	Oregon	Minneapolis	1	Eagles
16	189	Larry Lancaster	Tackle	Georgia	Los Angeles Chargers	2	
17	200	Mike Graney	End	Notre Dame	Buffalo Bills	2	
18	211	Emory Turner	Guard	Purdue	Dallas	1	
19	225	Bob Hain	Tackle	Iowa	Los Angeles Chargers	2	
20	236	Ramon Armstrong	Guard	Texas Christian	New York Titans	2	Oakland Raiders

== Personnel ==
1960 Philadelphia Eagles roster
Quarterbacks (QB): 9 Sonny Jurgensen; 11 Norm Van Brocklin P; Running backs (RB): 33 Billy Ray Barnes; 22 Timmy Brown; 35 Ted Dean; 26 Clarence Peaks; 30 Theron Sapp; Wide receivers (WR): 25 Tommy McDonald; 44 Pete Retzlaff; Tight ends (TE): 87 Dick Lucas; 17 Jerry Reichow; 83 Bobby Walston K	Offensive linemen (OL): 60 Chuck Bednarik C/OLB; 67 Stan Campbell G; 65 Gerry Huth G; 61 Howard Keys T; 54 Bill Lapham C; 75 Jim McCusker T; 76 J. D. Smith T; 71 John Wilcox T; 62 John Wittenborn G; Defensive linemen (DL): 78 Marion Campbell DE; 79 Gene Gossage DE; 71 Riley Gunnels DT; 73 Ed Khayat DT; 72 Jess Richardson DT; 66 Joe Robb DE/OLB	Linebackers (LB): 55 Maxie Baughan OLB; 29 John Nocera OLB; 53 Bob Pellegrini OLB/G; 51 Chuck Weber MLB; Defensive backs (DB): 40 Tom Brookshier CB; 45 Don Burroughs FS; 21 Jimmy Carr CB; 41 Bobby Freeman CB/SS; 28 Bobby Jackson SS/FS; 27 Gene Johnson SS; Special teams (ST)	Practice squad Head coach: Buck Shaw; Assistant coaches: Charley Gauer; Jerry Williams; Nick Skorich; Rookies in italics

== Preseason ==
Week	Date	Opponent	Result	Record	Venue	Attendance
1	August 13	at Los Angeles Rams	W 20–7	1–0	Los Angeles Memorial Coliseum	39,480
2	August 21	at San Francisco 49ers	L 28–45	1–1	Kezar Stadium	17,677
3	August 27	at Washington Redskins	W 24–6	2–1	Foreman Field	20,132
4	September 3	vs. Detroit Lions	W 40–10	3–1	Oklahoma Memorial Stadium	32,500
5	September 9	at St. Louis Cardinals	L 13–34	3–2	Busch Stadium	23,666
6	September 17	Baltimore Colts	W 35–21	4–2	Hershey Stadium	20,125

=== Game summaries ===
==== Week P1 (Saturday, August 13, 1960): at Los Angeles Rams ====
Preseason Week 1: Philadelphia Eagles 20 at Los Angeles Rams 7 – Game summary

Quarter	1	2	3	4	Total
Eagles (1–0)	0	0	10	10	20
Rams (0–1)	0	7	0	0	7

at Los Angeles Memorial Coliseum • Los Angeles, California

- Date: August 13, 1960
- Game time: 11:15 p.m. EDT
- Game attendance: 39,480
- Referee: Bud Brubaker

Team	Category	Player	Statistics
PHI	Passing		
PHI	Rushing		
PHI	Receiving		
LA	Passing		
LA	Rushing		
LA	Receiving		

Scoring summary

Quarter	Time	Drive			Team	Scoring information	Score	
Quarter	Time	Plays	Yards	TOP	Team	Scoring information	PHI	LA
"TOP" = time of possession. For other American football terms, see Glossary of American football.							20	7

- Point spread:
- Over/under:
- Time of game:

Eagles	Game statistics	Rams
	First downs	
	Rushes–yards	
	Passing yards	
	Passes	
	Sacked–yards	
	Net passing yards	
	Total yards	
	Return yards	
	Punts	
	Fumbles–lost	
	Penalties–yards	
	Time of possession	

==== Week P2 (Sunday, August 21, 1960): at San Francisco 49ers ====
Preseason Week 2: Philadelphia Eagles 28 at San Francisco 49ers 45 – Game summary

Quarter	1	2	3	4	Total
Eagles (1–1)	0	7	14	7	28
49ers (2–0–1)	14	10	0	21	45

at Kezar Stadium • San Francisco, California

- Date: August 21, 1960
- Game time: 4:30 p.m. EDT
- Game attendance: 17,677

Team	Category	Player	Statistics
PHI	Passing		
PHI	Rushing		
PHI	Receiving		
SF	Passing		
SF	Rushing		
SF	Receiving		

Scoring summary

Quarter	Time	Drive			Team	Scoring information	Score	
Quarter	Time	Plays	Yards	TOP	Team	Scoring information	PHI	SF
"TOP" = time of possession. For other American football terms, see Glossary of American football.							28	45

- Point spread:
- Over/under:
- Time of game:

Eagles	Game statistics	49ers
	First downs	
	Rushes–yards	
	Passing yards	
	Passes	
	Sacked–yards	
	Net passing yards	
	Total yards	
	Return yards	
	Punts	
	Fumbles–lost	
	Penalties–yards	
	Time of possession	

==== Week P3 (Sunday, August 27, 1960): at Washington Redskins ====
Preseason Week 3: Philadelphia Eagles 24 at Washington Redskins 6 – Game summary

Quarter	1	2	3	4	Total
Eagles (2–1)	0	7	0	17	24
Redskins (0–3)	3	3	0	0	6

at Foreman Field • Norfolk, Virginia

- Date: August 27, 1960
- Game time: 9:05 p.m. EDT
- Game attendance: 20,132

Team	Category	Player	Statistics
PHI	Passing		
PHI	Rushing		
PHI	Receiving		
WAS	Passing		
WAS	Rushing		
WAS	Receiving		

Scoring summary

Quarter	Time	Drive			Team	Scoring information	Score	
Quarter	Time	Plays	Yards	TOP	Team	Scoring information	PHI	WAS
"TOP" = time of possession. For other American football terms, see Glossary of American football.							24	6

- Point spread:
- Over/under:
- Time of game:

Eagles	Game statistics	Redskins
	First downs	
	Rushes–yards	
	Passing yards	
	Passes	
	Sacked–yards	
	Net passing yards	
	Total yards	
	Return yards	
	Punts	
	Fumbles–lost	
	Penalties–yards	
	Time of possession	

==== Week P4 (Saturday, September 3, 1960): vs. Detroit Lions ====
Preseason Week 4: Detroit Lions 10 at Philadelphia Eagles 40 – Game summary

Quarter	1	2	3	4	Total
Lions (2–2)	7	3	0	0	10
Eagles (3–1)	17	7	9	7	40

at Oklahoma Memorial Stadium • Norman, Oklahoma

- Date: September 3, 1960
- Game time: 9:00 p.m. EDT
- Game attendance: 32,500

Team	Category	Player	Statistics
DET	Passing		
DET	Rushing		
DET	Receiving		
PHI	Passing		
PHI	Rushing		
PHI	Receiving		

Scoring summary

Quarter	Time	Drive			Team	Scoring information	Score	
Quarter	Time	Plays	Yards	TOP	Team	Scoring information	DET	PHI
"TOP" = time of possession. For other American football terms, see Glossary of American football.							10	40

- Point spread:
- Over/under:
- Time of game:

Lions	Game statistics	Eagles
	First downs	
	Rushes–yards	
	Passing yards	
	Passes	
	Sacked–yards	
	Net passing yards	
	Total yards	
	Return yards	
	Punts	
	Fumbles–lost	
	Penalties–yards	
	Time of possession	

==== Week P5 (Friday, September 9, 1960): at St. Louis Cardinals ====
Preseason Week 5: Philadelphia Eagles 13 at St. Louis Cardinals 34 – Game summary

Quarter	1	2	3	4	Total
Eagles (3–2)	6	0	0	7	13
Cardinals (3–2)	0	14	7	13	34

at Busch Stadium • St. Louis, Missouri

- Date: September 9, 1960
- Game time: 9:30 p.m. EDT
- Game attendance: 21,358

Team	Category	Player	Statistics
PHI	Passing		
PHI	Rushing		
PHI	Receiving		
STL	Passing		
STL	Rushing		
STL	Receiving		

Scoring summary

Quarter	Time	Drive			Team	Scoring information	Score	
Quarter	Time	Plays	Yards	TOP	Team	Scoring information	PHI	STL
"TOP" = time of possession. For other American football terms, see Glossary of American football.							13	34

- Point spread:
- Over/under:
- Time of game:

Eagles	Game statistics	Cardinals
	First downs	
	Rushes–yards	
	Passing yards	
	Passes	
	Sacked–yards	
	Net passing yards	
	Total yards	
	Return yards	
	Punts	
	Fumbles–lost	
	Penalties–yards	
	Time of possession	

==== Week P6 (Saturday, September 17, 1960): vs. Baltimore Colts ====
Preseason Week 6: Baltimore Colts 21 at Philadelphia Eagles 35 – Game summary

Quarter	1	2	3	4	Total
Colts (3–3)	7	7	7	0	21
Eagles (4–2)	0	28	0	7	35

at Hershey Stadium • Hershey, Pennsylvania

- Date: September 17, 1960
- Game time: 8:05 p.m. EDT
- Game attendance: 20,125

Team	Category	Player	Statistics
BAL	Passing		
BAL	Rushing		
BAL	Receiving		
PHI	Passing		
PHI	Rushing		
PHI	Receiving		

Scoring summary

Quarter	Time	Drive			Team	Scoring information	Score	
Quarter	Time	Plays	Yards	TOP	Team	Scoring information	BAL	PHI
"TOP" = time of possession. For other American football terms, see Glossary of American football.							21	35

- Point spread:
- Over/under:
- Time of game:

Colts	Game statistics	Eagles
	First downs	
	Rushes–yards	
	Passing yards	
	Passes	
	Sacked–yards	
	Net passing yards	
	Total yards	
	Return yards	
	Punts	
	Fumbles–lost	
	Penalties–yards	
	Time of possession	

== Regular season ==
During the 1960 season, Chuck Bednarik is perhaps best known for knocking Frank Gifford of the New York Giants out of football for over eighteen months, considered one of the most famous tackles in NFL history. It occurred late in the game at Yankee Stadium on November 20.

Bednarik was the last player to play the whole game. He averaged 58 minutes a game, starting at center and linebacker in the second half of season.

=== Schedule ===
A bye week was necessary in 1960, as the league expanded to an odd-number (13) of teams (Dallas); one team was idle each week.

Game	Date	Opponent	Result	Record	Venue	Attendance	Recap	Sources
1	September 25	**Cleveland Browns**	**L** 24–41	0–1	Franklin Field	56,303	Recap	
2	September 30	at Dallas Cowboys	**W** 27–25	1–1	Cotton Bowl	18,500	Recap	
3	October 9	**St. Louis Cardinals**	**W** 31–27	2–1	Franklin Field	33,701	Recap	
4	October 16	Detroit Lions	**W** 28–10	3–1	Franklin Field	38,065	Recap	
5	October 23	at **Cleveland Browns**	**W** 31–29	4–1	Cleveland Stadium	64,850	Recap	
6	Bye							
7	November 6	**Pittsburgh Steelers**	**W** 34–7	5–1	Franklin Field	58,324	Recap	
8	November 13	**Washington Redskins**	**W** 19–13	6–1	Franklin Field	39,361	Recap	
9	November 20	at **New York Giants**	**W** 17–10	7–1	Yankee Stadium	63,571	Recap	
10	November 27	**New York Giants**	**W** 31–23	8–1	Franklin Field	60,547	Recap	
11	December 4	at **St. Louis Cardinals**	**W** 20–6	9–1	Busch Stadium	21,358	Recap	
12	December 11	at **Pittsburgh Steelers**	**L** 21–27	9–2	Forbes Field	22,101	Recap	
13	December 18	at **Washington Redskins**	**W** 38–28	10–2	Griffith Stadium	20,558	Recap	
Note: Intra-conference opponents are in **bold** text. Friday night: September 30.

=== Game summaries ===
==== Week 1 (Sunday, September 25, 1960): vs. Cleveland Browns ====
Week 1: Cleveland Browns 41 at Philadelphia Eagles 24 – Game summary

Quarter	1	2	3	4	Total
**Browns** (1–0)	14	10	7	10	**41**
Eagles (0–1)	3	7	0	14	**24**

at Franklin Field • Philadelphia, Pennsylvania

- Date: September 25, 1960
- Game time: 1:30 p.m. EDT
- Game weather: Temperature: 61 °F (16 °C) • **Relative Humidity** 77% • Wind: 9 mph (14 km/h)
- Game attendance: 56,303
- Referee: Ron Gibbs
- TV announcers (SNI): Ken Coleman (play-by-play) and Jimmy Dudley (analyst)

Team	Category	Player	Statistics
CLE	Passing	Milt Plum	9/11, 67 YDS, 1 TD
CLE	Rushing	Bobby Mitchell	14 CAR, 156 YDS, 2 TDs
CLE	Receiving	Bobby Mitchell	5 REC, 34 YDS, 1 TD
PHI	Passing	Norm Van Brocklin	16/30, 251 YDS, 2 TDs, 3 INTs
PHI	Rushing	Billy Ray Barnes	10 CAR, 56 YDS
PHI	Receiving	Pete Retzlaff; Tommy McDonald	5 REC, 80 YDS, 1 TD; 5 REC, 67 YDS, 1 TD

Scoring summary

Quarter	Time	Drive			Team	Scoring information	Score	
Quarter	Time	Plays	Yards	TOP	Team	Scoring information	CLE	PHI
1	13:24	1	31		Browns	Mitchell 31-yard touchdown run, Baker kick good	7	0
1	5:41	2	8		Browns	Brown 1-yard touchdown run, Baker kick good	14	0
1	0:16				Eagles	21-yard field goal by Walston	14	3
2	13:03				Browns	36-yard field goal by Baker	17	3
2	10:08	5	74		Eagles	McDonald 24-yard touchdown reception from Van Brocklin, Walston kick good	17	10
2	2:52	12	69		Browns	Plum 31-yard touchdown run, Baker kick good	24	10
3	7:19	3	70		Browns	Mitchell 30-yard touchdown run, Baker kick good	31	10
4	10:48				Browns	15-yard field goal by Baker	34	10
4	8:24	2	57		Eagles	Walston 10-yard touchdown reception from Van Brocklin, Walston kick good	34	17
4	1:55	12	61		Browns	Mitchell 11-yard touchdown reception from Plum, Baker kick good	41	17
4	0:24	8	75		Eagles	Retzlaff 6-yard touchdown reception from Jurgensen, Walston kick good	41	24
"TOP" = time of possession. For other American football terms, see Glossary of American football.							41	24

- Point spread: Eagles Pick'em
- Over/under:
- Time of game:

Browns	Game statistics	Eagles
21	First downs	24
44–329	Rushes–yards	33–106
67	Passing yards	308
9–11–0	Passes	21–36–3
0	Sacked–yards	8
67	Net passing yards	300
396	Total yards	406
129	Return yards	141
2–34.0	Punts	0–0.0
0–0	Fumbles–lost	3–1
5–65	Penalties–yards	3–24
	Time of possession	

Individual stats

- Passing: Van Brocklin – 16/30, 251 YDS, 2 TDs, 3 INTs; Jurgensen – 5/6, 57 YDS, 1 TD
- Rushing: Barnes – 10 CAR, 56 YDS; Dean – 11 CAR, 30 YDS; Peaks – 10 CAR, 20 YDS; Van Brocklin – 1 CAR, 0 YDS
- Receiving: Retzlaff – 5 REC, 80 YDS, 1 TD; McDonald – 5 REC, 67 YDS, 1 TD; Walston – 4 REC, 75 YDS, 1 TD; Peaks – 4 REC, 35 YDS; Barnes – 2 REC, 20 YDS; Dean – 1 REC, 31 YDS
- Kickoff returns: Dean – 3 KR, 55 YDS; Brown – 2 KR, 47 YDS; Robb – 2 KR, 22 YDS; Reichow – 1 KR, 0 YDS
- Punt returns: Brown – 1 PR, 10 YDS
- Kicking: Walston – 3/3 PAT, 1/2 FG
- Eagles Missed Field Goals: Walston 39

Officials

- Referee: (#5) Ron Gibbs
- Umpire: (#18) Tony Sacco
- Head linesman: (#26) Ed Marion
- Back judge: (#10) Sam Giangreco
- Field judge: (#16) Mike Lisetski

==== Week 2: (Friday, September 30, 1960): at Dallas Cowboys ====
Week 2: Philadelphia Eagles 27 at Dallas Cowboys 25 – Game summary

Quarter	1	2	3	4	Total
**Eagles** (1–1)	3	10	0	14	**27**
Cowboys (0–2)	3	3	6	13	**25**

at Cotton Bowl • Dallas, Texas

- Date: September 30, 1960
- Game time: 10:00 p.m. EDT
- Game weather: Temperature: 77 °F (25 °C) • **Relative Humidity** 50% • Wind: 11 mph (18 km/h)
- Game attendance: 18,500

Team	Category	Player	Statistics
PHI	Passing		
PHI	Rushing		
PHI	Receiving		
DAL	Passing		
DAL	Rushing		
DAL	Receiving		

Scoring summary

Quarter	Time	Drive			Team	Scoring information	Score	
Quarter	Time	Plays	Yards	TOP	Team	Scoring information	PHI	DAL
"TOP" = time of possession. For other American football terms, see Glossary of American football.							27	25

- Point spread: Eagles –6½
- Over/under:
- Time of game:

Eagles	Game statistics	Cowboys
	First downs	
	Rushes–yards	
	Passing yards	
	Passes	
	Sacked–yards	
	Net passing yards	
	Total yards	
	Return yards	
	Punts	
	Fumbles–lost	
	Penalties–yards	
	Time of possession	

==== Week 3 (Sunday, October 9, 1960): vs. St. Louis Cardinals ====
Week 3: St. Louis Cardinals 27 at Philadelphia Eagles 31 – Game summary

Quarter	1	2	3	4	Total
Cardinals (1–2)	7	7	3	10	**27**
**Eagles** (2–1)	7	14	0	10	**31**

at Franklin Field • Philadelphia, Pennsylvania

- Date: October 9, 1960
- Game time: 1:30 p.m. EDT
- Game weather: Temperature: 57 °F (14 °C) • **Relative Humidity** 65% • Wind: 5 mph (8 km/h)
- Game attendance: 33,701
- Referee: Emil Heintz
- TV announcers (CBS): Jack Drees (play-by-play) and Terry Brennan (analyst)

Team	Category	Player	Statistics
STL	Passing	John Roach	9/25, 133 YDS, 4 INTs
STL	Rushing	John David Crow	16 CAR, 143 YDS, 1 TD
STL	Receiving	John David Crow; Hugh McInnis	3 REC, 65 YDS; 3 REC, 31 YDS
PHI	Passing	Norm Van Brocklin	17/23, 199 YDS, 3 TDs, 1 INT
PHI	Rushing	Clarence Peaks	11 CAR, 73 YDS, 1 TD
PHI	Receiving	Pete Retzlaff	7 REC, 132 YDS, 2 TDs

Scoring summary

Quarter	Time	Drive			Team	Scoring information	Score	
Quarter	Time	Plays	Yards	TOP	Team	Scoring information	STL	PHI
1	10:42	6	62		Cardinals	Hammack 3-yard touchdown run, Conrad kick good	7	0
1	1:08	1	21		Eagles	Retzlaff 21-yard touchdown reception from Van Brocklin, Walston kick good	7	7
2	11:43	3	40		Cardinals	Childress 23-yard touchdown reception from Crow, Conrad kick good	14	7
2	7:01	5	62		Eagles	Retzlaff 13-yard touchdown reception from Van Brocklin, Walston kick good	14	14
3	1:12				Cardinals	18-yard field goal by Perry	17	21
4	14:55				Eagles	27-yard field goal by Walston	17	24
4	13:15	3	59		Cardinals	Crow 46-yard touchdown run, Conrad kick good	24	24
4	9:08				Cardinals	12-yard field goal by Perry	27	24
4	6:27	9	72		Eagles	McDonald 11-yard touchdown reception from Van Brocklin, Walston kick good	27	31
"TOP" = time of possession. For other American football terms, see Glossary of American football.							27	31

- Point spread: Eagles –6½
- Over/under:
- Time of game:

Cardinals	Game statistics	Eagles
20	First downs	14
41–219	Rushes–yards	26–94
156	Passing yards	199
10–27–4	Passes	17–23–1
11	Sacked–yards	0
145	Net passing yards	199
364	Total yards	293
144	Return yards	241
2–54.0	Punts	3–46.7
2–2	Fumbles–lost	3–2
1–5	Penalties–yards	2–15
	Time of possession	

Individual stats

- Passing: Van Brocklin – 17/23, 199 YDS, 3 TDs, 1 INT
- Rushing: Peaks – 11 CAR, 73 YDS, 1 TD; Dean – 11 CAR, 24 YDS; Barnes – 2 CAR, –1 YD; Van Brocklin – 2 CAR, –2 YDS
- Receiving: Retzlaff – 7 REC, 132 YDS, 2 TDs; McDonald – 3 REC, 37 YDS, 1 TD; Dean – 3 REC, 8 YDS; Barnes – 2 REC, 3 YDS; Peaks – 1 REC, 10 YDS; Walston – 1 REC, 9 YDS
- Kickoff returns: Dean – 4 KR, 94 YDS; Brown – 2 KR, 84 YDS
- Punt returns: Dean – 1 PR, 7 YDS
- Punting: Van Brocklin – 3 PUNTS, 140 YDS
- Kicking: Walston – 4/4 PAT, 1/3 FG
- Interceptions: Burroughs – 2 INTs, 38 YDS; Brookshier – 1 INT, 14 YDS; Weber – 1 INT, 4 YDS
- Eagles Missed Field Goals: Walston 28, 33

Officials

- Referee: (#9) Emil Heintz
- Umpire: (#43) Jim Muha
- Head linesman: (#31) Charlie Berry
- Back judge: (#34) John Vaughn
- Field judge: (#41) Jack Nix

==== Week 4 (Sunday, October 16, 1960): vs. Detroit Lions ====
Week 4: Detroit Lions 10 at Philadelphia Eagles 28 – Game summary

Quarter	1	2	3	4	Total
Lions (0–3)	0	3	7	0	**10**
**Eagles** (3–1)	7	7	0	14	**28**

at Franklin Field • Philadelphia, Pennsylvania

- Date: October 16, 1960
- Game time: 1:30 p.m. EDT
- Game weather: Temperature: 66 °F (19 °C) • **Relative Humidity** 88% • Wind: 7 mph (11 km/h)
- Game attendance: 38,065
- Referee: Bill Downes
- TV announcers (CBS): Van Patrick and Bob Reynolds (play-by-play)

Team	Category	Player	Statistics
DET	Passing	Jim Ninowski	7/22, 99 YDS, 3 INTs
DET	Rushing	Ken Webb	10 CAR, 48 YDS
DET	Receiving	Gail Cogdill; Jim Gibbons; Nick Pietrosante	3 REC, 38 YDS; 3 REC, 37 YDS; 3 REC, 36 YDS
PHI	Passing	Norm Van Brocklin	9/19, 193 YDS, 2 TDs, 2 INTs
PHI	Rushing	Clarence Peaks	14 CAR, 88 YDS, 2 TDs
PHI	Receiving	Clarence Peaks	3 REC, 10 YDS

Scoring summary

Quarter	Time	Drive			Team	Scoring information	Score	
Quarter	Time	Plays	Yards	TOP	Team	Scoring information	DET	PHI
1	6:55	8	80		Eagles	Peaks 1-yard touchdown run, Walston kick good	0	7
2	7:45	4	38		Eagles	Dean 22-yard touchdown reception from Van Brocklin, Walston kick good	0	14
2	4:22				Lions	33-yard field goal by Martin	3	14
3	4:23	—	—	—	Lions	Interception returned 17 yards for touchdown by Schmidt, Martin kick good	10	21
4	12:13	2	38		Eagles	Walston 38-yard touchdown reception from Van Brocklin, Walston kick good	10	21
4	6:15	3	61		Eagles	Peaks 49-yard touchdown run, Walston kick good	10	28
"TOP" = time of possession. For other American football terms, see Glossary of American football.							10	28

- Point spread: Eagles –7
- Over/under:
- Time of game:

Lions	Game statistics	Eagles
14	First downs	16
25–154	Rushes–yards	40–139
162	Passing yards	190
14–37–4	Passes	10–23–2
40	Sacked–yards	0
122	Net passing yards	190
276	Total yards	329
151	Return yards	140
5–52.4	Punts	8–44.3
3–2	Fumbles–lost	1–0
6–57	Penalties–yards	9–81
	Time of possession	

Individual stats

- Passing: Van Brocklin – 9/19, 193 YDS, 2 TDs, 2 INTs; Jurgensen – 1/4, –3 YDS
- Rushing: Peaks – 14 CAR, 88 YDS, 2 TDs; Dean – 14 CAR, 29 YDS; Barnes – 10 CAR, 19 YDS; Brown – 2 CAR, 3 YDS
- Receiving: Peaks – 3 REC, 10 YDS; Walston – 2 REC, 58 YDS, 1 TD; Dean – 2 REC, 43 YDS, 1 TD; McDonald – 1 REC, 51 YDS; Retzlaff – 1 REC, 25 YDS; Barnes – 1 REC, 3 YDS
- Kickoff returns: Brown – 2 KR, 55 YDS; Dean – 1 KR, 24 YDS
- Punt returns: Dean – 2 PR, 8 YDS; Brown – 2 PR, 7 YDS
- Punting: Van Brocklin – 8 PUNTS, 354 YARDS
- Kicking: Walston – 4/4 PAT
- Interceptions: Johnson – 2 INT, 33 YDS; Burroughs – 1 INT, 13 YDS; Bednarik – 1 INT, 0 YDS

Officials

- Referee: (#3) Bill Downes
- Umpire: (#20) Frank Sinkovitz
- Head linesman: (#48) John Highberger
- Back judge: (#25) Tom Kelleher
- Field judge: (#22) Charles Sweeney

==== Week 5 (Sunday, October 23, 1960): at Cleveland Browns ====
Week 5: Philadelphia Eagles 31 at Cleveland Browns 29 – Game summary

Quarter	1	2	3	4	Total
**Eagles** (4–1)	7	0	14	10	**31**
Browns (3–1)	3	12	7	7	**29**

at Cleveland Municipal Stadium • Cleveland, Ohio

- Date: October 23, 1960
- Game time: 2:00 p.m. EDT
- Game weather: Temperature: 52 °F (11 °C) • **Relative Humidity** 61% • Wind: 18 mph (29 km/h)
- Game attendance: 64,850
- Referee: Ron Gibbs
- TV announcers (CBS): Jack Whitaker (play-by-play) and Bosh Pritchard (analyst)

Team	Category	Player	Statistics
PHI	Passing	Norm Van Brocklin	17/26, 292 YDS, 3 TDs, 1 INT
PHI	Rushing	Clarence Peaks	13 CAR, 102 YDS
PHI	Receiving	Billy Ray Barnes	7 REC, 48 YDS, 1 TD
CLE	Passing	Milt Plum	16/22, 289 YDS, 2 TDs
CLE	Rushing	Jim Brown	22 CAR, 167 YDS, 1 TD
CLE	Receiving	Bobby Mitchell	7 REC, 70 YDS, 1 TD

Scoring summary

Quarter	Time	Drive			Team	Scoring information	Score	
Quarter	Time	Plays	Yards	TOP	Team	Scoring information	PHI	CLE
1	11:10	1	49		Eagles	Walston 49-yard touchdown reception from Van Brocklin, Walston kick good	7	0
1	4:25				Browns	12-yard field goal by Baker	7	3
2	13:25				Browns	25-yard field goal by Baker	7	6
2	10:25	2	85		Browns	Clakre 86-yard touchdown reception from Plum, Baker kick no good	7	12
2	0:05				Browns	44-yard field goal by Baker	7	15
3	10:20	2	80		Browns	Brown 71-yard touchdown run, Baker kick good	7	22
3	8:10	6	74		Eagles	Barnes 2-yard touchdown run, Walston kick good	14	22
3	4:53	1	57		Eagles	Walston 57-yard touchdown reception from Van Brocklin, Walston kick good	21	22
4	14:55	7	64		Eagles	Barnes 8-yard touchdown reception from Van Brocklin, Walston kick good	28	22
4	8:55	11	88		Browns	Mitchell 3-yard touchdown reception from Plum, Baker kick good	28	29
4	0:10				Eagles	38-yard field goal by Walston	31	29
"TOP" = time of possession. For other American football terms, see Glossary of American football.							31	29

- Point spread: Eagles +10
- Over/under:
- Time of game:

Eagles	Game statistics	Browns
18	First downs	21
24–136	Rushes–yards	36–202
292	Passing yards	289
17–26–1	Passes	16–22–0
0	Sacked–yards	40
292	Net passing yards	249
426	Total yards	451
97	Return yards	100
5–37.0	Punts	5–46.8
1–1	Fumbles–lost	0–0
4–58	Penalties–yards	7–114
	Time of possession	

Individual stats

- Passing: Van Brocklin – 17/26, 292 YDS, 3 TDs, 1 INT
- Rushing: Peaks – 13 CAR, 102 YDS; Barnes – 9 CAR, 25 YDS, 1 TD; Dean – 1 CAR, 8 YDS; Van Brocklin – 1 CAR, 1 YD
- Receiving: Barnes – 7 REC, 48 YDS, 1 TD; Walston – 4 REC, 94 TDS, 1 TD; Retzlaff – 3 REC, 80 YDS; McDonald – 2 REC, 66 YDS, 1 TD; Peaks – 1 REC, 4 YDS
- Kickoff returns: Dean – 5 KR, 76 YDS; Robb – 1 KR, 15 YDS; Baughan – 1 KR, 1 YD
- Punt returns: Dean – 3 PR, 5 YDS
- Punting: Van Brocklin – 5 PUNTS, 236 YDS
- Kicking: Walston – 4/4 PAT, 1/2 FG
- Eagles Missed Field Goals: Walston 45

Officials

- Referee: (#5) Ron Gibbs
- Umpire: (#18) Tony Sacco
- Head linesman: (#26) Ed Marion
- Back judge: (#37) Cleo Diehl
- Field judge: (#16) Mike Lisetski

==== Week 7 (Sunday, November 6, 1960) vs. Pittsburgh Steelers ====
Week 7: Pittsburgh Steelers 7 at Philadelphia Eagles 34 – Game summary

Quarter	1	2	3	4	Total
Steelers (2–4–1)	0	0	0	7	**7**
**Eagles** (5–1)	14	3	7	10	**34**

at Franklin Field • Philadelphia, Pennsylvania

- Date: November 6, 1960
- Game time: 1:30 p.m. EST
- Game weather: Temperature: 42 °F (6 °C) • **Relative Humidity** 71% • Wind: 12 mph (19 km/h)
- Game attendance: 58,324
- Referee: John Pace

Team	Category	Player	Statistics
PIT	Passing	Tom Tracy	2/2, 73 YDS, 1 TD
PIT	Rushing	Tom Tracy	11 VAR, 42 YDS
PIT	Receiving	Preston Carpenter	4 REC, 21 YDS
PHI	Passing	Norm Van Brocklin	19/30, 295 YDS, 3 TDs
PHI	Rushing	Clarence Peaks	16 VAR, 78 YDS
PHI	Receiving	Tommy McDonald	8 REC, 146 YDS, 3 TDs

Scoring summary

Quarter	Time	Drive			Team	Scoring information	Score	
Quarter	Time	Plays	Yards	TOP	Team	Scoring information	PIT	PHI
1	11:19	8	71		Eagles	Barnes 9-yard touchdown run, Walston kick good	0	7
1	1:27	11	76		Eagles	McDonald 24-yard touchdown reception from Van Brocklin, Walston kick good	0	14
2	3:56				Eagles	21-yard field goal by Walston	0	17
3	4:19	1	39		Eagles	McDonald 39-yard touchdown reception from Van Brocklin, Walston kick good	0	24
4	12:28				Eagles	11-yard field goal by Walston	0	27
4	8:21	8	80		Steelers	Dial 50-yard touchdown reception from Tracy, Layne kick good	7	27
4	5:25	7	64		Eagles	McDonald 26-yard touchdown reception from Van Brocklin, Walston kick good	7	34
"TOP" = time of possession. For other American football terms, see Glossary of American football.							7	34

- Point spread: Eagles –6½
- Over/under:
- Time of game:

Steelers	Game statistics	Eagles
11	First downs	24
27–104	Rushes–yards	39–167
108	Passing yards	320
9–26–3	Passes	21–35–0
0	Sacked–yards	0
108	Net passing yards	320
212	Total yards	487
89	Return yards	85
6–44.3	Punts	3–41.3
2–0	Fumbles–lost	1–0
4–40	Penalties–yards	9–98
	Time of possession	

Individual stats

- Passing: Van Brocklin – 19/30, 295 YDS, 3 TDs; Jurgensen – 2/4, 25 YDS; Barnes – 0/1, 0 YDS
- Rushing: Peaks – 16 VAR, 78 YDS; Barnes – 13 CAR, 45 YDS, 1 TD; Dean – 9 CAR, 43 YDS; Van Brocklin – 1 CAR, 1 YD
- Receiving: McDonald – 8 REC, 146 YDS, 3 TDs; Retzlaff – 4 REC, 66 YDS; Peaks – 4 REC, 53 YDS; Walston – 3 REC, 55 YDS; Brown – 1 REC, 7 YDS; Barnes – 1 REC, –2 YDS
- Kickoff returns: Brown – 1 KR, 26 YDS; Baughan – 1 KR, 17 YDS
- Punt returns: Dean – 4 PR, 28 YDS
- Punting: Van Brocklin – 3 PUNTS, 124 YARDS
- Kicking: Walston – 4/4 PAT, 2/3 FG
- Interceptions: Freeman – 1 INT, 13 YDS; Johnson – 1 INT, 1 YD; Bednarik – 1 INT, 0 YDS
- Eagles Missed Field Goals: Walston 32

Officials

- Referee: (#55) John Pace
- Umpire: (#17) James Beiersdorfer
- Head linesman: (#31) Charlie Berry
- Back judge: (#47) Ralph Vandersburg
- Field judge: (#21) Fred Swearingen

==== Week 8 (Sunday, November 13, 1960): at Washington Redskins ====
Week 8: Washington Redskins 7 at Philadelphia Eagles 34 – Game summary

Quarter	1	2	3	4	Total
Redskins (1–4–2)	3	0	7	3	**13**
{{{home}}}	0	3	6	10	**19**

at Franklin Field • Philadelphia, Pennsylvania

- Date: November 13, 1960
- Game time: 1:30 p.m. EST
- Game weather: Temperature: 39 °F (4 °C) • **Relative Humidity** 68% • Wind: 5 mph (8 km/h)
- Game attendance: 39,361
- TV announcers (CBS): Jim Gibbons (play-by-play) and Eddie Gallaher (analyst)

Team	Category	Player	Statistics
WAS	Passing		
WAS	Rushing		
WAS	Receiving		
PHI	Passing		
PHI	Rushing		
PHI	Receiving		

Scoring summary

Quarter	Time	Drive			Team	Scoring information	Score	
Quarter	Time	Plays	Yards	TOP	Team	Scoring information	WAS	PHI
"TOP" = time of possession. For other American football terms, see Glossary of American football.							13	19

- Point spread: Eagles –14
- Over/under:
- Time of game:

Redskins	Game statistics	Eagles
	First downs	
	Rushes–yards	
	Passing yards	
	Passes	
	Sacked–yards	
	Net passing yards	
	Total yards	
	Return yards	
	Punts	
	Fumbles–lost	
	Penalties–yards	
	Time of possession	

==== Week 9 (Sunday, November 20, 1960): at New York Giants ====
Week 9: Philadelphia Eagles 17 at New York Giants 10 – Game summary

Quarter	1	2	3	4	Total
**Eagles** (7–1)	0	0	7	10	**17**
Giants (5–2–1)	7	3	0	0	**10**

at Yankee Stadium • The Bronx, New York

- Date: November 20, 1960
- Game time: 2:00 p.m. EST
- Game weather: Temperature: 49 °F (9 °C) • **Relative Humidity** 51% • Wind: 12 mph (19 km/h)
- Game attendance: 63,571
- Referee: George Rennix
- TV announcers (CBS): Jack Whitaker (play-by-play) and Bosh Pritchard (analyst)

Team	Category	Player	Statistics
PHI	Passing	Norm Van Brocklin	13/24, 236 YDS, 1 TD
PHI	Rushing	Ted Dean	19 CAR, 34 YDS
PHI	Receiving	Bobby Walston	6 REC, 119 YDS
NYG	Passing	George Shaw	11/24, 196 YDS, 1 INT
NYG	Rushing	Mel Triplett	19 CAR, 62 YDS
NYG	Receiving	Frank Gifford	5 REC, 89 YDS

Scoring summary

Quarter	Time	Drive			Team	Scoring information	Score	
Quarter	Time	Plays	Yards	TOP	Team	Scoring information	PHI	NYG
1	2:13	10	75		Giants	Morrison 1-yard touchdown run, Summerall kick good	0	7
2	10:39				Giants	26-yard field goal by Summerall	0	10
3	6:08	6	80		Eagles	McDonald 35-yard touchdown reception from Van Brocklin, Walston kick good	7	10
4	4:24				Eagles	12-yard field goal by Walston	10	10
4	2:37	—	—	—	Eagles	Fumble recovery returned 38 yards for touchdown by Carr, Walston kick good	17	10
"TOP" = time of possession. For other American football terms, see Glossary of American football.							17	10

- Point spread: Eagles +3½
- Over/under:
- Time of game:

Eagles	Game statistics	Giants
14	First downs	17
30–61	Rushes–yards	40–154
236	Passing yards	209
13–24–0	Passes	12–25–1
33	Sacked–yards	5
203	Net passing yards	204
264	Total yards	358
50	Return yards	86
7–39.9	Punts	2–46.0
1–0	Fumbles–lost	5–3
3–35	Penalties–yards	4–50
	Time of possession	

Individual stats

- Passing: Van Brocklin – 13/24, 236 YDS, 1 TD
- Rushing: Dean – 19 CAR, 34 YDS; Barnes – 10 CAR, 27 YDS; Van Brocklin – 1 CAR, 0 YDS
- Receiving: Walston – 6 REC, 119 YDS; McDonald – 4 REC, 80 YDS, 1 TD; Dean – 2 REC, 19 YDS; Retzlaff – 1 REC, 18 YDS
- Kickoff returns: Dean – 2 KR, 45 YDS
- Punt returns: Dean – 1 PR, 2 YDS
- Punting: Van Brocklin – 7 PUNTS, 279 YARDS
- Kicking: Walston – 2/2 PAT, 1/2 FG
- Interceptions: Freeman – 1 INT, 3 YDS
- Eagles Missed Field Goals: Walston 17 (BL)

Officials

- Referee: (#52) George Rennix
- Umpire: (#57) Joe Connell
- Head linesman: (#31) Charlie Berry
- Back judge: (#29) Stan Jaworoski
- Field judge: (#27) Herman Rohrig

==== Week 10 (Sunday, November 27, 1960): vs. New York Giants ====
Week 10: New York Giants 23 at Philadelphia Eagles 31 – Game summary

Quarter	1	2	3	4	Total
Giants (5–3–1)	17	3	3	0	**23**
**Eagles** (8–1)	0	17	0	14	**31**

at Franklin Field • Philadelphia, Pennsylvania

- Date: November 27, 1960
- Game time: 1:30 p.m. EST
- Game weather: Temperature: 49 °F (9 °C) • **Relative Humidity** 85% • Wind: 7 mph (11 km/h)
- Game attendance: 60,547
- Referee: Ron Gibbs
- TV announcers (CBS): Chris Schenkel (play-by-play) and Johnny Lujack (analyst)

Team	Category	Player	Statistics
NYG	Passing	George Shaw	9/19, 179 YDS, 2 TDs, 4 INTs
NYG	Rushing	Ed Sutton	5 CAR, 57 YDS
NYG	Receiving	Kyle Rote	4 REC, 124 YDS, 2 TDs
PHI	Passing	Norm Van Brocklin	13/23, 147 YDS, 3 TDs, 3 INTs
PHI	Rushing	Billy Ray Barnes	17 CAR, 35 YDS
PHI	Receiving	Ted Dean	5 REC, 74 YDS

Scoring summary

Quarter	Time	Drive			Team	Scoring information	Score	
Quarter	Time	Plays	Yards	TOP	Team	Scoring information	NYG	PHI
1	14:13	1	71		Giants	Rote 71-yard touchdown reception from Shaw, Summerall kick good	7	0
1	8:11	8	83		Giants	Rote 11-yard touchdown reception from Shaw, Summerall kick good	14	0
1	2:11				Giants	35-yard field goal by Summerall	17	0
2	8:20				Eagles	15-yard field goal by Walston	17	3
2	5:15	3	26		Eagles	Dean 25-yard touchdown reception from Van Brocklin, Walston kick good	17	10
2	3:00	5	33		Eagles	Fumble recovery returned 0 yards for touchdown by Smith, Walston kick good	17	17
2	0:09				Giants	35-yard field goal by Summerall	20	17
3	7:31				Giants	15-yard field goal by Summerall	23	17
4	14:51	1	49		Eagles	Dean 49-yard touchdown reception from Van Brocklin, Walston kick good	23	24
4	9:35	8	30		Eagles	Barnes 8-yard touchdown reception from Van Brocklin, Walston kick good	23	31
"TOP" = time of possession. For other American football terms, see Glossary of American football.							23	31

- Point spread: Eagles –6½
- Over/under:
- Time of game:

Giants	Game statistics	Eagles
13	First downs	12
35–144	Rushes–yards	29–64
205	Passing yards	147
11–21–4	Passes	13–23–3
12	Sacked–yards	0
193	Net passing yards	147
337	Total yards	211
168	Return yards	170
3–45.0	Punts	6–45.3
3–1	Fumbles–lost	3–0
4–41	Penalties–yards	6–50
	Time of possession	

Individual stats

- Passing: Van Brocklin – 13/23, 147 YDS, 3 TDs, 3 INTs
- Rushing: Barnes – 17 CAR, 35 YDS; Dean – 11 CAR, 28 YDS; Van Brocklin – 1 CAR, 1 YD
- Receiving: Dean – 5 REC, 74 YDS; McDonald – 3 REC, 46 YDS; Walston – 2 REC, 11 YDS; Retzlaff – 2 REC, 8 YDS; Barnes – 1 REC, 8 YDS, 1 TD
- Kickoff returns: Dean – 3 KR, 76 YDS; Brown – 1 KR, 22 YDS
- Punt returns: Dean – 2 PR, 5 YDS
- Punting: Van Brocklin – 6 PUNTS, 274 YARDS
- Kicking: Walston – 4/4 PAT, 1/1 FG
- Interceptions: Burroughs – 2 INTs, 2 YDS; Freeman – 1 INT, 48 YDS; Baughan – 1 INT, 17 YDS

Officials

- Referee: (#5) Ron Gibbs
- Umpire: (#18) Tony Sacco
- Head linesman: (#31) Charlie Berry
- Back judge: (#37) Cleo Diehl
- Field judge: (#22) Charles Sweeney

==== Week 11 (Sunday, December 4, 1960): at St. Louis Cardinals ====
Week 11: Philadelphia Eagles 20 at St. Louis Cardinals 6 – Game summary

Quarter	1	2	3	4	Total
**Eagles** (9–1)	3	7	3	7	**20**
Cardinals (5–5–1)	0	0	6	0	**6**

at Busch Stadium • St. Louis, Missouri

- Date: December 4, 1960
- Game time: 2:00 p.m. EDT
- Game weather: Temperature: 53 °F (12 °C) • **Relative Humidity** 40% • Wind: 16 mph (26 km/h)
- Game attendance: 23,666
- Referee: Emil Heintz
- TV announcers (CBS): Jack Whitaker (play-by-play) and Bosh Pritchard (analyst)

Team	Category	Player	Statistics
PHI	Passing	Norm Van Brocklin	13/27, 251 YDS, 2 TDs, 1 INT
PHI	Rushing	Ted Dean	11 CAR, 39 YDS
PHI	Receiving	Pete Retzlaff	5 REC, 123 YDS, 1 TD
STL	Passing	John Roach	2/5, 18 YDS, 1 INT
STL	Rushing	John David Crow	15 CAR, 74 YDS
STL	Receiving	Sonny Randle	2 REC, 18 YDS

Scoring summary

Quarter	Time	Drive			Team	Scoring information	Score	
Quarter	Time	Plays	Yards	TOP	Team	Scoring information	PHI	STL
1	6:27				Eagles	32-yard field goal by Walston	3	0
2	1:04	10	78		Eagles	Retzlaff 22-yard touchdown reception from Van Brocklin, Walston kick good	10	0
3	12:39				Eagles	39-yard field goal by Walston	13	0
3	2:17	3	26		Cardinals	Hammack 2-yard touchdown run, Conrad kick no good	13	6
4	10:34	5	46		Eagles	McDonald 25-yard touchdown reception from Van Brocklin, Walston kick good	20	6
"TOP" = time of possession. For other American football terms, see Glossary of American football.							20	6

- Point spread: Eagles –5
- Over/under:
- Time of game:

Eagles	Game statistics	Cardinals
10	First downs	13
25–54	Rushes–yards	44–165
251	Passing yards	45
13–27–1	Passes	5–16–2
37	Sacked–yards	20
214	Net passing yards	25
268	Total yards	190
65	Return yards	55
8–48.1	Punts	8–47.8
1–0	Fumbles–lost	3–0
4–46	Penalties–yards	1–15
	Time of possession	

Individual stats

- Passing: Van Brocklin – 13/27, 251 YDS, 2 TDs, 1 INT
- Rushing: Dean – 11 CAR, 39 YDS; Sapp – 3 CAR, 14 YDS; Barnes – 10 CAR, 4 YDS; Van Brocklin – 1 CAR, –3 YDS
- Receiving: Retzlaff – 5 REC, 123 YDS, 1 TD; McDonald – 3 REC, 66 YDS, 1 TD; Dean – 2 REC, 43 YDS; Sapp – 1 REC, 14 YDS; Walston – 1 REC, 4 YDS; Barnes – 1 REC, 1 YD
- Kickoff returns: McDonald – 2 KR, 45 YDS
- Punt returns: Brown – 3 PR, 10 YDS; Jackson – 1 PR, 5 YDS; Dean – 1 PR, 3 YDS; McDonald – 1 PR, 2 YDS
- Punting: Van Brocklin – 8 PUNTS, 385 YARDS
- Kicking: Walston – 2/2 PAT, 2/2 FG
- Interceptions: Burroughs – 1 INT, 46 YDS; Carr – 1 INT, 4 YDS

Officials

- Referee: (#9) Emil Heintz
- Umpire: (#12) Cletus Gardner
- Head linesman: (#30) George Murphy
- Back judge: (#41) Jack Nix
- Field judge: (#56) Norm Schachter

==== Week 12 (Sunday, December 11, 1960) at Pittsburgh Steelers ====
Week 12: Philadelphia Eagles 21 at Pittsburgh Steelers 27 – Game summary

Quarter	1	2	3	4	Total
Eagles (9–2)	0	0	0	21	**21**
**Steelers** (5–5–1)	13	14	0	0	**27**

at Forbes Field • Pittsburgh, Pennsylvania

- Date: December 11, 1960
- Game time: 2:00 p.m. EDT
- Game weather: Temperature: 28 °F (−2 °C) • **Relative Humidity** 76% • Wind: 12 mph (19 km/h) • Wind Chlll: 18 °F (−8 °C)
- Game attendance: 22,101
- Referee: Emil Heintz
- TV announcers (CBS): Jack Whitaker (play-by-play) and Bosh Pritchard (analyst)

Team	Category	Player	Statistics
PHI	Passing		
PHI	Rushing		
PHI	Receiving		
PIT	Passing		
PIT	Rushing		
PIT	Receiving		

Scoring summary

Quarter	Time	Drive			Team	Scoring information	Score	
Quarter	Time	Plays	Yards	TOP	Team	Scoring information	PHI	PIT
1	6:15	6	44		Steelers	Layne 7-yard touchdown run, Layne kick good	0	7
1	1:47	6	54		Steelers	Johnson 7-yard touchdown reception from Layne, Layne kick no good	0	13
2	11:20	4	99		Steelers	Johnson 88-yard touchdown run, Layne kick good	0	20
2	0:29	4	64		Steelers	Dial 15-yard touchdown reception from Layne, Layne kick good	0	27
4	14:05	2	71		Eagles	Brown 53-yard touchdown reception from Jurgensen, Walston kick good	7	27
4	11:33	4	37		Eagles	Brown 7-yard touchdown run, Walston kick good	14	27
4	5:14	3	59		Eagles	McDonald 19-yard touchdown reception from Jurgensen, Walston kick good	21	27
"TOP" = time of possession. For other American football terms, see Glossary of American football.							21	27

- Point spread: Eagles –2
- Over/under:
- Time of game:

Eagles	Game statistics	Steelers
16	First downs	21
19–34	Rushes–yards	46–275
307	Passing yards	209
16–40–2	Passes	14–20–3
3–33	Sacked–yards	0–0
274	Net passing yards	209
308	Total yards	484
141	Return yards	124
7–38.1	Punts	5–44.0
3–1	Fumbles–lost	5–3
2–20	Penalties–yards	4–59
	Time of possession	

Officials

- Referee: (#9) Emil Heintz
- Umpire: (#12) Cletus Gardner
- Head linesman: (#30) George Murphy
- Back judge: (#41) Jack Nix
- Field judge: (#54) Joe Gonzales

==== Week 13 (Sunday, December 18, 1960): at Washington Redskins ====
Week 13: Philadelphia Eagles 38 at Washington Redskins 28 – Game summary

Quarter	1	2	3	4	Total
**Eagles** (10–2)	7	10	7	14	**38**
Redskins (1–9–2)	7	7	7	7	**28**

at Griffith Stadium • Washington, D.C.

- Date: December 18, 1960
- Game time: 2:00 p.m. EST
- Game weather: Temperature: 29 °F (−2 °C) • **Relative Humidity** 66% • Wind: 3 mph (5 km/h) • Wind Chlll: 26 °F (−3 °C)
- Game attendance: 20,558
- TV announcers (CBS): Jack Whitaker (play-by-play) and Bosh Pritchard (analyst)

Team	Category	Player	Statistics
PHI	Passing		
PHI	Rushing		
PHI	Receiving		
WAS	Passing		
WAS	Rushing		
WAS	Receiving		

Scoring summary

Quarter	Time	Drive			Team	Scoring information	Score	
Quarter	Time	Plays	Yards	TOP	Team	Scoring information	PHI	WAS
"TOP" = time of possession. For other American football terms, see Glossary of American football.							38	28

- Point spread: Eagles –7½
- Over/under:
- Time of game:

Eagles	Game statistics	Redskins
	First downs	
	Rushes–yards	
	Passing yards	
	Passes	
	Sacked–yards	
	Net passing yards	
	Total yards	
	Return yards	
	Punts	
	Fumbles–lost	
	Penalties–yards	
	Time of possession	

=== Standings ===
NFL Eastern Conference
	W	L	T	PCT	CONF	PF	PA	STK
Philadelphia Eagles	10	2	0	.833	8–2	321	246	W1
Cleveland Browns	8	3	1	.727	6–3–1	362	217	W3
New York Giants	6	4	2	.600	5–4–1	271	261	L1
St. Louis Cardinals	6	5	1	.545	4–5–1	288	230	W1
Pittsburgh Steelers	5	6	1	.455	4–5–1	240	275	L1
Washington Redskins	1	9	2	.100	0–8–2	178	309	L8

Note: Tie games were not officially counted in the standings until 1972.

NFL Western Conference
	W	L	T	PCT	CONF	PF	PA	STK
Green Bay Packers	8	4	0	.667	7–4	332	209	W3
Detroit Lions	7	5	0	.583	7–4	239	212	W4
San Francisco 49ers	7	5	0	.583	7–4	208	205	W1
Baltimore Colts	6	6	0	.500	5–6	288	234	L4
Chicago Bears	5	6	1	.455	5–5–1	194	299	L3
Los Angeles Rams	4	7	1	.364	4–6–1	265	297	L1
Dallas Cowboys	0	11	1	.000	0–6	177	369	L1

Note: Tie games were not officially counted in the standings until 1972.

== Postseason ==
Round	Date	Opponent	Result	Venue	Attendance	Recap
Championship	December 26	Green Bay Packers	W 17–13	Franklin Field	67,325	Recap

=== Game summaries ===
==== 1960 NFL Championship Game (Monday, December 26, 1960): vs. Green Bay Packers ====
1960 NFL Championship Game (Monday, December 26, 1960): Green Bay Packers 13 vs. Philadelphia Eagles 17 – Game summary

Quarter	1	2	3	4	Total
Packers (0–1)	3	3	0	7	13
Eagles (1–0)	0	10	0	7	17

at Franklin Field • Philadelphia, Pennsylvania

- Date: December 26, 1960
- Game time: 12:00 p.m. EST
- Game weather: Temperature: 28 °F (−2 °C) • Relative Humidity 84% • Wind: 7 mph (11 km/h) • Wind Chlll: 21 °F (−6 °C)
- Game attendance: 67,325
- Referee: Ron Gibbs
- TV announcers (NBC/NBC Radio): Lindsey Nelson and Ray Scott (play-by-play)/Jack Whitaker and Blaine Walsh (play-by-play)

Team	Category	Player	Statistics
GB	Passing	Bart Starr	21/34, 178 YDS, 1 TD
GB	Rushing	Jim Taylor	24 CAR, 105 YDS
GB	Receiving	Gary Knafelc; Taylor	6 REC, 76 YDS; 6 REC, 46 YDS
PHI	Passing	Norm Van Brocklin	9/20, 204 YDS, 1 TD, 1 INT
PHI	Rushing	Ted Dean	13 CAR, 54 YDS, 1 TD
PHI	Receiving	Tommy McDonald; Bobby Walston	3 REC, 90 YDS, 1 TD; 3 REC, 38 YDS

Scoring summary

Quarter	Time	Drive			Team	Scoring information	Score	
Quarter	Time	Plays	Yards	TOP	Team	Scoring information	GB	PHI
1	8:40				Packers	20-yard field goal by Hornung	3	0
2	13:16				Packers	20-yard field goal by Hornung	6	0
2	6:52	2	57		Eagles	McDonald 35-yard touchdown reception from Van Brocklin, Walston kick good	6	7
2	3:12				Eagles	15-yard field goal by Walston	6	10
4	13:07	12	80		Packers	McGee 7-yard touchdown reception from Starr, Hornung kick good	13	10
4	9:39	7	61		Eagles	Dean 5-yard touchdown run, Walston kick good	13	17
"TOP" = time of possession. For other American football terms, see Glossary of American football.							13	17

You can get up now, Taylor. This (expletive deleted) game's over.

— ~Chuck Bednarik, as he lay on top of Jim Taylor after making the tackle on the game's final play.
- Point spread: Eagles +2½
- Over/under:
- Time of game:

Packers	Game statistics	Eagles
22	First downs	13
42–223	Rushes–yards	28–99
178	Passing yards	204
21–35–0	Passes	9–20–1
0–0	Sacked–yards	1–7
178	Net passing yards	197
401	Total yards	296
67	Return yards	101
5–45.2	Punts	6–39.5
1–1	Fumbles–lost	3–2
4–27	Penalties–yards	0–0
	Time of possession	

Individual stats

- Passing: Van Brocklin – 9/20, 204 YDS, 1 TD, 1 INT
- Rushing: Dean – 13 CAR, 54 YDS, 1 TD; Barnes – 13 CAR, 42 YDS; Van Brocklin – 2 CAR, 3 YDS
- Receiving: McDonald – 3 REC, 90 YDS, 1 TD; Walston – 3 REC, 38 YDS; Retzlaff – 1 REC, 41 YDS; Dean – 1 REC, 22 YDS; Barnes – 1 REC, 13 YDS
- Kickoff returns: Dean – 1 KR, 58 YDS; Brown – 1 KR, 20 YDS; Lucas – 1 KR, 9 YDS; Robb – 1 KR, 4 YDS
- Punt returns: Dean – 1 PR, 10 YDS
- Punts: Van Brocklin – 6 PUNTS, 237 YARDS
- Kicking: Walston – 2/2 PAT, 1/1 FG

Officials

- Referee: (#5) Ron Gibbs
- Umpire: (#57) Joe Connell
- Head linesman: (#48) John Highberger
- Back judge: (#10) Sam Giangreco
- Field judge: (#27) Herm Rohrig
- Alternate referee: (#35) Art McNally
- Alternate umpire: (#20) Frank Sinkovitz
- Alternate head linesman: (#31) Charlie Berry
- Alternate back judge: (#29) Stan Jaworowski
- Alternate field judge: (#16) Mike Lisetski

== Aftermath ==
Soon after the championship game against Green Bay, 61-year-old Buck Shaw retired as head coach of the Eagles. Quarterback and 12-year veteran Norm Van Brocklin retired after the game also and expected to be named head coach, but assistant coach Nick Skorich was promoted; he led the Eagles for the next three years, through the 1963 season.

Van Brocklin, age 34, was named head coach of the expansion Minnesota Vikings in January 1961. In the 1961 expansion draft the Eagles lost guard Gerry Huth, defensive back Gene Johnson, and center Bill Lapham to Minnesota.

== Awards and honors ==
1960 Pro Bowl players:

- QB – Norm Van Brocklin
- TE – Pete Retzlaff
- OE – Bobby Walston
- FL – Tommy McDonald
- DT – Marion Campbell
- LB – Maxie Baughan
- LB – Chuck Bednarik
- CB – Tom Brookshier

League leaders

- Norm Van Brocklin finishes 2nd to Johnny Unitas in Passing Attempts, Completions, Yards, and TDs
- Norm Van Brocklin finishes 2nd to Milt Plum in Yards per Attempt and Passer Rating
- Ted Dean leads league in KO Returns and 2nd in Punt Returns

Other awards

- Chuck Bednarik, All-Pro Selection
- Norm Van Brocklin, Bert Bell Award
- AP NFL MVP – Norm Van Brocklin
- UPI MVP – Norm Van Brocklin
