= 1962 Philadelphia Eagles season =

NFL team season

- Owner: Happy Hundred
- Head coach: Nick Skorich
- Home stadium: Franklin Field

Results
- Record: 3–10–1
- Division place: 7th NFL Eastern
- Playoffs: Did not qualify
- Pro Bowlers: FL Tommy McDonald; HB Timmy Brown

The 1962 Philadelphia Eagles season was the franchise's 30th season in the National Football League. The team had a very disappointing record of 3 wins 10 losses and 1 tie.

== Offseason ==
The 1962 NFL draft and the 1962 AFL draft

== Regular season ==
=== Schedule ===
Week	Date	Opponent	Result	Record	Venue	Attendance
1	September 16	**St. Louis Cardinals**	**L** 21–27	0–1	Franklin Field	60,671
2	September 23	**New York Giants**	**L** 13–29	0–2	Franklin Field	60,671
3	September 30	**Cleveland Browns**	**W** 35–7	1–2	Franklin Field	60,671
4	October 6	at **Pittsburgh Steelers**	**L** 7–13	1–3	Forbes Field	23,164
5	October 14	at **Dallas Cowboys**	**L** 19–41	1–4	Cotton Bowl	18,645
6	October 21	**Washington Redskins**	**L** 21–27	1–5	Franklin Field	60,671
7	October 28	at Minnesota Vikings	**L** 21–31	1–6	Metropolitan Stadium	30,071
8	November 4	at **Cleveland Browns**	**T** 14–14	1–6–1	Cleveland Municipal Stadium	63,848
9	November 11	Green Bay Packers	**L** 0–49	1–7–1	Franklin Field	60,671
10	November 18	at **New York Giants**	**L** 14–19	1–8–1	Yankee Stadium	62,705
11	November 25	**Dallas Cowboys**	**W** 28–14	2–8–1	Franklin Field	58,070
12	December 2	at **Washington Redskins**	**W** 37–14	3–8–1	RFK Stadium	32,229
13	December 9	**Pittsburgh Steelers**	**L** 17–26	3–9–1	Franklin Field	60,671
14	December 16	at **St. Louis Cardinals**	**L** 35–45	3–10–1	Busch Stadium	14,989

Note: Intra-conference opponents are in bold text.

== Standings ==
NFL Eastern Conference
	W	L	T	PCT	CONF	PF	PA	STK
New York Giants	12	2	0	.857	10–2	398	283	W9
Pittsburgh Steelers	9	5	0	.643	8–4	312	363	W3
Cleveland Browns	7	6	1	.538	6–5–1	291	257	W1
Washington Redskins	5	7	2	.417	4–6–2	305	376	L1
Dallas Cowboys	5	8	1	.385	4–7–1	398	402	L2
St. Louis Cardinals	4	9	1	.308	4–7–1	287	361	W2
Philadelphia Eagles	3	10	1	.231	3–8–1	282	356	L2

Note: Tie games were not officially counted in the standings until 1972.

== Roster ==
1962 Philadelphia Eagles roster
Quarterbacks (QB): 9 Sonny Jurgensen; 10 King Hill P; Running backs (RB): 22 Timmy Brown; 33 Merrill Douglas; 26 Clarence Peaks; 30 Theron Sapp; Wide receivers (WR): 20 Frank Budd; 80 Ken Gregory; 25 Tommy McDonald; 44 Pete Retzlaff; Tight ends (TE): 87 Dick Lucas; 85 Ralph Smith; 83 Bobby Walston K	Offensive linemen (OL): 67 Pete Case G; 64 Roy Hord G; 61 Howard Keys G/C; 75 Jim McCusker T; 51 Jim Schrader C; 76 J. D. Smith T; 62 John Wittenborn G; Defensive linemen (DL): 79 Gene Gossage DE; 74 Riley Gunnels DT; 77 John Kapele DE; 71 Joe Lewis DT; 68 Bobby Richards DE; 86 Dick Stafford DE	Linebackers (LB): 55 Maxie Baughan OLB; 60 Chuck Bednarik MLB; 42 Bob Harrison OLB; 29 John Nocera OLB; 63 Mike Woulfe MLB; Defensive backs (DB): 45 Don Burroughs FS; 21 Jimmy Carr SS; 27 Irv Cross CB; 23 Mike McClellan FS/CB; 48 Ben Scotti CB; Special teams (ST)	Reserve: 46 Glen Amerson CB/S (IR); 66 Bill Byrne G (IR); 41 Howard Cassady RB (IR); 35 Ted Dean RB (IR); 70 Jim Skaggs G (IR); 40 Tom Brookshier CB (IR); Rookies in italics
