= Bobby Walston =

American football player, coach, and administrator (1928–1987)

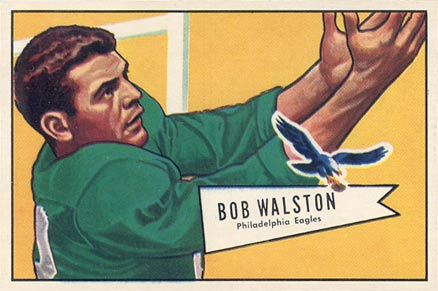
- Walston on a 1952 Bowman football card

No. 83
- Positions: End, placekicker

Personal information
- Born: October 17, 1928; Columbus, Ohio, U.S.
- Died: October 7, 1987 (aged 58); Elk Grove Village, Illinois, U.S.
- Listed height: 6 ft 0 in (1.83 m)
- Listed weight: 190 lb (86 kg)

Career information
- High school: Linden-McKinley (Columbus)
- College: Georgia (1947–1950)
- NFL draft: 1951: 14th round, 166th overall pick

Career history

Playing
- Philadelphia Eagles (1951–1962)

Coaching
- Miami Dolphins (1966–1967) Receivers / kicking coach

Operations
- Chicago Bears (1968–1974) Director of player personnel; Edmonton Eskimos (1978–1980) Scout; United States Football League (1983–1985) Scout

Awards and highlights
- NFL champion (1960); 2× Pro Bowl (1960-1961); NFL scoring leader (1954); NFL 1950s All-Decade Team; Philadelphia Sports Hall of Fame (2014); Philadelphia Eagles Hall of Fame; 2× Second-team All-SEC (1949, 1950)

Career NFL statistics
- Field goals made: 80
- Field goal attempts: 157
- Field goal %: 51
- Receptions: 311
- Receiving yards: 5,363
- Receiving touchdowns: 46
- Stats at Pro Football Reference

Robert Harold "Bobby" Walston (October 17, 1928 – October 7, 1987) was an American professional football player who was a wide receiver and placekicker for the Philadelphia Eagles of the National Football League (NFL). Walston was selected by the Pro Football Hall of Fame as a member of the NFL 1950s All-Decade Team. He played college football for the Georgia Bulldogs in the Southeastern Conference (SEC), and was selected in the 14th round of the 1951 NFL draft. He was the Rookie of the Year in 1951, led the NFL in scoring in 1954, and led the NFL in field goal percentage in 1957 and 1960. He was a member of the 1960 Eagles NFL championship team.

At the time Walston retired in 1962, only Lou Groza had more points in NFL history. He holds the Eagles' record for most points in a game. In 2019, he became a member of the Eagles Hall of Fame. Hall of Fame writer Ray Didinger once called Walston the most underrated player in Eagles' history. At Georgia, he was twice named second-team All-SEC. He never missed a game in college, or with the Eagles (including over 200 total preseason, regular season, and playoff games in the NFL).

After his playing career ended, Walston became the Eagles' player personnel director for two years, and served as head scout. In mid-1966, he was hired by the expansion Miami Dolphins to coach receivers and kickers, serving in that role for two seasons. In early 1968, Walston was hired as the Chicago Bears' player personnel director, and in mid-1971 also became assistant to Bears' president George Halas Jr., a role functionally equivalent to being general manager. Soon after Jim Finks became the team's general manager in 1974, Walston no longer held those positions; formally announcing his resignation in December 1974.

== Early life ==
Walston was born on October 17, 1928, in Columbus, Ohio. He attended Linden-McKinley High School in Columbus. He played on the school's football team, and was All-State at halfback.

== College career ==
Walston attended the University of Georgia, where he played football for the Bulldogs. He played halfback, wide receiver, safety, and kicker for Georgia, in the Southeastern Conference (SEC). As a freshman in 1947, he played halfback. Walston had 35 yards rushing on eight carries, and three receptions for 108 yards; with two of those receptions going for touchdowns. He had a 50-yard touchdown reception from Johnny Rauch in a late-October game against Clemson, and a 30- to 32-yard touchdown reception against Oklahoma A & M in mid-October.

In 1948, Walston caught 25 passes for 525 yards, scoring four touchdowns. He led the SEC in pass receptions, and was 13th nationally in most receptions. He had a 19-yard touchdown reception in a 35–0 win over Alabama in late October; a 28-yard touchdown pass against Furman in a 33–0 win; and a 44-yard touchdown pass for the first touchdown of the game in a 42–14 win over Auburn. Georgia was the SEC champion in 1948, and had a 9–2 record. The Associated Press (AP) ranked Georgia No. 8 that year. Georgia lost to Texas in the January 1, 1949, Orange Bowl, 41–28. Walston had multiple receptions in the game, including one for a touchdown. He made the All-SEC sophomore team.

As a junior in 1949, Walston had 17 receptions for 382 yards. He missed the season's last two games with a broken foot, but still had the fifth most receptions in the SEC. After three years, he had 45 receptions for 1,015 yards (averaging 22.3 yards per reception); and had scored 10 touchdowns and kicked 14 extra points over that time. The Associated Press and United Press named Walston second-team All-SEC at end in 1949.

In 1950, he had 12 receptions for 168 yards and one touchdown; second on the team to Zippy Morocco. The International News Service (INS) named Walston second-team All-SEC in 1950. Over his four year career at Georgia, Walston had 57 receptions for 1,183 yards, and 11 touchdowns. He never missed a game during his Bulldogs' career.

Walston was also a college light-heavyweight boxing champion, and a golden gloves finalist. After the 1952 NFL season ended, Walston returned to Georgia to obtain his degree, and helped coach the Bulldogs' spring practice.

== Professional career ==
The Philadelphia Eagles selected Walston in the 14th round of the 1951 NFL draft, 166th overall. Walston doubled as receiver and kicker for the Philadelphia Eagles for twelve seasons. As a rookie in 1951 he started all 12 Eagles' games. He had 31 receptions for 512 yards, and led the Eagles with eight touchdowns. He was tied for third in the NFL for most receiving touchdowns, and tied for seventh in yards per reception (16.5). Walston also served as the team's kicker, making six of 11 field goal attempts, and 28 or 31 extra point attempts. He led the Eagles in scoring (94 points), and was fourth in the NFL in scoring. His best game of the season was on October 21 against the New York Giants, when he had six receptions for 118 yards and two touchdowns, plus a field goal and three extra points; scoring 18 points. Walston was named Rookie of the Year in 1951.

In 1952, he started nine games, with 26 receptions for 469 yards and three touchdowns. He kicked eleven field goals and was a perfect 31-for-31 on extra point attempts; totaling 82 points on the season, sixth most in the NFL. In a late November game against the Cleveland Browns, he caught four passes for 121 yards with one touchdown; including a 65-yard reception on a pass from halfback Fred Enke. He also had four extra point conversions in that game.

Before the 1953 season Walston was in a contract dispute with the Eagles and received an offer from a Canadian football team. Eagles' general manager Vince McNally met with Walston in Georgia to negotiate his return to the Eagles. During the negotiations, Walston called his wife in Philadelphia who was crying because her pet chihuahua had died. When he told McNally, McNally said he would include a chihuahua puppy in the deal, which led to Walston's teammates nicknaming him "Chihuahua", which nickname became "Cheewa" over time.

His best receiving season was in 1953, when he caught 41 passes for 750 yards, garnering 18.3 yards per reception, scoring five touchdowns. He made only four of 13 field goal attempts, and was 45 for 48 on extra points. He was fourth in the NFL in scoring (87 points). The Eagles finished the season 7–4–1, second in the NFL East Division. He had three games with over 100 yards receiving that season. His best game was on November 8 against the New York Giants when he had eight receptions for 176 yards and two touchdowns, plus a field goal and three extra points. This included a 62-yard touchdown reception from Bobby Thomason who passed for 437 yards in that game.

The next season (1954), Walston had 581 yards on 31 receptions, but he scored 11 touchdowns as the Eagles once again went 7-4-1. He made four field goals and 36 extra points, scoring a total of 114 points during that 12-game season, the most in the NFL that year. On October 3, he had three touchdown catches on five receptions, 110 receiving yards and five extra point conversions (23 points in total) against the Chicago Cardinals. Two weeks later he had another game with three receiving touchdowns against the Washington Redskins, and kicked seven extra points.

His 25 points scored against Washington was a single game Eagle record (through at least 2019). Walston's 114 points that season were the most by an Eagle in a single season until his record was broken in 1984 by kicker Paul McFadden (116 points), during a 16-game season. His 114 points in now 20th all-time for an Eagles' season, but all of the 19 players ahead of him played in 16 or 17 game seasons (as of 2025). During the 1954 season he suffered a broken jaw. A doctor wired his mouth shut and prescribed three weeks of rest. The next day Walston took a pair of pliers and removed the wiring himself, and continued to play in every game for the remainder of the season, without missing a game.

In 1955, Walston had 27 receptions for 443 yards and three touchdowns. He was replaced by Dick Bielski as the team's primary kicker, but still made two of three field goal attempts and six of seven extra point attempts. In 1956, Walston led the Eagles with 39 receptions (tied for sixth best in the NFL) for 590 yards and three touchdowns. He became the team's primary kicker again, and made six field goals and 17 extra points.

In 1957, although he started all 12 games, Walston had only 11 receptions for 266 yards. Walston suffered a broken ring finger that season, and took Novocaine injections that allowed him to play with the injury and not miss a game. This was his worst season as a receiver in the NFL, however, other than his final season when he had a broken arm and could not play receiver (while continuing to serve as a kicker). He did make nine field goals in 12 attempts in 1957, the best field goal kicking percentage of his career; and was 20 for 21 in extra point attempts. Walston led the NFL in field goal percentage. The Eagles were 4–8 that second, one game out of last place in the East Division.

In 1958, Walston had 21 receptions for 298 yards and three touchdowns. He was six of 14 in field goal attempts, and made all 31 of his extra point conversions. His 67 points tied for seventh in the NFL. The following season Walston had only 16 receptions for 279 yards and three touchdowns; starting only five games as a receiver. He made 33 or 34 extra point attempts, but was only used once as a field goal kicker that season. The Eagles were 7–5 and finished second in the NFL East Division.

The Eagles had a resurgence in the 1960 season, finishing the regular season 10–2 for first place in the NFL East, ahead of the second place Cleveland Browns. Walston's last-second field goal against the favored Browns in the season's fifth game gave the Eagles an upset victory, and instilled the confidence in the team that they could beat any team and win a championship. The field goal was beyond Walston's normal range for accuracy, the playing field was in poor condition, the wind was blowing off Lake Erie, and unlike more modern kickers Walston had played a full game as a position player (catching four passes for 94 yards at tight end). Eagles' general manager McNally said "'It was probably the greatest clutch kick I ever saw'".

During the 1960 season, Walston went 14 out of 20 in field goal kicking (70 percent) and led the NFL in field goal percentage for the second time. He also made 39 out of 40 in extra point conversions that season. He played tight end in 1960, and had 30 receptions for 563 yards and four touchdowns. His best game as a receiver came against the New York Giants, catching six passes for 119 yards. He was second in the NFL in points scored that season (105), behind only Paul Hornung. In his 10th NFL season, Walston was selected to play in the Pro Bowl for the first time.

The Eagles met the NFL West champion Green Bay Packers for the 1960 NFL championship. In his lone playoff appearance, Walston caught three passes for 38 yards while making a 15-yard field goal and two extra points as the Eagles won the 1960 NFL Championship Game, 17–13, their first title since 1949. Walston threw the key block on Ted Dean's game-winning touchdown run in the fourth quarter for the Eagles.

Walston made the Pro Bowl again in 1961. The Eagles were 10–4, but came in second place in the NFL East to the New York Giants. Walston had 34 receptions for 569 yards and two touchdowns. He had 14 field goals in 25 attempts and was 43 for 46 on extra point conversions. His 97 points were second best in the NFL that season, again behind the Packers' Paul Hornung.

After starting the 1962 season at tight end, Walston was replaced before the second game by Dick Lucas. When Pete Retzlaff suffered a broken arm at the end of September, Walston replaced him at wide receiver. Howard Cassady replaced Walton at wide receiver on October 28. Walston returned as the starting tight end on November 18, 1962, against the New York Giants, and suffered a broken arm (with Cassady suffering a broken leg in the same game). After breaking his arm, Walston remained the team's placekicker for the remaining four games, wearing a sling. He was only four of 15 in field goal attempts that year, but made 36 or 38 extra point conversions. This was his worst career field goal percentage, other than 1959 when he missed his only attempt. As a receiver, he started only five games that season, with four receptions. The Eagles finished the season last in the NFL East with a 3–10–1 record.

After the Eagles had earlier granted Walston's request to be made a free agent, Walston announced his retirement in early May 1963. During his 12-year Eagles' career Walston scored 881 points, and at the time of his retirement had scored more points in the NFL than anyone other than Lou Groza. He retained the Eagles' franchise points record until it was broken by kicker David Akers in 2007. Walston ranks third all-time on the Eagles in points scored, behind Akers and Jake Elliot (as of 2025).

Walston ranks second on the Eagles all-time in extra points made (365), behind only David Akers; and seventh all-time for the Eagles in made field goals (as of 2025). He ranks eighth all-time as an Eagles receiver in receptions (311) and yards receiving (5,363) (as of 2025). At the time he retired in 1962, he was 11th all-time in NFL history in receptions (311), receiving yards (5,363), and yards per reception (17.2).

== Legacy and honors ==
Walston was named by voters of the Pro Football Hall of Fame to the National Football League 1950s All-Decade Team. Walston is one of only four players named to that team not yet inducted in the Pro Football Hall of Fame. He was inducted into the Eagles Hall of Fame on September 22, 2019. In 2014, he was named to the Philadelphia Sports Hall of Fame. In September 2022, a group of present and former sportswriters for The Philadelphia Inquirer named Walston the 46th greatest Eagle in the team's history. In 2020, a writer for The Athletic named him the best Eagle ever to wear jersey No. 83, as did a writer for Sports Illustrated.

When Walston successfully fended off the challenge of faster receivers to remain a starter at Georgia in 1950, Georgia coach Wallace Butts said "'Bob has that important ability of getting open for a pass under any conditions . . . We have faster flankmen but none can fake his way clear for a pass as good as Walston'". Philadelphia Eagles' general manager Vince McNally (1949 to 1964) said Walston was the best draft pick he ever made in over 400 selections for the Eagles. When scouting Walston at a college game between Georgia and Maryland, he saw Walston participate in every play of the game, observing that while he was not the biggest player in the game, he was the best player in the game. Eagles' Hall of Fame receiver Tommy McDonald, who played with Walston from 1957 to 1962, said Walston was the team's best all-around athlete who could excel in a wide range of athletic endeavors beyond football. Hall of Fame writer Ray Didinger once called Walston the most underrated player in Eagles' history.

In 12 years with the Eagles, Walston never missed a regular season game (148), playoff game (1), or preseason game (70), and played with a broken jaw, broken finger, and broken arm during that streak. After Walston become a tight end at 6 ft (1.83 m) 190 lb (86 kg), he was much smaller than the defensive players he was required to block against. His Eagles' coach Buck Shaw said, "'He's not really big enough to do the job . . . But he'll do it anyway. He'll bite and scratch and fight at every turn, and he'll get it done'". His Eagles' teammates witnessed Walston play despite serious injuries (including a broken jaw, broken arm, and broken finger), and future Hall of Fame quarterback Norm Van Brocklin said of Walston "'He'll play until he's 60'".

== NFL career statistics ==
Year	Team	GP	Field Goals				Extra Points			Rec TD	Total Points
Year	Team	GP	FGM	FGA	FG%	Lng	XPM	XPA	XP%	Rec TD	Total Points
1951	PHI	12	6	11	54.5	44	28	31	90.3	8	94
1952	PHI	12	11	20	55.0	35	31	31	100.0	3	82
1953	PHI	12	4	13	30.8	27	45	48	93.8	5	87
1954	PHI	12	4	10	40.0	20	36	39	92.3	11	114
1955	PHI	12	2	3	66.7	25	6	7	85.7	3	30
1956	PHI	12	6	13	46.2	39	17	18	94.4	3	53
1957	PHI	12	9	12	75.0	35	20	21	95.2	1	53
1958	PHI	12	6	14	42.9	36	31	31	100.0	3	67
1959	PHI	12	0	1	0.0	0	33	34	97.1	3	51
1960	PHI	12	14	20	70.0	39	39	40	97.5	2	105
1961	PHI	14	14	25	56.0	42	43	46	93.5	0	97
1962	PHI	14	4	15	26.7	36	36	38	94.7	4	48
Total		148	80	157	51.0	44	365	384	95.1	46	881

== Coaching and executive career ==
=== Philadelphia Eagles and Miami Dolphins ===
After his playing career ended, Walston initially worked for the Eagles as a scout and in public relations. He worked as the Eagles' player personnel director for two years, and became their chief scout. In June 1966, he left the Eagles to become a pass receiving and kicking coach with the Miami Dolphins for their inaugural 1966 season, and stayed in that role with the Dolphins for the 1967 season.

=== Chicago Bears ===
In March 1968, Walston was hired by the Chicago Bears to replace Babe Dimancheff as director of player personnel, after Dimancheff was made an assistant coach. As player personnel director he was in charge of the annual NFL draft selection process for the Bears, and supervised college scouting for the Bears. In June 1971, the Bears made Walston an assistant to Bears' president George Halas Jr., in addition to his role as player personnel director. It is reported that he functioned as the equivalent of a general manager while holding the position as Halas's assistant, negotiating player salaries and making trades.

In mid-September 1974, the Bears hired Jim Finks as the team's new general manager, and to also hold the positions of executive vice-president and chief operating officer. In October 1974, Finks reportedly moved Walston from the personnel director to solely evaluating college players. It is also reported that Walston announced his resignation as player personnel director and assistant to Halas in early December 1974, stating it was in the Bears' best interest and that "I realize some of my previous services will fall under Finks' direction and I feel duplication of them will crowd the program". Walston reportedly stayed on in the role of a scout with the Bears, though by at least mid-1975 he was no longer scouting for the Bears.

=== Canadian Football League and World Football League ===
Walston later served as a scout for the Edmonton Eskimos in the Canadian Football League, from 1978 to 1980; and scouted for the United States Football League from 1983 to 1985.

== Personal life and death ==
Toward the very end of his career in 1962 and leading into 1963, Walston partnered in building an elaborate spa and health club in Cherry Hill, New Jersey. Over time he had other fitness centers in New Jersey. Walston worked as a deputy sheriff in Tattnall County, Georgia, and as athletic director of the Georgia State Prison. He also was certified as a deep sea diver. He operated a travel agency for two years, between the time he left the Chicago Bears and joined the Edmonton Eskimos.

Walston died of a heart attack at age 58, on October 7, 1987, at Alexian Brothers Medical Center, Elk Grove Village, Illinois.
