= 1962 St. Louis Cardinals (NFL) season =

American football team season

1962 St. Louis Cardinals season
- Head coach: Wally Lemm
- Home stadium: Busch Stadium (I)

Results
- Record: 4–9–1
- Division place: 6th NFL Eastern
- Playoffs: Did not qualify

The 1962 St. Louis Cardinals season marked the team's 43rd year with the National Football League (NFL) and their third season in St. Louis. The team finished with a record of 4 wins, 9 losses, and 1 tie — placing them 6th in the 7-team Eastern Conference.

This was the 14th consecutive year that the Cardinals failed to make the NFL playoffs.

== Offseason ==
=== Head coach ===
Wally Lemm, the head coach of the Houston Oilers, champions of the American Football League (AFL), was hired on February 22 and led the Cardinals for four years.

=== Hall of Fame Game ===
The Cardinals tied the New York Giants in the inaugural edition of the Hall of Fame Game in Canton, Ohio, held on Saturday, August 11, following the morning groundbreaking for the Pro Football Hall of Fame.

- New York Giants 21, St. Louis Cardinals 21

== Regular season ==
=== Schedule ===
| Week | Date | Opponent | Result | Record | Venue | Attendance | Recap | Sources |
|---|---|---|---|---|---|---|---|---|
| 1 | September 16 | at **Philadelphia Eagles** | **W** 27–21 | 1–0 | Franklin Field | 58,910 | Recap | |
| 2 | September 23 | at Green Bay Packers | **L** 0–17 | 1–1 | Milwaukee County Stadium | 44,885 | Recap | |
| 3 | September 30 | at **Washington Redskins** | **L** 14–24 | 1–2 | D.C. Stadium | 37,419 | Recap | |
| 4 | October 7 | **New York Giants** | **L** 14–31 | 1–3 | Busch Stadium | 20,327 | Recap | |
| 5 | October 14 | **Washington Redskins** | **T** 17–17 | 1–3–1 | Busch Stadium | 18,104 | Recap | |
| 6 | October 21 | **Cleveland Browns** | **L** 7–34 | 1–4–1 | Busch Stadium | 23,256 | Recap | |
| 7 | October 28 | at **Dallas Cowboys** | **W** 28–24 | 2–4–1 | Cotton Bowl | 16,027 | Recap | |
| 8 | November 4 | at **New York Giants** | **L** 28–31 | 2–5–1 | Yankee Stadium | 62,775 | Recap | |
| 9 | November 11 | **Pittsburgh Steelers** | **L** 17–26 | 2–6–1 | Busch Stadium | 20,264 | Recap | |
| 10 | November 18 | at **Cleveland Browns** | **L** 14–38 | 2–7–1 | Cleveland Municipal Stadium | 41,815 | Recap | |
| 11 | November 25 | San Francisco 49ers | **L** 17–24 | 2–8–1 | Busch Stadium | 17,532 | Recap | |
| 12 | December 2 | at **Pittsburgh Steelers** | **L** 7–19 | 2–9–1 | Forbes Field | 17,265 | Recap | |
| 13 | December 9 | **Dallas Cowboys** | **W** 52–20 | 3–9–1 | Busch Stadium | 14,102 | Recap | |
| 14 | December 16 | **Philadelphia Eagles** | **W** 45–35 | 4–9–1 | Busch Stadium | 14,989 | Recap | |
Note: Intra-conference opponents are in **bold** text.

== Standings ==
NFL Eastern Conference
| | W | L | T | PCT | CONF | PF | PA | STK |
|---|---|---|---|---|---|---|---|---|
| New York Giants | 12 | 2 | 0 | .857 | 10–2 | 398 | 283 | W9 |
| Pittsburgh Steelers | 9 | 5 | 0 | .643 | 8–4 | 312 | 363 | W3 |
| Cleveland Browns | 7 | 6 | 1 | .538 | 6–5–1 | 291 | 257 | W1 |
| Washington Redskins | 5 | 7 | 2 | .417 | 4–6–2 | 305 | 376 | L1 |
| Dallas Cowboys | 5 | 8 | 1 | .385 | 4–7–1 | 398 | 402 | L2 |
| St. Louis Cardinals | 4 | 9 | 1 | .308 | 4–7–1 | 287 | 361 | W2 |
| Philadelphia Eagles | 3 | 10 | 1 | .231 | 3–8–1 | 282 | 356 | L2 |

Note: Tie games were not officially counted in the standings until 1972.

== Personnel ==
=== Staff / Coaches ===
1962 St. Louis Cardinals staff
| Front office: Principal Owner/de facto General Manager - Bill Bidwill; Partial Owner / Team President - Charles Bidwill Jr.; Head coaches: Head Coach – Wally Lemm; Assistant Head Coach - Ray Willsey; Assistant Head Coach - Chuck Drulis; Assistant Head Coach - Ray Prochaska; Offensive coaches: Offensive Backs - Don Shroyer; Offensive Line – Ray Prochaska; Receivers Coach – Fran Polsfoot | Defensive coaches: Defensive Coordinator - Chuck Drulis |

=== Roster ===
1962 St. Louis Cardinals roster
| Quarterbacks (QB): 14 Sam Etcheverry P; 12 Charley Johnson; Running backs (RB): 35 Joe Childress; 44 John David Crow; 22 Prentice Gautt; 31 Mal Hammack; 33 Roland Jackson; Wide receivers (WR): 40 Bobby Joe Conrad; 81 Jack Elwell; 88 Sonny Randle; Tight ends (TE): 85 Taz Anderson; 87 Chuck Bryant; 86 Hugh McInnis | Offensive linemen (OL): 75 Ed Cook T; 61 Bob DeMarco C; 55 Irv Goode T; 64 Ken Gray G; 68 Mike McGee G; 73 Ernie McMillan T; 65 Tom Redmond G; Defensive linemen (DL): 72 Frank Fuller DT; 80 Ed Henke DE/MLB; 70 Don Owens DT; 78 Luke Owens DE; 79 Gerry Perry DE/K; 84 Joe Robb DE | Linebackers (LB): 51 Ted Bates OLB/MLB; 50 Garland Boyette MLB; 34 Bill Koman OLB; 52 Marion Rushing OLB; Defensive backs (DB): 37 Pat Fischer CB; 41 Jimmy Hill CB; 24 Billy Stacy CB; 38 Bill Triplett SS; 8 Larry Wilson FS; Special teams (ST): 25 Jim Bakken K | Reserve: 63 Fate Echols T (IR); 62 Dale Meinert LB (IR); Rookies in italics |

== Awards and records ==
=== Franchise records ===
- Sonny Randle, most pass receptions in one game (16)
- Sonny Randle, most receiving yards in one game (256)
- John David Crow, most touchdowns in one season (17)

=== Milestones ===
- Sonny Randle, 256 yards receiving on November 14
