= Billy Ray Barnes =

American football player and coach (1935–2025)

No. 33, 32
- Position: Halfback

Personal information
- Born: May 14, 1935; Landis, North Carolina, U.S.
- Died: December 31, 2025 (aged 90); Landis, North Carolina, U.S.
- Listed height: 5 ft 11 in (1.80 m)
- Listed weight: 201 lb (91 kg)

Career information
- High school: Landis
- College: Wake Forest (1953–1956)
- NFL draft: 1957: 2nd round, 19th overall pick

Career history

Playing
- Philadelphia Eagles (1957–1961); Washington Redskins (1962–1963); Minnesota Vikings (1965–1966)

Coaching
- Charleston Rockets (1968) Head coach; New Orleans Saints (1969–1970) Receivers coach; Atlanta Falcons (1971–1974) Offensive backs coach; New Orleans Saints (1975) Special teams coach

Awards and highlights
- NFL champion (1960); 3× Pro Bowl (1957–1959); First-team All-American (1956); ACC Player of the Year (1956); First-team All-ACC (1956); Second-team All-ACC (1955); College World Series champion (1955); Wake Forest Demon Deacons Jersey No. 33 retired

Career NFL statistics
- Rushing yards: 3,421
- Rushing average: 3.4
- Receptions: 153
- Receiving yards: 1,786
- Total touchdowns: 38
- Stats at Pro Football Reference

Head coaching record
- Regular season: COFL: 8–3–0 (.727)

Billy Ray Barnes (May 14, 1935 – December 31, 2025) was an American professional football player who was a halfback in the National Football League (NFL). He played college football and baseball for the Wake Forest Demon Deacons. He was a three-time Pro Bowl selection in the NFL. After his playing career, he became a coach.

== Early life ==
Barnes' sports career began in Landis where he was a three sport star (baseball, football and basketball) and led his 1952 football team to an undefeated season. The school's football stadium, now serving Corriher-Lipe Middle School, is named in his honor.

== College career ==
In the fall of 1953, Barnes enrolled at Wake Forest University.

Barnes made the freshman team in 1953 and the varsity team the following year. As a junior in 1955, he led the team in rushing, punt returns, kickoff returns, pass interceptions and pass receptions, setting the ACC record in pass receptions (31) and yards out of the backfield (349). After the 1955 football season ended, he joined the baseball team at third base where he hit .319, led the league in stolen bases (17) and helped Wake Forest win the 1955 National Baseball Championship.

In 1956, Barnes became the first player in the ACC to rush for more than 1,000 yards in a single season when he rushed for 1,010 yards. He was the second leading rusher in the nation, an All-American and 1956 ACC Player of the Year. In 2009, he was inducted into the ACC Football Championship Game Legends Class.

== Professional career ==
Barnes was drafted in the second round of the 1957 NFL draft by the Philadelphia Eagles. He made the Pro Bowl his first three years in the league (1957–1959) and was a key member of the backfield during the 1960 NFL Championship Game. During the title game against the Green Bay Packers, Barnes ran the ball 13 times for 42 yards. He had a nine-yard run and key 13-yard pass reception on the game-winning drive, and blocked Packer defensive end Bill Quinlan that helped Ted Dean to score the winning touchdown.

Following the 1961 season, Barnes was traded to the Washington Redskins for center Jim Schrader. He had two good seasons with the Redskins, leading the team in rushing in 1962. Barnes was cut by the Redskins before the start of the 1963 season because of an injury he sustained during the pre-season.

In 1965, Barnes returned to the Eagles as a free agent, but was traded to the Minnesota Vikings for a draft choice before the season began. Barnes retired following the 1966 season, and became head coach of the Continental Football League's Charleston Rockets in 1968. He eventually became an assistant coach in the NFL, and served as Norm Van Brocklin's backfield coach for the Atlanta Falcons.

Barnes was inducted into the Wake Forest University Hall of Fame in 1975 and the North Carolina Sports Hall of Fame in 1979.

== Death ==
Barnes died on December 31, 2025, at the age of 90.

== NFL career statistics ==
Legend
| | Won the NFL championship |
| **Bold** | Career high |

=== Regular season ===
| Year | Team | Games | | Rushing | | | | | Receiving | | | | |
| Year | Team | GP | GS | Att | Yds | Avg | Lng | TD | Rec | Yds | Avg | Lng | TD |
|---|---|---|---|---|---|---|---|---|---|---|---|---|---|
| 1957 | PHI | 12 | 12 | 143 | 529 | 3.7 | 41 | 1 | 19 | 212 | 11.2 | **67** | 1 |
| 1958 | PHI | 12 | 12 | 156 | 551 | 3.5 | **70** | **7** | **35** | **423** | 12.1 | 33 | 0 |
| 1959 | PHI | 12 | 12 | **181** | **687** | 3.8 | 61 | **7** | 32 | 314 | 9.8 | 47 | 2 |
| 1960 | PHI | 12 | 12 | 117 | 315 | 2.7 | 23 | 4 | 19 | 132 | 6.9 | 16 | 2 |
| 1961 | PHI | 12 | 8 | 92 | 309 | 3.4 | 43 | 1 | 15 | 194 | 12.9 | 59 | **3** |
| 1962 | WAS | 10 | 10 | 159 | 492 | 3.1 | 32 | 3 | 14 | 220 | 15.7 | 56 | 0 |
| 1963 | WAS | 12 | 5 | 93 | 374 | **4.0** | 19 | 5 | 15 | 256 | 17.1 | 54 | 1 |
| 1965 | MIN | 14 | 2 | 48 | 148 | 3.1 | 18 | 0 | 3 | 15 | 5.0 | 7 | 0 |
| 1966 | MIN | 2 | 1 | 5 | 16 | 3.2 | 4 | 1 | 1 | 20 | **20.0** | 20 | 0 |
| | | 98 | 74 | 994 | 3,421 | 3.4 | 70 | 29 | 153 | 1,786 | 11.7 | 67 | 9 |

=== Playoffs ===
| Year | Team | Games | | Rushing | | | | | Receiving | | | | |
| Year | Team | GP | GS | Att | Yds | Avg | Lng | TD | Rec | Yds | Avg | Lng | TD |
|---|---|---|---|---|---|---|---|---|---|---|---|---|---|
| 1960 | PHI | 1 | 1 | 13 | 42 | 3.2 | 7 | 0 | 1 | 13 | 13.0 | 13 | 0 |
| | | 1 | 1 | 13 | 42 | 3.2 | 7 | 0 | 1 | 13 | 13.0 | 13 | 0 |
