= Clarence Peaks =

American football player (1935–2007)

No. 26, 36
- Position: Fullback

Personal information
- Born: September 23, 1935; Greenville, Mississippi, U.S.
- Died: March 31, 2007 (aged 71); Voorhees Township, New Jersey, U.S.
- Listed height: 6 ft 1 in (1.85 m)
- Listed weight: 218 lb (99 kg)

Career information
- High school: Central (Flint, Michigan)
- College: Michigan State
- NFL draft: 1957: 1st round, 7th overall pick

Career history
- Philadelphia Eagles (1957–1963); Pittsburgh Steelers (1964–1965)

Awards and highlights
- NFL champion (1960); Second-team All-Big Ten (1956)

Career NFL statistics
- Rushing yards: 3,660
- Rushing average: 3.8
- Receptions: 190
- Receiving yards: 1,793
- Total touchdowns: 24
- Stats at Pro Football Reference

Clarence Earl Peaks (September 23, 1935 – March 31, 2007) was an American professional football fullback in the National Football League (NFL) for the Philadelphia Eagles and Pittsburgh Steelers. He played college football at Michigan State University and was selected in the first round (seventh overall) of the 1957 NFL draft.

== Early life ==
Peaks was born on September 13, 1935, in Greeneville, Mississippi. He attended Flint Central High School in Flint, Michigan. He starred in football, basketball and baseball in high school. He was an outstanding quarterback, and excelled in passing, rushing, and as a punter. He was team co-captain, made the All-Valley Football All-Star Team, and was honorable mention All-State at quarterback. He played football under coach Howard Auer.

As a baseball player, he batted in the cleanup position. As a basketball player, he was second on the team in scoring, and was voted team co-captain in 1953. In the same year, Peaks was voted Most Valuable Player, and was named an All-Valley guard.

== College career ==
Peaks attend Michigan State University (MSU). He played football under College Football Hall of Fame coach Duffy Daugherty. He played halfback, and also punted.

He had a 7.1 yards per attempt rushing average in 1954. In 1955, he rushed for 376 yards averaging 4.6 yards per carry.

Peaks was part of one of the most renowned plays in Rose Bowl history. The 1956 Rose Bowl (played on January 2, 1956) was between MSU and the University of California at Los Angeles Bruins (UCLA). UCLA was the reigning college football champion. MSU defeated UCLA 17–14.

MSU's quarterback was future NFL star Earl Morrall. During the Rose Bowl, Peaks took a lateral from Morall, and threw a 67-touchdown pass; the longest touchdown pass in Rose Bowl history at the time. Peaks also caught a 13-yard touchdown pass from Morrall in the game.

In 1956, Peaks was selected All-Big Ten and All-American. He was selected to the College All-Star Team in 1957. In 1961, returning to MSU to play in the traditional spring practice game between the current MSU team against recent alumni, Peaks won the Old Timers Player Award.

Peaks was among the favorites to win the 1956 Heisman Trophy, until he was injured.

== Professional career ==
The Philadelphia Eagles selected Peaks, 6 ft 1 in (1.85 m) and 218 pounds (98 kg), in the first round of the 1957 NFL draft (7th overall). He was selected immediately after the Cleveland Browns picked future NFL great Jim Brown (who became Peaks's friend). In the same draft, the Eagles also selected future hall of fame players Tommy McDonald (third round) and Sonny Jurgensen (fourth round).

He was having his best season for the Eagles in 1960, the year the Eagles were NFL champions, when he suffered a broken leg in the team's seventh game that ended his season. He had rushed for 465 yards, averaging 5.4 yards per attempt, and scored three touchdowns up to that point. In his final three years on the Eagles, he never averaged more than 3.5 yards per attempt. He did, however, have his two best seasons in total receptions in 1961 (32) and 1962 (39).

Before the 1964 season, the Eagles traded Peaks and Bob Harrison to the Pittsburgh Steelers for Bill “Red” Mack and Glenn Glass. In 1964, he had his best rushing average (4.3) since his 1960 injury. He played sparingly in 1965 for the Steelers, his final season.

Over his 9-year NFL career (7 with Philadelphia), he ran for 3,660 yards and 21 touchdowns. He also had 190 catches for 1,793 yards.

== NFL career statistics ==
Legend
	Won the NFL championship
**Bold**	Career high

Year	Team	Games		Rushing					Receiving				
Year	Team	GP	GS	Att	Yds	Avg	Lng	TD	Rec	Yds	Avg	Lng	TD
1957	PHI	12	12	125	495	4.0	35	1	11	99	9.0	**53**	0
1958	PHI	11	11	115	386	3.4	23	3	29	248	8.6	33	**2**
1959	PHI	12	6	124	451	3.6	34	3	28	209	7.5	23	0
1960	PHI	7	6	86	465	**5.4**	57	3	14	116	8.3	34	0
1961	PHI	13	11	135	471	3.5	33	**5**	32	**472**	**14.8**	48	0
1962	PHI	14	13	**137**	447	3.3	48	3	**39**	347	8.9	27	0
1963	PHI	14	6	64	212	3.3	26	1	22	167	7.6	23	1
1964	PIT	12	8	118	**503**	4.3	**70**	2	12	113	9.4	41	0
1965	PIT	10	5	47	230	4.9	36	0	3	22	7.3	21	0
Career		105	78	951	3,660	3.8	70	21	190	1,793	9.4	53	3

== Personal life ==
After his playing career, Peaks worked for General Electric and was a sportscaster. He worked for WHAT in Philadelphia for two years and WAMO in Pittsburgh for one. In 1969, he became the radio color commentator for Eagles games on WIP, and a television analyst for ABC. He became a financial consultant after his broadcasting career ended.

== Awards and honors ==
Peaks was inducted into the Greater Flint Area Sports Hall of Fame in 1981. He was inducted into the Greater Flint African American Sports Hall of Fame in 1991.

== Death ==
In 2007, Peaks died at the age of 71 in Voorhees, New Jersey. He was buried in Philadelphia.
