= Ronald Gibbs =

American football official (1900–1985)

Biographical details
- Born: June 29, 1900; Minneapolis, Minnesota, U.S.
- Died: March 12, 1985 (aged 84); Bradenton, Florida, U.S.
- Education: St. Thomas (MN)

Coaching career (HC unless noted)
- 1928: St. Thomas (MN)

Head coaching record
- Overall: 2–5–1

Ronald James Gibbs (June 29, 1900 – March 12, 1985) was an American football player, coach, and referee.

== Coaching career ==
Gibbs was a graduate of the University of St. Thomas in St. Paul, Minnesota. He served as the school's head football coach in 1928.

== Officiating career ==
Gibbs served as a college basketball and National Football League official. He officiated 15 NFL Championship games and three NCAA men's basketball tournament title games, including the 1950 title game.

=== 1958 NFL Championship Game ===
Gibbs was a referee in the 1958 NFL Championship Game, a contest commonly called "The Greatest Game ever Played". The Baltimore Colts defeated the New York Giants in sudden death overtime, 23–17.

During the fourth quarter of that game, Giants player Frank Gifford appeared to gain a first down, but Gibbs marked the ball short of the line to gain. For many years, Gifford maintained that Gibbs erred and, in doing so, cost the Giants the game. However, an analysis performed by ESPN in 2008 vindicated Gibbs' spot of the ball.

=== 1960 NFL Championship Game ===
Gibbs was also the referee for the 1960 NFL Championship Game, where the Philadelphia Eagles defeated the Green Bay Packers, 17–13, at Franklin Field. On the game's final play, Eagles two-way star Chuck Bednarik tackled Packers fullback Jim Taylor, with assistance from defensive back Bobby Jackson, at the Philadelphia 8-yard line.

It was the only championship game loss suffered by Packers coach Vince Lombardi, who led Green Bay to five NFL championships over the next seven seasons, as well as triumphs in Super Bowl I and Super Bowl II. The Eagles did not win another championship until Super Bowl LII following the 2017 season. After the game, Gibbs retired from the NFL.

=== Uniform ===
Gibbs wore uniform number 5 beginning in 1941, the first year officials wore numbers on their shirts. Since Gibbs' retirement, no referee has worn number 5, except when officials were numbered separately by position from 1979 to 1981. Cal Lepore, who wore number 72 from 1970 to 1978, wore number 5 in 1979 and 1980. Following Lepore's retirement after the 1980 AFC Championship Game, no referee wore number 5 in 1981.

== Head coaching record ==
Year	Team	Overall	Conference	Standing	Bowl/playoffs
St. Thomas Cadets (Minnesota Intercollegiate Athletic Conference) (1928)
1928	St. Thomas	2–5–1	1–3–1	T–8th	
St. Thomas:		2–5–1	1–3–1		
Total:		2–5–1			
