= Joe Robb =

American football player (1937–1987)

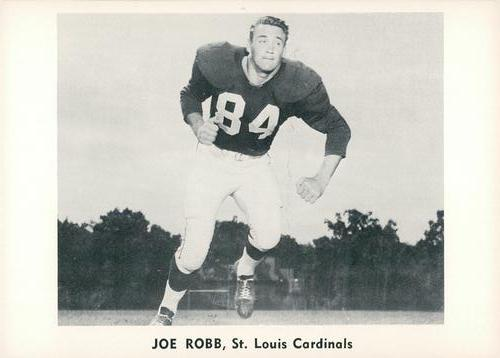
- Robb in 1961

No. 66, 84
- Positions: Defensive end, linebacker

Personal information
- Born: March 15, 1937; Lufkin, Texas, U.S.
- Died: April 18, 1987 (aged 50); Houston, Texas, U.S.
- Listed height: 6 ft 3 in (1.91 m)
- Listed weight: 238 lb (108 kg)

Career information
- High school: Lufkin
- College: TCU
- NFL draft: 1959: 14th round, 164th overall pick

Career history

Playing
- Philadelphia Eagles (1959–1960); St. Louis Cardinals (1961–1967); Detroit Lions (1968–1971); Houston Texans / Shreveport Steamer (1974)

Coaching
- Houston Texans / Shreveport Steamer (1974-1975) Defensive line coach

Awards and highlights
- NFL champion (1960); Pro Bowl (1966)

Career NFL statistics
- Fumble recoveries: 16
- Interceptions: 1
- Sacks: 39
- Stats at Pro Football Reference

Alvis Joe Robb (March 15, 1937 – April 18, 1987) was an American professional football player who was a defensive lineman in the National Football League (NFL) for the Philadelphia Eagles, St. Louis Cardinals, and the Detroit Lions. He played college football for the TCU Horned Frogs, appearing in two Cotton Bowls, and was selected in the 14th round of the 1959 NFL draft by the Chicago Bears. He went to one Pro Bowl during his 13-year career, and started on the defensive line for the Eagles in their 1960 NFL championship game victory over the Green Bay Packers.

== Early life ==
Robb was born on March 15, 1937, in Lufkin, Texas. His father had been a professional wrestler. He attended Lufkin High School, where he was a two-way player on the school's football team at offensive and defensive end. He suffered a broken nose during practice in September 1953, but continued to play in the school's games. In 1954, the 6 ft 3 in (1.91 m) 189 lb (85.7 kg) Robb led his team in pass receptions. Robb was selected first-team Class AAA All-State at end. He also was selected first-team All-District 4-AAA at defensive end, and second-team All-District 4-AAA at offensive end.

Robb played forward on the school's basketball team, where he was a leading scorer. In 1955, he was named second-team All-District 4-AAA in basketball, and third-team All-State Class AAA in basketball.

== College career ==
Robb attended Texas Christian University (TCU). He played on the TCU Horned Frogs football team, in the Southwest Conference, under head coach Abe Martin. The 208 lb (94.3 kg) Robb was one of the freshman football team's top linemen in 1955, playing right end. He set a record for receptions on the freshman team.

He played tackle on the varsity from 1956 to 1958. As a sophomore starter, he played in a hurricane against Texas A&M at Kyle Field, losing 7–6, their only Southwest Conference loss of the season. TCU went on to play in the Cotton Bowl that season, against Syracuse University and its legendary running back Jim Brown, often considered football's greatest player ever. TCU defeated Syracuse 28–27 in the January 1, 1957 Cotton Bowl.

TCU was 5–4–1 in Robb's junior season (1957). The highlight of TCU's season was an 18–14 victory over Ohio State University in TCU's second game of the year. Robb was part of an offensive unit in that game that did an excellent job blocking against Ohio State. It was Ohio State's only loss that year, in which they ended the season 9–1, won the Rose Bowl, and were ranked No. 2 in the Associated Press's final poll.

As a senior (1958), Robb was 6 ft 3.5 in (1.92 m) and 220 lb (99.8 kg). His nose already had been broken seven times when he began his senior season. One of his TCU teammates was Sherrill Headrick, a future All-Star linebacker in the American Football League (AFL). Among others, the team also included two linemen: All-American Don Floyd and future Pro Football Hall of Fame defensive tackle Bob Lilly.

The 1958 Horned Frogs had an 8–2 record during the regular season, winning the Southwest Conference title. They went to the Cotton Bowl for the second time in three years, playing against the United States Air Force Academy. The game ended in a 0–0 tie. The game was hard hitting, and Robb came out of the game after committing a personal found that resulted in a 15-yard penalty. TCU finished the season ranked 10th in the final Associated Press poll.

== Professional career ==
=== Philadelphia Eagles ===
The Chicago Bears selected Robb in the 14th round of the 1959 NFL draft (164th overall). The Bears waived Robb in September, a week before the season started, and he was acquired by the Philadelphia Eagles. Robb started 10 games at left defensive end for the Eagles in 1959 (in a 12-game season), and had one fumble recovery. He wore uniform No. 66 with the Eagles.

In 1960, the Eagles were NFL champions. Robb started eight games at left defensive end, and had one fumble recovery. He started at left defensive end in the 1960 NFL championship game against the Green Bay Packers, the Eagles winning, 17–13.

=== St. Louis Cardinals ===
Before the 1961 season, the Eagles traded Robb to the St. Louis Cardinals for defensive end Leo Sugar. During his first season with the Cardinals, Robb suffered a dislocated bone, which limited his ability to start during most of the season; though he was able to play on special teams. He still managed an interception, three fumble recoveries and one quarterback sack. In a November 5 game against the Dallas Cowboys, he intercepted an Eddie LeBaron pass that turned the game in the Cardinals favor. In a December 17 game against the Pittsburgh Steelers, Robb recovered a Bobby Layne fumble and handed the ball to teammate Billy Stacy who then ran for a touchdown.

In 1962, he started 12 games at left defensive end, with two fumble recoveries and 1.5 sacks. The Cardinals defense was 10th in the NFL in points allowed (361) and ninth in yards allowed (4,711), among 14 teams. He had a breakout season in 1963, starting all 14 Cardinals' games at left defensive end, with 8.5 sacks (second on the team to Luke Owens's 10.5). In a November 24, 1963 game against the New York Giants, with less than two minutes to go in the game, Robb sacked Hall of Fame quarterback Y. A. Tittle on a fourth down passing attempt from the Cardinals' 16-yard line to preserve a 24–17 Cardinals win. On the preceding play, Robb and defensive tackle Sam Silas had sacked Tittle. The Cardinals finished the season 9–5, their first winning season since 1960, and their best season winning percentage since 1948. The Cardinals defense improved to sixth best in points allowed (283) and fifth best in yards allowed (3,954).

The Cardinals were 9–3–2 in 1964. Robb started 13 games with one fumble recovery and one sack on the season. Robb suffered from injured and re-injured stomach muscles during the season. In 1965, he started all 14 games at left end, with 8.5 sacks and one fumble recovery. In a December 1965 game against the Cleveland Browns, Robb tried to clothesline running back Jim Brown early in the game, and Brown later threw an elbow at Robb just before halftime. A fight erupted and both Brown and Robb were ejected. Because this cost Brown an opportunity to win the NFL scoring title, "Robb was flooded with hate mail from Cleveland".

In 1966, Robb started all 14 games again, and had a career-high 9.5 sacks and a fumble recovery. He was selected to play in the Pro Bowl for the only time in his career. He was named second-team All-Pro by the Associated Press and the Newspaper Enterprise Association. The Cardinals' defense was first in the NFL in fewest yards allowed (3,492), and sixth in fewest points (265).

Robb's final season with the Cardinals was 1967. He was injured in a preseason game, and had knee surgery. He did not start until the fourth game of the 1967 season, against the Minnesota Vikings. He started 11 games that season, with only one sack.

Over his seven-year career in St. Louis, Robb started 82 games, with 31 sacks, eight fumble recoveries and one interception.

=== Detroit Lions ===
On June 25, 1968, the Cardinals traded Robb to the Detroit Lions for linebacker Ernie Clark. Robb went on to play his final four NFL seasons for the Lions. John Baker was the Lions' starting left defensive end in 1968, with Robb starting at right defensive end. Robb suffered ligament damage to his right knee in a November 10 game against the Baltimore Colts, that required surgery; and he missed the remainder of the season. He had 1.5 sacks and a fumble recovery in eight starts. The Lions finished the season with a 4–8–2 record.

Robb returned for the 1969 season, and started 14 games at left defensive end for the Lions, with two fumble recoveries and 4.5 sacks. The Lions had a 9–4–1 record that season. He had two sacks in an October 19 win against the Chicago Bears.

For the third time in four years, in 1970 Robb suffered a serious knee injury. Robb had started six games at left defensive end in 1970, when he suffered torn ligaments in his left knee during a game against the Chicago Bears on October 25. The injury required surgery and ended his regular season. He had one fumble recovery and one sack before his regular season ended. The Lions activated Robb on December 23, 1970, so he could be available to play as a backup to starter Jim Mitchell in the Lions' divisional round playoff game against the Dallas Cowboys on December 26; a 5–0 Cowboys win.

Robb started six games with the Lions in 1971, his final NFL season; with one sack. Jim Mitchell started the other eight games at left defensive end that season for the Lions. Lions' teammate Chuck Hughes died of a heart attack during the final minutes of an October 1971 game with the Bears. Robb was one of the pallbearers at Hughes funeral in San Antonio, which was attended by the entire Lions team.

Over his 13-year NFL career, Robb played in 159 games, starting 134, with 39 quarterback sacks, 16 fumble recoveries and one interception.

=== World Football League ===
After retiring from the NFL in 1971, Robb came out of retirement in 1974 at 37-years old to play for the Houston Texans of the World Football League (WFL). He was first approached by former AFL player Hoyle Granger about playing in the new league, and was later encouraged by his wife and twin daughters to play again. The team failed in Houston and moved to Shreveport, Louisiana during the 1974 season, becoming the Shreveport Steamer. He was an assistant coach with the Steamer in 1975, before the WFL folded on October 22, 1975.

== Legacy and honors ==
Robb earned a reputation as a "scrapper" in the NFL. He was smaller than most linemen, and he explained "because I was also so little, I had to defend myself". He once challenged 300 lb (136.1 kg) Hall of Fame offensive tackle Bob Brown to a fight, because Brown was the only player who hit him so quickly and hard when plays began.

In 1967, Lukfin honored Robb with a King for a Day celebration.

== Personal life and death ==
Robb moved to Houston in 1969 and lived there after retiring from football. He also had a residence in Lufkin. He went into the oil equipment business. Robb was also in a successful real estate partnership in Houston, and his wife was also in the real estate business in Houston. Robb died after a long illness at 50-years old, on April 18, 1987. He was survived by his wife Dru and their three children. He died in Houston and was buried in Lufkin. His pallbearers included teammates from high school, college and the NFL.
