= Howard Keys =

American football player (1935–1971)

No. 61
- Positions: Center, tackle, guard

Personal information
- Born: January 24, 1935; Orlando, Oklahoma, U.S.
- Died: October 21, 1971 (aged 36); Cleveland, Ohio, U.S.
- Listed height: 6 ft 4 in (1.93 m)
- Listed weight: 239 lb (108 kg)

Career information
- High school: Stillwater (Stillwater, Oklahoma)
- College: Oklahoma State (1955–1958)
- NFL draft: 1959: 12th round, 134th overall pick

Career history

Playing
- Philadelphia Eagles (1960–1964)

Coaching
- Calgary Stampeders (1965–1968) Assistant coach; Cleveland Browns (1969) Scout / Assistant Coach; Cleveland Browns (1970) Backfield coach; Cleveland Browns (1971) Offensive backs coach

Awards and highlights
- NFL champion (1960) later named the Super Bowl; Blue Grass Bowl Championship (1958); Philadelphia Sports Hall of Fame (2006); Jim Thorpe Athletic Award; Oil Bowl (Texas vs Oklahoma); Oklahoma All-State; Mr. Pioneer

Career NFL statistics
- Games played: 41
- Games started: 14
- Stats at Pro Football Reference

Howard Newton "Sonny" Keys (January 24, 1935 – October 21, 1971) was an American professional football offensive lineman in the National Football League (NFL) from 1960 to 1965 with the Philadelphia Eagles.

== Early life and college ==
Keys was born January 24, 1935, in Orlando, Oklahoma. He was a star athlete for the Pioneers at Stillwater High School in Stillwater, Oklahoma, where he played football, basketball, baseball, and track and field.

He attended Oklahoma State University, where he played college football for the Oklahoma State Cowboys. He was named to the Oklahoma All-State football team and played in the All Stars game and the Oil Bowl. His high school named Sonny "Mr. Pioneer." He played all positions on the line, including center. He went to college at Oklahoma State University in Stillwater. At OSU, he was part of the Cowboys championship Blue Grass Bowl game which was broadcast by Howard Cosell. Sonny is described as a "mauling defender" in OSU's Heritage Hall Museum in historic Gallagher-Iba Arena.

== Professional career ==
In the 1959 NFL draft, the Philadelphia Eagles selected Keys in the 12th round with the 134th overall pick.

Keys was part of Buck Shaw's 1960 NFL Championship season. He played five seasons with the Eagles and was known for knowing and playing every position on the offensive line. His family was featured in many local advertisements including Food Fair and a dairy distributorship. Keys' teammate, Tommy McDonald, cited a tough Sonny Keys in the book They Pay Me to Catch Footballs. He played five years for the Philadelphia Eagles.

In 1965, Keys joined Jerry Williams as an assistant coach of the Calgary Stampeders. After the Stampeders went to the Canadian Grey Cup, he chose to return to the NFL as an assistant coach with the Cleveland Browns under head coach Blanton Collier and later Nick Skorich.

== Death and legacy ==
Keys died in Cleveland on October 21, 1971, from complications of cancer. The Philadelphia Eagles dedicated their 1971 Christmas card to his memory.

As part of the 1960 Philadelphia Eagles championship team, Keys was inducted into the city of Philadelphia Sports Hall of Fame in 2006.
