= Gene Johnson (defensive back) =

American football player (1935–1997)

No. 27, 41
- Positions: Safety, cornerback

Personal information
- Born: September 18, 1935; Clay, West Virginia, U.S.
- Died: August 4, 1997 (aged 61); Montgomery, Ohio, U.S.
- Listed height: 6 ft 0 in (1.83 m)
- Listed weight: 187 lb (85 kg)

Career information
- High school: Charleston (Charleston, West Virginia)
- College: Cincinnati
- NFL draft: 1959: 9th round, 99th overall pick

Career history
- Philadelphia Eagles (1959–1960); Minnesota Vikings (1961); New York Giants (1961)

Awards and highlights
- NFL champion (1960)

Career NFL statistics
- Interceptions: 4
- Fumble recoveries: 1
- Stats at Pro Football Reference

Eugene Paul Johnson (September 18, 1935 – August 4, 1997) was an American professional football defensive back in the National Football League (NFL) for the Philadelphia Eagles, Minnesota Vikings, and New York Giants. He played college football at the University of Cincinnati and was selected 99th overall in the ninth round of the 1959 NFL draft.

Born in Clay, West Virginia, Johnson attended Charleston High School and played for the Cincinnati Bearcats football team.

Johnson spent his first two NFL seasons with the Eagles and was a member of their 1960 league championship team. That season he intercepted three passes in 11 games (three starts), which he split between the defensive halfback and safety positions.
