= Bobby Freeman (American football) =

American football player (1932–2003)

No. 18, 41, 20
- Position: Defensive back

Personal information
- Born: October 19, 1932; Birmingham, Alabama, U.S.
- Died: December 30, 2003 (aged 71); Auburn, Alabama, U.S.
- Listed height: 6 ft 1 in (1.85 m)
- Listed weight: 202 lb (92 kg)

Career information
- High school: Decatur (Decatur, Alabama)
- College: Auburn
- NFL draft: 1955: 3rd round, 37th overall pick

Career history
- Winnipeg Blue Bombers (1955)*; Cleveland Browns (1957–1958); Green Bay Packers (1959); Philadelphia Eagles (1960–1961); Washington Redskins (1962)
- * Offseason or practice squad member only

Awards and highlights
- NFL champion (1960)

Career NFL statistics
- Interceptions: 15
- Interception yards: 204
- Fumble recoveries: 3
- Stats at Pro Football Reference

Robert Clayton "Goose" Freeman (October 19, 1932 – December 30, 2003) was an American professional football defensive back in the National Football League (NFL) for the Cleveland Browns, Washington Redskins, Green Bay Packers, and Philadelphia Eagles. He played college football at Auburn University and was selected 37th overall in the third round of the 1955 NFL draft.

On January 8, 1955, quarterback Freeman signed his first pro contract with the Winnipeg Blue Bombers of the WIFU. It is estimated that the 2-year contract was worth $7,500 plus a signing bonus.

It is speculated that the contract signing resulted in Freeman dropping in the NFL draft held in late January 1955. He was selected in the third round of the draft by the Cleveland Browns. Shortly after the draft, Freeman signed his second pro contract with the Browns. It was reported that this contract was worth $12,000 per season plus a $2,000 signing bonus.

In July, Freeman was a show at the training camp of the Winnipeg Blue Bombers. Later that same month, Freeman reported to the camp of the Cleveland Browns. The Blue Bombers initiated legal action, which resulted in a temporary injunction that prevented Freeman from participating in the Browns camp pending a hearing.

The hearing was conducted by U.S. federal Judge Paul Jones. The Blue Bombers argued that they had a signed contract and a canceled cheque indicating that Freeman had accepted payment of his signing bonus. He suggested that the Winnipeg club used high-pressure tactics in their contract negotiations. The Cleveland Browns argued that they had no prior knowledge of the Winnipeg contract and that Freeman was ordered to remain in the U.S. by the military.

On August 15, 1955, Judge Paul Jones ruled in favour of the Winnipeg Blue Bombers. The Blue Bombers offered Freeman the opportunity to quarterback the team for the 1955 season under the terms of the original contract. Freeman countered by agreeing to play for Winnipeg if they offered him the same amount he agreed to with the Cleveland Browns. Coach Al Sherman turned down the Freeman request.

Freeman remained out of football for the balance of his contract with the Winnipeg Blue Bombers. In 1957, he signed with the Cleveland Browns, but he never did play quarterback.

Although he never played in Canada, Freeman's contract was a groundbreaking one. As a result of the ruling by Judge Paul Jones, Canadian football teams could sign contracts with American football players knowing that the contract would stand up in an American court of law.
