= Pete Retzlaff =

American football player and executive (1931–2020)

- Retzlaff with the Philadelphia Eagles

No. 25, 44
- Positions: Flanker, tight end

Personal information
- Born: August 21, 1931; Ellendale, North Dakota, U.S.
- Died: April 10, 2020 (aged 88); Pottstown, Pennsylvania, U.S.
- Listed height: 6 ft 1 in (1.85 m)
- Listed weight: 211 lb (96 kg)

Career information
- High school: Ellendale
- College: South Dakota State (1951–1952)
- NFL draft: 1953: 22nd round, 265th overall pick

Career history

Playing
- Detroit Lions (1953)*; Philadelphia Eagles (1956–1966)
- * Offseason or practice squad member only

Operations
- Philadelphia Eagles (1969–1972) General manager

Awards and highlights
- NFL champion (1960); 2× First-team All-Pro (1958, 1965); 2× Second-team All-Pro (1964, 1966); 5× Pro Bowl (1958, 1960, 1963–1965); NFL receptions co-leader (1958); Bert Bell Award (1965); Philadelphia Eagles Hall of Fame; Philadelphia Eagles No. 44 retired

Career NFL statistics
- Receptions: 452
- Receiving yards: 7,412
- Receiving touchdowns: 47
- Stats at Pro Football Reference
- Executive profile at Pro Football Reference

Palmer Edward "Pete" Retzlaff (August 21, 1931 – April 10, 2020), nicknamed "Pistol Pete" and "the Baron", was an American professional football player and executive for the Philadelphia Eagles of the National Football League (NFL). He played as a flanker and tight end for 11 seasons. After his playing career, he served as the general manager for four seasons. He was inducted into the Eagles Hall of Fame in 1989.

Retzlaff was an organizer and past president of the National Football League Players' Association (NFLPA), the union of players in the NFL.

== Early life ==
Retzlaff was born on August 21, 1931, in Ellendale, North Dakota. He starred on the football and track teams at Ellendale High School. He attended the North Dakota State Normal and Industrial School in Ellendale, before transferring to South Dakota State College (now South Dakota State University, SDSU).

In 1950, he entered SDSU, where he starred in track and field and football for two years, setting 16 school records in the 1951–52 and 1952-53 seasons.

In both football seasons he was selected to the All-North Central Conference (NCC) team. In 1951, as a fullback, he rushed for 1,016 yards, a school record, and in 1952 was named a Little All-American. Ironically, he never had a pass reception in his two years of football, the very skill that would make him a professional football star.

In 1953, he set school, NCC and National Association of Intercollegiate Athletics (NAIA) records in both shot put and discus. He was two-time NAIA national champion in shot put and in discus. In 1953, Retzlaff also won first place in shot put, discus, and high jump at the NCC Championships, and placed fourth in javelin. In the same year, he led SDSU to a national team title in track.

At SDSU, he made “Who's Who in American Colleges and Universities”, was a member the Senior Men's Honorary Society, and was vice president of the senior class.

In 1959, Ellendale held a Pete Retzlaff Day. In 1972, he was inducted into the South Dakota Sports Hall of Fame. In 1974, he was honored with a gold star on Ellendale's Walk of Fame. In the same year, he received the SDSU Distinguished Alumnus Award. In 1977, he was inducted into the SDSU Sports Hall of Fame.

== Professional football career ==
Retzlaff was selected in the 22nd round of the 1953 NFL draft by the Detroit Lions of the National Football League (NFL), but he did not make the team. After two years in the U.S. Army his contract was sold to the Philadelphia Eagles, and he was signed for $100. He played flanker and tight end for 11 seasons with the Eagles, having converted from fullback.

In 1958, Norm Van Brocklin, acquired from the Los Angeles Rams, suggested that Retzlaff should play split end, noting that he ran patterns like his favorite receiver at Los Angeles in Elroy Hirsch. That year, despite having never caught a pass in college, he tied Pro Football Hall of Fame receiver Raymond Berry for the league lead with 56 pass receptions. Fellow Eagles' Hall of Fame linebacker Maxie Baughan observed that Retzlaff was one of the first tight ends to be a receiver as well as a blocker. This changed football strategy as defenses now had provide for covering tight ends as another capable receiver on the field. Hall of Fame Dallas Cowboys' safety Mel Renfro found it difficult to cover Retzlaff because he was a great route runner.

Retzlaff was a co-captain on the 1960 Eagles team that won the NFL championship. Retzlaff led the team with 46 receptions, averaging 18 yards per catch. In 1965, Retzlaff had 66 receptions for 1,190 yards and 10 touchdowns, winning the Bert Bell Award for NFL player of the year in 1965. He played the entire season with an injury to his heels, saying he ended up with "21 holes" while using Novocain on gameday, and not practicing prior to the game.

Retzlaff had 452 catches for 7,412 yards in his 11-year Eagle career. He averaged 16.4 yards per catch and lost only four fumbles in his career. He was the seventh receiver with 450 catches in history. He went to the Pro Bowl five times. In 1965, he was named first-team All-Pro by the Associated Press (AP), United Press International (UPI) and Newspaper Enterprise Association (NEA), and second-team All-Pro by them in 1963 and 1965. The Sporting News named Retzlaff first-team All-Conference in 1958 and 1963-1965.

He was nicknamed "the Baron" by former teammate Tom Brookshier, and "Pistol Pete" by Bill Campbell, a legendary Philadelphia sportscaster who called the Eagles games.

He was one of the early leaders in forming the NFL Players Association (NFLPA), and became its president. In the late 1950s, Retzlaff, Van Brocklin and Kyle Rote led the Players Association in working with NFL Commissioner Bert Bell in beginning a player pension fund.

In 1989, he was inducted into the Eagles Hall of Fame. In 2005, he was named to the Professional Football Researchers Association Hall of Very Good in the association's third HOVG class.

== NFL career statistics ==
Legend
	Won the NFL championship
	Led the league
**Bold**	Career high

=== Regular season ===
Year	Team	Games		Receiving				
Year	Team	GP	GS	Rec	Yds	Avg	Lng	TD
1956	PHI	10	5	12	159	13.3	20	0
1957	PHI	12	7	10	120	12.0	28	0
1958	PHI	12	10	56	766	13.7	49	2
1959	PHI	10	8	34	595	17.5	45	1
1960	PHI	12	12	46	826	18.0	57	5
1961	PHI	14	14	50	769	15.4	61	8
1962	PHI	8	8	30	584	**19.5**	**84**	3
1963	PHI	14	14	57	895	15.7	46	4
1964	PHI	12	12	51	855	16.8	44	8
1965	PHI	14	14	**66**	**1,190**	18.0	78	**10**
1966	PHI	14	14	40	653	16.3	40	6
		132	118	452	7,412	16.4	84	47

=== Playoffs ===
Year	Team	Games		Receiving				
Year	Team	GP	GS	Rec	Yds	Avg	Lng	TD
1960	PHI	1	1	1	41	41.0	41	0
		1	1	1	41	41.0	41	0

== Post-football career ==
Retzlaff as President of the National Football League Players' Association in 1962.

After retiring from football, he worked as a sportscaster on a local Philadelphia CBS affiliate, WCAU. From 1969 to 1972, he was the Eagles' vice president and general manager. He drafted Harold Carmichael in 1971, who later passed him for catches and yards by an Eagle player. In 1973 and 1974, he worked as a color analyst for CBS doing NFL coverage.

== Honors ==
In addition to the honors listed above, Retzlaff is a member of the NAIA Hall of Fame as an athlete, and track and field. In 1965, he was honored in Philadelphia with “Pete Retzlaff” day, and was selected Pro Football Father of the Year by the Pro Football Hall of Fame. In the same year, he was named NFL Player of the Year by both the Maxwell Football Club (the Bert Bell Award) and the Washington Touchdown Club. In 1966, he won the John Wanamaker Athletic Award, which is given to individuals or entities that have "done the most to reflect credit upon Philadelphia and to the team or sport in which they excel."

Retzlaff's number 44 jersey has been retired by the Eagles. When he retired, he was the all-time leader for receptions and receiving yards for Philadelphia (on his death in 2020, he was still third in receptions and second in yards, having been passed in both by Harold Carmichael).

== Personal life and death ==
Retzlaff married his wife Patty in 1954, having four children, 10 grandchildren and 12 great-grandchildren at the time of his death. They had been married 66 years.

Retzlaff died on April 10, 2020, in Pottstown, Pennsylvania, at the age of 88.
