= Vince McNally =

American football executive (1902–1997)

Personal information
- Born: December 5, 1902; Philadelphia, Pennsylvania, U.S.
- Died: December 4, 1997 (aged 94); Berwyn, Pennsylvania, U.S.

Career information
- High school: Philadelphia (PA) Roman Catholic
- College: Notre Dame

Career history
- Philadelphia Eagles (1949–1964) General manager

Awards and highlights
- 2× NFL champion (1949, 1960)
- Executive profile at Pro Football Reference

Vince McNally (December 5, 1902 – December 4, 1997) was an American football executive who served as the general manager of the Philadelphia Eagles from 1949 to 1964.

He died on December 4, 1997, in Berwyn, Pennsylvania at age 94.
