= Gerry Perry =

American football player (1930–2022)

No. 70, 79
- Positions: Defensive end, defensive tackle, offensive tackle, guard, placekicker

Personal information
- Born: July 17, 1930; Ballston Spa, New York, U.S.
- Died: December 19, 2022 (aged 92); Torrance, California, U.S.
- Listed height: 6 ft 4 in (1.93 m)
- Listed weight: 250 lb (113 kg)

Career information
- High school: John C. Fremont (South Los Angeles, California)
- College: Pepperdine (1949); California (1951–1952)
- NFL draft: 1952: 29th round, 349th overall pick

Career history
- Detroit Lions (1953–1959); St. Louis Cardinals (1960–1962)

Awards and highlights
- NFL champion (1957)

Career NFL statistics
- Field goals made: 32
- Field goal attempts: 58
- Field goal %: 55.2
- Fumble recoveries: 4
- Stats at Pro Football Reference

Gerald Edward Perry (July 17, 1930 – December 19, 2022) was an American professional football player. A defensive lineman and placekicker, he played in the National Football League (NFL). Perry also played college football at University of California at Berkeley, and was selected in the 29th round of the 1952 NFL draft by the Los Angeles Rams.

Perry died in Torrance, California on December 19, 2022, at the age of 92.
