= Dick Lucas (American football) =

American football player (1934–2020)

No. 83, 87
- Positions: End, tight end

Personal information
- Born: January 9, 1934; South Boston, Massachusetts, U.S.
- Died: April 29, 2020 (aged 86); Philadelphia, Pennsylvania, U.S.
- Listed height: 6 ft 2 in (1.88 m)
- Listed weight: 213 lb (97 kg)

Career information
- High school: South Boston
- College: Boston College (1955)
- NFL draft: 1956: 10th round, 119th overall pick

Career history
- Quantico Marines (1956–1957); Pittsburgh Steelers (1958); Philadelphia Eagles (1960–1963)

Awards and highlights
- NFL champion (1960)

Career NFL statistics
- Receptions: 34
- Receiving yards: 384
- Touchdowns: 6
- Stats at Pro Football Reference

Dick Lucas (January 9, 1934 – April 29, 2020) was an American football player. He played college football at Boston College (1953–1955), military football for the Quantico Marines (1956–1957), and professional football for the Pittsburgh Steelers (1958) and Philadelphia Eagles (1960–1963). He died in April 2020, a victim of the COVID-19 pandemic.

== Early life ==
Lucas was born in Boston in 1934. He grew up in South Boston and attended South Boston High School. He was a star player in football, basketball, and baseball at South Boston High. In 1951, he was named to the all-conference and all-district teams and was selected by The Boston Globe as one of the city's two outstanding linemen.

== Boston College ==
He enrolled at Boston College where he played college football at the end position from 1953 to 1955. Coach Mike Holovak in November 1955 said of Lucas: "Lucas is a wonderful football player. Really great. Does everything well -- he blocks, he is a fine pass receiver, he is great on defense. And never opens his mouth. Just does a wonderful job every time he's in a football game."

Lucas received several honors while playing for Boston College. He won the school's Edward J. O'Melia Trophy in 1955 as the outstanding player in the annual Boston College–Holy Cross football rivalry game. He was also selected by The Boston Globe to its 1955 All-Northeastern football team. And Boston Mayor John Hynes declared December 13, 1955, as "Dick Lucas Day" in Boston.

== Military service and professional football ==
=== Quantico Marines ===
In January 1956, Lucas was selected by the Chicago Bears in the 10th round (117th overall pick) of the 1956 NFL draft. However, his professional football career was delayed by two years' service in the United States Marine Corps. He played on the Quantico Marines Devil Dogs football team in 1956 and 1957.

=== Pittsburgh Steelers ===
Lucas completed his military service in 1958. The Pittsburgh Steelers acquired rights to Lucas from the Bears in September 1958. Lucas appeared in four games for the 1958 Steelers, but a knee injury and surgery sidelined him for the remainder of the season. Lucas attempted a comeback with the Steelers in 1959, but he was cut in late September as the team reduced to the league's 35-player limit.

=== Philadelphia Eagles ===
Lucas signed with the Washington Redskins in February 1960. He was then traded by the Redskins to the Philadelphia Eagles in September 1960. Lucas played at the tight end position for the 1960 Philadelphia Eagles team, appearing in all 12 regular-season games principally as a blocker on punt and kickoff returns and as a tackler on kickoffs. The 1960 Eagles compiled a 10–2 record and defeated the Green Bay Packers in the NFL Championship Game. Lucas appeared in the first quarter of the championship game, but missed the rest of the game with a bruised knee. He received an NFL championship ring for his role on the 1960 Eagles.

Lucas returned to the Eagles in 1961, appearing in all 14 games with eight pass receptions, five of them resulting in touchdowns. He set a record for the most touchdowns in NFL history by a player with eight or fewer receptions in a year.

Lucas remained with the Eagles in 1962, appearing in nine games, including four as a starter. After being used sparingly in the first three games of the 1963 season, Lucas was released by the Eagles on October 1, 1963. Over the course of four seasons with the Eagles, Lucas appeared in 38 games, catching 34 passes for 384 yards and six touchdowns.

== Family and later years ==
Lucas married Barbara Dunn in 1961. They had three children: Brian, Karen, and Andrea.

After Lucas retired from football, he lived with his family in West Chester, Pennsylvania, a suburb of Philadelphia. He worked as a sales promotions manager for Merit Oil Company. He was also president of the Eagles Alumni Association.

Lucas died in April 2020, at age 86, of complications from COVID-19 during the COVID-19 pandemic in Philadelphia.
