= Riley Gunnels =

American football player (1937–2024)

No. 74, 61
- Positions: Defensive tackle, defensive end

Personal information
- Born: August 24,1937; Atlanta, Georgia, U.S.
- Died: December 9, 2024 (aged 87); Somers Point, New Jersey, U.S.
- Listed height: 6 ft 3 in (1.91 m)
- Listed weight: 253 lb (115 kg)

Career information
- High school: Calhoun (Calhoun, Georgia)
- College: Georgia
- NFL draft: 1959: 10th round, 115th overall pick

Career history
- Philadelphia Eagles (1960–1964); Pittsburgh Steelers (1965–1966); New York Giants (1968)*
- * Offseason or practice squad member only

Awards and highlights
- NFL champion (1960)

Career NFL statistics
- Fumble recoveries: 4
- Interceptions: 1
- Sacks: 18.5
- Stats at Pro Football Reference

John Riley Gunnels Jr. (August 24, 1937 – December 9, 2024) was an American professional football player who was a defensive end for seven seasons with the Philadelphia Eagles and Pittsburgh Steelers of the National Football League (NFL). He played his high school football in the late 1950s at Calhoun High School in Calhoun, Georgia, where he grew up. He played college football for the Georgia Bulldogs.

Gunnels died in South Jersey on December 9, 2024, at the age of 87.
