= Gene Gossage =

American football player (1935–2011)

No. 79, 63
- Positions: Defensive end, defensive tackle, guard

Personal information
- Born: February 17, 1935; Columbia, Tennessee, U.S.
- Died: May 1, 2011 (aged 76); Old Saybrook, Connecticut, U.S.
- Listed height: 6 ft 3 in (1.91 m)
- Listed weight: 240 lb (109 kg)

Career information
- High school: Wadsworth (Wadsworth, Ohio)
- College: Cincinnati (1954); Northwestern (1957-1959)
- NFL draft: 1958: 28th round, 328th overall pick
- AFL draft: 1960

Career history
- Philadelphia Eagles (1960–1962); New York Giants (1963)*; Hamilton Tiger-Cats (1963–1964)
- * Offseason or practice squad member only

Awards and highlights
- NFL champion (1960); Grey Cup champion (1963); Second-team All-American (1959); First-team All-Big Ten (1959)

Career NFL statistics
- Fumble recoveries: 1
- Sacks: 1
- Stats at Pro Football Reference

Ezra Eugene Gossage (February 17, 1935 – May 1, 2011) was an American professional football player who was a defensive lineman for the Hamilton Tiger-Cats of the Canadian Football League (CFL) and Philadelphia Eagles of the National Football League (NFL). He won the Grey Cup with the Tiger-Cats in 1963. He played college football for the Northwestern Wildcats and was selected in the 1958 NFL draft by the Eagles (Round 28, #328 overall). He died in 2011 at the age of 76.
