= Don Burroughs =

American football player (1931–2006)

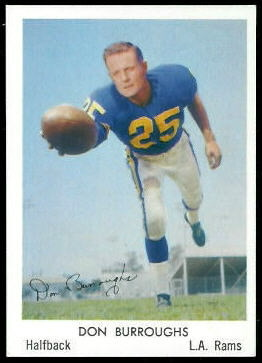
- Burroughs with the Los Angeles Rams in 1959

No. 25, 45
- Position: Safety

Personal information
- Born: August 19, 1931; Fillmore, California, U.S.
- Died: October 20, 2006 (aged 75); Ventura, California, U.S.
- Listed height: 6 ft 5 in (1.96 m)
- Listed weight: 190 lb (86 kg)

Career information
- High school: Fillmore
- College: Colorado A&M (1951–1952)
- NFL draft: 1953: undrafted

Career history
- Los Angeles Rams (1955–1959); Philadelphia Eagles (1960–1964)

Awards and highlights
- NFL champion (1960); 2× Second-team All-Pro (1960, 1961)

Career NFL statistics
- Interceptions: 50
- Fumble recoveries: 9
- Sacks: 6
- Stats at Pro Football Reference

Donald Edward Burroughs (August 19, 1931 – October 20, 2006), nicknamed "the Blade", was an American professional football player who was a defensive back in the National Football League (NFL) for the Los Angeles Rams and the Philadelphia Eagles. He played college football as a quarterback at Colorado A&M, now known as Colorado State University. Burroughs was notable for his 6 feet 5 inches (1.96 m) height, an anomaly at the safety position.

== Early life and college ==
Burroughs was born in Fillmore, California, as the only son of a family with four daughters.

Burroughs excelled in Ventura Country for Fillmore High School, being selected as an all-leaguer in football, basketball, and baseball. He spurned scholarship offers from places such as Notre Dame to try to avoid being "lost in the shuffle" among a big university. He played football first for Pasadena City College before moving to Ventura College, earning honors from the Western State Conference as an all-pro before he transferred to Colorado A&M. He was named All-Conference and All-American in his tenure there, where he played as a quarterback. In 1951, he threw for 1,279 yards, becoming the first quarterback in school history to pass for more than 1,000 yards in a season. He was preparing to sign with the Los Angeles Rams in 1953 as a free agent, but he was drafted to serve in the Army. Under the help of general manager Tex Schramm, Burroughs served in San Francisco, California, rather than in Korea, where he played football in the special services unit. He was named to the All-Army Football Team for 1953-1954 before being discharged in 1955. He was inducted into the Colorado State University Athletics Hall of Fame in 1990 along with the Ventura Country Sports Hall of Fame in 2006.

== Professional career ==
Due to a logjam of quarterbacks, he elected to switch positions to become a defensive back. His stature and frame earned him the nickname of "the Blade" from Rams quarterback Norm Van Brocklin. In his first season with the Rams, he played in all twelve games. In his first game as a professional on September 25 against the San Francisco 49ers, he picked off three passes off Y.A. Tittle (who threw five in total) in a 23–14 victory for the Rams. Burroughs would collect nine total interceptions in the season, returning them for 103 yards. The Rams won the Western Conference fourth time in the past seven seasons to reach the NFL Championship Game and face the defending champion Cleveland Browns. Burroughs picked off one pass from Otto Graham (who threw three on the day) and returned it 24 yards, but the Browns defeated the Rams 38–14.

The next year, Burroughs would only pick off two passes in twelve games, and the next year saw him start ten games and pick three passes off. 1958 proved slightly better, as he would record seven interceptions in twelve games (with one fumble and one fumble recovery), aided by a three-interception game on November 16 against the Green Bay Packers (quarterbacked by Babe Parilli). In 1959, he played in just ten games with six starts that resulted in no interceptions (with one fumble recovery). After the season, he was traded to the Philadelphia Eagles under the request of Van Brocklin, who had joined the Eagles the previous year.

He started ten games and recorded nine interceptions that season while recording one fumble recovery, which included two games with two interceptions. The Eagles finished as one of the best teams in the league and thus advanced to the 1960 NFL Championship Game against the Green Bay Packers on December 26. While he did not record a statistic, the Eagles won the game 17-13, earning Burroughs his first and only championship. He was named a Second Team All-Pro that season by three of the five selectors (the Associated Press and the Newspaper Enterprise Association, and the New York Daily News).

He recorded seven interceptions in both 1961 and 1962, and in the former year, he was second-team All Pro from the NEA, the Daily News, and the UPI. Burroughs recorded his third and final game with three interceptions on December 3, 1961, against the Pittsburgh Steelers (who used Bobby Layne, Rudy Bukich, and John Henry Johnson as quarterbacks). He recorded four interceptions in 1963 before closing out his career with two interceptions in 1964. His final interception came against the Pittsburgh Steelers on October 25.

He finished in the top ten for interceptions in five different seasons, finishing second in 1955, fifth in 1958, third in 1960, fifth in 1961, and third in 1962. At the time of the retirement of Burroughs, he was the seventh player to have recorded fifty interceptions in NFL history; in the prevailing half-century, he moved from tied for fifth best to 35th.

== Personal life ==
After his retirement at the age of 33, Burroughs ran a variety of businesses, which included a trucking company. With his wife Elaine, he had four children along with nine grandchildren. In 2006, Burroughs died of cancer at the age of 75.
