= Luke Owens =

American football player (1933–2016)

No. 72, 78
- Positions: Defensive end, defensive tackle, offensive tackle

Personal information
- Born: October 19, 1933; Stuttgart, Arkansas, U.S.
- Died: December 9, 2016 (aged 83); Cleveland, Ohio, U.S.
- Listed height: 6 ft 2 in (1.88 m)
- Listed weight: 254 lb (115 kg)

Career information
- High school: John Adams (Cleveland)
- College: Kent State (1953–1956)
- NFL draft: 1957: 3rd round, 32nd overall pick

Career history
- Baltimore Colts (1957); Chicago / St. Louis Cardinals (1958–1965)

Career NFL statistics
- Fumble recoveries: 6
- Safeties: 1
- Sacks: 38.5
- Stats at Pro Football Reference

Luke Owens (October 9, 1933 – December 9, 2016) was an American professional football defensive lineman in the NFL for the Baltimore Colts and the Chicago/St. Louis Cardinals. Owens played college football at Kent State University.
