= Jimmy Carr (gridiron football) =

American football player and coach (1933–2012)

No. 24, 91, 21
- Positions: Halfback, defensive back, linebacker

Personal information
- Born: March 25, 1933; Kayford, West Virginia, U.S.
- Died: August 13, 2012 (aged 79); Fishers, Indiana, U.S.
- Listed height: 6 ft 1 in (1.85 m)
- Listed weight: 206 lb (93 kg)

Career information
- High school: East Bank (WV)
- College: Charleston (WV) (1951–1954)
- NFL draft: 1955: undrafted

Career history

Playing
- Chicago Cardinals (1955–1957); Montreal Allouettes (1958); Philadelphia Eagles (1959–1963); Washington Redskins (1964–1965)

Coaching
- Minnesota Vikings (1966–1968) Defensive backs; Chicago Bears (1969) Defensive coordinator; Philadelphia Eagles (1970–1972) Defensive Coordinator; Chicago Bears (1973–1974) Defensive coordinator; Detroit Lions (1975–1976) Defensive coordinator; Buffalo Bills (1977) Linebackers; San Francisco 49ers (1978) Defensive backs; Minnesota Vikings (1979–1981) Defensive backs; Denver Gold (1983-1984) Assistant head coach; New England Patriots (1985–1989) Defensive backs; Atlanta Falcons (1990–1993) Defensive backs; Amsterdam Admirals (1995) Defensive coordinator; Ottawa Rough Riders (1996) Defensive backs; London Monarchs (1996) Assistant head coach; Scottish Claymores (1997) Defensive coordinator

Awards and highlights
- NFL champion (1960)

Career NFL statistics
- Rushing yards: 115
- Rushing average: 3.8
- Receptions: 9
- Receiving yards: 157
- Interceptions: 15
- Fumble recoveries: 11
- Total touchdowns: 1
- Stats at Pro Football Reference

James Henry Carr (March 25, 1933 – August 13, 2012) was an American professional football player who played nine seasons for the Chicago Cardinals, the Philadelphia Eagles and the Washington Redskins of the National Football League (NFL). Carr also played one season in the Canadian Football League (CFL) with the Montreal Alouettes in 1958. He was the starting left corner with the Philadelphia Eagles in 1960 when they won the World Championship beating the Green Bay Packers. He played college football at Morris Harvey (now the University of Charleston) in Charleston, West Virginia. While there he played in three bowl games and was one of three NAIA Hall of Fame inductees in 1962. He also played high school football and baseball at East Bank High School in East Bank, West Virginia.

Carr had been traded along with Sonny Jurgensen from the Eagles to the Redskins for Norm Snead and Claude Crabb on 31 March 1964. The transaction was part of a youth movement by recently appointed Eagles head coach and general manager Joe Kuharich, as both Snead and Crabb were age 24 at the time while Jurgensen and Carr were 29 and 31 respectively. The situation was the opposite for Washington which sacrificed youth for experience.

After retiring as a player, he served 24 seasons as an NFL assistant coach for the Minnesota Vikings, the Chicago Bears, the Philadelphia Eagles, the Detroit Lions, the Buffalo Bills, the San Francisco 49ers, the New England Patriots, and the Atlanta Falcons. He also coached two years in the United States Football League and three years in NFL Europe. In 1985, he coached in the Super Bowl on the defensive staff of the New England Patriots. Carr was known as a defensive innovator implementing nickel packages, seven defensive backs, eleven man fronts, zone blitz schemes and special zones well before they came into common practice. Coaches who learned under his tutelage include Fritz Shurmur, Jerry Glanville, Floyd Reese, and Bill Belichick.

Jimmy Carr died on August 13, 2012, at the age of 79. He became a born-again Christian at age 62. His wife Lila was vital to his faith and his career.
