= Ted Dean =

American football player (born 1938)

No. 35, 33
- Positions: Halfback, fullback

Personal information
- Born: March 24, 1938; Radnor, Pennsylvania, U.S.
- Listed height: 6 ft 2 in (1.88 m)
- Listed weight: 213 lb (97 kg)

Career information
- High school: Radnor
- College: Wichita State
- NFL draft: 1960: 4th round, 40th overall pick
- AFL draft: 1960: 2nd round

Career history
- Philadelphia Eagles (1960–1963); Minnesota Vikings (1964)

Awards and highlights
- NFL champion (1960); Pro Bowl (1961); NFL kickoff return yards leader (1960)

Career NFL statistics
- Rushing yards: 923
- Rushing average: 3.5
- Receptions: 51
- Receiving yards: 684
- Total touchdowns: 6
- Stats at Pro Football Reference

Theodore Curtis Dean (born February 25, 1938) is an American former professional football player who was a running back in the National Football League (NFL) for the Philadelphia Eagles and the Minnesota Vikings. Dean played college football at Wichita State University.

== Early life and education ==
Dean was born on February 25, 1938, in Radnor, Pennsylvania. He graduated from Radnor High School, where he earned all-state honors in football and track and was named to the National High School All-American team.

Dean played college football at Wichita State University, where he received Honorable Mention All American honors and earned All-Missouri Valley Conference accolades following his junior and senior seasons.

== National Football League ==
Dean was drafted by the Philadelphia Eagles in the fourth round (40th overall) of the 1960 NFL draft. In his rookie season, Dean led the NFL in kickoff returns and kickoff return yards gained. Dean's on-field success, which culminated in a game-winning touchdown for the Eagles in the 1960 NFL Championship Game, earned him a place in the 1961 Pro Bowl.

Following the 1960 season, Dean was hailed as an up-and-coming star. According to Ray Didinger, George Halas believed Dean was "going to become the best ever". However, Dean's football career was shortened by several injuries and his production never matched that of his rookie season. He was traded to the Minnesota Vikings prior to the 1964 NFL season, but only played in two games for the Vikings (his last two in the NFL) before an automobile accident caused further injuries.

== Post-NFL career ==
Following his NFL career, Dean became an educator in the Philadelphia area.
