= 1960 Dallas Cowboys season =

NFL team season (inaugural)

- Owner: Clint Murchison, Jr.
- General manager: Tex Schramm
- Head coach: Tom Landry
- Home stadium: Cotton Bowl

Results
- Record: 0–11–1
- Division place: 7th NFL Western
- Playoffs: Did not qualify
- Pro Bowlers: RE Jim Doran

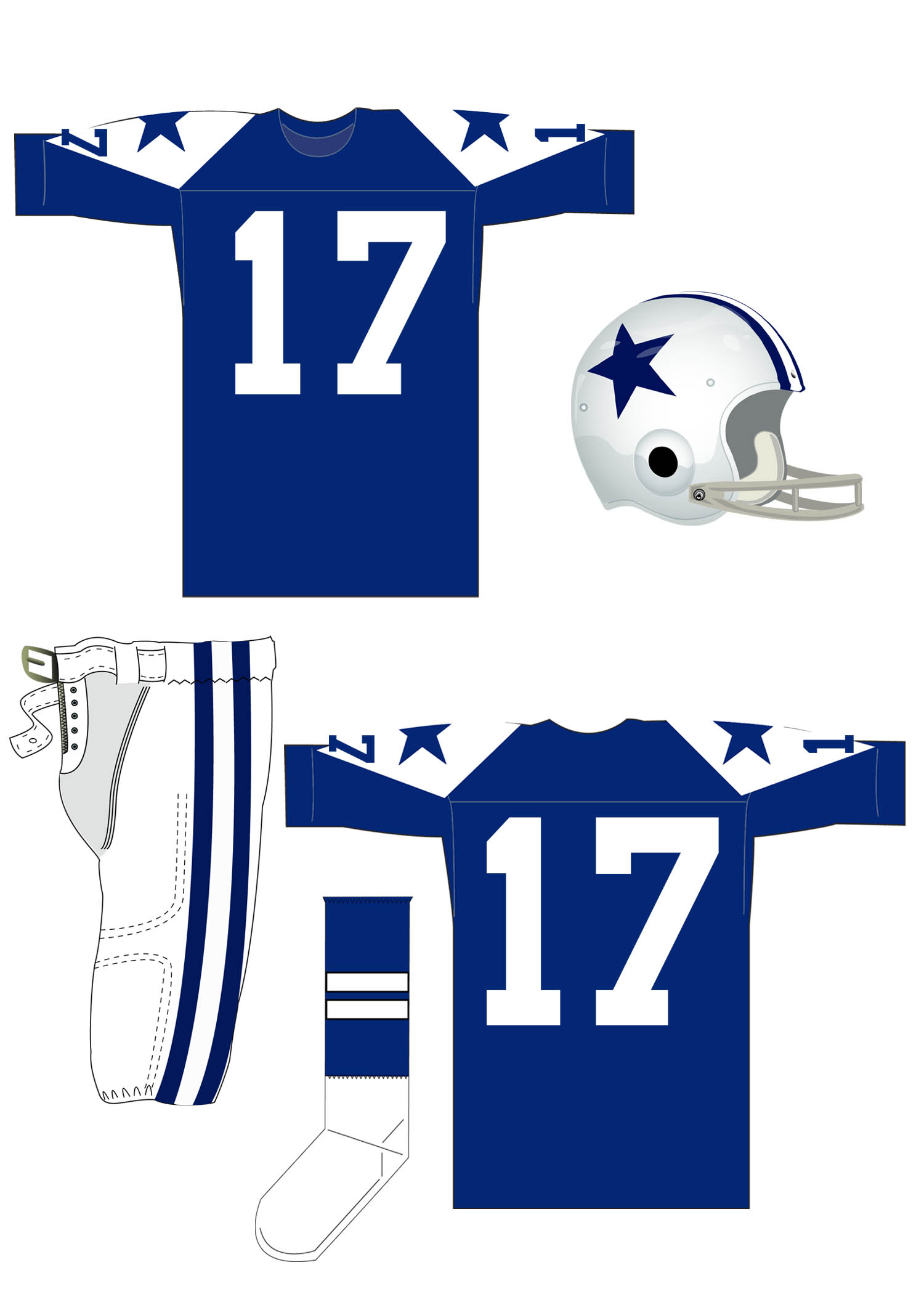
Cowboys blue uniform, 1960

The 1960 Dallas Cowboys season was the inaugural season for the franchise in the National Football League (NFL).

The Cowboys finished their first season with zero wins, 11 losses, and one tie, finishing last in the Western Conference and in the NFL for that season. Due to ties not counting as a half-win/half-loss at the time, the Cowboys became the first post-World War II team in NFL history to have a .000 winning percentage, being equaled since by the 1976 Buccaneers, 2008 Lions, and 2017 Browns.

Their record was also worse than Dallas' previous entry into the NFL, the original Dallas Texans, who finished 1–11 in their only season in Dallas in 1952 and folded after that season.

== Offseason ==
The NFL had no interest in expanding, but after Lamar Hunt started an American Football League franchise (the Dallas Texans), the NFL granted a franchise to Clint Murchison, Jr., and Bedford Wynne on January 28, 1960. As a footnote to this decision, when the NFL began considering expansion to Texas, the Washington Redskins founder and owner George Preston Marshall strongly opposed the move, as he had enjoyed a monopoly in the South for three decades (apart from the one-year appearance of the original Dallas Texans in 1952). Murchison bought the rights to their fight song Hail to the Redskins from a disgruntled Barnee Breeskin (the Redskins' team band leader) and threatened to prevent Marshall from playing it at games. Marshall eventually agreed to back Murchison's bid, receiving back the rights to the song.

The franchise hired former Los Angeles Rams executive Tex Schramm as their general manager. Tom Landry, an assistant coach with the New York Giants, was named head coach. Landry was offered the coaching job before the 1959 NFL Championship Game, with a five-year contract. The same day that Landry accepted the offer, it was reported by UPI that Landry would become coach of the AFL's Houston Oilers. Gil Brandt, who had served as a part-time scout for the Rams under Schramm, was named player personnel director. The day after the title game, Landry was announced as head coach of the proposed NFL team in Texas, a franchise that had yet to be awarded.

According to Schramm, the team's name was originally the "Dallas Steers", but then was changed to the "Dallas Rangers," which was the name of the minor league baseball team that was supposed to be disbanded. The franchise was admitted to the league too late to participate in the 1960 NFL college draft. However, majority owner Murchison signed two college players, quarterback Don Meredith from SMU, and running back Don Perkins from New Mexico, to personal services contracts before the draft (and before the franchise was voted into the league). The NFL honored these contracts after the franchise was voted in, although the Baltimore Colts drafted Perkins in the ninth round, and Meredith was also selected by the Chicago Bears in the third round after owner George Halas made the pick to help ensure that the expansion Cowboys got off to a solid start. The franchise was allowed to retain both players, but had to give their third-round and ninth-round choices in the 1962 NFL draft to the Bears and Colts, respectively.

On March 13, 1960, the franchise selected 36 players in an expansion draft. Each of the other 12 NFL teams were allowed to protect 25 players from their 36-man roster. The franchise was then given 24 hours to select three players from those unprotected by each other team.

The franchise was placed in the league's Western Conference. However, since they were the league's thirteenth franchise in addition to being an expansion franchise, it was decided that they would play every team in the league once, instead of playing each team in their conference twice, as the other teams did.

The Cowboys' final pre-season game on September 4 was played in rural northeastern Oregon; they lost 49–14 to the Los Angeles Rams at Pendleton's rodeo grounds.

=== Expansion draft ===
1960 NFL expansion draft — Dallas Cowboys
From	Player	Position	Experience		College	Notes
From	Player	Position	G	S	College	Notes
Baltimore Colts	L. G. Dupre	HB	48	5	Baylor	
Baltimore Colts	Ray Krouse *	DT	106	9	Maryland	
Baltimore Colts	Dave Sherer	P	12	1	Southern Methodist	
Chicago Bears	Don Healy	DT	24	2	Maryland	
Chicago Bears	Jack Johnson	HB	29	3	Miami (Florida)	
Chicago Bears	Pete Johnson	HB	7	1	Virginia Military Institute	
Cleveland Browns	Leroy Bolden	HB	23	2	Michigan State	
Cleveland Browns	Frank Clarke	E	36	3	Colorado	
Cleveland Browns	Ed Modzelewski	FB	66	6	Maryland	
Detroit Lions	Charlie Ane *	C	83	7	Southern California	
Detroit Lions	Gene Cronin	DE	48	4	Pacific	
Detroit Lions	Jim Doran *	E	89	9	Iowa State	
Green Bay Packers	Nate Borden	DE	57	5	Indiana	
Green Bay Packers	Bill Butler	S	11	1	Tennessee-Chattanooga	
Green Bay Packers	Don McIlhenny	HB	45	4	Southern Methodist	
Los Angeles Rams	Tom Franckhauser	DB	12	1	Purdue	
Los Angeles Rams	Bob Fry	T	60	5	Kentucky	
Los Angeles Rams	Duane Putnam *	G	95	9	Pacific	
New York Giants	Al Barry	G	48	4	Southern California	
New York Giants	Buzz Guy	G	22	2	Duke	
New York Giants	Don Heinrich	QB	43	6	Washington	
Philadelphia Eagles	Dick Bielski *	E	60	5	Maryland	
Philadelphia Eagles	Jerry DeLucca	T	12	1	Middle Tennessee State	
Philadelphia Eagles	Bill Striegel	LB	12	1	Pacific	
Pittsburgh Steelers	Ray Fisher	DT	12	1	Eastern Illinois	
Pittsburgh Steelers	Bobby Luna	HB	24	2	Alabama	
Pittsburgh Steelers	Ray Mathews *	DB	108	9	Clemson	
San Francisco 49ers	Fred Dugan	E	24	2	Dayton	
San Francisco 49ers	John Gonzaga	T	45	4	–	
San Francisco 49ers	Jerry Tubbs *	MLB	34	3	Oklahoma	
St. Louis Cardinals	Bobby Cross	T	83	7	Stephen F. Austin	
St. Louis Cardinals	Ed Husmann *	DT	52	5	Nebraska	
St. Louis Cardinals	Jack Patera	LB	57	5	Oregon	
Washington Redskins	Tom Braatz	LB	37	3	Marquette	
Washington Redskins	Joe Nicely	C	–	–	West Virginia	
Washington Redskins	Doyle Nix	S	31	3	Southern Methodist	
Made roster * Made Pro Bowl during career

=== Transactions ===
Other notable transactions prior to the season included acquiring quarterback Eddie LeBaron from the Washington Redskins, offensive end Billy Howton from the Cleveland Browns, and signing former San Francisco 49ers fullback Gene Babb. During training camp the team signed quite a few players who were released by other teams. Notable signings included center Mike Connelly, a rookie who was released by the Los Angeles Rams, and veteran Don Bishop, a defensive back who was released by the Chicago Bears.

=== Undrafted free agents ===
1960 undrafted free agents of note
Player	Position	College
Byron Bradfute	Tackle	Southern Miss
Jim Mooty	Safety	Arkansas
Gary Wisener	Safety	Baylor

=== Name change ===
The franchise used the nickname "Rangers" during its draft. But on March 19, after the baseball team owners reversed course, Murchison volunteered to rename his team to the Cowboys to avoid confusion with the American Association Dallas Rangers baseball team.

== Roster ==
Dallas Cowboys 1960 roster
Quarterbacks: 11 Don Heinrich; 14 Eddie LeBaron P; 17 Don Meredith; Running backs: 33 Gene Babb; 30 Mike Dowdle; 45 L. G. Dupre; 35 Walt Kowalczyk; 42 Don McIlhenny; Wide receivers: 82 Frank Clarke; 89 Fred Dugan; 81 Billy Howton; 23 Woodley Lewis; 25 Ray Mathews; Tight ends: 36 Dick Bielski; 83 Jim Doran	Offensive linemen: 77 Byron Bradfute T; 54 Mike Connelly C/G; 71 Paul Dickson T; 63 Mike Falls G; 75 Bob Fry T; 60 Buzz Guy G; 67 John Houser C; 79 Dick Klein T; 61 Duane Putnam G; Defensive linemen: 87 Nate Borden DE; 76 John Gonzaga DE; 62 Don Healy DT; 72 Bill Herchman DT; 66 Ed Husmann DT/DE	Linebackers: 51 Tom Braatz OLB; 85 Gene Cronin OLB; 52 Wayne Hansen OLB; 50 Jerry Tubbs MLB; Defensive backs: 20 Bob Bercich SS; 44 Don Bishop CB; 22 Bill Butler FS; 32 Tom Franckhauser CB; 24 Jim Mooty FS/CB; 84 Gary Wisener SS; Special teams: 31 Fred Cone K; 86 Dave Sherer P	Reserve lists: 73 Ray Fisher DT (IR); 56 Jack Patera LB (IR); 43 Don Perkins RB (IR); Rookies in italics 41 active, 3 inactive

== Regular season ==
=== Schedule ===
Week	Date	Opponent	Result	Record	Game Site	Attendance	Recap
1	September 24	Pittsburgh Steelers	**L** 28–35	0–1	Cotton Bowl	30,000	Recap
2	September 30	Philadelphia Eagles	**L** 25–27	0–2	Cotton Bowl	18,500	Recap
3	October 9	at Washington Redskins	**L** 14–26	0–3	Griffith Stadium	21,142	Recap
4	October 16	Cleveland Browns	**L** 7–48	0–4	Cotton Bowl	28,500	Recap
5	October 23	at St. Louis Cardinals	**L** 10–12	0–5	Busch Stadium	23,128	Recap
6	October 30	**Baltimore Colts**	**L** 7–45	0–6	Cotton Bowl	25,500	Recap
7	November 6	**Los Angeles Rams**	**L** 13–38	0–7	Cotton Bowl	16,000	Recap
8	November 13	at **Green Bay Packers**	**L** 7–41	0–8	City Stadium	32,294	Recap
9	November 20	**San Francisco 49ers**	**L** 14–26	0–9	Cotton Bowl	10,000	Recap
10	November 27	at **Chicago Bears**	**L** 7–17	0–10	Wrigley Field	39,951	Recap
11	December 4	at New York Giants	**T** 31–31	0–10–1	Yankee Stadium	55,033	Recap
12	December 11	at **Detroit Lions**	**L** 14–23	0–11–1	Briggs Stadium	43,272	Recap
13	Bye						

Conference opponents are in bold text

- Saturday night (September 24), Friday night (September 30)
- A bye week was necessary in 1960, as the league had an odd-number (13) of teams; one team was idle each week.
  The fourteenth team (Minnesota) joined the league in 1961 and the NFL initiated a 14-game regular season.

=== Game summaries ===
==== Week 1: vs. Pittsburgh Steelers ====
Week 1: Pittsburgh Steelers at Dallas Cowboys – Game summary

Quarter	1	2	3	4	Total
**Steelers**	7	7	14	7	**35**
Cowboys	14	7	7	0	**28**

at Cotton Bowl, Dallas, Texas

- Date: September 24
- Game weather: Cloudy, 72 °F (22 °C)
- Game attendance: 30,000
- Box score

Game information

**First quarter**

- DAL – Jim Doran 75-yard pass from Eddie LeBaron (Fred Cone kick). Cowboys 7–0.
- DAL – Fred Dugan 7-yard pass from Eddie Lebaron (Cone kick). Cowboys 14–0.
- PIT – Preston Carpenter 28-yard pass from Bobby Layne (Bobby Layne kick). Cowboys 14–7.

**Second quarter**

- DAL – Don McIlhenny 5-yard run (Fred Cone kick). Cowboys 21–7.
- PIT – Jimmy Orr 6-yard pass from Bobby Layne (Bobby Layne kick). Cowboys 21–14.

**Third quarter**

- PIT – Buddy Dial 70-yard pass from Tom Tracy (Bobby Layne kick). Tied 21–21.
- DAL – Jim Doran 54-yard pass from Eddie LeBaron (Fred Cone kick). Cowboys 28–21.
- PIT – Preston Carpenter 49-yard pass from Bobby Layne (Bobby Layne kick). Tied 28–28.

**Fourth quarter**

- PIT – Tom Tracy 65-yard pass from Bobby Layne (Bobby Layne kick). Steelers 35-28.

**Top passers**

- PIT – Bobby Layne – 16/25, 288 yards, 4 TD, INT
- DAL – Eddie LeBaron – 15/28, 345 yards, 3 TD, 3 INT

**Top rushers**

- PIT – Tom Tracy – 14 rushes, 64 yards
- DAL – Don McIlhenny – 10 rushes, 45 yards, TD

**Top receivers**

- PIT – Preston Carpenter – 5 receptions, 116 yards, 2 TD
- DAL – Jim Doran – 4 receptions, 154 yards, 2 TD

==== Week 2: vs. Philadelphia Eagles ====
Week 2: Philadelphia Eagles at Dallas Cowboys – Game summary

Quarter	1	2	3	4	Total
**Eagles**	3	10	0	14	**27**
Cowboys	3	3	6	13	**25**

at Cotton Bowl, Dallas, Texas

- Date: September 30
- Game time: 8:00 p.m. CST
- Game weather: Clear, 77 °F (25 °C)
- Game attendance: 18,500
- Box score

Game information

**First quarter**

- DAL – Fred Cone 32-yard field goal. Cowboys 3–0.
- PHI – Bobby Walston 21-yard field goal. Tied 3–3.

**Second quarter**

- PHI – Bobby Walston 27-yard field goal. Eagles 6–3.
- PHI – Tommy McDonald 16-yard pass from Norm Van Brocklin (Bobby Walston kick). Eagles 13–3.
- DAL – Fred Cone 45-yard field goal. Eagles 13–6.

**Third quarter**

- DAL – Frank Clarke 75-yard pass from Eddie LeBaron (kick failed). Eagles 13–12.

**Fourth quarter**

- PHI – Billy Ray Barnes 10-yard run (Bobby Walston kick). Eagles 20–12.
- DAL – Eddie LeBaron 1-yard run (kick failed). Eagles 20–18.
- PHI – Billy Ray Barnes 23-yard run (Bobby Walston kick). Eagles 27–18.
- DAL – Gene Babb 27-yard pass from Eddie LeBaron (Fred Cone kick). Eagles 27–25.

**Top passers**

- PHI – Norm Van Brocklin – 11/23, 139 yards, TD, 3 INT
- DAL – Eddie LeBaron – 10/29, 194 yards, 2 TD, 5 INT

**Top rushers**

- PHI – Clarence Peaks – 15 rushes, 68 yards
- DAL – Don McIlhenny – 15 rushes, 56 yards

**Top receivers**

- PHI – Pete Retzlaff – 5 receptions, 65 yards
- DAL – Frank Clarke – 1 reception, 75 yards, TD

==== Week 3: at Washington Redskins ====
Week 3: Dallas Cowboys at Washington Redskins – Game summary

Quarter	1	2	3	4	Total
Cowboys	0	7	0	7	**14**
**Redskins**	3	10	3	10	**26**

at Griffith Stadium, Washington, D.C.

- Date: October 9
- Game weather: Cloudy, 59 °F (15 °C)
- Game attendance: 21,142
- Box score

Game information

**First quarter**

- WAS – Robert Khayat 15-yard field goal. Redskins 3–0.

**Second quarter**

- DAL – Frank Clarke 32-yard pass from Eddie LeBaron (Fred Cone kick). Cowboys 7–3.
- WAS – Dick James 7-yard pass from Ralph Guglielmi (Robert Khayat kick). Redskins 10–7.
- WAS – Robert Khayat 29-yard field goal. Redskins 13–7.

**Third quarter**

- WAS – Robert Khayat 38-yard field goal. Redskins 16–7.

**Fourth quarter**

- WAS – Robert Khayat 10-yard field goal. Redskins 19–7.
- DAL – Dick Bielski 1-yard pass from Eddie LeBaron (Fred Cone kick). Redskins 19–14.
- WAS – Johnny Olszewski 1-yard run (Robert Khayat kick). Redskins 26–14.

**Top passers**

- DAL – Eddie LeBaron – 21/37, 296 yards, 2 TD, 3 INT
- WAS – Ralph Guglielmi – 10/16, 237 yards, TD, INT

**Top rushers**

- DAL – L. G. Dupre – 9 rushes, 25 yards
- WAS – Don Bosseler – 15 rushes, 71 yards

**Top receivers**

- DAL – Jim Doran – 7 receptions, 134 yards
- WAS – Jim Podoley – 3 receptions, 56 yards

==== Week 4: vs. Cleveland Browns ====
Week 4: Cleveland Browns at Dallas Cowboys – Game summary

Quarter	1	2	3	4	Total
**Browns**	7	21	14	6	**48**
Cowboys	0	0	0	7	**7**

at Cotton Bowl, Dallas, Texas

- Date: October 16
- Game time: 1:30 p.m. CST
- Game weather: Cloudy, 70 °F (21 °C)
- Game attendance: 28,500
- Box score

Game information

**First quarter**

- CLE – Bobby Mitchell 46-yard pass from Milt Plum (Sam Baker kick). Browns 7–0.

**Second quarter**

- CLE – Jim Brown 5-yard run (Sam Baker kick). Browns 14–0.
- CLE – Bobby Mitchell 30-yard run (Sam Baker kick). Browns 21–0.
- CLE – Larry Stephens 34-yard interception return (Sam Baker kick). Browns 28–0.

**Third quarter**

- CLE – Bobby Mitchell 90-yard kickoff return (Sam Baker kick). Browns 35–0.
- CLE – Gern Nagler 6-yard pass from Milt Plum (Sam Baker kick). Browns 42–0.

**Fourth quarter**

- CLE – Jamie Caleb 5-yard run (kick failed). Browns 48–0.
- DAL – Billy Howton 12-yard pass from Don Heinrich (Fred Cone kick). Browns 48–7.

**Top passers**

- CLE – Milt Plum – 6/8, 106 yards, 2 TD
- DAL – Don Heinrich – 6/15, 88 yards, TD, 2 INT

**Top rushers**

- CLE – Prentice Gautt – 12 rushes, 77 yards
- DAL – Don McIlhenny – 12 rushes, 43 yards

**Top receivers**

- CLE – Bobby Mitchell – 1 reception, 46 yards, TD
- DAL – Billy Howton – 2 receptions, 53 yards, TD

==== Week 5: at St. Louis Cardinals ====
Week 5: Dallas Cowboys at St. Louis Cardinals – Game summary

Quarter	1	2	3	4	Total
Cowboys	3	0	0	7	**10**
**Cardinals**	0	9	0	3	**12**

at Busch Stadium, St. Louis, Missouri

- Date: October 23
- Game weather: Sunny, 61 °F (16 °C)
- Game attendance: 23,128
- Box score

Game information

**First quarter**

- DAL – Fred Cone 25-yard field goal. Cowboys 3–0.

**Second quarter**

- STL – Eddie LeBaron tackled in own end zone by John Tracey. Cowboys 3–2.
- STL – John David Crow 9-yard run (Bobby Joe Conrad kick). Cardinals 9–3.

**Third quarter**

- No scoring plays

**Fourth quarter**

- DAL – L. G. Dupre 3-yard run (Fred Cone kick). Cowboys 10–9.
- STL – Gerry Perry 18-yard field goal. Cardinals 12–10.

**Top passers**

- DAL – Eddie LeBaron – 10/24, 173 yards, INT
- STL – John Roach – 3/14, 58 yards, INT

**Top rushers**

- DAL – L. G. Dupre – 15 rushes, 34 yards, TD
- STL – John David Crow – 24 rushes, 143 yards, TD

**Top receivers**

- DAL – Fred Dugan – 1 reception, 49 yards
- STL – Hugh McInnis – 1 reception, 36 yards

==== Week 6: vs. Baltimore Colts ====
Week 6: Baltimore Colts at Dallas Cowboys – Game summary

Quarter	1	2	3	4	Total
**Colts**	7	24	7	7	**45**
Cowboys	0	0	7	0	**7**

at Cotton Bowl, Dallas, Texas

- Date: October 30
- Game weather: Mostly sunny, 65 °F (18 °C)
- Game attendance: 25,500
- Box score

Game information

**First quarter**

- BAL – Raymond Berry 68-yard pass from Johnny Unitas (Steve Myhra kick). Colts 7–0.

**Second quarter**

- BAL – Raymond Berry 52-yard pass from Johnny Unitas (Steve Myhra kick). Colts 14–0.
- BAL – Steve Myhra 26-yard field goal. Colts 17–0.
- BAL – Raymond Berry 70-yard pass from Johnny Unitas (Steve Myhra kick). Colts 24–0.
- BAL – Lenny Moore 20-yard pass from Johnny Unitas (Steve Myhra kick). Colts 31–0.

**Third quarter**

- BAL – Billy Pricer 2-yard run (Steve Myhra kick). Colts 38–0.
- DAL – Billy Howton 5-yard pass from Don Heinrich (Fred Cone kick). Colts 38–7.

**Fourth quarter**

- BAL – Jerry Richardson 7-yard pass from Ray Brown (Steve Myhra kick). Colts 45–7.

**Top passers**

- BAL – Johnny Unitas – 8/16, 270 yards, 4 TD
- DAL – Don Meredith – 3/6, 54 yards, INT

**Top rushers**

- BAL – Billy Pricer – 14 rushes, 55 yards, TD
- DAL – L. G. Dupre – 10 rushes, 36 yards

**Top receivers**

- BAL – Raymond Berry – 4 receptions, 195 yards, 3 TD
- DAL – Fred Dugan – 4 receptions, 63 yards

==== Week 7: vs. Los Angeles Rams ====
Week 7: Los Angeles Rams at Dallas Cowboys – Game summary

Quarter	1	2	3	4	Total
**Rams**	10	14	7	7	**38**
Cowboys	3	10	0	0	**13**

at Cotton Bowl, Dallas, Texas

- Date: November 6
- Game weather: Sunny, 51 °F (11 °C)
- Game attendance: 16,000
- Box score

==== Week 8: at Green Bay Packers ====
Week 8: Dallas Cowboys at Green Bay Packers – Game summary

Quarter	1	2	3	4	Total
Cowboys	0	0	0	7	**7**
**Packers**	7	20	7	7	**41**

at City Stadium, Green Bay, Wisconsin

- Date: November 13
- Game weather: Partly cloudy, 42 °F (6 °C)
- Game attendance: 32,294
- Box score

==== Week 9: vs. San Francisco 49ers ====
Week 9: San Francisco 49ers at Dallas Cowboys – Game summary

Quarter	1	2	3	4	Total
**49ers**	3	3	3	17	**26**
Cowboys	0	7	0	7	**14**

at Cotton Bowl, Dallas, Texas

- Date: November 20
- Game weather: Partly cloudy, 57 °F (14 °C)
- Game attendance: 10,000
- Box score

==== Week 10: at Chicago Bears ====
Week 10: Dallas Cowboys at Chicago Bears – Game summary

Quarter	1	2	3	4	Total
Cowboys	0	0	7	0	**7**
**Bears**	7	7	0	3	**17**

at Wrigley Field, Chicago, Illinois

- Date: November 27
- Game weather: Rain, 54 °F (12 °C)
- Game attendance: 39,951
- Box score

Game information

**First quarter**

- CHI – Rick Casares 5-yard run (John Aveni kick). Bears 7–0.

**Second quarter**

- CHI – Johnny Morris 20-yard pass from Ed Brown (John Aveni kick). Bears 14–0.

**Third quarter**

- DAL – Don McIlhenny 64-yard pass from Don Heinrich (Fred Cone kick). Bears 14–7.

**Fourth quarter**

- CHI – John Aveni 20-yard field goal. Bears 17–7.

**Top passers**

- DAL – Don Heinrich – 10/25, 202 yards, TD
- CHI – Ed Brown – 8/17, 73 yards, TD, INT

**Top rushers**

- DAL – Don McIlhenny – 17 rushes, 34 yards
- CHI – Willie Galimore – 12 rushes, 89 yards

**Top receivers**

- DAL – Don McIlhenny – 2 receptions, 85 yards, TD
- CHI – Jim Dooley – 5 receptions, 40 yards

==== Week 11: at New York Giants ====
Week 11: Dallas Cowboys at New York Giants – Game summary

Quarter	1	2	3	4	Total
Cowboys	7	10	0	14	**31**
Giants	14	7	3	7	**31**

at Yankee Stadium, The Bronx, New York

- Date: December 4
- Game weather: Partly cloudy, 42 °F (6 °C)
- Game attendance: 55,033
- Box score

Game information

**First quarter**

- NYG – Mel Triplett 10-yard pass from George Shaw (Pat Summerall kick). Giants 7–0.
- NYG – Joe Morrison 1-yard run (Pat Summerall kick). Giants 14–0.
- DAL – L. G. Dupre 5-yard run (Fred Cone kick). Giants 14–7.

**Second quarter**

- NYG – Kyle Rote 28-yard pass from George Shaw (Pat Summerall kick). Giants 21–7.
- DAL – L. G. Dupre 21-yard pass from Eddie LeBaron (Fred Cone kick). Giants 21–14.
- DAL – Fred Cone 11-yard field goal. Giants 21–17.

**Third quarter**

- NYG – Pat Summerall 26-yard field goal. Giants 24–17.

**Fourth quarter**

- DAL – L. G. Dupre 23-yard pass from Eddie LeBaron (Fred Cone kick). Tied 24–24.
- NYG – Bob Schnelker 26-yard pass from Lee Grosscup (Pat Summerall kick). Giants 31–24.
- DAL – Billy Howton 11-yard pass from Eddie LeBaron (Fred Cone kick). Tied 31–31.

**Top passers**

- DAL – Eddie LeBaron – 17/35, 267 yards, 3 TD, 2 INT
- NYG – George Shaw – 8/16, 149 yards, 2 TD, INT

**Top rushers**

- DAL – Don McIlhenny – 8 rushes, 34 yards
- NYG – Ed Sutton – 7 rushes, 62 yards

**Top receivers**

- DAL – L. G. Dupre – 3 receptions, 82 yards, 2 TD
- NYG – Kyle Rote – 3 receptions, 69 yards, TD

==== Week 12: at Detroit Lions ====
Week 12: Dallas Cowboys at Detroit Lions – Game summary

Quarter	1	2	3	4	Total
Cowboys	0	7	0	7	**14**
**Lions**	0	16	7	0	**23**

at Briggs Stadium, Detroit, Michigan

- Date: December 11
- Game weather: Mostly sunny, 21 °F (−6 °C)
- Game attendance: 43,272
- Box score

== Standings ==
NFL Western Conference
	W	L	T	PCT	CONF	PF	PA	STK
Green Bay Packers	8	4	0	.667	7–4	332	209	W3
Detroit Lions	7	5	0	.583	7–4	239	212	W4
San Francisco 49ers	7	5	0	.583	7–4	208	205	W1
Baltimore Colts	6	6	0	.500	5–6	288	234	L4
Chicago Bears	5	6	1	.455	5–5–1	194	299	L3
Los Angeles Rams	4	7	1	.364	4–6–1	265	297	L1
Dallas Cowboys	0	11	1	.000	0–6	177	369	L1

Note: Tie games were not officially counted in the standings until 1972.

== See also ==
- 1960 NFL season
- 1960 NFL expansion draft

== Publications ==
- The Football Encyclopedia ISBN 0-312-11435-4
- Total Football ISBN 0-06-270170-3
- Cowboys Have Always Been My Heroes ISBN 0-446-51950-2
