= 1960 NFL expansion draft =

Selection of players by the Dallas Cowboys

General information
- Sport: American football
- Date: March 13, 1960

Overview
- League: NFL
- Expansion teams: Dallas Cowboys
- Expansion season: 1960

The 1960 NFL expansion draft was the first National Football League (NFL) draft in which a new expansion team, which eventually became known as the Dallas Cowboys, selected its initial players. The NFL awarded Dallas, Texas a franchise to compete for revenue with Lamar Hunt's Dallas Texans of the upstart American Football League. However, the Dallas expansion franchise was approved too late for it to participate in the 1960 NFL draft which had been held on November 30, 1959. Thus, Dallas is the only NFL expansion team to not have had the benefit of a college draft in its first year.

In order for the new franchise to become competitive, the league gave them the opportunity to select current players from existing teams. That selection was provided by an expansion draft, held on March 13, 1960. At the time the expansion draft was held, the team was known as the Dallas Rangers; the club was then renamed the Dallas Cowboys six days later to avoid confusion with the Dallas Rangers minor league baseball team.

In this expansion draft, Dallas chose 36 players from the existing 12 teams. The NFL also assigned the rights to 1960 NFL draft picks Don Meredith (who had been drafted by the Chicago Bears) and Don Perkins (drafted by the Baltimore Colts) to the Cowboys for a couple of future draft picks. 22 players made the active roster that season. 11 players played only one year with Dallas. Eight players (including Jack Patera, who was injured early in the 1961 season) played in 1960 and 1961. The three remaining players from the draft started for several years, including: Bob Fry, Tackle, 1960–64; Jerry Tubbs, Linebacker, 1960–66; and Frank Clarke, Wide Receiver, 1960–67.

== Rules of the draft ==
According to a post on the Professional Football Researcher's Association forum, details have never been released to the public, and thus the exact nature of the expansion draft is unclear. In his autobiography, Tom Landry stated, “Each team would be allowed to protect twenty-five of the thirty-four men on its roster. Of the nine remaining names, we could pick only three from each team.” However, there are at least two mistakes in that statement. First, the active roster limit at that time was thirty-six, not thirty-four. Second, there were at least two individuals chosen by Dallas who were not on active rosters at the time of the selections. Note in particular the selection of Joe Nicely, who was never on an NFL active roster. Thus, it would appear that teams could nominate players from their inactive rosters as well.

Mark Ribowsky: “The Cowboys were permitted to sign three players from each NFL team, choosing from among eleven players left unprotected from each thirty-six man roster in an expansion draft to be held in February.” Again, nothing is said here about players not on the active roster, and Ribowsky has the date wrong. Perhaps the best conclusion is that teams were allowed to protect twenty-five players, active or inactive, and Dallas could choose from the remainder.

More from Landry, “ . . . each time we picked a player off the unprotected list, a team could remove another from that list.”

== Player selections ==
1960 NFL expansion draft — Dallas Cowboys
From	Player	Position	Experience		College	Notes
From	Player	Position	G	S	College	Notes
Baltimore Colts	L. G. Dupre	HB	48	5	Baylor	
Baltimore Colts	Ray Krouse *	DT	106	9	Maryland	
Baltimore Colts	Dave Sherer	P	12	1	Southern Methodist	
Chicago Bears	Don Healy	DT	24	2	Maryland	
Chicago Bears	Jack Johnson	HB	29	3	Miami (Florida)	
Chicago Bears	Pete Johnson	HB	7	1	Virginia Military Institute	
Cleveland Browns	Leroy Bolden	HB	23	2	Michigan State	
Cleveland Browns	Frank Clarke	E	36	3	Colorado	
Cleveland Browns	Ed Modzelewski	FB	66	6	Maryland	
Detroit Lions	Charlie Ane *	C	83	7	Southern California	
Detroit Lions	Gene Cronin	DE	48	4	Pacific	
Detroit Lions	Jim Doran *	E	89	9	Iowa State	
Green Bay Packers	Nate Borden	DE	57	5	Indiana	
Green Bay Packers	Bill Butler	S	11	1	Tennessee-Chattanooga	
Green Bay Packers	Don McIlhenny	HB	45	4	Southern Methodist	
Los Angeles Rams	Tom Franckhauser	DB	12	1	Purdue	
Los Angeles Rams	Bob Fry	T	60	5	Kentucky	
Los Angeles Rams	Duane Putnam *	G	95	9	Pacific	
New York Giants	Al Barry	G	48	4	Southern California	
New York Giants	Buzz Guy	G	22	2	Duke	
New York Giants	Don Heinrich	QB	43	6	Washington	
Philadelphia Eagles	Dick Bielski *	E	60	5	Maryland	
Philadelphia Eagles	Jerry DeLucca	T	12	1	Middle Tennessee State	
Philadelphia Eagles	Bill Striegel	LB	12	1	Pacific	
Pittsburgh Steelers	Ray Fisher	DT	12	1	Eastern Illinois	
Pittsburgh Steelers	Bobby Luna	HB	24	2	Alabama	
Pittsburgh Steelers	Ray Mathews *	DB	108	9	Clemson	
San Francisco 49ers	Fred Dugan	E	24	2	Dayton	
San Francisco 49ers	John Gonzaga	T	45	4	–	
San Francisco 49ers	Jerry Tubbs *	MLB	34	3	Oklahoma	
St. Louis Cardinals	Bobby Cross	T	83	7	Stephen F. Austin	
St. Louis Cardinals	Ed Husmann *	DT	52	5	Nebraska	
St. Louis Cardinals	Jack Patera	LB	57	5	Oregon	
Washington Redskins	Tom Braatz	LB	37	3	Marquette	
Washington Redskins	Joe Nicely	C	–	–	West Virginia	
Washington Redskins	Doyle Nix	S	31	3	Southern Methodist	
Made roster * Made Pro Bowl during career

== See also ==
- 1960 American Football League draft
