= 1959 Cleveland Browns season =

NFL team season

- General manager: Paul Brown
- President: Dave R. Jones
- Head coach: Paul Brown
- Home stadium: Cleveland Stadium

Results
- Record: 7–5
- Division place: T–2nd NFL Eastern
- Playoffs: Did not qualify
- Pro Bowlers: Art Hunter, C Lou Groza, LT/K; Bob Gain, DE; Walt Michaels, LB; Jim Ray Smith, G Jim Brown, FB

The 1959 Cleveland Browns season marked the team's tenth year in the National Football League (NFL) and 14th season overall.

Future Hall of Fame running back Jim Brown rushed for 1,329 yards, leading the league for the third straight year, and 14 touchdowns. Quarterback Milt Plum, who was drafted by the Browns in the 1957 draft, made his mark at the position. The Browns had been looking for a replacement for Otto Graham ever since the Hall of Famer retired—for the second time—following the 1955 season. They finally found him when Plum, a second-round draft pick in 1957, threw for 14 touchdowns with just six interceptions. However, the Browns would finish just 7–5 in 1959, the second in what would turn out to be a string of six straight seasons in which the Browns had decent to very good teams without qualifying for the postseason. The 7–5 record was also the second worst record since head coach Paul Brown's tenure with the team.

== Preseason ==
Game	Date	Opponent	Result	Record	Venue	Attendance	Sources
1	August 11	at Pittsburgh Steelers	L 20–34	0–1	Forbes Field	27,432	
2	August 22	vs. Detroit Lions	L 3–9	0–2	Rubber Bowl (Akron, Ohio)	22,654	
3	August 30	at San Francisco 49ers	L 14–17	0–3	Kezar Stadium	24,737	
4	September 5	at Los Angeles Rams	W 27–24	1–3	LA Memorial Coliseum	55,883	
5	September 13	at Detroit Lions	L 28–31	1–4	Briggs Stadium	33,435	
6	September 19	Chicago Bears	W 33–31	2–4	Cleveland Stadium	25,316	
Note: September 19: Night game.

== Regular season ==
In 1959 the Browns offered seats at four price levels. Reserved seats were available at $4.50, $3.50, and $2.50, depending on location, and general admission seats were available for a league-low price of $1.50. Reserve season tickets for the six game home slate cost $27, $21, and $15, respectively.

Game	Date	Opponent	Result	Record	Venue	Attendance	Recap	Sources
1	September 26	at **Pittsburgh Steelers**	**L** 7–17	0–1	Forbes Field	33,844	Recap	
2	October 4	at **Chicago Cardinals**	**W** 34–7	1–1	Soldier Field	19,935	Recap	
3	October 11	**New York Giants**	**L** 6–10	1–2	Cleveland Stadium	65,534	Recap	
4	October 18	**Chicago Cardinals**	**W** 17–7	2–2	Cleveland Stadium	46,422	Recap	
5	October 25	**Washington Redskins**	**W** 34–7	3–2	Cleveland Stadium	42,732	Recap	
6	November 1	at Baltimore Colts	**W** 38–31	4–2	Memorial Stadium	57,557	Recap	
7	November 8	**Philadelphia Eagles**	**W** 28–7	5–2	Cleveland Stadium	58,275	Recap	
8	November 15	at **Washington Redskins**	**W** 31–17	6–2	Griffith Stadium	32,266	Recap	
9	November 22	**Pittsburgh Steelers**	**L** 20–21	6–3	Cleveland Stadium	68,563	Recap	
10	November 29	San Francisco 49ers	**L** 20–21	6–4	Cleveland Stadium	56,854	Recap	
11	December 6	at **New York Giants**	**L** 7–48	6–5	Yankee Stadium	68,436	Recap	
12	December 13	at **Philadelphia Eagles**	**W** 28–21	7–5	Franklin Field	45,952	Recap	
Note: Intra-division opponents are in **bold** text. Saturday night game: Sept. 26.

== Standings ==
Program for the November 29 game against the visiting San Francisco 49ers.

NFL Eastern Conference
	W	L	T	PCT	CONF	PF	PA	STK
New York Giants	10	2	0	.833	8–2	284	170	W4
Philadelphia Eagles	7	5	0	.583	6–4	268	278	L1
Cleveland Browns	7	5	0	.583	6–4	270	214	W1
Pittsburgh Steelers	6	5	1	.545	6–4	257	216	W1
Washington Redskins	3	9	0	.250	2–8	185	350	L5
Chicago Cardinals	2	10	0	.167	2–8	234	324	L6

Note: Tie games were not officially counted in the standings until 1972.

== Personnel ==
Team photo of the 1959 Cleveland Browns.

=== Roster ===
1959 Cleveland Browns roster
Quarterbacks: 16 Milt Plum; 18 Bob Ptacek; 15 Jim Ninowski; Running backs: 45 Leroy Bolden; 32 Jim Brown; 49 Bobby Mitchell; 36 Ed Modzelewski; 26 Ray Renfro; Receivers: 40 Preston Carpenter; 82 Frank Clarke; 86 Billy Howton; 88 Rich Kreitling	Offensive linemen: 77 Willie Davis T/DE; 76 Lou Groza T/K; 66 Gene Hickerson G; 56 Art Hunter C; 74 Mike McCormack T; 65 Chuck Noll G/OLB; 70 Fran O'Brien T; 64 Jim Ray Smith G; 60 John Wooten G; Defensive linemen: 79 Bob Gain DE; 78 Willie McClung DT; 73 Floyd Peters DT; 80 Dick Schafrath DE; 84 Paul Wiggin DE; 75 Sid Youngelman DT	Linebackers: 50 Vince Costello MLB; 35 Galen Fiss OLB; 52 Dave Lloyd MLB/C; 34 Walt Michaels OLB; Defensive backs: 22 Ken Konz S; 24 Warren Lahr S; 30 Bernie Parrish CB; 44 Jim Shofner CB/P; 42 Junior Wren S/P	Reserve list: Jim Wulff CB/S (Military); rookies in italics

=== Staff/coaches ===
1959 Cleveland Browns staff
Front office: Majority owner/CEO & president – Dave R. Jones; Minority owner/vice president – Ellis Ryan; Minority owner/vice president – Homer Marshman; Minority owner/vice president – Saul Silberman; Coaches: Head coach – Paul Brown; Assistant head coach – Dick Gallagher; Offensive coaches: Quarterbacks/running backs - Howard Brinker; Offensive guards – Fritz Heisler; Offensive tackles – Ed Ulinski; Offensive backfield and ends – Paul Bixler	Defensive coaches: Defensive line – Fritz Heisler & Ed Ulinski; Linebackers – Ed Ulinski; Strength & conditioning: Athletic trainer – Leo Murphy; Equipment manager – Morris Kono
