= 1959 Chicago Bears season =

NFL team season

- Head coach: George Halas
- Home stadium: Wrigley Field

Results
- Record: 8–4
- Division place: 2nd NFL Western
- Playoffs: Did not qualify

The 1959 season was the Chicago Bears' 40th in the National Football League. The team matched on their 8–4 record from 1958 under the coaching of George Halas, winning their last seven games.

== Preseason ==
Week	Date	Opponent	Result	Record	Venue	Attendance	Sources
1	August 15	at Green Bay Packers	W 19–16	1–0	Milwaukee County Stadium	28,286	
2	August 22	vs. Philadelphia Eagles	W 24–21	2–0	Manning Bowl (Lynn, MA)	17,000	
3	August 29	vs. Pittsburgh Steelers	W 54–17	3–0	Jeppeson Stadium (Houston)	28,000	
4	September 5	vs. Washington Redskins	W 52–14	4–0	Gator Bowl (Jacksonville, Florida)	28,245	
5	September 11	New York Giants	W 18–6	5–0	Soldier Field	43,385	
6	September 19	at Cleveland Browns	L 31–33	5–1	Cleveland Stadium	25,316	

== Regular season ==
Program for the October 18 game against the Baltimore Colts.

The Bears had only two seat prices for the 1959 season: box seats cost $5, while the grandstand — either upper or lower — was priced at $4 per ticket. No discount was given for the full six game home package, with listed prices of $30 and $24, respectively.

=== Schedule ===
Week	Date	Opponent	Result	Record	Venue	Attendance	Recap	Sources
1	September 27	at **Green Bay Packers**	**L** 6–9	0–1	City Stadium	32,150	Recap	
2	October 3	at **Baltimore Colts**	**W** 26–21	1–1	Memorial Stadium	57,557	Recap	
3	October 11	**Los Angeles Rams**	**L** 21–28	1–2	Wrigley Field	47,036	Recap	
4	October 18	**Baltimore Colts**	**L** 7–21	1–3	Wrigley Field	48,430	Recap	
5	October 25	at **San Francisco 49ers**	**L** 17–20	1–4	Kezar Stadium	59,045	Recap	
6	November 1	at **Los Angeles Rams**	**W** 26–21	2–4	L.A. Memorial Coliseum	77,943	Recap	
7	November 8	**Green Bay Packers**	**W** 28–17	3–4	Wrigley Field	46,205	Recap	
8	November 15	**San Francisco 49ers**	**W** 14–3	4–4	Wrigley Field	42,157	Recap	
9	November 22	at **Detroit Lions**	**W** 24–14	5–4	Briggs Stadium	54,059	Recap	
10	November 29	at Chicago Cardinals	**W** 31–7	6–4	Soldier Field	48,687	Recap	
11	December 6	Pittsburgh Steelers	**W** 27–21	7–4	Wrigley Field	41,476	Recap	
12	December 13	**Detroit Lions**	**W** 25–14	8–4	Wrigley Field	40,890	Recap	
Note: Intra-conference opponents are in **bold** text.

- October 3 was a Saturday night game.

== Standings ==
NFL Western Conference
	W	L	T	PCT	CONF	PF	PA	STK
Baltimore Colts	9	3	0	.750	9–1	374	251	W5
Chicago Bears	8	4	0	.667	6–4	252	196	W7
San Francisco 49ers	7	5	0	.583	5–5	255	237	L2
Green Bay Packers	7	5	0	.583	6–4	248	246	W4
Detroit Lions	3	8	1	.273	2–8	203	275	L1
Los Angeles Rams	2	10	0	.167	2–8	242	315	L8

Note: Tie games were not officially counted in the standings until 1972.

== Roster ==
Chicago Bears 1959 roster
Quarterbacks: 12 Zeke Bratkowski; 15 Ed Brown P; 14 Rudy Bukich; Running backs: 39 John Adams; 35 Rick Casares; 36 Merrill Douglas; 28 Willie Galimore; 47 Johnny Morris; Receivers: 88 Willard Dewveall; 43 Jim Dooley; 87 Harlon Hill; 83 Bill McColl; 32 Lionel Taylor	Offensive linemen: 50 John Damore C; 67 Abe Gibron G; 60 Don Healy G; 78 Stan Jones G; 79 Dick Klein T; 70 Herman Lee T; 76 John Mellekas C; Defensive linemen: 81 Doug Atkins DE; 73 Bill Bishop DT; 71 Earl Leggett DT; 72 Ed Nickla DT/DE; 75 Fred Williams DT	Linebackers: 31 Joe Fortunato OLB; 61 Bill George MLB; 33 Larry Morris OLB; 69 Bill Roehnelt OLB; Defensive backs: 24 Erich Barnes CB/S; 45 Don Bishop CB/S; 25 J. C. Caroline CB; 20 Pete Johnson S; 17 Richie Petitbon S/CB; 26 Charlie Sumner S; Special teams: 89 John Aveni K	Reserve: 54 Chuck Howley LB (IR); 49 Jack Johnson S (IR); 74 Bob Kilcullen G/T (Military); 55 Larry Strickland C (IR); 48 Vic Zucco CB (IR); Rookies in italics
