= 1959 San Francisco 49ers season =

American football team season

- Owner: Victor Morabito
- General manager: Louis Spadia
- Head coach: Red Hickey
- Home stadium: Kezar Stadium

Results
- Record: 7–5
- Division place: 3rd (tied) NFL Western
- Playoffs: Did not qualify

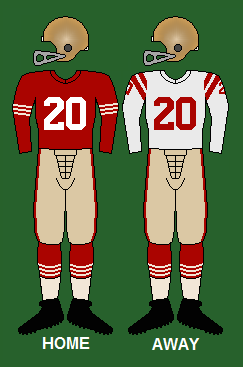
The uniform of the San Francisco 49ers, 1958-1959

The 1959 San Francisco 49ers season marked the team's 10th year in the NFL, their 13th overall, and their first with head coach Red Hickey.

After starting the season 6–1, they lost 4 out of their last 5 games and ended with a 7–5 record, missing the playoffs for the second straight year.

== Offseason ==
=== Draft ===
1959 San Francisco 49ers draft
Round	Pick	Player	Position	College	Notes
1	5	Dave Baker *	DB	Oklahoma	
1	8	Dan James	T	Ohio State	
2	17	Bob Harrison	LB	Oklahoma	
3	29	Eddie Dove *	DB	Colorado	
4	41	Monte Clark	T	USC	
5	54	Frank Geremia	T	Notre Dame	
6	66	Tony Bavaro	T	Holy Cross	
7	74	Don Rogers	C	South Carolina	
7	78	Daniel Colchico	DE	San Jose State	
8	90	Lew Aken	E	Vanderbilt	
9	102	Bobby Joe Green	P	Florida	
10	114	Bronko Nagurski Jr.	T	Notre Dame	Signed with Hamilton Tiger Cats (CFL)
11	126	Jack Hayes	B	Trinity (TX)	
12	138	Bill Korutz	C	Dayton	
13	150	Bill Lopasky	G	West Virginia	Made roster in 1961
14	162	Mike Dukes	LB	Clemson	
15	174	Joe Belland	B	Arizona State	
16	186	Bob Cook	B	Idaho State	
17	198	Jerome Jurczak	C	Benedictine	
18	210	Jack Cowley	T	Trinity (TX)	
19	222	Tom Osborne	WR	Hastings	
20	234	Toby Deese	T	Georgia Tech	
21	246	Luther Carr	B	Washington	
22	258	Burnio McQueen	E	North Carolina A&T	
23	270	Bruce Dollahan	T	Illinois	
24	282	Craig Chudy	E	UCLA	
25	294	Roy Gee	G	Trinity (TX)	
26	306	Ed Young	E	Louisville	
27	318	Mel Semenko	T	Colorado	
28	330	Mike McCluskey	B	Washington	
29	342	Jack Bolton	T	Puget Sound	
30	354	Bob Carter	T	Denver	
Made roster * Made at least one Pro Bowl during career

== Preseason ==
Week	Date	Opponent	Result	Record	Venue
1	August 16	Washington Redskins	W 27–24	1–0	Kezar Stadium
2	August 23	Green Bay Packers	L 17–24	1–1	Kezar Stadium
3	August 30	at Cleveland Browns	W 17–14	2–1	Cleveland Stadium
4	September 5	vs. Chicago Cardinals	L 24–27	2–2	Husky Stadium
5	September 12	at Los Angeles Rams	L 14–48	2–3	Los Angeles Memorial Coliseum
6	September 19	vs. New York Giants	L 13–17	2–4	Ute Stadium

== Schedule ==
For the 1959 season the 49ers offered seats on either a reserved or general admission basis. Reserved seats were priced at $3.75 for preseason games and $4.50 for the regular season, while general admission tickets were sold for $2.50 regardless of whether the game was preseason or regular. Reserved tickets for the full season were cost $27 plus 30 cents handling.

Week	Date	Opponent	Result	Record	Venue	Attendance	Sources
1	September 27	Philadelphia Eagles	**W** 24–14	1–0	Kezar Stadium	41,697	Recap
2	October 4	**Los Angeles Rams**	**W** 34–0	2–0	Kezar Stadium	56,028	Recap
3	October 11	at **Green Bay Packers**	**L** 20–21	2–1	City Stadium	32,150	Recap
4	October 18	at **Detroit Lions**	**W** 34–13	3–1	Briggs Stadium	52,585	Recap
5	October 25	**Chicago Bears**	**W** 20–17	4–1	Kezar Stadium	59,045	Recap
6	November 1	**Detroit Lions**	**W** 33–7	5–1	Kezar Stadium	59,064	Recap
7	November 8	at **Los Angeles Rams**	**W** 24–16	6–1	L.A. Memorial Coliseum	94,276	Recap
8	November 15	at **Chicago Bears**	**L** 3–14	6–2	Wrigley Field	42,157	Recap
9	November 22	at **Baltimore Colts**	**L** 14–45	6–3	Memorial Stadium	56,007	Recap
10	November 29	at Cleveland Browns	**W** 21–20	7–3	Cleveland Stadium	53,763	Recap
11	December 5	**Baltimore Colts**	**L** 14–34	7–4	Kezar Stadium	59,075	Recap
12	December 13	**Green Bay Packers**	**L** 14–36	7–5	Kezar Stadium	55,997	Recap
Note: Intra-conference opponents are in **bold** text.

== Standings ==
NFL Western Conference
	W	L	T	PCT	CONF	PF	PA	STK
Baltimore Colts	9	3	0	.750	9–1	374	251	W5
Chicago Bears	8	4	0	.667	6–4	252	196	W7
San Francisco 49ers	7	5	0	.583	5–5	255	237	L2
Green Bay Packers	7	5	0	.583	6–4	248	246	W4
Detroit Lions	3	8	1	.273	2–8	203	275	L1
Los Angeles Rams	2	10	0	.167	2–8	242	315	L8

Note: Tie games were not officially counted in the standings until 1972.

== Roster ==
=== Staff / Coaches ===
1959 San Francisco 49ers staff
Front office: Team Owner - Victor Morabito; General manager – Louis Spadia; Head coaches: Head coach - Frankie Albert; Offensive coaches: Chief of Offense / Offensive Coordinator - Red Hickey; Offensive Line – Bill Johnson	Defensive coaches: Defensive Assistant – Phil Bengtson; Special teams coaches: None - N/A

=== Players ===
1959 San Francisco 49ers roster
Quarterbacks: 12 John Brodie; 14 Y. A. Tittle; Running backs: 26 Lenny Lyles; 39 Hugh McElhenny; 34 Joe Perry; 28 C. R. Roberts; 24 J. D. Smith; Wide receivers: 88 Clyde Conner; 87 Fred Dugan; 47 Dicky Moegle; 27 R. C. Owens; 84 Billy Wilson	Offensive linemen: 53 Frank Morze C; 66 John Wittenborn G; 64 Ted Connolly G; 76 John Gonzaga; 78 John Thomas T; 79 Bob St. Clair T; 77 Bruce Bosley G; Defensive linemen: 63 Monte Clark DT; 75 Ed Henke DE; 72 Bill Herchman DT; 70 Charlie Krueger DE; 73 Leo Nomellini DT; 74 Henry Schmidt DT/DE	Linebackers: 54 Bob Harrison MLB; 55 Matt Hazeltine OLB; 33 Clancy Osborne OLB; 52 Karl Rubke OLB/C; 50 Jerry Tubbs MLB; Defensive backs: 25 Dave Baker S; 44 Eddie Dove S; 80 Jerry Mertens CB; 42 Jimmy Ridlon S/CB; 40 Abe Woodson CB; Special teams: 36 Tommy Davis K/P	Reserve lists: -- Dan James C (Left squad); 43 Jim Pace RB (IR); rookies in italics
