= Bob Bercich =

American football player (1936–2024)

No. 20
- Position: Safety

Personal information
- Born: November 9, 1936; Chicago, Illinois, U.S.
- Died: April 1, 2024 (aged 87); Mokena, Illinois, U.S.
- Listed height: 6 ft 1 in (1.85 m)
- Listed weight: 198 lb (90 kg)

Career information
- High school: Argo (Summit, Illinois)
- College: Michigan State
- NFL draft: 1959: 15th round, 179th overall pick
- AFL draft: 1960: 2nd round

Career history
- New York Giants (1960)*; Dallas Cowboys (1960–1961)
- * Offseason or practice squad member only

Career NFL statistics
- Interceptions: 5
- Stats at Pro Football Reference

Robert Edward Bercich (November 9, 1936 – April 1, 2024) was an American professional football player who was a safety in the National Football League (NFL) for the Dallas Cowboys. He played college football for the Michigan State Spartans.

== Early life ==
Bercich attended Argo Community High School, before moving on to Michigan State University. As a sophomore, he was moved between halfback and fullback. He became a starter at fullback as a junior and split time with Park Baker.

== Professional career ==
=== New York Giants ===
The New York Giants selected Bercich in the fifteenth round (179th overall) of the 1959 NFL draft with a future draft pick, which allowed the team to draft him before his college eligibility was over. He was also drafted by the Los Angeles Chargers in the second round of the 1960 AFL draft. He was released on September 5, 1960.

=== Dallas Cowboys ===
On September 8, 1960, he was claimed off waivers by the Dallas Cowboys. He became the first starter (6 starts) at strong safety in franchise history, while splitting time with Gary Wisener (3 starts) and Fred Doelling (3 starts). He finished with 46 tackles (19 solo), 2 interceptions and 11 passes defensed.

In 1961, he suffered a concussion during the seventh game against the New York Giants and did not play another contest in the season. The next year, he missed the pre-season with a knee injury and was released before the start of the 1962 season.

== Personal life and death ==
His son Pete Bercich played and coached in the NFL for the Minnesota Vikings. Bercich died on April 1, 2024, at the age of 87.
