= Don McIlhenny =

American football player (1934–2023)

No. 42, 35
- Position: Halfback

Personal information
- Born: November 22, 1934; Cleveland, Ohio, U.S.
- Died: April 18, 2023 (aged 88)
- Listed height: 6 ft 0 in (1.83 m)
- Listed weight: 197 lb (89 kg)

Career information
- High school: Hillsboro (Nashville, Tennessee)
- College: Southern Methodist
- NFL draft: 1956: 3rd round, 27th overall pick

Career history
- Detroit Lions (1956); Green Bay Packers (1957–1959); Dallas Cowboys (1960–1961); San Francisco 49ers (1961)

Awards and highlights
- SWC Sophomore of the Year (1953)

Career NFL statistics
- Rushing Yards: 1,581
- Rushing average: 3.8
- Receptions: 70
- Receiving yards: 655
- Total touchdowns: 14
- Stats at Pro Football Reference

Donald Brookes McIlhenny (November 22, 1934 – April 18, 2023) was an American professional football player who was a halfback in the National Football League (NFL) for the Detroit Lions, Green Bay Packers, Dallas Cowboys, and San Francisco 49ers. He played college football for the SMU Mustangs.

== Early life ==
McIlhenny attended Hillsboro High School in Nashville, Tennessee. He accepted a football scholarship from Southern Methodist University. As a junior, he was third on the Mustangs with 62 carries for 316 yards (5.1-yard avg.). As a senior, he led the team with 104 carries for 544 yards (5.2-yard avg.).

McIlhenny was a teammate of future Pro Football Hall of Famers Raymond Berry and Forrest Gregg.

=== Detroit Lions ===
McIlhenny was selected in the third round (27th overall) of the 1956 NFL draft by the Detroit Lions. As a rookie, he was the team's leading rusher during the first four games of the season, before injuries limited his productivity and finished with 372 rushing yards in 9 games.

On July 25, 1957, he was traded to the Green Bay Packers along with offensive tackles Ollie Spencer and Norm Masters, and offensive guard Jim Salsbury, in exchange for quarterback Tobin Rote and defensive back Val Joe Walker.

=== Green Bay Packers ===
The Green Bay Packers used him as a reserve halfback for 4 seasons. He led the team in rushing in 1957 with 100 carries for 384 yards and was fifth in the league in kickoff return average (25.9 yards).

=== Dallas Cowboys ===
McIlhenny was selected by the Dallas Cowboys in the 1960 NFL expansion draft, becoming the first starting halfback in franchise history. In the Cowboys 1960 inaugural season, he scored the first rushing touchdown for the Cowboys and was second on the team in rushing with 96 carries for 321 yards in 11 games (7 starts). He was waived on October 11, 1961.

=== San Francisco 49ers ===
McIlhenny was claimed off waivers by the San Francisco 49ers and played in 5 games during the 1961 season.

== Personal life and death ==
McIlhenny and his wife, who died in 2018, had four children. Their son Lance McIlhenny played for Southern Methodist University and is the winningest quarterback in school and Southwest Conference history.

McIlhenny died on April 18, 2023, at the age of 88, having suffered from Alzheimer's disease for ten years.
