= 1959 Chicago Cardinals season =

American football team season

- Owner: Violet Bidwill Wolfner
- Head coach: Pop Ivy
- Home stadium: Soldier Field & Metropolitan Stadium (Bloomington, Minnesota)

Results
- Record: 2–10
- Division place: 6th NFL Eastern
- Playoffs: Did not qualify

The 1959 Chicago Cardinals season was the franchise's 40th and last season in Chicago. The Cardinals opened the season with a 49–21 home win over the Washington Redskins at Soldier Field, but finished with a record of two wins and ten losses, last place in the Eastern Conference. They tied with the Los Angeles Rams for the worst record in the 12-team league.

Their final home game in Chicago was on November 29, a 31–7 loss to the cross-town rival Bears at Soldier Field. The home games of October 25 and November 22, both losses, were played in Minnesota at Metropolitan Stadium in Bloomington, the future home of the expansion Minnesota Vikings, starting two years later in 1961.

In March 1960, the Chicago Cardinals relocated to St. Louis and became the St. Louis Cardinals, bringing the NFL back to Missouri. After 28 seasons in St. Louis, they moved to the Phoenix area in Arizona prior to the 1988 season.

== Preseason ==
Week	Date	Opponent	Result	Record	Venue	Attendance	Sources
1	August 5	at Toronto Argonauts	W 55–26	1–0	Exhibition Stadium	27,152	
2	August 15	vs. Detroit Lions	L 19–21	1–1	Oklahoma Memorial Stadium	40,000	
3	August 22	vs. Pittsburgh Steelers	W 21–10	2–1	Texas Memorial Stadium	15,000	
4	August 28	at Los Angeles Rams	L 21–34	2–2	Los Angeles Memorial Coliseum	52,013	
5	September 5	vs. San Francisco 49ers	W 27–24	3–2	Husky Stadium	23,000	
6	September 11	vs. Pittsburgh Steelers	L 13–21	3–3	Busch Stadium	30,055	
7	September 20	vs. Baltimore Colts	W 31–17	4–3	Fairgrounds Stadium	16,671	

== Regular season ==
For the 1959 season the Cards offered seats in three price tiers. Field box and upper box tickets were $5.00, seats in the reserved grandstand cost $4.00, and bleacher seats were priced at $2.50. Season tickets for a four-game home slate at Soldier Field cost $18, $14, and $10, respectively. The club also offered a $10 "family plan," which admitted two children, age 14 or under, to every game with an adult season ticket purchase.

=== Schedule ===
Game	Date	Opponent	Result	Record	Venue	Attendance	Recap	Sources
1	September 27	**Washington Redskins**	**W** 49–21	1–0	Soldier Field	21,892	Recap	
2	October 4	**Cleveland Browns**	**L** 7–34	1–1	Soldier Field	19,935	Recap	
3	October 11	at **Washington Redskins**	**L** 14–23	1–2	Griffith Stadium	25,937	Recap	
4	October 18	at **Cleveland Browns**	**L** 7–17	1–3	Cleveland Stadium	46,422	Recap	
5	October 25	**Philadelphia Eagles**	**L** 24–28	1–4	Metropolitan Stadium	20,112	Recap	
6	November 1	**Pittsburgh Steelers**	**W** 45–24	2–4	Soldier Field	23,187	Recap	
7	November 8	at **New York Giants**	**L** 3–9	2–5	Yankee Stadium	56,779	Recap	
8	November 15	at **Philadelphia Eagles**	**L** 17–27	2–6	Franklin Field	28,887	Recap	
9	November 22	**New York Giants**	**L** 20–30	2–7	Metropolitan Stadium	26,625	Recap	
10	November 29	Chicago Bears	**L** 7–31	2–8	Soldier Field	48,687	Recap	
11	December 6	at Detroit Lions	**L** 21–45	2–9	Briggs Stadium	45,811	Recap	
12	December 13	at **Pittsburgh Steelers**	**L** 20–35	2–10	Forbes Field	19,011	Recap	
Note: Intra-division opponents are in **bold** text.

== Standings ==
NFL Eastern Conference
	W	L	T	PCT	CONF	PF	PA	STK
New York Giants	10	2	0	.833	8–2	284	170	W4
Philadelphia Eagles	7	5	0	.583	6–4	268	278	L1
Cleveland Browns	7	5	0	.583	6–4	270	214	W1
Pittsburgh Steelers	6	5	1	.545	6–4	257	216	W1
Washington Redskins	3	9	0	.250	2–8	185	350	L5
Chicago Cardinals	2	10	0	.167	2–8	234	324	L6

Note: Tie games were not officially counted in the standings until 1972.

== Personnel ==
=== Staff / Coaches ===
1959 Chicago Cardinals staff
Front office: Principal Owner – Violet Bidwill Wolfner; Managing Director – Walter Wolfner; Head coaches: Head Coach – Pop Ivy; Assistant Head Coach – Chuck Drulis; Assistant Head Coach – Ray Prochaska; Assistant Head Coach – Ray Willsey; Offensive coaches: Offensive Line – Ray Prochaska	Defensive coaches: Defensive Coordinator – Chuck Drulis; Defensive Backfield Coach – Ray Willsey

=== Roster ===
1959 Chicago Cardinals roster
Quarterbacks (QB): 16 King Hill; 17 M. C. Reynolds; Running backs (RB): 35 Joe Childress; 40 Bobby Joe Conrad K; 44 John David Crow; 22 Ken Hall; 31 Mal Hammack; 37 Larry Hickman; Wide receivers (WR): 20 Woodley Lewis; 88 Sonny Randle; 83 Perry Richards; Tight ends (TE)	Offensive linemen (OL): 75 Ed Cook G/T; 71 Bobby Cross T; 50 Don Gillis C; 64 Ken Gray G; 76 Mac Lewis T/C; 63 Dale Memmelaar T/G; 62 Dale Meinert G; 74 Ken Panfil T; Defensive linemen (DL): 73 Ed Culpepper DT; 72 Frank Fuller DT; 66 Ed Husmann DE/DT; 78 Luke Owens DE/DT; 86 Marion Rushing DE/OLB; 87 Maury Schleicher DE; 84 Leo Sugar DE	Linebackers (LB): 51 Ted Bates MLB; 57 Carl Brettschneider OLB; 53 Bill Koman OLB; 61 Jack Patera MLB; Defensive backs (DB): 41 Jimmy Hill CB; 81 Night Train Lane CB; 25 Jerry Norton S/P; 33 John Roach S/QB; 24 Billy Stacy S; 49 Jim Wagstaff S; Special teams (ST)	Reserve: -- Don Brown RB (IR); -- Joe Driskill CB (IR); 49 Fred Glick CB/S (IR); -- Tom Redmond DT (IR); 80 John Tracey WR (IR); Rookies in italics
