= Gene Babb =

American football player (1934–2018)

No. 32, 33
- Positions: Linebacker, fullback

Personal information
- Born: December 27, 1934; El Paso, Texas, U.S.
- Died: December 2, 2018 (aged 83); Oklahoma City, Oklahoma, U.S.
- Listed height: 6 ft 3 in (1.91 m)
- Listed weight: 216 lb (98 kg)

Career information
- High school: Odessa (Odessa, Texas)
- College: Austin
- NFL draft: 1957: 19th round, 224th overall pick

Career history
- San Francisco 49ers (1957–1958); Dallas Cowboys (1960–1961); Houston Oilers (1962–1963)

Career NFL/AFL statistics
- Rushing yards: 461
- Rushing average: 3
- Receptions: 33
- Receiving yards: 281
- Total touchdowns: 5
- Interceptions: 4
- Fumble recoveries: 2
- Stats at Pro Football Reference

Gene Walter Babb (December 27, 1934 – December 2, 2018) was an American football fullback and linebacker in the National Football League (NFL) for the San Francisco 49ers and Dallas Cowboys. He also was a member of the Houston Oilers in the American Football League (AFL). He played college football at Austin College.

== Early life ==
Babb attended Odessa High School before moving on to the University of Texas. He later transferred to Austin College. Besides playing football, he also was a Golden Gloves boxer in college.

In 1969, he was inducted into the Austin College Hall of Honor. The school also recognized him by creating the annual "Gene Babb Award" for the outstanding football player.
He is survived by his wife of 58 years, Gerry Reed Babb; daughter, Tracy Babb Frazier and her husband Steve Frazier; his brother, Fred Babb. He loved his dogs throughout his life.

== Personal life ==
Babb was an administrator for National Football Scouting Inc. He was the director of National Invitational Combine for twenty-three years until his retirement. He trained and developed numerous NFL clubs. He also served as director of NFL Films and first director of Alumni at Austin College. In 1969, he was inducted into Austin College's Athletic Hall of Honor.

== Professional career ==
=== San Francisco 49ers ===
Babb was selected by the San Francisco 49ers in the nineteenth round (224th overall) of the 1957 NFL draft. As a rookie, he was a key reserve player at fullback, rushing for 330 yards and 3 touchdowns.

In July 1960, he was traded to the Dallas Cowboys in exchange for a fifth-round draft choice (#58-Clark Miller).

=== Dallas Cowboys ===
Babb was primarily a reserve fullback, starting in five games during the Dallas Cowboys 1960 inaugural season, while being used both as a runner and pass receiver.

The next year, he was switched to linebacker and started 9 games at outside linebacker until being passed on the depth chart by Mike Dowdle. He was released on August 27, 1962.

=== Houston Oilers ===
In 1962, he signed with the Houston Oilers of the American Football League as a free agent, where he was a backup at middle linebacker for two seasons.
