= 1959 Washington Redskins season =

NFL team season

- Owner: George Preston Marshall
- General manager: Dick McCann
- Head coach: Mike Nixon
- Home stadium: Griffith Stadium

Results
- Record: 3–9
- Division place: 5th NFL Eastern
- Playoffs: Did not qualify

The 1959 Washington Redskins season was the franchise's 28th season in the National Football League (NFL). The team failed to improve on their 4–7–1 record from 1958 and finished 3–9.

The Redskins continued their ongoing strategy of establishing themselves as dominant NFL franchise for the Southern United States, licensing television broadcast of their games to a network of 40 stations spread across Virginia, the Carolinas, Tennessee, Georgia, Alabama, Mississippi, and Florida. They also licensed radio broadcasts of their games to a network of 94 stations across the aforementioned eight states, as well as Maryland, West Virginia, Kentucky, Arkansas, and Louisiana.

The team also continued their "Days for Dixie" halftime shows, which highlighted two Southern states each year, marking "Georgia Day" on October 18 and "North Carolina Day" on December 6. Each of these dates featured a guest marching band from the featured state which provided halftime entertainment.

Related to this regional marketing appeal, the Redskins remained the last bastion of racial segregation in the NFL in 1959, with the team standing alone in not including a black player on its roster from 1955 until 1962.

== Offseason ==
=== NFL draft ===
Round	Pick	Player	Position	School/Club team

== Preseason ==
Week	Date	Opponent	Result	Record	Venue	Attendance
1	August 16	at San Francisco 49ers	L 24–27	0–1	Kezar Stadium	21,101
2	August 21	at Los Angeles Rams	W 23–21	1–1	Los Angeles Memorial Coliseum	85,888
3	August 28	at Baltimore Colts	L 10–23	1–2	Baltimore Memorial Stadium	22,409
4	September 5	vs. Chicago Bears	L 14–52	1–3	Gator Bowl Stadium (Jacksonville, FL)	28,245
5	September 12	vs. Green Bay Packers	L 13–20	1–4	Bowman Gray Stadium (Winston-Salem, NC)	15,000
6	September 19	at Detroit Lions	L 14–52	1–5	Briggs Stadium	28,245

== Regular season ==
The Redskins offered seats for $5.00 and $4.50, with very few of the premium seats remaining ahead of the season. Season tickets cost $30 for the upper and South boxes and $25 for all others.

=== Schedule ===
Game	Date	Opponent	Result	Record	Venue	Attendance	Recap	Sources
1	September 27	at **Chicago Cardinals**	**L** 21–49	0–1	Soldier Field	21,892	Recap	
2	October 4	at **Pittsburgh Steelers**	**W** 23–17	1–1	Forbes Field	26,570	Recap	
3	October 11	**Chicago Cardinals**	**W** 23–14	2–1	Griffith Stadium	25,937	Recap	
4	October 18	**Pittsburgh Steelers**	**L** 6–27	2–2	Griffith Stadium	28,218	Recap	
5	October 25	at **Cleveland Browns**	**L** 7–34	2–3	Cleveland Municipal Stadium	42,732	Recap	
6	November 1	at **Philadelphia Eagles**	**L** 23–30	2–4	Franklin Field	39,854	Recap	
7	November 8	Baltimore Colts	**W** 27–24	3–4	Griffith Stadium	32,773	Recap	
8	November 15	**Cleveland Browns**	**L** 17–31	3–5	Griffith Stadium	32,266	Recap	
9	November 22	at Green Bay Packers	**L** 0–21	3–6	New City Stadium	31,853	Recap	
10	November 29	at **New York Giants**	**L** 14–45	3–7	Yankee Stadium	60,982	Recap	
11	December 6	**Philadelphia Eagles**	**L** 14–34	3–8	Griffith Stadium	24,325	Recap	
12	December 13	**New York Giants**	**L** 10–24	3–9	Griffith Stadium	26,198	Recap	
Note: Intra-conference opponents are in **bold** text.

=== Standings ===
NFL Eastern Conference
	W	L	T	PCT	CONF	PF	PA	STK
New York Giants	10	2	0	.833	8–2	284	170	W4
Philadelphia Eagles	7	5	0	.583	6–4	268	278	L1
Cleveland Browns	7	5	0	.583	6–4	270	214	W1
Pittsburgh Steelers	6	5	1	.545	6–4	257	216	W1
Washington Redskins	3	9	0	.250	2–8	185	350	L5
Chicago Cardinals	2	10	0	.167	2–8	234	324	L6

Note: Tie games were not officially counted in the standings until 1972.

== Personnel ==
=== Staff ===
1959 Washington Redskins staff
Front office: President - George Preston Marshall; Head coaches: Head coach - Mike Nixon; Assistant/Backfield - Bill McPeak; Offensive coaches: Offensive Line - Ernie Hefferle; Ends - Joe Tereshinski Sr.	Defensive coaches: Defensive Coordinator - LaVern Torgeson

=== Roster ===
1959 Washington Redskins roster
Quarterbacks (QB): 10 Eagle Day S; 3 Ralph Guglielmi; 14 Eddie LeBaron; Running backs (RB): 31 Don Bosseler; 47 Dick James S; 0 Johnny Olszewski; 30 Ed Sutton; Wide receivers (WR): 42 Bill Anderson; 82 Ken MacAfee; 24 Jim Podoley; 81 Joe Walton; Tight ends (TE)	Offensive linemen (OL): 62 Don Boll G/T; 78 Don Lawrence G/DT; 70 Ray Lemek T; 73 John Miller T/DT; 51 Jim Schrader C; 67 Red Stephens G; Defensive linemen (DL): 89 Art Gob DE/OLB; 83 Ed Meadows DE; 88 Chet Ostrowski DE/DT; 86 John Paluck DE; 71 Will Renfro DT/T; 79 Bob Toneff DT	Linebackers (LB): 85 Tom Braatz OLB; 36 Chuck Drazenovich MLB; 45 Ralph Felton OLB; 63 Emil Karas OLB/MLB/DE; 56 Frank Kuchta MLB/C; Defensive backs (DB): 43 Dick Haley S/CB/RB; 21 Gary Glick CB/S; 25 Dick McCabe S; 20 Doyle Nix S; 48 Ben Scotti CB; Special teams (ST): 49 Sam Baker K/P	Reserve: 29 Bert Zagers S/CB/RB (IR); Rookies in italics

== Statistics ==
=== Passing ===
Player	Comp	Att	Pct	Yds	TD	Int	Rate
Eddie LeBaron	77	173	44.5%	1,077	8	11	61.4

=== Rushing ===
Player	Attempts	Yards	Average	Long	Touchdowns
Don Bosseler	119	644	5.4	41	3

=== Receiving ===
Player	Number	Yards	Average	Long	Touchdowns
Bill Anderson	35	734	66.7	70	6
Joe Walton	21	317	35.2	41	3
