= Gary Wisener =

American football player (1938–2020)

No. 84, 22
- Position: Wide receiver

Personal information
- Born: August 24, 1938; Warren, Arkansas
- Died: December 7, 2020 (aged 82); Hot Springs, Arkansas
- Listed height: 6 ft 1 in (1.85 m)
- Listed weight: 206 lb (93 kg)

Career information
- High school: Fort Smith (AR)
- College: Baylor
- AFL draft: 1960

Career history
- Dallas Cowboys (1960); Houston Oilers (1961)

Awards and highlights
- Track All-American (1959); AFL champion (1961)

Career statistics
- Games played: 15
- Stats at Pro Football Reference

Gary Gayle Wisener (August 24, 1938 – December 7, 2020) was an American football wide receiver in the National Football League for the Dallas Cowboys. He also was a member of the Houston Oilers in the American Football League, during their second AFL Championship season. He played college football at Baylor University.

== Early life ==
Wisener attended Fort Smith High School before moving on to Baylor University.

He became a starter as a senior at left offensive end. During the 1960 Southwest Conference Track and Field Championships, he won first place in the javelin competition, while also placing in the broad jump and the high hurdles.

== Professional career ==
=== Dallas Cowboys ===
Wisener was selected by the Boston Patriots in the 1960 AFL draft, but instead chose to sign with the NFL's Dallas Cowboys as a free agent. In training camp he was limited by a cut heel he suffered while taking a shower.

He made the team and was a part of the franchise's inaugural season, playing mainly as a backup safety in 10 games (3 starts). He was waived on September 5, 1961.

=== Houston Oilers ===
On September 22, 1961, he was signed by the Houston Oilers and was a part of the team that won the American Football League Championship. He was released on August 21, 1962.
