= Fred Dugan =

American football player (1934–2018)

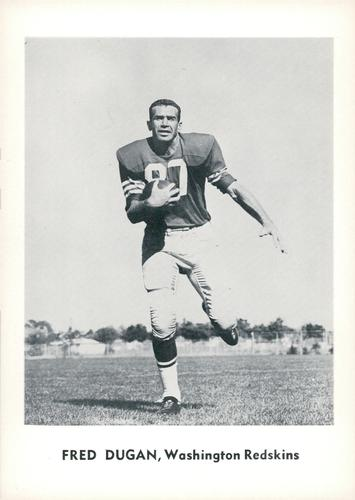

No. 87, 89
- Positions: Wide receiver, tight end

Personal information
- Born: May 12, 1933; Stamford, Connecticut, U.S.
- Died: March 3, 2018 (aged 84); Nokomis, Florida, U.S.
- Listed height: 6 ft 3 in (1.91 m)
- Listed weight: 205 lb (93 kg)

Career information
- High school: Stamford
- College: Dayton
- NFL draft: 1957: 7th round, 80th overall pick

Career history
- San Francisco 49ers (1958–1959); Dallas Cowboys (1960); Washington Redskins (1961–1963)

Awards and highlights
- First-team All-American (1957)

Career NFL statistics
- Receptions: 153
- Receiving yards: 2,226
- Touchdowns: 13
- Stats at Pro Football Reference

John Frederick "Butch" Dugan (May 12, 1933 – March 3, 2018) was an American professional football end. He played in the National Football League (NFL) for the San Francisco 49ers, Dallas Cowboys and Washington Redskins. He played college football at the University of Dayton and the University of Alabama.

== Early life and college ==
After attending Stamford High School, he first enrolled at the University of Alabama, but left as a sophomore to manage the family restaurant after his father became ill.

In 1954, he was recruited by the University of Dayton where he played running back and safety in his first two years, before switching to a two-way end.

As a senior, he led the nation and broke the school's receiving record with 37 receptions for 546 yards in seven games (he also punted 28 times for a 32.2-yard average), earning him All-American honors and an invitation to the East–West Shrine Game.

== Professional career ==
=== San Francisco 49ers ===
Dugan was selected by the San Francisco 49ers as a junior in the seventh round (80th overall) of the 1957 NFL draft, but didn't join the league until 1958. Although he saw limited playing time during his first two seasons, he was known for making spectacular catches.

=== Dallas Cowboys ===
The Dallas Cowboys selected Dugan in the 1960 NFL expansion draft, where along with Billy Howton, became the first wide receivers ever to start for the franchise. That year, he was the second leading receiver on the team (behind Jim Doran), while earning a reputation for spectacular catches and producing 29 receptions for 461 yards and a touchdown.

After asking to be traded to be closer to his ailing father, he was sent to the Washington Redskins in a three-team deal on July 5, 1961. The Redskins acquired Dugan, placekicker John Aveni, defensive back Dave Whitsell and offensive end Jerry Daniels. The New York Giants obtained offensive ends Joe Walton and Jim Podoley. The Cowboys received placekicker Allen Green and a sixth round for the 1962 NFL draft that the team later used to draft George Andrie.

=== Washington Redskins ===
Dugan flourished with the Redskins in his first season, breaking the team receiving record and setting career highs with 53 receptions for 817 yards and four touchdowns. In his second season after the Redskins obtained Bobby Mitchell, he had 36 receptions for 466 yards and five touchdowns.

He retired following the 1963 season after having 20 receptions for 288 yards. His career totals were 153 receptions for 2,226 yards and 13 touchdowns. Dugan died in March 2018 at the age of 84.
