= Dave Whitsell =

American football player (1936–1999)

No. 23
- Position: Cornerback

Personal information
- Born: June 14, 1936; Shelby, Michigan, U.S.
- Died: October 7, 1999 (aged 63); Kenner, Louisiana, U.S.
- Listed height: 6 ft 0 in (1.83 m)
- Listed weight: 189 lb (86 kg)

Career information
- High school: Shelby
- College: Indiana (1954–1957)
- NFL draft: 1958: 24th round, 289th overall pick

Career history
- Detroit Lions (1958–1960); Chicago Bears (1961–1966); New Orleans Saints (1967–1969); Dallas Cowboys (1970)*
- * Offseason or practice squad member only

Awards and highlights
- NFL champion (1963); Second-team All-Pro (1967); Pro Bowl (1967); NFL interceptions co-leader (1967); New Orleans Saints Hall of Fame

Career NFL statistics
- Interceptions: 46
- Fumble recoveries: 9
- Total touchdowns: 5
- Stats at Pro Football Reference

David Andrew Whitsell (June 14, 1936 – October 7, 1999) was an American professional football cornerback in the National Football League (NFL) for the Detroit Lions, Chicago Bears, and New Orleans Saints. He was selected to the Pro Bowl after the 1967 season. Whitsell played college football at Indiana University.

== Early life ==
Whitsell was born on June 14, 1936, in Shelby, Michigan, a small town in West Michigan near Lake Michigan. Whitsell attended Shelby High School, graduating in 1954. He earned 16 high school letters in football, basketball, track, and baseball, graduating in 1954.

As a sophomore in 1952, he was All-West Michigan Conference (WMC) in basketball, playing center at only 5 ft, 7 in (1.7 m). He competed in hurdles, broad jump and shot put on the track team, winning the Class C broad jump championship in 1954. He was nicknamed the "one-man-gang" in track for his success in multiple different events.

On the football team, in the first game of his senior year he rushed for 201 yards, with a 16.7 yards per carry average, and scored four touchdowns. The following week he scored another touchdown and passed for two more. In another game that year he scored five touchdowns of 75, 70, 21, eight and six yards. He was named to the All-WMC football team that year, and was All-State in Class C football.

== College football ==
Whitsell attended Indiana University, and played two years on the varsity football team in 1956–57). These were losing seasons for the team, 3–6 and 1–8 respectively. Whitsell, however, stood out on a bad team, accounting for nearly half of the team's entire offensive yardage through four games in 1957, when the team lost all four games by a combined total of 183–7. In 1957, he led the team in receiving, including a game against Iowa where he had three receptions for 107 yards.

== Professional football ==
Over 12 seasons (1958–1960, 1961–66, 1967–69), he played at the cornerback, defensive back, and free safety positions in the NFL with the Lions, Bears, and Saints respectively.

=== Detroit Lions ===
Whitsell was chosen by the Detroit Lions in the 24th round of the 1958 NFL Draft (289th overall). He appeared in 35 career games with the Lions over the next three years, but started in only three, with one interception.

=== 1961 NFL expansion draft and trades ===
Whitsell was exposed in the 1961 NFL expansion draft, and in late January 1961 Whitsell was selected by the newly created Minnesota Vikings. On July 1, 1961, the Vikings traded Whitsell, Zeke Smith, and two high 1962 draft choices to the New York Giants for Mel Triplett, Bob Schnelker, and Bob Schmidt. Less than one week later, Whitsell was involved in a three-team transaction between the Giants, the Washington Redskins, and the Dallas Cowboys. Jim Podoley and Joe Walton went from Washington to New York; the Giants sent Whitsell, John Aveni, and Jerry Daniels to Washington; the Giants sent Allen Green and a draft pick to Dallas; and Dallas traded Fred Dugan to Washington. The Giants had obtained Aveni on June 29, 1961, from the Chicago Bears for defensive back Lee Riley.

After this three-team trade, Whitsell refused to report to Washington. The Giants arranged for another player to be sent to Washington (Gene Cronin) in place of Whitsell; and the Giants sent Whitsell to the Chicago Bears, reportedly as compensation for Aveni. It was also reported that the Giants sent Whitsell to the Bears for a draft choice.

=== Chicago Bears ===
During his six years with the Bears, he started 83 of the teams 84 regular season games at right cornerback. He was given the nickname "Weasel" for his cunning style of play. He had 26 interceptions for the Bears, two of which he returned for touchdowns. One of those touchdowns came in 1963 against former Lions teammate, and fellow Michigan native and Muskegon Area Sports Hall of Fame member, Earl Morrall; clinching the final regular season game with important playoff implications for the Bears.

With the Chicago Bears he was one of the members of the 1963 National Football League championship team, which included among others Rosey Taylor and Richie Petitbon in the defensive backfield; future coach and Hall of Fame tight end Mike Ditka; future Hall of Fame defensive end Doug Adkins; and future Hall of Fame linebacker Bill George. The game, which was played on December 29, 1963, at Wrigley Field in Chicago, pitted the visiting New York Giants against the Bears in the 31st annual event. The Bears won, 14–10. Giants quarterback Y. A. Tittle threw five interceptions in the game, including an interception by Whitsell.

Whitsell started every Bears game from 1964 to 1966, with nine interceptions, one of which he returned for a touchdown in 1965. After the 1963 championship, however, the Bears had below .500 records during two of those three seasons.

=== New Orleans Saints ===
Just as in 1961, Whitsell was left exposed in the 1967 expansion draft, and was taken by the newly created New Orleans Saints. That first Saints team also included former Bears teammate Adkins, and former Green Bay Packer star Jim Taylor, among others. But it was Whitsell that was considered the Saints first true star.

In the Saints inaugural season, Whitsell became the first member of the New Orleans franchise to play in a Pro Bowl, when he was selected to play in the NFL's 1967 Pro Bowl game. In 1967, Whitsell also tied for the NFL league lead in interceptions with 10 (along with Lem Barney), two of which he returned for touchdowns. He was Defensive Player of the Week in the eighth week of the 1967 season, in a game against the Philadelphia Eagles, where he returned an interception 41 yards for a touchdown. This was the Saints first ever win. The Associated Press and United Press International named him second-team All-Pro in 1967, and The Sporting News named him first-team All-Conference.

He started 13 games for the Saints in 1968 at free safety, with six interceptions; and had three interceptions at free safety in 1969, starting in 12 games. He was traded to the Dallas Cowboys before the 1970 season, who waived him, ending his professional football career.

=== Career ===
At the time he retired Whitsell had 46 career interceptions, four of which he returned for touchdowns. He ranked in the top 10 for interceptions all-time at that point. As of 2024, he is tied for 52nd all-time in interceptions.

== Honors ==
Whitsell was inducted into the Muskegon Area Sports Hall of Fame in 1989, and the New Orleans Saints Hall of Fame in 1996.

== Personal life ==
After his retirement from football he became a real estate investor. He was also a member of the National Football League Retired Players Association and the Kenner North Kiwanis Club.

== Death ==
He was diagnosed with colon and prostate cancer in 1995 and died from cancer in 1999.
