= Jim Podoley =

American football player (1933–2010)

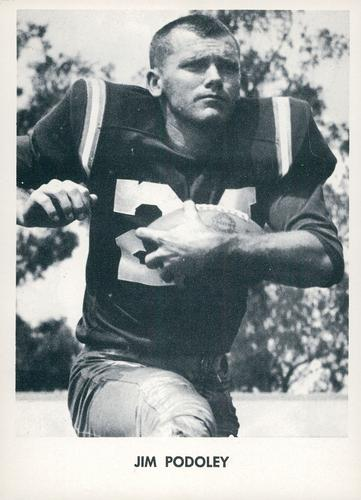

No. 24
- Positions: Halfback, end

Personal information
- Born: September 16, 1933; Mount Morris, Michigan, U.S.
- Died: January 24, 2010 (aged 76); Bowie, Maryland, U.S.
- Listed height: 6 ft 2 in (1.88 m)
- Listed weight: 200 lb (91 kg)

Career information
- High school: Mount Morris
- College: Central Michigan (1953–1956)
- NFL draft: 1957: 4th round, 40th overall pick

Career history
- Washington Redskins (1957–1960); New York Giants (1961)*
- * Offseason or practice squad member only

Awards and highlights
- Pro Bowl (1957); Second-team Little All-American (1956); Central Michigan Chippewas No. 62 retired

Career NFL statistics
- Rushing yards: 746
- Rushing average: 3.6
- Receptions: 78
- Receiving yards: 1,461
- Total touchdowns: 13
- Stats at Pro Football Reference

James "Poodles" Podoley (September 16, 1933 – January 24, 2010) was an American professional football halfback and end who spent four seasons with the Washington Redskins in the National Football League (NFL).

== College career ==
Born in Mount Morris, Michigan, Podoley competed in college football and track and field at Central Michigan University. As an All-American for the Chippewas team, he finished seventh in the long jump and 220 yards hurdles at the 1954 NCAA track and field championships.

== Professional career ==
Often called "Poodles" because of his last name, Podoley was selected in the fourth round of the 1957 NFL draft. At 24, Podoley had an impressive debut as the leader of the so-called Papoose Backfield that featured fellow Redskins rookies Don Bosseler, 21, and halfback Ed Sutton, 22. He accounted for 996 of the 2,260 yards that the threesome gained from scrimmage and six of their 19 touchdowns, a performance that earned him a roster spot on the East squad in the Pro Bowl game.

Hobbled by various injuries, Podoley never fully regained his early form in the next three seasons. In July 1961, he was involved in a three-team trade with the Redskins, Dallas Cowboys and New York Giants. The Giants acquired Podoley and end Joe Walton from the Redskins, the Redskins obtained end Fred Dugan from the Cowboys and placekicker John Aveni, end Jerry Daniels and defensive halfback Dave Whitsell from the Giants and the Cowboys received placekicker Allen Green as well as a sixth-round draft from the Giants, a pick that was used to draft George Andrie one year later. However, Podoley never played for the Giants after he opted for retirement at 27 years of age because of football-related health issues.

Podoley died from melanoma on January 24, 2010, at the age of 76 in Bowie, Maryland. He was survived by his wife of 53 years, Patricia, along with four children and nine grandchildren.

== NFL career statistics ==
Legend
	Led the league
**Bold**	Career high

Year	Team	Games		Rushing					Receiving				
Year	Team	GP	GS	Att	Yds	Avg	Lng	TD	Rec	Yds	Avg	Lng	TD
1957	WAS	12	12	**114**	**442**	3.9	**33**	**2**	**27**	**554**	20.5	**82**	**4**
1958	WAS	10	7	48	169	3.5	9	0	16	381	**23.8**	66	**4**
1959	WAS	11	5	18	83	**4.6**	25	0	18	282	15.7	48	2
1960	WAS	10	7	29	52	1.8	9	0	17	244	14.4	41	1
Career		43	31	209	746	3.6	33	2	78	1,461	18.7	82	11
