= Jim Doran =

American football player (1927–1994)

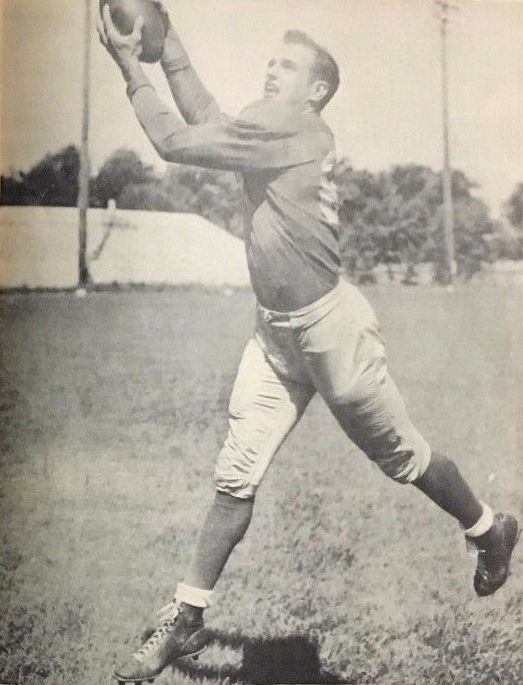

No. 20, 83
- Positions: End, defensive end

Personal information
- Born: August 11, 1927; Beaver, Iowa, U.S.
- Died: June 30, 1994 (aged 66); Lake City, Iowa, U.S.
- Listed height: 6 ft 2 in (1.88 m)
- Listed weight: 201 lb (91 kg)

Career information
- High school: Beaver
- College: Iowa State
- NFL draft: 1951: 5th round, 55th overall pick

Career history

Playing
- Detroit Lions (1951–1959); Dallas Cowboys (1960–1961); Denver Broncos (1962)*
- * Offseason or practice squad member only

Coaching
- Pittsburgh Steelers (1964–1965) Assistant

Awards and highlights
- 3× NFL champion (1952, 1953, 1957); Pro Bowl (1960); First-team All-American (1950); 2× First-team All-Big Seven (1949, 1950)

Career NFL statistics
- Receptions: 212
- Receiving yards: 3,667
- Receiving touchdowns: 24
- Stats at Pro Football Reference

James Robert Doran (/ˈdɔːrən/ DOR-ən; August 11, 1927 – June 30, 1994) was an American professional football player in the National Football League (NFL) for the Detroit Lions (1951–1959) and Dallas Cowboys (1960–1961). He played college football for the Iowa State Cyclones. He was a two-way player, playing both on offense and defense. He played 94 games as a defensive lineman, usually defensive end, and 115 games as a tight end.

== Early life ==
Because of the small size of Beaver High School, it had no football program, so Doran practiced basketball and baseball. As a high school basketball player, Doran once scored 36 of the 38 total points scored by his team in a single contest. On the baseball diamond Doran possessed prolific home run power as a switch hitter while playing the catcher position. Against Rippey High School as senior, Doran belted 3 home runs, 2 as a right handed hitter and 1 as a lefty. His first exposure to the sport of football was at Buena Vista College in the fall of 1947, on the "B" team, joining after a short stint in the navy during World War II. He played defensive tackle despite being a relative lightweight at 190 pounds.

Doran transferred to Iowa State University in 1947, joining the track team as a sprinter, high jumper and shot putter. Doran had his 1948 football season end in the season opener with a broken right ankle. In 1949, he helped the team post a 5–3–1 record, the school's first winning football season in a span of 14 years, and being named to the All-Big Seven team at offensive end, with 689 yards on 34 catches, breaking the single-season Big Seven receiving mark by over 200 yards. He also set an NCAA record against the Oklahoma Sooners by catching eight passes for 203 yards.

In 1950, his 652 yards on 42 receptions and six touchdowns as a senior, earned him first-team All-American and All-Big Seven honors. He was the Cyclone's only football All-American in two decades, and more recently he was voted to the modern All-time All-Big Eight team. Doran closed out his Cyclone career owning virtually every Iowa State and Big Seven receiving mark. He also played in the Hula Bowl and East–West Shrine Game in 1951.

In 1997 he was inducted as an Inaugural member, into the Iowa State University Athletics Hall of Fame. Doran was inducted into The Des Moines Register Sports Hall of Fame in 1973. In 2005, he was inducted into the Iowa Sports Hall of Fame. In 1983, he was inducted into the Iowa High School Football Hall of Fame, despite never playing high school football. Doran was deemed an "outstanding example for the young men of the state of Iowa".

== Professional career ==
=== Detroit Lions ===
Doran was selected by the Detroit Lions in the fifth round (55th overall) of the 1951 NFL draft. He became a starter as a rookie at defensive end. He also was used on the offensive side, registering 10 receptions, 225 receiving yards, a 22.5-yard average (fourth in the league) and 2 touchdowns.

In 1952, he was voted the most valuable player on a Lions team that won the 1952 NFL Championship Game. His teammates nicknamed him the Graham Cracker, because of his ferocious rushing of Otto Graham as a defensive end, in all of the Detroit-Cleveland games he played in.

In 1953, he started playing both offense and defense because of injuries to teammates. The biggest play of his pro career occurred in the 1953 NFL Championship Game, when he caught a 33-yard touchdown pass, that pulled out a 17–16 victory. Doran kept playing the offensive end position and led the Lions in receiving in 1957.

After the 1959 season, because of his age, the Lions left him off their list of players who were exempt from the 1960 NFL expansion draft.

=== Dallas Cowboys ===
Doran was selected by the Dallas Cowboys in the 1960 NFL Expansion Draft. He was converted into a tight end at 33 years of age, becoming the first starter at that position in franchise history, while registering 31 catches (led the team) for 554 yards (led the team) and 3 touchdowns.

At the end of the season, he had the distinction of becoming the Cowboys’ first Pro Bowl player in franchise history, and also scoring the Cowboys' first touchdown in franchise history, a 75-yard pass from Eddie LeBaron against the Pittsburgh Steelers on September 24, 1960.

Doran started the franchise's legacy of Pro Bowl tight ends that includes: Dick Bielski, Lee Folkins, Billy Joe Dupree, Doug Cosbie, Jay Novacek and Jason Witten.

He was released after playing two seasons in Dallas and a total of 11 seasons in the NFL, compiling 212 receptions for 3,667 yards and 24 touchdowns.

=== Denver Broncos ===
On July 22, 1962, Doran signed as a free agent with the Denver Broncos of the American Football League, but his season ended after injuring his back during a victory against the Dallas Texans and being placed on the injured reserve list on August 27.

== NFL career statistics ==
Legend
| | Won the NFL championship |
| | Led the league |
| **Bold** | Career high |

=== Regular season ===
| Year | Team | Games | | Receiving | | | | |
| Year | Team | GP | GS | Rec | Yds | Avg | Lng | TD |
|---|---|---|---|---|---|---|---|---|
| 1951 | DET | 12 | 9 | 10 | 225 | **22.5** | 48 | 2 |
| 1952 | DET | 11 | 7 | 10 | 147 | 14.7 | 31 | 1 |
| 1953 | DET | 7 | 0 | 6 | 75 | 12.5 | 30 | 0 |
| 1954 | DET | 7 | 0 | 10 | 203 | 20.3 | 49 | 4 |
| 1955 | DET | 10 | 9 | **38** | 552 | 14.5 | 38 | 2 |
| 1956 | DET | 11 | 8 | 25 | 448 | 17.9 | 70 | 0 |
| 1957 | DET | 12 | 9 | 33 | **624** | 18.9 | 65 | **5** |
| 1958 | DET | 9 | 8 | 22 | 495 | **22.5** | 65 | 4 |
| 1959 | DET | 10 | 0 | 14 | 191 | 13.6 | 25 | 1 |
| 1960 | DAL | 12 | 9 | 31 | 554 | 17.9 | **75** | 3 |
| 1961 | DAL | 14 | 0 | 13 | 153 | 11.8 | 29 | 2 |
| | | 115 | 59 | 212 | 3,667 | 17.3 | 75 | 24 |

=== Playoffs ===
| Year | Team | Games | | Receiving | | | | |
| Year | Team | GP | GS | Rec | Yds | Avg | Lng | TD |
|---|---|---|---|---|---|---|---|---|
| 1952 | DET | 2 | 2 | 0 | 0 | 0.0 | 0 | 0 |
| 1953 | DET | 1 | 0 | 4 | 95 | 23.8 | 33 | **1** |
| 1954 | DET | 1 | 0 | 0 | 0 | 0.0 | 0 | 0 |
| 1957 | DET | 2 | 2 | **5** | **152** | **30.4** | **78** | **1** |
| | | 6 | 4 | 9 | 247 | 27.4 | 78 | 2 |

== Personal life ==
Doran rejoined his old Detroit Lions head coach, Buddy Parker, as an assistant with the Pittsburgh Steelers for the 1964 and 1965 seasons.

He returned to Iowa to farm after football. Two of his sons, Jim jr. and Lant Doran played football for Iowa State University. The father-sons combined for 9 varsity football letters at ISU, a record for the University. Jim died on June 29, 1994, of a heart attack.

Beginning in 1994 the Iowa State football team created the Jim Doran Award. It is typically given to the team's Outstanding Special Teams Player or a player who exemplifies the relentless work ethic Doran was famous for.
