= 1959 Philadelphia Eagles season =

NFL team season

- Owner: Happy Hundred
- Head coach: Buck Shaw

Results
- Record: 7–5
- Division place: 2nd (tied) NFL Eastern
- Playoffs: Did not qualify

The 1959 Philadelphia Eagles season was the franchise's 27th season in the National Football League. They improved on their previous output of 2–9–1, winning seven games. The team failed to qualify for the playoffs for the tenth consecutive season.

== Off-season ==
The Eagles held training camp in Hershey, Pennsylvania.

=== NFL draft ===
The 1959 NFL draft was held on December 2, 1958 (rounds 1–4) and January 21, 1959 (rounds 5–30). The draft consisted of 30 rounds with each of the 12 NFL teams having one draft pick in each round. A total of 360 players were selected in this year's draft. There was no lottery bonus pick this year as it had run its course; all 12 teams had been given a bonus pick in previous drafts.

As the Green Bay Packers had the worst record in the previous season at 1–10–1, they had the first draft pick, and selected Randy Duncan, the quarterback for the Iowa Hawkeyes. The Packers' lone win in 1958 had been over the Eagles, 38–35, on October 26 in Green Bay.

The Eagles and the Chicago Cardinals both had 2–9–1 records in 1958, which were tied for the 2nd-worst record in the league, so they rotated in picking 2nd or 3rd in each round. Despite their poor records in 1958, both of these teams had defeated the eventual Eastern Conference champion New York Giants that year. The Eagles traded their first-round pick, the 2nd overall pick in the draft, to the Los Angeles Rams for quarterback Norm Van Brocklin. The Eagles made their first draft selection in round 2 with the 15th overall pick.

In 1959 the Eagles and Packers would both improve to 7–5–0. Then in 1960 they would each win their respective conference championships and meet in the NFL Championship game.

=== Player selections ===
The table shows the Eagles' selections and what picks they had that were traded away and the team that ended up with that pick. It is possible the Eagles' pick ended up with this team via another team that the Eagles made a trade with. Not shown are acquired picks that the Eagles traded away.

= Pro Bowler	= Hall of Famer

Round	Pick	Player	Position	College
2	15	J. D. Smith	Tackle	Rice Owls
3	26	Wray Carlton	Back	Duke Blue Devils
4	39	Jim Grazione	Quarterback	Villanova Wildcats
5	51	Nick Mumley	Tackle	Purdue Boilermakers
6	62	Al Benecick	Guard	Syracuse Orange
8	86	Wilmer Fowler	Back	Northwestern Wildcats
9	99	Gene Johnson	Back	Cincinnati Bearcats
10	110	Rollie West	Back	Villanova Wildcats
11	123	Art Powell	Wide receiver	San Jose State Spartans
12	134	Howard Keys	Tackle	Oklahoma State Cowboys
13	147	Dick Stillwagon	Back	Purdue Boilermakers
14	158	Jack Smith	Tackle	Clemson Tigers
15	171	Jim Poteete	Center	Mississippi State Bulldogs
16	182	Ken Paduch	Tackle	Auburn Tigers
17	195	Bill Craig	Tackle	Villanova
18	206	Jim Benson	Back	Georgia Tech
19	219	Alan Miller	Back	Boston College
20	230	Jim Payne	Guard	Clemson
21	243	Bob Salerno	Guard	Colorado
22	254	Jim Bowie	Tackle	Kentucky
23	267	Dick Williams	End	Southern
24	278	Gerry Benn	Tackle	Oklahoma State
25	291	Dick Jamieson	Quarterback	Bradley
26	302	Jim Burks	Tackle	Virginia Tech
27	315	Lowell Jenkins	Tackle	Wisconsin
28	326	Leo Sexton	End	Auburn Tigers
29	339	John Stolte	Tackle	Kansas State Wildcats
30	350	Angelo Mosca	Tackle	Notre Dame Fighting Irish

- 30th round pick Angelo Mosca had already chosen to play in the Canadian Football League for the Hamilton Tiger-Cats in the 1958 season after 3 years at Notre Dame and his senior year at Wyoming

== Schedule ==
Game	Date	Opponent	Result	Record	Venue	Attendance	Recap	Sources
1	September 27	at San Francisco 49ers	**L** 14–24	0–1	Kezar Stadium	41,697	Recap	
2	October 4	**New York Giants**	**W** 49–21	1–1	Franklin Field	27,023	Recap	
3	October 11	**Pittsburgh Steelers**	**W** 28–24	2–1	Franklin Field	27,343	Recap	
4	October 18	at **New York Giants**	**L** 7–24	2–2	Yankee Stadium	68,783	Recap	
5	October 25	at **Chicago Cardinals**	**W** 28–24	3–2	Metropolitan Stadium	20,112	Recap	
6	November 1	**Washington Redskins**	**W** 30–23	4–2	Franklin Field	39,854	Recap	
7	November 8	at **Cleveland Browns**	**L** 7–28	4–3	Cleveland Municipal Stadium	58,275	Recap	
8	November 15	**Chicago Cardinals**	**W** 27–17	5–3	Franklin Field	28,887	Recap	
9	November 22	Los Angeles Rams	**W** 23–20	6–3	Franklin Field	47,425	Recap	
10	November 29	at **Pittsburgh Steelers**	**L** 0–31	6–4	Forbes Field	22,191	Recap	
11	December 6	at **Washington Redskins**	**W** 34–14	7–4	Griffith Stadium	24,325	Recap	
12	December 13	**Cleveland Browns**	**L** 21–28	7–5	Franklin Field	45,952	Recap	
Note: Intra-conference opponents are in **bold** text.

== Standings ==
NFL Eastern Conference
	W	L	T	PCT	CONF	PF	PA	STK
New York Giants	10	2	0	.833	8–2	284	170	W4
Philadelphia Eagles	7	5	0	.583	6–4	268	278	L1
Cleveland Browns	7	5	0	.583	6–4	270	214	W1
Pittsburgh Steelers	6	5	1	.545	6–4	257	216	W1
Washington Redskins	3	9	0	.250	2–8	185	350	L5
Chicago Cardinals	2	10	0	.167	2–8	234	324	L6

Note: Tie games were not officially counted in the standings until 1972.

== Roster ==
(All time List of Philadelphia Eagles players in franchise history)

= 1959 All-Star Selection	= Hall of Famer

- + After name means 1st team selection

NO.	Player	AGE	POS	GP	GS	WT	HT	YRS	College
	Buck Shaw	61	COACH	_{1958 record} 7–5–0	_{Eagles; Lifetime} 9–14–1	_{NFL; Lifetime} 80–53–5		2	Notre Dame Fighting Irish
50	Darrel Aschbacher	24	G	11	0	220	6–1	Rookie	Boise State, Oregon
33	Billy Ray Barnes	24	HB	12	0	201	5–11	2	Wake Forest
60	Chuck Bednarik	33	LB-C	12	0	233	6–3	10	Pennsylvania Quakers
36	Dick Bielski	27	E-FB	12	0	224	6–1	4	Maryland Terrapins
40	Tom Brookshier	28	DB	12	0	196	6–0	6	Colorado Buffalos
78	Marion Campbell	30	DE-DT-MG-G-T	11	0	250	6–3	5	Georgia Bulldogs
67	Stan Campbell	29	G	12	12	226	6–0	7	Iowa State
21	Jimmy Carr	26	DB-LB-HB	12	0	206	6–1	4	Charleston (WV)
63	Tom Catlin	28	LB-C	12	0	213	6–1	6	Oklahoma Sooners
45	Paige Cothren	24	K	7	0	201	5–11	2	Mississippi
74	Jerry DeLucca	23	T-DT	12	0	247	6–2	Rookie	Middle Tenn. State Blue Raiders
65	Jerry Huth	26	G	10	0	226	6–0	3	Wake Forest Demon Deacons
27	Gene Johnson	24	DB	12	0	187	6–0	Rookie	Cincinnati Bearcats
9	Sonny Jurgensen	25	QB	12	0	202	5–11	2	Duke Blue Devils
73	Ed Khayat	24	DT-DE-T	9	0	240	6–3	2	Tulane Green Wave
43	Walt Kowalczyk	24	FB-DB	12	0	208	6–0	1	Michigan State Spartans
61	Tom Louderback	26	LB-C-G	12	0	235	6–2	1	San Jose State
80	Ken MacAfee	30	E-TE	4	0	212	6–2	5	Alabama Crimson Tide
75	Jim McCusker	23	T	12	0	246	6–2	1	Pittsburgh Panthers
25	Tommy McDonald	25	FL-HB-SE-WR	12	0	178	5–9	2	Oklahoma Sooners
29	John Nocera	25	LB	12	0	220	6–1	Rookie	Iowa Hawkeyes
70	Don Owens	27	DT-T	12	0	255	6–5	2	Southern Miss Golden Eagles
32	Joe Pagliei	25	FB	7	0	220	6–0	Rookie	Clemson Tigers
26	Clarence Peaks	24	FB	12	0	218	6–1	2	Michigan State Spartans
53	Bob Pellegrini	25	LB-G	12	0	233	6–2	3	Maryland Terrapins
87	Art Powell	22	SE-DB-WR	12	0	211	6–3	Rookie	San Jose State Spartans
44	Pete Retzlaff	28	E-HB-TE	10	0	211	6–1	3	South Dakota State Jackrabbits
72	Jess Richardson	29	DT	12	0	261	6–2	6	Alabama Crimson Tide
22	Lee Riley	27	DB	12	0	192	6–1	4	Univ. of Detroit-Mercy Titans
66	Joe Robb	22	DE-LB	12	0	238	6–3	Rookie	TCU Horned Frogs
30	Theron Sapp	24	FB-HB	12	0	203	6–1	Rookie	Georgia Bulldogs
76	J.D. Smith	23	T	11	11	250	6–2	Rookie	Rice Owls
68	Bill Striegel	23	G-T-LB	12	0	235	6–2	Rookie	Pacific
11	Norm Van Brocklin	33	QB	12	12	190	6–1	10	Oregon Ducks
83	Bobby Walston	31	E-HB-K	12	0	190	6–0	8	Georgia Bulldogs
51	Chuck Weber	29	LB-DE-G	12	0	229	6–1	4	West Chester Golden Rams
88	Jerry Wilson	23	DE	12	0	238	6–3	Rookie	Auburn Tigers
	37 players team average	26.1		12		220.1	6–1.2	2.8	

== Season summary ==
=== Week 3 vs Steelers ===
Week Three: Pittsburgh Steelers (1–1) at Philadelphia Eagles (1–1)

Quarter	1	2	3	4	Total
Steelers	7	3	7	7	24
Eagles	7	7	7	7	28

at Franklin Field, Philadelphia, Pennsylvania

- Date: October 11, 1959
- Game attendance: 27,343
- Referee: Bud Brubaker
- Box Score

Team	Category	Player	Statistics
Steelers	Passing	Bobby Layne	18/33, 209 Yds, 2 TD, INT
Steelers	Rushing	Tom Tracy	11 Rush, 33 Yds
Steelers	Receiving	Tom Tracy	4 Rec, 70 Yds, TD
Eagles	Passing	Norm Van Brocklin	13/27, 172 Yds, TD, 2 INT
Eagles	Rushing	Clarence Peaks	14 Rush, 42 Yds
Eagles	Receiving	Tommy McDonald	4 Rec, 66 Yds, TD

Scoring summary

Quarter	Time	Drive			Team	Scoring information	Score	
Quarter	Time	Plays	Yards	TOP	Team	Scoring information	PIT	PHI
1					Steelers	Bobby Layne 10-yard touchdown run, Bobby Layne kick good	7	0
1					Eagles	Billy Ray Barnes 3-yard touchdown run, Bobby Walston kick good	7	7
2					Eagles	Punt returned 58 yards for touchdown by Art Powell, Bobby Walston kick good	7	14
2					Steelers	12-yard field goal by Bobby Layne	10	14
3					Eagles	Norm Van Brocklin 1-yard touchdown run, Bobby Walston kick good	10	21
3					Steelers	Tom Tracy 11-yard touchdown reception from Bobby Layne, Bobby Layne kick good	17	21
4					Eagles	Tommy McDonald 18-yard touchdown reception from Norm Van Brocklin, Bobby Walston kick good	17	28
4					Steelers	Jimmy Orr 17-yard touchdown reception from Bobby Layne, Bobby Layne kick good	24	28
"TOP" = time of possession. For other American football terms, see Glossary of American football.							24	28

== Postseason ==
Before the start of the 1960 Season, but after the 1960 NFL draft, on March 19, the NFL had an expansion draft for the Dallas Cowboys. The Philadelphia Eagles lost, Dick Bielski a tight end, Gerry Delucca an offensive tackle, and Bil Striegel, a linebacker.

== Honors and awards ==
Pro Bowl selections – East Team

  - Norm Van Brocklin – QB
  - Billy Barnes – HB
  - Tommy McDonald – Flanker
  - Marion Campbell – DT
  - Tom Brookshier – CB

League leaders

  - Norm Van Brocklin finishes 2nd in pass attempts with 340
  - Norm Van Brocklin finishes 2nd in pass completions with 191
  - Norm Van Brocklin finishes 2nd in passing yards with 2617
  - Norm Van Brocklin finishes 3rd in passing yards per Attempt Avg with 7.70
  - Norm Van Brocklin finishes 3rd in passing touchdowns with 14
  - Tommy McDonald finishes 2nd in pass receptions with 47
  - Tommy McDonald finishes 3rd in pass receiving yards with 846
  - Tommy McDonald finishes 2nd in pass reception touchdowns with 10
  - Tommy McDonald finishes 2nd (tied with 8) in punt return for a touchdown with 1
  - Tommy McDonald finishes 2nd in kickoff returns with 24
  - Art Powell finishes 2nd in kickoff returns avg. 27.1
