= 1959 Pittsburgh Steelers season =

NFL team season

- Head coach: Buddy Parker
- Home stadium: Forbes Field

Results
- Record: 6–5–1
- Division place: 4th NFL Eastern
- Playoffs: Did not qualify

The 1959 Pittsburgh Steelers season marked the franchise's 27th year in the National Football League (NFL). The team finished with a record of 6 wins, 5 losses and 1 tie, one fewer win than the previous season. Much of the decline could be attributed to a lack of fresh blood up and down the roster. The team didn't have a draft choice until the eighth round, where it selected Purdue University halfback Tom Barnett at the 81st overall pick. None of the two running backs the Steelers drafted played a single snap with the Steelers, with J.W. Brodnax going to the 1960 Denver Broncos, and Charley Tolar going to the 1960–1966 Houston Oilers.

== Regular season ==
In 1959 the Steelers offered seats at four price levels — $6.00, $5.00, $4.00, and $3.00. No season prices for the six game slate were published.

=== Schedule ===
| Game | Date | Opponent | Result | Record | Venue | Attendance | Recap | Sources |
|---|---|---|---|---|---|---|---|---|
| 1 | September 26 | **Cleveland Browns** | **W** 17–7 | 1–0 | Forbes Field | 33,844 | Recap | |
| 2 | October 4 | **Washington Redskins** | **L** 17–23 | 1–1 | Forbes Field | 26,750 | Recap | |
| 3 | October 11 | at **Philadelphia Eagles** | **L** 24–28 | 1–2 | Franklin Field | 27,343 | Recap | |
| 4 | October 18 | at **Washington Redskins** | **W** 27–6 | 2–2 | Griffith Stadium | 28,218 | Recap | |
| 5 | October 25 | **New York Giants** | **L** 16–21 | 2–3 | Forbes Field | 33,596 | Recap | |
| 6 | November 1 | at **Chicago Cardinals** | **L** 24–45 | 2–4 | Soldier Field | 23,187 | Recap | |
| 7 | November 8 | Detroit Lions | **T** 10–10 | 2–4–1 | Forbes Field | 24,614 | Recap | |
| 8 | November 15 | at **New York Giants** | **W** 14–9 | 3–4–1 | Yankee Stadium | 66,786 | Recap | |
| 9 | November 22 | at **Cleveland Browns** | **W** 21–20 | 4–4–1 | Cleveland Stadium | 68,563 | Recap | |
| 10 | November 29 | **Philadelphia Eagles** | **W** 31–0 | 5–4–1 | Forbes Field | 22,191 | Recap | |
| 11 | December 6 | at Chicago Bears | **L** 21–27 | 5–5–1 | Wrigley Field | 41,476 | Recap | |
| 12 | December 13 | **Chicago Cardinals** | **W** 35–20 | 6–5–1 | Forbes Field | 19,011 | Recap | |
Note: Intra-conference opponents are in **bold** text.

=== Game summaries ===
==== Week 1 (Saturday September 26, 1959): Cleveland Browns ====
| | 1 | 2 | 3 | 4 | Total |
|---|---|---|---|---|---|
| Browns | 0 | 7 | 0 | 0 | **7** |
| **Steelers** | 0 | 0 | 10 | 7 | **17** |

at Forbes Field, Pittsburgh, Pennsylvania

- Game time:
- Game weather:
- Game attendance: 33,844
- Referee:
- TV announcers:

Scoring drives:

- Cleveland – Plum 1 run (Groza kick) CLE 7–0
- Pittsburgh – FG Layne 26 CLE 7–3
- Pittsburgh – Orr 20 pass from Layne (Layne kick) PIT 10–7
- Pittsburgh – Brewster 19 pass from Layne (Layne kick) PIT 17-7

==== Week 2 (Sunday October 4, 1959): Washington Redskins ====
| | 1 | 2 | 3 | 4 | Total |
|---|---|---|---|---|---|
| **Redskins** | 3 | 6 | 14 | 0 | **23** |
| Steelers | 0 | 0 | 10 | 7 | **17** |

at Forbes Field, Pittsburgh, Pennsylvania

- Game time:
- Game weather:
- Game attendance: 26,750
- Referee:
- TV announcers:

Scoring drives:

- Washington – FG Baker 25 WSH 3–0
- Washington – FG Baker 47 WSH 3–0
- Washington – FG Baker 48 WSH 9–0
- Washington – Anderson 70 pass from Gugliemi (Baker kick) WSH 16–0
- Pittsburgh – FG Layne 32 WSH 16–3
- Washington – Walton 26 pass from Gugliemi (Baker kick)WSH 23–3
- Pittsburgh – Brewster 30 pass from Layne (Layne kick) WSH 23-10
- Pittsburgh – Krutko 2 run (Layne kick) WSH 23–17

==== Week 3 (Sunday October 11, 1959): Philadelphia Eagles ====
| | 1 | 2 | 3 | 4 | Total |
|---|---|---|---|---|---|
| Steelers | 7 | 3 | 7 | 7 | **24** |
| **Eagles** | 7 | 7 | 7 | 7 | **28** |

at Franklin Field, Philadelphia, Pennsylvania

- Game time:
- Game weather:
- Game attendance: 27,343
- Referee: Bud Brubaker
- TV announcers:

Scoring drives:

- Steelers – Bobby Layne 10 run (Layne kick), PIT 7–0
- Eagles – Billy Ray Barnes 3 run (Walston kick), TIE 7–7
- Eagles – Art Powell 58 punt return (Walston kick), PHI 14–7
- Steelers – FG Bobby Lane 12, PHI 14–10
- Eagles – Norm Van Brocklin 1 run (Walston kick), PHI 21–10
- Steelers – Tom Tracy 11 pass from Layne (Layne kick), PHI 21–17
- Eagles – Tommy McDonald 18 pass from Van Brocklin (Walston kick), PHI 28–17
- Steelers – Jimmy Orr 17 pass from Layne (Layne kick), PHI 28–24

| Team | Category | Player | Statistics |
|---|---|---|---|
| Steelers | Passing | Bobby Layne | 18/33, 209 Yds, 2 TD, INT |
| Steelers | Rushing | Tom Tracy | 11 Rush, 33 Yds |
| Steelers | Receiving | Tom Tracy | 4 Rec, 70 Yds, TD |
| Eagles | Passing | Norm Van Brocklin | 13/27, 172 Yds, TD, 2 INT |
| Eagles | Rushing | Clarence Peaks | 14 Rush, 42 Yds |
| Eagles | Receiving | Tommy McDonald | 4 Rec, 66 Yds, TD |

==== Week 4 (Sunday October 18, 1959): Washington Redskins ====
| | 1 | 2 | 3 | 4 | Total |
|---|---|---|---|---|---|
| **Steelers** | 14 | 7 | 0 | 6 | **27** |
| Redskins | 6 | 0 | 0 | 0 | **6** |

at Griffith Stadium, Washington, DC

- Game time:
- Game weather:
- Game attendance: 28,218
- Referee:
- TV announcers:

Scoring drives:

- Pittsburgh – Krutko 1 run (Layne kick)
- Pittsburgh – Tarasovic 38 fumble run (Layne kick)
- Washington – FG Baker 30
- Washington – FG Baker 39
- Pittsburgh – Krutko 4 run (Layne kick)
- Pittsburgh – FG Layne 23
- Pittsburgh – FG Layne 22

==== Week 5 (Sunday October 25, 1959): New York Giants ====
| | 1 | 2 | 3 | 4 | Total |
|---|---|---|---|---|---|
| **Giants** | 14 | 0 | 0 | 7 | **21** |
| Steelers | 10 | 0 | 3 | 3 | **16** |

at Forbes Field, Pittsburgh, Pennsylvania

- Game time:
- Game weather:
- Game attendance: 33,596
- Referee:
- TV announcers:

Scoring drives:

- Pittsburgh – FG Layne 37
- New York Giants – Gifford 77 pass from Conerly (Summerall kick)
- New York Giants – Gifford 28 pass from Conerly (Summerall kick)
- Pittsburgh – Dial 35 pass from Layne (Layne kick)
- Pittsburgh – FG Layne 19
- New York Giants – Huff 5 fumble run (Summerall kick)
- Pittsburgh – FG Layne 17

==== Week 6 (Sunday November 1, 1959): Chicago Cardinals ====
| | 1 | 2 | 3 | 4 | Total |
|---|---|---|---|---|---|
| Steelers | 0 | 10 | 7 | 7 | **24** |
| **Cardinals** | 14 | 21 | 0 | 10 | **45** |

at Comiskey Park, Chicago, Illinois

- Game time:
- Game weather:
- Game attendance:
- Referee:
- TV announcers:

==== Week 7 (Sunday November 8, 1959): Detroit Lions ====
| | 1 | 2 | 3 | 4 | Total |
|---|---|---|---|---|---|
| Lions | 7 | 0 | 0 | 3 | **10** |
| Steelers | 0 | 0 | 3 | 7 | **10** |

at Forbes Field, Pittsburgh, Pennsylvania

- Game time:
- Game weather:
- Game attendance: 24,614
- Referee:
- TV announcers:

Scoring drives:

- Detroit – Rote 1 run (Perry kick)
- Pittsburgh – FG Layne 29
- Detroit – FG Martin 27
- Pittsburgh – Tracy 20 pass from Layne (Layne kick)

==== Week 8 (Sunday November 15, 1959): New York Giants ====
| | 1 | 2 | 3 | 4 | Total |
|---|---|---|---|---|---|
| **Steelers** | 0 | 7 | 0 | 7 | **14** |
| Giants | 0 | 6 | 3 | 0 | **9** |

at Yankee Stadium, Bronx, New York

- Game time:
- Game weather:
- Game attendance: 66,786
- Referee:
- TV announcers:

Scoring drives:

- New York Giants – FG Summerall 21
- New York Giants – FG Summerall 27
- Pittsburgh – Orr 4 pass from Layne (Layne kick)
- New York Giants – FG Summerall 29
- Pittsburgh – Tracy 45 pass from Layne (Layne kick)

==== Week 9 (Sunday November 22, 1959): Cleveland Browns ====
| | 1 | 2 | 3 | 4 | Total |
|---|---|---|---|---|---|
| **Steelers** | 0 | 14 | 0 | 7 | **21** |
| Browns | 0 | 6 | 0 | 14 | **20** |

at Cleveland Municipal Stadium, Cleveland, Ohio

- Game time:
- Game weather:
- Game attendance: 68,563
- Referee:
- TV announcers:

Scoring drives:

- Pittsburgh – Tracy 4 run (Layne kick)
- Pittsburgh – Tracy 1 run (Layne kick)
- Cleveland – Renfro 30 pass from Plum (kick failed)
- Cleveland – Renfro 28 pass from Plum (Groza kick)
- Cleveland – Renfro 70 pass from Plum (Groza kick)
- Pittsburgh – Nagler 17 pass from Layne (Layne kick)

==== Week 10 (Sunday November 29, 1959): Philadelphia Eagles ====
| | 1 | 2 | 3 | 4 | Total |
|---|---|---|---|---|---|
| Eagles | 0 | 0 | 0 | 0 | **0** |
| **Steelers** | 3 | 7 | 7 | 14 | **31** |

at Forbes Field, Pittsburgh, Pennsylvania

- Game time:
- Game weather:
- Game attendance: 22,191
- Referee:
- TV announcers:

Scoring drives:

- Pittsburgh – FG Layne 17
- Pittsburgh – Dial 12 pass from Layne (Layne kick)
- Pittsburgh – Orr 19 pass from Layne (Layne kick)
- Pittsburgh – Tracy 23 pass from Layne (Layne kick)
- Pittsburgh – Nagler 2 pass from Layne (Layne kick)

==== Week 11 (Sunday December 5, 1959): Chicago Bears ====
| | 1 | 2 | 3 | 4 | Total |
|---|---|---|---|---|---|
| **Bears** | 6 | 14 | 7 | 0 | **27** |
| Steelers | 0 | 7 | 7 | 7 | **21** |

at Forbes Field, Pittsburgh, Pennsylvania

- Game time:
- Game weather:
- Game attendance: 41,476
- Referee:
- TV announcers:

Scoring drives:

- Chicago Bears – Casares 3 run (kick failed)
- Chicago Bears – Casares 1 run (Aveni kick)
- Chicago Bears – Casares 1 run (Aveni kick)
- Pittsburgh – Tracy 2 run (Layne kick)
- Chicago Bears – Casares 1 run (Aveni kick)
- Pittsburgh – Krutko 7 run (Layne kick)
- Pittsburgh – Dial 25 pass from Layne (Layne kick)

==== Week 12 (Sunday December 12, 1959): Chicago Cardinals ====
| | 1 | 2 | 3 | 4 | Total |
|---|---|---|---|---|---|
| Cardinals | 6 | 0 | 7 | 7 | **20** |
| **Steelers** | 0 | 28 | 7 | 0 | **35** |

at Forbes Field, Pittsburgh, Pennsylvania

- Game time:
- Game weather:
- Game attendance: 19,011
- Referee:
- TV announcers:

Scoring drives:

- Chicago Cardinals – FG Conrad 37
- Chicago Cardinals – FG Conrad 20
- Pittsburgh – Layne 9 run (Layne kick)
- Pittsburgh – Dial 35 pass from Layne (Layne kick)
- Pittsburgh – Dial 11 pass from Layne (Layne kick)
- Pittsburgh – Tracy 16 pass from Layne (Layne kick)
- Chicago Cardinals – Conrad 21 pass from Hill (Conrad kick)
- Pittsburgh – Orr 16 pass from Layne (Layne kick)
- Chicago Cardinals – Crow 7 pass from Hill (Conrad kick)

== Standings ==
NFL Eastern Conference
| | W | L | T | PCT | CONF | PF | PA | STK |
|---|---|---|---|---|---|---|---|---|
| New York Giants | 10 | 2 | 0 | .833 | 8–2 | 284 | 170 | W4 |
| Philadelphia Eagles | 7 | 5 | 0 | .583 | 6–4 | 268 | 278 | L1 |
| Cleveland Browns | 7 | 5 | 0 | .583 | 6–4 | 270 | 214 | W1 |
| Pittsburgh Steelers | 6 | 5 | 1 | .545 | 6–4 | 257 | 216 | W1 |
| Washington Redskins | 3 | 9 | 0 | .250 | 2–8 | 185 | 350 | L5 |
| Chicago Cardinals | 2 | 10 | 0 | .167 | 2–8 | 234 | 324 | L6 |

Note: Tie games were not officially counted in the standings until 1972.

== Roster ==
1959 Pittsburgh Steelers roster
| Quarterbacks (QB): 16 Len Dawson; 22 Bobby Layne K; Running backs (RB): 43 Tom Barnett; 34 Leo Elter; 39 Larry Krutko; 30 Tom Tracy; Wide receivers (WR): 88 Pete Brewster; 83 Buddy Dial; 25 Ray Mathews; 84 Gern Nagler; 86 Jimmy Orr P; Tight ends (TE) | Offensive linemen (OL): 57 Ed Beatty C; 61 Ted Karras T/G; 65 John Nisby G; 62 Mike Sandusky G; 74 Frank Varrichione T; Defensive linemen (DL): 72 Byron Beams DT/T; 73 Ray Fisher DT/T; 75 Joe Krupa DT; 71 Joe Lewis DT; 77 Billy Ray Smith DE; 70 Ernie Stautner DE; 82 George Tarasovic DE | Linebackers (LB): 66 Dick Campbell OLB/C; 60 Dale Dodrill MLB; 35 Rudy Hayes OLB; 68 Mike Henry MLB; 89 Dick Lasse OLB; 50 John Reger OLB; Defensive backs (DB): 42 Dick Alban CB; 80 Jack Butler S; 27 Dean Derby CB; 26 Ron Hall S/CB; 24 Bobby Luna S/P; 20 Don Sutherin S; Special teams (ST) | Reserve: 20 Jack Call RB (IR); 87 Cy McClairen WR (IR); -- Burley Polk T (Military); Rookies in italics |
