= 1959 Baltimore Colts season =

7th season in franchise history; second NFL Championship win

- Owner: Carroll Rosenbloom
- General manager: Don "Red" Kellett
- Head coach: Weeb Ewbank
- Home stadium: Memorial Stadium

Results
- Record: 9–3
- Division place: 1st NFL Western
- Playoffs: Won NFL Championship (vs. Giants) 31–16

The 1959 Baltimore Colts season was the seventh season for the team in the National Football League. The defending champion Baltimore Colts finished the NFL's 40th season with a record of 9 wins and 3 losses and finished first in the Western Conference, and defeated the New York Giants, 31–16 in the NFL championship game, which was the rematch of the previous season's classic title game, for their second consecutive NFL title.

The Colts led the entire NFL with 374 points scored in their 12 games — an average of 31.2 points per contest. The team scored at least 21 points in every game played during the 1959 season.

Colts quarterback Johnny Unitas had one of the great seasons by a passer in NFL history. Says Cold Hard Football Facts, "[Unitas's] 32 scoring strikes was an NFL record — he was the first and only to top 30 [touchdowns] in the NFL's first 40 years — and remains the standard for a 12-game season. He was in the midst of his record 47-game streak with a touchdown pass, and connected on at least one in every game of 1959."

The Colts defeated the Green Bay Packers twice this season in Vince Lombardi's first year as head coach. Baltimore did not win the Western title again until 1964 and their next NFL title came in 1968.

== Regular season ==
For the 1959 season the Colts offered seats in three price tiers. Field seats cost $5.00, while field boxes, the upper grandstand, and part of the lower grandstand were priced at $4. Less desirable lower grandstand seats cost $3.50. Prices of ticket booklets for the full season ranged from $30 for best seats, $24 for mid-range seats, and $21 for least expensive.

=== Schedule ===
| Game | Date | Opponent | Result | Record | Venue | Attendance | Recap | Sources |
|---|---|---|---|---|---|---|---|---|
| 1 | September 27 | **Detroit Lions** | **W** 21–9 | 1–0 | Memorial Stadium | 55,588 | Recap | |
| 2 | October 3 | **Chicago Bears** | **L** 21–26 | 1–1 | Memorial Stadium | 57,557 | Recap | |
| 3 | October 11 | at **Detroit Lions** | **W** 31–24 | 2–1 | Briggs Stadium | 54,197 | Recap | |
| 4 | October 18 | at **Chicago Bears** | **W** 21–7 | 3–1 | Wrigley Field | 48,430 | Recap | |
| 5 | October 25 | **Green Bay Packers** | **W** 38–21 | 4–1 | Memorial Stadium | 57,557 | Recap | |
| 6 | November 1 | Cleveland Browns | **L** 31–38 | 4–2 | Memorial Stadium | 57,557 | Recap | |
| 7 | November 8 | at Washington Redskins | **L** 24–27 | 4–3 | Griffith Stadium | 32,773 | Recap | |
| 8 | November 15 | at **Green Bay Packers** | **W** 28–24 | 5–3 | Milwaukee County Stadium | 25,521 | Recap | |
| 9 | November 22 | **San Francisco 49ers** | **W** 45–14 | 6–3 | Memorial Stadium | 57,557 | Recap | |
| 10 | November 29 | **Los Angeles Rams** | **W** 35–21 | 7–3 | Memorial Stadium | 57,557 | Recap | |
| 11 | December 5 | at **San Francisco 49ers** | **W** 34–14 | 8–3 | Kezar Stadium | 59,075 | Recap | |
| 12 | December 12 | at **Los Angeles Rams** | **W** 45–26 | 9–3 | L.A. Memorial Coliseum | 65,528 | Recap | |
Note: Intra-conference opponents are in **bold** text.

=== Standings ===
NFL Western Conference
| | W | L | T | PCT | CONF | PF | PA | STK |
|---|---|---|---|---|---|---|---|---|
| Baltimore Colts | 9 | 3 | 0 | .750 | 9–1 | 374 | 251 | W5 |
| Chicago Bears | 8 | 4 | 0 | .667 | 6–4 | 252 | 196 | W7 |
| San Francisco 49ers | 7 | 5 | 0 | .583 | 5–5 | 255 | 237 | L2 |
| Green Bay Packers | 7 | 5 | 0 | .583 | 6–4 | 248 | 246 | W4 |
| Detroit Lions | 3 | 8 | 1 | .273 | 2–8 | 203 | 275 | L1 |
| Los Angeles Rams | 2 | 10 | 0 | .167 | 2–8 | 242 | 315 | L8 |

Note: Tie games were not officially counted in the standings until 1972.

== Postseason ==
The 1959 NFL championship game was played on December 27 at Memorial Stadium in Baltimore, Maryland. The game was a rematch of the previous year's title game that went into overtime. The 1959 game was the 27th annual NFL championship game. The Colts beat the Giants 31–16, earning their second consecutive NFL championship over the Giants.

| Round | Date | Opponent | Result | Record | Venue | Attendance | Recap | Sources |
|---|---|---|---|---|---|---|---|---|
| Championship | December 27 | New York Giants | W 31–16 | 1–0 | Memorial Stadium | 57,545 | Recap | |

== Roster ==
1958 Baltimore Colts roster
| Quarterbacks: 19 Johnny Unitas; Running backs: 35 Alan Ameche; 25 Alex Hawkins; 43 Hal Lewis; 24 Lenny Moore; 31 Billy Pricer; 26 Mike Sommer; Receivers: 82 Raymond Berry; 84 Jim Mutscheller; 87 Jerry Richardson | Offensive linemen: 50 Buzz Nutter C; 77 Jim Parker T; 79 Sherman Plunkett T; 60 George Preas T; 68 Alex Sandusky G; 63 Art Spinney G; Defensive linemen: 81 Ordell Braase DE; 85 Ed Cook DE; 70 Art Donovan DT; 83 Don Joyce DE; 78 Ray Krouse DT/DE; 76 Gene Lipscomb DT; 89 Gino Marchetti DE | Linebackers: 64 Marv Matuszak MLB; 36 Bill Pellington OLB; 44 Bert Rechichar OLB; 61 Don Shinnick OLB; 52 Dick Szymanski MLB; Defensive backs: 17 Ray Brown S/QB; 20 Milt Davis CB; 80 Andy Nelson S; 47 Johnny Sample S; 41 Jackie Simpson CB; 23 Carl Taseff CB; Special teams: 65 Steve Myhra K/G; 86 Dave Sherer P/WR | Reserve list: 45 L. G. Dupre RB (IR); 21 Art DeCarlo CB/WR (IR); -- Hogan Wharton G (Inactive); 55 Leo Sanford LB (Retired); rookies in italics |

== Awards and honors ==
- Johnny Unitas, Bert Bell Award

== See also ==
- History of the Indianapolis Colts
- Indianapolis Colts seasons
- Colts–Patriots rivalry
