= 1959 Detroit Lions season =

NFL team season

- Head coach: George Wilson
- Home stadium: Briggs Stadium

Results
- Record: 3–8–1
- Division place: 5th NFL Western
- Playoffs: Did not qualify

The 1959 NFL season was the 30th year of the Detroit Lions in the National Football League (NFL). The team failed to improve on their previous season's output of 4–7–1, winning only three games. They missed the playoffs for the second straight season.

== Regular season ==
According to the team, a total of 41,029 season tickets were sold by the Lions for the 1959 campaign. The Lions played their home games in Briggs Stadium (Tiger Stadium), which had a regular listed seating capacity of 46,194, with an additional 7,000 bleacher seats for football to bring total capacity to 53,194.

For the 1959 season the Lions offered box seat tickets for $6.00, upper grandstand seats for $4.50, lower grandstand seats for $3.50, and bleacher seats for $2.00. Season tickets were similarly tiered, with prices of $36, $27, $21, and $12 for the full slate of six home games.

=== Schedule ===
Game	Date	Opponent	Result	Record	Venue	Attendance	Recap	Sources
1	September 27	at **Baltimore Colts**	L 9–21	0–1	Memorial Stadium	55,588	Recap	
2	October 4	at **Green Bay Packers**	L 10–28	0–2	New City Stadium	32,150	Recap	
3	October 11	**Baltimore Colts**	L 24–31	0–3	Briggs Stadium	54,197	Recap	
4	October 18	**San Francisco 49ers**	L 13–34	0–4	Briggs Stadium	52,585	Recap	
5	October 25	at **Los Angeles Rams**	W 17–7	1–4	L.A. Memorial Coliseum	74,288	Recap	
6	November 1	at **San Francisco 49ers**	L 7–33	1–5	Kezar Stadium	59,064	Recap	
7	November 8	at Pittsburgh Steelers	T 10–10	1–5–1	Forbes Field	24,614	Recap	
8	November 15	**Los Angeles Rams**	W 23–17	2–5–1	Briggs Stadium	52,217	Recap	
9	November 22	**Chicago Bears**	L 14–24	2–6–1	Briggs Stadium	54,059	Recap	
10	November 26	**Green Bay Packers**	L 17–24	2–7–1	Briggs Stadium	49,221	Recap	
11	December 6	Chicago Cardinals	W 45–21	3–7–1	Briggs Stadium	45,811	Recap	
12	December 13	at **Chicago Bears**	L 14–25	3–8–1	Wrigley Field	40,890	Recap	
Note: Intra-conference opponents are in **bold** text. November 26: Thanksgiving

== Standings ==
NFL Western Conference
	W	L	T	PCT	CONF	PF	PA	STK
Baltimore Colts	9	3	0	.750	9–1	374	251	W5
Chicago Bears	8	4	0	.667	6–4	252	196	W7
San Francisco 49ers	7	5	0	.583	5–5	255	237	L2
Green Bay Packers	7	5	0	.583	6–4	248	246	W4
Detroit Lions	3	8	1	.273	2–8	203	275	L1
Los Angeles Rams	2	10	0	.167	2–8	242	315	L8

Note: Tie games were not officially counted in the standings until 1972.

== Roster ==
Detroit Lions 1958 roster
Quarterbacks: 14 Earl Morrall; 18 Tobin Rote; Running backs: 40 Howard Cassady; 35 John Henry Johnson; 45 Dan Lewis; 34 Ken Webb; Receivers: 88 Gene Cook; 83 Jim Doran; 80 Jim Gibbons; 84 Dave Middleton; 87 Jerry Reichow QB	Offensive linemen: 50 Charlie Ane C/T; 76 Lou Creekmur T; 75 John Gordy G/T; 60 Bob Grottkau G; 64 Mike Rabold G; 66 Harley Sewell G; 76 Ollie Spencer T; Defensive linemen: 85 Gene Cronin DE/OLB; 53 Bill Glass DE/C; 71 Alex Karras DT; 72 Gil Mains DT/DE; 78 Darris McCord DE; 79 Gerry Perry DT/DE/K; 74 Jim Weatherall DT	Linebackers: 86 Bob Long OLB; 47 Jim Martin OLB/K; 56 Joe Schmidt MLB; 55 Wayne Walker OLB; Defensive backs: 41 Terry Barr CB/RB; 25 James David CB; 28 Yale Lary CB/S/P; 24 Dick LeBeau S; 43 Gary Lowe S; 20 Jim Steffen CB; 23 Dave Whitsell S/CB	Reserve lists: -- Hal Boutte WR (Military); 26 Gene Gedman RB (IR); 88 Steve Junker WR (IR); -- Ron Luciano T (IR); 33 Nick Pietrosante RB (IR); rookies in italics
