= 1959 New York Giants season =

NFL team season

- Owner: Jack Mara; Wellington Mara
- Head coach: Jim Lee Howell
- Home stadium: Yankee Stadium

Results
- Record: 10–2
- Division place: 1st NFL Eastern
- Playoffs: Lost NFL Championship (at Colts) 16–31

The 1959 New York Giants season was the franchise's 35th season in the National Football League. The Giants' defense became the second defense in the history of the NFL to lead the league in fewest rushing yards, fewest passing yards and fewest total yards. The 1959 Giants scored 284 points, more than in any of the previous four seasons in which Vince Lombardi was their offensive coordinator.

The Giants once again finished in first place with a record of 10–2 and advanced to the NFL Championship Game. In the rematch the Giants were soundly beaten 31–16 by the defending champion Baltimore Colts.

== Schedule ==
| Game | Date | Opponent | Result | Record | Venue | Attendance | Recap | Sources |
|---|---|---|---|---|---|---|---|---|
| 1 | September 26 | at Los Angeles Rams | **W** 23–21 | 1–0 | L.A. Memorial Coliseum | 71,297 | Recap | |
| 2 | October 4 | at **Philadelphia Eagles** | **L** 21–49 | 1–1 | Franklin Field | 27,023 | Recap | |
| 3 | October 11 | at **Cleveland Browns** | **W** 10–6 | 2–1 | Cleveland Municipal Stadium | 65,534 | Recap | |
| 4 | October 18 | **Philadelphia Eagles** | **W** 24–7 | 3–1 | Yankee Stadium | 68,783 | Recap | |
| 5 | October 25 | at **Pittsburgh Steelers** | **W** 21–16 | 4–1 | Forbes Field | 33,596 | Recap | |
| 6 | November 1 | Green Bay Packers | **W** 20–3 | 5–1 | Yankee Stadium | 68,837 | Recap | |
| 7 | November 8 | **Chicago Cardinals** | **W** 9–3 | 6–1 | Yankee Stadium | 56,779 | Recap | |
| 8 | November 15 | **Pittsburgh Steelers** | **L** 9–14 | 6–2 | Yankee Stadium | 66,786 | Recap | |
| 9 | November 22 | at **Chicago Cardinals** | **W** 30–20 | 7–2 | Metropolitan Stadium | 26,625 | Recap | |
| 10 | November 29 | **Washington Redskins** | **W** 45–14 | 8–2 | Yankee Stadium | 60,982 | Recap | |
| 11 | December 6 | **Cleveland Browns** | **W** 48–7 | 9–2 | Yankee Stadium | 68,436 | Recap | |
| 12 | December 13 | at **Washington Redskins** | **W** 24–10 | 10–2 | Griffith Stadium | 26,198 | Recap | |
Note: Intra-conference opponents are in **bold** text.

== Standings ==
NFL Eastern Conference
| | W | L | T | PCT | CONF | PF | PA | STK |
|---|---|---|---|---|---|---|---|---|
| New York Giants | 10 | 2 | 0 | .833 | 8–2 | 284 | 170 | W4 |
| Philadelphia Eagles | 7 | 5 | 0 | .583 | 6–4 | 268 | 278 | L1 |
| Cleveland Browns | 7 | 5 | 0 | .583 | 6–4 | 270 | 214 | W1 |
| Pittsburgh Steelers | 6 | 5 | 1 | .545 | 6–4 | 257 | 216 | W1 |
| Washington Redskins | 3 | 9 | 0 | .250 | 2–8 | 185 | 350 | L5 |
| Chicago Cardinals | 2 | 10 | 0 | .167 | 2–8 | 234 | 324 | L6 |

Note: Tie games were not officially counted in the standings until 1972.

== Roster ==
1959 New York Giants roster
| Quarterbacks (QB): 42 Charlie Conerly; 11 Don Heinrich; 15 George Shaw; Running backs (RB): 16 Frank Gifford; 24 Phil King; 40 Joe Morrison; 33 Mel Triplett; 29 Alex Webster; Wide receivers (WR): 80 Joe Biscaha; 44 Kyle Rote; 85 Bob Schnelker; Tight ends (TE) | Offensive linemen (OL): 68 Al Barry G; 79 Rosey Brown T; 62 Darrell Dess G; 60 Buzz Guy T/G; 71 Ellison Kelly G; 78 Bob Schmidt C/T/DE/DT; 66 Jack Stroud G; 55 Ray Wietecha C; 72 Frank Youso T; Defensive linemen (DL): 76 Rosey Grier DT; 74 Art Hauser DT; 75 Jim Katcavage DE/DT; 77 Dick Modzelewski DT; 81 Andy Robustelli DE | Linebackers (LB): 70 Sam Huff MLB; 89 Cliff Livingston OLB; 84 Harland Svare OLB; 82 Tom Scott OLB/DE; Defensive backs (DB): 41 Lindon Crow CB; 22 Dick Lynch CB; 25 Dick Nolan S; 20 Jimmy Patton S; 48 Bill Stits CB/S; Special teams (ST): 34 Don Chandler P/K; 88 Pat Summerall K/WR | Reserve: -- Lee Grosscup QB (Inactive); 31 George Scott RB (Inactive); Rookies in italics |

== Playoffs ==
Program for the 1959 Championship Game, held in Baltimore.

| Round | Date | Opponent | Result | Venue | Attendance | Recap | Sources |
|---|---|---|---|---|---|---|---|
| Championship | December 27 | at Baltimore Colts | L 16–31 | Memorial Stadium | 57,545 | Recap | |

== Awards and honors ==
- Don Chandler, Franchise Record, Highest Punting Average, 48.6 Yards per Punt
- Charley Conerly, NFL MVP

== See also ==
- List of New York Giants seasons
