= 1959 Los Angeles Rams season =

NFL team season

- Head coach: Sid Gillman
- Home stadium: Los Angeles Memorial Coliseum

Results
- Record: 2–10
- Division place: 6th NFL Western
- Playoffs: Did not qualify

Uniform
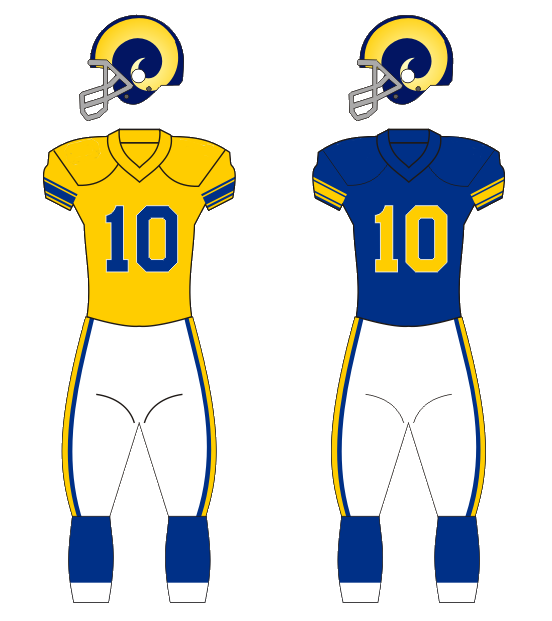

The 1959 Los Angeles Rams season was the team's 22nd year with the National Football League and the 14th season in Los Angeles. The team finished the year on an eight-game losing skid, with a record of 2–10, tied with the Chicago Cardinals for the worst in the NFL.

== Schedule ==
For the 1959 season the Rams offered a unitary seat price of $3.90 for their home games at Memorial Coliseum. Seat location was a function of the size of package purchased, however, with seats located from goal line to goal line available to those purchasing a 10 game package (including the six regular season games and four exhibition games) for $39. Seats located behind the goal line rising back behind the end zone were available as six game regular season packages for $23.40.

Game	Date	Opponent	Result	Record	Venue	Attendance	Recap	Sources
1	September 26	New York Giants	**L** 21–23	0–1	L.A. Memorial Coliseum	71,297	Recap	
2	October 4	at **San Francisco 49ers**	**L** 0–34	0–2	Kezar Stadium	56,028	Recap	
3	October 11	at **Chicago Bears**	**W** 28–21	1–2	Wrigley Field	47,036	Recap	
4	October 18	at **Green Bay Packers**	**W** 45–6	2–2	Milwaukee County Stadium	36,194	Recap	
5	October 25	**Detroit Lions**	**L** 7–17	2–3	L.A. Memorial Coliseum	74,288	Recap	
6	November 1	**Chicago Bears**	**L** 21–26	2–4	L.A. Memorial Coliseum	77,943	Recap	
7	November 8	**San Francisco 49ers**	**L** 16–24	2–5	L.A. Memorial Coliseum	94,376	Recap	
8	November 15	at **Detroit Lions**	**L** 17–23	2–6	Briggs Stadium	52,271	Recap	
9	November 22	at Philadelphia Eagles	**L** 20–23	2–7	Franklin Field	47,425	Recap	
10	November 29	at **Baltimore Colts**	**L** 21–35	2–8	Memorial Stadium	57,557	Recap	
11	December 6	**Green Bay Packers**	**L** 20–38	2–9	L.A. Memorial Coliseum	61,044	Recap	
12	December 12	**Baltimore Colts**	**L** 26–45	2–10	L.A. Memorial Coliseum	65,528	Recap	
Note: Intra-conference opponents are in **bold** text. Saturday night: Sept. 26.

== Standings ==
NFL Western Conference
	W	L	T	PCT	CONF	PF	PA	STK
Baltimore Colts	9	3	0	.750	9–1	374	251	W5
Chicago Bears	8	4	0	.667	6–4	252	196	W7
San Francisco 49ers	7	5	0	.583	5–5	255	237	L2
Green Bay Packers	7	5	0	.583	6–4	248	246	W4
Detroit Lions	3	8	1	.273	2–8	203	275	L1
Los Angeles Rams	2	10	0	.167	2–8	242	315	L8

Note: Tie games were not officially counted in the standings until 1972.

== Roster ==
Los Angeles Rams roster
Quarterbacks: 10 Buddy Humphrey; 15 Frank Ryan; 9 Bill Wade; Running backs: 26 Jon Arnett; 34 Joe Marconi; 33 Ollie Matson; 24 Tommy Wilson; Receivers: 84 Leon Clarke; 82 Jim Phillips; 29 Del Shofner P	Offensive linemen: 79 Charlie Bradshaw T; 71 Paul Dickson T; 75 Bob Fry T/G; 62 John Houser G; 63 Buck Lansford G; 51 John Morrow C/G; 61 Duane Putnam G; 70 Gene Selawski T; Defensive linemen: 74 John Baker DT/DE; 85 Lamar Lundy DE/WR; 76 John LoVetere DT; 83 Lou Michaels DE/DT/K; 77 George Strugar DT; 88 Sam Williams DE	Linebackers: 65 John Guzik MLB; 57 Bill Jobko OLB; 32 Jack Pardee OLB; 48 Les Richter MLB/C; 35 Roy Wilkins OLB; Defensive backs: 25 Don Burroughs S; 81 Tom Franckhauser CB; 31 Carl Karilivacz CB/S; 21 Eddie Meador CB; 40 Jack Morris S/CB/K; 43 Will Sherman S; 46 Clendon Thomas S/CB/RB	Reseve list: 80 Gene Brito DE (IR); -- Roy Hord G (Military); Rookies in italics
