= 1960 New York Giants season =

NFL team season

- Owner: Jack Mara; Wellington Mara
- Head coach: Jim Lee Howell
- Home stadium: Yankee Stadium

Results
- Record: 6–4–2
- Division place: 3rd NFL Eastern
- Playoffs: Did not qualify

The 1960 New York Giants season was the franchise's 36th season in the National Football League. The Mara family was opposed to the AFL adding a team in New York, but received an indemnity fee of ten million dollars.

== Offseason ==
With the departure of defensive coordinator Tom Landry to the expansion Cowboys, three veterans served dual roles as player-coaches. Harland Svare became the defensive coordinator, Andy Robustelli was a defensive line coach, while Jimmy Patton was a defensive backs coach.

=== NFL draft ===
1960 New York Giants draft
Round	Pick	Player	Position	College	Notes
1	12	Lou Cordileone	Guard	Clemson	
3	36	Jim Leo	Linebacker	Cincinnati	
6	72	George Blair	Defensive back	Ole Miss	
7	84	Bob Yates	Tackle	Syracuse	
8	96	Fred Hageman	Center	Kansas	
9	108	Bob Anderson	Halfback	Army	Made roster in 1963
10	120	Bob Simms	Tight end	Rutgers	
Made roster

== Roster ==
1960 New York Giants roster
Quarterbacks (QB): 42 Charlie Conerly P; 11 Lee Grosscup; 15 George Shaw; Running backs (RB): 26 Ed Sutton; 33 Mel Triplett; 29 Alex Webster; Wide receivers (WR): 24 Phil King; 40 Joe Morrison; 44 Kyle Rote; 86 Bill Kimber; Tight ends (TE): 85 Bob Schnelker; 83 Bob Simms	Offensive linemen (OL): 78 Don Boll T/G; 79 Rosey Brown T; 74 Lou Cordileone G; 60 Bill Crawford G; 62 Darrell Dess G; 52 Bob Schmidt C/T; 66 Jack Stroud G; 55 Ray Wietecha C; 72 Frank Youso T; Defensive linemen (DL): 76 Rosey Grier DT; 73 Proverb Jacobs DT; 77 Dick Modzelewski DT; 81 Andy Robustelli DE; 82 Tom Scott DE	Linebackers (LB): 70 Sam Huff MLB; 30 Jim Leo OLB; 89 Cliff Livingston OLB; 84 Harland Svare OLB; Defensive backs (DB): 41 Lindon Crow CB; 22 Dick Lynch CB; 25 Dick Nolan SS; 20 Jimmy Patton FS; 21 Lee Riley SS; 48 Bill Stits CB/FS; Special teams (ST): 34 Don Chandler P; 88 Pat Summerall K	Practice squad: Pete Hall QB; Edward Mazurek T; Reserve: 16 Frank Gifford RB (IR); -- Bill Gorman T (Military); 75 Jim Katcavage DE (IR); Rookies in italics

== Regular season ==
Late in the eighth game of the season on November 20 at Yankee Stadium, linebacker Chuck Bednarik of the Philadelphia Eagles knocked halfback Frank Gifford of the Giants unconscious and into St. Elizabeth's Hospital. Gifford was out of football for over eighteen months and the game-sealing play involving the two hall of famers is considered one of the most famous tackles in NFL history. The Giants went 6–4–2 in 1960 and finished in third place in the Eastern Conference. As a result, the Giants missed out on the post-season: the NFL Championship Game was won by host Philadelphia. The third place game in Miami, the first of the ten Playoff Bowls, was won by Detroit at the Orange Bowl in early January.

=== Schedule ===
Game	Date	Opponent	Result	Record	Attendance	Recap
1	September 25	at San Francisco 49ers	**W** 21–19	1–0	44,598	Recap
2	October 2	at **St. Louis Cardinals**	**W** 35–14	2–0	26,089	Recap
3	October 9	at **Pittsburgh Steelers**	**W** 19–17	3–0	40,323	Recap
4	October 16	**Washington Redskins**	**T** 24–24	3–0–1	60,625	Recap
—	Bye					
5	October 30	**St. Louis Cardinals**	**L** 13–20	3–1–1	58,516	Recap
6	November 6	at **Cleveland Browns**	**W** 17–13	4–1–1	82,872	Recap
7	November 13	**Pittsburgh Steelers**	**W** 27–24	5–1–1	63,321	Recap
8	November 20	**Philadelphia Eagles**	**L** 17-10	5–2–1	63,571	Recap
9	November 27	at **Philadelphia Eagles**	**L** 23–31	5–3–1	60,547	Recap
10	December 4	Dallas Cowboys	**T** 31–31	5–3–2	55,033	Recap
11	December 11	at **Washington Redskins**	**W** 17–3	6–3–2	14,077	Recap
12	December 18	**Cleveland Browns**	**L** 34–48	6–4–2	56,517	Recap
Note: Intra-conference opponents in **bold** text. Bye-week needed with expansion to odd number of teams (13) — one team idle per week.

=== Standings ===
Program for the November 20 game against the Philadelphia Eagles. In this game Giants star Frank Gifford suffered a season-ending concussion at the hands of linebacker Chuck Bednarik.

NFL Eastern Conference
	W	L	T	PCT	CONF	PF	PA	STK
Philadelphia Eagles	10	2	0	.833	8–2	321	246	W1
Cleveland Browns	8	3	1	.727	6–3–1	362	217	W3
New York Giants	6	4	2	.600	5–4–1	271	261	L1
St. Louis Cardinals	6	5	1	.545	4–5–1	288	230	W1
Pittsburgh Steelers	5	6	1	.455	4–5–1	240	275	L1
Washington Redskins	1	9	2	.100	0–8–2	178	309	L8

Note: Tie games were not officially counted in the standings until 1972.

== See also ==
- List of New York Giants seasons
