= 1960 Cleveland Browns season =

NFL team season

- Head coach: Paul Brown
- Home stadium: Cleveland Stadium

Results
- Record: 8–3–1
- Division place: 2nd NFL Eastern
- Playoffs: Lost NFL Playoff Bowl (vs. Lions) 16–17
- Pro Bowlers: Ray Renfro, FL; Bernie Parrish, CB; Milt Plum, QB; Bobby Mitchell, HB; Mike McCormack, RT; Jim Ray Smith, G Jim Brown, FB

The 1960 Cleveland Browns season was the team's 11th season with the National Football League. The 1960 Browns compiled an 8–3–1 record, and finished second in the NFL's Eastern Conference, behind the NFL champion Philadelphia Eagles. As runner-up, the Browns qualified for the inaugural third place Playoff Bowl in Miami, but lost 17–16 to the Detroit Lions on January 7.

== Preseason ==
Game	Date	Opponent	Result	Record	Venue	Attendance	Sources
1	August 13	at Detroit Lions	W 28–14	1–0	Briggs Stadium	24,620	
2	August 18	at Pittsburgh Steelers	W 27–24	2–0	Pitt Stadium	16,360	
3	August 27	at Los Angeles Rams	L 17–22	2–1	L.A. Memorial Coliseum	48,175	
4	September 3	vs. San Francisco 49ers	W 26–24	3–1	Multnomah Stadium (Portland, OR)	25,898	
5	September 10	vs. Chicago Bears	W 16–10	4–1	Rubber Bowl (Akron, OH)	21,568	
6	September 17	Detroit Lions	W 14–10	5–1	Cleveland Stadium	25,911	

== Regular season ==
A bye week was necessary in 1960, as the league expanded to an odd-number (13) of teams (Dallas); one team was idle each week.

=== Schedule ===
Game	Date	Opponent	Time	Result	Record	Venue	Attendance	Recap
1	September 25	at **Philadelphia Eagles**	1:30 p.m. EDT	**W** 41–24	1–0	Franklin Field	56,303	
2	October 2	**Pittsburgh Steelers**	2:00 p.m. EDT	**W** 28–20	2–0	Cleveland Stadium	67,692	
—	Bye							
3	October 16	at Dallas Cowboys	2:30 p.m. EST	**W** 48–7	3–0	Cotton Bowl	28,500	
4	October 23	**Philadelphia Eagles**	2:00 p.m. EST	**L** 29–31	3–1	Cleveland Stadium	64,850	
5	October 30	at **Washington Redskins**	2:00 p.m. EST	**W** 31–10	4–1	Griffith Stadium	32,086	
6	November 6	**New York Giants**	2:00 p.m. EST	**L** 13–17	4–2	Cleveland Stadium	82,872	
7	November 13	**St. Louis Cardinals**	2:00 p.m. EST	**W** 28–27	5–2	Cleveland Stadium	49,192	
8	November 20	at **Pittsburgh Steelers**	2:00 p.m. EST	**L** 10–14	5–3	Forbes Field	35,215	
9	November 27	at **St. Louis Cardinals**	2:00 p.m. EST	**T** 17–17	5–3–1	Busch Stadium I	26,146	
10	December 4	**Washington Redskins**	2:00 p.m. EST	**W** 27–16	6–3–1	Cleveland Stadium	35,211	
11	December 11	Chicago Bears	2:00 p.m. EST	**W** 42–0	7–3–1	Cleveland Stadium	38,155	
12	December 18	at **New York Giants**	2:00 p.m. EST	**W** 48–34	8–3–1	Yankee Stadium	56,517	
Note: Intra-conference opponents are in **bold** text.

=== Standings ===
NFL Eastern Conference
	W	L	T	PCT	CONF	PF	PA	STK
Philadelphia Eagles	10	2	0	.833	8–2	321	246	W1
Cleveland Browns	8	3	1	.727	6–3–1	362	217	W3
New York Giants	6	4	2	.600	5–4–1	271	261	L1
St. Louis Cardinals	6	5	1	.545	4–5–1	288	230	W1
Pittsburgh Steelers	5	6	1	.455	4–5–1	240	275	L1
Washington Redskins	1	9	2	.100	0–8–2	178	309	L8

Note: Tie games were not officially counted in the standings until 1972.

== Final statistics ==
=== Statistical comparison ===
	Cleveland Browns	Opponents
First downs	219	208
First downs rushing	107	92
First downs passing	96	102
First downs penalty	16	14
Total net yards	3974	3806
Avg. Per Game	331.2	317.2
Total Plays	647	724
Avg. Per Play	6.1	5.3
Net yards rushing	1930	1643
Avg. Per Game	160.8	136.9
Rushing attempts	383	405
Net yards passing	2044	2163
Avg. Per Game	170.3	180.3
Times sacked-total yards	37–299	26–209
Gross yards	2343	2370
Passing – Completions/attempts	160?264	163/319
Completion Pct.	60.6	51.1
Interceptions thrown	5	31
Punts-average yardage	55–42.0	46–45.0
Net Punting Avg.	55–38.7	46–40.5
Penalties-total yards	49–534	48–526
Fumbles-lost	20–12	27–14
Touchdowns	47	26
Touchdown rushing	18	10
Touchdown passing	22	15
Touchdown returns	7	1

Boxscore

Quarter-by-quarter
	1	2	3	4	T
Browns	59	150	58	95	362
Opponents	41	60	48	68	217

== Postseason ==
Round	Date	Opponent	Time	Result	Record	Venue	Attendance	Recap
Playoff Bowl	January 7, 1961	vs. Detroit Lions	2:00 p.m. EST	L 16–17	0–1	Orange Bowl	34,981	

== Personnel ==
=== Roster ===
1960 Cleveland Browns roster
Quarterbacks: 18 Len Dawson; 16 Milt Plum; Running backs: 32 Jim Brown; 36 Jamie Caleb; 40 Prentice Gautt; 49 Bobby Mitchell; Wide receivers: 88 Rich Kreitling; 87 Fred Murphy; 26 Ray Renfro; Tight ends: 81 Leon Clarke; 86 Gern Nagler; 85 A. D. Williams	Offensive linemen: 54 Bob Denton T/LB; 66 Gene Hickerson G; 74 Mike McCormack T; 56 John Morrow C; 77 Dick Schafrath T; 78 Gene Selawski T/G; 64 Jim Ray Smith G; 60 John Wooten G; Defensive linemen: 79 Bob Gain DT; 82 Jim Houston DE; 80 Jim Marshall DE; 72 Floyd Peters DT; 70 Jim Prestel DT; 68 Larry Stephens DT; 84 Paul Wiggin DE	Linebackers: 52 Dave Lloyd OLB/MLB; 35 Galen Fiss OLB; 50 Vince Costello MLB; 34 Walt Michaels OLB; Defensive backs: 20 Ross Fichtner CB/S; 46 Don Fleming SS; 24 Bobby Franklin FS; 22 Rich Mostardi FS; 30 Bernie Parrish CB; 44 Jim Shofner CB; Special teams: 38 Sam Baker P	Reserve: 76 Lou Groza K (Retired); rookies in italics

=== Staff/coaches ===
1960 Cleveland Browns staff
Front office: Majority owner/CEO & president – Dave R. Jones; Minority owner/vice president – Ellis Ryan; Minority owner/vice president – Homer Marshman; Minority owner/vice president – Saul Silberman; Coaches: Head coach – Paul Brown; Offensive coaches: Quarterbacks/running backs – Howard Brinker; Offensive guards – Fritz Heisler; Offensive tackles – Ed Ulinski; Offensive backfield and ends – Paul Bixler	Defensive coaches: Defensive line – Dick Evans; Linebackers – Ed Ulinski; Strength & conditioning: Athletic trainer – Leo Murphy; Equipment manager – Morris Kono

=== Awards and records ===
- Jim Brown, NFL rushing leader, 1,257 yards
- Milt Plum, NFL leader, passing yards, (2,297)

=== Milestones ===
- Jim Brown, third consecutive 1,000 yard season
- Jim Brown, fourth consecutive rushing title
