= 1960 NFL Championship Game =

Championship game in 1960 of the National Football League

Coordinates: 39.95°N 75.19°W

Green Bay Packers (Western) (8–4)	Philadelphia Eagles (Eastern) (10–2)
13	17
Head coach: Vince Lombardi	Head coach: Buck Shaw
	1	2	3	4	Total
GB	3	3	0	7	13
PHI	0	10	0	7	17
- Date: December 26, 1960
- Stadium: Franklin Field; Philadelphia, Pennsylvania
- MVP: Norm Van Brocklin (Quarterback; Philadelphia)
- Attendance: 67,325

TV in the United States
- Network: NBC
- Announcers: Lindsey Nelson; Ray Scott

Radio in the United States
- Network: NBC
- Announcers: Jack Whitaker; Blaine Walsh

Location in the United States
Location in Pennsylvania

The 1960 NFL Championship Game was the 28th NFL title game, played between the Green Bay Packers and Philadelphia Eagles on the afternoon of Monday, December 26, at Franklin Field in Philadelphia.

Along with the landmark 1958 championship game, in which the Baltimore Colts defeated the New York Giants in sudden death overtime, the 1960 NFL Championship Game between the Packers and Eagles is considered a seminal game in professional football history.

The game marked the lone playoff defeat for Packers coach Vince Lombardi before his Packers team established a dynasty that won five NFL championships, including its first and second Super Bowls, in a span of seven seasons.

The victory was the third NFL title for the Philadelphia Eagles, but it would prove to be their last for another 57 years until February 4, 2018, when the Eagles defeated the New England Patriots 41–33 in Super Bowl LII.

The American Football League was in its first season, and held its inaugural title game less than a week later. First-year NFL Commissioner Pete Rozelle convinced owners to move the league's headquarters from Philadelphia to New York City, and with Congressional passage of the Sports Broadcasting Act of 1961, received an antitrust exemption that allowed the league to negotiate a common broadcasting network representing all of its teams, helping cement football's ascendancy as a national sport.

This was the second and last NFL Championship Game played in Philadelphia, and the only one at Franklin Field; the previous 1948 championship game, held in a snowstorm at Shibe Park, was also won by the Eagles.

Ticket prices for the game were ten and eight dollars. This was also the only year from 1958 to 1963 that did not include the New York Giants in the title game.

== Background ==
The game matched the league's conference champions, Philadelphia Eagles (10–2) of the East and Green Bay Packers (8–4) of the West. The Eagles were making their first appearance in a championship game since 1949, and the Packers their first since 1944. Two years earlier, both teams had finished last in their respective conferences.

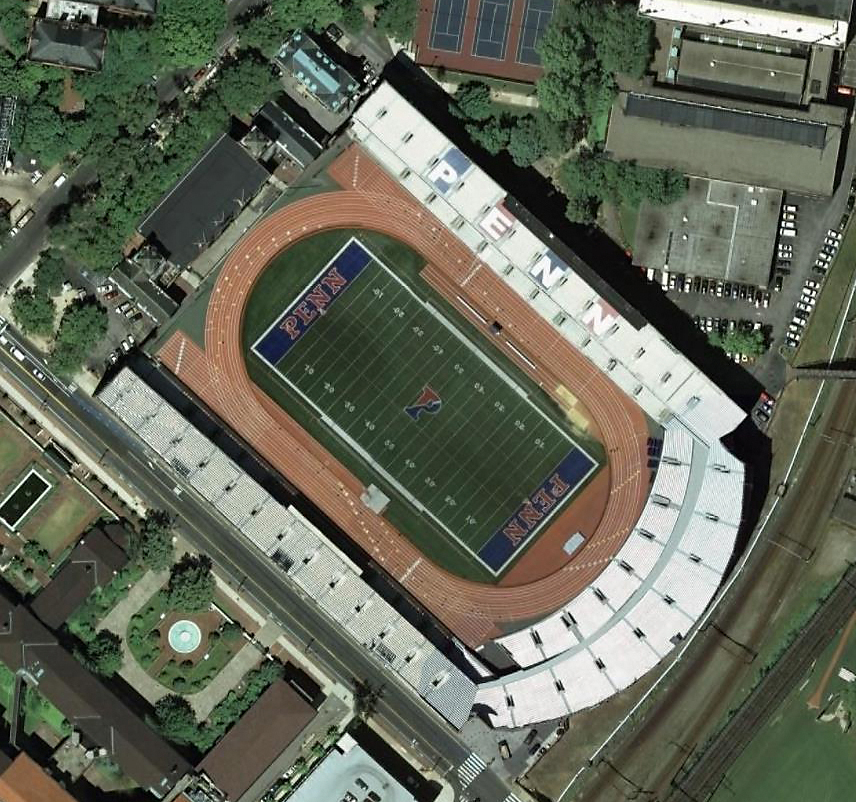
Franklin Field, venue of the 1960 NFL Championship Game.

Due to the lack of lights at Franklin Field, which were later installed in 1970, the game's kickoff time was moved up to 12 p.m. (noon) EST to allow for the possibility of sudden death overtime, which had occurred two years earlier. The game was also played on a Monday, as it had been in 1955, as the NFL did not want to play the game on Christmas.

Led by future hall of fame head coach Vince Lombardi, Green Bay won the Western Conference, a game ahead of the Detroit Lions and San Francisco 49ers. The two-time defending champion Baltimore Colts, led by quarterback Johnny Unitas, were 6–2 on November 13, but lost their last four and stumbled into fourth place with a .500 record. (Baltimore did not win another division/conference title until 1964.) Green Bay had won six league championships before, most recently in 1944, but the intervening years had been lean.

At the time, Lombardi was better known as an assistant coach (offense) for the New York Giants. Hired by the Packers in January 1959, he led them to a 7–5 record in his first season as a head coach, a vast improvement over the 1958 season (1–10–1), their worst ever. On the field, the Packers were led by quarterback Bart Starr, another future hall of famer but lightly regarded at the time, having thrown eight interceptions to go with his four touchdown passes in the 1960 season. Starr had shared playing time with Lamar McHan, who won all four games he started, while Starr was an even 4–4. In his four previous seasons in the league, Starr had more interceptions than touchdowns in each season and he finished the 1960 season with 1,358 passing yards, completing 98 of 172 passes for a completion percentage of 57.0. Other names that would shine during the dynasty the Packers built during the 1960s, such as halfback / placekicker Paul Hornung, linebacker Ray Nitschke, and fullback Jim Taylor, were all early in their careers and future hall of famers.

The 1960 game represented a chance for Philadelphia to add to the consecutive titles in 1948 and 1949, but they had declined to only two wins in 1958. Head coach Buck Shaw was in his third season with the Eagles, his final year as a head coach, and had turned around the team from a 2–9–1 record in 1958 to seven wins in 1959 to a conference championship and the league's best record in 1960. The Eagles were led on the field by 34-year-old quarterback Norm Van Brocklin, who was ranked second in the NFL with 2,471 passing yards and 24 passing touchdowns, behind Unitas of the Colts in both statistics, and was playing in his final game. Less than a month after the title game, he was named the head coach of the expansion Minnesota Vikings. Philadelphia had clinched the Eastern title early on December 4 at 9–1, and there was concern by Shaw that it could have an adverse effect on his team.

== Game summary ==
A capacity crowd of 67,325 gathered at Franklin Field, the home field of the University of Pennsylvania, with 7,000 temporary seats added. The Eagles were a two to three-point home underdog, and the game-time temperature was 48 °F (9 °C), creating difficult inconsistent field conditions for both teams, as the frozen playing surface thawed in spots leaving scattered puddles under the low winter sun. It had snowed several days earlier in Philadelphia, followed by cold temperatures, and the well-worn, nearly grassless field had been covered by a tarpaulin.

On the first play from scrimmage, a lateral from Van Brocklin deflected off the hands of receiver Billy Ray Barnes and was intercepted by Bill Quinlan of the Packers, giving Green Bay possession at the Philadelphia 14-yard line. After Jim Taylor gained five yards on first down, the Packers were unable to score, turning the ball over on downs to Philadelphia at the six-yard line. A fumble on the Eagles' third play after gaining possession by Bill Barnes was recovered by Bill Forester of Green Bay at the 22-yard line of Philadelphia. Two Paul Hornung rushes gave the Packers a first down at the 12-yard line, but two incomplete passes and another Hornung rush came up short. Lombardi elected to kick on fourth down, with Hornung connecting from twenty yards out to give the Packers a 3–0 lead.

Hornung kicked a second field goal in the opening minutes of the second quarter from 23 yards out, after a Packers drive stalled on the 17-yard line, putting Green Bay up by six points. On a pair of passes from Van Brocklin to Tommy McDonald of 22 yards and 35 yards respectively, the Eagles scored a touchdown and the extra point by kicker Bobby Walston gave them their first lead of the game. After getting the ball back from Green Bay, Van Brocklin connected on a pass of 41 yards to Pete Retzlaff that was followed three plays later by a 22-yard pass play to Ted Dean that put the Eagles on the Packers' eight-yard line. After three incomplete passes, a field goal gave the Eagles a 10–6 lead. On the following drive in the waning minutes of the first half, Green Bay took the ball to the Philadelphia seven-yard line. The threat fizzled after Bart Starr was sacked for a loss and the field goal attempt from just 13 yards by Hornung was wide left, a critical error in a low-scoring game.

A drive by the Packers in the third quarter advanced to the Philadelphia 34-yard line, but Green Bay failed to convert on fourth down, turning the ball over to the Eagles and losing Hornung to a shoulder injury. The Eagles promptly marched down deep into Green Bay territory but a Van Brocklin pass was intercepted in the end zone by John Symank. The touchback gave the Packers the ball on their own 20-yard line. In punt formation on fourth down, Max McGee ran for 35 yards to give Green Bay a first down in Philadelphia territory. Despite the successful run on the fake punt, Lombardi was not pleased, saying "We punt the ball; we don't run the ball" when the team sets up for a punt.

In the final quarter, continuing that same drive, the Packers advanced deep into Philadelphia territory on runs by backs Tom Moore and Taylor, then retook the lead with a seven-yard pass from Bart Starr to McGee with 13:07 left in the game. Hornung came off the bench to kick the extra point, giving Green Bay a 13–10 lead. On the ensuing kickoff, Ted Dean received the ball at the three-yard line and returned it 58 yards, giving Philadelphia excellent field position at the Green Bay 39-yard line. Dean provided what turned out to be the margin of victory for the Eagles with a five-yard touchdown run on a sweep led by a key block from guard Gerry Huth with 5:21 left, capping off a drive in which Van Brocklin passed the ball only once. On the Packers' next possession, McGee caught a short pass just beyond midfield, but was ruled to have fumbled, and the Eagles recovered. After a trade of punts, Philadelphia took over at their 26-yard line with just over three minutes remaining. Following three running plays and another punt, Green Bay started the final drive at their 35-yard line with 1:05 left, needing a touchdown.

A completion to Gary Knafelc ended with him tackled in bounds at the Eagles' thirty-yard line, and Green Bay used their final timeout with a half-minute left. On first down, Starr overthrew double-covered Boyd Dowler in the shady south corner of the end zone, stopping the clock with 25 seconds remaining. Knafelc caught a short pass on second down, but was quickly tackled in bounds at the 22, so the clock continued to run. Starr rushed to get the offense set for third down, then threw a short pass to fullback Taylor; it was caught on the run at the 17, but linebacker Bednarik, the last Eagle between Taylor and the end zone, tackled him at the Eagles' nine-yard line and remained on top of Taylor as the final seconds ticked off the clock, securing the Eagles the win and the championship. Bednarik had played both defense and offense, and was in for every play of the game; after the clock reached zero, he growled "You can get up now, Taylor. This damn game's over."

The Eagles won despite being outgained in the game 401 yards to 296, with only 13 first downs as compared to 22 for the Packers. It was the only career playoff loss for Packer head coach Lombardi (9–1), and was the last Eagles championship for 57 years, until Super Bowl LII in February 2018. Lombardi would later rue his decision to go on fourth down on several occasions deep in Philadelphia territory rather than attempt field goals on such plays, saying, "When you get down there, come out with something. I lost the game, not my players."

Van Brocklin was named the game's Most Valuable Player, despite completing only 9 of 20 passes, but for 204 yards, one touchdown and an interception.

=== Scoring summary ===
Philadelphia Eagles 17, Green Bay Packers 13

Quarter	1	2	3	4	Total
Packers	3	3	0	7	13
Eagles	0	10	0	7	17

at Franklin Field, Philadelphia, Pennsylvania

- Date: December 26, 1960
- Game time: 12:00 p.m. EST
- Game weather: 28 °F (−2 °C), wind 7 mph (11 km/h), wind chill 21 °F (−6 °C), relative humidity 84%
- Pro-Football-Reference

Game information
- First quarter
  - GB – Paul Hornung 20-yard field goal, Packers 3–0
- Second quarter
  - GB – Paul Hornung 23-yard field goal, 6–0 GB
  - PHI – Tommy McDonald 35-yard pass from Norm Van Brocklin (Bobby Walston kick). Eagles 7–6
  - PHI – Bobby Walston 15-yard field goal. Eagles 10–6
- Third quarter
  - No scoring
- Fourth quarter
  - GB – Max McGee 7-yard pass from Bart Starr (Hornung kick). Packers 13–10
  - PHI – Ted Dean 5-yard run (Walston kick). Eagles 17–13

Top passers

- GB – Bart Starr – 21/34, 178 yards, 1 TD
- PHI – Norm Van Brocklin – 9/20, 204 yards, 1 TD, 1 INT

Top rushers

- GB – Jim Taylor – 24 rushes, 105 yards
- PHI – Ted Dean – 13 rushes, 54 yards, 1 TD

Top receivers

- GB – Gary Knafelc – 6 receptions, 76 yards
- PHI – Tommy McDonald – 3 receptions, 90 yards, 1 TD

== Officials ==
- Referee: (5) Ron Gibbs
- Umpire: (57) Joe Connell
- Head linesman: John Highberger
- Back judge: Sam Giangreco
- Field judge: Herm Rohrig
- Alternate: (35) Art McNally
- Alternate: (20) Frank Sinkovitz
- Alternate: Charlie Berry
- Alternate: (29) Stan Jaworowski
- Alternate: Mike Lisetski

The NFL had five game officials in 1960; the line judge was added in 1965 and the side judge in 1978.

== Players' shares ==
The gross receipts for the game, including radio and television rights, were just under $748,000, the highest to date. Each player on the winning Eagles team received $5,116, while Packers players made $3,105 each.

== See also ==
- 1960 NFL season
- History of the NFL championship
- 1960 American Football League Championship Game

== Video ==
- "The National Football League Championship: Featuring The Green Bay Packers and the Philadelphia Eagles," via YouTube.com (Highlights.)

== Bibliography ==
- Gruver, Edward (2002), Nitschke. Lanham:Taylor Trade Publishing. ISBN 1-58979-127-4
