= 1960 Washington Redskins season =

NFL team season

- Owner: George Preston Marshall
- General manager: Dick McCann
- Head coach: Mike Nixon
- Home stadium: Griffith Stadium

Results
- Record: 1–9–2
- Division place: 6th NFL Eastern
- Playoffs: Did not qualify

The 1960 Washington Redskins season was the franchise's 29th season in the National Football League. The team failed to improve on their 3–9 record from 1959 and finished last-place in the NFL Eastern Conference, with a 1–9–2 record under second-year head coach Mike Nixon. The Redskins' only win that season was a 26–14 victory against the first-year expansionists Dallas Cowboys team on October 9 in Washington, who coincidentally went winless that season.

This season was also the last one in their old stadium, Griffith Stadium. After starting the year with 1 win, 1 loss, and 2 ties, the team went on to drop the final 8 contests of the year, finishing with the second worst record in the NFL. Following the season, the Redskins fired Mike Nixon, and replaced him with Bill McPeak.

The Redskins pursued once more their strategy of establishing themselves as the dominant NFL franchise of the Southern United States, broadcasting their games to a network of 19 television stations across Virginia, South Carolina, Alabama, Tennessee, Mississippi, and Florida. The team continued its "Days for Dixie" program of dedicated halftime shows, including "Virginia Day" on October 9 and "South Carolina Day" on October 30.

From the 1955 season until 1962, the Redskins were the last bastion of racial segregation in the NFL, refusing to include a single black player on their roster, unlike the other 12 teams in the league.

== Preseason ==
Week	Date	Opponent	Result	Record	Venue	Attendance
1	August 14	at San Francisco 49ers	L 7–31	0–1	Kezar Stadium	13,163
2	August 19	at Los Angeles Rams	L 21–26	0–2	Los Angeles Memorial Coliseum	57,025
3	August 27	vs. Philadelphia Eagles	L 6–24	0–3	Foreman Field (Norfolk, VA)	20,132
4	September 3	vs. Chicago Bears	L 0–17	0–4	Gator Bowl Stadium (Jacksonville, FL)	13,970
5	September 12	at Baltimore Colts	L 7–30	0–5	Baltimore Memorial Stadium	6,218
6	September 17	vs. Green Bay Packers	L 7–41	0–6	Bowman Gray Stadium (Winston-Salem, NC)	10,000

== Regular season ==
=== Schedule ===
Game	Date	Opponent	Result	Record	Venue	Attendance	Recap	Sources
1	September 25	at Baltimore Colts	**L** 0–20	0–1	Memorial Stadium	53,818	Recap	
—	Bye							
2	October 9	Dallas Cowboys	**W** 26–14	1–1	Griffith Stadium	21,142	Recap	
3	October 16	at **New York Giants**	**T** 24–24	1–1–1	Yankee Stadium	60,625	Recap	
4	October 23	**Pittsburgh Steelers**	**T** 27–27	1–1–2	Griffith Stadium	25,292	Recap	
5	October 30	**Cleveland Browns**	**L** 10–31	1–2–2	Griffith Stadium	32,086	Recap	
6	November 6	at **St. Louis Cardinals**	**L** 6–44	1–3–2	Busch Stadium	22,458	Recap	
7	November 13	at **Philadelphia Eagles**	**L** 13–19	1–4–2	Franklin Field	39,361	Recap	
8	November 20	**St. Louis Cardinals**	**L** 14–26	1–5–2	Griffith Stadium	23,848	Recap	
9	November 27	at **Pittsburgh Steelers**	**L** 10–22	1–6–2	Forbes Field	22,334	Recap	
10	December 4	at **Cleveland Browns**	**L** 16–27	1–7–2	Cleveland Municipal Stadium	35,211	Recap	
11	December 11	**New York Giants**	**L** 3–17	1–8–2	Griffith Stadium	14,077	Recap	
12	December 18	**Philadelphia Eagles**	**L** 28–38	1–9–2	Griffith Stadium	20,558	Recap	
Note: Intra-conference opponents are in **bold** text.

=== Standings ===
NFL Eastern Conference
	W	L	T	PCT	CONF	PF	PA	STK
Philadelphia Eagles	10	2	0	.833	8–2	321	246	W1
Cleveland Browns	8	3	1	.727	6–3–1	362	217	W3
New York Giants	6	4	2	.600	5–4–1	271	261	L1
St. Louis Cardinals	6	5	1	.545	4–5–1	288	230	W1
Pittsburgh Steelers	5	6	1	.455	4–5–1	240	275	L1
Washington Redskins	1	9	2	.100	0–8–2	178	309	L8

Note: Tie games were not officially counted in the standings until 1972.

== Roster ==
1960 Washington Redskins roster
Quarterbacks (QB): 19 Eagle Day P; 3 Ralph Guglielmi; 17 M. C. Reynolds; Running backs (RB): 31 Don Bosseler; 47 Dick James FS/SS; 0 Johnny Olszewski; 20 Ed Vereb; Wide receivers (WR): 42 Bill Anderson; 40 Sam Horner CB; 84 Tom Osborne; 24 Jim Podoley; Tight ends (TE): 81 Joe Walton	Offensive linemen (OL): 78 Don Lawrence T/DT; 70 Ray Lemek T; 61 Fran O'Brien G/T; 65 Vince Promuto G; 51 Jim Schrader C; 67 Red Stephens G; 66 Bob Whitlow T/G; Defensive linemen (DL): 77 Ray Krouse DT; 86 John Paluck DE; 76 Don Stallings DT; 71 Andy Stynchula DE; 79 Bob Toneff DT	Linebackers (LB): 63 Rod Breedlove MLB; 45 Ralph Felton OLB; 88 Dick Lasse OLB; 53 Bill Roehnelt MLB; 83 Roy Wilkins OLB/DE; Defensive backs (DB): 49 Billy Brewer FS; 22 Jim Crotty FS/OLB; 21 Gary Glick SS; 43 Dick Haley FS/WR; 82 Pat Heenan CB; 48 Ben Scotti CB; 32 Jim Wulff SS/CB; Special teams (ST): 60 Robert Khayat K/C	Reserve: Billy Roland LB (IR); Rookies in italics
