= 1960 San Francisco 49ers season =

American football team season

- Owner: Victor Morabito
- General manager: Louis Spadia
- Head coach: Red Hickey
- Home stadium: Kezar Stadium

Results
- Record: 7–5
- Division place: T–2nd NFL Western
- Playoffs: Did not qualify

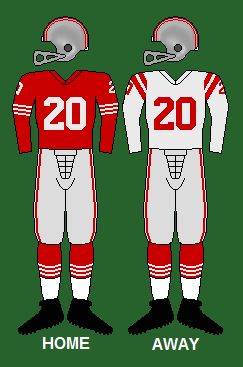
The uniform of the San Francisco 49ers, 1960-1961.

The 1960 San Francisco 49ers season was the franchise's 11th season in the National Football League and their 15th overall. The team was able to match their 7–5 output from the previous year. However, they again failed to make the playoffs. The season did have a silver lining, though, as the 49ers' defense was top-ranked in the league, allowing only 205 points.

The 49ers tied Detroit for second place in the Western Conference, a game behind the Green Bay Packers, but the Lions went to the inaugural third place Playoff Bowl in Miami in January. The teams had split their season series and the Lions won the tiebreaker based on points differential. The 49ers lost both games with Green Bay, the latter at home in the mud in December.

== Offseason ==
=== NFL draft ===
1960 San Francisco 49ers draft
Round	Pick	Player	Position	College	Notes
1	11	Monty Stickles	Tight end	Notre Dame	
2	16	Mike Magac	Guard	Missouri	
2	22	Carl Kammerer	Defensive end	Pacific	began play with 49ers in 1961.
3	35	Rod Breedlove *	Linebacker	Maryland	
4	46	Ray Norton	Halfback	San Jose State	
5	59	Len Rohde *	Tackle	Utah State	
6	70	Lee Murchison	Wide receiver	Pacific	
7	83	Bob Waters	Quarterback	Presbyterian	
8	88	Bill Mathis	Fullback	Clemson	
8	94	Max Fugler	Center	LSU	
9	107	Bobby Wasden	End	Auburn	
10	118	Mel Branch	Defensive end	LSU	signed with Dallas Texans (AFL)
11	126	Ed Pitts	Tackle	South Carolina	
11	131	Ernie Hansen	Center	Arizona State–Flagstaff	
12	142	Jim Williams	Guard	North Carolina	
13	155	Dean Hinshaw	Tackle	Stanford	
14	166	Gary Campbell	Back	Whittier	
15	179	Mike Dowdle	Linebacker	Texas	
16	190	Jim Heinke	Tackle	Wisconsin	
17	203	Goose Gonsoulin	Defensive back	Baylor	
18	214	Carl Robinson	Tackle	South Carolina State	
19	227	Bobby Pate	Back	Presbyterian	
20	238	Jim Woodward	Tackle	Lamar Tech	
Made roster * Made at least one Pro Bowl during career

== Personnel ==
=== Staff / Coaches ===
1960 San Francisco 49ers staff
Front office: Team Owner - Victor Morabito; General manager – Louis Spadia; Head coaches: Head coach - Red Hickey; Offensive coaches: Chief of Offense / Offensive Line Coach - Bill Johnson; Offensive Ends / Assistant Coach – Billy Wilson	Defensive coaches: Defensive Backs - Mark Duncan; Defensive Backfield - Jack Christiansen; Special teams coaches: None - N/A

=== Roster ===
1960 San Francisco 49ers roster
Quarterbacks (QB): 12 John Brodie; 14 Y. A. Tittle; 11 Bob Waters; Running backs (RB): 39 Hugh McElhenny; 23 Ray Norton; 32 C. R. Roberts; 34 Joe Perry; 24 J. D. Smith; Wide receivers (WR): 88 Clyde Conner; 27 R. C. Owens; Tight ends (TE): 87 Dee Mackey; 85 Monty Stickles	Offensive linemen (OL): 77 Bruce Bosley C; 64 Ted Connolly G; 62 Mike Magac G; 53 Frank Morze C/DT; 76 Len Rohde T; 52 Karl Rubke C; 79 Bob St. Clair T; 78 John Thomas T; Defensive linemen (DL): 63 Monte Clark DT/T; 86 Dan Colchico DE; 70 Charlie Krueger; 73 Leo Nomellini DT; 74 Henry Schmidt DT; 82 Jerry Wilson DE	Linebackers (LB): 54 Bob Harrison MLB; 55 Matt Hazeltine OLB; 75 Ed Henke MLB; 83 Gorden Kelley OLB; 33 Clancy Osborne OLB; Defensive backs (DB): 25 Dave Baker SS; 44 Eddie Dove FS; 26 Lenny Lyles CB; 80 Jerry Mertens CB; 42 Jimmy Ridlon SS; 40 Abe Woodson CB; Special teams (ST): 36 Tommy Davis K/P	Practice squad: None; Reserve: -- Max Fugler C (IR); -- Bill Lopaskey G (IR); 84 Billy Wilson WR (Retired); Rookies in italics

== Preseason ==
Week	Date	Opponent	Result	Record	Venue
1	August 6	vs. Dallas Cowboys	W 16–10	1–0	Husky Stadium
2	August 14	Washington Redskins	W 31–7	2–0	Kezar Stadium
3	August 21	Philadelphia Eagles	W 45–28	3–0	Kezar Stadium
4	September 3	vs. Cleveland Browns	L 24–26	3–1	Multnomah Stadium
5	September 9	at Los Angeles Rams	L 17–28	3–2	Los Angeles Memorial Coliseum
6	September 18	St. Louis Cardinals	L 17–24	3–3	Kezar Stadium

== Schedule ==
Week	Date	Opponent	Result	Record	Venue	Attendance
1	September 25	New York Giants	**L** 19–21	0–1	Kezar Stadium	44,598
2	October 2	**Los Angeles Rams**	**W** 13–9	1–1	Kezar Stadium	53,633
3	October 9	at **Detroit Lions**	**W** 14–10	2–1	Tiger Stadium	49,825
4	October 16	at **Chicago Bears**	**L** 10–27	2–2	Wrigley Field	48,226
5	October 23	at **Green Bay Packers**	**L** 14–41	2–3	Milwaukee County Stadium	39,914
6	October 30	**Chicago Bears**	**W** 25–7	3–3	Kezar Stadium	55,071
7	November 6	**Detroit Lions**	**L** 0–24	3–4	Kezar Stadium	48,447
8	Bye					
9	November 20	at Dallas Cowboys	**W** 26–14	4–4	Cotton Bowl	10,000
10	November 27	at **Baltimore Colts**	**W** 30–22	5–4	Memorial Stadium	57,808
11	December 4	at **Los Angeles Rams**	**W** 23–7	6–4	Los Angeles Memorial Coliseum	77,254
12	December 10	**Green Bay Packers**	**L** 0–13	6–5	Kezar Stadium	53,612
13	December 18	**Baltimore Colts**	**W** 34–10	7–5	Kezar Stadium	57,269
Note: Intra-conference opponents are in **bold** text.

Note: A bye week was necessary in 1960, as the league expanded to an odd number (13) of teams (Dallas); one team was idle each week.

== Standings ==
NFL Western Conference
	W	L	T	PCT	CONF	PF	PA	STK
Green Bay Packers	8	4	0	.667	7–4	332	209	W3
Detroit Lions	7	5	0	.583	7–4	239	212	W4
San Francisco 49ers	7	5	0	.583	7–4	208	205	W1
Baltimore Colts	6	6	0	.500	5–6	288	234	L4
Chicago Bears	5	6	1	.455	5–5–1	194	299	L3
Los Angeles Rams	4	7	1	.364	4–6–1	265	297	L1
Dallas Cowboys	0	11	1	.000	0–6	177	369	L1

Note: Tie games were not officially counted in the standings until 1972.
