= Willard Dewveall =

American gridiron football player (1936–2006)

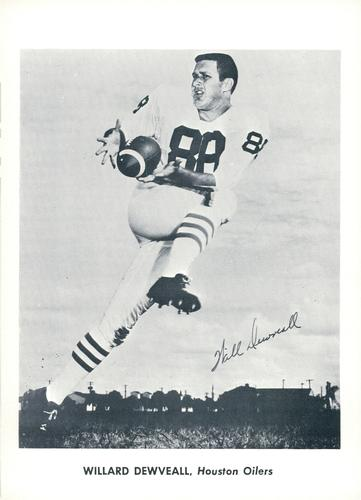

No. 72, 88
- Position: End

Personal information
- Born: April 29, 1936; Springtown, Texas, U.S.
- Died: November 20, 2006 (aged 70); Houston, Texas, U.S.
- Listed height: 6 ft 4 in (1.93 m)
- Listed weight: 224 lb (102 kg)

Career information
- High school: Weatherford (Weatherford, Texas)
- College: SMU (1954–1957)
- NFL draft: 1958: 2nd round, 18th overall pick

Career history
- Winnipeg Blue Bombers (1958); Chicago Bears (1959–1960); Houston Oilers (1961-1964)

Awards and highlights
- Grey Cup champion (1958); AFL champion (1961); AFL All-Star (1962); Second-team All-SWC (1957)

Career NFL/AFL statistics
- Receptions: 204
- Receiving yards: 3,304
- Receiving touchdowns: 27
- Stats at Pro Football Reference

Willard Charles Dewveall (Pronounced: DOO-vawl) (April 29, 1936 – November 20, 2006) was an American football end. He was the first player to jump from the National Football League (NFL) to the American Football League (AFL).

He left the Chicago Bears of the NFL after the 1960 season to play for the AFL champion Houston Oilers. He was the only one to switch leagues for five years, until kicker Pete Gogolak went from the AFL to the NFL in 1966.

In 1962, Dewveall caught the (then) longest pass reception for a touchdown in professional football history, 98 yards, from Jacky Lee, against the San Diego Chargers. It is still the longest receiving touchdown in Houston Oilers/Tennessee Titans franchise history. He was an American Football League All-Star in 1962.

He was Dandy Don's favorite receiver, and All-American at SMU. Selected by the Bears in the second round of the 1958 NFL draft, Dewveall played a year in the Canadian Football League (CFL) with the Winnipeg Blue Bombers in 1958 under head coach Bud Grant, and they won the Grey Cup. He returned to the United States and played for the Bears for two seasons in 1959 and 1960.

== NFL/AFL career statistics ==
Legend
	Led the league
**Bold**	Career high

=== Regular season ===
Year	Team	Games		Receiving				
Year	Team	GP	GS	Rec	Yds	Avg	Lng	TD
1959	CHI	11	6	20	420	**21.0**	76	3
1960	CHI	12	12	43	**804**	18.7	91	5
1961	HOU	7	1	12	200	16.7	66	3
1962	HOU	14	6	33	576	17.5	**98**	5
1963	HOU	14	14	**58**	752	13.0	35	**7**
1964	HOU	14	8	38	552	14.5	60	4
		72	47	204	3,304	16.2	98	27

=== Playoffs ===
Year	Team	Games		Receiving				
Year	Team	GP	GS	Rec	Yds	Avg	Lng	TD
1961	HOU	1	1	2	10	5.0	11	0
1962	HOU	1	1	**6**	**95**	**15.8**	**24**	**1**
		2	2	8	105	13.1	24	1

== See also ==
- List of American Football League players
