= 1958 Calgary Stampeders season =

Canadian football team season

- General manager: Jim Finks
- Head coach: Otis Douglas
- Home stadium: Mewata Stadium

Results
- Record: 6–9–1
- Division place: 4th, W.I.F.U.
- Playoffs: did not qualify

The 1958 Calgary Stampeders finished in fourth place in the W.I.F.U. with a 6–9–1 record and failed to make the playoffs.

== Preseason ==
=== Schedule ===
| Game | Date | Opponent | Results | | Venue | Attendance |
| Game | Date | Opponent | Score | Record | Venue | Attendance |
|---|---|---|---|---|---|---|
| A | Sat, July 26 | at BC Lions | W 18–17 | 1–0 | Empire Stadium | 13,381 |
| B | Wed, Aug 6 | at Toronto Argonauts | W 21–13 | 2–0 | Varsity Stadium | 8,506 |
| C | Fri, Aug 8 | at Sarnia Golden Bears | W 33–1 | 3–0 | | 5,000 |

== Regular season ==
=== Season standings ===
Western Interprovincial Football Union
| Team | GP | W | L | T | PF | PA | Pts |
|---|---|---|---|---|---|---|---|
| Winnipeg Blue Bombers | 16 | 13 | 3 | 0 | 361 | 182 | 26 |
| Edmonton Eskimos | 16 | 9 | 6 | 1 | 312 | 292 | 19 |
| Saskatchewan Roughriders | 16 | 7 | 7 | 2 | 320 | 324 | 16 |
| Calgary Stampeders | 16 | 6 | 9 | 1 | 314 | 312 | 13 |
| BC Lions | 16 | 3 | 13 | 0 | 202 | 399 | 6 |

=== Season schedule ===
| Game | Date | Opponent | Results | | Venue | Attendance |
| Game | Date | Opponent | Score | Record | Venue | Attendance |
|---|---|---|---|---|---|---|
| 1 | Mon, Aug 18 | vs. BC Lions | W 42–0 | 1–0 | Mewata Stadium | 15,133 |
| 2 | Sat, Aug 23 | vs. Edmonton Eskimos | W 35–7 | 2–0 | Mewata Stadium | 17,770 |
| 3 | Mon, Aug 25 | at BC Lions | W 34–13 | 3–0 | Empire Stadium | 26,358 |
| 4 | Mon, Sept 1 | vs. Winnipeg Blue Bombers | W 11–3 | 4–0 | Mewata Stadium | 17,750 |
| 5 | Mon, Sept 8 | at Edmonton Eskimos | L 28–32 | 4–1 | Clarke Stadium | 20,000 |
| 6 | Sat, Sept 13 | vs. Winnipeg Blue Bombers | L 7–20 | 4–2 | Mewata Stadium | 15,700 |
| 7 | Mon, Sept 15 | at Saskatchewan Roughriders | L 7–30 | 4–3 | Taylor Field | 13,012 |
| 8 | Sat, Sept 20 | at Winnipeg Blue Bombers | L 9–36 | 4–4 | Winnipeg Stadium | 20,059 |
| 9 | Sat, Sept 27 | vs. BC Lions | W 29–15 | 5–4 | Mewata Stadium | 14,500 |
| 10 | Sat, Oct 4 | vs. Saskatchewan Roughriders | L 14–22 | 5–5 | Mewata Stadium | 18,000 |
| 11 | Mon, Oct 6 | at BC Lions | L 14–15 | 5–6 | Empire Stadium | 18,574 |
| 12 | Sat, Oct 11 | at Edmonton Eskimos | L 10–17 | 5–7 | Clarke Stadium | 15,000 |
| 13 | Mon, Oct 13 | vs. Edmonton Eskimos | L 14–19 | 5–8 | Mewata Stadium | 10,000 |
| 14 | Sat, Oct 18 | at Saskatchewan Roughriders | W 21–17 | 6–8 | Taylor Field | 10,148 |
| 15 | Sat, Oct 25 | vs. Saskatchewan Roughriders | T 29–29 | 6–8–1 | Mewata Stadium | 13,500 |
| 16 | Mon, Oct 27 | at Winnipeg Blue Bombers | L 10–37 | 6–9–1 | Winnipeg Stadium | 15,564 |

== Awards and records ==
- CFL's Most Outstanding Lineman Award – Don Luzzi (OT/DT)
