= 1960 Chicago Bears season =

NFL team season

- Owner: George Halas
- General manager: George Halas
- Head coach: George Halas
- Home stadium: Wrigley Field

Results
- Record: 5–6–1
- Division place: 5th NFL Western
- Playoffs: Did not qualify

The 1960 Chicago Bears season was their 41st regular season completed in the National Football League. The team finished with a 5–6–1 record under George Halas, finishing fifth in the NFL Western Conference, a game below .500, a rare sight under a Halas coached team. The Bears lost all three games in December by significant margins, the last two being shutouts.

== Offseason ==
=== NFL draft ===
1960 Chicago Bears draft
Round	Pick	Player	Position	College	Notes
1	5	Roger Davis	Guard	Syracuse	
3	32	Don Meredith *	Quarterback	SMU	
4	43	Billy Martin	Halfback	Minnesota	
5	57	Dick Norman	Quarterback	Stanford	
6	68	Ed Kovac	Halfback	Cincinnati	
7	79	Charlie Bivins	Running back	Morris Brown	
8	93	Pete Manning	Defensive back	Wake Forest	
9	104	Ken Kirk	Linebacker	Ole Miss	
11	128	Stan Fanning	Tackle	Idaho	
11	129	Glenn Shaw	Fullback	Kentucky	
12	140	Tom Budrewicz	Tackle	Brown	
13	151	Bob Spada	End	Duke	
14	165	Jim Sorey	Defensive tackle	Texas Southern	
15	176	Warren Lashua	Back	Whitworth	
16	187	Bo Farrington	Tight end	Prairie View A&M	
17	201	Jim Hanna	End	USC	
18	212	Claude King	Running back	Houston	
19	223	Lloyd Roberts	Tackle	Georgia	
20	237	Angelo Coia	Wide receiver	USC	
Made roster * Made at least one Pro Bowl during career

=== Undrafted free agents ===
1960 undrafted free agents of note
Player	Position	College
Bill deColigny	Tackle	Trinity

== Roster ==
1960 Chicago Bears roster
Quarterbacks (QB): 12 Zeke Bratkowski P; 15 Ed Brown P; Running backs (RB): 39 John Adams; 35 Rick Casares; 36 Merrill Douglas; 28 Willie Galimore; 29 Glenn Shaw; Wide receivers (WR): 49 Charlie Bivins; 46 Angelo Coia; 43 Jim Dooley; 87 Harlon Hill; 47 Johnny Morris; Tight ends (TE): 88 Willard Dewveall; 84 Bo Farrington	Offensive linemen (OL): 60 Roger Davis G; 65 Stan Fanning T; 78 Stan JonesG; 67 Ted Karras G; 54 Roger LeClerc C; 70 Herman Lee T; 76 John Mellekas C; 63 Bob Wetoska T; Defensive linemen (DL): 81 Doug Atkins DE; 73 Bill Bishop DT; 74 Bob Kilcullen DE/DT; 71 Earl Leggett DE; 75 Fred Williams DT	Linebackers (LB): 31 Joe Fortunato OLB; 61 Bill George MLB; 53 Ken Kirk OLB; 33 Larry Morris OLB; Defensive backs (DB): 24 Erich Barnes CB; 25 J. C. Caroline CB; 86 Pete Manning SS; 17 Richie Petitbon SS; 25 Charlie Sumner FS; 48 Vic Zucco CB/FS; Special teams (ST): 89 John Aveni K	Reserve: -- Tom Budrewicz G (IR); -- Chuck Howley LB (IR); 20 Justin Rowland CB (IR); 82 Maury Youmans DE (IR); Rookies in italics

== Schedule ==
=== Preseason ===
Week	Date	Opponent	Result	Record	Venue	Attendance	Sources
1	August 15	vs. **New York Giants**	**W** 16–7	1–0	Varsity Stadium (Toronto)	5,401	
2	August 27	at **Green Bay Packers**	**L** 7–35	1–1	Milwaukee County Stadium	36,116	
3	September 3	vs. **Washington Redskins**	**W** 17–0	2–1	Gator Bowl (Jacksonville)	13,970	
4	September 10	at **Cleveland Browns**	**L** 10–16	2–2	Rubber Bowl (Akron, OH)	25,000	
5	September 16	**Pittsburgh Steelers**	**T** 21–21	2–2–1	Soldier Field	38,602	

=== Regular season ===
Week	Date	Opponent	Result	Record	Venue	Attendance	Sources
1	September 25	at **Green Bay Packers**	**W** 17–14	1–0	City Stadium	32,150	
2	October 2	at **Baltimore Colts**	**L** 7–42	1–1	Memorial Stadium	57,808	
3	October 9	**Los Angeles Rams**	**W** 34–27	2–1	Wrigley Field	47,776	
4	October 16	**San Francisco 49ers**	**W** 27–10	3–1	Wrigley Field	48,226	
5	October 23	at **Los Angeles Rams**	**T** 24–24	3–1–1	Los Angeles Memorial Coliseum	63,438	
6	October 30	at **San Francisco 49ers**	**L** 7–25	3–2–1	Kezar Stadium	55,071	
7	Bye						
8	November 13	**Baltimore Colts**	**L** 20–24	3–3–1	Wrigley Field	48,713	
9	November 20	**Detroit Lions**	**W** 28–7	4–3–1	Wrigley Field	46,267	
10	November 27	**Dallas Cowboys**	**W** 17–7	5–3–1	Wrigley Field	39,951	
11	December 4	**Green Bay Packers**	**L** 13–41	5–4–1	Wrigley Field	46,406	
12	December 11	at Cleveland Browns	**L** 0–42	5–5–1	Cleveland Municipal Stadium	38,155	
13	December 18	at **Detroit Lions**	**L** 0–36	5–6–1	Briggs Stadium	51,017	
Note: Intra-conference opponents are in **bold** text.

- A bye week was necessary in 1960, as the league expanded to an odd number (13) of teams (Dallas); one team was idle each week.

=== Game summaries ===
==== Week 1 at Packers ====
Week One: Chicago Bears (0–0) at Green Bay Packers (0–0)

Quarter	1	2	3	4	Total
**Bears**	0	0	0	17	**17**
Packers	0	7	7	0	**14**

at New City Stadium, Green Bay, Wisconsin

- Date: September 25
- Game weather: 60 °F (16 °C)
- Game attendance: 32,150
- Box Score

Game information

**First quarter**

- No scoring

**Second quarter**

- GB – Jim Taylor 1-yard run (Paul Hornung kick). Packers 7–0. Drive:

**Third quarter**

- GB – Paul Hornung 2-yard run (Paul Hornung kick). Packers 14–0. Drive:

**Fourth quarter**

- CHI – Willie Galimore 18-yard run (John Aveni kick). Packers 14–7. Drive:
- CHI – Rick Casares 26-yard run (John Aveni kick). Tie 14–14. Drive:
- CHI – John Aveni 16-yard field goal. Bears 17–14. Drive:

Top passers

- CHI – Zeke Bratkowski – 13/24, 178 yards, 2 INT
- GB – Bart Starr – 8/22, 68 yards, 2 INT

Top rushers

- CHI – Rick Casares – 20 rushes, 79 yards, TD
- GB – Jim Taylor – 16 rushes, 83 yards, TD

Top receivers

- CHI – Willard Dewveall – 6 receptions, 97 yards
- GB – Boyd Dowler – 4 receptions, 45 yards

==== Week 9 ====
Team	1	2	3	4	Total
Cowboys	0	0	7	0	7
• Bears	7	7	0	3	17

- Date: November 27
- Location: Wrigley Field, Chicago, Illinois
- Game weather: 54 °F (12 °C), wind 14 mph (23 km/h)

Scoring summary
1	CHI	Rick Casares 5 yard run (John Aveni kick)	Bears 7–0
2	CHI	Johnny Morris 20 yard pass from Ed Brown (John Aveni kick)	Bears 14–0
3	DAL	Don McIlhenny 64 yard pass from Don Heinrich (Fred Cone kick)	Bears 14–7
4	CHI	John Aveni 20 yard field goal	Bears 17–7

== Standings ==
NFL Western Conference
	W	L	T	PCT	CONF	PF	PA	STK
Green Bay Packers	8	4	0	.667	7–4	332	209	W3
Detroit Lions	7	5	0	.583	7–4	239	212	W4
San Francisco 49ers	7	5	0	.583	7–4	208	205	W1
Baltimore Colts	6	6	0	.500	5–6	288	234	L4
Chicago Bears	5	6	1	.455	5–5–1	194	299	L3
Los Angeles Rams	4	7	1	.364	4–6–1	265	297	L1
Dallas Cowboys	0	11	1	.000	0–6	177	369	L1

Note: Tie games were not officially counted in the standings until 1972.
