= 1958 Ottawa Rough Riders season =

Canadian football team season

- Head coach: Frank Clair
- Home stadium: Lansdowne Park

Results
- Record: 6–8
- Division place: 3rd, IRFU
- Playoffs: Lost East Finals

The 1958 Ottawa Rough Riders finished in third place in the IRFU with a 6–8 record but lost to the Hamilton Tiger-Cats in the East Finals. This was also the Rough Riders' first season in the Canadian Football League as the league was formed in this year.

== Preseason ==
Game	Date	Opponent	Results		Venue	Attendance
Game	Date	Opponent	Score	Record	Venue	Attendance
B	Fri, Aug 1	vs. Saskatchewan Roughriders	W 29–28	1–0	Lansdowne Park	10,000
C	Thu, Aug 7	vs. BC Lions	W 33–27	2–0	Lansdowne Park	7,000
C	Mon, Aug 11	vs. Edmonton Eskimos	W 26–6	3–0	Lansdowne Park	9,000

== Regular season ==
=== Standings ===
Interprovincial Rugby Football Union
Team	GP	W	L	T	PF	PA	Pts
Hamilton Tiger-Cats	14	10	3	1	291	235	21
Montreal Alouettes	14	7	6	1	265	269	15
Ottawa Rough Riders	14	6	8	0	233	243	12
Toronto Argonauts	14	4	10	0	266	308	8

=== Schedule ===
Week	Game	Date	Opponent	Results		Venue	Attendance
Week	Game	Date	Opponent	Score	Record	Venue	Attendance
1	1	Tue, Aug 19	vs. Toronto Argonauts	W 44–7	1–0	Lansdowne Park	18,470
1	2	Sat, Aug 23	at Hamilton Tiger-Cats	L 7–13	1–1	Civic Stadium	21,297
2	3	Sat, Aug 30	at Montreal Alouettes	L 9–11	1–2	McGill Stadium	22,943
3	4	Sat, Sept. 6	vs. Montreal Alouettes	W 17–1	2–2	Lansdowne Park	17,056
4	5	Sun, Sept 14	Hamilton Tiger-Cats	L 18–24	2–3	Philadelphia Municipal Stadium	15,110
5	6	Sat, Sept 20	at Toronto Argonauts	W 17–14	3–3	Varsity Stadium	20,166
6	7	Sat, Sept 27	vs. Toronto Argonauts	W 28–4	4–3	Lansdowne Park	18,500
7	8	Sat, Oct 4	vs. Hamilton Tiger-Cats	L 1–14	4–4	Lansdowne Park	18,000
8	9	Sat, Oct 11	vs. Montreal Alouettes	W 41–7	5–4	Lansdowne Park	15,000
8	10	Mon, Oct 13	at Montreal Alouettes	L 13–34	5–5	McGill Stadium	24,133
9	11	Sat, Oct 18	vs. Toronto Argonauts	L 0–41	5–6	Lansdowne Park	14,313
10	12	Sat, Oct 25	at Toronto Argonauts	L 24–42	5–7	Varsity Stadium	23,334
11	13	Sat, Nov 1	vs. Hamilton Tiger-Cats	W 14–8	6–7	Lansdowne Park	13,603
12	14	Sat, Nov 8	at Hamilton Tiger-Cats	L 0–23	6–8	Civic Stadium	14,874

== Postseason ==
=== Playoffs ===
Round	Date	Opponent	Results		Venue	Attendance
Round	Date	Opponent	Score	Record	Venue	Attendance
East Semi-Final	Wed, Nov 12	vs. Montreal Alouettes	W 26–12	1–0	McGill Stadium	18,048
East Final #1	Sat, Nov 15	vs. Hamilton Tiger-Cats	L 7–35	1–1	Lansdowne Park	10,490
East Final #2	Sat, Nov 22	at Hamilton Tiger-Cats	L 7–19	1–2	Civic Stadium	15,671
