= Vern Valdez =

American football player (1935–1981)

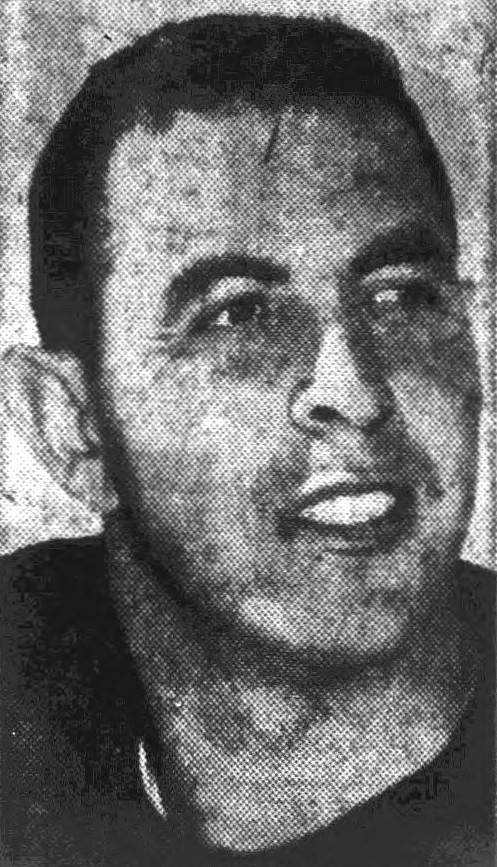
- Valdez, circa 1963

No. 47, 25
- Position: Defensive back/Quarterback

Personal information
- Born: August 12, 1938; Los Angeles County, California
- Died: June 26, 1981 (aged 42)
- Listed height: 6 ft 0 in (1.83 m)
- Listed weight: 190 lb (86 kg)

Career information
- High school: Palmdale High School
- College: Antelope Valley JC; San Diego

Career history
- Los Angeles Rams (1960); Buffalo Bills (1961); Oakland Raiders (1962–1963)
- Stats at Pro Football Reference

Vernon Valdez Jr. (August 12, 1935 – June 26, 1981) was a professional American football defensive back in the American Football League for the Buffalo Bills (1961) and the Oakland Raiders (1962–1963). He also played in the National Football League for the Los Angeles Rams in 1960. Valdez was a JC All-American at Antelope Valley Junior College, played quarterback at the University of San Diego, and was the quarterback for the Marine Corps Recruit Depot San Diego Devil Dogs in 1958 and 1959.

== See also ==
- Other American Football League players
