= Bill Crawford (gridiron football) =

Canadian gridiron football player (born 1937)

No. 60
- Position: Guard

Personal information
- Born: July 17, 1937 (age 89); New Westminster, British Columbia
- Listed height: 6 ft 2 in (1.88 m)
- Listed weight: 235 lb (107 kg)

Career information
- University: British Columbia
- NFL draft: 1960: undrafted

Career history
- New York Giants (1960)
- Stats at Pro Football Reference

William Crawford (born July 17, 1937) is a Canadian former professional football offensive lineman who played in the National Football League (NFL). Crawford played CIS football for the UBC Thunderbirds. After graduation in 1960, he signed with the New York Giants. He played four games for the Giants and became one of the first U Sports players to compete in the NFL.
