= 1958 Winnipeg Blue Bombers season =

Canadian football team season

- General manager: Jim Ausley
- President: Ralph Parliament
- Head coach: Bud Grant
- Home stadium: Winnipeg Stadium

Results
- Record: 13–3
- Division place: 1st, WIFU
- Playoffs: Won Grey Cup

The 1958 Winnipeg Blue Bombers was the 26th season of the franchise. It was the first for the team under the newly formed Canadian Football League that joined its two unions (WIFU and IRFU) into a league. Winnipeg finished in first place in the WIFU division with a 13–3 record. In a rematch of the previous season's Grey Cup Final, the Blue Bombers defeated the Hamilton Tiger-Cats to win the 46th Grey Cup, and their first since 1941.

== Preseason ==
Game	Date	Opponent	Results		Venue	Attendance
Game	Date	Opponent	Score	Record	Venue	Attendance
A	Tue, July 29	at Montreal Alouettes	L 7–40	0–1	McGill Stadium	21,347
A	July 31	at Toronto Argonauts	L 15–22	0–2	Varsity Stadium	12,584

== Regular season ==
=== Standings ===
Western Interprovincial Football Union
Team	GP	W	L	T	PF	PA	Pts
Winnipeg Blue Bombers	16	13	3	0	361	182	26
Edmonton Eskimos	16	9	6	1	312	292	19
Saskatchewan Roughriders	16	7	7	2	320	324	16
Calgary Stampeders	16	6	9	1	314	312	13
BC Lions	16	3	13	0	202	399	6

=== Schedule ===
Week	Game	Date	Opponent	Results		Venue	Attendance
Week	Game	Date	Opponent	Score	Record	Venue	Attendance
1	1	Thu, Aug 14	vs. Edmonton Eskimos	W 29–21	1–0	Winnipeg Stadium	18,166
2	2	Thu, Aug 21	at Saskatchewan Roughriders	L 13–21	1–1	Taylor Field	13,233
2	3	Mon, Aug 25	at Edmonton Eskimos	W 15–8	2–1	Clarke Stadium	17,000
3	4	Thu, Aug 28	vs. BC Lions	W 31–1	3–1	Winnipeg Stadium	16,611
3	5	Mon, Sept 1	at Calgary Stampeders	L 3–11	3–2	Mewata Stadium	17,750
4	6	Sat, Sept 6	vs. Saskatchewan Roughriders	W 27–6	4–2	Winnipeg Stadium	18,336
5	7	Sat, Sept 13	at Calgary Stampeders	W 20–7	5–2	Mewata Stadium	15,700
5	8	Mon, Sept 15	at BC Lions	W 18–9	6–2	Empire Stadium	20,000
6	9	Sat, Sept 20	vs. Calgary Stampeders	W 36–9	7–2	Winnipeg Stadium	20,059
7	10	Mon, Sept 29	vs. Edmonton Eskimos	W 43–13	8–2	Winnipeg Stadium	18,559
8	11	Sat, Oct 4	at Edmonton Eskimos	W 21–15	9–2	Clarke Stadium	20,000
8	12	Mon, Oct 6	at Saskatchewan Roughriders	W 14–13	10–2	Taylor Field	11,581
9	13	Sat, Oct 11	vs. BC Lions	L 8–10	10–3	Winnipeg Stadium	14,484
10	14	Mon, Oct 20	vs. Saskatchewan Roughriders	W 21–15	11–3	Winnipeg Stadium	16,319
11	15	Mon, Oct 27	vs. Calgary Stampeders	W 37–10	12–3	Winnipeg Stadium	15,564
13	16	Sat, Nov 1	at BC Lions	W 24–14	13–3	Winnipeg Stadium	18,918

== Playoffs ==
Round	Date	Opponent	Results		Venue	Attendance
Round	Date	Opponent	Score	Record	Venue	Attendance
West Final #1	Sat, Nov 15	at Edmonton Eskimos	W 30–7	1–0	Clarke Stadium	17,000
West Final #2	Wed, Nov 19	vs. Edmonton Eskimos	L 7–30	1–1	Winnipeg Stadium	16,880
West Final #3	Sat, Nov 22	vs. Edmonton Eskimos	W 23–7	2–1	Winnipeg Stadium	15,671
46th Grey Cup	Nov 29	Hamilton Tiger-Cats	W 35–28	3–1	Empire Stadium	36,567

=== Grey Cup ===
Team	Q1	Q2	Q3	Q4	Total
Winnipeg Blue Bombers	0	20	7	8	35
Hamilton Tiger-Cats	14	0	14	0	28
