= Tom Moore (running back) =

American football player (born 1938)

No. 25, 21
- Positions: Halfback, fullback

Personal information
- Born: July 17, 1938 (age 88); Goodlettsville, Tennessee, U.S.
- Listed height: 6 ft 2 in (1.88 m)
- Listed weight: 215 lb (98 kg)

Career information
- High school: Goodlettsville (TN)
- College: Vanderbilt
- NFL draft: 1960: 1st round, 5th overall pick
- AFL draft: 1960: 1st round

Career history
- Green Bay Packers (1960–1965); Los Angeles Rams (1966); Atlanta Falcons (1967)

Awards and highlights
- 3× NFL champion (1961, 1962, 1965); Second-team All-Pro (1963); Pro Bowl (1962); Third-team All-American (1959); 2× First-team All-SEC (1958, 1959)

Career NFL statistics
- Rushing yards: 2,445
- Rushing average: 3.7
- Receptions: 141
- Receiving yards: 1,152
- Total touchdowns: 31
- Stats at Pro Football Reference

Tom Moore (born July 17, 1938) is an American former professional football player who was a running back for eight seasons in the National Football League (NFL) for eight seasons, the first six with the Green Bay Packers. He played college football for the Vanderbilt Commodores. He went to the Pro Bowl after Green Bay's 1962 season and later played for the Los Angeles Rams and Atlanta Falcons.

== Early life ==
Born and raised in Goodlettsville, Tennessee, Moore played college football at Vanderbilt University in Nashville on both sides of the ball.

== Playing career ==
Moore was the fifth overall pick of the 1960 NFL draft, selected by the Green Bay Packers. He was a three-time NFL champion with the Packers in 1961, 1962, and 1965. Moore was selected for the 1962 Pro Bowl & all-pro selection in 1963 and wore jersey number #25 for the Packers. Starting hall of fame halfback Paul Hornung was suspended by league commissioner Pete Rozelle for the 1963 season and Moore saw increased playing time.

Moore was second-leading rusher on team in 1962 (377 yards) and 1963 (658 yards) behind Jim Taylor. He scored a career-high seven rushing touchdowns in 1962 season. Moore gained 2,069 yards on the ground and scored 20 rushing touchdowns and had 71 receptions for 605 yards and seven touchdowns. He played in 78 regular-season games for the Packers.

After six seasons in Green Bay and the addition of Donny Anderson to the roster, Moore was traded to the Los Angeles Rams in April 1966. He caught 60 passes that season, then a league record for a running back. Moore was traded to the second-year Atlanta Falcons in July 1967, after a request to be closer to his business interests. and retired after the season.

== NFL career statistics ==
Legend
	Won the NFL championship
**Bold**	Career high

=== Regular season ===
Year	Team	Games		Rushing					Receiving				
Year	Team	GP	GS	Att	Yds	Avg	Lng	TD	Rec	Yds	Avg	Lng	TD
1960	GNB	12	0	45	237	**5.3**	59	4	5	40	8.0	12	1
1961	GNB	13	2	61	302	5.0	69	1	8	41	5.1	11	1
1962	GNB	14	6	112	377	3.4	32	**7**	11	100	9.1	34	0
1963	GNB	12	12	**132**	**658**	5.0	**77**	6	23	237	10.3	**45**	2
1964	GNB	14	1	102	371	3.6	35	2	17	140	8.2	33	2
1965	GNB	13	4	51	124	2.4	13	0	7	87	**12.4**	31	1
1966	RAM	14	14	104	272	2.6	18	1	**60**	**433**	7.2	30	**3**
1967	ATL	10	8	53	104	2.0	18	0	10	74	7.4	21	0
		102	47	660	2,445	3.7	77	21	141	1,152	8.2	45	10

=== Playoffs ===
Year	Team	Games		Rushing					Receiving				
Year	Team	GP	GS	Att	Yds	Avg	Lng	TD	Rec	Yds	Avg	Lng	TD
1960	GNB	1	0	5	22	**4.4**	12	0	**2**	**9**	**4.5**	**5**	0
1961	GNB	1	0	**6**	**25**	4.2	11	0	0	0	0.0	0	0
1962	GNB	1	0	**6**	24	4.0	**14**	0	0	0	0.0	0	0
1965	GNB	2	0	5	8	1.6	2	0	1	-4	-4.0	-4	0
		5	0	22	79	3.6	14	0	3	5	1.7	5	0

== Personal life ==
Moore lives with his wife, Carol, in Hendersonville, Tennessee, northeast of Nashville. After 23 years in the real estate business, he retired in 1991.
