= 1958 BC Lions season =

Canadian football team season

- General manager: Herb Capozzi
- Head coach: Clem Crowe; Dan Edwards
- Home stadium: Empire Stadium

Results
- Record: 3–13
- Division place: 5th, W.I.F.U.
- Playoffs: did not qualify

Uniform

The 1958 BC Lions finished the season in fifth place in the W.I.F.U. with a 3–13 record.

Head coach Clem Crowe was fired after an 0–5 start to the season and his replacement, former star end Dan Edwards, didn't fare much better, losing his first five games before finally recording a win in a game versus Calgary. All-star guard and linebacker Ed Sharkey on played only five games after sustaining what would be a career-ending neck injury.

After the season, Dan Edwards was fired and Winnipeg assistant Wayne Robinson was hired on December 6 to be the fourth head coach in Lions history.

Even with such a dismal start to the season, the Lions averaged 23,647 fans per game. On a stranger note, the Lions schedule was exactly the same as that of the previous season.

Rookie offensive lineman Tom Hinton was the lone Western all-star for the Lions.

== Regular season ==
=== Season standings ===
Western Interprovincial Football Union
Team	GP	W	L	T	PF	PA	Pts
Winnipeg Blue Bombers	16	13	3	0	361	182	26
Edmonton Eskimos	16	9	6	1	312	292	19
Saskatchewan Roughriders	16	7	7	2	320	324	16
Calgary Stampeders	16	6	9	1	314	312	13
BC Lions	16	3	13	0	202	399	6

=== Season schedule ===
Game	Date	Opponent	Results	
Game	Date	Opponent	Score	Record
1	Aug 16	vs. Saskatchewan Roughriders	L 33–49	0–1
2	Aug 18	at Calgary Stampeders	L 0–42	0–2
3	Aug 25	vs. Calgary Stampeders	L 13–34	0–3
4	Aug 28	at Winnipeg Blue Bombers	L 1–31	0–4
5	Sept 1	at Saskatchewan Roughriders	L 14–22	0–5
6	Sept 6	vs. Edmonton Eskimos	L 7–26	0–6
7	Sept 13	at Edmonton Eskimos	L 7–13	0–7
8	Sept 15	vs. Winnipeg Blue Bombers	L 8–19	0–8
9	Sept 27	at Calgary Stampeders	L 15–29	0–9
10	Sept 29	vs. Saskatchewan Roughriders	L 6–22	0–10
11	Oct 6	vs. Calgary Stampeders	W 15–14	1–10
12	Oct 11	at Winnipeg Blue Bombers	W 10–8	2–10
13	Oct 13	at Saskatchewan Roughriders	W 34–16	3–10
14	Oct 18	vs. Edmonton Eskimos	L 22–25	3–11
15	Oct 25	at Edmonton Eskimos	L 3–25	3–12
16	Nov 1	vs. Winnipeg Blue Bombers	L 14–24	3–13

=== Offensive leaders ===
Player	Passing yds	Rushing yds	Receiving yds	TD
George Herring	1669	-111	0	0
Al Dorow	1212	44	0	2
By Bailey		489	131	4
Ed Vereb	12	424	174	5
Paul Cameron	31	304	834	3
Jerry Janes		0	828	5

== 1958 CFL awards ==
None
