= 1960 Green Bay Packers season =

NFL team season

- General manager: Vince Lombardi
- Head coach: Vince Lombardi
- Home stadium: City Stadium; Milwaukee County Stadium

Results
- Record: 8–4
- Division place: 1st NFL Western
- Playoffs: Lost NFL Championship (at Eagles) 13–17

The 1960 Green Bay Packers season was their 42nd season overall and their 40th season in the National Football League. The team finished with an 8–4 record under second-year head coach Vince Lombardi to win the Western Conference and a berth in the NFL championship game. It was the Packers' first appearance in the title game since winning it in 1944. After a Thanksgiving Day loss at Detroit, the Packers won their final three games, all on the road, to win the crown.

The championship game was against the Eastern Conference champion Philadelphia Eagles (10–2), played at Franklin Field in Philadelphia on Monday, December 26. Two years earlier in 1958, both teams had been last in their respective conferences, winning a combined three games.

In a close game, the Packers led in the fourth quarter, but lost 17–13. Green Bay returned to the title game the next two seasons and won both.

== Offseason ==
=== NFL draft ===
1960 Green Bay Packers draft
Round	Pick	Player	Position	College	Notes
1	5	Tom Moore *	Running back	Vanderbilt	
2	17	Bob Jeter *	Cornerback	Iowa	
5	51	Dale Hackbart	Safety	Wisconsin	
6	65	Mike Wright	Tackle	Minnesota	
7	77	Kirk Phares	Guard	South Carolina	
8	89	Don Hitt	Center	Oklahoma State	
9	101	Frank Brixius	Tackle	Minnesota	
11	125	Ron Ray	Defensive tackle	Howard Payne	
12	137	Harry Ball	Tackle	Boston College	
13	149	Paul Winslow	Defensive back	North Carolina Central	
14	161	Jon Gilliam	Center	East Texas State	
15	173	Garney Henley	Defensive back	Huron	
16	185	John Littlejohn	Defensive back	Kansas State	
17	197	Joe Gomes	Defensive back	South Carolina	
18	209	Royce Whittington	Tackle	Southwestern Louisiana	
19	221	Rich Brooks	End	Purdue	
20	233	Gilmer Lewis	Tackle	Oklahoma	
Made roster * Made at least one Pro Bowl during career

=== Undrafted free agents ===
1960 undrafted free agents of note
Player	Position	College
Leo Bland	Center	Furman
Ken Iman	Center	Southeast Missouri State
Dick Pesonen	Cornerback	Minnesota Duluth
Jim Polen	Tackle	Western Reserve
Dick Posewitz	Running back	Montana State
Willie Wood	Safety	USC

== Roster ==
Green Bay Packers roster
Quarterbacks: 17 Lamar McHan; 15 Bart Starr; Running backs: 37 Larry Hickman; 5 Paul Hornung K; 25 Tom Moore; 31 Jim Taylor; Wide receivers: 33 Lew Carpenter; 86 Boyd Dowler P; 85 Max McGee P; Tight ends: 84 Gary Knafelc; 88 Ron Kramer; 80 Steve Meilinger	Offensive linemen: 62 Andy Cvercko G; 75 Forrest Gregg T; 53 Ken Iman C; 64 Jerry Kramer G; 78 Norm Masters T; 51 Jim Ringo C; 76 Bob Skoronski T; 63 Fuzzy Thurston G; Defensive linemen: 73 Ken Beck DT/DE; 87 Willie Davis DE; 79 Dave Hanner DT; 74 Henry Jordan DT; 72 John Miller DT; 83 Bill Quinlan DE; 82 Jim Temp DE	Linebackers: 65 Tom Bettis MLB; 58 Dan Currie OLB; 71 Bill Forester OLB; 66 Ray Nitschke MLB; Defensive backs: 46 Hank Gremminger CB; 40 Dale Hackbart CB/S; 48 Dick Pesonen CB/S; 27 John Symank FS; 45 Emlen Tunnell SS; 47 Jesse Whittenton CB; 24 Willie Wood FS	Reserve: 20 Joe Francis QB (IR); Rookies in italics

== Regular season ==
=== Schedule ===
Week	Date	Opponent	Result	Record	Venue	Attendance
1	September 25	Chicago Bears	**L** 14–17	0–1	City Stadium	32,150
2	October 2	Detroit Lions	**W** 28–9	1–1	City Stadium	32,150
3	October 9	Baltimore Colts	**W** 35–21	2–1	City Stadium	32,150
4	Bye					
5	October 23	San Francisco 49ers	**W** 41–14	3–1	Milwaukee County Stadium	39,914
6	October 30	at Pittsburgh Steelers	**W** 19–13	4–1	Forbes Field	30,155
7	November 6	Baltimore Colts	**L** 24–38	4–2	Memorial Stadium	57,808
8	November 13	Dallas Cowboys	**W** 41–7	5–2	City Stadium	32,294
9	November 20	Los Angeles Rams	**L** 31–33	5–3	Milwaukee County Stadium	35,763
10	November 24	at Detroit Lions	**L** 10–23	5–4	Tiger Stadium	51,123
11	December 4	at Chicago Bears	**W** 41–13	6–4	Wrigley Field	46,406
12	December 10	at San Francisco 49ers	**W** 13–0	7–4	Kezar Stadium	53,612
13	December 17	at Los Angeles Rams	**W** 35–21	8–4	Los Angeles Memorial Coliseum	53,445
Note: Intra-conference opponents are in **bold** text.

=== Game summaries ===
==== Week 1 vs Bears ====
Week One: Chicago Bears (0–0) at Green Bay Packers (0–0)

Quarter	1	2	3	4	Total
**Bears**	0	0	0	17	**17**
Packers	0	7	7	0	**14**

at New City Stadium, Green Bay, Wisconsin

- Date: September 25
- Game weather: 60 °F (16 °C)
- Game attendance: 32,150
- Box Score

Game information

**First quarter**

- No scoring

**Second quarter**

- GB – Jim Taylor 1-yard run (Paul Hornung kick). Packers 7–0. Drive:

**Third quarter**

- GB – Paul Hornung 2-yard run (Paul Hornung kick). Packers 14–0. Drive:

**Fourth quarter**

- CHI – Willie Galimore 18-yard run (John Aveni kick). Packers 14–7. Drive:
- CHI – Rick Casares 26-yard run (John Aveni kick). Tie 14–14. Drive:
- CHI – John Aveni 16-yard field goal. Bears 17–14. Drive:

Top passers

- CHI – Zeke Bratkowski – 13/24, 178 yards, 2 INT
- GB – Bart Starr – 8/22, 68 yards, 2 INT

Top rushers

- CHI – Rick Casares – 20 rushes, 79 yards, TD
- GB – Jim Taylor – 16 rushes, 83 yards, TD

Top receivers

- CHI – Willard Dewveall – 6 receptions, 97 yards
- GB – Boyd Dowler – 4 receptions, 45 yards

==== Week 2 ====
Team	1	2	3	4	Total
Lions	3	6	0	0	9
• Packers	0	7	7	14	28

- Date: October 2
- Location: City Stadium, Green Bay, Wisconsin
- Game attendance: 32,150
- Game weather: 53 °F (12 °C); wind 16 mph

Scoring summary
Q1	DET	Jim Martin 14-yard field goal	DET 3–0
Q2	DET	Jim Martin 20-yard field goal	DET 6–0
Q2	GB	Tom Moore 5-yard run (Paul Hornung kick)	GB 7–6
Q2	DET	Jim Martin 48-yard field goal	DET 9–7
Q3	GB	Jim Taylor 2-yard run (Paul Hornung kick)	GB 14–9
Q4	GB	Paul Hornung 16-yard pass from Lamar McHan (Paul Hornung kick)	GB 21–9
Q4	GB	Paul Hornung 11-yard run (Paul Hornung kick)	GB 28–9

==== Week 3 ====
Team	1	2	3	4	Total
Colts	0	7	0	14	21
• Packers	0	7	7	21	35

- Date: October 2
- Location: City Stadium
- Game attendance: 32,150
- Game weather: 49 °F (9 °C); wind 6 mph

Scoring summary
Q2	GB	Taylor 12-yard run (Hornung kick)	GB 7–0
Q2	BAL	Ameche 12-yard run (Myhra kick)	Tie 7–7
Q3	GB	Taylor 3-yard run (Hornung kick)	GB 14–7
Q4	GB	Taylor 1-yard run (Hornung kick)	GB 21–7
Q4	BAL	Hawkins 1-yard run (Myhra kick)	GB 21–14
Q4	GB	Moore 12-yard pass from McHan (Hornung kick)	GB 28–14
Q4	BAL	Hawkins 1-yard pass from Unitas (Myhra kick)	GB 28–21
Q4	GB	McHan 35-yard run (Hornung kick)	GB 35–21

=== Playoffs ===
Round	Date	Opponent	Result	Record	Venue	Attendance
Championship	December 26	at Philadelphia Eagles	**L** 13–17	0–1	Franklin Field	67,325

== Standings ==
NFL Western Conference
	W	L	T	PCT	CONF	PF	PA	STK
Green Bay Packers	8	4	0	.667	7–4	332	209	W3
Detroit Lions	7	5	0	.583	7–4	239	212	W4
San Francisco 49ers	7	5	0	.583	7–4	208	205	W1
Baltimore Colts	6	6	0	.500	5–6	288	234	L4
Chicago Bears	5	6	1	.455	5–5–1	194	299	L3
Los Angeles Rams	4	7	1	.364	4–6–1	265	297	L1
Dallas Cowboys	0	11	1	.000	0–6	177	369	L1

Note: Tie games were not officially counted in the standings until 1972.

== Postseason ==
=== NFL Championship Game ===
	1	2	3	4	Total
Packers	3	3	0	7	13
Eagles	0	10	0	7	17

- First quarter
  - GB – Paul Hornung 20-yard FG
- Second quarter
  - GB – Hornung 23-yard FG
  - Phi – Tommy McDonald 35-yard pass from Norm Van Brocklin (Bobby Walston kick)
  - Phi – Walston 15-yard FG
- Third quarter
  - No scoring
- Fourth quarter
  - GB – Max McGee 7-yard pass from Bart Starr (Hornung kick)
  - Phi – Ted Dean 5 run (Walston kick)

== Awards and records ==
- Tom Moore, NFL Kickoff Return Leader
- Paul Hornung set an NFL record for scoring 176 points, a record that since has been broken
