= 1960 Detroit Lions season =

NFL team season (won NFL Playoff Bowl)

- Head coach: George Wilson
- Home stadium: Briggs Stadium

Results
- Record: 7–5
- Division place: 2nd NFL Western
- Playoffs: Won NFL Playoff Bowl (vs. Browns) 17–16

The 1960 Detroit Lions season was the 27th in the Motor City, and 31st season overall in franchise history. The Lions had only one win entering November, but had only one loss in their final seven games and finished at 7–5, one game short of the Western Conference championship (won by Green Bay). However, the Lions won the inaugural third place Playoff Bowl over the Cleveland Browns at the Miami Orange Bowl.

Due to this being the NFL's last 12-game regular season and the addition of the Dallas Cowboys giving the league 13 teams - meaning each team was required to have a bye during the season - the 1960 Lions are the last NFL team that did not play its season opener until October: Detroit drew its bye during Week One, which was in the last week of September.

Oddly, in the next season in which each NFL team had a bye week (in 1966, due to addition of the Atlanta Falcons giving the league 15 teams), the Lions did not have their bye until Week 15 (the last week of that season).

== Offseason ==
=== NFL draft ===
1960 Detroit Lions draft
Round	Pick	Player	Position	College	Notes
1	3	Johnny Robinson * ^{†}	Safety	LSU	
2	15	Warren Rabb	Quarterback	LSU	
3	27	Bob Scholtz	Center	Notre Dame	
4	39	Jim Andreotti	Center	Northwestern	
4	42	Roger Brown *	Defensive tackle	Maryland State	
6	63	Gail Cogdill *	Wide receiver	Washington State	
Made roster † Pro Football Hall of Fame * Made at least one Pro Bowl during career

== Roster ==
1960 Detroit Lions roster
Quarterbacks: 14 Earl Morrall; 15 Jim Ninowski; 18 Warren Rabb; Running backs: 41 Terry Barr; 45 Dan Lewis; 33 Nick Pietrosante; 34 Ken Webb; Wide receivers: 40 Howard Cassady; 89 Gail Cogdill; 87 Glenn Davis; 84 Dave Middleton; Tight ends: 80 Jim Gibbons; 88 Steve Junker	Offensive linemen: 61 Grady Alderman G; 75 John Gordy G; 60 Bob Grottkau G; 70 Willie McClung T; 50 Bob Scholtz C; 66 Harley Sewell G; 73 Ollie Spencer T/C; Defensive linemen: 76 Roger Brown DT; 53 Bill Glass DE; 71 Alex Karras DT; 72 Gil Mains DT; 78 Darris McCord DE/T; 74 Jim Weatherall DT; 88 Sam Williams DE	Linebackers: 57 Carl Brettschneider OLB; 47 Jim Martin OLB/K; 56 Joe Schmidt MLB; 55 Wayne Walker OLB/MLB; Defensive backs: 81 Night Train Lane CB; 28 Yale Lary FS/P; 44 Dick LeBeau CB; 43 Gary Lowe SS; 21 Bruce Maher CB; 20 Jim Steffen CB; 23 Dave Whitsell SS	Reserve lists: -- Hal Boutte WR (Military); 54 Max Messner LB (IR); Note: rookies in italics

== Regular season ==
According to the team, a total of 39,153 season tickets were sold by the Lions for the 1960 campaign. The Lions played their home games in Briggs Stadium (Tiger Stadium), which had a regular listed seating capacity of 46,194, with an additional 7,000 bleacher seats for football to bring total capacity to 53,194.

=== Schedule ===
Week	Date	Opponent	Result	Record	Attendance
1	Bye				
2	October 2	at Green Bay Packers	L 9–28	0–1	32,150
3	October 9	San Francisco 49ers	L 10–14	0–2	49,825
4	October 16	at Philadelphia Eagles	L 10–28	0–3	38,065
5	October 23	Baltimore Colts	W 30–17	1–3	53,854
6	October 30	at Los Angeles Rams	L 35–48	1–4	53,295
7	November 6	at San Francisco 49ers	W 24–0	2–4	48,447
8	November 13	Los Angeles Rams	W 12–10	3–4	54,019
9	November 20	at Chicago Bears	L 7–28	3–5	46,267
10	November 24	Green Bay Packers	W 23–10	4–5	54,123
11	December 4	at Baltimore Colts	W 20–15	5–5	57,808
12	December 11	Dallas Cowboys	W 23–14	6–5	43,272
13	December 18	Chicago Bears	W 36–0	7–5	51,017

- Thursday (November 24: Thanksgiving)
- A bye week was necessary in 1960, as the league expanded to an odd-number (13) of teams (Dallas); one team was idle each week.

=== Game summaries ===
==== Week 9 ====
Team	1	2	3	4	Total
Packers	0	0	10	0	10
• Lions	9	7	7	0	23

- Date: November 24
- Location: Tiger Stadium, Detroit, Michigan
- Game attendance: 54,123
- Game weather: 36 °F (2 °C); wind 10 mph (16 km/h)

Scoring summary
Q1	DET	Safety, blocked punt through end zone	DET 2–0
Q1	DET	Jim Ninowski 7 yard run (Jim Martin kick)	DET 9–0
Q2	DET	Ken Webb 1 yard run (Jim Martin kick)	DET 16–0
Q3	GB	Paul Hornung 12 yard field goal	DET 16–3
Q3	GB	Paul Hornung 8 yard run (Paul Hornung kick)	DET 16–10
Q3	DET	Jim Gibbons 11 yard pass from Jim Ninowski (Jim Martin kick)	DET 23–10

Thanksgiving Day game

== Standings ==
NFL Western Conference
	W	L	T	PCT	CONF	PF	PA	STK
Green Bay Packers	8	4	0	.667	7–4	332	209	W3
Detroit Lions	7	5	0	.583	7–4	239	212	W4
San Francisco 49ers	7	5	0	.583	7–4	208	205	W1
Baltimore Colts	6	6	0	.500	5–6	288	234	L4
Chicago Bears	5	6	1	.455	5–5–1	194	299	L3
Los Angeles Rams	4	7	1	.364	4–6–1	265	297	L1
Dallas Cowboys	0	11	1	.000	0–6	177	369	L1

Note: Tie games were not officially counted in the standings until 1972.

== Playoff Bowl ==
The first Playoff Bowl game for third place was played at the Orange Bowl in Miami, the week following the NFL Championship game.

Round	Date	Opponent	Result	Venue	Attendance
Playoff Bowl	January 7, 1961	Cleveland Browns	W 17–16	Orange Bowl	34,981
