= 1960 Los Angeles Rams season =

NFL team season

- Owner: Dan Reeves
- Head coach: Bob Waterfield
- Home stadium: Los Angeles Memorial Coliseum

Results
- Record: 4–7–1
- Division place: 6th NFL Western
- Playoffs: Did not qualify

Uniform
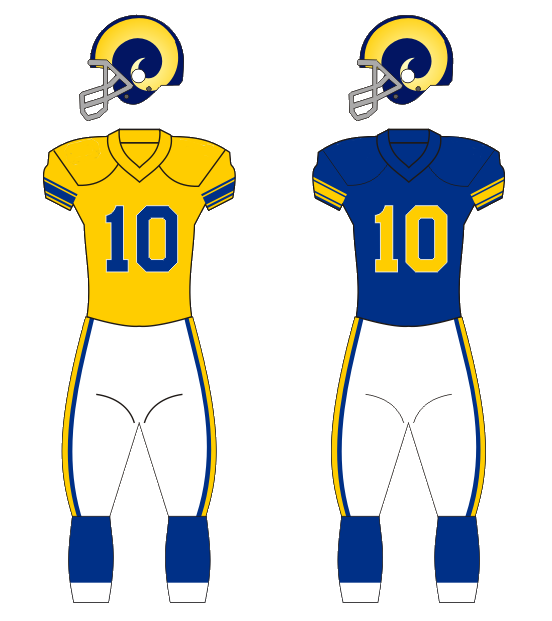

The 1960 Los Angeles Rams season was the team's 23rd year with the National Football League and the 15th season in Los Angeles. Under first-year head coach Bob Waterfield, the team won four and lost seven with one tie, placing the Rams in sixth place in the Western Conference, ahead of only the winless expansion Dallas Cowboys. Their most notable win was an upset of the Green Bay Packers at Milwaukee on November 20. Four weeks later in the season finale, the Packers returned the favor in Los Angeles to win the Western conference title. It was also the first season in which the Rams would share the same venue as the upstart Los Angeles Chargers of the American Football League (AFL) before the team would leave for San Diego in 1961. The Rams would not share the same venue with the Chargers until 2020 when both teams would move into SoFi Stadium in the suburb of Inglewood.

In the pre-season, the Rams played the Cowboys in rural northeastern Oregon, at Pendleton's rodeo grounds on Sunday, September 4.

== Offseason ==
=== NFL draft ===
1960 Los Angeles Rams draft
| Round | Pick | Player | Position | College | Notes |
| 1 | 1 | Billy Cannon * | Running back | LSU | |
| 3 | 25 | Charley Britt | Defensive back | Georgia | |
| 3 | 30 | Pervis Atkins | Running back | New Mexico State | |
| 5 | 49 | Charlie Janerette | Tackle | Penn State | |
| 6 | 62 | Jerry Stalcup | Guard | Wisconsin | |
| 6 | 66 | Don Ellersick | Defensive back | Washington State | |
| 7 | 73 | Ron Morrison | Tackle | New Mexico | |
| 8 | 86 | Carroll Dale * | Wide receiver | Virginia Tech | |
| 9 | 97 | Marv Luster | End | UCLA | |
| 10 | 110 | Curtis McClinton | Running back | Kansas | |
| 11 | 121 | Ken Young | Running back | Valparaiso | |
| 12 | 134 | Doug Pat Brown | Guard | Fresno State | |
| 13 | 145 | James Jones | End | SMU | |
| 14 | 158 | Harold Stanger | Center | North Texas State | |
| 15 | 169 | Harry Rakowski | Center | The Citadel | |
| 16 | 182 | Don Kacmarek | Tackle | North Dakota | |
| 17 | 193 | Emanuel Congedo | End | Villanova | |
| 18 | 206 | Tom Gates | Back | San Bernardino Valley | |
| 19 | 217 | Jim Boeke | Tackle | Heidelberg | |
| 20 | 230 | Royce Shelton | Halfback | Stephen F. Austin State | |
Made roster * Made at least one Pro Bowl during career

=== Undrafted free agents ===
1960 undrafted free agents of note
| Player | Position | College |
|---|---|---|
| Vern Valdez | Defensive back | San Diego |
| Danny Villanueva | Kicker | New Mexico State |

== Roster ==
1960 Los Angeles Rams roster
| Quarterbacks (QB): 10 Buddy Humphrey; 15 Frank Ryan; 9 Bill Wade; Running backs (RB): 26 Jon Arnett; 34 Joe Marconi P; 33 Ollie Matson FS; 24 Tommy Wilson; Wide receivers (WR): 22 Dick Bass; 81 Carroll Dale; 29 Del Shofner P/S; 46 Clendon Thomas S; Tight ends (TE): 82 Jim Phillips | Offensive linemen (OL): 78 Jim Boeke T; 79 Charlie Bradshaw T; 64 Roy Hord G; 56 Art Hunter C; 67 Charlie Janerette G; 63 Buck Lansford G; 55 Lou Michaels T/DT/K; Defensive linemen (DL): 74 John Baker DE/DT; 80 Gene Brito DE; 72 John Kenerson DE/DT; 76 John LoVetere DT; 85 Lamar Lundy DE; 77 George Strugar DT | Linebackers (LB): 65 John Guzik MLB; 57 Bill Jobko OLB; 84 Bob Long OLB; 32 Jack Pardee OLB; 48 Les Richter MLB; 60 Jerry Stalcup OLB; Defensive backs (DB): 17 Charley Britt SS; 44 Don Ellersick FS; 20 Carl Karilivacz CB; 21 Eddie Meador CB; 43 Will Sherman SS/FS; 47 Vern Valdez CB; Special teams (ST): 11 Danny Villanueva K | Rookies in italics |

== Schedule ==
| Week | Date | Opponent | Result | Record | Venue | Attendance |
|---|---|---|---|---|---|---|
| 1 | September 23 | St. Louis Cardinals | **L** 21–43 | 0–1 | Los Angeles Memorial Coliseum | 47,448 |
| 2 | October 2 | at **San Francisco 49ers** | **L** 9–13 | 0–2 | Kezar Stadium | 53,633 |
| 3 | October 9 | at **Chicago Bears** | **L** 27–34 | 0–3 | Wrigley Field | 47,776 |
| 4 | October 16 | at **Baltimore Colts** | **L** 17–31 | 0–4 | Memorial Stadium | 57,808 |
| 5 | October 23 | **Chicago Bears** | **T** 24–24 | 0–4–1 | Los Angeles Memorial Coliseum | 63,438 |
| 6 | October 30 | **Detroit Lions** | **W** 48–35 | 1–4–1 | Los Angeles Memorial Coliseum | 53,295 |
| 7 | November 6 | at **Dallas Cowboys** | **W** 38–13 | 2–4–1 | Cotton Bowl | 16,000 |
| 8 | November 13 | at **Detroit Lions** | **L** 10–12 | 2–5–1 | Briggs Stadium | 54,019 |
| 9 | November 20 | at **Green Bay Packers** | **W** 33–31 | 3–5–1 | Milwaukee County Stadium | 35,763 |
| 10 | Bye | | | | | |
| 11 | December 4 | **San Francisco 49ers** | **L** 7–23 | 3–6–1 | Los Angeles Memorial Coliseum | 77,254 |
| 12 | December 11 | **Baltimore Colts** | **W** 10–3 | 4–6–1 | Los Angeles Memorial Coliseum | 75,461 |
| 13 | December 17 | **Green Bay Packers** | **L** 21–35 | 4–7–1 | Los Angeles Memorial Coliseum | 53,445 |
Note: Intra-conference opponents are in **bold** text.

- A bye week was necessary in 1960, as the league expanded to an odd number (13) of teams (Dallas); one team was idle each week.

== Standings ==
NFL Western Conference
| | W | L | T | PCT | CONF | PF | PA | STK |
|---|---|---|---|---|---|---|---|---|
| Green Bay Packers | 8 | 4 | 0 | .667 | 7–4 | 332 | 209 | W3 |
| Detroit Lions | 7 | 5 | 0 | .583 | 7–4 | 239 | 212 | W4 |
| San Francisco 49ers | 7 | 5 | 0 | .583 | 7–4 | 208 | 205 | W1 |
| Baltimore Colts | 6 | 6 | 0 | .500 | 5–6 | 288 | 234 | L4 |
| Chicago Bears | 5 | 6 | 1 | .455 | 5–5–1 | 194 | 299 | L3 |
| Los Angeles Rams | 4 | 7 | 1 | .364 | 4–6–1 | 265 | 297 | L1 |
| Dallas Cowboys | 0 | 11 | 1 | .000 | 0–6 | 177 | 369 | L1 |

Note: Tie games were not officially counted in the standings until 1972.
