= 1960 Baltimore Colts season =

8th season in franchise history

- Owner: Carroll Rosenbloom
- General manager: Don "Red" Kellett
- Head coach: Weeb Ewbank
- Home stadium: Memorial Stadium

Results
- Record: 6–6
- Division place: 4th NFL Western
- Playoffs: Did not qualify

The 1960 Baltimore Colts season was the eighth for the team in the National Football League. The season started well for the Colts going 6–2. The team looked like they would win their third straight championship. Then in a game on Dec. 4th against the Detroit Lions, star running back Alan Ameche tore his Achilles tendon and missed the final two games. The injury ended his career. With Ameche out, the Colts ended the season losing their last three games, for a total of four consecutive losses. Their record was 6 wins and 6 losses. The team went from first to fourth place in the Western Conference. As a result, their two-year reign as NFL champions came to an end.

== Offseason ==
=== NFL draft ===
1960 Baltimore Colts draft
Round	Pick	Player	Position	College	Notes
1	12	Ron Mix * ^{†}	Tackle	USC	
2	23	Don Floyd	Defensive end	TCU	
2	24	Marvin Terrell	Guard	Ole Miss	
3	34	Jim Welch	Safety	SMU	
4	47	Gerhard Schwedes	Halfback	Syracuse	
5	58	Marv Lasater	Back	TCU	
Made roster † Pro Football Hall of Fame * Made at least one Pro Bowl during career

== Roster ==
1960 Baltimore Colts roster
Quarterbacks (QB): 17 Ray Brown P/SS; 19 Johnny Unitas; Running backs (RB): 35 Alan Ameche; 25 Alex Hawkins; 43 Ed Kovac; 31 Billy Pricer; 26 Mike Sommer; 46 Jim Welch; Wide receivers (WR): 82 Raymond Berry; 24 Lenny Moore; 87 Jerry Richardson; Tight ends (TE): 21 Art DeCarlo; 84 Jim Mutscheller	Offensive linemen (OL): 50 Buzz Nutter C; 77 Jim Parker T; 79 Sherman Plunkett T; 60 George Preas T; 62 Palmer Pyle G; 68 Alex Sandusky G; 73 Lebron Shields T/G; 63 Art Spinney G; Defensive linemen (DL): 81 Ordell Braase DE; 75 Jim Colvin DT/DE; 70 Art Donovan DT; 83 Don Joyce DE/DT; 76 Gene Lipscomb DT; 89 Gino Marchetti DE	Linebackers (LB): 64 Marv Matuszak OLB/MLB; 36 Bill Pellington OLB; 66 Don Shinnick OLB; 61 Zeke Smith MLB/G; 52 Dick Szymanski MLB; Defensive backs (DB): 40 Bobby Boyd CB; 20 Milt Davis CB; 80 Andy Nelson SS; 44 Johnny Sample FS; 41 Jackie Simpson FS; 23 Carl Taseff CB; Special teams (ST): 65 Steve Myhra K/G	Reserve: 55 Jackie Burkett LB (IR); Rookies in italics

== Regular season ==
=== Schedule ===
Week	Date	Opponent	Result	Record	Venue	Attendance
1	September 25	Washington Redskins	**W** 20–0	1–0	Memorial Stadium	53,818
2	October 2	**Chicago Bears**	**W** 42–7	2–0	Memorial Stadium	57,808
3	October 9	at **Green Bay Packers**	**L** 21–35	2–1	New City Stadium	32,150
4	October 16	**Los Angeles Rams**	**W** 31–17	3–1	Memorial Stadium	57,808
5	October 23	at **Detroit Lions**	**L** 17–30	3–2	Briggs Stadium	53,854
6	October 30	at **Dallas Cowboys**	**W** 45–7	4–2	Cotton Bowl	25,500
7	November 6	**Green Bay Packers**	**W** 38–24	5–2	Memorial Stadium	57,808
8	November 13	at **Chicago Bears**	**W** 24–20	6–2	Wrigley Field	48,713
9	Bye					
10	November 27	**San Francisco 49ers**	**L** 22–30	6–3	Memorial Stadium	57,808
11	December 4	**Detroit Lions**	**L** 15–20	6–4	Memorial Stadium	57,808
12	December 11	at **Los Angeles Rams**	**L** 3–10	6–5	Los Angeles Memorial Coliseum	75,461
13	December 18	at **San Francisco 49ers**	**L** 10–34	6–6	Kezar Stadium	57,269
Note: Intra-conference opponents are in **bold** text.

- A bye week was necessary in 1960, as the league expanded to an odd number (13) of teams (Dallas); one team was idle each week.

=== Game summaries ===
==== Week 1 ====
Johnny Unitas extends his record TD-a-game string to 38 with a scoring pass to Raymond Berry. Lenny Moore rammed 4 yards for a touchdown, and Steve Myhra kicked 28 and 18-yard field goals as the Colts began their challenge (unsuccessfully at the end) for a 3rd straight World Championship.

Team	1	2	3	4	Total
Redskins	0	0	0	0	0
• Colts	0	7	10	3	20

- Date: September 25
- Location: Memorial Stadium, Baltimore
- Game attendance: 53,818
- Game weather: 62 °F (17 °C); wind 9 mph (14 km/h)

Scoring summary
Q2	BAL	Moore 4 yard run (Myhra kick)	BAL 7–0
Q3	BAL	Myhra 28 yard field goal	BAL 10–0
Q3	BAL	Berry 12 yard pass from Unitas (Myhra kick)	BAL 17–0
Q4	BAL	Myhra 18 yard field goal	BAL 20–0

== Standings ==
NFL Western Conference
	W	L	T	PCT	CONF	PF	PA	STK
Green Bay Packers	8	4	0	.667	7–4	332	209	W3
Detroit Lions	7	5	0	.583	7–4	239	212	W4
San Francisco 49ers	7	5	0	.583	7–4	208	205	W1
Baltimore Colts	6	6	0	.500	5–6	288	234	L4
Chicago Bears	5	6	1	.455	5–5–1	194	299	L3
Los Angeles Rams	4	7	1	.364	4–6–1	265	297	L1
Dallas Cowboys	0	11	1	.000	0–6	177	369	L1

Note: Tie games were not officially counted in the standings until 1972.
