= 1960 St. Louis Cardinals (NFL) season =

American football team season

1960 St. Louis Cardinals season
- Owner: Violet Bidwill Wolfner
- Head coach: Pop Ivy
- Home stadium: Busch Stadium

Results
- Record: 6–5–1
- Division place: 4th NFL Eastern
- Playoffs: Did not qualify

The 1960 St. Louis Cardinals season was the team's 41st year with the National Football League (NFL) and the first in St. Louis. The oldest remaining franchise in the NFL, the Cardinals had played the previous 40 seasons in Chicago, losing a torrent of games in front of a declining audience.

The Cardinals went 6–5–1 during the first season in their new city, while playing their home schedule at Busch Stadium. It was their first winning season since 1956 when they were based in Chicago. This was also the first season to feature the famous Cardinal head logo on the helmets.

== Offseason ==
=== NFL draft ===
1960 St. Louis Cardinals draft
Round	Pick	Player	Position	College	Notes
1	2	George Izo	Quarterback	Notre Dame	
2	13	Harold Olson	Tackle	Clemson	
2	14	Mike McGee	Guard	Duke	
3	26	Hugh McInnis	Tight end	Southern Miss	
3	29	Charley Ellzey	Center	Southern Miss	
4	37	Willie West	Cornerback	Oregon	
4	38	Silas Woods	End	Marquette	
5	50	Bill Burrell	Linebacker	Illinois	
5	54	George Phelps	Back	Cornell College (IA)	
6	61	Jacky Lee	Quarterback	Cincinnati	
7	74	Larry Wilson * ^{†}	Safety	Utah	
8	85	Wayne Crow	Running back	California	
9	98	Dewitt Hoopes	Tackle	Northwestern	
10	109	Charley Johnson *	Quarterback	New Mexico State	
10	113	Paul Oglesby	Tackle	UCLA	
11	122	Bobby Towns	Cornerback	Georgia	
Made roster † Pro Football Hall of Fame * Made at least one Pro Bowl during career

== Roster ==
1960 St. Louis Cardinals roster
Quarterbacks (QB): 16 King Hill P; 12 John Roach; Running backs (RB): 44 John David Crow; 31 Mal Hammack; 36 Frank Mestnik; 49 Willie West; Wide receivers (WR): 35 Joe Childress; 40 Bobby Joe Conrad K; 88 Sonny Randle; Tight ends (TE): 86 Hugh McInnis; 85 Perry Richards	Offensive linemen (OL): 75 Ed Cook T; 61 Tom Day G; 55 Charley Ellzey C/OLB; 50 Don Gillis C; 64 Ken Gray G; 68 Mike McGee G; 78 Dale Memmelaar T; 74 Ken Panfil T; 65 Mike Rabold G; Defensive linemen (DL): 73 Ed Culpepper DT; 72 Frank Fuller DT; 70 Don Owens DT; 78 Luke Owens DE; 79 Gerry Perry K/DE; 65 Tom Redmond DT; 84 Leo Sugar DE	Linebackers (LB): 51 Ted Bates MLB; 34 Bill Koman OLB; 80 John Tracey OLB; 62 Dale Meinert MLB; Defensive backs (DB): 45 Joe Driskill CB; 33 Fred Glick CB/S; 41 Jimmy Hill CB; 25 Jerry Norton SS/P; 24 Billy Stacy CB; 7 Bobby Towns CB/S; 8 Larry Wilson FS; Special teams (ST)	Reserve: 3 George Izo QB (IR); -- Marion Rushing LB (Military); Rookies in italics

== Regular season ==
=== Schedule ===
Week	Date	Opponent	Result	Record	Venue	Attendance
1	September 23	at Los Angeles Rams	**W** 43–21	1–0	Los Angeles Memorial Coliseum	47,448
2	October 2	**New York Giants**	**L** 14–35	1–1	Busch Stadium	26,089
3	October 9	at **Philadelphia Eagles**	**L** 27–31	1–2	Franklin Field	33,701
4	October 16	at **Pittsburgh Steelers**	**L** 14–27	1–3	Forbes Field	22,971
5	October 23	Dallas Cowboys	**W** 12–10	2–3	Busch Stadium	23,128
6	October 30	at **New York Giants**	**W** 20–13	3–3	Yankee Stadium	58,516
7	November 6	**Washington Redskins**	**W** 44–7	4–3	Busch Stadium	22,458
8	November 13	at **Cleveland Browns**	**L** 27–28	4–4	Cleveland Municipal Stadium	49,192
9	November 20	at **Washington Redskins**	**W** 26–14	5–4	Griffith Stadium	23,848
10	November 27	**Cleveland Browns**	**T** 17–17	5–4–1	Busch Stadium	26,146
11	December 4	**Philadelphia Eagles**	**L** 6–20	5–5–1	Busch Stadium	21,358
12	Bye					
13	December 18	**Pittsburgh Steelers**	**W** 38–7	6–5–1	Busch Stadium	20,840
Note: Intra-conference opponents are in **bold** text.

- A bye week was necessary in 1960, as the league had an odd-number (13) of teams; one team was idle each week.
  The fourteenth team (Minnesota) joined the league in 1961 and the NFL initiated a 14-game regular season.

=== Standings ===
NFL Eastern Conference
	W	L	T	PCT	CONF	PF	PA	STK
Philadelphia Eagles	10	2	0	.833	8–2	321	246	W1
Cleveland Browns	8	3	1	.727	6–3–1	362	217	W3
New York Giants	6	4	2	.600	5–4–1	271	261	L1
St. Louis Cardinals	6	5	1	.545	4–5–1	288	230	W1
Pittsburgh Steelers	5	6	1	.455	4–5–1	240	275	L1
Washington Redskins	1	9	2	.100	0–8–2	178	309	L8

Note: Tie games were not officially counted in the standings until 1972.

== Personnel ==
=== Staff / Coaches ===
1960 St. Louis Cardinals staff
Front office: Principal Owner - Violet Bidwill Wolfner; Managing Director - Walter Wolfner; Head coaches: Head Coach – Pop Ivy; Assistant Head Coach - Chuck Drulis; Assistant Head Coach - Ray Prochaska; Assistant Head Coach - Ray Willsey; Offensive coaches: Offensive Line – Ray Prochaska	Defensive coaches: Defensive Coordinator - Chuck Drulis; Defensive Backfield Coach - Ray Willsey

== Awards and records ==
- Led NFL, fewest rushing yards allowed, 1,212 yards
- Jerry Norton, NFL leader, punting
- Jerry Norton, tied NFL record, most interceptions in one game, 4

=== Milestones ===
- John David Crow, 200 yard rushing game, 203 yards, achieved on December 18
