= 1958 Toronto Argonauts season =

CFL team season

- Head coach: Hamp Pool
- Home stadium: Varsity Stadium

Results
- Record: 4–10
- Division place: 4th, IRFU
- Playoffs: did not qualify

The 1958 Toronto Argonauts finished in fourth place in the Interprovincial Rugby Football Union with a 4–10 record and failed to make the playoffs.

== Regular season ==
=== Standings ===
Interprovincial Rugby Football Union
| Team | GP | W | L | T | PF | PA | Pts |
|---|---|---|---|---|---|---|---|
| Hamilton Tiger-Cats | 14 | 10 | 3 | 1 | 291 | 235 | 21 |
| Montreal Alouettes | 14 | 7 | 6 | 1 | 265 | 269 | 15 |
| Ottawa Rough Riders | 14 | 6 | 8 | 0 | 233 | 243 | 12 |
| Toronto Argonauts | 14 | 4 | 10 | 0 | 266 | 308 | 8 |

=== Schedule ===
| Week | Game | Date | Opponent | Results | | Venue | Attendance |
| Week | Game | Date | Opponent | Score | Record | Venue | Attendance |
|---|---|---|---|---|---|---|---|
| 1 | 1 | Tue, Aug 19 | at Ottawa Rough Riders | L 7–44 | 0–1 | Landsdowne Park | 18,470 |
| 1 | 2 | Fri, Aug 22 | vs. Montreal Alouettes | W 15–14 | 1–1 | Varsity Stadium | 19,492 |
| 2 | 3 | Mon, Sept 1 | at Hamilton Tiger-Cats | L 24–31 | 1–2 | Civic Stadium | 20,946 |
| 3 | 4 | Fri, Sept 5 | vs. Hamilton Tiger-Cats | L 17–26 | 1–3 | Varsity Stadium | 26,781 |
| 4 | 5 | Sat, Sept 13 | at Montreal Alouettes | L 21–24 | 1–4 | Molson Stadium | 22,620 |
| 5 | 6 | Sat, Sept 20 | vs. Ottawa Rough Riders | L 14–17 | 1–5 | Varsity Stadium | 20,166 |
| 6 | 7 | Sat, Sept 27 | at Ottawa Rough Riders | L 4–28 | 1–6 | Landsdowne Park | 18,500 |
| 7 | 8 | Sat, Oct 4 | vs. Montreal Alouettes | L 10–14 | 1–7 | Varsity Stadium | 16,424 |
| 8 | 9 | Sat, Oct 11 | at Hamilton Tiger-Cats | L 15–28 | 1–8 | Civic Stadium | 16,583 |
| 8 | 10 | Mon, Oct 13 | vs. Hamilton Tiger-Cats | W 37–0 | 2–8 | Varsity Stadium | 16,583 |
| 9 | 11 | Sat, Oct 18 | at Ottawa Rough Riders | W 41–0 | 3–8 | Landsdowne Park | 14,313 |
| 10 | 12 | Sat, Oct 25 | vs. Ottawa Rough Riders | W 42–24 | 4–8 | Varsity Stadium | 23,334 |
| 11 | 13 | Sat, Nov 1 | vs. Montreal Alouettes | L 7–44 | 4–9 | Varsity Stadium | 26,813 |
| 12 | 14 | Sat, Nov 8 | at Montreal Alouettes | L 12–14 | 4–10 | Molson Stadium | 22,482 |
