= Playoff Bowl =

Defunct NFL sports playoff game

Coordinates: 25.778°N 80.220°W

- Stadium: Orange Bowl
- Location: Miami, Florida
- First played: 1961 (January 7)
- Last played: 1970 (January 3)

Location in the United States

The Playoff Bowl (officially known as the Bert Bell Benefit Bowl) was a post-season game for third place in the National Football League (NFL), played ten times following the 1960 through 1969 seasons, all at the Orange Bowl in Miami, Florida. It was originally known as the Runner-Up Bowl.

The official title of Bert Bell Benefit Bowl came from the former NFL commissioner, Bert Bell. Bell, who co-founded the Eagles and co-owned the Steelers, was commissioner of the NFL from 1946 until his death during an NFL game in October 1959. The game raised money for the players' pension fund, and reportedly raised a million dollars over the decade of the 1960s.

== Location ==
All ten games in the Playoff Bowl series were contested at the Orange Bowl in Miami. The games were played in January, the week following the NFL championship game (and the collegiate Orange Bowl game on New Year's Day), except for the final year, when it was played the day before the NFL title game. The NFL's Pro Bowl (all-star game) was played the week after the Playoff Bowl.

== History ==
After the 1959 season, NFL owners faced competition from the newly-formed American Football League and wanted a vehicle through which to showcase more of its supposedly superior NFL professional football product on television, then carried through the CBS Television Network. At the time, unlike the AFL, which had a contract with the ABC Television Network for their nationally televised games, often double-headers, few NFL games were televised nationally during the season and there was only one scheduled post-season game, the NFL Championship Game. The Playoff Bowl was devised to match the second-place teams from the NFL's two conferences (Eastern and Western). This doubled from two to four the number of top NFL teams appearing in post-season play on national television.

The 1966 season required another game following the American Football League Championship Game and the NFL Championship Game, the first of four AFL–NFL World Championship Games between the champions of the two major Professional Football leagues for the undisputed championship. The establishment of the AFL–NFL World Championship Game (the Super Bowl name was not made official until Super Bowl III) was the first phase of the AFL–NFL merger of June 1966. This new mega-game between the rival leagues was played in mid-January at a warm weather location, two weeks after the championship games for each league. The NFL's Playoff Bowl was played during the idle week, and because of AFL's equally major league status, interest in the game was waning. In addition, the arrival of the Miami Dolphins in 1966 as an expansion franchise in the AFL reduced local interest in the game.

In the 1967 season, the NFL expanded to 16 teams and four scheduled post-season contests. The NFL sub-divided its two conferences (now eight teams each) into two divisions of four teams each: The Capitol and Century divisions in the Eastern conference, and the Central and Coastal divisions in the Western conference. The four division winners advanced to the post-season, competing for their conference titles in the first round of the NFL playoffs. The winners (conference champions) advanced to the NFL championship game, the losers (conference runners-up) appeared in the Playoff Bowl to vie for third place. For the three seasons (1967–69) preceding the 1970 merger with the AFL, the loser of the NFL's third place game ended up with a peculiar record of 0-2 for that post-season. In its final season in 1969, the AFL also expanded to a four-team post-season, adding two more playoff games.

The highest attendance was over 65,500 in January 1966 for the Baltimore Colts' rout of the Dallas Cowboys; the 1965 season was the last one prior to the Dolphins starting play, the AFL–NFL merger agreement, and the creation of the Super Bowl. In January 1968 and 1969, the Super Bowl was played in the Orange Bowl the following week, which further contributed to the declining attendance for the NFL's consolation game.

=== The end of the Playoff Bowl ===
When the merger was completed for the 1970 season, there was discussion about continuing the Playoff Bowl, with the losers of the AFC and NFC Championship Games playing each other during the idle week before the Super Bowl. There were now seven post-season games in the NFL (three for each conference, plus the Super Bowl), and the Pro Bowl all-star game. A "losers' game" was not necessarily attractive for the league, and the Playoff Bowl came to an end.

=== Official status ===
The ten Playoff Bowls were official third place playoff games at the time they were played; today, the NFL consider the games as exhibitions.

=== Criticism ===
Green Bay Packers coach Vince Lombardi detested the Playoff Bowl, coaching in the games following the 1963 and 1964 seasons, after winning NFL titles in 1961 and 1962. To his players, he called it "the 'Shit Bowl', ...a losers' bowl for losers." This lack of motivation may explain his Packers' rare postseason defeat in the 1964 game (January 1965) to the St. Louis Cardinals. After that loss, he fumed about "a hinky-dink football game, held in a hinky-dink town, played by hinky-dink players. That's all second place is – hinky dink."

Using the Playoff Bowl (and loss) as motivation in 1965, the Packers won the first of three consecutive NFL championships from 1965 to 1967. The Packers remain the sole NFL team to win three consecutive titles in the post-season era, which began in 1933. During this successful run, the Packers also won the first two Super Bowls in convincing fashion. Lombardi's final game (and victory) as head coach of the Packers was Super Bowl II, played in the Orange Bowl in January 1968.

All-Pro defensive tackle Roger Brown appeared in five Playoff Bowls, the most by any player, and was on the winning side each time (Detroit Lions in 1960, 1961, 1962; Los Angeles Rams in 1967, 1969). He said playing in those seemingly meaningless contests was like having "the worst inferiority complex." He added, "I was in five of them, and to have played in it five in the ten years it was in existence is pitiful."

The Lions also hold the dubious distinction of having the most victories in the Playoff Bowl, three, along with tying for the best winning percentage, 1.000.

== Players' shares ==
In its second year, the players on the winning team received $600 each (equivalent to $6,464 in 2025), the losers $400 (equivalent to $4,310 in 2025); and the fifth year game paid $800 (equivalent to $8,173 in 2025) and $600 (equivalent to $6,130 in 2025). In its final years, the winners received $1,200 each (equivalent to $9,949 in 2025), and the losers $500 (equivalent to $4,145 in 2025).

== Legacy ==
The Playoff Bowl was typically held in the Orange Bowl stadium in Miami. It led to Super Bowl II being held in Miami, the first of 11 Super Bowls held in Miami area, and is credited by NFL Films for the creation of the expansion Miami Dolphins.

The 1966 season Playoff Bowl game was used by NFL Films to put a microphone on Philadelphia Eagles' head coach Joe Kuharich, which is credited by the league as part of the signature of NFL Films' videos featuring microphones on coaches and players.

That same Eagles-Colts Playoff Bowl marked the debut of the "slingshot" or "tuning fork" goalpost, with one curved support, in American football. This style of goalpost was first used by the Canadian Football League for the 54th Grey Cup the previous November. The NFL adopted the single-support post for the 1967 season, and it continues to be used by the NFL and CFL, as well as most colleges and many high schools in both countries.

One vestige of the Playoff Bowl remained through the 2008 season in that the head coaches of the losing teams from the conference championship games were the head coaches of their conferences' Pro Bowl teams. From 1980 to 2009, this all-star game was played at Aloha Stadium in Honolulu the Sunday following the Super Bowl. However, in 2010, the Pro Bowl moved to Miami Gardens, Florida, and was played the week before Super Bowl XLIV (as the Playoff Bowl was in the Super Bowl era).

For the 2009 season, a new rule for determining the Pro Bowl coaches resulted in the disappearance of one Playoff Bowl legacy. The coaching staffs for the 2010 Pro Bowl did not come from the losers of the conference championship games, but instead from the teams with the best regular-season records among those that lost in the divisional round of the playoffs in each conference.

== Playoff Bowl results ==
All ten games were played at the Orange Bowl in Miami, Florida. Most were played the week following the NFL Championship game, with two exceptions: the first was played two weeks after and the last the day before. The first two games and the last one were played on Saturday, with the rest being played on Sunday. The Western Conference team won eight of the ten games.

Season	Date	Winner	Score	Loser	Attendance
1960	January 7, 1961	Detroit Lions	17–16	Cleveland Browns	34,981
1961	January 6, 1962	Detroit Lions (2)	38–10	Philadelphia Eagles	25,612
1962	January 6, 1963	Detroit Lions (3)	17–10	Pittsburgh Steelers	36,284
1963	January 5, 1964	Green Bay Packers	40–23	Cleveland Browns	54,921
1964	January 3, 1965	St. Louis Cardinals	24–17	Green Bay Packers	56,218
1965	January 9, 1966	Baltimore Colts	35–3	Dallas Cowboys	65,569
1966	January 8, 1967	Baltimore Colts (2)	20–14	Philadelphia Eagles	58,088
1967	January 7, 1968	Los Angeles Rams	30–6	Cleveland Browns	37,102
1968	January 5, 1969	Dallas Cowboys	17–13	Minnesota Vikings	22,961
1969	January 3, 1970	Los Angeles Rams (2)	31–0	Dallas Cowboys	31,151

=== Records by team ===
Games	Team	W	L	PCT	Won (3rd)	Lost (4th)
3	Detroit Lions	3	0	1.000	1960, 1961, 1962	
3	Dallas Cowboys	1	2	.333	1968	1965, 1969
3	Cleveland Browns	0	3	.000		1960, 1963, 1967
2	Baltimore Colts	2	0	1.000	1965, 1966	
2	Los Angeles Rams	2	0	1.000	1967, 1969	
2	Green Bay Packers	1	1	.500	1963	1964
2	Philadelphia Eagles	0	2	.000		1961, 1966
1	St. Louis Cardinals	1	0	1.000	1964	
1	Minnesota Vikings	0	1	.000		1968
1	Pittsburgh Steelers	0	1	.000		1962

== Broadcasters ==
Season	Network	Play-by-play	Color commentator(s)	Sideline reporter(s)
1960	CBS	Ken Coleman (first half) and Van Patrick (second half)	Johnny Lujack	
1961	CBS	Chris Schenkel (first half) and Van Patrick (second half)	Johnny Lujack	
1962	CBS	Chris Schenkel (first half) and Ray Scott (second half)	Warren Lahr	
1963	CBS	Ray Scott (first half) and Ken Coleman (second half)	Frank Gifford	
1964	CBS	Jack Drees (first half) and Earl Gillespie (second half)	Frank Gifford	
1965	CBS	Frank Glieber (first half) and Chuck Thompson (second half)	Pat Summerall	
1966	CBS	Chuck Thompson	Tom Brookshier	
1967	CBS	Frank Glieber	Frank Gifford	
1968	CBS	Ray Scott	Paul Christman	Frank Glieber
1969	CBS	Jack Whitaker	Frank Gifford and Don Perkins	
