= 1960 NFL season =

American football season

Regular season
- Duration: September 23 – December 18, 1960
- East Champions: Philadelphia Eagles
- West Champions: Green Bay Packers

Championship Game
- Champions: Philadelphia Eagles

NFL teams: West, East

The 1960 NFL season was the 41st regular season of the National Football League.

Before the season, on January 26, 33-year-old Pete Rozelle, the general manager of the Los Angeles Rams, was elected NFL commissioner as a compromise choice on the twenty-third ballot. Meanwhile, the league expanded to 13 teams on January 28 with the addition of the Dallas Cowboys, with a fourteenth team, the Minnesota Vikings, to start in 1961. Also, on March 13th, the Cardinals relocated from Chicago to St. Louis and became the St. Louis Cardinals, the same moniker as the National League baseball club.

In the championship game, the host Philadelphia Eagles defeated the Green Bay Packers by four points at Franklin Field. Two years earlier in 1958, both teams had finished in last place in their respective conferences, combining for only three wins. This loss was Vince Lombardi's only post-season defeat (excluding a loss in the third place Playoff Bowl game four years later) as an NFL head coach. Following this loss in 1960, Lombardi's Packers won five NFL championship games in seven years, and easily won the first two Super Bowls.

The NFL introduced the Playoff Bowl, a game for third place between the runners-up from each division. Played at the Orange Bowl in Miami, Florida, after the NFL Championship game, it benefitted the players' pension fund. The Detroit Lions played the Cleveland Browns in the inaugural game and the Lions won by a point, the first of three straight wins by Detroit in the series.

The two-time defending league champion Baltimore Colts led the Western Division after their bye in week 9 but lost the last four games to finish at .500 and fourth in the West. The New York Giants, winners of the Eastern Division the previous two seasons, won only one of their final five games and finished third in the East.

During this season, the American Football League (AFL) was launched as a competitor to the NFL. The two leagues co-existed for the entire 1960s, agreed to a merger in 1966, and became one combined league in 1970.

== Draft ==
The 1960 NFL draft was held on November 30, 1959, at Philadelphia's Warwick Hotel. With the first pick, the Los Angeles Rams selected running back Billy Cannon from Louisiana State University.

Because the league awarded the Dallas Cowboys franchise about two months later on January 28, 1960, this marked the only time that an NFL expansion team did not have the benefit of a college draft in its first year.

== Expansion draft ==
The 1960 NFL expansion draft was held on March 13, 1960, with the Dallas Cowboys selecting 36 players from the other 12 teams.

== Conference races ==
All teams but Dallas played a home-and-away game against the other five members of their own division, one inter-division game, and one game against the new team (Dallas): Dallas, although assigned to the Western Division, was a "swing team" and played each team once.

This was the final season for the 12-game schedule in the NFL.

A bye was required because of there being thirteen teams, with one team having a bye in each of the 13 weeks.

The Cowboys' first game saw them take a 14–0 lead over the Pittsburgh Steelers on a Saturday night at the Cotton Bowl, with Jim Doran catching a pass from Eddie LeBaron for the first score, but lost 35–28.

=== Eastern ===
Philadelphia lost its opener at home to Cleveland, 41–24, then went on a nine-game winning streak. The breakthrough came in Week Six on October 30, when unbeaten New York (3–0–1), two-time defending division champions, came off their bye and lost at home to St. Louis, 20–13, while the Browns and idle Eagles were both at 4–1. In Week Seven, New York beat Cleveland, 17–13, and the Eagles beat Pittsburgh 34–7. The Eagles clinched the Eastern Division after ten games at 9–1; they dropped a game the next week in the snow at Pittsburgh, and finished the regular season at 10–2, 1½ games ahead of Cleveland. Two of the wins in the streak were in consecutive games (November 20 and 27) against New York.

In the latter game, the Eagles trailed 17–0, then 23–17, before Norm Van Brocklin threw two touchdown passes in the final quarter for a 31–23 victory. In the former, the Giants' Frank Gifford was severely injured in a tackle by linebacker Chuck Bednarik late in the game that almost ended his career. New York entered that November 20 game at 5–1–1, but won only once in the last five games, including a tie against Dallas - the Cowboys lost their remaining eleven games that year - and finished third in the Eastern at 6–4–2. The Giants won the next three division championships for five in six seasons, but not the league title.

=== Western ===
The Western Division race was one in which Baltimore, Chicago, Detroit, Green Bay, and San Francisco all had a lead at one time.

The Bears fell back after a Week Six loss to the 49ers, 25–7. In Week Seven, the 4–2 Colts and the 4–1 Packers met on November 6 in Green Bay. Two-time defending NFL champion Baltimore, which had lost an earlier match, won 38–24, to take the lead in the Western. In Week Ten, the Colts (6–2) came off their bye and lost at home to San Francisco, 30–22, to begin a streak of four defeats. Baltimore's 20–15 loss to the Lions, and Green Bay's 41–13 win at Chicago, tied the Colts and Packers at 6–4 in Week Eleven. After the Packers' 13–0 win at San Francisco, their record was 7–4, while the Colts, Lions and 49ers were all at 6–5. While San Francisco and Detroit both won the next week, the former beating Baltimore 34–10, the Packers had won the day before, beating Los Angeles 35–21 for the Western title, their first in 16 years.

The new Dallas Cowboys lost their first ten games but managed a 31–31 tie against the Giants at Yankee Stadium in New York on December 4. They finished at 0–11–1: as ties were excluded in calculating winning percentage prior to 1972, the Cowboys had a winning percentage of .000, rather than .042.

Conference leaders

Week	Western	Record	Eastern	Record	Bye
1	Tie (Bal, Chi)	1–0–0	4 teams (Cle, NYG, Pit, St.L)	1–0–0	Detroit
2	Baltimore Colts	2–0–0	Tie (Cle, NYG)	2–0–0	Washington
3	4 teams (Bal, Chi, GB, SF)	2–1–0	New York Giants	3–0–0	Cleveland
4	Tie (Bal, Chi)	3–1–0	Tie (Cle, NYG (3–0–1))	3–0–0	Green Bay
5	Tie (GB, Chi (3–1–1))	3–1–0	New York Giants	3–0–1	New York
6	Green Bay Packers	4–1–0	Tie (Cle, Phi)	4–1–0	Philadelphia
7	Baltimore Colts	5–2–0	Philadelphia Eagles	5–1–0	Chicago
8	Baltimore Colts	6–2–0	Philadelphia Eagles	6–1–0	San Francisco
9	Baltimore Colts	6–2–0	Philadelphia Eagles	7–1–0	Baltimore
10	Baltimore Colts	6–3–0	Philadelphia Eagles	8–1–0	Los Angeles
11	3 teams (Bal, GB, SF)	6–4–0	Philadelphia Eagles (clinched)	9–1–0	Pittsburgh
12	Green Bay Packers	7–4–0	Philadelphia Eagles	9–2–0	St. Louis
13	Green Bay Packers (clinched)	8–4–0	Philadelphia Eagles	10–2–0	Dallas

- A bye was required in 1960, as the league had an odd number of teams (13); one team had the bye each week.
  The fourteenth team, Minnesota, would join the league in 1961, and the NFL subsequently initiated a 14-game regular season.

== Final standings ==
NFL Eastern Conference
	W	L	T	PCT	CONF	PF	PA	STK
Philadelphia Eagles	10	2	0	.833	8–2	321	246	W1
Cleveland Browns	8	3	1	.727	6–3–1	362	217	W3
New York Giants	6	4	2	.600	5–4–1	271	261	L1
St. Louis Cardinals	6	5	1	.545	4–5–1	288	230	W1
Pittsburgh Steelers	5	6	1	.455	4–5–1	240	275	L1
Washington Redskins	1	9	2	.100	0–8–2	178	309	L8

Note: Tie games were not officially counted in the standings until 1972.

NFL Western Conference
	W	L	T	PCT	CONF	PF	PA	STK
Green Bay Packers	8	4	0	.667	7–4	332	209	W3
Detroit Lions	7	5	0	.583	7–4	239	212	W4
San Francisco 49ers	7	5	0	.583	7–4	208	205	W1
Baltimore Colts	6	6	0	.500	5–6	288	234	L4
Chicago Bears	5	6	1	.455	5–5–1	194	299	L3
Los Angeles Rams	4	7	1	.364	4–6–1	265	297	L1
Dallas Cowboys	0	11	1	.000	0–6	177	369	L1

== Postseason ==
=== NFL Championship Game ===
- Philadelphia 17, Green Bay 13 at Franklin Field, University of Pennsylvania, in Philadelphia, Pennsylvania, on Monday, December 26.

=== Playoff Bowl ===
The Playoff Bowl was between the division runners-up, for third place in the league. This was its first year (of ten) and it was played three weeks after the regular season.

- Detroit 17, Cleveland 16 at the Orange Bowl in Miami, Florida, on Saturday, January 7, 1961.

=== Pro Bowl ===
- West 35, East 31 at the Los Angeles Memorial Coliseum in Los Angeles, California, on Sunday, January 15, 1961.

== Awards ==
Most Valuable Player	Norm Van Brocklin, quarterback, Philadelphia
Coach of the Year	Buck Shaw, Philadelphia

== Coaching changes ==
- Dallas Cowboys: Tom Landry became the expansion team's first head coach.
- Los Angeles Rams: Sid Gillman was replaced by former Rams quarterback Bob Waterfield. Gillman became coach of the Los Angeles Chargers of the American Football League.

== Stadium changes ==
- The expansion Dallas Cowboys began play at the Cotton Bowl, which they shared with the Dallas Texans of the American Football League
- The relocated St. Louis Cardinals moved to Busch Stadium (Sportsman's Park)

== See also ==
- 1960 American Football League season
