= Third place playoff =

Match in tournaments deciding third place

Many sports playoffs and knockout tournaments include a third place playoff, third place match, bronze final, bronze medal game, or consolation game to decide which competitor or team will be credited with finishing third and fourth. This game is typically competed by the competitors or teams that lost in the semi-finals of the tournament that they competed in. Some tournaments may use the third place playoff to determine who wins the bronze medal, while other tournaments need to hold a third place playoff for seeding purposes if three or all four semi-finalists advance to another tournament. Social psychology studies have found that bronze medalists who had won a third place playoff were significantly happier than silver medalists who had lost a championship final.

In tournaments that do not award medals or have the third place finisher advance to something else, a third place playoff is a classification match that serves little more than as a consolation to the losing semi-finalists. A consolation game also allows teams to play more than one game after having invested time, effort and money in the quest for a championship. Third place playoffs held as such consolation games are subject to debate. Many sports tournaments do not have a third place playoff due to a lack of interest. It has been criticised by some who feel that the match serves little purpose, but others see this game as an occasion for the losing semi-finalists to salvage some pride. How seriously the competitors or teams take a third place consolation game may also be mixed: a heavily favoured team that lost in an upset in the semi-final round may not have as much incentive to win as would a "Cinderella" team who was not expected to advance that far.

== Olympics ==
Most sports using a knockout format in the Olympic Games have a third place playoff to determine who wins the bronze medal. As the difference between a bronze medal and no medal is quite significant, competitors still take this seriously.

The martial arts and combat sports events instead award two bronze medals. Since the 1952 Summer Olympics, boxing has automatically awarded bronze medals to both losing semi-finalists, on the grounds that there was not enough time to recover between the semi-final bouts and a third place bout. Judo, taekwondo, and wrestling also award two bronze medals, but these feature two bronze medal matches between the losing semi-finalists and the winners of the repechage.

== Rugby World Cup ==
The Rugby World Cup used to give automatic qualification to all teams in the top three of the ongoing tournament to the one that would follow it four years later thus making the third place playoff game important, but this was later scrapped after the 1999 edition of the tournament allowing teams outside the top three to automatically qualify depending on their IRB co-efficient in the rankings.

== FIFA World Cup and other association football tournaments ==
The 1980 edition was the last UEFA European Championship to have a third place match. That was the only third place match in the tournament's history to be decided by a penalty shootout, where Czechoslovakia defeated hosts Italy 9–8 on penalties after a 1–1 draw.

The FIFA World Cup features a third place playoff, usually on the day before the final. It is often there to provide a spectacle as there is often a gap of a few days between the semi-finals and the final. The third place playoff is considered a lower-priority match to organizers, as it is frequently scheduled in one of the smaller stadia; the largest stadium (usually located in the host nation's capital city) is reserved for the final, while the semi-finals occupy the second and third-largest stadia. However, the third place match in the 1994 World Cup did use the Rose Bowl stadium, the same venue that would later host the tournament final, setting a record attendance of 91,500 for a third place playoff in FIFA World Cup history.

The UEFA Nations League also has a third place playoff; this game is played prior to the final on the same day.

The third-place match in the FIFA Women's World Cup has been somewhat more important to the organizers – the 1999, 2003, and 2007 matches were all held in the same stadium as the final. In fact, the 1999 and 2007 third-place matches were both held as the first half of a doubleheader that culminated in the final. The 2011 third-place match returned to the more traditional scheduling of the day before the final in a different stadium. Notably, the 1999 third-place match was the curtain-raiser to the most-attended women's sporting event in history, the 1999 final also held in the Rose Bowl.

The third place match is generally a high-scoring affair, as no men's match has seen fewer than two goals scored since Poland's 1–0 win over Brazil in 1974, with five out of the last nine bronze-medal games played since 1994 seeing four goals or more. For tournament top scorers, the third place match's tendency of attacking football is a great opportunity to win the Golden Shoe, with players such as Salvatore Schillaci (1990) and Davor Šuker (1998) getting the goal they needed to take sole possession of the lead. The FIFA Women's World Cup has had only eight editions to date, therefore creating less opportunity for a pattern to form. However, two of the third-place games in that competition have seen fewer than three goals. In 1995, the United States defeated China 2–0. In 1999, the third-place match between Brazil and Norway ended in a scoreless draw and penalty shootout (won by Brazil), as did the final between the United States and China (won by the United States). In 2015, the third place match between Germany and England was the first to go to extra time, and in the second period of extra time, England scored a single penalty and held on to the lead to upset Germany.

How seriously the competing teams take this match is subject to debate. Certain teams, especially ones which had been expected to reach the final, will rest some of their starters to allow some of their reserve team players to participate in a World Cup game. For instance French team captain Michel Platini did not play in either the 1982 or 1986 third place matches, while German goalkeeper Hans-Jörg Butt received his only competitive international appearance in a third place playoff, and Michel Vorm came on during injury time of the 3–0 third place play-off win against Brazil in Brasília thus ensuring that all 23 Dutch squad members played at the tournament. By contrast, teams that are not expected to get this far usually take this match seriously, as third place can be a historical achievement. In Sweden "third place playoff" is called "bronze game" and in the 1994 World Cup, the Sweden national team, after the victory in the "bronze game", landed at Arlanda with a fighter escort and were then paraded through the streets of Stockholm to millions live on national TV. Another example of a high-profile third place match was in 1998, when the recently established Croatian football team upset the Netherlands.

If the host nation is involved in the third place match, the team generally uses the match to thank the support of their fans (such as the South Korean football team in 2002, and the German football team in 2006). German goalkeeper Oliver Kahn, who had been a reserve to Jens Lehmann during the 2006 tournament, was allowed to retire in the third place playoff by then manager Jürgen Klinsmann. Germany and Portugal fielded strong lineups in that match, after both were narrowly eliminated in their respective semi-finals (Germany and Italy nearly went to penalties, while Portugal was defeated by France). For Brazil, the dismal 3–0 loss to the Netherlands in the 2014 third place match, along with the 7–1 semi-final defeat to Germany, led to coach Luiz Felipe Scolari being dismissed. For the Dutch, this was their first bronze medal in the FIFA World Cup.

Germany currently holds the most third-place finishes in the men's World Cup, with four, their most recent in 2010. Sweden has the most third-place finishes in the Women's World Cup, with four.

In 2026, FIFA announced that the third place playoff would now be referred to as the "Bronze final".

== Professional basketball ==
The Big3 professional 3-on-3 basketball league features a post-season game for third place; the game is played directly before the league's championship and features the teams who were eliminated in the semifinals. The FIBA World Cup has a third-place game.

== College basketball ==
Third place games (and consolation games for lower placings) are common in early season college basketball tournaments, as it gives each team an opportunity to play more games before the conference games start in earnest. It also provides the tournament venue with additional games.

The NCAA Division I men's basketball tournament held regional third-place games until 1975, and national third-place games until 1981.

== Little League World Series ==
For most of its history, the Little League World Series has featured either a consolation bracket, or consolation games. Currently, the tournament features a single consolation game between the United States runner-up and the International runner-up. Like the championship, the game allows an American team to compete against an International team. All other games are played in a double-elimination format within their respective American or International pool of ten teams each.

== Defunct third-place playoff games ==
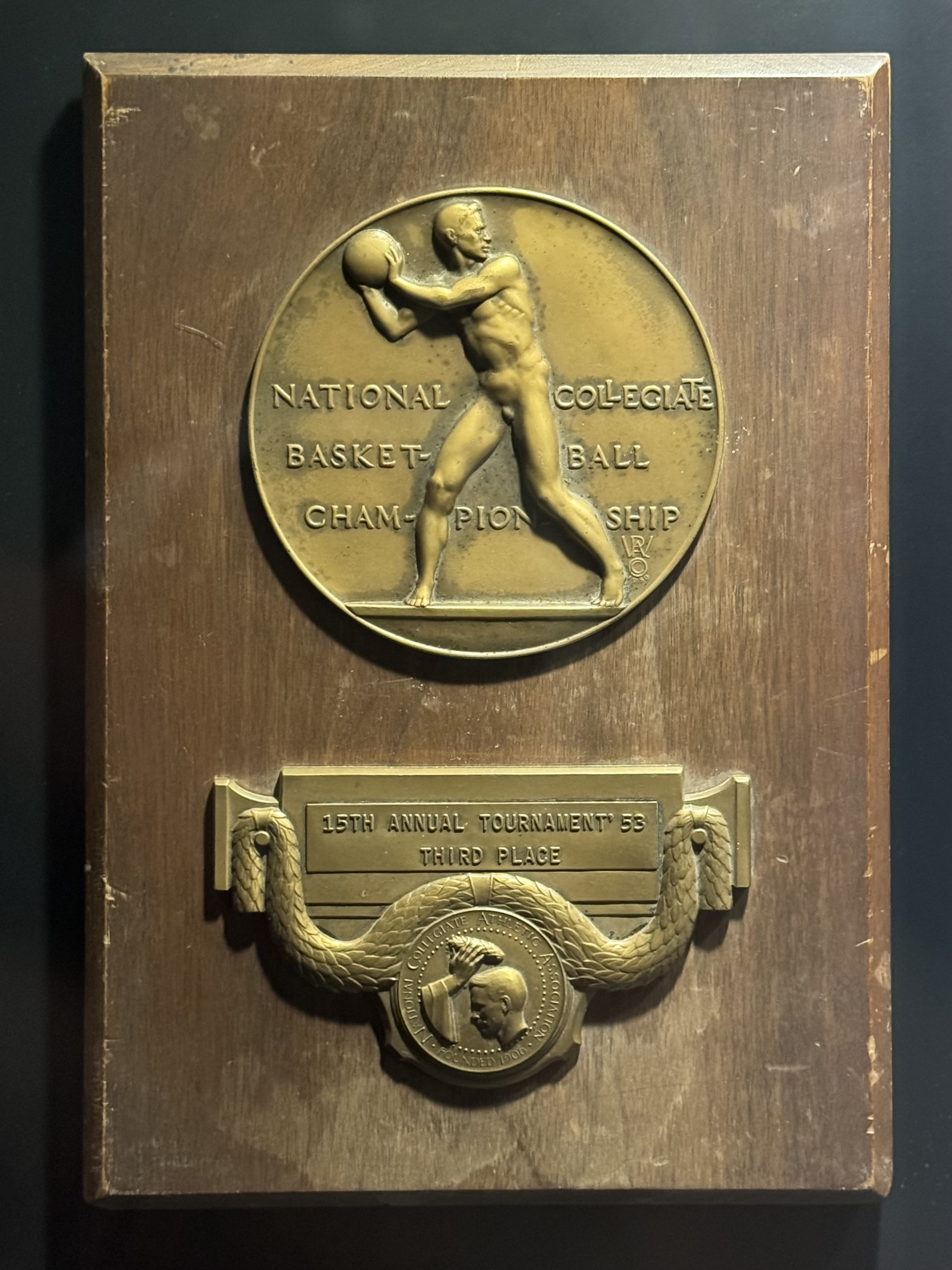
1953 NCAA Basketball Tournament third place plaque awarded to players of the Washington Huskies

Many sports tournaments do not have a third-place playoff, mostly due to a lack of interest from the competitors and also from the fans. Several of the most celebrated knockout tournaments did feature a game for a period of time, but later abandoned it – for example, the FA Cup third-fourth place matches (1970–1974), the UEFA European Championships (1960–1980), and the NCAA Division I men's basketball tournament (1946–1981). At the NCAA tourney, the third-place game was usually played immediately preceding the championship game, but was not nationally televised. Until 1976, the NCAA had consolation games in both regional play and the Final Four. However, as the field expanded beyond 32 teams, the game lost significance; the regional third-place games were not played after 1975, and the last national third-place game was in 1981. Eliminating the game also allowed the losing teams of the semifinals to return home rather than remaining in the Final Four city for an additional two days to play a game holding much less interest than the championship.

The National Football League (NFL) had a consolation game for ten seasons, the Playoff Bowl, from 1960 through 1969, which pitted the second-place team in each of the two conferences (based on regular season record from 1960 to 1966) against each other in Miami, Florida. Through the 1966 season, the only scheduled NFL playoff game was the Championship Game (with unscheduled conference tie-breaker games as necessary; only once during the 1960s, in 1965, was this required.

In 1967, the NFL playoff field expanded to four (division winners), with its first-round losers going to the Playoff Bowl, which had become increasingly unpopular with participating players, fans, and officials. With interest declining for a third-place game, and an eight-team playoff field arriving with the AFL–NFL merger in 1970, the Playoff Bowl was abandoned after the 1969 season with minimal objection. One vestige of the game survived into the 21st century: the losing coaches in each conference championship game coached the respective Pro Bowl squads from 1970–1978 and 1982–2008.

The Philippine Basketball Association, from its inception in 1975, also had third place playoffs, billed as "Battle for Third", preceding its conferences' playoff finals until this was removed the end of the 2009–10 season. These were originally as long as the finals series itself until 1988, when it was shortened to one win less than the finals (so if the finals was a best-of-seven playoff, the third place playoffs is best-of-five). In 1995, it was shortened further to a best-of-three series. From 1996 to 2010, it was a single-game playoff, until it was abandoned starting from the 2010–11 season.

== Criticism of use in the Page playoff system ==
Third place playoffs are especially controversial when they are used in tournaments that use a Page playoff system since there is only one semi-final game in this format.

Critics argue that in such a formula, the loser of the semi-final should simply be awarded third place, while proponents of the third place game argue that without it, the importance of the medal round is lowered since the top two teams heading into the Page playoff would otherwise be guaranteed a medal: this argument carries less weight in tournaments where medals are not awarded, or are considered of relatively minor importance in comparison to winning the tournament.

== See also ==
- Classification match
- Single-elimination tournament
