= 1961 Minnesota Vikings season =

NFL team season (inaugural)

- General manager: Bert Rose
- Head coach: Norm Van Brocklin
- Home stadium: Metropolitan Stadium

Results
- Record: 3–11
- Division place: 7th NFL Western
- Playoffs: Did not qualify
- Pro Bowlers: RB Hugh McElhenny; TE Jerry Reichow

Uniform
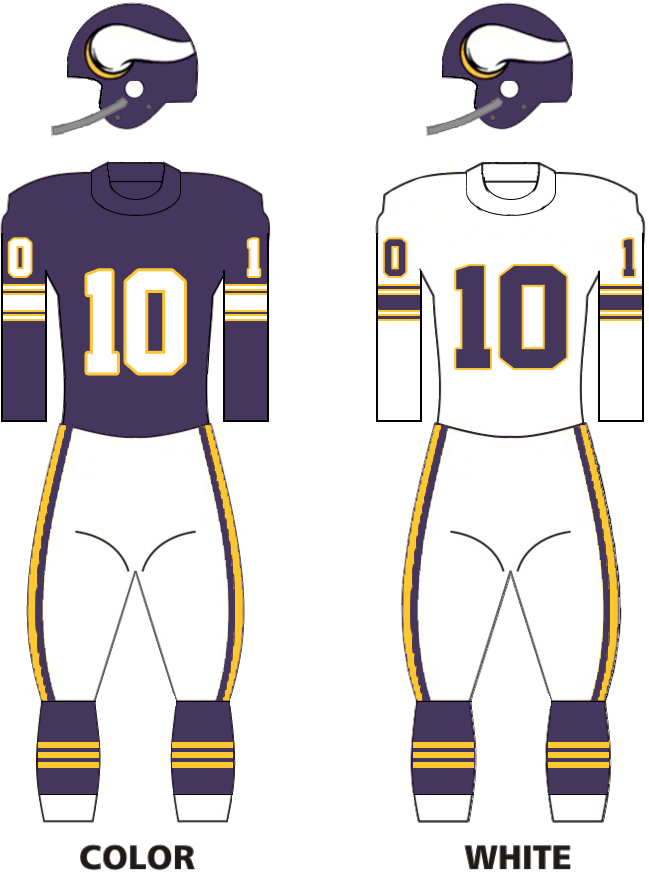

The 1961 season was the Minnesota Vikings' first in the National Football League (NFL) after being created as an expansion franchise to become the league's fourteenth team. Their inaugural regular season game was a 37–13 victory at home to the Chicago Bears; rookie quarterback Fran Tarkenton came off the bench to toss four touchdown passes and run for another. However, under head coach Norm Van Brocklin, the Vikings won just two of their remaining 13 games, including a seven-game losing streak, and finished the season with a 3–11 record.

The Vikings' defense surrendered 5.41 rushing yards per attempt in 1961, the fifth-most of all time.

== Offseason ==
Although the NFL originally had no interest in expanding, after Max Winter and Bill Boyer agreed to start an American Football League (AFL) franchise in Minnesota, the NFL approached them to change leagues. The "Vikings" name was given to the team by Ole Haugsrud, who had been given a 10% stake in the franchise as a result of having sold the Duluth Eskimos back to the league in the 1920s.

=== 1961 expansion draft ===
Player name	Position	College	Acquired from
Grady Alderman	Guard	Detroit	Detroit Lions
Tom Barnett	Running back	Purdue	Pittsburgh Steelers
Byron Beams	Offensive tackle	Notre Dame	Pittsburgh Steelers
Ken Beck	Defensive tackle	Texas A&M	Green Bay Packers
Bill Bishop	Defensive tackle	North Texas State	Chicago Bears
Don Boll	Offensive tackle	Nebraska	New York Giants
Ed Culpepper	Defensive tackle	Alabama	St. Louis Cardinals
Don Ellersick	Defensive back	Washington State	Los Angeles Rams
Dick Haley	Cornerback	Pittsburgh	Washington Redskins
Gerry Huth	Guard	Wake Forest	Philadelphia Eagles
Charlie Janerette	Guard	Penn State	Los Angeles Rams
Gene Johnson	Defensive back	Cincinnati	Philadelphia Eagles
Don Joyce	Defensive end	Tulane	Baltimore Colts
Bill Kimber	End	Florida State	New York Giants
Bill Lapham	Center	Iowa	Philadelphia Eagles
Hugh McElhenny	Running back	Washington	San Francisco 49ers
Dave Middleton	End	Auburn	Detroit Lions
Jack Morris	Defensive back	Oregon	Pittsburgh Steelers
Rich Mostardi	Defensive back	Kent State	Cleveland Browns
Fred Murphy	End	Georgia Tech	Cleveland Browns
Clancy Osborne	Linebacker	Arizona State	San Francisco 49ers
Dick Pesonen	Defensive back	Minnesota–Duluth	Green Bay Packers
Mike Rabold	Guard	Indiana	St. Louis Cardinals
Perry Richards	End	Detroit	St. Louis Cardinals
Bill Roehnelt	Linebacker	Bradley	Washington Redskins
Karl Rubke	Linebacker	USC	San Francisco 49ers
Gene Selawski	Offensive tackle	Purdue	Cleveland Browns
Glenn Shaw	Fullback	Kentucky	Chicago Bears
Lebron Shields	Defensive tackle	Tennessee	Baltimore Colts
Zeke Smith	Linebacker	Auburn	Baltimore Colts
Jerry Stalcup	Linebacker	Wisconsin	Los Angeles Rams
Louis Stephens	Guard	San Francisco	Washington Redskins
Charlie Sumner	Safety	William & Mary	Chicago Bears
Dave Whitsell	Cornerback	Indiana	Detroit Lions
Paul Winslow	Running back	North Carolina Central	Green Bay Packers
Frank Youso	Offensive tackle	Minnesota	New York Giants

=== 1961 draft ===
Pro Bowler
Hall of Famer

1961 Minnesota Vikings Draft
Draft order		Player name	Position	College	Notes
Round	Overall	Player name	Position	College	Notes
1	1	Tommy Mason	RB	Tulane	
2	15	Rip Hawkins	LB	North Carolina	
3	29	Fran Tarkenton	QB	Georgia	
4	43	Chuck Lamson	S	Wyoming	
5	57	Ed Sharockman	CB	Pittsburgh	
6	71	Jerry Burch	E	Georgia Tech	
7	85	Allan Ferrie	E	Wagner	
8	99	Paul Lindquist	DT	New Hampshire	
9	113	Dan Sheehan	OT	Chattanooga	
10	127	Doug Mayberry	FB	Utah State	
11	141	Jerry Mays	DE	SMU	
12	155	Steve Stonebreaker	LB	Detroit	
13	169	Ray Hayes	FB	Central State (OK)	
14	183	Ken Petersen	G	Utah	
15	197	Mike Mercer	K	Arizona State	
16	211	Ted Karpowicz	HB	Detroit	
17	225	Willie Jones	FB	Purdue	
18	239	Bob Voigt	DT	Los Angeles State	
19	253	Bill Hill	FB	Presbyterian	
20	267	Mike McFarland	QB	Western Illinois	

=== Undrafted free agents ===
1961 undrafted free agents of note
Player	Position	College
Ken Baird	Running back	Bethel
Glenn Harke	Wide receiver	Wisconsin–Stout

== Roster ==
1961 Minnesota Vikings roster
Quarterbacks (QB): 14 George Shaw; 10 Fran Tarkenton; Running backs (RB): 23 Jamie Caleb; 44 Billy Gault; 32 Ray Hayes; 20 Tommy Mason; 35 Doug Mayberry; 39 Hugh McElhenny; 33 Mel Triplett; Wide receivers (WR): 84 Dave Middleton; 89 Jerry Reichow; 82 A. D. Williams; Tight ends (TE): 88 Fred Murphy; 87 Gordon Smith	Offensive linemen (OL): 67 Grady Alderman T; 62 Bob Denton T/G; 52 Bill Lapham C; 65 Gerry Huth G; 66 Ken Petersen C/G; 64 Mike Rabold G; 72 Frank Youso T; Defensive linemen (DL): 73 Bill Bishop DT; 71 Ed Culpepper DT; 76 Paul Dickson DT; 83 Don Joyce DE; 59 Jim Leo DE; 70 Jim Marshall DE; 79 Jim Prestel DT; 77 Lebron Shields DE	Linebackers (LB): 50 Dick Grecni OLB/MLB; 58 Rip Hawkins MLB; 31 Clancy Osborne OLB; 54 Karl Rubke OLB; Defensive backs (DB): 25 Dean Derby SS; 40 Jack Morris CB; 24 Rich Mostardi SS/FS; 22 Dick Pesonen CB; 47 Justin Rowland CB; 45 Ed Sharockman CB; 43 Will Sherman FS; 26 Charlie Sumner FS; Special teams (ST): 18 Mike Mercer K/P	Reserve: Paul Winslow WR (IR); John Wilkins T (IR); Rookies in italics

== Preseason ==
Week	Date	Opponent	Result	Record	Venue	Attendance
1	August 5	Dallas Cowboys	L 13–38	0–1	Howard Wood Field (Sioux Falls, SD)	4,954
2	August 18	at Baltimore Colts	L 3–13	0–2	Memorial Stadium	10,203
3	August 26	at San Francisco 49ers	L 10–14	0–3	Multnomah Stadium (Portland, OR)	27,044
4	September 2	Chicago Bears	L 7–30	0–4	Kingston Stadium (Cedar Rapids, IA)	12,500
5	September 10	Los Angeles Rams	L 17–21	0–5	Metropolitan Stadium	27,982

== Regular season ==
=== Schedule ===
Week	Date	Opponent	Result	Record	Venue	Attendance
1	September 17	Chicago Bears	W 37–13	1–0	Metropolitan Stadium	32,236
2	September 24	at Dallas Cowboys	L 7–21	1–1	Cotton Bowl	20,500
3	October 1	at Baltimore Colts	L 33–34	1–2	Memorial Stadium	54,259
4	October 8	Dallas Cowboys	L 0–28	1–3	Metropolitan Stadium	33,070
5	October 15	San Francisco 49ers	L 24–38	1–4	Metropolitan Stadium	34,415
6	October 22	Green Bay Packers	L 7–33	1–5	Metropolitan Stadium	42,007
7	October 29	at Green Bay Packers	L 10–28	1–6	Milwaukee County Stadium	44,112
8	November 5	at Los Angeles Rams	L 17–31	1–7	Los Angeles Memorial Coliseum	38,594
9	November 12	Baltimore Colts	W 28–20	2–7	Metropolitan Stadium	38,010
10	November 19	Detroit Lions	L 10–37	2–8	Metropolitan Stadium	32,296
11	November 26	at San Francisco 49ers	L 28–38	2–9	Kezar Stadium	43,905
12	December 3	Los Angeles Rams	W 42–21	3–9	Metropolitan Stadium	30,068
13	December 10	at Detroit Lions	L 7–13	3–10	Tiger Stadium	42,655
14	December 17	at Chicago Bears	L 35–52	3–11	Wrigley Field	34,539

=== Game summaries ===
==== Week 1: vs. Chicago Bears ====
Week 1: Chicago Bears at Minnesota Vikings – Game summary

Quarter	1	2	3	4	Total
Bears	0	6	0	7	13
Vikings	3	7	14	13	37

at Metropolitan Stadium, Bloomington, Minnesota

- Date: September 17
- Game time: 12:00 p.m. CST
- Game weather: 61 °F (16 °C)
- Game attendance: 52,364
- Pro-Football-Reference.com

Game information

First quarter

- MIN – Mike Mercer 12-yard field goal. Vikings 3–0.

Second quarter

- MIN – Bob Schnelker 14-yard pass from Fran Tarkenton (Mike Mercer kick). Vikings 10–0.
- CHI – Rick Casares 3-yard run (kick failed). Vikings 10–6.

Third quarter

- MIN – Jerry Reichow 29-yard pass from Fran Tarkenton (Mike Mercer kick). Vikings 17–6.
- MIN – Hugh McElhenny 2-yard pass from Fran Tarkenton (Mike Mercer kick). Vikings 24–6.

Fourth quarter

- MIN – Fran Tarkenton 2-yard run (Mike Mercer kick). Vikings 31–6.
- MIN – Dave Middleton 2-yard pass from Fran Tarkenton (kick failed). Vikings 37–6.
- CHI – Willie Galimore 10-yard pass from Bill Wade (Roger LeClerc kick). Vikings 37–13.

Top passers

- CHI – Bill Wade – 6/10, 109 yards, TD
- MIN – Fran Tarkenton – 17/23, 250 yards, 4 TD

Top rushers

- CHI – Willie Galimore – 12 rushes, 47 yards
- MIN – Mel Triplett – 8 rushes, 26 yards

Top receivers

- CHI – Johnny Morris – 4 receptions, 92 yards
- MIN – Jerry Reichow – 3 receptions, 103 yards, TD

This was the first regular season game in Vikings history. George Shaw started the game at quarterback for the Vikings, but he was soon replaced by rookie Fran Tarkenton, who threw four touchdown passes and ran for another as the Vikings won 37–13. They were the last expansion team to win their first game until the 1996 Baltimore Ravens.

==== Week 2: at Dallas Cowboys ====
Week 2: Minnesota Vikings at Dallas Cowboys – Game summary

Quarter	1	2	3	4	Total
Vikings	0	7	0	0	7
Cowboys	7	7	0	7	21

at Cotton Bowl, Dallas, Texas

- Date: September 24
- Game weather: 82 °F (28 °C)
- Pro-Football-Reference.com

Game information

First quarter

- DAL – Amos Marsh 6-yard run (Allen Green kick). Cowboys 7–0.

Second quarter

- DAL – Don Meredith 20-yard run (Allen Green kick). Cowboys 14–0.
- MIN – Tommy Mason 4-yard run (Mike Mercer kick). Cowboys 14–7.

Third quarter

- No scoring plays.

Fourth quarter

- DAL – Amos Marsh 20-yard pass from Don Meredith (Allen Green kick). Cowboys 21–7.

Top passers

- MIN – Fran Tarkenton – 8/24, 117 yards
- DAL – Don Meredith – 12/22, 163 yards, TD

Top rushers

- MIN – Mel Triplett – 9 rushes, 57 yards
- DAL – Don Perkins – 17 rushes, 108 yards

Top receivers

- MIN – A. D. Williams – 4 receptions, 78 yards
- DAL – Don Perkins – 5 receptions, 61 yards

==== Week 3: at Baltimore Colts ====
Week 3: Minnesota Vikings at Baltimore Colts – Game summary

Quarter	1	2	3	4	Total
Vikings	3	10	10	10	33
Colts	7	7	7	13	34

at Memorial Stadium, Baltimore, Maryland

- Date: October 1
- Game weather: 58 °F (14 °C)
- Pro-Football-Reference.com

Game information

First quarter

- MIN – Mike Mercer 20-yard field goal. Vikings 3–0.
- BAL – Lenny Moore 72-yard pass from Johnny Unitas (Steve Myhra kick). Colts 7–3.

Second quarter

- MIN – A. D. Williams 7-yard pass from George Shaw (Mike Mercer kick). Vikings 10–7.
- BAL – Lenny Moore 4-yard run (Steve Myhra kick). Colts 14–10.
- MIN – Mike Mercer 26-yard field goal. Colts 14–13.

Third quarter

- BAL – Lenny Morre 17-yard pass from Lamar McHan (Steve Myhra kick). Colts 21–13.
- MIN – Mike Mercer 10-yard field goal. Colts 21–16.
- MIN – Jerry Reichow 23-yard pass from George Shaw (Mike Mercer kick). Vikings 23–21.

Fourth quarter

- BAL – Lenny Morre 23-yard pass from Johnny Unitas (Steve Myhra kick). Colts 28–23.
- MIN – Ray Hayes 4-yard run (Mike Mercer kick). Vikings 30–28.
- BAL – Steve Myhra 37-yard field goal. Colts 31–30.
- MIN – Mike Mercer 29-yard field goal. Vikings 33–31.
- BAL – Steve Myhra 52-yard field goal. Colts 34–33.

Top passers

- MIN – George Shaw – 17/30, 208 yards, 2 TD
- BAL – Johnny Unitas – 13/27, 284 yards, 2 TD

Top rushers

- MIN – Tommy Mason – 10 rushes, 45 yards
- BAL – Johnny Unitas – 2 rushes, 26 yards

Top receivers

- MIN – Ray Hayes – 4 receptions, 69 yards
- BAL – Lenny Moore – 5 receptions, 143 yards, 3 TD

==== Week 4: vs. Dallas Cowboys ====
Week 4: Dallas Cowboys at Minnesota Vikings – Game summary

Quarter	1	2	3	4	Total
Cowboys	7	7	7	7	28
Vikings	0	0	0	0	0

at Metropolitan Stadium, Bloomington, Minnesota

- Date: October 8
- Game weather: 66 °F (19 °C)
- Pro-Football-Reference.com

Game information

First quarter

- DAL – Billy Howton 12-yard pass from Don Meredith (Allen Green kick). Cowboys 7–0.

Second quarter

- DAL – Don Perkins 3-yard run (Allen Green kick). Cowboys 14–0'

Third quarter

- DAL – Frank Clarke 23-yard pass from Eddie LeBaron (Allen Green kick). Cowboys 21–0.

Fourth quarter

- DAL – Frank Clarke 52-yard pass from Don Meredith (Allen Green kick). Cowboys 28–0.

Top passers

- DAL – Don Meredith – 8/16, 124 yards, 2 TD
- MIN – Fran Tarkenton – 10/21, 151 yards

Top rushers

- DAL – Don Perkins – 19 rushes, 73 yards, TD
- MIN – Mel Triplett – 9 rushes, 44 yards

Top receivers

- DAL – Franklin Clarke – 3 receptions, 91 yards, 2 TD
- MIN – Jerry Reichow – 4 receptions, 74 yards

==== Week 5: vs. San Francisco 49ers ====
Week 5: San Francisco 49ers at Minnesota Vikings – Game summary

Quarter	1	2	3	4	Total
49ers	7	7	10	14	38
Vikings	7	10	7	0	24

at Metropolitan Stadium, Bloomington, Minnesota

- Date: October 15
- Game weather: 56 °F (13 °C)
- Pro-Football-Reference.com

Game information

First quarter

- SF – Bob Waters 6-yard run (Tommy Davis kick). 49ers 7–0.
- MIN – Hugh McElhenny 13-yard run (Mike Mercer kick). Tied 7–7.

Second quarter

- MIN – Jerry Reichow 42-yard pass from George Shaw (Mike Mercer kick). Vikings 14–7.
- MIN – Mike Mercer 24-yard field goal. Vikings 17–7.
- SF – Billy Kilmer 1-yard run (Tommy Davis kick). Vikings 17–14.

Third quarter

- SF – Billy Kilmer 2-yard run (Tommy Davis kick). 49ers 21–17.
- MIN – Hugh McElhenny 32-yard run (Mike Mercer kick). Vikings 24–21.
- SF – Tommy Davis 12-yard field goal. Tied 24–24.

Fourth quarter

- SF – Billy Kilmer 5-yard run (Tommy Davis kick). 49ers 31–24.
- SF – Billy Kilmer 20-yard run (Tommy Davis kick). 49ers 38–24.

Top passers

- SF – John Brodie – 11/14, 209 yards
- MIN – George Shaw – 7/17, 85 yards, TD

Top rushers

- SF – Billy Kilmer – 20 rushes, 115 yards, 4 TD
- MIN – Hugh McElhenny – 10 rushes, 81 yards

Top receivers

- SF – Monty Stickles – 5 receptions, 102 yards
- MIN – Jerry Reichow – 2 receptions, 54 yards, TD

==== Week 6: vs. Green Bay Packers ====
Week 6: Green Bay Packers at Minnesota Vikings – Game summary

Quarter	1	2	3	4	Total
Packers	10	3	3	17	33
Vikings	0	7	0	0	7

at Metropolitan Stadium, Bloomington, Minnesota

- Date: October 22
- Game weather: 48 °F (9 °C)
- Pro-Football-Reference.com

Game information

First quarter

- GB – Boyd Dowler 78-yard pass from Bart Starr (Paul Hornung kick). Packers 7–0'
- GB – Paul Hornung 14-yard field goal. Packers 10–0.

Second quarter

- MIN – Fran Tarkenton 1-yard run (Mike Mercer kick). Packers 10–7.
- GB – Paul Hornung 18-yard field goal. Packers 13–7.

Third quarter

- GB – Paul Hornung 13-yard field goal. Packers 16–7.

Fourth quarter

- GB – Paul Hornung 16-yard field goal. Packers 19–7.
- GB – Jim Taylor 3-yard run (Paul Hornung kick). Packers 26–7.
- GB – Dan Currie 21-yard interception return (Paul Hornung kick). Packers 33–7.

Top passers

- GB – Bart Starr – 9/19, 206 yards, TD
- MIN – Fran Tarkenton – 15/24, 130 yards

Top rushers

- GB – Tom Moore – 16 rushes, 159 yards
- MIN – Hugh McElhenny – 11 rushes, 57 yards

Top receivers

- GB – Boyd Dowler – 2 receptions, 100 yards, TD
- MIN – Jerry Reichow – 5 receptions, 50 yards

==== Week 7: at Green Bay Packers ====
Week 7: Minnesota Vikings at Green Bay Packers – Game summary

Quarter	1	2	3	4	Total
Vikings	0	7	3	0	10
Packers	14	7	0	7	28

at Milwaukee County Stadium, Milwaukee, Wisconsin

- Date: October 29
- Game weather: 57 °F (14 °C)
- Pro-Football-Reference.com

Game information

First quarter

- GB – Paul Hornung 1-yard run (Paul Hornung kick). Packers 7–0.
- GB – Ron Kramer 10-yard pass from Paul Hornung (Paul Hornung kick). Packers 14–0.

Second quarter

- GB – Jim Taylor 8-yard pass from Bart Starr (Paul Hornung kick). Packers 21–0.
- MIN – Jerry Reichow 19-yard pass from George Shaw (Mike Mercer kick). Packers 21–7.

Third quarter

- MIN – Mike Mercer 13-yard field goal. Packers 21–10.

Fourth quarter

- GB – Max McGee 23-yard pass from Bart Starr (Paul Hornung kick). Packers 28–10.

Top passers

- MIN – George Shaw – 9/18, 119 yards, TD
- GB – Bart Starr – 18/24, 311 yards, 2 TD

Top rushers

- MIN – Hugh McElhenny – 12 rushes, 99 yards
- GB – Paul Hornung – 12 rushes, 70 yards, TD

Top receivers

- MIN – Jerry Reichow – 4 receptions, 52 yards, TD
- GB – Boyd Dowler – 5 receptions, 121 yards

==== Week 8: at Los Angeles Rams ====
Week 8: Minnesota Vikings at Los Angeles Rams – Game summary

Quarter	1	2	3	4	Total
Vikings	7	3	7	0	17
Rams	14	3	0	14	31

at Los Angeles Memorial Coliseum, Los Angeles, California

- Date: November 5
- Game weather: 65 °F (18 °C)
- Pro-Football-Reference.com

Game information

First quarter

- LA – Jon Arnett 3-yard run (Danny Villanueva kick). Rams 7–0.
- LA – Ollie Matson 15-yard run (Danny Villanueva kick). Rams 14–0.
- MIN – Gordie Smith 29-yard pass from Fran Tarkenton (Mike Mercer kick). Rams 14–7.

Second quarter

- LA – Danny Villanueva 16-yard field goal. Rams 17–7.
- MIN – Mike Mercer 34-yard field goal. Rams 17–10.

Third quarter

- MIN – Fran Tarkenton 52-yard run (Mike Mercer kick). Tied 17–17.

Fourth quarter

- LA – Tommy Wilson 14-yard run (Danny Villanueva kick). Rams 24–17.
- LA – Joe Marconi 7-yard run (Danny Villanueva kick). Rams 31–17.

Top passers

- MIN – Fran Tarkenton – 12/19, 156 yards, TD
- LA – Frank Ryan – 6/16, 59 yards

Top rushers

- MIN – Fran Tarkenton – 11 rushes, 99 yards, TD
- LA – Ollie Matson – 8 rushes, 64 yards, TD

Top receivers

- MIN – Gordie Smith – 2 receptions, 49 yards, TD
- LA – Jon Arnett – 2 receptions, 36 yards

==== Week 9: vs. Baltimore Colts ====
Week 9: Baltimore Colts at Minnesota Vikings – Game summary

Quarter	1	2	3	4	Total
Colts	0	14	3	3	20
Vikings	7	7	7	7	28

at Metropolitan Stadium, Bloomington, Minnesota

- Date: November 12
- Game weather: 50 °F (10 °C)
- Pro-Football-Reference.com

Game information

First quarter

- MIN – Mel Triplett 1-yard run (Mike Mercer kick). Vikings 7–0.

Second quarter

- BAL – Alex Hawkins 2-yard run (Steve Myhra kick). Tied 7–7.
- MIN – Hugh McElhenny 1-yard run (Mike Mercer kick). Vikings 14–7.
- BAL – Lenny Moore 3-yard run (Steve Myhra kick). Tied 14–14.

Third quarter

- BAL – Steve Myhra 37-yard field goal. Colts 17–14.
- MIN – Dave Middleton 57-yard pass from Fran Tarkenton (Mike Mercer kick). Vikings 21–17.

Fourth quarter

- BAL – Steve Myhra 38-yard field goal. Vikings 21–20.
- MIN – Fran Tarkenton 1-yard run (Mike Mercer kick). Vikings 28–20.

Top passers

- BAL – Johnny Unitas – 14/31, 138 yards
- MIN – Fran Tarkenton – 11/18, 179 yards, TD

Top rushers

- BAL – Joe Perry – 19 rushes, 100 yards
- MIN – Fran Tarkenton – 11 rushes, 58 yards, TD

Top receivers

- BAL – Raymond Berry – 8 receptions, 86 yards
- MIN – Dave Middleton – 3 receptions, 76 yards, TD

==== Week 10: vs. Detroit Lions ====
Week 10: Detroit Lions at Minnesota Vikings – Game summary

Quarter	1	2	3	4	Total
Lions	0	14	9	14	37
Vikings	10	0	0	0	10

at Metropolitan Stadium, Bloomington, Minnesota

- Date: November 19
- Game weather: 23 °F (−5 °C)
- Pro-Football-Reference.com

Game information

First quarter

- MIN – Mike Mercer 13-yard field goal. Vikings 3–0.
- MIN – Jerry Reichow 23-yard pass from Fran Tarkenton (Mike Mercer kick). Vikings 10–0.

Second quarter

- DET – Nick Pietrosante 1-yard run (Jim Martin kick). Vikings 10–7.
- DET – Terry Barr 18-yard pass from Earl Morrall (Jim Martin kick). Lions 14–10.

Third quarter

- DET – Jim Martin 15-yard field goal. Lions 17–10.
- DET – Gail Cogdill 37-yard pass from Earl Morrall (kick failed). Lions 23–10.

Fourth quarter

- DET – Terry Barr 9-yard pass from Earl Morrall (Jim Martin kick). Lions 30–10.
- DET – Joe Schmidt 8-yard interception return (Jim Martin kick). Lions 37–10.

Top passers

- DET – Earl Morrall – 13/17, 154 yards, 3 TD
- MIN – Fran Tarkenton – 13/24, 116 yards, TD

Top rushers

- DET – Earl Morrall – 7 rushes, 62 yards
- MIN – Tommy Mason – 3 rushes, 36 yards

Top receivers

- DET – Terry Barr – 8 receptions, 97 yards, 2 TD
- MIN – Dave Middleton – 3 receptions, 60 yards

==== Week 11: at San Francisco 49ers ====
Week 11: Minnesota Vikings at San Francisco 49ers – Game summary

Quarter	1	2	3	4	Total
Vikings	0	14	7	7	28
49ers	14	10	7	7	38

at Kezar Stadium, San Francisco, California

- Date: November 26
- Game weather: 53 °F (12 °C)
- Pro-Football-Reference.com

Game information

First quarter

- SF – J. D. Smith 6-yard run (Tommy Davis kick). 49ers 7–0.
- SF – R. C. Owens 40-yard pass from John Brodie (Tommy Davis kick). 49ers 14–0.

Second quarter

- SF – C. R. Roberts 1-yard run (Tommy Davis kick). 49ers 21–0.
- MIN – Tommy Mason 9-yard run (Mike Mercer kick). 49ers 21–7.
- SF – Tommy Davis 42-yard field goal. 49ers 24–7.
- MIN – Jerry Reichow 17-yard pass from Fran Tarkenton (Mike Mercer kick). 49ers 24–14.

Third quarter

- SF – J. D. Smith 15-yard run (Tommy Davis kick). 49ers 31–14.
- MIN – Gordie Smith 71-yard pass from Fran Tarkenton (Mike Mercer kick). 49ers 31–21.

Fourth quarter

- SF – John Brodie 16-yard run (Tommy Davis kick). 49ers 38–21.
- MIN – Fran Tarkenton 1-yard run (Mike Mercer kick). 49ers 38–28.

Top passers

- MIN – Fran Tarkenton – 16/24, 277 yards, 2 TD
- SF – John Brodie – 14/24, 246 yards, TD

Top rushers

- MIN – Tommy Mason – 14 rushes, 62 yards, TD
- SF – J. D. Smith – 28 rushes, 168 yards, 2 TD

Top receivers

- MIN – Gordie Smith – 3 receptions, 123 yards, TD
- SF – R. C. Owens – 5 receptions, 138 yards, TD

==== Week 12: vs. Los Angeles Rams ====
Week 12: Los Angeles Rams at Minnesota Vikings – Game summary

Quarter	1	2	3	4	Total
Rams	0	14	7	0	21
Vikings	7	14	14	7	42

at Metropolitan Stadium, Bloomington, Minnesota

- Date: December 3
- Game weather: 37 °F (3 °C)
- Pro-Football-Reference.com

Game information

First quarter

- MIN – Hugh McElhenny 17-yard pass from Fran Tarkenton (Mike Mercer kick). Vikings 7–0.

Second quarter

- MIN – Tommy Mason 1-yard run (Mike Mercer kick). Vikings 14–0.
- LA – Ollie Matson 69-yard run (Danny Villanueva kick). Vikings 14–7.
- MIN – Jerry Reichow 51-yard pass from Fran Tarkenton (Mike Mercer kick). Vikings 21–7.
- LA – Red Phillips 10-yard pass from Zeke Bratkowski (Danny Villanueva kick). Vikings 21–14.

Third quarter

- LA – Dick Bass 73-yard run (Danny Villanueva kick). Tied 21–21.
- MIN – Jerry Reichow 9-yard pass from Fran Tarkenton (Mike Mercer kick). Vikings 28–21.
- MIN – Ray Hayes 2-yard run (Mike Mercer kick). Vikings 35–21.

Fourth quarter

- MIN – Gordie Smith 12-yard pass from Fran Tarkenton (Mike Mercer kick). Vikings 42–21.

Top passers

- LA – Zeke Bratkowski – 12/23, 153 yards, TD
- MIN – Fran Tarkenton – 21/30, 252 yards, 4 TD

Top rushers

- LA – Dick Bass – 8 rushes, 113 yards, TD
- MIN – Ray Hayes – 18 rushes, 123 yards, TD

Top receivers

- LA – Ollie Matson – 4 receptions, 75 yards
- MIN – Jerry Reichow – 6 receptions, 112 yards, 2 TD

==== Week 13: at Detroit Lions ====
Week 13: Minnesota Vikings at Detroit Lions – Game summary

Quarter	1	2	3	4	Total
Vikings	0	0	7	0	7
Lions	0	7	3	3	13

at Tiger Stadium, Detroit, Michigan

- Date: December 10
- Game weather: 36 °F (2 °C)
- Pro-Football-Reference.com

Game information

First quarter

- No scoring plays.

Second quarter

- DET – Jim Ninowski 7-yard run (Jim Martin kick). Lions 7–0.

Third quarter

- MIN – Hugh McElhenny 2-yard pass from Fran Tarkenton (Mike Mercer kick). Tied 7–7.
- DET – Jim Martin 43-yard field goal. Lions 10–7.

Fourth quarter

- DET – Jim Martin 23-yard field goal. Lions 13–7.

Top passers

- MIN – Fran Tarkenton – 15/34, 141 yards, TD
- DET – Jim Ninowski – 8/20, 157 yards

Top rushers

- MIN – Mel Triplett – 7 rushes, 53 yards
- DET – Dan Lewis – 12 rushes, 52 yards

Top receivers

- MIN – Jerry Reichow – 4 receptions, 69 yards
- DET – Jim Gibbons – 6 receptions, 84 yards

==== Week 14: at Chicago Bears ====
Week 14: Minnesota Vikings at Chicago Bears – Game summary

Quarter	1	2	3	4	Total
Vikings	14	7	7	7	35
Bears	7	14	24	7	52

at Wrigley Field, Chicago, Illinois

- Date: December 17
- Game weather: 33 °F (1 °C)
- Pro-Football-Reference.com

Game information

First quarter

- MIN – Hugh McElhenny 81-yard punt return (Mike Mercer kick). Vikings 7–0.
- MIN – Jerry Reichow 30-yard pass from Fran Tarkenton (Mike Mercer kick). Vikings 14–0.
- CHI – Angelo Coia 62-yard pass from Billy Wade (Roger LeClerc kick). Vikings 14–7.

Second quarter

- CHI – Willie Galimore 8-yard run (Roger LeClerc kick). Tied 14–14.
- CHI – Mike Ditka 2-yard pass from Billy Wade (Roger LeClerc kick). Bears 21–14.
- MIN – Jerry Reichow 11-yard pass from Fran Tarkenton (Mike Mercer kick). Tied 21–21.

Third quarter

- CHI – Angelo Coia 16-yard pass from Billy Wade (Roger LeClerc kick). Bears 28–21.
- CHI – Roger LeClerc 17-yard field goal. Bears 31–21.
- CHI – Mike Ditka 30-yard pass from Billy Wade (Roger LeClerc kick). Bears 38–21.
- MIN – Gordie Smith 10-yard pass from Fran Tarkenton (Mike Mercer kick). Bears 38–28.
- CHI – Charlie Bivins 30-yard run (Roger LeClerc kick). Bears 45–28.

Fourth quarter

- MIN – Jerry Reichow 24-yard pass from Fran Tarkenton (Mike Mercer kick). Bears 45–35.
- CHI – Willie Galimore 60-yard run (Roger LeClerc kick). Bears 52–35.

Top passers

- MIN – Fran Tarkenton – 12/22, 161 yards, 4 TD
- CHI – Bill Wade – 23/34, 355 yards, 4 TD

Top rushers

- MIN – Mel Triplett – 15 rushes, 121 yards
- CHI – Willie Galimore – 13 rushes, 97 yards, 2 TD

Top receivers

- MIN – Jerry Reichow – 6 receptions, 90 yards, 3 TD
- CHI – Mike Ditka – 8 receptions, 102 yards, 2 TD

=== Standings ===
NFL Western Conference
	W	L	T	PCT	CONF	PF	PA	STK
Green Bay Packers	11	3	0	.786	9–3	391	223	W1
Detroit Lions	8	5	1	.615	7–4–1	270	258	L1
Chicago Bears	8	6	0	.571	7–5	326	302	W2
Baltimore Colts	8	6	0	.571	6–6	302	307	W1
San Francisco 49ers	7	6	1	.538	6–5–1	346	272	L1
Los Angeles Rams	4	10	0	.286	3–9	263	333	L1
Minnesota Vikings	3	11	0	.214	3–9	285	407	L2

Note: Tie games were not officially counted in the standings until 1972.

== Awards and honors ==
Both halfback Hugh McElhenny and receiver (end) Jerry Reichow were voted to the East–West Pro Bowl game, played January 14, 1962, at the Los Angeles Memorial Coliseum. The coach for the West squad was Vikings head coach Norm Van Brocklin. McElhenny scored a third-quarter touchdown on a 10-yard pass from Green Bay Packers quarterback Bart Starr, and the West won the game 31–30.

== Statistics ==
=== Team leaders ===
Category	Player(s)	Value
Passing yards	Fran Tarkenton	1,997
Passing touchdowns	Fran Tarkenton	18
Rushing yards	Hugh McElhenny	570
Rushing touchdowns	Fran Tarkenton	5
Receiving yards	Jerry Reichow	859
Receiving touchdowns	Jerry Reichow	11
Points	Jerry Reichow	66
Kickoff return yards	Tommy Mason	603
Punt return yards	Hugh McElhenny	155
Interceptions	Rip Hawkins	5
Sacks	Jim Marshall	6

Note that sack totals from 1960 to 1981 are considered unofficial by the NFL.

=== League rankings ===
Category	Total yards	Yards per game	NFL rank (out of 14)
Passing offense	1,989	142.1	13th
Rushing offense	1,897	135.5	6th
Total offense	3,886	277.6	12th
Passing defense	2,926	209.0	13th
Rushing defense	2,667	190.5	14th
Total defense	5,593	399.5	14th
