= 1961 NFL expansion draft =

Selection of players by the Minnesota Vikings

General information
- Sport: American football
- Date: January 26, 1961

Overview
- League: NFL
- Expansion teams: Minnesota Vikings
- Expansion season: 1961

The 1961 NFL expansion draft was a National Football League (NFL) draft in which a new expansion team, named the Minnesota Vikings, selected its first players. That selection was provided by the expansion draft, held on January 26, 1961.

In August 1959, a group of Minneapolis businessmen were awarded a franchise in the new American Football League (AFL). In January 1960, they forfeited their AFL membership and were awarded a 90% stake in the 14th franchise of the NFL (the other 10%, under a decades-old agreement, went to former Duluth Kelleys/Eskimos owner Ole Haugsrud). Though the ownership group had participated in the 1960 American Football League draft before jumping leagues to the NFL, they did not take any of the players they selected in that draft with them. As such, they entered the 1961 draft with an empty roster. So that the Vikings could become competitive with existing teams, the league awarded the Vikings the first pick in the 1961 NFL draft and gave them the opportunity to select current players from existing teams. In the expansion draft, the existing franchises listed players from which the Vikings could select to switch to the new team.

== Rules of the draft ==
Every existing NFL team except the Dallas Cowboys listed eight of its 38 players, and the Vikings selected three players on the list from each team.

== Player selections ==
Player	Position	College team	Original NFL team
Grady Alderman	Guard	Detroit	Detroit Lions
Tom Barnett	Halfback	Purdue	Pittsburgh Steelers
Byron Beams	Tackle	Notre Dame	Pittsburgh Steelers
Ken Beck	Defensive tackle	Texas A&M	Green Bay Packers
Bill Bishop	Defensive tackle	North Texas State	Chicago Bears
Don Boll	Tackle	Nebraska	New York Giants
Ed Culpepper	Defensive tackle	Alabama	St. Louis Cardinals
Don Ellersick	Flanker	Washington State	Los Angeles Rams
Dick Haley	Defensive back	Pittsburgh	Washington Redskins
Gerry Huth	Guard	Wake Forest	Philadelphia Eagles
Charlie Janerette	Guard	Penn State	Los Angeles Rams
Gene Johnson	Defensive back	Cincinnati	Philadelphia Eagles
Don Joyce	Defensive end	Tulane	Baltimore Colts
Bill Kimber	End	Florida State	New York Giants
Bill Lapham	Center	Iowa	Philadelphia Eagles
Hugh McElhenny	Halfback	Washington	San Francisco 49ers
Dave Middleton	End	Auburn	Detroit Lions
Jack Morris	Defensive back	Oregon	Pittsburgh Steelers
Rich Mostardi	Defensive back	Kent State	Cleveland Browns
Fred Murphy	End	Georgia Tech	Cleveland Browns
Clancy Osborne	Linebacker	Arizona State	San Francisco 49ers
Dick Pesonen	Defensive back	Minnesota-Duluth	Green Bay Packers
Mike Rabold	Guard	Indiana	St. Louis Cardinals
Perry Richards	Split end	Detroit	St. Louis Cardinals
Bill Roehnelt	Linebacker	Bradley	Washington Redskins
Karl Rubke	Linebacker	USC	San Francisco 49ers
Gene Selawski	Tackle	Purdue	Cleveland Browns
Glenn Shaw	Fullback	Kentucky	Chicago Bears
Lebron Shields	Defensive tackle	Tennessee	Baltimore Colts
Zeke Smith	Linebacker	Auburn	Baltimore Colts
Jerry Stalcup	Linebacker	Wisconsin	Los Angeles Rams
Louis "Red" Stephens	Guard	San Francisco	Washington Redskins
Charlie Sumner	Defensive back	William & Mary	Chicago Bears
Dave Whitsell	Defensive back	Indiana	Detroit Lions
Paul Winslow	Halfback	North Carolina Central	Green Bay Packers
Frank Youso	Tackle	Minnesota	New York Giants

== See also ==
- 1961 American Football League draft
