= 1958 Chicago Bears season =

NFL team season

- Owner: George Halas
- General manager: George Halas
- Head coach: George Halas
- Home stadium: Wrigley Field

Results
- Record: 8–4
- Division place: T–2nd NFL Western
- Playoffs: Did not qualify

The 1958 season was the Chicago Bears' 39th in the National Football League. The team improved on their 5–7 record from 1957 and finished with an 8–4 record under George Halas; the owner took over again as head coach in February for the reassigned Paddy Driscoll. Halas's team improved to a respectable second place tie.

== Schedule ==
Game	Date	Opponent	Result	Record	Venue	Attendance	Recap	Sources
1	September 28	at **Green Bay Packers**	**W** 34–20	1–0	City Stadium	32,150	Recap	
2	October 4	at **Baltimore Colts**	**L** 38–51	1–1	Memorial Stadium	52,622	Recap	
3	October 12	**San Francisco 49ers**	**W** 28–6	2–1	Wrigley Field	45,310	Recap	
4	October 19	**Los Angeles Rams**	**W** 31–10	3–1	Wrigley Field	41,387	Recap	
5	October 26	at **San Francisco 49ers**	**W** 27–14	4–1	Kezar Stadium	59,441	Recap	
6	November 2	at **Los Angeles Rams**	**L** 35–41	4–2	L.A. Memorial Coliseum	100,740	Recap	
7	November 9	**Green Bay Packers**	**W** 24–10	5–2	Wrigley Field	48,424	Recap	
8	November 16	**Baltimore Colts**	**L** 0–17	5–3	Wrigley Field	48,664	Recap	
9	November 23	at **Detroit Lions**	**W** 20–7	6–3	Briggs Stadium	55,280	Recap	
10	November 30	at Pittsburgh Steelers	**L** 10–24	6–4	Forbes Field	20,094	Recap	
11	December 7	Chicago Cardinals	**W** 30–14	7–4	Wrigley Field	41,617	Recap	
12	December 14	**Detroit Lions**	**W** 21–16	8–4	Wrigley Field	38,346	Recap	
Note: Intra-conference opponents are in **bold** text.

- October 4 was a Saturday night game.

== Standings ==
NFL Western Conference
	W	L	T	PCT	CONF	PF	PA	STK
Baltimore Colts	9	3	0	.750	8–2	381	203	L2
Los Angeles Rams	8	4	0	.667	7–3	344	278	W3
Chicago Bears	8	4	0	.667	7–3	298	230	W2
San Francisco 49ers	6	6	0	.500	4–6	257	324	W2
Detroit Lions	4	7	1	.364	3–6–1	261	276	L2
Green Bay Packers	1	10	1	.091	0–9–1	193	382	L7

Note: Tie games were not officially counted in the standings until 1972.

== Roster ==
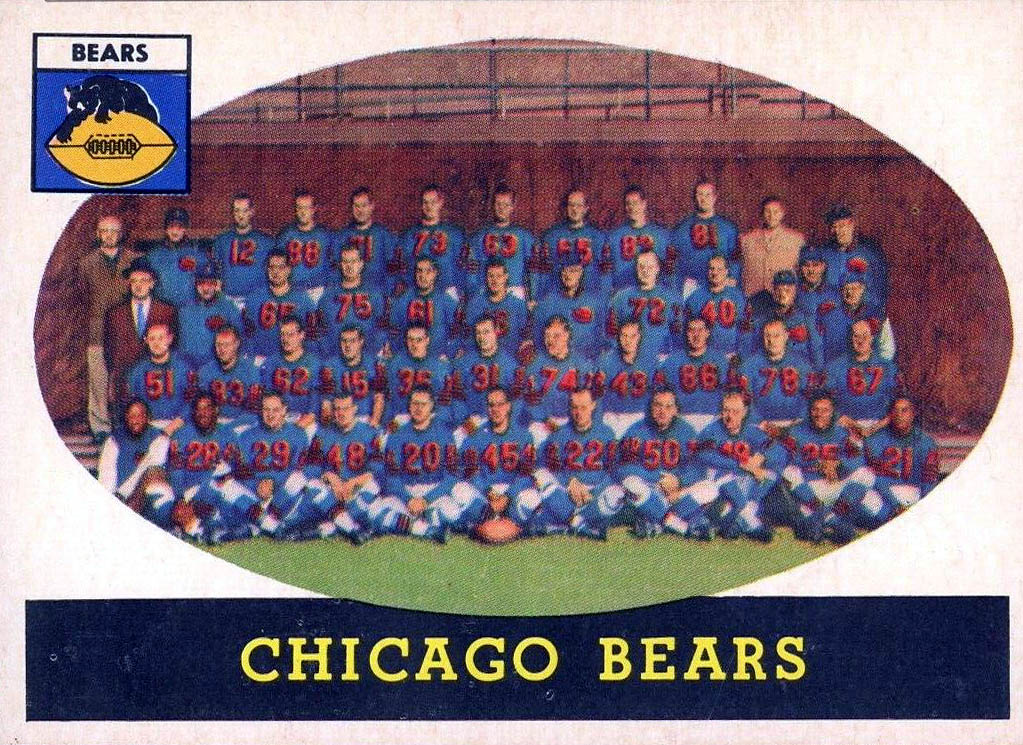
Chicago Bears team

Chicago Bears 1958 roster
Quarterbacks: 16 George Blanda K; 12 Zeke Bratkowski P; 15 Ed Brown P; 14 Rudy Bukich; Running backs: 25 J. C. Caroline; 35 Rick Casares; 36 Merrill Douglas; 28 Willie Galimore; 47 Johnny Morris; Receivers: 39 Ralph Anderson; 86 Bob Jewett; 83 Bill McColl; 45 Rocky Ryan	Offensive linemen: 67 Abe Gibron G; 60 Don Healy G; 78 Stan Jones T/G; 74 Bob Kilcullen G/T; 79 Dick Klein T; 70 Herman Lee T; 76 John Mellekas C; 55 Larry Strickland C; Defensive linemen: 81 Doug Atkins DE; 72 Bill Bishop DT; 51 Wayne Hansen DE/MLB; 71 Earl Leggett DT; 75 Fred Williams DT/DE	Linebackers: 31 Joe Fortunato OLB; 61 Bill George MLB; 54 Chuck Howley OLB; 69 Bill Roehnelt OLB; Defensive backs: 24 Erich Barnes CB; 49 Jack Johnson CB/P; 26 Charlie Sumner S; 40 Stan Wallace S; 48 Vic Zucco CB	Reserve: 85 Bob Carey WR (IR); 50 John Damore G/C (IR); 43 Jim Dooley WR (IR); 87 Harlon Hill WR (IR); 82 Jack Hoffman DE (IR); Rookies in italics
