= Million Dollar Backfield (San Francisco 49ers) =

1950s NFL offensive backfield

Million Dollar Backfield

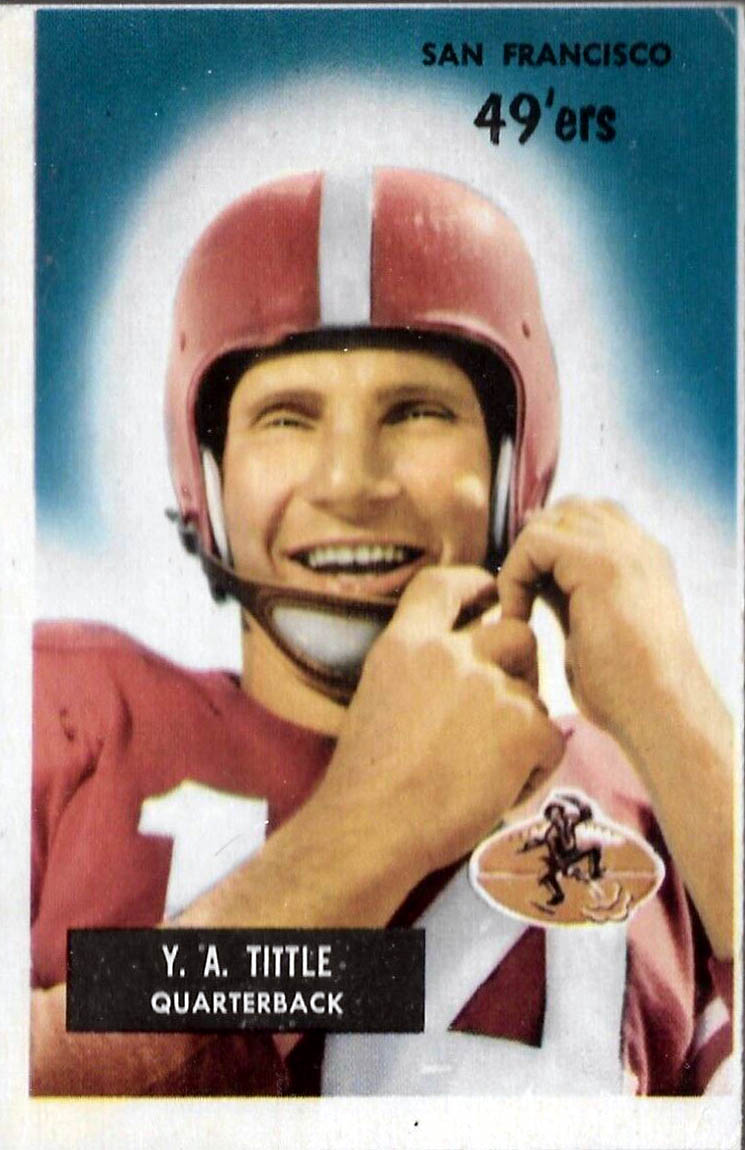
Y. A. Tittle

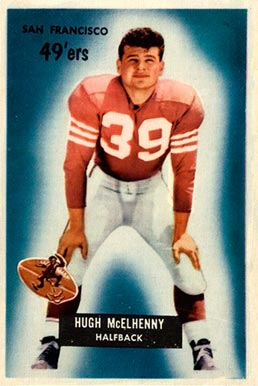
Hugh McElhenny
"The King"

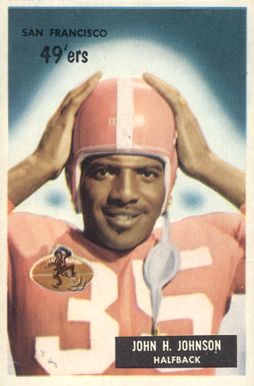
John Henry Johnson

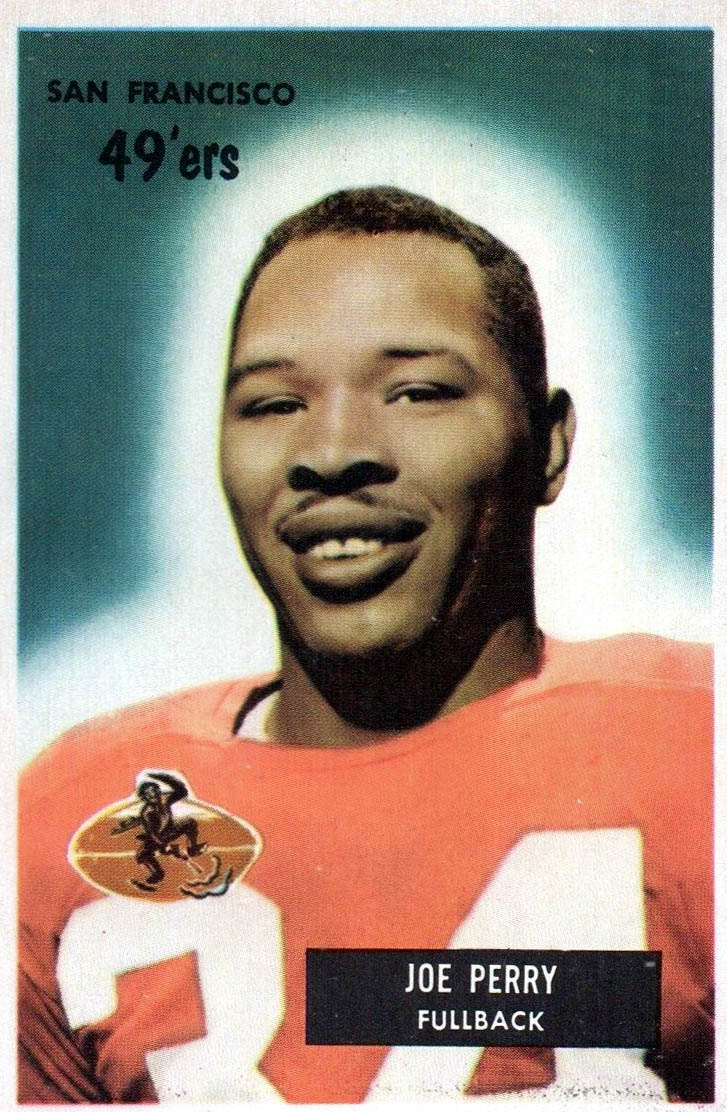
Joe Perry
"The Jet"

The Million Dollar Backfield was a National Football League (NFL) offensive backfield of the San Francisco 49ers from 1954 to 1956. Featuring quarterback Y. A. Tittle, halfbacks Hugh McElhenny and John Henry Johnson, and fullback Joe Perry, the backfield was also referred to as the "Fabulous Foursome" and "Fearsome Foursome" by sportswriters. Formed well before players earned six-figure salaries, the unit was named as such for its offensive prowess, and compiled record offensive statistics. It is regarded as one of the best backfields compiled in NFL history, and is the only full house backfield to have all four of its members enshrined in the Pro Football Hall of Fame.

== Line-up ==
Name	Position	Yrs with 49ers	HOF induction
Joe Perry	Fullback	1948–1960	1969
Y. A. Tittle	Quarterback	1951–1960	1971
Hugh McElhenny	Halfback	1952–1960	1970
John Henry Johnson	Halfback	1954–1956	1987

== History ==
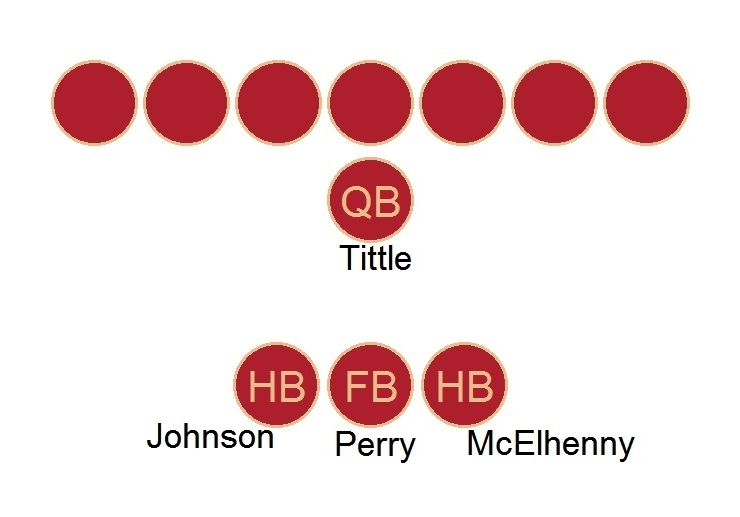
The backfield in the T formation

The 49ers in the 1950s used the T formation, sometimes referred to as a full house backfield, which deployed a quarterback, fullback, and two halfbacks. Such a formation was common at the time at both the college and professional levels, as teams sought to emulate the success the Chicago Bears had with the formation over the previous decade. The Million Dollar Backfield began its construction in 1948 with the team's signing of speedy fullback Joe Perry. In 1951 the 49ers drafted quarterback Y. A. Tittle. Tittle had played the previous three seasons with the Baltimore Colts, and became available in that year's draft after the Colts folded. The next year the 49ers drafted halfback Hugh McElhenny in the first round. McElhenny proved to be an explosive play-maker and was recognized as the NFL's rookie of the year in 1952. All three were invited to play in the Pro Bowl for 1953, comprising the starting offensive backfield for the West. The final piece came in 1954, when John Henry Johnson joined the team. Johnson became known for his powerful running and his blocking, which served to complement the finesse of Perry and McElhenny.

The "Million Dollar Backfield" moniker was first applied by 49ers public relations man Dan McGuire to describe the collective talent of the backfield. Despite the name, not even when combined did the players' salaries approach the million-dollar figure. In reality, at the time, players often took off-season jobs to supplement their income; Tittle launched his own insurance agency while with the 49ers, and McElhenny worked as a salesman for the Granny Goose potato chip company. Johnson, who never made more than $40,000 (~$470,000 in 2025 terms) in a season, joked in 1987 that he was "still looking for the million."

For three seasons, the backfield challenged opposing defenses with Tittle's arm, Johnson's power, the speed of Perry, and the elusiveness of McElhenny. "There was no greater running backs than Hugh McElhenny, John Henry Johnson and Joe Perry in the same backfield," Tittle reminisced. "It made quarterbacking so easy because I just get in the huddle and call anything and you have three Hall of Fame running backs ready to carry the ball." They achieved their greatest success during their first year together, in 1954, in which they shattered the team record for rushing yards in a season. The 49ers led the league with 2,498 rushing yards and 28 rushing touchdowns, and averaged 5.7 yards per carry and 208.2 rushing yards per game. Perry, McElhenny, and Johnson each finished the season in the top ten in rushing yards, with Perry and Johnson finishing first and second, respectively. McElhenny ranked eighth despite playing in only six games before being sidelined by a season-ending shoulder injury. Tittle, Perry, Johnson, and Detroit Lions halfback Doak Walker comprised the starting backfield in the 1955 Pro Bowl, and Perry was deemed the NFL's Player of the Year by the United Press. With the highly potent offense, many thought San Francisco was due to win an NFL championship, but defensive problems landed the 49ers in third place behind the Lions and Bears in 1954. Moreover, the offense struggled after McElhenny's injury.

Perry, taking advantage of Johnson's blocking, became the first NFL player to rush for 1,000 yards in consecutive seasons when he did so in 1954 and 1955. Writing for Jet magazine in 1955, sportswriter A. S. "Doc" Young called Perry "the bellwether of the greatest rushing backfield in pro football." McElhenny was a valuable asset in the passing game, becoming a favorite target of Tittle on screen passes. Tittle's 17 touchdown passes in 1955 led the league. In 1956, McElhenny became the team's leading ball carrier, recording career-highs with 185 carries for 916 yards and eight touchdowns. As the 49ers' defensive struggles continued, Johnson was traded to Detroit after the 1956 season in exchange for a defensive back, effectively disbanding the Million Dollar Backfield. The backfield of Tittle, Perry, and McElhenny remained intact through the 1960 season. The nearest the 49ers came to a championship in the 1950s was in 1957, when the team finished with an 8–4 record and was defeated by the Lions in that year's Western Conference playoff.

== Legacy ==
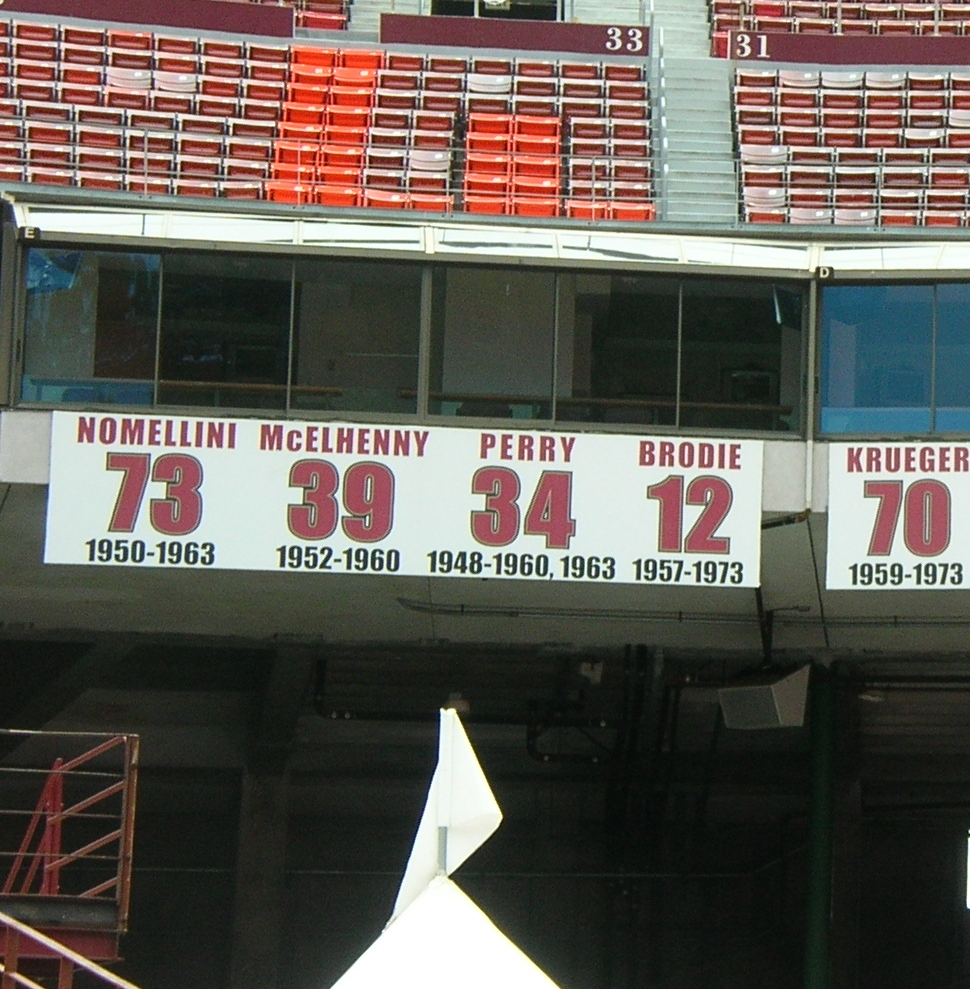
McElhenny's No. 39 and Perry's No. 34 displayed in Candlestick Park

The 49ers' Million Dollar Backfield is regarded as one of the best backfields in NFL history, and is the only full-house backfield to have all four of its members enshrined in the Pro Football Hall of Fame. By virtue of their memberships in the pro hall of fame, all four were automatically inducted as charter members of the San Francisco 49ers Hall of Fame in 2009. Longtime 49ers coach Bill Walsh co-authored a book about the backfield in 2000 entitled The Million Dollar Backfield: The San Francisco 49ers in the 1950s. In 2014, a sculpture comprising the four players, crouched over as if in a huddle, was erected in Levi's Stadium.

Tittle played for the 49ers until 1960, after which he was traded to the New York Giants, with whom he had the most successful years of his career; he was named AP NFL MVP in 1963, led the team to three straight NFL championship games, and broke several passing records. Consequently, the trade of Tittle for guard Lou Cordileone is seen as one of the worst trades in 49ers franchise history. Tittle retired as the NFL's all-time leader in passing yards, passing touchdowns, completions, attempts, total offense, and games played. He was inducted into the Pro Football Hall of Fame in 1971.

McElhenny made five Pro Bowl appearances with the 49ers before being released by the team in 1960. He was then picked in the 1961 expansion draft by the Minnesota Vikings, with whom he made his final Pro Bowl appearance. He played for the Vikings for two seasons, then reunited with Tittle on the Giants in 1963, and played his final season in 1964 with the Detroit Lions. A member of the NFL's 1950s All-Decade Team, McElhenny retired having amassed the third most all-purpose yards of any player in NFL history. The 49ers retired his No. 39 jersey, and he was elected to the Pro Football Hall of Fame in 1970.

Johnson played only three seasons with the 49ers. Like Tittle, Johnson had a late-blooming career; his most productive years came with the Pittsburgh Steelers, well after his time in San Francisco. He remains the second oldest player to rush for 1,000 yards in a single season, when he did so in 1964 at age 35. He retired in 1966 with the third most career rushing yards in the NFL. Johnson's induction into the Pro Football Hall of Fame came in 1987, and was an honor that contemporaries felt was fifteen years overdue.

Perry was with San Francisco for fourteen of his sixteen seasons as a pro, during which he became one of the first black stars in American football. Despite sharing carries with McElhenny and Johnson, Perry's greatest individual success came while playing in the Million Dollar Backfield. After a brief stint with the Baltimore Colts, Perry returned to the 49ers in 1963 for his final season, and he retired as the NFL's all-time leading rusher. He was inducted into the Pro Football Hall of Fame in 1969, his first year of eligibility, and the 49ers retired his No. 34 jersey in 1971.

On June 9, 2011, it was announced that Johnson and Perry, who died within months of each other, would have their brains examined by researchers at Boston University who are studying head injuries in sports. Both men were suspected of suffering from chronic traumatic encephalopathy (CTE), a disorder linked to repeated brain trauma.

== See also ==
- History of the San Francisco 49ers
- Million Dollar Backfield (Chicago Cardinals)
- Four Horsemen (American football)
