= 1958 Los Angeles Rams season =

NFL team season

- Head coach: Sid Gillman
- Home stadium: Los Angeles Memorial Coliseum

Results
- Record: 8–4
- Division place: T-2nd NFL Western
- Playoffs: Did not qualify

Uniform
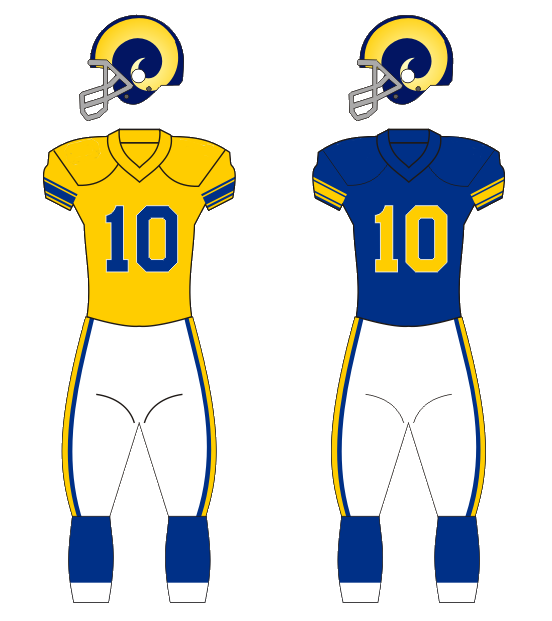

The 1958 Los Angeles Rams season was the team's 21st year with the National Football League and the 13th season in Los Angeles.

== Schedule ==
Week	Date	Opponent	Result	Record	Venue	Attendance
1	September 28	Cleveland Browns	**L** 27–30	0–1	Los Angeles Memorial Coliseum	69,993
2	October 5	at **San Francisco 49ers**	**W** 33–3	1–1	Kezar Stadium	73,164
3	October 12	at **Detroit Lions**	**W** 42–28	2–1	Briggs Stadium	41,021
4	October 19	at **Chicago Bears**	**L** 10–31	2–2	Wrigley Field	41,387
5	October 26	**Detroit Lions**	**L** 24–41	2–3	Los Angeles Memorial Coliseum	81,703
6	November 2	**Chicago Bears**	**W** 41–35	3–3	Los Angeles Memorial Coliseum	100,740
7	November 9	**San Francisco 49ers**	**W** 56–7	4–3	Los Angeles Memorial Coliseum	95,082
8	November 16	at **Green Bay Packers**	**W** 20–7	5–3	City Stadium	28,051
9	November 23	at **Baltimore Colts**	**L** 7–34	5–4	Memorial Stadium	57,557
10	November 30	at Chicago Cardinals	**W** 20–14	6–4	Comiskey Park	13,041
11	December 6	**Baltimore Colts**	**W** 30–28	7–4	Los Angeles Memorial Coliseum	100,202
12	December 14	**Green Bay Packers**	**W** 34–20	8–4	Los Angeles Memorial Coliseum	54,634
Note: Intra-conference opponents are in **bold** text.

== Final roster ==
1958 Los Angeles Rams roster
Quarterbacks (QB): 15 Frank Ryan; 9 Bill Wade; Running backs (RB): 26 Jon Arnett; 34 Joe Marconi; 27 Ron Waller; 24 Tommy Wilson; Wide receivers (WR): 84 Leon Clarke; 85 Lamar Lundy; 82 Jim Phillips; 29 Del Shofner P; Tight ends (TE)	Offensive linemen (OL): 79 Charlie Bradshaw T; 75 Bob Fry T; 62 John Houser G/C; 63 Buck Lansford G; 51 John Morrow C; 73 Ken Panfil T; 61 Duane Putnam G; Defensive linemen (DL): 74 John Baker DT; 71 Frank Fuller DT; 89 Glenn Holtzman DE; 55 Lou Michaels DE; 77 George Strugar DT; 78 Roy Wilkins DE/MLB	Linebackers (LB): 50 Dick Daugherty OLB; 57 Bill Jobko OLB; 37 Jim Jones OLB; 32 Jack Pardee OLB; 48 Les Richter MLB; Defensive backs (DB): 47 Fred Bruney S; 25 Don Burroughs S; 44 Jimmy Harris CB; 40 Jack Morris CB; 43 Will Sherman S; 46 Clendon Thomas S/CB; Special teams (ST): 36 Paige Cothren K	Reserve: 21 Alex Bravo CB/S (IR); -- Roy Hord G (Military); 81 Paul Miller DE (IR); 31 Larry Morris LB (IR); -- Darryl Rogers WR (Military); Rookies in italics

=== Season summary ===
==== Week 6 ====
Team	1	2	3	4	Total
Bears	7	7	7	14	35
• Rams	17	14	10	0	41

- Date: November 2
- Location: Los Angeles Memorial Coliseum
- Game attendance: 100,470

Scoring summary
Q1	CHI	Barnes 20 yard interception return (Blanda kick)	CHI 7–0
Q1	LA	Wade 3 yard run (Cothren kick)	Tie 7–7
Q1	LA	Cothren 19 yard field goal	LA 10–7
Q1	LA	Wilson 9 yard run (Cothren kick)	LA 17–7
Q2	LA	Clarke 5 yard pass from Wade (Cothren kick)	LA 24–7
Q2	LA	Wilson 38 yard pass from Wade (Cothren kick)	LA 31–7
Q2	CHI	McColl 10 yard pass from Bratkowski (Blanda kick)	LA 31–14
Q3	CHI	Galimore 12 yard pass from Bratkowski (Blanda kick)	LA 31–21
Q3	LA	Wilson 3 yard run (Cothren kick)	LA 38–21
Q3	LA	Cothren 22 yard field goal	LA 41–21
Q4	CHI	Casares 5 yard run (Blanda kick)	LA 41–28
Q4	CHI	McColl 25 yard pass from Bratkowski (Blanda kick)	LA 41–35

=== Standings ===
NFL Western Conference
	W	L	T	PCT	CONF	PF	PA	STK
Baltimore Colts	9	3	0	.750	8–2	381	203	L2
Los Angeles Rams	8	4	0	.667	7–3	344	278	W3
Chicago Bears	8	4	0	.667	7–3	298	230	W2
San Francisco 49ers	6	6	0	.500	4–6	257	324	W2
Detroit Lions	4	7	1	.364	3–6–1	261	276	L2
Green Bay Packers	1	10	1	.091	0–9–1	193	382	L7

Note: Tie games were not officially counted in the standings until 1972.
