= Paul Winslow =

Paul Winslow may refer to:

- Paul Winslow (cricketer) (1929–2011), South African cricketer
- Paul Winslow (American football) (born 1938), former defensive back in the National Football League
