= Frank Youso =

American football player (1936–2022)

No. 72, 78
- Positions: Offensive tackle, defensive tackle

Personal information
- Born: July 5, 1936; International Falls, Minnesota, U.S.
- Died: October 8, 2022 (aged 86); International Falls, Minnesota, U.S.
- Listed height: 6 ft 4 in (1.93 m)
- Listed weight: 257 lb (117 kg)

Career information
- High school: Falls (MN)
- College: Minnesota
- NFL draft: 1958: 2nd round, 23rd overall pick

Career history
- New York Giants (1958–1960); Minnesota Vikings (1961–1962); Oakland Raiders (1963-1965)

Awards and highlights
- Second-team All-Big Ten (1956)

Career NFL/AFL statistics
- Games played: 92
- Games started: 80
- Fumble recoveries: 1
- Stats at Pro Football Reference

Frank Michael Youso (July 5, 1936 – October 8, 2022) was an American professional football player who was an offensive tackle. He played college football for the Minnesota Golden Gophers and professionally for the New York Giants and Minnesota Vikings of the National Football League (NFL) and for the Oakland Raiders of the American Football League (AFL).

== Career ==
Youso attended Falls High School in International Falls, Minnesota, graduating in 1954. He enrolled at the University of Minnesota and played college football for the Minnesota Golden Gophers football team as an offensive tackle and defensive tackle. He was named an All-American with Minnesota, and played in the Blue–Gray Football Classic and the Senior Bowl.

The New York Giants of the National Football League (NFL) selected Youso 23rd overall in the second round of the 1958 NFL draft. He played for three seasons with the Giants as an offensive tackle, and he played as a defensive tackle during the 1958 NFL Championship Game due to an injury to Roosevelt Grier. The Minnesota Vikings selected Youso in the 1961 NFL expansion draft. In 1963, the Vikings shifted Youso to play as a defensive tackle. However, the Vikings cut Youso before the start of the 1963 season. Youso signed with the Oakland Raiders of the American Football League as an offensive tackle before the start of the 1963 season. Youso missed three weeks of the 1965 season due to a synovial bursa and missed about half of the 1965 season after suffering a knee injury. Youso retired before the 1966 season.

== Personal life and death ==
Youso's family moved from Minnesota to Seattle, Washington, when he was young. He developed asthma and pneumonia, which resolved when the family moved back to Minnesota.

Youso married Evelyn (née Pelland) on November 30, 1957. Youso's grandson, Jake, is a hockey player.

After his football career, Youso lived in International Falls, where he operated a motel and vacation lodge. Youso signed on to a class action lawsuit against the NFL filed by retired players relating to brain injuries suffered while playing. The NFL settled the lawsuit.

Youso died on October 8, 2022, at age 86.

== See also ==
- List of American Football League players
