= 1959 All-Big Ten Conference football team =

American college football all-star team

The 1959 All-Big Ten Conference football team consists of American football players chosen by various organizations for All-Big Ten Conference teams for the 1959 Big Ten Conference football season.

== All-Big Ten selections ==
=== Quarterbacks ===
- Dean Look, Michigan State (AP-1; UPI-2)
- Dale Hackbart, Wisconsin (AP-2; UPI-1)
- Olen Treadway, Iowa (AP-3; UPI-3)

=== Halfbacks ===
- Bob Jeter, Iowa (AP-1; UPI-1)
- Ron Burton, Northwestern (AP-1; UPI-1)
- Ray Jauch, Iowa (AP-2; UPI-2)
- Ray Purdin, Northwestern (AP-2; UPI-2)
- Herb Adderly, Michigan State (AP-3; UPI-3)
- Bob Jarus, Purdue (UPI-3)
- Vic Jones, Indiana (AP-3)

=== Fullbacks ===
- Mike Stock, Northwestern (AP-1; UPI-1)
- Bill Brown, Illinois (AP-2; UPI-2)
- Bob White, Ohio State (AP-3; UPI-3)

=== Ends ===
- Jim Houston, Ohio State (AP-1; UPI-1)
- Don Norton, Iowa (AP-1; UPI-1)
- Elbert Kimbrough, Northwestern (AP-2; UPI-2)
- Earl Faison, Indiana (AP-3; UPI-2)
- Ted Aucreman, Indiana (AP-2; UPI-3)
- Dick Brooks, Purdue (AP-3; UPI-3)

=== Tackles ===
- Dan Lanphear, Wisconsin (AP-1; UPI-1)
- Joe Rutgens, Illinois (AP-1; UPI-2)
- Gene Gossage, Northwestern (AP-2; UPI-1)
- Jerry Beabout, Purdue (UPI-2)
- Jim Heineke, Wisconsin (AP-2; UPI-3)
- Mike Wright, Minnesota (UPI-3)
- Palmer Pyle, Michigan State (AP-3)
- Jim Tyrer, Ohio State (AP-3)

=== Guards ===
- Jerry Stalcup, Wisconsin (AP-1; UPI-1)
- Bill Burrell, Illinois (AP-1; UPI-1)
- Tom Brown, Minnesota (AP-3; UPI-2)
- Ron Maltony, Purdue (AP-2; UPI-2)
- Ron Perkins, Wisconsin (AP-2)
- Pete Arena, Northwestern (AP-3; UPI-3)
- Ernie Wright, Ohio State (UPI-3)

=== Centers ===
- Jim Andreotti, Northwestern (AP-1; UPI-1)
- Bill Lapham, Iowa (AP-2; UPI-2)
- Dave Manders, Michigan State (UPI-3)
- Jerry Smith, Michigan (AP-3)

== Key ==
AP = Associated Press

UPI = United Press International, selected by the conference coaches

Bold = Consensus first-team selections by the AP and UPI

== See also ==
- 1959 College Football All-America Team
