= Dave Middleton =

American football player (1933–2007)

No. 28, 84
- Positions: End, wide receiver, halfback

Personal information
- Born: November 23, 1933; Birmingham, Alabama, U.S.
- Died: December 29, 2007 (aged 74); Ann Arbor, Michigan, U.S.
- Listed height: 6 ft 1 in (1.85 m)
- Listed weight: 194 lb (88 kg)

Career information
- High school: Ensley (Birmingham)
- College: Auburn (1951–1954)
- NFL draft: 1955: 1st round, 12th overall pick

Career history
- Detroit Lions (1955–1960); Minnesota Vikings (1961)

Awards and highlights
- NFL champion (1957)

Career NFL statistics
- Receptions: 183
- Receiving yards: 2,966
- Receiving touchdowns: 17
- Stats at Pro Football Reference

David Hinton Middleton (November 23, 1933 – December 29, 2007) was an American professional football end, wide receiver, and halfback.

A native of Birmingham, Alabama, Middleton played college football as a halfback for the Auburn Tigers in 1953 and 1954. He was also the 1955 Southeastern Conference champion in the 100-yard dash.

He was selected by the Detroit Lions in the first round of the 1955 NFL draft and played for the Lions in the National Football League (NFL) from 1955 to 1960. As a rookie, he ranked third in the NFL with 44 receptions, and he was the Lions' leading receiver in 1955, 1956, and 1958. He won an NFL championship with the Lions in 1957 and caught a touchdown pass in the 1957 NFL Championship Game. He concluded his NFL career with the Minnesota Vikings in their inaugural season of 1961. In seven NFL seasons, he totaled 183 receptions, 2,966 receiving yards, and 19 touchdowns.

Middleton attended medical school while playing for the Lions and had a career as an obstetrician-gynecologist after his football career ended.

== Early life ==
Middleton was born in Birmingham, Alabama, in 1933 and attended Ensley High School. He attended Auburn University, where he played college football as a halfback for the Auburn Tigers football team. In 1954, he rushed for 482 yards and 158 receiving yards and scored five touchdowns. In 1955, he was also the Southeastern Conference champion in the 100-yard dash, an event in which he was time at 9.6 seconds.

== Professional football ==
=== Detroit Lions ===
Middleton was drafted by the Detroit Lions in the first round (12th overall pick) of the 1955 NFL draft, and agreed to terms with the Lions during a February 1955 meeting with head coach Buddy Parker. He remained with the Lions for six seasons from 1955 through 1960. He was the Lions' leading receiver in 1955 (44 receptions for 663 yards), 1956 (39 receptions for 606 yards), and 1958 (29 receptions for 506 yards).

As a rookie in 1955, he played at the halfback position for five games before being switched to the offensive end position. Despite playing only half the season as an end, he quickly became quarterback Bobby Layne's favorite target and ranked among the NFL's 1955 leaders with 44 receptions (third), 1,058 all-purpose yards (sixth), 663 receiving yards (sixth), 55.3 receiving yards per game (sixth), and 9.3 yards per touch (sixth).

After the 1955 season, Middleton enrolled in medical school at the University of Tennessee Medical School in Memphis. As his classes ran into late September, he negotiated a contract with the Lions that permitted him to miss training camp and join the team just prior to the start of the regular season on September 30. Despite missing training camp, Middleton again ranked among the NFL leaders in 1956 with 39 receptions (sixth), 606 receiving yards (sixth), and 50.5 receiving yards per game (seventh).

In 1957, Middleton helped the Lions win the NFL championship, making a diving catch in the end zone on 28-yard touchdown pass from Tobin Rote in the 1957 NFL Championship Game. In 1959, he had a career-long, 79-yard reception on a pass from Earl Morrall.

During his career with the Lions, Middleton played his best games against the Chicago Bears: 8 catches for 168 yards and a touchdown on November 20, 1955; 7 catches for 146 yards and two touchdowns on December 2, 1956; 7 catches for 87 yards and a touchdown on December 15, 1957; and 5 catches for 144 yards and a touchdown in 1958.

Middleton continued his medical school education while playing for the Lions, attending school from January through September and missing training camp. Middleton acknowledged that missing training camp impacted his playing career. Lions coach George Wilson agreed: "If he had given himself a chance, Doc would be among the all-time greats. As it is, he's plenty good."

=== Minnesota Vikings ===
In January 1961, Middleton announced that he was retiring from football to begin his medical career. In August 1961, he took a leave of absence from the University of Michigan Hospital to play a final season in the NFL, this time with the Minnesota Vikings. The Vikings, in their inaugural season, had acquired the rights to Middleton in a special draft in late January. He appeared in 12 games as a wide receiver for the 1961 Vikings. The Vikings had rookie Fran Tarkenton as their quarterback, and Middleton was the team's second leading receiver with 30 catches for 444 yards. Middleton again announced his retirement from the NFL in July 1962.

== NFL career statistics ==
Legend
	Won the NFL championship
**Bold**	Career high

=== Regular season ===
Year	Team	Games		Receiving				
Year	Team	GP	GS	Rec	Yds	Avg	Lng	TD
1955	DET	12	11	**44**	**663**	15.1	77	3
1956	DET	12	10	39	606	15.5	56	**5**
1957	DET	8	5	18	294	16.3	56	2
1958	DET	12	11	29	506	17.4	46	3
1959	DET	12	10	18	402	**22.3**	**79**	2
1960	DET	7	1	5	51	10.2	20	0
1961	MIN	12	12	30	444	14.8	57	2
Career		75	60	183	2,966	16.2	79	17

=== Playoffs ===
Year	Team	Games		Receiving				
Year	Team	GP	GS	Rec	Yds	Avg	Lng	TD
1957	DET	2	1	3	59	19.7	32	1
Career		2	1	3	59	19.7	32	1

== Family and later years ==
Middleton was married in 1958 to Jeanette Rousseau at Paint Rock, Alabama. They had three children, Clark, Eric, and Beth.

After retiring from the NFL, Middleton practiced as an obstetrician-gynecologist in Ann Arbor, Michigan. In 1997, he suffered a stroke, and in 2001, he moved to Huron Woods, an assisted living facility in Ann Arbor. On Christmas Eve 2007, Middleton fell and suffered a head injury, which led to his death five days later.
