= Jerry Reichow =

American football player (born 1934)

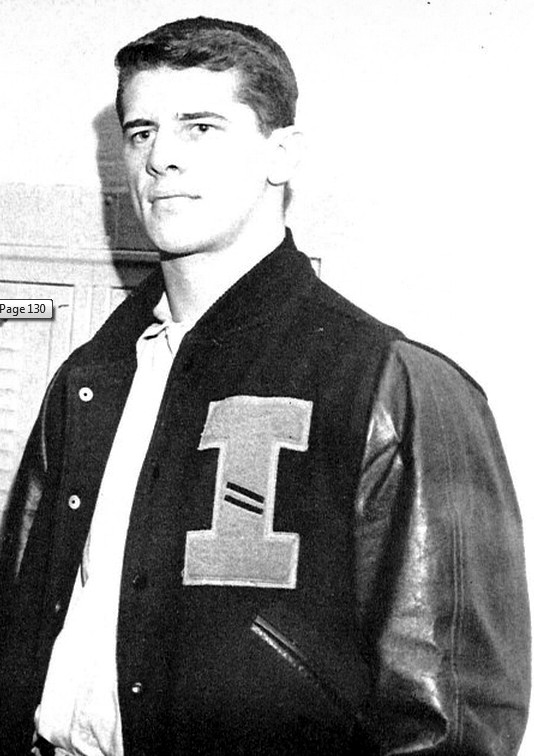

No. 15, 80, 87, 17, 89
- Positions: End, quarterback

Personal information
- Born: May 19, 1934 (age 92); Decorah, Iowa, U.S.
- Listed height: 6 ft 2 in (1.88 m)
- Listed weight: 217 lb (98 kg)

Career information
- High school: Decorah
- College: Iowa
- NFL draft: 1956: 4th round, 38th overall pick

Career history
- Detroit Lions (1956–1959); Philadelphia Eagles (1960); Minnesota Vikings (1961–1964)

Awards and highlights
- 2× NFL champion (1957, 1960); Pro Bowl (1961)

Career NFL statistics
- Receptions: 172
- Receiving yards: 2,579
- Touchdowns: 24
- Passing yards: 187
- TD-INT: 0-4
- Passer rating: 9.3
- Stats at Pro Football Reference

Garet Neal Reichow (born May 19, 1934) is an American former professional football player who was a tight end in the National Football League (NFL). A 6 ft 3 in (1.91 m) college football player for the Iowa Hawkeyes, Reichow was selected by the Detroit Lions in the fourth round of the 1956 NFL draft with the 38th overall pick. He was one of two Minnesota Vikings (along with Hugh McElhenny) selected to the Pro Bowl after their inaugural 1961 season.

An All-Big Ten quarterback, Reichow starred at the University of Iowa. He was the football team's MVP as a senior and left school as its all-time leader in total offense. The Detroit Lions took notice and selected Reichow, who also played in the 1955 basketball Final Four for Iowa, in the fourth round. Reichow contributed to the Lions’ 1957 NFL title as a receiver and back-up quarterback for Tobin Rote, who replaced the injured Bobby Layne as starting quarterback. Reichow saw relief duty at quarterback in the 1957 NFL Championship Game, when Rote left the game with the Lions leading, 52–14. He threw a 17-yard touchdown pass to Heisman Trophy winner Hopalong Cassady and the game finished 59–14. Three years later, Reichow was a member of the Eagles’ 1960 championship club.

On July 24, 1960, (Walt Kowalczyk) was traded to the Detroit Lions in exchange for Reichow.

Reichow joined former teammate Norm Van Brocklin, who became the Minnesota Vikings first head coach where he was key to quarterback Fran Tarkenton’s success in 1961. Reichow played wide receiver and proved to be the rookie’s favorite target, catching 50 passes for 859 yards and 11 touchdowns. (Reichow’s 11 touchdown receptions stood 34 years as a single-season team record until broken by Cris Carter in 1995.)

No. 89 followed his Pro Bowl season with 39 receptions before moving to tight end his final years in purple. Reichow caught a combined 55 passes from his new position in 1963–64.

At the age of 31, and with the team stockpiling young receivers, Reichow's playing career ended when Van Brocklin cut him during the 1965 training camp and gave him a job scouting for the club.

Reichow played a role in the Vikings’ personnel decisions over several decades. The former wide receiver and tight end has served in a variety of personnel roles during his five decades with the franchise. From scout to Director of Player Personnel to Director of Football Operations to Assistant General Manager for National Scouting to his current consultant role, which he assumed a few years ago, Reichow is one of the longest-serving employees in the NFL, entering the personnel department in 1965. Jerry Reichow currently resides in Santa Fe, New Mexico, with his wife Carolyn Reichow.
