= Byron Beams =

American football player (1935–1992)

No. 72, 78
- Positions: Offensive tackle, defensive tackle

Personal information
- Born: September 8, 1935; Konawa, Oklahoma, U.S.
- Died: November 14, 1992 (aged 63); Brown County, Wisconsin, U.S.
- Listed height: 6 ft 6 in (1.98 m)
- Listed weight: 248 lb (112 kg)

Career information
- High school: Ada (Ada, Oklahoma)
- College: Notre Dame
- NFL draft: 1957: 20th round, 232nd overall pick
- Expansion draft: 1961: 1st round, 3rd overall pick

Career history
- Pittsburgh Steelers (1959–1960); Houston Oilers (1961); San Diego Chargers (1962)*
- * Offseason or practice squad member only

Awards and highlights
- AFL champion (1961)

Career NFL/AFL statistics
- Games played: 17
- Games started: 2
- Stats at Pro Football Reference

Byron Donnell Beams (September 8, 1935 – November 14, 1992) was an American football offensive tackle and defensive tackle who played in the National Football League (NFL) and the American Football League (AFL). He played college football for the Notre Dame Fighting Irish. Beams was selected by the Los Angeles Rams in the 20th round of the 1957 NFL draft. He played for the Pittsburgh Steelers from 1959 to 1960, and in the AFL for the Houston Oilers in 1961.

== See also ==
- List of American Football League players
