= Ken Petersen =

American football player (born 1939)

No. 66, 42, 60
- Position: Guard

Personal information
- Born: March 26, 1939 (age 87); Logan, Utah, U.S.
- Listed height: 6 ft 2 in (1.88 m)
- Listed weight: 235 lb (107 kg)

Career information
- High school: South (Salt Lake City, Utah)
- College: Utah
- NFL draft: 1961: 14th round, 183rd overall pick
- AFL draft: 1961: 10th round, 74th overall pick

Career history
- Minnesota Vikings (1961); Edmonton Eskimos (1963–1964)

Career NFL statistics
- Games played: 12
- Games started: 1
- Fumble recoveries: 1
- Stats at Pro Football Reference

Thornton Kenneth Petersen (born March 26, 1939) is an American former professional football player who was a guard with the Minnesota Vikings of the National Football League (NFL). He played college football for the Utah Utes.
