= Ray Hayes =

American football player (1935–1987)

No. 32
- Position: Fullback

Personal information
- Born: February 25, 1935; Pawhuska, Oklahoma, U.S.
- Died: February 17, 1987 (aged 51)
- Listed height: 6 ft 3 in (1.91 m)
- Listed weight: 235 lb (107 kg)

Career information
- High school: Frederick Douglass (OK)
- College: Maryland State; Central State (OK)
- NFL draft: 1961: 13th round, 169th overall pick

Career history
- Minnesota Vikings (1961)

Career NFL statistics
- Rushing yards: 319
- Rush attempts: 73
- Rushing TDs: 2
- Receptions: 12
- Receiving yards: 121
- Games played: 13
- Stats at Pro Football Reference

Raymond "Ray" Hayes (February 25, 1935 – February 17, 1987) was an American professional football fullback who played for one season for the Minnesota Vikings of the National Football League (NFL). He played college football for the Maryland State Hawks and the Central State Bronchos.
