= Tom Barnett (American football) =

American football player (born 1937)

No. 43, 89
- Position: Halfback

Personal information
- Born: July 11, 1937 (age 89); Alliance, Ohio, U.S.
- Listed height: 5 ft 11 in (1.80 m)
- Listed weight: 190 lb (86 kg)

Career information
- High school: Alliance
- College: Purdue
- NFL draft: 1959: 8th round, 91st overall pick
- Expansion draft: 1961: 1st round, 2nd overall pick

Career history
- Pittsburgh Steelers (1959–1960); Minnesota Vikings (1961)*; Saskatchewan Roughriders (1962)
- * Offseason or practice squad member only

Career NFL statistics
- Rushing yards: 263
- Rushing average: 3.2
- Rushing touchdowns: 1
- Receptions: 7
- Receiving yards: 52
- Receiving touchdowns: 1
- Stats at Pro Football Reference

Thomas George Barnett (born July 11, 1937) is an American former professional football player who was a halfback in the National Football League (NFL). He played college football for the Purdue Boilermakers.
