= Jerry Stalcup =

American football player (1938–2025)

No. 60, 62
- Position: Linebacker

Personal information
- Born: November 19, 1938; Rockford, Illinois, U.S.
- Died: October 19, 2025 (aged 86); Rockford, Illinois, U.S.
- Listed height: 6 ft 1 in (1.85 m)
- Listed weight: 240 lb (109 kg)

Career information
- High school: Rockford East
- College: Wisconsin
- NFL draft: 1960: 6th round, 62nd overall pick
- AFL draft: 1960: 1st round

Career history
- Los Angeles Rams (1960); Denver Broncos (1961–1962)

Awards and highlights
- 2× Second-team All-American (1958, 1959); 2× First-team All-Big Ten (1958, 1959)

Career NFL/AFL statistics
- Interceptions: 1
- Sacks: 3
- Stats at Pro Football Reference

Jerry Newell Stalcup (November 19, 1938 – October 19, 2025) was an American professional football player who was a linebacker in the National Football League (NFL) and American Football League (AFL). He played college football for the Wisconsin Badgers. Stalcup was selected in the sixth round of the 1960 NFL draft by the Los Angeles Rams and played that season with the team. He was later drafted in the 1961 NFL expansion draft by the Minnesota Vikings, but instead went on to play two seasons with the Denver Broncos in the AFL. In 1965, he returned to his high school in Rockford to serve as the defensive coordinator. In 1974, he and head Coach Robert Pellant led Rockford East to a state championship in the first year the high school football playoffs were held in Illinois.

Stalcup died on October 19, 2025, at the age of 86.
