= A. D. Williams =

American football player (born 1933)

No. 81, 83, 82
- Position: End

Personal information
- Born: November 21, 1933; Little Rock, Arkansas, U.S.
- Died: February 25, 1990 (aged 56); Los Angeles County, California, U.S.
- Listed height: 6 ft 2 in (1.88 m)
- Listed weight: 210 lb (95 kg)

Career information
- High school: Santa Monica (Santa Monica, California)
- College: Pacific
- NFL draft: 1956: 3rd round, 32nd overall pick

Career history
- Green Bay Packers (1959); Cleveland Browns (1960); Minnesota Vikings (1961); Toronto Argonauts (1962–1963)

Awards and highlights
- First-team All-PCC (1955)

Career NFL statistics
- Receptions: 15
- Receiving yards: 190
- Touchdowns: 1
- Stats at Pro Football Reference

A. D. Williams (November 21, 1933 – March 25, 1990) was an American professional football end in the National Football League (NFL) who played for the Green Bay Packers, the Cleveland Browns, and the Minnesota Vikings. Williams was drafted in the third round of the 1956 NFL draft out of University of the Pacific. He played for three years in the NFL, and retired in 1961.
