= Hugh McElhenny =

American football player (1928–2022)

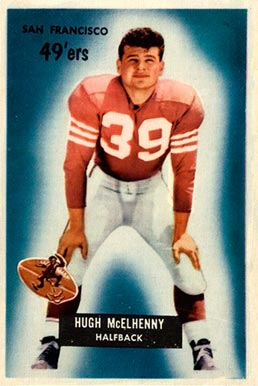
- McElhenny in 1955

No. 39
- Positions: Halfback, return specialist

Personal information
- Born: December 31, 1928; Los Angeles, California, U.S.
- Died: June 17, 2022 (aged 93); Henderson, Nevada, U.S.
- Listed height: 6 ft 1 in (1.85 m)
- Listed weight: 195 lb (88 kg)

Career information
- High school: Washington (Los Angeles)
- College: Compton (1948); Washington (1949–1951)
- NFL draft: 1952: 1st round, 9th overall pick

Career history
- San Francisco 49ers (1952–1960); Minnesota Vikings (1961–1962); New York Giants (1963); Detroit Lions (1964)

Awards and highlights
- 5× First-team All-Pro (1952–1954, 1956, 1957); 6× Pro Bowl (1952, 1953, 1956–1958, 1961); NFL 1950s All-Decade Team; San Francisco 49ers Hall of Fame; San Francisco 49ers No. 39 retired; First-team All-American (1951); 2× First-team All-PCC (1950, 1951)

Career NFL statistics
- Rushing yards: 5,281
- Rushing average: 4.7
- Rushing touchdowns: 38
- Receptions: 264
- Receiving yards: 3,247
- Receiving touchdowns: 20
- Return yards: 2,841
- Return touchdowns: 2
- Stats at Pro Football Reference
- Pro Football Hall of Fame
- College Football Hall of Fame

Hugh Edward McElhenny Jr. (December 31, 1928 – June 17, 2022) was an American professional football player who was a halfback in the National Football League (NFL) from 1952 to 1964 for the San Francisco 49ers, Minnesota Vikings, New York Giants, and Detroit Lions. He was noted for his explosive, elusive running style and was nicknamed "the King" and "Hurryin' Hugh". A member of San Francisco's famed Million Dollar Backfield and one of the franchise's most popular players, McElhenny's no. 39 is retired by the 49ers and he is a member of the San Francisco 49ers Hall of Fame.

McElhenny first rose to stardom as a standout all-around player for Compton Junior College in 1948. He then transferred to the University of Washington, where he was a two-time All-Pacific Coast Conference at fullback for the Washington Huskies football team and set several school and conference records. He was selected by the 49ers with the ninth pick in the 1952 NFL draft, and his versatility made him an immediate star in the league, earning him five first-team All-Pro honors in his first six seasons. With the 49ers, he was selected for five Pro Bowls, and he earned his sixth Pro Bowl appearance with the Vikings. He finished his career after short stints with the Giants and Lions.

An all-around player who was a threat as a runner and a receiver and also return specialist, McElhenny had amassed the third-most all-purpose yards of any player in NFL history when he retired. He was inducted into the Pro Football Hall of Fame in 1970 and the College Football Hall of Fame in 1981. According to the Pro Football Hall of Fame, "Hugh McElhenny was to pro football in the 1950s and early 1960s what Elvis Presley was to rock and roll", a reference to both his popularity and his nickname.

== Early life ==
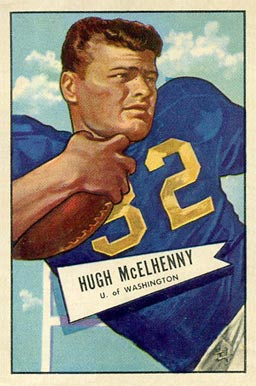
McElhenny depicted with University of Washington

Born on December 31, 1928 and raised in Los Angeles, California, Hugh McElhenny attended its George Washington High School, where he set state high school records in the high and low hurdles and broad jump, and ran the 100-yard dash in 9.8 seconds. He won both hurdles and the long jump at the 1947 CIF California State Meet.

== College career ==
After graduating, he attended Compton Junior College (now El Camino College Compton Center), where he was a standout on Compton's undefeated football team in 1948 that won the Junior Rose Bowl. That year, he had a 105-yard kickoff return touchdown in a game played at the University of Mexico. Already being considered one of the best players in football, McElhenny drew high praise; Heisman Trophy winner Tom Harmon remarked he had "never seen such a combination of speed and size." One of his Compton teammates was 1952 Olympic gold medalist Sim Iness.

After a year at Compton, McElhenny attended the University of Washington in Seattle. He starred as a fullback for the Washington Huskies football team, forming a prolific offensive duo with quarterback Don Heinrich in 1950. He rushed for over 1,000 yards that season, and was the last Huskies player to eclipse that mark until 1976. In a game against rival Washington State, he set school records with 296 rushing yards and five touchdowns. The 296 yards remains a school record as of 2016. In three appearances against the Washington State Cougars, he rushed for 578 yards (10.1 yards per carry) and scored seven touchdowns to lead the Huskies to win the Apple Cup twice.

One of McElhenny's celebrated plays at Husky Stadium was an uncommon 100-yard punt return against USC in 1951. The following week, he successfully kicked nine out of nine extra points in a 63–6 blowout over Oregon. He was a first-team All-Pacific Coast Conference (PCC) selection in both 1950 and 1951, and was selected for the Associated Press (AP) 1951 All-America team as a fullback. Following his senior season he played in a regional college all-star game. McElhenny led the team in rushing in each of his three seasons and set 16 school records, including season (1,107) and career (2,499) rushing yards.

== Professional career ==
=== San Francisco 49ers ===
The San Francisco 49ers selected McElhenny in the first round, with the ninth overall selection, of the 1952 NFL draft. His first play as a professional was a 40-yard touchdown run which had been drawn in the dirt because he had not yet learned the team's playbook. He recorded the season's longest run from scrimmage (89 yards), the longest punt return (94 yards), and the top rushing average (7.0 yards per carry). He was unanimously recognized as the season's top rookie.

McElhenny was also an asset in the receiving game, becoming a favorite target of quarterback Y. A. Tittle on screen passes. His versatility drew praise from opposing coaches, including George Halas of the Chicago Bears and Steve Owen of the New York Giants. Former Bears quarterback Johnny Lujack lauded McElhenny as "the best running back I have seen in a long, long time." Also noted was his vision; he had an uncanny ability of seeing and reacting to tacklers in his peripheral vision. "If you ever watched McElhenny", explained Washington State coach Jim Sutherland, "you'd think he had eyes on the back of his head. I've seen him cut away from a tackler that 99 percent of the backs wouldn't even have seen. It wasn't instinct—he just saw the guy, out of the corner of his eye." McElhenny described his playing style as such:

My attitude carrying the ball was fear—not a fear of getting hurt but a fear of getting caught from behind and taken down and embarrassing myself and my teammates.

McElhenny repeated as a Pro Bowler for 1953, joining his backfield teammates, Tittle and fullback Joe Perry. In 1954, with the addition of halfback John Henry Johnson, the 49ers formed their famed "Million Dollar Backfield" of McElhenny, Tittle, Perry, and Johnson. The team had championship aspirations, but McElhenny separated his shoulder against the Bears in the sixth game, ending his season. The offense struggled without McElhenny in the lineup. Before the injury, he led the league with 515 rushing yards and an 8.0 yards-per-carry average. He still managed to make the AP's second-team All-Pro team and was a first-team selection by the New York Daily News.

After a down year in 1955 for the 49ers and for McElhenny, he had his most productive rushing season statistically in 1956, picking up 916 yards and eight touchdowns. He was invited to his third Pro Bowl. John Henry Johnson was traded prior to the 1957 season, which broke up the Million Dollar Backfield. Led by McElhenny and Tittle, the 49ers finished the 1957 regular season tied for the Western Conference title with the Detroit Lions. In the Western Conference tiebreaker, McElhenny carried 14 times for 82 yards and caught six passes for 96 yards and a touchdown, but the Lions won with a comeback victory to advance to the 1957 NFL Championship Game. Following the season, McElhenny was invited to the 1958 Pro Bowl and was named the player of the game.

After another Pro Bowl year in 1958, injuries over the next two seasons hampered his production. The 49ers placed the 32-year-old McElhenny on the 1961 NFL expansion draft list.

=== Minnesota Vikings ===
McElhenny joined the newly formed Vikings in 1961 through the expansion draft. That year, he led the team in rushing and had seven total touchdowns, including his first punt return touchdown since his rookie season. He was invited to his sixth Pro Bowl following the season. In his second season with the Vikings in 1962, he was held scoreless for the first time in his career. The Vikings then looked to part ways with McElhenny as the team turned to an emphasis on youth. He described his time with the Vikings as a "dead end street," since he "didn't fit into their plans for the future."

=== New York Giants ===
The Vikings traded McElhenny to the Giants in July 1963 for two draft choices and player to be named later. The trade reunited him with Tittle, who had been traded to the Giants two seasons earlier. On the reunion, McElhenny responded that it was "great to be with a winner," and he played with renewed enthusiasm. The Giants made it to the 1963 NFL Championship Game, where McElhenny carried nine times for 17 yards, had two receptions for 20 yards, and had a 47-yard kickoff return in the 14–10 loss to the Bears. He was released by New York during training camp in 1964.

=== Detroit Lions ===
McElhenny was soon picked up by the Detroit Lions, for whom he appeared in eight games before retiring after the season.

== NFL career statistics ==
Legend
	Led the league
**Bold**	Career high

Year	Team	Games		Rushing						Receiving					Fumbles	
Year	Team	GP	GS	Att	Yds	Avg	Y/G	Lng	TD	Rec	Yds	Avg	Lng	TD	Fum	FR
1952	SF	12	12	98	684	7.0	57.0	**89**	6	26	367	14.1	**77**	**3**	5	0
1953	SF	12	12	112	503	4.5	41.9	33	3	30	**474**	15.8	71	2	6	1
1954	SF	6	6	64	515	**8.0**	**85.8**	60	6	8	162	**20.3**	53	0	4	2
1955	SF	12	8	90	327	3.6	27.3	44	4	11	203	18.5	55	2	3	2
1956	SF	12	11	**185**	**916**	5.0	76.3	86	**8**	16	193	12.1	22	0	4	1
1957	SF	12	10	102	478	4.7	39.8	61	1	**37**	458	12.4	43	2	8	3
1958	SF	12	12	113	451	4.0	37.6	34	6	31	366	11.8	59	2	**10**	**4**
1959	SF	10	9	18	67	3.7	6.7	18	1	22	329	15.0	72	**3**	1	1
1960	SF	11	9	95	347	3.7	31.5	38	0	14	114	8.1	45	1	2	0
1961	MIN	13	**13**	120	570	4.8	43.8	41	3	**37**	283	7.6	26	**3**	8	2
1962	MIN	11	3	50	200	4.0	18.2	27	0	16	191	11.9	41	0	3	1
1963	NYG	**14**	1	55	175	3.2	12.5	23	0	11	91	8.3	24	2	3	2
1964	DET	8	1	22	48	2.2	6.0	14	0	5	16	3.2	27	0	–	–
Career		145	107	1,124	5,281	4.7	36.4	89	38	264	3,247	12.3	77	20	57	19

== Legacy ==
McElhenny gained 11,375 all-purpose yards in his 13-year career and retired as one of just three players to eclipse 11,000 yards. He was nicknamed "The King" while with the 49ers because he was "the most feared running back in the NFL." 49ers quarterback Frankie Albert gave him the nickname in the locker room following McElhenny's fourth game as a rookie, in which he returned a punt 96 yards for a touchdown against the Bears.

He was elected to the Pro Football Hall of Fame in 1970, an honor he described as the highlight of his life. Others inducted in the class were contemporaries Jack Christiansen, Tom Fears, and Pete Pihos. His jersey number 39 is retired by the 49ers, and by virtue of his membership in the pro hall of fame, he was automatically inducted as a charter member of the San Francisco 49ers Hall of Fame in 2009. NFL Network ranked him the fourth most elusive runner of all time in 2007.

McElhenny was inducted into State of Washington Sports Hall of Fame in 1963 and the College Football Hall of Fame in 1981. In 1979, he became one of ten inaugural members inducted into the University of Washington Husky Hall of Fame in 1979. As of 2016, his 12 rushing touchdowns in 1950 and 13 in 1951 both remain in the top ten all-time for a Washington player in a single season, and his 28 career rushing touchdowns tie him for sixth in school history. As of 2022, McElhenny's 296 yards rushing in 1950 against Washington State remains the single game record at the University of Washington. On January 20, 1985, McElhenny participated in the opening coin toss at Super Bowl XIX at Stanford Stadium, along with U.S. President Ronald Reagan, who participated by video feed from the White House after having been sworn into his second term of office earlier that day.

=== Improper benefits ===
After denying rumors for decades, in 2004 McElhenny confirmed that he received improper financial benefits from the University of Washington during his time there, which included a $300 monthly check. Per NCAA rules, the most a college can offer an athlete is a summer job and a scholarship covering boarding and tuition. A popular (albeit usually jocular) spin on the rumor was that McElhenny essentially took a pay cut when he left the university to play for the 49ers. This was not entirely untrue; all payments accounted for, including legitimate ones, McElhenny claimed he and his wife received a combined $10,000 a year while at Washington—with the 49ers, his rookie salary was worth $7,000.

== Personal and later life ==
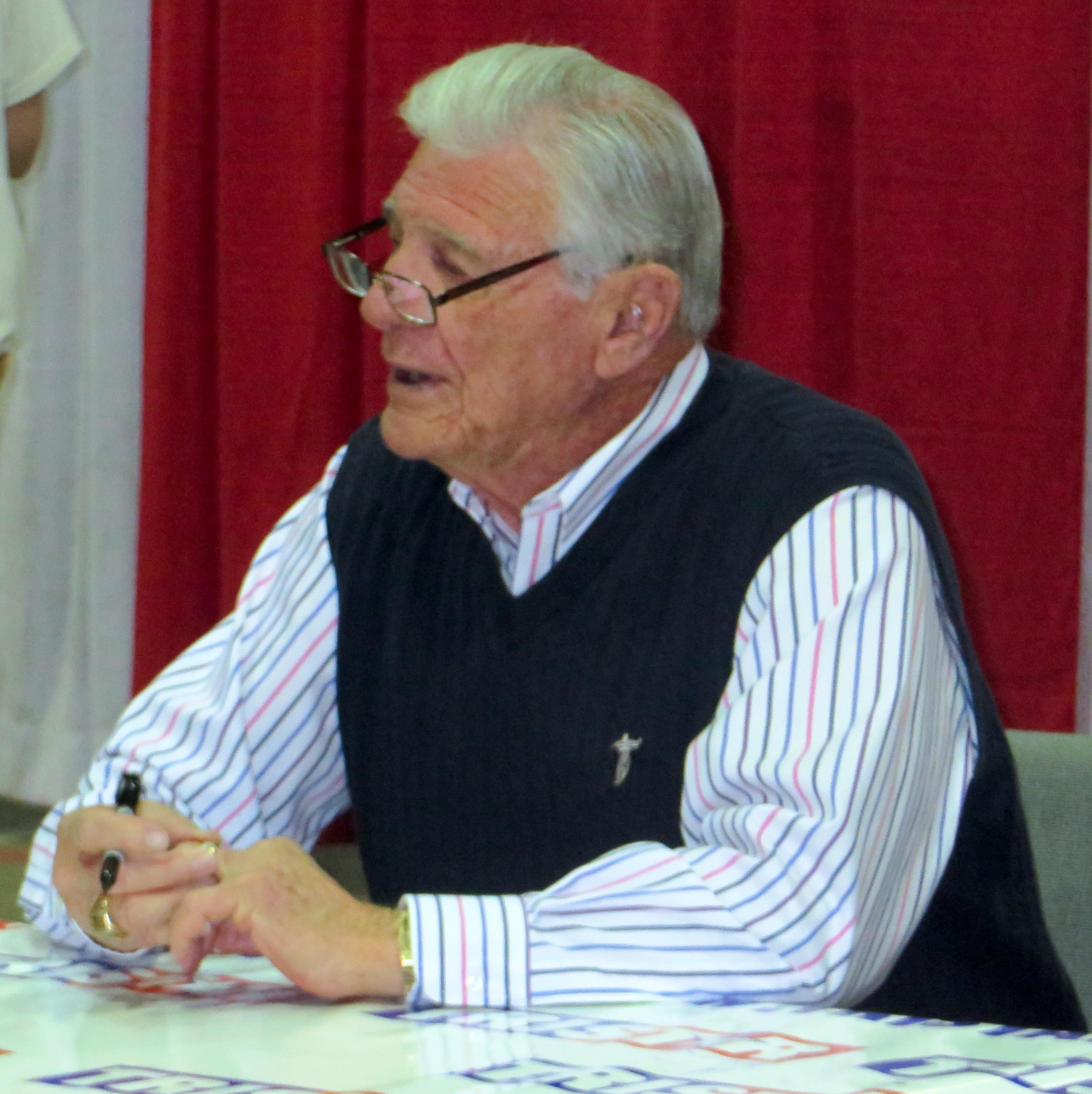
McElhenny at a sports card show in 2014

After retiring as a player, McElhenny served as a color commentator on 49ers radio broadcasts from 1966 to 1972. In 1971, he signed a contract with a group called the Seattle Sea Lions in hopes of bringing an NFL franchise to Seattle. He proactively named himself general manager of the non-existent "Seattle Kings" in May 1972, and the next year the franchise gained the backing of entrepreneur Edward Nixon, brother of president Richard Nixon. However, McElhenny's plans fell through, as the Seattle Seahawks were founded in 1974.

McElhenny was related to the McIlhenny family of Louisiana, the makers of Tabasco sauce. In his later life, McElhenny was diagnosed with a rare nerve disorder called Guillain–Barré syndrome, which almost killed him. He was temporarily paralyzed from the neck down and had to use a walker for a year.

McElhenny died at his home in Henderson, Nevada, on June 17, 2022.

== See also ==
- Washington Huskies football statistical leaders
