= Tommy Wilson (American football) =

American football player (1932–2006)

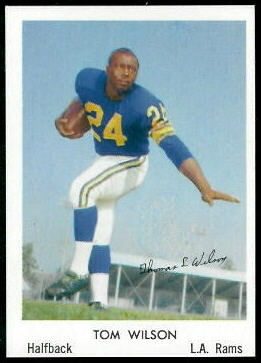
- Wilson in 1959

No. 37, 24, 49, 32, 31
- Positions: Halfback, fullback

Personal information
- Born: September 1, 1932; Stamford, Connecticut, U.S.
- Died: December 31, 2006 (aged 74); Pittsburg, California, U.S.
- Listed height: 6 ft 0 in (1.83 m)
- Listed weight: 203 lb (92 kg)

Career information
- High school: Hillside (Durham, North Carolina)
- NFL draft: 1956: undrafted

Career history
- Los Angeles Rams (1956–1961); Cleveland Browns (1962); Minnesota Vikings (1963); Richmond Rebels (1965–1966); Atlanta Falcons (1966)*; Brooklyn Dodgers (1966)
- * Offseason or practice squad member only

Awards and highlights
- Second-team All-Pro (1957); Pro Bowl (1957)

Career NFL statistics
- Rushing yards: 2,553
- Rushing average: 5
- Receptions: 61
- Receiving yards: 617
- Total touchdowns: 24
- Stats at Pro Football Reference

Thomas Lee Wilson (September 1, 1932 – December 31, 2006) was an American professional football player who was a fullback and halfback for eight seasons in the National Football League (NFL). He played for the Los Angeles Rams (1956–1961), Cleveland Rams (1962), and Minnesota Vikings (1963). Wilson gained 2,553 rushing yards and 617 receiving yards and scored 24 touchdowns.

== Early life ==
Wilson was born in 1932 in Stamford, Connecticut. He played high school football at Hillside High School in Durham, North Carolina. He did not play college football.

== Professional career ==
Wilson played fullback and halfback for eight seasons in the National Football League (NFL). He played for the Los Angeles Rams from 1956 to 1961. He was chosen for the Pro Bowl in 1957 after rushing for 616 yards, fifth best in the NFL. He finished his career in 1962 for the Cleveland Browns and 1963 for the Minnesota Vikings. He totaled 2,553 rushing yards.

== NFL career statistics ==
Legend
**Bold**	Career high

Year	Team	Games		Rushing					Receiving				
Year	Team	GP	GS	Att	Yds	Avg	Lng	TD	Rec	Yds	Avg	Lng	TD
1956	RAM	12	4	64	470	**7.3**	46	0	6	86	**14.3**	34	0
1957	RAM	11	7	**127**	**616**	4.9	46	3	7	95	13.6	19	1
1958	RAM	12	5	73	475	6.5	**82**	**9**	9	101	11.2	38	1
1959	RAM	12	4	40	210	5.3	60	0	**12**	83	6.9	20	1
1960	RAM	11	1	41	139	3.4	35	0	11	82	7.5	40	**2**
1961	RAM	11	5	44	220	5.0	34	1	1	12	12.0	12	0
1962	CLE	14	5	46	141	3.1	17	1	8	**110**	13.8	**42**	0
1963	MIN	8	2	73	282	3.9	30	4	7	48	6.9	21	0
Career		91	33	508	2,553	5.0	82	18	61	617	10.1	42	5

== Personal life ==
His son Steve Wilson, was a defensive back in the NFL for ten seasons.

Wilson died in 2006 at age 74 in Pittsburg, California.
