= Dick Pesonen =

American football player (born 1938)

No. 48, 22, 25, 37
- Position: Defensive back

Personal information
- Born: June 10, 1938 (age 88); Grand Rapids, Minnesota, U.S.
- Died: November 3, 2023; Boca Raton, Florida, U.S.
- Listed height: 6 ft 0 in (1.83 m)
- Listed weight: 190 lb (86 kg)

Career information
- High school: Proctor (MN)
- College: Minnesota (1956); Minnesota-Duluth (1958-1959)
- NFL draft: 1960: undrafted

Career history

Playing
- Green Bay Packers (1960); Minnesota Vikings (1961); New York Giants (1962–1964); Newark Bears / Orlando Panthers (1965-1967)

Coaching
- Orlando Panthers (1966) Defensive backfield coach; Orlando Panthers (1967) Defensive coach; Orlando Panthers (1968-1969) Head coach; Long Island Bulls (1970) Assistant coach; Houston Texans-Shreveport Steamer (1974) Defensive backs coach; San Antonio Wings (1975) Defensive backs coach

Career NFL statistics
- Interceptions: 4
- Fumble recoveries: 1
- Return yards: 380
- Stats at Pro Football Reference

Dick Pesonen is a former defensive back in the National Football League. Pesonen first played with the Green Bay Packers during the 1960 NFL season. He was later selected in the 1961 NFL expansion draft by the Minnesota Vikings and played that season with the team. From there he played three seasons with the New York Giants.

Dick died on November 3, 2023, in Boca Raton, Florida.
