= Falls High School =

Location
- 1515 11th Street; International Falls, Minnesota 56649; United States; 48.5944444°N 93.4263889°W

Information
- Type: Public high school
- School district: International Falls Independent School District
- Principal: Lisa West
- Grades: 6–12
- Enrollment: 496 (2023–2024)
- Colors: Purple and Gold
- Mascot: Bronco
- Nickname: Broncos
- Website: www.isd361.k12.mn.us/schools/fhs/

Falls High School is a public high school located in International Falls, Minnesota, United States. The school's class ring design dates back to 1929, making it one of the oldest class ring traditions in the United States of America. As of 2014 approximately 600 students attend classes in the school. Every grade level ranges from 70-100 students. In the Fall of 2014 the school changed policies and changed over from a 6 period day to a 7 period day. The students have 5 minutes between each class to maneuver to the next one.

Included on campus are a sports arena for hockey (also used for spring and fall sports training), football practice fields, and track field, several baseball and softball diamonds, and a swimming pool. There is a parking lot for students who use their own vehicles to travel to school (all it requires is a sticker in the window that students can sign up for in the office). There is also a separate lot for teachers parking.

The current principal is Lisa West.

Falls high school is on the border of the United States and Canada at the most northern part of Koochiching County.

The Falls' rival school is variant for different sports, but typically a good battle between the Hibbing High School in Hibbing, Minnesota.

As of the 2010–11 school year, the school had an enrollment of 658 students and 34 classroom teachers (on an FTE basis), for a student-teacher ratio of 20.08.

== Clubs ==
Clubs offered at Falls High School include:Bowling, FACS, Freshman, Sophomore, Junior, and Senior Class Committees, Knowledge Bowl, Ojibwe Quiz Bowl, Math Team, National Honor Society, Speech Team, FIRST Robotics Competition, and Student Council.

Adding onto the Bowling. On May 22, 2021, The combined International Falls/Indus/Lake of The Woods team won the 2021 Minnesota State High School Class A bowling tournament at AMF Southtown Lanes in Bloomington, MN

== Sports ==
Sports offered by the school include cheerleading, swimming and diving, basketball, volleyball, cross country, hockey, football, baseball, softball, track and field. Athletes have the name Broncos, named after Falls High attendee Bronko Nagurski. The colors are purple, gold, and white.

=== Fall sports ===
Girls: Cross Country, Volleyball, Girls: Swimming and Diving Boys: Cross Country, Football (Cheerleader)

=== Winter sports ===
Girls: Hockey, Basketball Boys: Hockey (Cheerleader), Basketball (Cheerleader), Boys: Swimming and Diving

=== Spring sports ===
Girls: Track and Field, Softball, Golf Boys: Track and Field, Baseball, Golf
