= Bill Lapham =

American football player (1934–2016)

No. 54, 52
- Position: Center

Personal information
- Born: February 2, 1934; Des Moines, Iowa, U.S.
- Died: November 8, 2016 (aged 82); Des Moines, Iowa, U.S.
- Listed height: 6 ft 5 in (1.96 m)
- Listed weight: 238 lb (108 kg)

Career information
- High school: Lincoln (Des Moines)
- College: Drake (1952); Iowa (1957–1959)
- NFL draft: 1958: 14th round, 160th overall pick

Career history
- Philadelphia Eagles (1960); Minnesota Vikings (1961); Denver Broncos (1962–1963)*
- * Offseason or practice squad member only

Awards and highlights
- NFL champion (1960); Second-team All-Big Ten (1959)

Career NFL statistics
- Games played: 26
- Games started: 17
- Fumble recoveries: 1
- Stats at Pro Football Reference

William Gaius Lapham (February 2, 1934 – November 8, 2016) was an American professional football center who played two seasons in the National Football League (NFL) with the Philadelphia Eagles and Minnesota Vikings. He played college football at Drake University and the University of Iowa.

== Early life and college ==
William Gaius Lapham was born on February 2, 1934, in Des Moines, Iowa. He attended Abraham Lincoln High School in Des Moines.

Lapham was a member of the Drake Bulldogs of Drake University in 1952. After a stint in the United States Air Force, Lapham was a three-year letterman for the Iowa Hawkeyes of the University of Iowa from 1957 to 1959. He was named second-team All-Big Ten by both the Associated Press and United Press International in 1959.

== Professional career ==
Lapham was selected by the Philadelphia Eagles in the 14th round, with the 160th overall pick, of the 1958 NFL draft. He was also selected by the Houston Oilers in the "first selections" portion of the 1960 American Football League draft. He signed with the Eagles on January 14, 1960. He played in all 12 games, starting four, for the Eagles during the 1960 NFL season. Lapham also played in the 1960 NFL Championship Game victory over the Green Bay Packers.

Lapham was selected by the Minnesota Vikings in the 1961 NFL expansion draft. He appeared in all 14 games, starting 13 at center, for the Vikings during their inaugural season in 1961. The Vikings finished the year with a 3–11 record. Lapham became a free agent after the season.

He signed with the Denver Broncos of the AFL in 1962, but was later released on September 4, 1962. He signed with the Broncos again in 1963 but was released later.

== Personal life ==
Lapham died on November 8, 2016, at the age of 82 in Des Moines.
