= Jack Morris (American football) =

American football player (1931–2022)

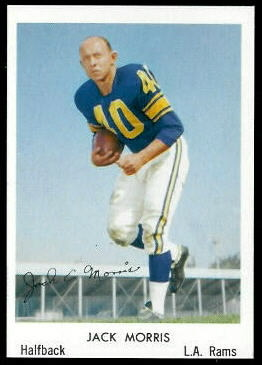
- Morris in 1959

No. 40, 20
- Positions: Defensive back, kicker

Personal information
- Born: November 1, 1931; White City, Kansas, U.S.
- Died: April 27, 2022 (aged 90); Redmond, Oregon, U.S.
- Listed height: 6 ft 0 in (1.83 m)
- Listed weight: 189 lb (86 kg)

Career information
- College: Oregon
- NFL draft: 1956: 7th round, 84th overall pick

Career history
- Los Angeles Rams (1958–1960); Pittsburgh Steelers (1960); Minnesota Vikings (1961)

Awards and highlights
- Second-team All-PCC (1957)

Career NFL statistics
- Games played: 45
- Starts: 32
- Interceptions: 8
- Fumble recoveries: 2
- Touchdowns: 1
- Stats at Pro Football Reference

John Bradley Morris (November 1, 1931 – April 27, 2022) was an American professional football player who was a defensive back for four seasons in the National Football League (NFL). He played for the Los Angeles Rams, Pittsburgh Steelers, and Minnesota Vikings from 1958 to 1961, having earlier played college football at the University of Oregon.

== Early life ==
Morris was born in White City, Kansas, on November 1, 1931. He was raised in Medford, Oregon, and attended Medford High School. There, he was a standout American football player and track and field athlete, winning three state titles in hurdling.

After graduating in 1950, Morris studied at the University of Oregon. He joined the US Air Force after completing his freshman year and consequently served in the Korean War. Upon his return from military service, he established an Oregon Ducks record with 68 points in a single season and started his school-record 23 straight successful conversions. He also competed on the Oregon Ducks track and field team. He then led the team with 519 rushing yards the following year, and became co-captain of the team by his senior year. At the time of his graduation, he was ranked third all-time at Oregon in points scored (130) and rushing yards (1,631). Morris was drafted by the Los Angeles Rams in the seventh round (84th overall selection) of the 1956 NFL draft.

== Career ==
Morris made his NFL debut with the Rams on September 28, 1958, at the age of 26, in a 30–27 loss against the Cleveland Browns. During his rookie season, he finished second in the league in interceptions returned for touchdown (1), fourth in interception return yards (152), and seventh in interceptions (6), longest interception return (44 yards), and defensive touchdowns (1). He also led the franchise in interceptions that year. After just under three seasons with the franchise, he joined the Pittsburgh Steelers midway through the 1960 season. He then joined the newly established Minnesota Vikings the following year and recorded the third-longest interception return in the NFL (65 yards).

Morris was part of the inaugural class inducted into Medford's Sports Hall of Fame in 1985. Twenty years later, he was enshrined in the University of Oregon Athletic Hall of Fame, having earlier been honored as part of the 1957 Ducks football team when they were inducted in 1994.

== Personal life ==
Morris was married to Lois until his death. Together, they had four children: Tricia, Dana, Jolie, and Carl.

Morris showed signs of chronic traumatic encephalopathy during his later years. He died on April 27, 2022, at his home in Redmond, Oregon. He was 90, and suffered from Alzheimer's disease prior to his death.
