= Gene Selawski =

American football player (1935–1993)

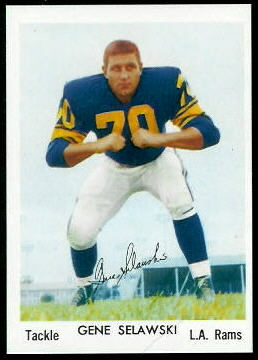
- Selawski in 1959

No. 70, 78
- Positions: Tackle, guard

Personal information
- Born: November 28, 1935; Cleveland, Ohio, U.S.
- Died: May 11, 1993 (aged 57); Duluth, Georgia, U.S.
- Listed height: 6 ft 4 in (1.93 m)
- Listed weight: 252 lb (114 kg)

Career information
- High school: John Adams (Cleveland)
- College: Purdue
- NFL draft: 1958: 9th round, 104th overall pick

Career history
- Los Angeles Rams (1959); Cleveland Browns (1960); Minnesota Vikings (1961)*; San Diego Chargers (1961)
- * Offseason or practice squad member only

Awards and highlights
- First-team All-American (1958); First-team All-Big Ten (1958)

Career NFL/AFL statistics
- Games played: 32
- Games started: 5
- Fumble recoveries: 1
- Stats at Pro Football Reference

Eugene Frank Selawski (November 28, 1935 – May 11, 1993) was an American football player. He was a first-team All-American tackle at Purdue University in 1958 and played three years of professional football for the Los Angeles Rams (1959), Cleveland Browns (1960) and San Diego Chargers (1961).

== Early life ==
Selawski was born and raised in Cleveland, and graduated from John Adams High School. He then attended Purdue University where he played college football at the tackle position for the Purdue Boilermakers football team from 1956 to 1958. He was selected by the Football Writers Association of America as a first-team tackle on its 1958 College Football All-America Team.

== Career ==
Selawski was drafted 104th overall by the Los Angeles Rams in the ninth round of the 1958 NFL draft and played for the Rams in 12 games during the 1959 NFL season. In 1960, he returned to Ohio to play in 12 games for his hometown Cleveland Browns. In 1961, he jumped to the American Football League, appearing in eight games for the San Diego Chargers.

== Death ==
Selawski died May 9, 1993, at age 57, in Duluth, Georgia.
