= Fred Murphy (American football player) =

American football player (1938–2001)

No. 87, 88
- Position: End

Personal information
- Born: February 20, 1938; Atlanta, Georgia, U.S.
- Died: February 4, 2001 (aged 62)
- Listed height: 6 ft 3 in (1.91 m)
- Listed weight: 205 lb (93 kg)

Career information
- High school: Fulton (GA)
- College: Georgia Tech

Career history
- Cleveland Browns (1960); Minnesota Vikings (1961)

Career statistics
- Games played: 22
- Receptions: 2
- Receiving Yards: 36
- Stats at Pro Football Reference

Fred Joe Murphy (February 20, 1938 – February 4, 2001) was a player in the National Football League. He played for the Cleveland Browns and the Minnesota Vikings. He played college football for the Georgia Tech Yellow Jackets.
