= Lebron Shields =

American football player (born 1937)

No. 73, 77, 63
- Positions: Defensive end, offensive tackle

Personal information
- Born: July 23, 1937 (age 89); Walker County, Georgia, U.S.
- Listed height: 6 ft 4 in (1.93 m)
- Listed weight: 250 lb (113 kg)

Career information
- High school: LaFayette
- College: Tennessee
- NFL draft: 1959: 22nd round, 256th overall pick
- AFL draft: 1960

Career history
- Baltimore Colts (1960); Minnesota Vikings (1961); Toronto Argonauts (1962)

Career NFL statistics
- Sacks: 2
- Safeties: 1
- Stats at Pro Football Reference

Lebron Shields (born July 23, 1937) is an American former professional football player who was a defensive end with the Baltimore Colts and Minnesota Vikings in the National Football League (NFL). He played college football for the Tennessee Volunteers. He was selected by the Detroit Lions in the 22nd round of the 1959 NFL draft with the 256th overall pick. In Week 11 of the 1960 season, against the Lions, Shields recorded a safety.
