= Paul Winslow (American football) =

American football player (1938–2012)

No. 23
- Position: Defensive back

Personal information
- Born: February 28, 1938; Elizabeth City, North Carolina, U.S.
- Died: May 10, 2012 (aged 74); Elizabeth City, North Carolina, U.S.
- Listed height: 5 ft 11 in (1.80 m)
- Listed weight: 200 lb (91 kg)

Career information
- High school: Elizabeth City (NC) P. W. Moore
- College: North Carolina Central
- NFL draft: 1960: 13th round, 149th overall pick
- AFL draft: 1960

Career history
- Green Bay Packers (1960)

Career NFL statistics
- Games played: 12
- Stats at Pro Football Reference

Paul Lawrence Winslow Jr. (February 28, 1938 – May 10, 2012) was a defensive back in the National Football League (NFL). He was drafted by the Green Bay Packers in the thirteenth round of the 1960 NFL draft and played that season with the team.

In the 1961 NFL expansion draft Paul Winslow was selected, for the newly created NFL franchise, the Minnesota Vikings .

== Family life and death ==
He died on May 10, 2012, leaving behind a wife and two sons Paul III and Troy.
