= Karl Rubke =

American football player (1935–2009)

- Rubke in 1960

No. 52, 54, 74, 80
- Positions: Center, linebacker, defensive tackle, defensive end

Personal information
- Born: December 6, 1935; Los Angeles, California, U.S.
- Died: April 27, 2009 (aged 73); Marietta, Georgia, U.S.
- Listed height: 6 ft 4 in (1.93 m)
- Listed weight: 240 lb (109 kg)

Career information
- High school: Mount Carmel (Los Angeles)
- College: USC (1954–1956)
- NFL draft: 1957: 5th round, 56th overall pick

Career history
- San Francisco 49ers (1957–1960); Minnesota Vikings (1961); San Francisco 49ers (1962–1965); Atlanta Falcons (1966–1967); Oakland Raiders (1968)

Awards and highlights
- Second-team All-PCC (1956)

Career NFL/AFL statistics
- Games played: 143
- Games started: 82
- Fumble recoveries: 9
- Sacks: 8
- Stats at Pro Football Reference

Karl John Rubke (December 6, 1935 – April 27, 2009) was a professional American football center and linebacker in the National Football League (NFL) and the American Football League (AFL).

== College career ==
He played college football at the University of Southern California.

== Professional career ==
Rubke was drafted by the San Francisco 49ers in the fifth round (56th overall) of the 1957 NFL draft. He played for the NFL's 49ers (1957–1960, 1962–1965), the Minnesota Vikings (1961), the Atlanta Falcons (1966–1967), and the AFL's Oakland Raiders (1968).

== See also ==
- Other American Football League players
