= Rich Mostardi =

American football player (born 1938)

No. 22, 24, 27
- Position: Defensive back

Personal information
- Born: July 1, 1938 (age 88); Bryn Mawr, Pennsylvania, U.S.
- Listed height: 5 ft 11 in (1.80 m)
- Listed weight: 188 lb (85 kg)

Career information
- High school: Upper Darby (Drexel Hill, Pennsylvania)
- College: Charleston (1956); Kent State (1957–1959)
- NFL draft: 1960: 12th round, 141st overall pick
- AFL draft: 1960

Career history
- Cleveland Browns (1960); Minnesota Vikings (1961); Oakland Raiders (1962)

Career NFL/AFL statistics
- Interceptions: 2
- Fumble recoveries: 3
- Stats at Pro Football Reference

Richard Albert Mostardi (other sources give Mostardo) (born July 1, 1938) is an American former professional football player who was a defensive back with the Cleveland Browns and Minnesota Vikings of the National Football League (NFL) and Oakland Raiders of the American Football League (AFL). He played college football for the Charleston Golden Eagles and Kent State Golden Flashes. He is a member of the Kent State Athletics Hall of Fame.
