= Don Boll =

American football player (1927–2001)

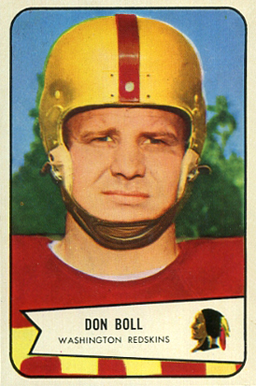
- Boll on a 1954 Bowman football card

No. 62, 78
- Positions: Tackle, guard

Personal information
- Born: July 16, 1927; Scribner, Nebraska, U.S.
- Died: December 29, 2001 (aged 74); West Point, Nebraska, U.S.
- Listed height: 6 ft 2 in (1.88 m)
- Listed weight: 270 lb (122 kg)

Career information
- High school: Scribner
- College: Nebraska (1949–1952)
- NFL draft: 1953: 4th round, 41st overall pick

Career history
- Washington Redskins (1953–1959); New York Giants (1960); Minnesota Vikings (1961)*
- * Offseason or practice squad member only

Awards and highlights
- Second-team All-Pro (1956)

Career NFL statistics
- Games played: 92
- Games started: 74
- Fumble recoveries: 6
- Stats at Pro Football Reference

Donald Elroy Boll (July 16, 1927 – December 29, 2001) was an American professional football offensive lineman in the National Football League (NFL) for the Washington Redskins and New York Giants. He played college football at the University of Nebraska and was selected in the fourth round of the 1953 NFL draft.
