= Bill Kimber =

American football player (born 1936)

No. 86
- Position: Defensive end

Personal information
- Born: January 31, 1936 (age 90); Winter Park, Florida
- Listed height: 6 ft 2 in (1.88 m)
- Listed weight: 192 lb (87 kg)

Career information
- High school: Winter Park (FL)
- College: Florida State

Career history
- New York Giants (1959–1960); Boston Patriots (1961)
- Stats at Pro Football Reference

https://www.psacard.com/cardfacts/football-cards/1960-fleer/bill-kimber-121/116310

Bill Kimber (born January 31, 1936) is an American former football defensive end. He played for the New York Giants from 1959 to 1960 and for the Boston Patriots in 1961.

He attended Winter Park High School, graduating in 1954.
