= Gerry Huth =

American football player (1933–2011)

No. 65
- Position: Guard

Personal information
- Born: July 23, 1933; Floyds Knobs, Indiana, U.S.
- Died: February 11, 2011 (aged 77); Las Vegas, Nevada, U.S.
- Listed height: 6 ft 0 in (1.83 m)
- Listed weight: 226 lb (103 kg)

Career information
- High school: New Albany (New Albany, Indiana)
- College: Wake Forest
- NFL draft: 1956: 24th round, 285th overall pick

Career history
- New York Giants (1956); Philadelphia Eagles (1959–1960); Minnesota Vikings (1961–1963)

Awards and highlights
- 2× NFL champion (1956, 1960)

Career NFL statistics
- Games played: 74
- Games started: 62
- Fumble recoveries: 6
- Stats at Pro Football Reference

Gerald Bernard Huth (July 23, 1933 – February 11, 2011) was an American professional football guard who played in the National Football League (NFL) for the New York Giants, the Philadelphia Eagles and the Minnesota Vikings. He played college football at Wake Forest University and was drafted 285th overall in the 24th round of the 1956 NFL draft.

Postmortem research diagnosed Huth with chronic traumatic encephalopathy. He was one of at least 345 NFL players to be diagnosed after death with this disease, which is caused by repeated hits to the head.
