= Clancy Osborne =

American football player (1934–2017)

No. 33, 31, 81
- Position: Linebacker

Personal information
- Born: November 23, 1934; Lubbock, Texas, U.S.
- Died: September 9, 2017 (aged 82); California, U.S.
- Listed height: 6 ft 3 in (1.91 m)
- Listed weight: 210 lb (95 kg)

Career information
- High school: Palo Verde
- College: Arizona State
- NFL draft: 1957: 27th round, 315th overall pick

Career history
- San Francisco 49ers (1959–1960); Minnesota Vikings (1961–1962); Oakland Raiders (1963–1964)

Career NFL/AFL statistics
- Interceptions: 8
- Fumble recoveries: 6
- Sacks: 9
- Stats at Pro Football Reference

Clarence Dewitt Osborne (November 23, 1934 – September 9, 2017) was an American football player who played with the San Francisco 49ers, Minnesota Vikings, and Oakland Raiders. He played college football at Arizona State University. Osborne grew up in Blythe, California. He died in 2017.
