= Bill Roehnelt =

American football player (1936–1968)

No. 69, 53, 63, 68
- Position: Linebacker

Personal information
- Born: June 4, 1936; Peoria, Illinois, U.S.
- Died: July 23, 1968
- Listed height: 6 ft 1 in (1.85 m)
- Listed weight: 227 lb (103 kg)

Career information
- High school: Chillicothe
- College: Bradley
- NFL draft: 1958: 19th round, 219th overall pick

Career history
- Chicago Bears (1958–1959); Washington Redskins (1960); Denver Broncos (1961-1962)

Career NFL/AFL statistics
- Sacks: 2
- Stats at Pro Football Reference

William Edward Roehnelt (Pronounced: RAY-nelt) (June 4, 1936 – July 23, 1968) was an American football linebacker in the National Football League (NFL) for the Chicago Bears and the Washington Redskins; and in the American Football League (AFL) for the Denver Broncos. He played college football at Bradley University.

== College career ==
After a high school career at Chillicothe High School that saw him named to multiple all-state teams twice, Roehnelt accepted a scholarship to play football for Bradley University. Playing both ways as an offensive lineman and defensive linebacker, he helped the Bradley Braves to four consecutive winning seasons. He gained Little All-America status during his senior season. He is a member of Bradley University's Hall of Fame.

== Professional career and death ==
Roehnelt was taken in the 19th round (219th overall) of the 1958 NFL draft by the Chicago Bears. He appeared in 12 games during the 1958–59 seasons. Traded to the Washington Redskins in the off-season, he played 12 games for the Redskins during the 1960 season before joining the Denver Broncos where he played two seasons as a defensive linebacker. In 1962, the Broncos put him on waivers.

Roehnelt then served in the military. His Air National Guard unit was activated in 1965 and he served two years before trying out with the Minnesota Vikings in a comeback attempt. When that didn't work out, he became a tire salesman in Richmond, Virginia. On July 23, 1968, he was killed in a two-car collision.

In all, Roehnelt appeared in 54 NFL games, intercepting two passes and returning one kickoff in his seven seasons.

== See also ==
- Other American Football League players
