= Bill Bishop (American football) =

American football player (1931–1998)

No. 73, 72
- Positions: Defensive tackle, offensive tackle

Personal information
- Born: May 8, 1931; Borger, Texas, U.S.
- Died: May 14, 1998 (aged 67); Geneva, Illinois, U.S.
- Listed height: 6 ft 4 in (1.93 m)
- Listed weight: 248 lb (112 kg)

Career information
- College: North Texas
- NFL draft: 1952: 8th round, 90th overall pick

Career history
- Chicago Bears (1952–1960); Minnesota Vikings (1961)

Awards and highlights
- Pro Bowl (1954)

Career NFL statistics
- Games played: 117
- Games started: 103
- Fumble recoveries: 14
- Stats at Pro Football Reference

William Eugene Bishop (May 8, 1931 – May 14, 1998) was an American professional football player who was a defensive lineman for 10 seasons in the National Football League (NFL).

A former United States Air Force member, he played college football for the North Texas State Eagles from 1949 to 1951. Much of his pro career was spent with the Chicago Bears; although he was selected 90th overall in the eighth round by the Pittsburgh Steelers in the 1952 NFL draft, he was traded to Chicago shortly after. He spent nine seasons with the Bears, remaining close with his teammates but frequently clashing with coach George Halas for salary reasons; in 1960, Bishop remarked, "Halas brainwashes you so much you don't want to play with anybody else; it's like playing for the New York Yankees." Bishop later became team captain of the inaugural Minnesota Vikings in 1961.

In the early 1970s, he coached the Winfield Giants Pop Warner team in Winfield, Illinois.
