= Charlie Sumner =

American football player and coach (1930–2015)

No. 26
- Position: Safety

Personal information
- Born: October 19, 1930; Radford, Virginia, U.S.
- Died: April 3, 2015 (aged 84); Maui, Hawaii, U.S.
- Listed height: 6 ft 1 in (1.85 m)
- Listed weight: 194 lb (88 kg)

Career information
- High school: Dublin (VA)
- College: William & Mary
- NFL draft: 1954: 22nd round, 258th overall pick

Career history

Playing
- Chicago Bears (1955–1960); Minnesota Vikings (1961–1962)

Coaching
- Oakland Raiders (1963–1968) Defensive backs coach; Pittsburgh Steelers (1969–1972) Defensive backs coach; New England Patriots (1973–1978) Defensive coordinator; Oakland/Los Angeles Raiders (1979–1984) Defensive coordinator; Oakland Invaders (1985) Head coach; Los Angeles Raiders (1986–1988) Defensive coordinator

Awards and highlights
- 2× Super Bowl champion (XV, XVIII)

Career NFL statistics
- Interceptions: 21
- Fumble recoveries: 8
- Total touchdowns: 1
- Stats at Pro Football Reference
- Coaching profile at Pro Football Reference

Charles Edward Sumner (October 19, 1930 – April 3, 2015) was an American professional football player who was selected 258th overall by the Chicago Bears in the 22nd round of the 1954 NFL draft. A 6'1", 194 lbs. safety from the College of William & Mary, Sumner played in eight National Football League (NFL) seasons, from 1955 to 1962. He later was an assistant coach in the NFL for many years, including three stints with the Oakland/Los Angeles Raiders.

Sumner's only head coaching stint was with the Oakland Invaders of the United States Football League (USFL) in 1985. That year, he led the Invaders, a club that featured future NFL stars Anthony Carter, Bobby Hebert, Ray Bentley and Gary Plummer, to the USFL Championship Game. The 1985 USFL Championship game was the last game the league ever played. The Invaders lost to the Baltimore Stars, 28–24, at Giants Stadium.

Sumner was born in Radford, Virginia. He was inducted into the Virginia Sports Hall of Fame in 2007. He died in Maui, Hawaii on April 6, 2015.
