= San Francisco 49ers =

NFL team in Santa Clara, California

- Current season
Logo	Wordmark
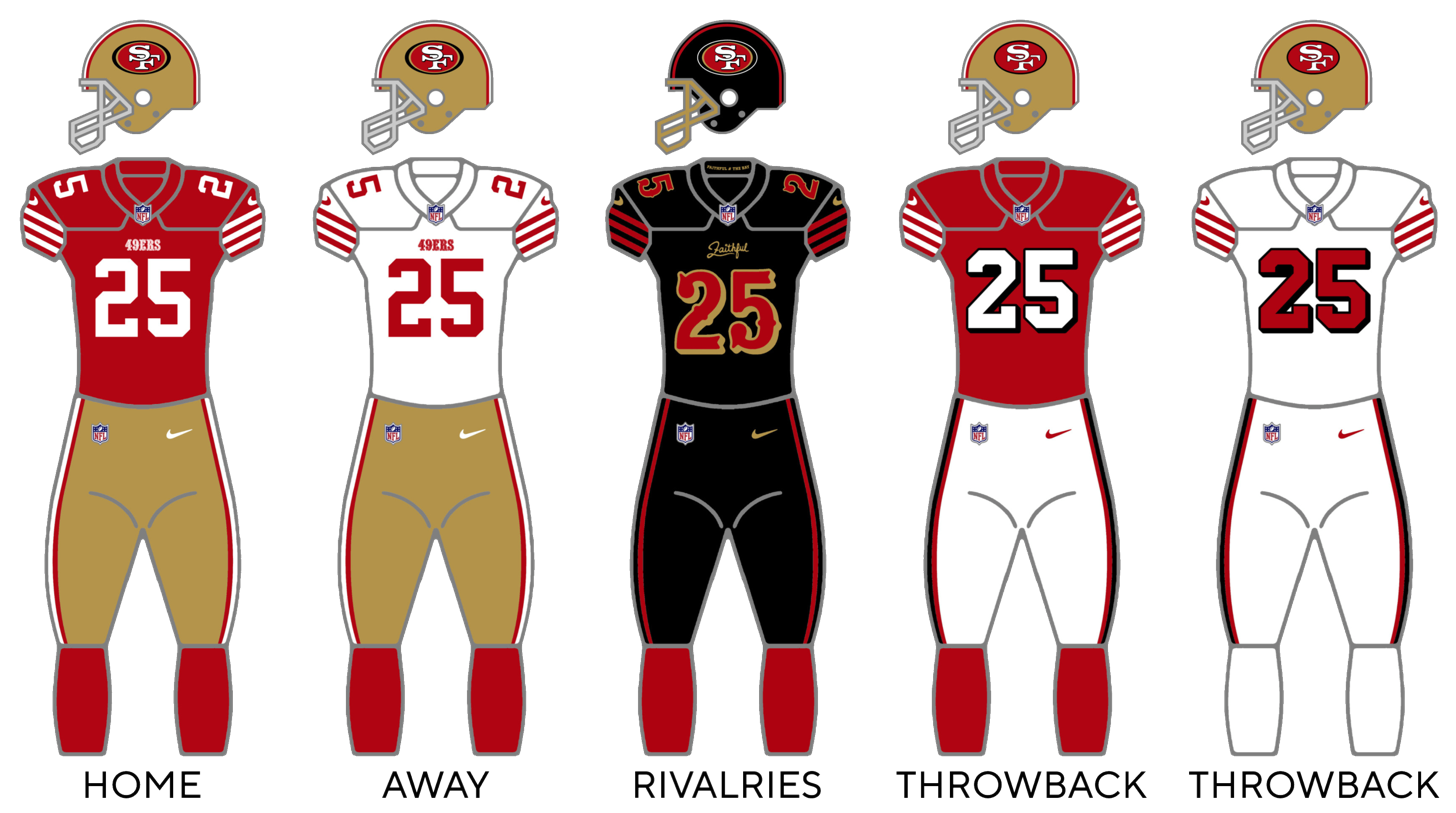
- Uniforms

General information
- Founded: June 4, 1944; 82 years ago
- Stadium: Levi's Stadium Santa Clara, California
- Headquartered: Santa Clara (Note: SAP Performance Facility)
- Colors: Red, gold
- Mascot: Sourdough Sam
- Website: 49ers.com

Personnel
- Owner: Jed York (Controlling)
- General manager: John Lynch
- Head coach: Kyle Shanahan
- President: Al Guido

Nickname
- Niners

Team history
- San Francisco 49ers (1946–present)

Home fields
- Kezar Stadium (1946–1970); Candlestick Park (1971–2013); Levi's Stadium (2014–present); Temporary stadiums 1989 due to the Loma Prieta earthquake: Stanford Stadium (one game); 2020 due to restrictions related to the COVID-19 pandemic in the San Francisco Bay Area: State Farm Stadium (three games)

League / conference affiliations
- All-America Football Conference (1946–1949): Western Division (1946–1948); National Football League (1950–present): National Conference (1950–1952); Western Conference (1953–1969); Coastal Division (1967–1969); National Football Conference (1970–present); NFC West (1970–present)

Championships
- Super Bowl championships: 5 1981 (XVI), 1984 (XIX), 1988 (XXIII), 1989 (XXIV), 1994 (XXIX)
- Conference championships: 8: NFC: 1981, 1984, 1988, 1989, 1994, 2012, 2019, 2023
- Division championships: 22: NFC West: 1970, 1971, 1972, 1981, 1983, 1984, 1986, 1987, 1988, 1989, 1990, 1992, 1993, 1994, 1995, 1997, 2002, 2011, 2012, 2019, 2022, 2023

Playoff appearances (31)
- AAFC: 1949; NFL: 1957, 1970, 1971, 1972, 1981, 1983, 1984, 1985, 1986, 1987, 1988, 1989, 1990, 1992, 1993, 1994, 1995, 1996, 1997, 1998, 2001, 2002, 2011, 2012, 2013, 2019, 2021, 2022, 2023, 2025

Owners
- Tony Morabito (1944–1957); Morabito estate (1957–1977); Edward J. DeBartolo Jr. (1977–2000); John and Denise DeBartolo York (2000–2024); Jed York (2024–present)

The San Francisco 49ers (also written as the San Francisco Forty-Niners and nicknamed the Niners) are a professional American football team based in the San Francisco Bay Area. The 49ers compete in the National Football League (NFL) as a member of the National Football Conference (NFC) West division. The team plays its home games at Levi's Stadium in Santa Clara, California, located 38 miles (61 km) southeast of San Francisco. The team is named after the prospectors of the California gold rush.

The team was founded in 1946 as a charter member of the All-America Football Conference (AAFC) and joined the NFL in 1949 when the leagues merged. The 49ers were the first major professional sports team based in San Francisco. They are the 10th-oldest franchise in the NFL, and have been owned and operated by Italian Americans (the Morabito and DeBartolo families) since their inception. The team played at Kezar Stadium in San Francisco before moving to Candlestick Park in 1971 and then to Levi's Stadium in 2014. Since 1988, the 49ers have been headquartered in Santa Clara.

The 49ers won five Super Bowl championships between 1981 and 1994. Four of those came in the 1980s, and were led by Hall of Famers Joe Montana, Jerry Rice, Ronnie Lott, Steve Young, Charles Haley, Fred Dean, and coaches Bill Walsh and George Seifert. They were division champions 22 times between 1970 and 2023, making them one of the most successful teams in NFL history. The 49ers are tied with the New England Patriots for most playoff wins (40) in NFL history, having been in the league playoffs 30 times (29 times in the NFL and one time in the AAFC), and have also played in the most NFC Championship Games (19), hosting 11 of them, also an NFC record. The team has set numerous NFL records, including most consecutive away games won (18), most consecutive seasons leading the league in scoring (4), most consecutive games scored (420 games from 1977 to 2004), most field goals in a season (44), most games won in a season (18), and most touchdowns (8) and points scored (55) in a Super Bowl.

In 2025, 9.2% of the franchise was sold to various groups in two separate transactions which valued the team at $8.5 billion, the largest valuation in NFL history. The stake was sold to several investors in Atherton and Menlo Park including 3.1% to the family of Vinod Khosla and 3.2% to Pete Briger Jr. of Fortress Investment Group.

In June 2023, the enterprise branch of the 49ers bought English soccer club Leeds United; in May 2025, it acquired 51% of Scottish soccer club Rangers F.C.

== History ==
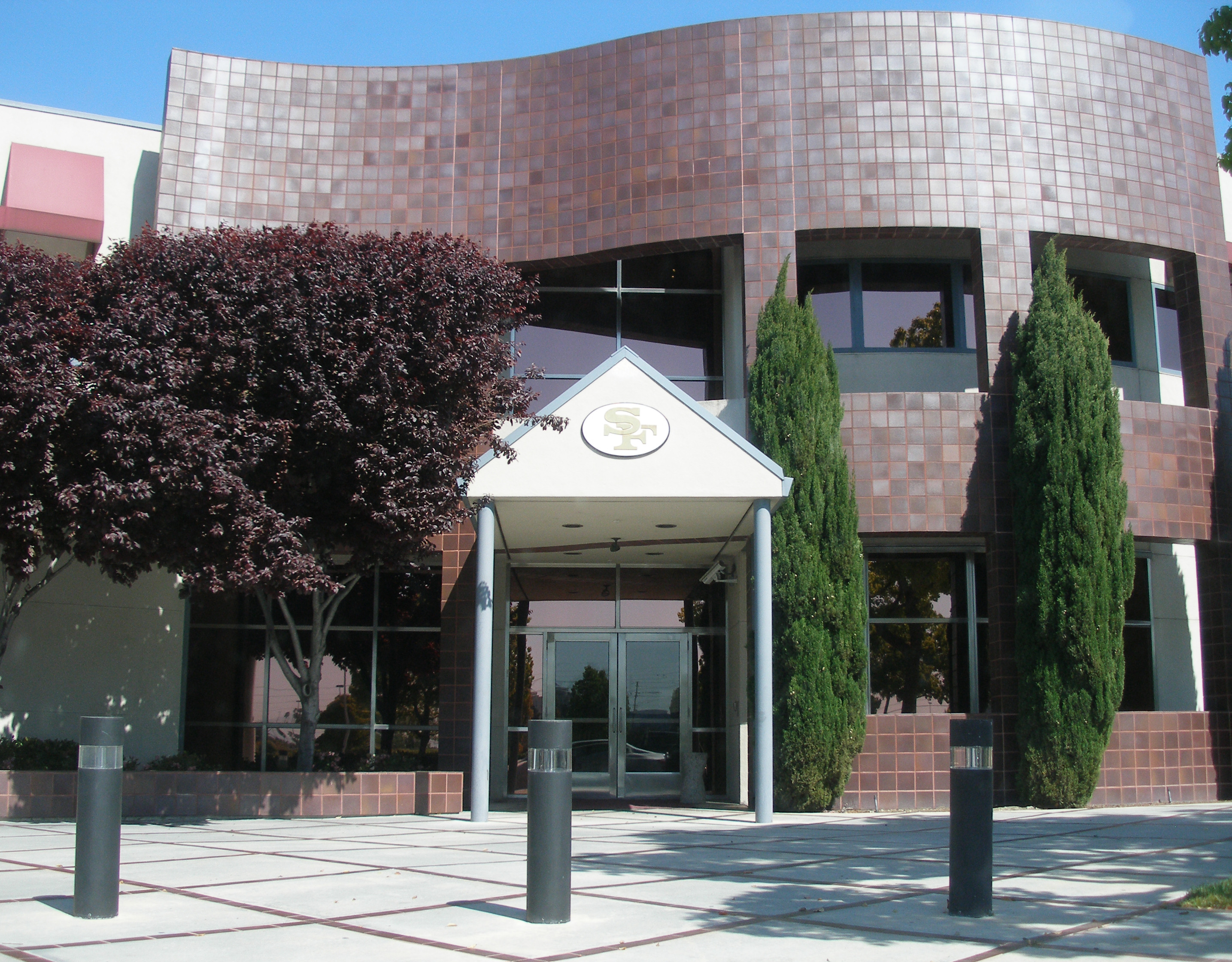
49ers team headquarters in Santa Clara, California

=== Morabito family era (1946–1976) ===
==== Buck Shaw years (1946–1954) ====
The San Francisco 49ers, an original member of the new All-America Football Conference (AAFC), were the first major league professional sports franchise based in San Francisco, and one of the first major league professional sports teams based on the Pacific Coast. In 1946, the team joined the Los Angeles Dons of the AAFC and the Los Angeles Rams of the rival National Football League as the first three teams playing a "big four"-sport in the Western United States, eventually becoming part of the NFL themselves in 1950.

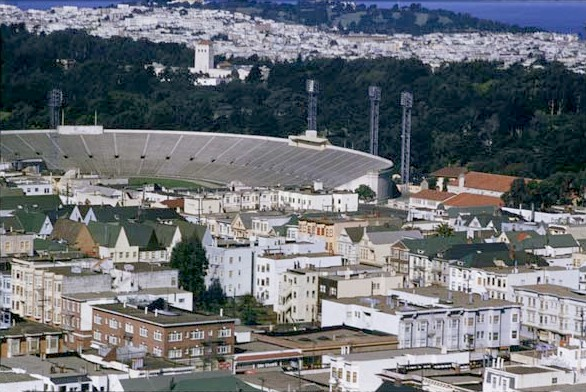
Kezar Stadium was the team's home venue from 1946 to 1970.

In 1957, the 49ers enjoyed their first sustained success as members of the NFL. After losing the opening game of the season, the 49ers won their next three against the Rams, Bears, and Packers before returning home to Kezar Stadium for a game against the Chicago Bears on October 27, 1957. The 49ers fell behind the Bears 17–7. 49ers owner Tony Morabito (1910–1957) collapsed of a heart attack and died during the game. The 49ers players learned of his death at halftime when coach Frankie Albert was handed a note with two words: "Tony's gone". The 49ers scored 14 unanswered points to win the game, 21–17. Dicky Moegle's late-game interception in the end zone sealed the victory. After Tony's death, 49er ownership went to Victor Morabito (1919–1964) and Tony's widow, Josephine V. Morabito (1910–1995). The 49ers' special assistant to the Morabitos, Louis G. Spadia (1921–2013) was named general manager.

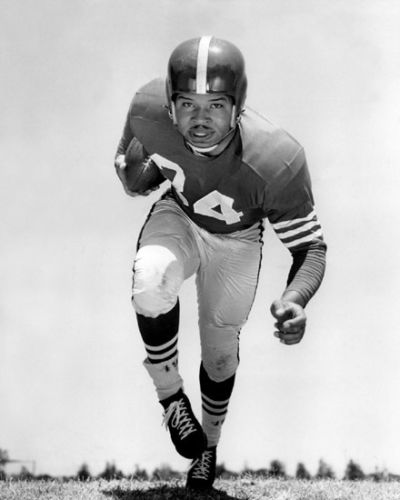
Joe Perry played for the 49ers for 14 seasons.

During the decade of the 1950s, the 49ers were known for their so-called "Million Dollar Backfield", consisting of four future Hall of Fame members: quarterback Y. A. Tittle and running backs John Henry Johnson, Hugh McElhenny, and Joe Perry. They became the only full-house backfield inducted into the Pro Football Hall of Fame.

For most of the next 13 years, the 49ers hovered around .490, except for 1963 and 1964 when they went 2–12 and 4–10, respectively. Key players for these 49ers included running back Ken Willard, quarterback John Brodie, and offensive lineman Bruce Bosley. During this time the 49ers became the first NFL team to use the shotgun formation. It was named by the man who devised the formation, San Francisco 49ers' coach Red Hickey, in 1960. The formation, where the quarterback lines up seven yards behind the center, was designed to allow the quarterback extra time to throw. The formation was used for the first time in 1960 and enabled the 49ers to beat the Baltimore Colts, who were not familiar with the formation.

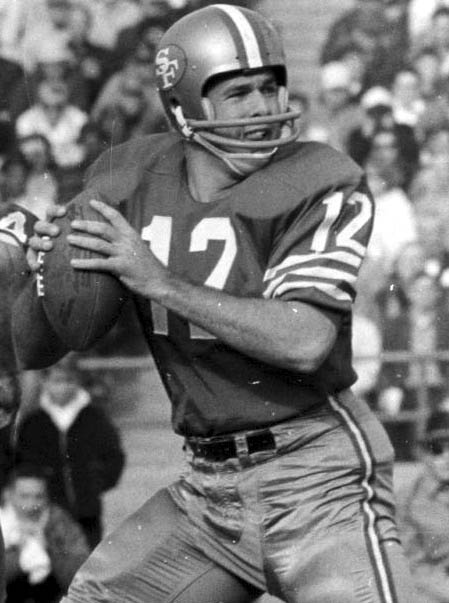
John Brodie was the 49ers' quarterback during the 1960s

In 1961, primarily using the shotgun, the 49ers got off to a fast 4–1 start, including two shutouts in back-to-back weeks. In their sixth game they faced the Chicago Bears, who by moving players closer to the line of scrimmage and rushing the quarterback, were able to defeat the shotgun and in fact shut out the 49ers, 31–0. Though the 49ers went only 3–5–1 the rest of the way, the shotgun eventually became a component of most team's offenses and is a formation used by football teams at all levels. In 1962, the 49ers had a frustrating season as they won only 6 games that year. They won only one game at Kezar Stadium while on the road they won five of seven games. After posting a losing record in 1963. Victor Morabito died May 10, 1964, at age 45. The 1964 season was another lost campaign. According to the 1965 49ers Yearbook, the co-owners of the team were: Mrs. Josephine V. Morabito Fox, Mrs. Jane Morabito, Mrs. O.H. Heintzelman, Lawrence J. Purcell, Mrs. William O'Grady, Albert J. Ruffo, Franklin Mieuli, Frankie Albert, Louis G. Spadia and James Ginella. The 1965 49ers rebounded nicely to finish with a 7–6–1 record. They were led that year by John Brodie, who after being plagued by injuries came back to become one of the NFL's best passers by throwing for 3,112 yards and 30 touchdowns. In 1966, the Morabito widows named Lou Spadia team president.

==== Dick Nolan years (1968–1975) ====
For the 1968 season, the 49ers hired Dick Nolan, who had been Tom Landry's defensive coordinator with the Dallas Cowboys, as their head coach. Nolan's first two seasons with the 49ers had gone much the same as the previous decade, with the 49ers going 7–6–1 and 4–8–2.

The 49ers started out the 1970 season 7–1–1, with their only loss a one-point defeat to Atlanta. After losses to Detroit and Los Angeles, the 49ers won their next two games before the season finale against the Oakland Raiders. Going into the game, the 49ers had a half-game lead on the Rams and needed either a win or a Giants victory against the Rams in their finale to give the 49ers their first-ever divisional title.

In the early game, the Giants lost to the Rams 31–3, thus forcing the 49ers to win their game to clinch the division. In wet, rainy conditions in Oakland, the 49ers won against the Raiders, 38–7, giving the 49ers their first divisional title, which made them champions of the NFC West. The 49ers won their divisional playoff game 17–14 against the defending conference champion Minnesota Vikings, thus setting up a matchup against the Dallas Cowboys for the NFC Championship. In the final home game for the 49ers at Kezar Stadium, the 49ers kept up with the Cowboys before losing 17–10, which resulted in the Cowboys going to Super Bowl V. The 49ers sent five players to the Pro Bowl that season, including MVP veteran quarterback John Brodie, wide receiver Gene Washington, and linebacker Dave Wilcox. Nolan was also named NFL Coach of the Year for 1970. Following the 1970 season, the 49ers moved from Kezar Stadium to Candlestick Park. Despite being located on the outskirts of the city, Candlestick Park gave the 49ers a much more modern facility with more amenities that was easier for fans to access by highway.

The 49ers won their second straight divisional title in 1971 with a 9–5 record. The 49ers again won their divisional playoff game, this time against the Washington Redskins, by 24–20. This set up a rematch against the Dallas Cowboys in the NFC Championship Game, this time played in Dallas. Though the defense again held the Cowboys in check, the 49ers offense was ineffective, and the eventual Super Bowl champion Cowboys beat the 49ers again, 14–3. In 1971, eight 49ers made the Pro Bowl, including defensive back Jimmy Johnson and Gene Washington, both for the second year in a row, as well as defensive end Cedric Hardman, running back Vic Washington, and offensive lineman Forrest Blue.

The 49ers won their third consecutive NFC West title in 1972 with five wins in their last six games, making them the only franchise to win their first three divisional titles after the 1970 AFL–NFL merger. Their opponents in the divisional playoffs were the Dallas Cowboys, making it the third consecutive year the teams faced each other in the playoffs. Vic Washington took the opening kickoff 97 yards for a score, and the 49ers took a 21–6 lead in the second quarter. After the 49ers took a 28–13 lead in the fourth quarter, Tom Landry sent quarterback Roger Staubach, who was backing up Craig Morton, into the game. Staubach quickly led the Cowboys on a drive to a field goal, bringing the score to within 28–16, and as the game wound down it appeared that this would be the last points the Cowboys would get. However, Dallas completed the comeback in the last two minutes. Just after the two-minute warning, Staubach took just four plays to drive 55 yards in only 32 seconds, hitting Billy Parks on a twenty-yard touchdown pass to bring the score to 28–23. Cowboys kicker Toni Fritsch then executed a successful onside kick that was recovered by Mel Renfro, giving the Cowboys the ball at midfield with 1:20 left on the clock. With the 49ers on the ropes, Staubach scrambled for 21 yards, then completed a 19-yard sideline pass to Billy Parks who went out of bounds at the 10-yard line to stop the clock. Staubach then completed the comeback with a 10-yard touchdown pass to Ron Sellers with only 52 seconds left, giving the Cowboys a dramatic 30–28 victory; it was the third straight season the Cowboys had defeated the 49ers in the postseason. It would also be their last postseason appearance for nine years.

The 49ers run at the top of the NFC West ended in 1973 with the 49ers falling to a 5–9 record, their worst since 1969. The team lost six of its last eight games, including games to the also-ran New Orleans Saints and Detroit Lions. In the final season of his career, longtime 49ers quarterback John Brodie split playing time with two other quarterbacks, most notably longtime backup Steve Spurrier. The team also suffered from not having a dominant running back, with Vic Washington leading the team with only 534 yards rushing.

In 1974, the 49ers drafted Wilbur Jackson from the University of Alabama to be the team's primary back. Jackson enjoyed a fine rookie year, leading the 49ers with 705 yards rushing. He and fellow running back Larry Schreiber combined for over 1,300 yards rushing. With Steve Spurrier injured and missing nearly the entire year, the 49ers did not have a regular quarterback but did put together a respectable 6–8 record. Following the season, longtime tight end Ted Kwalick left the 49ers to join the World Football League, then the Oakland Raiders upon the WFL's dissolution.

The 49ers dropped to 5–9 in what would be Dick Nolan's final season as coach in 1975, losing their final four games of the season. Wilbur Jackson was hurt much of the year and Delvin Williams led the 49ers in rushing with 631 yards rushing. Following the 1975 season the 49ers traded for New England Patriots quarterback Jim Plunkett, former Heisman Trophy winner from nearby Stanford University (which was also the alma mater of John Brodie). Though Plunkett had shown promise with the Patriots, he had not won there, and it was thought that he needed a change of scenery. Monte Clark was also brought on as 49ers head coach.

The 49ers featured one of the best running games in the NFL in 1976. Delvin Williams emerged as an elite back, gaining over 1,200 yards rushing and made the Pro Bowl. Wilbur Jackson also enjoyed a resurgence, rushing for 792 yards. Once again Gene Washington was the team's leading receiver with 457 yards receiving and six scores. The 49ers started the season 6–1 for their best start since 1970. Most of the wins were against second-tier teams, although the 49ers did shut out the Rams 16–0, in Los Angeles on Monday Night Football. In that game the 49ers recorded 10 sacks, including 6 by Tommy Hart. However, the 49ers lost four games in a row, including two against divisional rivals Los Angeles and Atlanta that proved fatal to their playoff hopes.

=== Edward DeBartolo era (1977–1999) ===
Lou Spadia retired from the 49ers in 1977 upon the team's sale to the DeBartolo Family. The team was sold to Edward J. DeBartolo Jr. in March 1977, and despite finishing the season with a winning record of 8–6, Clark was fired after just one season by newly hired general manager Joe Thomas, who oversaw the worst stretch of football in the team's history.

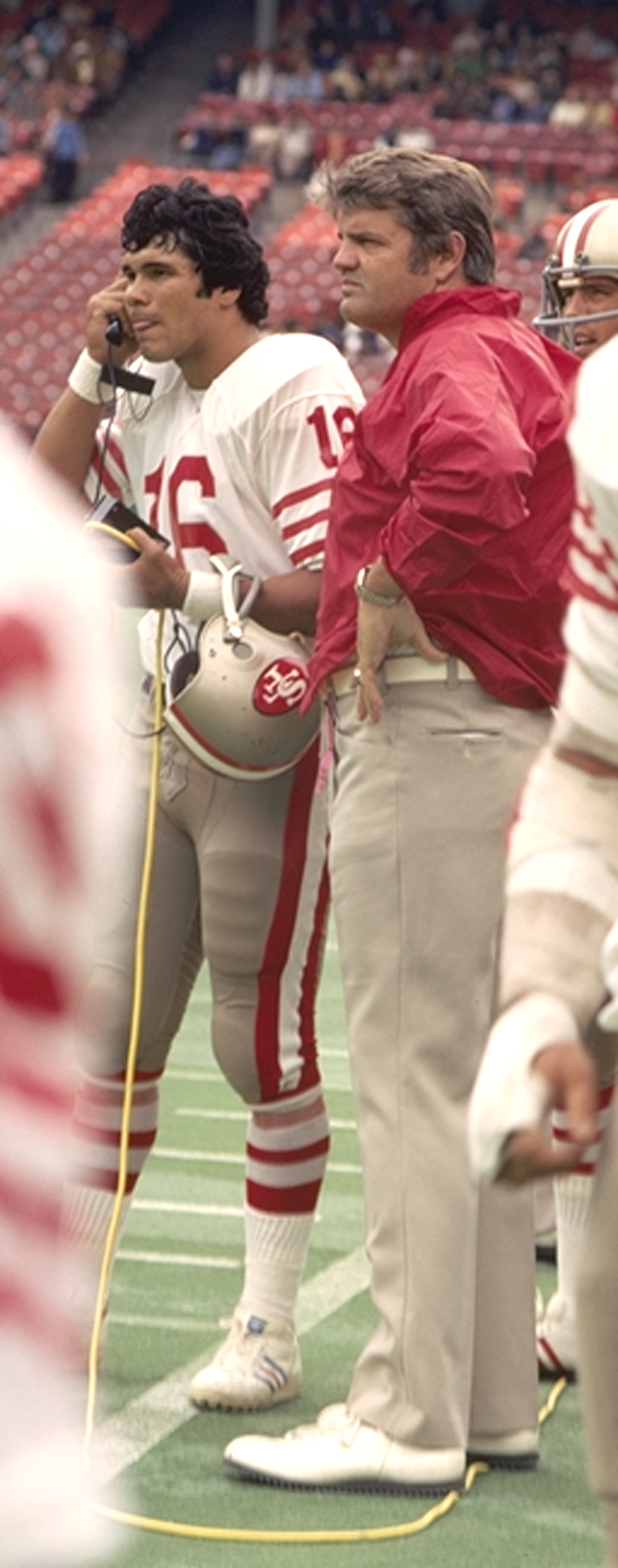
Coach Monte Clark and quarterback Jim Plunkett on the sideline during the 1976 season

Under coach Ken Meyer the 49ers lost their first five games of the 1977 season, including being shut out twice. Though they won five of their next six, they lost their last three games to finish the season 5–9. Playing in San Francisco did not revive Plunkett's career as he had another disappointing season, throwing only 9 touchdown passes. Bright spots for the 49ers included defensive linemen Tommy Hart and Cleveland Elam, who made the Pro Bowl, and running backs Wilbur Jackson and Delvin Williams, who combined for over 1,600 yards rushing. Gene Washington again led the team in receiving in 1977, his final year with the 49ers. The 1977 offseason was marked by a number of questionable moves by Joe Thomas that backfired badly. Thomas's big offseason acquisition was running back O. J. Simpson from the Buffalo Bills. As with Plunkett two years previously, it was thought that rescuing Simpson from a bad situation and bringing him to the west coast where he had been raised would rejuvenate his career. To create playing time for Simpson, Thomas traded Delvin Williams to the Miami Dolphins for wide receiver Freddie Solomon. Thomas also released Jim Plunkett, giving up on him after two seasons. Finally, Thomas fired Meyer after only one season, and replaced him with Pete McCulley, his third coach in three seasons.

The 1978 season was a disaster for the 49ers, as they finished 2–14, their only wins coming against the Cincinnati Bengals and Tampa Bay Buccaneers. Simpson indeed led the team in rushing, but with less than 600 yards. It became apparent that Simpson's knees and body were worn out, and he was near the end of his career. Wilbur Jackson also missed the entire season due to injury. Even worse for the franchise was that their first pick of the 1979 draft was traded to the Bills as part of the O. J. Simpson deal. Joe Thomas was fired following the season. Some of the key players that became part of the 49ers stunning rise began their 49ers career in 1978. Rookie quarterback Steve DeBerg, Joe Montana's first mentor, was the 49ers' starting quarterback. Running back Paul Hofer and center/guard Randy Cross also started with the 49ers in 1978.

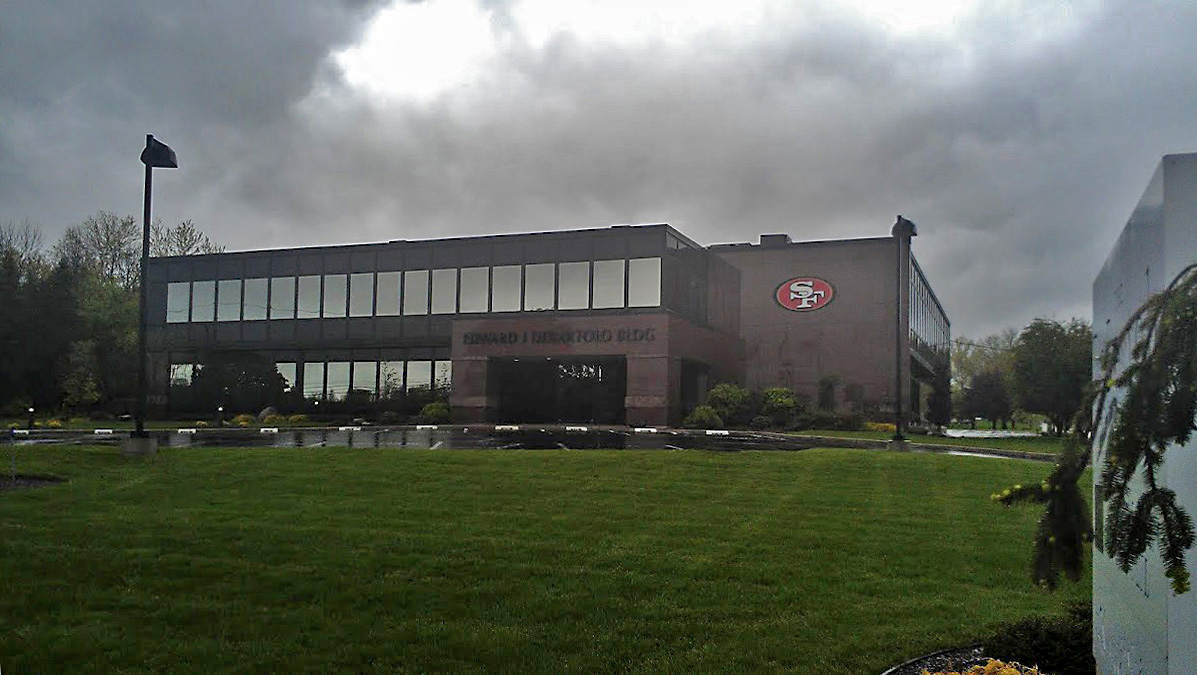
The headquarters of The DeBartolo Corporation in Boardman, Ohio, with the 49ers logo on the building, signifying the team's ownership by the Youngstown-based DeBartolo-York family

The team was led in its turnaround from late 1970s doormat by new owner Edward J. DeBartolo Jr. and head coach Bill Walsh. The former head coach of Stanford University was known for stockpiling draft picks, making excellent draft selections, and patching roster holes by acquiring key free agents.

==== Bill Walsh years (1979–1988) ====
Bill Walsh was hired to be the 49ers head coach in the 1978 off-season. Walsh was a disciple of Paul Brown, and served as Brown's offensive coordinator with the Cincinnati Bengals from 1968 to 1975. However, Brown did not appoint him as his successor upon his retirement, choosing another assistant, former 49ers center Bill "Tiger" Johnson. Walsh was hired by Stanford University in 1977. He went 17–7 in two seasons for the Cardinal before being hired by the 49ers in 1979.

Walsh is given credit for popularizing the 'West Coast offense'. The Bill Walsh offense was actually created and refined while he was an assistant coach with the Bengals. The offense utilizes a short, precise, timed passing game as a replacement/augmentation of the running game. The offense is extremely difficult to defend against as it is content to consistently make 6–8-yard gains all the way down the field. (The other West Coast offense—more focused on the vertical, or downfield, passing game—was actually created by 1960s L.A. / San Diego coach Sid Gillman, and San Diego State coach Don Coryell, who also employed a version of it as head coach of the St. Louis (football) Cardinals and San Diego Chargers during a period where it garnered the nickname "Air Coryell".)

In Walsh's first draft, the 49ers had targeted Notre Dame quarterback Joe Montana as an early-round pick. Montana had enjoyed a storied college career, leading the Fighting Irish to the 1977 national title and a number of dramatic comeback victories, the most stunning of all being his final game, at the 1979 Cotton Bowl Classic. Playing the University of Houston in an ice storm, and with Montana suffering from a bad flu, Notre Dame was down 34–10 in the third quarter. However, Montana led a magnificent rally that culminated with him throwing a touchdown pass on the game's final play to give Notre Dame the 35–34 win.

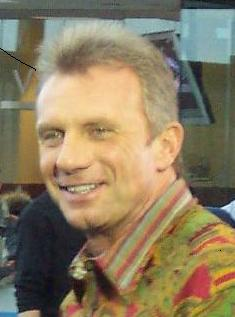
Joe Montana in 2006

Despite this, most scouts did not peg Montana as a top prospect. Although 6'2" and 190–200 lbs., Montana's arm strength was considered suspect as was the consistency of his play. Although he did get his share of the credit, most thought of him as a system player surrounded by a great team.

In the 1979 draft, the Dallas Cowboys were placed just ahead of the 49ers. The Cowboys' draft strategy through that time was to take the highest-ranked player on their draft board at the time of their selection, regardless of position. When the Cowboys' turn came up in the third round, the highest-rated player on their board was Montana. However, feeling that the quarterback position was in excellent long-term shape with Roger Staubach and Danny White, and desperately needing a tight end, the Cowboys went off their strategy and drafted Doug Cosbie. The 49ers took Montana. The 49ers' other notable draft choice of the 1979 draft was wide receiver Dwight Clark in the 10th round. Walsh discovered the unheralded Clark while scouting quarterback Steve Fuller of Clemson University as Clark ran routes for Fuller during Walsh's evaluation of the quarterback. Walsh's serendipitous discovery of Clark proved to be an early glimpse into his philosophy for picking talent.

As Walsh implemented his strategies and game plan, the 49ers had another year of losing, finishing 2–14 like the previous season. There were, however, a number of bright spots. Despite throwing more interceptions (21) than touchdowns (17), Steve DeBerg blossomed under Walsh, throwing for over 3,600 yards and completing 60% of his passes. Freddie Solomon also had a good year, with over 800 yards receiving. The running game was patchwork, with Paul Hofer leading the team with 615 yards and O. J. Simpson, in his final season, rushing for only 460 yards and being sidelined with injuries. The 49ers got off to a strong start in 1980, winning their first three games of the season. However, the team, still maturing, lost their next eight games in a row. Many of those games though were close, and the 49ers acquitted themselves well. During the season Walsh alternated DeBerg and Montana at quarterback. Though DeBerg had played well for the 49ers, Walsh felt the team's best chance to win in the long run was with Montana. He alternated the two quarterbacks, giving Montana some experience while keeping opponents off guard. This strategy of alternating quarterbacks from game to game and during games is rare in football, although it had been employed by other successful teams in the past, specifically the Dallas Cowboys of the early 1970s who alternated Roger Staubach and Craig Morton, and the Los Angeles Rams of the late 1940s alternating Norm Van Brocklin and Bob Waterfield.

In all DeBerg started nine games, going 4–5 with 1,998 yards, 12 touchdowns and 17 interceptions. Montana started seven games, going 2–5 with 1,795 yards, 15 touchdowns, and nine picks; Montana also had a better completion percentage at 64.5 to DeBerg's 57.9.

The highlight of the 1980 season, and a sign of good things to come, came in Week 14. The 49ers trailed the New Orleans Saints, who at the time were winless at 0–13, 35–7 at halftime. However, led by Joe Montana, the 49ers made (what was then) possibly the greatest comeback in NFL history, coming back to tie the score in regulation and winning the game in overtime with a field goal by Ray Wersching to give the 49ers an incredible 38–35 victory. It was this game, which marked Montana's first big NFL comeback win, that won Montana the quarterback job full-time. A number of key players emerged for the 49ers in 1980. Among them were Dwight Clark, who led the 49ers with 82 receptions and just under 1,000 yards receiving, and running back Earl Cooper, who ran for over 700 yards.

===== Super Bowl XVI champions (1981) =====
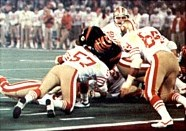
Head coach Bill Walsh led the 49ers to their first NFL championship, defeating the Bengals 26–21 in Super Bowl XVI.

With the offense playing well consistently, Walsh and the 49ers focused on overhauling the defense in 1981. Walsh took the highly unusual step of overhauling his entire secondary with rookies and untested players, bringing on board Ronnie Lott, Eric Wright and Carlton Williamson and giving Dwight Hicks a prominent role. He also acquired veteran linebacker Jack "Hacksaw" Reynolds and veteran defensive end and sack specialist Fred Dean. These additions, when added to existing defensive mainstays like Keena Turner, turned the 49ers into an offensively and defensively balanced, dominant team. After a 1–2 start, the 49ers won all but one of their remaining games to finish with a 13–3 record; at this time, it was the team's best regular-season win–loss record. Dean made the Pro Bowl, as did Lott and Hicks. Led by Montana, the unusual offense was centered on the short passing game, which Walsh used as ball control. Dwight Clark and Freddie Solomon had excellent years receiving; Clark as the possession receiver, and Solomon as more of a deep threat. The 49ers' running game, however, was among the weakest in the league. Ricky Patton led the 49ers with only 543 yards rushing. The 49ers' most valuable running back, however, might have been Earl Cooper, whose strength was as a pass catching back. The 49ers faced the New York Giants in the divisional playoffs and won, 38–24. This set up an NFC Championship Game matchup with the Dallas Cowboys, whom the 49ers historically could not beat during their playoff runs in the early 1970s. The 49ers played tough, but the Cowboys forced six turnovers and held the lead late. The 49ers were down 27–21 and on their own 11-yard line with 4:54 remaining. As Montana had done for Notre Dame and the 49ers so many times, he led the 49ers on a sustained final 89-yard drive to the Cowboys' 6-yard line. On a 3rd-and-3 play, with his primary receiver covered, Montana rolled right and threw the ball off balance to Dwight Clark, who leaped in the end zone and caught the ball to tie the game at 27 ("The Catch"), with the extra point giving the 49ers the lead. The Cowboys had one last chance to win. On the first play of the next possession, Cowboys receiver Drew Pearson caught a pass from Danny White and reached midfield before he was pulled down by the jersey at the 49ers' 44-yard line by cornerback Eric Wright, who prevented a winning touchdown. On the next play, White was sacked by Lawrence Pillers and fumbled the ball, which was recovered by Jim Stuckey, giving the 49ers the win and a trip to their first-ever Super Bowl, against the Cincinnati Bengals, who were also in their first Super Bowl. In Super Bowl XVI, the 49ers took a 20–0 halftime lead and held on to win 26–21 behind kicker Ray Wersching's four field goals and a key defensive stand. In the '81 season, the defense had been a significant reason for the team's success, despite being overshadowed by the then-innovative offense. Montana won MVP honors mostly on the strength of leading the 49ers on a 92-yard, 12-play drive culminating in a touchdown pass to Earl Cooper. The 49ers completed one of the most dramatic and complete turnarounds in NFL history, going from a 2–14 season and a 6–10 season to a Super Bowl championship.

The 1982 season was a retrogression; the team lost all five games at Candlestick Park en route to a 3–6 record in a strike-shortened season. This year was the 49ers' last losing season for the next 17 years. Joe Montana was the one highlight, passing for 2,613 yards in just nine games, highlighted by five straight games in which he broke the 300-yard barrier.

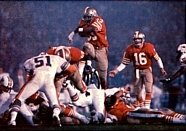
Roger Craig (middle) and Joe Montana (right) led the 49ers to their second Super Bowl victory (XIX) in four seasons.

In 1983, the 49ers won their final three games and finished 10–6, winning their second NFC Western Divisional Title in three years. Leading the rebound was Joe Montana with another stellar season; he passed for 3,910 yards and 26 touchdowns. In the NFC Divisional Playoffs, the 49ers hosted the Detroit Lions. The 49ers jumped in front early and led 17–9 entering the 4th quarter, but the Lions roared back, scoring two touchdowns to take a 23–17 lead. However, Montana led a comeback, hitting wide receiver Freddie Solomon on a game-winning 14-yard touchdown pass with 2:00 on the clock and putting the 49ers ahead 24–23. The game ended when Lions placekicker Eddie Murray missed a game-winning FG attempt. The next week, the 49ers came back from a 21–0 deficit against the Washington Redskins in the NFC Championship Game to tie the game, before controversial penalties and a late Mark Moseley field goal sent the Redskins to a 24–21 victory and Super Bowl XVIII.

===== Super Bowl XIX champions (1984) =====
In 1984, the 49ers had one of the greatest seasons in team history by finishing the regular season 15–1, setting the record for most regular-season wins that was later equaled by the 1985 Chicago Bears, the 1998 Minnesota Vikings, the 2004 Pittsburgh Steelers, the 2011 Green Bay Packers and finally broken by the 2007 New England Patriots (with 16 regular-season victories). Their 18 wins overall is also still a record, tied by the 1985 Bears and the 2007 New England Patriots (who won 18 straight, but lost Super Bowl XLII to the New York Giants). The 49ers' only defeat in the 1984 season was a 20–17 loss to the Steelers; a late field goal attempt in that game by San Francisco kicker Ray Wersching went off the uprights and was no good. In the playoffs, they beat the New York Giants 21–10, shut out the Chicago Bears 23–0 in the NFC Championship, and in Super Bowl XIX the 49ers shut down a record-setting year by NFL MVP Dan Marino (and his speedy receivers Mark Clayton and Mark Duper), beating the Miami Dolphins 38–16. Their entire defensive backfield (Ronnie Lott, Eric Wright, Dwight Hicks, and Carlton Williamson) was elected to the Pro Bowl—an NFL first.

In the 1985 NFL draft, the team received the 28th overall pick after winning the Super Bowl the previous year. On draft day, the 49ers traded its first two picks for New England's first-round choice, the 16th selection overall (the teams also swapped third-round picks as part of the deal), and selected Jerry Rice from Mississippi Valley State. It was reported that the Dallas Cowboys, who had the 17th selection overall, were intending to pick him. In the 1985 season, the 49ers were not as dominant as in 1984, finishing the regular season with a 10–6 record and a wild card berth. Jerry Rice struggled at times (dropping numerous passes), but he still impressed the NFL in his rookie season for the 49ers in 1985, especially after a 10-catch, 241-yard game against the Los Angeles Rams in December. Rice was named NFC Offensive Rookie of the Year after recording 49 catches for 927 yards, and averaging 19.9 yards per catch, Roger Craig became the first NFL player to gain 1,000 yards rushing and 1,000 yards receiving in the same season. In the 1985 playoffs, the 49ers were quickly eliminated from the playoffs by the New York Giants 17–3.

In the 1986 NFL season, the 49ers got off to a quick start after a 31–7 win over the Tampa Bay Buccaneers on opening day. But the win was costly; Joe Montana injured his back and was out for two months, the injury was to a spinal disc in Montana's lower back and required immediate surgery. The injury was so severe that Montana's doctors suggested that Montana retire. On September 15, 1986, the 49ers placed Montana on the injured reserve list, Jeff Kemp became the starting quarterback, and the 49ers went 4–3–1 in September and October.

Montana returned to the team on November 6 of that year. In his first game back from injury, Montana passed for 270 yards and three touchdown passes in a 43–17 49er victory against the St. Louis Cardinals. The 49ers caught fire, winning the next 5 of the final 7 games, including a 24–14 win over the Los Angeles Rams, to clinch the NFC West title. Jerry Rice continued to show improvement from the previous season catching 86 passes for a league-leading 1,570 yards and 15 touchdowns. Montana was co-recipient of the 1986 NFL Comeback Player of the Year Award, which he shared with Vikings quarterback Tommy Kramer. However, the New York Giants would defeat the 49ers again in the playoffs, 49–3 in the team's worst post-season loss to date. Montana was again injured in the first half by a hit from the Giants' Jim Burt.

In the off-season, Bill Walsh was concerned about Montana's health going forward, and with no reliable back-up at quarterback he completed a trade for Steve Young, then a quarterback with the Tampa Bay Buccaneers. During the strike-shortened 1987 season, the 49ers became one of the NFL's elite teams once again with a league-best 13–2 record. Joe Montana had a bounce-back year after his injuries the previous year and being questioned by the media if he could still produce at a high level, by throwing 31 touchdown passes, a career-high. He also set the NFL record for most consecutive pass attempts without an incomplete pass (22), passed for 3,054 yards, and had a passer rating of 102.1. Rice had established himself as an elite receiver, he caught 65 passes for 1,078 yards and a then NFL-record 22 touchdowns in just 12 games. 1987 was the second of six seasons in which Rice would lead the NFL in receiving or touchdown receptions, he was named Offensive Player of the Year. By the end of the regular season the 49ers were ranked No. 1 on both offense and defense and were heavy favorites to win the Super Bowl. However, they were stunned in the NFC divisional round, losing 36–24 to what was believed to be an inferior Minnesota Vikings team, their third straight playoff loss. Joe Montana had one of the worst post-season games of his career and was eventually benched during the game in favor of Steve Young, who scored a rushing touchdown and threw another. After the game, owner Eddie DeBartolo stripped Walsh of the team president title. Dwight Clark retired that off-season.

===== Super Bowl XXIII champions (1988) =====
During the off-season, a quarterback controversy between Joe Montana and Steve Young had begun after Montana's poor performance in the playoffs the previous year. Many speculated that the 1988 season would be his last year with the team. In the 1988 NFL season, the 49ers struggled to start the season; Walsh would constantly switch QBs between Montana (who suffered an elbow injury week 1 that would linger for most of the season) and Young. At one point, they were 6–5 and the team was in danger of missing the playoffs. Before week 11, Ronnie Lott called a players-only meeting; after the meeting, the team came together and defeated the defending Super Bowl champion Washington Redskins in a Monday night game, Montana had fully recovered from his injury and retook the starting quarterback job as the team eventually finished the season at 10–6. They gained a measure of revenge by routing the Minnesota Vikings 34–9 in the divisional playoffs. The 49ers then traveled to Chicago's Soldier Field for the NFC Championship against the Chicago Bears, where the wind chill factor at game time was −26°. However, despite the weather, Joe Montana picked apart the Bears' top-rated defense by scoring three touchdowns as the 49ers dominated the Bears with a 28–3 victory, earning the team's third trip to the Super Bowl, to go against the Cincinnati Bengals.

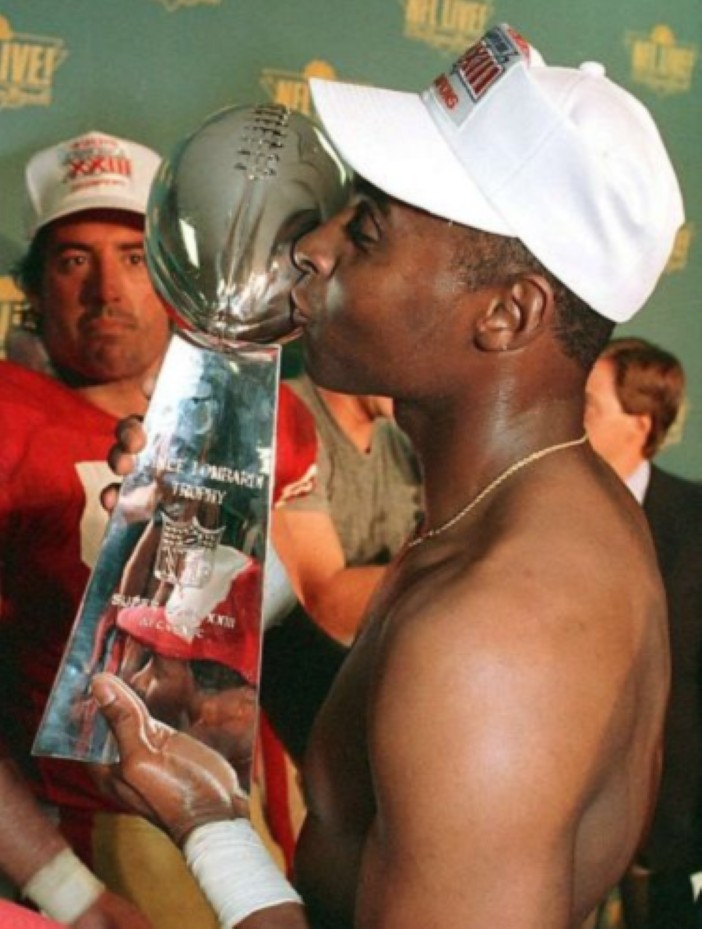
Jerry Rice holds the Vince Lombardi Trophy following the 49ers' victory in Super Bowl XXIII

In Super Bowl XXIII, despite numerous trips deep into Cincinnati territory by the 49ers, the game was tied 3–3 at halftime. Early in the fourth quarter, Montana tied the score at 13; however, Cincinnati regained the lead on a Jim Breech field goal to put the Bengals ahead 16–13 with just over three minutes left on the clock. Following the kickoff, and a holding penalty, the 49ers took over on their 8-yard line with 3:08 left on the clock. Joe Montana began the final drive by stepping into the huddle and remarking to offensive tackle Harris Barton, during a television timeout, "hey, there's John Candy", as he pointed to the stands on the other side of the field. His calm demeanor reassured the 49ers, and he then engineered what some consider the greatest drive in Super Bowl history, as he drove the team 92 yards for the winning touchdown on a pass to John Taylor with only 34 seconds left, as they captured their third Super Bowl championship with a score of 20–16. Jerry Rice was named Super Bowl MVP.

==== George Seifert years (1989–1996) ====
After Super Bowl XXIII, Bill Walsh retired as head coach; his defensive coordinator and handpicked successor, George Seifert, took over as head coach.

===== Super Bowl XXIV champions (1989) =====
In the 1989 NFL season, Joe Montana threw for 3,521 yards and 26 touchdowns, with only 8 interceptions, giving him a 112.4 quarterback rating, which was then the highest single-season passer rating in NFL history, and was named NFL Most Valuable Player. Jerry Rice, in his fifth year in the league, continued to dominate; he led the league with almost 1,490 receiving yards, and 17 touchdowns. The 49ers clinched their fourth straight division title, beating the Los Angeles Rams 30–27 after a dramatic second-half comeback; they finished 14–2, gaining home-field advantage throughout the playoffs. Their two losses were by a combined five points.

In the divisional playoffs, they easily defeated the Vikings, 41–13. In the NFC Championship Game, they played against the Rams for a third time; the previous two games had been decided by a total of 4 points, but they were able to blow out the Rams 30–3, earning another trip to the Super Bowl, where they defeated the Denver Broncos in relatively easy fashion by a score of 55–10 in Super Bowl XXIV – setting a record for points scored and widest margin of victory in a Super Bowl. Montana himself set many Super Bowl records (some since tied or surpassed) en route to his third Super Bowl MVP. In winning the Super Bowl, the 49ers became the only team to win back-to-back Super Bowls under different head coaches. This 1989 championship team is often regarded as one of the most dominant teams in NFL history, winning three playoff games by a combined 100 points.

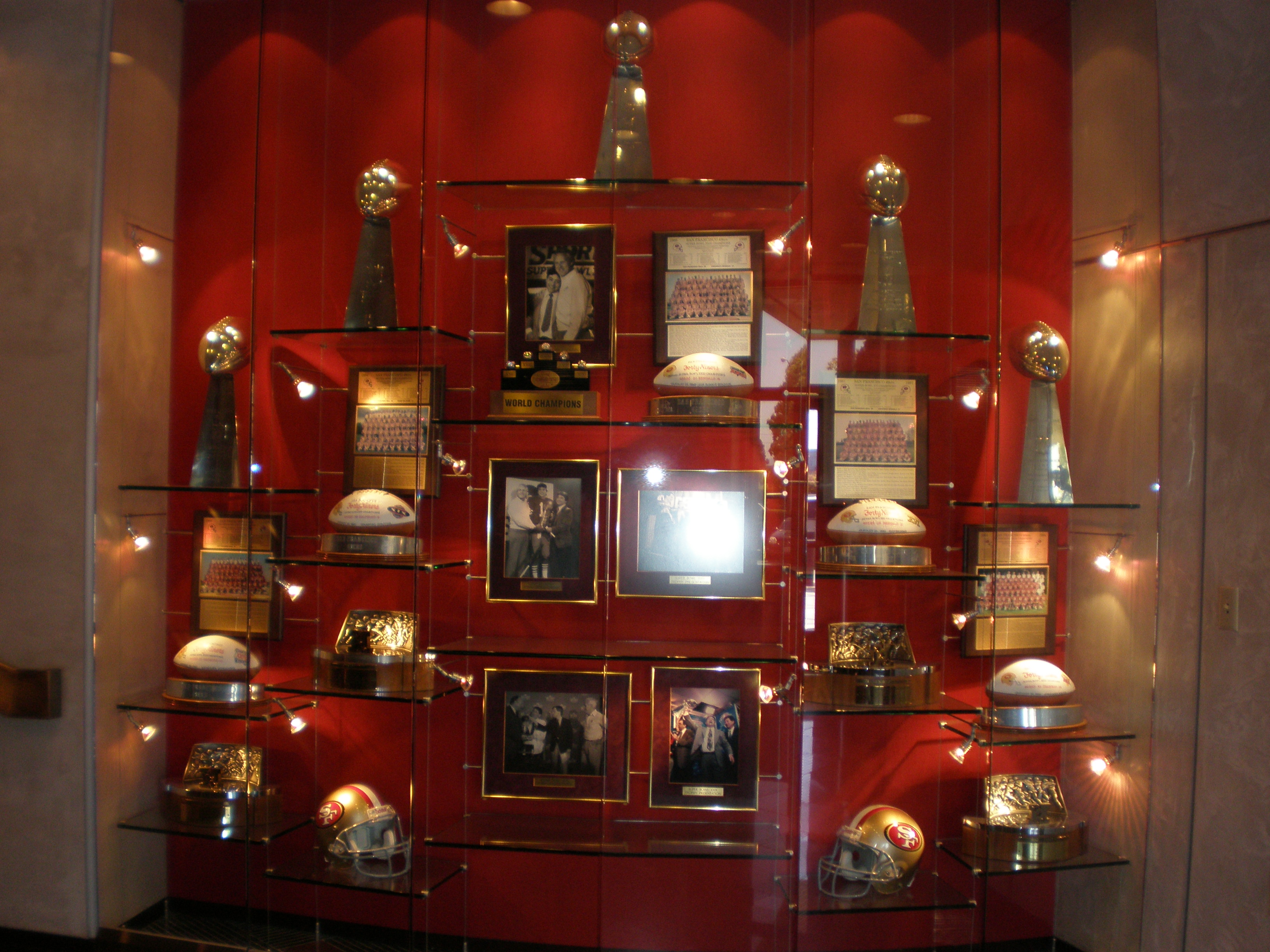
49ers wall of trophies at the Marie P. DeBartolo Sports Center

In 1990, the 49ers won their first 10 games, and they eventually finished 14–2. They ripped through the season, and the coveted third consecutive Super Bowl victory seemed within reach. In the playoffs, the 49ers dispatched the Washington Redskins 28–10, setting up a conference championship game with the New York Giants. Despite not scoring a touchdown in the game, the Giants took advantage of a fourth-quarter injury to Montana and converted a faked punt attempt to thwart the 49ers' attempt at a "three-peat". The Giants kicked a last-second field goal after recovering a Roger Craig fumble in the final minutes of the game, winning 15–13 and going on to win Super Bowl XXV.

During their quest for a "three-peat" between 1988 and 1990, the 49ers set a league record with 18 consecutive road victories. Joe Montana missed almost all of the following two seasons with a recurring elbow injury. Following the 1990 season, the 49ers left team stalwarts Roger Craig and Ronnie Lott unprotected and let them go to the Los Angeles Raiders via Plan B free agency.

In 1991, Steve Young injured the thumb on his throwing hand and later was sidelined with an injured knee. After 10 games, the 49ers had a record of 4–6. Backup quarterback Steve Bono helped the team win its next five games with Young sidelined. In the final game of the season, Monday night versus the NFC's number two seed, Young returned and the 49ers beat the Chicago Bears 52–14, finishing 10–6. However, the team missed qualifying for the playoffs by virtue of losing the head-to-head tiebreaker to the Atlanta Falcons, which had beaten the 49ers on a last-second Hail Mary pass earlier in the season.

In 1992, Joe Montana came back after missing almost two full seasons due to an elbow injury in his throwing arm and started the second half of a Monday night game versus Detroit on December 28, 1992. With the 49ers clinging to a 7–6 lead, Montana entered the game and looked as though he had not missed a single snap, completing 15–21 for 126 yards and 2 touchdowns, as the 49ers defeated the Lions 24–6. The 49ers finished the 1992 season with a 14–2 record and home-field advantage in the playoffs. San Francisco defeated the Washington Redskins 20–13 in the divisional playoff game but lost to the Dallas Cowboys 30–20 in the NFC Championship at Candlestick Park.

At the end of the 1992 season, partly fueled by media hype, the biggest quarterback controversy in football history was in full swing. After discussions with the owner and the coach, Montana asked for, and was granted, a trade to the Kansas City Chiefs prior to the 1993 season. Despite Eddie DeBartolo wanting Montana to stay and start, Montana realized that he and Young could not stay with the 49ers without a controversy. Montana was later quoted as saying, "If I had stayed and started, there would have been problems. If I had stayed and Steve Young had started, there would have been problems."

The 49ers finished the 1993 season, the team's first without Joe Montana on the roster, with a 10–6 record and no. 2 seed in the playoffs. San Francisco defeated the New York Giants 44–3 in the divisional playoff game but lost to the Dallas Cowboys 38–21 in the NFC Championship at Texas Stadium.

===== Super Bowl XXIX champions (1994) =====
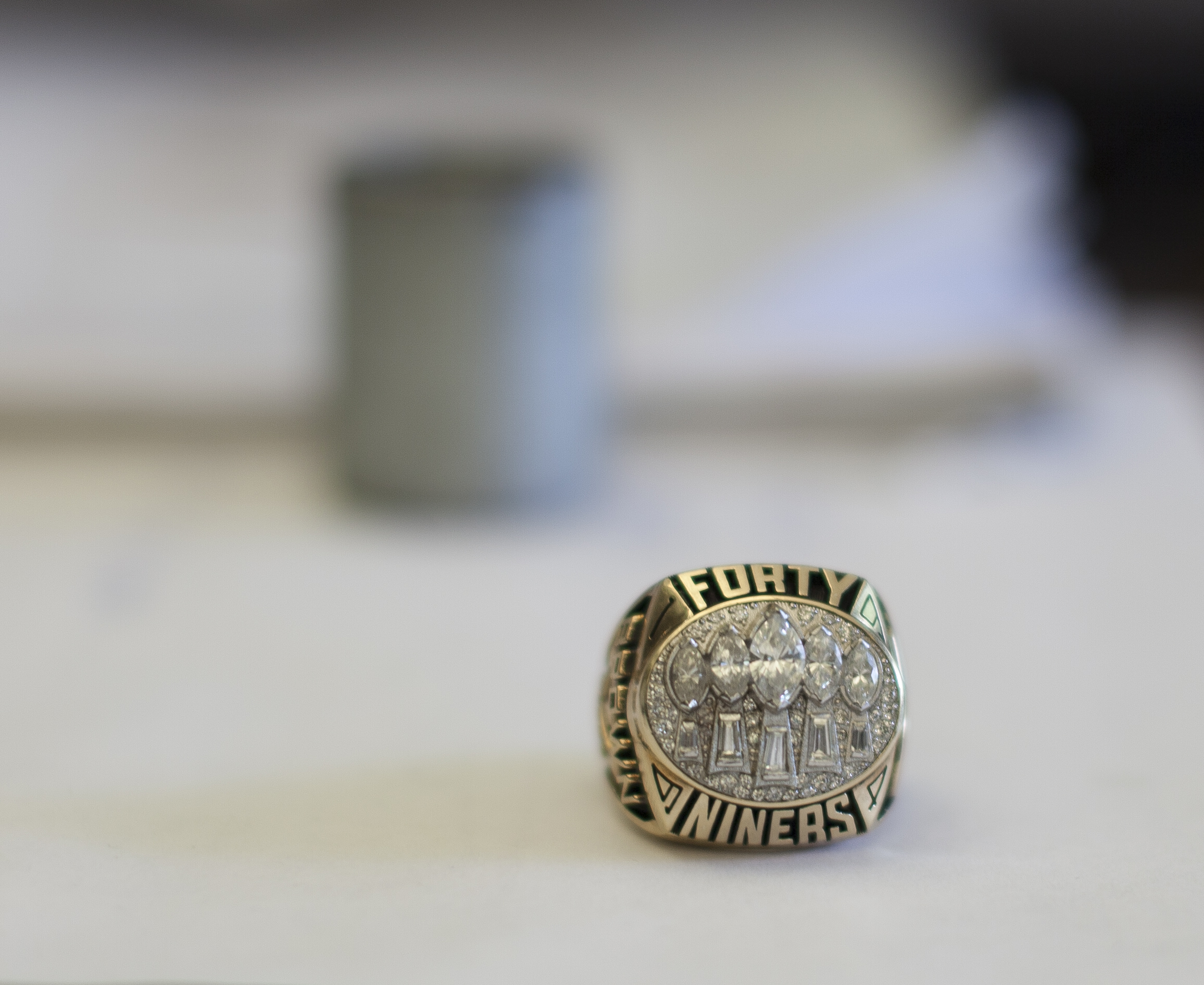
The 49ers ring for Super Bowl XXIX

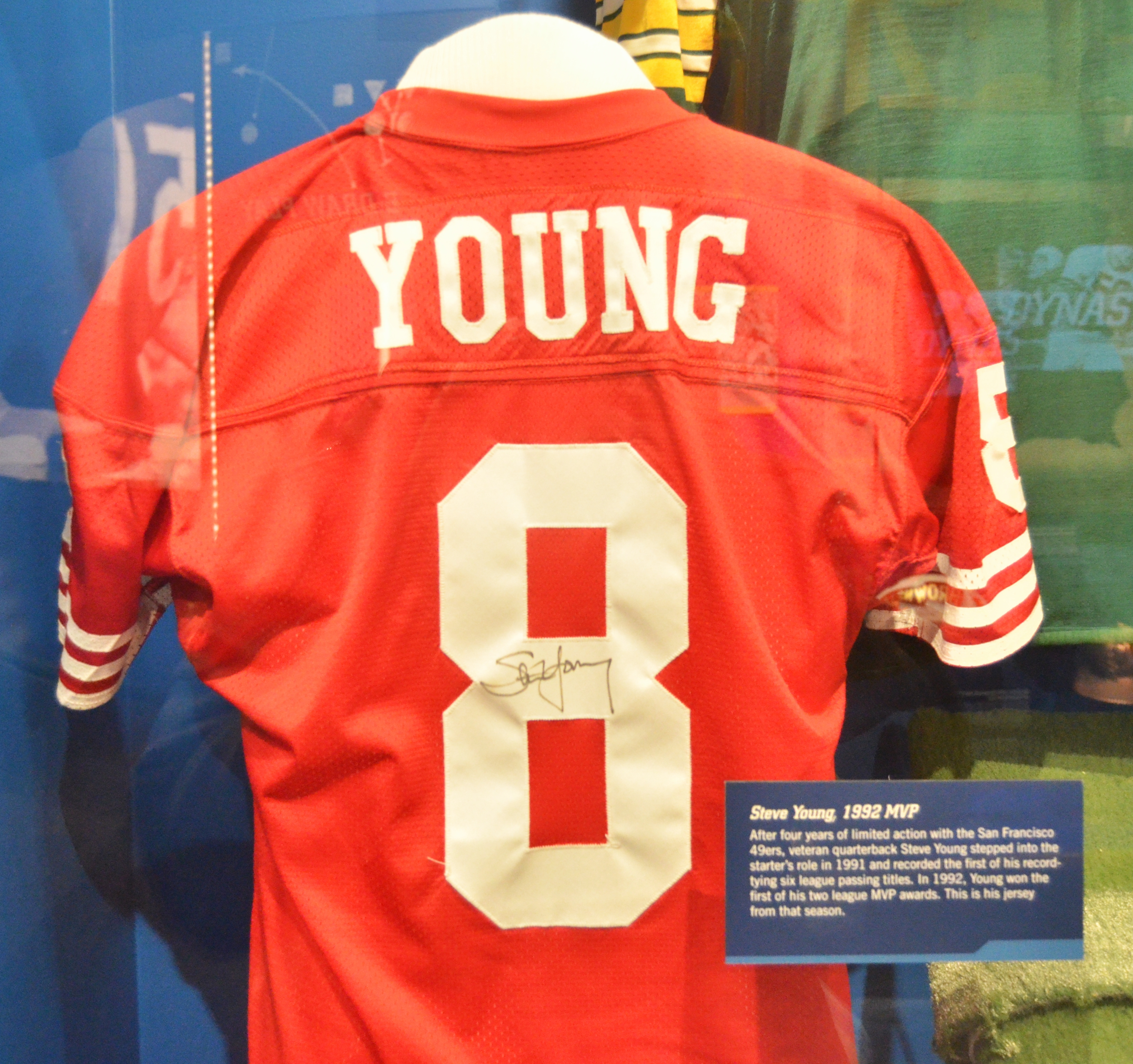
Quarterback Steve Young's jersey, displayed in the Pro Football Hall of Fame

In 1994, the team spent large amounts of money on the addition of several star free agents from other teams, including Ken Norton Jr., Gary Plummer, Rickey Jackson, Bart Oates, Richard Dent, Charles Mann and Deion Sanders. Additionally, several rookie players made key contributions to the team, some becoming season-long starters such as defensive tackle Bryant Young, fullback William Floyd, and linebacker Lee Woodall. Due to injuries to the offensive line, the 49ers had some tough times early in the season, including a 40–8 home loss to the Philadelphia Eagles, and a 24–17 loss to the Kansas City Chiefs, led by former 49ers quarterback Joe Montana. Following the Eagles game, a poll conducted on local sports radio station KNBR showed that an overwhelming majority of 49er fans wanted head coach George Seifert fired. The game against the Eagles was a turning point for the 49ers despite the lopsided score. Quarterback Steve Young was benched in the 3rd quarter and was later seen on the sidelines, shouting profanities at Seifert. The following week in Detroit, the 49ers trailed the Lions 7–0. After throwing a pass, Young was hit, picked up, and driven into the ground by three Lions defenders. He crawled most of the way off of the field before refusing help from the trainers as he limped the remaining way off the field. He returned to the field two plays later (NFL rules state that after trainers attend to an injured player, that player must leave the field for at least one play) to lead the 49ers to a 27–21 victory. The team rallied around Young to win 10 straight games, including a 21–14 victory over the two-time defending Super Bowl champion Dallas Cowboys. During that span the 49ers' average margin of victory was nearly 20 points per game, a sustained dominance not seen since the 1985 Chicago Bears. Despite scoring only 8 points in one game and 14 in another, the 49ers set a new record for total regular-season and post-season combined points scored. That record was later broken by the New England Patriots in 2007 (the 1998 Minnesota Vikings scored 556 regular-season points, but only 68 postseason points, for a total of 624 points, while the 1994 49ers scored 495 regular-season points and 131 postseason points for a total of 626, the second-highest mark in NFL history). Even after those initial rough spots early in the season, the 49ers finished the season 13–3 and with home-field advantage throughout the playoffs. In their first game, they easily defeated the Chicago Bears, 44–15, setting up the third straight 49ers–Cowboys NFC Championship Game. The 49ers took advantage of three early Cowboys turnovers, taking a 21–0 lead in the first quarter. Taking a 31–14 lead into halftime after a perfect 29-yard pass from Young to Rice in the closing seconds, the game appeared to be far out of reach for the Cowboys. But a 49er fumble on the opening kick of the 3rd quarter led to a Cowboy score, cutting the lead to 31–21. Later, the 49ers responded with a Young touchdown run, making it 38–21, before the Cowboys scored another touchdown in the final minutes for a final score of 38–28. The convincing win qualified the 49ers for their fifth Super Bowl appearance, and the first to be played by two teams from California. The 49ers steamrolled the San Diego Chargers 49–26 behind Young's record-setting 6 touchdown passes in Super Bowl XXIX, at the time becoming the first team to win a record five Super Bowls. Finally establishing himself as a worthy successor to Joe Montana, Young was named the game's MVP. The 49ers' run of five Super Bowl wins in 14 seasons (1981–1994) solidified them alongside the 1960s Vince Lombardi Green Bay Packers and 1970s Chuck Knoll Pittsburgh Steelers as one of the modern NFL's great dynasties.

The 49ers finished with a 11–5 record, won the division, and made the playoffs in 1995. The team finished with a 12–4 record and made the postseason in 1996. In both 1995 and 1996, they were eliminated by the Green Bay Packers both times in the Divisional Round. On January 17, 1997, George Seifert resigned as 49ers head coach. On the same day as Seifert's resignation, the 49ers hired Cal head coach Steve Mariucci as his replacement. At the time, Mariucci only had one year of head-coaching experience at any level. The first game of the 1997 season against the Tampa Bay Buccaneers was a disaster, as both quarterback Steve Young and receiver Jerry Rice went down with injuries. Rice appeared to be out for the season with a serious knee injury, while Young left the game with one of the many concussions he suffered throughout his career. However, the team overcame adversity: Young returned two weeks later, and with the league's number one defense, the 49ers finished the season with a 13–3 record which included an 11-game winning streak which was the longest by a rookie head coach at the time, and the 49ers became the quickest team in NFL history to clinch their division at the time. Rice returned for one and a half quarters in week 16 against the Denver Broncos, before getting another injury to his knee (unrelated to the first one). In the playoffs the 49ers defeated the Minnesota Vikings 38–22, advancing to the NFC Championship Game for the first time since 1994, where they again met the Green Bay Packers at Candlestick Park, but lost 23–10.

During that season Eddie DeBartolo Jr. was involved in a corruption investigation regarding Louisiana Governor Edwin Edwards and one of his Mississippi riverboat casinos. DeBartolo later pleaded guilty to a failure to report a felony charge in 1998. He was suspended from active control of the 49ers for one year. His sister, Denise, and her husband, Dr. John York, took over operations of the team.

In 1998, Jerry Rice finally returned from his knee injury week 1 against the New York Jets, a game best remembered for running back Garrison Hearst's 96-yard touchdown run in overtime to win the game. The 49ers had the 2nd most productive offense in league history. Young, who was questioned if his concussion history would put an end to his career, had his best season, throwing for 4,170 yards, 36 touchdowns and only 12 interceptions. A healthy Jerry Rice, 3rd-year player Terrell Owens, and 4th-year player J.J. Stokes became the first WR-trio in team history to catch at least 60 passes in the same season, Hearst ran for 1,570 yards and 7 touchdowns while averaging 5.1 yards per carry. The 49ers finished 12–4, their 16th straight winning season (all with 10 wins or more), earning a wildcard berth.

Once again, the 49ers faced the Green Bay Packers in the playoffs. Things looked bleak when the 49ers trailed 27–23 in the waning seconds. However, in the game's final moment, Young hit Terrell Owens (who was having a terrible game up to that point) on a dramatic, game-winning 25-yard touchdown pass, dubbed by many as "The Catch II". That put the 49ers ahead 30–27 with just three seconds left on the game clock, sealing the win. After finally beating the Packers, the 49ers went on to lose to the eventual NFC champion Atlanta Falcons in the Divisional round 20–18, in a game that was marked by Hearst suffering a gruesome broken ankle on the first play from scrimmage.

=== York family era (2000–present) ===
DeBartolo returned from his suspension in 1999, but a series of lawsuits over control of the family's vast holdings led him to surrender controlling interest to the Yorks as part of a 2000 settlement. Denise York became chair of the board, while John York became CEO. On the field, the 1999 49ers got off to a 3–1 start, then in a nationally televised Monday Night Football game against the Arizona Cardinals, Steve Young suffered a blindside hit from cornerback Aeneas Williams that knocked him out of the game and eventually convinced him to retire. At the time it was believed the severe hit ended his career but Young later said in interviews he could have come back to play another season or two. After meeting with then-general manager Bill Walsh and being told about how the salary cap troubles would make the team non-competitive, Young chose to retire rather than risk his long-term health further for a likely losing club. Without their future Hall of Famer, 29-year-old rookie Jeff Garcia took over as starting quarterback, but he would be benched for poor performances in favor of Steve Stenstrom. Garcia would be reinstated as the starting quarterback and in the final 5 games of the regular season. The 49ers lost 11 of their last 12 games and suffered their first losing season in a non-strike year since 1980, which was also the last time that the 49ers did not win at least ten or more games in a season. Bobb McKittrick, 49ers offensive line coach since 1979, also died of cancer following the 1999 season.

Before the 2000 season Jeff Garcia was named the starting quarterback despite the 49ers drafting two quarterbacks (Giovanni Carmazzi in the third round and Tim Rattay in the seventh). Garcia kept the starting job throughout the season and showed drastic improvement from the previous year. He broke a franchise record for most passing yards in one season, with 4,278 passing yards and 31 touchdowns and only 10 interceptions. Garcia and Terrell Owens, who established himself as the team's number-one receiver, both earned their first Pro Bowl selections. However, the 49ers finished 6–10, missing the playoffs for the second straight season for the first time since 1979 and 1980, due to a defense that gave up 26.4 points per game and a total of 422 points. The 2000 season was Jerry Rice's final year with the 49ers; he played 16 seasons with the team. In the 2001 season the 49ers established themselves as a playoff team once again after two down years. They finished with a 12–4 record and a wildcard berth. A quarter of their wins came in 4th-quarter comebacks. Their defense also had a bounce-back year, going from the 28th-ranked defense in 2000, to the 9th-ranked. Terrell Owens had become Jeff Garcia's favorite target. Garrison Hearst, who had been forced to retire from football after breaking his ankle in the 1998 divisional playoffs, finally returned to the line-up after over two years of rehabilitation. He became the first player in NFL history to come back to football after suffering avascular necrosis. He had an excellent season, rushing for 1,206 yards on a 4.8 average. His comeback earned him the NFL Comeback Player of the Year Award. In the final six weeks of the season the 49ers defense shut out three teams (the Buffalo Bills, Miami Dolphins, and New Orleans Saints), and had one of the most stupendous goal-line stands against the Philadelphia Eagles. In the team's first playoff game in 2 years, they played against the Green Bay Packers at Lambeau Field in the NFC Wild Card, but lost 25–15.

The 2002 NFL season began with the divisional realignment. The 49ers gained two new divisional rivals, the Seattle Seahawks and Arizona Cardinals, while former divisional foes Atlanta Falcons, New Orleans Saints, and Carolina Panthers moved to the newly formed NFC South. The team's production dropped from the previous year. Jeff Garcia went from having 31 and 32 touchdowns in the previous 2 seasons, to only 21 in 2002. The 49ers defense struggled at times, dropping from the 9th-ranked defense in the previous season to the 19th-ranked. Even though the team did not have the same success as they did in the 2001 regular season, the 49ers won the NFC West for the first time since 1997, with the division-clinching game coming on a last-second touchdown pass to Terrell Owens against the Dallas Cowboys. The 49ers finished 10–6. In the 2002–03 NFL playoffs they hosted the New York Giants in the 2002 NFC Wild Card. The Giants had a 38–14 lead late in the third quarter; however, the Giants defense, which had been highly ranked all year, began to collapse, and by the final minute in the 4th quarter Jeff Garcia had led the team back from the 24-point deficit to take a 1-point lead. Giants quarterback Kerry Collins then led a drive in the game's final minute to put the Giants at the 49ers' 23-yard line with six seconds left for a shot at a game-winning field goal. Long snapper Trey Junkin, who had been signed by the Giants that week, made a bad snap, so holder Matt Allen attempted a desperate pass down the field, which fell incomplete, but there was a flag on the play. The initial thought by spectators and the Giants was that pass interference had clearly been committed by the 49ers defense, but the flag was against the Giants for an ineligible receiver, so the game was over. The next day, the NFL admitted that the referee had blown the call, that the 49ers had indeed committed pass interference, and that the down should have been replayed. A press conference was held, and a reporter asked 49ers head coach Steve Mariucci about his thoughts on the NFL saying they blew the call, and he replied: "Bummer". It was the second-biggest comeback victory in NFL playoff history, with the 49ers winning 39–38. The 49ers lost the next week to the eventual Super Bowl champion Tampa Bay Buccaneers in the Divisional round, 31–6. This was the last postseason appearance for the 49ers until the 2011–12 playoffs. Steve Mariucci, whose published statements about his degree of power in the organization had frayed already-strained relations with management, was fired by John York, despite a winning record in a clash of egos.

Then-Oregon State head coach Dennis Erickson was signed to a five-year contract to replace Mariucci. The hiring of Erickson was highly criticized by the fans and the media, as Erickson's offensive philosophy was very different from the West Coast offense. The 2003 season was one of turmoil for the 49ers. While the Niners started the season with a 49–7 demolishing of Chicago, the team quickly began to unravel afterwards, as the relationship between Garcia and Owens turned sour upon Garcia taking issue with Owens's public praise for the play of backup quarterback Tim Rattay. Garcia responded with a cryptic remark of "we cannot let the sickness spread"; in response, Owens wore a surgeon's mask at the following practice. The team was also ravaged by injuries to key players on both sides of the ball; the often reckless play of Jeff Garcia started to take a toll on him, as he was forced to miss 3 games during the season. The 49ers finished 7–9 and missed the playoffs. Despite this disappointing result, Erickson was retained as coach for the 2004 season. Owens' on- and off-field antics led to the 49ers trading him to the Philadelphia Eagles during the offseason. Several other key 49er players were released due to salary cap concerns, including Garcia and Hearst. The team finished the 2004 season with a 2–14 record, tying a franchise-worst and finishing last in the NFC West for the first time since 1979, ending what had been the NFL's longest active streak for not finishing last in a division. With the worst record in the NFL the team secured the rights to the first pick in the NFL Draft. Dennis Erickson and general manager Terry Donahue were fired.

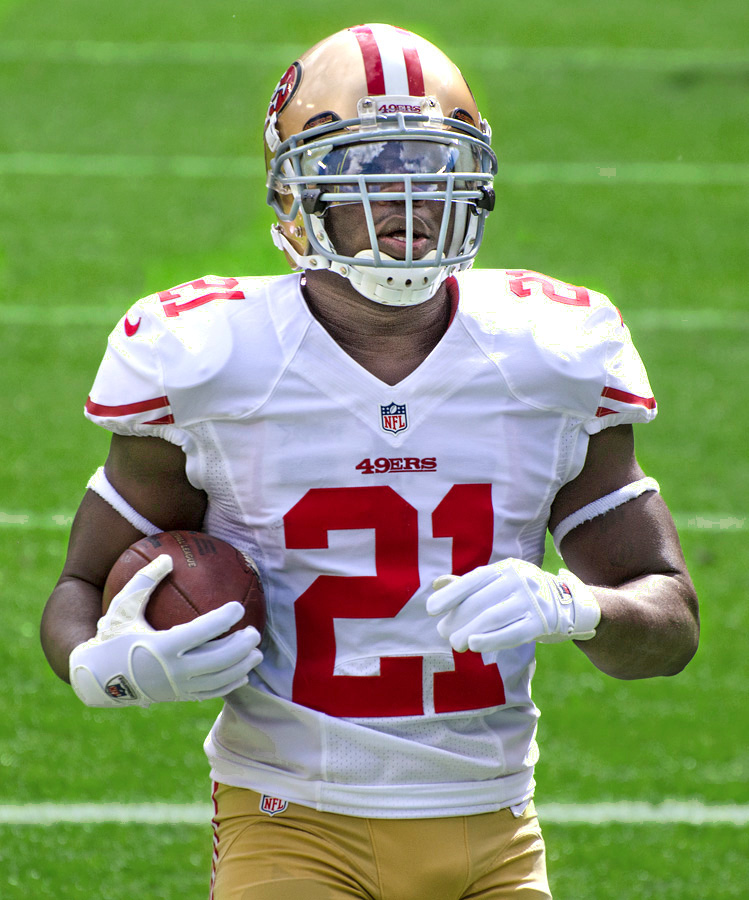
49ers' former running back Frank Gore

After an extensive coaching search, the 49ers hired the defensive coordinator of the Baltimore Ravens Mike Nolan as their head coach. Nolan was the son of Dick Nolan, who had led the team to three consecutive playoff appearances from 1970 to 1972. The 49ers did not hire a general manager. In Mike Nolan's first draft as head coach, he selected quarterback Alex Smith from the University of Utah with the first overall pick of the 2005 NFL draft. It was a pick predicted by most, though many thought the 49ers might select local product Aaron Rodgers of the University of California. Alex Smith's rookie season was a disaster, producing only one touchdown against eleven interceptions. The team finished 4th in the NFC West for the second consecutive year, with a 4–12 record. This earned the 49ers the 6th pick in the 2006 NFL draft which they used to draft tight end Vernon Davis. Alex Smith and the team improved greatly in 2006, led by second-year player Frank Gore from the University of Miami. Gore ran for a franchise record of 1,695 rushing yards, which led the NFC, along with 8 touchdowns. He was awarded his first Pro Bowl appearance. They also swept their division rival and defending NFC champion Seattle Seahawks, and kept the Denver Broncos from a playoff berth in the last game of the season. However, the team finished 7–9, their fourth consecutive losing season.

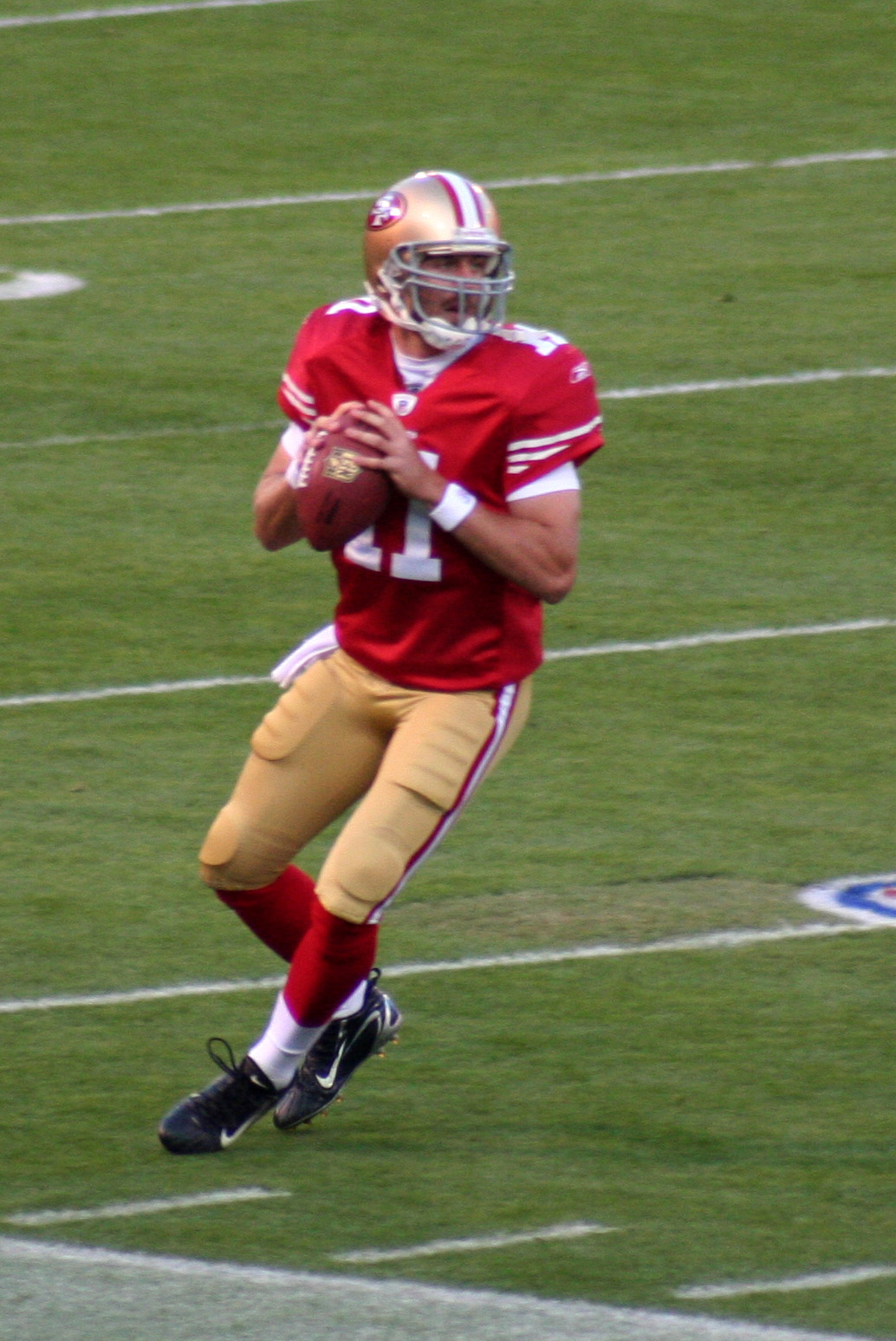
49ers' former quarterback Alex Smith

In the off-season, the 49ers signed cornerback Nate Clements and safety Michael Lewis to improve their secondary. Clement's contract was worth $80 million for eight years, the largest contract given to a defensive player in NFL history at the time. In the NFL draft, the 49ers made another key addition to their defense, selecting middle linebacker Patrick Willis with the 11th overall pick. Willis would eventually be named the 2007 AP NFL Defensive Rookie of the Year. Before the beginning of the 2007 season, Hall of Fame coach Bill Walsh died of complications from leukemia. The 49ers started the season 2–0, for the first time since 1998. In the fourth game of the season, against the Seattle Seahawks, Alex Smith suffered a separated shoulder on the third play of the game, an injury that severely hampered his play and ultimately led to an early end to his 2008 campaign after having shoulder surgery. Chiefly due to back-up quarterback Trent Dilfer's struggles and Alex Smith's injury, the 49ers lost eight straight consecutive games from week three through week twelve, ending the year with a disappointing 5–11 record. Questions were raised about the future of Alex Smith, whose first three seasons had been plagued by inconsistent play, injuries, and never having had the same offensive coordinator from one year to the next. Head coach Mike Nolan and new offensive coordinator Mike Martz stated that a competition between Smith, Shaun Hill, and NFL journeyman J. T. O'Sullivan would run through the first two preseason games of 2008. O'Sullivan was named the 49ers starter because of his familiarity with the Martz offense and after performing better than Smith or Hill in the first three preseason games. On October 20, 2008, after a 2–5 start, Mike Nolan was fired. Assistant head coach Mike Singletary, a Hall of Fame linebacker with the Chicago Bears, was named as the interim head coach. Singletary proved to be a fan favorite when after his first game as head coach he delivered a memorable post-game interview. Singletary said of their loss: "... right now, we've got to figure out the formula. Our formula. Our formula is this: We go out, we hit people in the mouth." The team went 5–4 overall under Singletary, winning five of its final seven games and ending the season with a 7–9 record. After the last game of the season, Singletary was named permanent head coach by Jed York, who had been appointed as team president just days before. Jed York is the son of John York and Denise DeBartolo York.

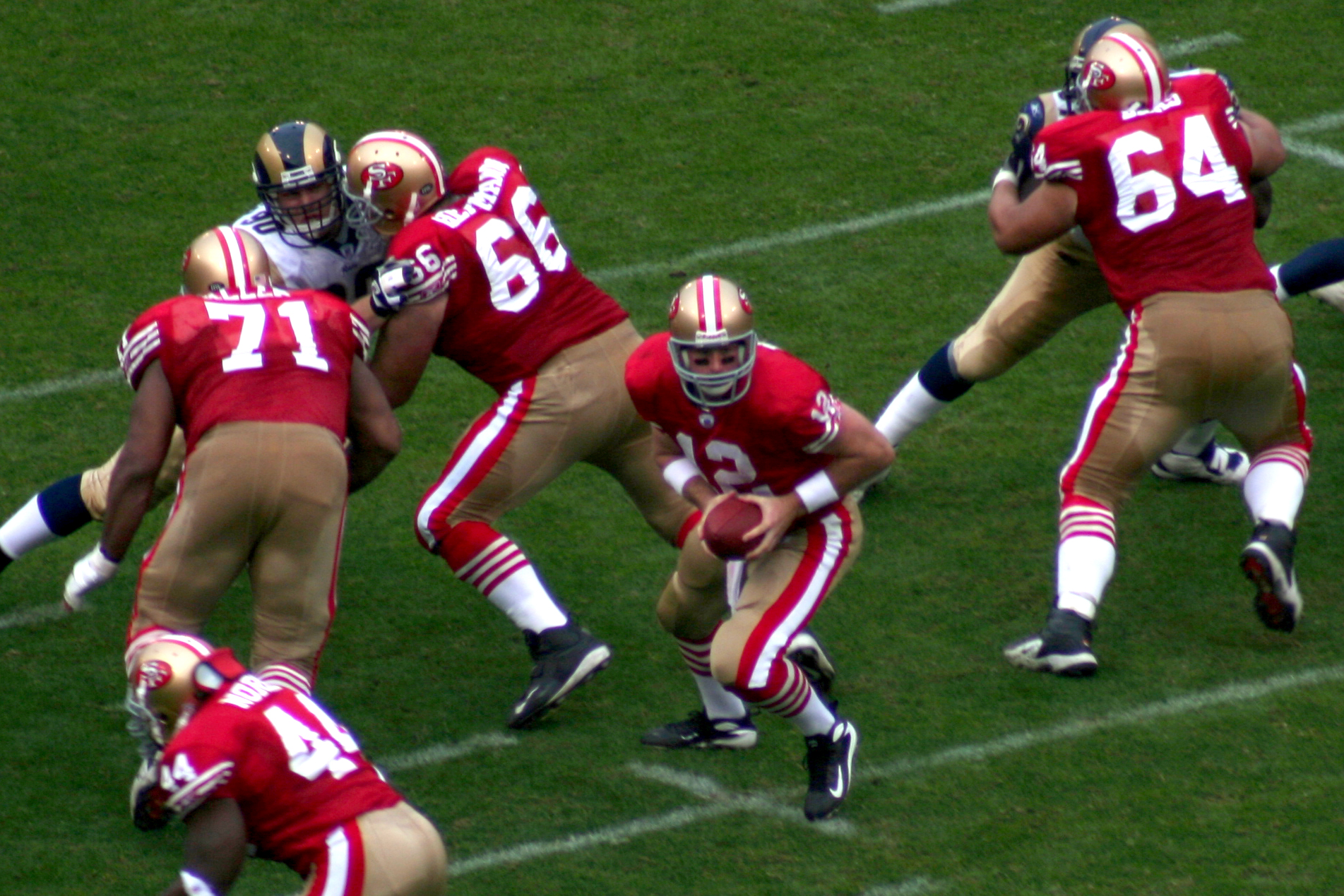
Trent Dilfer (#12) quarterbacks the 2007 49ers.

On April 25, 2009, the 49ers selected Texas Tech wide receiver Michael Crabtree, a player many people thought would go in the top five, with the 10th pick in the first round of the 2009 NFL draft. The 2009 training camp became the first since 2005 that the 49ers failed to have all drafted rookies signed and in training camp on time, as Crabtree held out trying to reach a contract. He finally reached a contract agreement on October 7, 2009, having missed the first four games of the regular season. The 49ers posted an 8–8 record after a frustrating season, losing only 2 games by more than a touchdown. Nevertheless, it was the team's first non-losing season since 2002. Despite missing the playoffs for the seventh straight season, several key players showed signs of improvement. Alex Smith regained his role as the 49ers' starting quarterback (after Shaun Hill had won the starting job in training camp), passing for more than 2,000 yards with 19 touchdowns, while Frank Gore collected his fourth consecutive 1,000-yard season, a 49ers record. Safety Dashon Goldson showed signs of potential in his first year as full-time starter, as he tallied 94 tackles, four interceptions, three forced fumbles, and two sacks. Vernon Davis in particular had a breakthrough year at tight end, earning Pro Bowl honors with 965 yards and 13 touchdowns (tying the NFL record for his position). 2010 saw five 49ers go to the Pro Bowl: Patrick Willis, Vernon Davis, Frank Gore, Justin Smith, and punter Andy Lee.

The 2010 season started with the 49ers heavy favorites to win the NFC West after Cardinals quarterback Kurt Warner retired early in the offseason, but the season was a disaster. They started 0–5, their worst start since the dark days of 1979. In week 3, the 49ers fired offensive coordinator Jimmy Raye, who had been hand-picked by Singletary in the 2009 offseason. Starting safety Michael Lewis demanded to be released after he was demoted in favor of rookie safety Taylor Mays. By mid-season, Singletary was switching quarterbacks between Alex Smith and Troy Smith, who had been picked up in free agency after the preseason, but with little effect. On December 27, 2010, the 49ers fired Mike Singletary as head coach, naming defensive line coach Jim Tomsula as interim head coach for the last game of the season. The 49ers finished 6–10 that season.

==== Jim Harbaugh years (2011–2014) ====
On January 4, 2011, Jed York promoted interim General Manager Trent Baalke to be the permanent general manager. Baalke had taken over the role after former general manager Scot McCloughan was relieved of his duties the year before. Two days later, on January 7, 2011, former head coach of Stanford University Jim Harbaugh was named the 49ers new head coach. In the 2011 NFL draft, the 49ers selected defensive end/linebacker Aldon Smith from the University of Missouri with the seventh pick of the first round. The 49ers also selected quarterback Colin Kaepernick from the University of Nevada, Reno with the 36th overall pick in the second round.

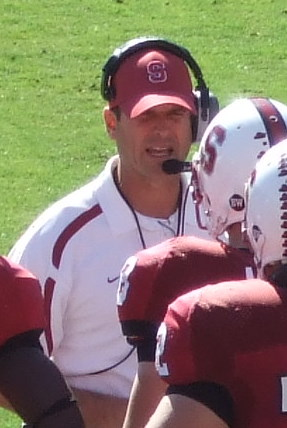
Jim Harbaugh took over as head coach in 2011.

After the end of a labor dispute that nearly threatened to postpone or cancel the 2011 season the 49ers made a controversial decision to re-sign Alex Smith to a one-year $4.8 million contract. Because of the decision to retain Smith, and a shortened offseason with an entirely new coaching staff being hired, the team was expected to be among the league's worst by NFL prognosticators. Despite this, Harbaugh's first season was a huge success. After 10 weeks the 49ers were 9–1, highlighted by road wins against the Philadelphia Eagles, where the team came back from a 20-point deficit in the second half, and the previously unbeaten Detroit Lions. The 49ers' defense became one of the most intimidating in the league, particularly against the run – not allowing a 100-yard rusher or a single rushing touchdown until week 16 of the regular season. Alex Smith blossomed in the new system, reviving his career while playing for yet another new offensive coordinator – his sixth in six years. In week 13 the 49ers won the NFC West with a victory against the St. Louis Rams, finally ending their nine-year playoff drought. The 49ers finished the season with a 13–3 record, earning the second overall seed in the NFC Playoffs. In the Divisional Playoffs they defeated the New Orleans Saints 36–32 after a touchdown pass from Alex Smith to Vernon Davis in the closing seconds of the game. The team reached the NFC Championship for the first time since 1997 and faced the New York Giants. They lost to the Giants with a 20–17 score in overtime after two critical fumbles by backup return man Kyle Williams.

In 2012, the 49ers were predicted to be the NFC West champions and possibly make a run for the Super Bowl. Starting the season 6–2, the 49ers went on to face the rival St. Louis Rams in Week 10. Alex Smith suffered a concussion in the second quarter and exited the game. He was replaced by 2011 second-round pick Colin Kaepernick, who led the 49ers back to tie the game. The next week, Kaepernick and the 49ers blew out the Chicago Bears 32–7, and Harbaugh chose Kaepernick as the starter next week against the New Orleans Saints, despite Smith being cleared to play. A quarterback controversy began. Despite Smith leading the NFL in completion percentage (70%) and passer rating (104.1), Kaepernick was considered more dynamic with his scrambling ability and arm strength. Kaepernick eventually started the rest of the season, going 5–2. Kaepernick set the record for rushing yards for a quarterback in the playoffs with 181 rushing yds against the Green Bay Packers. The 49ers defeated the Packers and Atlanta Falcons in the playoffs and advanced to Super Bowl XLVII, but were denied their sixth Super Bowl win against the Baltimore Ravens, who were coached by John Harbaugh, 34–31.

Another storyline towards the end of the 2012 season was the reliability of kicker David Akers. Towards the end of the season, he began to show signs of decline, missing one field goal of 20–30 yards, two field goals of 30–40 yards, and six field goals of 40–50 yards for a below-average conversion percentage of 69%. Akers was released on March 6, 2013. Shortly afterwards, the 49ers signed veteran kicker Phil Dawson. The 49ers would also trade a sixth round draft pick for wide receiver Anquan Boldin from the Baltimore Ravens, the team that had beaten them in the Super Bowl.

The 49ers finished 12–4 in the 2013 regular season and enter the playoffs as a wildcard, with their first game at Lambeau Field against the Green Bay Packers. On January 5, 2014, San Francisco 49ers defeated Green Bay Packers 23–20. On January 12, 2014, the 49ers defeated the Carolina Panthers 23–10, thus advancing to their third straight NFC Championship Game. However, the 49ers' season ended at CenturyLink Field in Seattle, when a pass intended for Michael Crabtree was tipped by cornerback Richard Sherman and intercepted by linebacker Malcolm Smith, losing to the Seattle Seahawks, 23–17. After the Niners had their first 8–8 season in 4 years, which included losses to the Bay Area rival Oakland Raiders, Chicago Bears, and St. Louis Rams, the collapse of a once-dominant offensive line, failing to reach the playoffs, Harbaugh and the 49ers decided to part ways on December 28, 2014, after the season's final game, against the Arizona Cardinals, which the 49ers won 20–17.

On November 8, 2006, reports surfaced that the 49ers ended negotiations with the city of San Francisco about building a new stadium and plan to do so in Santa Clara, a suburb of San Jose; Santa Clara already hosts the team's administrative headquarters and training facility. The Yorks and then-San Francisco mayor Gavin Newsom had been talking over the last few months about building a privately financed stadium at Candlestick Point that was intended to be part of the city's bid for the 2016 Summer Olympics. The 49ers' final decision to move the stadium ended the San Francisco bid for the 2016 Summer Olympics. San Francisco, Los Angeles, and Chicago were the three cities competing to be the U.S. Olympic Committee's choice to bid on the 2016 games, with Chicago emerging as the eventual victor.

The 49ers sponsored Measure J, which appeared on the June 8, 2010, Santa Clara ballot, to build a new stadium as the future home of the San Francisco 49ers in that city. The measure passed with 58.2% of the total vote. This was seen as the first step for the 49ers' move to a venue to be built in Santa Clara.

The 68,490-seat venue, Levi's Stadium, landed rights for its first event. The stadium was home to the Fight Hunger Bowl. On the 49ers website, the team's owner, businessman John York had a letter stating that after a stadium is constructed in Santa Clara, the team would retain its name "San Francisco" even though the team would no longer be located within Metro San Francisco.

United States Senator Dianne Feinstein and other leaders threatened an attempt to prevent the team from using "San Francisco" or the "49ers" in the team name, but probably would not have succeeded without changes to state or federal law.

York confirmed in a press conference on November 9, 2011, that the team would build a state-of-the-art stadium in Santa Clara in time for the 2014 season. Ground was broken for the new stadium on April 19, 2012.

On May 8, 2013, the 49ers announced that San Francisco-based Levi Strauss & Co. had purchased the naming rights to the new stadium. The deal calls for Levi's to pay $220.3 million to the city of Santa Clara and the 49ers over 20 years, with an option to extend the deal for another five years for around $75 million.

Jim Tomsula was hired on January 14, 2015, to replace Jim Harbaugh. Subsequently, Geep Chryst was promoted to offensive coordinator and Eric Mangini was hired as defensive coordinator. On March 10, 2015, All-Pro linebacker Patrick Willis announced his retirement from the NFL due to repeated injuries to both feet. A week later on March 17, linebacker Chris Borland, Patrick Willis' presumed replacement, announced his retirement from the NFL due to fears of the effects of head trauma. These two retirements left the 49ers linebackers position group weakened as they headed into an offseason under first year head coach Jim Tomsula. Two other developments during the 49ers off season, the retirements of starters defensive end Justin Smith, and right tackle Anthony Davis, and the uncertainty of linebacker Aldon Smith's availability due to his legal issues.

The 49ers signed running back Reggie Bush, wide receiver Torrey Smith, and defensive tackle Darnell Dockett.

Tomsula employed new coaching practices, which included giving his players breaks to check social media during meetings, shorter, easier practices, and more days off. The result was one of the worst offenses in team history. Scoring only 238 points, the 49ers struggled to a 5–11 season, with Colin Kaepernick ending the season on injured reserve after being benched. The 49ers would ultimately be eliminated from postseason contention in Week 14 of the 2015 regular season. On January 4, 2016, the 49ers fired Tomsula after he led them to a 5–11 record.

On January 14, 2016, Chip Kelly was hired as head coach. Kelly's tenure began with an emphatic 28–0 victory over the Los Angeles Rams on Monday Night Football. However, the team went on to lose a franchise-record 13 straight games until they narrowly defeated the Rams 22–21 on December 24, 2016. On October 21, 2016, in an ESPN ranking of professional sports franchises, the 49ers were ranked the worst franchise in North America. The 49ers ended up firing Kelly and Baalke following the conclusion of the regular season, finishing with a 2–14 record.

In 2016, Kaepernick knelt during the playing of the national anthem as a protest the treatment of minorities in the United States. Others followed suit throughout the NFL, drawing controversy. President Donald Trump spoke out against the protests a number of times, and Vice President Mike Pence walked out of a 49ers game in October 2017 upon seeing players kneel.

==== Kyle Shanahan years (2017–present) ====
After hiring John Lynch as general manager and Kyle Shanahan as head coach, the 49ers started the 2017 season with nine consecutive losses. During this time, they traded for New England Patriots backup quarterback Jimmy Garoppolo. After a win over the New York Giants and a loss to the Seattle Seahawks, Garoppolo was named the starter after rookie C. J. Beathard suffered an injury. The 49ers won their last five games with Garoppolo at the helm and finished the season 6–10. After the season, the 49ers signed Garoppolo to a five-year, $137.5 million contract extension. This made him the highest-paid player in NFL history on a per-year basis at the time. During the third-week matchup between the 49ers and Kansas City Chiefs, Garoppolo tore his ACL, and was ruled out for the rest of the 2018 season. The 49ers struggled to a 4–12 record in the 2018 season.

The 49ers started the 2019 season with an 8–0 record. This was the first time they had gone 8–0 since 1990, where they started the season 10–0 and eventually lost in the NFC Championship Game. In Week 7, the 49ers defeated the Washington Redskins at FedExField in a game referred to as a Mud Bowl with a final score of 9–0. This was the first time the 49ers shut out an opponent since Week 1 of the 2016 season, versus the Los Angeles Rams. In Week 8, the 49ers defeated the Carolina Panthers, 51–13, making it the 12th time the team has scored 50 points or more against opponents in the regular season. The 49ers' undefeated record was broken in Week 10 with an overtime loss against the Seattle Seahawks, giving them an 8–1 record. They went on to beat the Arizona Cardinals, the Green Bay Packers, and the New Orleans Saints, while losing to the Baltimore Ravens by a last-second field goal, dropping them to 11–2. The 49ers then lost their next game in the final seconds to the Atlanta Falcons. The 49ers defeated the Los Angeles Rams 34–31 and advanced to 12–3, eliminating the Rams from playoff contention in the process.

On December 29, 2019, the 49ers defeated the Seahawks 26–21 in the Week 17 regular-season finale thereby clinching the NFC West in addition to the number one seed for the first time since 1997. In their first playoff game since 2013, against the Minnesota Vikings, they dominated the Vikings, defeating them 27–10. This victory ensured them a spot in the NFC Championship Game, in Levi's Stadium, where they played the Green Bay Packers. On January 19, 2020, they beat the Packers 37–20, advancing to their first Super Bowl since 2012. The 49ers also became the first team to reach the Super Bowl following four straight seasons with 10+ losses. In Super Bowl LIV, the 49ers led the Kansas City Chiefs 20–10 with seven minutes remaining in the fourth quarter but lost the game by the final score of 31–20, resulting in the Chiefs' first championship victory since 1969.

The 49ers had a 6–10 record in 2020, usually attributed to the number of injuries on the team.

In 2021, they had a 10–7 record and advanced to the playoffs as the #6-seed. On January 16, 2022, they defeated the Dallas Cowboys 23–17 in the Wild Card Round. The next week, in the Divisional Round, they defeated the Green Bay Packers 13–10, the winning margin from a field goal on the game's last play. On January 30, they faced the Los Angeles Rams for the NFC Championship, where the Rams overcame a ten-point deficit in the fourth quarter to win 20–17, assisted in part by a costly Jimmy Garoppolo interception and a critical interception dropped by Jaquiski Tartt.

In 2022, they overcame their 3–4 status at the beginning of the season and vaulted into 13–4, giving them the division title. Trey Lance, who was the original starter for the Niners, was injured within the first three games and replaced by Garoppolo. However, after an injury during a game against the Miami Dolphins, Garoppolo was replaced by third-string quarterback Brock Purdy, who became a star within the team, winning all of his starts with 13 touchdowns and 4 interceptions in the final 5 games to clinch the NFC 2nd seed and a spot in the playoffs. In the Wild Card Round, the 49ers defeated the Seahawks 41–23. In the Divisional Round, they defeated the Dallas Cowboys 19–12. However, in the NFC Conference Championship Round, both Purdy and fourth-string quarterback Josh Johnson suffered injuries. The 49ers were mostly unable to acquire offensive points as they lost 31–7 to the Philadelphia Eagles, who would move on to lose to the Kansas City Chiefs in Super Bowl LVII.

This was the last season for both Trey Lance and Jimmy Garoppolo, who were traded to the Dallas Cowboys and signed by the Las Vegas Raiders, respectively, making Brock Purdy the titular quarterback for the 2023 season. They opened the season with a five-game winning streak, but then lost to the Cleveland Browns off a last-minute missed field goal, setting up a 3-game losing streak heading into the bye week. After the bye week, the team went on a 6-win streak and clinched the NFC West after beating the Arizona Cardinals 45–29. Two weeks later, the 49ers clinched the 1st seed in the NFC by beating the Washington Commanders, combined with losses from the Detroit Lions and the Philadelphia Eagles, ending the regular season with a record of 12–5.

In the postseason, they defeated the Green Bay Packers in a close game 24–21 to reach the NFC Championship Game for the third consecutive season, and their fourth in five seasons. In the NFC Championship Game, after being down 24–7 at halftime against the Detroit Lions, the 49ers rallied off a 27–7 run to win 34–31, allowing them to reach Super Bowl LVIII, which was a rematch of Super Bowl LIV with the Chiefs. The 49ers would lose the game 25–22 in the second-ever Super Bowl to go into overtime.

In March 2024, Jed York acquired enough of his mother's equity in the 49ers to become principal owner, though his parents stayed on as co-chairs. In a 2024 season marred by injuries, the 49ers finished with a 6–11 record.

== Championships ==
=== Super Bowls ===
The 49ers have won five Super Bowls, tied for the most of any NFC team. Their first three came under head coach Bill Walsh. Walsh retired after winning his third in 1988, but first-year head coach George Seifert did not miss a beat, winning the Super Bowl in his first year in 1989. He would also win one more in 1994.

Year	Head coach	Super Bowl	Location	Opponent	Score	Record	Ref
1981	Bill Walsh	XVI	Pontiac Silverdome (Pontiac, MI)	Cincinnati Bengals	26–21	16–3	
1984	Bill Walsh	XIX	Stanford Stadium (Stanford, CA)	Miami Dolphins	38–16	18–1	
1988	Bill Walsh	XXIII	Joe Robbie Stadium (Miami)	Cincinnati Bengals	20–16	13–6	
1989	George Seifert	XXIV	Louisiana Superdome (New Orleans)	Denver Broncos	55–10	17–2	
1994	George Seifert	XXIX	Joe Robbie Stadium (Miami)	San Diego Chargers	49–26	16–3	
Total Super Bowls won: 5

=== NFC championships ===
Year	Head coach	Location	Opponent	Score	Record	Ref.
1981	Bill Walsh	Candlestick Park (San Francisco)	Dallas Cowboys	28–27	16–3	
1984	Bill Walsh	Candlestick Park (San Francisco)	Chicago Bears	23–0	18–1	
1988	Bill Walsh	Soldier Field (Chicago)	Chicago Bears	28–3	13–6	
1989	George Seifert	Candlestick Park (San Francisco)	Los Angeles Rams	30–3	17–2	
1994	George Seifert	Candlestick Park (San Francisco)	Dallas Cowboys	38–28	16–3	
2012	Jim Harbaugh	Georgia Dome (Atlanta)	Atlanta Falcons	28–24	13–5–1	
2019	Kyle Shanahan	Levi's Stadium (Santa Clara)	Green Bay Packers	37–20	15–4	
2023	Kyle Shanahan	Levi's Stadium (Santa Clara)	Detroit Lions	34–31	14–5	
Total NFC championships won: 8

== Logos and uniforms ==
=== Logo ===
The original 49ers logo was an illustration of a mustached gold miner from the 1849 California Gold Rush, dressed in plaid pants and a red shirt, jumping in midair with his hat falling off, and firing pistols in each hand: one nearly shooting his foot, and the other pistol forming the word "Forty-Niners" from its smoke. An alternate logo with a shield-shaped crest formed from the number "49", with a football in the upper right quadrant and "SF" in the lower-left quadrant was created in 1965 and used for marketing purposes until 1972. From 1962, the 49ers' logo has been the iconic "SF" within the center of a red oval; throughout the years the logo has had minor modifications, such as a black outlining on the intertwined "SF" that was added in 1989 and a gold trimming inside the oval that was added in 1996.

=== Uniforms ===
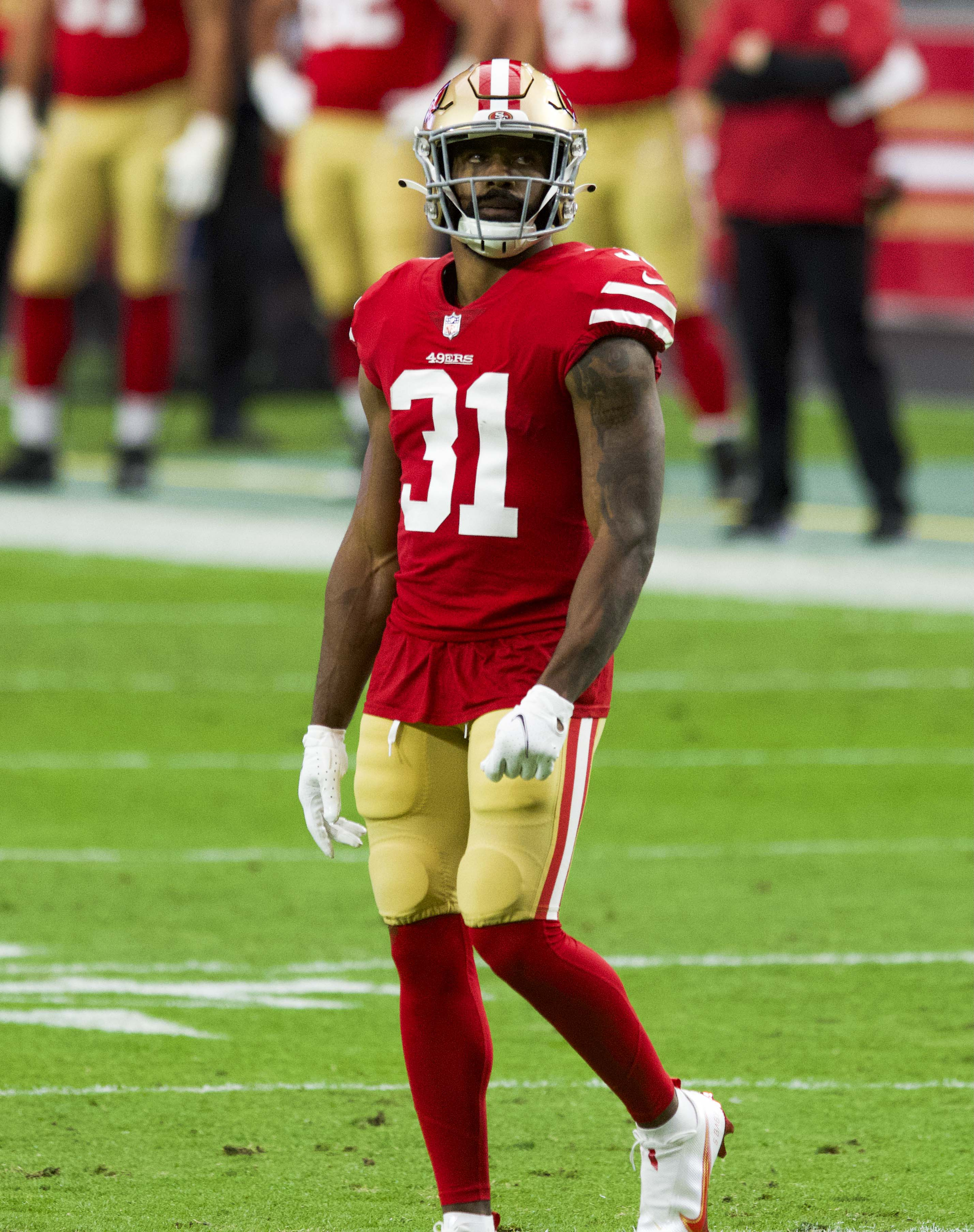
2021 home uniform, worn by former 49ers running back Raheem Mostert

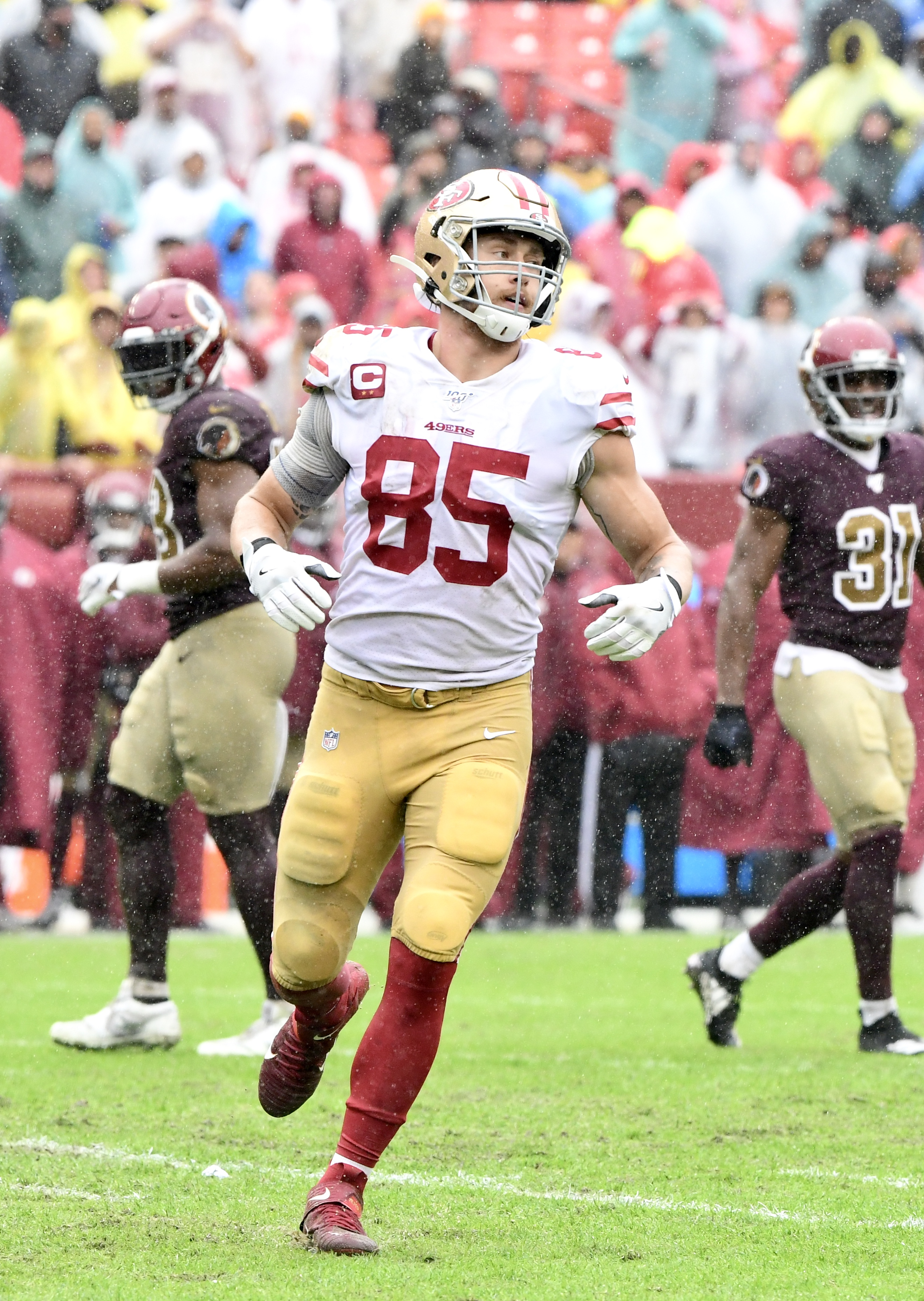
2021 road uniform, worn by George Kittle

The San Francisco 49ers have two different uniforms: red and gold home uniforms and white, red, and gold road uniforms. However, the 49ers have changed uniform designs and color combinations quite often throughout their history. From the team's inception in 1946, they wore dark or cardinal red, switching to scarlet red jerseys and gold pants for the 1948 season, with a gold helmet with one red stripe, with solid red socks and pants with no stripes.

Entering the 1949 season, the first in the NFL, the 49ers adopted three stripes to their red jerseys, wearing gold helmets and pants, with no stripes and red socks with three white stripes. In the 1953, '54, and '55 seasons, the 49ers wore red helmets with a gold stripe in the middle, with silver pants with one single stripe of red. The socks also added the three stripes similar to the jersey's.

1955 was also unique in that the 49ers wore white pants with a black stripe bounded by two red stripes, and shadow drop numbers on their red jerseys, with black shadow drop borders on the white numerals. The following season, 1956, the team wore white helmets with no stripes, and white pants with a red stripe.

In 1957 the 49ers wore red jerseys, a gold helmet with no stripes, and gold pants with no stripes; for the first time the 49ers wore white on the road, as dictated by the NFL for all teams, to have at least one team wearing a light-colored jersey during games. The first white jersey had two red stripes with a gold in the middle, as was their road socks: white, with two red stripes and gold in the middle. San Francisco wore red and gold in 1958 as well, with their white jersey having a single shoulder loop stripe, as well as adding TV numbers to the sleeves of their home and away jerseys. And in contrast to the socks at home, red with three red stripes, the away socks were solid red.

In 1959 the team switched to red and platinum gold (looking more like silver), and for the next several years afterwards, with their white jerseys having double shoulder loop stripes (mimicking UCLA's), but continuing with the three white stripes on the sleeves above the elbow and below the TV numbers, with the red home jerseys.

In 1960, the team added "Northwestern" red stripes to their helmets (a thicker middle stripe bordered by two thinner stripes), and that changed in 1962, with the addition of the helmet design the team has mostly worn since: white stripe bounded by two red, with the red oval and SF logo on the sides of the helmet. In 1964 the team's colors then changed again. All silver elements were changed to what was called "49er Gold", and the helmets were gold. New beige-gold pants with a red-white-red tri-stripe in the same style as the helmet were introduced. This basic design would be worn for practically the next 30 seasons with only some minor changes and adjustments, such as a gradual change from sans-serif to serifed block numerals from 1970 to 1974 and a switch from thin stripes to a very thick striping on the pants in 1976 (during which white jerseys were also worn at home for most of that season).

The uniform ensemble of red and white jerseys and beige-gold pants with thick striping was worn until 1995 with a few minor changes. During the 1994 season, many NFL teams wore "throwback uniforms" in occasional games to celebrate the NFL's 75th anniversary (a corresponding diamond-shaped 75th Anniversary patch was also worn by all teams). The 49ers chose to wear a version of their 1955 uniforms as their throwbacks, with simpler sans-serif block numerals that were outlined and shadowed in black with white pants with thinner red-black-red striping were also worn, along with the old striped red socks. The regular 1989–95 design gold helmet was worn with this uniform, as there was no logo on the 1955 helmet.

In 1996, the 49ers celebrated their 49th anniversary by designing a commemorative jersey patch based on the earlier shield-crest logo. The team also debuted a substantially new uniform design, most notably changing the shade of red used in their jerseys from bright scarlet to a deeper, cardinal red, and a black dropshadow effect (along with gold trim) was added to the jersey numerals (which remained in the blocked serif style).

As in 1994, the Niners donned white pants full-time for the 1996 season (also wearing them for the 1997 season and 1998 preseason,) though this time the pant stripes were marginally thicker and the colors were reversed to black-cardinal red-black (matching the striping on the helmets). For the 1998 regular-season opener, the team switched back to gold pants, with a more metallic gold rather than the previous beige-matte gold of the past. The striping along the side of the pants remained black-cardinal red-black, though a thin gold trimming was added, along with further oval "SF" logos placed on both sides of the hip.

The 1996 helmet and jersey design with the 1998 gold pants was worn as the team's regular uniforms until the end of the 2008 season. The 49ers once again changed uniforms in 2009, which are very similar to the classic design, albeit with several significant changes. The sleeve stripes are now set at an angle to accommodate the even shorter sleeves of modern jerseys, (though the stripes appear straight and parallel to the ground when worn by the players themselves).

An updated 49ers uniform with improved fit, and more breathable and moisture-resistant fabrics was debuted (alongside the rest of the NFL teams) by new league uniform manufacturer Nike on April 3, 2012.

On April 30, 2015, at their NFL draft rally, the team unveiled their first ever alternate uniform (as opposed to a throwback design). The uniform consists of black jerseys and pants with red numerals and striping. Nike logos are in gold, while the standard solid red socks will be worn. These uniforms will be worn a maximum of two games a year, per league rules.

In 2018, the 49ers unveiled a new alternate uniform, discarding their all-black alternates in favor of an all-white alternate. It was modeled after the 1994 uniform, with larger letters and numerals and more pronounced shadows. The helmets were solid gold, but were used with the old 49ers logo (no striping and shadows). They wear these uniforms once every season, normally on Alumni Day.

However, the 49ers wore the uniform once on the road, in their week 17 finale at Seattle in 2019. They also lobbied the NFL to wear them in Super Bowl LIV, but the request was denied, as the NFL requires teams to make such requests before the start of the regular season.

In 2021, the 49ers unveiled a red version of the 1994 throwback uniforms for use in select home games, with the white version now worn exclusively on the road.

In 2022, the 49ers unveiled a new version of the uniforms. This included a saloon font and a 3 stripe jersey.

In 2025, the 49ers unveiled a "Rivalries" uniform, which they would wear for three seasons at home against each of their NFC West opponents. The design is primarily black with saloon-style numbers in red with gold trim, and red stripes. Helmets are also black with gold facemasks and red stripes.

== Culture ==
=== Cheerleaders ===
The 49ers' official cheerleading squad is called the Gold Rush. Started in the early 1980s, the first squad consisted of 14 dancers.

In November 2018, shortly before the start of a game against the Oakland Raiders, a cheerleader for the San Francisco 49ers appeared to kneel during the US national anthem, becoming the first NFL cheerleader to do so. The act of kneeling during the national anthem began with the quarterback Colin Kaepernick to raise awareness about racism and police brutality.

=== Mascot ===
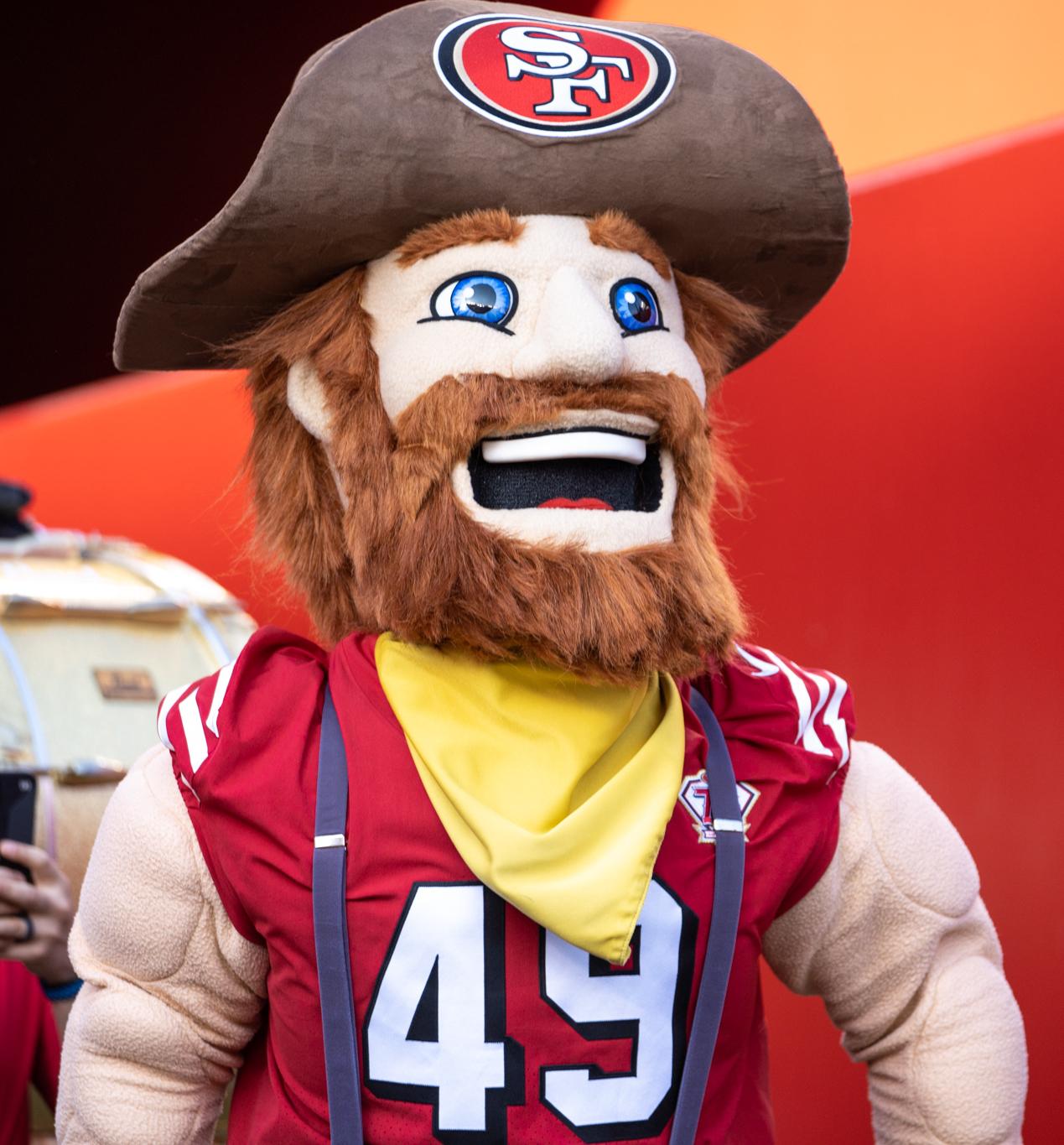
Sourdough Sam in September 2021

The 49ers' official mascot is Sourdough Sam. He wears jersey number 49.

=== Fans ===
49er fans often take pride in their longstanding devotion to the franchise, given their extensive franchise success dating back to the early 1980s. Their fans are often referred to as the 49er Faithful, Niner Gang, or utilizing the acronym FTTB, an abbreviation of Faithful To The Bay. A common chant utilized by fans in recent years is "Bang! Bang! Niner Gang!", popularized by Bay Area rapper E-40 in 2019.

== Rivalries ==
=== Divisional ===
==== Los Angeles Rams ====
The rivalry between the Los Angeles Rams and the San Francisco 49ers is considered by many to be one of the greatest NFL rivalries ever, placing No. 8 on Sports Illustrated's "Top 10 NFL Rivalries of All Time" list, compiled in 2008. After the Rams moved to St. Louis, Roger Craig stated in Tales from the San Francisco 49ers Sideline that the Rams would always remain the team's arch-rival, regardless of location. The Rams are the only team to have played the 49ers twice every season for the last 58 seasons to combine for more than 100 regular season games; the all-time regular season lead is held by the 49ers 72–67–3. The rivalry regained geographic animosity following their return to Los Angeles in 2016. The rivalry has also fostered a fierce element of animosity between fans, coaches, and players alike. The two teams have met twice in the postseason, both times in the NFC Championship Game. The first meeting came on January 14, 1990, when the 49ers crushed the Rams 30–3 at Candlestick Park to advance to the team's historic victory in Super Bowl XXIV. Both teams later met again on January 30, 2022, when the Rams rallied from a 10-point deficit in the fourth quarter to beat the 49ers 20–17 at SoFi Stadium, ending a 6-game loss-streak to the 49ers and ultimately proceeding to win Super Bowl LVI. As of 2024, the 49ers lead the all-time series 78-71-3.

==== Seattle Seahawks ====
During the 2010s, the Seattle Seahawks quickly grew an intense rivalry with the 49ers. The two teams began an exchange of heated regular season matchups following the NFL conference realignment in 2002 that relocated both teams into the same division. Prior to 2002, the teams played each other almost every season during the pre-season, but only every three years during the regular season as part of the league scheduling algorithm. The rivalry began to intensify after the 49ers hired Jim Harbaugh out of Stanford in 2011, as he and Seahawks and former USC head coach Pete Carroll had been involved in a lengthy feud. The matchups regularly grew in intensity through the 2010s, culminating in the two teams meeting in the 2013 NFC Championship Game, which saw Seattle advance and ultimately go on to win Super Bowl XLVIII. As of the 2023 season, the Seahawks lead the all-time series 31–23.

==== Arizona Cardinals ====
Though the 49ers and Cardinals initially met in 1951 and would meet occasionally until 2000, this would not develop into a full-fledged rivalry until both teams were placed in the NFC West division in 2002. Long-time quarterback Steve Young suffered a career-ending concussion in a game against the Cardinals on September 27, 1999, after taking a brutal hit from Arizona cornerback Aeneas Williams. While still a close rivalry in terms of overall total number of wins and record, there are periods or streaks that make the rivalry appear lopsided on both ends. After the 49ers won nine of ten meetings between 2009 and 2013, the Cardinals won eight straight meetings between 2014 and 2018. San Francisco currently leads the series 36–31.

The two teams have yet to meet in the playoffs.

=== Conference ===
==== Green Bay Packers ====
The Green Bay Packers rivalry emerged in the mid-1990s when the Packers upset the 49ers in the 1995 NFC Divisional game at Candlestick Park, ending any chance of a Super Bowl repeat. From that point, the Packers beat the 49ers four more times including two post-season games. San Francisco was finally able to exact revenge in the 1998 NFC Wild Card round, a game that is remembered for a 25-yard game-winning touchdown reception by Terrell Owens off a Steve Young pass (referred to by some as "The Catch II"), lifting the 49ers over the Packers 30–27. Since that game, the Packers had beaten the 49ers eight straight times including once in the 2001 post-season, a streak that came to an end in the 2012 season when the 49ers beat the Packers in Lambeau Field week 1 for the first time since 1990, and again in the NFC Divisional game that same season. In the 2019 season the 49ers and Packers met in the 2020 NFC Championship Game at Levi's Stadium. The 49ers won 37–20, but went on to lose Super Bowl LIV to the Kansas City Chiefs. The Packers also proceeded to lose to the 49ers in the Divisional Round in the 2021–2022 season. The 49ers trail the all-time series with a record of 34–39–1, though San Francisco holds a 6–4 lead in the postseason, winning the last five meetings.

==== Dallas Cowboys ====
The rivalry between the Dallas Cowboys and the 49ers has lasted since the 1970s. The NFL Top 10 ranked this rivalry to be the tenth best in NFL history. San Francisco has played Dallas in nine postseason games. The Cowboys defeated the 49ers in the 1970 and 1971 NFC Championship Games, and again in the 1972 Divisional Playoff Game. The 1981 NFC Championship Game in San Francisco, which saw the 49ers' Joe Montana complete a game-winning pass to Dwight Clark in the final minute (now known as The Catch), is one of the most famous games in NFL history. The rivalry became even more intense during the 1992–1994 seasons. San Francisco and Dallas faced each other in the NFC Championship Game three separate times. Dallas won the first two match-ups, and San Francisco won the third. In each of these pivotal match-ups, the game's victor went on to win the Super Bowl. Both the Cowboys and the 49ers are third all-time in Super Bowl victories to the Pittsburgh Steelers and New England Patriots with five each. The 49ers–Cowboys rivalry is also part of the larger cultural rivalry between California and Texas. In recent years, this once-great rivalry has greatly softened, with the struggles of both the Cowboys and 49ers. However, in its prime especially in the 1990s, this rivalry was a very bitter one as both teams were the class of the NFL during this time. In what was believed to be the greatest upset in the team's rivalry in the modern era, the 49ers upset the Cowboys in the 2021 Wild Card Round. The 2022 49ers would go on to continue their winning streak against the Cowboys winning the divisional round game 19–12. The Cowboys' loss to the 49ers was their seventh straight in the divisional round, which is the longest streak in the second round of the NFL playoffs. In Week 5 of 2023–24 season, the 49ers beat the Cowboys 42–10, making it the largest win margin for the 49ers in the history of the rivalry. The 49ers lead the all-time series at 21-19-1, although they trail the Cowboys 4–5 in the playoffs.

==== New York Giants ====
The New York Giants have the most playoff meetings versus the 49ers (eight). The playoff series is currently tied at four wins apiece, and in five of their eight meetings, the winning team has gone on to win the Super Bowl. This rivalry is rooted in the 1980s when both teams were on the rise. In the first two playoff meetings between these two teams, the Joe Montana-led 49ers won both meetings, 38–24 in 1981 and 21–10 in 1984 both in the divisional round at Candlestick Park; the 49ers went on to win their first two Super Bowl championships both seasons. The Giants won the next three playoff meetings, which included a 49–3 rout at Giants Stadium in 1986, and the 1990 NFC Championship Game, where they upset the 49ers 15–13, ruining the 49ers hopes of a Super Bowl three-peat after Roger Craig lost a fumble late in the fourth quarter and let the Giants score on a last-second field goal. Giants also went on to win their first two Super Bowl championships both seasons. The 49ers defeated the Giants 44–3 in 1993 in the divisional round. In the 2002 NFC wildcard game, the Giants were ahead 38–14 late in the third quarter; however, the 49ers came back from the 24-point deficit to beat the Giants with a 39–38 victory. The teams met again in the 2011 NFC Championship Game at Candlestick Park, and just like the 1990 NFC Championship, it was a low-scoring game; the Giants won the game on a Lawrence Tynes 31-yard field goal in overtime, 20–17. In an eerie similarity to Roger Craig's fumble 21 years earlier, Kyle Williams fumbled a punt in the crucial minutes of the game, and just like the last two times, the Giants beat the 49ers in the playoffs, they went on to win the Super Bowl. San Francisco leads the all-time series 22–21.

=== Historic ===
==== Atlanta Falcons ====
The Atlanta Falcons were also division rivals with the 49ers until the Falcons moved to the NFC South in 2002 after the realignment. Just like the Saints, the 49ers had dominated the Falcons when they played in the NFC West, but the Falcons won their first four games (spanning nine seasons) against the 49ers since moving to the NFC South. Both teams met in the divisional round of the 1998 playoffs. Garrison Hearst suffered an ankle break after his foot was caught in the Georgia Dome turf and twisted severely as he tried to spin away from Falcons' defensive end Chuck Smith on the first play from scrimmage; the 49ers lost that game 20–18. They met in the 2012 NFC Championship, in which the 49ers, led by quarterback Colin Kaepernick, defeated the top-seeded Falcons in Atlanta by a score of 28–24. The next year, the Falcons played against the 49ers in the final home game at Candlestick Park ever. The game ended in a dramatic interception return for a touchdown by 49ers linebacker NaVorro Bowman, known as "The Pick at the 'Stick". The 49ers maintain an overall 48–33–1 against the Falcons, but are tied 1–1 in the postseason.

==== Oakland Raiders ====
The Oakland Raiders were the 49ers' geographic rivals when the Raiders were located in Oakland. As a result, games between the two were referred to as the "Battle of the Bay". The first exhibition game played in 1967, ended with the NFL 49ers defeating the AFL Raiders 13–10. After the 1970 merger, the 49ers won in Oakland 38–7. The rivalry still remained heated when the Raiders moved to Los Angeles, leaving many Raider fans in Northern California bitter over the move, and some of them becoming 49er fans, added with the antagonism between Northern and Southern California. The Raiders notably upset the defending Super Bowl champion 49ers in San Francisco in 1982, winning 23–17. In addition, both teams have shared a number of players, most notably Jim Plunkett, Jerry Rice, Ronnie Lott, Michael Crabtree, Tom Rathman, and Charlie Garner.

On August 20, 2011, in the third week of the pre-season, the pre-season game between the rivals was marked by fights in restrooms and the stands at Candlestick Park, including a shooting outside the stadium in which several were injured. The NFL decided to cancel all future pre-season games between the Raiders and 49ers. The final regular season matchup of the "Battle of the Bay" was won by San Francisco by a score of 34–3 on November 1, 2018, leaving the series tied 7–7. In 2020, the Raiders began playing their home games at Allegiant Stadium in Las Vegas, effectively ending the geographic rivalry. The San Francisco 49ers met with the Raiders in Las Vegas for the first time on January 1, 2023, taking a slim overtime win with a field goal to end the game 37–34. The 49ers lead the all-time series 8–7.

==== Cleveland Browns ====
In the AAFC, the only other competitive team other than the 49ers was the Cleveland Browns, who they played twice each of the four years the league was in service; Cleveland lost four games in the AAFC, and San Francisco was responsible for two of them, including the one that broke a 29-game streak where Cleveland did not lose a game. The final game in AAFC history matched the two for the AAFC Championship, which Cleveland won 21–7. The rivalry did not last into the NFL years, particularly after the teams were placed in opposite conferences in 1970. The rivalry has turned into a friendly relationship as many 49ers personnel helped the Browns relaunch in 1999, specifically former 49ers president and CEO Carmen Policy and vice president/director of football operations Dwight Clark, who were hired by the expansion Browns in the same roles. In addition, 49ers owners John York and Denise DeBartolo York reside in Youngstown, 60 miles (97 km) southeast of Cleveland. Long-time Browns placekicker and fan favorite Phil Dawson and backup quarterback Colt McCoy signed with the 49ers in 2014. The Browns currently lead the all-time series 20–10.

== Season-by-season records ==
This is a partial list of the 49ers' last five completed seasons. For the full season-by-season franchise results, see List of San Francisco 49ers seasons.

Super Bowl champions^{†}	Conference champions^{*}	Division champions^{^}	Wild Card berth^{#}	One-game playoff berth^{+}

As of January 19, 2024

Season	Team	League	Conference	Division	Regular season				Postseason results	Awards
Season	Team	League	Conference	Division	Finish	Wins	Losses	Ties	Postseason results	Awards
2021	2021	NFL	NFC	West	3rd#	10	7	0	Won Wild Card Round (at Cowboys) 23–17; Won NFC Divisional playoffs (at Packers) 13–10; Lost NFC Championship (at Rams) 17–20	–
2022	2022	NFL	NFC	West^{^}	1st^{^}	13	4	0	Won Wild Card Round (Seattle) 23–41; Won NFC Divisional playoffs (Cowboys) 12–19; Lost NFC Championship (at Philadelphia) 7–31	Nick Bosa (DPOY)
2023	2023	NFL	NFC^{*}	West^{^}	1st^{^}	12	5	0	Won Divisional Playoffs (Packers) 24–21; Won NFC Championship (Lions) 34–31; Lost Super Bowl LVIII (vs. Chiefs) 25–22 (OT)	Christian McCaffrey (OPOY)
2024	2024	NFL	NFC	West	4th	6	11	0	–	–
2025	2025	NFL	NFC	West	3rd#	12	5	0	Won Wild Card Round (at Eagles) 23–19; Lost Divisional playoffs (at Seahawks) 6–41	–

== Home stadiums ==
- Kezar Stadium (1946–1970)
- Candlestick Park (1971–2013)
  - Stanford Stadium (1989 for one game due to the Loma Prieta earthquake)
- Levi's Stadium (2014–present)
  - State Farm Stadium (2020 for three games due to restrictions related to the COVID-19 pandemic in the San Francisco Bay Area)

== Current roster ==
San Francisco 49ers roster
Quarterbacks (QB): 10 Mac Jones; 13 Brock Purdy; 14 Kurtis Rourke; Running backs (RB): 26 Kaelon Black; 29 Jordan James; 44 Kyle Juszczyk FB; 23 Christian McCaffrey; Wide receivers (WR): 3 Keenan Allen; 84 Brandin Cooks; 4 Jacob Cowing PR; 5 Mike Evans; 11 Demarcus Robinson; 19 Deebo Samuel KR; 17 Jordan Watkins; Tight ends (TE): 89 Luke Farrell; 85 George Kittle; 9 Brayden Willis	Offensive linemen (OL): 64 Jake Brendel C; 75 Connor Colby G; 69 Enrique Cruz Jr. T; 76 Vederian Lowe T; 68 Colton McKivitz T; 58 Jarrett Patterson C; 77 Dominick Puni G; 71 Trent Williams T; 74 Carver Willis G; Defensive linemen (DL): 97 Nick Bosa DE; 99 DeForest Buckner DT; 94 Romello Height DE; 47 Khalid Kareem DE; 92 Osa Odighizuwa DT; 96 James Thompson Jr. DT; 55 Sebastian Valdez DT; 56 Keion White DE; 98 Mykel Williams DE	Linebackers (LB): 48 Tatum Bethune; 53 Jaden Dugger; 51 Luke Gifford; 57 Dre Greenlaw; 49 Garret Wallow; 54 Fred Warner; Defensive backs (DB): 27 Ji'Ayir Brown S; 24 Ashtyn Davis S; 0 Renardo Green CB; 2 Deommodore Lenoir CB; 6 Malik Mustapha S; 33 Siran Neal S; 28 Ephesians Prysock CB; 36 Marques Sigle S; 20 Upton Stout CB; Special teams (ST): 18 Eddy Piñeiro K; 15 Corliss Waitman P; 46 Jon Weeks LS	Practice squad: 67 Isaac Alarcón T (IPP); 50 Robert Beal Jr. DE; 40 Brandon Codrington CB; 82 Khalil Dinkins TE; 63 Viliami Fehoko DE; 41 Jalen Graham LB; 81 Wesley Grimes WR; 86 KhaDarel Hodge WR; 65 McKinnley Jackson DT; 25 Jack Jones CB; 35 Sincere McCormick RB; 66 Drake Nugent C; 59 Ogbo Okoronkwo DE; 18 Will Pauling WR; 61 Foster Sarell T; 83 Jack Stoll TE; 38 Jalen Stroman S; Reserve: -- Brandon Aiyuk WR (Left squad); 95 Alfred Collins DT (IR); 50 Andrew Farmer DE (IR); 29 Darrick Forrest S (IR); 31 Isaac Guerendo RB (PUP); 93 Gracen Halton DT (IR); 22 Nate Hobbs CB (IR); 59 Mikail Kamara DE (IR); 3 Christian Kirk WR (IR); 45 Nick Martin LB (IR); 91 Sam Okuayinonu DE (IR); 1 Ricky Pearsall WR (IR); 62 Austen Pleasants T (IR); 7 De'Zhaun Stribling WR (IR); 88 Jake Tonges TE (IR); 90 CJ West DT (IR); 63 Nick Zakelj G (IR) 53 active, 16 practice squad (1 IPP), 17 reserve As of November 11, 2026. Rookies in italics.; Roster; Depth chart; Transactions

== Players of note ==
=== Pro Football Hall of Famers ===
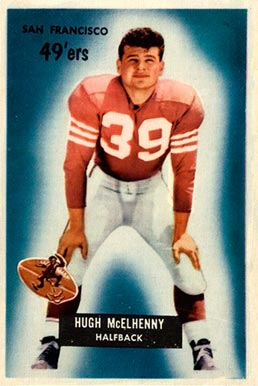
Hall of Fame RB Hugh McElhenny

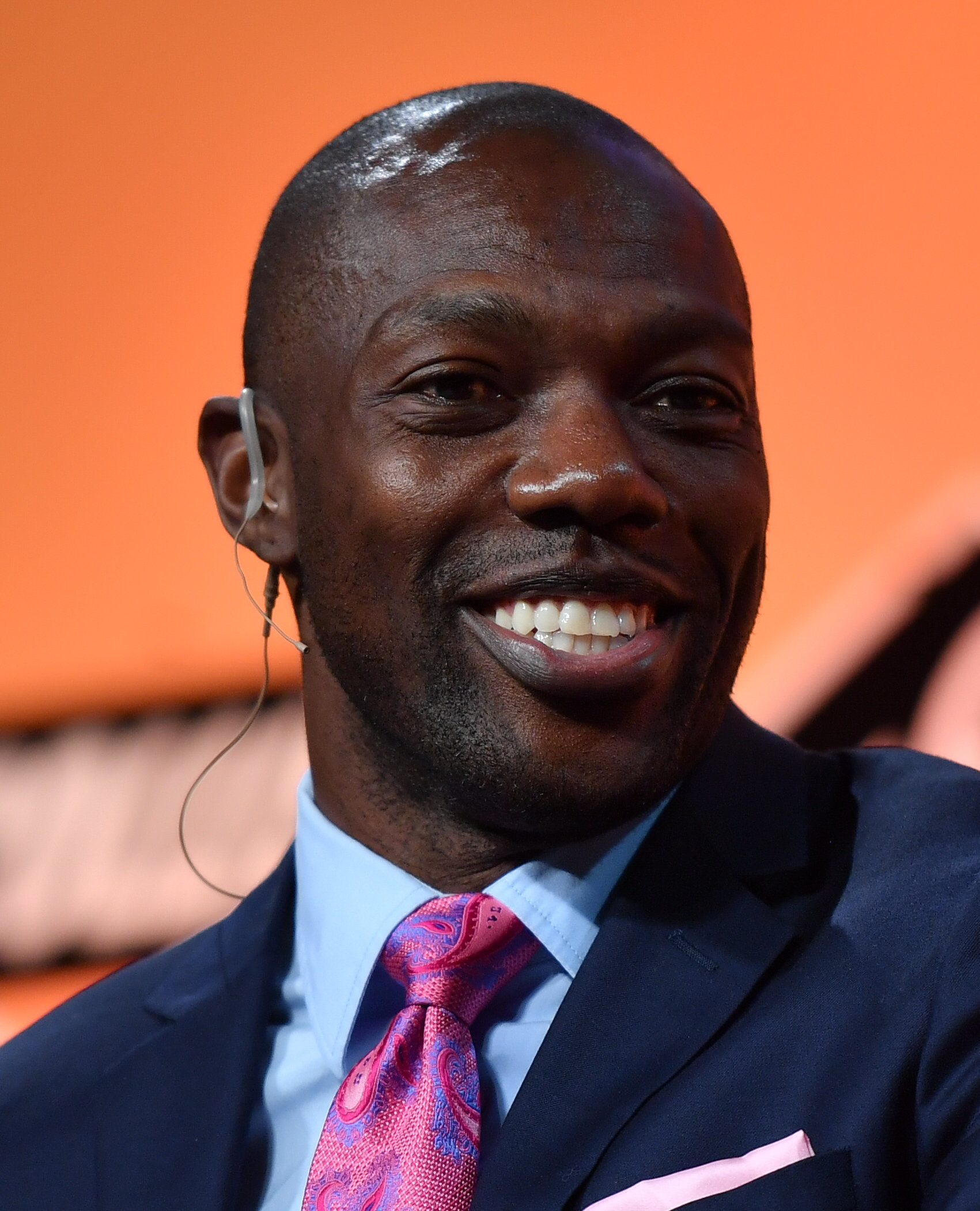
Hall of Fame WR Terrell Owens

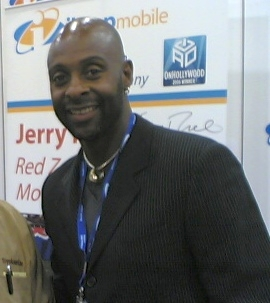
Hall of Fame WR Jerry Rice

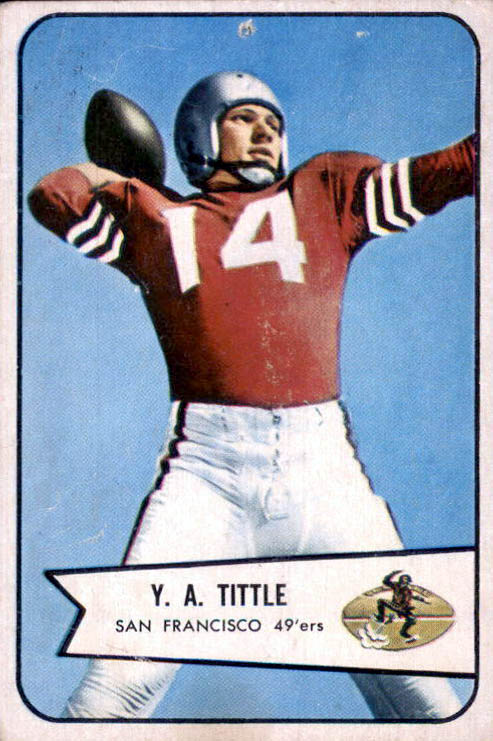
Hall of Fame QB Y.A. Tittle

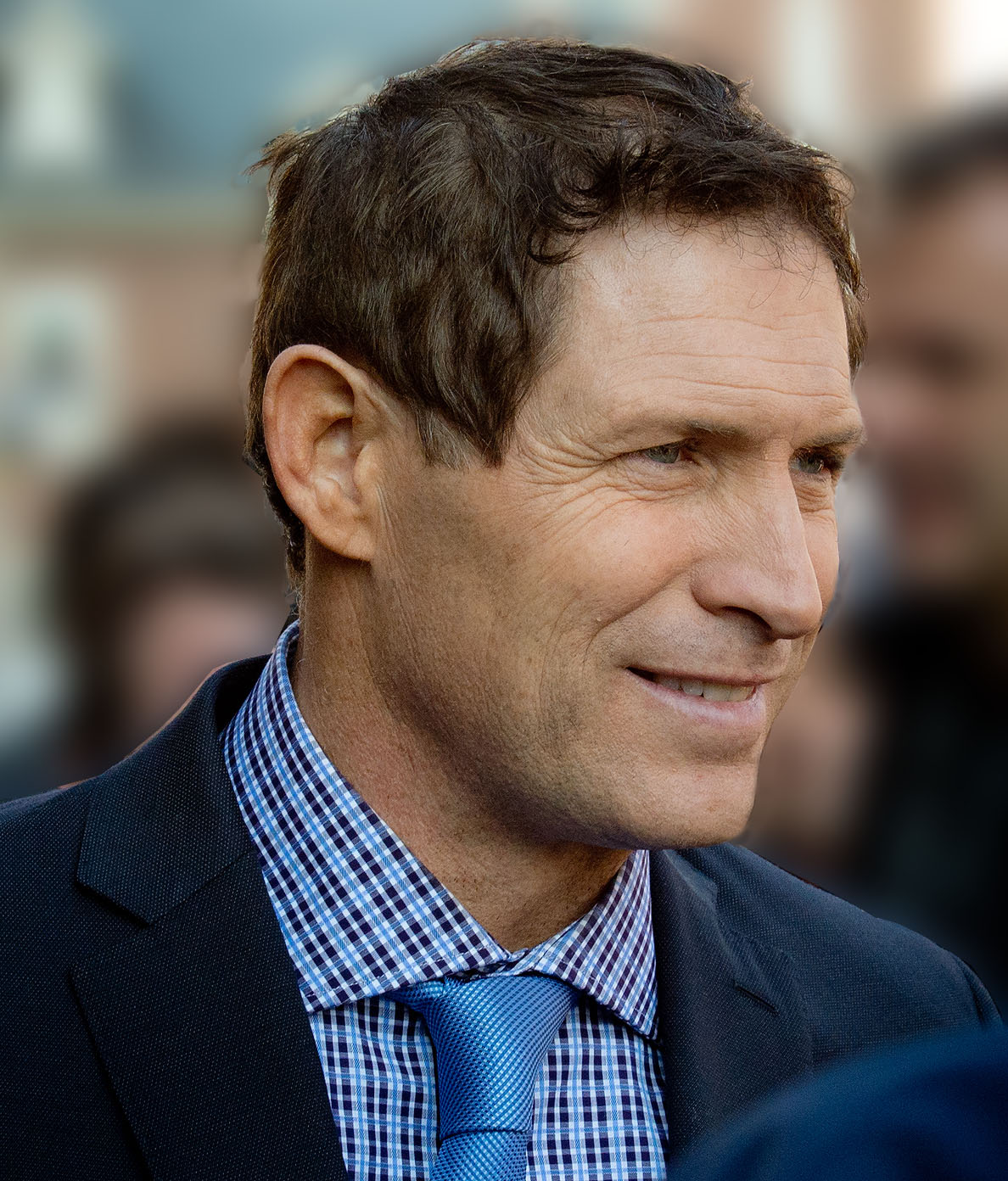
Hall of Fame QB Steve Young

San Francisco 49ers in the Pro Football Hall of Fame
Players
No.	Name	Inducted	Position(s)	Tenure
8	**Steve Young**	2005	QB	1987–1999
14	**Y. A. Tittle**	1971	QB	1951–1960
16	**Joe Montana**	2000	QB	1979–1992
21	Deion Sanders	2011	CB	1994
22	Bob Hayes	2009	WR	1975
26	Rod Woodson	2009	S / CB	1997
32	O. J. Simpson	1985	RB	1978–1979
33	**Roger Craig**	2026	RB	1983–1990
34	**Joe Perry**	1969	RB	1948–1960, 1963
35	John Henry Johnson	1987	FB	1954–1956
37	**Jimmy Johnson**	1994	CB / WR	1961–1976
39	**Hugh McElhenny**	1970	RB	1952–1960
42	**Ronnie Lott**	2000	S / CB	1981–1990
52	**Patrick Willis**	2024	LB	2007–2014
56	Chris Doleman	2012	DE	1996–1998
57	Rickey Jackson	2010	DE	1994–1995
64	**Dave Wilcox**	2000	LB	1964–1974
71	Larry Allen	2013	G	2006–2007
73	**Leo Nomellini**	1969	DT / OT	1949–1963
74	**Fred Dean**	2008	DE	1981–1985
79	**Bob St. Clair**	1990	OT	1953–1963
80	**Jerry Rice**	2010	WR	1985–2000
81	**Terrell Owens**	2018	WR	1996–2003
84	Randy Moss	2018	WR	2012
88	Isaac Bruce	2020	WR	2008–2009
91	Kevin Greene	2016	DE / LB	1997
95	Richard Dent	2011	DE	1994
94; 95	**Charles Haley**	2015	DE / LB	1986–1991; 1998–1999
97	**Bryant Young**	2022	DT	1994–2007
Coaches and Contributors
Name		Inducted	Position(s)	Tenure
**Edward J. DeBartolo Jr.**		2016	Owner	1977–2000
**Bill Walsh**		1993	Head coach	1979–1988 (Head); 1999–2001 (VP and GM); 2002–2004 (Consultant)
Gil Brandt		2019	Executive	1958–1959

=== Retired numbers ===
San Francisco 49ers retired numbers
No.	Player	Position	Tenure	Retired
8	Steve Young	QB	1987–1999	October 5, 2008
12	John Brodie^{*}	QB	1957–1973	1973
16	Joe Montana	QB	1979–1992	December 15, 1997
34	Joe Perry	FB	1948–1960, 1963	1971
37	Jimmy Johnson	CB / WR	1961–1976	1977
39	Hugh McElhenny	RB	1952–1960	1971
42	Ronnie Lott	S / CB	1981–1990	November 17, 2003
70	Charlie Krueger	DT	1959–1973	1974
73	Leo Nomellini	DT / OT	1950–1963	1971
79	Bob St. Clair	OT	1953–1963	December 2, 2001
80	Jerry Rice	WR	1985–2000	September 20, 2010
87	Dwight Clark	WR	1979–1987	1988

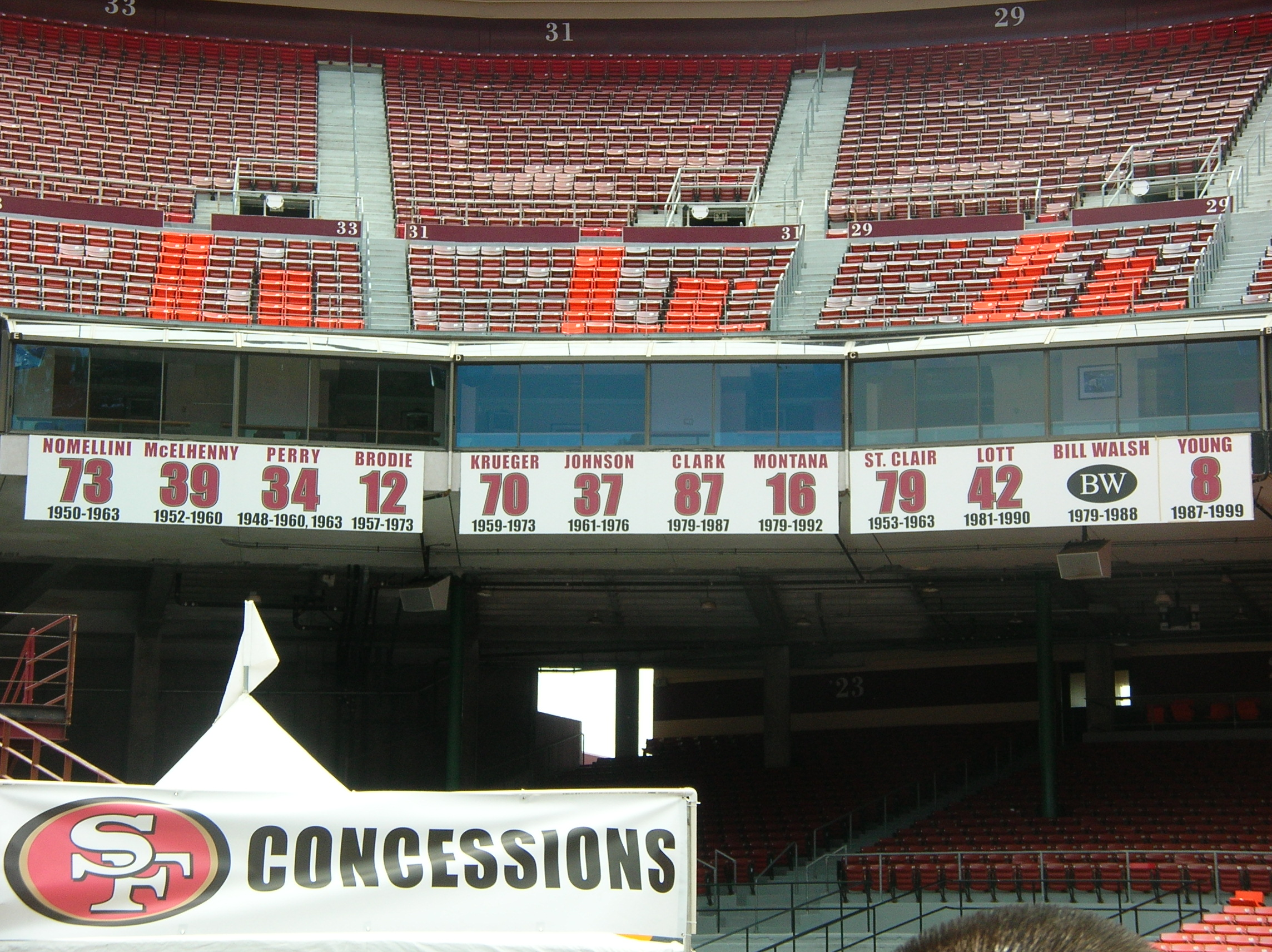
The 49ers' retired numbers displayed on the southeastern side of Candlestick Park in June 2009

^{*} During his tenure with the 49ers from 2006 to 2007, quarterback Trent Dilfer, a long-time friend of Brodie, wore No. 12 with his permission, unofficially unretiring the number as a tribute.

=== 49ers Hall of Fame ===
The Edward J. DeBartolo Sr. 49ers Hall of Fame is the team's official hall of honor for the franchise's greatest players and contributors.

Elected to the Pro Football Hall of Fame

**49ers Hall of Fame**
Year	No.	Name	Position(s)	Tenure
2009	8	Steve Young	QB	1987–1999
2009	12	John Brodie	QB	1957–1973
2009	14	Y. A. Tittle	QB	1951–1960
2009	16	Joe Montana	QB	1979–1992
2009	34	Joe Perry	RB	1948–1960, 1963
2009	35	John Henry Johnson	RB	1954–1956
2009	37	Jimmy Johnson	CB	1961–1976
2009	39	Hugh McElhenny	RB	1952–1960
2009	42	Ronnie Lott	CB	1981–1990
2009	64	Dave Wilcox	LB	1964–1974
2009	70	Charlie Krueger	DT	1959–1973
2009	73	Leo Nomellini	DT / OT	1950–1963
2009	74	Fred Dean	DE	1981–1985
2009	79	Bob St. Clair	OT	1953–1963
2009	87	Dwight Clark	WR	1979–1987
2009	–	Edward DeBartolo Jr.	Owner	1978–2000
2009	–	Bill Walsh	Coach	1979–1988
2010	80	Jerry Rice	WR	1985–2000
2010	–	Tony Morabito	Founder	1946–1957
2010	–	Vic Morabito	Owner	1946–1964
2011	27	R.C. Owens	WR	1957–1961
2011	33	Roger Craig	RB	1983–1990
2012	82	Gordon Soltau	WR	1949–1958
2013	–	John McVay	Executive	1980–1995; 1998–1999
2014	–	George Seifert	DB coach Defensive coordinator Head coach	1980–1982; 1983–1988; 1989–1996
2015	94/95	Charles Haley	OLB	1986–1991; 1998–1999
2017	44	Tom Rathman	FB; RB coach	1986–1993; 1997–2002, 2009–2016
2019	81	Terrell Owens	WR	1996–2003
2020	97	Bryant Young	DT	1994–2007
2021	82	John Taylor	WR / KR	1987–1995
2021	52	Patrick Willis	LB	2007–2014
2024	21	Frank Gore	RB	2005–2014
2025	88/84	Brent Jones	TE	1987–1997

=== Forty-Niner 10-year club ===
The 10-year club is a shrine that honors members of the San Francisco 49ers who played 10 or more seasons with the organization, and was started by Bill Walsh to recognize players that have shown longevity, success and consistency. Each member is shown in a black-and-white photo on a scarlet and gold plaque with their name under the photo and the years in which they played. A plaque placed in the center of the photos of club members reads:

"Forty-Niners 10-year club. Dedicated to those Forty-Niners who have served 10 or more years proudly wearing the scarlet and gold."

Bold indicates those elected to the Pro Football Hall of Fame.

**1940s/1950s**
No.	Player	Position	Tenure
34	**Joe Perry**	FB	1948–60, 1963
73	**Leo Nomellini**	DT / OT	1949–63
14	**Y. A. Tittle**	QB	1951–60
52/84	Billy Wilson	WR	1951–60
79	**Bob St. Clair**	OT	1953–64
55	Matt Hazeltine	LB	1955–68
77	Bruce Bosley	G/C	1956–68
78	John Thomas	OT	1958–67

**1960s**
No.	Player	Position	Tenure
12	John Brodie	QB	1957–73
36	Tommy Davis	K, P	1959–69
70	Charlie Krueger	DE	1959–73
76	Len Rohde	T	1960–74
60	Roland Lakes	DT	1959–73
37	**Jimmy Johnson**	CB / WR	1961–76
64	**Dave Wilcox**	LB	1964–74
32	Mel Phillips	S	1966–76
57	Frank Nunley	LB	1967–76

**1970s**
No.	Player	Position	Tenure
69	Woody Peoples	G	1968–77
51/62	Randy Cross	G/C	1976–88
68	John Ayers	G	1976–86
14	Ray Wersching	K	1977–87
79	Cas Banaszek	T	1968–77
53	Tommy Hart	DE	1968–77
52	Skip Vanderbundt	LB	1968–77
86	Cedrick Hardman	DE	1970–79
59	Willie Harper	WR	1973–83
71/89	Keith Fahnhorst	T	1974–87

**1980s**
No.	Player	Position	Tenure
99	Mike Walter	LB	1984–93
61	Jesse Sapolu	C/G	1983–97
62	Guy McIntyre	G	1984–93
80	**Jerry Rice**	WR	1985–2000
82	John Taylor	WR	1986–95
74	Steve Wallace	T	1986–96
56	Fred Quillan	C	1978–87
76	Dwaine Board	DE	1979–88
21	Eric Wright	CB	1981–90
42	**Ronnie Lott**	S	1981–90
58	Keena Turner	LB	1980–90
85	Mike Wilson	WR	1981–90
16	**Joe Montana**	QB	1979–92

**1990s**
No.	Player	Position	Tenure
8	**Steve Young**	QB	1987–99
79	Harris Barton	OT	1987–98
84/88	Brent Jones	TE	1987–97

**2000s**
No.	Player	Position	Tenure
97	**Bryant Young**	DT	1994–2007
53	Jeff Ulbrich	LB	2000–2009
63	Derrick Deese	G	1992–2003
86	Brian Jennings	LS	2000–2012
4	Andy Lee	P	2004–2014
21	Frank Gore	RB	2005–2014
85	Vernon Davis	TE	2006–2015
74	Joe Staley	OT	2007–2019

=== Records ===
All-Time 49ers leaders
Leader	Player	Record Number	Years on 49ers	Refs
Passing	Joe Montana	35,124 passing yards	1979–92	
Rushing	Frank Gore	11,073 rushing yards	2005–14	
Receiving	Jerry Rice	19,247 receiving yards	1985–2000	
Coaching wins	George Seifert	98 wins	1989–96	

== Current staff ==
San Francisco 49ers staff
Front office: Co-chairmen – John and Denise DeBartolo York; Principal owner – Jed York; Chief executive officer – Al Guido; President of football operations/general manager – John Lynch; Vice president and senior advisor – Keena Turner; Assistant general manager – Brian Hampton; Assistant general manager – RJ Gillen; Vice president of player personnel – Tariq Ahmad; Director of scouting and football operations – Josh Williams; Director of college scouting – Dominic DeCicco; Associate director of college scouting – Justin Chabot; Director of pro scouting – Fred Gammage III; Vice president of football R&D – Matt Ploenzke, PhD; Manager, football R&D – Shravan Ramamurthy; Senior personnel advisor – Frank Gore; Personnel executive – Ethan Waugh; Vice president of personnel & strategy – Kwesi Adofo-Mensah; Head coaches: Head coach – Kyle Shanahan; Assistant head coach/offensive line – Chris Foerster; Assistant head coach/defense – Matt Eberflus; Offensive coaches: Offensive coordinator – Klay Kubiak; Run game coordinator – Joe Graves; Quarterbacks – Mick Lombardi; Running backs – Robert Turner Jr; Passing game coordinator/wide receivers – Leonard Hankerson; Tight ends – Cameron Clemmons; Assistant offensive line – Roman Sapolu; Offensive assistant/wide receivers – Andrew Hayes-Stoker; Offensive assistant – Miguel Reveles; Offensive assistant/tight ends – Deuce Schwartz; Offensive assistant/quarterbacks – Jacob Webster	Defensive coaches: Defensive coordinator – Raheem Morris; Defensive pass game coordinator – Jerry Gray; Defensive run game coordinator – Johnny Holland; Defensive line – Kris Kocurek; Assistant defensive line – Greg Scruggs; Linebackers – K. J. Wright; Defensive backs/cornerbacks – Ray Brown; Defensive quality control – Cameron Brown; Defensive quality control – Jake Lynch; Defensive quality control – Angel Matute; Special teams coaches: Special teams coordinator – Brant Boyer; Assistant special teams – Colt Anderson; Special teams quality control – Ronald Blair III; Coaching operations/support staff: Chief of staff/football – Patrick Hagedorn; Coaching operations assistant – Max Molz; Seasonal coaching assistant – Micah Foerster; Strength and conditioning: Vice president, player health & performance – Dustin Perry; Head strength and conditioning – Mike Nicolini; Assistant strength and conditioning – Jordan Nieuwsma; Assistant strength and conditioning – Greg Segrove; Assistant strength and conditioning – Chauncey Scissum; → Coaching staff → Front office → More NFL staffs

== Achievements ==
=== Individual awards ===
NFL MVP
Season	Player	Position
1970	John Brodie	QB
1989	Joe Montana	QB
1990	Joe Montana	QB
1992	Steve Young	QB
1994	Steve Young	QB

NFL Offensive Player of the Year
Season	Player	Position
1987	Jerry Rice	WR
1988	Roger Craig	RB
1989	Joe Montana	QB
1992	Steve Young	QB
1993	Jerry Rice	WR
2023	Christian McCaffrey	RB

NFL Defensive Player of the Year
Season	Player	Position
1994	Deion Sanders	CB
1997	Dana Stubblefield	DT
2022	Nick Bosa	DE

NFL Defensive Rookie of the Year
Season	Player	Position
1970	Bruce Taylor	CB
1993	Dana Stubblefield	DT
2007	Patrick Willis	LB
2019	Nick Bosa	DE

Super Bowl MVP
Super Bowl	Player	Position
XVI	Joe Montana	QB
XIX	Joe Montana	QB
XXIII	Jerry Rice	WR
XXIV	Joe Montana	QB
XXIX	Steve Young	QB

NFL Coach of the Year
Season	Coach
1981	Bill Walsh
2011	Jim Harbaugh

NFL Comeback Player of the Year
Season	Player	Position
1986	Joe Montana	QB
1999	Bryant Young	DT
2001	Garrison Hearst	RB
2025	Christian McCaffrey	RB

NFL Executive of the Year
Season	Executive
1994	Carmen Policy
2011	Trent Baalke
2019	John Lynch

== See also ==
- List of Super Bowl records
- San Francisco 49ers draft history
- Sports in the San Francisco Bay Area
- List of National Football League records (team)
- List of professional sports teams in California

Preceded by Oakland Raiders	Super Bowl champions 1981 (XVI)	Succeeded by Washington Redskins
Preceded by Los Angeles Raiders	Super Bowl champions 1984 (XIX)	Succeeded by Chicago Bears
Preceded by Washington Redskins	Super Bowl champions 1988 (XXIII), 1989 (XXIV)	Succeeded by New York Giants
Preceded by Dallas Cowboys	Super Bowl champions 1994 (XXIX)	Succeeded by Dallas Cowboys
