= 1967 San Francisco 49ers season =

American football team season

- Owner: Josephine Morabito; Jane Morabito
- General manager: Louis Spadia
- Head coach: Jack Christiansen
- Home stadium: Kezar Stadium

Results
- Record: 7–7
- Division place: 3rd NFL Coastal
- Playoffs: Did not qualify

The 1967 San Francisco 49ers season was the franchise's 18th season in the National Football League, their 22nd overall, and their fifth and final season under head coach Jack Christiansen, who was let go following the end of the season. The 49ers had two first-round picks and drafted Heisman Trophy winner Steve Spurrier with one of those draft picks.

The 49ers attempted to improve on their record from the previous season and make the playoffs for the first time in 9 years. Despite starting 5–1, the 49ers would win only 2 of their last 8 games, and ultimately ended their season 7–7, missing the playoffs for the 10th straight year.

== Offseason ==
=== NFL draft ===
1967 San Francisco 49ers draft
Round	Pick	Player	Position	College	Notes
1	3	Steve Spurrier	Quarterback	Florida	
1	11	Cas Banaszek	Tackle	Northwestern	Career began in 1968
2	39	Tom Holzer	Defensive end	Louisville	
3	62	Frank Nunley	Linebacker	Michigan	
3	65	Bill Tucker	Running back	Tennessee State	
4	91	Wayne Trimble	Defensive back	Alabama	
6	145	Doug Cunningham	Running back	Ole Miss	
7	170	Milt Jackson	Defensive back	Tulsa	
8	198	Walter Johnson	Defensive end	Tuskegee	
9	223	Bob Briggs	Defensive end	Heidelberg	
10	248	Chip Myers *	Wide receiver	Northwestern Oklahoma State	
11	276	Ken Carmann	Defensive tackle	Kearney State	
12	301	James Hall	Linebacker	Tuskegee	
13	325	Rich Gibbs	Defensive back	Iowa	
14	354	Dalton Leblanc	Wide receiver	Northeast Louisiana	
15	379	Clarence Spencer	Wide receiver	Louisville	
16	404	Bart Templeman	Center	Eastern Montana	
17	432	Danny Talbott	Quarterback	North Carolina	
Made roster * Made at least one Pro Bowl during career

== Personnel ==
=== Staff / Coaches ===
1967 San Francisco 49ers staff
Front office: Team Owner(s) - Josephine Morabito & Jane Morabito; General manager / Team President – Louis Spadia; Personnel Scout - Dick Gallagher; Head coaches: Head coach - Jack Christiansen; Offensive coaches: Chief of Offense / Offensive Coordinator - Bill Johnson; Offensive Ends – Billy Wilson; Offensive Consultant – Y.A. Tittle	Defensive coaches: Defensive Assistant – Don Colchico; Defensive Assistant – Dick Voris; Defensive Backfield / Secondary – Jim Shofner; Special teams coaches: None - N/A

=== Roster ===
1967 San Francisco 49ers roster
Quarterbacks (QB): 12 John Brodie; 10 George Mira; 11 Steve Spurrier P; Running backs (RB): 44 John David Crow; 42 Doug Cunningham; 43 David Kopay; 22 Gary Lewis; 45 Bill Tucker; 40 Ken Willard; Wide receivers (WR): 46 Chip Myers; 83 Sonny Randle; 88 Dick Witcher; Tight ends (TE): 84 Dave Olerich; 89 Bob Windsor	Offensive linemen (OL): 77 Bruce Bosley C; 56 Joe Cerne C; 66 Elmer Collett G; 62 Dave Hettema T; 68 Howard Mudd G; 63 Don Parker G; 67 Walt Rock T; 76 Len Rohde T; Defensive linemen (DL): 80 Stan Hindman DE; 87 Tom Holzer DE; 72 Charlie Johnson DT; 58 Walter Johnson DE; 70 Charlie Krueger DT; 60 Roland Lakes DT	Linebackers (LB): 50 Ed Beard MLB; 54 Bob Harrison MLB; 55 Matt Hazeltine OLB; 57 Frank Nunley OLB; 64 Dave Wilcox OLB; Defensive backs (DB): 20 George Donnelly FS; 35 Goose Gonsoulin FS; 38 Jim Jackson CB; 32 Mel Phillips CB; 27 Al Randolph SS; 24 Wayne Trimble CB; Special teams (ST): 36 Tommy Davis K	Reserve: 39 Kermit Alexander CB (IR); 79 Cas Banaszek T (IR); 86 Dan Colchico DE (IR); 37 Jimmy Johnson CB (IR); 26 Kay McFarland WR (IR); 74 Clark Miller DE (IR); 81 Dave Parks WR (IR); 85 Monty Stickles TE (IR); 23 Wayne Swinford CB (IR); 78 John Thomas G (IR); Rookies in italics

== Preseason ==
Week	Date	Opponent	Result	Record	Venue
1	August 13	Cleveland Browns	W 42–14	1–0	Kezar Stadium
2	August 20	Dallas Cowboys	L 24–30	1–1	Kezar Stadium
3	August 26	vs. New Orleans Saints	L 10–24	1–2	Multnomah Stadium
4	September 3	Oakland Raiders (AFL)	W 13–10	2–3	Oakland-Alameda County Coliseum
5	September 9	at Los Angeles Rams	L 7–34	2–4	Los Angeles Memorial Coliseum

== Regular season ==
=== Schedule ===
Week	Date	Opponent	Result	Record	Venue	Attendance
1	September 17	at Minnesota Vikings	**W** 27–21	1–0	Metropolitan Stadium	39,638
2	September 24	**Atlanta Falcons**	**W** 38–7	2–0	Kezar Stadium	30,207
3	October 1	at **Baltimore Colts**	**L** 7–41	2–1	Memorial Stadium	60,238
4	October 8	at **Los Angeles Rams**	**W** 27–24	3–1	Los Angeles Memorial Coliseum	60,424
5	October 15	at Philadelphia Eagles	**W** 28–27	4–1	Franklin Field	60,825
6	October 22	New Orleans Saints	**W** 27–13	5–1	Kezar Stadium	34,285
7	October 29	Detroit Lions	**L** 3–45	5–2	Kezar Stadium	37,990
8	November 5	**Los Angeles Rams**	**L** 7–17	5–3	Kezar Stadium	53,194
9	November 12	at Washington Redskins	**L** 28–31	5–4	D.C. Stadium	50,326
10	November 19	at Green Bay Packers	**L** 0–13	5–5	Lambeau Field	50,861
11	November 26	**Baltimore Colts**	**L** 9–26	5–6	Kezar Stadium	44,815
12	December 3	Chicago Bears	**L** 14–28	5–7	Kezar Stadium	25,613
13	December 10	at **Atlanta Falcons**	**W** 34–28	6–7	Atlanta Stadium	51,798
14	December 16	Dallas Cowboys	**W** 24–16	7–7	Kezar Stadium	27,182
Note: Intra-division opponents are in **bold** text.

=== Game summaries ===
==== Week 14: vs. Dallas Cowboys ====
Team	1	2	3	4	Total
Cowboys	3	0	0	13	16
• 49ers	7	14	3	0	24

- Date: December 16
- Location: Kezar Stadium

=== Standings ===
NFL Coastal
	W	L	T	PCT	DIV	CONF	PF	PA	STK
Los Angeles Rams	11	1	2	.917	4–1–1	8–1–1	398	196	W8
Baltimore Colts	11	1	2	.917	4–1–1	7–1–2	394	198	L1
San Francisco 49ers	7	7	0	.500	3–3	4–6	273	337	W2
Atlanta Falcons	1	12	1	.077	0–6	1–9	175	422	L7

Note: Tie games were not officially counted in the standings until 1972.
