= 1968 San Francisco 49ers season =

American football team season

- Owner: Josephine Morabito; Jane Morabito
- General manager: Louis Spadia
- Head coach: Dick Nolan
- Offensive coordinator: Ed Hughes
- Home stadium: Kezar Stadium

Results
- Record: 7–6–1
- Division place: 3rd NFL Coastal
- Playoffs: Did not qualify

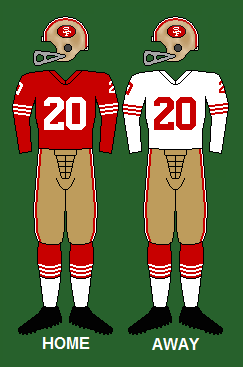
The uniform of the San Francisco 49ers, 1964-1969.

The 1968 San Francisco 49ers season was the franchise's 19th season in the National Football League, their 23rd overall, and the first with new head coach Dick Nolan.

The 49ers attempted to improve on their 7–7 record from the previous season. Ultimately, the 49ers consistently switched between winning record and losing record and ended their season with a 7–6–1 record, missing the playoffs for the 11th straight year.

== Offseason ==
=== NFL draft ===
1968 San Francisco 49ers draft
Round	Selection	Player	Position	College	Note
1	15	Forrest Blue	C	Auburn	
4	98	Johnny Fuller	DB	Lamar	

=== Undrafted free agents ===
1968 undrafted free agents of note
Player	Position	College
Rick Decker	Tackle	Wake Forest

== Personnel ==
=== Staff / Coaches ===
1968 San Francisco 49ers staff
Front office: Team Owner(s) - Josephine Morabito & Jane Morabito; General manager / Team President – Louis Spadia; Personnel Scout - Dick Gallagher; Head coaches: Head coach - Dick Nolan; Offensive coaches: Chief of Offense / Offensive Coordinator - Ed Hughes; Offensive Consultant – Y.A. Tittle; Offensive Backfied – Mike Holovak; Offensive Line / Blocking – Ernie Zwahlen	Defensive coaches: Defensive Coordinator / Defensive Line – Paul Wiggin; Linebackers – Mike Giddings; Defensive Backfield / Secondary – Jim Shofner; Special teams coaches: Joe Perry - Kicking Coach / Game Scout

=== Roster ===
1968 San Francisco 49ers roster
Quarterbacks (QB): 12 John Brodie; 10 George Mira; Running backs (RB): 42 Doug Cunningham; 33 Clem Daniels; 22 Gary Lewis; 45 Bill Tucker; 40 Ken Willard; Wide receivers (WR): 26 Kay McFarland; 85 Clifton McNeil; 88 Dick Witcher; Tight ends (TE): 44 John David Crow; 84 Dave Olerich; 89 Bob Windsor	Offensive linemen (OL): 79 Cas Banaszek T; 75 Forrest Blue C; 77 Bruce Bosley C; 66 Elmer Collett G; 68 Howard Mudd G; 69 Woody Peoples G; 76 Len Rohde T; Defensive linemen (DL): 72 Bill Belk DE; 86 Kevin Hardy DE/DT; 80 Stan Hindman DE; 70 Charlie Krueger DT; 60 Roland Lakes DT; 74 Clark Miller DE	Linebackers (LB): 50 Ed Beard MLB; 53 Tommy Hart OLB; 54 Harold Hays OLB; 55 Matt Hazeltine OLB; 57 Frank Nunley MLB; 64 Dave Wilcox OLB; Defensive backs (DB): 39 Kermit Alexander CB; 30 Johnny Fuller FS; 37 Jimmy Johnson CB; 32 Mel Phillips FS; 27 Al Randolph SS; 48 John Woitt CB; Special teams (ST): 36 Tommy Davis K; 11 Steve Spurrier P	Practice squad: 87 Tom Holzer DE; 81 Leo Johnson WR; 73 Lance Olssen T; 14 Dennis Patera K; 52 Skip Vanderbundt LB; Reserve: 63 Don Parker G (IR); -- George Rose CB (IR); Rookies in italics

== Preseason ==
Week	Date	Opponent	Result	Record	Venue
1	August 3	at San Diego Chargers (AFL)	L 18–30	0–1	San Diego Stadium
2	August 11	Dallas Cowboys	L 14–16	0–2	Kezar Stadium
3	August 18	Cleveland Browns	L 17–31	0–3	Kezar Stadium
4	August 23	at Denver Broncos (AFL)	W 22–6	1–3	University of Denver Stadium
5	September 1	Oakland Raiders (AFL)	L 19–26	1–4	Kezar Stadium
6	September 6	at Los Angeles Rams	L 20–21	1–5	Los Angeles Memorial Coliseum

== Regular season ==
=== Schedule ===
Week	Date	Opponent	Result	Record	Venue	Attendance
1	September 15	at **Baltimore Colts**	**L** 10–27	0–1	Memorial Stadium	56,864
2	September 22	St. Louis Cardinals	**W** 35–17	1–1	Kezar Stadium	27,557
3	September 29	**Atlanta Falcons**	**W** 28–13	2–1	Kezar Stadium	27,477
4	October 6	at **Los Angeles Rams**	**L** 10–24	2–2	Los Angeles Memorial Coliseum	69,520
5	October 13	**Baltimore Colts**	**L** 14–42	2–3	Kezar Stadium	32,822
6	October 20	at New York Giants	**W** 26–10	3–3	Yankee Stadium	62,958
7	October 27	at Detroit Lions	**W** 14–7	4–3	Tiger Stadium	53,555
8	November 3	Cleveland Browns	**L** 21–33	4–4	Kezar Stadium	31,359
9	November 10	at Chicago Bears	**L** 19–27	4–5	Wrigley Field	46,978
10	November 17	**Los Angeles Rams**	**T** 20–20	4–5–1	Kezar Stadium	41,815
11	November 24	at Pittsburgh Steelers	**W** 45–28	5–5–1	Pitt Stadium	21,408
12	December 1	Green Bay Packers	**W** 27–20	6–5–1	Kezar Stadium	47,218
13	December 8	Minnesota Vikings	**L** 20–30	6–6–1	Kezar Stadium	29,049
14	December 15	at **Atlanta Falcons**	**W** 14–12	7–6–1	Atlanta–Fulton County Stadium	44,977
Note: Intra-division opponents are in **bold** text.

== Standings ==
NFL Coastal
	W	L	T	PCT	DIV	CONF	PF	PA	STK
Baltimore Colts	13	1	0	.929	6–0	10–0	402	144	W8
Los Angeles Rams	10	3	1	.769	3–2–1	6–3–1	312	200	L2
San Francisco 49ers	7	6	1	.538	2–3–1	4–5–1	303	310	W1
Atlanta Falcons	2	12	0	.143	0–6	1–9	170	389	L4

Note: Tie games were not officially counted in the standings until 1972.
