= 1966 San Francisco 49ers season =

American football team season

- Owner: Josephine Morabito; Jane Morabito
- General manager: Louis Spadia
- Head coach: Jack Christiansen
- Home stadium: Kezar Stadium

Results
- Record: 6–6–2
- Division place: 4th NFL Western
- Playoffs: Did not qualify
- All-Pros: John Thomas
- Pro Bowlers: Bruce Bosley, Howard Mudd, Dave Parks, John Thomas, Dave Wilcox, Ken Willard

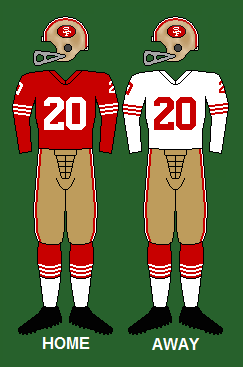
San Francisco 49ers uniform in 1966

The 1966 San Francisco 49ers season was the franchise's 17th season in the National Football League, their 21st overall, and their fourth under head coach Jack Christiansen.

The 49ers attempted to improve on their 7–6–1 record from the previous year and make the playoffs for the first time in 8 years. However, the 49ers faltered, starting their season 0–2–1. Despite winning their next 3 games, they split their next 8 games and tied 1 game to finish the season 6–6–2, and they missed the playoffs for the ninth straight year.

== Offseason ==
=== NFL draft ===
1966 San Francisco 49ers draft
| Round | Selection | Player | Position | College | Note |
|---|---|---|---|---|---|
| 1 | 11 | Stan Hindman | DE | Ole Miss | |
| 2 | 26 | Bob Windsor | TE | Kentucky | |
| 3 | 37 | Al Randolph | DB | Iowa | |
| 3 | 41 | Dan Bland | DB | Mississippi State | |
| 4 | 56 | Don Parker | G | Virginia | |
| 5 | 69 | Mel Phillips | DB | North Carolina A&T | |
| 5 | 71 | Steve Smith | T | Michigan | |
| 6 | 91 | Charlie Johnson | DT | Louisville | |
| 8 | 119 | Dick Witcher | WR | UCLA | |
| 9 | 133 | Kent Kramer | TE | Minnesota | |
| 10 | 147 | Ronald Sbranti | LB | Utah State | |
| 11 | 166 | Preston Ridlehuber | RB | Georgia | |
| 12 | 180 | Lyle Lobach | T | Simpson | |
| 13 | 194 | Jim Jackson | DB | Western Illinois | |
| 14 | 208 | Elmer Collett | G | San Francisco State | |
| 15 | 222 | Saint Saffold | SE | San Jose State | |
| 16 | 241 | Jim LeClair | QB | C.W. Post | |
| 17 | 255 | Jim Breeland | C | Georgia Tech | |
| 18 | 269 | Ron Parson | DE | Austin Peay State | |
| 19 | 283 | Dick Fitzgerald | T | Nebraska | |
| 20 | 297 | Willie Walker | DE | Baylor | |

== Personnel ==
=== Staff / Coaches ===
1966 San Francisco 49ers staff
| Front office: Team Owner(s) - Josephine Morabito & Jane Morabito; General manager – Louis Spadia; Personnel Scout - Dick Gallagher; Head coaches: Head coach - Jack Christiansen; Offensive coaches: Chief of Offense / Offensive Coordinator - Bill Johnson; Offensive Ends – Billy Wilson; Offensive Consultant – Y.A. Tittle | Defensive coaches: Defensive Assistant – Dick Voris; Defensive Backfield / Secondary – Jim David; Special teams coaches: None - N/A |

=== Roster ===
1966 San Francisco 49ers roster
| Quarterbacks (QB): 12 John Brodie; 17 Billy Kilmer P; 10 George Mira; Running backs (RB): 44 John David Crow; 29 Bob Daugherty; 43 David Kopay; 22 Gary Lewis; 40 Ken Willard; Wide receivers (WR): 30 Bernie Casey; 26 Kay McFarland; 81 Dave Parks; 88 Dick Witcher; Tight ends (TE): 89 Kent Kramer; 85 Monty Stickles | Offensive linemen (OL): 77 Bruce Bosley C; 56 Joe Cerne C; 73 Dave McCormick T; 68 Howard Mudd G; 67 Walt Rock T; 76 Len Rohde T; 78 John Thomas G; 63 Jim Wilson G; Defensive linemen (DL): 80 Stan Hindman DE; 72 Charlie Johnson DT; 70 Charlie Krueger DT; 60 Roland Lakes DT; 74 Clark Miller DE; 75 Jim Norton DE | Linebackers (LB): 50 Ed Beard MLB; 53 Mike Dowdle OLB/MLB; 54 Bob Harrison OLB; 55 Matt Hazeltine OLB; 64 Dave Wilcox OLB; Defensive backs (DB): 39 Kermit Alexander CB; 37 Jimmy Johnson CB; 45 Elbert Kimbrough SS; 32 Mel Phillips FS; 27 Al Randolph FS; 23 Wayne Swinford CB/S; Special teams (ST): 36 Tommy Davis K/P | Practice squad: -- Dave Hettema T; 38 Jim Jackson RB; -- Jim LeClair QB; -- Steve Smith T; Reserve: 58 Jack Chapple LB (IR); 86 Dan Colchico DE (IR); 20 George Donnelly S (IR); Rookies in italics |

== Preseason ==
| Week | Date | Opponent | Result | Record | Venue |
|---|---|---|---|---|---|
| 1 | August 7 | Dallas Cowboys | L 13–24 | 0–1 | Kezar Stadium |
| 2 | August 14 | Cleveland Browns | L 17–28 | 0–2 | Kezar Stadium |
| 3 | August 20 | vs. Pittsburgh Steelers | L 17–34 | 0–3 | Multnomah Stadium |
| 4 | August 27 | vs. Atlanta Falcons | L 17–24 | 0–4 | Williams–Brice Stadium |
| 5 | September 3 | at Los Angeles Rams | L 9–29 | 0–5 | Los Angeles Memorial Coliseum |

== Regular season ==
=== Schedule ===
| Week | Date | Opponent | Result | Record | Venue | Attendance |
|---|---|---|---|---|---|---|
| 1 | September 11 | Minnesota Vikings | **T** 20–20 | 0–0–1 | Kezar Stadium | 29,312 |
| 2 | Bye | | | | | |
| 3 | September 25 | at Baltimore Colts | **L** 14–36 | 0–1–1 | Memorial Stadium | 56,715 |
| 4 | September 30 | at **Los Angeles Rams** | **L** 3–34 | 0–2–1 | Los Angeles Memorial Coliseum | 45,642 |
| 5 | October 9 | Green Bay Packers | **W** 21–20 | 1–2–1 | Kezar Stadium | 39,290 |
| 6 | October 16 | at Atlanta Falcons | **W** 44–7 | 2–2–1 | Atlanta Stadium | 54,788 |
| 7 | October 23 | Detroit Lions | **W** 27–24 | 3–2–1 | Kezar Stadium | 36,745 |
| 8 | October 30 | at Minnesota Vikings | **L** 3–28 | 3–3–1 | Metropolitan Stadium | 45,007 |
| 9 | November 6 | Los Angeles Rams | **W** 21–13 | 4–3–1 | Kezar Stadium | 35,372 |
| 10 | November 13 | at Chicago Bears | **T** 30–30 | 4–3–2 | Wrigley Field | 47,079 |
| 11 | November 20 | Philadelphia Eagles | **L** 34–35 | 4–4–2 | Kezar Stadium | 31,993 |
| 12 | November 24 | at Detroit Lions | **W** 41–14 | 5–4–2 | Tiger Stadium | 53,189 |
| 13 | December 4 | at Green Bay Packers | **L** 7–20 | 5–5–2 | Milwaukee County Stadium | 48,725 |
| 14 | December 11 | Chicago Bears | **W** 41–14 | 6–5–2 | Kezar Stadium | 37,170 |
| 15 | December 18 | Baltimore Colts | **L** 14–30 | 6–6–2 | Kezar Stadium | 40,005 |
Note: Intra-conference opponents are in **bold** text.

=== Game summaries ===
==== Week 1: vs Minnesota Vikings ====
| Team | 1 | 2 | 3 | 4 | Total |
|---|---|---|---|---|---|
| Vikings | 0 | 7 | 10 | 3 | 20 |
| 49ers | 6 | 14 | 0 | 0 | 20 |

- Date: September 11
- Location: Kezar Stadium, San Francisco, CA
- Game weather: 60 °F (16 °C); wind 25 mph

Scoring summary
| Q1 | SF | Davis 44 yard field goal | SF 3–0 |
| Q1 | SF | Davis 46 yard field goal | SF 6–0 |
| Q2 | SF | Stickles 9 yard pass from Brodie (Davis kick) | SF 13–0 |
| Q2 | MIN | Mason 2 yard run (Cox kick) | SF 13–7 |
| Q2 | SF | Parks 5 yard pass from Brodie (Davis kick) | SF 20–7 |
| Q3 | MIN | Brown 33 yard run (Cox kick) | SF 20–14 |
| Q3 | MIN | Cox 26 yard field goal | SF 20–17 |
| Q4 | MIN | Cox 31 yard field goal | Tie 20–20 |

==== Week 3: at Baltimore Colts ====
Week Three: San Francisco 49ers (0–0–1) at Baltimore Colts (1–1)

| Quarter | 1 | 2 | 3 | 4 | Total |
|---|---|---|---|---|---|
| 49ers | 7 | 0 | 0 | 7 | **14** |
| Colts | 6 | 10 | 6 | 14 | **36** |

at Memorial Stadium, Baltimore, Maryland

- Date: September 25
- Game weather: 56 °F (13 °C)
- Recap

Game information

**First quarter**

- BAL – Lou Michaels 41-yard field goal. Colts 3–0.
- SF – Bernie Casey 20-yard pass from John Brodie (Tommy Davis) kick. 49ers 7-3.
- BAL – Lou Michaels 37-yard field goal. 49ers 7-6

**Second quarter**

- BAL – Lou Michaels 25-yard field goal. Colts 9-7.
- BAL – John Mackey 57-yard pass from Johnny Unitas (Lou Michaels kick). Colts 16-7

**Third quarter**

- BAL – Lou Michaels 23-yard field goal. Colts 19–7.
- BAL – Lou Michaels 30-yard field goal. Colts 22-7.

**Fourth quarter**

- BAL – Lenny Moore 1-yard run (Lou Michaels kick). Colts 29–7.
- BAL – Butch Wilson 7-yard pass from Johnny Unitas (Lou Michaels kick). Colts 36–7.
- SF – Kent Kramer 17-yard pass from George Mira (Tommy Davis kick). Colts 36–14.

**Top passers**

- 49ers – John Brodie – 16/25, 159 yards, TD, INT
- Colts – Johnny Unitas – 14/30, 225 yards, 2 TD, INT

**Top rushers**

- 49ers – Ken Willard – 10 rushes, 33 yards
- Colts – Tony Lorick – 18 rushes, 110 yards

**Top receivers**

- 49ers – Dave Parks – 4 receptions, 52 yards
- Colts – John Mackey – 3 receptions, 76 yards, TD

== Standings ==
NFL Western Conference
| | W | L | T | PCT | CONF | PF | PA | STK |
|---|---|---|---|---|---|---|---|---|
| Green Bay Packers | 12 | 2 | 0 | .857 | 10–2 | 335 | 163 | W5 |
| Baltimore Colts | 9 | 5 | 0 | .643 | 7–5 | 314 | 226 | W1 |
| Los Angeles Rams | 8 | 6 | 0 | .571 | 6–6 | 289 | 212 | L1 |
| San Francisco 49ers | 6 | 6 | 2 | .500 | 5–5–2 | 320 | 325 | L1 |
| Chicago Bears | 5 | 7 | 2 | .417 | 4–6–2 | 234 | 272 | W1 |
| Detroit Lions | 4 | 9 | 1 | .308 | 3–8–1 | 206 | 317 | L3 |
| Minnesota Vikings | 4 | 9 | 1 | .308 | 4–7–1 | 292 | 304 | L1 |

Note: Tie games were not officially counted in the standings until 1972.

== Statistics ==
=== Team leaders ===
| Category | Player(s) | Value | Rank |
|---|---|---|---|
| Passing yards | John Brodie | 2,810 | 3rd |
| Passing touchdowns | John Brodie | 16 | 6th |
| Rushing yards | Ken Willard | 763 | 5th |
| Rushing touchdowns | Ken Williard | 5 | 13th |
| Receiving yards | Dave Parks | 974 | 5th |
| Receiving touchdowns | Dave Parks | 5 | 17th |
| Points | Tommy Davis | 86 | 12th |
| Kickoff return yards | Kermit Alexander | 984 | 2nd |
| Punt return yards | Kermit Alexander | 198 | 4th |
| Interceptions | Kermit Alexander/Jimmy Johnson | 4 | t6th |
| Sacks | Clark Miller | 10 | 11th |

Note that sack totals from 1960 to 1981 are considered unofficial by the NFL.

=== League rankings ===
| Category | Total yards | Yards per game | NFL rank (out of 15) |
|---|---|---|---|
| Passing offense | 2,992 | 213.7 | 3rd |
| Rushing offense | 1,790 | 127.9 | 6th |
| Total offense | 4,782 | 341.5 | 3rd |
| Passing defense | 2,250 | 160.7 | 11th |
| Rushing defense | 1,629 | 116.4 | 5th |
| Total defense | 4,179 | 298.5 | 8th |
