= 1973 San Francisco 49ers season =

American football team season

- Owner: Josephine Morabito; Jane Morabito
- General manager: Louis Spadia
- Head coach: Dick Nolan
- Home stadium: Candlestick Park

Results
- Record: 5–9
- Division place: 3rd NFC West
- Playoffs: Did not qualify
- Pro Bowlers: C Forrest Blue; G Woody Peoples; TE Ted Kwalick; OLB Dave Wilcox; P Tom Wittum

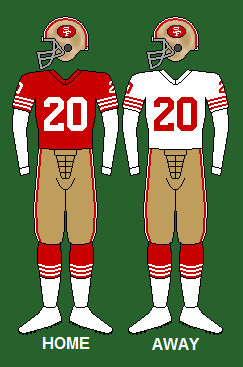
The uniform of the San Francisco 49ers, 1970-1975.

The 1973 San Francisco 49ers season was the franchise's 24th season in the National Football League and their 28th overall. They began the season hoping to improve on their previous years' output of 8–5–1, and looking to make the playoffs for the fourth consecutive season. However, the team finished 5–9 and failed to qualify for the playoffs for the first time in four years. After the season, quarterback John Brodie retired after 17 years in the NFL, all with the 49ers.

== Offseason ==
=== NFL draft ===
1973 San Francisco 49ers draft
Round	Pick	Player	Position	College	Notes
1	18	Mike Holmes	Wide receiver	Texas Southern	played with the 49ers beginning in 1974
2	41	Willie Harper	Linebacker	Nebraska	
5	112	Mike Fulk	Linebacker	Indiana	
5	122	Ed Beverly	Wide receiver	Arizona State	
6	149	Arthur Moore	Nose tackle	Tulsa	
7	174	John Mitchell	Linebacker	Alabama	
8	201	Dave Atkins	Running back	UTEP	
9	226	Roger Praetorius	Running back	Syracuse	
10	253	Charlie Hunt	Linebacker	Florida State	
11	278	Tom Dahlberg	Running back	Gustavus Adolphus	
12	305	Larry Pettus	Tackle	Tennessee State	
13	330	Alan Kelso	Center	Washington	
14	357	Dennis Morrison	Quarterback	Kansas State	played with the 49ers in 1974
15	382	Mike Bettiga	Wide receiver	Humboldt State	played with the 49ers in 1974
16	409	Mike Oven	Tight end	Georgia Tech	
17	434	Bob Erickson	Guard	North Dakota State	
Made roster

== Personnel ==
=== Staff / Coaches ===
1973 San Francisco 49ers staff
Front office: Team Owner(s) - Josephine Morabito & Jane Morabito; General manager / Team President – Louis Spadia; Personnel Scout - Dick Gallagher; Head coaches: Head coach - Dick Nolan; Offensive coaches: Offensive Coordinator - Jim Shofner; Quarterbacks / Wide Receivers – Jim Shofner; Offensive Backs – Doug Scovil; Offensive Line / Blocking – Dick Stanfel	Defensive coaches: Defensive Coordinator / Defensive Line – Paul Wiggin; Linebackers – Ed Beard; Defensive Backfield / Secondary – Don Heinrich; Special teams coaches: Special Teams – Ed Beard & Chet Franklin

=== Roster ===
1973 San Francisco 49ers roster
Quarterbacks (QB): 12 John Brodie; 10 Dennis Morrison; 19 Joe Reed; 11 Steve Spurrier; Running backs (RB): 29 Dave Atkins; 42 Doug Cunningham; 33 Randy Jackson; 24 Jimmy Thomas; 22 Vic Washington; 40 Ken Willard; Wide receivers (WR): 46 Danny Abramowicz; 80 Mike Bettiga; 81 Ed Beverly; 17 John Isenbarger; 18 Gene Washington; Tight ends (TE): 82 Ted Kwalick; 88 Dick Witcher	Offensive linemen (OL): 79 Cas Banaszek T; 77 Jean Barrett T; 65 Randy Beisler G; 75 Forrest Blue C; 63 Ed Hardy G; 69 Woody Peoples G; 76 Len Rohde T; 67 John Watson G; Defensive linemen (DL): 72 Bill Belk DE; 86 Cedrick Hardman DE; 53 Tommy Hart DE; 74 Stan Hindman DT; 56 Bob Hoskins DT; 70 Charlie Krueger DT; 78 Rolf Krueger DT	Linebackers (LB): 59 Willie Harper OLB; 61 Charlie Hunt OLB; 57 Frank Nunley MLB; 84 Dave Olerich OLB; 58 Jim Sniadecki MLB; 52 Skip Vanderbundt OLB; 64 Dave Wilcox OLB; Defensive backs (DB): 43 Windlan Hall FS; 37 Jimmy Johnson CB; 49 Ralph McGill CB/S; 32 Mel Phillips SS; 38 Mike Simpson FS; 44 Bruce Taylor CB; Special teams (ST): 30 Bruce Gossett K; 13 Tom Wittum P	Reserve: 83 Terry Beasley WR (IR); 55 Mike Fulk LB (IR); 20 Mike Holmes CB/S (IR); 35 Larry Schreiber RB (IR); Rookies in italics 47 active, 4 reserve, 0 practice squad

== Preseason ==
Week	Date	Opponent	Result	Record	Venue	Attendance
1	July 28	vs. New England Patriots	W 20–7	1–0	Fawcett Stadium	19,685
2	August 6	at Cleveland Browns	W 27–16	2–0	Cleveland Municipal Stadium	65,707
3	August 11	vs. New York Jets	L 14–34	2–1	Tampa Stadium	46,477
4	August 19	San Diego Chargers	W 19–7	3–1	Candlestick Park	54,977
5	August 26	Denver Broncos	W 43–7	4–1	Candlestick Park	59,097
6	September 1	at Oakland Raiders	L 17–23	4–2	Oakland–Alameda County Coliseum	53,612
7	September 7	at Los Angeles Rams	L 10–38	4–3	Los Angeles Memorial Coliseum	57,687

== Schedule ==
Week	Date	Opponent	Result	Record	Venue	Attendance
1	September 16	at Miami Dolphins	**L** 13–21	0–1	Miami Orange Bowl	68,275
2	September 23	at Denver Broncos	**W** 36–34	1–1	Mile High Stadium	50,966
3	September 30	**Los Angeles Rams**	**L** 20–40	1–2	Candlestick Park	57,487
4	October 7	at **Atlanta Falcons**	**W** 13–9	2–2	Atlanta–Fulton County Stadium	51,107
5	October 14	Minnesota Vikings	**L** 13–17	2–3	Candlestick Park	56,438
6	October 21	**New Orleans Saints**	**W** 40–0	3–3	Candlestick Park	52,881
7	October 28	**Atlanta Falcons**	**L** 3–17	3–4	Candlestick Park	56,825
8	November 4	at Detroit Lions	**L** 20–30	3–5	Tiger Stadium	49,531
9	November 11	at Washington Redskins	**L** 9–33	3–6	RFK Stadium	54,381
10	November 18	at **Los Angeles Rams**	**L** 13–31	3–7	Los Angeles Memorial Coliseum	78,358
11	November 26	Green Bay Packers	**W** 20–6	4–7	Candlestick Park	49,244
12	December 2	Philadelphia Eagles	**W** 38–28	5–7	Candlestick Park	51,155
13	December 9	at **New Orleans Saints**	**L** 10–16	5–8	Tulane Stadium	62,490
14	December 15	Pittsburgh Steelers	**L** 14–37	5–9	Candlestick Park	52,252
Note: Intra-division opponents are in **bold** text.

=== Game summaries ===
==== Week 2: at Denver Broncos ====
Team	1	2	3	4	Total
• 49ers	0	20	10	6	36
Broncos	10	3	7	14	34

- Date: September 23
- Location: Mile High Stadium, Denver, Colorado
- Game start: 2:00 p.m.
- Game weather: 66 °F (18.9 °C), wind 16 miles per hour (26 km/h; 14 kn)

Scoring summary
1	DEN	Jerry Simmons 18 yard pass from Charley Johnson (Jim Turner kick)	Broncos 7–0
1	DEN	Jim Turner 34 yard field goal	Broncos 10–0
2	DEN	Jim Turner 28 yard field goal	Broncos 13–0
2	SF	Bruce Gossett 22 yard field goal	Broncos 13–3
2	SF	Jimmy Thomas 5 yard run (Bruce Gossett kick)	Broncos 13–10
2	SF	John Brodie 1 yard run (Bruce Gossett kick)	49ers 17–13
2	SF	Bruce Gossett 39 yard field goal	49ers 20–13
3	SF	Bruce Gossett 14 yard field goal	49ers 23–13
3	SF	Vic Washington 1 yard run (Bruce Gossett kick)	49ers 30–13
3	DEN	Floyd Little 1 yard run (Jim Turner kick)	49ers 30–20
4	SF	Bruce Gossett 46 yard field goal	49ers 33–20
4	DEN	Gene Washington 19 yard pass from Charley Johnson (Jim Turner kick)	49ers 33–27
4	DEN	Floyd Little 1 yard run (Jim Turner kick)	Broncos 34–33
4	SF	Bruce Gossett 39 yard field goal	49ers 36–34

=== Standings ===
NFC West
	W	L	T	PCT	DIV	CONF	PF	PA	STK
Los Angeles Rams	12	2	0	.857	5–1	9–2	388	178	W6
Atlanta Falcons	9	5	0	.643	4–2	7–4	318	224	W1
San Francisco 49ers	5	9	0	.357	2–4	4–7	262	319	L2
New Orleans Saints	5	9	0	.357	1–5	4–7	163	312	L1
