= 1970 San Francisco 49ers season =

American football team season

- Owner: Josephine Morabito; Jane Morabito
- General manager: Louis Spadia
- Head coach: Dick Nolan
- Offensive coordinator: Ed Hughes
- Home stadium: Kezar Stadium

Results
- Record: 10–3–1
- Division place: 1st NFC West
- Playoffs: Won Divisional Playoffs (at Vikings) 17–14; Lost NFC Championship (vs. Cowboys) 10–17
- Pro Bowlers: T Len Rohde; QB John Brodie; WR Gene Washington; OLB Dave Wilcox; CB Jimmy Johnson

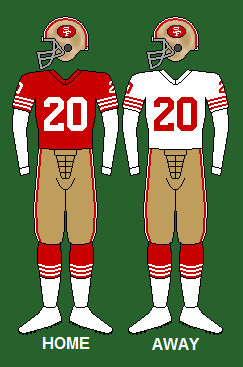
The uniform of the San Francisco 49ers, 1970-1975

The 1970 San Francisco 49ers season was the franchise's 21st season in the National Football League (NFL), and its 25th overall. Quarterback John Brodie won the NFL MVP award, and the 49ers captured their first division title with a 10–3–1 record. It was the first time they had tallied double-digit wins as an NFL team. Cornerback Bruce Taylor won Defensive Rookie of the Year honors. In the NFC Championship, the 49ers lost to the Dallas Cowboys in their final game at Kezar Stadium.

== Offseason ==
=== NFL draft ===
1970 San Francisco 49ers draft
Round	Pick	Player	Position	College	Notes
1	9	Cedrick Hardman *	Defensive end	North Texas	
1	17	Bruce Taylor *	Defensive back	Boston University	
2	48	John Isenbarger	Running back	Indiana	
4	87	Vic Washington *	Running back	Wyoming	started play with 49ers in 1971
5	113	Gary McArthur	Tackle	USC	
6	138	Rusty Clark	Quarterback	Houston	signed with Edmonton Eskimos (CFL)
7	165	Jim Strong	Running back	Houston	
8	191	Carter Campbell	Defensive end	Weber State	
9	217	Preston Riley	Wide receiver	Memphis State	
10	243	Larry Schreiber	Running back	Tennessee Tech	started play with 49ers in 1971
11	269	Dan Crockett	Wide receiver	Toledo	
12	295	Bill Tant	Tackle	Dayton	
13	321	Jim Vanderslice	Linebacker	TCU	
14	347	Jack King	Guard	Clemson	
15	373	Dave Delsignore	Wide receiver	Youngstown State	
16	399	Produs Perkins	Defensive back	Livingstone	
17	425	Mike Culton	Punter	La Verne	
Made roster * Made at least one Pro Bowl during career

== Personnel ==
=== Staff / Coaches ===
1970 San Francisco 49ers staff
Front office: Team Owner(s) - Josephine Morabito & Jane Morabito; General manager / Team President – Louis Spadia; Personnel Scout - Dick Gallagher; Head coaches: Head coach - Dick Nolan; Offensive coaches: Chief of Offense / Offensive Coordinator - Ed Hughes; Offensive Consultant – Y.A. Tittle; Offensive Backfied – Mike Holovak; Offensive Line / Blocking – Ernie Zwahlen	Defensive coaches: Defensive Coordinator / Defensive Line – Paul Wiggin; Linebackers – Mike Giddings; Defensive Backfield / Secondary – Jim Shofner; Special teams coaches: Joe Perry - Kicking Coach / Game Scout

=== Roster ===
1970 San Francisco 49ers roster
Quarterbacks (QB): 12 John Brodie; 11 Steve Spurrier P; Running backs (RB): 17 John Isenbarger; 28 Jim Strong; 24 Jimmy Thomas; 45 Bill Tucker; 40 Ken Willard; Wide receivers (WR): 85 Preston Riley; 18 Gene Washington; 88 Dick Witcher; Tight ends (TE): 82 Ted Kwalick; 89 Bob Windsor	Offensive linemen (OL): 79 Cas Banaszek T; 65 Randy Beisler G; 75 Forrest Blue C; 66 Elmer Collett G; 56 Bob Hoskins G; 69 Woody Peoples G; 76 Len Rohde T; Defensive linemen (DL): 72 Bill Belk DE; 74 Earl Edwards DT; 86 Cedrick Hardman DE; 53 Tommy Hart DE; 80 Stan Hindman DE; 70 Charlie Krueger DT; 60 Roland Lakes DT; 78 Sam Silas DT/DE	Linebackers (LB): 50 Ed Beard MLB; 51 Carter Campbell OLB; 57 Frank Nunley MLB; 58 Jim Sniadecki OLB; 64 Dave Wilcox OLB; Defensive backs (DB): 23 Johnny Fuller CB/S; 37 Jimmy Johnson CB; 32 Mel Phillips SS; 27 Al Randolph SS; 38 Mike Simpson CB; 44 Bruce Taylor CB; 25 Roosevelt Taylor FS; Special teams (ST): 30 Bruce Gossett K	Practice squad: 42 Doug Cunningham RB; 81 Lee Johnson WR; 35 Larry Schreiber RB; 52 Skip Vanderbundt LB; Reserve: None - Vacant; Rookies in italics 40 active, 0 reserve, 4 practice squad

== Preseason ==
=== Schedule ===
Week	Date	Opponent	Result	Record	Venue	Attendance	Sources
1	August 15	Cleveland Browns	L 14–17	0–1	Tampa Stadium	41,851	Recap
2	August 22	at Miami Dolphins	L 7–17	0–2	Miami Orange Bowl	52,812	Recap
3	August 29	Denver Broncos	W 23–7	1–2	Autzen Stadium	26,238	Recap
4	September 6	Oakland Raiders	L 17–31	1–3	Kezar Stadium	55,521	Recap
5	September 12	at Los Angeles Rams	L 14–17	1–4	Los Angeles Memorial Coliseum	55,430	Recap

== Regular season ==
=== Schedule ===
Week	Date	Opponent	Result	Record	Venue	Attendance	Recap
1	September 20	Washington Redskins	**W** 26–17	1–0	Kezar Stadium	34,984	Recap
2	September 27	Cleveland Browns	**W** 34–31	2–0	Kezar Stadium	37,502	Recap
3	October 4	at **Atlanta Falcons**	**L** 20–21	2–1	Atlanta Stadium	58,850	Recap
4	October 11	at **Los Angeles Rams**	**W** 20–6	3–1	Los Angeles Memorial Coliseum	77,272	Recap
5	October 18	**New Orleans Saints**	**T** 20–20	3–1–1	Kezar Stadium	39,446	Recap
6	October 25	Denver Broncos	**W** 19–14	4–1–1	Kezar Stadium	39,515	Recap
7	November 1	Green Bay Packers	**W** 26–10	5–1–1	Kezar Stadium	59,335	Recap
8	November 8	at Chicago Bears	**W** 37–16	6–1–1	Wrigley Field	45,607	Recap
9	November 15	at Houston Oilers	**W** 30–20	7–1–1	Astrodome	43,040	Recap
10	November 22	at Detroit Lions	**L** 7–28	7–2–1	Tiger Stadium	56,232	Recap
11	November 29	**Los Angeles Rams**	**L** 13–30	7–3–1	Kezar Stadium	59,602	Recap
12	December 6	**Atlanta Falcons**	**W** 24–20	8–3–1	Kezar Stadium	41,387	Recap
13	December 13	at **New Orleans Saints**	**W** 38–27	9–3–1	Tulane Stadium	61,940	Recap
14	December 20	at Oakland Raiders	**W** 38–7	10–3–1	Oakland Coliseum	54,535	Recap
Note: Intra-division opponents are in **bold** text.

=== Standings ===
NFC West
	W	L	T	PCT	DIV	CONF	PF	PA	STK
San Francisco 49ers	10	3	1	.769	3–2–1	6–3–1	352	267	W3
Los Angeles Rams	9	4	1	.692	4–1–1	7–3–1	325	202	W1
Atlanta Falcons	4	8	2	.333	3–2–1	3–6–2	206	261	L1
New Orleans Saints	2	11	1	.154	0–5–1	2–8–1	172	347	L6

Note: Tie games were not officially counted in the standings until 1972.

== Postseason ==
=== Schedule ===
Round	Date	Opponent	Result	Record	Venue	Recap
Divisional	December 27	at Minnesota Vikings	W 17–14	1–0	Metropolitan Stadium	Recap
NFC Championship	January 3, 1971	Dallas Cowboys	L 10–17	1–1	Kezar Stadium	Recap
