= 1972 San Francisco 49ers season =

American football team season

- Owner: Josephine Morabito; Jane Morabito
- General manager: Louis Spadia
- Head coach: Dick Nolan
- Home stadium: Candlestick Park

Results
- Record: 8–5–1
- Division place: 1st NFC West
- Playoffs: Lost Divisional Playoffs (vs. Cowboys) 28–30
- Pro Bowlers: C Forrest Blue; G Woody Peoples; WR Gene Washington; TE Ted Kwalick; OLB Dave Wilcox; CB Jimmy Johnson

The 1972 San Francisco 49ers season was the franchise's 23rd season in the National Football League and their 27th overall. The 49ers appeared in the playoffs for the third consecutive year.

After an ankle injury to quarterback John Brodie in a loss to the Giants to fall to 2–3, Steve Spurrier stepped in and turned things around with brilliant performances to get the 49ers back in the playoff picture by going 5–2–1 in the next eight games. In the regular season finale, Brodie returned late in the third quarter and threw two touchdown passes in the fourth to rally the 49ers to a 20–17 victory over the Minnesota Vikings for an 8–5–1 record and third straight division title.

In the divisional playoffs at Candlestick Park, the 49ers looked poised for a return to the NFC Championship game, leading the Dallas Cowboys 28–13 at the start of the fourth quarter, but the Cowboys scored seventeen unanswered points to win by two.

This was the third consecutive season that San Francisco lost to Dallas in the playoffs, and the 49ers' last postseason appearance for nine years.

== Offseason ==
=== NFL draft ===
1972 San Francisco 49ers draft
Round	Pick	Player	Position	College	Notes
1	19	Terry Beasley	Wide receiver	Auburn	
2	28	Ralph McGill	Defensive back	Tulsa	
2	44	Jean Barrett	Tackle	Tulsa	started playing for the 49ers in 1973
3	71	Jubilee Dunbar	Wide receiver	Southern	
4	96	Windlan Hall	Defensive back	Arizona State	
5	123	Mike Greene	Linebacker	Georgia	
6	148	Jackie Walker	Defensive back	Tennessee	
7	175	Ed Hardy	Guard	Jackson State	started playing for the 49ers in 1973
8	200	Tom Wittum *	Punter	Northern Illinois	started playing for the 49ers in 1973
9	227	Jerry Brown	Defensive back	Northwestern	
10	252	Steve Williams	Defensive end	Western Carolina	
11	279	Tom Laputka	Defensive end	Southern Illinois	
12	304	Steve Setzler	Defensive end	Saint John's (MN)	
13	331	Leon Pettigrew	Tackle	Cal State Northridge	
14	356	Eric Guthrie	Quarterback	Boise State	
15	383	Bob Maddox	Defensive end	Frostburg State	was ineligible to be drafted.
16	408	Ron Davis	Guard	Virginia State	
17	435	Ted Alexander	Running back	Langston	
Made roster * Made at least one Pro Bowl during career

== Personnel ==
=== Staff / Coaches ===
1972 San Francisco 49ers staff
Front office: Team Owner(s) - Josephine Morabito & Jane Morabito; General manager / Team President – Louis Spadia; Personnel Scout - Dick Gallagher; Head coaches: Head coach - Dick Nolan; Offensive coaches: Offensive Coordinator - Jim Shofner; Quarterbacks / Wide Receivers – Jim Shofner; Offensive Backs – Doug Scovil; Offensive Line / Blocking – Dick Stanfel	Defensive coaches: Defensive Coordinator / Defensive Line – Paul Wiggin; Linebackers – Mike Giddings; Defensive Backfield / Secondary – Don Heinrich; Special teams coaches: Chet Franklin

=== Roster ===
1972 San Francisco 49ers roster
Quarterbacks (QB): 12 John Brodie; 19 Joe Reed; 11 Steve Spurrier; Running backs (RB): 35 Larry Schreiber; 24 Jimmy Thomas; 22 Vic Washington; 40 Ken Willard; Wide receivers (WR): 83 Terry Beasley; 17 John Isenbarger; 85 Preston Riley; 18 Gene Washington; 88 Dick Witcher; Tight ends (TE): 82 Ted Kwalick	Offensive linemen (OL): 79 Cas Banaszek T; 65 Randy Beisler G; 75 Forrest Blue C; 66 Elmer Collett G; 69 Woody Peoples G; 76 Len Rohde T; 67 John Watson T; Defensive linemen (DL): 72 Bill Belk DE; 74 Earl Edwards DT; 86 Cedrick Hardman DE; 53 Tommy Hart DE; 56 Bob Hoskins DT; 70 Charlie Krueger DT	Linebackers (LB): 50 Ed Beard MLB; 57 Frank Nunley MLB; 84 Dave Olerich OLB; 52 Skip Vanderbundt OLB; 64 Dave Wilcox OLB; Defensive backs (DB): 23 Johnny Fuller FS; 43 Windlan Hall SS; 37 Jimmy Johnson CB; 49 Ralph McGill CB; 32 Mel Phillips SS; 38 Mike Simpson FS; 44 Bruce Taylor CB; Special teams (ST): 30 Bruce Gossett K; 15 Jim McCann P	Practice squad: 77 Jean Barrett T; 42 Doug Cunningham RB; 87 Jubilee Dunbar WR; 63 Ed Hardy G; 54 Marty Huff LB; 78 Rolf Krueger DE/DT; 13 Tom Wittum P; Reserve: 58 Jim Sniadecki LB (IR); Rookies in italics 40 active, 1 reserve, 7 practice squad

== Preseason ==
Week	Date	Opponent	Result	Record	Venue	Attendance
1	August 5	vs. New York Jets	L 10–17	0–1	Gator Bowl	41,920
2	August 13	Cleveland Browns	W 20–13	1–1	Candlestick Park	58,364
3	August 19	at San Diego Chargers	L 16–17	1–2	San Diego Stadium	47,308
4	August 27	Denver Broncos	L 24–27	1–3	Candlestick Park	58,115
5	September 3	Oakland Raiders	W 34–21	2–3	Candlestick Park	61,237
6	September 8	at Los Angeles Rams	W 17–14	3–3	Los Angeles Memorial Coliseum	60,807

== Regular season ==
=== Schedule ===
Week	Date	Opponent	Result	Record	Venue	Attendance
1	September 17	San Diego Chargers	**W** 34–3	1–0	Candlestick Park	59,438
2	September 24	at Buffalo Bills	**L** 20–27	1–1	War Memorial Stadium	45,845
3	October 1	at **New Orleans Saints**	**W** 37–2	2–1	Tulane Stadium	69,840
4	October 8	at **Los Angeles Rams**	**L** 7–31	2–2	Los Angeles Memorial Coliseum	77,382
5	October 15	New York Giants	**L** 17–23	2–3	Candlestick Park	58,606
6	October 22	**New Orleans Saints**	**T** 20–20	2–3–1	Candlestick Park	59,167
7	October 29	at **Atlanta Falcons**	**W** 49–14	3–3–1	Atlanta Stadium	58,850
8	November 5	at Green Bay Packers	**L** 24–34	3–4–1	Milwaukee County Stadium	47,897
9	November 12	Baltimore Colts	**W** 24–21	4–4–1	Candlestick Park	61,214
10	November 19	at Chicago Bears	**W** 34–21	5–4–1	Soldier Field	55,701
11	November 23	at Dallas Cowboys	**W** 31–10	6–4–1	Texas Stadium	65,124
12	December 4	**Los Angeles Rams**	**L** 16–26	6–5–1	Candlestick Park	61,214
13	December 10	**Atlanta Falcons**	**W** 20–0	7–5–1	Candlestick Park	61,214
14	December 16	Minnesota Vikings	**W** 20–17	8–5–1	Candlestick Park	61,214
Note: Intra-division opponents are in **bold** text.

=== Standings ===
NFC West
	W	L	T	PCT	DIV	CONF	PF	PA	STK
San Francisco 49ers	8	5	1	.607	3–2–1	6–4–1	353	249	W2
Atlanta Falcons	7	7	0	.500	3–3	5–5	269	274	L2
Los Angeles Rams	6	7	1	.464	4–2	5–5–1	291	286	L2
New Orleans Saints	2	11	1	.179	1–4–1	2–8–1	215	361	L3

== Postseason ==
=== Schedule ===
Round	Date	Opponent	Result	Record	Venue	Attendance
Divisional	December 23	Dallas Cowboys	L 28–30	0–1	Candlestick Park	61,214
