= Dick Witcher =

American football player (1944–2021)

No. 88
- Positions: Wide receiver, Tight end

Personal information
- Born: October 10, 1944; Salinas, California, U.S.
- Died: February 22, 2021 (aged 76); Rancho Cordova, California, U.S.
- Listed height: 6 ft 3 in (1.91 m)
- Listed weight: 204 lb (93 kg)

Career information
- High school: Shafter (Shafter, California)
- College: UCLA
- NFL draft: 1966: 8th round, 119th overall pick

Career history
- San Francisco 49ers (1966–1973); Southern California Sun (1974)

Career NFL statistics
- Receptions: 172
- Receiving yards: 2,359
- Receiving touchdowns: 14
- Stats at Pro Football Reference

Dick Vernon Witcher (October 10, 1944 – February 22, 2021) was an American professional football player who was a wide receiver in the National Football League (NFL). Witcher was drafted by the San Francisco 49ers in the eighth round (119th overall) of the 1966 NFL draft. At 6 ft 3 in (1.91 m), Witcher first played two years at Bakersfield College, then graduated from UCLA. Witcher played in eight NFL seasons from 1966 to 1973 for the 49ers.

Witcher was a backup to Dave Parks and Bernie Casey during his rookie season. After Casey was traded to the Los Angeles Rams in 1967, Witcher moved into the starting lineup and led the 49ers with 46 receptions. Witcher followed up with 39 receptions in 1968. Witcher started 1969 as a backup to Gene Washington and Clifton McNeil, but by the 6th game he moved back into the starting lineup ahead of McNeil. He ended up with 33 receptions in 1969.

Against Cleveland in 1970, Witcher suffered his most serious injury of his career, a separated shoulder. He missed 3 games, the only games missed in his 49er career. With John Brodie having an MVP season and the 49ers with a solid defense, the team won its division with a 10–3–1 record, qualifying for the playoffs. At Minnesota, Witcher caught a 24-yard TD in the 17–14 upset win over the Vikings. Witcher scored the 49ers lone TD the following week against the Dallas Cowboys in the NFC Championship Game at Kezar Stadium.

After an 18 reception season in 1971, the 49ers looked to upgrade the wide receiver position opposite Gene Washington. Terry Beasley from Auburn was the 49ers 1st draft pick in the 1972 NFL draft. However, Witcher opened the season as the 49ers starting receiver. By now, he was also the 49ers backup tight end, replacing the traded Bob Windsor. After 6 games, Witcher had only 2 receptions and was replaced with Preston Riley. In the final game of the season against Minnesota, the 49ers needed a win to qualify for the playoffs. Down 17–6 in the 4th quarter, Brodie came off the bench after an injury to throw 2 TD passes to win the game and the division title. The second TD was a 2-yard rollout pass to Witcher in the final seconds of the game. It was one of the great 49ers moments of their history to that point.

After the 1973 season, Witcher signed with the Southern California Sun of the WFL. He was traded to the Chicago Bears during training camp, but was cut by the Bears. In his first game with the Sun, Witcher scored the winning TD with a reception against the Detroit Wheels. After a few games, Witcher left the Sun and was done with professional football.

Witcher died from liver cancer on February 22, 2021.

== NFL career statistics ==
Legend
	Led the league
**Bold**	Career high

=== Regular season ===
Year	Team	Games		Receiving				
Year	Team	GP	GS	Rec	Yds	Avg	Lng	TD
1966	SFO	14	0	10	115	11.5	24	1
1967	SFO	14	9	**46**	**705**	**15.3**	**63**	**3**
1968	SFO	14	13	39	531	13.6	59	1
1969	SFO	14	7	33	435	13.2	49	**3**
1970	SFO	11	10	22	288	13.1	28	2
1971	SFO	14	14	18	250	13.9	50	**3**
1972	SFO	14	6	3	22	7.3	17	1
1973	SFO	14	0	1	13	13.0	13	0
		109	59	172	2,359	13.7	63	14

=== Playoffs ===
Year	Team	Games		Receiving				
Year	Team	GP	GS	Rec	Yds	Avg	Lng	TD
1970	SFO	2	2	**7**	**86**	**12.3**	**26**	**2**
1971	SFO	2	2	3	34	11.3	22	0
1972	SFO	1	0	0	0	0.0	0	0
		5	4	10	120	12.0	26	2
