= List of San Francisco 49ers team records =

The list of San Francisco 49ers team records highlights a number of leader-boards inclusive of players, both past and present, for the San Francisco 49ers American football team.

== Career leaders ==
Bold denotes still active with team

Italics denote still active but not with team

These lists are accurate through the 2025 regular season.

=== Passing leaders ===
**Top 10 career**
**Name**	**Yards**	**Tenure**
Joe Montana	35,124	
John Brodie	31,548	
Steve Young	29,907	
Jeff Garcia	16,408	
Y.A. Tittle	16,016	
Alex Smith	14,280	
Jimmy Garoppolo	13,783	
**Brock Purdy**	13,145	
Colin Kaepernick	12,271	
Frankie Albert	10,795	

=== Rushing leaders ===
**Top 10 career**
**Name**	**Yards**	**Tenure**
Frank Gore	11,073	
Joe Perry	8,689	
Roger Craig	7,064	
Ken Willard	5,930	
Garrison Hearst	5,535	
J. D. Smith	4,370	
Hugh McElhenny	4,288	
**Christian McCaffrey**	3,959	
Kevan Barlow	3,614	
Steve Young	3,581	

=== Receiving leaders ===
**Top 10 career**
**Name**	**Yards**	**Tenure**
Jerry Rice	19,247	
Terrell Owens	8,572	
**George Kittle**	8,345	
Dwight Clark	6,750	
Gene Washington	6,664	
Billy Wilson	5,902	
Vernon Davis	5,640	
John Taylor	5,598	
Brent Jones	5,195	
**Deebo Samuel**	4,998	
