= Monty Stickles =

American football player (1938–2006)

- Stickles in 1961

No. 85, 87
- Position: Tight end

Personal information
- Born: August 16, 1938; Kingston, New York, U.S.
- Died: September 3, 2006 (aged 68); Oakland, California, U.S.
- Listed height: 6 ft 4 in (1.93 m)
- Listed weight: 235 lb (107 kg)

Career information
- High school: Poughkeepsie (Poughkeepsie, New York)
- College: Notre Dame
- NFL draft: 1960: 1st round, 11th overall pick
- AFL draft: 1960: 1st round

Career history
- San Francisco 49ers (1960–1967); New Orleans Saints (1968)

Awards and highlights
- Consensus All-American (1959); First-team All-American (1958)

Career NFL statistics
- Receptions: 222
- Receiving yards: 3,199
- Touchdowns: 16
- Stats at Pro Football Reference

Montford Anthony Stickles (August 16, 1938 – September 3, 2006) was an American professional football tight end in the National Football League (NFL) for the San Francisco 49ers and the New Orleans Saints. A first round draft pick in the 1960 NFL draft, Stickles was a sure-handed receiver and rugged — and sometimes dirty — blocker who carved out a nine year NFL career.

As a collegian at Notre Dame, Stickles was twice recognized as an All-American, achieving consensus status as a senior in 1959.

== Early life ==
Monty Stickles was born in Kingston, New York, on August 16, 1938, and grew up in Poughkeepsie, the son of Frances and Montfort Stickles. He was a graduate of Poughkeepsie High School.

== College career ==
Stickles played End (offensive) and kicked extra points for the Notre Dame Fighting Irish from 1957 to 1959, wearing number 80. As a collegian he stood 6'4" tall and weighed 215 pounds and gained a place on the Notre Dame squad as a three-year starter.

In 1957, he had 11 catches for 183 yards and three touchdowns. He also led the team in scoring with 11 extra points, one field goal, and three touchdowns for 32 points, made 27 tackles, and broke up two passes. In 1958, he led in minutes played and scored 60 points while making 31 tackles. He also led the team in receiving with 20 catches for 328 yards and seven touchdowns. While playing for Notre Dame he accumulated 42 career receptions for 746 yards and 12 touchdowns, kicked 42 extra points and five field goals, made 110 tackles, broke up six passes, recovered three fumbles, and blocked one kick.

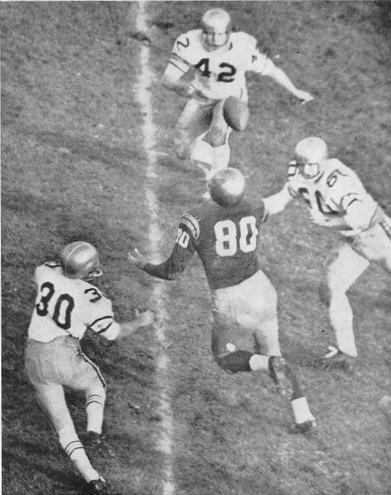
Stickles (No. 80) attempts to catch a pass during a 1959 game against the Georgia Tech Yellow Jackets.

Stickles was a two-time first-team All-American, gaining consensus status as a senior in 1959. During this senior season, he finished 9th in Heisman Trophy voting. He also participated in the East-West Shrine the College All-Star games prior to entering the NFL.

Stickles received a Bachelor of Arts degree in Sociology from Notre Dame in 1960.

== Professional career ==
Stickles was the first-round-draft-pick of the San Francisco 49ers, who made him the 11th pick of the 1960 NFL draft. He also was chosen in the first round by the Los Angeles Chargers of the newly formed American Football League (AFL) in 1960.

Stickles got his career off to a fast start, snagging eight passes in his debut game against the New York Giants. He finished the 1960 season fourth on the team among receivers, with 22 catches for 252 years.

The 1961 season was Stickles' best. During that campaign he established what would be his career-bests for receptions (43), yards gained (794), and touchdowns (5). From 1961 to 1966, Stickles would play in all but two games for the 49ers, starting in every game save four.

After eight seasons in San Francisco, Stickles was traded to the New Orleans Saints on July 5, 1968, for defensive back George Rose. He would only play the 1968 season for the Saints, starting 13 games, during which he caught 15 passes for 206 yards and 2 touchdowns.

== NFL career statistics ==
Legend
**Bold**	Career high

Year	Team	Games		Receiving				
Year	Team	GP	GS	Rec	Yds	Avg	Lng	TD
1960	SFO	12	6	22	252	11.5	28	0
1961	SFO	14	14	**43**	**794**	**18.5**	**54**	**5**
1962	SFO	14	14	22	366	16.6	48	3
1963	SFO	12	10	11	152	13.8	31	0
1964	SFO	14	14	40	685	17.1	53	3
1965	SFO	14	14	35	343	9.8	22	1
1966	SFO	14	14	27	315	11.7	38	2
1967	SFO	8	8	7	86	12.3	19	0
1968	NOR	13	13	15	206	13.7	35	2
Career		115	107	222	3,199	14.4	54	16

== Life after football ==
After his professional football career was over, Stickles went into radio broadcasting as a pioneer of sports talk radio. He also did play-by-play commentary of basketball games for the University of San Francisco on local station KEST in 1968, before moving to the big station KGO to work as an analyst for California Golden Bears football and Oakland Raiders games.

While working at KGO Radio, Stickles also worked as a weekend sportscaster for the company's television enterprise, KGO-TV. In addition, he had bit parts in two movies, Number One (1969) and Freebie and the Bean (1974).

The most memorable event of Stickles' radio career came in 1984 when he had a brief but explosive post-game interview with San Francisco Giants manager Frank Robinson. Giants relief pitcher Gary Lavelle was returning from injury, Robinson had inserted him in a game, and Lavelle had been shelled. Stickles asked Robinson whether he might have brought him back too soon. "Frank went fucking crazy," Stickles said. "We had to bleep him 23 times in 56 seconds."

Robinson would be fired later that year.

In 1985, Stickles left the world of broadcasting to take a lucrative job selling beer for a prominent Bay Area distributor. He would remain at that post for 20 years, retiring in September 2004.

== Death and legacy ==
Stickles died September 3, 2006, of heart failure following a brief illness in Oakland, California.

Never a star but a regular throughout his NFL career, Stickles was remembered as a sure-handed receiver and a rugged blocker, with a dirty streak anticipating the infamous St. Louis Cardinals lineman Conrad Dobler. When his daughter Jessica Stickles Mattos heard such a comment in the press box about her father, she took umbrage, only to have her father later admit the merit of the remark with the words, "They were right, I do play dirty."

His teammate R.C. Owens remembered Stickles as an enforcer "who would come to the defense of his teammates." Owens recalled that "these linebackers, who were some of the game's toughest, would always be looking for No. 85 of the 49ers. He was going against guys like Deacon Jones. He would get head-slapped and clothes-lined. He had to be tough."

"He was a package," recalled former 49ers announcer Lon Simmons. "He used to cheap-shot the linebacker. Then he'd tell the official to watch the guy. The linebacker would retaliate and he'd get thrown out."

He was remembered by daughter as "a devoted father" and "an eclectic person". "As a father, he was great," she told the San Francisco Chronicle at the time of his death. "He collected art, he was a gourmet chef, he loved jazz music." Himself a musician, Stickles played drums as a hobby.

== Filmography ==
Year	Title	Role	Notes
1969	Number One	Himself	
1974	Freebie and the Bean	Texas Brawler	(final film role)
