= Tom Holzer =

American football player (Born 1945)

No. 87
- Position: Defensive end

Personal information
- Born: August 2, 1945; Indianapolis, Indiana, U.S.
- Died: August 30, 2014 (aged 69); Sarasota, Florida, U.S.
- Listed height: 6 ft 4 in (1.93 m)
- Listed weight: 248 lb (112 kg)

Career information
- High school: Sacred Heart (Indianapolis)
- College: Louisville
- NFL draft: 1967: 2nd round, 39th overall pick

Career history
- San Francisco 49ers (1967)

Career NFL statistics
- Games played: 14
- Games started: 1
- Stats at Pro Football Reference

Thomas Robert Holzer (August 2, 1945) is an American former defensive end for the San Francisco 49ers of the National Football League (NFL). Holzer was born in Indianapolis, Indiana.

== Career statistics ==
Year	Team	GP	GS
1967	San Francisco 49ers	14	1
Career		14	1
