= Ken Willard =

American football player (born 1943)

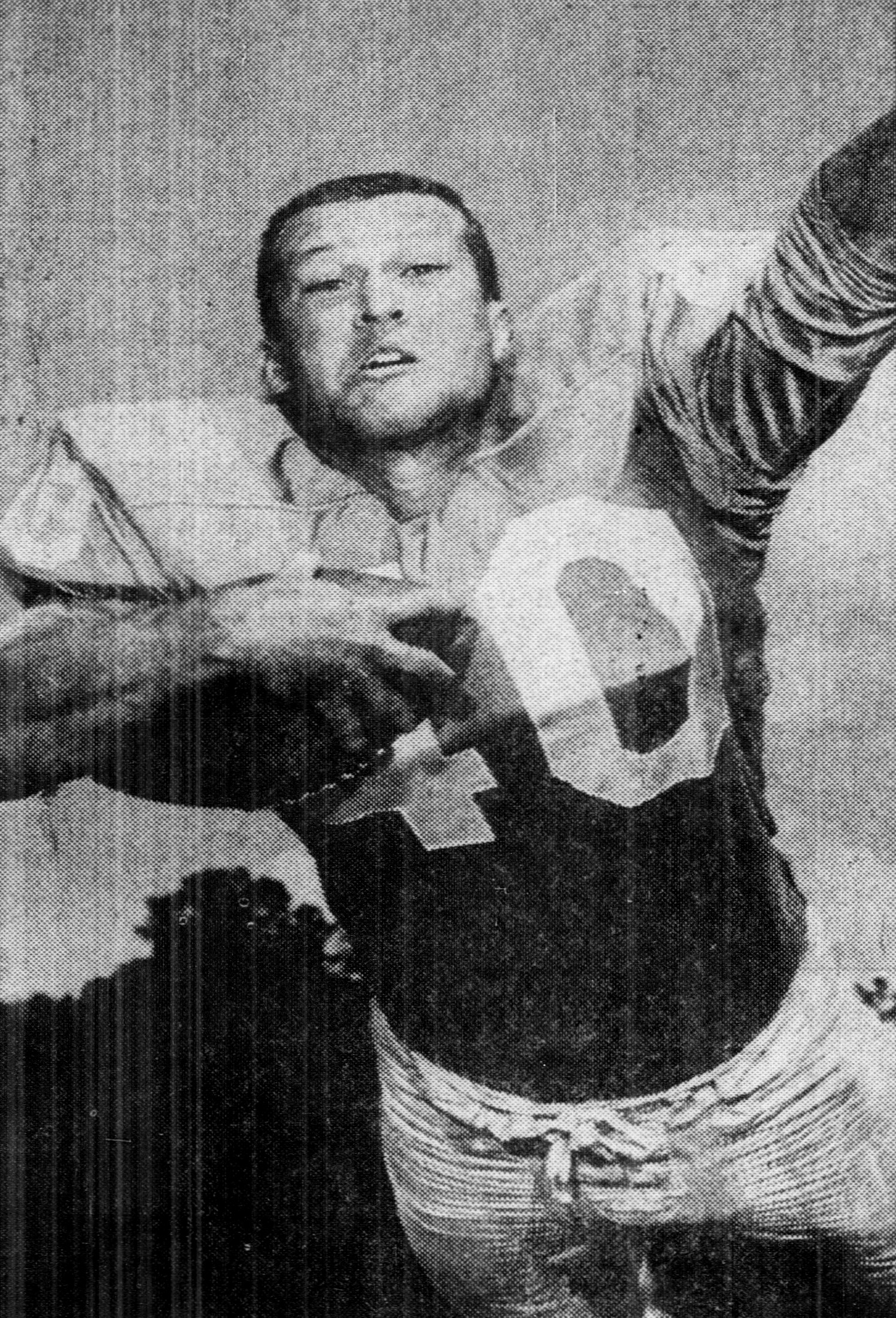
- Willard, circa 1962

No. 40, 20
- Position: Fullback

Personal information
- Born: July 14, 1943 (age 83); Richmond, Virginia, U.S.
- Listed height: 6 ft 1 in (1.85 m)
- Listed weight: 219 lb (99 kg)

Career information
- High school: Varina (Henrico, Virginia)
- College: North Carolina (1962–1964)
- NFL draft: 1965: 1st round, 2nd overall pick

Career history
- San Francisco 49ers (1965–1973); St. Louis Cardinals (1974)

Awards and highlights
- Second-team All-Pro (1965); 4× Pro Bowl (1965, 1966, 1968, 1969); Gator Bowl MVP (1963); Second-team All-American (1964); 2× First-team All-ACC (1963, 1964); Second-team All-ACC (1962)

Career NFL statistics
- Rushing yards: 6,105
- Rushing average: 3.8
- Receptions: 277
- Receiving yards: 2,184
- Total touchdowns: 62
- Stats at Pro Football Reference

Kenneth Henderson Willard (born July 14, 1943) is an American former professional football player who was a fullback in the National Football League (NFL), where he was a four-time Pro Bowler with the San Francisco 49ers in the 1960s.

== Early life ==
Willard was born on July 14, 1943, in Richmond, Virginia. He attend Varina High School where he was both an outstanding athlete, earning 16 letters in football, baseball, basketball and track; and was a member of academic honor societies. Willard was 6 ft 1 in (1.85 m), 185 pounds (83.9 kg) in high school, with both speed and strength; running the hundred-yard dash and throwing the shot and discus for the track team.

In 1957, he was a star running back on the football team at only 14-years old, also playing on defense. On his first two plays as a runner he scored touchdowns on runs of 40 yards or more, but both were called back on penalties. He then caught a short pass and ran 60 yards for a touchdown on his first official play. His brother Richard was later the team's quarterback. In 1958, he made the all-district team in football.

As a senior, he won high school awards in baseball and track. He also was a power hitter playing American Legion baseball.

== College career ==
Willard received a football scholarship from the University of North Carolina in 1961 after turning down a $100,000 offer to play baseball for the Boston Red Sox, even after being personally recruited by Hall of famer Ted Williams. It was a difficult decision for Willard to turn down playing professional baseball, but he wanted a four year college education. Willard said "'You just can't put into words what makes you decide not to take it.'" Baseball was his first love as a sport, and he thought he would get back to it after a few years of football.

He played for the Tar Heels from 1962 to 1964, where he led the Atlantic Coast Conference in rushing yards in 1963 and was named Most Valuable Player (MVP) of the same year's Gator Bowl. He received All-ACC honors in 1963 and 1964 and was selected to the College Football All-America second-team in 1964.

Willard rushed for 1,949 yards on 514 attempts over his three years at North Carolina, with 18 touchdowns. He also had 46 pass receptions for 432 yards and another touchdown. Two-way player Chris Hanburger was the center on the offensive line that blocked for Willard at North Carolina, and was All-ACC at center as a junior and senior. Hanburger went on to an NFL career at linebacker for the Washington Redskins, and induction into the Professional Football Hall of Fame.

Willard was also a member of the UNC baseball team, where he led the ACC in home runs two times and is unofficially credited with the longest home run in Tar Heel history at an estimated 525 feet (160 m). He was also named All-Conference in baseball as a senior.

== Professional career ==
Willard was drafted with the second pick of the 1965 NFL draft, by the San Francisco 49ers ahead of future NFL Hall of Famers Dick Butkus and halfback Gale Sayers. Major league baseball teams were still interested in Willard, there was a bidding war between the NFL and the American Football League (AFL), and three NFL teams, the Detroit Lions, Minnesota Vikings and 49ers were interested in drafting Willard if he would sign with them. The Lions had offered him a $25,000 bonus to sign with them, but the 49ers doubled that sum.

Willard believed he was taken as a high draft pick because his draft came during the "Big Back" era, when many teams were looking to model their offense on Vince Lombardi's Green Bay Packers backfield of Jim Taylor and Paul Hornung; rather than relying on smaller and faster running backs. In addition to Willard, first round running back picks in 1965 included large (for the time) backs like 220-pound Tucker Frederickson (No. 1), 215-pound Donny Anderson (No. 7), and 230-pound Tom Nowatzke (No. 11). Willard also believed that the big back style power runners endured longer in the NFL without injuries than smaller faster backs who would make radical cuts while running, or were more likely to be blind-sided.

He played nine seasons with the San Francisco 49ers, missing only one game because of injury. After nine years in San Francisco, Willard was traded to the St. Louis Cardinals for a third-round draft pick. His one season with the Cardinals (1974) was shortened to seven games by a left knee injury, which was operated on during the season. This was his last year in the NFL. The Cardinals placed him on injured reserve before the start of the 1975 season, although Willard wanted to play. He was released in November 1975 and retired. He opted to pass on his eleventh season after two consecutive years of knee injuries in St. Louis.

Willard was a four-time Pro Bowler, selected in 1965-66 and 1968-69. For his career, he scored 45 rushing and 17 receiving touchdowns. His best year was 1968 when he ran for 967 yards and 7 touchdowns. Willard was selected second-team All-Pro by the Associated Press (AP), Newspaper Enterprise Association (NEA) and United Press International (UPI) in 1965. In 1968, UPI named him a second-team All-Pro. He was a member of the 49ers when the team won the NFC West title in 1970, 1971 and 1972 and with the Cardinals when they won the division title in 1974.

In 1970, Willard rushed for 85 yards (with two fumbles) and had an 18-yard reception in the 49ers 17–14 win over the Minnesota Vikings in the divisional playoff round, but lost 17–10 against the Dallas Cowboys in the conference championship game (Willard rushing for 42 yards on 13 carries). In the 1971 divisional playoff round between Washington and San Francisco, a 24–20 victory for the 49ers, Willard faced off against former college teammate Chris Hanburger (Willard having 56 total yards from scrimmage); but the 49ers again lost to the Cowboys in the conference championship game, where the 49ers only had 31 offensive plays in the entire game (Willard having only six carries). In 1972, they lost to the Cowboys again, this time in the divisional round, 30–28; but Willard did not play in that game (unlike the previous four games where he was a starter).

On the retirement of Leroy Kelly, Willard became the NFL's active leader in career rushing yards for most of the 1974 season, before being passed by O. J. Simpson in Game 11. He retired with 6,105 rushing yards (then 8th all-time) and 45 rushing touchdowns (tied for 12th).

== NFL career statistics ==
=== Regular season ===
Year	Team	GP	GS	Att	Yds	TD	Rec	Yds	TD	Fum
1965	SF	14	14	189	778	5	32	253	4	7
1966	SF	14	14	191	763	5	42	351	2	7
1967	SF	13	13	169	510	5	23	242	1	1
1968	SF	14	14	227	967	7	36	232	0	4
1969	SF	14	14	171	557	7	36	326	3	6
1970	SF	14	14	236	789	7	31	259	3	3
1971	SF	14	14	216	855	4	27	202	1	8
1972	SF	14	11	100	345	4	24	131	1	3
1973	SF	14	10	83	366	1	22	160	1	2
1974	STL	7	2	40	175	0	4	28	1	0
Career		132	120	1,622	6,105	45	277	2,184	17	41

=== Postseason ===
Year	Team	GP	GS	Att	Yds	TD	Rec	Yds	TD	Fum
1970	SF	2	2	40	127	0	3	40	0	2
1971	SF	2	2	25	49	0	2	16	0	0
1974	STL	1	0	1	0	0	0	0	0	0
Career		5	4	66	176	0	5	56	0	2

== Honors ==
In 1985, he was inducted into the Virginia Sports Hall of Fame and was honored as an ACC Football Legend in 2013.

== Personal life ==
Willard operated his own business, Ken Willard Associates, dealing with employee communications.
