= Charlie Hunt =

American football player (born 1951)

No. 61, 55
- Position: Linebacker

Personal information
- Born: February 1, 1951 (age 75); St. Augustine, Florida, U.S.
- Listed height: 6 ft 2 in (1.88 m)
- Listed weight: 215 lb (98 kg)

Career information
- High school: Samuel W. Wofson
- College: Florida State
- NFL draft: 1973: 10th round, 253rd overall pick

Career history
- San Francisco 49ers (1973); Jacksonville Express (1975); Tampa Bay Buccaneers (1976)
- Stats at Pro Football Reference

Charles Edward Hunt (born February 1, 1951, in St. Augustine, Florida) was a linebacker in the National Football League who played for the San Francisco 49ers in 1973 and the Tampa Bay Buccaneers in 1976. He attended Samuel W. Wolfson High School and then Florida State University before being drafted in the 10th round, 253rd overall, of the 1973 NFL draft by the 49ers.
