= Dennis Morrison =

American football player (born 1951)

No. 10
- Position: Quarterback

Personal information
- Born: May 18, 1951 (age 75); Pico Rivera, California, U.S.
- Listed height: 6 ft 3 in (1.91 m)
- Listed weight: 211 lb (96 kg)

Career information
- College: Kansas State
- NFL draft: 1973: 14th round, 357th overall pick

Career history
- San Francisco 49ers (1973–1974)

Career NFL statistics
- Passing attempts: 51
- Passing completions: 21
- Completion percentage: 41.2%
- TD–INT: 1–5
- Passing yards: 227
- Passer rating: 21.9
- Stats at Pro Football Reference

Dennis Morrison (born May 18, 1951) is an American former professional football player who was a quarterback for the San Francisco 49ers. A left-handed thrower, he played college football for the Kansas State Wildcats.
