= John Brodie =

American football player and golfer (1935–2026)

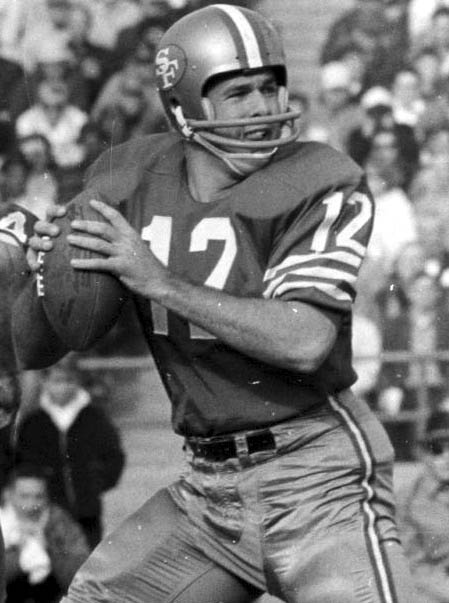
- Brodie, circa 1966

No. 12
- Position: Quarterback

Personal information
- Born: August 14, 1935; San Francisco, California, U.S.
- Died: January 23, 2026 (aged 90); Solana Beach, California, U.S.
- Listed height: 6 ft 1 in (1.85 m)
- Listed weight: 198 lb (90 kg)

Career information
- High school: Oakland Tech (Oakland, California)
- College: Stanford (1953–1956)
- NFL draft: 1957: 1st round, 3rd overall pick

Career history
- San Francisco 49ers (1957–1973)

Awards and highlights
- NFL Most Valuable Player (1970); NFL Comeback Player of the Year (1965); First-team All-Pro (1970); Second-team All-Pro (1965); 2× Pro Bowl (1965, 1970); 2× NFL passing touchdowns leader (1965, 1970); 3× NFL passing yards leader (1965, 1968, 1970); NFL passer rating leader (1970); 2× NFL completion percentage leader (1958, 1965); San Francisco 49ers Hall of Fame; San Francisco 49ers No. 12 retired; Consensus All-American (1956); NCAA passing yards leader (1956); 2× First-team All-PCC (1955, 1956)

Career NFL statistics
- Passing attempts: 4,491
- Passing completions: 2,469
- Completion percentage: 55.0%
- TD–INT: 214–224
- Passing yards: 31,548
- Passer rating: 72.3
- Stats at Pro Football Reference
- College Football Hall of Fame
- Golf career
- Nationality: United States
- Sport: Golf
- College: Stanford
- Status: Professional
- Former tour: Senior PGA Tour
- Professional wins: 1

Number of wins by tour
- PGA Tour Champions: 1

Best results in major championships
- Masters Tournament: DNP
- PGA Championship: DNP
- U.S. Open: CUT: 1959, 1981
- The Open Championship: DNP

John Riley Brodie (August 14, 1935 – January 23, 2026) was an American professional football player who was a quarterback for the San Francisco 49ers of the National Football League (NFL) for 17 seasons. He had a second career as a Senior PGA Tour professional golfer and was a television broadcaster for both sports.

Brodie excelled at college football and golf for Stanford University, earning consensus All-American honors in football as a senior in 1956. He was selected by the 49ers in the first round of the 1957 NFL draft with the third overall pick. He started a total of 17 games in his first four seasons combined before the trade of Y. A. Tittle saw Brodie tabbed as the primary starter for the next decade starting in 1962. Brodie won three passing titles for San Francisco to go along with leading the league in passing touchdowns once. He was named the NFL Most Valuable Player (MVP) in 1970 after leading the 49ers to a 10–3–1 record and their first playoff appearance in 13 years. Brodie led the team to three consecutive NFC West divisional titles but lost each time in the playoffs to the Dallas Cowboys. He retired in 1973 to focus his time on the Church of Scientology, which he later disavowed. A two-time Pro Bowler, Brodie retired ranked third in career passing yards in NFL history.

== Early life ==
Born in San Francisco, California, on August 14, 1935, Brodie grew up in the Montclair district of Oakland and attended Montclair Grammar (later Elementary) School. He was a standout athlete at Oakland Technical High School.

== College career ==
Brodie played college football across the San Francisco Bay at Stanford University. In his senior season of 1956, Brodie was a consensus All-American. He rejected having an athletic scholarship from Stanford, instead playing as a walk-on while also playing on the Stanford golf team, which kept him out of spring football drills.

He nearly chose golf for his sporting career, turning professional following completion of his time on the Stanford team and playing in several tournaments on the PGA Tour.

Brodie later said of his first golfing experience:

You talk about pressure. I was always worried that I wasn't going to make the cut. Fact is there was only one time I was close enough to say I was in competition in the final round. I had to make up my mind. I couldn't be pro in two sports and do justice to either one.

== Professional career ==
A fresh-faced John Brodie ahead of the 1961 season.

=== Football career ===
Brodie was the third overall selection of the 1957 NFL draft and saw limited action as a rookie with the 49ers in 1957, where he was tabbed to the bench with Y. A. Tittle already serving as the starting quarterback. Brodie got the start for the final game of the 1957 season, where he went 5-of-12 for 75 yards and two interceptions in a 27–20 win over the Green Bay Packers. He got more playing time in 1958 due to a poor preseason by Tittle. After a poor 1958 preseason by Tittle, head coach Frankie Albert started Brodie at quarterback for the 1958 season. Brodie was tabbed as the Week 1 starter versus Pittsburgh and went 19-of-28 for an interception and 244 yards with a rushing touchdown as the 49ers won 23–20. Brodie started seven of the first eight games of the season, which saw him have two 200-yard games and his first passing touchdown on October 19 versus Philadelphia, although the move was not received as warmly by fans, with a game versus Detroit seeing a roar from the crowd when Brodie was replaced by Tittle late as he proceeded to lead the team downfield for the winning score. The 49ers were 3–4 in games started by Brodie, who threw for 1,224 yards with six touchdowns and 13 interceptions and a passer rating of 61.8. He continued to share time with Tittle through 1960. In that same year, head coach Red Hickey adopted the shotgun formation late in the season with Brodie as QB due to Tittle having a groin injury. Having started the shotgun formation against Baltimore in Week 9, the 49ers won three of the last four games to finish 7–5; in total, Brodie went 4–4 as starter. He became the starter in 1961 upon the trade of Tittle to the New York Giants in August 1961.

In his first full season as a starter, Brodie passed for 2,588 yards with 14 touchdowns to 12 interceptions with a league-leading 9.1 yards per attempt as the 49ers went 7–6–1. In the following season, Brodie threw for 2,272 yards with 18 touchdowns to 16 interceptions with a passer rating of 79.0 as the Niners with 6–7. In May 1963, Brodie suffered a hairline fracture of his right arm in a car accident where he was the driver. He had a cast on his arm for three weeks and reported to camp, but his arm gave him trouble when he started preseason play. In the third week of the regular season, he reinjured the arm that saw him sidelined for the rest of the season. 1964 was not as promising for Brodie, although he started all twelve games. As the 49ers went 3–9, Brodie passed for 2,498 yards with 14 touchdowns to 16 interceptions with a passer rating at 64.6. His best statistical year would come with 1965, when he led the league in completions (242) passing yards (3,112) and passing touchdowns (30), leading to his first Pro Bowl appearance. He was named the NFL Comeback Player of the Year. Brodie has his best game in touchdowns against Minnesota on November 28, going 10-of-19 for five touchdowns and 209 yards as the 49ers won 45–24. It was his first and only five-touchdown game.

Following his outstanding 1965 season, in which he made about $35,000, Brodie was courted by the Houston Oilers of the rival AFL. Newspaper reports indicated that a contract with the Oilers paying between $650,000 and $1 million had been arranged. After the NFL Giants signed kicker Pete Gogolak from the AFL champion Bills, offers to Brodie and other NFL stars, like Mike Ditka and Roman Gabriel, expedited the merger agreement between the two leagues in June 1966. An improved contract offer from the 49ers moved Brodie to stay put in San Francisco, however, and a multi-year deal paying Brodie $900,000 over several seasons was instead inked.

The 1970 season proved to be particularly stellar for Brodie. During that year, he led the entire NFL with 24 touchdown passes, 223 completions, 2,941 yards, and a passer rating of 93.8, while taking a league low eight sacks as the 49ers went 10–3–1 and reached the playoffs for the first time in over a decade. Brodie also paced NFL quarterbacks with a league-leading 2.6% of his passes resulting in interception. Brodie's outstanding season was rewarded when he received the 1970 NFL Most Valuable Player Award, and the 49ers offense led the league with 352 points. In the Divisional Round matchup against the Minnesota Vikings, Brodie went 16-of-32 for 201 yards with a passing and rushing touchdown; his touchdown plunge in the fourth quarter ultimately proved the difference in the 17–14 victory. The 49ers were matched against the Dallas Cowboys in the inaugural NFC Championship Game for the right to go to Super Bowl V. Brodie went 19-of-40 for 262 yards with a touchdown and two interceptions as the Cowboys defeated San Francisco 17–10. Brodie's final season as the primary starter came in 1971. He threw for 2,642 yards with 18 touchdowns to 24 interceptions as the team went 9–5 and reached the postseason once again. In the Divisional Round versus Washington, Brodie went 10-of-19 for 176 yards with two touchdowns as San Francisco won 24–20. Once again, the 49ers met the Cowboys in the NFC Championship Game. Brodie was even less successful in his second go against Dallas, throwing 14-of-30 for 184 yards with three interceptions as the Cowboys won 14–3.

The 1972 season saw Brodie as the primary starter, but he suffered an ankle injury in the October 15 game against the New York Giants that saw him sidelined for backup Steve Spurrier. While he was only slated to miss a few weeks, Brodie ended up being on the sidelines for nearly the rest of the regular season as Steve Spurrier manned the QB position. In the final game of the year, the 49ers needed a victory to win the NFC West or else they would be eliminated. Facing the Minnesota Vikings, head coach Dick Nolan decided to take out Spurrier with less than two minutes to go in the third quarter with the Vikings leading 17–6. To the roar of the crowd, Brodie came onto the field, with Nolan telling him to call his own plays as usual. Brodie threw two interceptions, but the 49ers valiantly battled back under Brodie, who threw a touchdown pass to Gene Washington midway through the fourth quarter that capped off a 99-yard drive with six minutes to go. When the defense forced a stop, Brodie got the ball back with 1:39 to go at the 36-yard line needing a touchdown. He drove them down the field and closed it off with a touchdown pass to Dick Witcher with 25 seconds remaining; the Vikings subsequently missed a field goal that would've ended the game in a tie as the 49ers won 20–17. Once again, the 49ers were matched up against the Cowboys in the playoffs, this time in the Divisional Round. Brodie passed for 12-of-22 for 150 yards with two interceptions but Vic Washington and Larry Schreiber aided the 49ers to a 28–13 lead by the fourth quarter. However, the Cowboys sprang to a miraculous comeback that saw them score 17 unanswered points to prevail 30–28.

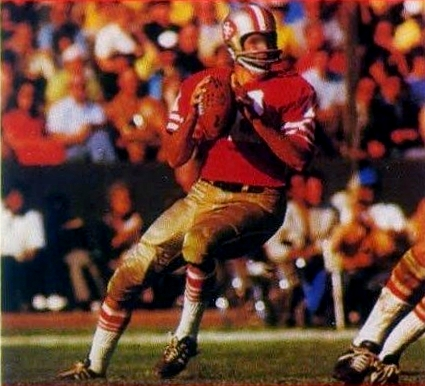
Brodie later in his career with the 49ers circa 1972–73.

Brodie was the starter for the start of the 1973 season. He ended up starting the first four games before giving way to Spurrier and Joe Reed. As a whole, Brodie made six starts as he announced his retirement weeks prior to the end of the season. Brodie stated that while he likely could have played a few more years as a 38-year old QB, he wanted to focus his attention to his priorities of the Church of Scientology, with his intended mission being to serve as a Bay Area director of their action arm of the church in Narconon by going through studies. He was given the start for the final game of the season against the Pittsburgh Steelers on December 15. He went 6-of-12 for 79 yards and two interceptions in the 37–14 loss.

=== Legacy ===
When Brodie retired from the NFL at the end of the 1973 season, he ranked third in career passing yards, behind only Johnny Unitas and Fran Tarkenton. He ranked eighth in touchdown passes upon his retirement and stayed in the top ten for most touchdown passes from 1970 to 1988. On each list, only he and one other player are not in the Pro Football Hall of Fame (Babe Parilli and John Hadl, respectively). He is one of twelve players to have won the passing title three times. Cowboys head coach Tom Landry was once quoted as stating: “I marvel at the way he has now mastered the art of quarterback" while John Madden stated Brodie threw the screen pass better than anyone he ever saw. Brodie was 74–76–8 as starter for the 49ers; he was passed in wins by Joe Montana and Steve Young but Brodie still holds the record for most starts (and most losses) for all 49er quarterbacks. The 49ers retired his No. 12 jersey. In 1986, Brodie was inducted into the College Football Hall of Fame In 2010, Brodie was inducted into the African-American Ethnic Sports Hall of Fame, becoming the first European-American so honored.

In 2004, Brodie was named to the Professional Football Researchers Association Hall of Very Good in the association's second HOVG class. In 2006, Brodie's number 12 jersey was brought out of retirement and worn by Trent Dilfer, backup quarterback for the 49ers. Dilfer, a close personal friend of Brodie, hoped to bring attention to Brodie's bid for enshrinement in the Pro Football Hall of Fame. In 2009, Brodie was inducted into the San Francisco 49ers Hall of Fame inaugural class.

== Post-football career ==
=== Broadcast career ===
After he retired from football, Brodie served as an NFL football and golf analyst for NBC Sports. He spent two seasons (1977 and 1978) as the network's No. 1 NFL analyst, alongside play-by-play man Curt Gowdy, and called Super Bowl XIII in January 1979. Among the other notable NFL games he worked was the "Red Right 88" game, the January 1981 AFC Divisional playoff game between the Oakland Raiders and Cleveland Browns at frigid Cleveland Stadium, along with the Epic in Miami, the January 1982 AFC playoff game between the San Diego Chargers and Miami Dolphins, with play-by-play man Don Criqui. He and Criqui also called the 1984 Orange Bowl, which saw the Miami Hurricanes clinch their first national championship, defeating then–No. 1 Nebraska 31–30 by stopping the Cornhuskers' two-point conversion attempt with 48 seconds remaining. Brodie left broadcasting in 1985 to try out for the Senior PGA Tour (now the PGA Tour Champions).

=== Golf career ===
Brodie competed as a professional golfer on the Senior PGA Tour from 1985 to 1998. He had one win and twelve top-ten finishes, earning a total of $735,000. He appeared in the U.S. Open twice, missing the cut in both 1959 and 1981, while setting a record for the longest gap between Open appearances.

== NFL career statistics ==
Legend
*	Led the league
**Bold**	Career high

=== Regular season ===
Year	Team	Games			Passing									Rushing					Sacks	
Year	Team	GP	GS	Record	Cmp	Att	Pct	Yds	Y/A	Lng	TD	Int	Rtg	Att	Yds	Avg	Lng	TD	Sck	Yds
1957	SFO	5	1	1–0	11	21	52.4	160	7.6	28	2	3	69.6	2	0	0.0	0	0	–	–
1958	SFO	12	6	3–3	103	172	59.9*	1,224	7.1	61	6	13	61.8	11	−12	−1.1	6	1	–	–
1959	SFO	12	2	1–1	30	64	46.9	354	5.5	34	2	7	35.0	5	6	1.2	6	0	–	–
1960	SFO	11	8	4–4	103	207	49.8	1,111	5.4	65	6	9	57.5	18	171	**9.5**	30	1	13	189
1961	SFO	14	14	7–6–1	155	283	54.8	2,588	**9.1***	70	14	12	84.7	28	90	3.2	29	2	19	141
1962	SFO	14	13	6–7	175	304	57.6	2,272	7.5	80	18	16	79.0	**37**	**258**	7.0	21	**4**	**33**	**349**
1963	SFO	3	3	0–3	30	61	49.2	367	6.0	44	3	4	57.2	7	63	9.0	24	0	1	5
1964	SFO	14	12	3–9	193	392	49.2	2,498	6.4	**83**	14	16	64.6	27	135	5.0	**38**	2	17	178
1965	SFO	13	13	7–5–1	**242***	391*	61.9*	**3,112***	8.0	59	**30***	16	**95.3**	15	60	4.0	13	1	14	101
1966	SFO	14	13	5–6–2	232	**427**	54.3	2,810	6.6	65	16	22	65.8	5	18	3.6	7	3	20	165
1967	SFO	14	10	5–5	168	349	48.1	2,013	5.8	63	11	16	57.6	20	147	7.4	15	1	18	129
1968	SFO	14	14	7–6–1	234*	404*	57.9	3,020*	7.5	65	22	21*	78.0	18	71	3.9	15	0	25	159
1969	SFO	13	10	2–6–2	194	347	55.9	2,405	6.9	80	16	15	74.9	11	62	5.6	15	0	16	134
1970	SFO	14	14	**10–3–1**	223*	378	59.0	2,941*	7.8	79	24*	10	93.8*	9	29	3.2	12	2	8	67
1971	SFO	14	14	9–5	208	387	53.7	2,642	6.8	71	18	**24**	65.0	14	45	3.2	12	3	11	111
1972	SFO	6	5	2–3	70	110	**63.6**	905	8.2	53	9	8	86.4	3	8	2.7	4	1	8	39
1973	SFO	14	6	2–4	98	194	50.5	1,126	5.8	66	3	12	47.7	5	16	3.2	14	1	4	29
Career		201	158	74–76–8	2,469	4,491	55.0	31,548	7.0	83	214	224	72.3	235	1,167	5.0	38	22	207	1,855

=== Playoffs ===
Year	Team	Games			Passing									Rushing					Sacks	
Year	Team	GP	GS	Record	Cmp	Att	Pct	Yds	Y/A	Lng	TD	Int	Rtg	Att	Yds	Avg	Lng	TD	Sck	Yds
1970	SFO	2	2	**1–1**	**35***	**72***	48.6	**463**	6.4	42	**2**	2	**67.1**	**2**	**4**	**2.0**	**3**	**1**	**3**	**24**
1971	SFO	2	2	**1–1**	24	49	49.0	360	**7.3**	**78***	**2**	**3**	61.6	0	0	0.0	0	0	2	9
1972	SFO	1	1	0–1	12	22	**54.5***	150	6.8	52	0	2	38.1	0	0	0.0	0	0	0	0
Career		5	5	2–3	71	143	49.7	973	6.8	78	4	7	60.7	2	4	2.0	3	1	5	33

== Golf career statistics ==
=== Senior PGA Tour wins (1) ===
No.	Date	Tournament	Winning score	Margin of victory	Runners-up
1	Oct 27, 1991	Security Pacific Senior Classic	−13 (66–66–68=200)	Playoff	(United States) George Archer, (United States) Chi-Chi Rodríguez

Senior PGA Tour playoff record (1–0)

No.	Year	Tournament	Opponents	Result
1	1991	Security Pacific Senior Classic	(United States) George Archer, (United States) Chi-Chi Rodríguez	Won with birdie on first extra hole

=== Results in major championships ===
Tournament	1959	1960	1961	1962	1963	1964	1965	1966	1967	1968	1969
U.S. Open	CUT										

Tournament	1970	1971	1972	1973	1974	1975	1976	1977	1978	1979
U.S. Open										

Tournament	1980	1981
U.S. Open		CUT

Did not play

CUT = missed the halfway cut
Note: Brodie only played in the U.S. Open.

== Personal life and death ==
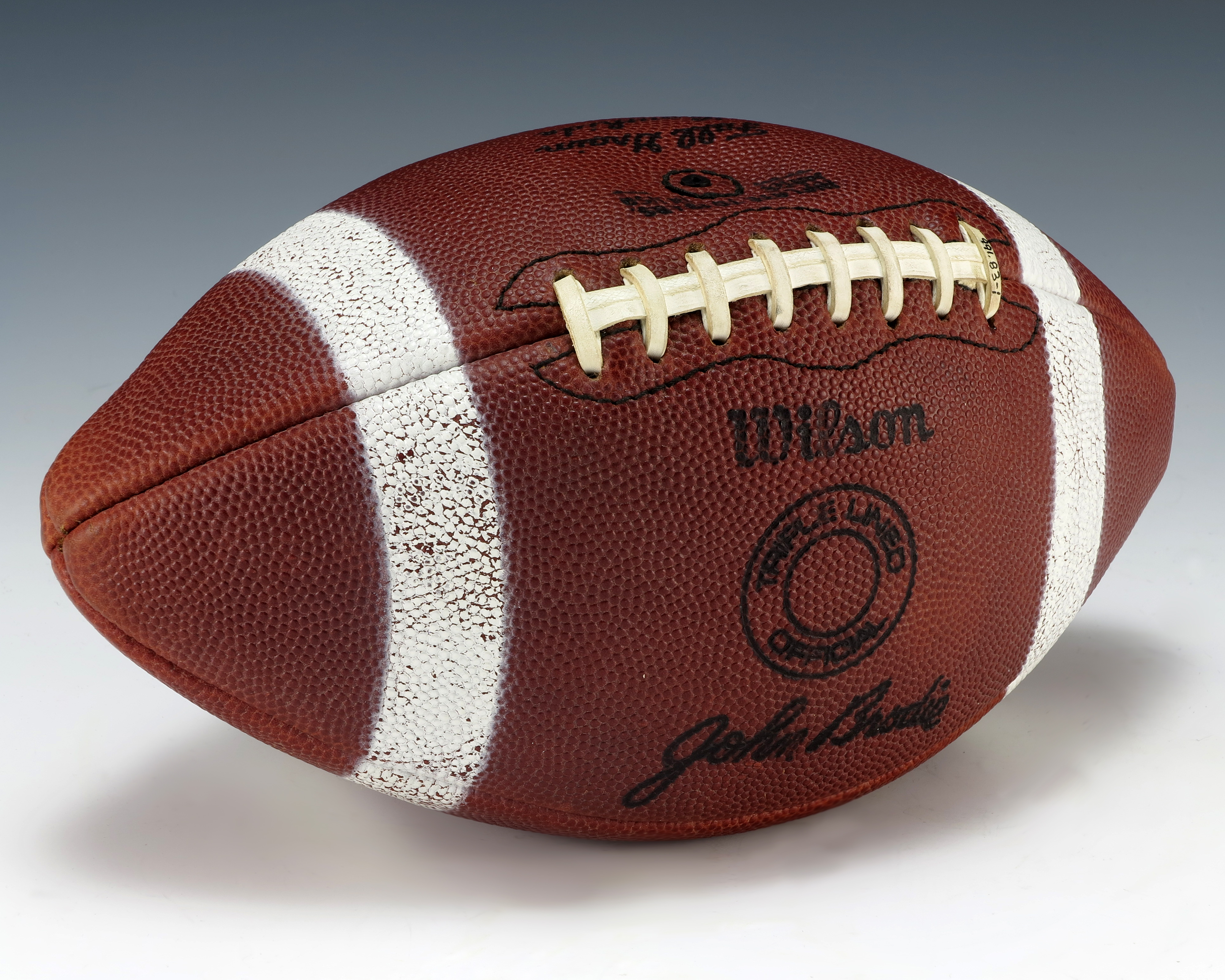
A football signed by Brodie, given to President Gerald Ford.

Brodie married Susan Blevins, a fellow Stanford student from Woodside, in 1957. They had four daughters and a son together and 12 grandchildren. One of his daughters, Erin, found fame on television in 2003 during the first season of the reality series For Love or Money. She married dermatologist and reality TV personality Dr. Will Kirby. Another daughter, Diane, was married until 2011 to former NFL quarterback Chris Chandler.

During the 1969 season, Brodie experienced tendinitis in his throwing arm, which caused him to miss two and a half games. He received cortisone shots in an effort to remedy the problem, without apparent success. In desperation for relief, Brodie was introduced to a representative of the Church of Scientology, who—Brodie insisted at the time—used Dianetics-based techniques to eliminate the tendinitis by the following week. Thus began a connection between Brodie and the church. Brodie was for years thereafter one of the leading celebrity endorsers of the Church of Scientology. This public role was ultimately ended when several of Brodie's friends were expelled or harassed in a power struggle with the Church's hierarchy. While professing continued admiration for the teachings of church founder L. Ron Hubbard, "there were many in the church I felt were treated unfairly," Brodie told the Los Angeles Times in 1990. Brodie also spent time exploring the human potential movement led by Michael Murphy with the Esalen Institute that saw Brodie help start a short-lived Esalen Sports Center.

Brodie suffered a major stroke in 2000, rendering speech difficult for him; in his later years, he traveled to Russia for stem cell treatments. He died in Solana Beach, California, on January 23, 2026, at the age of 90.

== See also ==
- Bay Area Sports Hall of Fame
- List of NCAA major college football yearly passing leaders
- List of NCAA major college football yearly total offense leaders

== Footnotes ==
Preceded by Don Meredith	NFL on NBC lead analyst 1977–1978	Succeeded by Merlin Olsen
Preceded by Don Meredith	Super Bowl television color commentator (AFC package carrier); 1978	Succeeded by Merlin Olsen
