= Ed Hardy (American football) =

American football player (born 1951)

No. 63
- Position: Offensive guard

Personal information
- Born: March 11, 1951 (age 75); Magee, Mississippi, U.S.
- Listed height: 6 ft 4 in (1.93 m)
- Listed weight: 242 lb (110 kg)

Career information
- College: Jackson State
- NFL draft: 1972: 7th round, 175th overall pick

Career history
- San Francisco 49ers (1972–1974)
- Stats at Pro Football Reference

Edgar Charles Hardy (born March 11, 1951) is an American former professional football player who was an offensive guard for the San Francisco 49ers of the National Football League (NFL). He played college football for the Jackson State Tigers.

The 49ers selected Hardy in the seventh round of the 1972 NFL draft with the 175th overall pick. He was placed on the 49ers' taxi squad for the 1972 season. In 1973 he was injured in training camp but was activated later in the season and played in three games for the 49ers – October 14 against the Minnesota Vikings, October 21 against the New Orleans Saints and October 28 against the Atlanta Falcons. His season was cut short ny a knee injury and he required surgery in the offseason. His NFL career ended when he injured his knee again in a 1974 49ers preseason game against the Kansas City Chiefs.
