= Elmer Collett =

American football player (born 1944)

- Collett in 1977

No. 66
- Position: Guard

Personal information
- Born: November 7, 1944 (age 81); Oakland, California, U.S.
- Listed height: 6 ft 6 in (1.98 m)
- Listed weight: 244 lb (111 kg)

Career information
- High school: Tamalpais (Mill Valley, California)
- College: San Francisco State (1963–1966)
- NFL draft: 1966: 14th round, 208th overall pick
- AFL draft: 1966: Red Shirt 10th round, 87th overall pick

Career history
- San Francisco 49ers (1967–1972); Baltimore Colts (1973–1977)

Awards and highlights
- Pro Bowl (1969)

Career NFL statistics
- Games played: 145
- Games started: 101
- Fumble recoveries: 4
- Stats at Pro Football Reference

Charles Elmer Collett (/ˈkɔːlɛt/ KAWL-eht; born November 7, 1944) is an American former professional football player who was a guard for 11 seasons in the National Football League (NFL) for the San Francisco 49ers and the Baltimore Colts. Collett did not miss a game during his first ten seasons in the NFL; and had a 144 consecutive game streak end because of back issues early in his final season (1977). Collett was selected to play in the Pro Bowl in the 1969 NFL season. He was considered the leader of the Colts' offensive lines of the mid-1970s when the Colts became a playoff level team once again. Collett played college football at San Francisco State College where he received multiple honors for his play at guard in 1965 and 1966; and is a member of the San Francisco State University Athletics Hall of Fame.

== Early life ==
Collett was born on November 7, 1944, in Oakland, California. Collett's father, Charles Elmer Collett, participated in the 1924 Olympics as a member of the United States' water polo team; was the commander of an escort carrier during World War II, and was decorated for bravery after saving many of his crewmen after his ship sunk; and worked as a lawyer for over 20 years in the office of the United States Attorney for the Northern District of California, including as chief assistant U.S. Attorney from 1964 to 1968.

Collett attended Tamalpais High School, located in Mill Valley, California; graduating in 1962. Collett began high school as a 5 ft 6 in (1.68 m) 118 lb (53.5 kg) freshman, but was 6 ft 3 in (1.91 m) 205 lb (93 kg) at the time he graduated. He had two knee surgeries during his junior year of high school, requiring him to wear leg braces. Collett played offensive tackle and defensive guard on the school's football team. He also played on Tamalpais' baseball team, and was on the wrestling team; participating in the unlimited weight class.

== College career ==
Collett attended the College of Marin, where he played football in 1962 and 1963 at offensive tackle. He did not play football during the 1964 season. He transferred to San Francisco State College (now San Francisco State University), where he played college football in 1965 and 1966 in the Far Western Conference. He was the team captain as a senior. Collett was said to be 6 ft 4 in (1.93 m) 235 lb (106.6 kg) as a senior.

Collett played offensive guard at San Francisco State. In 1965, he was an Associated Press (AP) first-team Little All-West Coast guard, and an Associated Press honorable mention Little All-American. United Press International (UPI) selected Collett second-team Little All-West Coast in 1965. Collett was selected first-team All-Far Western Conference in both 1965 and 1966. UPI named Collett to its Little All-Coast team at guard in 1966. He was also reported to be an honorable mention All-American in 1966.

== Professional career ==
=== San Francisco 49ers ===
The San Francisco 49ers selected Collett in the 14th round of the 1966 NFL draft, 208th overall; as a redshirt. The Kansas City Chiefs selected him in the 10th round of the 1966 American Football League draft, 87th overall. Collett was eligible to play his senior season at San Francisco State in 1966, and then chose to join the 49ers for the 1967 season. During the fifth game of the 1967 season, the 49ers' starting left guard John Thomas suffered knee injuries ending his season. Collett replaced Thomas, starting nine games as a rookie left guard in 1967.

Collett started all 14 games for the 49ers in 1968 at left guard. The 49ers' offensive line that season included Len Rohde at left tackle, Bruce Bosley at center, Howard Mudd at right guard, and Cas Banaszek at right tackle. The 49ers had the second most passing yards in the NFL that season, while giving up the fifth fewest quarterback sacks with the third lowest sack percentage. Collett started all 14 games again during the 1969 season; and was selected to play in the Pro Bowl for the only time in his career. With Forrest Blue now at center and Woody Peoples at right guard, the 49ers were tied for fifth in fewest sacks, and led the NFL in passing yards.

Collett was injured during the 1970 preseason, and Randy Beisler won the job as the 49ers' starting left guard even after Collett's return. Collett started three games that season at guard. Beisler was again the starter in 1971 and 1972, with Collett a reserve in all 14 games each of those seasons. Collett also played on special teams. Collett had ongoing problems with his back during this period.

In July of 1972, Collett ran the fastest time among all of the team's players in the 49ers annual 1¾ mile race, used by coach Dick Nolan to test the players' fitness. Linemen like Collett had to run the race in less than 15 minutes to pass, while the lighter players like backs and receivers had to finish in under 12 minutes. Collett led everyone, finishing the race in 10 minutes and 45 seconds.

=== Baltimore Colts ===
In June of 1973, the 49ers traded Collett to the Baltimore Colts for a 1975 third round draft selection. Collett started all 14 games for the Colts at right guard during the 1973 season; the Colts finishing with a 4–10 record. He was in pain during the season because of his back problems, but kept playing. Offseason surgery helped Collett, and he was able to continue as a starting guard for the Colts in the ensuing years.

Collett started all 14 games again in 1974, on a 2–12 Colts team. In 1975, the Colts went 10–4 and won their division for the first time in six years. The Colts listed him at 6 ft 4 in 240 lb (108.9 kg) going into the 1975 season. Collett again started all 14 games that year, and started in the team's first round playoff loss to the eventual Super Bowl champion Pittsburgh Steelers. Colts' offensive line coach Whitey Dovell described Collett as a "human machine" because of his exceptional stamina, endurance, and determination to complete every level of task. Dovell credited Collett with being the "pace-maker" for the 1975 Colts, through Collett's "'work habits and great attitude. He's a never-say-die type of person who gives as much at the end as he does at the beginning'".

The Colts were 11–3 in 1976, and were again first in their division. For the fourth consecutive season with the Colts, Collett started all 14 games. The 1976 Baltimore Colts led the 28-team NFL in total yards and passing yards; and quarterback Bert Jones was the NFL's Most Valuable Player that season. The Colts were also seventh in rushing as a team that season. Jones later said of Collett, "'Elmer has the strongest paws you've ever seen, and he was as good a pulling guard as I ever played with'".

Collett started the first four games of the 1977 season, but was unable to play in the fifth game because of back spasms. He had never missed a game in his NFL career before that, playing in 144 consecutive games for the 49ers and Colts; and had started 60 consecutive regular season games as a Colt. At the time of his injury, he was still highly regarded by the Colts. Whitey Dovell said of Collett that October, "'He's been All-Pro the three years I've been here but nobody knows it. He's the leader on the line, has the greatest work habits of any man I've met on or off the field. He's set the pace for the rest of the guys since '75'".

He started one more game that season (the following week, October 23), which would be the last game of his career. Collett was placed on injured reserve in early November. Collett underwent back surgery during the 1977 season. His back condition did not improve sufficiently to allow him to play the following season, and Collett announced his retirement in July 1978.

== Honors ==
Collett was induced into the San Francisco State University Athletics Hall of Fame in 1990. He was inducted into the College of Marin Hall of Fame in 2013.

== Personal life ==
In 1970, Collett began diving for gold in Northern California. While playing with the Colts, he staked a 20-acre gold mining claim at the Yuba River, in the Sierra foothills on the river's Middle Fork. After his playing career ended, Collett lived in California. He became a firefighter in Kentfield, California, and worked at that job for 28 years. Collett later became a part-time chimney sweep. Collett also was an avid surfer until physically unable to do that any longer. He resides in Stinson Beach, California.

Collett and his wife, Lisa Blackburn of Sunnyvale, California, were married in 1980. They have two sons. Collett's son Casey was the roommate of Bert Jones's son at Louisiana State University.
