= Dave Hettema =

American football player (born 1942)

No. 62, 75, 68
- Position: Offensive tackle

Personal information
- Born: November 7, 1942 (age 83); Pasadena, California, U.S.
- Listed height: 6 ft 5 in (1.96 m)
- Listed weight: 250 lb (113 kg)

Career information
- High school: Pasadena
- College: New Mexico (1964-1965)
- NFL draft: 1965: 16th round, 212th overall pick
- AFL draft: 1965: Red Shirt 10th round, 79th overall pick

Career history
- San Francisco 49ers (1966–1967); San Jose Apaches (1967); Atlanta Falcons (1969–1971)

Career NFL statistics
- Games played: 13
- Stats at Pro Football Reference

David Gary Hettema (born November 7, 1942) is an American former professional football player who was a tackle in the National Football League (NFL). He played college football for the New Mexico Lobos from 1962 to 1965, and played in the NFL for the San Francisco 49ers in 1967 and Atlanta Falcons in 1970.

== Early life ==
Hettema was born in 1942 in Pasadena, California, and attended Pasadena School. He played college football for the New Mexico Lobos from 1962 to 1965.

== Professional football ==
He was selected by the San Francisco 49ers in the 16th round (212th overall pick) of the 1965 NFL draft. He signed with the 49ers in December 1965, receiving a $10,000 bonus. He played for the 49ers' taxi squad in 1966 and appeared in seven games for the club during the 1967 season.

He also played for the Atlanta Falcons during the 1969 and 1970 seasons. He sustained an injury in a preseason game in 1969 that caused him to miss the season. In 1970, he appeared in six games for the Falcons. He was released by the Falcons in September 1971.

He also played for the San Jose Apaches of the Continental Football League in 1967.
