= Bob Windsor =

American football player (born 1942)

No. 89, 86
- Position: Tight end

Personal information
- Born: December 19, 1942 (age 83); Washington, D.C., U.S.
- Listed height: 6 ft 4 in (1.93 m)
- Listed weight: 220 lb (100 kg)

Career information
- High school: Montgomery Blair (Silver Spring, Maryland)
- College: Kentucky
- NFL draft: 1966: 2nd round, 26th overall pick
- AFL draft: 1966: Red Shirt 1st round, 8th overall pick

Career history
- San Francisco 49ers (1967–1971); New England Patriots (1972–1975)

Career NFL statistics
- Receptions: 185
- Receiving yards: 2,307
- Receiving touchdowns: 14
- Stats at Pro Football Reference

Robert Edward Windsor (born December 19, 1942) is a former tight end in the National Football League (NFL).

Windsor played a total of nine seasons in the NFL, five with the San Francisco 49ers and four with the New England Patriots. He had two productive seasons as a starter with the 49ers in 1969 and 1970, starting all 14 games both seasons and recording 49 receptions (career high) and 597 yards in 1969 and 31 and 363 in 1970. With the Patriots, he became a starter in 1972, started all 14 games and had 33 receptions for 383 yards.

Windsor is best known for a winning touchdown play while with the Patriots that he made in a regular season game in 1974 against the Minnesota Vikings. Both teams had 5-1 records going into the game. The Vikings had been to Super Bowl VIII the season before, while the upstart Patriots were coming off seven consecutive losing seasons and off to their best start since 1966. The Patriots won the game 17–14, and Windsor scored the winning touchdown with no time left on the clock by taking a short pass from Jim Plunkett and breaking several tackles before dragging a tackler into the Vikings end zone who had a hold of his left leg. Windsor severely injured his left knee on the play and was out for the season. He never was the same player after that and played only one more season with the Patriots before retiring.

== NFL career statistics ==
Legend
	Led the league
**Bold**	Career high

=== Regular season ===
Year	Team	Games		Receiving				
Year	Team	GP	GS	Rec	Yds	Avg	Lng	TD
1967	SFO	14	6	21	254	12.1	55	2
1968	SFO	14	0	8	146	**18.3**	**62**	2
1969	SFO	14	14	**49**	**597**	12.2	32	2
1970	SFO	14	14	31	363	11.7	35	2
1971	SFO	13	0	2	32	16.0	30	0
1972	NWE	14	14	33	383	11.6	24	1
1973	NWE	13	9	23	348	15.1	36	**4**
1974	NWE	7	7	12	127	10.6	20	1
1975	NWE	14	3	6	57	9.5	12	0
Career		117	67	185	2,307	12.5	62	14

=== Playoffs ===
Year	Team	Games		Receiving				
Year	Team	GP	GS	Rec	Yds	Avg	Lng	TD
1970	SFO	2	2	**3**	**70**	**23.3**	**29**	0
1971	SFO	2	0	1	2	2.0	2	**1**
Career		4	2	4	72	18.0	29	1
