= 1971 Pro Bowl =

National Football League all-star game

1971 NFL Pro Bowl
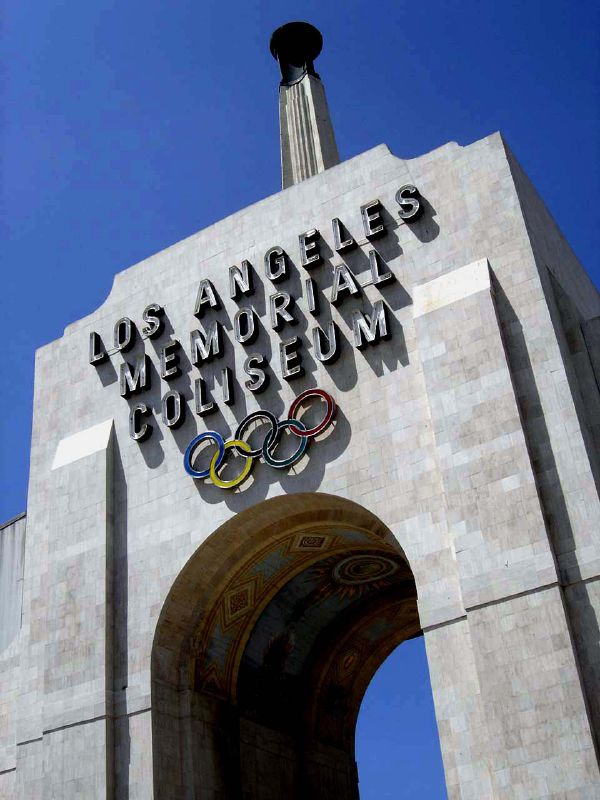
- The front of the L.A. Memorial Coliseum
AFC	NFC
6	27
Head coach: John Madden (Oakland Raiders)	Head coach: Dick Nolan (San Francisco 49ers)
	1	2	3	4	Total
AFC	0	3	3	0	6
NFC	0	3	10	14	27
- Date: January 24, 1971
- Stadium: Los Angeles Memorial Coliseum; Los Angeles, California
- Co-MVPs: Fred Carr (Green Bay Packers, LB), Mel Renfro (Dallas Cowboys, CB)
- Favorite: NFC
- Referee: Fred Silva
- Attendance: 48,222

TV in the United States
- Network: CBS
- Announcers: Jack Whitaker, Frank Gifford, Bruce Roberts

The 1971 Pro Bowl was the NFL's 21st annual all-star game which featured the outstanding performers from the 1970 season. The game was played on January 24, 1971, at Los Angeles Memorial Coliseum in Los Angeles, California. The final score was NFC 27, AFC 6.

Defensive back Mel Renfro of the Dallas Cowboys was named the game's offensive Most Valuable Player (MVP) for his two punt return touchdowns (82 and 56 yards) on special teams, and linebacker Fred Carr of the Green Bay Packers was selected as the defensive MVP.

Attendance at the game was 48,222. John Madden of the Oakland Raiders coached the AFC, while the NFC was led by the San Francisco 49ers' Dick Nolan. The referee for the contest was Fred Silva.

Both teams had 41 players; the winners earned $2,000 each and losers received $1,500. The game was played a week after Super Bowl V, held in Miami.

This was the first Pro Bowl to feature the AFC vs. the NFC format, which was used through 2013, then resumed in 2017.
