= Cas Banaszek =

American football player (1946–2019)

No. 79
- Position: Offensive tackle

Personal information
- Born: October 24, 1945; Chicago, Illinois, U.S.
- Died: December 4, 2019 (aged 74)
- Listed height: 6 ft 3 in (1.91 m)
- Listed weight: 254 lb (115 kg)

Career information
- High school: DePaul College Prep (Chicago)
- College: Northwestern (1963–1966)
- NFL draft: 1967: 1st round, 11th overall pick

Career history
- San Francisco 49ers (1968–1977)

Awards and highlights
- 2× Second-team All-American (1965, 1966); 2× Second-team All-Big Ten (1965, 1966)

Career NFL statistics
- Games played: 120
- Games started: 112
- Fumble recoveries: 2
- Stats at Pro Football Reference

Casimir Joseph Banaszek Jr. (October 24, 1945 – December 4, 2019) was an American professional football player who was an offensive lineman for 10 seasons (1968 to 1977) with the San Francisco 49ers. He was named All-National Football Conference in 1970 and 1971. The 49ers' 1970 offensive line, known as "The Protectors", set an NFL record at the time by only allowing eight quarterback sacks in a 14-game season; and allowed only 11 the following year. Banaszek played his college football for the Northwestern Wildcats as a tight end, where he set the school record for most career pass receptions. In 2007, he was named to the Chicagoland Sports Hall of Fame.

== Early life ==
Banaszek was born on October 24, 1945, in Chicago, to Casimir and Dorothy Banaszek. He attended Gordon Tech High School (later DePaul College Prep), part of the Chicago Catholic League in sports. He played quarterback and end on Gordon Tech's football team. Banaszek was an All-Catholic League end in 1961, but coach Warren Jones moved him to quarterback in 1962. As a 6 ft 3 in (1.91 m) 210 lb (95.3 kg) senior in 1962, the Chicago Tribune named Banaszek to its Prep Football All-Star Team at quarterback. He was also named an All-State end by the Champaign News-Gazette in 1962.

Banaszek also played forward and center on Gordon Tech's basketball team during his high school career. The Chicago Tribune named Banaszek to its Prep Basketball All-Star Team in both his junior (1961–62) and senior (1962–63) seasons. He was co-captain of the basketball team as a senior. Gordon Tech's basketball team was conference champion in the 1961–62 season.

== College career ==
Banaszek attended Northwestern University, where he obtained a teaching degree. He played on the football team at Northwestern. As a 225 lb (102.1 kg) sophomore in 1964, he played tight end on offense, being considered both a good receiver and blocker. In 1964, he led the team in receptions (27) and receiving yards (317).

As a junior in 1965, Banaszek again led Northwestern as a receiver, with 30 receptions and 333 receiving yards. The Associated Press (AP) selected him second-team All-Big Ten that year. In 1966, he was second on the team in receptions (31) and receiving yards (272), with two touchdown receptions. During his senior season, he broke the Northwestern career reception record (69), ending with 93 receptions over his three years in setting the new record. The AP gave him an honorable mention for All-Big Ten in 1966.

Banaszek was chosen to play in the 1966 Mahi Shrine North-South College All-Star Game, in Miami's Orange Bowl; not only for his pass receiving, but because his ability as a blocker had been a key factor in Northwestern's rushing attack. He was also selected to play for the college all-stars against the Green Bay Packers in the 1967 Chicago Charities College All-Star Game.

== Professional career ==
The San Francisco 49ers selected Banaszek in the first round of the 1967 NFL/AFL draft, 11th overall. In his first 49ers training camp, it was anticipated Banaszek would be a tight end or linebacker. It was reported in early September 1967, that the 49ers drafted Banaszek with the intention of using him as a linebacker, to eventually replace veteran 49ers' linebacker Matt Hazeltine. However, Banaszek was on the 49ers' taxi squad in 1967, and did not play for the 49ers that season. He was considered a rookie in 1968.

The 49ers moved Banaszek from tight end to offensive tackle during their 1968 training camp. By the end of training camp, he was the 49ers starting right offensive tackle, and was the team's starting right tackle in the first game of the season against the Baltimore Colts. Banaszek started all 14 games at right tackle that season, as did each of his offensive linemates: Len Rohde (left tackle), Elmer Collett (left guard), Bruce Bosely (center) and Howard Mudd (right guard). The 49ers had the second most passing yards in the NFL that season and gave up the fifth fewest quarterback sacks. Banaszek was third in voting for AP offensive Rookie of the Year.

Banaszek remained the 49ers' starting right offensive tackle from 1969 into the 1976 season. From 1969 to 1972 he missed only three starts for the 49ers. In 1970, the Associated Press named him first-team All-National Football Conference (NFC), and United Press International (UPI) named him second-team All-NFC. In 1971, Pro Football Weekly named Banaszek first-team All-NFC and UPI named him second-team All-NFC.

In 1970, the 49ers led the NFL in allowing the fewest quarterback sacks, allowing only eight sacks in 14 games. In 1971, the 49ers again led the NFL in fewest sacks, allowing only 11 sacks in 14 games. The eight sacks was an NFL record at the time (broken by the 1988 Miami Dolphins with seven). During that span of allowing less than 20 sacks over 28 games in two consecutive seasons, the 49ers offensive line group was known as "The Protectors". The Protectors consisted of Banaszek at right tackle, Woody Peoples at right guard, Forrest Blue at center, Randy Beisler at left guard and Rohde at left tackle.

The quarterback they protected, John Brodie, was selected as the NFL's Most Valuable Player in 1970. Behind "The Protectors" line, Brodie led the NFL in completed passes, passing yards, passing touchdowns and passer rating. Among quarterbacks starting all 14 games that season, Brodie was sacked eight times for a loss of 67 yards; with the next lowest being the Oakland Raiders' Daryle Lamonica, sacked 15 times for 127 yards. By comparison to "The Protectors", the NFL's worst offenses in protecting their starting quarterbacks were the San Diego Chargers, with quarterback John Hadl being sacked 42 times in 12 games, and the Buffalo Bills' Dennis Shaw losing 387 yards on 41 sacks in 12 games that season.

The 49ers were first in the NFC's West Division in 1970, with a 10–3–1 record, and reached the NFC championship game; losing 17–10 to the Dallas Cowboys. In 1971, the 49ers again won the NFC West Division (9–5), and again lost to the Cowboys in the NFC championship game (14–3). In 1972, they won the division for a third consecutive season (8–5–1), and lost to the Cowboys in the divisional round of the playoffs, 30–28.

In 1973, Banaszek was injured in the ninth game of the season against the Washington Redskins, and did not start in the final five games that season. He started all 14 games in both 1974 and 1975. Banaszek suffered a dislocated elbow in the 49ers' 1976 training camp, and his play was limited during the preseason by injuries. He opened the regular season playing with a brace on his dislocated elbow. He started only eight games that season. Although Banaszek was healthy enough to play, coach Monte Clark decided to replace the 31-year old Banaszek with the 24-year old Keith Fahnhorst at starting right tackle, beginning in the season's ninth game. Fahnhorst had played most of the preceding game at right tackle, and started there for the remainder of the season. The 49ers had projected Fahnhorst as a starter, and wanted to see how he would perform.

In 1977, Banaszek appeared in only six games, mostly on special teams, without starting any games at tackle. During the ninth game of the season, he suffered a broken leg against the New Orleans Saints on a punting play. The 49ers were behind at the time. The team became infuriated because they believed Banaszek was hurt by a "cheap shot" during that play, and were determined to win the game for Banaszek. Offensive lineman Steve Lawson would say "Cas Banaszek" in the huddle after ever offensive play after the injury. The 49ers won the game, 10–7 in overtime. This was the final game of Banaszek's NFL career, as he was placed on injured reserved.

Over his 10-year NFL career with the 49ers, the 6 ft 3 in (1.91 m) 254 lb (115 kg) Banaszek started 112 games at right tackle.

== Coaching career ==
Banaszek was the University of California Golden Bears' offensive line coach for two seasons. In 1981, the 49ers hired Banaszek as an assistant offensive line coach, working with the tight ends and on run blocking. That team won the franchise's first Super Bowl.

== Personal life and death ==
Banaszek worked at an electronics manufacturing firm in Mountain View, California after retiring from football. He moved to Petaluma, California in 2001. He volunteered as a physical education teacher at his grandchildren's elementary school, Meadow, where he became a respected and loved figure, known as "Coach B" by the children and staff. In one year-end survey of the school's children asking what they loved about Meadow, many of the children simply wrote, "Coach B".

Banaszek was inducted into the Chicagoland Sports Hall of Fame in 2007.

He died of cancer on December 4, 2019. He was survived by Diann Banaszek, his wife of 52 years, two children and four grandchildren. He was predeceased by a grandchild, Casimir Banaszek IV, known as C.J. There was a memorial garden to C.J. at Meadow elementary, where Banaszek would spend hours sitting and talking with the school's teachers.
