= John Thomas (American football, born 1935) =

American football player (born 1935)

- Thomas in 1961

No. 78
- Positions: Guard, tackle, linebacker

Personal information
- Born: January 25, 1935 (age 91); Tyler, Texas, U.S.
- Listed height: 6 ft 4 in (1.93 m)
- Listed weight: 246 lb (112 kg)

Career information
- High school: El Cerrito (El Cerrito, California)
- College: Pacific
- NFL draft: 1957: 23rd round, 272nd overall pick

Career history
- San Francisco 49ers (1958–1967)

Awards and highlights
- First-team All-Pro (1966); Pro Bowl (1966)

Career NFL statistics
- Games played: 122
- Games Started: 112
- Fumble recoveries: 7
- Stats at Pro Football Reference

John Thomas (born January 25, 1935) is an American former professional football player who was a tackle for 10 seasons with the San Francisco 49ers of the National Football League (NFL).

== Biography ==
John Thomas was born January 25, 1935, in Tyler, Texas.

He attended the College of the Pacific, a private college in Stockton, California affiliated with the United Methodist Church. At Pacific he played football and basketball, particularly excelling in the latter sport, captaining the team for two years a row and earning All-Pacific Coast status.

Publicity photo of Thomas from 1960.

Thomas' basketball skills were good enough to earn a try out with the St. Louis Hawks of the National Basketball Association (NBA). While he did not make the Hawks team, Thomas would continue to play basketball as a hobby and fitness activity throughout his professional football career.

Thomas was selected as an end in the 23rd round of the 1957 NFL draft by the San Francisco 49ers, who made him the 272nd player taken overall. The tepid estimation of his receiving potential made by player personnel men around the league proved reasonably founded, unfortunately, and the 215-pound receiver failed the make the 49ers roster and was unconditionally released.

Not to be deterred, Thomas packed on 30 pounds of muscle and returned as a free agent to 49ers training camp ahead of the 1958 season, this time in an effort to land a spot as an offensive tackle. The second effort proved a charm, and Thomas won a place on the team's 35-man roster. He would appear in 12 games during that year, starting at left tackle in 7 of those contests.

During the off-season, Thomas worked for the probation department of Alameda County, California.
