= Preston Riley =

American football player (born 1947)

No. 85, 84
- Position: Wide receiver

Personal information
- Born: October 30, 1947 (age 79); Vicksburg, Mississippi, U.S.
- Listed height: 6 ft 0 in (1.83 m)
- Listed weight: 180 lb (82 kg)

Career information
- High school: Culkin Academy (Vicksburg)
- College: Memphis
- NFL draft: 1970: 9th round, 217th overall pick

Career history
- San Francisco 49ers (1970–1972); New Orleans Saints (1973)

Career NFL statistics
- Receptions: 21
- Receiving yards: 331
- Receiving TDs: 1
- Stats at Pro Football Reference

Preston Riley (born October 30, 1947) is an American former professional football player who was a wide receiver in the National Football League (NFL). He played college football for the Memphis Tigers. Riley played in the NFL for the San Francisco 49ers from 1970 to 1972 and for the New Orleans Saints in 1973. He is infamous for fumbling the onside kick in the 1972 playoff game against the Dallas Cowboys that allowed Dallas to complete a miraculous comeback and prevent San Francisco from going to their first Super Bowl.
