= Clark Miller =

American football player (1938–2008)

No. 74, 82, 78
- Position: Defensive end

Personal information
- Born: August 11, 1938; Oakland, California, U.S.
- Died: November 5, 2008 (aged 70); Paso Robles, California, U.S.
- Listed height: 6 ft 5 in (1.96 m)
- Listed weight: 245 lb (111 kg)

Career information
- High school: Oakland (CA)
- College: Utah State
- NFL draft: 1961: 5th round, 58th overall pick
- AFL draft: 1961: 14th round, 106th overall pick

Career history
- San Francisco 49ers (1962–1968); New York Giants (1969)*; Washington Redskins (1969); Los Angeles Rams (1970)
- * Offseason or practice squad member only

Career NFL statistics
- Fumble recoveries: 5
- Interceptions: 1
- Sacks: 32.5
- Stats at Pro Football Reference

Franklin Clark Miller (August 11, 1938 – November 5, 2008) was an American professional football player in the National Football League (NFL) who played defensive end for nine seasons for the San Francisco 49ers, the Washington Redskins, and the Los Angeles Rams. He played college football at Utah State University and was drafted in the fifth round of the 1961 NFL draft. Miller was also selected in the fourteenth round of the 1961 AFL draft by the Oakland Raiders.

Clark Miller died of a heart attack on November 5, 2008, at a hospital in Paso Robles, California a week after he was injured and hospitalized following a horse riding accident.
