= Kay McFarland (American football) =

American football player (1938–2022)

No. 26
- Position: Wide receiver

Personal information
- Born: April 10, 1938; Quincy, Illinois, U.S.
- Died: May 26, 2022 (aged 84); Centennial, Colorado, U.S.
- Listed height: 6 ft 2 in (1.88 m)
- Listed weight: 186 lb (84 kg)

Career information
- High school: Englewood (Englewood, Colorado)
- College: Colorado State
- NFL draft: 1961: 18th round, 248th overall pick

Career history
- San Francisco 49ers (1962–1968)

Career NFL statistics
- Receptions: 45
- Receiving yards: 682
- Touchdowns: 4
- Stats at Pro Football Reference

Kay McFarland (April 10, 1938 – May 26, 2022) was an American professional football wide receiver who played in the National Football League (NFL).

== Early life ==
McFarland was born in Quincy, Illinois and grew up in Englewood, Colorado, where he attended Englewood High School. He was named All-State in both basketball and football.

== College career ==
McFarland attended Colorado State University to play basketball and join the track team as a long-jumper. He lettered in each sport three times and was part of the Rams 1961 Skyline Conference championship team in basketball. After being drafted by the San Francisco 49ers, McFarland opted to use his final season of eligibility to join the football team and play while finishing his undergraduate degree. He led the Rams in receiving in 1961 with 18 catches for 196 yards and two touchdowns.

== Professional career ==
McFarland was selected in the 18th round of the 1961 NFL draft by the San Francisco 49ers despite not having played football yet in college. He signed with the team in 1962 after playing a season of football at Colorado State. McFarland was cut midway through his rookie season but was re-signed by the 49ers on December 11, 1962. McFarland missed the entire 1967 season due to a dislocated elbow. McFarland was used primarily as a blocking end in the NFL. He finished his professional career with 45 receptions for 682 yards and four touchdowns in 63 games played. McFarland retired from football after the 1968 season at the age of 30.
