= Roland Lakes =

American football player (1939–2012)

No. 60, 76
- Positions: Defensive tackle, defensive end, offensive tackle

Personal information
- Born: December 25, 1939; Vicksburg, Mississippi, U.S.
- Died: March 5, 2012 (aged 72); Santa Clara, California, U.S.
- Listed height: 6 ft 4 in (1.93 m)
- Listed weight: 279 lb (127 kg)

Career information
- High school: Parsons (Parsons, Kansas)
- College: Wichita State
- NFL draft: 1961: 2nd round, 24th overall pick
- AFL draft: 1961: 9th round, 66th overall pick

Career history
- San Francisco 49ers (1961–1970); New York Giants (1971)

Career NFL statistics
- Fumble recoveries: 10
- Touchdowns: 1
- Sacks: 46.5
- Stats at Pro Football Reference

Roland Hayes Lakes (December 25, 1939 – March 5, 2012) was an American football defensive lineman. He played defensive tackle at University of Wichita, and then for eleven seasons in the National Football League (NFL) (San Francisco 49ers 1961–1970, and New York Giants 1971).
