= Al Randolph =

American football player (born 1944)

No. 27, 45, 34, 24
- Position: Safety

Personal information
- Born: July 8, 1944 (age 82); East St. Louis, Illinois, U.S.
- Listed height: 6 ft 2 in (1.88 m)
- Listed weight: 205 lb (93 kg)

Career information
- High school: East St. Louis
- College: Iowa
- NFL draft: 1966: 3rd round, 37th overall pick

Career history
- San Francisco 49ers (1966–1970); Green Bay Packers (1971); Cincinnati Bengals (1972); Detroit Lions (1972); Minnesota Vikings (1973); San Francisco 49ers (1974); Buffalo Bills (1974)

Career NFL statistics
- Interceptions: 11
- Fumble recoveries: 9
- Touchdowns: 1
- Stats at Pro Football Reference

Alvin Chester Randolph (born July 8, 1944) is an American former professional football safety in the National Football League (NFL). He was selected by the San Francisco 49ers in the third round of the 1966 NFL draft. He also played for the Green Bay Packers, Cincinnati Bengals, Detroit Lions, Minnesota Vikings, and Buffalo Bills. Randolph played college football at the University of Iowa.
