= Stan Hindman =

American football player (1944–2020)

No. 80, 74
- Positions: Defensive tackle, Defensive end

Personal information
- Born: March 1, 1944; Newton, Mississippi, U.S.
- Died: July 15, 2020 (aged 76); Oakland, California, U.S.
- Listed height: 6 ft 3 in (1.91 m)
- Listed weight: 235 lb (107 kg)

Career information
- High school: Newton (MS)
- College: Ole Miss (1962-1965)
- NFL draft: 1966: 1st round, 11th overall pick
- AFL draft: 1966: 2nd round, 12th overall pick

Career history
- San Francisco 49ers (1966–1974)

Awards and highlights
- Second-team All-American (1965); Third-team All-American (1964); 2× First-team All-SEC (1963, 1965); Second-team All-SEC (1964)

Career NFL statistics
- Interceptions: 1
- Fumble recoveries: 2
- Sacks: 26
- Stats at Pro Football Reference

Stanley Chatham Hindman (March 1, 1944 – July 15, 2020) was an American professional football defensive lineman in the National Football League (NFL) for seven seasons for the San Francisco 49ers.

Hindman went on to study architecture at UCLA and graduated with a professional M.Arch. degree in 1981. He died on July 15, 2020.
