= Howard Mudd =

American football player and coach (1942–2020)

No. 68
- Position: Guard

Personal information
- Born: February 10, 1942; Midland, Michigan, U.S.
- Died: August 12, 2020 (aged 78); Seattle, Washington, U.S.
- Listed height: 6 ft 2 in (1.88 m)
- Listed weight: 254 lb (115 kg)

Career information
- High school: Midland
- College: Michigan State (1959-1960); Hillsdale (1962-1963)
- NFL draft: 1964: 9th round, 113th overall pick

Career history

Playing
- San Francisco 49ers (1964–1969); Chicago Bears (1969–1970)

Coaching
- California (1972–1973) Offensive line coach; San Diego Chargers (1974–1976) Offensive line coach; San Francisco 49ers (1977) Offensive line coach; Seattle Seahawks (1978–1982) Offensive line coach; Cleveland Browns (1983–1988) Offensive line coach; Kansas City Chiefs (1989–1992) Offensive line coach; Seattle Seahawks (1993–1997) Offensive line coach; Indianapolis Colts (1998–2009) Offensive line coach; Philadelphia Eagles (2011–2012) Offensive line coach; Indianapolis Colts (2019) Senior offensive assistant

Awards and highlights
- As player: 2× All-Pro (1967, 1968); 3× Pro Bowl (1966–1968); NFL 1960s All-Decade Team; As coach: Super Bowl champion (XLI)

Career NFL statistics
- Games played: 93
- Games started: 56
- Fumble recoveries: 1
- Stats at Pro Football Reference

Howard Edward Mudd (February 10, 1942 – August 12, 2020) was an American professional football offensive lineman and coach. He retired in 1971 due to a knee injury, and began his coaching career at California the following year. From 1998 to 2009, he was the offensive line coach for the Indianapolis Colts in the National Football League (NFL), with whom he won Super Bowl XLI.

== Early life ==
Mudd was born on February 10, 1942, in Midland, Michigan. He attended Central Intermediate School, where he played football and baseball, and Midland High School, where he was captain of the football team under coach Bob Stoppert. He was an outstanding offensive lineman on the Midland High team that won the 1957 Michigan state championship. First ranked Midland defeated second ranked Bay City Central 20–12, before 10,000 people at Bay City's stadium. The Midland team was inducted into the Midland County Hall of Fame in 1995.

== College ==
Mudd went on to play college football at Michigan State and Hillsdale College. While at Michigan State he joined the Delta Tau Delta International Fraternity. Mudd played football for Hillsdale College from 1960 to 1963, where he was a starting guard, played some tackle, and was a team captain; winning an NAIA All-American selection, and two Associated Press (AP) All-State awards. His play at the school led to his induction into the NAIA Hall of Fame. He received a Hillsdale alumni award in 2007.

== NFL player ==
Mudd was selected 113th overall by the San Francisco 49ers in the ninth round of the 1964 NFL draft. The 49ers discovered Mudd when they went to scout a different player during a college game. The 49ers later named Mudd to their All-Golden Era Team. In one 49ers game against the Baltimore Colts, the defensive lineman playing opposite Mudd is said to have used a plastic shield on his hand to pound Mudd throughout the game, until Mudd became disoriented.

Mudd played seven seasons in the National Football League (NFL), with the 49ers from 1964 to 1969, and the Chicago Bears from 1969 to 1970. Mudd was a three-time Pro Bowl starter in 1966, 1967, and 1968; an All-Pro twice; and a member of the NFL All-Decade Team for the 1960s as a guard (along with Gene Hickerson and Jerry Kramer). His career was shortened by injuries. His last game was against the Green Bay Packers in November 1970, where he re-injured his knee and the Bears moved him from the roster to make room for another guard, Jim Cadile.

== Coaching career ==
Mudd would go on to be an offensive line coach for 38 years.

Mudd pursued a coaching career following his retirement as an NFL player. He spent two years as an assistant coach at California, before moving to the NFL, and coaching for the San Diego Chargers (1974–1976), San Francisco 49ers (1977), Seattle Seahawks (1978–1982, 1993–1997), Cleveland Browns (1983–1988) and Kansas City Chiefs (1989–1992) between 1974 and 1997.

He then joined the Indianapolis Colts as an offensive line coach, where he coached from 1998 to 2009. During his 12 years in Indianapolis, the Colts allowed the fewest sacks in the NFL, with 218 sacks in 182 games. From 1998 to 2009, the offensive line was either first or tied for first in fewest sacks allowed five times, and was never lower than tenth in fewest sacks allowed. This is especially impressive when the high number of passing plays the Colts attempted during that time period was taken into account. Peyton Manning played for the Colts for 11 of those 12 years, and credits much of his success to the protection he received from Mudd's front line.

On May 6, 2009, ESPN reported that Mudd had filed his retirement papers due to a change in the NFL's pension program. On May 20, 2009, Mudd returned to the team as the senior offensive line coach. Mudd planned to retire for good following the Colts' game against the New Orleans Saints in Super Bowl XLIV.

In May 2010, Mudd and New Orleans Saints offensive line coach Aaron Kromer were together for a coaching clinic in Cincinnati, at which time Kromer approached Mudd about serving as a temporary consultant with the Saints. Mudd first advised the Saints during the 2010 offseason, then returned for the opening of training camp. In reference to his association with the Saints, Mudd said "He (Kromer) asked me to come down and spend a little time, and I said, 'OK'. I'll only be here a couple of days. That's it."

Mudd was named the offensive line coach for the Philadelphia Eagles, after being talked out of retirement by then Eagles head coach Andy Reid, on February 2, 2011. In Mudd's first season with the Eagles, they allowed 17 fewer sacks than they had the previous season, and the least number of sacks (32) since 2008. The line helped LeSean McCoy lead the NFL in total touchdowns (20), along with 1,309 rushing yards and 1,624 total yards, while being named an All-Pro. Along with All-Pro Jason Peters, Mudd's line also included rookie Jason Kelce, who Mudd made his starting center, and who went on to a stellar career with the Eagles until retiring in 2023. Kelce said of Mudd, "'Howard took a chance on me. He wanted me and he looked at my strengths. Everyone was talking about me being 'undersized' but Howard saw my strengths and he played to them....'" Mudd had urged the Eagles to draft Kelce.

Mudd had hip surgery during the 2011 season, yet continued to coach his players using crutches and a golf cart, known as the Muddmobile. The 71-year-old Mudd retired again at the conclusion of the 2012 season.

On February 7, 2019, the Colts hired Mudd as a senior offensive assistant, but Mudd stepped down from the position on September 6, 2019.

== Impact on football ==
Mudd developed the silent snap count to deal with fan noise affecting communication between the quarterback and offensive line. This was in response to an increase in fan noise at stadiums over the years, and the inability of the offensive tackles to timely block rushing defensive ends, which was increasing the number of quarterback sacks. Under Mudd's guidance, the first successful silent count practitioners were Peyton Manning, Jeff Saturday and Tarik Glenn of the Indianapolis Colts. Eventually, every NFL team has come to use the silent count Mudd created.

Mudd's career emphasized the importance of assistant coaches. In 2014, the Professional Football Writers of America established the Paul “Dr. Z” Zimmerman Award for lifetime achievement as an NFL assistant coach. Mudd, along with Jim Johnson, Fritz Shurmur and Ernie Zampese, were the first to receive the award in 2014.

Mudd authored the book, The View From the O-Line.

== Death ==
Mudd died on August 12, 2020, at the age of 78, of injuries sustained in a motorcycle accident two weeks prior. Colts' owner Jim Irsay tweeted: "Rest in peace, Howard Mudd. Howard was a GREAT player during a shortened career and then became one of the game's all-time greatest offensive line coaches. He contributed to many different teams over 47 years in our league---but he will always be a Colt."
