= Len Rohde =

American football player (1938–2017)

No. 76
- Position: Offensive tackle

Personal information
- Born: April 16, 1938; Palatine, Illinois, U.S.
- Died: May 13, 2017 (aged 79); California, U.S.
- Listed height: 6 ft 4 in (1.93 m)
- Listed weight: 247 lb (112 kg)

Career information
- High school: Palatine
- College: Utah State
- NFL draft: 1960: 5th round, 59th overall pick
- AFL draft: 1960

Career history
- San Francisco 49ers (1960–1974)

Awards and highlights
- Pro Bowl (1970); San Francisco 49ers 10-year club

Career NFL statistics
- Games played: 208
- Games started: 179
- Fumble recoveries: 9
- Stats at Pro Football Reference

Leonard Emil Rohde (/ˈroʊdiː/ ROH-dee; April 16, 1938 – May 13, 2017) was an American professional football player who was an offensive tackle for 15 seasons with the San Francisco 49ers of the National Football League (NFL). He helped the 49ers win the NFC West Division from 1970 to 1972 and he was selected to the Pro Bowl after the 1970 season. Rohde played college football for the Utah State Aggies.

Remembered as one of the most durable players in team history, Rohde played in 208 consecutive games over the course of a 15 year NFL career.

== Early life ==
Len Rohde was born April 16, 1938, in Palatine, Illinois, the son of Emil Rohde, a farmer. He attended Palatine High School, where he played football, basketball, wrestled in the heavyweight division, and participated in the power disciplines of shot put and discus on the school's track and field team.

Rohde was successful in these various high school athletic pursuits, winning the Illinois state high school wrestling championship and setting a new Northwest conference record as a shot putter (12#, 50'0"), in helping to lead the Pirates to a 9th consecutive title as a senior in 1955-56.

== College career ==
Sophomore Len Rohde gained a reputation as a "60-minute Man" for Utah State.

Rohde attended Utah State University. After spending the 1956 season on the freshman team, Rohde was made a member of the varsity in 1957, where the 6'3", 220-pounder immediately challenged for and won a starting spot at right tackle, beating out a junior letterman for the role.

As the NCAA had reinstituted the single platoon system effective with the 1953 season, Rohde played in both an offensive and defensive capacity for the Aggies. Indeed, his agility, strength, and conditioning was such that he frequently played the entire duration of the game without substitution — gaining recognition as a "60-Minute Man".

Despite Utah State's lack of success on the field, Rohde's play even as a sophomore began to attract regional attention for potential All-America consideration.

Rohde continued to be a multi-sport athlete at Utah state, playing football in the fall, wrestling in the winter months, and throwing shot put in the spring. He began his school career majoring in agricultural economics but switched majors and ultimately graduated from Utah State in 1960 with a Bachelor of Science degree in education.

He continued his education while playing professional football, earning a Masters degree from San Diego State University in 1969.

== Professional career ==
Rohde was selected in the fifth round of the 1960 NFL draft by the San Francisco 49ers, who made him the 59th player taken.

He spent the first three years of his NFL career primarily in a reserve role, backing up Hall of Fame offensive right tackle Bob St. Clair. He saw action in all 40 games played by the Niners during these three seasons, posting 11 spot appearances as a starter.

He was moved to a starting role on the other side in 1963 and started as the team's left tackle without missing a single game until his retirement at the end of the 1974 season.

Rohde was an important part of the 49ers offense that led the NFL in points scored and yardage gained in 1965 and 1970. He was recognized by the league by selection to the Pro Bowl after the 1970 season.

Rohde planned on coming back for a 16th NFL season in 1975, but the 37-year old lineman was taken aside by head coach Dick Nolan, who told him, "Len, you've been a fantastic team player your whole life. You could probably do the team another big favor and retire." With his back starting to cause him trouble, Rohde chose to take the hint and filed his retirement paperwork with the league office.

== Life after football ==
Rohde married the former Beverly Ann Boston in December 1961. The pair raised one son.

Beginning in 1976, Rohde launched a second career in the food industry ultimately becoming the owner of six Burger King franchises and holding majority stakes in five Applebee's restaurants, all in the San Francisco Bay area.

== Death and legacy ==
Rohde died on May 13, 2017, aged 79.

Rohde's 208 career games played stands as the most ever by a 49ers lineman. Having appeared in every game of a 15-year NFL career without a single miss, he is regarded as the most durable player in team history.
