= Mel Phillips =

American football player (born 1942)

No. 32
- Position: Safety

Personal information
- Born: January 6, 1942 (age 84); Shelby, North Carolina, U.S.
- Listed height: 6 ft 2 in (1.88 m)
- Listed weight: 198 lb (90 kg)

Career information
- High school: Cleveland (Shelby)
- College: North Carolina A&T (1962–1965)
- NFL draft: 1966: 5th round, 69th overall pick
- AFL draft: 1966: 19th round, 172nd overall pick

Career history

Playing
- San Francisco 49ers (1966–1977)

Coaching
- Detroit Lions (1980–1984) Defensive backs coach; Miami Dolphins (1985–2007) Secondary coach

Career NFL statistics
- Interceptions: 12
- Fumble recoveries: 7
- Touchdowns: 1
- Stats at Pro Football Reference

Melvin Phillips Jr. (born January 6, 1942), is an American former professional football player and coach. He played his entire 12-year NFL career, from 1966 to 1977, with the San Francisco 49ers.

== Early life and education ==
Phillips was born on January 6, 1942, in Shelby, North Carolina, where he went to Cleveland High School. He went to North Carolina A&T State University.

== NFL career ==
Phillips was drafted by the San Francisco 49ers in 1966, as a fifth round draft pick. From 1966 to 1977, he played a total of 147 games for the 49ers.

== Coaching career ==
Phillips coached the defensive backs for the Detroit Lions from 1980 to 1984. He was an assistant coach with the Miami Dolphins from 1985 to 2007. Originally hired by Don Shula, Phillips was retained in order by Jimmy Johnson, Dave Wannstedt, Nick Saban, and Cam Cameron.
