= North Webster High School =

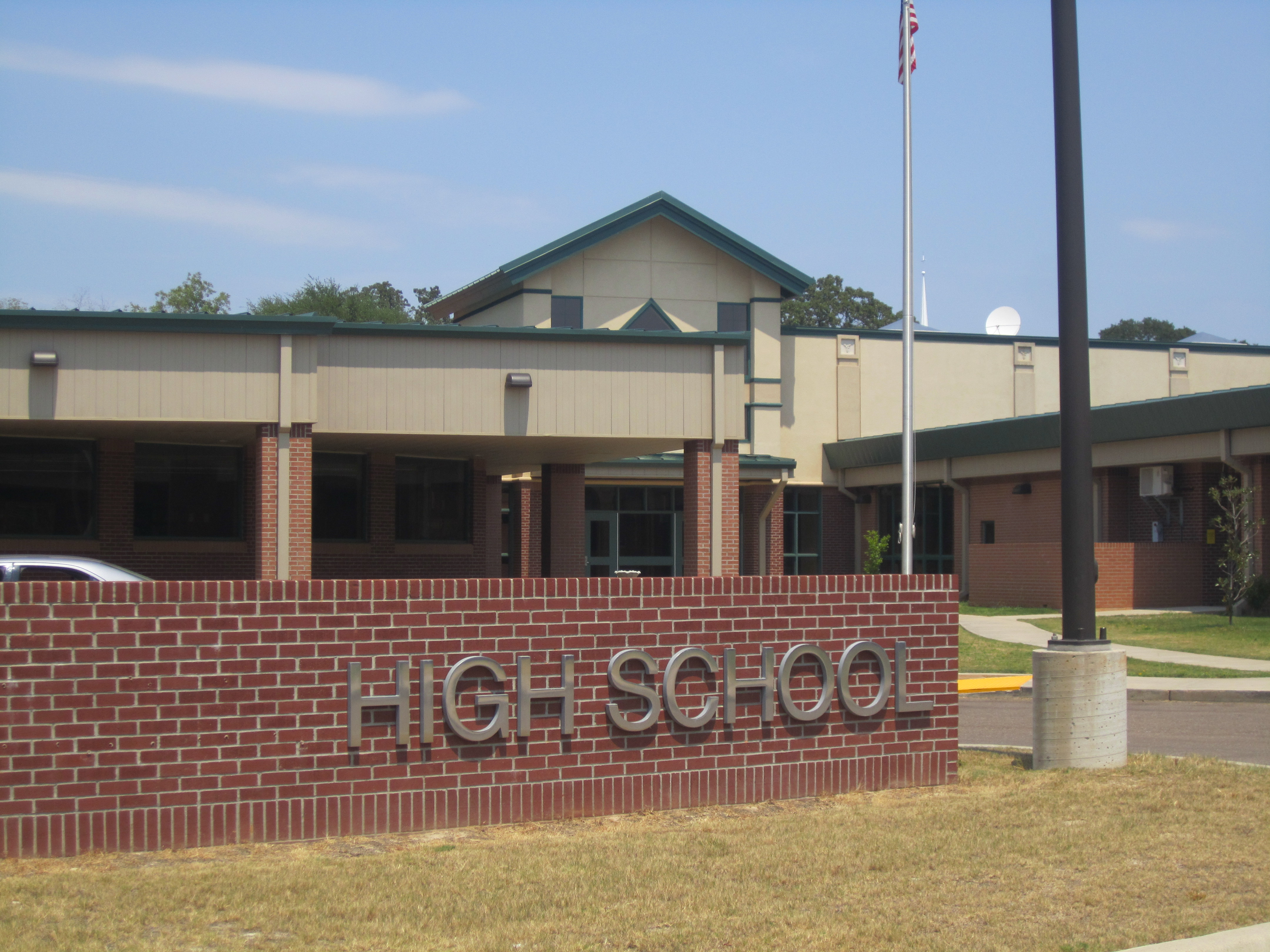

Location
- 101 South Arkansas Street; Springhill, (Webster Parish), Louisiana 71075; United States; 33.003°N 93.4670°W

Information
- Type: Public high school
- School district: Webster Parish School Board
- Principal: Gabe Lyons
- Staff: 29.87 (FTE)
- Enrollment: 512 (2023-2024)
- Student to teacher ratio: 17.14
- Colors: Purple, white, and black
- Mascot: Knights
- Website: nwhs.websterpsb.org

North Webster High School is a co-educational secondary school on Church Street, in Springhill, Louisiana, United States. The catchment area consists of the neighboring areas: Cullen and Western Shongaloo.

== School history ==
In 2011, the parish school board faced a large financial deficit and considered a series of options. Ultimately a plan for consolidation was adopted, in which schools in Sarepta, Cotton Valley, Shongaloo were consolidated into Springhill High School, and the high school was renamed North Webster High School. The new mascot for the school became the "Knights," instead of the Lumberjacks.

== Athletics ==
North Webster High athletics competes in the LHSAA.

=== Championships ===
Springhill Football championships

- (2) State Championships: 1952, 1985

Both championships were Springhill before consolidation

== Notable alumni ==
- Drayton Boucher (attended middle 1920s), former member of the Louisiana State Senate
- Savannah Smith Boucher (Class of 1961), actress
- Sherry Boucher (Class of 1963), former actress
- John David Crow (Class of 1953), American football player and coach and 1957 Heisman Trophy winner at Texas A&M
- Jack Montgomery (Class of 1954), state senator from 1968 to 1972
- Charcandrick West (Class of 2010), American football player for the Kansas City Chiefs
- Devin White (Class of 2016), All-American linebacker at LSU, and Super Bowl LV champion for the Tampa Bay Buccaneers
