= Charcandrick West =

American football player (born 1991)

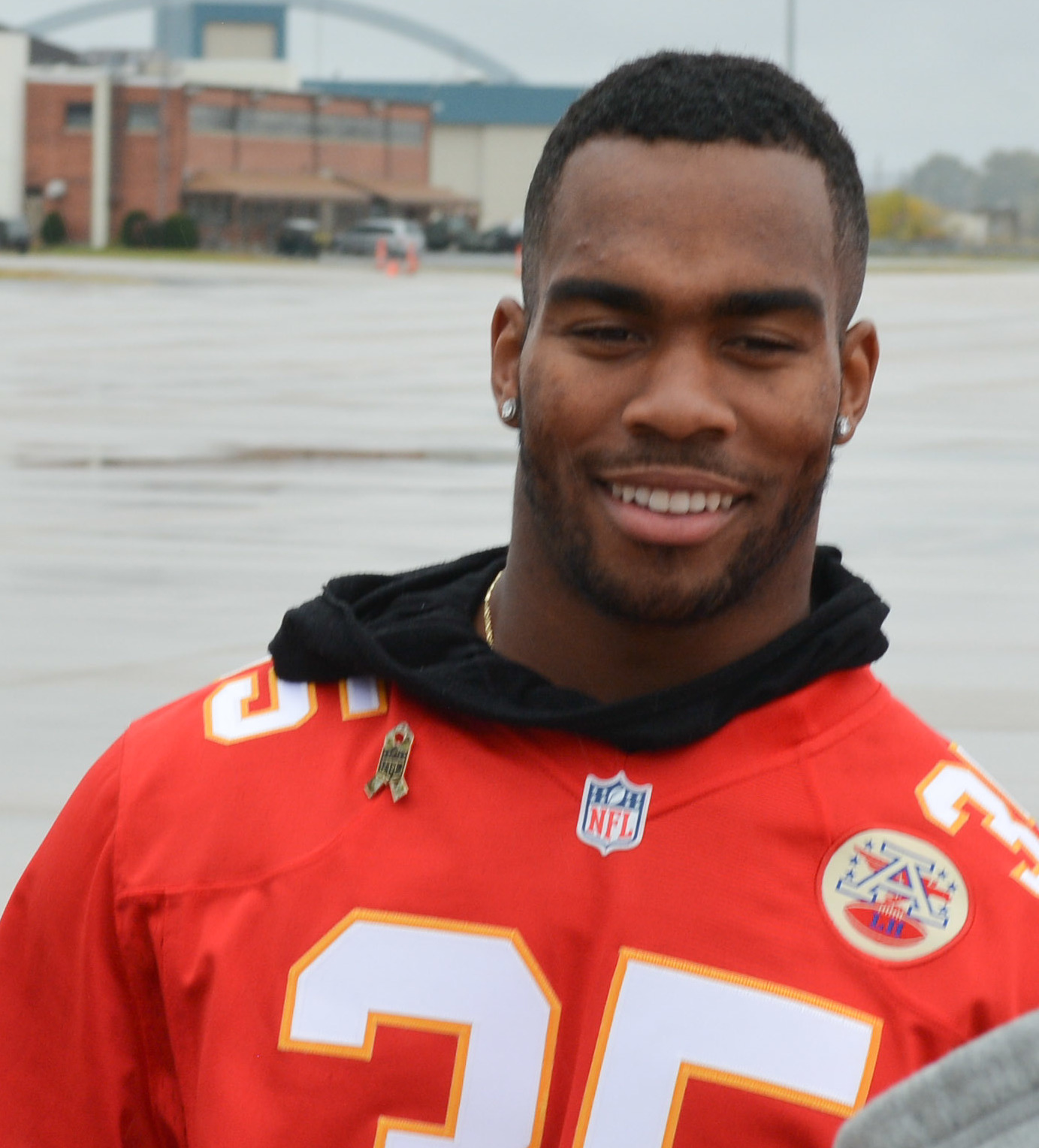
- West with the Kansas City Chiefs in 2015

No. 35, 30, 36
- Position: Running back

Personal information
- Born: June 2, 1991 (age 35); Shreveport, Louisiana, U.S.
- Listed height: 5 ft 10 in (1.78 m)
- Listed weight: 205 lb (93 kg)

Career information
- High school: Springhill (Springhill, Louisiana)
- College: Abilene Christian (2010–2013)
- NFL draft: 2014: undrafted

Career history
- Kansas City Chiefs (2014–2017); New York Jets (2018)*; Kansas City Chiefs (2018); Indianapolis Colts (2019)*
- * Offseason or practice squad member only

Career NFL statistics
- Rushing attempts: 268
- Rushing yards: 998
- Rushing average: 3.7
- Receptions: 77
- Receiving yards: 589
- Total touchdowns: 13
- Stats at Pro Football Reference

Charcandrick West (born June 2, 1991) is an American former professional football player who was a running back for the Kansas City Chiefs of the National Football League (NFL). He played college football for the Abilene Christian Wildcats and signed with the Chiefs as an undrafted free agent in 2014.

== Early life ==
West was born in Shreveport, Louisiana, and later lived in Cullen, Louisiana. He attended high school at Springhill High School in Springhill, Louisiana, where he lettered all four years in football for head coach Joey Pesses. He was named all-state his senior year after earning all-district honors in his sophomore, junior, and senior years. As a senior, he rushed for 1,350 for 16 touchdowns on 89 carries.

In addition to his successful football career, West was a standout sprinter on the track & field team. He still holds the school and district record in the 100-meter dash with a time of 10.34 seconds.

== College career ==
West originally committed to Louisiana Tech University as a cornerback in 2010. He was also recruited by Arkansas, Arkansas State, Louisiana-Monroe, and Nebraska.

West transferred to Abilene Christian University during summer training camp. After transferring, West switched from cornerback to running back.

=== College statistics ===
Season	School	Rushing				Receiving		
Season	School	Rush	Yards	Ave	TD	Rec	Yards	TD
2010	Abilene Christian	47	350	7.4	3	6	130	1
2011	Abilene Christian	57	380	6.7	5	15	200	1
2012	Abilene Christian	98	437	4.5	4	18	234	4
2013	Abilene Christian	145	906	6.2	14	32	443	2
Total	Total	347	2,073	6.0	22	71	1,007	8

== Professional career ==
Pre-draft measurables
Height	Weight	40-yard dash	10-yard split	20-yard split	20-yard shuttle	Three-cone drill	Vertical jump	Broad jump	Bench press
5 ft 10 in (1.78 m)	204 lb (93 kg)	4.46 s	1.51 s	2.51 s	4.40 s	7.08 s	41 in (1.04 m)	10 ft 10 in (3.30 m)	15 reps
All values from Pro Day

=== Kansas City Chiefs (first stint) ===
==== 2014 season ====
West signed with the Kansas City Chiefs as an undrafted free agent on May 12, 2014.

West was released during the final round of cuts during the 2014 season on August 30. The next day, after clearing waivers, the Chiefs signed West to their practice squad. On November 11, he was elevated to the Chiefs' active roster. He appeared in six games in his rookie season, primarily on special teams.

==== 2015 season ====
On October 11, 2015, running back Jamaal Charles tore his ACL and was ruled out for the rest of the season, and West started in his place. His first start was in Week 6 against the Minnesota Vikings. Through Week 11, he had rushed for 373 yards on 98 rushing attempts. He was taken out early from a hamstring injury in the Week 11 game against the San Diego Chargers. Running backs Knile Davis and Spencer Ware backed up West for the remainder of the season. He finished the season with 634 yards on 160 carries, along with four rushing touchdowns. The Chiefs made the playoffs and faced off against the Houston Texans in the Wild Card Round. In the 30–0 victory over the Texans, he had eight rushes for 26 yards. In the Divisional Round against the New England Patriots, he had 61 rushing yards and a rushing touchdown in the 27–20 loss.

==== 2016 season ====
On September 18, 2016, West ran for a season-high 61 yards on six carries in a Week 2 loss to the Houston Texans. On October 30, 2016, West ran for 52 yards and a season-high 14 carries against the Indianapolis Colts. On November 20, 2016, West caught three passes for a season-high 42 yards against the Tampa Bay Buccaneers. On December 8, 2016, West scored his first touchdown of the season in Week 14 against the Oakland Raiders. Overall, he finished the 2016 regular season with 293 rushing yards, one rushing touchdown, 28 receptions, 188 receiving yards, and two receiving touchdowns. The Chiefs made the playoffs and faced off against the Pittsburgh Steelers in the Divisional Round. In the 18–16 loss, he had two receptions for 14 yards.

==== 2017 season ====
With the emergence of Kareem Hunt in the Chiefs' backfield, West's role was in the receiving game for the majority of his output. In the season opener against the defending Super Bowl champion New England Patriots on Thursday Night Football, he had a 21-yard rushing touchdown late in the fourth quarter to put the Chiefs up by two possessions in the 42–27 victory. On October 8, against the Houston Texans, he had two receptions for 12 yards and two receiving touchdowns. Overall, he finished the 2017 season with 72 rushing yards, two rushing touchdowns, 27 receptions, 150 receiving yards, and two receiving touchdowns. The Chiefs made the playoffs and faced off against the Tennessee Titans in the Wild Card Round. In the 22–21 loss, he had two receptions for one yard but added three kick returns for 66 net yards.

West was released by the Chiefs on August 22, 2018.

=== New York Jets ===
On August 24, 2018, West signed with the New York Jets. He was released by the Jets on September 1.

=== Kansas City Chiefs (second stint) ===
On December 3, 2018, West re-signed with the Kansas City Chiefs. He recorded two receptions for 37 receiving yards, one of them for a touchdown, on the 2018 season.

=== Indianapolis Colts ===
West signed with the Indianapolis Colts on August 19, 2019. He was released by the Colts as part of final roster cuts on August 31.

West announced his retirement from professional football on December 3, 2019.

== Personal life ==
West is the older cousin of NFL linebacker Devin White.
