= Benton High School =

Benton High School may refer to:

- Benton Central Junior-Senior High School in Benton County, Indiana
- Benton Consolidated High School in Benton, Illinois
- Benton High School (Arkansas) in Benton, Arkansas
- Benton High School (Louisiana) in Benton, Louisiana
- Benton High School (Missouri) in Saint Joseph, Missouri
- Benton High School (Wisconsin) in Benton, Wisconsin
- Benton High School (Mississippi) in Yazoo County, Mississippi
