= Charlie Krueger =

American football player (1937–2021)

- Krueger in 1961

No. 70
- Positions: Defensive tackle, defensive end

Personal information
- Born: January 28, 1937; Caldwell, Texas, U.S.
- Died: February 5, 2021 (aged 84); Clayton, California, U.S.
- Listed height: 6 ft 4 in (1.93 m)
- Listed weight: 256 lb (116 kg)

Career information
- High school: Caldwell
- College: Texas A&M (1954–1957)
- NFL draft: 1958: 1st round, 8th overall pick

Career history
- San Francisco 49ers (1959–1973)

Awards and highlights
- 2× Second-team All-Pro (1960, 1965); 2× Pro Bowl (1960, 1964); San Francisco 49ers Hall of Fame; San Francisco 49ers No. 70 retired; 2× First-team All-American (1956, 1957); 2× First-team All-SWC (1956, 1957); Texas Sports Hall of Fame; NFF Hall of Fame

Career NFL statistics
- Safeties: 3
- Fumble recoveries: 7
- Interceptions: 1
- Total touchdowns: 1
- Stats at Pro Football Reference
- College Football Hall of Fame

Charles Andrew Krueger (January 28, 1937 – February 5, 2021) was an American professional football player who was a defensive tackle for 15 seasons in the National Football League (NFL), all with the San Francisco 49ers. He played college football at Texas A&M, where he was a two-time All-American. He is a member of several halls of fame, including the Texas A&M Athletics Hall of Fame, College Football Hall of Fame, San Francisco 49ers Hall of Fame, National Football Foundation Hall of Fame, and the Texas Sports Hall of Fame.

== Early life ==
Krueger was born on January 28, 1937, and raised in Caldwell, Texas, the second oldest of eight children. His family was poor; all the boys helped out in their father's mattress factory business. By the time Charlie was 11 he could stuff and stitch a neat ticking. When he was 12, Kruger started playing football at halfback, but he soon grew in size to be more fit as a lineman. Starting at age 13, he pushed steel on Santa Fe track gangs and on oil rigs. As a sophomore at Caldwell High School, he weighed 190 pounds and was 6 ft 2 in (1.88 m). His ten-year younger brother, Rolf Krueger, also played college football at Texas A&M and in the NFL.

== College career ==
He received college football offers from Texas A&M (the Aggies), Rice, and Texas, and after being convinced by new Aggies head coach Bear Bryant, decided to play for Texas A&M.

Krueger played under head coach Bear Bryant, who Krueger considered his most important football influence. Krueger's teammates included 1957 Heisman Trophy winner John David Crow, future NFL All-Pro linebacker and coach Jack Pardee, and future Aggie coach Gene Stallings.

Krueger received All-Southwest Conference (SWC) and All-American honors for the 1956 and 1957 seasons. He was part of the 1956 Aggies team that won the SWC championship. After his senior season, he played as captain of the 1958 College All-Star Team, which defeated the Detroit Lions 35–19; and played extremely well in the game.

Krueger was inducted into the Texas A&M Athletics Hall of Fame in 1972 and the College Football Hall of Fame in 1983. He was also included in the SWC 50-year anniversary all-time team which covered the 1919–68 seasons.

== Professional career ==
Krueger was selected ninth overall in the first round of the 1958 NFL draft by the San Francisco 49ers. He played defensive tackle for the team until his retirement in 1973. After sitting out his rookie year due to injury, he started 193 of the 198 games in which he appeared. He was selected to the Associated Press All-Pro second-team in 1960 and 1965, and the UPI All-Pro honorable mention team in 1966. He was selected to the Pro Bowl in 1960 and 1964. From 1970 to 1972, his teams won three consecutive NFC West titles.

Pro Bowl Los Angeles Rams' guard Joe Scibelli, who faced off against Krueger tens of times over 13 years, thought Krueger would have gained more acclaim but for Krueger's quiet nature. He observed the most Krueger ever said to him was "'Good game, Joe'" after a game ended. In the 1971 championship game between the Dallas Cowboys and 49ers, coach Tom Landry ran 90% of the Cowboys' running plays away from Krueger. Landry said, "'No one is able to gain running at Charlie Krueger ... and we were not about to experiment.'"

Paul Wiggin, a Krueger line coach and former Cleveland Browns player said the Browns would use film of Krueger to study proper defensive tackle technique. He was regularly double and tripled-teamed, freeing up his linemates to make plays.

Krueger wore number 70 and his number was retired by the 49ers. Nicknamed the "Textbook Tackle", his defensive teammates included Pro Football Hall of Fame members Dave Wilcox at linebacker and Jimmy Johnson at cornerback. He was one of the last linemen in the NFL to wear a two-bar "quarterback" facemask. Toward the end of his career, veteran players called him "'The last of the old leather.'" His brother Rolf (b.1946) was also an NFL player with the St. Louis Cardinals and the 49ers, where the two played together in 1972 and 1973.

Krueger's 15-year tenure with the 49ers is tied with Len Rohde for fourth in team history, behind John Brodie, Jerry Rice, and Jimmy Johnson. He was a mentor, father figure, or big brother to many players on the team; and was particularly close with Howard Mudd. Mudd said of Krueger, "'Charlie Krueger is such a pure guy, he has no enemies. ... But he is an incredibly complex man. I always felt he cared too much about football'".

Toward the conclusion of his career, Krueger said "'In 1958 I came into the NFL and it was purely a game. ... Fifteen years later, it is strictly a marketing enterprise. I'm a dinosaur who's survived the Ice Age only to discover I'm caught between hard rock and hot clothes'".

== Honors ==
Krueger was inducted into the National Football Foundation College Football Hall of Fame in 1983, and was included in the inaugural 49ers Hall of Fame class in 2009. In 2014, he was inducted into the Texas Sports Hall of Fame.

== Lawsuit against the 49ers ==
At age 51 in 1988, Krueger was awarded more than $2.3 million in damages stemming from a lawsuit against the San Francisco 49ers. The judge found that Krueger received repeated anesthetic injections during his NFL career so that he could continue to play in spite of significant knee injuries. The decision found that the 49ers were not truthful with Krueger regarding the seriousness of his injuries, which left him with severe chronic pain after his playing days.

== Personal life and death ==
From 1960 to his death, Krueger lived in Clayton, California where he was involved with charitable organizations. He suffered health problems in his later years that prevented him from enjoying the outdoors.

He died at the age of 84 on February 5, 2021, following heart and kidney failure, eight days after his birthday. He was survived by his wife of 48 years, Kristin Adler Krueger. A man of diverse interests and friendships, the small-town rugged Texas football lineman had a nearly 50-year marriage to the European-educated daughter of San Francisco Opera General Director Kurt Herbert Adler.
