= King Hill =

American football player (1936–2012)

No. 16, 10, 15
- Positions: Quarterback, punter

Personal information
- Born: November 8, 1936; Hamilton, Texas, U.S.
- Died: July 14, 2012 (aged 75); Spring, Texas, U.S.
- Listed height: 6 ft 3 in (1.91 m)
- Listed weight: 212 lb (96 kg)

Career information
- High school: Brazosport (Freeport, Texas)
- College: Rice
- NFL draft: 1958: 1st round, 1st overall pick

Career history

Playing
- Chicago / St. Louis Cardinals (1958–1960); Philadelphia Eagles (1961–1968); Minnesota Vikings (1968); St. Louis Cardinals (1969)

Coaching
- Houston Oilers (1972–1974) Assistant; Houston Oilers (1975–1976) Offensive coordinator; Houston Oilers (1977–1980) Receivers; New Orleans Saints (1981–1985) Offensive coordinator

Awards and highlights
- Consensus All-American (1957); First-team All-SWC (1957); Second-team All-SWC (1956)

Career NFL statistics
- Passing attempts: 881
- Passing completions: 429
- Completion percentage: 48.7%
- TD–INT: 37–71
- Passing yards: 5,553
- Passer rating: 49.3
- Punts: 368
- Punting yards: 15,181
- Stats at Pro Football Reference
- Coaching profile at Pro Football Reference

Stuart King Hill (November 8, 1936 – July 14, 2012) was an American professional football player who was a quarterback and punter in the National Football League (NFL) for the Chicago / St. Louis Cardinals, Philadelphia Eagles, and Minnesota Vikings. He played college football for the Rice Owls.

== Early life and college football ==
Hill was born on November 8, 1936, in Hamilton, Texas, to Earl and Dorothy Hill. After attending Brazosport High School in Freeport, Texas, where he was a multi-sport athlete, Hill went to Rice Institute in Houston, and played football under College Football Hall of Fame coach Jess Neely. He played offense, defense and punted on the Rice team. On offense, he split time as quarterback of the Owls with Frank Ryan, who also later played in the NFL.

Hill was an Associated Press (AP) All-American in 1957. In his two years playing quarterback (1956 and 1957), Hill passed for eight touchdowns and rushed for eight touchdowns, and had rates of 118.1 and 139.3 respectively.

On November 16, 1957, the Owls engineered one of the biggest victories in program history. The Owls faced number 1 ranked Texas A&M, who had not lost in 18 games, coached by Bear Bryant (who had tried to recruit Hill out of high school). Hill played the majority of the game at quarterback when Ryan sprained his knee early; served as punter on booming punts; intercepted two passes as a safety in the fourth quarter; and made a touchdown-saving tackle on John David Crow (winner of the Heisman Trophy that year) as Rice held on to win 7–6. (Ironically, Crow and Hill would become teammates in the NFL and good friends in life.) Aggies coach Bear Bryant, who had always praised Hill, said, "'He did everything but take up tickets.'"

It propelled the Owls to the Southwest Conference title (their last until 1994), and they played in the Cotton Bowl on New Year's Day, where Rice lost to Navy. At the end of the year, Rice was ranked eighth in the nation by the Associated Press, and 7th by United Press International. He also played on the golf team for the program, as well as the basketball team.

Hill was inducted into the Rice Owls Hall of Fame in 1974.

== NFL career ==
=== Playing career ===
Hill was the first player selected in the 1958 NFL draft by the Chicago Cardinals. As the Cardinals were the only team remaining who had not been awarded the "bonus pick" as determined by lottery, they had the first pick along with the second overall pick. They picked Hill with the first pick (the lottery bonus pick) and John David Crow with the second in a draft that had four future Pro Bowlers in the first five picks (Hill being the exception among Crow, Dan Currie, Lou Michaels and Red Phillips).

Hill threw nine passes in his rookie season, with two being for interceptions. Eventually he had a bigger role in punting during his career, going from punting eight combined times in his first three seasons with the Cardinals, to punting 55 times for 2,403 yards for the Eagles in just his first year in Philadelphia, 1961. He had his best season in rushing in 1959, as a quarterback, where he scored five touchdowns on 39 carries for 167 yards, although it also involved a league-leading 13 fumbles with just two recoveries.

Quarterbacking as a passer with the Cardinals was no better for Hill when he started. He served as the starter for ten games of the 1959 season. He started on Opening Day against Washington, going 14-of-23 for 229 yards with two touchdowns and one interception to go with a rushing touchdown in the 49–21 victory. It was the first of only two victories that season for Hill, who threw for 1,015 yards on 7 touchdowns to 13 interceptions. He started the first game of the 1960 season and threw 8-of-18 for 98 yards with a touchdown and two interceptions before being taken out for John Roach, who threw four touchdowns in the 43–21 victory. He threw just 37 more passes that year, his last for the team.

The Cardinals traded Hill to the Philadelphia Eagles in 1961, where he was to serve as a backup quarterback to future hall of famer Sonny Jurgenson. During training camp that year, he had to have seven abscessed teeth removed. He served as a backup to Jurgenson and then Norm Snead for eight seasons, starting in 18 games during that time. His principal role with the Eagles was being used as a punter. His best seasons as an Eagles' punter came in 1961, when he averaged 43.7 yards a punt (a career high), and 1963 with 69 punts for 2,972 yards (a career high) for a 43.1 average. In November 1962, he had an 80 yard punt against the Green Bay Packers, the third longest in team history (as of 2024).

Hill started six games as quarterback in 1963 as well, going 1–4–1. He played with both the Eagles and the Minnesota Vikings in 1968, starting in two games for the Eagles. He closed out his career with St. Louis in 1969. He punted 73 times for 2,747 yards, while seeing a punt blocked versus Philadelphia, the first and only punt blocked in his career. He threw one final pass that year, a completion for seven yards versus Chicago.

Hill was also a key figure in the NFL Players Association. Hill was vice-president of the NFLPA in 1968, when the players threatened to strike, and was a public voice of the players' issues. Hill signed the first collective bargaining agreement in professional football and represented players for the Players Association for nine years, including during the 1968 strike.

=== Coaching and scouting career ===
==== Houston Oilers ====
In 1970, Hill became a scout for the Houston Oilers. In 1972, Hill was hired to serve as an Oilers' assistant coach under Bill Peterson. In 1973, he became quarterbacks coach under Peterson, who was fired during the year, and then remained in that position under new head coach Sid Gillman, staying quarterbacks coach through 1974 under Gillman. In 1974, Bum Phillips was hired as the Oilers defensive coordinator and rose from defensive coordinator to head coach the following year. Phillips made Hill his offensive coordinator in 1975 and 1976.

Hill worked for the team and Phillips until 1980, as receivers coach from 1977-1980 as well as quarterbacks coach in 1980, with the best days coming under Phillips. Phillips had Ken Shipp as his offensive coordinator in 1977, but fired him after that year, and never replaced the offensive coordinator position. Instead, he had Hill, Andy Bourgeois and Joe Bugel run the offense together, until Phillips was fired in 1980.

Phillips described Hill as such: “King was different from almost anybody I’ve ever worked with. He was the most polite, gentle man. And, [on the] football field, he was polite but direct. When he said something, he meant it. He was the ideal guy to have on your staff. [Coaching] wasn’t work to him. He really enjoyed it. He could communicate without all that hollering. You don’t need to raise your voice when you know what you’re talking about.” The Oilers made the postseason each time from 1978 to 1980 (bolstered by the offense of players such as Earl Campbell) but could not reach the Super Bowl.

==== New Orleans Saints ====
When Phillips was fired after the 1980 season ended, Hill followed him to the New Orleans Saints, serving as Phillips' offensive coordinator from 1981 to 1985. The 1983 team was a missed field goal away from a playoff berth, but the Saints never reached the postseason under Phillips before he resigned in 1985.

==== Philadelphia Eagles ====
Hill was hired as a regional scout for the Philadelphia Eagles in the Western United States and Canada in 1986, where he served until 1992. He was described by a former Eagles' publicist as a real gentleman who everyone liked, as well as a great golfer.

== Golf and charities ==
After retiring from coaching, he became a golf-course marketing director in Houston. Always a skilled golfer, Hill never gave up his amateur status and through the years has participated in hundreds of tournaments, as well as being an active participant in the promotion of charitable golf tournaments in Texas and Louisiana. He also assisted in the founding and working of the Ronald McDonald Houses in Texas and Louisiana. Hill also helped with Big Brothers and other children causes in Texas, including the Special Olympics. His golf team won first place in the NFL Alumni Tournament in 1995 and 2001. He placed second in the tournament in 1996.

== Death ==
Hill died at age 75 in 2012 after a long illness. He is buried at Forest Park Cemetery at The Woodlands.
