= Harry Jacobs (American football) =

American football player (1937–2021)

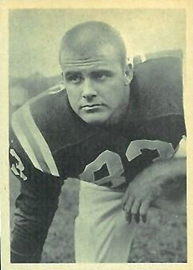
- Jacobs in 1961

No. 83, 54, 64, 52
- Positions: Linebacker, defensive end

Personal information
- Born: February 4, 1937; Canton, Illinois, U.S.
- Died: December 17, 2021 (aged 84); Buffalo, New York, U.S.
- Listed height: 6 ft 1 in (1.85 m)
- Listed weight: 226 lb (103 kg)

Career information
- High school: Canton
- College: Bradley (1955–1958)
- NFL draft: 1959: 11th round, 125th overall pick

Career history
- Boston Patriots (1960–1962); Buffalo Bills (1963–1969); New Orleans Saints (1970)

Awards and highlights
- 2× AFL champion (1964, 1965); 2× AFL All-Star (1965, 1969); Most games played with same LB partners, 62 (John Tracey and Mike Stratton)

Career NFL/AFL statistics
- Interceptions: 12
- Fumble recoveries: 1
- Sacks: 14
- Stats at Pro Football Reference

Harry Edwards Jacobs (February 4, 1937 – December 17, 2021) was an American professional football player who was a linebacker in the American Football League (AFL) and National Football League (NFL). He played college football for Bradley University. He played professionally in the AFL for the Boston Patriots from 1960 through 1962, and for the Buffalo Bills from 1963 through 1969. He then played in the NFL for the New Orleans Saints from 1970 to 1973.

== Professional career ==
Jacobs played in the playoffs four straight years (1963–1966) with the Bills, and was an AFL All-Star in 1965 and 1969. With John Tracey and Mike Stratton he filled out one of pro football's best linebacking units, which played together for 62 consecutive games from 1963 through 1967, and wreaked havoc on many offensive lines, a professional football record. They helped the Bills' formidable front four hold opposing teams without a 100-yard rusher for seventeen consecutive games in 1964 and 1965, and achieved American Football League championships in both those years. He is one of only twenty players who played in the American Football League throughout its ten-year existence.

== Personal life ==
Jacobs died in a nursing home on December 17, 2021, at the age of 84, having suffered from dementia in his later years.

== See also ==
- List of American Football League players
