= John Tracey =

American football player (1933–1978)

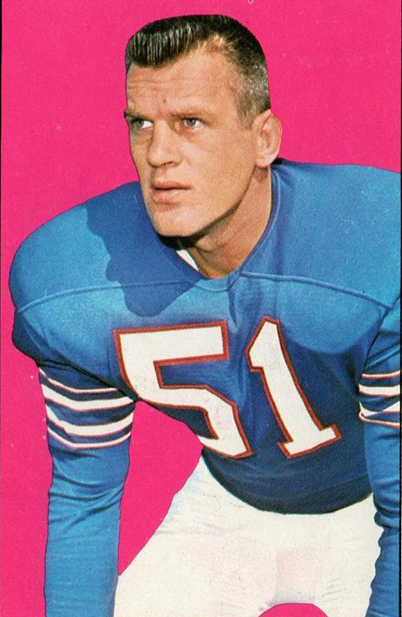
- Tracey in 1965

No. 80, 85, 51
- Positions: Linebacker, end, defensive end

Personal information
- Born: June 27, 1933; Philadelphia, Pennsylvania, U.S.
- Died: September 21, 1978 (aged 45); Medford Lakes, New Jersey, U.S.
- Listed height: 6 ft 3 in (1.91 m)
- Listed weight: 225 lb (102 kg)

Career information
- High school: Northeast (Philadelphia)
- College: Texas A&M (1955–1958)
- NFL draft: 1959: 4th round, 44th overall pick

Career history
- Chicago/St. Louis Cardinals (1959–1960); Philadelphia Eagles (1961); Buffalo Bills (1962–1967)

Awards and highlights
- 2× AFL champion (1964, 1965); Second-team All-AFL (1965); 2× AFL All-Star (1965, 1966); First-team All-SWC (1958); 2× Second-team All-SWC (1956, 1957)

Career NFL/AFL statistics
- Interceptions: 12
- Fumble recoveries: 3
- Sacks: 21.5
- Receptions: 20
- Receiving yards: 303
- Stats at Pro Football Reference

John Joseph Tracey (June 27, 1933 – September 21, 1978) was an American football linebacker. At Texas A&M University, Tracey held school records for most receptions and most yards receiving. Another "NFL Reject", when he joined the American Football League (AFL)'s Buffalo Bills in 1962, Lou Saban liked his speed and agility, and used him at linebacker, where with Harry Jacobs and Mike Stratton he filled out the AFL's best linebacking crew, playing together for 62 consecutive games from 1963 through 1967, a professional football record. They helped the formidable front four hold opposing teams without a 100-yard rusher for seventeen consecutive games in 1964 and 1965, and achieved American Football League championships in both those years. In 1963, he led the team with five interceptions. Tracey was an AFL All-Star in 1965 and 1966. He died on September 21, 1978, from lung cancer.

== See also ==
- Other American Football League players
