= Rolf Krueger =

American football player (born 1946)

No. 70, 78
- Positions: Defensive end, Defensive tackle

Personal information
- Born: December 8, 1946 (age 79); Caldwell, Texas, U.S.
- Listed height: 6 ft 4 in (1.93 m)
- Listed weight: 253 lb (115 kg)

Career information
- High school: Caldwell
- College: Texas A&M
- NFL draft: 1969: 2nd round, 35th overall pick

Career history
- St. Louis Cardinals (1969–1971); San Francisco 49ers (1972–1974)

Awards and highlights
- Second-team All-American (1968); First-team All-SWC (1968)

Career NFL statistics
- Sacks: 6.5
- Stats at Pro Football Reference

Rolf Frank Krueger (born December 8, 1946) is an American former professional football player who was a defensive end and defensive tackle for six seasons in the National Football League (NFL). He played college football for the Texas A&M Aggies. Krueger played in the NFL for the St. Louis Cardinals and the San Francisco 49ers. He is the brother of Charlie Krueger (b.1937); they were teammates in 1972 and 1973 with the 49ers.

== Early life ==
Krueger was born on December 8, 1946, in Caldwell, Texas. He was one of eight children, raised in a poor family. Krueger and his four brothers all played football. Like Krueger, his ten-year older brother Charlie Krueger would play college football at Texas A&M and in the NFL. The family moved to Bryan, Texas when Krueger was in 6th grade.

He attended Stephen F. Austin High School, formerly known as Bryan High School, in Bryan. Krueger played on the football team at both offensive and defensive tackle. He was on the varsity team three years. In December 1964, he was named to both the All-District 13-4A north zone offensive and defensive teams at offensive and defensive tackle. That same December, the local Lions Club named him one of the team's four outstanding players, presenting him with a trophy as best offensive lineman. He was honored by the Waco Herald-Tribune as one of the top 25 players in central Texas.

When he graduated high school in 1965, he was 6 ft 3½ in (1.92 m) 220 lb. (99.8 kg). He was one of 33 Texas players chosen to play in an August 1965 high school all-star game in Hershey, Pennsylvania against 33 Pennsylvania players.

== College ==
Although recruited by Bear Bryant for Alabama, Krueger chose to attend Texas A&M under head coach Gene Stallings, where his brother Charlie had been an All-American football player in 1956. Krueger first became a starter at defensive tackle in his sophomore year. Before his junior season began, Krueger was also added to the offensive line as a tackle. As a junior in 1967, the Aggies lost their first four games, before winning the next seven consecutive games and earning the Southwest Conference title. The team then went on to upset the University of Alabama in the 1968 Cotton Bowl, 20–16. Playing on defense, Krueger recovered a fumble by Alabama quarterback Ken Stabler on the game's first play.

Going into his senior season in 1968, Krueger was a 6 ft 4 in (1.93 m) 240 lb. (108.9 kg) defensive tackle. He was named to the Associated Press's (AP) All-Southwest Conference Team in 1968, at defensive middle guard, though recognized for his ability to play multiple defensive line positions. In 1967, as a junior, the AP named him second-team All-SWC at defensive tackle. He was an AP honorable mention for All-American at tackle in 1968. He was named to The Sporting News and Time magazine All-America teams, and was a second-team United Press International (UPI) All-American. It is also reported he was an All-American at offensive tackle.

He was named to the Texas A&M Silver Anniversary Team. He was inducted into the Texas A&M Athletic Hall of Fame in 1995, joining Charlie Krueger who was inducted in 1972.

== Professional career ==
The St. Louis Cardinals selected Krueger in the second round of the 1969 NFL/AFL draft (35th overall). Krueger came into the NFL at 6 ft 4 in (1.93 m) 245 lb. (111.1 kg). In 1969, Krueger started 10 games at left defensive end for the Cardinals, after starting defensive end Don Brumm suffered a season ending knee injury, after playing only four games. Krueger had an impressive rookie season after replacing Brumm, but the team finished 4–9–1. He had 1.5 quarterback sacks that season.

In 1970, the Cardinals cut Brumm for reporting to training camp overweight. Krueger started all 14 games at left defensive end that season. The team improved to 8–5–1, and had three consecutive shutouts in November, something that had not occurred since 1935. The Cardinals shut out weak Houston and Boston teams, 44–0 on November 1 and 31–0 on November 8, respectively. Then, on November 16, on Monday Night Football, the Cardinals defeated the eventual National Football Conference champion Dallas Cowboys, 38–0. The Cardinals were 7–2 at that point in the season, but only won a single game the rest of the season and missed the playoffs. The defense allowed the fifth fewest points of any team in the NFL, and was seventh in the league in sacks, and tenth in total yards allowed.

The now 250 lb. (113.4 kg) Krueger played on a starting defensive line next to Fred Heron (left tackle), Bob Rowe (right tackle) and Chuck Walker (right end), with Joe Schmiesing filling in at right end for an injured Walker, and reserve defensive end Cal Snowden. The six, under assistant coach Dick Voris, had 29.5 sacks between them (Walker, 7.5; Rowe, seven; Heron, five; Schmiesing, four; Snowden, 3.5; and Krueger, 2.5).

Bob Hollway became the Cardinals new head coach in 1971. Hollway had coached the Minnesota Vikings defensive line (the Purple People Eaters) and brought a focus on an attacking pass rush to the Cardinals. However, before the season started, he believed the team's only potentially great pass rusher was rookie Ron Yankowski, and not any of Krueger, Heron, Rowe or Walker.

Krueger began the season on the bench, with Yankowski starting at left end. Krueger's first start came in Week 5, when he replaced Yankowski at left end. Krueger started at left end for the next three weeks, after Hollway had announced he would be starting in Yankowski's place. Yankowski was reinserted at left end in Week 9, and Krueger returned to the bench. Krueger replaced Heron at starting left tackle in Week 10 and remained the starting left tackle through the end of the season, next to Yankowski at starting left end. Schmiesing started four games, mainly backing up Walker.

Yankowski finished the season with one sack, Heron with two, Krueger with 2.5, Rowe (who started every game) with 5.5, and Walker (who started all 11 games in which he played) with five. The Cardinals record fell to 4–9–1. The 1971 Cardinals defense fell to 15th in points allowed, 20th in total yards allowed, and 22nd in sacks.

Krueger played out his option with the Cardinals in 1971 and became a free agent. He stated that he did not want to return to the Cardinals, and his desire to leave was not related to money. He joined the San Francisco 49ers before the start of the 1972 season; with the Cardinals receiving one or two future high draft picks as compensation. The 25-year old Krueger joined his 35-year-old brother Charlie in San Francisco, where they were teammates in 1972 and 1973.

Krueger only played four games for the 49ers in 1972, in reserve. He spent time on the taxi squad that season. His 1972 season was described as "a year in limbo". In 1973, as a reserve and starter, he appeared in 14 games for the 49ers. Krueger missed five games in 1974 with a dislocated shoulder, and played in nine games as a reserve lineman. He retired before the 1975 season, at age 27.

== Personal life ==
After retiring, he was a trouble shooter for an oil well service company in Houston. His son Rolf Krueger played football for Rice University as a 6 ft 3 in (1.91 m) 290 lb. (131.5) offensive lineman.
