= 1957 All-Southwest Conference football team =

American college football all-star team

The 1957 All-Southwest Conference football team consists of American football players chosen by various organizations for All-Southwest Conference teams for the 1957 college football season. The selectors for the 1957 season included the Associated Press (AP) and the United Press (UP). Players selected as first-team players by both the AP and UP are designated in bold.

== All Southwest selections ==
=== Backs ===
- **King Hill**, Rice (AP-1; UP-1 [QB])
- **John David Crow**, Texas A&M (AP-1; UP-1 [HB]) (1957 Heisman Trophy winner; College Football Hall of Fame)
- **Jim Shofner**, TCU (AP-1; UP-1 [HB])
- **Gerald Nesbitt**, Arkansas (AP-1; UP-1 [FB])
- Don Meredith, SMU (AP-2 [QB])
- Roddy Osborne, Texas A&M (AP-2; UPI-2 [QB])
- Buddy Dike, TCU (AP-2 [FB])
- Donnie Stone, Arkansas (AP-2 [HB])

=== Ends ===
- **Buddy Dial**, Rice (AP-1; UP-1) (College Football Hall of Fame)
- **Bobby Marks**, Texas A&M (AP-1; UP-1)
- Willard Dewveall, SMU (AP-2; UPI-2)
- Maurice Doke, Texas (AP-2)
- John Tracey, Texas A&M (UPI-2)

=== Tackles ===
- **Charlie Krueger**, Texas A&M (AP-1; UP-1)
- **Larry Whitmire**, Rice (AP-1; UP-1)
- Bobby Jack Oliver, Baylor (AP-2; UPI-2)
- Garland Kennon, Texas (AP-2; UPI-2)

=== Guards ===
- **Matt Gorges**, Rice (AP-1; UP-1)
- **Tom Koenig**, SMU (AP-1; UP-1)
- Clyde Letbetter, Baylor (AP-1; UPI-2)
- Don Wilson, Texas (AP-2; UPI-2)
- Jerry Ford, Arkansas (AP-2)

=== Centers ===
- **Jay Donathan**, Arkansas (AP-1; UP-1)
- Louis Del Homme, Texas (AP-2; UPI-2)

== Key ==
AP = Associated Press

UP = United Press

Bold = Consensus first-team selection of both the AP and UP

== See also ==
- 1957 College Football All-America Team
