= Springhill, Louisiana =

City in Louisiana, United States

Springhill
- City
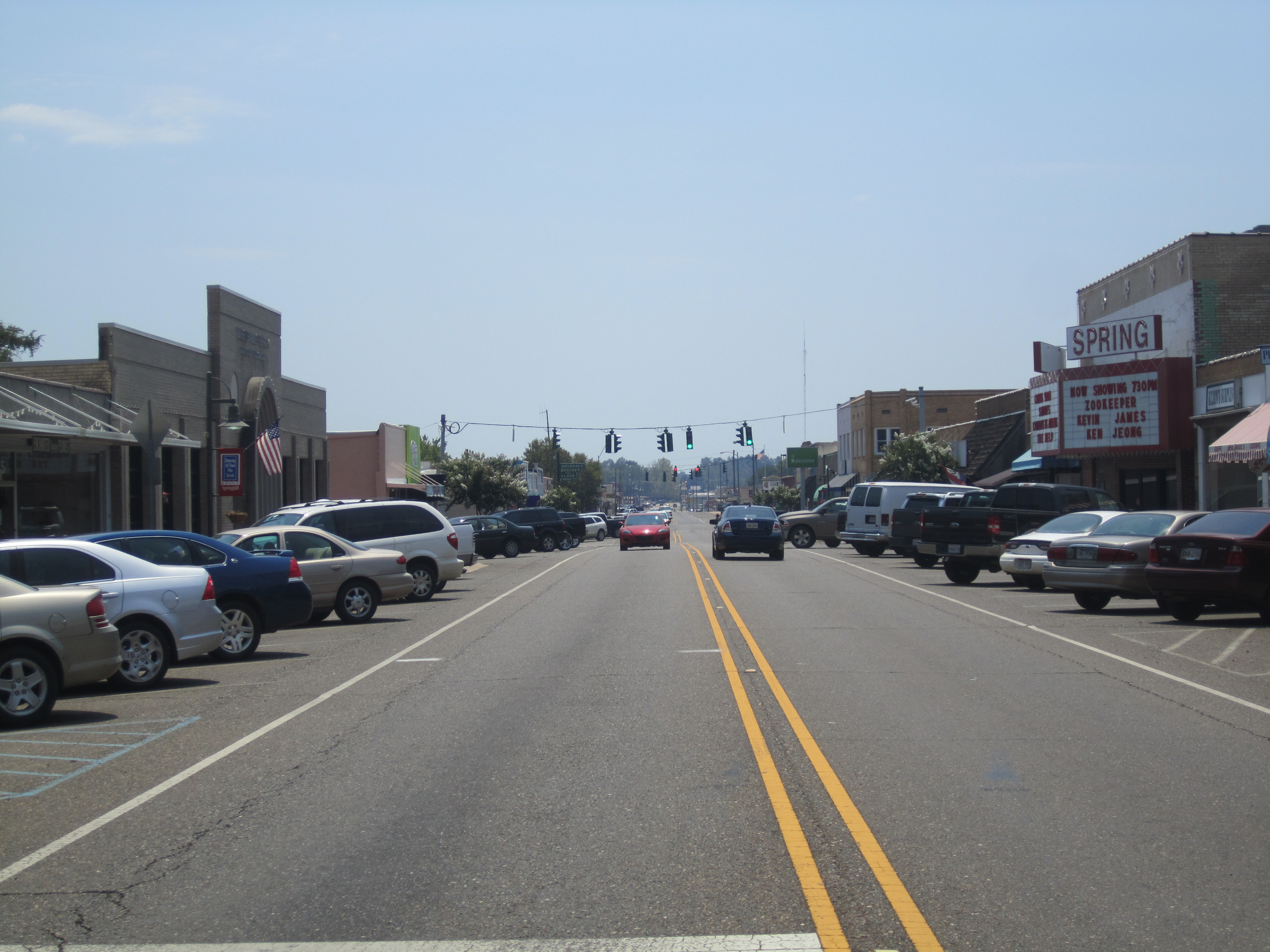
- Downtown Springhill

- Location of Springhill in Webster Parish, Louisiana.

- Location of Louisiana in the United States
- Coordinates: 33°00′04″N 93°27′36″W
- Country: United States
- State: Louisiana
- Parish: Webster
- Settled: 1818
- Incorporated: 1902

Area
  - Total: 6.29 sq mi (16.30 km^{2})
  - Land: 6.21 sq mi (16.09 km^{2})
  - Water: 0.081 sq mi (0.21 km^{2})
- Elevation: 230 ft (70 m)

Population (2020)
  - Total: 4,801
  - Density: 772.7/sq mi (298.34/km^{2})
- Time zone: UTC-6 (CST)
  - Summer (DST): UTC-5 (CDT)
- ZIP code: 71075
- Area code: 318
- FIPS code: 22-72485
- GNIS feature ID: 2405514
- Website: www.springhilllouisiana.gov

Springhill is a small city in the northernmost part of Webster Parish, Louisiana, United States. As of the 2020 census, Springhill had a population of 4,801. Springhill is part of the Minden Micropolitan Statistical Area though it is thirty miles north of Minden, the seat of government of Webster Parish. The Springhill population is 34 percent African American, compared to 25 percent minority in 2000.

== History ==
Webster Parish was first permanently settled about 1818 near Overton south of the parish seat of Minden. According to genealogical findings, William Farmer, Samuel Monzingo, J. A. Byrnes, and Joseph Murrell were the first settlers in the area. These settlers formed an area that was initially referred to informally as "Piney Woods." In 1894, though still unincorporated, what would eventually become Springhill took the name "Barefoot, Louisiana" on the notions of a Mrs. Maxwell, who assigned the name based on her observations that many men in the community went to work without shoes. The town that is today Springhill was finally incorporated in 1902. The first mayor was N.B. Taylor, who followed a year thereafter by B.D. Wilson. Peter Modisette was the mayor from 1914 to 1925.

Springhill City Hall is located opposite the Springhill Civic Center, a meeting hall which cost $500,000 and was financed in the late 1960s under a voter-approved bond issue, with millage taxes levied against property owners.

=== Timber industry ===
Springhill's close association with the timber industry began in 1896 with the arrival of the Pine Woods Lumber Company. Springhill prospered from timber and for a time was a boomtown. The Pine Woods Lumber Company went out of business during the Great Depression, and the population of Springhill dwindled. The Pine Woods Lumber Company facility was purchased by the Frost Lumber Company, which sold to Springhill Lumber Company. The Springhill Lumber Company later became Anthony Forest Products, which remained in Springhill until 1972.

The most significant local economic force, however, was the establishment of a massive pulp paper mill in 1937 by International Paper Company. The construction of the paper mill greatly expanded the regional economic importance of Springhill and further cemented ties to the timber industry. Though technically within the town of Cullen just south of Springhill, the facility was regionally known as the "Springhill paper mill." The later addition of a wood products plant and container (box) plant by International Paper further established Springhill as one of the most important manufacturing and processing centers in northern Louisiana. In 1979, International Paper closed the paper mill, which along with a significant general downturn in the petroleum industry caused a deterioration of the local economy. Though the paper mill closed, International Paper maintained its wood products and container-producing facilities. During 2006–2007, IP sold the wood products plant to its main rival, Georgia Pacific and liquidated its significant land holdings in the Springhill area. The container division, often called the "box plant", remains the last remnant of International Paper in Springhill.

After it purchased the plywood mill from International Paper, Georgia Pacific closed the plant. Another major employer, Trane, which manufactures air-conditioning components, relocated to Mexico.

== Geography ==
According to the United States Census Bureau, the city has a total area of 6.3 square miles (16 km^{2}), of which 6.2 square miles (16 km^{2}) is land and 0.1 square miles (0.26 km^{2}) (0.80%) is water.

== Demographics ==
Historical population
Census	Pop.	Note	%±
1920	748		—
1930	1,546		106.7%
1940	2,822		82.5%
1950	3,383		19.9%
1960	6,437		90.3%
1970	6,496		0.9%
1980	6,516		0.3%
1990	5,668		−13.0%
2000	5,439		−4.0%
2010	5,269		−3.1%
2020	4,801		−8.9%
2025 (est.)	4,437	▼	−7.6%
U.S. Decennial Census

=== 2020 census ===
As of the 2020 census, Springhill had a population of 4,801. The median age was 42.6 years. 23.3% of residents were under the age of 18 and 21.6% were 65 years of age or older. For every 100 females there were 88.9 males, and for every 100 females age 18 and over there were 84.8 males age 18 and over.

93.3% of residents lived in urban areas, while 6.7% lived in rural areas.

There were 2,031 households and 1,171 families in Springhill. Of the households, 28.5% had children under the age of 18 living in them. Of all households, 35.2% were married-couple households, 19.4% were households with a male householder and no spouse or partner present, and 38.7% were households with a female householder and no spouse or partner present. About 33.3% of all households were made up of individuals, and 16.1% had someone living alone who was 65 years of age or older.

There were 2,460 housing units, of which 17.4% were vacant. The homeowner vacancy rate was 2.7% and the rental vacancy rate was 10.4%.

Springhill racial composition as of 2020
Race	Number	Percentage
White (non-Hispanic)	2,850	59.36%
Black or African American (non-Hispanic)	1,649	34.35%
Native American	10	0.21%
Asian	32	0.67%
Other/Mixed	182	3.79%
Hispanic or Latino	78	1.62%

== Arts and culture ==
Springhill hosts an annual Lumberjack Festival, which includes crafts, Kids Corner, Louisiana food, live music, and a parade.

== Government ==
Mayors included Ed Shultz (1942–1954), Charles McConnell (1954–1958), Jesse L. Boucher (1958–1962), James Allen (1962–1974), M. A. Gleason, Jr. (1974–1978), Johnny D. Herrington (1978–1986 and 1995–2006), a brother-in-law of Boucher, James Curtis Smith (1987–1994), and Carroll Breaux, who assumed office on January 1, 2007. Breaux, an Independent, is the first non-Democrat to serve as Springhill mayor. He unseated Herrington, 973–782, in the nonpartisan blanket primary held on September 30, 2006. Breaux was succeeded in 2019 by another No Party mayor, Ray Huddleston.

== Education ==
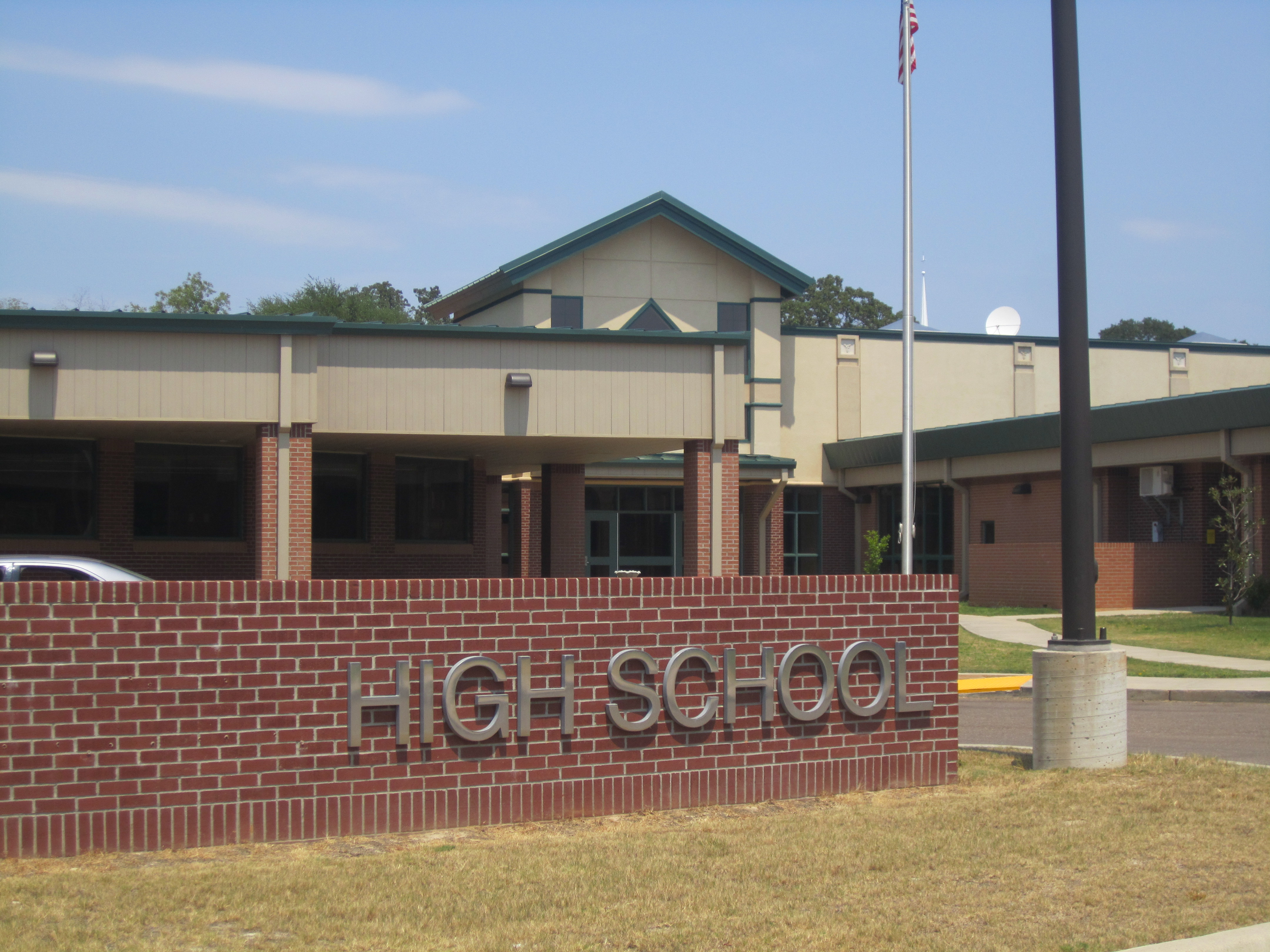
North Webster High School in Springhill; junior high pupils now attend school in Sarepta

Springhill has a high school, North Webster High School, formerly the Springhill Jr./Sr. High School, which housed grades seven through twelve in prior to 2011. After budget cuts and consolidation, the school now enrolls ninth through twelfth- graders from all of northern Webster Parish. All former Springhill Junior High pupils now attend school in Sarepta at North Webster Junior High School. Elementary schools, Browning Elementary and Brown Middle, remained the same after consolidation. PK-5th grade pupils in Springhill still attend these schools.

The former campus of the Georgia Howell Elementary School, built in 1956, has been closed because of unsafe building conditions. The pupils formerly assigned there now attend Browning or Brown Middle.

== Media ==
The 1979 film Five Days from Home, which was directed by and starred George Peppard, was filmed primarily in Springhill. Peppard's third wife, Sherry Boucher, is a Springhill native; her father, Jesse L. Boucher was a businessman and developer who served as mayor of Springhill.

== Notable people ==
- Trace Adkins – Country music singer
- Savannah Smith Boucher – actress
- Sherry Boucher – former Hollywood actress and realtor in Bossier Parish
- Shannen W. Coffin – Former Counsel to Vice President Dick Cheney
- John David Crow – football player, Winner of the 1957 Heisman Trophy
- Jack Montgomery – politician and lawyer
- Joe Stampley – Country music artist who was part of a duo with Moe Bandy
- John Stephens football player for New England Patriots.
- Steve Weddle – novelist and journalist
- John Corey Whaley – author of young adult literary fiction, Where Things Come Back.
- Devin White - All-American linebacker at LSU, graduate of North Webster High School
