= Devin White =

American football player (born 1998)

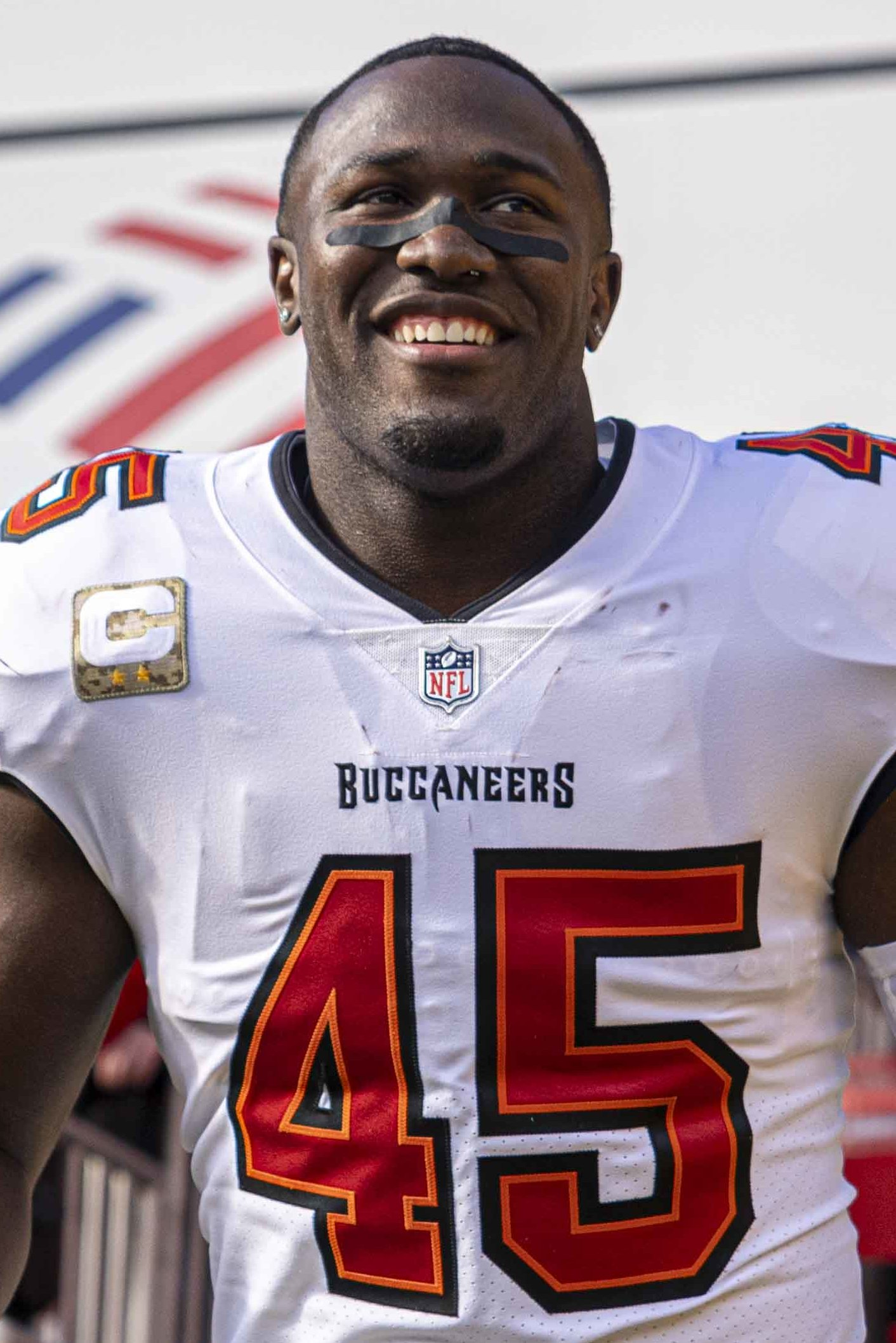
- White with the Tampa Bay Buccaneers in 2021

No. 45 – Detroit Lions
- Position: Linebacker
- Roster status: Injured reserve

Personal information
- Born: February 17, 1998 (age 28); Springhill, Louisiana, U.S.
- Listed height: 6 ft 0 in (1.83 m)
- Listed weight: 252 lb (114 kg)

Career information
- High school: North Webster (Springhill, Louisiana)
- College: LSU (2016–2018)
- NFL draft: 2019: 1st round, 5th overall pick

Career history
- Tampa Bay Buccaneers (2019–2023); Philadelphia Eagles (2024); Houston Texans (2024); Las Vegas Raiders (2025); Detroit Lions (2026–present)

Awards and highlights
- Super Bowl champion (LV); Second-team All-Pro (2020); Pro Bowl (2021); PFWA All-Rookie Team (2019); Butkus Award (2018); Consensus All-American (2018); Second-team All-American (2017); 2× First-team All-SEC (2017, 2018); SEC All-Freshman Team (2016)

Career NFL statistics as of Week 5, 2026
- Total tackles: 769
- Sacks: 25.5
- Forced fumbles: 7
- Fumble recoveries: 9
- Pass deflections: 24
- Interceptions: 4
- Defensive touchdowns: 2
- Stats at Pro Football Reference

Devin Marcel White (born February 17, 1998) is an American professional football linebacker for the Detroit Lions of the National Football League (NFL). He played college football for the LSU Tigers, and was selected by the Tampa Bay Buccaneers fifth overall in the 2019 NFL draft. He spent five seasons with the Buccaneers and won a Super Bowl championship with the team in Super Bowl LV.

== Early life ==
Devin White attended North Webster High School in Springhill, Louisiana where he played football as a standout linebacker and running back.

White was a controversial recruit out of high school, having multiple run-ins with police. In November 2015, he and his teammate Keuntra Gipson were arrested for having sex with a 14-year-old, a misdemeanor in Louisiana. One month later, White was arrested for misdemeanor charges of “careless operation of a motor vehicle and flight from an officer.” Because of his legal situation, White was dismissed from the 2015 Under Armour All-America Game. Despite these controversies, he was still able to sign with LSU to play football.

== College career ==
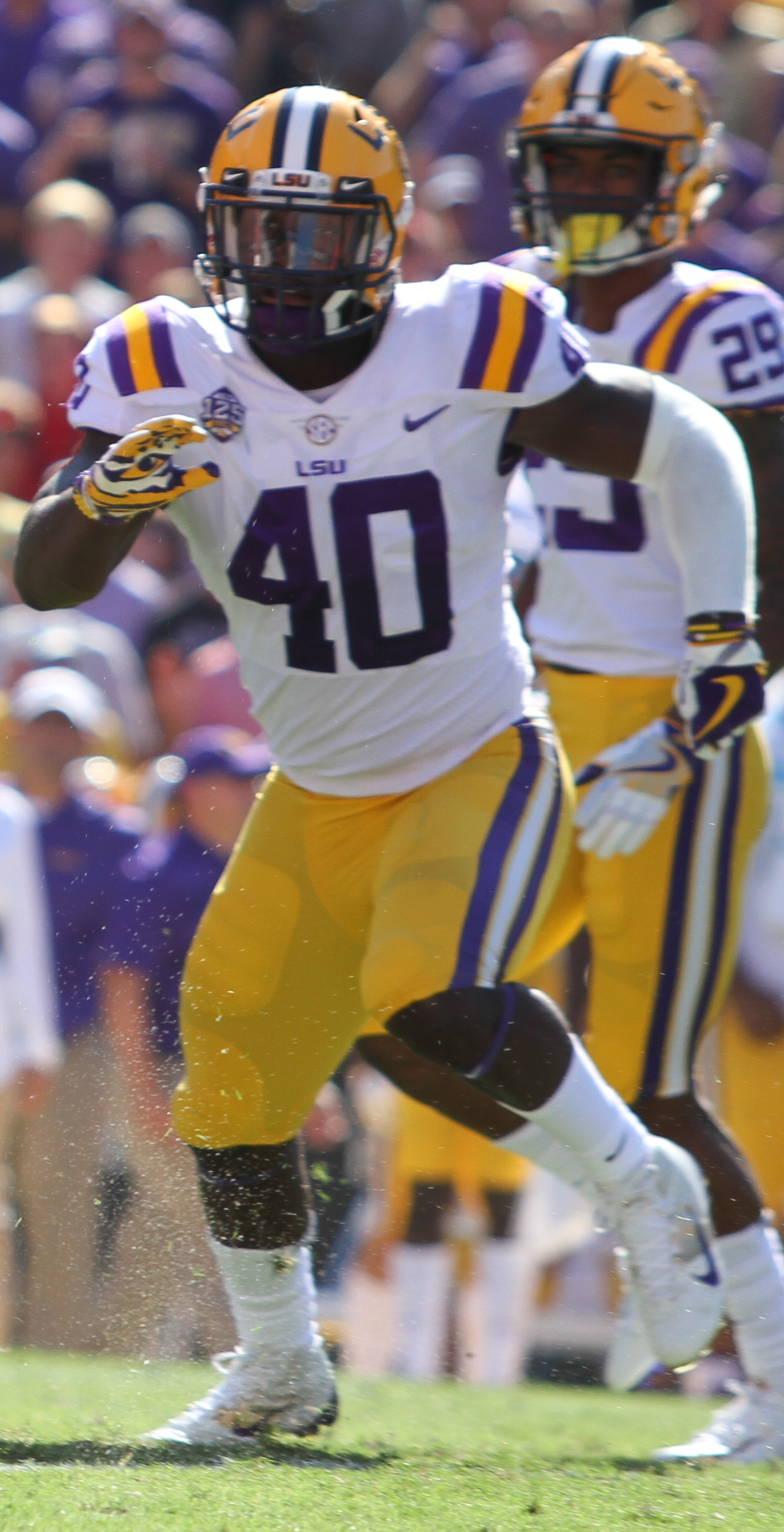
White at LSU

In his sophomore season at LSU, White led the Southeastern Conference in tackles with 133, the fourth-most tackles in a single season in school history. He became the first player in SEC history to be named Defensive Player of the Week four times in the same season. Following his junior year, White decided to forgo his senior year and enter the 2019 NFL draft.

== Professional career ==
Pre-draft measurables
Height	Weight	Arm length	Hand span	Wingspan	40-yard dash	10-yard split	20-yard split	20-yard shuttle	Three-cone drill	Vertical jump	Broad jump	Bench press
6 ft 0 in (1.83 m)	237 lb (108 kg)	32 1/8 in (0.82 m)	9 3/4 in (0.25 m)	6 ft 3 7/8 in (1.93 m)	4.42 s	1.51 s	2.58 s	4.17 s	7.07 s	39.5 in (1.00 m)	9 ft 10 in (3.00 m)	22 reps
All values from NFL Combine

=== Tampa Bay Buccaneers ===
==== 2019 season ====
White was drafted by the Tampa Bay Buccaneers in the first round with the fifth overall pick of the 2019 NFL draft. His selection made him the highest drafted LSU defensive player since Patrick Peterson in 2011, as well as the highest drafted linebacker in school history. On July 20, 2019, the Buccaneers signed White to a fully guaranteed, four-year, $29.32 million contract including a signing bonus of $19.34 million.

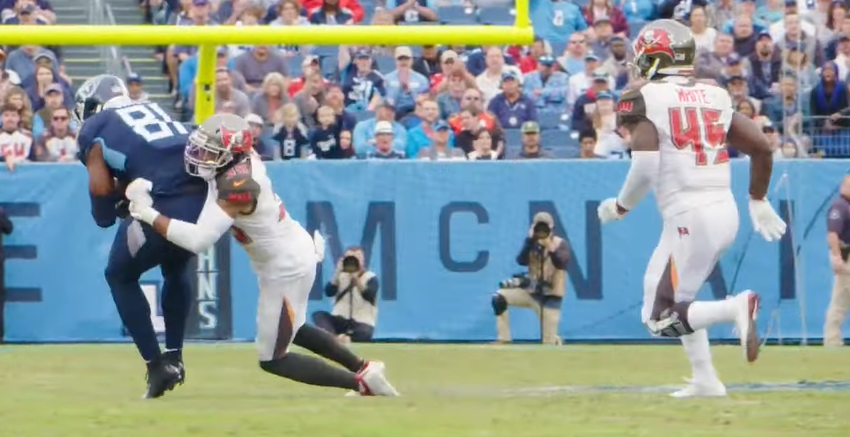
White in a game against the Tennessee Titans

White made his NFL debut in Week 1 against the San Francisco 49ers, making six tackles in the 31–17 loss. In Week 2, during a 20–14 win over the Carolina Panthers, White sprained his MCL which resulted in him missing the next three games. In Week 9 against the Seattle Seahawks, White recorded a team-high 12 tackles, half a sack on Russell Wilson, and two forced fumbles on running back Chris Carson, one of which that was recovered by teammate Jordan Whitehead in the 40–34 overtime loss. In Week 11 against the New Orleans Saints, White recorded a team-high 13 tackles in the 34–17 loss. In Week 12, during a 35–22 win against the Atlanta Falcons, White recorded eight tackles and sacked Matt Ryan twice, the first multi-sack game of his career. In Week 13, during a 28–11 win against the Jacksonville Jaguars, White had a team-high seven tackles, his first career interception off a pass thrown by Nick Foles, and recovered a strip sack by teammate Shaquil Barrett on Foles for a touchdown. As a result of White's strong play in November (39 tackles, 2.5 sacks, one pass deflection, and two forced fumbles from Weeks 9–12), he was named National Football Conference (NFC) Defensive Rookie of the Month. As a result of White's strong play in December (29 tackles, two pass deflections, one interception, one forced fumble, four fumble recoveries, and two fumble return touchdowns from Weeks 13–17), he was named the NFC Defensive Rookie of the Month.

White finished his rookie season with 91 total tackles, 2.5 sacks, three pass deflections, one interception, three forced fumbles, four fumble recoveries, and two fumble return touchdowns. He was named to the PFWA All-Rookie Team.

==== 2020 season ====
In Week 2 against the Carolina Panthers, White recorded a team-high 15 tackles, of which 11 were solo, during the 31–17 win. In Week 6 against the Green Bay Packers, White led the team with 10 tackles and sacked Aaron Rodgers once during the 38–10 win. In Week 7, during a 45–20 win against the Las Vegas Raiders, White recorded a team-high 11 tackles, of which nine were solo, as well as a career-high three sacks on Derek Carr, one of which resulted in a fumble, earning NFC Defensive Player of the Week honors. In Week 15, White recorded 12 tackles (four for a loss), sacked Matt Ryan three times, and defended two passes in a 31–27 comeback win over the Atlanta Falcons, earning his second NFC Defensive Player of the Week honors of the season. In Week 16, during a 47–7 win over the Detroit Lions, White recorded 10 tackles and a sack. On January 1, 2021, it was revealed that White tested positive for COVID-19, and, along with teammates Shaquil Barrett and Steve McLendon, was placed on the reserve/COVID list by the Buccaneers on January 1, 2021, and was subsequently activated on January 11. White finished the 2020 regular season with a team-best 140 total tackles as well as nine sacks, one forced fumble, one fumble recovery, and four pass deflections.

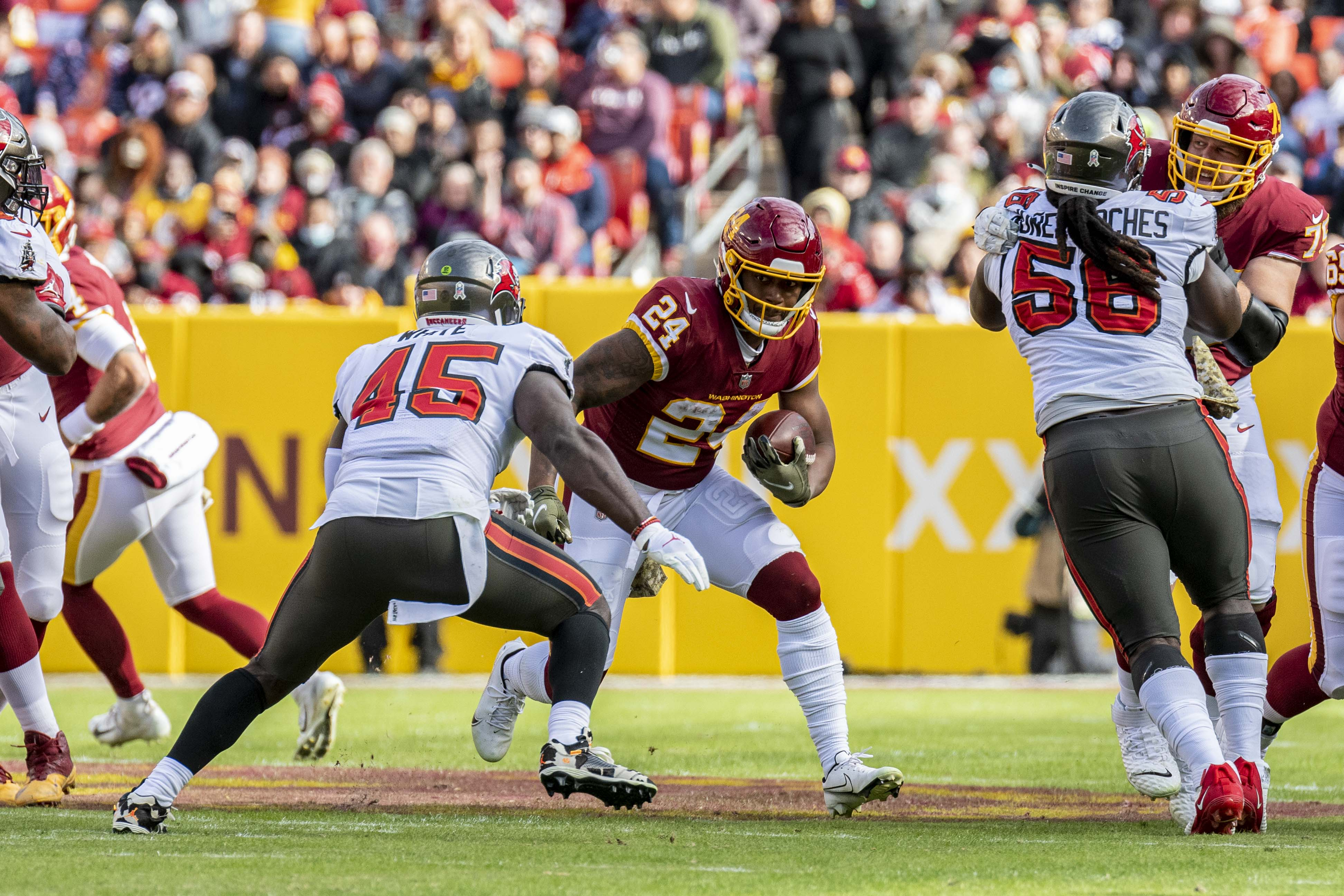
White (#45) playing against the Washington Football Team in 2021.

White made his postseason debut in the Divisional Round against the New Orleans Saints. During the game, White led the team with 11 tackles (10 solo), deflected one pass, recovered a fumble forced by teammate Antoine Winfield Jr., and intercepted a pass by Drew Brees as the Buccaneers defeated the Saints 30–20. In the NFC Championship against the Packers, White led the Buccaneers with 15 tackles (nine solo) and recovered a fumble forced by teammate Jordan Whitehead as the Buccaneers defeated the Packers 31–26 to advance to Super Bowl LV. In the Super Bowl against the Kansas City Chiefs, White recorded 12 tackles, two tackles for loss, and the game sealing interception off a pass thrown by Patrick Mahomes in the end zone to secure a 31–9 victory for the Buccaneers. He was ranked 28th by his fellow players on the NFL Top 100 Players of 2021.

==== 2021 season ====
In the 2021 season, White had 3.5 sacks, 128 total tackles (87 solo), three passes defended, and one fumble recovery. He earned his first Pro Bowl nomination. He was ranked 64th by his fellow players on the NFL Top 100 Players of 2022.

==== 2022 season ====
On April 27, 2022, the Buccaneers exercised the fifth-year option on White's contract. He was named NFC Defensive Player of the Month for September. In Week 10, White had nine tackles, two sacks, a forced fumble and recovery in a 21-16 win over the Seattle Seahawks, earning NFC Defensive Player of the Week. He finished the 2022 season with 5.5 sacks, 124 total tackles (73 solo), five passes defended, two forced fumbles, and three fumble recoveries.

==== 2023 season ====
During the 2023 offseason, White requested a trade from the Buccaneers after failing to negotiate a contract extension. He finished the 2023 season with 2.5 sacks, 83 total tackles (49 solo), two interceptions, and six passes defended.

=== Philadelphia Eagles ===
On March 18, 2024, the Philadelphia Eagles signed White to a one-year, $7.5 million contract. On October 8, he was released, having never played a snap for the team.

=== Houston Texans ===
On October 23, 2024, White was signed by the Houston Texans. He appeared in seven games in the 2024 season.

=== Las Vegas Raiders ===
On March 28, 2025, White signed with the Las Vegas Raiders. That year, he set a Raiders franchise record for most tackles in a season. He finished the 2025 season with 2.5 sacks, 174 total tackles (95 solo), one interception, and three passes defended.

=== Detroit Lions ===
On August 1, 2026, White signed with the Detroit Lions on a one-year contract. On October 16, White was placed on injured reserve.

== Career statistics ==
=== NFL ===
Legend
	Won the Super Bowl
**Bold**	Career high

==== Regular season ====
Year	Team	Games		Tackles						Interceptions						Fumbles			
Year	Team	GP	GS	Cmb	Solo	Ast	Sck	TFL	Sfty	PD	Int	Yds	Avg	Lng	TD	FF	FR	Yds	TD
2019	TB	13	13	91	58	33	2.5	4	0	3	1	5	5.0	5	0	**3**	**4**	**112**	**2**
2020	TB	15	15	140	**97**	43	**9.0**	**15**	0	4	0	0	0.0	0	0	1	1	2	0
2021	TB	17	17	128	87	41	3.5	8	0	3	0	0	0.0	0	0	0	1	5	0
2022	TB	17	17	124	73	51	5.5	8	0	5	0	0	0.0	0	0	2	3	26	0
2023	TB	14	13	83	49	34	2.5	5	0	**6**	**2**	**36**	**18.0**	**26**	0	0	0	0	0
2024	HOU	7	1	19	15	4	0.0	0	0	0	0	0	0.0	0	0	0	0	0	0
2025	LV	17	17	**174**	95	**79**	2.5	11	0	3	1	0	0.0	0	0	1	0	0	0
2026	DET	3	3	10	4	6	0.0	0	0	0	0	0	0.0	0	0	0	0	0	0
Total		103	96	769	478	291	25.5	51	0	24	4	41	10.3	26	0	7	9	145	2

==== Postseason ====
Year	Team	Games		Tackles						Interceptions						Fumbles			
Year	Team	GP	GS	Cmb	Solo	Ast	Sck	TFL	Sfty	PD	Int	Yds	Avg	Lng	TD	FF	FR	Yds	TD
2020	TB	3	3	**38**	**27**	**11**	0.0	**3**	0	**2**	**2**	**28**	**14.0**	**28**	0	0	**2**	**39**	0
2021	TB	2	2	13	7	6	0.0	2	0	**2**	0	0	0.0	0	0	0	0	0	0
2022	TB	1	1	5	2	3	0.0	1	0	0	0	0	0.0	0	0	0	0	0	0
2023	TB	2	0	3	0	3	0.0	0	0	0	0	0	0.0	0	0	0	0	0	0
Total		8	6	59	36	23	0.0	6	0	4	2	28	14.0	28	0	0	2	39	0

=== College ===
Season	Team	GP	Tackles					Interceptions					Fumbles			
Season	Team	GP	Solo	Ast	Cmb	TfL	Sck	Int	Yds	Avg	TD	PD	FR	Yds	TD	FF
2016	LSU	8	15	15	30	3.0	1.0	0	0	0.0	0	0	1	0	0	1
2017	LSU	13	37	96	133	13.5	4.5	1	3	3.0	0	3	0	0	0	0
2018	LSU	13	62	61	123	12.0	3.0	0	0	0.0	0	6	2	0	0	3
Career		34	114	172	286	28.5	8.5	1	3	3.0	0	9	3	0	0	4

== Career highlights ==
=== Awards and honors ===
NFL

- Super Bowl champion (LV)
- Second-team All-Pro (2020)
- Pro Bowl (2021)
- PFWA All-Rookie Team (2019)
- 2× NFL Top 100 — 28th (2021), 64th (2022)

College

- Butkus Award (2018)
- Consensus All-American (2018)
- Second-team All-American (2017)
- 2× First-team All-SEC (2017, 2018)
- SEC All-Freshman Team (2016)

=== Records ===
==== Buccaneers franchise records ====
- Most forced fumbles in a single game – 2 (tied) (November 3, 2019 against the Seattle Seahawks)
- Longest fumble return touchdown – 91 yards (December 29, 2019 against the Atlanta Falcons)
- Most fumbles recovered by a rookie in a season – 4
- Most fumbles returned for a touchdown in a season – 2 (2019)
- Most defensive touchdowns by a rookie in a season – 2

==== Raiders franchise records ====
- Most tackles in a single season — 174 (2025)

== Personal life ==
White is a Christian. White is the younger cousin of retired NFL running back Charcandrick West.
