= Jack Montgomery (politician) =

American politician (born 1936)

Jack Montgomery (born John W. Montgomery, June 2, 1936, Louisiana) is an American lawyer and politician in the Democratic Party.

Montgomery grew up in Springhill, Louisiana where he graduated from Springhill High School. He earned degrees from Tulane University and the Louisiana State University School of Law. He spent three years working as a lawyer for the United States Air Force. He defeated senator Harold Montgomery in the 1967 election for Louisiana's 36th State Senate district; serving in the Louisiana State Senate from 1968–1972. After leaving politics he worked as a defense attorney in Minden, Louisiana. He was still practicing law as late as 2014 when he was employed as Minden's Assistant District Attorney.
