= Donnie Stone =

American football player (born 1937)

No. 94, 24, 34, 32, 36
- Position: Running back

Personal information
- Born: January 5, 1937 (age 89); Sioux City, Iowa, U.S.
- Listed height: 6 ft 1 in (1.85 m)
- Listed weight: 205 lb (93 kg)

Career information
- High school: Fayetteville (Fayetteville, Arkansas)
- College: Arkansas
- NFL draft: 1959: 21st round, 249th overall pick

Career history
- Calgary Stampeders (1959–1961); Denver Broncos (1961–1964); Buffalo Bills (1965); Houston Oilers (1966)

Awards and highlights
- AFL All-Star (1961); Second-team All-SWC (1957)

Career AFL statistics
- Rushing yards: 1,352
- Rushing average: 3.8
- Receptions: 91
- Receiving yards: 859
- Total touchdowns: 16
- Stats at Pro Football Reference

Edward Donald Stone (born January 5, 1937) is an American former professional football player who was a running back in the American Football League (AFL). He played college football for the Arkansas Razorbacks. He played professionally in the AFL for the Denver Broncos from 1961 through 1964, and then the Buffalo Bills and Houston Oilers. He was an AFL All-Star in 1961.

== See also ==
- List of American Football League players
