= 1956 All-Southwest Conference football team =

American college football all-star team

The 1956 All-Southwest Conference football team consists of American football players chosen by various organizations for All-Southwest Conference teams for the 1956 college football season. The selectors for the 1956 season included the Associated Press (AP) and the United Press (UP). Players selected as first-team players by both the AP and UP are designated in bold.

== All Southwest selections ==
=== Backs ===
- **Roddy Osborne**, Texas A&M (AP-1; UP-1 [QB])
- **Jim Swink**, TCU (AP-1; UP-1 [HB])
- **John David Crow**, Texas A&M (AP-1; UP-1 [HB]) (1957 Heisman Trophy winner; College Football Hall of Fame)
- **Jack Pardee**, Texas A&M (AP-1; UP-1 [FB])
- Gerald Nesbitt, Arkansas (AP-1; UP-2)
- Chuck Curtis, TCU (AP-2; UP-2)
- Del Shofner, Baylor (AP-2; UP-2)
- Walter Fondren, Texas (AP-2; UP-2)
- King Hill, Rice (AP-2)

=== Ends ===
- **Tommy Gentry**, SMU (AP-1; UP-1)
- O'Day Williams, TCU (AP-2; UP-1)
- Jerry Marcontell, Baylor (AP-1)
- Earl Miller, Baylor (AP-2)
- Bob Bryant, Texas (UP-2)
- John Tracey, Texas A&M (UP-2)

=== Tackles ===
- **Charlie Krueger**, Texas A&M (AP-1; UP-1)
- **Norman Hamilton**, TCU (AP-1; UP-1)
- Billy Ray Smith Sr., Arkansas (AP-1; UP-2)
- Larry Whitmire, Rice (AP-2; UP-2)
- Bob Blakeley, SMU (AP-2)

=== Guards ===
- **Bill Glass**, Baylor (AP-1; UP-1)
- Dennis Goehring, Texas A&M (AP-2; UP-1)
- Smitty Keller, SMU (AP-2; UP-2)
- Joe Williams, TCU (UP-2)

=== Centers ===
- **Lloyd Hale**, Texas A&M (AP-1; UP-1)
- Jay Donathan, Arkansas (AP-2; UP-2)

== Key ==
AP = Associated Press

UP = United Press

Bold = Consensus first-team selection of both the AP and UP

== See also ==
- 1956 College Football All-America Team
