= Harold Montgomery =

American politician (1911–1995)

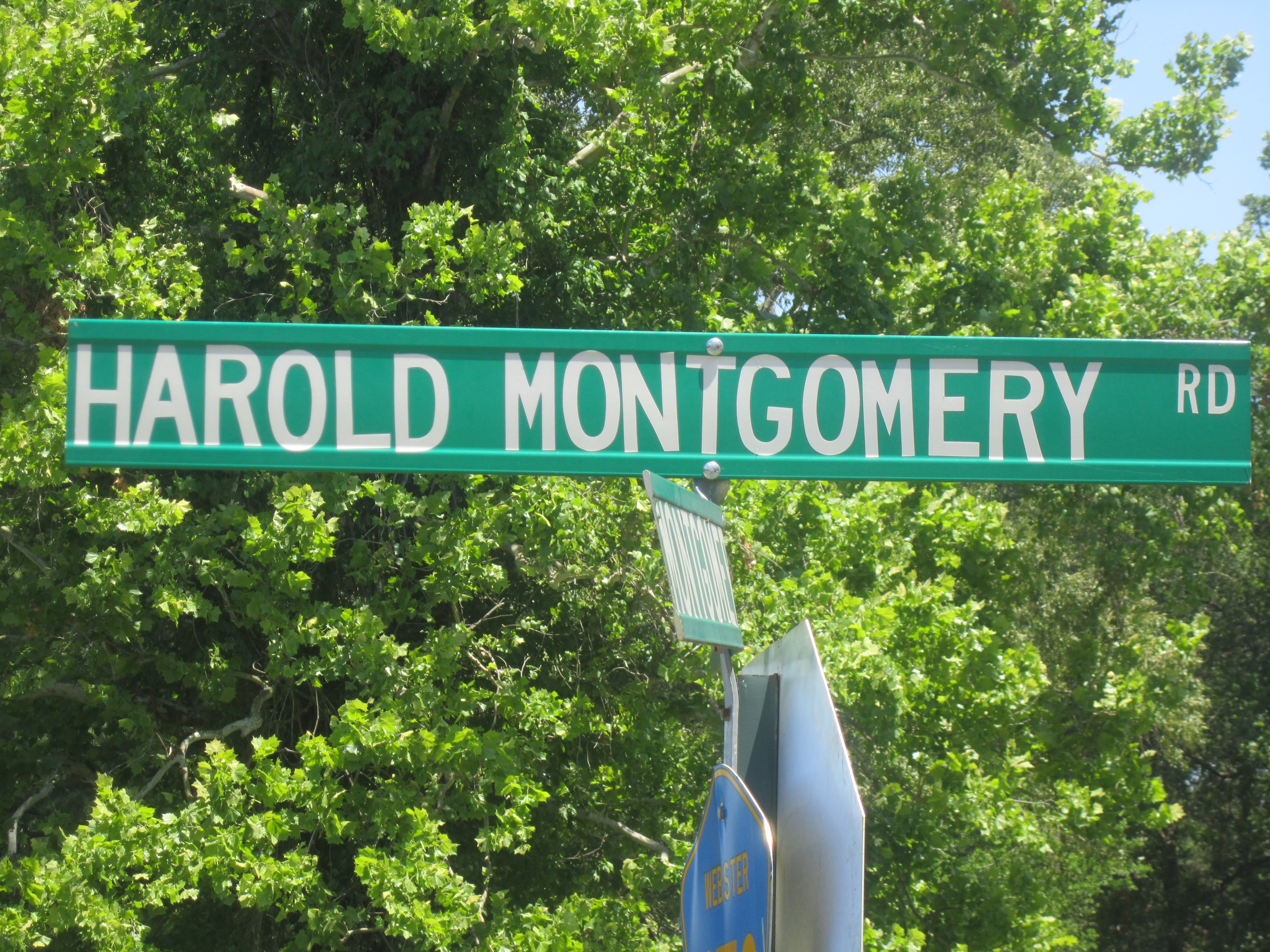
Road sign for Harold Montgomery Rd. in Webster Parish; named for the politician.

Harold Montgomery Sr. (April 19, 1911 - December 17, 1995) was an American politician, businessman, farmer, and educator. Born in Texas and raised in Bossier Parish, Louisiana, he graduated with from the University of Arkansas with undergraduate and graduate degrees in agriculture. He began his career as a high school science educator in the 1930s before transitioning into work as an agricultural businessman and farmer. He was elected three times to Louisiana's 36th State Senate district; serving as a senator in the Louisiana State Senate from 1960-1968, and again from 1972-1976. He was a Conservative Democrat.

== Life and career ==
The son of Alley C. Montgomery and Martha Belle Montgomery, A. Harold Montgomery was born in Humble, Texas on April 19, 1911. He had six sisters and one brother, and grew up in Bossier Parish, Louisiana. He graduated from Benton High School in 1929. He began his studies at the University of Arkansas (UA) in 1930. He studied agriculture at UA and represented the college at a national livestock and dairy products competition in which he placed second at the 1933 Chicago World's Fair. He graduated from UA with a Bachelor of Science degree in agriculture in 1934. He later earned a master's degree in the same subject from UA.

Montgomery began his career as a science educator at first Haughton High School and then Ruston High School; working in that capacity through 1939. When he married Azalee Wilson in 1945 he was employed by the Louisiana Board of Elementary and Secondary Education. He concurrently owned and operated Montgomery's Feed and Seed; an agricultural supply business he established in Ruston, Louisiana. He subsequently expanded into the poultry industry and was involved in developing Yazoo Master Mower for which he was one of the backing investors. In 1953 he moved with his wife and son, Harold Montgomery Jr., to Doyline, Louisiana where he purchased a 1,365 acre farm which he named Ranch Azalee after his wife.

In October 1955 Montgomery chaired a regional meeting of the Eisenhower administration's Whitehouse Conference on Education held at Northeast Louisiana State College just days before announcing his candidacy for Louisiana's 36th State Senate district. He lost the 1956 election to Herman "Wimpy" Jones, but was successfully elected to Louisiana's 36th State Senate district in 1960 and again in 1964; serving as a state senator from 1960 through 1968. He lost a re-election bid in 1968 to senator Jack Montgomery. He was successfully elected again to the same post in 1972, and retired from politics after finishing that term in 1976. He was a member of the Democratic Party, but was known for acting independently of the political machine in Louisiana. He was considered politically and socially Conservative Democrat.

Montgomery died in Doyline on December 17, 1995 at the age of 84. In his later life he suffered from Alzheimer's disease.

== External libks ==
- A. Harold Montgomery Findagrave page
