= Mike Stratton =

American football player (1941–2020)

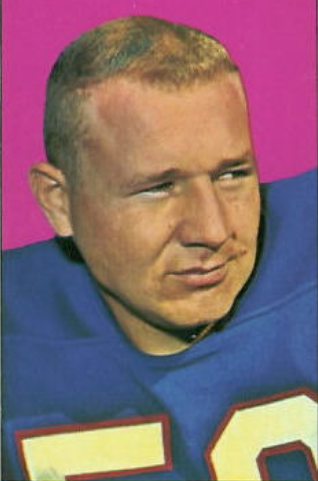
- Statton on a Topps card, 1965

No. 58
- Position: Linebacker

Personal information
- Born: April 10, 1941; Vonore, Tennessee, U.S.
- Died: March 25, 2020 (aged 78); Knoxville, Tennessee, U.S.
- Listed height: 6 ft 3 in (1.91 m)
- Listed weight: 224 lb (102 kg)

Career information
- High school: Tellico Plains (Tellico Plains, Tennessee)
- College: Tennessee
- AFL draft: 1962: 13th round, 100th overall pick

Career history
- Buffalo Bills (1962–1972); San Diego Chargers (1973)

Awards and highlights
- 2× AFL champion (1964, 1965); 6× AFL All-Star (1963–1968); AFL All-Time Second Team; Buffalo Bills Wall of Fame; Buffalo Bills 50th Anniversary Team

Career statistics
- Quarterback sacks: 31.5
- Interceptions: 21
- Touchdowns: 2
- Stats at Pro Football Reference

David Michael Stratton (April 10, 1941 – March 25, 2020) was an American professional football player who was a linebacker for 12 seasons in the American Football League (AFL) and National Football League (NFL). He won two AFL championships with the Buffalo Bills, where he was a six-time AFL All-Star. He was named to the AFL All-Time Second Team.

Stratton played college football for the Tennessee Volunteers. He played professionally for 11 years with the Bills and spent his final season with the San Diego Chargers. He won two AFL championships with the Bills in 1964 and 1965, with his tackle of Keith Lincoln in the former game being referred to as “The Hit Heard ‘Round the World”. His contributions as a team leader of a defense that allowed just seven points each in consecutive championship games as resulted in him being called one of the best defensive players in Bills history.

== Early life ==
Stratton attended Tellico Plains High in Tellico Plains, Tennessee, a hamlet in the Great Smoky Mountains region. Football players there did not attract college recruiters, and Tellico Plains athletes rarely went to college. Stratton played tackle, fullback and wingback.

Stratton received a scholarship from Volunteers coach Bowden Wyatt to play at the University of Tennessee. He was a two-way player with Tennessee, playing tight end on offense and defensive end on defense.

== Professional career ==
Drafted out of college by the Buffalo Bills in the 13th round of the 1962 AFL draft, Stratton was selected as an AFL All-Star six straight seasons from 1963 through 1968. Bills coach Lou Saban teamed him with Harry Jacobs and John Tracey to form one of the best linebacking crews, playing together for 62 consecutive games from 1963 through 1967, a pro football record. They helped the Bills defense hold opposing teams without a 100-yard rusher for seventeen consecutive games in 1964 and 1965, capturing AFL championships in both years.

In the 1964 AFL Championship Game against the San Diego Chargers, Stratton made the memorable "hit heard 'round the world". San Diego's Keith Lincoln had a 38-yard run on the game's opening play. The Chargers were leading 7–0 when Stratton drove his shoulder into Lincoln's midsection, breaking the star running back's ribs and knocking him out of the game. The Bills shut out San Diego for the rest of the game, and won 20–7. In the closing minutes of the first half with Buffalo leading 13–7, the Chargers drove to the Bills' 15, but Stratton intercepted a Tobin Rote pass to end the threat. Rote and San Diego coach Sid Gillman called the turnover a decisive play. The combined efforts of players such as defensive tackle Tom Sestak, cornerback Butch Byrd, and others led to two Bills championships, where they allowed seven points in each contest.

Stratton played 11 seasons for the Bills before ending his career with the Chargers in 1973. He finished his career with 21 interceptions—18 with the Bills and 3 with the Chargers. He was selected to the AFL All-Time Second Team.

== Later life ==
After football, Stratton became an executive with insurance company Crump Associates in Knoxville, Tennessee. He and his wife raised three daughters and one son. The son died in 2023.

On March 25, 2020, Stratton died at age 78 from heart complications after a recent fall.

== See also ==
- List of American Football League players
