= Gerald Nesbitt =

American gridiron football player (1932–2023)

Profile
- Position: Halfback

Personal information
- Born: March 3, 1932; Big Sandy, Texas, U.S.
- Died: April 27, 2023 (aged 91); Little Rock, Arkansas, U.S.
- Listed height: 5 ft 10 in (1.78 m)
- Listed weight: 200 lb (91 kg)

Career information
- High school: Big Sandy (TX)
- College: Arkansas
- NFL draft: 1956: 27th round, 321st overall pick

Career history
- 1958–1961: Ottawa Rough Riders

Awards and highlights
- Grey Cup champion (1960); 2× First-team All-SWC (1956, 1957)

Gerald Nelson Nesbitt (March 3, 1932 – April 27, 2023) was a USMC Korean War Veteran and an American Canadian football player who played for the Ottawa Rough Riders. He won the Grey Cup with them in 1960. He played college football for the University of Arkansas Razorbacks.

Nesbitt died in Little Rock, Arkansas, on April 27, 2023, at the age of 91.
