= Five Days from Home =

1979 film by George Peppard

- Theatrical release poster
- Directed by: George Peppard
- Written by: William Moore
- Produced by: George Peppard
- Starring: George Peppard; Neville Brand; Savannah Smith
- Cinematography: Harvey Genkins
- Edited by: Samuel E. Beetley
- Music by: Bill Conti
- Production company: Long Rifle Productions
- Distributed by: Universal Pictures
- Release date: April 21, 1978
- Running time: 108 minutes
- Country: United States
- Language: English
- Budget: $1 million
- Box office: $641,768 (US)

Five Days from Home is a 1978 American drama film directed, produced and starring George Peppard, with Sherry Boucher, Savannah Smith, Neville Brand, Victor Campos, and Robert Donner.

== Plot ==
T.M. Pryor, a former cop, escapes from a prison in Louisiana where he is currently serving out a sentence for killing his wife's lover. Despite the fact that his parole hearing is only two weeks away Pryor is desperate to be at his son's hospital bedside. His nine-year-old son, Thomas, was injured in an automobile accident in Los Angeles and is in critical condition. Just days before Christmas, Pryor hits a prison guard, escapes and heads for the Louisiana swamps. Avoiding the tracking teams assisted by dogs, Pryor makes it to the highway where he hitches a farm truck ride to the nearest town. In town he breaks into a sporting goods store where he takes two firearms and ammo, a knife and hunting clothing leaving an IOU note in lieu of payment. Over the radio he gets the latest news and learns that someone has killed the prison guard who tried to prevent his escape from prison. It's obvious that someone is trying to pin the prison murder on him and frame him. Meanwhile, Louisiana's governor assigns Pryor's escape case to Inspector Markley, a tracking specialist. Inspector Markley decides to start the pursuit in Texas, on a hunch that Pryor might be heading that way in order to reach California. Things get even more complicated when Pryor starts carjacking people and taking hostages in his obsessive aim to reach his injured son in Los Angeles before Christmas.

== Cast ==
- Sherry Boucher as Wanda Dulac
- Neville Brand as Inspector Markley
- Victor Campos as Jose Stover
- Robert Donner as Karl Baldwin
- Ronnie Claire Edwards as Marian Lemoore
- Jessie Lee Fulton as Mrs. Peabody
- William Larsen as J. J. Bester
- Robert Magruder as The Colonel
- George Peppard as T. M. Pryor
- Savannah Smith Boucher as 'Georgie' Haskin

== Production ==
In November 1977 Peppard announced he wanted to direct and star in The Long Escape. "Directing is something I've wanted to do a long time," he said.

Peppard later said he decided to direct because "I couldn't hire anyone else as cheaply" and says the experience "somehow cleared my head of all the negative feelings I had towards acting."

Peppard made the film with much of his own money. He later stated that it cost $1 million to produce. "I'm quite proud of it," he said in 1979. "I sold many assets to help make it but I don't mind. It was the best time of my life. Maybe it would have been a better film with a better script - I don't know - but I just didn't have any money to spare." He later said he disliked acting and directing at the same time.

Peppard said he wrote most of the script but did not take credit. "That would be too much of an ego trip."

His then wife Sherry Boucher played a small role and Boucher's sister Savannah was cast as Peppard's love interest.

In December 1977 the film was sold to Universal, by which time Peppard and Boucher were separated. This was attributed to the stress of making the movie.

Peppard said he sold the film for $1,250,000, thus allowing him to repay his investors within nine months of the sale. It was a more artistic effort than most of his appearances in the 1970s.

== Release ==
The film received a regional release on April 21, 1978, opening in eight cities in Arizona, Louisiana and Mississippi before expanding into Southern and Central states before opening in Los Angeles on March 9, 1979.

== Critical reception ==
The Los Angeles Times said the film was "calculated to warm the cockles of every heart in sight... pleasantly insignificant".

== Legacy ==
Bill Conti's love theme Come With Me Now was the inspiration to the theme tune to Lifestyles of the Rich and Famous, hosted by Robin Leach. It had also been used as one of the theme songs for local morning program AM Los Angeles on KABC-TV.
