= Benton High School (Louisiana) =

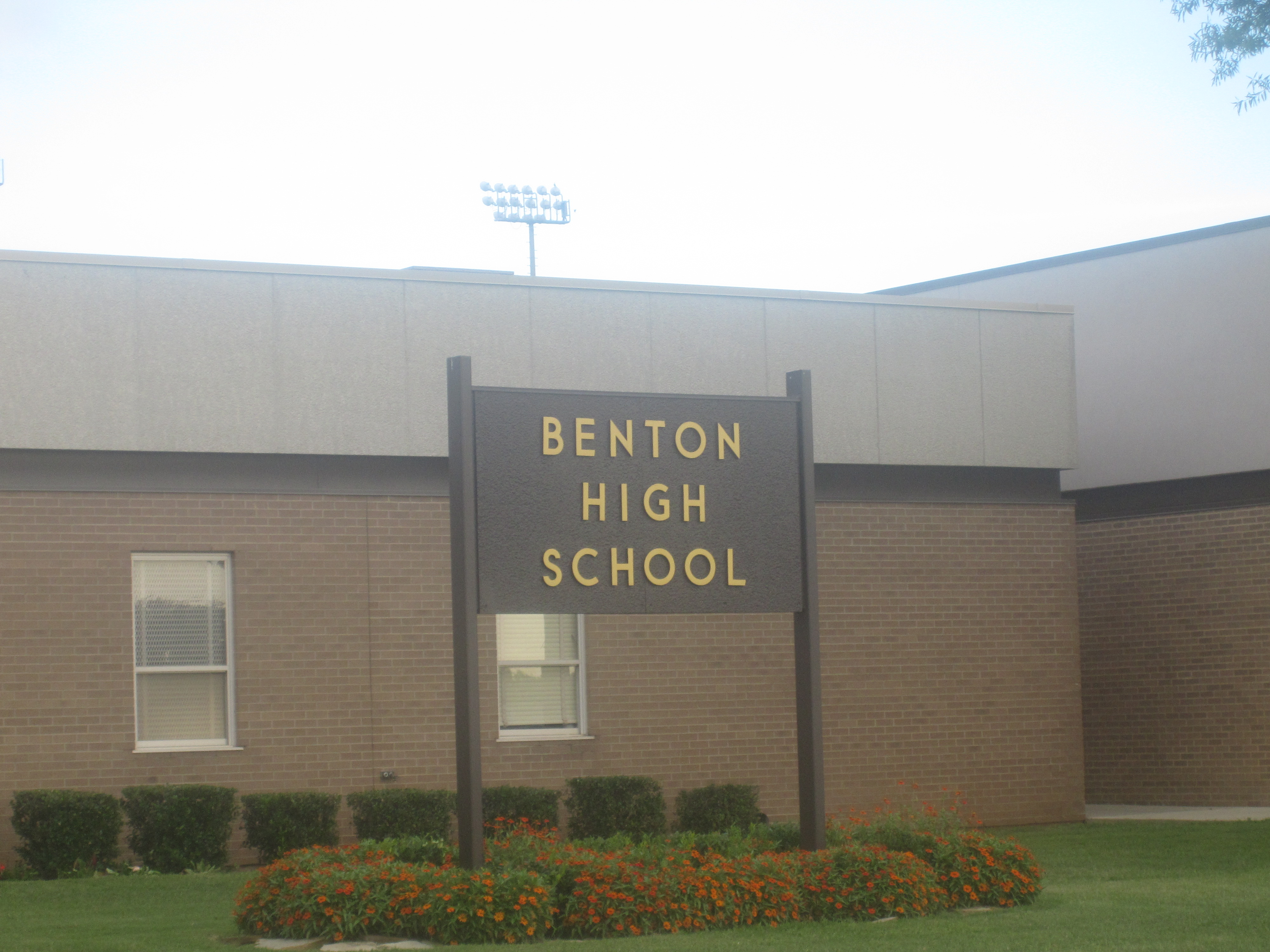
- Benton High School

Location
- 449 Fairburn Avenue; Bossier City, Louisiana 71111; United States; 32.66589°N 93.74655°W

Information
- Type: Public
- School district: Bossier Parish School Board
- Principal: Main: Whitney Clark
- Staff: 88.33 (on an FTE basis)
- Grades: 9 to 12
- Enrollment: 1,568 (2023-2024)
- Student to teacher ratio: 17.75
- Colors: Purple and gold
- Athletics conference: LHSAA
- Mascot: Tiger
- Nickname: Tigers
- Yearbook: Shere Khan
- Website: www.bentonhighschool.com

Benton High School is a public high school located in Benton, Louisiana, United States. The school, part of Bossier Parish School Board, serves about 1200 students in grades 9 to 12.

== History ==
The first school was built in 1890, and the current school was opened in 1978. Benton High School opened its new campus fall 2019.

== Athletics ==
Benton High School is a member of the Louisiana High School Athletic Association in the highest classification, 5A, moving up from 4A for the 2019–20 school year.

== Notable alumni ==
- Walter O. Bigby (Class of 1944), member of the Louisiana House of Representatives (1968–1979); thereafter a judge until his death
- Harold Montgomery (Class of 1929), member of the Louisiana State Senate (1960–1968 & 1972–1976)
