= Sherry Boucher =

American actress (born July 25, 1945)

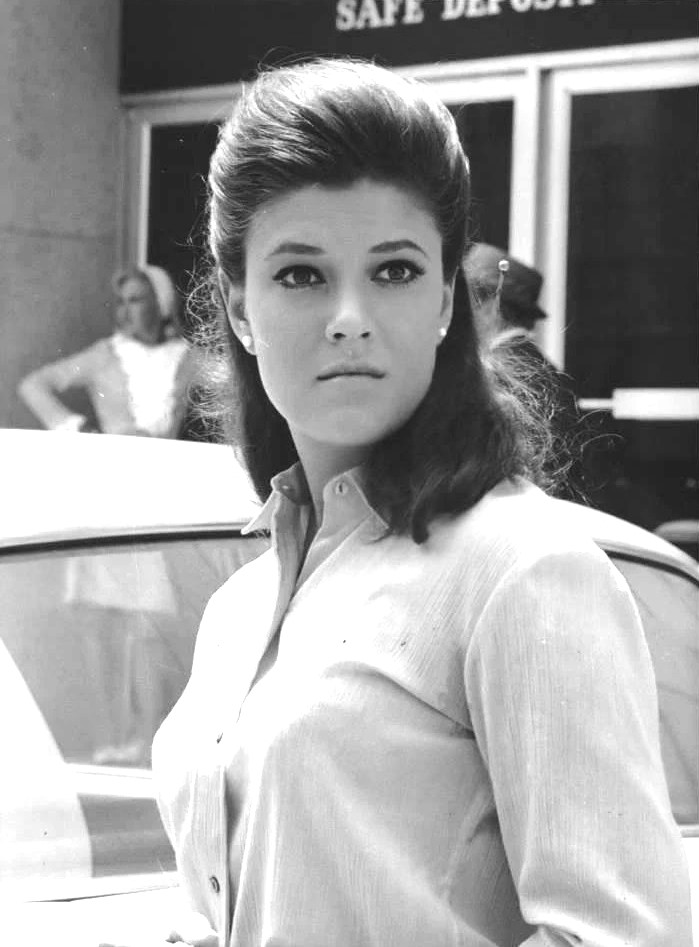
- Born: Sherry Lynn Boucher; July 25, 1945 (age 81); Springhill, Louisiana, U.S.
- Occupation: Actress
- Spouses: George Peppard (m. 1975; div. 1979) John R. Lytle (divorced)
- Children: 1
- Relatives: Savannah Smith Boucher (sister)

Sherry Lynn Boucher (also known as Sherry Boucher Peppard or Sherry Boucher-Lytle; born July 25, 1945) is a former American actress. She currently works as a realtor.

== Partial filmography ==
- Prescription: Murder (TV movie – 1968) as Air Hostess
- White Lightning (1973) as Sherry Lynne
- Sisters of Death (1976) as Diane
- Five Days from Home (1978) as Wanda Dulac
- Eating (1990) as Mary
