= Savannah Smith Boucher =

American actress (born 1943)

- Born: Janice Elaine Boucher; October 28, 1943 (age 81); Springhill, Louisiana, U.S.
- Occupation: Employee Boucher & Slack Home Center Springhill Louisiana Officer
- Spouse(s): Ronnie Wayne Campbell and William J. Stover
- Children: Sherrie LeAnne Campbell
- Parent(s): Jesse L. Boucher and Mary Eloise H Boucher

Savannah Smith Boucher (born October 28, 1943), known professionally as Savannah Smith before 1985, is an American actress originally from Springhill, Louisiana. Her younger sister, Sherry Boucher, is a former actress who was the third wife of actor George Peppard.

== Extended Family ==
Boucher is descended from a line of Louisiana Democratic politicians. Her mayor-father’s first cousin, Drayton Boucher, was a member of both houses of the Louisiana State Legislature, having served from 1936 to 1952. Her maternal uncle, John D. Herrington, also served as Springhill mayor — from 1978–86, and again from 1995-2006. as of 2004.

== Partial filmography ==
- Five Days from Home (1978) as 'Georgie' Haskin
- North Dallas Forty (1979) as Joanne Rodney
- The Long Riders (1980) as Zee
- The Oklahoma City Dolls (TV movie, 1981) as Darla Guthrie
- Waltz Across Texas (1982) as Molesta Davis
- Sweet Revenge (TV Movie - 1984) as Anne Haggarty Cheever
- Love on the Run (TV movie, 1985) as Martha
- Odd Jobs (1986) as Loretta & Lynette
- Everybody's All-American (1988) as Darlene Kiely
- Meet the Applegates (1990) as Dottie
- Eating (1990) as Eloise
- The Whereabouts of Jenny (TV movie, 1991)
- Fatal Instinct (1993) as Woman Juror
- Last Summer in the Hamptons (1995) as Suzanne
- Graduation Night (2003) as Mrs. Quigley
- Nursie (2004) as Ada
