= Cullen, Louisiana =

- Town
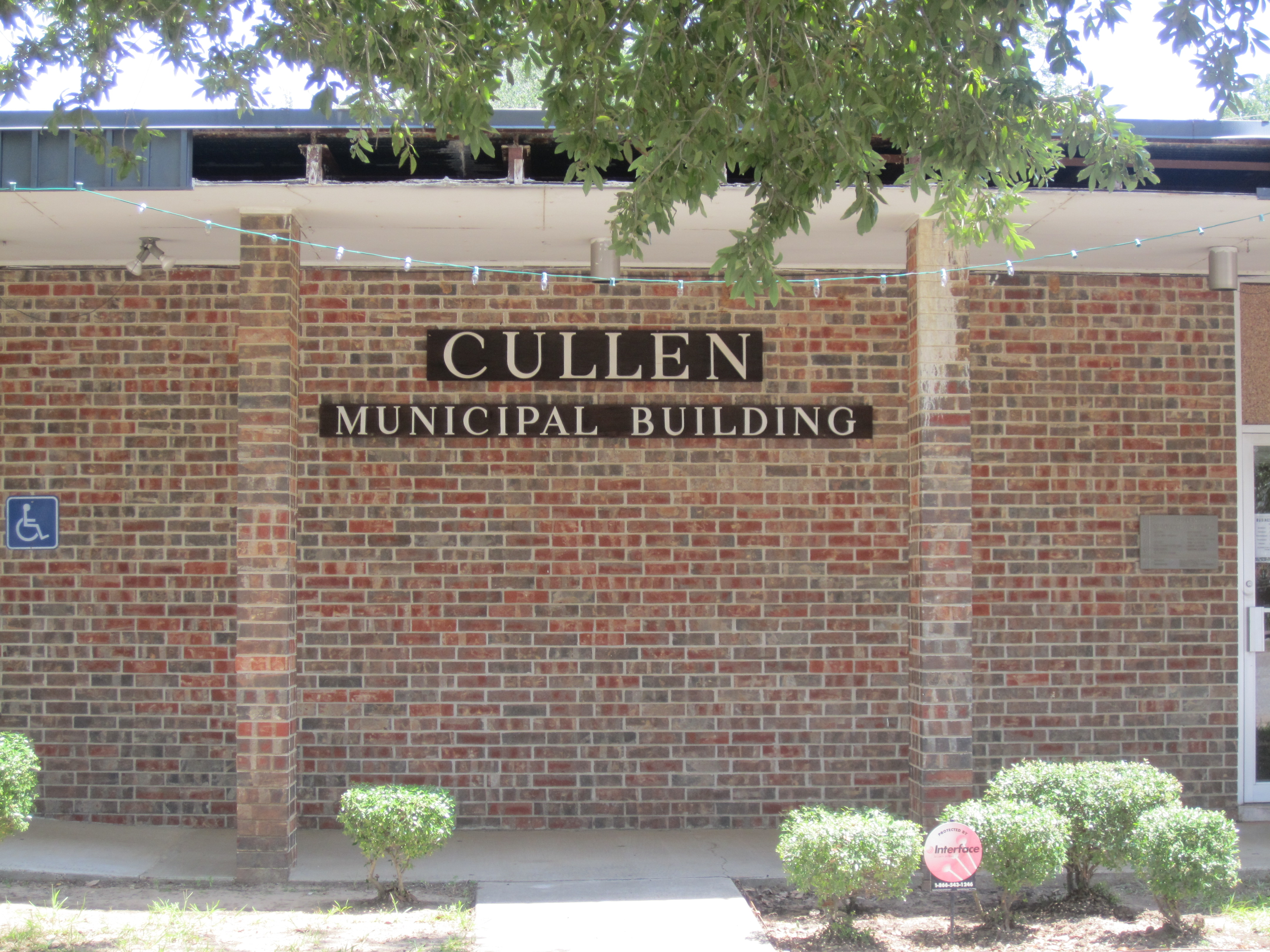
- Cullen Municipal Building

- Location of Cullen in Webster Parish, Louisiana.

- Location of Louisiana in the United States
- Coordinates: 32°58′11″N 93°26′47″W
- Country: United States
- State: Louisiana
- Parish: Webster

Area
  - Total: 1.16 sq mi (3.00 km^{2})
  - Land: 1.15 sq mi (2.99 km^{2})
  - Water: 0.0077 sq mi (0.02 km^{2})
- Elevation: 236 ft (72 m)

Population (2020)
  - Total: 716
  - Density: 621.0/sq mi (239.78/km^{2})
- Time zone: UTC-6 (CST)
  - Summer (DST): UTC-5 (CDT)
- Area code: 318
- FIPS code: 22-18790
- GNIS feature ID: 2406345

Cullen is a town just south of Springhill in northern Webster Parish, Louisiana, United States. As of the 2020 census, Cullen had a population of 716. It is part of the Minden Micropolitan Statistical Area.

Bobby Ray Washington, the former mayor of Cullen, served as president and vice president of the Louisiana Municipal Association. He resigned from office when questions arose about his residency in Shreveport. Washington was succeeded in March 2012 by Dexter Turner, a former police detective in Springhill. Turner was elected to a full term as mayor in December 2012 and died on March 22, 2013, of an apparent heart attack at the age of forty-nine.

Cullen has a restored Kansas City Southern Railroad museum located across from the International Paper Company container plant.

In 2011, Ricky L. Thomas reactivated the Ludwig Ball Park, which had been constructed in 1968 for baseball and softball. After many years of neglect the park was restored and a reunion was held in July 2011; all former ball players were invited. At the reunion Thomas presented Coach Billy Dubois a framed picture of his Louisiana-Arkansas All Star team. KTBS, the ABC affiliate in Shreveport, aired a story about Ludwig Ball Park.

== Geography ==
According to the United States Census Bureau, the town has a total area of 1.2 square miles (3.1 km^{2}), all land.

== Demographics ==
Historical population
Census	Pop.	Note	%±
1960	2,194		—
1970	1,956		−10.8%
1980	1,869		−4.4%
1990	1,642		−12.1%
2000	1,296		−21.1%
2010	1,163		−10.3%
2020	716		−38.4%
2025 (est.)	676	▼	−5.6%
U.S. Decennial Census

Cullen racial composition as of 2020
Race	Number	Percentage
White (non-Hispanic)	76	10.61%
Black or African American (non-Hispanic)	619	86.45%
Other/Mixed	11	1.54%
Hispanic or Latino	10	1.4%

As of the 2020 United States census, there were 716 people, 552 households, and 295 families residing in the town.
