= John David Crow =

American football player, coach, and administrator (1935–2015)

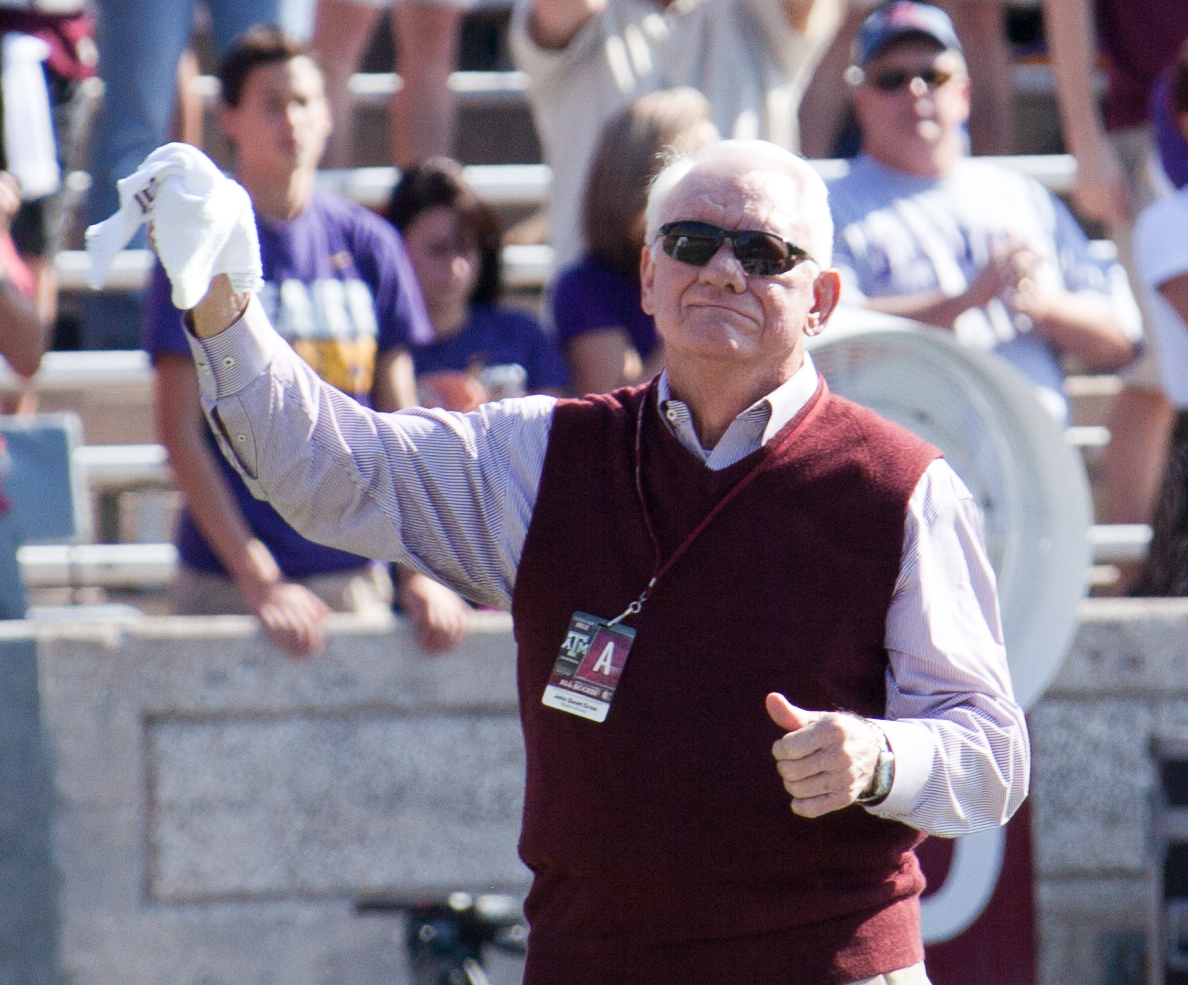
- Crow at Kyle Field in 2012

No. 44
- Positions: Halfback, tight end

Personal information
- Born: July 8, 1935; Marion, Louisiana, U.S.
- Died: June 17, 2015 (aged 79); Bryan, Texas, U.S.
- Listed height: 6 ft 2 in (1.88 m)
- Listed weight: 220 lb (100 kg)

Career information
- High school: Springhill (Springhill, Louisiana)
- College: Texas A&M (1955–1957)
- NFL draft: 1958: 1st round, 2nd overall pick

Career history

Playing
- Chicago / St. Louis Cardinals (1958–1964); San Francisco 49ers (1965–1968)

Coaching
- Alabama (1969–1971) Offensive backfield coach; Cleveland Browns (1972–1973) Offensive backfield coach; San Diego Chargers (1974–1975) Offensive coordinator; Northeast Louisiana (1976–1980) Head coach

Operations
- Northeast Louisiana (1975–1981) Athletic director; Texas A&M (1983–1988) Assistant athletic director; Texas A&M (1988–1993) Athletic director

Awards and highlights
- 2× First-team All-Pro (1959, 1960); Second-team All-Pro (1962); 4× Pro Bowl (1959, 1960, 1962, 1965); NFL 1960s All-Decade Team; Heisman Trophy (1957); UPI Player of the Year (1957); SN Player of the Year (1957); Chic Harley Award (1957); Unanimous All-American (1957); First-team All-American (1956); 2× First-team All-SWC (1956, 1957)

Career NFL statistics
- Rushing yards: 4,963
- Rushing average: 4.3
- Rushing touchdowns: 38
- Receptions: 258
- Receiving yards: 3,699
- Receiving touchdowns: 35
- Stats at Pro Football Reference

Head coaching record
- Career: 20–34–1 (.373)
- Coaching profile at Pro Football Reference
- College Football Hall of Fame

John David Crow Sr. (July 8, 1935 – June 17, 2015) was an American professional football player, coach, and college athletics administrator. He won the Heisman Trophy in 1957 as a halfback playing for the Texas A&M Aggies. After college, he played in the National Football League (NFL) for the Chicago / St. Louis Cardinals and the San Francisco 49ers from 1958 to 1968.

After his playing career, Crow became an assistant football coach for the Alabama Crimson Tide football team of the University of Alabama, serving under coach Bear Bryant from 1969 to 1971 He moved to the NFL as an assistant with the Cleveland Browns in 1972, and then the San Diego Chargers in 1974. In December 1975, Crow was hired as head football coach and athletic director at Northeast Louisiana University—now the University of Louisiana at Monroe. He coached the football team for five seasons, from 1976 to 1980, compiling a record of 20–34–1. He remained as athletic director until 1981. Crow returned to his alma mater, Texas A&M, in 1983 as an assistant athletic director. He was promoted to athletic director in 1988 and served in that capacity until 1993.

Crow was inducted into the College Football Hall of Fame as a player in 1976. A street on the campus of Texas A&M University adjacent to Kyle Field is named after him.

In 2009 Erle and Alice Nye commissioned a twice life size bronze statue of Crow, and donated the $250,000 monument to Texas A&M University, sculpted by Steven Whyte.

== Early life ==
A native of Marion in Union Parish in North Louisiana, Crow was raised to the west in Springhill in northern Webster Parish near the Arkansas state line. He graduated in 1954 from Springhill High School.

== College career ==
Under coach Bear Bryant at Texas A&M, Crow was not one of the "Junction Boys," since he was a freshman in 1954, Bryant's first season, and was thus ineligible to play on the varsity under NCAA rules at the time. In 1956, Crow was part of the first Aggie football team to beat the University of Texas at Darrell K Royal–Texas Memorial Stadium.

In Crow's senior season in 1957, the Aggies opened with eight wins and were ranked first in the AP poll. The Aggies lost their last three games after uncertainty over whether head coach Bear Bryant would be leaving. Although injured early in the season, Crow was able to play in seven games in his senior season. He rushed for 562 yards on 129 carries, with six touchdowns. Crow also caught two passes and passed for five touchdowns. While playing on defense, he intercepted the ball five times. During the 1957 season, Bryant famously quipped, "If John David Crow doesn't win the Heisman Trophy, they ought to stop giving it."

Crow was named an All-American, and won the Heisman Trophy on December 3 over runner-up Iowa tackle Alex Karras, followed by Michigan State halfback Walt Kowalczyk. Crow claims not to have understood the importance of the award until sponsors flew his family and him to New York City for the presentation. He was the first Aggie to win the Heisman, and he was the only one of Bryant's players to win. Bryant then left for Alabama shortly after Crow received the Heisman.

== Professional career ==
In the 1958 NFL draft, Crow was the second overall pick, selected by the Chicago Cardinals. He played eleven seasons in the NFL and appeared in four Pro Bowls.

In his first season, he played in seven games and rushed 52 times for 221 yards while catching twenty passes for 362 yards; he scored five total touchdowns. He also returned six kicks for 145 yards. Crow's first touchdown occurred in his first game on September 28 when he recovered a fumble in the end zone. The following year, he would improve by playing in twelve games while recording a total of 994 scrimmage yards (666 rushing, 328 receiving) with seven total touchdowns and a Pro Bowl selection.

Crow followed the team to St. Louis in 1960. That year, he had his first and only 1,000 yard rushing season with 1,071 yards on 183 carries; he led the league in yards per carry (5.9), yards from scrimmage (1,533), and fumbles (eleven). On December 18, 1960, he rushed for his only 200-yard game when he ran for 203 yards on 24 carries in a 38–7 victory over Pittsburgh. He was named to the Pro Bowl again while also receiving votes for MVP within UPI. However, he could not maintain his highs in 1961. He played in eight games and rushed for just 192 yards with 306 receiving yards that year.

The next year, Crow saw action in 14 games and rushed for 751 yards on 192 carries while catching 23 passes for 246 yards; he scored a career high seventeen touchdowns while dubiously leading the league in fumbles (fourteen). Crow's best game came on December 12, 1962, when he recorded 21 carries for 95 yards with three touchdowns before adding another on his lone reception from sixteen yards out as the Cardinals won 45–35 over the Philadelphia Eagles. It was the only time he had four touchdowns in a game and the only time he rushed for three touchdowns. Crow would be hindered by injuries in 1963, playing just three games (week 5–7), although he did record one touchdown on a ten-yard pass that helped in a 24–23 victory over Pittsburgh.

He played in thirteen games the following year, rushing for 554 yards on 163 carries while catching 23 passes for 257 yards. It would be his final season with the Cardinals.

Crow was traded to the San Francisco 49ers ahead of the 1965 season for veteran defensive back Abe Woodson, he played fourteen games and rushed for 514 yards with 132 carries while catching 28 passes for 493 yards; he made his fourth and final Pro Bowl while receiving votes for Comeback Player of the Year. He rushed for over 475 yards with receiving yards of over 300 in each of the next two seasons while playing in all fourteen games. Crow finished his career with the San Francisco 49ers. Crow received the annual Len Eshmont Award twice, in 1966 and 1967, voted by the players and given to the 49er who best exemplifies the "inspirational and courageous play" of Len Eshmont. In his final season in 1968, he primarily played tight end, and he caught 31 passes for 531 yards with five touchdowns.

In total, Crow scored 74 touchdowns over his career (38 rushing, 35 receiving, one fumble recovery) while also throwing five touchdown passes. His 74 touchdowns were 13th best all-time in football history upon his retirement. In 125 games, he rushed for 4,963 yards on 1,157 carries while catching 258 passes for 3,699 yards.

== Coaching career ==
When his playing career ended, Crow became a coach. In 1969, he was named the offensive backfield coach under Bryant at Alabama, a position he retained until 1971. He was personally close to Bryant, under whom Crow's son, John David "Johnny" Crow Jr., played at Alabama.

He later worked as an assistant coach with the Cleveland Browns and the San Diego Chargers.

Crow was the sixth head football coach for Northeast Louisiana University—now the University of Louisiana at Monroe—and he held that position for five seasons, from 1976 until 1980, with a record of 20–34–1 (.373).

== Athletic director ==
Crow became the athletic director and head football coach at Northeast Louisiana University in 1975. He remained there until 1981, when he left to pursue private business opportunities.

In 1983, he became assistant athletic director at Texas A&M under Jackie Sherrill, who served as both athletic director and head coach of the football team. Crow handled most duties for all sports except football, which Sherrill oversaw. He was promoted to athletic director at the end of the 1988 football season when Sherrill resigned in the midst of a scandal. Texas A&M President William Mobley hired R. C. Slocum, Sherrill's defensive coordinator, as the new head football coach. In a press conference the day after his appointment, Crow announced, "I want to reaffirm my commitment to full compliance with the NCAA, Southwest Conference, and Texas A&M University regulations in our athletic department."

After a public row in January 1990, Crow fired long-time Aggies basketball coach Shelby Metcalf, who had coached at Texas A&M for 32 years, with five Southwest Conference championships. The relationship between the men had often been described as bitter, and Crow cited "uncalled-for criticism" in his firing of Metcalf, who was not given the opportunity to say goodbye to his players. When asked by the media what happened between the two, Metcalf remarked, "I made a comment that I didn't think John David was all that bright. And I thought I was being generous." Crow appointed Kermit Davis to replace Metcalf.

Later that year, after Arkansas left the Southwest Conference, Crow and DeLoss Dodds, the athletic director at the University of Texas, met with officials from the Pac-10 Conference about aligning with that conference. The two later cancelled a similar meeting with officials from the Southeastern Conference.

Crow resigned from his position as athletic director in April 1993 to invest as a limited partner in a greyhound racetrack. At the time of his resignation, the Texas A&M football program was embroiled in a scandal over students accepting money from boosters for jobs they had not performed. He was succeeded as athletic director by Wally Groff. As a result of the scandal, the Texas A&M football program was placed on five years probation and was banned from television or postseason appearances for one year. He then took a job as the fundraiser for the university until 2001, when he retired.

== Awards and later life ==
Crow was elected to the College Football Hall of Fame as a player in 1976. In 2004, Crow was awarded the PriceWaterhouseCoopers Doak Walker Legends Award, presented annually by the SMU Athletic Forum. The award is given to former college football running backs who had excellent college careers and later became leaders in their community. In 1976, he was inducted into the Louisiana Sports Hall of Fame in Natchitoches.

Crow retired in College Station, Texas. In an interview with the Bryan-College Station Eagle, Crow said, "I tell everybody that A&M is my true love and that I want us to win everything that we do, but Alabama is a close second because of the ties I had with Coach Bryant, and with my son playing over there.

He died at a hospice in Bryan, Texas, on June 17, 2015; he was 79 years old, three weeks shy of his 80th birthday. In addition to their son, Crow and his high school sweetheart and wife of more than 60 years, the former Carolyn Gilliam, have two surviving daughters, Annalisa Stenklyft and husband, Jay, and Jeannie Pietrowiak and husband, Ken; daughter-in-law, Janice Crow, and seven grandchildren. He was cremated. A public reception was held in his memory on June 23 at Reed Arena in College Station.

== Career statistics ==
=== NFL ===
Legend
	Led the league
**Bold**	Career high

Year	Team	Games		Rushing					Receiving				
Year	Team	GP	GS	Att	Yds	Avg	Lng	TD	Rec	Yds	Avg	Lng	TD
1958	CRD	7	6	52	221	4.3	**83**	2	20	362	18.1	**91**	3
1959	CRD	12	11	140	666	4.8	73	3	27	328	12.1	36	4
1960	STL	12	12	183	**1,071**	**5.9**	57	6	25	462	**18.5**	52	3
1961	STL	8	7	48	192	4.0	17	1	20	306	15.3	35	3
1962	STL	**14**	**14**	**192**	751	3.9	35	**14**	23	246	10.7	53	3
1963	STL	3	0	9	34	3.8	9	0	0	0	0	0	0
1964	STL	13	11	163	554	3.4	57	7	23	257	11.2	22	1
1965	SF	**14**	13	132	514	3.9	30	2	28	493	17.6	54	**7**
1966	SF	**14**	**14**	121	477	3.9	31	1	30	341	11.4	54	3
1967	SF	**14**	**14**	113	479	4.2	39	2	**31**	373	12.0	59	3
1968	SF	**14**	**14**	4	4	1.0	3	0	**31**	**531**	17.1	54	5
Career		125	116	1,157	4,963	4.3	83	38	258	3,699	14.3	91	35

=== Head coaching record ===
Year	Team	Overall	Conference	Standing	Bowl/playoffs
**Northeast Louisiana Indians** (Division I / I-A independent) (1976–1980)
1976	Northeast Louisiana	2–9			
1977	Northeast Louisiana	2–9			
1978	Northeast Louisiana	6–4–1			
1979	Northeast Louisiana	3–8			
1980	Northeast Louisiana	7–4			
Northeast Louisiana:		20–34–1			
Total:		20–34–1			
