= List of San Francisco 49ers first-round draft picks =

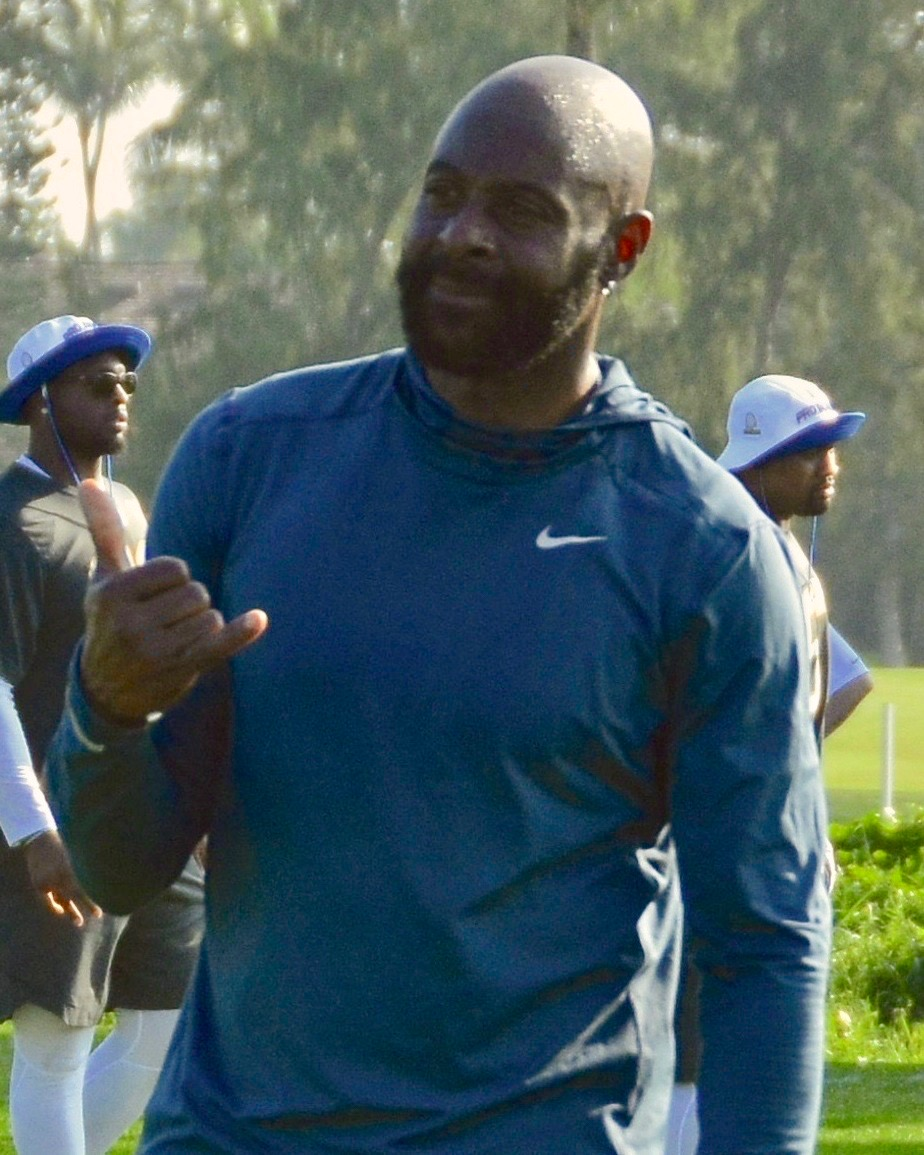
The 49ers moved up in the first round of the 1985 NFL draft to pick future hall of fame wide receiver Jerry Rice with the 16th overall pick. While playing for the 49ers, Rice was a 10-time first-team All-Pro, two-time NFL Offensive Player of the Year (1987 and 1993), and broke numerous NFL receiving records.

The San Francisco 49ers (also written as the San Francisco Forty-Niners) are a professional American football team based in the San Francisco Bay Area. The 49ers compete in the National Football League (NFL) as a member of the National Football Conference West Division. The team, founded in 1944 by Tony Morabito, is named after the prospectors who arrived in Northern California in the 1849 Gold Rush. The 49ers joined the NFL prior to the start of the 1950 NFL season. Since 2014 they have played their home games at Levi's Stadium in Santa Clara, California, located southeast of San Francisco.

The NFL draft, officially known as the "NFL Annual Player Selection Meeting", is an annual event which serves as the league's most common source of player recruitment. The draft order is determined based on the previous season's standings; the teams with the worst win–loss records receive the earliest picks. Teams that qualified for the NFL playoffs select after non-qualifiers, and their order depends on how far they advanced, using their regular season record as a tie-breaker. The final two selections in the first round are reserved for the Super Bowl runner-up and champion. Draft picks are tradable and players or other picks can be acquired with them. From 1947 through 1958 the NFL designated the first overall selection as a "bonus" or "lottery pick". The pick was awarded by a random draw and the winner who received the "bonus pick" forfeited its selection in the final round of the draft and became ineligible for future draws. The system was abolished prior to the 1959 NFL draft, as all twelve teams in the league at the time had received a bonus choice.

Since the team's first NFL draft in 1950, the 49ers have selected 88 players in the first round. The team's first-round pick in their inaugural NFL draft was Leo Nomellini, a defensive tackle from the University of Minnesota; he was the 11th overall selection. The 49ers have drafted first overall three times, selecting Harry Babcock in 1953, Dave Parks in 1964, and Alex Smith in 2005. Their most recent first-round draft pick pick was in 2025 when they chose Georgia defensive end Mykel Williams.

The 49ers did not draft a player in the first round on ten occasions. Nine of the team's first-round picks—Lance Alworth, Jimmy Johnson, Ronnie Lott, Hugh McElhenny, Leo Nomellini, Jerry Rice, Y. A. Tittle, Patrick Willis, and Bryant Young—have been elected to the Pro Football Hall of Fame; one of these, Lance Alworth, chose to sign with the NFL's pre-merger direct competitor, the American Football League (AFL), and never played for the 49ers.

== Player selections ==
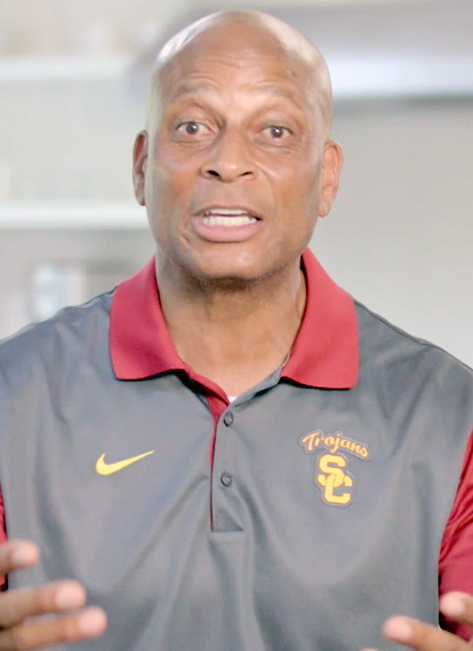
Hall of Fame defensive back Ronnie Lott was drafted by the 49ers with the 8th overall pick in the 1981 NFL draft. He spent 10 seasons with the team, during which time he was a seven-time All-Pro and nine-time Pro Bowler. Lott was unanimously selected for the NFL 100th Anniversary All-Time Team.

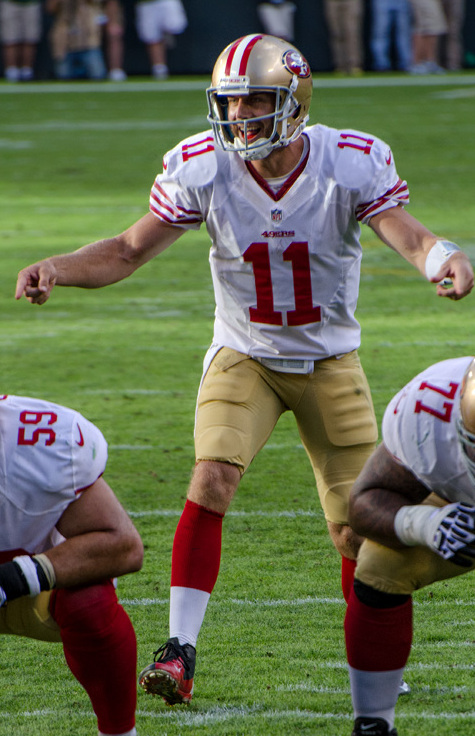
Quarterback Alex Smith was selected first overall by the 49ers in the 2005 NFL draft.

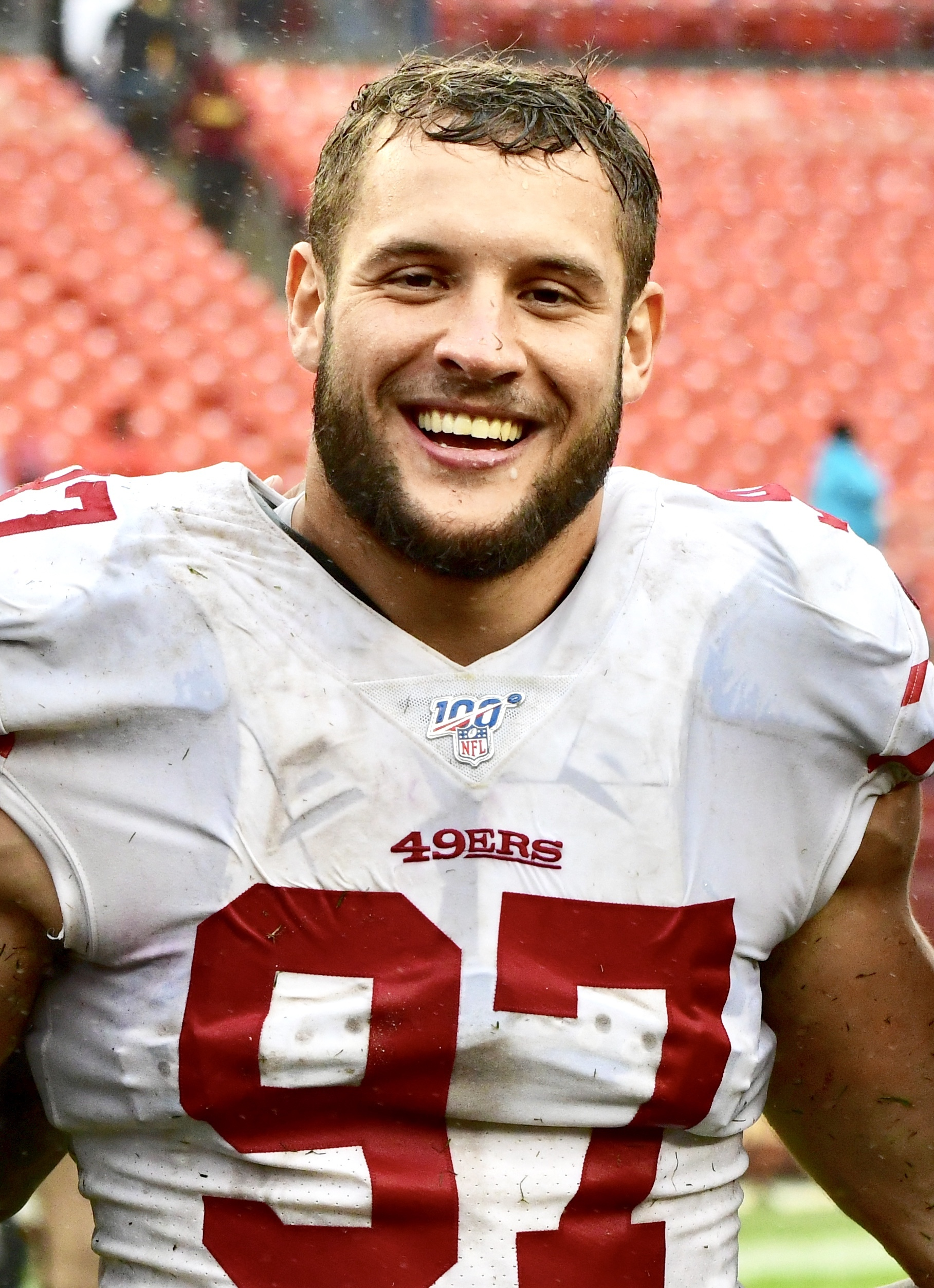
Defensive end Nick Bosa was drafted second overall by the 49ers in the 2019 NFL draft. Bosa was named the 2019 Defensive Rookie of the Year, 2022 Defensive Player of the Year, and has made 4 Pro Bowls.

Key
Symbol	Meaning
†	Inducted into the Pro Football Hall of Fame
*	Selected number one overall

Position abbreviations
C	Center
CB	Cornerback
DB	Defensive back
DE	Defensive end
DT	Defensive tackle
FB	Fullback
FL	Flanker
G	Guard
HB	Halfback
LB	Linebacker
QB	Quarterback
RB	Running back
S	Safety
T	Tackle
TE	Tight end
WR	Wide receiver

San Francisco 49ers first-round draft picks
Season	Pick	Player	Position	College	Notes
1950	11	Leo Nomellini†	DT	Minnesota	
1951	3	Y. A. Tittle†	QB	LSU	
1952	9	Hugh McElhenny†	HB	Washington	
1953	1	Harry Babcock*	TE	Georgia	Lottery bonus pick
1953	10	Tom Stolhandske	TE	Texas	
1954	11	Bernie Faloney	QB	Maryland	
1955	10	Dicky Moegle	HB	Rice	
1956	2	Earl Morrall	QB	Michigan State	
1957	3	John Brodie	QB	Stanford	
1958	8	Jim Pace	HB	Michigan	Pick received from Pittsburgh Steelers (Note: San Francisco traded quarterback Earl Morrall and guard Mike Sandusky to the Pittsburgh Steelers in exchange for their 1958 first-round selection (No. 8 overall), 1959 first-round selection (No. 8 overall), and linebacker Marv Matuszak.)
1958	9	Charlie Krueger	DT	Texas A&M	
1959	5	Dave Baker	QB	Oklahoma	
1959	8	Dan James	C	Ohio State	Pick received from Pittsburgh Steelers
1960	11	Monty Stickles	TE	Notre Dame	
1961	6	Jimmy Johnson†	CB	UCLA	Pick received from Pittsburgh Steelers (Note: San Francisco traded defensive back Dicky Moegle to the Pittsburgh Steelers in exchange for their 1961 first-round selection (No. 6 overall).)
1961	9	Bernie Casey	WR	Bowling Green State	
1961	11	Billy Kilmer	QB	UCLA	Pick received from Baltimore Colts (Note: San Francisco traded tight end Dee Mackey to the Baltimore Colts in exchange for their 1961 first-round selection (No. 11 overall).)
1962	8	Lance Alworth†	FL	Arkansas	Signed for the AFL's San Diego Chargers instead
1963	8	Kermit Alexander	DB	UCLA	
1964	1	Dave Parks*	WR	Texas Tech	
1965	2	Ken Willard	FB	North Carolina	
1965	13	George Donnelly	DB	Illinois	Pick received from Cleveland Browns (Note: San Francisco traded guard Ted Connolly to the Cleveland Browns in exchange for their 1965 first-round selection (No. 13 overall).)
1966	11	Stan Hindman	T	Ole Miss	
1967	3	Steve Spurrier	QB	Florida	Pick received from Atlanta Falcons (Note: San Francisco traded receiver Bernie Casey, defensive lineman Jim Wilson, and defensive end Jim Norton to the Atlanta Falcons in exchange for their 1967 first-round selection (No. 3 overall).)
1967	11	Cas Banaszek	TE	Northwestern	
1968	15	Forrest Blue	C	Auburn	
1969	7	Ted Kwalick	TE	Penn State	Pick received from New Orleans Saints (Note: San Francisco received Kevin Hardy and New Orleans Saints' 1969 first-round selection (No. 7 overall) as compensation for the Saints' signing of receiver Dave Parks in the days prior to unrestricted free agency.)
1969	16	Gene Washington	WR	Stanford	
1970	9	Cedrick Hardman	DE	North Texas	
1970	17	Bruce Taylor	DB	Boston	Pick received from Washington Redskins (Note: San Francisco traded offensive tackle Walt Rock to the Washington Redskins in exchange for their 1970 first-round selection (No. 17 overall).)
1971	23	Tim Anderson	DB	Ohio State	
1972	19	Terry Beasley	WR	Auburn	
1973	18	Mike Holmes	DB	Texas Southern	
1974	9	Wilbur Jackson	RB	Alabama	Pick received from New England Patriots (Note: San Francisco traded tight end Bob Windsor to the New England Patriots in exchange for their 1974 first-round selection (No. 9 overall).)
1974	10	Bill Sandifer	DT	UCLA	
1975	10	Jimmy Webb	DT	Mississippi State	
1976	No pick				Pick traded to New England Patriots (Note: San Francisco traded running back Vic Washington to the Houston Oilers in exchange for their 1976 first-round selection (No. 21 overall) and 1977 third-round selection (No. 65 overall).) (Note: San Francisco traded their two 1976 first-round selections (Nos. 12 and 21, received from Houston Oilers) their 1977 first- and second-round selections (Nos. 16 and 44 overall), and quarterback Tom Owen to the New England Patriots for quarterback Jim Plunkett.)
1977	No pick				Pick traded to New England Patriots
1978	7	Ken MacAfee	TE	Notre Dame	
1978	24	Dan Bunz	LB	Long Beach State	Pick received from Miami Dolphins (Note: San Francisco traded running back Delvin Williams to the Miami Dolphins in exchange for their 1978 first- and fifth-round selections (Nos. 24 and 133 overall), defensive back Vern Roberson, and wide receiver Freddie Solomon.)
1979	No pick				Pick traded to Buffalo Bills (Note: San Francisco traded their 1978 second- and third-round selections (Nos. 38 and 65 overall), 1979 first- and fourth-round selections (Nos. 1 and 83 overall), and 1980 second-round selection (No. 29 overall) to the Buffalo Bills in exchange for running back O. J. Simpson.)
1980	13	Earl Cooper	RB	Rice	Moved down draft order in trade with New York Jets (Note: San Francisco traded their 1980 first-round selection (No. 2 overall) to the New York Jets in exchange for their two 1980 first-round selections (Nos. 13 and 20 overall).)
1980	20	Jim Stuckey	DT	Clemson	Pick received from New York Jets
1981	8	Ronnie Lott†	DB	USC	
1982	No pick				Pick traded to New England Patriots (Note: San Francisco traded their 1982 first-, fourth-, and two second-round selections (Nos. 27, 42, 55, and 111 overall) to the New England Patriots in exchange for their 1982 second-round selection (No. 29 overall) and tight end Russ Francis.)
1983	No pick				Pick traded to San Diego Chargers (Note: San Francisco traded their 1983 second-round selection (No. 36 overall) to the San Diego Chargers in exchange for defensive end Fred Dean and the option to swap 1983 first-round selections. San Diego went on to exercise this option, forcing San Francisco to trade their 1983 first-round selection (No. 5 overall) to San Diego in exchange for their 1983 first-round selection (No. 22 overall).) (Note: San Francisco traded a 1983 first-round selection (No. 22 overall, received from San Diego Chargers) to the San Diego Chargers in exchange for their two 1983 second-round selections (Nos. 36 and 49 overall).)
1984	24	Todd Shell	LB	BYU	
1985	16	Jerry Rice†	WR	Mississippi Valley State	Moved up draft order in trade with New England Patriots (Note: San Francisco traded their 1985 first-, second-, and third-round selections (Nos. 28, 56, and 84 overall) to the New England Patriots in exchange for their 1985 first- and third-round selections (Nos. 16 and 75 overall).)
1986	No pick				Moved down draft order in trades with Dallas Cowboys (Note: San Francisco traded their 1986 first-round selection (No. 18 overall) to the Dallas Cowboys in exchange for their 1986 first- and sixth-round selections (Nos. 20 and 131 overall).) and Buffalo Bills (Note: San Francisco traded a 1986 first-round selection (No. 20 overall, received from Dallas Cowboys) and 1987 tenth-round selection (No. 273 overall) to the Buffalo Bills in exchange for their 1986 second- and third-round selections (Nos. 29 and 56 overall).)
1987	22	Harris Barton	T	North Carolina	
1987	25	Terrence Flagler	RB	Clemson	Pick received from Washington Redskins (Note: San Francisco traded their 1986 second-round selection (No. 45 overall) to the Washington Redskins in exchange for their 1986 tenth-round selection (No. 270 overall) and 1987 first-round selection (No. 25 overall).)
1988	No pick				Moved down draft order in trade with Los Angeles Raiders (Note: San Francisco traded their 1988 first-round selection (No. 26 overall) to the Los Angeles Raiders in exchange for their 1988 second- and fourth-round selections (Nos. 33 and 102 overall) and wide receiver Dokie Williams.)
1989	28	Keith DeLong	LB	Tennessee	
1990	25	Dexter Carter	RB	Florida State	
1991	25	Ted Washington	DT	Louisville	
1992	18	Dana Hall	DB	Washington	
1993	26	Dana Stubblefield	DT	Kansas	Pick received from Kansas City Chiefs (Note: San Francisco traded quarterback Joe Montana, safety David Whitmore, and a 1994 third-round selection (No. 92 overall) to the Kansas City Chiefs in exchange for their 1993 first-round selection (No. 18 overall).) and used to move down draft order in trades with Phoenix Cardinals (Note: San Francisco traded a 1993 first-round selection (No. 18 overall, received from Kansas City Chiefs) to the Phoenix Cardinals in exchange for their 1993 first- and fifth-round selections (Nos. 20 and 116 overall).) and New Orleans Saints (Note: San Francisco traded a 1993 first-round selection (No. 20 overall, received from Phoenix Cardinals) to the New Orleans Saints in exchange for their 1993 first- and third-round selections (Nos. 26 and 81 overall).)
1993	27	Todd Kelly	DT	Tennessee	
1994	7	Bryant Young†	DT	Notre Dame	Pick received from San Diego Chargers (Note: San Francisco traded their 1993 second-round selection (No. 41 overall) to the San Diego Chargers in exchange for their 1994 first-round selection (No. 15 overall).) and used to move up draft order in trade with Los Angeles Rams (Note: San Francisco traded their 1994 first-, second, and third round selections (Nos. 15, received from San Diego Chargers, 56, and 100 overall) to the Los Angeles Rams in exchange for their 1994 first-round selection (No. 7 overall).)
1994	28	William Floyd	RB	Florida State	Moved down draft order in trade with Dallas Cowboys (Note: San Francisco traded their 1994 first- and seventh-round selections (Nos. 23 and 217 overall) to the Dallas Cowboys in exchange for their 1994 first- and second-round selections. (Nos. 28 and 62 overall).)
1995	10	J. J. Stokes	WR	UCLA	Moved up draft order in trade with Cleveland Browns (Note: San Francisco traded their 1995 first-, third, and fourth-round selections (Nos. 30, 94, and 119 overall) and 1996 first-round selection (No. 26 overall) to the Cleveland Browns in exchange for their 1995 first-round selection (No. 10 overall).)
1996	No pick				Pick traded to Cleveland Browns
1997	26	Jim Druckenmiller	QB	Virginia Tech	
1998	28	R. W. McQuarters	CB	Oklahoma State	
1999	24	Reggie McGrew	DT	Florida	Moved up draft order in trade with Miami Dolphins (Note: San Francisco traded their 1999 first- and fifth-round selections (Nos. 27 and 134 overall) to the Miami Dolphins in exchange for their 1999 first-round selection (No. 24 overall).)
2000	16	Julian Peterson	LB	Michigan State	Moved down draft order in trade with Washington Redskins (Note: San Francisco traded their 2000 first-round selection (No. 3 overall) to the Washington Redskins in exchange for their two 2000 first-round selections (Nos. 12 and 24 overall).) and New York Jets (Note: San Francisco traded a 2000 first-round selection (No. 12 overall, received from Washington Redskins) to the New York Jets in exchange for their 2000 first- and second-round selections (Nos. 16 and 48 overall).)
2000	24	Ahmed Plummer	CB	Ohio State	Pick received from Washington Redskins
2001	7	Andre Carter	DE	California	Moved up draft order in trade with Seattle Seahawks (Note: San Francisco traded their 2001 first- third- and seventh- round selections (Nos. 9, 82, and 222 overall) to the Seattle Seahawks in exchange for their 2001 first- and sixth-round selections (Nos. 7 and 191 overall).)
2002	27	Mike Rumph	CB	Miami (FL)	
2003	26	Kwame Harris	T	Stanford	
2004	31	Rashaun Woods	WR	Oklahoma State	Moved down draft order in trades with Philadelphia Eagles (Note: San Francisco traded their 2004 first-round selection (No. 16 overall) to the Philadelphia Eagles in exchange for their 2004 first- and second-round selections (Nos. 28 and 58 overall).) and Carolina Panthers (Note: San Francisco traded a first-round selection (No. 28 overall, received from Philadelphia Eagles) to the Carolina Panthers in exchange for their 2004 first- and fourth-round selections (Nos. 31 and 127 overall).)
2005	1	Alex Smith*	QB	Utah	
2006	6	Vernon Davis	TE	Maryland	
2006	22	Manny Lawson	LB	North Carolina State	Moved up draft order in trade with Denver Broncos (Note: San Francisco traded their 2006 second- and third-round selections (Nos. 37 and 68 overall) to the Denver Broncos in exchange for their 2006 first-round selection (No. 22 overall).)
2007	11	Patrick Willis†	LB	Ole Miss	
2007	28	Joe Staley	T	Central Michigan	Pick received from New England Patriots (Note: San Francisco traded their 2007 fourth-round selection (No. 110 overall) and 2008 first-round selection (No. 7 overall) to the New England Patriots in exchange for their 2007 first-round selection (No. 28 overall).)
2008	29	Kentwan Balmer	DT	North Carolina	Original pick traded to New England Patriots. Moved up draft order in trade with Indianapolis Colts. (Note: San Francisco traded their 2007 second-round selection (No. 42 overall) to the Indianapolis Colts in exchange for their 2007 fourth-round selection (No. 126 overall) and 2008 first-round selection (No. 29 overall).)
2009	10	Michael Crabtree	WR	Texas Tech	
2010	11	Anthony Davis	T	Rutgers	Moved up draft order in trade with Denver Broncos (Note: San Francisco traded their 2010 first- and fourth-round selections (Nos. 13 and 113 overall) to the Denver Broncos in exchange for their 2010 first-round selection (No. 11 overall).)
2010	17	Mike Iupati	G	Idaho	Pick received from Carolina Panthers (Note: San Francisco traded their 2009 second- and fourth-round selections (Nos. 43 and 111 overall) to the Carolina Panthers in exchange for their 2010 first-round selection (No. 17 overall).)
2011	7	Aldon Smith	LB	Missouri	
2012	30	A. J. Jenkins	WR	Illinois	
2013	18	Eric Reid	S	LSU	Moved up draft order in trade with Dallas Cowboys (Note: San Francisco traded their 2013 first- and third-round selections (Nos. 31 and 74 overall) to the Dallas Cowboys in exchange for their 2013 first-round selection (No. 18 overall).)
2014	30	Jimmie Ward	S	Northern Illinois	
2015	17	Arik Armstead	DE	Oregon	Moved down draft order in trade with San Diego Chargers (Note: San Francisco traded their 2015 first-round selection (No. 15 overall) to the San Diego Chargers in exchange for their 2015 first- and fourth-round selections (Nos. 17 and 117 overall) and 2016 fifth-round selection (No. 142 overall).)
2016	7	DeForest Buckner	DE	Oregon	
2016	28	Joshua Garnett	G	Stanford	Moved up draft order in trade with Kansas City Chiefs (Note: San Francisco traded their 2016 second-, fourth-, and sixth-round selections (Nos. 37, 105, and 178 overall) to the Kansas City Chiefs in exchange for their 2016 first-round selection (No. 28 overall).)
2017	3	Solomon Thomas	DE	Stanford	Moved down draft order in trade with Chicago Bears (Note: San Francisco traded their 2017 first-round selection (No. 2 overall) to the Chicago Bears in exchange for their 2017 first-, third-, and fourth-round selections (Nos. 3, 67, and 111 overall) and 2018 third-round selection (No. 70 overall).)
2017	31	Reuben Foster	LB	Alabama	Moved up draft order in trade with Seattle Seahawks (Note: San Francisco traded their 2017 second- and fourth-round selections (Nos. 34 and 111 overall) to the Seattle Seahawks in exchange for their 2017 first-round selection (No. 31 overall).)
2018	9	Mike McGlinchey	T	Notre Dame	
2019	2	Nick Bosa	DE	Ohio State	
2020	14	Javon Kinlaw	DT	South Carolina	Pick received from Indianapolis Colts. (Note: San Francisco traded defensive tackle DeForest Buckner to the Indianapolis Colts in exchange for their 2020 first-round selection (No. 13 overall).) Moved down draft order in trade with Tampa Bay Buccaneers. (Note: San Francisco traded their 2020 first- and seventh-round selections (Nos. 13 and 245 overall) to the Tampa Bay Buccaneers in exchange for their 2020 first- and fourth-round selections (Nos. 14 and 117 overall).)
2020	25	Brandon Aiyuk	WR	Arizona State	Moved up draft order in trade with Minnesota Vikings (Note: San Francisco traded their 2020 first-, fourth-, and fifth-round selections (Nos. 31, 117, and 176 overall) to the Minnesota Vikings in exchange for their 2020 first-round selection (No. 24 overall).)
2021	3	Trey Lance	QB	North Dakota State	Moved up draft order in trade with Miami Dolphins (Note: San Francisco traded their 2021 first-round selection (No. 12 overall), 2022 first- and third-round selections (Nos. 29 and 102 overall), and 2023 first-round selection (No. 29 overall) to the Miami Dolphins in exchange for their 2021 first-round selection (No. 3 overall).)
2022	No pick				Pick traded to Miami Dolphins
2023	No pick				Pick traded to Miami Dolphins
2024	31	Ricky Pearsall	WR	Florida	
2025	11	Mykel Williams	DE	Georgia	
2026	No pick				Pick traded to Miami Dolphins (Note: San Francisco traded 2026 first- and fourth-round selections (27th and 138th overall) to Miami in exchange for first- and third-round selections (30th and 90th overall).)

== See also ==
- San Francisco 49ers draft history
- History of the San Francisco 49ers
- List of San Francisco 49ers seasons
