= San Francisco 49ers draft history =

This page is a list of San Francisco 49ers NFL draft selections. The first draft the 49ers participated in was the 1950 NFL draft, in which they made Leo Nomellini of Minnesota their first-ever NFL selection.

== Key ==
= Pro Bowler
= MVP
= Hall of Famer

== 1950 draft ==
Round	Pick #	Overall	Name	Position	College
1	11	11	Leo Nomellini	Defensive tackle	Minnesota
2	9	23	Don Campora	Offensive tackle	Pacific
3	10	37	Ray Collins	Defensive tackle	Louisiana State
4	9	49	Morris Bailey	End	Texas Christian
5	10	63	Harry Kane	Center	Pacific
6	9	75	Don Van Pool	End	Oklahoma A&M
7	10	89	Lindy Berry	Quarterback	Texas Christian
8	9	101	Ellery Williams	End	Santa Clara
9	10	115	Pete Zinach	Back	West Virginia
10	9	127	Bob Celeri	Quarterback	California
11	10	141	Harley Dow	Tackle	San Jose State
12	9	153	Don Burke	Back	Southern California
13	10	167	Lou Cecconi	Back	Pittsburgh
14	9	179	Tom Payne	End	Santa Clara
15	10	193	Leo Crampsey	End	St. Bonaventure
16	9	205	Charley Shaw	Guard	Oklahoma A&M
17	10	219	Cliff Van Meter	Back	Tulane
18	9	231	Ralph Genito	Back	Kentucky
19	10	245	Forest Klein	Guard	California
20	9	257	Jack Nix	End	Southern California
21	10	271	Guerin Alker	Center	Loyola Marymount
22	9	283	Billy Wilson	Wide receiver	San Jose State
23	10	297	James Williams	End	Rice
24	9	309	Bill Wyman	Tackle	Rice
25	10	323	Bob Dunn	Guard	Dayton
26	9	335	Jim Powers	Back	Southern California
27	10	349	Ken Johnson	Guard	Pacific
28	9	361	Charley Hall	Back	Arizona
29	10	375	Bob Whelan	Back	Boston University
30	9	387	Bob Stillwell	Back	Southern California

== 1951 draft ==
Round	Pick #	Overall	Name	Position	College
1	3	3	Y. A. Tittle	Quarterback	Louisiana State
2	3	17	Pete Schablein	Running back	California
3	2	28	Bill Mixon	Back	Georgia
5	3	53	Dick Steere	Tackle	Drake
5	4	54	Al Carapella	Defensive tackle	Miami (FL)
6	2	64	Bishop Strickland	Back	South Carolina
7	1	75	Dick Forbes	End	Saint Ambrose
8	3	89	Joe Arenas	Back	Omaha
9	2	100	Bruce Van Alstyne	End	Stanford
10	2	112	Nick Feher	Guard	Georgia
11	3	126	Bill Jessup	End	Southern California
12	2	137	Jim Monachino	Running back	California
13	1	148	Dick Harvin	End	Georgia Tech
14	3	162	Rex Berry	Cornerback	Brigham Young
15	2	173	Dave Sparks	Guard	South Carolina
16	1	184	Bob White	Back	Stanford
17	3	198	Art Michalik	Linebacker	Saint Ambrose
18	2	209	Jim Murphy	Tackle	Xavier
19	1	220	John Phillips	Back	Southern Mississippi
20	3	234	Al Tate	Tackle	Illinois
21	2	245	Hardy Brown	Linebacker	Tulsa
22	1	256	Dwight Winslow	Back	Boise J.C.
23	3	270	Wally Brunswald	Back	Gustavus Adolphus
24	2	281	Tom Kingsford	Back	Montana
25	1	292	Mike Peterson	End	Denver
26	3	306	Keith Carpenter	Tackle	San Jose State
27	2	317	Ray Lung	Guard	Oregon
28	1	328	Jack Rohan	Back	Loras
29	3	342	S.P. Garnett	Tackle	Kansas
30	2	353	Jerry Faske	Back	Iowa

== 1952 draft ==
Round	Pick #	Overall	Name	Position	College
1	9	9	Hugh McElhenny	Running back	Washington
2	9	22	Bob Toneff	Defensive tackle	Notre Dame
3	2	27	Gene Shannon	Back	Houston
3	8	33	Billy Tidwell	Running back	Texas A&M
4	9	46	Marion Campbell	Defensive end	Georgia
5	8	57	Pat O'Donahue	Defensive end	Wisconsin
6	9	70	Jim Beasley	Center	Tulsa
7	8	81	Don Robison	Back	California
8	9	94	Jerry Smith	Tackle	Wisconsin
9	8	105	Glen Christian	Back	Idaho
10	9	118	Carl West	Back	Mississippi
11	8	129	J. D. Kimmel	Defensive tackle	Houston
12	9	142	Fred Snyder	End	Loyola Marymount
13	8	153	Rudy Yeager	Tackle	Louisiana State
14	9	166	Frank Simons	End	Nebraska
15	8	177	Haldo Norman	End	Gustavus Adolphus
16	9	190	Bob Meyers	Fullback	Stanford
17	8	201	Al Baldock	End	Southern California
18	9	214	Bill Carey	End	Michigan State
20	9	238	Jess Yates	End	Louisiana State
21	8	249	Gene Offield	Center	Hardin–Simmons
22	9	262	Jim Cozad	Tackle	Santa Clara
23	8	273	Bill Glazier	End	Arizona
24	9	286	Ralph Kreuger	Tackle	California
25	8	297	Bud Laughlin	Fullback	Kansas
26	9	310	Dick Kane	Guard	Cincinnati
27	8	321	Waldo Schaaf	Tackle	Oklahoma A&M
28	9	334	Joe Palumbo	Guard	Virginia
29	8	345	Chuck Mosher	End	Colorado
30	9	358	Dick Patrick	Center	Oregon

== 1953 draft ==
Round	Pick #	Overall	Name	Position	College
1	1	1	Harry Babcock	End	Georgia
1	10	10	Tom Stolhanske	End	Texas
2	8	21	George Morris	Center	Georgia Tech
3	3	32	Bob St. Clair	Offensive tackle	San Francisco
4	9	46	Ed Fullerton	Back	Maryland
5	8	57	Hal Miller	Tackle	Georgia Tech
7	9	82	Paul Carr	Back	Houston
8	8	93	Doug Hogland	Offensive tackle	Oregon State
9	7	104	Hal Ledyard	Quarterback	Chattanooga
10	9	118	Pete Brown	Guard	Georgia Tech
11	8	129	Al Charlton	Back	Washington State
12	7	140	Carson Leach	Guard	Duke
13	9	154	Bill Earley	Back	Washington
14	8	165	Tom Fletcher	Back	Arizona State
15	7	176	Charley Genthner	Tackle	Texas
16	9	190	Fred During	End	Bowling Green
17	8	201	Hugh Latham	Tackle	San Diego State
18	7	212	Stan Wacholz	End	San Jose State
19	9	226	King DuClos	Tackle	UTEP
20	8	237	Ray Huizinga	Tackle	Northwestern
21	7	248	Ken Bahnsen	End	North Texas State
22	9	262	Laverne Robbins	Guard	Midwestern State
23	8	273	Travis Hunt	Tackle	Alabama
24	7	284	Ed Morgan	Back	Tennessee
25	9	298	Ernie Stockert	End	UCLA
26	8	309	Harley Cooper	Back	Arizona State
27	7	320	Ralph McLeod	End	Louisiana State
28	9	334	Tom Novikoff	Back	Oregon
29	8	345	Don Stillwell	End	Southern California

== 1954 draft ==
Round	Pick #	Overall	Name	Position	College
1	11	11	Bernie Faloney	Quarterback	Maryland
2	10	23	Leo Rucka	Center	Rice
3	10	35	Steve Korcheck	Center	George Washington
4	10	47	Charlie Boxold	Back	Maryland
5	6	55	Bob Hantla	Guard	Kansas
5	10	59	Frank Mincevich	Guard	South Carolina
6	10	71	Floyd Sagely	End	Arkansas
7	10	83	Sid Youngelman	Offensive tackle	Alabama
9	10	107	Ted Connolly	Guard	Tulsa
11	10	131	John Skocko	End	Southern California
12	10	143	Hal Easterwood	Center	Mississippi State
13	10	155	Morgan Williams	Guard	Texas Christian
14	10	167	Sammy Williams	Back	California
15	2	171	Ed Gossage	Tackle	Georgia Tech
15	10	179	Sam Palumbo	Guard	Notre Dame
16	10	191	Bobby Fiveash	Back	Florida State
17	10	203	Carl Kautz	Tackle	Texas Tech
18	10	215	Morris Kay	End	Kansas
19	10	227	Bob Edmiston	Tackle	Temple
20	10	239	Frank DiPietro	Back	Georgia
21	10	251	Howard Alsup	Tackle	Middle Tennessee State
22	10	263	Ralph Reynolds	Back	North Texas State
23	10	275	LeRoy Fenstemaker	Back	Rice
24	10	287	Jerry Daniels	Tackle	Tennessee Tech
25	10	299	John Platt	Back	Elon
26	10	311	Pete Bello	Center	Pasadena City College
27	10	323	Gayford Baker	Guard	Nebraska–Omaha
28	10	335	Bob Garbrecht	Back	Rice
29	10	347	Ted Dunn	Back	Murray State
30	10	359	Don Folks	End	Houston

== 1955 draft ==
Round	Pick #	Overall	Name	Position	College
1	10	10	Dicky Moegle	Defensive back	Rice
2	8	21	Frank Morze	Center	Boston College
3	9	34	Carroll Hardy	Back	Colorado
4	8	45	Matt Hazeltine	Linebacker	California
5	9	58	Eldred Kraemer	Tackle	Pittsburgh
6	8	69	Bobby Luna	Defensive back	Alabama
7	9	82	Johnny Dean	Back	Virginia Tech
8	8	93	Freddie Meyers	Back	Oklahoma A&M
9	9	106	Fred Preziosio	Tackle	Purdue
10	8	117	Ron Aschbacker	End	Oregon State
11	9	130	Rudy Rotella	End	Nebraska–Omaha
12	8	141	Lou Palatella	Tackle	PIttsburgh
13	9	154	Richie Gaskell	End	George Washington
14	8	165	Nick McKeithan	Back	Duke
15	9	178	Burdette Hess	Guard	Idaho
16	8	189	Jim Hall	End	Auburn
17	9	202	Bob Newton	Guard	San Diego State
18	8	213	Ron Pheister	Center	Oregon
19	9	226	John Garzoli	Tackle	California
20	8	237	Glen Dyer	Back	Texas
21	9	250	George Maderos	End	Cal State Chico
22	8	261	Pete Vann	Quarterback	Army
23	9	274	Tom Gunnari	End	Washington State
24	8	285	Bob Heaston	Guard	Cal Poly San Luis Obispo
25	9	298	Dewey Wade	End	Kansas State
26	8	309	Johnny Kerr	End	Purdue
27	9	322	Dick Shockey	Back	Marquette
28	8	333	Don Sanders	Back	Stanford
29	9	346	Otto Kniedinger	Tackle	Penn State
30	7	356	Bob Gongola	Back	Illinois

== 1956 draft ==
Round	Pick #	Overall	Name	Position	College
1	2	2	Earl Morrall	Quarterback	Michigan State
2	2	15	Bruce Bosley	Offensive tackle	West Virginia
3	1	26	Bill Herchman	Defensive tackle	Texas Tech
4	3	40	Frank Pajaczkowski	Back	Richmond
6	3	64	Tony Sardisco	Guard	Tulane
7	2	75	Larry Barnes	Back	Colorado State
8	3	88	Charley Smith	End	Abilene Christian
9	2	99	Jim Cox	End	Cal Poly San Luis Obispo
10	3	112	Jerry Zaleski	End	Colorado State
11	2	123	Stew Pell	Tackle	North Carolina
12	3	136	Roger Swedberg	Tackle	Iowa
13	2	147	Ralph Moody	Back	Kansas
14	3	160	R. C. Owens	Wide receiver	College of Idaho
15	2	171	Reed Henderson	Tackle	Utah State
16	3	184	George Herring	Quarterback	Southern Mississippi
17	2	195	Dick Weiss	Tackle	Mississippi
18	3	208	Bill Yelverton	Tackle	Mississippi
19	2	219	Pete Arrigoni	Back	Arizona
20	3	232	Bob Scarbrough	Center	Auburn
21	2	243	L. C. Joyner	End	Contra Costa College
22	3	256	Clarence Wessman	End	San Jose State
23	2	267	Mike Monroe	Back	Washington
24	3	280	Ed Wallace	Tackle	San Diego J.C.
25	2	291	Paul Goad	Back	Abilene Christian
26	3	304	Rommie Loudd	Tight end	UCLA
27	2	315	Jerry Gustafson	Quarterback	Stanford
28	3	328	Jerry Drew	Back	California
29	2	339	Dean Benson	Guard	Willamette
30	2	351	Bob Mitchell	Tackle	Puget Sound

== 1957 draft ==
Round	Pick #	Overall	Name	Position	College
1	3	3	John Brodie	Quarterback	Stanford
2	2	15	Abe Woodson	Cornerback	Illinois
4	2	39	Jimmy Ridlon	Safety	Syracuse
4	9	46	Mike Sandusky	Guard	Maryland
5	7	56	Karl Rubke	Center	Southern California
6	1	62	Bill Rhodes	Back	Western State (CO)
6	7	68	Jim Hunter	Back	Missouri
7	7	80	Fred Dugan	Wide receiver	Dayton
8	7	92	Ernie Pitts	Wide receiver	Denver
9	7	104	Charley Brueckman	Center	Pittsburgh
10	7	116	Jerry Hurst	End	Middle Tennessee State
11	7	128	Tommy Davis	Kicker	Louisiana State
12	7	140	Fred Sington	Tackle	Alabama
13	7	152	Charley Mackey	End	Arizona State
14	7	164	Ron Warzeka	Tackle	Montana State
15	7	176	Earl Kaiser	Back	Houston
16	7	188	Vic Kristopalitis	Back	Dayton
17	7	200	Dave Kuhn	Center	Kentucky
18	7	212	Dick Guy	Guard	Ohio State
19	7	224	Gene Babb	Fullback	Austin
20	7	236	Sid DeLoatch	Guard	Duke
21	7	248	Fred Wilcox	Back	Tulane
22	7	260	Paul Tripp	Tackle	Idaho State
23	7	272	John Thomas	Tackle	Pacific
24	7	284	John Ladner	End	Wake Forest
25	7	296	Ray Meyer	Back	Lamar
26	7	308	Tom Topping	Tackle	Duke
27	7	320	Don Vicic	Back	Ohio State
28	7	332	Bill Curtis	Back	Texas Christian
29	7	344	Vern Hallbeck	Back	Texas Christian
30	6	355	George Parks	Back	Lamar

== 1958 draft ==
Round	Pick #	Overall	Name	Position	College
1	8	8	Jim Pace	Running back	Michigan
1	9	9	Charlie Krueger	Defensive tackle	Texas A&M
2	9	22	Bob Newman	Back	Washington State
3	8	33	Bobby Hoppe	Running back	Auburn
4	9	46	John Varone	Back	Miami (FL)
5	10	59	Bill Atkins	Defensive back	Auburn
6	10	71	Henry Schmidt	Defensive tackle	Southern California
8	2	87	Leon Burton	Back	Arizona State
8	10	95	Ron Mills	Back	West Texas State
9	10	107	George Troutman	Tackle	Capital
10	10	119	Vel Heckman	Tackle	Florida
11	10	131	Hogan Wharton	Tackle	Houston
12	10	143	Pete Williams	Tackle	Lehigh
13	6	151	Jim Yore	Back	Indiana
13	10	155	Hal Dukes	End	Michigan State
14	10	167	Max Fields	Back	Whittier
16	10	191	George Shirkey	Tackle	Stephen F. Austin
17	10	203	John Wittenborn	Kicker	Southeast Missouri State
18	10	215	Dennit Morris	Linebacker	Oklahoma
19	10	227	Rannie Mushatt	Center	Grambling State
20	10	239	Jerry Mertens	Cornerback	Drake
21	10	251	Don Christian	Back	Arkansas
22	10	263	Bruce Hartman	Tackle	Luther
23	10	275	Larry Fields	Back	Utah
24	10	287	Dee Mackey	Tight end	East Texas State
25	10	299	Bill Kaczmarek	Center	Southwest Missouri State
26	10	311	Hilliard Hill	End	Southern California
27	10	323	Bob Witucki	End	Texas Tech
28	10	335	Garland Warren	Center	North Texas State
29	10	347	Herman Hodges	Back	Sam Houston State
30	9	358	Ted Stahura	Tackle	Kansas State

== 1959 draft ==
Round	Pick #	Overall	Name	Position	College
1	5	5	Dave Baker	Safety	Oklahoma
1	8	8	Dan James	Offensive tackle	Ohio State
2	5	17	Bob Harrison	Defensive tackle	Oklahoma
3	5	29	Eddie Dove	Cornerback	Colorado
4	5	41	Monte Clark	Offensive tackle	Southern California
5	6	54	Frank Geremia	Tackle	Notre Dame
6	6	66	Tony Bavaro	Tackle	Holy Cross
7	2	74	Don Rogers	Tackle	South Carolina
7	6	78	Daniel Colchico	Defensive end	San Jose State
8	6	90	Lew Aiken	End	Vanderbilt
9	6	102	Bobby Joe Green	Punter	Florida
10	6	114	Bronko Nagurski Jr.	Offensive tackle	Notre Dame
11	6	126	Jack Hayes	Back	Trinity (TX)
12	6	138	Bill Korutz	Center	Dayton
13	6	150	Bill Lopasky	Guard	West Virginia
14	6	162	Mike Dukes	Linebacker	Clemson
15	6	174	Joe Belland	Back	Arizona State
16	6	186	Bob Cook	Back	Idaho State
17	6	198	Jerome Jurczak	Center	Benedictine
18	6	210	Jack Cowley	Tackle	Trinity (TX)
19	6	222	Tom Osborne	Wide receiver	Hastings
20	6	234	Toby Deese	Tackle	Georgia Tech
21	6	246	Luther Carr	Back	Washington
22	6	258	Burnio McQueen	End	North Carolina A&T
23	6	270	Bruce Dollahan	Tackle	Illinois
24	6	282	Craig Chudy	End	UCLA
25	6	294	Roy Gee	Guard	Trinity (TX)
26	6	306	Ed Young	End	Louisville
27	6	318	Mel Semenko	Tackle	Colorado
28	6	330	Mike McCluskey	Back	Washington
29	6	342	Jack Bolton	Tackle	Puget Sound
30	6	354	Bob Carter	Tackle	Denver

== 1960 draft ==
Round	Pick #	Overall	Name	Position	College
1	11	11	Monty Stickles	Tight end	Notre Dame
2	4	16	Mike Magac	Guard	Missouri
2	10	22	Carl Kammerer	Defensive end	Pacific
3	11	35	Rod Breedlove	Linebacker	Maryland
4	10	46	Ray Norton	Running back	San Jose State
5	11	59	Len Rohde	Offensive tackle	Utah State
6	10	70	Ola Lee Murchison	End	Pacific
7	11	83	Bobby Waters	Quarterback	Presbyterian
8	4	88	Bill Mathis	Running back	Clemson
8	10	94	Max Fugler	Center	Louisiana State
9	11	107	Bobby Wasden	End	Auburn
10	10	118	Mel Branch	Defensive end	Louisiana State
11	6	126	Ed Pitts	Tackle	South Carolina
11	11	131	Ernie Hansen	Center	Northern Arizona
12	10	142	Jim Williams	Guard	North Carolina
13	11	155	Dean Hinshaw	Tackle	Stanford
14	10	166	Gary Campbell	Back	Whittier
15	11	179	Mike Dowdle	Linebacker	Texas
16	10	190	Jim Heinke	Tackle	Wisconsin
17	11	203	Goose Gonsoulin	Safety	Baylor
18	10	214	Carl Robinson	Tackle	South Carolina State
19	11	227	Bobby Pate	Back	Presbyterian
20	10	238	Jim Woodward	Tackle	Lamar

== 1961 draft ==
Round	Pick #	Overall	Name	Position	College
1	6	6	Jimmy Johnson	Cornerback	UCLA
1	9	9	Bernie Casey	Wide receiver	Bowling Green
1	11	11	Billy Kilmer	Quarterback	UCLA
2	10	24	Roland Lakes	Defensive tackle	Wichita State
3	9	37	Bill Cooper	Fullback	Muskingum
4	5	47	Aaron Thomas	Tight end	Oregon State
4	10	52	Dale Messer	Back	Fresno State
5	2	58	Clark Miller	Defensive end	Utah State
5	9	65	Bob McCreary	Tackle	Wake Forest
6	10	80	Mike McClellan	Back	Oklahoma
7	9	93	Ray Purdin	Back	Northwestern
8	10	108	Neill Plumley	Tackle	Oregon
9	6	118	Leon Donohue	Tackle	San Jose State
9	9	121	Everisto Nino	Tackle	East Texas State
10	10	136	Paul Hynes	Back	Louisiana Tech
11	9	149	Tony Parrilli	Guard	Illinois
12	10	164	Don Coffey	End	Memphis State
13	6	174	Tommy Hackler	End	Tennessee Tech
13	9	177	Julius Fincke	Tackle	McNeese State
14	10	192	Bill Worrell	Tackle	Georgia
15	9	205	Bob Sams	Tackle	Central State (OK)
16	10	220	Charley Fuller	Running back	San Francisco State
17	9	233	Tom Jewell	Tackle	Idaho State
18	10	248	Kay McFarland	Wide receiver	Colorado State
19	9	261	Tom Simpson	Tackle	Davidson
20	10	276	Jerry Perry	Guard	Central State (OK)

== 1962 draft ==
Round	Pick #	Overall	Name	Position	College
1	8	8	Lance Alworth	Wide receiver	Arkansas
2	8	22	Ed Pine	Linebacker	Utah
3	8	36	Billy Ray Adams	Back	Mississippi
4	4	46	Chuck Sieminski	Tackle	Penn State
4	8	50	Floyd Dean	Tackle	Florida
5	6	62	Ted Woods	Running back	Colorado
5	8	64	Mike Lind	Fullback	Notre Dame
6	1	71	Keith Luhnow	Back	Santa Ana
6	6	76	Jerry Brown	Guard	Mississippi
6	8	78	Bill Winter	Tackle	West Virginia
7	8	92	John Burrell	Wide receiver	Rice
8	8	106	Jim Vollenweider	Running back	Miami (FL)
9	8	120	Jim Roberts	Tackle	Mississippi
10	8	134	Regis Coustillac	Guard	Pittsburgh
11	8	148	Larry Jepson	Center	Furman
12	8	162	Milton McPike	End	Northeast Missouri State
13	8	176	George Pierovich	Back	California
14	8	190	Dick Easterly	Back	Syracuse
15	8	204	Ray Osborne	Tackle	Mississippi State
16	8	218	Ron Frank	Tackle	South Dakota State
17	8	232	Wall Foltz	End	DePauw
18	8	246	Gary Brown	Tackle	Illinois
19	8	260	Robert Burton	Tackle	Murray State
20	8	274	Roger McFarland	Back	Kansas

== 1963 draft ==
Round	Pick #	Overall	Name	Position	College
1	8	8	Kermit Alexander	Cornerback	UCLA
2	7	21	Walt Rock	Offensive tackle	Maryland
3	8	36	Don Lisbon	Running back	Bowling Green
4	4	46	Harrison Rosdahl	Guard	Penn State
4	8	50	Hugh Campbell	Wide receiver	Washington State
5	8	64	Vern Burke	Tight end	Oregon State
5	9	65	Jim "Preacher" Pilot	Back	New Mexico State
5	10	66	Gary Moeller	Guard	Ohio State
6	7	77	Pat Emerick	Guard	Western Michigan
7	8	92	Ernest DeCourley	Tackle	Moorhead State
8	7	105	Roger Locke	End	Arizona State
9	8	120	John Maczuzak	Defensive end	Pittsburgh
10	7	133	Dick Lopour	Back	Huron
11	8	148	Steve Shafer	Back	Utah State
12	7	161	Bob Benton	Tackle	Mississippi State
13	8	176	Dick Schultz	Tackle	Ohio
14	7	189	Bill Tobin	Running back	Missouri
15	8	204	Oliver Ross	Back	West Texas State
16	7	217	Jim Bogdalek	Tackle	Toledo
17	8	232	Ken Reed	Guard	Tulsa
18	7	245	John Sellers	Tackle	Bakersfield College
19	8	260	Bob Price	Guard	North Texas State
20	7	273	Don Davis	Back	McMurry

== 1964 draft ==
Round	Pick #	Overall	Name	Position	College
1	1	1	Dave Parks	Wide receiver	Texas Tech
2	1	15	George Mira	Quarterback	Miami (FL)
3	1	29	Dave Wilcox	Linebacker	Oregon
4	1	43	Jim Wilson	Offensive tackle	Georgia
5	1	57	Rudy Johnson	Back	Nebraska
6	1	71	Gary Lewis	Fullback	Arizona State
7	1	85	Hagood Clarke	Safety	Florida
8	1	99	Bob Daugherty	Running back	Tulsa
8	4	102	Bob Poole	Tight end	Clemson
9	1	113	Howard Mudd	Guard	Hillsdale
10	1	127	Fred Polser	Tackle	East Texas State
11	1	141	Dennis Almquist	Guard	Idaho
12	1	155	Jim Long	Back	Fresno State
13	1	169	Bob Brown	Tackle	Arkansas A&M
14	1	183	Ed Beard	Linebacker	Tennessee
15	1	197	Jim Griffin	End	Grambling
16	1	211	Cornell Gordon	Defensive back	North Carolina A&T
17	1	225	Ken Brusven	Tackle	Oregon State
18	1	239	Jerry Cole	End	Texas State
19	1	253	Larry Rawson	Back	Auburn
20	1	267	Gene Baker	Guard	Whitworth

== 1965 draft ==
Round	Pick #	Overall	Name	Position	College
1	2	2	Ken Willard	Fullback	North Carolina
1	13	13	George Donnelly	Safety	Illinois
2	2	16	Joe Cerne	Center	Northwestern
3	1	29	Bob Schweickert	Wide receiver	Virginia
3	2	30	Jim Norton	Defensive tackle	Washington
3	14	42	Jack Chapple	Linebacker	Stanford
4	2	44	Larry Todd	Wide receiver	Arizona State
5	2	58	Dave McCormick	Tackle	Louisiana State
9	2	114	Wayne Swinford	Back	Georgia
10	2	128	Bob Cappadona	Fullback	Northeastern
11	2	142	Steve Mass	Tackle	Detroit
12	2	156	Dave Plump	Wide receiver	Fresno State
13	2	170	Gregg Schumacher	Defensive end	Illinois
14	2	184	Frank Andruski	Defensive back	Utah
15	2	198	Joe Pabian	Tackle	West Virginia
16	2	212	Dave Hettema	Tackle	New Mexico
17	2	226	Len Frketich	End	Oregon State
18	2	240	Leon Standridge	End	San Diego State
19	2	254	Dale Ford	Running back	Washington State
20	2	268	Dennis Duncan	Back	Louisiana College

== 1966 draft ==
Round	Pick #	Overall	Name	Position	College
1	11	11	Stan Hindman	Defensive tackle	Mississippi
2	10	26	Bob Windsor	Tight end	Kentucky
3	5	37	Al Randolph	Safety	Iowa
3	9	41	Dan Bland	Defensive back	Mississippi State
4	8	56	Don Parker	Guard	Virginia
5	5	69	Mel Phillips	Safety	North Carolina A&T
5	7	71	Steve Smith	Wide receiver	Michigan
6	11	91	Charlie Johnson	Defensive tackle	Louisville
8	9	119	Dick Witcher	Wide receiver	UCLA
9	8	133	Kent Kramer	Tight end	Minnesota
10	7	147	Ron Sbranti	Linebacker	Utah State
11	11	166	Preston Ridlehuber	Running back	Georgia
12	10	180	Lyle Loebach	Tackle	Simpson
13	9	194	Jim Jackson	Running back	Western Illinois
14	8	208	Elmer Collett	Guard	San Francisco State
15	7	222	Saint Saffold	Wide receiver	San Jose State
16	11	241	Jim LeClair	Quarterback	C.W. Post
17	10	255	Jim Breeland	Center	Georgia Tech
18	9	269	Ron Parson	Wide receiver	Austin Peay
19	8	283	Dick Fitzgerald	Tackle	Nebraska
20	7	297	Willie Walker	Wide receiver	Baylor

== 1967 draft ==
Round	Pick #	Overall	Name	Position	College
1	3	3	Steve Spurrier	Quarterback	Florida
1	11	11	Cas Banaszek	Offensive tackle	Northwestern
2	13	39	Tom Holzer	Defensive end	Louisville
3	9	62	Frank Nunley	Linebacker	Michigan
3	12	65	Bill Tucker	Running back	Tennessee A&I
4	11	91	Wayne Trimble	Defensive back	Alabama
6	12	145	Doug Cunningham	Running back	Mississippi
7	11	170	Milt Jackson	Defensive back	Tulsa
8	13	198	Walter Johnson	Linebacker	Tuskegee
9	12	223	Bob Briggs	Defensive end	Heidelberg
10	11	248	Chip Myers	Wide receiver	Northwestern Oklahoma
11	13	276	Ken Karmann	Defensive tackle	Kearney State
12	11	301	James Hall	Linebacker	Tuskegee
13	10	325	Rich Gibbs	Defensive back	Iowa
14	13	354	Dalton Leblanc	Wide receiver	Northeast Louisiana
15	12	379	Clarence Spencer	Wide receiver	Louisville
16	11	404	Bart Templeman	Center	Eastern Montana
17	13	432	Danny Talbott	Quarterback	North Carolina

== 1968 draft ==
Round	Pick #	Overall	Name	Position	College
1	15	15	Forrest Blue	Center	Auburn
3	10	65	Lance Olssen	Offensive tackle	Purdue
3	14	69	Skip Vanderbundt	Linebacker	Oregon State
4	15	98	Johnny Fuller	Safety	Lamar
5	14	125	Dwight Lee	Running back	Michigan State
6	3	141	Leo Johnson	Wide receiver	Tennessee State
6	15	153	Bill Belk	Defensive end	Maryland State
7	14	179	Jerry Richardson	Linebacker	Mississippi
8	14	206	Charley Brown	Tackle	Augustana (SD)
8	15	207	Tom Gray	Wide receiver	Morehead State
9	14	233	Case Boyett	Wide receiver	Brigham Young
10	15	261	Tommy Hart	Defensive end	Morris Brown
11	14	287	Dennis Fitzgibbons	Guard	Syracuse
12	15	315	Henry Johnson	Quarterback	Fisk
13	14	341	Tom Mitrakos	Center	Pittsburgh
14	15	369	Alex Moore	Running back	Norfolk State
15	14	395	Clarence Spencer	Wide receiver	Louisville
16	15	423	Tom Rosenow	Defensive tackle	Northern Illinois
17	14	449	Dennis Patera	Kicker	Brigham Young

== 1969 draft ==
Round	Pick #	Overall	Name	Position	College
1	7	7	Ted Kwalick	Tight end	Penn State
1	16	16	Gene Washington	Wide receiver	Stanford
4	8	86	Jim Sniadecki	Linebacker	Indiana
4	16	94	Gene Moore	Running back	Occidental
5	16	120	Earl Edwards	Defensive tackle	Wichita State
6	16	146	Jimmy Thomas	Running back	Texas-Arlington
7	16	172	S. Van Sinderen	Tackle	Washington State
8	16	198	Mike Loper	Tackle	Brigham Young
9	16	224	Hilton Crawford	Safety	Grambling
10	16	250	Dave Chapple	Kicker	UC Santa Barbara
11	16	276	Willie Peake	Tackle	Alcorn State
12	16	302	Jack O'Malley	Tackle	Southern California
13	11	328	Paul Champlin	Defensive back	Eastern Montana
14	16	354	Tom Black	Wide receiver	East Texas State
15	16	380	Gary Golden	Defensive back	Texas Tech
16	16	406	Bob Hoskins	Defensive tackle	Wichita State
17	16	432	Joe Rushing	Linebacker	Memphis

== 1970 draft ==
Round	Pick #	Overall	Name	Position	College
1	9	9	Cedrick Hardman	Defensive end	North Texas State
1	17	17	Bruce Taylor	Cornerback	Boston University
2	22	48	John Isenbarger	Running back	Indiana
4	9	87	Vic Washington	Running back	Wyoming
5	9	113	Gary McArthur	Tackle	Southern California
6	9	139	Rusty Clark	Quarterback	Houston
7	9	165	Jim Strong	Running back	Houston
8	9	191	Carter Campbell	Linebacker	Weber State
9	9	217	Preston Riley	Wide receiver	Memphis State
10	9	243	Larry Schreiber	Running back	Tennessee Tech
11	9	269	Danny Crockett	Wide receiver	Toledo
12	9	295	Bill Tant	Tackle	Dayton
13	9	321	Jim Vanderslice	Linebacker	Texas Christian
14	9	347	Jack King	Guard	Clemson
15	9	373	Dave Delsignore	Wide receiver	Youngstown State
16	9	399	Scott Perkins	Defensive back	Livingstone College
17	9	425	Mike Culton	Punter	La Verne

== 1971 draft ==
Round	Pick #	Overall	Name	Position	College
1	23	23	Tim Anderson	Defensive back	Ohio State
2	11	37	Ernie Janet	Guard	Washington
2	23	49	Joe Orduna	Running back	Nebraska
3	3	55	Sam Dickerson	Wide receiver	Southern California
3	23	75	Willie Parker	Center	North Texas State
4	23	101	Tony Harris	Running back	Toledo
5	10	114	Dean Shaternick	Tackle	Kansas State
5	18	122	George Wells	Linebacker	New Mexico State
5	23	127	Marty Huff	Linebacker	Michigan
6	23	153	Al Bresler	Wide receiver	Auburn
7	23	179	John Watson	Offensive tackle	Oklahoma
8	23	205	Jim McCann	Kicker	Arizona State
9	23	231	Therman Couch	Linebacker	Iowa State
10	2	236	Ron Cardo	Running back	Wisconsin–Oshkosh
10	23	257	Ernie Jennings	Wide receiver	Air Force
11	23	283	Joe Reed	Quarterback	Mississippi State
12	23	309	Jim Bunch	Defensive tackle	Wisconsin–Platteville
13	23	335	John Bullock	Running back	Purdue
14	23	361	Bill Dunstan	Defensive end	Utah State
15	23	387	John Lennon	Tackle	Colgate
16	24	414	Dave Purcell	Defensive tackle	Kentucky
17	22	438	Leroy Charlton	Defensive back	Florida A&M

== 1972 draft ==
Round	Pick #	Overall	Name	Position	College
1	19	19	Terry Beasley	Wide receiver	Auburn
2	2	28	Ralph McGill	Safety	Tulsa
2	18	44	Jean Barrett	Offensive tackle	Tulsa
3	19	71	Allen Dunbar	Wide receiver	Southern
4	18	96	Windlan Hall	Cornerback	Arizona State
5	19	123	Mike Greene	Linebacker	Georgia
6	18	148	Jackie Walker	Defensive back	Tennessee
7	19	175	Edgar Hardy	Guard	Jackson State
8	18	200	Tom Wittum	Punter	Northern Illinois
9	19	227	Jerry Brown	Defensive back	Northwestern
10	18	252	Steve Williams	Defensive tackle	Western Carolina
11	19	279	Tom Laputica	Defensive end	Southern Illinois
12	18	304	Steve Setzler	Defensive end	St. John's
13	19	331	Leon Pettigrew	Tackle	San Fernando Valley State
14	18	356	Eric Guthrie	Quarterback	Boise State
15	19	383	Bob Maddox	Defensive tackle	Frostburg State
16	18	408	Ron Davis	Guard	Virginia
17	19	435	Ted Alexander	Running back	Langston

== 1973 draft ==
Round	Pick #	Overall	Name	Position	College
1	18	18	Mike Holmes	Wide receiver	Texas Southern
2	15	41	Willie Harper	Linebacker	Nebraska
5	8	112	Mike Fulk	Linebacker	Indiana
5	18	122	Ed Beverly	Wide receiver	Arizona State
6	19	149	Arthur Moore	Defensive tackle	Tulsa
7	18	174	John Mitchell	Defensive end	Alabama
8	19	201	Dave Atkins	Running back	UTEP
9	18	226	Roger Praetorius	Running back	Syracuse
10	19	253	Charlie Hunt	Linebacker	Florida State
11	18	278	Tom Dahlberg	Running back	Gustavus Adolphus
12	19	305	Larry Pettus	Tackle	Tennessee State
13	18	330	Alan Kelso	Center	Washington
14	19	357	Dennis Morrison	Quarterback	Kansas State
15	18	382	Mike Bettiga	Wide receiver	Humboldt State
16	19	409	Mike Oven	Tight end	Georgia Tech
17	18	434	Bob Erickson	Guard	North Dakota State

== 1974 draft ==
Round	Pick #	Overall	Name	Position	College
1	9	9	Wilbur Jackson	Running back	Alabama
1	10	10	Bill Sandifer	Defensive tackle	UCLA
2	9	35	Keith Fahnhorst	Offensive tackle	Minnesota
2	23	49	Delvin Williams	Running back	Kansas
4	5	83	Clint Haslerig	Wide receiver	Michigan State
4	12	90	Sammy Johnson	Running back	North Carolina
6	8	138	Mike Raines	Defensive tackle	Alabama
7	10	166	Kermit Johnson	Running back	UCLA
8	9	191	Jim Schnietz	Guard	Missouri
9	8	216	Manfred Moore	Running back	Southern California
10	10	244	Glen Gaspard	Linebacker	Texas
11	9	269	Greg Battle	Defensive back	Colorado State
12	8	294	Tom Hull	Linebacker	Penn State
13	10	322	Tom Owen	Quarterback	Wichita State
14	9	347	Walt Williamson	Defensive end	Michigan
15	8	372	Leonard Gray	Tight end	Long Beach State
16	10	400	Jack Conners	Defensive back	Oregon
17	9	425	Levi Stanley	Guard	Hawaii

== 1975 draft ==
Round	Pick #	Overall	Name	Position	College
1	10	10	Jimmy Webb	Defensive tackle	Mississippi State
2	9	35	Greg Collins	Linebacker	Notre Dame
3	19	71	Jeff Hart	Offensive tackle	Oregon State
3	20	72	Steve Mike-Mayer	Kicker	Maryland
3	22	74	Wayne Baker	Defensive tackle	Brigham Young
4	7	85	Cleveland Elam	Defensive tackle	Tennessee State
4	9	87	Frank Oliver	Defensive back	Kentucky State
5	10	114	Wayne Bullock	Running back	Notre Dame
8	9	191	Preston Kendrick	Linebacker	Florida
9	10	218	James Johnson	Defensive back	Tennessee State
9	15	223	Dan Natale	Tight end	Penn State
9	22	230	Caesar Douglas	Tackle	Illinois Wesleyan
10	9	243	Donnie Layton	Running back	South Carolina State
11	10	270	Gene Hernandez	Defensive back	Texas Christian
12	9	295	Rick Worley	Quarterback	Howard Payne
13	10	322	Dale Mitchell	Linebacker	Southern California
14	9	347	David Henson	Wide receiver	Abilene Christian
15	10	374	Rich Lavin	Tight end	Western Illinois

== 1976 draft ==
Round	Pick #	Overall	Name	Position	College
2	14	42	Randy Cross	Guard	UCLA
2	29	57	Eddie Lewis	Defensive back	Kansas
4	8	100	Steve Rivera	Wide receiver	California
5	16	140	Tony Leonard	Cornerback	Virginia Union
6	12	168	Robert Pennywell	Linebacker	Grambling
6	21	177	Scott Bull	Quarterback	Arkansas
7	12	194	Jay Chesley	Defensive back	Vanderbilt
8	14	223	John Ayers	Guard	West Texas State
9	13	250	Ken Harrison	Wide receiver	Southern Methodist
10	10	275	Robin Ross	Tackle	Washington State
11	14	305	Paul Hofer	Running back	Mississippi
12	13	332	Gerald Loper	Guard	Florida
13	12	359	Larry Brumfield	Defensive back	Indiana State
14	14	389	Johnny Miller	Linebacker	Livingstone College
15	13	416	Howard Stidham	Linebacker	Tennessee Tech
16	12	443	Reggie Lewis	Defensive end	San Diego State
17	14	473	Darryl Jenkins	Running back	San Jose State

== 1977 draft ==
Round	Pick #	Overall	Name	Position	College
3	9	65	Elmo Boyd	Wide receiver	Eastern Kentucky
4	16	100	Stan Black	Defensive back	Mississippi State
6	2	141	Mike Burns	Defensive back	Southern California
6	16	155	Jim Harlan	Center	Howard Payne
7	16	183	Jim Van Wagner	Running back	Michigan Tech
9	16	239	David Posey	Kicker	Florida
11	16	295	Brian Billick	Tight end	Brigham Young
12	16	323	Scott Martin	Guard	North Dakota

== 1978 draft ==
Round	Pick #	Overall	Name	Position	College
1	7	7	Ken MacAfee	Tight end	Notre Dame
1	24	24	Dan Bunz	Linebacker	Long Beach State
2	19	47	Walt Downing	Guard	Michigan
3	23	79	Ernie Hughes	Guard	Notre Dame
4	7	91	Terry LeCount	Wide receiver	Florida
5	17	127	Archie Reese	Defensive tackle	Clemson
6	10	148	Elliott Walker	Running back	Pittsburgh
7	9	175	Fred Quillan	Center	Oregon
9	7	229	Herman Redden	Defensive back	Howard
9	11	233	Dean Moore	Linebacker	Iowa
9	27	249	Steve McDaniels	Tackle	Notre Dame
10	10	260	Mike Connell	Punter	Cincinnati
11	9	287	Willie McCray	Defensive end	Troy State
12	8	314	Dan Irons	Tackle	Texas Tech

== 1979 draft ==
Round	Pick #	Overall	Name	Position	College
2	1	29	James Owens	Running back	UCLA
3	26	82	Joe Montana	Quarterback	Notre Dame
5	1	111	Tom Seabron	Linebacker	Michigan
5	9	119	Jerry Aldridge	Running back	Angelo State
6	1	138	Ruben Vaughan	Defensive tackle	Colorado
7	1	166	Phil Francis	Running back	Stanford
9	1	221	Steve Hamilton	Defensive tackle	Missouri
10	1	249	Dwight Clark	Wide receiver	Clemson
10	4	252	Howard Ballage	Defensive back	Colorado
11	1	276	Billy McBride	Defensive back	Tennessee State

== 1980 draft ==
Round	Pick #	Overall	Name	Position	College
1	13	13	Earl Cooper	Fullback	Rice
1	20	20	Jim Stuckey	Defensive tackle	Clemson
2	11	39	Keena Turner	Linebacker	Purdue
3	9	65	Jim Miller	Punter	Mississippi
3	21	77	Craig Puki	Linebacker	Tennessee
4	1	84	Ricky Churchman	Safety	Texas
4	15	98	David Hodge	Linebacker	Houston
5	2	112	Kenneth Times	Defensive tackle	Southern
6	1	139	Herb Williams	Defensive back	Southern
8	17	210	Bobby Leopold	Linebacker	Notre Dame
9	16	237	Dan Hartwig	Quarterback	California Lutheran

== 1981 draft ==
Round	Pick #	Overall	Name	Position	College
1	8	8	Ronnie Lott	Defensive back	Southern California
2	8	36	John Harty	Defensive tackle	Iowa
2	12	40	Eric Wright	Cornerback	Missouri
3	9	65	Carlton Williamson	Safety	Pittsburgh
5	10	121	Lynn Thomas	Cornerback	Pittsburgh
5	11	122	Arrington Jones	Running back	Winston-Salem State
6	9	147	Pete Kugler	Defensive tackle	Penn State
8	10	203	Garry White	Running back	Minnesota
11	10	286	Rob DeBose	Tight end	UCLA
12	9	313	Major Ogilvie	Running back	Alabama
12	18	322	Joe Adams	Quarterback	Tennessee State

== 1982 draft ==
Round	Pick #	Overall	Name	Position	College
2	2	29	Bubba Paris	Offensive tackle	Michigan
5	28	139	Newton Williams	Running back	Arizona State
6	12	151	Vince Williams	Running back	Oregon
7	28	195	Ron Ferrari	Linebacker	Illinois
9	28	251	Bryan Clark	Quarterback	Michigan State
10	18	269	Dana McLemore	Cornerback	Hawaii
10	28	279	Tim Barbian	Defensive tackle	Western Illinois
11	27	306	Gary Gibson	Linebacker	Arizona
12	28	334	Tim Washington	Defensive back	Fresno State

== 1983 draft ==
Round	Pick #	Overall	Name	Position	College
2	21	49	Roger Craig	Running back	Nebraska
3	3	59	Blanchard Montgomery	Linebacker	UCLA
4	6	90	Tom Holmoe	Safety	Brigham Young
5	5	117	Riki Ellison	Linebacker	Southern California
7	7	175	Gary Moten	Linebacker	Southern Methodist
9	5	229	Mike Mularkey	Tight end	Florida
10	8	259	Jeff Merrell	Defensive tackle	Nebraska
11	10	289	Jesse Sapolu	Center	Hawaii

== 1984 draft ==
Round	Pick #	Overall	Name	Position	College
1	24	24	Todd Shell	Linebacker	Brigham Young
2	28	56	John Frank	Tight end	Ohio State
3	17	73	Guy McIntyre	Guard	Georgia
5	9	121	Michael Carter	Defensive tackle	Southern Methodist
5	27	139	Jeff Fuller	Safety	Texas A&M
9	15	239	Lee Miller	Defensive back	Cal State Fullerton
9	24	248	Derrick Harmon	Running back	Cornell
10	23	275	Dave Moritz	Wide receiver	Iowa
11	24	304	Kirk Pendleton	Wide receiver	Brigham Young

== 1984 Supplemental draft ==
Round	Pick #	Overall	Name	Position	Pro Team	College
1	24	24	Derrick Crawford	Wide receiver	Memphis Showboats	Memphis State
2	23	51	Joe Conwell	Offensive tackle	Philadelphia/Baltimore Stars	North Carolina
3	24	80	Mark Schellen	Running back	New Orleans Breakers	Nebraska

== 1985 draft ==
Round	Pick #	Overall	Name	Position	College
1	16	16	Jerry Rice	Wide receiver	Mississippi Valley State
3	19	75	Ricky Moore	Running back	Alabama
5	28	140	Bruce Collie	Offensive tackle	Texas-Arlington
6	28	168	Scott Barry	Quarterback	California-Davis
11	28	308	David Wood	Defensive end	Arizona
12	28	336	Donald Chumley	Defensive tackle	Georgia

== 1986 draft ==
Round	Pick #	Overall	Name	Position	College
2	12	39	Larry Roberts	Defensive end	Alabama
3	1	56	Tom Rathman	Fullback	Nebraska
3	9	64	Tim McKyer	Cornerback	Texas-Arlington
3	21	76	John Taylor	Wide receiver	Delaware State
4	14	96	Charles Haley	Defensive end	James Madison
4	19	101	Steve Wallace	Offensive tackle	Auburn
4	20	102	Kevin Fagan	Defensive end	Miami (FL)
5	21	131	Patrick Miller	Linebacker	Florida
6	24	162	Don Griffin	Cornerback	Middle Tennessee State
8	9	203	Jim Popp	Tight end	Vanderbilt
9	19	240	Tony Cherry	Running back	Oregon
10	18	267	Elliston Stinson	Wide receiver	Rice
10	21	270	Harold Hallman	Defensive tackle	Auburn

== 1987 draft ==
Round	Pick #	Overall	Name	Position	College
1	22	22	Harris Barton	Offensive tackle	North Carolina
1	25	25	Terrence Flagler	Running back	Clemson
2	9	37	Jeff Bregel	Guard	Southern California
5	22	134	Paul Jokisch	Wide receiver	Michigan
6	22	162	Bob White	Linebacker	Penn State
7	21	189	Steve DeLine	Kicker	Colorado State
8	22	217	David Grayson	Linebacker	Fresno State
9	22	245	Jonathan Shelley	Defensive back	Mississippi
10	24	275	John Paye	Quarterback	Stanford
11	22	301	Calvin Nicholas	Wide receiver	Grambling

== 1988 draft ==
Round	Pick #	Overall	Name	Position	College
2	6	33	Danny Stubbs	Defensive end	Miami (FL)
2	12	39	Pierce Holt	Defensive end	Angelo State
3	25	80	Bill Romanowski	Linebacker	Boston College
4	20	102	Barry Helton	Punter	Colorado
7	26	191	Kevin Bryant	Linebacker	Delaware State
8	26	219	Larry Clarkson	Offensive tackle	Montana
9	26	247	Brian Bonner	Linebacker	Minnesota
10	26	275	Tim Foley	Kicker	Georgia Southern
11	26	303	Chet Brooks	Safety	Texas A&M
12	26	331	George Mira Jr.	Linebacker	Miami (FL)

== 1989 draft ==
Round	Pick #	Overall	Name	Position	College
1	28	28	Keith DeLong	Linebacker	Tennessee
2	28	56	Wesley Walls	Tight end	Mississippi
3	28	84	Keith Henderson	Running back	Georgia
4	28	112	Mike Barber	Wide receiver	Marshall
5	10	122	Johnnie Jackson	Cornerback	Houston
6	28	167	Steve Hendrickson	Linebacker	California
9	28	251	Rudy Harmon	Linebacker	Louisiana State
10	28	279	Andy Sinclair	Center	Stanford
11	10	289	Jim Bell	Running back	Boston College
11	28	307	Norm McGee	Wide receiver	North Dakota
12	12	319	Antonio Goss	Linebacker	North Carolina

== 1990 draft ==
Round	Pick #	Overall	Name	Position	College
1	25	25	Dexter Carter	Running back	Florida State
2	22	47	Dennis Brown	Defensive end	Washington
2	28	53	Eric Davis	Cornerback	Jacksonville State
3	15	68	Ron Lewis	Wide receiver	Florida State
4	11	92	Dean Caliguire	Center	Pittsburgh
6	28	165	Frank Pollack	Offensive tackle	Northern Arizona
8	27	220	Dwight Pickens	Wide receiver	Fresno State
9	28	248	Odell Haggins	Defensive tackle	Florida State
10	28	276	Martin Harrison	Defensive end	Washington
11	13	289	Anthony Shelton	Safety	Tennessee State

== 1991 draft ==
Round	Pick #	Overall	Name	Position	College
1	25	25	Ted Washington	Defensive tackle	Louisville
2	18	45	Ricky Watters	Running back	Notre Dame
2	26	53	John Johnson	Linebacker	Clemson
4	12	95	Mitch Donahue	Linebacker	Wyoming
5	11	122	Merton Hanks	Safety	Iowa
5	26	137	Harry Boatswain	Offensive tackle	New Haven
6	26	165	Scott Bowles	Offensive tackle	North Texas
7	26	193	Sheldon Canley	Running back	San Jose State
8	26	221	Tony Hargain	Wide receiver	Oregon Tech
9	25	248	Louis Riddick	Safety	Pittsburgh
10	26	276	Byron Holdbrooks	Defensive tackle	Alabama
11	26	304	Bobby Slaughter	Wide receiver	Louisiana Tech
12	26	332	Cliff Confer	Defensive end	Michigan State

== 1992 draft ==
Round	Pick #	Overall	Name	Position	College
1	18	18	Dana Hall	Safety	Washington
2	17	45	Amp Lee	Running back	Florida State
3	20	76	Brian Bollinger	Guard	North Carolina
4	5	89	Mark Thomas	Defensive end	North Carolina State
6	11	151	Damien Russell	Safety	Virginia Tech
9	18	242	Darian Hagan	Quarterback	Colorado
10	17	269	Corey Mayfield	Defensive end	Oklahoma
11	20	300	Tom Covington	Tight end	Georgia Tech
12	19	327	Matt LaBounty	Defensive end	Oregon

== 1993 draft ==
Round	Pick #	Overall	Name	Position	College
1	26	26	Dana Stubblefield	Defensive tackle	Kansas
1	27	27	Todd Kelly	Defensive end	Tennessee
2	19	48	Adrian Hardy	Defensive back	Northwestern State
5	4	116	Artie Smith	Defensive end	Louisiana Tech
6	26	166	Chris Dalman	Guard	Stanford
7	26	194	Troy Wilson	Defensive end	Pittsburg State
8	23	219	Elvis Grbac	Quarterback	Michigan

== 1994 draft ==
Round	Pick #	Overall	Name	Position	College
1	7	7	Bryant Young	Defensive tackle	Notre Dame
1	28	28	William Floyd	Fullback	Florida State
2	24	53	Kevin Mitchell	Linebacker	Syracuse
2	33	62	Tyronne Drakeford	Cornerback	Virginia Tech
3	20	85	Doug Brien	Kicker	California
3	22	87	Cory Fleming	Wide receiver	Tennessee
5	22	153	Anthony Peterson	Linebacker	Notre Dame
6	21	182	Lee Woodall	Linebacker	West Chester

== 1995 draft ==
Round	Pick #	Overall	Name	Position	College
1	10	10	J. J. Stokes	Wide receiver	UCLA
4	29	127	Tim Hanshaw	Tight end	Brigham Young
6	30	201	Antonio Armstrong	Linebacker	Texas A&M
7	30	238	Herbert Coleman	Defensive end	Trinity

== 1996 draft ==
Round	Pick #	Overall	Name	Position	College
2	16	46	Israel Ifeanyi	Defensive end	Southern California
3	28	89	Terrell Owens	Wide receiver	Tennessee-Chattanooga
4	33	128	Daryl Price	Defensive end	Colorado
5	28	160	Iheanyi Uwaezuoke	Wide receiver	California
6	31	198	Stephen Pitts	Running back	Penn State
7	30	239	Sean Manuel	Tight end	New Mexico State
7	45	254	Sam Manuel	Linebacker	New Mexico State

== 1997 draft ==
Round	Pick #	Overall	Name	Position	College
1	26	26	Jim Druckenmiller	Quarterback	Virginia Tech
2	25	55	Marc Edwards	Fullback	Notre Dame
3	17	77	Greg Clark	Tight end	Stanford

== 1998 draft ==
Round	Pick #	Overall	Name	Position	College
1	28	28	R. W. McQuarters	Cornerback	Oklahoma State
2	28	58	Jeremy Newberry	Center	California
3	28	89	Chris Ruhman	Offensive tackle	Texas A&M
4	27	119	Lance Schulters	Safety	Hofstra
5	28	151	Phil Ostrowski	Guard	Penn State
6	27	180	Fred Beasley	Fullback	Auburn
7	26	215	Ryan Thelwell	Wide receiver	Minnesota

== 1999 draft ==
Round	Pick #	Overall	Name	Position	College
1	24	24	Reggie McGrew	Defensive tackle	Florida
3	28	89	Chike Okeafor	Defensive end	Purdue
4	4	99	Anthony Parker	Cornerback	Weber State
4	15	110	Pierson Prioleau	Safety	Virginia Tech
5	24	157	Terry Jackson	Fullback	Florida
5	28	161	Tyrone Hopson	Guard	Eastern Kentucky
6	2	171	Tai Streets	Wide receiver	Michigan
7	28	234	Kory Minor	Linebacker	Notre Dame

== 2000 draft ==
Round	Pick #	Overall	Name	Position	College
1	16	16	Julian Peterson	Linebacker	Michigan State
1	24	24	Ahmed Plummer	Cornerback	Ohio State
2	4	35	John Engelberger	Defensive end	Virginia Tech
2	17	48	Jason Webster	Cornerback	Texas A&M
3	3	65	Giovanni Carmazzi	Quarterback	Hofstra
3	24	86	Jeff Ulbrich	Linebacker	Hawaii
4	14	108	John Keith	Safety	Furman
5	3	132	Paul Smith	Fullback	UTEP
5	21	150	John Milem	Defensive end	Lenoir–Rhyne
7	6	212	Tim Rattay	Quarterback	Louisiana Tech
7	24	230	Brian Jennings	Long snapper	Arizona State

== 2001 draft ==
Round	Pick #	Overall	Name	Position	College
1	7	7	Andre Carter	Defensive end	California
2	16	47	Jamie Winborn	Linebacker	Vanderbilt
3	18	80	Kevan Barlow	Running back	Pittsburgh
6	6	169	Cedrick Wilson	Wide receiver	Tennessee
6	16	179	Rashad Holman	Cornerback	Louisville
6	28	191	Menson Holloway	Defensive end	UTEP
7	9	209	Alex Lincoln	Linebacker	Auburn
7	24	224	Eric Johnson	Tight end	Yale

== 2002 draft ==
Round	Pick #	Overall	Name	Position	College
1	27	27	Mike Rumph	Safety	Miami (FL)
3	4	69	Saleem Rasheed	Linebacker	Alabama
4	4	102	Jeff Chandler	Kicker	Florida
4	29	127	Kevin Curtis	Safety	Texas Tech
5	28	163	Brandon Doman	Quarterback	Brigham Young
5	37	172	Josh Shaw	Defensive tackle	Michigan State
6	29	201	Mark Anelli	Tight end	Wisconsin
7	28	239	Eric Heitmann	Center	Stanford
7	38	249	Kyle Kosier	Guard	Arizona State
7	45	256	Teddy Gaines	Defensive back	Tennessee

== 2003 draft ==
Round	Pick #	Overall	Name	Position	College
1	26	26	Kwame Harris	Offensive tackle	Stanford
2	25	57	Anthony Adams	Defensive tackle	Penn State
3	25	89	Andrew Williams	Defensive end	Miami (FL)
4	27	124	Brandon Lloyd	Wide receiver	Illinois
5	26	161	Aaron Walker	Tight end	Florida
6	24	197	Arnaz Battle	Wide receiver	Notre Dame
7	27	241	Ken Dorsey	Quarterback	Miami (FL)

== 2004 draft ==
Round	Pick #	Overall	Name	Position	College
1	31	31	Rashaun Woods	Wide receiver	Oklahoma State
2	14	46	Justin Smiley	Guard	Alabama
2	26	58	Shawntae Spencer	Cornerback	Pittsburgh
3	14	77	Derrick Hamilton	Wide receiver	Clemson
4	8	104	Isaac Sopoaga	Defensive tackle	Hawaii
4	31	127	Richard Seigler	Linebacker	Oregon State
6	23	188	Andy Lee	Punter	Pittsburgh
6	33	198	Keith Lewis	Safety	Oregon
7	16	217	Cody Pickett	Quarterback	Washington
7	25	226	Christian Ferrara	Defensive tackle	Syracuse

== 2005 draft ==
Round	Pick #	Overall	Name	Position	College
1	1	1	Alex Smith	Quarterback	Utah
2	1	33	David Baas	Center	Michigan
3	1	65	Frank Gore	Running back	Miami (FL)
3	30	94	Adam Snyder	Guard	Oregon
5	1	137	Ronald Fields	Defensive tackle	Mississippi State
5	38	174	Rasheed Marshall	Wide receiver	West Virginia
6	31	205	Derrick Johnson	Cornerback	Washington
7	1	215	Daven Holly	Cornerback	Cincinnati
7	9	223	Marcus Maxwell	Wide receiver	Oregon
7	34	248	Patrick Estes	Offensive tackle	Virginia
7	35	249	Billy Bajema	Tight end	Oklahoma State

== 2006 draft ==
Round	Pick #	Overall	Name	Position	College
1	6	6	Vernon Davis	Tight end	Maryland
1	22	22	Manny Lawson	Linebacker	North Carolina State
3	20	84	Brandon Williams	Wide receiver	Wisconsin
4	3	100	Michael Robinson	Running back	Penn State
5	7	140	Parys Haralson	Linebacker	Tennessee
6	6	175	Delanie Walker	Wide receiver	Central Missouri State
6	23	192	Marcus Hudson	Cornerback	North Carolina State
6	28	197	Melvin Oliver	Defensive end	Louisiana State
7	46	254	Vickiel Vaughn	Safety	Arkansas

== 2007 draft ==
Round	Pick #	Overall	Name	Position	College
1	11	11	Patrick Willis	Linebacker	Mississippi
1	28	28	Joe Staley	Offensive tackle	Central Michigan
3	12	76	Jason Hill	Wide receiver	Washington State
3	34	97	Ray McDonald	Defensive end	Florida
4	5	104	Jay Moore	Defensive end	Nebraska
4	27	126	Dashon Goldson	Safety	Washington
4	36	135	Joe Cohen	Defensive tackle	Florida
5	10	147	Tarell Brown	Cornerback	Texas
6	12	186	Thomas Clayton	Running back	Kansas State

== 2008 draft ==
Round	Pick #	Overall	Name	Position	College
1	29	29	Kentwan Balmer	Defensive tackle	North Carolina
2	8	39	Chilo Rachal	Guard	Southern California
3	12	75	Reggie Smith	Safety	Oklahoma
4	8	107	Cody Wallace	Center	Texas A&M
6	8	174	Josh Morgan	Wide receiver	Virginia Tech
7	7	214	Larry Grant	Linebacker	Ohio State

== 2009 draft ==
Round	Pick #	Overall	Name	Position	College
1	10	10	Michael Crabtree	Wide receiver	Texas Tech
3	10	74	Glen Coffee	Running back	Alabama
5	10	146	Scott McKillop	Linebacker	Pittsburgh
5	35	171	Nate Davis	Quarterback	Ball State
6	11	184	Bear Pascoe	Tight end	Fresno State
7	10	219	Curtis Taylor	Safety	Louisiana State
7	35	244	Ricky Jean Francois	Defensive end	Louisiana State

== 2010 draft ==
Round	Pick #	Overall	Name	Position	College
1	11	11	Anthony Davis	Offensive tackle	Rutgers
1	17	17	Mike Iupati	Guard	Idaho
2	17	49	Taylor Mays	Safety	Southern California
3	27	91	NaVorro Bowman	Linebacker	Penn State
6	4	173	Anthony Dixon	Running back	Mississippi State
6	13	182	Nate Byham	Tight end	Pittsburgh
6	37	206	Kyle Williams	Wide receiver	Arizona State
7	17	224	Phillip Adams	Cornerback	South Carolina State

== 2011 draft ==
Round	Pick #	Overall	Name	Position	College
1	7	7	Aldon Smith	Defensive end	Missouri
2	4	36	Colin Kaepernick	Quarterback	Nevada
3	16	80	Chris Culliver	Cornerback	South Carolina
4	18	115	Kendall Hunter	Running back	Oklahoma State
5	32	163	Daniel Kilgore	Guard	Appalachian State
6	17	182	Ronald Johnson	Wide receiver	USC
6	25	190	Colin Jones	Safety	Texas Christian
7	8	211	Bruce Miller	Fullback	Central Florida
7	36	239	Mike Person	Guard	Montana State
7	47	250	Curtis Holcomb	Cornerback	Florida A&M

== 2012 draft ==
Round	Pick #	Overall	Name	Position	College
1	30	30	A. J. Jenkins	Wide receiver	Illinois
2	29	61	LaMichael James	Running back	Oregon
4	22	117	Joe Looney	Guard	Wake Forest
5	30	165	Darius Fleming	Linebacker	Notre Dame
6	10	180	Trenton Robinson	Safety	Michigan State
6	29	199	Jason Slowey	Center	Western Oregon
7	30	237	Cam Johnson	Defensive end	Virginia

== 2013 draft ==
Round	Pick #	Overall	Name	Position	College
1	18	18	Eric Reid	Safety	LSU
2	8	40	Cornellius Carradine	Defensive end	Florida State
2	23	55	Vance McDonald	Tight end	Rice
3	26	88	Corey Lemonier	Defensive end	Auburn
4	31	128	Quinton Patton	Wide receiver	Louisiana Tech
4	34	131	Marcus Lattimore	Running back	South Carolina
5	24	157	Quinton Dial	Defensive tackle	Alabama
6	12	180	Nick Moody	Linebacker	Florida State
7	31	237	B. J. Daniels	Quarterback	South Florida
7	40	246	Carter Bykowski	Offensive tackle	Iowa State
7	46	252	Marcus Cooper	Cornerback	Rutgers

== 2014 draft ==
Round	Pick #	Overall	Name	Position	College
1	30	30	Jimmie Ward	Safety	Northern Illinois
2	25	57	Carlos Hyde	Running back	Ohio State
3	6	70	Marcus Martin	Center	USC
3	13	77	Chris Borland	Linebacker	Wisconsin
3	36	100	Brandon Thomas	Offensive tackle	Clemson
4	6	106	Bruce Ellington	Wide receiver	South Carolina
4	29	129	Dontae Johnson	Cornerback	North Carolina State
5	10	150	Aaron Lynch	Defensive end	South Florida
5	30	170	Keith Reaser	Cornerback	Florida Atlantic
6	4	180	Kenneth Acker	Cornerback	SMU
7	28	243	Kaleb Ramsey	Defensive end	Boston College
7	30	245	Trey Millard	Fullback	Oklahoma

== 2015 draft ==
Round	Pick #	Overall	Name	Position	College
1	17	17	Arik Armstead	Defensive end	Oregon
2	14	46	Jaquiski Tartt	Safety	Samford
3	15	79	Eli Harold	Defensive end	Virginia
4	18	117	Blake Bell	Tight end	Oklahoma
4	27	126	Mike Davis	Running back	South Carolina
4	33	132	DeAndre Smelter	Wide receiver	Georgia Tech
5	29	165	Bradley Pinion	Punter	Clemson
6	14	190	Ian Silberman	Guard	Boston College
7	27	244	Trenton Brown	Guard	Florida
7	37	254	Rory Anderson	Tight end	South Carolina

== 2016 draft ==
Round	Pick #	Overall	Name	Position	College
1	7	7	DeForest Buckner	Defensive end	Oregon
1	28	28	Joshua Garnett	Guard	Stanford
3	5	68	Will Redmond	Cornerback	Mississippi State
4	35	133	Rashard Robinson	Cornerback	LSU
5	3	142	Ronald Blair	Defensive end	Appalachian State
5	6	145	John Theus	Offensive tackle	Georgia
5	35	172	Fahn Cooper	Offensive tackle	Ole Miss
6	32	207	Jeff Driskel	Quarterback	Louisiana Tech
6	36	211	Kelvin Taylor	Running back	Florida
6	38	213	Aaron Burbridge	Wide receiver	Michigan State
7	28	249	Prince Charles Iworah	Cornerback	Western Kentucky

== 2017 draft ==
Round	Pick #	Overall	Name	Position	College
1	3	3	Solomon Thomas	Defensive end	Stanford
1	31	31	Reuben Foster	Linebacker	Alabama
3	2	66	Ahkello Witherspoon	Cornerback	Colorado
3	40	104	C. J. Beathard	Quarterback	Iowa
4	15	121	Joe Williams	Running back	Utah
5	2	146	George Kittle	Tight end	Iowa
5	34	177	Trent Taylor	Wide receiver	Louisiana Tech
6	14	198	D. J. Jones	Defensive tackle	Ole Miss
6	18	202	Pita Taumoepenu	Linebacker	Utah
7	11	229	Adrian Colbert	Defensive back	Miami

== 2018 draft ==
Round	Pick #	Overall	Name	Position	College
1	9	9	Mike McGlinchey	Offensive tackle	Notre Dame
2	12	44	Dante Pettis	Wide receiver	Washington
3	6	70	Fred Warner	Linebacker	BYU
3	31	95	Tarvarius Moore	Safety	Southern Miss
4	28	128	Kentavius Street	Defensive end	North Carolina State
5	5	142	D. J. Reed	Cornerback	Kansas State
6	10	184	Marcell Harris	Safety	Florida
7	5	223	Jullian Taylor	Defensive tackle	Temple
7	22	240	Richie James	Wide receiver	Middle Tennessee State

== 2019 draft ==
Round	Pick #	Overall	Name	Position	College
1	2	2	Nick Bosa	Defensive end	Ohio State
2	4	36	Deebo Samuel	Wide receiver	South Carolina
3	3	67	Jalen Hurd	Wide receiver	Baylor
4	8	110	Mitch Wishnowsky	Punter	Utah
5	10	148	Dre Greenlaw	Linebacker	Arkansas
6	3	173	Kaden Smith	Tight end	Stanford
6	10	183	Justin Skule	Offensive tackle	Vanderbilt
6	26	198	Tim Harris	Cornerback	Virginia

== 2020 draft ==
Round	Pick #	Overall	Name	Position	College
1	14	14	Javon Kinlaw	Defensive tackle	South Carolina
1	25	25	Brandon Aiyuk	Wide receiver	Arizona State
5	7	153	Colton McKivitz	Offensive tackle	West Virginia
6	11	190	Charlie Woerner	Tight end	Georgia
7	3	217	Jauan Jennings	Wide receiver	Tennessee

== 2021 draft ==
Round	Pick #	Overall	Name	Position	College
1	3	3	Trey Lance	Quarterback	North Dakota State
2	16	48	Aaron Banks	Guard	Notre Dame
3	25	88	Trey Sermon	Running back	Ohio State
3	39	102	Ambry Thomas	Cornerback	Michigan
5	11	155	Jaylon Moore	Offensive tackle	Western Michigan
5	28	172	Deommodore Lenoir	Cornerback	Oregon
5	36	180	Talanoa Hufanga	Safety	USC
6	10	194	Elijah Mitchell	Running back	Louisiana

== 2022 draft ==
Round	Pick #	Overall	Name	Position	College
2	29	61	Drake Jackson	Defensive end	USC
3	29	93	Tyrion Davis-Price	Running back	LSU
3	41	105	Danny Gray	Wide receiver	SMU
4	29	134	Spencer Burford	Guard	UTSA
5	29	172	Samuel Womack	Cornerback	Toledo
6	8	187	Nick Zakelj	Offensive tackle	Fordham
6	42	220	Kalia Davis	Defensive tackle	UCF
6	43	221	Tariq Castro-Fields	Cornerback	Penn State
7	41	262	Brock Purdy	Quarterback	Iowa State

== 2023 draft ==
Round	Pick #	Overall	Name	Position	College
3	24	87	Ji'Ayir Brown	Safety	Penn State
3	36	99	Jake Moody	Kicker	Michigan
3	38	101	Cameron Latu	Tight end	Alabama
5	20	155	Darrell Luter Jr.	Cornerback	South Alabama
5	38	173	Robert Beal Jr.	Outside linebacker	Georgia
6	39	216	Dee Winters	Linebacker	TCU
7	30	247	Brayden Willis	Tight end	Oklahoma
7	36	253	Ronnie Bell	Wide receiver	Michigan
7	38	255	Jalen Graham	Linebacker	Purdue

== 2024 draft ==
Round	Pick #	Overall	Name	Position	College
1	31	31	Ricky Pearsall	Wide receiver	Florida
2	32	64	Renardo Green	Cornerback	Florida State
3	23	86	Dominick Puni	Offensive tackle	Kansas
4	24	124	Malik Mustapha	Safety	Wake Forest
4	29	129	Isaac Guerendo	Running back	Louisville
4	35	135	Jacob Cowing	Wide receiver	Arizona
6	39	215	Jarrett Kingston	Guard	USC
7	31	251	Tatum Bethune	Linebacker	Florida State

== 2025 draft ==
Round	Pick #	Overall	Name	Position	College
1	11	11	Mykel Williams	Defensive end	Georgia
2	11	43	Alfred Collins	Defensive tackle	Texas
3	11	75	Nick Martin	Linebacker	Oklahoma State
3	36	100	Upton Stout	Cornerback	Western Kentucky
4	11	113	CJ West	Defensive tackle	Indiana
4	36	138	Jordan Watkins	Wide receiver	Ole Miss
5	9	147	Jordan James	Running back	Oregon
5	24	160	Marques Sigle	Safety	Kansas State
7	11	227	Kurtis Rourke	Quarterback	Indiana
7	33	249	Connor Colby	Guard	Iowa
7	36	252	Junior Bergen	Wide receiver	Montana

== 2026 draft ==
Round	Pick #	Overall	Name	Position	College
2	1	33	De'Zhaun Stribling	Wide receiver	Ole Miss
3	6	70	Romello Height	Defensive end	Texas Tech
3	26	90	Kaelon Black	Running back	Indiana
4	7	107	Gracen Halton	Defensive tackle	Oklahoma
4	27	127	Carver Willis	Offensive tackle	Washington
4	39	139	Ephesians Prysock	Cornerback	Washington
5	14	154	Jaden Dugger	Linebacker	Louisiana
5	39	179	Enrique Cruz Jr.	Offensive tackle	Kansas
