= John Varone =

American gridiron football player (1936–2011)

No. 85, 15
- Positions: Halfback, Fullback, Linebacker

Personal information
- Born: March 10, 1938; East Boston, Massachusetts, U.S.
- Died: October 11, 2011 (aged 73); Palm Bay, Florida, U.S.
- Listed height: 5 ft 11 in (1.80 m)
- Listed weight: 194 lb (88 kg)

Career information
- High school: East Boston (MA)
- College: University of Miami (1954-1957)
- NFL draft: 1958: 4th round, 46th overall pick

Career history
- 1958–1959: Winnipeg Blue Bombers

Awards and highlights
- 2× Grey Cup champion (1958, 1959)

Career CFL statistics
- Games played: 25
- Rushing yards: 259
- Receiving yards: 158
- Receiving touchdowns: 2
- Interceptions: 2

John Patrick Varone (November 9, 1936 – October 11, 2011) was an American professional Canadian football player who played as a halfback and fullback, as well as a linebacker. Varone played for the Winnipeg Blue Bombers of the Canadian Football League (CFL) from 1958 to 1959.

== Career ==
A native of East Boston, Varone attended East Boston High School and graduated in 1954. He went on to play college football for the University of Miami Hurricanes from 1954 to 1957, under coach Andy Gustafson. The team had a winning record in all of the seasons that Varone played there, but did not win any bowl games.

Varone was selected in the fourth round of the 1958 NFL draft as the 46th pick overall by the San Francisco 49ers, coached by Frankie Albert. He soon signed with the Winnipeg Blue Bombers of the Canadian Football League. In both of his seasons with the Blue Bombers under coach Bud Grant, the team won the Grey Cup. Varone played both on offense and defense as a halfback and linebacker in his first season, then transitioning from halfback to fullback in his second season. He would play in a total of 25 games, tallying 259 rushing yards, 158 receiving yards, 2 receiving touchdowns, and 2 interceptions.

Varone returned to Florida, where he played college football, and became a teacher in 1961 at Miami Norland Senior High School. He remained there until 1989.

A resident of Pembroke Pines and then Palm Bay, Varone died in Florida in 2011 at the age of seventy-three.

== See also ==
- 1958 San Francisco 49ers season
- List of Miami Hurricanes in the NFL draft
- San Francisco 49ers draft history
