= Ted Connolly =

American football player (1931–2014)

- Connolly in 1961

No. 65, 64
- Position: Guard

Personal information
- Born: December 5, 1931; Oakland, California, U.S.
- Died: February 24, 2014 (aged 82); Gardnerville, Nevada, U.S.
- Listed height: 6 ft 3 in (1.91 m)
- Listed weight: 240 lb (109 kg)

Career information
- High school: Piedmont (Piedmont, California)
- College: Santa Clara; Tulsa
- NFL draft: 1954: 9th round, 107th overall pick

Career history
- San Francisco 49ers (1954–1962); Cleveland Browns (1963)

Awards and highlights
- Pro Bowl (1961); All-Missouri Valley team (1953)

Career NFL statistics
- Games played: 91
- Starts: 62
- Fumble recoveries: 1
- Stats at Pro Football Reference

Theodore William Connolly (December 5, 1931 – February 24, 2014) was an American professional football player in the National Football League (NFL) for the San Francisco 49ers from 1954 to 1962 and Cleveland Browns in 1963. He played college football for the Santa Clara Broncos and Tulsa Golden Hurricane.

He earned All-Pro honors and was a member of the 1962 NFL All-Star team as named by The Sporting News.

He originally played in college at Santa Clara University and was an All-American until the Broncos dropped football in 1951. Connolly moved on to the University of Tulsa where he graduated in 1953. While at Tulsa he was named a member of the All-Missouri Valley team as a tackle.

Connolly was selected in the ninth round of the 1954 NFL draft by the San Francisco 49ers, who made him the 107th selection of the year.

While a player, he worked in the off-season as a real estate salesman for the Grubb Real Estate Company of Oakland, California.

Conner died at his home in Gardnerville, Nevada on February 24, 2014, from acute myelocytic leukemia.
