= Jim Norton (defensive lineman) =

American football player (born 1942)

No. 75, 70, 73, 83, 79
- Positions: Defensive lineman, Offensive tackle, End

Personal information
- Born: November 18, 1942; Wilmington, North Carolina, U.S.
- Died: January 12, 2021 (aged 78)
- Listed height: 6 ft 4 in (1.93 m)
- Listed weight: 254 lb (115 kg)

Career information
- High school: Wenatchee (Wenatchee, Washington)
- College: Washington (1961-1964)
- NFL draft: 1965: 3rd round, 30th overall pick

Career history
- San Francisco 49ers (1965–1966); Atlanta Falcons (1967–1968); Philadelphia Eagles (1968); Washington Redskins (1969); New York Giants (1970)

Career NFL statistics
- Fumble recoveries: 5
- Interceptions: 1
- Sacks: 11.5
- Stats at Pro Football Reference

James Alfred Norton (November 18, 1942 – January 12, 2021) was an American professional football defensive lineman in the National Football League (NFL) for the San Francisco 49ers, Atlanta Falcons, Philadelphia Eagles, Washington Redskins, and New York Giants. He played college football at the University of Washington and was selected 30th overall in the third round of the 1965 NFL draft.

Norton died on January 12, 2021, of brain cancer and chronic traumatic encephalopathy.
