= Todd Kelly (American football) =

American football player (born 1970)

No. 58, 98, 96
- Positions: Linebacker, defensive end

Personal information
- Born: November 27, 1970 (age 55); Hampton, Virginia, U.S.
- Listed height: 6 ft 3 in (1.91 m)
- Listed weight: 259 lb (117 kg)

Career information
- High school: Bethel (Hampton)
- College: Tennessee
- NFL draft: 1993: 1st round, 27th overall pick

Career history
- San Francisco 49ers (1993–1994); Cincinnati Bengals (1995–1996); Atlanta Falcons (1996)

Awards and highlights
- Super Bowl champion (XXIX); Third-team All-American (1992); First-team All-SEC (1992)

Career NFL statistics
- Tackles: 27
- Sacks: 5.5
- Forced fumbles: 2
- Stats at Pro Football Reference

Todd Eric Kelly (born November 27, 1970) is an American former professional football player who was a linebacker/defensive end for four seasons in the National Football League (NFL). He was selected in the first round of the 1993 NFL draft by the San Francisco 49ers. He also played for the Cincinnati Bengals and the Atlanta Falcons. He played college football at the University of Tennessee, where he was a captain of the 1992 team, and received All-SEC and All-American AP honors.

== Early life ==
Kelly attended Bethel High School in Hampton, Virginia, where he played football and baseball, and ran track. He played defensive end and tight end for the football team, registering six sacks and five interceptions on defense, and catching 18 passes and scoring five touchdowns on offense during his senior year to win All-State honors. He was timed at 4.5 seconds in the 40-yard dash, which was unusually fast for a defensive lineman.

As a member of the track team, Kelly won the state's high hurdles title as a sophomore, with a best of 14.1 seconds. He received All-State honors in baseball, and was drafted by the Detroit Tigers in the 1989 June Amateur Draft.

== College career ==
Kelly initially committed to South Carolina in 1989, but switched his commitment to Tennessee following the death of South Carolina coach Joe Morrison. Due to a lack of depth on the defensive line, he played in eight games during his freshman year as a backup to veteran Marion Hobby, picking up 6 tackles and a sack. While working with defensive coaches Larry Lacewell and Rex Norris, Kelly remained on the second unit during the 1990 season, picking up 21 tackles (14 solo) and a team-leading 5 sacks. He had two sacks in Tennessee's 45–3 win over Florida, and forced a fumble that led to a score in the Vols' 26–26 tie against Auburn.

During his junior year in 1991, Kelly registered 23 tackles (14 solo) and 5.5 sacks (3rd-highest on the team), playing mostly as a backup to senior Chuck Smith. He had three tackles and a sack in the Vols' 30–21 win over Auburn, and registered four tackles and a sack in the team's loss to Florida. He had a sack and forced a fumble in Tennessee's 25–24 loss to Alabama. He tallied four tackles and a sack in Tennessee's loss to Penn State in the 1992 Fiesta Bowl.

Kelly's first career start came in Tennessee's 1992 season-opening win over Southwest Louisiana, in which he registered three tackles and a sack. He registered 2.5 sacks in Tennessee's 34–31 win over Georgia, and led a rushing defense that held Florida to just 68 yards on the ground in the Vols' 31–14 win over the Gators. He recovered a fumble in the fourth quarter of Tennessee's 17–10 loss to Alabama, and registered a sack in Tennessee's 38–23 win over Boston College in the 1993 Hall of Fame Bowl. He finished the season with 38 tackles (28 solo), a team-leading 11 sacks, and a team-leading 10 tackles-for-loss. He was named All-SEC and first-team All-American at the end of the season.

During his four years at Tennessee, Kelly registered 88 tackles (58 solo), 22.5 sacks, 14 tackles-for-loss, and two forced fumbles. He is fifth on the school's career sacks list, trailing only Derek Barnett (33), Reggie White (32), Leonard Little (28) and Jonathan Brown (25). His 11 sacks in 1992 is tied with Little's 1995 tally for the school's fourth-highest single-season total (only White, Brown, and John Henderson have had more sacks in a season). In October 2014, Kelly was named Tennessee's selection for that year's SEC Football Legends Class.

== Professional career ==
Kelly was selected by the San Francisco 49ers in the first round (27th pick overall) of the 1993 NFL draft. During his rookie year, he played in 14 games and started in five, registering one sack. During the 1994 season, Kelly played in 11 games, and registered 9 tackles and 3.5 sacks. He appeared with the 49ers in the team's 49–26 victory over San Diego in Super Bowl XXIX.

Kelly was cut by the 49ers prior to the 1995 season. He was claimed on waivers a few days later by the Cincinnati Bengals. He appeared in all 16 games for the Bengals in 1995, playing primarily as a speed rusher on passing downs. He was cut by the Bengals prior to the 1996 season, but was re-signed for two games in October. He finished the season with the Atlanta Falcons.

During his four seasons in the NFL, Kelly registered 27 tackles, 5.5 sacks, two forced fumbles, a fumble recovery, and a pass break up.

== Personal life and post-playing career ==
Kelly returned to Knoxville, Tennessee, with his family, following his NFL career. He works as a Commercial Excellence Executive for Boston Scientific (Peripheral Intervention), and served as a youth football coach from 2003 to 2009.

Kelly met his wife, Renee, a former Vol Hostess, at Tennessee in 1989. Their son, Todd Kelly, Jr., was a consensus four-star defensive back at the Webb School of Knoxville, and played for Tennessee from 2014 to 2018 and graduated. Their daughter Clarke was on the All-Girl 2015 National Championship cheerleading team at Alabama and was graduate in 2015 .
