= Bill Sandifer =

American football player (born 1952)

No. 60, 66
- Position: Defensive tackle

Personal information
- Born: January 5, 1952 (age 74); Quantico, Virginia, U.S.
- Listed height: 6 ft 6 in (1.98 m)
- Listed weight: 278 lb (126 kg)

Career information
- High school: Oceanside (Oceanside, California)
- College: UCLA
- NFL draft: 1974: 1st round, 10th overall pick

Career history
- San Francisco 49ers (1974–1976); Seattle Seahawks (1977–1978)

Career NFL statistics
- Games played: 46
- Games started: 26
- Fumble recoveries: 4
- Stats at Pro Football Reference

William Patrick Sandifer (born January 5, 1952) is an American former professional football player who was a defense tackle for five seasons for the San Francisco 49ers and Seattle Seahawks of the National Football League (NFL). He was selected tenth overall by the 49ers in the first round of the 1974 NFL draft.
