= Harry Babcock (American football) =

American football player (1930–1996)

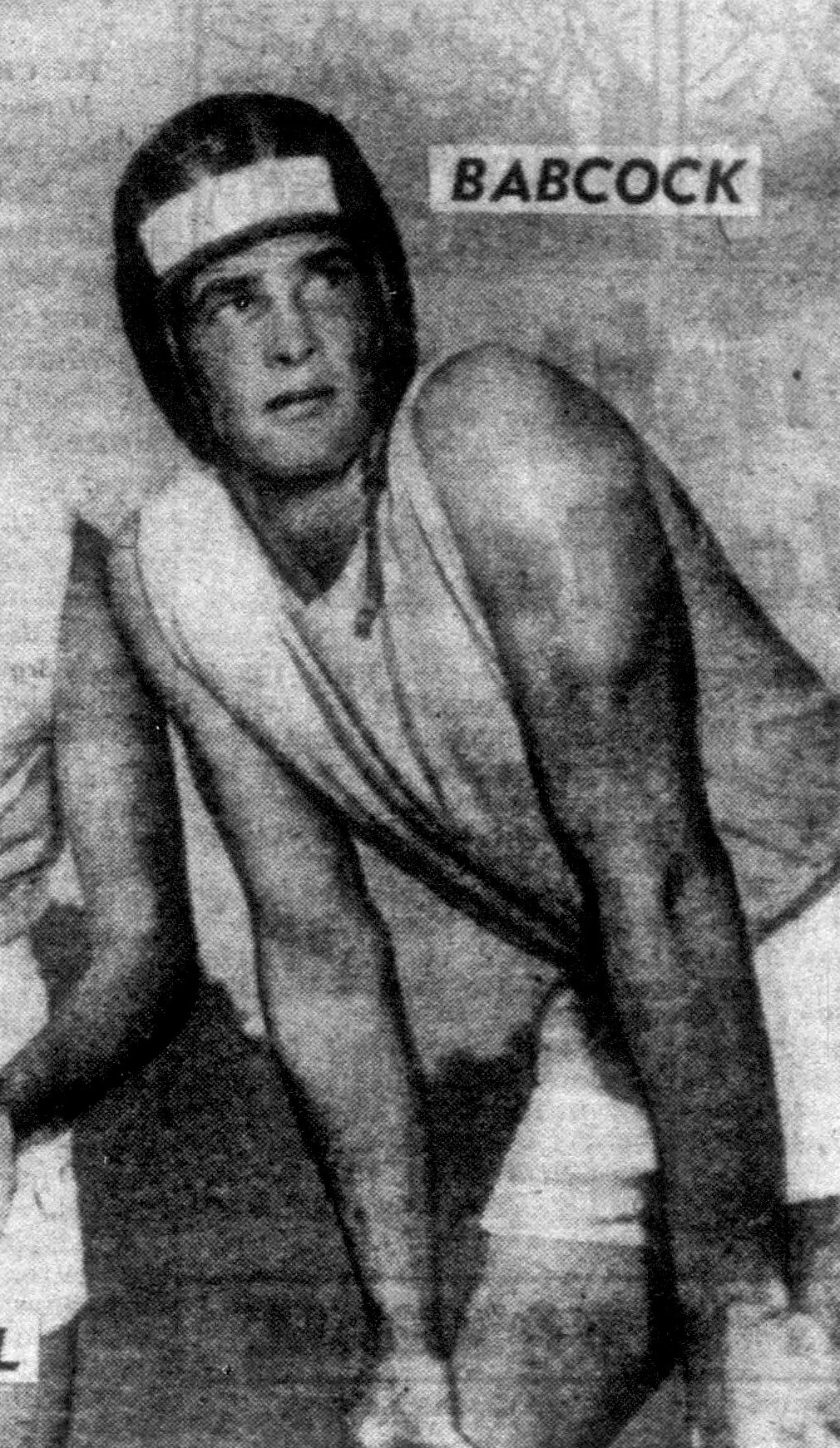
- Babcock, circa 1953

No. 88
- Positions: End, defensive end

Personal information
- Born: August 12, 1930; West Nyack, New York, U.S.
- Died: December 6, 1996 (aged 66); Ocala, Florida, U.S.
- Listed height: 6 ft 2 in (1.88 m)
- Listed weight: 193 lb (88 kg)

Career information
- High school: Pearl River (Pearl River, New York)
- College: Georgia (1949–1952)
- NFL draft: 1953: 1st round, 1st overall pick

Career history
- San Francisco 49ers (1953–1955); Montreal Alouettes (1957)*
- * Offseason or practice squad member only

Awards and highlights
- Second-team All-American (1952); 2× First-team All-SEC (1951, 1952)

Career NFL statistics
- Receptions: 16
- Receiving yards: 181
- Stats at Pro Football Reference

Harry Lewis Babcock (August 12, 1930 – December 6, 1996) was an American professional football end in the National Football League (NFL). He was the first overall selection in the 1953 NFL draft by the San Francisco 49ers.
