= Dan James (American football) =

American football player (1937–1987)

No. 55, 77, 74
- Position: Offensive tackle

Personal information
- Born: August 10, 1937; Cincinnati, Ohio, U.S.
- Died: July 4, 1987 (aged 49); Harrison, Ohio, U.S.
- Listed height: 6 ft 4 in (1.93 m)
- Listed weight: 262 lb (119 kg)

Career information
- High school: Elder (Cincinnati)
- College: Ohio State
- NFL draft: 1959: 1st round, 8th overall pick

Career history
- San Francisco 49ers (1959)*; Pittsburgh Steelers (1960–1966); Chicago Bears (1967)
- * Offseason or practice squad member only

Awards and highlights
- National champion (1957)

Career NFL statistics
- Games played: 93
- Games started: 87
- Stats at Pro Football Reference

Daniel Anthony James (August 10, 1937 – July 4, 1987) was an American professional football offensive lineman for the Pittsburgh Steelers from 1960 to 1966. He played college football at Ohio State University.

James attended Elder High School and the center was selected by the San Francisco 49ers with the eighth pick in the first round of the 1959 NFL draft.

He eventually played for the Steelers and retired in the late 1960s. He then returned home to Cincinnati with his wife and children.
