= Dave Baker (American football) =

American football player (1937–2002)

- Baker in 1961

No. 25
- Position: Safety

Personal information
- Born: July 30, 1937; Coffeyville, Kansas, U.S.
- Died: September 4, 2002 (aged 65); Norman, Oklahoma, U.S.
- Listed height: 6 ft 0 in (1.83 m)
- Listed weight: 192 lb (87 kg)

Career information
- High school: Bartlesville (Bartlesville, Oklahoma)
- College: Oklahoma
- NFL draft: 1959: 1st round, 5th overall pick

Career history
- San Francisco 49ers (1959–1961)

Awards and highlights
- Second-team All-Pro (1960); Pro Bowl (1959)

Career NFL statistics
- Interceptions: 21
- Fumble recoveries: 3
- Sacks: 1
- Stats at Pro Football Reference

Head coaching record
- Regular season: NCAA: 32–57–0 (.360)

Dave Baker (July 30, 1937 – September 4, 2002) was a defensive back in the National Football League (NFL), playing for the San Francisco 49ers for three years.

== Biography ==
David Baker grew up in Bartlesville, Oklahoma, earning All-State honors in football, basketball and baseball. He enrolled at the University of Oklahoma in 1955 under legendary coach Bud Wilkinson. During his three years of eligibility (freshmen were not eligible in 1955), the Sooners went 30–2, were in the midst of their 47-game win streak (still an NCAA record), and won the Big 7 conference title all three years. Players played both ways at the time, Baker playing defensive back, quarterback and running back. In 1959, he was drafted into the NFL as the fifth pick of the first round by the San Francisco 49ers. In the last 40 years of Sooner football (226 NFL draft picks), only Lee Roy Selmon, Billy Sims and Tony Casillas have been drafted higher. Baker played safety for the 49ers for three seasons (1959–1961) and still holds the 49ers interception per season record, making 21 career interceptions, an average of seven per season.

In his 1959 rookie season, he was selected to the NFL All-Pro team. Monte Clark, an All-Pro tackle with the Cleveland Browns and later an NFL head coach, spoke to the 1965-66 SNU basketball team and stated, “In my fifteen-year NFL pro career, David Baker was the hardest hitting and best defensive back I have seen in the NFL.”

After serving two years in the U.S. Army, a return to the NFL to a signed contract seemed imminent, but a different path would be charted. Dr. Roy Cantrell, president of Southern Nazarene University, called, asking for a meeting to discuss with David the possibility of coming to SNU to begin intercollegiate athletics and be a professor of physical education. The position would include being the first athletic director and head basketball coach. Forsaking a lucrative NFL contract and all of its amenities, David and Edna Baker came to Bethany, signed an SNU contract worth $3,600 annually and began a dream.

With no intercollegiate program, no scholarships and no budget, Coach Baker set out with a vision that SNU could become one of America's finest small college athletic programs. At age 27, with a background in the country's finest collegiate football program (OU) and the NFL (49ers), Coach Baker believed that the greatest impact and athletic experience could happen where athletics in a "Christian atmosphere” thrived.

During Coach Baker's tenure (1964–1974) a long list of significant accomplishment occurred: the first two men's basketball seasons had winning marks (men's basketball was the only intercollegiate sport for four years); the Benchwarmer Club was formed in 1968; the first scholarships awarded in 1969; the Redskin Revolution to change the course of sportsmanship in society occurred (a new method of introducing players was introduced, which later was adopted by high school, college and pro teams across America); sports were added to include women's basketball, baseball, women's volleyball, men's and women's tennis.

On the basketball court, the innovation of the big man playing the point on the 3-2 zone defense was introduced in Broadhurst in 1971, to be copied around America at every level. The Spokesman Bicycle Tour group was formed to give hundreds of high school and college age kids a life changing experience in pedaling across America. In 1970, a goal was set to achieve a national title within a decade (it actually occurred in a decade plus one, 1981, in men's basketball under Head Coach Dr. Loren Gresham). Coach Baker set an athletic program on course with the assurance that “all things are possible to him who believes” (Mark 9:23).

== Head coaching record ==
=== College basketball ===
Record table
Season	Team	Overall	Conference	Standing	Postseason
Bethany Nazarene Redskins () (1964–1969)
1964–65	Bethany Nazarene	8–6			
1965–66	Bethany Nazarene	8–9			
1966–67	Bethany Nazarene	0–14			
1967–68	Bethany Nazarene	9–10			
1968–69	Bethany Nazarene	4–15			
Bethany Nazarene:		32–57 (.360)			
Total:		32–57 (.360)			
National champion Postseason invitational champion Conference regular season champion Conference regular season and conference tournament champion Division regular season champion Division regular season and conference tournament champion Conference tournament champion
