= 1971 Green Bay Packers season =

NFL team season

- General manager: Dan Devine
- Head coach: Dan Devine
- Home stadium: Lambeau Field; Milwaukee County Stadium

Results
- Record: 4–8–2
- Division place: 4th NFC Central
- Playoffs: Did not qualify

The 1971 Green Bay Packers season was their 53rd season overall and their 51st season in the National Football League (NFL). The team finished with a 4–8–2 record under first-year coach Dan Devine, earning them a fourth-place finish in the NFC Central division. This was Hall of Fame quarterback Bart Starr's sixteenth and final season as an active player.

== Offseason ==
=== NFL draft ===
1971 Green Bay Packers draft
Round	Pick	Player	Position	College	Notes
1	9	John Brockington *	Running back	Ohio State	from Denver
2	46	Virgil Robinson	Running back	Grambling	
3	62	Charlie Hall	Defensive back	Pittsburgh	
5	116	Donnell Smith	Defensive end	Southern	
5	124	Jim Stillwagon	Linebacker	Ohio State	
6	140	Scott Hunter	Quarterback	Alabama	
7	168	Dave Davis	Wide receiver	Tennessee State	
7	175	James Johnson	Wide receiver	Bishop	
8	193	Win Headley	Center	Wake Forest	
9	218	Barry Mayer	Running back	Minnesota	
10	246	Kevin Hunt	Tackle	Doane	Played with Packers in 1972
11	271	John Lanier	Running back	Parsons	
12	296	Greg Hendren	Guard	California	
13	324	Jack Martin	Running back	Angelo State	
14	348	LeRoy Spears	Defensive end	Moorhead State	
15	374	Len Garrett	Tight end	New Mexico Highlands	
16	402	Jack O'Donnell	Guard	Central State (OK)	
17	427	Monty Johnson	Defensive back	Oklahoma	
Made roster * Made at least one Pro Bowl during career

=== Undrafted free agents ===
1971 undrafted free agents of note
Player	Position	College
Pat Houlton	Guard	St. Norbert
Jim DeLisle	Defensive tackle	Wisconsin
Jim Maier	Running back	St. Norbert
Pat Matthews	Wide receiver	Pacific
John O'Dell	Kicker	Parsons
Tom Watson	Tackle	Northern Michigan

== Personnel ==
=== Staff ===
1971 Green Bay Packers staff
Front office: President – Dominic Olejniczak; Vice President – Richard Bourguignon; Assistant General Manager – Bob Harlan; Director of Player Personnel – Pat Peppler; Head coaches: General Manager/Head Coach – Dan Devine; Offensive coaches: Receivers/Passing Game – Bob Schnelker; Offensive Line – Rollie Dotsch	Defensive coaches: Defensive Line – Dave Hanner; Linebackers – Burt Gustafson; Defensive Backs – Don Doll

=== Roster ===
1971 Green Bay Packers roster
Quarterbacks: 12 Zeke Bratkowski; 16 Scott Hunter; 15 Bart Starr; Running backs: 44 Donny Anderson P; 42 John Brockington; 25 Dave Hampton; 30 Larry Krause; 31 Perry Williams; Wide receivers: 84 Carroll Dale; 47 Dave Davis; 85 John Spilis; Tight ends: 88 Len Garrett; 81 Rich McGeorge	Offensive linemen: 57 Ken Bowman C; 61 Dave Bradley G; 68 Gale Gillingham G; 77 Bill Hayhoe T; 72 Dick Himes T; 62 Bill Lueck G; 71 Francis Peay T; 54 Wimpy Winther C; 58 Cal Withrow C; Defensive linemen: 82 Lionel Aldridge DE; 78 Bob Brown DE; 79 Jim DeLisle DT; 76 Mike McCoy DT; 87 Alden Roche DE/DT; 83 Clarence Williams DE	Linebackers: 53 Fred Carr OLB; 50 Jim Carter MLB; 56 Tommy Joe Crutcher OLB; 66 Ray Nitschke MLB; 89 Dave Robinson OLB; Defensive backs: 48 Ken Ellis CB; 21 Charlie Hall CB; 43 Doug Hart SS; 29 Al Matthews CB; 27 Al Randolph SS; 24 Willie Wood FS; Special teams: 38 Tim Webster K	Reserve lists: 18 Ken Duncan P (IR); 64 Kevin Hunt T (IR); -- Barry Mayer RB (IR); Taxi squad: 36 Mike Carter WR; 75 Lou Michaels K; 10 Frank Patrick QB; 22 Elijah Pitts RB; 74 Donnell Smith DE; 63 Randy Winkler G

== Preseason ==
Week	Date	Opponent	Result	Record	Venue	Attendance
1	August 7	Chicago Bears	L 0–2	0–1	Milwaukee County Stadium	47,248
2	August 14	Pittsburgh Steelers	L 13–16	0–2	Lambeau Field	56,263
3	August 21	Miami Dolphins	W 10–7	1–2	Milwaukee County Stadium	46,464
4	August 28	Oakland Raiders	L 13–17	1–3	Lambeau Field	56,263
5	September 4	at Cincinnati Bengals	L 24–27	1–4	Riverfront Stadium	55,477
6	September 10	at Buffalo Bills	W 20–14	2–4	War Memorial Stadium	37,301

== Schedule ==
Week	Date	Opponent	Result	Record	Venue	Attendance	Recap
1	September 19	New York Giants	**L** 40–42	0–1	Lambeau Field	56,263	Recap
2	September 26	Denver Broncos	**W** 34–13	1–1	Milwaukee County Stadium	47,957	Recap
3	October 3	Cincinnati Bengals	**W** 20–17	2–1	Lambeau Field	56,263	Recap
4	October 10	at **Detroit Lions**	**L** 28–31	2–2	Tiger Stadium	54,418	Recap
5	October 17	**Minnesota Vikings**	**L** 13–24	2–3	Lambeau Field	56,263	Recap
6	October 24	at Los Angeles Rams	**L** 13–30	2–4	Los Angeles Memorial Coliseum	75,531	Recap
7	November 1	**Detroit Lions**	**T** 14–14	2–4–1	Milwaukee County Stadium	47,961	Recap
8	November 7	at **Chicago Bears**	**W** 17–14	3–4–1	Soldier Field	55,049	Recap
9	November 14	at **Minnesota Vikings**	**L** 0–3	3–5–1	Metropolitan Stadium	49,784	Recap
10	November 22	at Atlanta Falcons	**L** 21–28	3–6–1	Atlanta Stadium	58,850	Recap
11	November 28	New Orleans Saints	**L** 21–29	3–7–1	Milwaukee County Stadium	48,035	Recap
12	December 5	at St. Louis Cardinals	**T** 16–16	3–7–2	Busch Stadium	50,443	Recap
13	December 12	**Chicago Bears**	**W** 31–10	4–7–2	Lambeau Field	56,263	Recap
14	December 19	at Miami Dolphins	**L** 6–27	4–8–2	Orange Bowl	76,812	Recap

Monday (November 1, 22)

Note: Intra-division opponents are in bold text.

== Game summaries ==
=== Week 8 ===
Week Eight: Green Bay Packers (2–4–1) at Chicago Bears (5–2)

Quarter	1	2	3	4	Total
Packers	0	14	0	3	17
Bears	0	0	0	14	14

at Soldier Field • Chicago, Illinois

- Date: November 7
- Game time: 2:00 p.m.
- Game weather: 27 °F (−3 °C) • Wind 16 miles per hour (26 km/h; 14 kn)
- Game attendance: 55,049
- Referee: Bob Frederic
- Pro-Football-Reference.com

Game information

Packers

- Scott Hunter
  7/14, 133 Yds, TD, INT
- John Brockington
  30 Rush, 142 Yds, TD
- Donny Anderson
  3 Rec, 50 Yds

Bears

- Bobby Douglass
  18/37, 192 Yds, TD, 3 INT
  5 Rush, 30 Yds, TD
- Bob Wallace
  4 Rec, 48 Yds

Scoring summary

Quarter	Time	Drive			Team	Scoring information	Score	
Quarter	Time	Plays	Yards	TOP	Team	Scoring information	GB	CHI
2					Packers	Carroll Dale 31-yard touchdown reception from Scott Hunter, Lou Michaels kick good	7	0
2					Packers	John Brockington 7-yard touchdown run, Lou Michaels kick good	14	0
4					Bears	George Farmer 30-yard touchdown reception from Bobby Douglass, Mac Percival kick good	14	7
4					Bears	Bobby Douglass 1-yard touchdown run, Mac Percival kick good	14	14
4					Packers	22-yard field goal by Lou Michaels	17	14
"TOP" = time of possession. For other American football terms, see Glossary of American football.							17	14

=== Week 13 ===
Chicago Bears (6–6) at Green Bay Packers (3–7–2)

Quarter	1	2	3	4	Total
Bears	7	0	3	0	10
Packers	7	0	14	10	31

at Lambeau Field • Green Bay, Wisconsin

- Date: December 12
- Game time: 2:00 p.m.
- Game weather: 28 °F (−2 °C) • Wind 12 miles per hour (19 km/h; 10 kn)
- Game attendance: 56,263
- Pro-Football-Reference.com

Game information

Bears

- Kent Nix
  7/18, 149 Yds, TD, INT
- Joe Moore
  9 Rush, 20 Yds
- Dick Gordon
  3 Rec, 80 Yds

Packers

- Scott Hunter
  6/12, 169 Yds, TD, INT
- John Brockington
  20 Rush, 63 Yds, TD
- Carroll Dale
  1 Rec, 77 Yds, TD

Ray Nitschke Day

Scoring summary

Quarter	Time	Drive			Team	Scoring information	Score	
Quarter	Time	Plays	Yards	TOP	Team	Scoring information	CHI	GB
1					Packers	Carroll Dale 77-yard touchdown reception from Scott Hunter, Tim Webster kick good	0	7
1					Bears	George Farmer 31-yard touchdown reception from Kent Nix, Mac Percival kick good	7	7
3					Packers	John Brockington 6-yard touchdown run, Tim Webster kick good	7	14
3					Packers	Scott Hunter 1-yard touchdown run, Tim Webster kick good	7	21
3					Bears	12-yard field goal by Mac Percival	10	21
4					Packers	Bart Starr 1-yard touchdown run, Tim Webster kick good	10	28
4					Packers	27-yard field goal by Tim Webster	10	31
"TOP" = time of possession. For other American football terms, see Glossary of American football.							10	31

== Standings ==
NFC Central
	W	L	T	PCT	DIV	CONF	PF	PA	STK
Minnesota Vikings	11	3	0	.786	5–1	9–2	245	139	W2
Detroit Lions	7	6	1	.538	2–3–1	3–6–1	341	286	L2
Chicago Bears	6	8	0	.429	2–4	5–6	185	276	L5
Green Bay Packers	4	8	2	.333	2–3–1	2–7–2	274	298	L1

Note: Tie games were not officially counted in the standings until 1972.
