= List of El Camino College alumni =

El Camino College is a public community college in Los Angeles County, California, United States. Most of it is in Alondra Park, while a section is in the city limits of Torrance. Following is a list of some of El Camino College's notable alumni.

== Academics and education ==
- Gerard Robinson, education reformer
- Nathan Salmon, professor (graduated under the name Nathan Salmon Ucuzoglu)

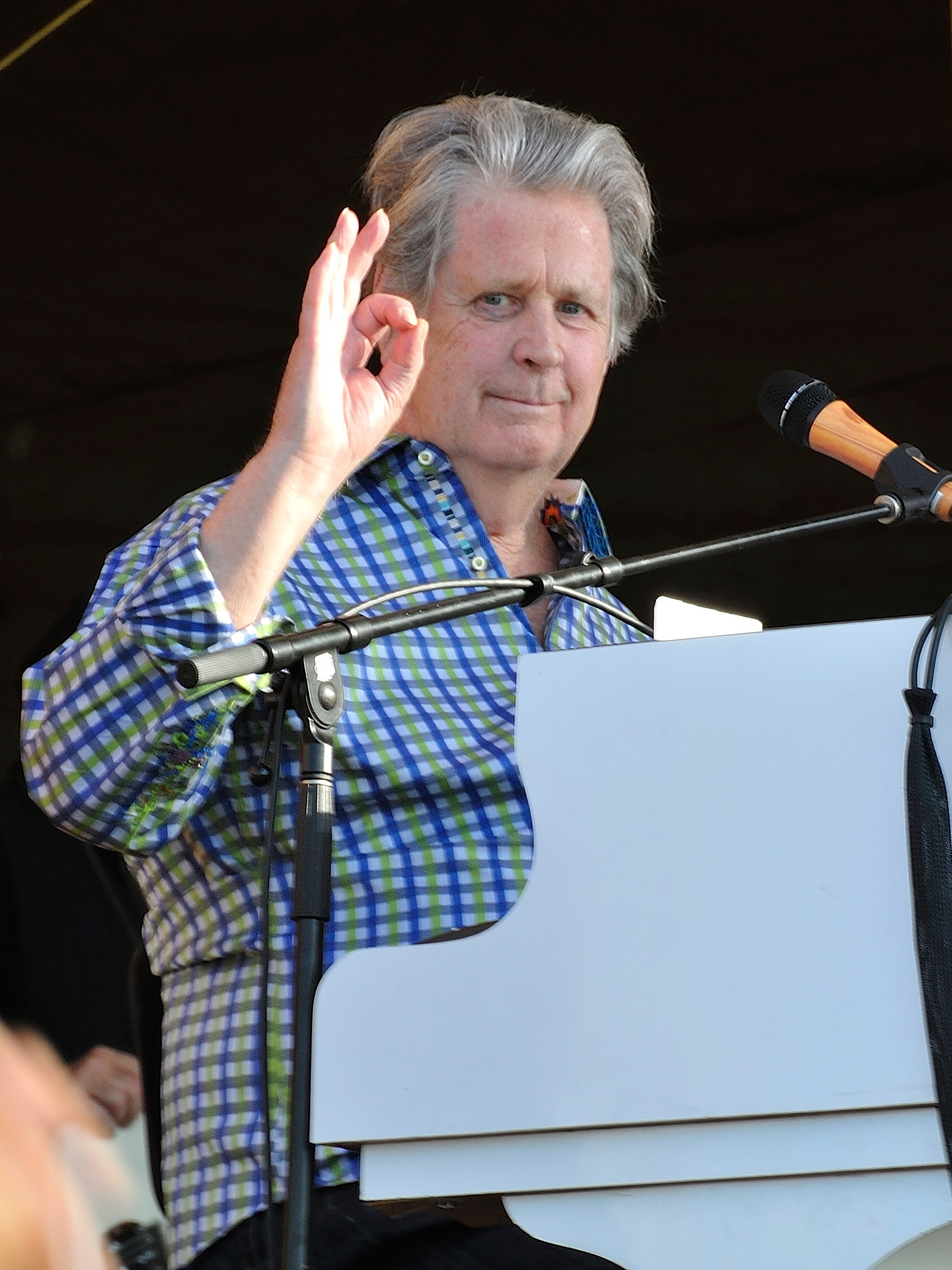
Brian Wilson, musician

== Entertainment ==
- Chet Baker, musician (did not graduate)
- David Benoit, musician
- Lewis John Carlino, screenwriter, playwright, and director
- Bo Derek, actress
- Fred Dryer, actor, producer, and professional football player
- Jason Farol, singer
- Alan Jardine, The Beach Boys co-founder
- Suge Knight, CEO and founder of Death Row Records
- Frederico Lapenda, movie producer, MMA promoter
- Clara Lee, actress
- Chris Montez, singer (did not graduate)
- Carol Neblett, operatic soprano
- David Pack, singer and musician
- Park Jun-gyu, actor
- Ras Kass, rapper (did not graduate)
- Lauren Sánchez, Emmy Award-nominated American news anchor
- Douglas Trumbull, filmmaker
- Brian Wilson, The Beach Boys co-founder (did not graduate)
- Jacob Wysocki, actor and comedian
- William Allen Young, actor

== Politics ==
- Robert Cornegy, New York City councilmember
- Rudy de Leon, US Deputy Secretary of Defense
- Dennis Mangers, California assemblyman
- Therese Murray, president of the Massachusetts Senate
- George Nakano, California assemblyman

== Science ==
- Michael Fincke, NASA astronaut

== Sports ==
- Mary Akor, long-distance runner
- Antonio Chatman, professional football player
- Fred Claire, general manager of the Los Angeles Dodgers
- Derrick Deese, professional football player and Fox Sports Radio host
- Don Dulay, professional basketball player
- Keith Erickson, professional basketball player
- George Foster, professional baseball player
- Donte Gamble, professional football player
- Denny Hocking, professional baseball player
- Flo Hyman, Olympic volleyball player
- Saladin McCullough, professional football player
- Kris Medlen, professional baseball player (attended but finished at Santa Ana College)
- Cliff Meidl, Olympic kayaker
- Chris Mortensen, sports journalist
- Jamize Olawale, professional football player
- John Ramsey, public address announcer for several L.A. professional sports teams
- Marcel Reece, professional football player
- Tamir Saban, professional basketball player
- Niu Sale, professional football player
- Steve Sarkisian, professional football player and coach (attended but finished at BYU)
- Ken Swearingen, college football player and coach
- Kenbrell Thompkins, professional football player
- Verran Tucker, professional football player

== Other ==
- Lynette Fromme, member of the Manson family (did not graduate)
