= Jim Kanicki =

American football player (1941–2026)

No. 69, 73
- Position: Defensive tackle

Personal information
- Born: December 17, 1941; Bay City, Michigan, U.S.
- Died: April 14, 2026 (aged 84); Pierpont, Ohio, U.S.
- Listed height: 6 ft 4 in (1.93 m)
- Listed weight: 270 lb (122 kg)

Career information
- High school: Central (Bay City)
- College: Michigan State
- NFL draft: 1963: 2nd round, 23rd overall pick
- AFL draft: 1963: 7th round, 52nd overall pick

Career history
- Cleveland Browns (1963–1969); New York Giants (1970–1971)

Awards and highlights
- NFL champion (1964)

Career NFL statistics
- Fumble recoveries: 6
- Sacks: 31
- Stats at Pro Football Reference

James Henry Kanicki (December 17, 1941 – April 14, 2026) was an American professional football player who was a defensive tackle in the National Football League (NFL) for the Cleveland Browns and New York Giants. He played college football for the Michigan State Spartans and was selected in the second round of the 1963 NFL draft. Kanicki was also selected in the seventh round of the 1963 AFL draft by the Buffalo Bills.

== Early life ==
Kanicki was born in Bay City, Michigan, on December 17, 1941. He attended Bay City Central High School where he was an All-State football player, excelling on both the offensive and defensive lines. Kanicki was twice named a Class A All-State center (1957-58).

He also played basketball and threw the shot put in high school. In 1975, he was inducted in the Bay City Central High School Alumni Hall of Fame; and in 1993, he was inducted in the Bay County Sports Hall of Fame.

== College football ==
Kanicki attended Michigan State University, where he was a star football player. He played center and defensive tackle on the football team (1960-62), wearing No. 69. He played under head coach Duffy Daugherty. One of Kanicki's offensive linemates during his college career was All-American and future NFL All Pro Ed Budde (1960-62).

He was selected to play in the Blue-Gray Game in December 1962, and the Senior Bowl in January of 1963. Kanicki was the star of the Blue-Gray Game, recovering two fumbles, blocking a punt, while also kicking a 40-yard field goal and an extra point. He also played in the 1963 Chicago College All-Star game, when the college players defeated the Packers in what Vince Lombardi called his most embarrassing loss as a coach.

== Professional football ==
The Cleveland Browns selected Kanicki in the second round of the 1963 NFL draft, 23rd overall. The Buffalo Bills selected Kanicki in the 7th round of the 1963 AFL draft, 52nd overall. He chose to play for Cleveland, though he had initially signed with the Bills. The Bills contract was declared invalid since Kanicki was not 21 when he signed it. As a rookie in 1963, Kanicki played in 13 games, but started in only one game, as a backup to Pro Bowl tackle Bob Gain and Frank Parker.

Kanicki started nine games in 1964 at right defensive tackle, replacing Parker. He improved under the tutelage of fellow defensive tackle Dick Modzelewski, a 12-year veteran who had come to Cleveland that year from the New York Giants, and replaced Gain at left tackle (after Gain broke his leg). Kanicki had looked terrible in his early games, but improved significantly under Modzelewski's guidance throughout the year.

He played an important part in the Browns 1964 NFL championship victory over the Baltimore Colts. He would be facing Colts future hall of fame offensive guard Jim Parker, and it was anticipated that this matchup would strongly favor the Colts. Instead, Kanicki and Modzelewski provided a strong inside rush against the Colts, that forced Colts Hall of Fame quarterback Johnny Unitas into hurrying his passes. Colts Hall of Fame coach Don Shula said that the Browns entire defensive line of Kanicki, Modzelewski, Bill Glass and Paul Wiggin, dominated the Colts that day. Kanicki had .5 quarterback sacks in the game, and Glass 1.5.

In 1965, Kanicki started all 14 games, and had three quarterback sacks. The Browns played for the 1965 NFL championship, losing to the Green Bay Packers; again with a defensive line of Kanicki, Modzelewski, Glass and Wiggin. From 1966-68, Kanicki started 34 games, next to Modzelewski's successor Walter Johnson (who was named to the Pro Bowl, 1967-68). Kanicki had 17.5 sacks over those three years, with his career high 7.5 coming in 1968. In 1968, the Browns lost the 1968 NFL championship game to the Colts.

Kanicki played in an era when the head slap was legal, and because of his power, he used it to great effect in stunning opposing linemen.

He suffered a broken leg during an exhibition game in 1969, but came back to start the last five games, and made it back for the Browns two playoff games that year. The Browns defeated the Dallas Cowboys in the divisional round, where Kanicki had a sack, but lost the 1969 NFL championship game to the Minnesota Vikings.

In six years as a starter, Kanicki had gone to the NFL championship game four times. In 1970, however, the Browns, to Kanicki's surprise and shock, traded him along with running back Ron Johnson and linebacker Wayne Meylan to the New York Giants for wide receiver Homer Jones. He did not want to leave Cleveland, and the trade was the low point of his career. The trade was done in tandem with the Browns trading future Hall of Fame receiver Paul Warfield (whom Jones was to replace) to the Miami Dolphins for the third overall draft pick in the 1970 draft, which they intended to use to draft quarterback Mike Phipps; now considered one of the worst trades in Browns' history.

Kanicki had 4.5 sacks for the Giants in 1970, and the Giants pass rush improved with his presence. The team went from a 6–8 won–loss record in 1969, to a 9–5 record in 1970. Running back Johnson led the NFL in total yards from scrimmage in 1970, and became a first-team All Pro that year. Jones suffered knee injuries that limited him to only four starts with the Browns in 1970, and he retired at the end of the year.

1971 was Kanicki's final year in the NFL, at age 30. He started 9 of 14 games and had two sacks for the Giants. He was in and out of the lineup because of badly bruised ribs. The Giants finished the year with a 4–10 record. He suffered an Achilles tendon injury in early 1972 when he slipped and fell on ice near his Ohio home. He retired from the NFL and did not play in 1972.

In 1974, he ended his career with the Houston Texans and Shreveport Steamer of the World Football League.

== Legacy ==
In 2012, the Cleveland Plain Dealer named Kanicki one of the Cleveland Browns' 100 best all-time players.

Kanicki was fluent in Polish. During a game against the Green Bay Packers, quarterback Zeke Bratkowski gave instructions in Polish to teammate Bob Skoronski when they lined up for the play. Understanding what they said, Kanicki remarked in Polish, "'That's a smart call.'" Bratkowski then told the team to scratch the play, in English.

== Personal life and death ==
Kanicki purchased the Arthur Louis Steel Company of Ashtabula, Ohio, in 1985 and maintained control of the business. He died in Pierpont, Ohio on April 14, 2026, at the age of 84.
