= Paige Cothren =

American football player (1935–2016)

No. 36, 45
- Position: Placekicker

Personal information
- Born: July 12, 1935; Natchez, Mississippi, U.S.
- Died: September 1, 2016 (aged 81); Tupelo, Mississippi, U.S.
- Listed height: 5 ft 11 in (1.80 m)
- Listed weight: 201 lb (91 kg)

Career information
- High school: Natchez
- College: Ole Miss (1953–1956)
- NFL draft: 1957: 22nd round, 256th overall pick

Career history
- Los Angeles Rams (1957–1958); Philadelphia Eagles (1959)

Awards and highlights
- 2× Second-team All-American (1955, 1956); 2× First-team All-SEC (1955, 1956)

Career NFL statistics
- Field goals made: 33
- Field goal attempts: 62
- Field goal %: 53.2
- Stats at Pro Football Reference

Jennings Paige Cothren (July 12, 1935 – September 1, 2016) was an American professional football fullback-placekicker who played collegiately at the University of Mississippi before he became the first player to sign a contract with the New Orleans Saints in the National Football League (NFL), although he would never play a game for the team. Known by his middle name, Cothren spent time with two NFL teams, the Los Angeles Rams (1957–58) and Philadelphia Eagles (1959). In his career, he booted 81 consecutive extra points without a miss to join a select group to achieve the feat.

Cothren was inducted into the Ole Miss Athletics of Fame in 1988.

== High School, College Careers ==
Before Cothren became a full-time placekicker in the pro ranks, he was a versatile fullback and linebacker in high school and college. In its 1957 bowl games preview, Sports Illustrated described him as "Big enough at 195 (pounds) and with the speed needed to be a very fine off-tackle power runner or to sprint around end. Devastating blocker, kicks points and field goals."

As a senior at Natchez High School in his hometown of Natchez, Mississippi, Cothren was an All-America selection on the strength of 10 touchdowns and 21 point-after-touchdown conversions. He stayed in state to attend Ole Miss and was a core player for the 1955 Rebels team that achieved one of the greatest seasons in school history. The repeat Southeastern Conference champions won their final nine games en route to a 10-1 record, which included a 14-13 thriller over Texas Christian in the Cotton Bowl in Dallas. Not only did the junior rush for a team-high 79 yards on 12 carries and score a 3-yard touchdown, but he helped author one of the most famous plays in school history.

The Rebels trailed 13-7 late in the fourth quarter when Cothren broke a tackle on a crucial 13-yard reception on fourth down to keep the drive alive. After a touchdown moments later, he capped the rally with the game-winning extra point. He earned second-time All-America honors and was chosen to play in the Hula Bowl that season.

== Professional career ==
The Eagles picked Cothren in the 22nd round of the 1957 NFL draft, but opportunities were scarce with the veteran-laden team and he was released before the start of the season. The Rams signed him as a free agent, which proved to be one of their better personnel moves. As a rookie, Cothren led the league in extra points (38) and attempts (38). One season later, he was the league leader in field goals (14) and field goal percentage (.560).

Despite their success, Cothren and the second-place Rams parted ways after the 1958 campaign, when team management decided to use defensive end Lou Michaels as their placekicker rather than pay a specialist to fill the role. Cothren returned to the Eagles midway through the season, and in Week 11, he kicked a 14-yard field goal in the fourth quarter to beat his former Rams team by a 23-20 score in Philadelphia.

In 1966, shortly after the Saints were granted an NFL franchise, head coach Tom Fears invited Cothren to their first training camp. Even though the 31-year-old had been out of football for seven seasons, he fared well in the tryout, but the team opted for the younger Charlie Durkee instead.

== Post-career ==
Cothren died after a brief illness on September 1, 2016 in Tupelo, Mississippi at 81 years of age.
