= 1955 All-America college football team =

Official list of the best college football players of 1955

The 1955 All-America college football team is composed of college football players who were selected as All-Americans by various organizations and writers that chose All-America college football teams in 1955. The eight selectors recognized by the NCAA as "official" for the 1955 season are (1) the All-America Board (AAB), (2) the American Football Coaches Association (AFCA), (3) the Associated Press, (4) the Football Writers Association of America (FWAA), (5) the International News Service (INS), (6) the Newspaper Enterprise Association (NEA), (7) the Sporting News (SN), and (8) the United Press (UP).

== Consensus All-Americans ==
For the year 1955, the NCAA recognizes eight published All-American teams as "official" designations for purposes of its consensus determinations. The following chart identifies the NCAA-recognized consensus All-Americans and displays which first-team designations they received.

Name	Position	School	Number	Official	Other
Howard Cassady	Halfback	Ohio State	8/8	AAB, AFCA, AP, FWAA, INS, NEA, SN, UP	CP, Jet, NBC, WC
Ron Beagle	End	Navy	8/8	AAB, AFCA, AP, FWAA, INS, NEA, SN, UP	CP, NBC, WC
Jim Swink	Halfback	TCU	8/8	AAB, AFCA, AP, FWAA, INS, NEA, SN, UP	CP, NBC, WC
Bob Pellegrini	Center	Maryland	8/8	AAB, AFCA, AP, FWAA, INS, NEA, SN, UP	CP, Jet, NBC, WC
Bo Bolinger	Guard	Oklahoma	7/8	AAB, AFCA, FWAA, INS, NEA, SN, UP	CP, Jet, NBC, WC
Ron Kramer	End	Michigan	7/8	AAB, AFCA, FWAA, INS, NEA, SN, UP	Jet, WC
Bruce Bosley	Tackle	West Virginia	5/8	AAB, AFCA, INS, SN, UP	WC
Earl Morrall	Quarterback	Michigan State	5/8	AP, AFCA, FWAA, INS, SN	Jet, NBC, WC
Paul Hornung	Halfback	Notre Dame	5/8	AAB, FWAA, NEA, SN, UP	WC
Cal Jones	Guard	Iowa	4/8	AAB, FWAA, SN, UP	Jet, WC
Hardiman Cureton	Guard	UCLA	4/8	AAB, AFCA, FWAA, INS	CP
Norm Masters	Tackle	Michigan State	3/8	UP, FWAA, NEA	CP, NBC, WC

== All-American selections for 1955 ==
=== Ends ===
- Ron Beagle, Navy (AAB, AFCA, AP-1, FWAA, INS-1, NEA-1, SN, UP-1, CP-1, Jet-2, NBC, WC)
- Ron Kramer, Michigan (AAB, AFCA, FWAA, INS-1, NEA-1, SN, UP-1, CP-2, Jet-1, WC)
- Howard Schnellenberger, Kentucky (AP-1, NEA-2)
- Joe Walton, Pittsburgh (INS-2, CP-1)
- Rommie Loudd, UCLA (FWAA, CP-2, Jet-1, NBC)
- Harold Burnine, Missouri (FWAA, INS-2, NEA-2, UP-3, CP-3)
- Tom Maentz, Michigan (AP-2, UP-2, CP-3)
- John Paluck, Pittsburgh (AP-2, UP-3)
- Bill Walker, Maryland (UP-2)
- Joe Tuminello, LSU (AP-3, NEA-3)
- Jim Katcavage, Dayton (INS-2)
- Dave Howard, Wisconsin (NEA-3)
- Henry Gremminger, Baylor (AP-3)
- Menan Schriewer, Texas (Jet-2)

=== Tackles ===
- Norm Masters, Michigan State (AP-3, UP-1, FWAA, NEA-1, CP-1, Jet-2, NBC, WC)
- Bruce Bosley, West Virginia (AAB, AP-2, AFCA, INS-1, SN, UP-1, CP-2, WC)
- Sam Huff, West Virginia (FWAA, NEA-1, UP-3, Jet-1, NBC)
- John Witte, Oregon State (INS-1, AP-3, NEA-3, CP-3, Jet-1)
- Frank D'Agostino, Auburn (AP-1, AFCA, UP-3)
- Mike Sandusky, Maryland (SN, UP-2, NEA-2)
- Paul Wiggin, Stanford (AP-1)
- Herb Gray, Texas (FWAA)
- Phil Tarasovic, Yale (INS-2, NEA-3, CP-3)
- Francis Machinsky, Ohio State (UP-2)
- Carl Vereen, Georgia Tech (NEA-2)
- Roger Siesel, Miami (Ohio) (INS-2)
- Fred Robinson, Washington (CP-2)
- John Jankins, Arizona State (Jet-2)

=== Guards ===
- Bo Bolinger, Oklahoma (AAB, AP-2, AFCA, FWAA, INS-1, NEA-1, SN, UP-1, CP-1, Jet-1, NBC, WC)
- Cal Jones, Iowa (Outland Trophy and College Football Hall of Fame) (AAB, AP-2 [tackle], FWAA, SN, UP-1, NEA-2; INS-2; CP-2, Jet-1, WC)
- Hardiman Cureton, UCLA (AAB [tackle], AFCA, FWAA [t], INS-1, UP-2, NEA-2, CP-1 [t], Jet-2)
- Jim Parker, Ohio State (AP-3, FWAA, NEA-3, UP-2, CP-1, Jet-1)
- Tony Sardisco, Tulane (FWAA, INS-2)
- Pat Bisceglia, Notre Dame (AP-1, UP-3, NBC)
- Scott Suber, Mississippi State (AP-2, NEA-1)
- James D. Brown, UCLA (AP-1)
- Orlando Ferrante, USC (INS-2, CP-3)
- Buck Nystrom, Michigan State (INS-2, CP-3)
- Jim Buonopane, Holy Cross (CP-2)
- William Meigs, Harvard (AP-3)
- Franklin Brooks, Georgia Tech (UP-3)
- Bryan Burnthorne, Tulane (NEA-3)

=== Centers ===
- Bob Pellegrini, Maryland (AAB, AFCA, AP-1, FWAA, INS-1, NEA-1, SN, UP-1, CP-1, Jet-1, NBC, WC)
- Hugh Pitts, Texas Christian (AP-2, FWAA, INS-2, NEA-2, UP-2, CP-3)
- Jerry Tubbs, Oklahoma (College Football Hall of Fame) (INS-2, NEA-3, UP-3)
- Ken Vargo, Ohio State (CP-2, Jet-2)
- Steve DeLatorre, Florida (AP-3)

=== Quarterbacks ===
- Earl Morrall, Michigan State (AP-1, AFCA, FWAA, INS-1, NEA-2, SN, UP-2, CP-3, Jet-1, NBC, WC)
- George Welsh, Navy (AP-3, INS-2, NEA-3, UP-2, CP-1)
- Claude Benham, Columbia (Jet-2)

=== Halfbacks ===
- Howard Cassady, Ohio State (AAB, AFCA, AP-1, FWAA, INS-1, NEA-1, SN, UP-1, CP-1, Jet-1, NBC, WC)
- Paul Hornung, Notre Dame (AAB, FWAA, NEA-1 [QB], SN, UP-1, WC)
- Jim Swink, TCU (AAB, AFCA, AP-1, FWAA, INS-1, NEA-1, SN, UP-1, CP-1, Jet-2, NBC, WC)
- Jon Arnett, Southern California (AP-2, FWAA, INS-2, NEA-1, UP-1, CP-2)
- Tommy McDonald, Oklahoma (AP-1, INS-2, NEA-2, UP-2, CP-2)
- Art Davis, Mississippi State (FWAA, NEA-2)
- Ed Vereb, Maryland (AP-3, INS-2, UP-3, CP-3)
- Jim Brown, Syracuse (AP-3, INS-2, NEA-3)
- Gary Glick, Colorado A&M (AP-2, INS-2)
- Sam Brown, UCLA (INS-2, UP-3, Jet-1)
- Charley Horton, Vanderbilt (AP-3, NEA-3)
- Fob James, Auburn (INS-2)
- Lenny Moore, Penn State (Pro Football Hall of Fame) (INS-2, Jet-2)
- Charley Sticka, Trinity (INS-2)
- Paige Cothren, Mississippi (INS-2)
- Robert A. Pascal, Duke (CP-3)

=== Fullbacks ===
- Don Schaefer, Notre Dame (AFCA, AP-2, FWAA, INS-1, NEA-3, UP-3, CP-1, Jet-2, NBC)
- Joe Childress, Auburn (FWAA, NEA-2, UP-3, CP-3)
- Bob Davenport, UCLA (AAB, AP-2, UP-2, CP-2)
- Jerry Planutis, Michigan State (Jet-1)

== Key ==
- **Bold** – Consensus All-American
- -1 – First-team selection
- -2 – Second-team selection
- -3 – Third-team selection

=== Official selectors ===
- AAB = All-America Board
- AFCA = American Football Coaches Association, for Collier's Weekly magazine
- AP = Associated Press
- FWAA = Football Writers Association of America
- INS = International News Service: selected based on "recommendations of INS football experts from coast-to-coast with the assistance of coaches, scouts, broadcasters and newspaper sports editors."
- NEA = Newspaper Enterprise Association: All-Americans selected by the NEA received "solid gold Longines-Wittnauer watches, handsome and specially designed certificates and, perhaps best of all, testimonial dinners in their old home towns."
- SN = Sporting News
- UP = United Press

=== Other selectors ===
- CP = Central Press Association
- Jet - Jet magazine
- NBC - National Broadcasting Co.
- WC - Walter Camp Football Foundation

== See also ==
- 1955 All-Atlantic Coast Conference football team
- 1955 All-Big Seven Conference football team
- 1955 All-Big Ten Conference football team
- 1955 All-Pacific Coast Conference football team
- 1955 All-SEC football team
- 1955 All-Skyline Conference football team
- 1955 All-Southwest Conference football team
