= Paul Wiggin =

American football player and coach (1934–2025)

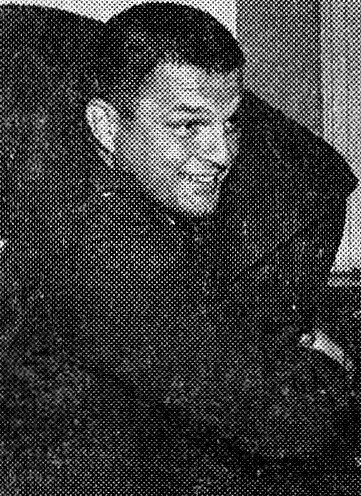
- Wiggin, circa 1962

No. 86, 84
- Position: Defensive end

Personal information
- Born: November 18, 1934; Modesto, California, U.S.
- Died: December 12, 2025 (aged 91)
- Listed height: 6 ft 3 in (1.91 m)
- Listed weight: 242 lb (110 kg)

Career information
- High school: Manteca (Manteca, California)
- College: Modesto (1953); Stanford (1954–1956)
- NFL draft: 1956: 6th round, 73rd overall pick

Career history

Playing
- Cleveland Browns (1957–1967)

Coaching
- San Francisco 49ers (1968–1974); Defensive line coach (1968–1973); Defensive coordinator (1974); Kansas City Chiefs (1975–1977) Head coach; New Orleans Saints (1978–1979) Defensive coordinator; Stanford (1980–1983) Head coach; Minnesota Vikings (1985–1991) Defensive line coach

Operations
- Minnesota Vikings (1992–2015) Senior consultant for pro personnel

Awards and highlights
- NFL champion (1964); 2× Pro Bowl (1965, 1967); Cleveland Browns Legends; 2× First-team All-American (1955, 1956); 2× First-team All-PCC (1955, 1956)

Career NFL statistics
- Fumble recoveries: 19
- Total touchdowns: 2
- Sacks: 60.5
- Stats at Pro Football Reference

Head coaching record
- Regular season: NFL: 11–24 (.314); NCAA: 16–28 (.364)
- Coaching profile at Pro Football Reference
- College Football Hall of Fame

Paul David Wiggin (November 18, 1934 – December 12, 2025) was an American football player, coach, scout, and executive. He played professionally as a defensive end with the Cleveland Browns of the National Football League (NFL) for 11 seasons. He was twice selected to play in the Pro Bowl, and was the starting left defensive end on the Browns 1964 NFL championship team. He led the NFL in fumble recoveries (four) during his final season.

After retiring as an NFL player, for over 50 years, Wiggin coached in the NFL as well as in college football; and was an NFL scout and executive; including 40 years with the Minnesota Vikings. He was a head coach with the Kansas City Chiefs and Stanford Cardinal, a defensive line coach and defensive coordinator with the San Francisco 49ers, and a defensive coordinator with the New Orleans Saints. He joined the Vikings as a defensive line coach in 1985. The Vikings led the NFL in fewest yards allowed in 1988 and 1989. The Vikings' 1989 defense had 71 quarterback sacks in a 16-game season, second most in NFL history.

== Early life ==
Wiggin was born on November 18, 1934, in Modesto, California, and attended Manteca High School in Manteca, California, where he competed in four sports. When he graduated Manteca High School in 1952, he was named the Most Outstanding Athlete.

Wiggin played tackle in football, was on the school's championship football team, and was selected to the All-Central California team in 1951. He received honorable mention twice for the All-Northern-California team, and was selected as an All-Star to play in the California high school North-South Shrine game in 1952. Wiggin also established a shot put record competing in track.

He attended Modesto Junior College, where he was a standout in football and track. Wiggin played both offense and defense on the football team. He is a member of the Modesto Junior College Athletics Hall of Fame. The Modesto Bee selected him at offensive tackle to its All-Big Seven Conference team in 1952.

== College football ==
Wiggin went on from Modesto Junior College to Stanford University, where he graduated in 1957. He later earned a master's degree from Stanford in 1959. At 6 ft 3 in (1.91 m) and 228 pounds (103.4 kg), he played defensive tackle on Stanford's football team from 1954 to 1956. Although selected in the 1956 NFL draft, Wiggin stayed at Stanford for another season in 1956, and was the anchor of Stanford's defensive line. His Stanford teammates included, among others, future NFL quarterback John Brodie.

Wiggin was a two-time, first-team All-American and All-Pacific Coast Conference (1955, 1956). The Associated Press (AP) named him a first-team All American in 1955 and second-team All-American in 1956. He was selected to The Sporting News' 11-player All-America team in 1956. United Press named him a second-team All-American in 1956. His future Cleveland Browns teammates Bill Glass and Jim Brown were first team AP All-Americans in 1956. Wiggin played in the 1956 East-West Shrine Game and the 1957 Hula Bowl. Fans voted him Stanford's defensive player of the century. In 2005, he was inducted into the College Football Hall of Fame.

== Professional football ==
The Cleveland Browns selected Wiggin in the sixth round of the 1956 NFL draft, 73rd overall; held in January 1956. Wiggins was a "red shirt" draft choice. He played one more year at Stanford, before joining the Browns as a rookie in 1957. Wiggin started two games as a rookie in 1957, under future Hall of Fame coach Paul Brown, playing well in a reserve defensive end roll. The Browns finished first in the NFL's East Division, but lost the 1957 NFL Championship Game to the Detroit Lions.

Brown originally planned to use Wiggin as his starting left defensive end in 1958, after having traded 1957 starter Len Ford. Wiggin started six games in 1958 at left defensive end, splitting time with future Hall of Fame defensive end, rookie Willie Davis who had played very well in training camp and then during the season.

Wiggin started all 12 games in 1959, playing right defensive end. In 1960, Brown moved Wiggin to left defensive end, where he started 11 games, with a career-high nine quarterback sacks. In the fourth quarter of the 1960 season's final game against the New York Giants, Wiggin intercepted a lateral pass thrown by Charlie Conerly and returned it 20 yards for a touchdown to tie the game; which the Browns went on to win 48–34.

The NFL expanded its schedule from 12 to 14 games per year in 1961. Wiggin started 14 games at right defensive end that season, with eight sacks and two fumble recoveries. In May 1962, the Browns obtained Bill Glass from the Detroit Lions. Glass became the Browns' right defensive end in 1962, with Wiggin moving to left defensive end; both players starting all 14 games that season. Glass had 15½ sacks and Wiggin six sacks, with one fumble recovery. The team had a 7–6–1 record in 1962; finishing third in the NFL East Division.

Glass was the Browns' right defensive end from 1962 to 1969. Wiggin and Glass started every game on the Browns' defensive line at left and right defensive end from 1962 through 1967 (the final season of Wiggin's playing career). In 1963, Cleveland Brown Legend linebacker Vince Costello believed Glass and Wiggin were the best pair of defensive ends in the NFL going into the 1963 season. In 1963, Wiggin had seven sacks, two fumble recoveries, and an interception; with Glass having 9½ sacks. The Browns had a 10–4 record, finishing second in the East Division. Wiggin was the team's defensive player of the year in 1963.

The 1964 Browns were 10–3–1, and finished first in the NFL's East Division. Wiggin was a key member of the Brown's defensive line, consisting of Wiggin, Glass, Dick Modzelewski at left tackle, and Jim Kanicki at right tackle. During the 1964 regular season, Wiggin had 8½ quarterback sacks, and three fumble recoveries, one of which he returned for a touchdown in a late October game against the New York Giants. The Browns won the 1964 NFL Championship Game with a 27–0 shutout of the Baltimore Colts. Wiggin recovered a Lenny Moore fumble in the championship game.

In 1965, Wiggin had 7½ sacks and was selected to play in the Pro Bowl. The Browns lost in the 1965 NFL Championship Game to the Green Bay Packers. In 1966, Wiggin had four fumble recoveries and six sacks. He was the Brown's player of the year in 1966. In his final season (1967), Wiggin had 8½ sacks, led the NFL with four fumble recoveries, and was named to the Pro Bowl for a second time. He resigned as a Browns' player in mid-February 1968, to join the San Francisco 49ers' coaching staff; believing he could only have played one more season, at most.

Wiggin spent his entire 11-year playing career with Cleveland until his retirement following the 1967 NFL season. He never missed a game, playing in 146 straight games. From 1961 to 1966, he started all 14 games every year (chiefly at left defensive end). Wiggin twice earned Pro Bowl honors as a starter (1965, 1967).

Over his career, Wiggins had 19 fumble recoveries, including four in 1966, and a league leading four in 1967. He had three interceptions, including a 20-yard touchdown return, and 60½ sacks. His career high in sacks was nine in 1960. Over his career, the Browns were in three NFL championship games (winning one), and lost in two divisional playoff games in other years (1958, 1967). As of 2026, he is: tied for first all-time in fumble recoveries among Browns' defensive players, sixth in sacks, and 19th in games played. As a professional, he played at 242 pounds (109 kg) or 245 lb (111.1 kg). One of his reasons for retiring in 1967 was that he believed he was becoming too light to play the defensive line in the NFL.

== Coaching and personnel career ==
=== San Francisco 49ers ===
Wiggin was named an assistant coach with the San Francisco 49ers on February 14, 1968, spending the next seven seasons with the team. He was defensive line coach from 1968 to 1973, and both defensive coordinator and defensive line coach in 1974, under head coach Dick Nolan each of those years. He coached Pro Bowl defensive end Cedrick Hardman, who had 18 quarterback sacks in his first full (14-game) season (1971). He also coached defensive end Tommy Hart who had 17 sacks in 1972. The 49ers won three consecutive division titles (1970 to 1972) and were in the NFC championship games in 1970 and 1971. In 1972, the 49ers led the NFL in sacks.

=== Kansas City Chiefs ===
Wiggin was hired as head coach of the Kansas City Chiefs on January 23, 1975, replacing future Hall of Fame coach Hank Stram. The team was aging and in some disarray when he arrived as the new head coach. After compiling an 11–24 mark in less than three seasons, Wiggin was fired following a 44–7 loss against his old team, the Browns, on October 30, 1977, that left the team 1–6.

=== New Orleans Saints ===
After Dick Nolan was named as head coach of the New Orleans Saints in 1978 he once again hired Wiggin. Wiggin became the team's defensive coordinator, spending two years with the Saints. Minnesota Viking coach Bud Grant had also offered Wiggin an assistant's position, but Wiggin chose Nolan with whom he was so familiar. In their first 11 years as an NFL team (1967 to 1977), the Saints had never won more than five games in a season and were 3–11 in 1977. In 1978, the Saints were 7–9 and then 8–8 in 1979, the first time they did not have a losing season.

=== Stanford Cardinal ===
Less than two months after the end of the 1979 NFL season, Wiggin was hired as head coach at his alma mater, Stanford, on February 1, 1980. Despite the presence of future Hall of Fame quarterback John Elway on the team during Wiggin's first three years, Wiggin was unable to lead Stanford to a bowl game during his tenure and was dismissed following the 1983 season with a 16–28 record over four years. Wiggin's efforts to reach a bowl game had come agonizingly close in 1982, when his team fell victim to what simply became known as "The Play" on November 20. In an incredible finish against California, the school's arch-rival lateraled five times in the closing seconds to score the winning touchdown.

=== Minnesota Vikings ===
Wiggin's longest football connection was his four decades with the Minnesota Vikings. In 1985, he became the Vikings defensive line coach under Bud Grant, a position he held through 1991; though under head coach Jerry Burns from 1986 to 1991. Some of the Vikings defensive linemen who Wiggins developed include pro football Hall of Fame members Chris Doleman and an undrafted John Randle; first-team All-Pro Keith Millard; and Pro Bowl player Henry Thomas. Wiggin fought to keep Randle on the Vikings when defensive coordinator Floyd Peters believed Randall was too small and wanted to cut him.

In 1989, the Vikings defense produced 71 quarterback sacks in a 16-game season, the second best ever in a single season. Doleman had 21 sacks and Millard 18. Only the 1984 Chicago Bears had more sacks in a season (72); but Wiggin would point out that the 1989 Vikings' defensive lineman had 61½ sacks and the 1984 Bears' lineman had 51½ sacks.

The 1989 Vikings' defense gave up the fewest total yards and passing yards in the NFL; and third fewest rushing yards (just 57 yards more than the NFL team leader that season). In 1988, the Vikings' defense likewise gave up the fewest total yards in the NFL; the second fewest points and passing yards, and third fewest rushing yards.

In 1992, the Vikings hired Wiggin in a scouting capacity and as an assistant general manager. Wiggin was made the head of the team's new professional personnel department, which he built up as it did not previously exist. He started with 11 people, which grew to over 200 staff in the ensuing decades. In 2005, he was moved to a consultant role. As of 2023, the 88-year old Wiggin was still working as a senior consultant for the Vikings in evaluating players; and working 30 hours a week breaking down game film of opposing teams' offensive and defensive lines to show Vikings' linemen.

== Legacy and honors ==
Wiggin was inducted into the College Football Hall of Fame in 2005. At the time of Wiggin's death, National Football Foundation chairman Archie Manning said of Wiggin

Paul Wiggin represented everything the NFF College Football Hall of Fame aspires to honor, specifically excellence on the field, leadership on the sidelines, and a lifelong commitment to the game . . . His impact on college football spanned generations, and he leaves behind a legacy that will long be remembered.

In 2008, Wiggin was inducted into the Browns Legend Club. He is a member of the Modesto Junior College Athletics Hall of Fame. He received the 2022 Bud Grant Distinguished Minnesotan Award by the Minnesota Chapter of the National Football Foundation.

Hall of Fame coach Paul Brown said that Wiggin was one of the three best defensive ends on the Browns during Brown's time with the team (1946 to 1962), along with John Yonaker and Len Ford. Vikings' general manager Jeff Diamond said of Wiggins, "'He was such a classy guy . . . He was just very even-keel. And a great coach and eye for talent'".

== Personal life and death ==
In 1956, Wiggin married Stanford student Carolynn Curlee Clark, who had been selected a beauty queen a number of times in her native New Mexico. They had three children. During the offseason in his playing years, he was a high school history teacher. Wiggin assumed he would continue teaching full time after retiring as a player; before becoming a coach and football executive instead for over 50 years.

Wiggin was a part of the 1984 Los Angeles Summer Olympic Games Organizing Committee.

Wiggin died on December 12, 2025, at the age of 91.

== Head coaching record ==
=== College ===
Year	Team	Overall	Conference	Standing	Bowl/playoffs
Stanford Cardinals / Cardinal (Pacific-10 Conference) (1980–1983)
1980	Stanford	6–5	3–4	T–6th	
1981	Stanford	4–7	4–4	T–6th	
1982	Stanford	5–6	3–5	7th	
1983	Stanford	1–10	1–7	10th	
Stanford:		16–28	11–20		
Total:		16–28			

=== NFL ===
Team	Year	Regular season					Postseason			
Team	Year	Won	Lost	Ties	Win %	Finish	Won	Lost	Win %	Result
KC	1975	5	9	0	.357	3rd in AFC West	—	—	—	—
KC	1976	5	9	0	.357	4th in AFC West	—	—	—	—
KC	1977	1	6	0	.143	Fired	—	—	—	—
Total		11	24	0	.314		0	0	.000	
