= Jim Phillips (American football) =

American football player (1936–2015)

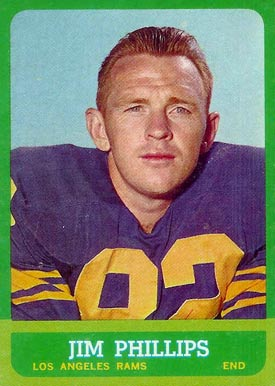
- Phillips on a 1963 trading card

No. 82
- Position: Wide receiver

Personal information
- Born: February 5, 1936; Alexander City, Alabama, U.S.
- Died: March 25, 2015 (aged 79); Auburn, Alabama, U.S.
- Listed height: 6 ft 1 in (1.85 m)
- Listed weight: 197 lb (89 kg)

Career information
- High school: Benjamin Russell (Alexander City)
- College: Auburn (1954–1957)
- NFL draft: 1958: 1st round, 5th overall pick

Career history

Playing
- Los Angeles Rams (1958–1964); Minnesota Vikings (1965–1967)

Coaching
- Atlanta Falcons (1968) Receivers coach; San Diego Chargers (1969–1971) Receivers coach; New Orleans Saints (1974–1975) Receivers coach

Awards and highlights
- First-team All-Pro (1961); Second-team All-Pro (1960); 3× Pro Bowl (1960–1962); NFL receptions leader (1961); National champion (1957); List of unanimous All-Americans in college football (1957); First-team All-SEC (1957); 2× Second-team All-SEC (1955, 1956)

Career NFL statistics
- Receptions: 401
- Receiving yards: 6,044
- Receiving touchdowns: 34
- Stats at Pro Football Reference

James Jackson "Red" Phillips (February 5, 1936 – March 25, 2015) was an American professional football player who played wide receiver and tight end over 10 seasons with the Los Angeles Rams and the Minnesota Vikings of the National Football League (NFL) from 1958 to 1967. Phillips was the fifth player selected in the 1958 NFL draft. He was a three-time Pro Bowler as a Ram from 1960 to 1962 and was a first-team All-Pro in 1961, after leading the NFL in pass receptions that 14-game season (78). He caught 52, 78, 60, and 54 passes from 1960 to 1963, respectively; but his career changed course when he suffered a rare infection to his right hand before the 1964 season, that ultimately required multiple surgeries and undermined his ability to play in 1964 and 1965. At the time his professional playing career ended in 1967, he was in the top-10 all-time in receptions in NFL history (12th in NFL/AFL history) and top-20 all-time in total receiving yards in NFL/AFL history.

Phillips played college football for the Auburn Tigers in the Southeastern Conference (SEC), where he excelled as both a receiver and defensive end. He was named a unanimous All-American his senior year at Auburn, when he was co-captain of their 1957 national championship team. He was second-team All-SEC in 1955 and 1956, and first-team All-SEC in 1957, as well as the SEC's Lineman of the Year in 1957. In 2004, he was honored as among the Southeastern Conference Football Legends.

== Early life ==
Phillips was born on February 5, 1936, in Alexander City, Alabama, the son of Leon Washington and Gaytha (Mann) Phillips. He attended Benjamin Russell High School in Alexander City, graduating in 1954. He was a member of the Key Club, Benjamin Russell's honorary scholastic organization. Phillips had red hair, and had the nicknames "Red" and "Big Red" in high school.

Phillips played on the school's football team. In 1953, Benjamin Russell won the Class AA second district high school football championship in Alabama. Phillips was a co-captain on that team, as a senior. He scored 10 touchdowns in eight games, and had 33 completions in 38 passing attempts. Phillips was twice named a high school All-State player in football. In addition to being named All-State in 1953, he was named to the All-Southern high school team and was an All-American and/or honorable mention All-American. He was selected to play in the 1964 Alabama High School Athletic Association all-star football game.

Phillips also played center on Benjamin Russell's basketball team, and was one of the team's best players. He was All-District and All-County in basketball as a senior. He participated in the discus throw and shot put on the school's track and field team, finishing second and third respectively in the Alabama statewide track meet his senior year.

In January 1958, during a day of celebrations for Phillips in Alexander City, Benjamin Russell's Letter Club presented Phillips with a plaque that read "'Presented to Jimmy (Red) Phillips for possessing those qualities of heart and mind which make a true All-American, not only in sports but in every phase of his life – those qualities of industry, humility and friendliness which have proved an inspiration to all Benjamin Russell High School students'".

== College career ==
Phillips received a grant-in-aid to attend Auburn University (then known as Alabama Polytechnic Institute), where he was a student in Auburn's School of Education. He played on the freshman football team in 1954. Phillips's fans from Alexander City would drive in large groups to watch him play freshman football at Auburn.

Phillips played varsity football as a wide receiver and defensive end for the Auburn Tigers from 1955 to 1957 in the Southeastern Conference (SEC), never missing a game. During those three years, he had a total of 52 receptions for 1,019 yards and nine touchdowns. Phillips wore jersey No. 88 at Auburn, and continued to be known by the nicknames "Red" and "Big Red" Phillips as he had been in high school.

After finishing his Auburn career, Phillips identified his greatest game as Auburn's 14–12 win over Georgia Tech on October 15, 1955; during his sophomore year. Auburn was behind 12–7 in the fourth quarter of the game, and drove 80 yards to score the winning touchdown. During that drive, Phillips had three pass receptions against a desperate Georgia Tech defense; the last of which set up the game winning touchdown. He was also described as being "equally good on defense" in that game in limiting Georgia Tech's running backs. The Associated Press (AP) selected Phillips as college football's Lineman of the Week for his play in that game, a rare honor for a sophomore. In 1955, he led Auburn with 14 receptions for 272 yards, and had one touchdown reception. He was named the SEC's sophomore of the year. The AP named Phillips second-team All-SEC that year.

In 1956, Phillips led the SEC in receptions (23), receiving yards (383), and receiving touchdowns (four). He was named second-team All-SEC by the Associated Press. In Phillips's senior year (1957), Auburn was 10–0 and ranked as the No. 1 college football team by the Associated Press at the end of the season. Phillips had 15 receptions for 357 yards and four touchdowns that year, leading the SEC in receiving yards and receiving touchdowns. Phillips was sixth in Heisman Trophy voting in 1957, and was a unanimous All-America selection that year. He was named the SEC's Lineman of the Year, was an Associated Press unanimous All-SEC selection, and was named an All-SEC tri-captain by the AP along with Lou Michaels and Jim Taylor.

Phillips also excelled on defense in 1957. After Auburn defeated the Tennessee Volunteers in a late September 1957 game, 7–0, the Tennessee sports press lauded Phillips's defensive play as key to Auburn's win; including a forced fumble and fumble recovery, and two quarterback sacks, at critical times in the game to stop Tennessee's offense.

After the 1957 season ended, he was chosen to play in the East-West Shrine Game, the Senior Bowl, the Hula Bowl, and the Chicago College All-Star Game. He was a team captain in the Senior Bowl.

== NFL career ==
=== Los Angeles Rams ===
The Los Angeles Rams drafted Phillips in the first round of the 1958 NFL draft, fifth overall. He played flanker and tight end during his seven seasons with the Rams. As a rookie in 1958, playing under head coach Sid Gillman, Phillips started eight of the Rams' 12 games. He had 35 receptions for 524 yards, with two receiving touchdowns. Phillips led the NFL with the longest reception for that season, a 93 yard reception of a Billy Wade pass against the Green Bay Packers. Phillips had eight total receptions in that game, for 208 yards.

In 1959, Phillips started eight of the nine games in which he appeared, with 37 receptions for 541 yards and four touchdowns. He had two touchdown receptions in a mid-October game against the Chicago Bears (27 yards and 39 yards). He missed playing time that season with a rib injury.

In 1960, Phillips was selected to play in the Pro Bowl, and was named second-team All-Pro by the AP and United Press International (UPI). He started all 12 Rams' games for the first time in his career, now playing under head coach Bob Waterfield on a Rams team that finished the season with a 4–7–1 record. He led the Rams in receptions (52), receiving yards (883), and receiving touchdowns (eight). Phillips was third in the NFL in receptions, fifth in receiving yards and receiving yards per game, and seventh in receiving touchdowns. He caught two touchdowns in a single game three times that season. In an October 30 game against the Detroit Lions Phillips caught touchdown passes of 58 and 31 yards. The following week against the Dallas Cowboys he caught touchdown passes of 61 and 5 yards, and had 151 total receiving yards on seven receptions. Phillips caught touchdown passes of nine and 31 yards against the Green Bay Packers on November 20.

Phillips had his best season in 1961. He led the NFL in total receptions with 78 and ranked third in the league with 1,092 receiving yards. He also had five receiving touchdowns. Phillips played tight end that season. He was again selected to play in the Pro Bowl. The AP and UPI selected Phillips as a first-team All-Pro, and the Newspaper Enterprise Association (NEA) named him a second-team All-Pro.

Phillips started all 14 games for a 1961 Rams team that had a 4–10 record. Phillips gained over 100 yards receiving in five games that year. He had nine receptions for 163 yards against the Chicago Bears, eight receptions for 154 yards against the New York Giants, three receptions for 107 yards (including a 69-yard touchdown) against the Detroit Lions the first time the teams played that season and eight receptions for 117 yards the second time they met, and 13 receptions for 101 yards against the Green Bay Packers.

In 1962, Phillips led the Rams in receptions (60), receiving yards (875), and receiving touchdowns (five). He was fourth in the NFL in receptions, and was chosen to play in the Pro Bowl for a third consecutive season. Phillips started all 14 games that season for a Rams team that won only a single game in 1962, with Waterfield resigning as coach after eight games and being replaced by defensive coach Harland Svare. Playing under Svare, the Rams were 5–9 in 1963. Phillips played both flanker and tight end, again leading the team in receptions (54) and receiving yards (793). He was eighth in receptions in the NFL.

Phillips started only six games in 1964. During training camp in 1964, he was infected with a rare skin fungus on his right hand that eventually kept him from playing and required surgery. He missed at least half of the 1964 season. Phillips ultimately had three surgeries on the hand.

In 1964 with the Rams, Phillips had 17 receptions for 245 yards and two touchdowns before his season ended. This was his final season with the Rams. During his seven-year Rams career, Phillips started 76 games and had 333 receptions for 4,953 yards (14.9 yards per catch), with 27 touchdowns. At the time, only Pro Football Hall of Fame receivers Tom Fears and Elroy Hirsch had more career receptions playing for the Rams.

=== Minnesota Vikings ===
In December 1964, the Rams traded Phillips and defensive tackle Gary Larsen to the Minnesota Vikings for wide receiver Jack Snow. Elroy Hirsch was the Rams' general manager at the time of the trade. Phillips's playing ability was still limited in 1965 by the consequences of his hand infection. Phillips had his third surgery on June 2, and spent eight days in the hospital receiving intravenous medication; losing 15 pounds during the process. He was still able to attend training camp and start 10 games for the Vikings that season; but his 15 receptions for 185 yards were career lows. He started nine games for the Vikings the next season (1966), playing flanker, and was third on the team with 32 receptions and second on the Vikings with 554 receiving yards. He also had two touchdown receptions.

Phillips started 13 games for the Vikings in 1967, with 21 receptions for 352 yards and three touchdowns. In February 1968, Phillips announced his retirement as a player, and that he was going to become a coach with the Atlanta Falcons. At the time he retired, Phillips had a career total of 401 receptions for 6,044 yards. His 401 receptions was the eighth most in NFL history at the time, and 11th most in NFL/AFL history. His total receiving yardage was 17th most in NFL/AFL history at that time, and 12th in NFL history.

== Coaching career ==
Phillips expressed his interest in coaching football while still attending Auburn as a student, though at the time it was his hope of one day coaching at Benjamin Russell High School. When he retired as a player before the 1968 season to join the Atlanta Falcons coaching staff, Falcons' head coach Norb Hecker said Phillips's "'knowledge of defenses and ability to work with young receivers will be very valuable to us'". Hecker was fired after three games during the 1968 season, and replaced by Norm Van Brocklin as head coach. Van Brocklin had been Phillips's head coach in Minnesota in 1965 and 1966. When he came on in October 1968, Van Brocklin asked the assistant coaches, including Phillips, to remain with the team; but later fired them days after the season ended, stating at the time "'I want to make it clear . . . that this is no reflection on these men personally or professionally'".

He attempted to come back as a player with the Rams in 1969, and was one of the last players released in training camp before the season started. In mid-October 1969, Phillips was hired as a receivers coach by the San Diego Chargers of the American Football League (AFL). The Chargers were coached by Sid Gillman, who was also the team's general manager. Gillman had been Phillips's first professional coach with the Rams in 1958 and 1959. Harland Svare, who had also coached Phillips as a player with the Rams, replaced Gillman as the Chargers' coach during the 1971 season; and at the end of the season he fired the entire coaching staff, including Phillips, to give the team an entirely fresh start. Phillips had coached three years with the Chargers. In 1969, the Chargers were fourth in the AFL (out of 10 teams) in total passing yardage. In 1970, the Chargers were eighth in the NFL (out of 26 teams) in passing yardage, and in 1971 the Chargers were first in the NFL in total passing yardage (out of 26 teams).

Phillips next coached two seasons at Florida State University, beginning in 1972 under head coach Larry Jones. In 1972, Florida State's senior receiver Barry Smith led all college football receivers with 1,243 yards, and was second nationally with 69 receptions. Florida State was the only school that had two of the top 20 players nationally in receptions (Smith and Gary Parris). Smith attributed his development in the precision with which he ran his receiving patterns to Phillips, who guided Smith in learning about his flaws as a receiver and how to improve upon them. Jones resigned after the 1973 season and his assistant coaches, including Phillips, were not given assurances that they would remain in their jobs under a new coach.

Phillips was hired in January 1974 to serve as the receivers coach for the New Orleans Saints under coach John North. Early in the 1975 season, coach North switched Phillips to special teams coach. North was fired after six games that season. Phillips remained on the coaching staff, but perceived his job to be in jeopardy after the end of the season. The Saints new head coach in 1976, Hank Stram, did not include Phillips on his coaching staff.

== Legacy and honors ==
In January 1958, Alexander City honored Phillips with a "Red Phillips Day" or "Jimmy Phillips Appreciation Day" celebration. A parade for Phillips that day had five to six thousand attendees, even with an intermittent rain. Alexander City's total population at the time was 12,500. In 1958, Phillips also received the Cliff Hare Award, Auburn's highest honor for a student-athlete.

Elroy Hirsch, the Rams general manager and a Hall of Fame receiver, said of Phillips in 1961 that Phillips was "'as good as any end I've ever seen at getting yardage after catching a short pass'".

In 1976, the Birmingham Monday Morning Quarterback Club selected its All-Time Southeastern Conference Team, covering a period of 25 years, and named Phillips to the team as a defensive player. Phillips was inducted into Alabama Sports Hall of Fame in 1985. In October 2004 Phillips was named as Auburn's SEC Football Legend, among 12 total honorees that year, with the SEC Football Legends honor being presented to them before the December 4, 2004 SEC Championship Game.

== NFL career statistics ==
Legend
	Won the NFL championship
	Led the league
**Bold**	Career high

=== Regular season ===
Year	Team	Games		Receiving				
Year	Team	GP	GS	Rec	Yds	Avg	Lng	TD
1958	RAM	12	8	35	524	15.0	**93**	2
1959	RAM	9	8	37	541	14.6	64	4
1960	RAM	12	12	52	883	**17.0**	61	**8**
1961	RAM	**14**	**14**	**78**	**1,092**	14.0	69	5
1962	RAM	**14**	**14**	60	875	14.6	65	5
1963	RAM	**14**	**14**	54	793	14.7	52	1
1964	RAM	7	6	17	245	14.4	33	2
1965	MIN	12	9	15	185	12.3	43	1
1966	MIN	12	11	32	554	17.3	68	3
1967	MIN	13	9	21	352	16.8	42	3
Career		119	105	401	6,044	15.1	93	34

== Personal life ==
Phillips married "Mickey" Kennedy in 1957. They had three children. After frequently moving around during Phillips's years as an assistant coach, they decided to settle down to a small-town life in Alexander City. Phillips ran a successful insurance business and was appointed to the Alabama Department of Insurance. He once ran for elective office to become a member of Alabama's Legislature, and came in third in a field of five candidates.

Phillips died on March 25, 2015, at Bethany House (Hospice) in Auburn. It was also reported that he died in Alexander City.
