= 1955 All-SEC football team =

American college football all-star team

The 1955 All-SEC football team consists of American football players selected to the All-Southeastern Conference (SEC) chosen by various selectors for the 1955 college football season. Ole Miss won the conference.

== All-SEC selections ==
=== Ends ===
- Howard Schnellenberger, Kentucky (AP-1, UP-1)
- Joe Tuminello, LSU (AP-1, UP-1)
- Jimmy Phillips, Auburn (AP-2, UP-2)
- Nick Germanus, Alabama (AP-3, UP-2)
- Joe Stephenson, Vanderbilt (AP-2, UP-3)
- Roy Wilkins, Georgia (AP-3, UP-3)

=== Tackles ===
- Frank D'Agostino, Auburn (AP-1, UP-1)
- Earl Leggett, LSU (AP-1, UP-1)
- M. L. Bracket, Auburn (AP-2, UP-2)
- Charley Rader, Tennessee (AP-2, UP-2)
- Carl Vereen, Georgia Tech (UP-3)
- Jim Barron, Miss. St. (AP-3, UP-3)

=== Guards ===
- Scott Suber, Miss. St. (AP-1, UP-1)
- Franklin Brooks, Georgia Tech (AP-1, UP-1)
- Tony Sardisco, Tulane (AP-2, UP-2)
- Vaughn Allison, Ole Miss (AP-2, UP-3)
- Larry Frank, Vanderbilt (AP-3, UP-2)
- Bryan Burnthorne, Tulane (AP-3, UP-3)

=== Centers ===
- Steve DeLaTorre, Florida (AP-1, UP-1)
- Jimmy Morris, Georgia Tech (UP-2)
- Gene Dubuisson, Ole Miss (AP-2, UP-3)
- Bob Scarbrough, Auburn (AP-3)

=== Quarterbacks ===
- Eagle Day, Ole Miss (AP-3, UP-1)
- Bob Hardy, Kentucky (AP-2, UP-2)
- Wade Mitchell, Georgia Tech (UP-3)

=== Halfbacks ===
- Johnny Majors, Tennessee (College Football Hall of Fame) (AP-1, UP-1)
- Fob James, Auburn (AP-1, UP-1)
- Charley Horton, Vanderbilt (AP-1, UP-2)
- Art Davis, Miss. St. (AP-2, UP-2)
- George Volkert, Georgia Tech (AP-2, UP-3)
- Jackie Simpson, Florida (AP-3, UP-3)
- Billy Kinard, Ole Miss (AP-3)

=== Fullbacks ===
- Paige Cothren, Ole Miss (AP-1, UP-3)
- Joe Childress, Auburn (AP-2, UP-1)
- Ronnie Quilan, Tulane (AP-3, UP-2)

== Key ==
AP = Associated Press.

UP = United Press.

Bold = Consensus first-team selection by both AP and UP

== See also ==
- 1955 College Football All-America Team
