= Billy Stacy =

American football player (1936–2019)

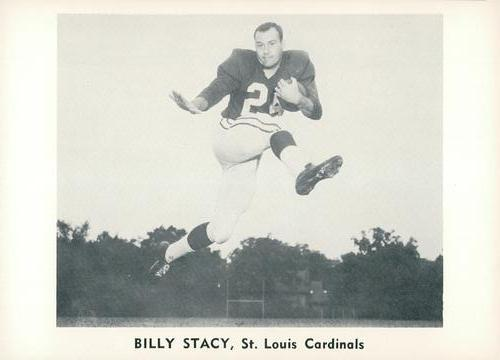

No. 24
- Positions: Safety, cornerback

Personal information
- Born: July 30, 1936; Drew, Mississippi, U.S.
- Died: September 10, 2019 (aged 83); Starkville, Mississippi, U.S.
- Listed height: 6 ft 1 in (1.85 m)
- Listed weight: 191 lb (87 kg)

Career information
- College: Mississippi State
- NFL draft: 1959: 1st round, 3rd overall pick

Career history
- Chicago / St. Louis Cardinals (1959–1963)

Awards and highlights
- Pro Bowl (1961); Second-team All-American (1957); 2× First-team All-SEC (1956, 1957); Second-team All-SEC (1958)

Career NFL statistics
- Interceptions: 20
- Fumble recoveries: 7
- Total touchdowns: 7
- Stats at Pro Football Reference

Billy McGovern Stacy (July 30, 1936 – September 10, 2019) was an American professional football player who played five seasons in the National Football League (NFL) for the Chicago/St. Louis Cardinals. He was selected to one Pro Bowl. He later served as mayor of Starkville, Mississippi (1985–1989).

He was the last player in NFL history to record a touchdown reception, a fumble return touchdown, and an interception return touchdown in a single season until J. J. Watt did so in 2014.

== See also ==
- List of NCAA major college yearly punt and kickoff return leaders
