= Hardiman Cureton =

American gridiron football player (1933–2003)

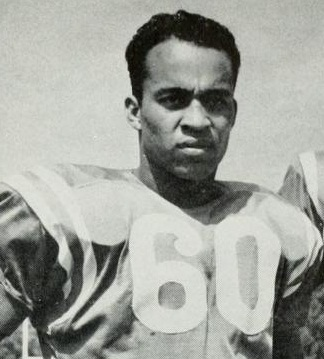

Profile
- Positions: Guard, Linebacker

Personal information
- Born: December 8, 1933; Duarte, California, U.S.
- Died: October 1, 2003 (aged 69); Richmond, Virginia, U.S.

Career information
- College: UCLA
- NFL draft: 1956: 26th round, 312th overall pick

Career history
- 1956: Toronto Argonauts
- 1957–1959: Ottawa Rough Riders
- 1960–1964: Hamilton Tiger-Cats

Awards and highlights
- Grey Cup champion (1963); 5× CFL East All-Star (1956, 1958, 1961, 1962, 1963); National champion (1954); Consensus All-American (1955); First-team All-PCC (1955); Second-team All-PCC (1954)

Hardiman Cureton (December 8, 1933 – October 1, 2003) was an American player of Canadian football.

He played high school football for the Monrovia Wildcats. He played the tackle position.

Cureton was a dominant offensive guard and also played on the defensive line for three seasons (1953-54-55) on UCLA football teams that went 26-4 and captured three Pacific Coast Conference championships and participated in two Rose Bowls. During the 1954 national championship season, Cureton was named second-team All-Coast and honorable mention All-American. As a senior in 1955, Cureton became the Bruins' fifth-ever consensus first-team All-American as well as being named all-conference and team captain—the first African-American captain to lead a UCLA football team. In 1955, Cureton was selected to play in the Hula Bowl. He left the United States to avoid being drafted and later played for nine years in the Canadian Football League for Toronto, Ottawa and Hamilton.

Cureton was traded to Hamilton by Ottawa on August 15, 1960 for Angelo Mosca. Cureton had become a successful ice cream salesman in Toronto and had threatened legal action against the Rough Riders if they did not give him his release. With the trade, he was able to keep both his football job (in Hamilton) and his ice cream job.

Hardiman Cureton, OG 1956 Toronto Argonauts (CFL)

Hardiman Cureton, OG 1957–1959 Ottawa Rough Riders (CFL)

Hardiman Cureton, LB 1960–1964 Hamilton Tiger-Cats (CFL)

A plaque on the statue of Andres Duarte across from the City Hall of Duarte partially reads: Hardiman, Frances, Lucius, and the Curetons.
