= Frank D'Agostino =

American football player (1934–1997)

No. 66, 61
- Positions: Tackle, guard

Personal information
- Born: March 11, 1934; Philadelphia, Pennsylvania, U.S.
- Died: September 28, 1997 (aged 63); Tampa, Florida, U.S.
- Listed height: 6 ft 1 in (1.85 m)
- Listed weight: 245 lb (111 kg)

Career information
- High school: Northeast Catholic (Philadelphia)
- College: Auburn (1952–1955)
- NFL draft: 1956: 2nd round, 16th overall pick

Career history
- Philadelphia Eagles (1956); Hamilton Tiger-Cats (1957); New York Titans (1960)

Awards and highlights
- First-team All-American (1955); First-team All-SEC (1955); Second-team All-SEC (1954)

Career NFL/AFL statistics
- Games played: 14
- Games started: 5
- Stats at Pro Football Reference

Francis Joseph D'Agostino (March 11, 1934 – September 28, 1997) was an American football player. D'Agostino attended Auburn University and played college football at the tackle position for the Auburn Tigers football team. He was selected by the Associated Press and the American Football Coaches Association as a first-team player on their respective 1955 College Football All-America Teams. He was selected by the Philadelphia Eagles in the second round (16th overall pick) of the 1956 NFL draft. He appeared in 12 games for the Eagles during the 1956 NFL season. In 1960, D'Agostino played in the new American Football League, appearing in two games for the New York Titans (later renamed the New York Jets) during the 1960 AFL season.
