= Fred Robinson (gridiron football, born 1930) =

American gridiron football player (1930–2021)

No. 64, 63, 53, 52, 55
- Position: Guard

Personal information
- Born: September 2, 1930; New Haven, Connecticut, U.S.
- Died: June 4, 2021 (aged 90); Rialto, California, U.S.
- Listed height: 6 ft 1 in (1.85 m)
- Listed weight: 242 lb (110 kg)

Career information
- High school: West Haven (West Haven, Connecticut); Suffield Academy (Suffield, Connecticut)
- College: Washington (1950–1951, 1954–1955)
- NFL draft: 1955: 14th round, 169th overall pick

Career history
- BC Lions (1956); Cleveland Browns (1957); Toronto Argonauts (1958); Ottawa Rough Riders (1960–1961); Hamilton Tiger-Cats (1962); Quebec / Toronto Rifles (1964-1966)

Awards and highlights
- Grey Cup champion (1960); First-team All-PCC (1955)

Career NFL statistics
- Games played: 12
- Games started: 7
- Fumble recoveries: 1
- Stats at Pro Football Reference

Frederick Leroy Robinson Jr. (September 2, 1930 – June 4, 2021) was an American professional football player for the Toronto Argonauts, Hamilton Tiger-Cats, Ottawa Rough Riders and BC Lions. He won the Grey Cup with Ottawa in 1960. He played college football at the University of Washington and was drafted in the 1955 NFL draft by the Cleveland Browns (Round 14, #169). He played with Cleveland briefly in 1957.
