= 1956 All-America college football team =

Official list of the best college football players of 1956

The 1956 All-America college football team is composed of college football players who were selected as All-Americans by various organizations and writers that chose All-America college football teams in 1956. The seven selectors recognized by the NCAA as "official" for the 1956 season are (1) the American Football Coaches Association (AFCA), (2) the Associated Press (AP), (3) the Football Writers Association of America (FWAA), (4) the International News Service (INS), (5) the Newspaper Enterprise Association (NEA), (6) the Sporting News (SN), and (8) the United Press (UP).

== Consensus All-Americans ==
For the year 1956, the NCAA recognizes seven published All-American teams as "official" designations for purposes of its consensus determinations. The following chart identifies the NCAA-recognized consensus All-Americans and displays which first-team designations they received.

Name	Position	School	Number	Official	Other
Ron Kramer	End	Michigan	7/7	AFCA, AP, FWAA, INS, NEA, SN, UP	CP, WC
Joe Walton	End	Pittsburgh	7/7	AFCA, AP, FWAA, INS, NEA, SN, UP	CP, WC
Jim Parker	Guard	Ohio State	7/7	AFCA, AP, FWAA, INS, NEA, SN, UP	CP, WC
Bill Glass	Guard	Baylor	7/7	AFCA, AP, FWAA, INS, NEA, SN, UP	WC
Jerry Tubbs	Center	Oklahoma	7/7	AFCA, AP, FWAA, INS, NEA, SN, UP	CP, WC
Jim Brown	Back	Syracuse	7/7	AFCA, AP, FWAA, INS, NEA, SN, UP	CP, WC
Johnny Majors	Back	Tennessee	7/7	AFCA, AP, FWAA, INS, NEA, SN, UP	WC
John Witte	Tackle	Oregon State	6/7	AFCA, AP, FWAA, INS, NEA, UP	CP, WC
Tommy McDonald	Back	Oklahoma	6/7	AFCA, AP, FWAA, INS, SN, UP	CP, WC
John Brodie	Quarterback	Stanford	4/7	AFCA, FWAA, INS, NEA	WC
Lou Michaels	Tackle	Kentucky	3/7	AFCA, NEA, UP	WC

== All-American selections for 1956 ==
=== Ends ===
- Ron Kramer, Michigan (College Football Hall of Fame) (AFCA; AP-1; UP-1; SN; INS-1; CP-1; NEA-1; WC; FWAA)
- Joe Walton, Pittsburgh (AFCA; AP-1; UP-1; SN; CO-1; INS-1; CP-1; NEA-1; WC; FWAA)
- Buddy Cruze, Tennessee (AP-3; UP-2; INS-2; CP-2; NEA-2;FWAA)
- Bill Steiger, Washington State (AP-2, FWAA)
- Walter Brodie, William & Mary (AP-2)
- Lamar Lundy, Purdue (UP-2; INS-2; NEA-3)
- Tom Maentz, Michigan (UP-3; CP-3; NEA-3)
- Paul Lopata, Yale (AP-3)
- Frank Gilliam, Iowa (UP-3; NEA-2)
- Jack Johnson, Miami (CP-2)
- Brad Bomba, Indiana (CP-3)
- Ernie Pitts, Denver (INS-2)
- John Bell, Oklahoma (INS-2)

=== Tackles ===
- John Witte, Oregon State (AFCA, AP-1; FWAA UP-1; CO-1; INS-1; CP-1; NEA-1; WC)
- Lou Michaels, Kentucky (College Football Hall of Fame) (AP-2; UP-1; CO-1; INS-2; CP-2; NEA-1; WC-1)
- Alex Karras, Iowa , (College and Pro Football Hall of Fame) (AP-1; UP-2; INS-2; CP-1; NEA-2; FWAA)
- Charlie Krueger, Texas A&M (AP-3, INS-1, CP-3)
- Norm Hamilton, TCU (CP-3; NEA-2; FWAA)
- Bob Hobert, Minnesota (AP-3; UP-3; NEA-3; FWAA)
- Paul Wiggin, Stanford (AP-2; UP-2, SN, INS-2)
- Ed Gray, Oklahoma (SN)
- Mike Sandusky, Maryland (CP-2)
- Esker Harris, UCLA (AP-2)

=== Guards ===
- Jim Parker, Ohio State (College and Pro Football Hall of Fame) (AFCA, AP-1; UP-1; SN; INS-1; CP-1; NEA-1; WC; FWAA)
- Bill Glass, Baylor (College Football Hall of Fame) (AFCA, AP-1; UP-1; SN; CO-1; INS-1; CP-2; NEA-1; WC-1; FWAA)
- Sam Valentine, Penn State (AP-2; UP-2; INS-2; CP-1; NEA-2; NEA-2; FWAA)
- John Barrow, Florida (Canadian Football Hall of Fame)(AP-3 CP-3; NEA-3; FWAA)
- Allen Ecker, Georgia Tech (UP-2; INS-2; CP-3)
- Dick Day, Washington (AP-3)
- Stan Slater, Army (UP-3)
- Bill Krisher, Oklahoma (UP-3)
- John Owselchik, Yale (CP-2; NEA-3)
- Dan Currie, Michigan State (INS-2)

=== Centers ===
- Jerry Tubbs, Oklahoma (College Football Hall of Fame) (AFCA, AP-1; UP-1; INS-1; CP-1; NEA-1; WC; FWAA)
- Don Stephenson, Georgia Tech (AP-2; UP-3; SN; NEA-3; FWAA)
- John Matsko, Michigan State (AP-3; UP-2; INS-2; CP-3; NEA-2)
- Don Suchy, Iowa (INS-2; CP-2)
- Jim Matheny, UCLA (INS-2)

=== Quarterbacks ===
- John Brodie, Stanford (College Football Hall of Fame) (AFCA, AP-3; UP-2; CO-1; INS-1; CP-2; NEA-1; WC-1; FWAA-1)
- Paul Hornung, Notre Dame (Heisman Trophy winner and College and Pro Football Hall of Fame) (AP-2; UP-1; INS-2; CP-1; NEA-2; FWAA-1)
- Claude Benham, Columbia (INS-2; NEA-3)
- Len Dawson, Purdue (UP-3)
- Gene Newton, Tulane (CP-3)

=== Backs ===
- Jim Brown, Syracuse (College and Pro Football Hall of Fame) (AFCA; AP-1; UP-1; CO-1; INS-1; CP-1; NEA-1; WC; FWAA)
- Johnny Majors, Tennessee (College Football Hall of Fame) (AFCA; AP-1; UP-1; CO-1; INS-1; CP-2; NEA-1; WC; FWAA)
- Tommy McDonald, Oklahoma (College and Pro Football Hall of Fame) (AFCA; AP-1; UP-1; CO-1; INS-1; CP-1; NEA-2; WC; FWAA)
- Jack Pardee, Texas A&M (College Football Hall of Fame) (UP-3; INS-2; CP-1; NEA-2; FWAA)
- Jim Crawford, Wyoming (AP-3; UP-3; INS-2; CP-2; NEA-1; FWAA)
- Don Bosseler, Miami (AP-1; INS-2; CP-2; NEA-3)
- Billy Ray Barnes, Wake Forest (AP-2; FWAA)
- John David Crow, Texas A&M (AP-2; SN; INS-2; NEA-3)
- Clendon Thomas, Oklahoma (UP-2; INS-2; CP-3)
- Ken Ploen, Iowa (AP-2)
- Jim Swink, TCU (AP-3; UP-2; INS-2)
- Paige Cothren, Mississippi (UP-2)
- Mel Dillard, Purdue (AP-3)
- Jon Arnett, Southern California (UP-3; INS-2; NEA-2)
- Bob McKeiver, Northwestern (CP-3)
- John Bayuk, Colorado (INS-2; CP-3)
- Joel Wells, Clemson (NEA-3)
- Paul Rotenberry, Georgia Tech (INS-2)
- Dennis McGill, Yale (INS-2)
- Earnel Durden, Oregon State (INS-2)

== Key ==
- **Bold** – Consensus All-American
- -1 – First-team selection
- -2 – Second-team selection
- -3 – Third-team selection

=== Official selectors ===
- AFCA = American Football Coaches Association; selected by the votes of the 503 members of the AFCA and published in Collier's Weekly magazine,
- AP = Associated Press
- FWAA = Football Writers Association of America
- INS = International News Service
- NEA = Newspaper Enterprise Association
- SN = The Sporting News
- UP = United Press

=== Other selectors ===
- CP = Central Press Association, selected by college football team captains
- WC = Walter Camp Football Foundation

== See also ==
- 1956 All-Atlantic Coast Conference football team
- 1956 All-Big Seven Conference football team
- 1956 All-Big Ten Conference football team
- 1956 All-Pacific Coast Conference football team
- 1956 All-SEC football team
- 1956 All-Skyline Conference football team
- 1956 All-Southwest Conference football team
