= Pat Bisceglia =

American football player (1930–2009)

Profile
- Positions: Guard, Linebacker

Personal information
- Born: June 23, 1930; Massachusetts, U.S.
- Died: February 7, 2009 (aged 78); Shrewsbury, Massachusetts, U.S.

Career information
- High school: Commerce
- College: Notre Dame
- NFL draft: 1956: undrafted

Career history
- Montreal Alouettes (1956–1957)

Awards and highlights
- First-team All-American (1955)

Pasquale "Pat" Bisceglia (June 23, 1930 – February 7, 2009) was an American football player. He was a first-team All-American guard at Notre Dame in 1955.

Bisceglia grew up in Worcester, Massachusetts, before enrolling at the University of Notre Dame. He played college football at the guard and linebacker positions for the Notre Dame Fighting Irish football team from 1953 to 1955 under head coaches Frank Leahy and Terry Brennan. Bisceglia was selected by the Associated Press as a first-team guard on its 1955 College Football All-America Team.

After graduating from Notre Dame in 1956, Bisceglia played two seasons of professional football for the Montreal Alouettes. He later worked for approximately 35 years for the Massachusetts Department of Environmental Management, Division Forests and Parks. He retired in 1992 and died in 2009 in Shrewsbury, Massachusetts.
