= Phil King (American football) =

American football player (1936–1973)

No. 24, 46
- Positions: Halfback, fullback

Personal information
- Born: June 22, 1936; Nashville, Tennessee, U.S.
- Died: January 18, 1973 (aged 36); Memphis, Tennessee, U.S.
- Listed height: 6 ft 4 in (1.93 m)
- Listed weight: 223 lb (101 kg)

Career information
- College: Vanderbilt (1954–1957)
- NFL draft: 1958: 1st round, 12th overall pick

Career history
- New York Giants (1958–1963); Pittsburgh Steelers (1964); Minnesota Vikings (1965–1966)

Awards and highlights
- First-team All-SEC (1956); Second-team All-SEC (1957)

Career NFL statistics
- Rushing yards: 2,192
- Rushing average: 3.9
- Receptions: 86
- Receiving yards: 951
- Total touchdowns: 16
- Stats at Pro Football Reference

Philip Edgar King (June 22, 1936 – January 18, 1973) was an American professional football running back in the National Football League (NFL) for the New York Giants, Pittsburgh Steelers, and the Minnesota Vikings. He played college football at Vanderbilt University (1955–57) and was drafted in the first round (twelfth overall) of the 1958 NFL draft. He was nicknamed "the Chief" due to his Native American heritage.

== College ==
Phil King was a starting running back at Vanderbilt. He was one of the top SEC conference backs and played in five NFL championship games in six seasons with the New York Giants. He was (All-State), basketball and baseball at Dyersburg (TN) High School. At Vanderbilt King played for Coach Art Guepe, missed his entire freshman season due to a back injury, in 1955 his sophomores year he gained 628 rushing yards (6.4 yards per carry). He was named Third Team All-SEC and All-South by International News Service.

In the 1955 season the Commodores played in the Gator Bowl (27–13 win over Auburn), Vanderbilt football's first-ever postseason game. King scored a touchdown but a penalty on the play wiped it out. King also played defensive back. A Vanderbilt press release wrote about King, "In the broken field King flashes his quick, elusive speed of the deer, but at the line of scrimmage he uses the crunching power of the buffalo. On defense he cuts down a runner with the sudden slash of a bear, or leaps to snare a pass out of the air with the keenness of the eagle."

Known to his teammates as "Chief" because of his Cherokee Indian ancestry, King was described as an "unusually versatile runner with both power and speed; he is a rugged tackler and a dangerous threat on pass defense; he is a capable passer and a great receiver; he is a powerful punter, a tremendous kick-off man, and a cool kicker on vital extra points."

In King's junior year, he was voted All-SEC (First Team) honors he led the Commodores in rushing (651 yards), with punt returns (247 yards), kickoff returns (137 yards) and scoring (47 points). King was 5-of-7 on PAT's while scoring seven touchdowns. A Vanderbilt press release dated November 15, 1956 reported on King's toughness and determination during the 1956 season: "King was invited to play in the Blue-Gray Classic and the Senior Bowl and named an Academic All-American. Playing in an era of dominating defenses, conservative offenses and fewer games, King's 1,717 career-rushing yards would rank him as one of the top Commodores' running backs in history."

== NFL ==
King was selected in the first round of the 1958 NFL Draft with the 12th overall pick by the New York Giants. In the 1958 season, King was selected as the NFL Rookie of the Year while rushing for 316 yards (83 attempts), 134 yards receiving (11 receptions) and one rushing touchdown. King was a back-up to Frank Gifford. While with the Giants the team made it to the NFL Championship game with the Baltimore Colts. Considered "The Greatest Game Played" the Colts defeated the Giants 23–17 in sudden death overtime. He also played in the NFL Championship games with the Giants in 1959 (Colts 31 Giants 16), 1961 (Packers 37 Giants 0), 1962 (Packers 16 Giants 7) and 1963 (Bears 14 Giants 10). In the 1963 NFL championship game, King played against former Vanderbilt quarterback Bill Wade who scored the Bears only two touchdowns in the Chicago victory. King finished his NFL career with Pittsburgh (1964) and Minnesota (1965–66). His NFL career totals include 103 games, 2,192 yards (569 carries, 3.9 avg.), 16 touchdowns (seven rushing) with his longest run from scrimmage 50 yards. King was inducted into the Tennessee Sports Hall of Fame in 1976.

== Death ==
January 20, 1973, Page 22 The New York Times wrote: "Phil King, a running back for the New York Giants during their glory years from 1958 through 1963 when the team won five Eastern Division titles in the National Football League, died in Memphis Thursday (January 18, 1973) of what was reported as an accidental gunshot wound in the head. The police said the 36‐year‐old King, a salesman from Nashville, died when a .38‐caliber pistol discharged while he was handling it. He was rushed to a hospital after being found in a Memphis motel room. He had been shot above the right ear. King worked for a company in New Jersey, but living in Nashville at the time of his death. King is buried at Woodlawn Memorial Park and Mausoleum in Nashville Tennessee.

The Tennessean sports writer John Bibb wrote at the time of King's death:

"I'll leave the stories of Phil King's football accomplishments to the record books and the newspaper files. They are in abundance, detailing a career of successes from high school and college right on through the professional game.

"There is another Phil King story you should know. It has nothing to do with the crowded stadiums in which he played. It has nothing to do with the delightful easy-going way he had of making a friend laugh, even at an old story.

"It has nothing to do with the way he put his words together to mesmerize an audience when he explained the virtues of college athletics, 'and what my scholarship meant to me.' It has to do instead with a guy who was never too busy to overlook a chance to help somebody.

"Yesterday Jess Neely [Vandy AD at the time and former Rice head football coach], one of King's favorites and a man who had tried to recruit Phil for Rice University back in 1953 was talking about the tragedy in Memphis. 'You know, I can't help but to remember Phil and the recent Sunday where we were getting all that snow,' said Coach Neely. 'Dorothy (Mrs. Neely) had put some food out for the birds in our back yard. She glanced out the window and noticed a big dog coming through the yard.

"'She was sure the dog was going to get the bird food, so she asked me to chase him away. I went outside, and there was Phil and a couple of youngsters. They had climbed the hill to our home.

"'Coach,' he said, 'I know it's going to be tough for you and Mrs. Neely to get out of here if the snow keeps falling. We're walking to the store and stopped to see if you needed anything we might bring back.'"

Phil King was widely respected by his teammates and peers, who remembered him as someone willing to help others regardless of the challenge. His standing among Vanderbilt athletes was reflected by the number of former teammates who traveled from across the county to attend his funeral in Nashville, including Joe Stephenson, a senior end on Vanderbilt's Gator Bowl team alongside King.

"'Looking back, Phil, although just a sophomore, was really one of us from the start,' said Stephenson. 'He didn't gain as much yardage his junior year as he did as a sophomore. All of the Gator Bowl line, except Art Demmas had graduated.

"'When we would ask him how things were going the next year (1956), Phil would laugh and say, 'the holes are a little smaller than usual, but The Chief can get through.'"
