= J. T. Frankenberger =

American gridiron football player (1935–2019)

Profile
- Position: Tackle

Personal information
- Born: March 6, 1935; Louisville, Kentucky, U.S.
- Died: January 18, 2019 (aged 83); Vero Beach, Florida, U.S.
- Listed height: 6 ft 5 in (1.96 m)
- Listed weight: 235 lb (107 kg)

Career information
- College: Kentucky

Career history
- 1958–1959: Edmonton Eskimos
- 1960: Saskatchewan Roughriders

Awards and highlights
- Second-team All-SEC (1956)

Jerome Tomas Frankenberger (March 6, 1935 – January 18, 2019) was an American professional football player who played for the Edmonton Eskimos and Saskatchewan Roughriders. He played college football at the University of Kentucky.
