= Charley Horton (halfback) =

American football player

No. 24
- Position: Halfback

Personal information
- Born: 1935 (age 90–91); St. Petersburg, Florida, U.S.
- Listed height: 6 ft 0 in (1.83 m)
- Listed weight: 195 lb (88 kg)

Career information
- High school: St. Petersburg (Florida)
- College: Vanderbilt
- NFL draft: 1956: 1st round, 11th overall pick

Career history
- 1958: Montreal Alouettes

Awards and highlights
- Third-team All-American (1955); First-team All-SEC (1955)

Charles Horton (born 1935) is an American former professional football halfback who played one season with the Montreal Alouettes of the Canadian Football League (CFL). He was selected by the Los Angeles Rams of the National Football League (NFL) with the eleventh overall pick of the 1956 NFL draft. He played college football at Vanderbilt University.

== Early life ==
Horton played high school football at St. Petersburg High School in St. Petersburg, Florida. He was named honorable mention All-State and played in the Florida All-Star high school football game. He also participated in track and field and was a Florida high hurdle state champion. He was inducted into the St. Petersburg High School Athletic Hall of fame in 1999.

== College career ==
Horton played for the Vanderbilt Commodores football team from 1952 to 1955. Horton was named a third team All-American by the International News Service in 1955. He was named first team All-SEC his senior year and second team All-SEC his junior year. He was the MVP of the 1955 Gator Bowl, rushing for 57 yards on 13 carries and one touchdown in Vanderbilt's 25–13 win over the Auburn Tigers. Horton scored a then-Vanderbilt record of twelve touchdowns in 1955. He played in the Chicago College All-Star Game. He also participated in track and field for the Commodores.

== Professional career ==
Horton was selected by the Washington Redskins in the 15th round, with the 172nd overall pick, of the 1955 NFL draft. The next year, he was selected by the Los Angeles Rams in the first round, with the 11th overall pick, of the 1956 NFL draft. He was instead required to serve two years in the United States Navy after joining the NROTC at Vanderbilt. While in the Navy he played football at Naval Amphibious Base Little Creek, being named the Most Valuable All-Service player in 1957. He was also named first team All-Sea Service in 1956 and 1957.

Horton appeared in five games for the Montreal Alouettes of the CFL in 1958.

== Officiating career ==
Horton officiated college football games after his playing days. He was an official in 17 bowl games, including the 1986 Orange Bowl, 1987 Fiesta Bowl and 1992 Rose Bowl.

== See also ==
- SEC Football Legends
