= 1957 All-SEC football team =

American college football all-star team

The 1957 All-SEC football team consists of American football players selected to the All-Southeastern Conference (SEC) chosen by various selectors for the 1957 college football season. Auburn won the conference.

== All-SEC selections ==
=== Ends ===
- Jimmy Phillips, Auburn (AP-1, UP-1)
- Jerry Wilson, Auburn (AP-1, UP-1)
- Bob Laws, Vanderbilt (AP-2, UP-3)
- Jerry Nabers, Georgia Tech (AP-2, UP-2)
- Dan Pelham, Florida (UP-2)
- Don Fleming, Florida (AP-3)
- Jack Benge, Miss. St.(AP-3)
- Don Williams, Ole Miss (UP-3)

=== Tackles ===
- Lou Michaels, Kentucky (College Football Hall of Fame) (AP-1, UP-1)
- Gene Hickerson, Ole Miss (AP-1, UP-1)
- Charlie Mitchell, Florida (AP-2, UP-2)
- Ben Preston, Auburn (AP-2, UP-2)
- Ned Dye, Georgia (AP-2)
- Sam Latham, Miss. St. (AP-2)
- Al Aucoin, LSU (UP-3)
- Jim Smelcher, Tennessee (UP-3)

=== Guards ===
- Bill Johnson, Tennessee (AP-1, UP-1)
- Jackie Simpson, Ole Miss (AP-1, UP-2)
- George Deiderich, Vanderbilt (AP-2, UP-1)
- Billy Rains, Alabama (AP-2, UP-2)
- Zeke Smith, Auburn (AP-3, UP-3)
- Cicero Lucas, Georgia (AP-3)
- Tim Baker, Auburn (UP-3)

=== Centers ===
- Don Stephenson, Georgia Tech (AP-1, UP-1)
- Jackie Burkett, Auburn (AP-2, UP-2)
- Jack Benson, Miss. St. (AP-3, UP-2 [as G])
- Jimmy Dodd, Miss. St. (UP-3)

=== Backs ===
- Billy Stacy, Miss. St. (AP-1, UP-1)
- Bobby Gordon, Tennessee (AP-1, UP-1)
- Jimmy Taylor, LSU (AP-1, UP-1)
- Jimmy Rountree, Florida (AP-1, UP-2)
- Ray Brown, Ole Miss (AP-2, UP-1)
- Phil King, Vanderbilt (AP-2, UP-2)
- Bill Atkins, Auburn (AP-2, UP-2)
- Bobby Crevens, Kentucky (AP-2, UP-3)
- Billy Cannon, LSU (College Football Hall of Fame) (UP-2)
- Royce Smith, Vanderbilt (AP-3, UP-3)
- Tommy Lorton, Auburn (AP-3, UP-3)
- Billy Lott, Ole Miss (AP-3)
- Theron Sapp, Georgia (AP-3)
- Tommy Bronson, Tennessee (UP-3)

== Key ==
AP = Associated Press.

UP = United Press Bold = Consensus first-team selection by both AP and UP

== See also ==
- 1957 College Football All-America Team
