= Joe Childress =

American football player (1933–1986)

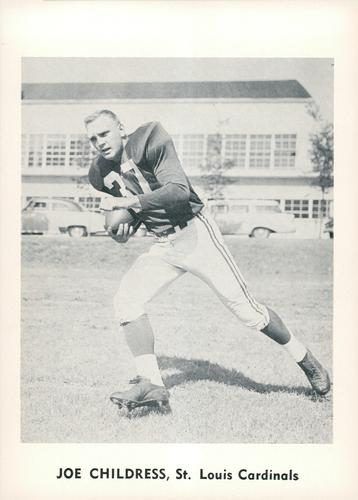
- Childress in 1961

No. 35
- Positions: Halfback, fullback, flanker

Personal information
- Born: October 26, 1933; Robertsdale, Alabama, U.S.
- Died: May 5, 1986 (aged 52); Houston, Texas, U.S.
- Listed height: 6 ft 0 in (1.83 m)
- Listed weight: 202 lb (92 kg)

Career information
- High school: Robertsdale
- College: Auburn (1952–1955)
- NFL draft: 1956: 1st round, 7th overall pick

Career history

Playing
- Chicago / St. Louis Cardinals (1956–1965)

Coaching
- Houston Oilers (1966-1970) Offensive backs

Awards and highlights
- First-team All-American (1955); 2× First-team All-SEC (1954, 1955); Gator Bowl MVP (1954)

Career NFL statistics
- Rushing yards: 2,210
- Rushing average: 4.2
- Receptions: 121
- Receiving yards: 1,700
- Total touchdowns: 16
- Stats at Pro Football Reference

Joe Childress (October 26, 1933 – May 5, 1986) was an American professional football running back in the National Football League (NFL). He played college football for the Auburn Tigers.

== College career ==
Childress was a two-time All-American at Auburn and was considered the finest fullback in the country during his junior and senior seasons. He led the Southeastern Conference in rushing and scoring his junior season in 1954 and was named the Gator Bowl MVP. Childress led Auburn with 1,677 yards rushing his senior season in 1955.

== Professional career ==
Childress was selected seventh overall in the first round of the 1956 NFL draft by the Chicago Cardinals. For his entire career, he played for the Chicago Cardinals and St. Louis Cardinals, primarily as a backup running back. He was known as an excellent receiver out of the backfield and a punishing blocker. His best season came in 1963 when he led the Cardinals in rushing and gained over 1000 yards from scrimmage while filling in for the injured John David Crow. His best rushing game came on September 22, 1963, when he gained 136 yards on 22 carries against the Philadelphia Eagles. Later in the season against the Eagles, he caught a 78-yard touchdown pass from Charley Johnson.

== NFL career statistics ==
Legend
**Bold**	Career high

Year	Team	Games		Rushing					Receiving				
Year	Team	GP	GS	Att	Yds	Avg	Lng	TD	Rec	Yds	Avg	Lng	TD
1956	CRD	11	4	43	203	4.7	30	0	6	82	13.7	34	1
1957	CRD	12	1	41	168	4.1	**39**	1	10	146	14.6	28	0
1958	CRD	10	8	50	170	3.4	30	0	**35**	**406**	11.6	26	**4**
1959	CRD	9	3	30	59	2.0	9	0	4	73	18.3	52	1
1960	STL	12	8	34	240	**7.1**	28	0	11	202	**18.4**	52	2
1962	STL	14	2	37	162	4.4	15	0	15	207	13.8	42	1
1963	STL	14	14	**174**	**701**	4.0	28	**2**	25	354	14.2	**78**	2
1964	STL	9	7	102	413	4.0	17	0	12	203	16.9	46	2
1965	STL	5	2	19	94	4.9	13	0	3	27	9.0	10	0
		96	49	530	2,210	4.2	39	3	121	1,700	14.0	78	13

== Retirement ==
Childress retired as a player from the NFL in 1966. He coached five seasons with the Houston Oilers and later went into the securities business. In his 40s, he contracted a type of cancer and began the battle which ultimately he lost in 1986 at the age of 52.
