= Don Stephenson (Canadian football) =

American gridiron football player (1935–1985)

Profile
- Positions: Center, Guard, End

Personal information
- Born: July 10, 1935
- Died: November 25, 1985 (aged 50)
- Listed height: 6 ft 0 in (1.83 m)
- Listed weight: 205 lb (93 kg)

Career information
- College: Georgia Tech

Career history
- 1958–1963: Edmonton Eskimos
- 1963–1965: Calgary Stampeders

Awards and highlights
- 2× First-team All-American (1956, 1957); 2× First-team All-SEC (1956, 1957)

Donald Priestly Stephenson (July 10, 1935 – November 25, 1985) is an American former football player who played for the Edmonton Eskimos and Calgary Stampeders. He played college football at Georgia Tech.
