= Ronnie Quillian =

American gridiron football player (1934–2016)

Profile
- Positions: Halfback, Punter

Personal information
- Born: November 27, 1934; Troy, Alabama, U.S.
- Died: January 9, 2016 (aged 81); Kelowna, British Columbia, Canada
- Listed height: 5 ft 10 in (1.78 m)
- Listed weight: 180 lb (82 kg)

Career information
- High school: Baton Rouge (LA)
- College: Tulane (1953–1956)

Career history
- 1957–1958: Ottawa Rough Riders

Awards and highlights
- Second-team All-SEC (1956)

Ronald Gene Quillian (November 27, 1934 – January 9, 2016) was a Canadian football player who played for the Ottawa Rough Riders. He played college football at Tulane University.
