= John Witte =

American gridiron football player (1933–1993)

No. 65
- Position: Tackle

Personal information
- Born: January 29, 1933
- Died: March 17, 1993 (aged 60); Portland, Oregon, U.S.
- Listed height: 6 ft 3 in (1.91 m)
- Listed weight: 235 lb (107 kg)

Career information
- High school: Klamath Union (Klamath Falls, Oregon)
- College: Oregon State
- NFL draft: 1955: 9th round, 103rd overall pick

Career history
- 1957: Saskatchewan Roughriders

Awards and highlights
- Consensus All-American (1956); First-team All-American (1955); 2× First-team All-PCC (1955, 1956)

Medal record

Collegiate wrestling

Representing the Oregon State Beavers

NCAA Championships
| Silver medal – second place | 1952 Fort Collins | Heavyweight |

John August Witte (January 29, 1933 – March 17, 1993) was an American professional football tackle who played one season with the Saskatchewan Roughriders of the Western Interprovincial Football Union (WIFU). He was selected by the Los Angeles Rams in the ninth round of the 1955 NFL draft.

== Early life ==
Witte played college football at Oregon State University and attended Klamath Union High School in Klamath Falls, Oregon. He was a consensus All-American in 1956. Witte was also a wrestler at Oregon State and finished second at the NCAA Championships as a freshman. He served in the United States Army during the Korean War and became a corporal.

== Professional career ==
Witte was selected by the Los Angeles Rams in the ninth round, with the 103rd overall pick, of the 1955 NFL draft. He played in 13 games for the Saskatchewan Roughriders of the Western Interprovincial Football Union in 1957.

== After football ==
After his football career, Witte had a brief career as a professional wrestler before moving into a career in education. He taught high school and coached football, including 24 years at Jefferson High School, where he served 17 years as dean of students. He died of leukemia in Portland in 1993. He was inducted to the Oregon Sports Hall of Fame in 1983 and the Oregon State Athletics Hall of Fame in 1991.

== See also ==
- List of gridiron football players who became professional wrestlers
