= 1956 All-SEC football team =

American college football all-star team

The 1956 All-SEC football team consists of American football players selected to the All-Southeastern Conference (SEC) chosen by various selectors for the 1956 college football season. Tennessee won the conference.

== All-SEC selections ==
=== Ends ===
- Buddy Cruze, Tennessee (AP-1, UP-1)
- Ron Bennett, Miss. St. (AP-1, UP-1)
- Jimmy Phillips, Auburn (AP-2, UP-2)
- Roger Urbano, Tennessee (AP-3, UP-2)
- Jerry Nabors, Georgia Tech (AP-2)
- John Wood, LSU (AP-3)
- Roy Wilkins, Georgia (UP-3)
- Bob Laws, Vanderbilt (UP-3)

=== Tackles ===
- Lou Michaels, Kentucky (College Football Hall of Fame) (AP-1, UP-1)
- Billy Yelverton, Ole Miss (AP-1, UP-2)
- Carl Vereen, Georgia Tech (AP-3, UP-2)
- J. T. Frankenberger, Kentucky (AP-2, UP-3)
- Dalton Truax, Tulane (AP-2)
- Art Demmas, Vanderbilt (AP-3)
- Earl Leggett, LSU (UP-3)

=== Guards ===
- John Gordy, Tennessee (AP-1, UP-1 [as T])
- John Barrow, Florida (AP-1, UP-1)
- Allen Ecker, Georgia Tech (AP-2, UP-1)
- Ernest Danjean, Auburn (AP-3, UP-2)
- Paul Ziegler, LSU (AP-2)
- Jimmy Johnson, Georgia Tech (UP-2)
- Charles Duck, Ole Miss (AP-3, UP-3)
- Tony Cushenberry, Georgia (UP-3)

=== Centers ===
- Don Stephenson, Georgia Tech (AP-1, UP-1)
- Dave Kuhn, Kentucky (AP-2, UP-3)
- Bobby Howe, Tennessee (UP-2)
- Jerry Stone, Ole Miss (AP-3)

=== Quarterbacks ===
- Billy Stacy, Miss. St. (AP-1, UP-1)
- Gene Newton, Tulane (AP-2, UP-2)
- Ron Vann, Georgia Tech (AP-3)
- Wade Mitchell, Georgia Tech (UP-3)

=== Halfbacks ===
- Johnny Majors, Tennessee (College Football Hall of Fame) (AP-1, UP-1)
- Phil King, Vanderbilt (AP-3, UP-1)
- Paul Rotenberry, Georgia Tech (AP-2, UP-2)
- Tommy Lorino, Auburn (AP-2, UP-3)
- Jackie Simpson, Florida (UP-2)
- Jim Rountree, Florida (AP-3)
- George Volkert, Georgia Tech (UP-3)

=== Fullbacks ===
- Paige Cothren, Ole Miss (AP-1, UP-1)
- Ken Owen, Georgia Tech (AP-1, UP-3)
- Ronnie Quillian, Tulane (AP-2, UP-2)
- Bob Dougherty, Kentucky (AP-3)

== Key ==
AP = Associated Press

UP = United Press

Bold = Consensus first-team selection by both AP and UP

== See also ==
- 1956 College Football All-America Team
