= Klamath Union High School =

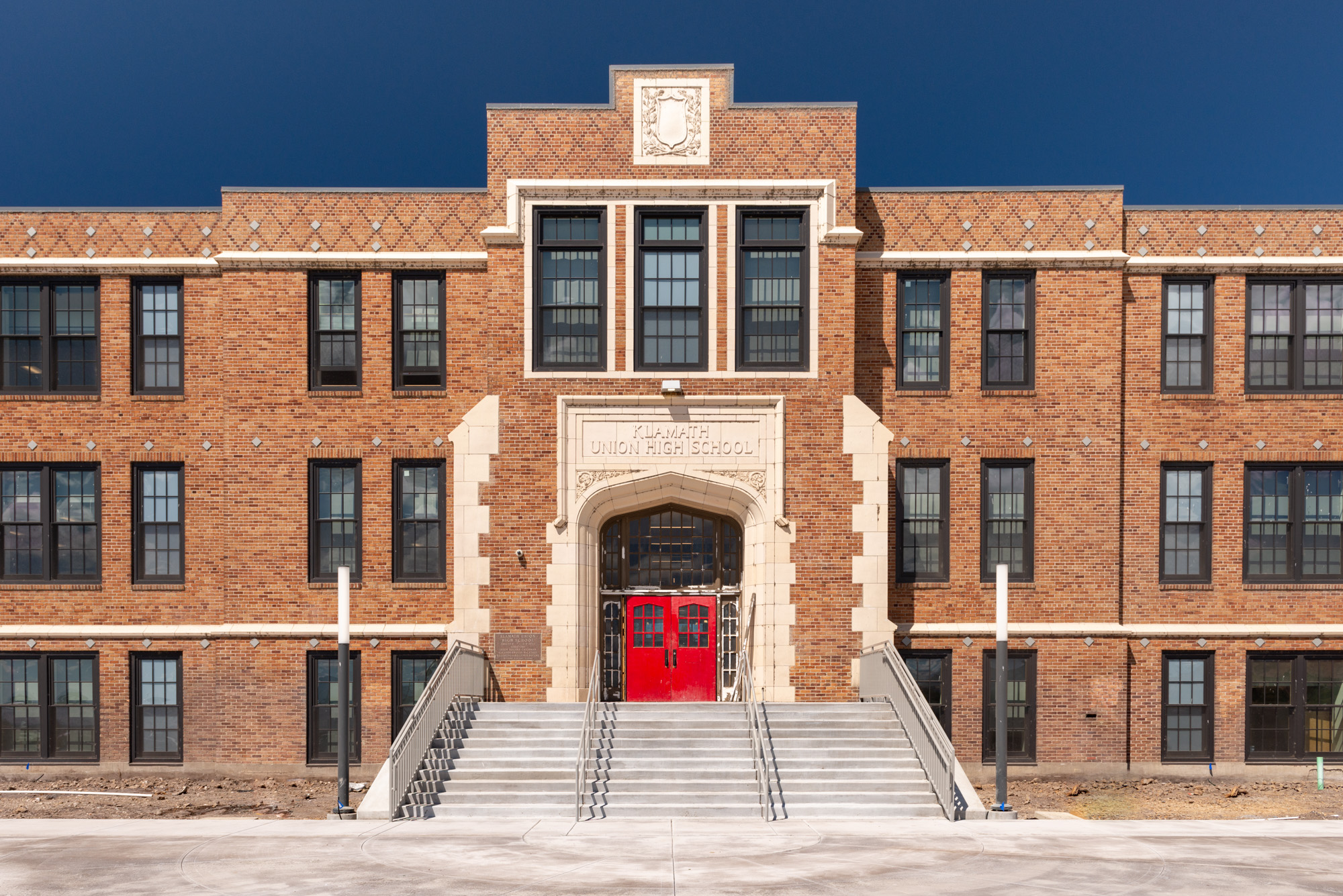

Location
- 1300 Monclaire Street; Klamath Falls, Oregon 97601; United States; 42.2305°N 121.7788°W

Information
- Type: Public
- Opened: 1901
- School district: Klamath Falls City School District
- Principal: Rod Heyen
- Teaching staff: 28.00 (FTE)
- Grades: 9–12
- Enrollment: 660 (2023–2024)
- Student to teacher ratio: 23.57
- Colors: Red and white
- Athletics conference: OSAA Skyline 4A
- Mascot: Pelican
- Team name: Pelicans
- Rival: Mazama High School
- Website: Klamath Union High School

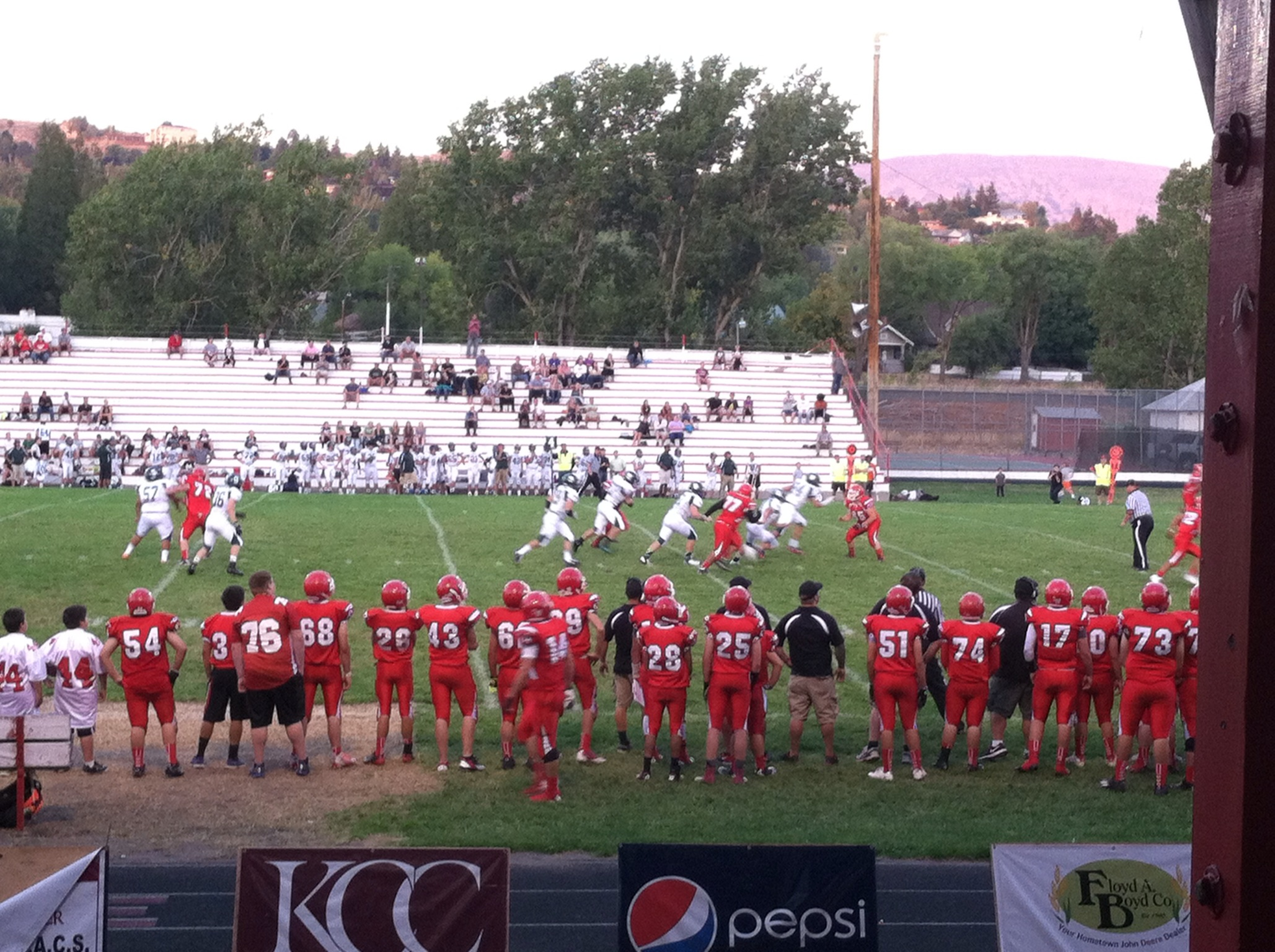
KU 2013 football team in action

Klamath Union High School is a public high school located in Klamath Falls, Oregon, United States.

== History ==
Funding of the school began in 1901, with the first graduate in 1903. The construction of the school began in 1927, with the first marching band the following year. KUHS opened with 520 students and had 77 graduates in its first year. Paul Jackson was the principal and, in 1958, Pelican Pete was chosen as the school's mascot.

The school colors are red and white, and a large "K" is marked in white stone on a nearby hill.

== Academics ==
In 2008, 89% of the school's seniors received a high school diploma. Of 186 students, 166 graduated, 14 dropped out, three received a modified diploma, and three were still in high school in 2009.

== Band ==
Every other year the Klamath Union Marching Band takes a trip to Victoria, British Columbia, to march in the Victoria Day parade. In past years the band has won several awards through the competition. For several years in a row, the Symphonic Band has been district champions and qualified for state, once winning first place in the state competition. In 2013 the band took fourth in state, and in 2014 they moved up to third.

== Notable alumni ==
- Seth Brown – Major League Baseball player
- Don Pedro Colley – actor
- Ian Dobson – track and field athlete, competed at the 2008 Olympics
- James Ivory – film director, Merchant Ivory Productions
- Paul Minner – Major League Baseball pitcher
- Bob Moore – football player
- Randy Whisler – baseball player
- John Witte – football player
