= 1955 All-Pacific Coast football team =

American all-star college football team

The 1955 All-Pacific Coast football team consists of American football players chosen by the Associated Press (AP) and the United Press (UP) as the best college football players by position in the Pacific Coast region during the 1955 college football season. The AP team was limited to players form the Pacific Coast Conference (PCC) and was based on votes of football writers of more than 20 AP member newspapers on the west coast. The UP team included players from non-PCC schools.

The 1955 UCLA Bruins football team won the PCC championship and was ranked No. 4 in the final AP Poll. Six UCLA players were selected by either the AP or UP on the first team: backs Sam Brown and Bob Davenport; end Rommie Loudd; guards Hardiman Cureton and Jim Brown; and center Steve Palmer. Cureton was the only PCC player to be selected as a consensus first-team player on the 1955 All-America college football team.

== Selections ==
=== Backs ===
- Jon Arnett, USC (AP-1; UP-1)
- Sam Brown, UCLA (AP-1; UP-1)
- Bob Davenport, UCLA (AP-1; UP-1)
- John Brodie, Stanford (AP-1; UP-2)
- Bill Tarr, Stanford (AP-2; UP-1)
- Dick James, Oregon (AP-2; UP-2)
- Joe Francis, Oregon State (AP-2; UP-3)
- Ronnie Knox, UCLA (AP-2)
- Art Luppino, Arizona (UP-2)
- Credell Green, Washington (UP-2)
- Ken Swearingen, Pacific (UP-3)
- Teresa, San Jose State (UP-3)
- Jim Shanley, Oregon (UP-3)

=== Ends ===
- Rommie Loudd, UCLA (AP-1; UP-1)
- John Stewart, Stanford (AP-1; UP-2)
- A. D. Williams, Pacific (UP-1)
- Jim Houston, Washington (AP-2; UP-2)
- Jim Carmichael, California (AP-2; UP-3)
- Art Powell, San Jose State (UP-3)

=== Tackles ===
- John Witte, Oregon State (AP-1; UP-1)
- Paul Wiggin, Stanford (AP-1; UP-2)
- Fred Robinson, Washington (AP-2; UP-1)
- Gil Moreno, UCLA (AP-2; UP-3)
- John Nisby, Pacific (UP-2)
- John Jankins, Arizona State (UP-3)

=== Guards ===
- Orlando Ferrante, USC (AP-1; UP-1)
- Jim Brown, UCLA (AP-1; UP-2)
- Hardiman Cureton, UCLA (AP-2; UP-1)
- Earl Monlux, Washington (AP-2; UP-3)
- Tony Mosich, Stanford (UP-2)
- Vaughan Hitchcock, Washington State (UP-3)

=== Centers ===
- Steve Palmer, UCLA (AP-1; UP-1)
- Joe Long, Stanford (AP-2; UP-2)
- Bert Watson, Washington (UP-3)

== Key ==
AP = Associated Press, "selected by a vote of more than a score of football writers from AP member newspapers up and down the West Coast"

UP = United Press

== See also ==
- 1955 College Football All-America Team
