= Scott Suber =

American football player (1934–2015)

Profile
- Position: Guard

Personal information
- Born: September 26, 1934; Calhoun County, Mississippi, U.S.
- Died: March 31, 2015 (aged 80); Calhoun County, Mississippi, U.S.

Career information
- College: Mississippi State

Awards and highlights
- First-team All-American (1955); First-team All-SEC (1955)

Billie Scott Suber (September 26, 1934 – March 31, 2015) was an American football player. Suber was born and raised in Calhoun County, Mississippi (first in Derma and then in Calhoun City), where his father worked in a saw mill. He attended Mississippi State University and played college football at the guard position for the Mississippi State Bulldogs football team under head coach Darrell Royal. Suber was selected by the Newspaper Enterprise Association as a first-team player on its 1955 College Football All-America Team. After leaving Mississippi State, he served in the military and later had a career with what became Renesant Bank in Tupelo, Mississippi. He was inducted into the Mississippi Sports Hall of Fame in 1993. Suber died in Calhoun City on March 31, 2015, at the age of 80.
