= John Nisby =

American football player (1936–2011)

No. 65, 62
- Position: Guard

Personal information
- Born: September 9, 1936; San Francisco, California, U.S.
- Died: February 6, 2011 (aged 74); Stockton, California, U.S.
- Listed height: 6 ft 1 in (1.85 m)
- Listed weight: 235 lb (107 kg)

Career information
- High school: Stockton
- College: Pacific (1954–1956)
- NFL draft: 1957: 6th round, 70th overall pick

Career history
- Pittsburgh Steelers (1957–1961); Washington Redskins (1962–1964)

Awards and highlights
- 3× Pro Bowl (1959, 1961-1962); 2× Second-team All-PCC (1955, 1956)

Career NFL statistics
- Games played: 102
- Games started: 99
- Fumble recoveries: 4
- Stats at Pro Football Reference

John Edward Nisby (September 9, 1936 – February 6, 2011) was an American professional football player who was a guard in the National Football League (NFL). He played college football for the Pacific Tigers. Nisby played in the NFL for the Pittsburgh Steelers and Washington Redskins, and was one of the first African American players to play for Washington.

== Early life ==
Nisby was born in San Francisco, California, and attended Edison High School in Stockton, California. He played college football at San Joaquin Delta College and at the University of the Pacific. He earned his master's degree from the University of Oregon.

== Professional career ==
Nisby was selected in the sixth round (70th pick overall) of the 1957 NFL draft by the Green Bay Packers. He played for eight seasons in the NFL, and was named to the Pro Bowl in 1959, 1961, and 1962. While playing for the Steelers, Nisby worked with the Pittsburgh Courier to work for equal employment policies in companies that did business with the Steelers.

In 1962, Nisby became one of the first African American players (along with Bobby Mitchell and Leroy Jackson) to play for the Washington Redskins, the last team in the NFL to integrate. That year, Nisby and Mitchell became the first black Washington Redskins players to be named to the Pro Bowl.

== Life after the NFL ==
When the Redskins released Nisby in 1964, he retired from football and became Director of the "College Readiness Program" at San Joaquin Delta College. He was also a City Councilman in Stockton, California. In 1987, Nisby was made a member of the Stockton Black Sports Hall of Fame.

Nisby died on February 6, 2011, in Stockton.
