= Buddy Cruze =

American football player (1933–2018)

No. 86
- Position: End

Personal information
- Born: May 24, 1933; Knoxville, Tennessee, U.S.
- Died: March 10, 2018 (aged 84); Knoxville, Tennessee, U.S.
- Listed height: 6 ft 4 in (1.93 m)

Career information
- High school: Knoxville (TN) Austin-East
- College: Tennessee
- NFL draft: 1956: 12th round, 143rd overall pick

Career history
- Chicago Bears (1957); Baltimore Colts (1958); Montreal Alouettes (1959)

Awards and highlights
- First-team All-American (1956); First-team All-SEC (1956)

Kyle Layman "Buddy" Cruze (May 24, 1933 – March 10, 2018) was an American football player at the University of Tennessee. A native of Knoxville, Tennessee, Cruze attended Knoxville High School and East High School. He attended Southern Methodist University and thereafter transferred to the University of Tennessee. He played college football at the end position in 1952 for the SMU Mustangs and from 1954 to 1956 for the Tennessee Volunteers. He was selected by the Football Writers Association of America as a first-team player on its 1956 College Football All-America Team. After leaving the University of Tennessee he was drafted 143rd overall by the Chicago Bears in the 1956 NFL draft. He later signed with the Montreal Alouettes in 1959. He was inducted into the Tennessee Sports Hall of Fame in 2007. He died on March 10, 2018, at the age of 84.
