= Orlando Ferrante =

American former football player and theme park engineer

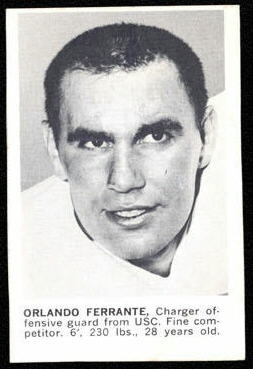

No. 68
- Position: Guard

Personal information
- Born: September 24, 1932 (age 94); Los Angeles, California, U.S.
- Listed height: 6 ft 0 in (1.83 m)
- Listed weight: 230 lb (104 kg)

Career information
- High school: Mount Carmel (Los Angeles)
- College: USC

Career history
- Los Angeles/San Diego Chargers (1960–1961)

Awards and highlights
- Second-team All-American (1955); First-team All-PCC (1955)
- Stats at Pro Football Reference

Charles Orlando Ferrante (born September 24, 1932) is an American former professional football player and Disney Imagineer. He played college football for the USC Trojans and served two years in the U.S. Navy before playing two seasons with the Los Angeles Chargers.

In 1962 he joined Walt Disney Imagineering, where he worked on the 1964 New York World's Fair, contributed to the design of Disneyland Paris, and helped launch the second Disney Cruise Line in Venice, eventually becoming the company's vice president of engineering, design and production. In 2002 he retired after 40 years with Disney.

On November 28, 1959, he married Lucille Melkesian (b. 1936) in Los Angeles, California.
