= Tim Webster (American football) =

American football player (1949–2021)

No. 38
- Position: Placekicker

Personal information
- Born: September 11, 1949; Henryetta, Oklahoma, U.S.
- Died: June 30, 2021 (aged 71); Conroe, Texas, U.S.
- Listed height: 6 ft 0 in (1.83 m)
- Listed weight: 195 lb (88 kg)

Career information
- High school: Grove (OK)
- College: Arkansas
- NFL draft: 1971: undrafted

Career history
- Green Bay Packers (1971)

Career NFL statistics
- Field goal attempts: 11
- Field goals made: 6
- Extra Point attempts: 8
- Extra points made: 8
- Stats at Pro Football Reference

Tim Webster (September 11, 1949 – June 30, 2021) was a placekicker in the National Football League (NFL). He had earned a spot on the Green Bay Packers' taxi squad by his performance in the 1971 the preseason despite having been a backup kicker and kickoff specialist in college. He was activated by the Packers for the last 4 games of the 1971 NFL season, replacing veteran Lou Michaels as the Packers' placekicker. During the 1972 preseason Michaels was waived but Webster had to compete with rookie Chester Marcol, the Packers' 2nd round draft pick, to retain his placekicking job. Marcol won the competition and Webster was waived before the start of the 1972 season.
