= Ken Swearingen =

American football coach

Biographical details
- Born: c. 1934

Playing career
- 1952–1953: El Camino
- 1955: Pacific (CA)

Coaching career (HC unless noted)
- 1957–1961: El Camino (assistant)
- 1962–1975: El Camino
- 1976–1994: Saddleback
- 2004–2005: Desert

Head coaching record
- Overall: 253–76–6
- Bowls: 8–6
- Tournaments: Football; 4–1 (California JC large division playoffs)

Accomplishments and honors

Championships
- Football; 3 junior college national (1968, 1985, 1992); 1 California JC large division (1971); 3 Metropolitan Conference (1968, 1971, 1983); 10 Mission Conference (1977–1985, 1987); 2 Mission Conference Central Division (1991–1992)

Awards
- All-Pacific Coast (1955)

Ken Swearingen (born c. 1934) is an American former college football player and coach. He served as the head football coach at El Camino College in Alondra Park, California from 1962 to 1975, Saddleback College in Mission Viejo, California from 1975 to 1994, and the College of the Desert in Palm Desert, California from 2004 to 2005, compiling a career junior college football head coaching record of 253–76–6. His 253 wins are the most of any junior college football coach. Swearingen led his teams to three national titles, at El Camino in 1968, and Saddleback in 1985 and 1992. His 1971 El Camino team also won the California state large division championship.

Swearingen played football at El Camino in 1952 and 1952 and then at the College of the Pacific—now known as the University of the Pacific—in Stockton, California. He returned to El Camino in 1957 as an assistant coach and succeeded Doug Essick as head coach following the 1961 season.

== Head coaching record ==
=== Junior college football ===
Year	Team	Overall	Conference	Standing	Bowl/playoffs
El Camino Warriors (Metropolitan Conference) (1962–1975)
1962	El Camino	7–2	5–2	3rd	
1963	El Camino	6–3	4–3	4th	
1964	El Camino	6–3	3–3	T–3rd	
1965	El Camino	5–3–1	2–3–1	4th	
1966	El Camino	5–2–2	3–2–2	4th	
1967	El Camino	8–1	6–1	2nd	
1968	El Camino	10–1	7–0	1st	L California JC large division semifinal
1969	El Camino	7–2	5–1	2nd	
1970	El Camino	6–3	4–2	T–2nd	
1971	El Camino	11–1	6–0	1st	W California JC large division championship
1972	El Camino	7–1–1	4–1	2nd	
1973	El Camino	6–3	4–1	T–1st	
1974	El Camino	8–1–1	4–1	2nd	
1975	El Camino	6–4	2–4	T–5th	
El Camino:		98–30–5	59–24–3		
Saddleback Gauchos (Mission Conference) (1976–1994)
1976	Saddleback	6–3	6–1	3rd	
1977	Saddleback	10–1	7–0	1st	W Mission Bowl
1978	Saddleback	9–2	7–0	1st	L Mission Bowl
1979	Saddleback	10–1	6–1	T–1st	W Mission Bowl
1980	Saddleback	9–1	5–1	1st	W Mission Bowl
1981	Saddleback	11–0	6–0	1st	W Pony Bowl
1982	Saddleback	9–2	5–1	T–1st	L Orange County Bowl
1983	Saddleback	9–1–1	5–0–1	T–1st	L Santa Ana Bowl
1984	Saddleback	9–2	8–0	1st	L Pony Bowl
1985	Saddleback	11–0	8–0	1st	W Pony Bowl
1986	Saddleback	5–5	5–4	T–4th	
1987	Saddleback	9–2	8–1	1st	W Pony Bowl
1988	Saddleback	8–3	7–2 / 4–1	2nd (Central)	L Pony Bowl
1989	Saddleback	1–9	1–8	6th (Central)	
1990	Saddleback	6–4	3–2	T–2nd (Central)	
1991	Saddleback	10–1	8–1 / 5–0	1st (Central)	W Orange County Bowl
1992	Saddleback	11–0	9–0 / 5–0	1st (Central)	W Orange County Bowl
1993	Saddleback	5–5		3rd (Central)	
1994	Saddleback	1–7–2	1–3–2	6th (Central)	
Saddleback:		143–37–1			
Desert Roadrunners () (2004–2005)
2004	Desert	6–5	5–3		L U.S. Bank Beach Bowl
2005	Desert	6–4	5–3		
Desert:		12–9	10–6		
Total:		253–76–6			
National championship Conference title Conference division title or championship game berth
