= Tony Sardisco =

American football player (1932–2006)

No. 70, 65, 64
- Positions: Guard, defensive end, linebacker

Personal information
- Born: December 5, 1932; Shreveport, Louisiana, U.S.
- Died: May 28, 2006 (aged 73); Shreveport, Louisiana, U.S.
- Listed height: 6 ft 2 in (1.88 m)
- Listed weight: 226 lb (103 kg)

Career information
- College: Tulane
- NFL draft: 1956: 6th round, 64th overall pick

Career history

Playing
- San Francisco 49ers (1956); Washington Redskins (1956); Boston Patriots (1960–1962)

Coaching
- Buffalo Bills (1968) Defensive line

Awards and highlights
- First-team All-American (1955); Second-team All-SEC (1955)

Career NFL/AFL statistics
- Games played: 50
- Games started: 35
- Fumble recoveries: 1
- Stats at Pro Football Reference

Anthony Guy Sardisco (December 5, 1932 – May 28, 2006) was an American football guard/linebacker.

== College career ==
Sardisco played guard and linebacker for the Green Wave teams of 1952–55. He served as team captain his senior season, leading Tulane to a 5–4–1 mark that year, including an upset win over eighth-ranked Alabama and a 13–13 season-ending tie with LSU. Sardisco was a two-time All-Southeastern Conference choice at guard during his years at Tulane and was named a first team All-American by the Football Writer's Association of America in 1955. Following his senior season, he played in the Blue-Gray Game, the Senior Bowl and the Chicago College All-Star Game, and was named outstanding lineman in the Blue-Gray game after making 14 unassisted tackles. In 1956, he graduated Tulane with a bachelor's degree in psychology.

== Professional career ==
He played in the National Football League for the San Francisco 49ers and Washington Redskins in 1956. He was selected 64th overall in the sixth round of the 1956 NFL draft as an offensive guard for the San Francisco 49ers, where his first contract was for $7,500 with a $250 bonus. After 10 games, he was traded to the Washington Redskins, where he finished the season. His positions were linebacker and guard, and he wore number 64.

His professional football career was then interrupted when he served in the U.S. Air Force. He continued to play football, making All-Air Force in 1957 and All-Service in 1957 and 1958.

He returned to professional football with the Calgary Stampeders in the Canadian Football League in 1959.

Sardisco returned to the states to help launch the American Football League (AFL), and he played guard for the Boston Patriots from 1960 to 1963. He served as team captain for the inaugural Boston Patriots team. He was named All-AFL the 1961 season and played three seasons in all with the Patriots.

== Coaching career ==
Following his playing career, Sardisco turned to coaching. He served as an assistant coach at his high school alma mater.

On February 7, 1968, it was announced that Sardisco was hired to coach defensive line for the Buffalo Bills. It was the first time the Bills had five full-time assistants since 1964.

Sardisco was an assistant coach at Temple under George Makris in 1969.

In 1970, Sardisco became the head football coach at Jesuit High School (now Loyola College Prep) in Shreveport, Louisiana. He subsequently became their athletics director and a psychology teacher in 1973, and remained as the athletics director at Jesuit High School for twelve more years.

== Legacy ==
He was inducted into the Tulane Athletics Hall of Fame in 1982 and to the Greater New Orleans Sports Hall of Fame in 1990. He also was inducted into the Louisiana Sports Hall of Fame in 2004.

He died at age 73 from a myocardial infarction at his home in Shreveport.

== See also ==
- Other American Football League players
