= Kevin Hunt (American football) =

American football player (1948–2015)

No. 64, 62, 72, 76
- Position: Tackle

Personal information
- Born: November 29, 1948; Framingham, Massachusetts, U.S.
- Died: May 22, 2015 (aged 66); Londonderry, New Hampshire, U.S.
- Listed height: 6 ft 5 in (1.96 m)
- Listed weight: 260 lb (118 kg)

Career information
- High school: Burlington (VT)
- College: Doane
- NFL draft: 1971: 10th round, 246th overall pick

Career history
- Green Bay Packers (1972); New England Patriots (1973); Houston Oilers (1973–1977); New Orleans Saints (1978)

Career NFL statistics
- Games played: 70
- Games started: 22
- Stats at Pro Football Reference

Richard Kevin Hunt (November 29, 1948 – May 22, 2015) was an American professional football player who was an offensive lineman for seven seasons for the Green Bay Packers, New England Patriots, Houston Oilers, and New Orleans Saints.
