= Carl Vereen =

American football player (born 1936)

No. 74
- Position: Offensive tackle

Personal information
- Born: January 27, 1936 (age 90); Miami, Florida, U.S.
- Listed height: 6 ft 2 in (1.88 m)
- Listed weight: 247 lb (112 kg)

Career information
- High school: Miami
- College: Georgia Tech
- NFL draft: 1957: 4th round, 41st overall pick

Career history
- Green Bay Packers (1957)

Awards and highlights
- Second-team All-American (1955); Second-team All-SEC (1956)

Career NFL statistics
- Games played: 12
- Stats at Pro Football Reference

Carl Harry Vereen (born January 27, 1936) is an American former professional football player who was an offensive tackle for the Green Bay Packers of the National Football League (NFL). He played college football for the Georgia Tech Yellow Jackets.

== Early life ==
Vereen was born on January 27, 1936, in Miami, Florida, where he would go on to attend Miami High School. Vereen played football at Miami, where he was selected for Scholastic Magazine's All-America high school football team. He was also named to a local All-City team, an All-State team and All-Southern team. In addition to football, Vereen was on the school's track-and-field team, where he competed in shot put and discus.

== College career ==
Vereen received a scholarship to attend Georgia Tech. During his time with the Yellow Jackets, he was named a second-team All-American by the Newspaper Enterprise Association. He was also selected to play in the 1957 Chicago College All-Star Game, losing to the NFL champion New York Giants 22–12.

Vereen was also a first-team All-American for the Georgia Tech Yellow Jackets track and field team, finished 3rd in the discus throw at the 1955 NCAA track and field championships.

== Professional career ==
Vereen was selected 41st overall in the fourth round of the 1957 NFL draft by the Green Bay Packers. He was also drafted by Vancouver of the Canadian Football League. He sign a contract with the Packers though in January 1957. He played all 12 games that season with the Packers. In the summer of 1958, Vereen announced his retirement from professional football, with head coach Ray McLean attributing the retirement to an opportunity for Vereen to start a business career.

== Personal life ==
Vereen married Emasue Alford in June 1957.
