= Bill Glass =

American football player (1935–2021)

No. 64, 53, 80
- Positions: Defensive end, center, tackle

Personal information
- Born: August 16, 1935; Texarkana, Texas, U.S.
- Died: December 5, 2021 (aged 86); Waxahachie, Texas, U.S.
- Listed height: 6 ft 5 in (1.96 m)
- Listed weight: 252 lb (114 kg)

Career information
- High school: W. B. Ray (Corpus Christi, Texas)
- College: Baylor
- NFL draft: 1957: 1st round, 12th overall pick

Career history
- Saskatchewan Roughriders (1957); Detroit Lions (1958–1961); Cleveland Browns (1962–1968)

Awards and highlights
- NFL champion (1964); Second-team All-Pro (1965); 4× Pro Bowl (1962–1964, 1967); Cleveland Browns legends (2007); Unanimous All-American (1956); First-team All-SWC (1956)

Career NFL statistics
- Interceptions: 4
- Fumble recoveries: 9
- Total touchdowns: 2
- Stats at Pro Football Reference
- College Football Hall of Fame

William Sheppeard Glass (August 16, 1935 – December 5, 2021) was an American professional football player who was a defensive end for 11 seasons in the National Football League (NFL), beginning with the Detroit Lions and finishing his career as a standout with the Cleveland Browns. He played college football for the Baylor Bears and was elected to the College Football Hall of Fame in 1985.

Glass lettered three years at Baylor University (1954–56) and was unanimous All-America guard in 1956. He made 154 tackles in 10 games. His pro career covered one year with Saskatchewan in the Canadian Football League (CFL) (1957); then four years with Detroit (1958–61); and seven years with Cleveland (1962–68).

Glass followed in his older brother's footsteps onto the football field. He became an All-American football player at Baylor University. Glass lettered three years at Baylor University (1954–56) and was chosen as All-America guard in 1956. He was taken at #12 in the first round of the 1957 NFL draft by the Detroit Lions, but signed with the Canadian Football League Saskatchewan Roughriders. After a year in the CFL, he signed with and spent four years with Detroit. He went to Cleveland in 1962 as part of the trade that sent quarterback Jim Ninowski back to Cleveland, along with running back Howard "Hopalong" Cassady. In return, the Lions received quarterback Milt Plum, running back Tom Watkins, and linebacker Dave Lloyd.

Glass started for seven years with Cleveland. He became a Pro Bowl defensive end with the Browns, playing a key role in the team's NFL championship in 1964 and Eastern Division championship in 1965. He retired after the 1968 season.

Recent research has estimated that Glass had 77.5 sacks during his 94 games with the Browns, which included 16.5 in 1965. He still holds the single-season record in sacks, but has since been passed by Myles Garrett for the all-time career record.

Glass published a memoir called Get in the Game! This book is the life story of "the greatest defensive end of the Cleveland Browns." His book Stand Tall and Straight (1967, Word Books) written with Stan Mosier and Dr. Leslie E. Moser, advised young men on successful life skills, and went into multiple printings. Glass appeared at churches around the United States to promote the book.

Glass spent several off seasons attending Southwestern Seminary. He worked with Rev. Billy Graham, who encouraged Glass toward a life in the ministry. He founded Bill Glass Ministries in 1969. Since 1972, his efforts have focused on prison ministries, bringing the gospel to inmates across America.

Glass died on December 5, 2021, at the age of 86.
