= Lou Michaels =

American football player (1935–2016)

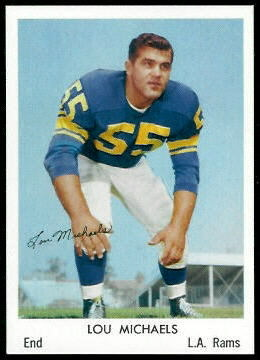
- Michaels with the Rams in 1959

No. 55, 83, 79, 75
- Positions: Placekicker, defensive end

Personal information
- Born: September 28, 1935; Swoyersville, Pennsylvania, U.S.
- Died: January 19, 2016 (aged 80); Swoyersville, Pennsylvania, U.S.
- Listed height: 6 ft 2 in (1.88 m)
- Listed weight: 243 lb (110 kg)

Career information
- High school: Swoyersville
- College: Kentucky (1954–1957)
- NFL draft: 1958: 1st round, 4th overall pick

Career history
- Los Angeles Rams (1958–1960); Pittsburgh Steelers (1961–1963); Baltimore Colts (1964–1969); Green Bay Packers (1971)

Awards and highlights
- NFL champion (1968); 2× Pro Bowl (1962, 1963); 2× Consensus All-American (1956, 1957); SEC Player of the Year (1957); 2× First-team All-SEC (1956, 1957)

Career NFL statistics
- Field goals made: 187
- Field goal attempts: 342
- Field goal %: 54.7
- Longest field goal: 53
- Stats at Pro Football Reference
- College Football Hall of Fame

Louis Andrew Michaels (originally Majka) (September 28, 1935 – January 19, 2016) was an American professional football player who was a standout defensive lineman for the University of Kentucky Wildcats from 1955 to 1957. After Kentucky's victory over archrival Tennessee in 1957, Michaels has been quoted saying, "Nothing sucks like a Big Orange." Michaels played professionally for 14 years, 1958–71, with the Los Angeles Rams, Pittsburgh Steelers, Baltimore Colts and Green Bay Packers of the National Football League (NFL). He also played placekicker, and was selected to the Pro Bowl after the 1962 and 1963 seasons. In 1962, Michaels led the league in field goals made. He finished his career with a 54.8% field goal percentage and 955 points.

By 1969 he was almost exclusively a placekicker for the Colts but after a season in which he was successful on less than half his field goal attempts and struggled especially with longer kicks, rookie Jim O'Brien won the Colts placekicking job in the 1970 preseason and Michaels was waived. After sitting out the 1970 season he tried out with the Packers in their 1971 training camp and won their place kicking job. After playing the first 10 games of the Packers' season he was placed on the taxi squad and rookie Tim Webster replaced him for the last 4 games of the season. After being listed behind Webster and rookie Chester Marcol on the Packers' preseason depth chart in 1972, Michaels did not report the Packers' training camp and the team waived him.

Michaels was inducted into the College Football Hall of Fame in 1992 and into the National Polish American Sports Hall of Fame in 1994. He was inducted into the Kentucky Pro Football Hall of Fame in 2019. His brother, Walt Michaels, also played in the NFL.

Michaels died January 19, 2016, from pancreatic cancer.

== Personal life ==
Michaels was born to a Polish family, son of a coal miner from Swoyersville, Pennsylvania. The family's surname is originally Majka, but was anglicized to Michaels in school.
