= 1957 Maryland Terrapins football team =

American college football season

1957 Maryland Terrapins football
- Conference: Atlantic Coast Conference
- Record: 5–5 (4–3 ACC)
- Head coach: Tommy Mont (2nd season)
- Offensive scheme: Split-T
- Captains: Gene Alderton; Jack Healy
- Home stadium: Byrd Stadium

1957 Atlantic Coast Conference football standings
	Conf.					Overall
Team	W		L		T	W		L		T
No. 15 NC State $	5	–	0	–	1	7	–	1	–	2
No. 16 Duke	5	–	1	–	1	6	–	3	–	2
Clemson	4	–	3	–	0	7	–	3	–	0
North Carolina	4	–	3	–	0	7	–	3	–	0
Maryland	4	–	3	–	0	5	–	5	–	0
Virginia	2	–	4	–	0	3	–	6	–	1
South Carolina	2	–	5	–	0	5	–	5	–	0
Wake Forest	0	–	7	–	0	0	–	10	–	0
$ – Conference champion; Rankings from AP poll

The 1957 Maryland Terrapins football team represented the University of Maryland in the 1957 college football season as a member of the Atlantic Coast Conference. They were led by second-year head coach Tommy Mont, who guided Maryland to a 5–5 record, which proved to be the only non-losing season in his three-year tenure. One highlight of the season was the attendance of Elizabeth II and The Duke of Edinburgh at the game against North Carolina.

== Schedule ==
Date	Opponent	Site	TV	Result	Attendance	Source
September 21	vs. No. 2 Texas A&M*	Cotton Bowl; Dallas, TX	NBC	L 13–21	25,000	
September 28	NC State	Byrd Stadium; College Park, MD		L 13–48	24,000	
October 5	at No. 4 Duke	Duke Stadium; Durham, NC		L 0–14	25,000	
October 12	Wake Forest	Byrd Stadium; College Park, MD		W 27–0	16,000	
October 19	No. 14 North Carolina	Byrd Stadium; College Park, MD		W 21–7	43,000	
October 26	Tennessee*	Byrd Stadium; College Park, MD		L 0–16	26,000	
November 2	at South Carolina	Carolina Stadium; Columbia, SC		W 10–6	18,000	
November 9	at Clemson	Memorial Stadium; Clemson, SC		L 7–26	28,000	
November 15	at Miami (FL)*	Burdine Stadium; Miami, FL		W 16–6	42,701	
November 23	Virginia	Byrd Stadium; College Park, MD (rivalry)		W 12–0	10,500	
*Non-conference game; Rankings from AP Poll released prior to the game

== Before the season ==
Maryland returned a deep and experienced team for 1957. Sports Illustrated gave an optimistic appraisal and predicted the team would be ready to come back from the previous season's poor result. It noted, "The line has experience and depth. The backfield only lacks speed." Moreover, sophomore guard Rodney Breedlove (who previously played on the freshman team) was a highly touted prospect.

== Season ==
In the season opener, second-ranked Texas A&M beat Maryland, 21–13. Although defeated, the Daytona Beach Morning Journal called the Terrapins' effort "impressive". Before the game against NC State, Mont worried about the inexperience of his team, particularly his quarterback Dickie Lewis and three sophomore linemen. The Wolfpack routed Maryland, 48–13, and NC State halfback Dick Christy scored three touchdowns, which included a 96-yard kickoff return. Maryland did not tally until the third quarter, when back Howie Dare returned a kickoff for a score.

The following week, Maryland lost to fourth-ranked Duke, 14–0, but escaped without any injuries, which The Baltimore Sun considered "a major victory in itself". Against Wake Forest, Mont put in third-string senior quarterback John Fritsch late in the first half. He led the team to score two touchdowns before halftime, and then led a 72-yard drive for the final score in the fourth quarter. Maryland won, 27–0.

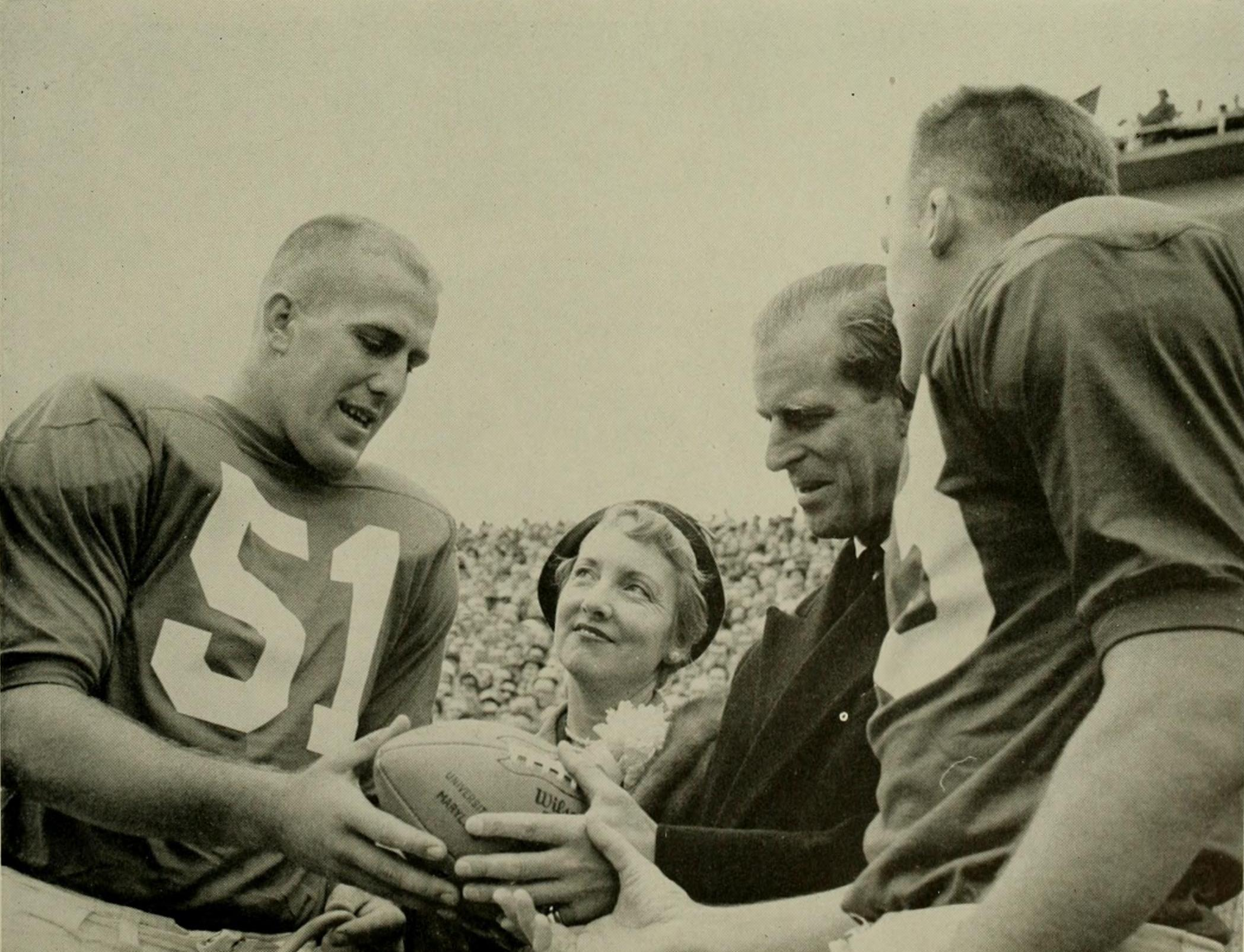
Co-captains Gene Alderton (left) and Jack Healy present Prince Philip a game ball.

The highlight of the season was the home game against 14th-ranked North Carolina (3–1), which featured a return to College Park by former head coach Jim Tatum and the attendance of Elizabeth II. During a visit to the United States, the Queen had expressed a desire to watch her first game of American football. In the first quarter, Maryland halfback Howard Dare fumbled and North Carolina linebacker Jack Lineberger recovered the ball on the Terrapins' 44-yard line. North Carolina was subsequently forced to punt, but recovered it at the Maryland 35 yard-line. On the ensuing possession, Tar Heel halfback Daley Goff rushed 11 yards for a touchdown. In the third quarter, Maryland gained excellent field position when Goff received a bad punt snap, and the Terps took over on the Carolina 38-yard line. Maryland quarterback Bob Rusevlyan later scored on a one-yard sneak. In the fourth quarter, halfback Ted Kershner broke away for an 81-yard touchdown run to take the lead, 14–7. Soon after, Fullback Jim Joyce capped a 67-yard drive with a 13-yard rush for a score. With a final result of 21–7, the Maryland players carried Mont to the Queen and Prince Philip's box. Mont said it was a day that "I will revel in for the rest of my life."

Tennessee remained in control against Maryland throughout the game. Maryland kicked off to start the game, and Terrapins guard Rod Breedlove recovered the ball on the Volunteers' 18-yard line. His team, however, was unable to convert for any points in its subsequent possession, and fell inches short of the end zone. For the remainder of the game, Maryland was able to advance only once into opposing territory, and then to just the 37-yard line. Tennessee won, 16–0.

Maryland edged South Carolina, 10–6, behind quarterback John Fritsch's first quarter field goal and a point after touchdown conversion on a score in the final quarter. A week later, Maryland recovered four Clemson fumbles, but the Tigers took control in the third quarter. Quarterback Harvey White passed for two touchdowns, and tailback George Usry and fullback Bob Spooner each tallied as well. Clemson won with the final result of 26–7.

Maryland then met eight-point favorites Miami, which boasted a stout defense. Fritsch gave the Terrapins an early lead with a first quarter field goal. Fullback Phil Perlo later scored on a short run, and quarterback Bob Rusevlyan's "accurate arm" connected with tailback Howie Dare for Maryland's final tally, which resulted in a 16–6 upset. Rusevlyan again led Maryland to victory, 12–0, in a mud-soaked season finale against Virginia.

== After the season ==
The Terrapins improved from the previous season and compiled a 5–5 record, which proved to be the best during Coach Mont's tenure. Maryland's 4–3 record in the ACC put the Terrapins in a tie for third place in the conference.

== Personnel ==
=== Roster ===
The 1957 team consisted of the following letterwinners:

- Gene Alderton
- Joe Behrmann
- Rod Breedlove
- Bill Burgly
- Charles Carroll
- Fred Cole
- Ed Cooke
- Howie Dare
- Nick DeCicco
- Tom Flor
- John Forbes
- John Fritsch
- Joe Gardi
- Tom Gunderman
- Fred Hamilton
- Jim Hatter
- Ralph Hawkins
- Don Healy
- Bill Johnstone
- Jim Joyce
- Fred Kern
- Ted Kershner
- Ron Laneve
- Bob Layman
- Dickie Lewis
- Wilbur Main
- Bill Martin
- Phil Perlo
- Bob Rusevlyan
- Victor Schwartz
- Kurt Schwarz
- Ben Scotti
- Tom Stefl
- Bill Steppe
- Paul Tonetti
- Bill Turner
- Gene Verardi

=== Coaching staff ===
The coaching staff consisted of:

- Tommy Mont, head coach
- William Dovell
- Ed Fullerton
- Jack Hennemier
- Johnny Idzik
- Fred Layman
- Roy Lester
- Jim Peebles
- Bob Ward
