= List of North Texas Mean Green in the NFL draft =

This is a list of North Texas Mean Green football players in the NFL draft.

== Key ==
B	Back	K	Kicker	NT	Nose tackle
C	Center	LB	Linebacker	FB	Fullback
DB	Defensive back	P	Punter	HB	Halfback
DE	Defensive end	QB	Quarterback	WR	Wide receiver
DT	Defensive tackle	RB	Running back	G	Guard
E	End	T	Offensive tackle	TE	Tight end

== Selections ==
Year	Round	Pick	Overall	Player	Team	Position
1948	8	9	64	Jim Cooper	Pittsburgh Steelers	C
1948	27	8	253	Felton Whitlow	Pittsburgh Steelers	T
1949	13	4	125	R. R. Walston	Pittsburgh Steelers	G
1949	18	4	175	Dick Nutt	New York Giants	B
1949	21	5	206	A. D. Cate	New York Giants	G
1950	25	13	326	Jim Eagles	Philadelphia Eagles	C
1951	23	1	268	Cecil Martin	Washington Redskins	B
1951	26	11	314	Quincy Armstrong	New York Giants	C
1952	4	11	48	Ray Renfro	Cleveland Browns	B
1952	8	5	90	Bill Bishop	Chicago Bears	T
1952	16	4	185	Jim Brewer	Philadelphia Eagles	G
1953	13	5	150	Larry Strickland	Chicago Bears	C
1953	21	7	248	Ken Bahnsen	San Francisco 49ers	E
1953	28	10	335	Ray Verkick	Cleveland Browns	T
1954	11	2	123	Ken Hall	Green Bay Packers	E
1954	21	7	248	John Cavaglieri	Washington Redskins	T
1954	22	1	263	Ralph Reynolds	San Francisco 49ers	B
1954	26	9	310	Glenn Holtzman	Los Angeles Rams	T
1955	2	12	25	Dean Renfro	Cleveland Browns	B
1955	8	10	95	Gene Verkerk	Chicago Bears	T
1955	9	1	98	Charlie McGinty	Chicago Cardinals	E
1955	18	3	208	Charlie Shepard	Baltimore Colts	B
1956	11	6	127	Denni Shaw	Baltimore Colts	E
1956	14	11	168	Tom Runnels	Los Angeles Rams	B
1958	21	1	242	Ray Toole	Chicago Cardinals	B
1958	25	6	295	Bill Groce	Pittsburgh Steelers	B
1958	28	10	335	Garland Warren	San Francisco 49ers	C
1959	11	9	129	Ed Gray	Chicago Bears	T
1959	16	7	187	Bill Carrico	Pittsburgh Steelers	G
1960	5	7	55	Abner Haynes	Pittsburgh Steelers	RB
1960	14	2	158	Harold Stanger	Los Angeles Rams	C
1960	16	11	191	George Boynton	Baltimore Colts	B
1962	4	2	44	Art Perkins	Los Angeles Rams	RB
1962	8	2	100	Dick Farris	Los Angeles Rams	G
1963	19	8	260	Bob Price	San Francisco 49ers	G
1964	7	10	94	Bobby Smith	Pittsburgh Steelers	FB
1964	8	5	103	Bill McWatters	Minnesota Vikings	RB
1964	12	13	167	Dwain Bean	Green Bay Packers	B
1965	12	11	165	Jim Moore	Detroit Lions	LB
1965	13	1	169	Carl Lockhart	New York Giants	DB
1966	5	16	80	Martin Kahn	Atlanta Falcons	T
1966	9	1	126	Bob Sanders	Atlanta Falcons	C
1967	3	16	69	Vidal Carlin	St. Louis Cardinals	QB
1967	7	13	172	John Love	Washington Redskins	WR
1968	8	21	213	Lindon Endsley	Kansas City Chiefs	C
1968	8	27	219	Ed Brantley	Cincinnati Bengals	T
1968	9	2	221	Henry Holland	Atlanta Falcons	C
1968	10	27	273	James Russell	Cincinnati Bengals	E
1969	1	4	4	Joe Greene	Pittsburgh Steelers	DT
1969	7	4	160	Chuck Beatty	Pittsburgh Steelers	DB
1969	13	5	322	Michael Shook	Washington Redskins	DB
1969	16	10	400	Billy Woods	Denver Broncos	DB
1970	1	9	9	Cedrick Hardman	San Francisco 49ers	DE
1970	2	2	28	Ronnie Shanklin	Pittsburgh Steelers	WR
1970	5	22	126	Steve Ramsey	New Orleans Saints	QB
1970	10	1	235	Glen Holloway	Chicago Bears	G
1970	16	1	391	Robert Helterbran	Chicago Bears	G
1971	1	26	26	Lenny Dunlap	Baltimore Colts	DB
1971	3	23	75	Willie Parker	San Francisco 49ers	C
1971	9	14	222	Wilmur Levels	Cleveland Browns	DB
1971	14	19	357	Tom Gipson	Oakland Raiders	DT
1971	16	10	400	Glenn Tucker	Washington Redskins	LB
1972	13	12	324	Steve Sullivan	New York Jets	T
1973	14	17	355	Hurles Scales	Cincinnati Bengals	DB
1975	14	10	348	Stan Blackmon	Green Bay Packers	TE
1976	9	27	264	Beasley Reece	Dallas Cowboys	DB
1976	15	28	431	Mel Davis	Pittsburgh Steelers	DE
1979	3	22	78	Reginald Lewis	Tampa Bay Buccaneers	DE
1981	7	9	175	Ron Battle	Los Angeles Rams	TE
1982	4	17	100	Louis Haynes	Kansas City Chiefs	LB
1982	5	3	114	Tony Elliott	New Orleans Saints	DE
1983	11	18	297	Mark Witte	Tampa Bay Buccaneers	TE
1989	3	23	79	Kim Phillips	New Orleans Saints	DB
1991	6	6	145	Erric Pegram	Atlanta Falcons	RB
1991	6	26	165	Scott Bowles	San Francisco 49ers	T
1995	6	34	205	Anthony Bridges	Arizona Cardinals	DB
2004	6	17	182	Cody Spencer	Oakland Raiders	LB
2021	4	24	129	Jaelon Darden	Tampa Bay Buccaneers	WR
