= List of Central Washington Wildcats in the NFL draft =

This is a list of Central Washington Wildcats players in the NFL draft.

== Key ==
B	Back	K	Kicker	NT	Nose tackle
C	Center	LB	Linebacker	FB	Fullback
DB	Defensive back	P	Punter	HB	Halfback
DE	Defensive end	QB	Quarterback	WR	Wide receiver
DT	Defensive tackle	RB	Running back	G	Guard
E	End	T	Offensive tackle	TE	Tight end

== Selections ==
Year	Round	Pick	Overall	Player	Team	Position
1947	11	3	88	L. G. Carmody	Washington Redskins	B
1958	26	6	307	Corky Bridges	Los Angeles Rams	B
1966	19	5	280	Byron Johnson	Dallas Cowboys	OT
1971	13	15	327	David Knapman	Cincinnati Bengals	TE
1992	11	13	293	Eric Boles	New York Jets	WR
