= Bob Brodhead =

American football player (1936–1996)

No. 84, 17, 16, 11, 10
- Position: Quarterback

Personal information
- Born: December 20, 1936; Kittanning, Pennsylvania, U.S.
- Died: February 11, 1996 (aged 59); Baton Rouge, Louisiana, U.S.
- Listed height: 6 ft 2 in (1.88 m)
- Listed weight: 207 lb (94 kg)

Career information
- College: Duke
- NFL draft: 1958: 12th round, 144th overall pick

Career history

Playing
- Saskatchewan Roughriders (1959); Buffalo Bills (1960); Cleveland / Canton / Philadelphia Bulldogs (1961-1966)

Coaching
- Philadelphia Bulldogs (1966) Assistant; Portland Thunder (1975) Head coach

Operations
- Cleveland Browns (1967–1971) Business manager; Houston Oilers (1971) General manager; Cleveland Browns (1971–1973) Treasurer; Portland Thunder (1975) General manager; Miami Dolphins (1980–1982) Director of finances; LSU (1982–1986) Athletic director; Southeastern Louisiana (1988–1989) Athletic director

Awards and highlights
- CFL champion (1966); UFL champion (1964); UFL Most Valuable Player (1964); 2× All-UFL (1961, 1964); 2× All-COFL (1965, 1966)

Career NFL statistics
- Passing attempts: 25
- Passing completions: 7
- Completion percentage: 28.0%
- TD–INT: 0–3
- Passing yards: 75
- Passer rating: 0
- Stats at Pro Football Reference
- Executive profile at Pro Football Reference

Robert Edgar Brodhead (December 20, 1936 – February 11, 1996) was an American gridiron football player, executive, and college athletics administrator. He was the athletic director at Louisiana State University (LSU) from 1982 to 1987.

== Playing ==
Brodhead attended Duke University, where he played quarterback on the Duke Blue Devils football team. During that time he led the Blue Devils to the 1958 Orange Bowl and shared the quarterback position with Sonny Jurgensen.

Brodhead was drafted by the Cleveland Browns in 1958 but went on active duty in the armed services before being able to join the Browns. He returned to the team during training camp in 1959, but was cut from the team. Brodhead instead played for the Saskatchewan Roughriders of the Canadian Football League (CFL) that year, as backup to Don Allard. In 1960, he signed with the upstart Buffalo Bills of the fledgling American Football League (AFL). He played one season, in 1960, for the Bills, starting one game and scoring two points before having a brief stint with the CFL's Edmonton Eskimos. In 1961, he embarked on a career in minor league football with the Canton Bulldogs and Cleveland Bulldogs in the United Football League (UFL). Brodhead lead Canton to a UFL title in 1964 and was named the league MVP. In 1965 and 1966 with the Philadelphia Bulldogs of the Continental Football League. He led the Bulldogs to the Continental Football League title in 1966 with a win over the Orlando Panthers. Brodhead was elected to the Minor League Football Hall of Fame for his career with the Canton/Cleveland/Philadelphia Bulldogs.

== Administration ==
=== Cleveland Browns ===
In 1967, the Cleveland Browns appointed to the newly-created position of business manager. He remained with the Browns until February 13, 1971, when he was named general manager of the Houston Oilers. He resigned on April 1, 1971 and returned to the Browns as treasurer. He resigned at the end of the 1973 season.

=== Portland Thunder ===
In 1975, Brodhead was named president and general manager of the Portland Thunder of the World Football League. On September 8, 1975, he fired head coach Greg Barton after a 1–5 start and took over as his interim replacement. After his one-game stint as the Thunder head coach, Brodhead hired Joe Gardi to take over for the remainder of the season. The World Football League folded on October 22, 1975. After the WFL folded, Brodhead remained in Oregon and worked as an accountant. In 1976, he interviewed for the athletic director's position at the University of Oregon.

=== Miami Dolphins ===
In 1981, Brodhead returned to the National Football League as the Miami Dolphins director of finances. In this role, he was responsible for the team's budget and financial planning as well as negotiating contracts.

=== LSU ===
On May 21, 1982, Brodhead was named athletic director at Louisiana State University. One of his first hires was women's basketball coach Sue Gunter. Gunter coached at LSU for 22 seasons and guided the Lady Tigers to the NCAA tournament 14 times, including the Final Four in her final campaign of 2003-04.

In 1983, Brodhead hired Miami Hurricanes associate head coach Skip Bertman to coach the LSU Tigers baseball team. Bertman guided LSU to five national championships (1991, 1993, 1996, 1997, 2000) and 11 trips to the College World Series in 18 seasons (1984-2001). Bertman became LSU's athletic director upon his retirement from the diamond, remaining in the position through June 2008.

In football, Brodhead inherited coach Jerry Stovall, an LSU All-American and runner up for the Heisman Trophy in 1962, who took over as head coach following Bo Rein's death in 1980 and led the Tigers to an appearance in the 1983 Orange Bowl. Brodhead fired Stovall after a 4-7 season in 1983 and replaced him with Bill Arnsparger. Arnsparger went 26-8-3 in three seasons and coached LSU to the 1986 SEC championship and two Sugar Bowl berths.

In 1982, the National Collegiate Athletic Association began a four-year investigation into the LSU Tigers men's basketball program and head coach Dale Brown. On April 18, 1986, Brodhead pleaded guilty to conspiracy to intercept radio communications after the Federal Bureau of Investigation seized covert listening devices from his office. Brodhead admitted that he intended to listen in to NCAA investigators' interviews with LSU basketball players and said that Brown was aware of the plan. He was fined $1,000 sentenced to 200 hours of community service. The NCAA cited LSU for sixteen rules violations and stripped the Tigers of two scholarships. On April 25, 1986, the LSU Board of Supervisors voted 15–1 to freeze Brodhead's salary.

On October 8, 1986, Brodhead was suspended with pay after he was cited for violating state ethics laws by receiving payment for hosting a radio show on WJBO, which had contracts with the LSU athletic department, and accepting a free trip to Mexico from station owner Doug Manship. Brodhead resigned on October 21, 1986. The Commission on Ethics for Public Officials fined Brodhead $2,500, but immediately suspended the penalty because the violations were minor and there was no evidence of intentional misconduct.

Brodhead authored Sacked! The Dark Side of Sports at Louisiana State University, which was published in 1987. (ISBN 0-9446790-0-5)

=== Southeastern Louisiana ===
In 1988, Brodhead was named athletic director at Southeastern Louisiana University. He developed a five-year plan to upgrade the university's athletic program, which including reviving the school's football program. Wally English was hired as football coach, but he was fired after only three months "philosophical differences" with Brodhead. Southeastern was unable to raise enough funds to bring back football and Brodhead was fired on April 25, 1989. In 1990, a judge found that Southeastern Louisiana had breached its contract with Brodhead and awarded him $275,000.

== Later life ==
In 1992, Brodhead filed a Chapter 7 liquidation petition due to "horrendous business decisions" since leaving LSU. He and his wife declared $105,000 in debts and $20,000 in assets.

Brodhead died on February 11, 1996 at the age of 59. Another former LSU athletic director, Carl Maddox, died five days later.

== See also ==
- List of American Football League players
