= Jamie Caleb =

American gridiron football player (born 1936)

No. 36, 23, 30, 37, 32
- Positions: Halfback, fullback

Personal information
- Born: October 29, 1936 (age 90); Calhoun, Louisiana, U.S.
- Listed height: 6 ft 1 in (1.85 m)
- Listed weight: 210 lb (95 kg)

Career information
- High school: Carroll (Monroe, Louisiana)
- College: Grambling State
- NFL draft: 1959: 16th round, 191st overall pick

Career history
- Cleveland Browns (1960); Minnesota Vikings (1961); Hamilton Tiger-Cats (1962–1963); Cleveland Browns (1965); Philadelphia Bulldogs (1966); Charleston Rockets (1967)

Awards and highlights
- Grey Cup champion (1963); Continental FL champion (1966)

Career NFL statistics
- Rushing yards: 71
- Rushing average: 6.5
- Touchdowns: 1
- Stats at Pro Football Reference

Jamie J. Caleb (born October 29, 1936) is an American former gridiron football player who played for the Hamilton Tiger-Cats of the Canadian Football League (CFL) and the Minnesota Vikings and Cleveland Browns of the National Football League (NFL). He won the Grey Cup with the Tiger-Cats in 1963. He played college football for the Grambling Tigers and was drafted in the 1959 NFL draft by Cleveland (Round 16, #191 overall). Caleb, a fullback, joined the Philadelphia Bulldogs of the Continental Football League (COFL) and because of injuries, he was also pressed into action as the place kicker. In the 1966 Continental Football League Championship Game at Temple Stadium in Philadelphia, he kicked the winning field goal for the Bulldogs to win the CFL Championship.
