= 1957 Clemson Tigers football team =

American college football season

1957 Clemson Tigers football
- Conference: Atlantic Coast Conference

Ranking
- Coaches: No. 18
- Record: 7–3 (4–3 ACC)
- Head coach: Frank Howard (18th season)
- Captains: John Grdijan; Leon Kaltenback
- Home stadium: Memorial Stadium

1957 Atlantic Coast Conference football standings
	Conf.					Overall
Team	W		L		T	W		L		T
No. 15 NC State $	5	–	0	–	1	7	–	1	–	2
No. 16 Duke	5	–	1	–	1	6	–	3	–	2
Clemson	4	–	3	–	0	7	–	3	–	0
North Carolina	4	–	3	–	0	7	–	3	–	0
Maryland	4	–	3	–	0	5	–	5	–	0
Virginia	2	–	4	–	0	3	–	6	–	1
South Carolina	2	–	5	–	0	5	–	5	–	0
Wake Forest	0	–	7	–	0	0	–	10	–	0
$ – Conference champion; Rankings from AP poll

The 1957 Clemson Tigers football team was an American football team that represented Clemson College in the Atlantic Coast Conference (ACC) during the 1957 college football season. In its 18th season under head coach Frank Howard, the team compiled a 7–3 record (4–3 against conference opponents), tied for third place in the ACC, was ranked No. 18 in the final Coaches Poll, and outscored opponents by a total of 216 to 78. The team played its home games at Memorial Stadium in Clemson, South Carolina.

The annual "Big Thursday" game with South Carolina drew a crowd of 44,020, the largest crowd to see a football game up to that date in the state of South Carolina. Clemson played its last game against Presbyterian College; Presbyterian was Clemson's season-opening game from 1930 until 1957.

Guard John Grdijan and Leon Kaltenback were the team captains. The team's statistical leaders included quarterback Harvey White with 841 passing yards, fullback Bob Spooner with 358 rushing yards, and Spooner and halfback Bill Mathis with 30 points (five touchdowns) each.

John Grdijan and Harvey White were selected as first-team players by the 1957 All-Atlantic Coast Conference football team. Four Clemson players were also named to the 1957 All-South Carolina football team: Grdijan, White, end Ray Masneri, and center Donnie Bunton.

== Schedule ==
Date	Time	Opponent	Rank	Site	Result	Attendance	Source
September 21	2:00 p.m.	Presbyterian*		Memorial Stadium; Clemson, SC	W 66–0	15,000	
September 28	2:00 p.m.	at North Carolina		Kenan Memorial Stadium; Chapel Hill, NC	L 0–26	16,000	
October 5	2:00 p.m.	No. 13 NC State		Memorial Stadium; Clemson, SC (rivalry)	L 7–13	17,000	
October 12	2:00 p.m.	at Virginia		Scott Stadium; Charlottesville, VA	W 20–6	18,000	
October 24	2:00 p.m.	at South Carolina		Carolina Stadium; Columbia, SC (rivalry)	W 13–0	44,020	
November 2	9:00 p.m.	at Rice*		Rice Stadium; Houston, TX	W 20–7		
November 9	2:00 p.m.	Maryland^{†}		Memorial Stadium; Clemson, SC	W 26–7	28,000	
November 16	2:00 p.m.	at No. 11 Duke	No. 14	Duke Stadium; Durham, NC	L 6–7	22,000	
November 23	2:00 p.m.	Wake Forest		Memorial Stadium; Clemson, SC	W 13–6	18,000	
November 30	2:00 p.m.	at Furman*		Sirrine Stadium; Greenville, SC	W 45–6	10,000	
*Non-conference game; ^{†}Homecoming; Rankings from AP Poll released prior to the game; All times are in Eastern time
