= Ben Paolucci =

American football player (born 1937)

No. 77
- Position: Defensive tackle

Personal information
- Born: March 5, 1937 (age 89); Cleveland, Ohio, U.S.
- Listed height: 6 ft 2 in (1.88 m)
- Listed weight: 240 lb (109 kg)

Career information
- High school: Detroit (MI) Cass Technical
- College: Wayne State
- NFL draft: 1958: 9th round, 109th overall pick

Career history
- Detroit Lions (1959)

Career NFL statistics
- Games played: 4
- Stats at Pro Football Reference

Ben John Paolucci (born March 5, 1937) is an American former professional football player who was a defensive tackle for the Detroit Lions of the National Football League (NFL) in 1959. He played college football for the Wayne State Warriors. He was selected in the ninth round with the 109th overall pick in the 1958 NFL Draft by the Lions.
