= Ed Cooke (American football) =

American football player (1935–2022)

No. 86, 80, 85, 82
- Positions: Defensive end, linebacker

Personal information
- Born: May 3, 1935; Pilot Mountain, North Carolina, U.S.
- Died: February 6, 2022 (aged 86); Jacksonville, Florida, U.S.
- Listed height: 6 ft 4 in (1.93 m)
- Listed weight: 250 lb (113 kg)

Career information
- High school: Granby (Norfolk, Virginia)
- College: Maryland (1954–1957)
- NFL draft: 1958: 3rd round, 29th overall pick

Career history
- Chicago Bears (1958); Philadelphia Eagles (1958); Baltimore Colts (1959); New York Titans / Jets (1960–1963); Denver Broncos (1964–1965); Miami Dolphins (1966–1967)

Awards and highlights
- NFL champion (1959); AFL All-Star (1966); First-team All-ACC (1957)

Career NFL/AFL statistics
- Interceptions: 7
- Touchdowns: 2
- Sacks: 22
- Stats at Pro Football Reference

Edward Grey Cooke (May 3, 1935 – February 6, 2022) was an American professional football defensive end and linebacker who played in both the National Football League (NFL) and the American Football League (AFL). In 1966, with the AFL's Miami Dolphins, he was selected to the AFL All-Star Team. Cooke played college football at Maryland and was drafted in the third round of the 1958 NFL draft.

== Early life ==
Cooke was born on May 3, 1935, in Pilot Mountain, North Carolina, to Porter and Chonnie (Denny) Cooke. He was one of five brothers. His family moved to Norfolk, Virginia when he was about 10-years old. They moved back to Pilot Mountain when he was in 8th and 9th grades, and then back to Norfolk in 1951, where they remained. He played basketball and six-man football (at quarterback) in Pilot Mountain. After returning to Norfolk, he starred in 11-man football for Granby High School, as a lineman. As a senior, his Granby team won the state high school football championship.

In high school, Cooke was even more well known for his track accomplishments, having set state records in shot put and discus. The Norfolk Sports Club named Cooke the city's outstanding high school track athlete of 1953.

== College career ==
Cooke attended the University of Maryland. He was recruited by Maryland's track coach Jim Kehoe, and chose Maryland because of its success in track and field. He obtained a Bachelor of Science degree in business and public administration in 1959, with a major in public relations. He also met and married his wife Jody Floyd, Maryland's 1955 homecoming queen, during his time at Maryland.

The 6 ft 4 in (1.93 m) 230 lb (104.3 kg) or 235 lb (106.6 kg) Cooke played offensive end, defensive end and punter on Maryland's football team, in the Atlantic Coast Conference (ACC). Coach Jim Tatum moved Cooke from tackle to end as a freshman. As a sophomore in 1955, Cooke's making the team was in question, as he lacked focus. This changed over time, especially after coach Tatum said he would cut Cooke after Cooke fell asleep during a team meeting. By the second game of the season, against UCLA, Cooke was playing at a high level, including two tackles for loss on consecutive plays from opposite ends of the defensive line.

In 1955, Maryland was 10–0 under coach Tatum during the regular season. The Terrapins went to the Orange Bowl, losing to Oklahoma 20–6. Maryland finished the season ranked No. 3 in the nation by the Associated Press (AP), with Oklahoma No. 1. In 1956, Tatum left Maryland to coach at the University of North Carolina, and Tommy Mont took over as head coach. Cooke was the number one end on the team going into the 1956 season. However, Cooke suffered a dislocated shoulder during the fourth game of the year against the University of Miami, and was lost for the remainder of the season. Maryland finished with a record of 2–7–1.

As a senior in 1957, Cooke was voted the ACC's Lineman of the Year in a poll of ACC coaches and sports writers. He was also an honorable mention All-American at end that year, and was named first-team All-ACC by the Associated Press. He led Maryland with 14 receptions, and punted 39 times with a 40-yard per punt average. Cooke was considered a fine receiver, but was more feared as a defensive end and pass rusher. The team's record improved to 5–5. Cooke was selected to play in the 1957 Blue Gray Game, and the August 1958 Chicago College All Star Game.

During the 1957 season, he played in a game between Maryland and the higher ranked University of North Carolina (now coached by Tatum) before Queen Elizabeth II and Prince Philip at Maryland's College Park campus. Maryland won 21–7. Cooke was excellent on defense in the game, caught two passes for 23 yards, and had five punts for 286 yards.

Cooke also was an ACC champion in the shot put and discus throw for the Maryland Terrapins track and field team. He was the ACC champion in shot put in 1956 and 1957, and was second in 1958; and was discus throwing champion in 1957 and 1958. He also threw the javelin.

While at Maryland, Cooke received Maryland's Guyckeson Award as the school's outstanding athlete. In 2014, he was inducted into the University of Maryland Athletics Hall of Fame for his accomplishments in both football and track and field.

== Professional career ==
=== National Football League (1958–59) ===
The Chicago Bears selected Cooke in the third round of the 1958 NFL draft (29th overall). Cooke appeared in three games for the Bears before being acquired by the Philadelphia Eagles in 1958. He played in seven games for the Eagles, starting six at left defensive end. He started the 1959 season on injured reserve with a severely sprained ankle. The Eagles waived Cooke in mid-October, having not played a game for the Eagles that season. He was signed by the Baltimore Colts for the last four games of the 1959 season, and appeared in those games on special teams. He signed a contract with the Colts in June 1960, but was waived two days before the 1960 Colts' season began.

=== American Football League (1960–67) ===
==== New York Titans/Jets ====
A few days after the Colts released him, Cooke signed with the New York Titans (later the New York Jets) for the inaugural season of the American Football League (AFL). He started three games for the Titans at defensive end. In 1961, the Titans moved him to left linebacker. He started all 14 games, with three interceptions and three quarterback sacks. In 1962, he again started all 14 games at left linebacker, with one interception and three sacks. In 1963, Cooke was placed on injured reserve before the season began, with a leg injury. He was activated in late October, and started two games at defensive end that year, of the nine games in which he appeared for the renamed New York Jets. He had 3.5 sacks.

==== Denver Broncos ====
In 1964, Cooke was sent to the Denver Broncos as part of a nine player trade; at the time the biggest trade in AFL history. The Jets received Wahoo McDaniel (the key player in the trade for New York), Gordy Holz, Bob Zeman, and Gene Prebola; while the Broncos received Jet starters Sid Fournet and Charlie Janerette, along with Cooke, Jim Price and Dick Guesman.

In 1964, he started all 14 games at left defensive end for the Broncos, with a career-high four quarterback sacks and one fumble recovery for a touchdown. On November 1, he recovered a fumble against the Kansas City Chiefs and ran 63 yards for a touchdown. He also reportedly recovered a Cookie Gilchrist fumble on December 13 in a game against the Buffalo Bills. In 1965, he started 12 games for the Broncos with three interceptions and one sack.

==== Miami Dolphins ====
Cooke was selected by the Miami Dolphins in the 1966 expansion draft for their inaugural season. He was the first Dolphins' captain. In 1966, he had arguably the best season of his career, being selected to play in the AFL's All-Star Game for the first and only time. He started 13 games at left defensive end, with 3.5 quarterback sacks. He was a standout player in the Dolphins first win in team history, on October 16, 1966; a 24–7 victory over the Broncos. He tackled Denver's quarterbacks three times for losses that day.

Cooke's final season came in 1967 with the Dolphins. He started 12 games at left defensive end, with three sacks. After the season, Cooke told the Dolphins he was not going to continue playing. The Dolphins placed him on waivers in April 1968. This was an accommodation to Cooke, as it allowed him to become a free agent should he have decided to continue in football.

== Personal life and death ==
During the off season, he worked for the P. B. Rice Insurance Agency in Harrisburg, Pennsylvania. After retiring from football, Cooke worked for General Electric, while living in Camp Hill, Pennsylvania. His wife Jody was a native of nearby Harrisburg. He became a real estate developer, including managing the development of Greenbrier, in Chesapeake, Virginia. He became president of his local Chamber of Commerce, owned a travel agency, and had his own radio show.

Cooke died on February 6, 2022 in Jacksonville, Florida.

== See also ==
- List of American Football League players
