= Ralph Hawkins (American football) =

American football coach (1935–2004)

Ralph Hawkins (May 4, 1935 – September 9, 2004) was an American football coach. He worked 35 years in the National Football League (NFL) for nine teams. In addition to a long career as a college coach, Hawkins coached some of the top defensive units in the NFL.

== Early years ==
Hawkins played at St. John's High School in Washington, D.C., winning Catholic league championships in baseball, basketball and football. During the '52-'53 school year, Hawkins was 1st team POST All Met in both Football and Basketball. After high school Hawkins attended the University of Maryland on a football scholarship, where he played quarterback, running back and defensive back. Hawkins played in the 1955 Orange Bowl, and later graduated with a degree in physical education.

== College coaching ==
Hawkins had a brief playing stint with the New York Titans before becoming head coach of football and an assistant basketball coach at Bishop Denis J. O'Connell High School in Arlington, Virginia in 1958. In June, 1959, he was replaced as head football coach by his St John's and Maryland teammate Bob Rusevlyan to return to the University of Maryland to complete his studies and help coach the Freshman football team. Hawkins served as graduate assistant at the University of Maryland, and went on to coach at several colleges: Southern Methodist University, U.S. Military Academy at West Point, the University of Kentucky and the University of Cincinnati.

== NFL years ==
Hawkins began his NFL coaching career with the Buffalo Bills from 1969 to 1971. He then served the Washington Redskins as a defensive assistant under George Allen from 1972 to 1977. In his first year on the staff, the Redskins advanced to Super Bowl VII, where they lost to the undefeated Miami Dolphins. During Hawkins' time in Washington, the Redskins posted a record of 58–26, making the playoffs four times. The defense ranked in the top five of the league three times.

After spending one year with the Baltimore Colts, Hawkins moved on to the New York Giants, where he was linebackers coach and defensive coordinator from 1979 to 1980, before being fired on January 6, 1981.

From the Giants, Hawkins went to coach for the Buffalo Bills under head coach Chuck Knox and followed him to the Seattle Seahawks. Hawkins coached the secondary from 1983 to 88, during which time his unit was one of the best in the league. In 1983, the Seahawks entered the playoffs as a wildcard team and advanced to the conference championship game, losing to the eventual Super Bowl champion Los Angeles Raiders. The 1984 team finished with a 12–4 record, losing in the divisional playoffs to the Miami Dolphins. The 1984 Seahawks' secondary led the league with 38 interceptions The Seahawks intercepted 149 passes during Hawkins' six years in Seattle, second only to the San Francisco 49ers. Hawkins contributed to Seahawk teams that had a combined record of 57–38 from 1983 to 1988, including four playoff appearances and an AFC West Division title in 1988.

Hawkins coached one season as defensive coordinator for the New York Jets in 1989, then spent the remainder of his career as a scout. He scouted for the Arizona Cardinals (1991–93), the Carolina Panthers (1994–97), the Indianapolis Colts (1998–99) and the Houston Texans (2000–02).

== Death ==
A resident of Fenwick Island, Delaware, Hawkins died September 9, 2004, in Berlin, Maryland. He suffered from Pick's Disease, a neurological disorder that causes frontotemporal dementia.
