= Darrell Dess =

American football player (born 1935)

No. 72, 62
- Positions: Guard, tackle

Personal information
- Born: July 11, 1935 (age 91); New Castle, Pennsylvania, U.S.
- Listed height: 6 ft 0 in (1.83 m)
- Listed weight: 243 lb (110 kg)

Career information
- High school: Union (New Castle)
- College: NC State (1954–1957)
- NFL draft: 1958: 11th round, 126th overall pick

Career history
- Pittsburgh Steelers (1958); New York Giants (1959–1964); Washington Redskins (1965–1966); New York Giants (1966–1969)

Awards and highlights
- Second-team All-Pro (1963); 2× Pro Bowl (1962, 1963); 92nd greatest New York Giant of all-time; Second-team All-ACC (1957)

Career NFL statistics
- Games played: 146
- Games started: 106
- Fumble recoveries: 1
- Touchdowns: 1
- Stats at Pro Football Reference

Darrell Charles Dess (born July 11, 1935) is an American former professional football player who was an offensive lineman in the National Football League (NFL) for the Pittsburgh Steelers, New York Giants, and the Washington Redskins.

Dess was born in New Castle, Pennsylvania. He played college football for the NC State Wolfpack, earning all-conference honors as a guard. He was selected in the eleventh round of the 1958 NFL draft by the Redskins.
