= 1957 Wake Forest Demon Deacons football team =

American college football season

1957 Wake Forest Demon Deacons football
- Conference: Atlantic Coast Conference
- Record: 0–10 (0–7 ACC)
- Head coach: Paul Amen (2nd season)
- Captains: Eddie Moore; George Johnson
- Home stadium: Bowman Gray Stadium

1957 Atlantic Coast Conference football standings
	Conf.					Overall
Team	W		L		T	W		L		T
No. 15 NC State $	5	–	0	–	1	7	–	1	–	2
No. 16 Duke	5	–	1	–	1	6	–	3	–	2
Clemson	4	–	3	–	0	7	–	3	–	0
North Carolina	4	–	3	–	0	7	–	3	–	0
Maryland	4	–	3	–	0	5	–	5	–	0
Virginia	2	–	4	–	0	3	–	6	–	1
South Carolina	2	–	5	–	0	5	–	5	–	0
Wake Forest	0	–	7	–	0	0	–	10	–	0
$ – Conference champion; Rankings from AP poll

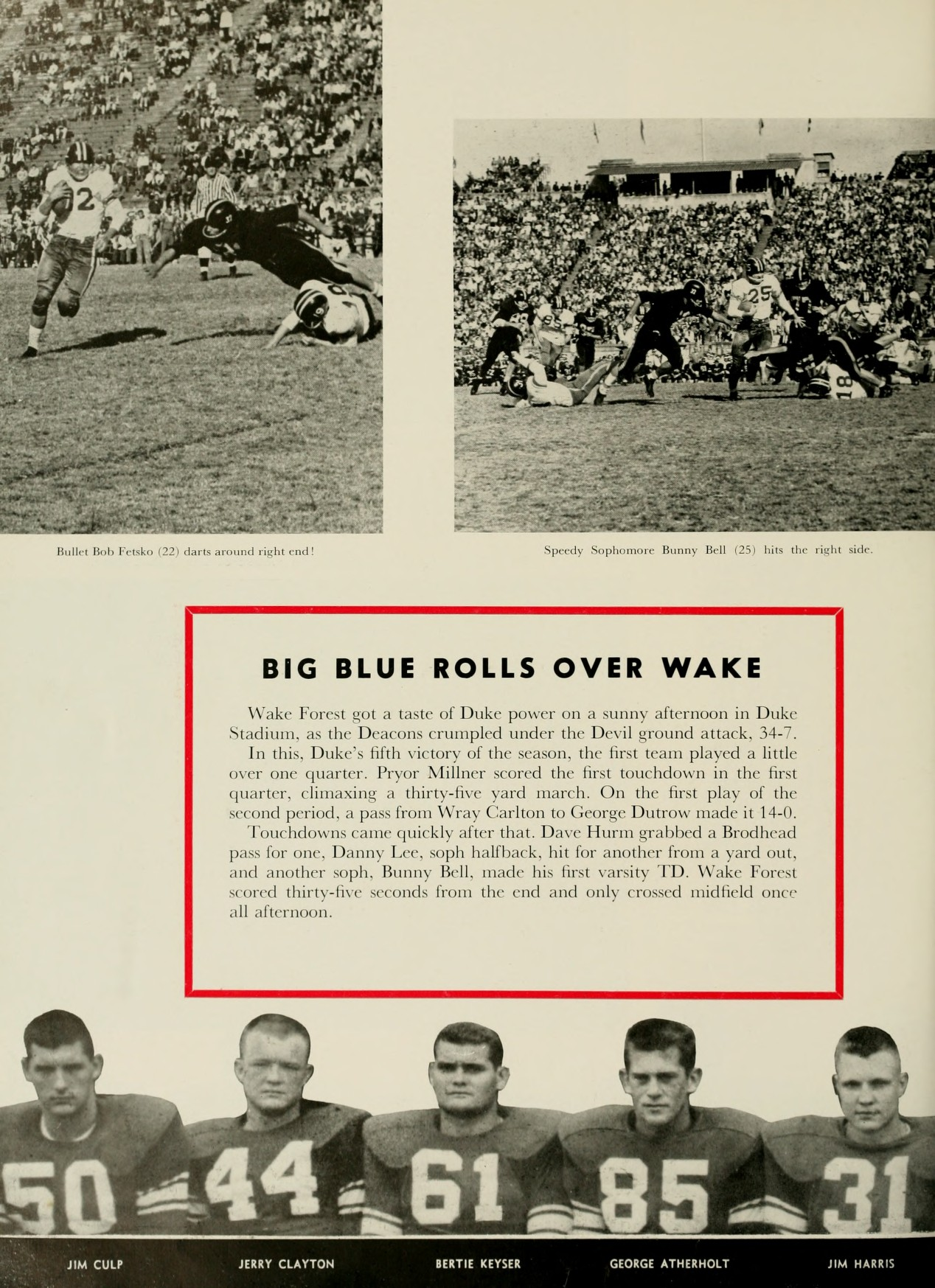
Wake Forest football team

The 1957 Wake Forest Demon Deacons football team was an American football team that represented Wake Forest University during the 1957 college football season. In their second season under head coach Paul Amen, the Demon Deacons compiled a 0–10 record and finished in last place in the Atlantic Coast Conference.

== Schedule ==
Date	Time	Opponent	Site	Result	Attendance	Source
September 28		at Florida*	Florida Field; Gainesville, FL	L 0–27	28,000	
October 5		Virginia	Bowman Gray Stadium; Winston-Salem, NC	L 20–28	10,000	
October 12		at Maryland	Bryd Stadium; College Park, MD	L 0–27	16,000	
October 19		at No. 5 Duke	Duke Stadium; Durham, NC (rivalry)	L 7–34	17,600	
October 26		North Carolina	Bowman Gray Stadium; Winston-Salem, NC (rivalry)	L 7–14	15,000	
November 2		at No. 10 NC State	Riddick Stadium; Raleigh, NC (rivalry)	L 0–19	10,000	
November 9	2:00 p.m.	VPI*	Bowman Gray Stadium; Winston-Salem, NC	L 3–10	5,500	
November 16		West Virginia*	Bowman Gray Stadium; Winston-Salem, NC	L 14–27	5,000	
November 23		at Clemson	Memorial Stadium; Clemson, SC	L 6–13	18,000	
November 30		South Carolina	Bowman Gray Stadium; Winston-Salem, NC	L 7–26	3,000	
*Non-conference game; Rankings from AP Poll released prior to the game

== Team leaders ==
Category	Team Leader	Att/Cth	Yds
Passing	Jim Dalrymple	21/61	261
Rushing	Neil MacLean	108	542
Receiving	Aubrey Currie	9	97
