= Wayne Haensel =

American football player and coach (1936–2012)

Biographical details
- Born: May 21, 1936; Walnut Grove, Minnesota, U.S.
- Died: November 12, 2012 (aged 76); Brookings, South Dakota, U.S.

Playing career
- 1954–1957: South Dakota State
- Position: Tackle

Coaching career (HC unless noted)
- 1962: Beresford HS (SD)
- 1963–1972: Mitchell HS (SD)
- 1973: Sioux City North HS (IA)
- 1974–1981: South Dakota State (assistant)
- 1982–1990: South Dakota State

Head coaching record
- Overall: 45–52 (college)

Wayne Haensel (May 21, 1936 – November 22, 2012) was an American football player and coach. He served as the head football coach at South Dakota State University in Brookings, South Dakota from 1982 to 1990, compiling a record of 45–52. Haensal was selected in the 25th round by the New York Giants in the 1958 NFL draft and participated in off-season tryouts with the Saskatchewan Roughriders of the Canadian Football League (NFL).

== Head coaching record ==
=== College ===
Year	Team	Overall	Conference	Standing	Bowl/playoffs
South Dakota State Jackrabbits (North Central Conference) (1982–1990)
1982	South Dakota State	4–6	2–4–1	6th	
1983	South Dakota State	5–6	3–6	T–8th	
1984	South Dakota State	3–8	2–7	T–8th	
1985	South Dakota State	7–4	7–2	T–2nd	
1986	South Dakota State	6–5	5–4	5th	
1987	South Dakota State	5–5	4–5	7th	
1988	South Dakota State	7–4	6–3	T–2nd	
1989	South Dakota State	5–6	3–6	8th	
1990	South Dakota State	3–8	2–7	9th	
South Dakota State:		45–52	34–44–1		
Total:		45–52			
