= 1957 Virginia Cavaliers football team =

American college football season

1957 Virginia Cavaliers football
- Conference: Atlantic Coast Conference
- Record: 3–6–1 (2–4 ACC)
- Head coach: Ben Martin (2nd season)
- Captain: Jim Bakhtiar
- Home stadium: Scott Stadium

1957 Atlantic Coast Conference football standings
	Conf.					Overall
Team	W		L		T	W		L		T
No. 15 NC State $	5	–	0	–	1	7	–	1	–	2
No. 16 Duke	5	–	1	–	1	6	–	3	–	2
Clemson	4	–	3	–	0	7	–	3	–	0
North Carolina	4	–	3	–	0	7	–	3	–	0
Maryland	4	–	3	–	0	5	–	5	–	0
Virginia	2	–	4	–	0	3	–	6	–	1
South Carolina	2	–	5	–	0	5	–	5	–	0
Wake Forest	0	–	7	–	0	0	–	10	–	0
$ – Conference champion; Rankings from AP poll

The 1957 Virginia Cavaliers football team represented the University of Virginia during the 1957 college football season. The Cavaliers were led by second-year head coach Ben Martin and played their home games at Scott Stadium in Charlottesville, Virginia. They competed as members of the Atlantic Coast Conference, finishing in sixth. At the conclusion of the season, Martin resigned as head coach to accept the head coaching position at the United States Air Force Academy.

== Schedule ==
Date	Opponent	Site	Result	Attendance	Source
September 21	at West Virginia*	Mountaineer Field; Morgantown, WV	T 6–6	23,000	
September 28	at No. 7 Duke	Duke Stadium; Durham, NC	L 0–40	14,000	
October 5	at Wake Forest	Bowman Gray Stadium; Winston-Salem, NC	W 28–20	10,000	
October 12	Clemson^{†}	Scott Stadium; Charlottesville, VA	L 6–20	18,000	
October 19	vs. VPI*	City Stadium; Richmond, VA (Tobacco Bowl, rivalry)	W 38–7	23,442	
October 26	No. 9 Army*	Scott Stadium; Charlottesville, VA	L 12–20	24,000–25,000	
November 2	VMI*	Scott Stadium; Charlottesville, VA	L 7–20	21,000	
November 16	South Carolina	Scott Stadium; Charlottesville, VA	L 0–13	12,000	
November 23	at Maryland	Byrd Stadium; College Park, MD (rivalry)	L 0–12	10,500	
November 30	at North Carolina	Kenan Memorial Stadium; Chapel Hill, NC (South's Oldest Rivalry)	W 20–13	15,000	
*Non-conference game; ^{†}Homecoming; Rankings from AP Poll released prior to the game
