= Gene Alderton =

American football player and coach (1934–1992)

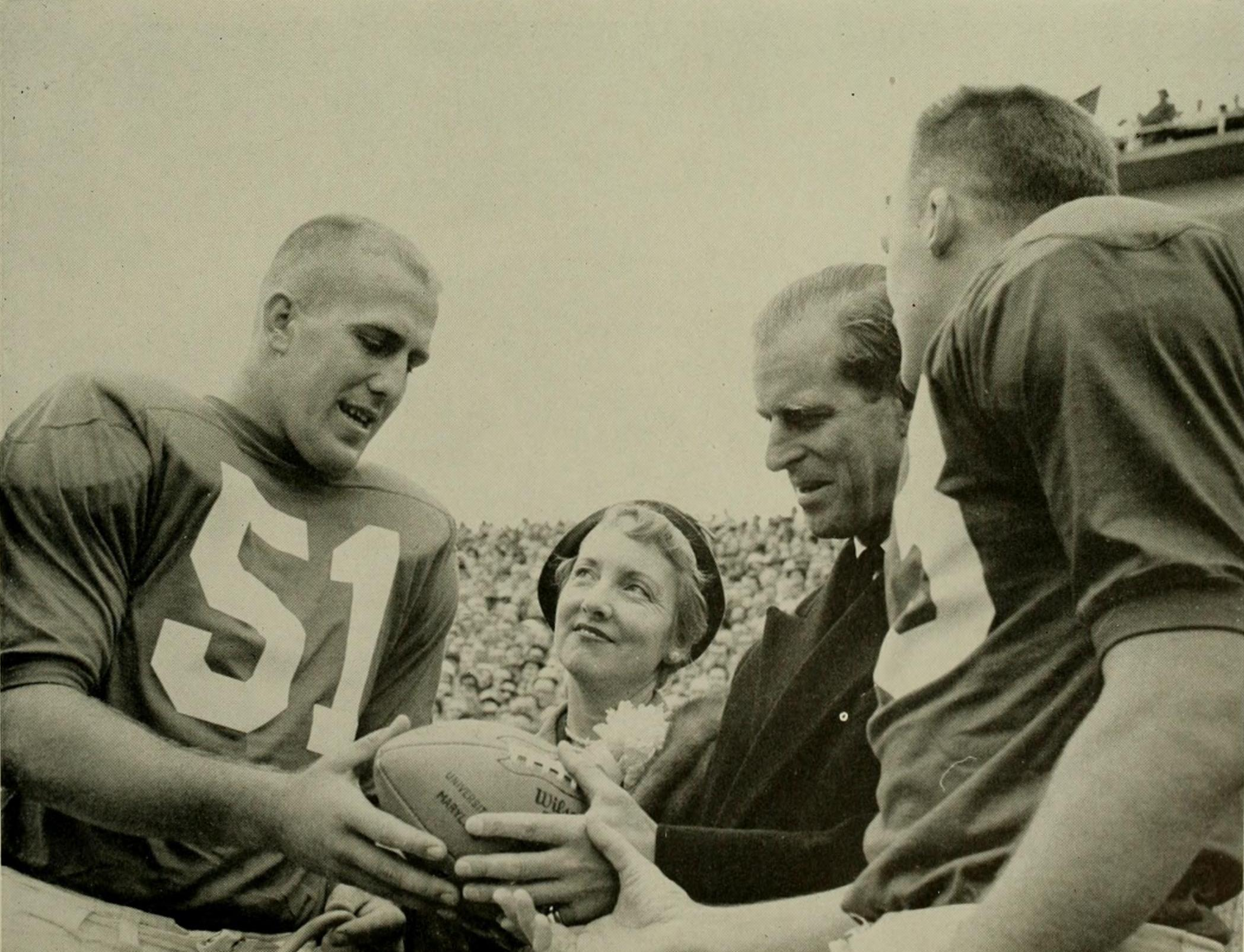
- Alderton (left) presents Prince Philip an autographed football on October 17, 1957.

Profile
- Position: Center

Personal information
- Born: April 3, 1934; Cumberland, Maryland, U.S.
- Died: July 2, 1992 (aged 58); Hyattsville, Maryland, U.S.

Career information
- College: Maryland (1955–1957)
- NFL draft: 1957: 15th round, 179 by the Detroit Lionsth overall pick

Career history

Playing
- Detroit Lions (1958)

Coaching
- Maryland (freshman coach) (1958)

Awards and highlights
- First-team All-ACC (1956); Second-team All-ACC (1957)

Wayne Eugene Alderton (April 3, 1934 – July 2, 1992) was an American football player. He played college football for the University of Maryland. He was selected by the Detroit Lions of the National Football League in the 1957 NFL draft.

== College career ==
A native of Cumberland, Maryland, Alderton attended college at the University of Maryland, where he played as a center on the football team. As a sophomore in 1955, he was pressed into service to replace injured starting center Bob Pellegrini. In 1956, he was an honorable mention Associated Press All-American. The Associated Press also named him to its All-Atlantic Coast Conference first-team.

As a senior in 1957, he served as the team co-captain alongside Jack Healy. That season, Maryland played North Carolina in the "Queen's Game"—the first American football game attended by Queen Elizabeth II. Alderton was scheduled to meet the Queen in the pre-game ceremonies. After he lost a tooth in the previous week's game, "university officials speedily ordered up a replacement so he could smile properly when he and the other co-captains were introduced to Elizabeth and Philip". Alderton presented a souvenir football to the Queen and Prince Philip alongside fellow co-captain Jack Healy before the game. The Newspaper Enterprise Association named him an honorable mention All-American. The Atlantic Coast Conference selected him as a member of its All-ACC second-team.

Head coach Tommy Mont recommended Alderton, alongside back-up center Wilbur Main, for selection to the South squad in the all-star Shrine Game to Miami coach Andy Gustafson. Upon the conclusion of his collegiate playing career, Alderton received the Teke Trophy for service by a football player over four years. He graduated from Maryland in 1958 with a Bachelor of Science degree in education for industry.

== After college ==
Alderton was selected 179th overall in the 15th round of the 1957 NFL draft by the Detroit Lions. In the summer of 1958, he was competing for a position at the Lions' training camp, and considered to have a good chance at making the roster. He played for Detroit, the defending NFL champions, in the 1958 College All-Star Game.

In mid-August, he was hired as the freshman team coach at his alma mater. In 1964, Alderton was elected to the board of trustees of the University of Maryland M Club, an athletic alumni organization. He died on July 2, 1992, while living in Hyattsville, Maryland.
