= 1958 NFL draft =

National Football League Draft

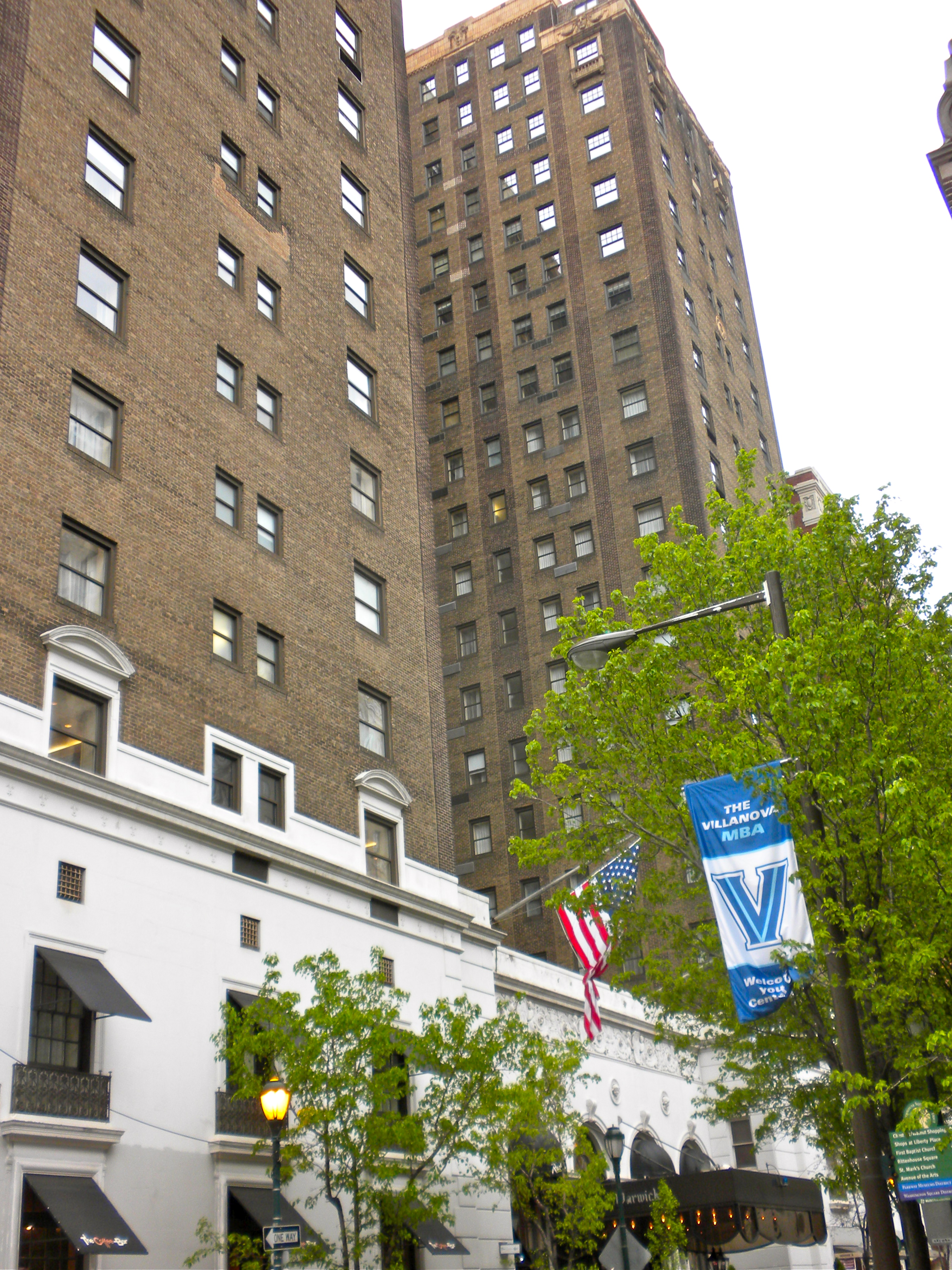
- The Warwick (location of the draft), photographed in 2010

General information
- Dates: December 2, 1957 & January 28, 1958
- Location: Warwick Hotel in Philadelphia, Pennsylvania

Overview
- 360 total selections in 30 rounds
- League: NFL
- First selection: King Hill, QB; Chicago Cardinals
- Mr. Irrelevant: Tommy Bronson, B Detroit Lions
- Most selections (34): Los Angeles Rams
- Fewest selections (23): Pittsburgh Steelers
- Hall of Famers: 7: LB Chuck Howley; DT Alex Karras; FB Jim Taylor; LB Ray Nitschke; G Jerry Kramer; HB Bobby Mitchell; OT John Madden

The 1958 NFL draft had its first four rounds held on December 2, 1957, and its final twenty-six rounds on January 28, 1958. Both sessions were held at the Warwick Hotel in Philadelphia.

This was the 12th and final year in which the first overall pick was a "lottery bonus". The Chicago Cardinals were automatically awarded the pick because it was the only team left that had not won the draft lottery yet. The Cardinals used the first pick to select quarterback King Hill.

== Player selections ==
= Pro Bowler	= Hall of Famer

=== Round 1 ===
Pick #	NFL team	Player	Position	College
1	Chicago Cardinals ^{(lottery bonus pick)}	King Hill	Quarterback	Rice
2	Chicago Cardinals	John David Crow	Halfback	Texas A&M
3	Green Bay Packers	Dan Currie	Center	Michigan State
4	Los Angeles Rams	Lou Michaels	Defensive tackle	Kentucky
5	Los Angeles Rams	Jim "Red" Phillips	Wide receiver	Auburn
6	Philadelphia Eagles	Walt Kowalczyk	Fullback	Michigan State
7	Chicago Bears	Chuck Howley	Guard	West Virginia
8	San Francisco 49ers	Jim Pace	Halfback	Michigan
9	San Francisco 49ers	Charlie Krueger	Defensive tackle	Texas A&M
10	Detroit Lions	Alex Karras	Defensive tackle	Iowa
11	Baltimore Colts	Lenny Lyles	Halfback	Louisville
12	New York Giants	Phil King	Fullback	Vanderbilt
13	Cleveland Browns	Jim Shofner	Defensive back	Texas Christian

=== Round 2 ===
Pick #	NFL team	Player	Position	College
14	Chicago Cardinals	Jim McCusker	Tackle	Pittsburgh
15	Green Bay Packers	Jim Taylor	Fullback	LSU
16	Washington Redskins	Mike Sommer	Back	George Washington
17	Philadelphia Eagles	Proverb Jacobs	Tackle	California
18	Chicago Bears	Willard Dewveall	Wide receiver	Southern Methodist
19	Los Angeles Rams	Clendon Thomas	Back	Oklahoma
20	Pittsburgh Steelers	Larry Krutko	Back	West Virginia
21	Chicago Cardinals	Bobby Jack Oliver	Tackle	Baylor
22	San Francisco 49ers	Bob Newman	Back	Washington State
23	New York Giants	Frank Youso	Tackle	Minnesota
24	Baltimore Colts	Bob Stransky	Back	Colorado
25	Cleveland Browns	Charley Mitchell	Guard	Florida

=== Round 3 ===
Pick #	NFL team	Player	Position	College
26	Chicago Cardinals	Larry Cowart	Center	Baylor
27	Green Bay Packers	Dick Christy	Back	North Carolina State
28	Washington Redskins	Stan Flowers	Back	Georgia Tech
29	Chicago Bears	Ed Cooke	End	Maryland
30	Los Angeles Rams	Jim Jones	Back	Washington
31	Washington Redskins	Bill Anderson	Back	Tennessee
32	Pittsburgh Steelers	Bill Krisher	Guard	Oklahoma
33	San Francisco 49ers	Bobby Hoppe	Back	Auburn
34	Cleveland Browns	Melwood "Buzz" Guy	Tackle	Duke
35	Baltimore Colts	Joe Nicely	Guard	West Virginia
36	Green Bay Packers	Ray Nitschke	Linebacker	Illinois
37	Chicago Bears	Don Healy	Tackle	Maryland

=== Round 4 ===
Pick #	NFL team	Player	Position	College
38	Los Angeles Rams	Urban Henry	Tackle	Georgia Tech
39	Green Bay Packers	Jerry Kramer	Guard	Idaho
40	Washington Redskins	Dan Nolan	Quarterback	Lehigh
41	Los Angeles Rams	John Guzik	Guard	Pittsburgh
42	Chicago Bears	Erich Barnes	Defensive back	Purdue
43	Philadelphia Eagles	Frank Rigney	Tackle	Iowa
44	Los Angeles Rams	Frank Woidzik	Tackle	Buffalo
45	Detroit Lions	Wayne Walker	Center	Idaho
46	San Francisco 49ers	John Varone	Back	Miami (FL)
47	New York Giants	Donnie Caraway	Back	Houston
48	Baltimore Colts	Les Walters	End	Penn State
49	Cleveland Browns	Jim Ninowski	Quarterback	Michigan State

=== Round 5 ===
Pick #	NFL team	Player	Position	College
50	Baltimore Colts	Ray Brown	Back	Mississippi
51	Green Bay Packers	Joe Francis	Back	Oregon State
52	Philadelphia Eagles	Bobby Mulgado	Back	Arizona State
53	Chicago Bears	Bob Jewett	End	Michigan State
54	Washington Redskins	Jim Van Pelt	Quarterback	Michigan
55	Los Angeles Rams	Frank Ryan	Quarterback	Rice
56	Los Angeles Rams	John Baker Jr.	Tackle	North Carolina Central
57	New York Giants	Dick Day	Tackle	Washington
58	New York Giants	Bobby Joe Conrad	Back	Texas A&M
59	San Francisco 49ers	Billy Atkins	Back	Auburn
60	Cleveland Browns	Farrell Funston	End	Pacific
61	Cleveland Browns	Jim Gibbons	End	Iowa

=== Round 6 ===
Pick #	NFL team	Player	Position	College
62	Green Bay Packers	Ken Gray	Tackle	Howard Payne
63	Chicago Cardinals	Bobby Gordon	Back	Tennessee
64	Philadelphia Eagles	John Kersey	Tackle	Duke
65	Chicago Bears	Merrill Douglas	Back	Utah
66	Washington Redskins	Dick Lynch	Back	Notre Dame
67	Los Angeles Rams	Floyd Iglehart	Back	Wiley
68	Pittsburgh Steelers	Dick Lasse	End	Syracuse
69	Baltimore Colts	Bob Taylor	End	Vanderbilt
70	New York Giants	Billy Lott	Back	Mississippi
71	San Francisco 49ers	Henry Schmidt	Tackle	USC
72	Cleveland Browns	Jim Wulff	Back	Michigan State
73	Detroit Lions	Danny Lewis	Back	Wisconsin

=== Round 7 ===
Pick #	NFL team	Player	Position	College
74	Chicago Cardinals	Jon Jelacic	End	Minnesota
75	Green Bay Packers	Doug Maison	Back	Hillsdale
76	Philadelphia Eagles	Len Mansfield	Tackle	Pittsburg State
77	Chicago Bears	Gene Bentley	Back	Texas Tech
78	Washington Redskins	Leon Bennett	Tackle	Boston College
79	Baltimore Colts	Johnny Sample	Defensive back	Maryland-Eastern Shore
80	Los Angeles Rams	Bill Jobko	Guard	Ohio State
81	New York Giants	Vernon Vaughn	End	Maryland-Eastern Shore
82	Baltimore Colts	John Diehl	Tackle	Virginia
83	Detroit Lions	Ralph Pfeifer	Back	Kansas State
84	Cleveland Browns	Bobby Mitchell	Halfback	Illinois
85	Detroit Lions	Hal Outten	Tackle	Virginia

=== Round 8 ===
Pick #	NFL team	Player	Position	College
86	Green Bay Packers	Mike Bill	Center	Syracuse
87	San Francisco 49ers	Leon Burton	Back	Arizona State
88	Philadelphia Eagles	Bill Striegel	Linebacker	Pacific
89	Chicago Bears	Ed Rutsch	Tackle	George Washington
90	Washington Redskins	Buddy Payne	End	North Carolina
91	Los Angeles Rams	Bobby Marks	Back	Texas A&M
92	Detroit Lions	Karl Koepfer	Guard	Bowling Green
93	Baltimore Colts	Floyd Peters	Guard	Cal State-San Francisco
94	New York Giants	Don Sutherin	Back	Ohio State
95	San Francisco 49ers	Ron Mills	Back	West Texas State
96	Cleveland Browns	Bert Lattimore	End	Duke
97	Detroit Lions	Phil Blazer	Tackle	North Carolina

=== Round 9 ===
Pick #	NFL team	Player	Position	College
98	Chicago Cardinals	John Keelan	Tackle	Kansas State
99	Green Bay Packers	Norm Jarock	Back	St. Norbert
100	Pittsburgh Steelers	Mike Henry	Tackle	USC
101	Chicago Bears	Ralph Anderson	End	Cal State-Los Angeles
102	Washington Redskins	Frank Kuchta	Center	Notre Dame
103	Detroit Lions	Jim Loftin	Back	Alabama
104	Los Angeles Rams	Gene Selawski	Tackle	Purdue
105	New York Giants	Ron Kissell	Tackle	Pittsburgh
106	Baltimore Colts	Hal Bullard	Back	Lenoir-Rhyne
107	San Francisco 49ers	George Troutman	Tackle	Capital
108	Cleveland Browns	Bernie Parrish	Back	Florida
109	Detroit Lions	Ben Paolucci	Tackle	Wayne State

=== Round 10 ===
Pick #	NFL team	Player	Position	College
110	Green Bay Packers	Carl Johnson	Tackle	Illinois
111	Chicago Cardinals	Gil Robertshaw	Tackle	Brown
112	Philadelphia Eagles	Theron Sapp	Back	Georgia
113	Chicago Bears	Aubrey Lewis	Back	Notre Dame
114	Washington Redskins	Ben Preston	Tackle	Auburn
115	Los Angeles Rams	Al Jacks	Quarterback	Penn State
116	Pittsburgh Steelers	Dick Campbell	Center	Marquette
117	Baltimore Colts	Ray Schamber	End	South Dakota
118	New York Giants	Herb Drummond	Back	Central State (OH)
119	San Francisco 49ers	Vel Heckman	Tackle	Florida
120	Cleveland Browns	Leo Russavage	Tackle	North Carolina
121	Detroit Lions	Elliot Schaubach	Tackle	William & Mary

=== Round 11 ===
Pick #	NFL team	Player	Position	College
122	Chicago Cardinals	Dean Philpott	Back	Fresno State
123	Green Bay Packers	Harry Horton	End	Wichita State
124	Philadelphia Eagles	Mel Dillard	Back	Purdue
125	Chicago Bears	Rocco Cinelli	Tackle	Wisconsin
126	Washington Redskins	Darrell Dess	Tackle	North Carolina State
127	Pittsburgh Steelers	Larry Aldrich	End	Idaho
128	Los Angeles Rams	Gerry Schweitzer	End	Pacific
129	New York Giants	Sid Williams	Back	Wisconsin
130	Baltimore Colts	Bobby Jordan	Back	VMI
131	San Francisco 49ers	Hogan Wharton	Tackle	Houston
132	Cleveland Browns	Russ Bowermaster	End	Ohio State
133	Detroit Lions	Claude Chaney	Back	Dayton

=== Round 12 ===
Pick #	NFL team	Player	Position	College
134	Green Bay Packers	Wayne Miller	End	Baylor
135	Chicago Cardinals	Bill Hinton	Guard	Louisiana Tech
136	Philadelphia Eagles	Jack Crabtree	Back	Oregon
137	Chicago Bears	Johnny Morris	Back	California-Santa Barbara
138	Washington Redskins	Eddie Michaels	Guard	Villanova
139	Los Angeles Rams	Ron Clairborne	Tackle	Kansas
140	Pittsburgh Steelers	Leroy Reed	Back	Mississippi
141	Baltimore Colts	Tom Addison	Guard	South Carolina
142	New York Giants	Gerry Hershey	Tackle	Syracuse
143	San Francisco 49ers	Pete Williams	Tackle	Lehigh
144	Cleveland Browns	Bob Brodhead	Quarterback	Duke
145	Detroit Lions	Hal Boutte	End	San Jose State

=== Round 13 ===
Pick #	NFL team	Player	Position	College
146	Chicago Cardinals	Charlie Jackson	Back	Southern Methodist
147	Green Bay Packers	Gene Cook	End	Toledo
148	Philadelphia Eagles	Mickey Trimarki	Quarterback	West Virginia
149	New York Giants	George Kurker	Tackle	Tufts
150	Washington Redskins	Ken "Model A" Ford	Quarterback	Hardin–Simmons
151	San Francisco 49ers	Jim Yore	Back	Indiana
152	Los Angeles Rams	Tony Kolodziej	End	Michigan State
153	Green Bay Packers	Don Herndon	Back	Tampa
154	Baltimore Colts	Jerry Richardson	End	Wofford
155	San Francisco 49ers	Hal Dukes	End	Michigan State
156	Cleveland Browns	Hal Williams	Back	Miami (OH)
157	Detroit Lions	Barry Maroney	Back	Cincinnati

=== Round 14 ===
Pick #	NFL team	Player	Position	College
158	Green Bay Packers	Harry Hauffe	Tackle	South Dakota
159	Chicago Cardinals	Bob Schmidt	Tackle	Minnesota
160	Philadelphia Eagles	Bill Lapham	Center	Iowa
161	Chicago Bears	Bill Melnik	Tackle	Army
162	Washington Redskins	Jack Farls	End	Penn State
163	Los Angeles Rams	Bill Mason	Back	UCLA
164	Pittsburgh Steelers	Doyle Jennings	Tackle	Oklahoma
165	Baltimore Colts	Ken Hall	Back	Texas A&M
166	New York Giants	C.R. Roberts	Back	USC
167	San Francisco 49ers	Max Fields	Back	Whittier
168	Cleveland Browns	Ken Miller	Tackle	Texas Christian
169	Detroit Lions	Ken Webb	Back	Presbyterian

=== Round 15 ===
Pick #	NFL team	Player	Position	College
170	Chicago Cardinals	Ray Dunlap	Back	Marshall
171	Green Bay Packers	Tom Newell	Back	Drake
172	Philadelphia Eagles	Stan Hinos	Tackle	Mississippi Valley State
173	Chicago Bears	Jim Harryman	Back	Compton J.C.
174	Washington Redskins	Jack Davis	Guard	Arizona
175	Pittsburgh Steelers	Ed Sears	Back	Florida
176	Los Angeles Rams	Dick Johnston	Center	Southern Mississippi
177	New York Giants	Norm Sixta	Tackle	Minnesota
178	Baltimore Colts	Les Carney	Back	Ohio
179	Detroit Lions	John Scheldrup	End	Iowa State
180	Cleveland Browns	Howard Hoelscher	Back	Rice
181	Detroit Lions	Jerry Mohlman	Back	Benedictine

=== Round 16 ===
Pick #	NFL team	Player	Position	College
182	Green Bay Packers	Arley Finley	Tackle	Georgia Tech
183	Chicago Cardinals	Wade Patterson	End	Idaho
184	Philadelphia Eagles	Mike Meatheringham	Tackle	Georgia
185	Chicago Bears	Ken Pleger	Tackle	Capital
186	Washington Redskins	Fred Polzer	End	Virginia
187	Los Angeles Rams	Clint Westemeyer	End	St. Ambrose
188	Pittsburgh Steelers	John Perkins	Tackle	Southern Mississippi
189	Baltimore Colts	Archie Matsos	Guard	Michigan State
190	New York Giants	John West	Tackle	Mississippi
191	San Francisco 49ers	George Shirkey	Tackle	Stephen F. Austin
192	Cleveland Browns	Jerry Cornelison	Tackle	Southern Methodist
193	Detroit Lions	Gordon Ringquist	Tackle	Central Michigan

=== Round 17 ===
Pick #	NFL team	Player	Position	College
194	Chicago Cardinals	Mac Starnes	Center	Abilene Christian
195	Green Bay Packers	Joe Reese	End	Arkansas Tech
196	Philadelphia Eagles	Bill Van Buren	Center	Iowa
197	Chicago Bears	Dick Eaton	Center	Richmond
198	Washington Redskins	Fred Wilt	Tackle	Richmond
199	Pittsburgh Steelers	Joe Lewis	Tackle	Compton J.C.
200	Los Angeles Rams	Bill Thomas	Center	Clemson
201	New York Giants	Jack Harrison	Center	Duke
202	Baltimore Colts	Jim Reese	Back	Minnesota
203	San Francisco 49ers	John Wittenborn	Tackle	Southeast Missouri State
204	Cleveland Browns	Roddy Osborne	Back	Texas A&M
205	Detroit Lions	Walt Gurasich	Guard	USC

=== Round 18 ===
Pick #	NFL team	Player	Position	College
206	Green Bay Packers	Chuck Strid	Guard	Syracuse
207	Chicago Cardinals	Mario Cheppo	End	Louisville
208	Philadelphia Eagles	John Burroughs	Tackle	Iowa
209	Chicago Bears	Phil Dupler	Back	Duke
210	Washington Redskins	Lennie King	Back	Connecticut
211	Los Angeles Rams	Coy Scott	Tackle	McNeese State
212	Detroit Lions	Bill Austin	Center	Auburn
213	Baltimore Colts	Dave Lloyd	Center	Georgia
214	New York Giants	Dick Fusco	Tackle	Middlebury
215	San Francisco 49ers	Dennit Morris	Back	Oklahoma
216	Cleveland Browns	Alvin Johnson	Tackle	Idaho
217	Detroit Lions	Larry Carrier	Back	Kansas

=== Round 19 ===
Pick #	NFL team	Player	Position	College
218	Chicago Cardinals	Ulmo "Sonny" Randle	Back	Virginia
219	Chicago Bears	Bill Roehnelt	Guard	Bradley
220	Philadelphia Eagles	Ron Sabal	Guard	Purdue
221	Chicago Bears	Bill Chancey	End	West Virginia
222	Washington Redskins	Don Stephenson	Center	Georgia Tech
223	Pittsburgh Steelers	Gene Keady	Back	Kansas State
224	Los Angeles Rams	Dick Dorsey	End	USC
225	New York Giants	Ernie Jackson	Back	Syracuse
226	Baltimore Colts	John Murnen	Guard	Bowling Green
227	San Francisco 49ers	Rannie Mushatt	Center	Grambling
228	Cleveland Browns	Ed Brown	Guard	Arizona
229	Detroit Lions	Dave Bottos	Back	Murray State

=== Round 20 ===
Pick #	NFL team	Player	Position	College
230	Green Bay Packers	John DuBose	Back	Trinity (TX)
231	Chicago Cardinals	Jim Matheny	Center	UCLA
232	Philadelphia Eagles	Kent Lovelace	Back	Mississippi
233	Chicago Bears	Les Rutledge	Tackle	Michigan State
234	Washington Redskins	Lou Pelham	End	Florida
235	Los Angeles Rams	George Colbert	Back	Denver
236	Pittsburgh Steelers	George Johnson	Tackle	Wake Forest
237	Baltimore Colts	Tom Forrestal	Quarterback	Navy
238	New York Giants	Joe Clements	Back	Texas
239	San Francisco 49ers	Jerry Mertens	End	Drake
240	Cleveland Browns	Ed Serieka	Back	Xavier
241	Detroit Lions	Bill Curry	Tackle	Western Kentucky

=== Round 21 ===
Pick #	NFL team	Player	Position	College
242	Chicago Cardinals	Ray Toole	Back	North Texas State
243	Green Bay Packers	Jerry Kershner	Tackle	Oregon
244	Philadelphia Eagles	John Madden	Offensive tackle	Cal Poly San Luis Obispo
245	Chicago Bears	Bill Miller	Tackle	New Mexico Highlands
246	Washington Redskins	Jackie Simpson	Guard	Mississippi
247	Pittsburgh Steelers	Everett Jones	Guard	Utah
248	Los Angeles Rams	Ron Parrish	Back	Linfield
249	New York Giants	Charlie Hansen	Center	Tulane
250	Baltimore Colts	Jim Faulk	Back	Texas Christian
251	San Francisco 49ers	Don Christian	Back	Arkansas
252	Cleveland Browns	Bill Martin	End	Iowa State
253	Detroit Lions	Jim Wagstaff	Back	Idaho State

=== Round 22 ===
Pick #	NFL team	Player	Position	College
254	Green Bay Packers	Dick Maggard	Back	College of Idaho
255	Chicago Cardinals	Tony Aloisio	End	Indiana
256	Philadelphia Eagles	George Sherwood	End	St. Joseph's (IN)
257	Chicago Bears	Al Carter	Back	Tennessee
258	Washington Redskins	Charley Sanders	Back	West Texas State
259	Los Angeles Rams	Bill Steiger	End	Washington State
260	Pittsburgh Steelers	Bill Thompson	End	Duke
261	Baltimore Colts	Bob McKee	End	Monmouth
262	New York Giants	Cleve Wester	Tackle	Auburn
263	San Francisco 49ers	Bruce Hartman	Tackle	Luther
264	Green Bay Packers	Franklin Merlino	Back	Florida State
265	Detroit Lions	Buddy Nidiffer	End	South Carolina

=== Round 23 ===
Pick #	NFL team	Player	Position	College
266	Chicago Cardinals	John Harbour	Tackle	Southeast Missouri State
267	Green Bay Packers	Jack Ashton	Guard	South Carolina
268	Philadelphia Eagles	Billy Templeton	End	Mississippi
269	Chicago Bears	Ken Daw	Back	Sam Houston State
270	Washington Redskins	Ron Schomburger	End	Florida State
271	Pittsburgh Steelers	Ken Trowbridge	Back	North Carolina State
272	Los Angeles Rams	Gary Berry	Back	East Texas State
273	New York Giants	Billy Hurst	Back	Mississippi
274	Baltimore Colts	Phil Parslow	Back	UCLA
275	San Francisco 49ers	Larry Fields	Back	Utah
276	Cleveland Browns	Dan Verhey	Tackle	Washington State
277	Detroit Lions	Frank Destino	Back	South Carolina

=== Round 24 ===
Pick #	NFL team	Player	Position	College
278	Green Bay Packers	John Jereck	Tackle	Detroit
279	Chicago Cardinals	Eric Soesbe	Tackle	Vanderbilt
280	Philadelphia Eagles	Jim Padget	Center	Clemson
281	Chicago Bears	Russ Moon	Tackle	Virginia Tech
282	Washington Redskins	Rod Hanson	End	Illinois
283	Los Angeles Rams	Larry Harding	End	Michigan State
284	Pittsburgh Steelers	Norm Roberts	End	East Texas State
285	Baltimore Colts	Bobby Sandlin	Back	Tennessee
286	New York Giants	Max Brod	Back	Texas Tech
287	San Francisco 49ers	Dee Mackey	End	East Texas State
288	Cleveland Browns	Jim O'Connor	Tackle	Marshall
289	Detroit Lions	Dave Whitsell	Back	Indiana

=== Round 25 ===
Pick #	NFL team	Player	Position	College
290	Chicago Cardinals	J.C. Riekenberg	Back	Northwestern State (LA)
291	Green Bay Packers	Larry Plenty	Back	Boston College
292	Philadelphia Eagles	Hal Divine	Tackle	Memphis State
293	Chicago Bears	Bob Barron	Center	St. Norbert
294	Washington Redskins	John Groom	Guard	Texas Christian
295	Pittsburgh Steelers	Bill Groce	Back	North Texas State
296	Los Angeles Rams	Bill Atkins	Tackle	San Jose State
297	New York Giants	Wayne Haensel	Tackle	South Dakota
298	Baltimore Colts	Jim Rountree	Back	Florida
299	San Francisco 49ers	Bill Kaczmarek	Center	Southwest Missouri State
300	Cleveland Browns	Bobby Peters	Back	Baylor
301	Detroit Lions	Jim Cook	Back	Auburn

=== Round 26 ===
Pick #	NFL team	Player	Position	College
302	Green Bay Packers	Esker Harris	Guard	UCLA
303	Chicago Cardinals	Ray Masters	Back	Southern Methodist
304	Philadelphia Eagles	Neil MacLean	Back	Wake Forest
305	Chicago Bears	Bob Lyles	Back	Memphis State
306	Washington Redskins	Frank Bloomquist	Guard	Iowa
307	Los Angeles Rams	Corky Bridges	Back	Central Washington
308	Pittsburgh Steelers	Jon Evans	End	Oklahoma State
309	Baltimore Colts	Bob Grimes	Tackle	Central Michigan
310	New York Giants	Dave Burkholder	Guard	Minnesota
311	San Francisco 49ers	Hilliard Hill	End	USC
312	Cleveland Browns	Frank Thompson	Tackle	Wake Forest
313	Detroit Lions	Joe Bruce	Tackle	Middle Tennessee State

=== Round 27 ===
Pick #	NFL team	Player	Position	College
314	Chicago Cardinals	Will Lewis	Back	Tennessee-Chattanooga
315	Green Bay Packers	Neil Habig	Center	Purdue
316	Philadelphia Eagles	Hindman Wall	End	Auburn
317	Chicago Bears	Ben Napolski	End	Northwestern
318	Washington Redskins	Perry Gehring	End	Minnesota
319	Pittsburgh Steelers	Floyd Dellinger	Back	Texas Tech
320	Los Angeles Rams	Alonzo Vereen	Back	Florida A&M
321	New York Giants	Dick Bronson	Tackle	USC
322	Baltimore Colts	George Dintiman	Back	Lock Haven
323	San Francisco 49ers	Bob Witucki	End	Texas Tech
324	Cleveland Browns	Dave Thelen	Back	Miami (OH)
325	Detroit Lions	Don Agers	Tackle	Missouri-Rolla

=== Round 28 ===
Pick #	NFL team	Player	Position	College
326	Green Bay Packers	Dave Crowell	Guard	Washington State
327	Chicago Cardinals	Gale McGinty	Back	West Texas State
328	Philadelphia Eagles	Gene Gossage	Tackle	Northwestern
329	Chicago Bears	Wilbur Main	Back	Maryland
330	Washington Redskins	Joe Biggs	Guard	Hardin–Simmons
331	Los Angeles Rams	Gordy Morrow	End	Michigan
332	Pittsburgh Steelers	Dean Akin	End	Jacksonville State
333	Baltimore Colts	Jim Murphy	Tackle	East Tennessee State
334	New York Giants	Bob Watters	End	Lincoln (MO)
335	San Francisco 49ers	Garland Warren	Center	North Texas State
336	Cleveland Browns	Bill Boykin	Tackle	Michigan State
337	Detroit Lions	Jack Pitt	End	South Carolina

=== Round 29 ===
Pick #	NFL team	Player	Position	College
338	Chicago Cardinals	Ken Irby	Tackle	Mississippi State
339	Green Bay Packers	Bob Haynes	Tackle	Sam Houston State
340	Philadelphia Eagles	Don McDonald	Back	Houston
341	Chicago Bears	Glen Hakes	Guard	New Mexico
342	Washington Redskins	Ed Coffin	Back	Syracuse
343	Pittsburgh Steelers	Mert Fuquay	End	Baylor
344	Los Angeles Rams	O'Jay Bourgeois	Back	Arizona State
345	New York Giants	Louis Pitney	Center	New Haven State
346	Baltimore Colts	Doug Padgett	End	Duke
347	San Francisco 49ers	Herman Hodges	Back	Sam Houston State
348	Cleveland Browns	Frank Czapla	Tackle	Missouri
349	Detroit Lions	Henry Herzog	Back	Kentucky

=== Round 30 ===
Pick #	NFL team	Player	Position	College
350	Green Bay Packers	John Peters	Tackle	Houston
351	Philadelphia Eagles	Jim Thompson	End	Temple
352	Chicago Bears	Bobby Halum	Back	Middle Tennessee State
353	Washington Redskins	Ted Smith	End	Georgia Tech
354	Los Angeles Rams	Walter Fondren	Back	Texas
355	Pittsburgh Steelers	Dick Scherer	End	Pittsburgh
356	Baltimore Colts	Gary Lund	Guard	Utah State
357	New York Giants	Billy Lumpkin	End	North Alabama
358	San Francisco 49ers	Ted Stahura	Tackle	Kansas State
359	Cleveland Browns	Ben Svendsen	Center	Minnesota
360	Detroit Lions	Tommy Bronson	Back	Tennessee

= Pro Bowler	= Hall of Famer

== Hall of Famers ==
- Jim Taylor, fullback from Louisiana State University taken 2nd round 15th overall by the Green Bay Packers.

Inducted: Professional Football Hall of Fame class of 1976.

- Ray Nitschke, linebacker from Illinois taken 3rd round 36th overall by the Green Bay Packers.

Inducted: Professional Football Hall of Fame class of 1978.

- Bobby Mitchell, halfback from the University of Illinois at Urbana–Champaign taken 7th round 84th overall by the Cleveland Browns.

Inducted: Professional Football Hall of Fame class of 1983.

- John Madden, offensive tackle from California Polytechnic State University taken 21st round 244th overall by the Philadelphia Eagles.

Inducted: Professional Football Hall of Fame class of 2006 as a coach.

- Jerry Kramer, guard from Idaho taken 4th round 39th overall by the Green Bay Packers.

Inducted: Professional Football Hall of Fame class of 2018.

- Alex Karras, defensive tackle from the University of Iowa taken 1st round 10th overall by the Detroit Lions.

Inducted: Professional Football Hall of Fame class of 2020.

- Chuck Howley, guard from West Virginia University taken 1st round 7th overall by the Chicago Bears.

Inducted: Professional Football Hall of Fame class of 2023.

== Notable undrafted players ==
^{†}	= Pro Bowler

Original NFL team	Player	Pos.	College	Notes
Chicago Cardinals	Ed Cook	G/T	Notre Dame	
Chicago Cardinals	Mack Reynolds	QB	LSU	
Pittsburgh Steelers	Don Bishop ^{†}	CB	LA City College	
Pittsburgh Steelers	Theodore Karras	DT	Indiana	
