= Frank Kuchta =

American football player (1936–2017)

No. 56, 52
- Positions: Center, linebacker

Personal information
- Born: September 18, 1936; Cleveland, Ohio, U.S.
- Died: November 24, 2017 (aged 81); Lyndhurst, Ohio, U.S.
- Listed height: 6 ft 2 in (1.88 m)
- Listed weight: 225 lb (102 kg)

Career information
- High school: Benedictine (Cleveland)
- College: Notre Dame (1954–1957)
- NFL draft: 1958: 9th round, 102nd overall pick

Career history
- Washington Redskins (1958–1959); Denver Broncos (1960); Calgary Stampeders (1961)*
- * Offseason or practice squad member only

Career NFL/AFL statistics
- Games played: 26
- Games started: 12
- Fumble recoveries: 1
- Stats at Pro Football Reference

Frank William Kuchta (September 18, 1936 – November 24, 2017) was an American professional football center and linebacker in the National Football League (NFL) for the Washington Redskins. He was also among the players of the inaugural Denver Broncos team in the American Football League (AFL).

He played college football at the University of Notre Dame and was drafted 102nd overall in the ninth round of the 1958 NFL draft. During his career at the University of Notre Dame he played in the historic 1957 Notre Dame vs the University of Oklahoma game where the Irish broke Oklahoma's 47-game winning streak—a streak which stands to this day. He made a crucial tackle to help win the game and was awarded AP Lineman of the Week.

After leaving the NFL, he played for a season with the Calgary Stampeders in the Canadian Football League (CFL).
