= Phil Blazer =

American football player (1936–2026)

No. 60
- Position: Guard

Personal information
- Born: February 25, 1936; Homestead, Pennsylvania, U.S.
- Died: February 8, 2026 (aged 89)
- Listed height: 6 ft 1 in (1.85 m)
- Listed weight: 235 lb (107 kg)

Career information
- College: North Carolina
- NFL draft: 1958: 8th round, 97th overall pick

Career history
- Buffalo Bills (1960)

Awards and highlights
- 2× First-team All-ACC (1957, 1958)

Career AFL statistics
- Games played: 14
- Games started: 13
- Stats at Pro Football Reference

Philip Paul Blazer (February 25, 1936 – February 8, 2026) was an American professional football player who was an offensive guard for the Buffalo Bills of the American Football League (AFL). He played college football for the North Carolina Tar Heels, and he played in the AFL for the Bills in 1960.

Blazer died on February 8, 2026, at the age of 89.

== See also ==
- List of American Football League players
