= Philadelphia Bulldogs (American football) =

- Founded: 1961
- Folded: 1967
- League: United Football League; Continental Football League
- Based in: Philadelphia, Pennsylvania
- Arena: Temple Stadium
- Championships: 2 (1964, 1966)

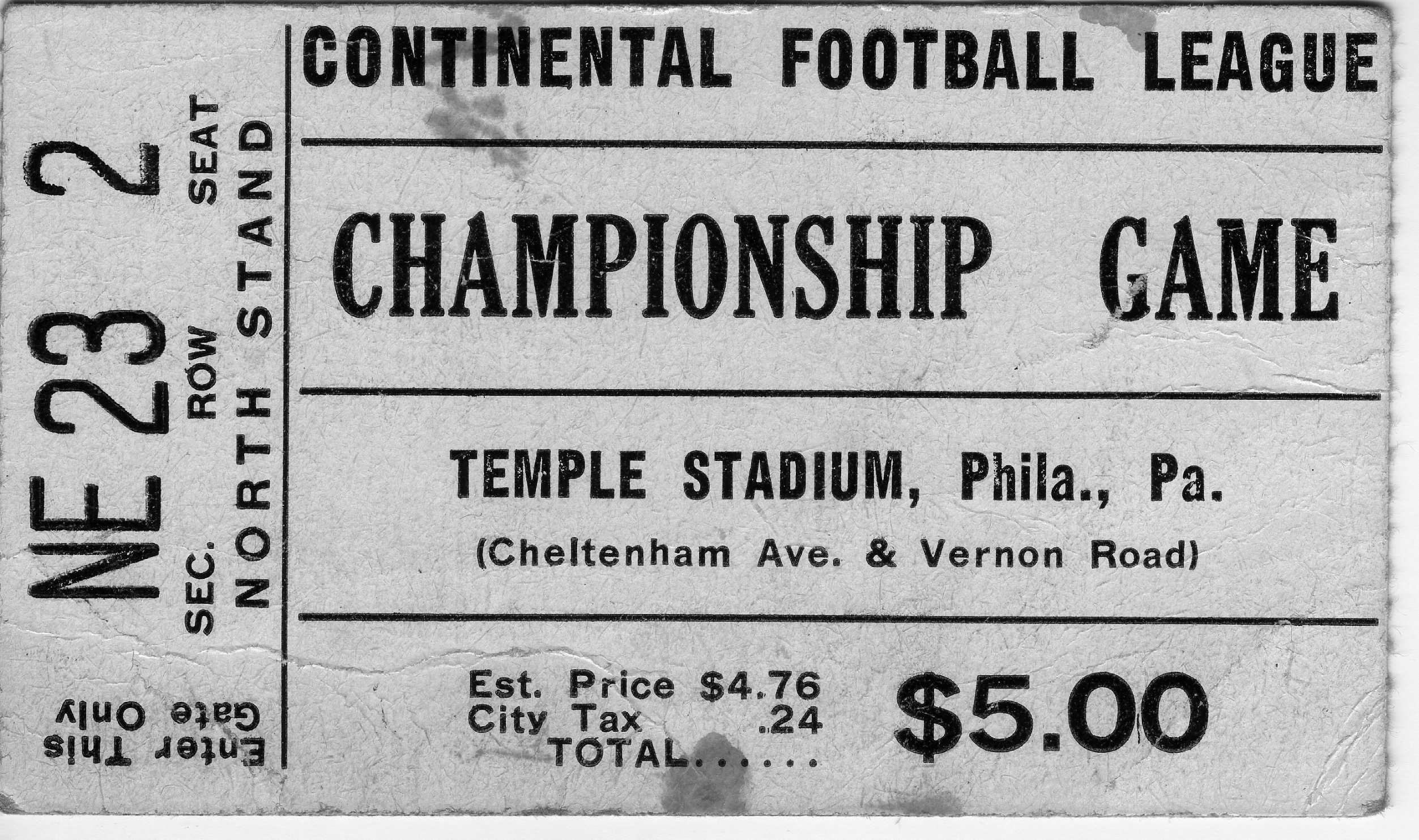
Ticket stub

The Philadelphia Bulldogs were a professional American football team based in Philadelphia, Pennsylvania that played in the Continental Football League beginning in 1965. Their regular season games were played at Temple Stadium and in December 1966 they won the league title there by a 20–17 score in overtime against the Orlando Panthers after finishing the regular season 9–5 and tied for the East Division lead with the Toronto Rifles. The winning field goal was kicked by former NFL/Canadian FL player Jamie Caleb. The team disbanded in 1967. The 1966 team was coached by Wayne Hardin, who also coached Temple University afterwards and had come to the Bulldogs from the Naval Academy. The starting quarterback throughout the team's tenure was Bob Brodhead, who was later athletic director at Louisiana State University. The Bulldogs were ranked 21st of the top 25 Philadelphia championship teams of all time in 2011.

Among the top players in their championship year were rushing back Claude Watts (who gained 488 yards rushing and 454 receiving) and receivers John Michael Drew (most receptions with 68), Dave Washington (1018 yards gained on 63 passes with 14 TDs) and H.D. Murphy (10 TDs on 57 receptions) while the defense included Bruce Puterbaugh and Tony Golmont (who had 6 interceptions). In 1966 Brodhead (who was not only the team's quarterback but business manager) completed 258 of 491 passing attempts with 27 interceptions for 3199 yards and 39 TDs; he had been the most valuable player in the United Football League before signing with the Bulldogs. In 1966, he was voted All-Star quarterback by the league's coaches. Hardin was named Coach of the Year in 1966 by the Touchdown Club of Philadelphia after the championship.

The team also signed Walter Chyzowych as a place kicker and punter, when the prior kicker, George Potts, was injured. Chyzowych was a coach for the U. S. National Men's Soccer team and various other clubs, including Philadelphia College of Textiles and Science and the Philadelphia Fever of the Major Indoor Soccer League. Steve van Buren, the Hall of Famer with the Philadelphia Eagles, was listed as an assistant coach on the team and the broadcasters for the team were the well-known Al Meltzer, on WFIL-560, and Les Keiter on Channel 6.

== History ==
The team was originally formed as the Cleveland Bulldogs in 1961 and played in the minor league United Football League. While in Cleveland the Bulldogs played their home games at Cloverleaf Speedway Stadium in Valley View, Ohio. In 1964 Cleveland's franchise rights were granted to an ownership group based out of Canton, Ohio. The Canton Bulldogs were not the same team as the Cleveland franchise but did have first option to sign any ex-Cleveland players and had exclusive rights to any prospects within 100 miles of Canton.

The 1964 Bulldogs won the UFL's Western Division and ended the season with a 19–14 win over the Indianapolis Warriors in what would be the United Football League's final season. Just days prior to the win, head coach Babe Dimancheff announced his resignation amidst reports that the team was nearly $100,000 in debt. The UFL revoked Canton's franchise on December 7 for failure to meet its financial obligations.

In December 1965 the Bulldogs franchise was purchased and transferred to Philadelphia, where it became a charter franchise in the Continental Football League. The Bulldogs played their COFL home games at Temple Stadium. The team finished in 2nd place in the COFL's Eastern Division in 1965. Dimancheff was fired as head coach after the season, and was replaced by former Navy head coach Wayne Hardin. Under Hardin the Bulldogs clinched a postseason berth and won the COFL championship. Less than six months later it was announced that the team was withdrawing from the COFL, with an eye toward possibly returning for the 1968 season based out of Tampa, Florida or Charlotte, North Carolina.

== Season-by-season ==
	Year	League	W	L	T	Finish	Coach
Cleveland Bulldogs	1961	United Football League	6	4	0	2nd, Eastern Division	Chet Mutryn
Cleveland Bulldogs	1962	United Football League	4	8	0	4th, Eastern Division	Chet Mutryn
Cleveland Bulldogs	1963	United Football League	7	5	0	2nd, Eastern Division	Chet Mutryn
Canton Bulldogs	1964	United Football League	12	2	0	1st, Western Division; UFL Champions	Babe Dimancheff
Philadelphia Bulldogs	1965	Continental Football League	10	4	0	2nd, Eastern Division	Babe Dimancheff
Philadelphia Bulldogs	1966	Continental Football League	9	5	0	2nd, Eastern Division; COFL Champions	Wayne Hardin
