= 1957 Duke Blue Devils football team =

American college football season

1957 Duke Blue Devils football

Orange Bowl, L 21–48 vs. Oklahoma
- Conference: Atlantic Coast Conference

Ranking
- Coaches: No. 14
- AP: No. 16
- Record: 6–3–2 (5–1–1 ACC)
- Head coach: William D. Murray (7th season)
- MVP: Tom Topping
- Captain: Hal McElhany
- Home stadium: Duke Stadium

1957 Atlantic Coast Conference football standings
	Conf.					Overall
Team	W		L		T	W		L		T
No. 15 NC State $	5	–	0	–	1	7	–	1	–	2
No. 16 Duke	5	–	1	–	1	6	–	3	–	2
Clemson	4	–	3	–	0	7	–	3	–	0
North Carolina	4	–	3	–	0	7	–	3	–	0
Maryland	4	–	3	–	0	5	–	5	–	0
Virginia	2	–	4	–	0	3	–	6	–	1
South Carolina	2	–	5	–	0	5	–	5	–	0
Wake Forest	0	–	7	–	0	0	–	10	–	0
$ – Conference champion; Rankings from AP poll

The 1957 Duke Blue Devils football team was an American football team that represented Duke University as a member of the Atlantic Coast Conference (ACC) during the 1957 college football season. In their seventh year under head coach William D. Murray, the Blue Devils compiled an overall record of 6–3–2, with a conference record of 5–1–1, and finished second in the ACC.

== Schedule ==
Date	Opponent	Rank	Site	Result	Attendance	Source
September 21	at South Carolina	No. 10	Carolina Stadium; Columbia, SC	W 26–14	40,000	
September 28	Virginia	No. 7	Duke Stadium; Durham, NC	W 40–0	14,000	
October 5	Maryland^{†}	No. 4	Duke Stadium; Durham, NC	W 14–0	25,000	
October 12	at No. 15 Rice*	No. 5	Rice Stadium; Houston, TX	W 7–6	52,000	
October 19	Wake Forest	No. 5	Duke Stadium; Durham, NC (rivalry)	W 34–7	17,600	
October 26	at No. 11 NC State	No. 4	Riddick Stadium; Raleigh, NC (rivalry)	T 14–14	21,000	
November 2	at Georgia Tech*	No. 7	Grant Field; Atlanta, GA	L 0–13	40,000	
November 9	vs. No. 7 Navy*	No. 16	Memorial Stadium; Baltimore, MD	T 6–6	31,000	
November 16	No. 14 Clemson	No. 11	Duke Stadium; Durham, NC	W 7–6	22,000	
November 23	North Carolina	No. 11	Duke Stadium; Durham, NC (Victory Bell)	L 13–21	40,000	
January 1	vs. No. 4 Oklahoma*	No. 16	Burdine Stadium; Miami, FL (Orange Bowl)	L 21–48	76,318	
*Non-conference game; ^{†}Homecoming; Rankings from AP Poll released prior to the game
