= 1958 Orange Bowl =

American college football game

- 24th Orange Bowl
- Burdine Stadium in Miami, Florida, hosted the Orange Bowl.
Duke Blue Devils	Oklahoma Sooners
(6–2–2)	(9–1)
ACC	Big Seven
21	48
Head coach: William D. Murray	Head coach: Bud Wilkinson
AP / Coaches; 16 / 14	AP / Coaches; 4 / 4
	1	2	3	4	Total
Duke	0	7	7	7	21
Oklahoma	7	7	7	27	48
- Date: January 1, 1958
- Season: 1957
- Stadium: Burdine Stadium
- Location: Miami, Florida
- Favorite: Oklahoma by 10 points
- Referee: John Donohue (ACC; split crew: ACC, Big Seven)
- Attendance: 76,318

United States TV coverage
- Network: CBS
- Announcers: Chris Schenkel & Johnny Lujack

The 1958 Orange Bowl matched the Duke Blue Devils and the Oklahoma Sooners, played in Miami, on New Year's Day.

== Background ==
This was Duke's second Orange Bowl appearance in four seasons, having last appeared in January 1955. They finished second in the Atlantic Coast Conference to North Carolina State, though Duke was invited due to the Wolfpack being on probation. Oklahoma was champion of the Big Seven Conference for the twelfth straight year and were in the Orange Bowl for the fourth time in six seasons (the two absences were due to the conference's rescinded no-repeat rule).

== Game summary ==
Despite being outgained in yards and having more penalties, Oklahoma converted six Duke mistakes (2 fumbles, 2 interceptions, a blocked punt and a wild snap) into touchdowns. Dave Baker returned an interception 94 yards to give the Sooners an early 7–0 lead. Clendon Thomas scored on a touchdown run after a bad punt formation on Duke. Hal McElhaney narrowed the lead on his own touchdown run to make it 14-7 at halftime.

Carl Dodd increased Oklahoma's lead to 21–7, but George Dutrow ran in for a touchdown to make it 21–14 at the end of three quarters. Sandefer and Baker both scored in the fourth quarter and Hobby caught a pass from Baker as Oklahoma scored three times in three minutes on three more Duke turnovers to make it 41–14. McElhaney narrowed the lead on his second touchdown of the game. Duke was given another chance to narrow it again, but the Sooners intercepted George Harris' pass for the second time as Dick Carpenter returned it for a touchdown and sealed the game for Oklahoma, who won their third Orange Bowl in five seasons.

== Aftermath ==
This remains Duke's last Orange Bowl appearance; Oklahoma returned the following year and won again.

== Statistics ==
Statistics	OU	Duke
First downs	11	16
Yards rushing	165	231
Yards passing	114	97
Total yards	279	328
Punts-Average	7-34.7	10-28.1
Fumbles-Lost	2-1	3-2
Interceptions	3	2
Penalties-Yards	12-150	3-25
