= John Kompara =

American football player (1936–2014)

No. 60
- Position: Defensive tackle

Personal information
- Born: April 12, 1936; Canton, Ohio, U.S.
- Died: April 21, 2014 (aged 78); Clermont, Florida, U.S.
- Listed height: 6 ft 2 in (1.88 m)
- Listed weight: 245 lb (111 kg)

Career information
- High school: Canton (OH) McKinley
- College: South Carolina
- NFL draft: 1959: 13th round, 155th overall pick

Career history
- Los Angeles Chargers (1960)

Awards and highlights
- Second-team All-ACC (1957)
- Stats at Pro Football Reference

John Kompara (April 12, 1936 – April 21, 2014) was an American football defensive tackle. He played for the Los Angeles Chargers in 1960.

He died on April 21, 2014, in Clermont, Florida at age 78.
