= Larry Cowart =

American gridiron football player (1936–2004)

Profile
- Position: Center

Personal information
- Born: August 10, 1936; Cameron County, Texas, U.S.
- Died: July 2, 2004; Dallas, Texas, U.S.
- Listed height: 6 ft 4 in (1.93 m)
- Listed weight: 235 lb (107 kg)

Career information
- College: Baylor
- NFL draft: 1958: 3rd round, 26th overall pick

Career history
- 1958–1959: Toronto Argonauts

Larry Cowart (August 10, 1936 – July 2, 2004) was an American professional football player who played for the Toronto Argonauts. He played college football at Baylor University. He was drafted by the Chicago Cardinals in the third round of the 1958 NFL draft.
