= 1957 South Carolina Gamecocks football team =

American college football season

1957 South Carolina Gamecocks football
- Conference: Atlantic Coast Conference
- Record: 5–5 (2–5 ACC)
- Head coach: Warren Giese (2nd season)
- Captains: Nelson Weston; Julius Derrick
- Home stadium: Carolina Stadium

1957 Atlantic Coast Conference football standings
	Conf.					Overall
Team	W		L		T	W		L		T
No. 15 NC State $	5	–	0	–	1	7	–	1	–	2
No. 16 Duke	5	–	1	–	1	6	–	3	–	2
Clemson	4	–	3	–	0	7	–	3	–	0
North Carolina	4	–	3	–	0	7	–	3	–	0
Maryland	4	–	3	–	0	5	–	5	–	0
Virginia	2	–	4	–	0	3	–	6	–	1
South Carolina	2	–	5	–	0	5	–	5	–	0
Wake Forest	0	–	7	–	0	0	–	10	–	0
$ – Conference champion; Rankings from AP poll

The 1957 South Carolina Gamecocks football team represented the University of South Carolina as a member of the Atlantic Coast Conference (ACC) during the 1957 college football season. Led by second-year head coach Warren Giese, the Gamecocks compiled an overall record of 5–5 with a mark of 2–5 in conference play, placing seventh in the ACC. The team played home games at Carolina Stadium in Columbia, South Carolina.

== Schedule ==
Date	Opponent	Site	Result	Attendance	Source
September 21	No. 10 Duke	Carolina Stadium; Columbia, SC	L 14–26	40,000	
September 28	Wofford*	Carolina Stadium; Columbia, SC	W 26–0	5,000	
October 5	at No. 20 Texas*	Memorial Stadium; Austin, TX	W 27–21	38,500	
October 12	Furman*	Carolina Stadium; Columbia, SC	W 58–13	15,000	
October 24	Clemson	Carolina Stadium; Columbia, SC (rivalry)	L 0–13	44,020	
November 2	Maryland	Carolina Stadium; Columbia, SC	L 6–10	18,000	
November 9	at North Carolina	Kenan Memorial Stadium; Chapel Hill, NC (rivalry)	L 6–28	22,000	
November 16	at Virginia	Scott Stadium; Charlottesville, VA	W 13–0	12,000	
November 23	No. 20 NC State	Carolina Stadium; Columbia, SC	L 26–29	14,000	
November 30	at Wake Forest	Bowman Gray Stadium; Winston-Salem, NC	W 26–7	3,000	
*Non-conference game; Rankings from AP Poll released prior to the game
