= Temple Stadium =

Demolished stadium in Pennsylvania, USA

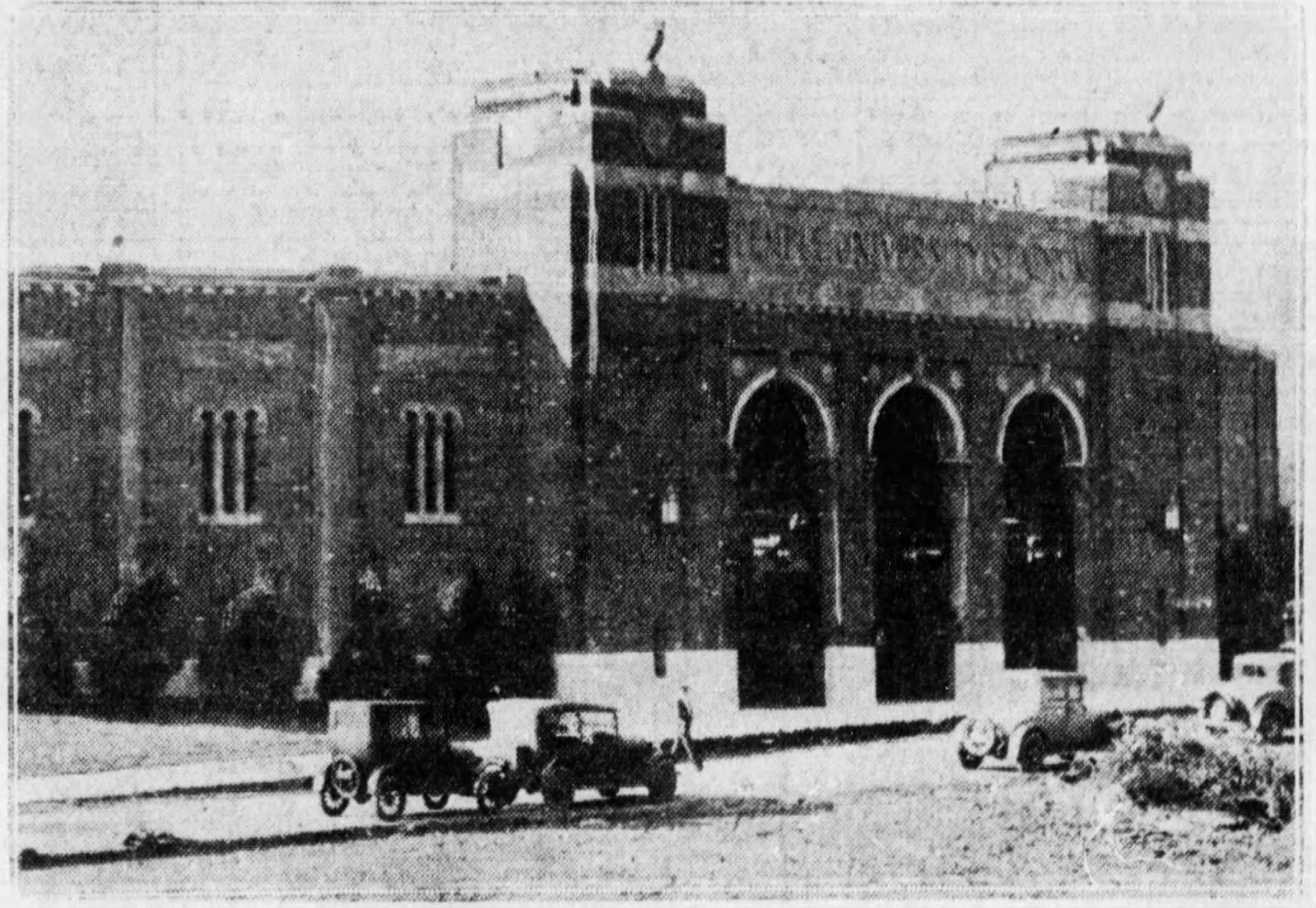
- Temple Stadium (1928)
- Interactive map of Temple Stadium
- Former names: Beury Stadium; Owl Stadium
- Location: Mount Pleasant Avenue and Michener Street, Philadelphia, Pennsylvania, U.S.
- Coordinates: 40.0760°N 75.1661°W
- Capacity: 20,000
- Surface: Grass

Construction
- Opened: September 29, 1928
- Closed: 1995
- Demolished: 1997
- Cost: US$350,000
- Architect: Clarence E. Wunder
- General contractor: Charles G. Erny

Tenants
- Temple Owls football (NCAA) (1928–1977); Temple Owls men's soccer (NCAA) (1928–1995); Philadelphia Bulldogs (CFL) (1965–1966); Philadelphia Spartans (NPSL) (1967); Temple Owls women's soccer (NCAA) (1991–1995)

Temple Stadium was a stadium in Philadelphia, Pennsylvania. It opened in 1928 and hosted the Temple University Owls football team until they moved to Veterans Stadium in 1978.

It was located on a 32-acre (130,000 m^{2}) area in the West Oak Lane neighborhood of the city bounded by Cheltenham Avenue, Vernon Road, Michener Avenue, and Mt. Pleasant Avenue. The football stadium stood on one end of the site; the baseball and softball diamonds stood on the other. The football stadium had seating for approximately 20,000 people; mobile seating raised capacity to 34,200. Temple Stadium was horseshoe-shaped, with the open end facing west-northwest, and built into a natural bowl. It was also known as Owl Stadium and Beury Stadium, named for the school president responsible for its construction. Prior to the building of the stadium, Vernon Park, the park where the stadium was built, was the Owls' home for several years.

== History ==
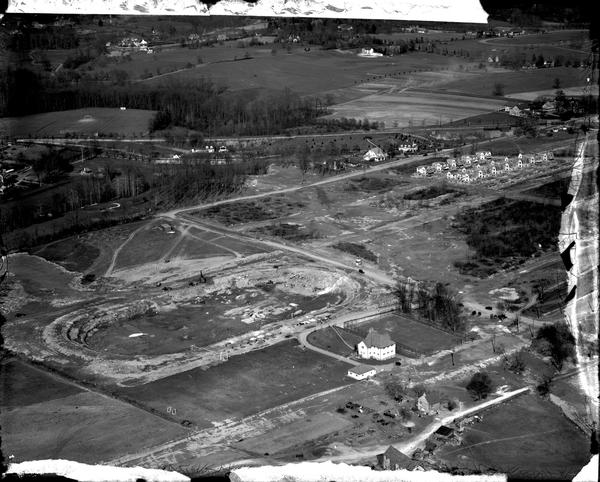
Temple Stadium site under construction in 1928

In 1924, Temple purchased 12 acres (4.9 ha) at the site for $75,000 for physical education classes and the university’s athletic programs. In December 1927, university trustee and city contractor Charles Erny donated $100,000 to the football program for construction of a stadium. Ground broke at the site in February 1928 and construction was completed in time for the September 1928 opener. Erny loaned the university an additional $300,000 for stadium use during the 21 years following Temple Stadium’s opening.

Temple's baseball and soccer teams played their home games at fields adjacent to Temple Stadium. Temple's baseball team began play at Erny Field in 1927. Its soccer team played at the soccer field, also referred to as Erny Field.

The grounds of the old stadium were maintained for several years after Temple's move to Veterans Stadium. The stadium was razed in 1996 and 1997 at a cost of $334,000, leaving only the natural bowl where the soccer teams played and football team practiced. On December 31, 2001, the site was sold to Enon Tabernacle Baptist Church for $4.5 million. The area which was formerly used as a parking lot and intramural field, north of the former stadium, is now home to the Enon Tabernacle Baptist Church's "East" church, completed in 2006. (This is the church's second link to Temple athletics: prior to the building of this church, the church held several larger services in the Liacouras Center.)

== Temple Owls football ==
Temple played 263 home games at Temple Stadium between 1928 and 1977.

Temple opened the stadium on September 29, 1928 with a 12–0 victory over St. Thomas College. The school officially dedicated the stadium on October 13, 1928 before a 7–0 victory over Western Maryland College with Philadelphia Mayor Harry Mackey in attendance.

Temple played its first night game at the stadium on September 26, 1930, defeating Thiel College 13–6 under floodlights. Temple embraced night games under the lights, and from 1930 through 1932, Temple played the most night games of the Eastern teams, winning 13, tying three, and losing none.

One of the largest crowds was on November 24, 1934 when 40,000 fans saw Temple defeat Villanova 22–0.

Temple football held their final event on the field on April 27, 2002 with their annual Cherry and White game.

== Professional football ==
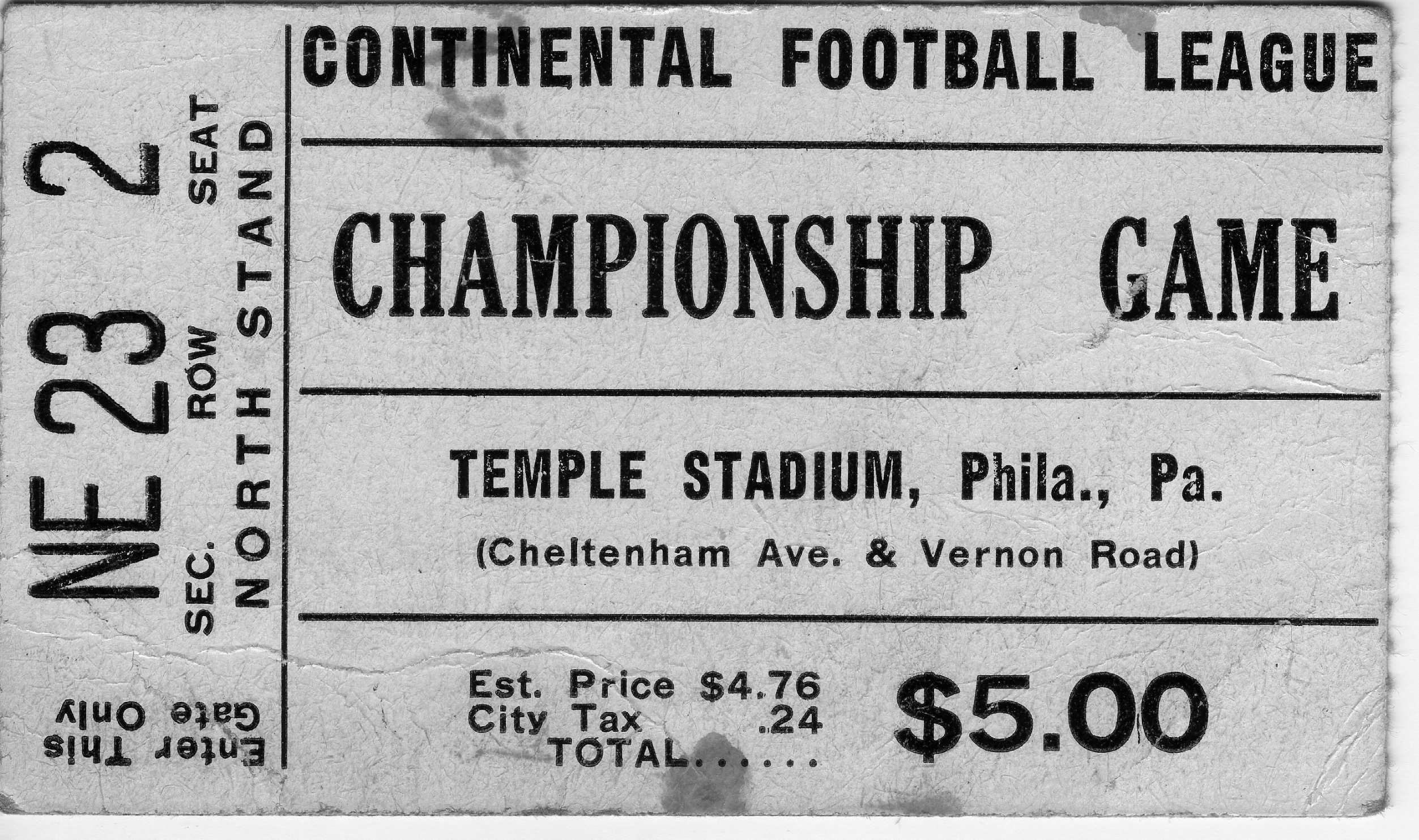
Ticket to Philadelphia Bulldogs football game at Temple Stadium on December 4, 1966.

The Philadelphia Eagles used the stadium twice for regular season home games.

On Tuesday, November 6, 1934, the Eagles beat the Cincinnati Reds, 64–0. This game was historic because it was the first time in NFL history that a team scored ten touchdowns in one game, and it is still the second most lopsided game in NFL history, second only to the Chicago Bears' 73–0 victory over the Washington Redskins in the 1940 NFL Championship Game. It was also the last game ever for the Reds, who had learned the previous day their team was to disband and replaced by the St. Louis Gunners (who, themselves, would only last three games).

The second Eagles game was September 13, 1935 against the Pittsburgh Pirates.

The Eagles held training camp at Temple Stadium prior to the 1936 and 1937 seasons. In a pre-season game on August 27, 1937, the Eagles defeated a team of Eastern college All-Stars 14 to 6 at Temple Stadium in front of 25,000 fans. On August 24, 1938, the Eagles defeated the College All-Stars 14 to 7 in front of 35,000 fans at the stadium.

The Eagles considered trying to purchase Temple Stadium in 1952 when the team was unhappy with their lease at Shibe Park. Temple University claimed the property to have been appraised for $1 million and said they were uninterested in selling. The Eagles would play at Shibe Park through 1957 and then move to Franklin Field.

The Continental Football League Philadelphia Bulldogs played their home games at Temple Stadium during their two seasons in the league. The club won the 1966 league title. On December 4, 1966, the Bulldogs defeated the Orlando Panthers, 20–17 in overtime in front of 5,226 at Temple Stadium for the CFL Championship. The club disbanded in May 1967.

== Soccer ==
Temple Stadium was the long-time home of the Temple University men's and women's soccer teams. The varsity teams played at the Temple Stadium site through the 2002 season.

The National Professional Soccer League began play in 1967. Pittsburgh Steelers' owner Art Rooney led a group of investors who owned the Philadelphia Spartans which played home games at Temple Stadium. The Spartans beat the Toronto Falcons, 2–0, in front of 14,163 in their first match on April 16, 1967, and averaged 5,261 fans per-game in it 16 matches. The club lost more than $250,000 in 1967 and Rooney folded the club after the season.

On September 25, 1968, the U.S. national soccer team played an international friendly against the Israel national team at Temple Stadium. 7,161 saw Israel beat the U.S. 4–0. On May 24, 1970, Serie B soccer-club A.S. Bari defeated Bundesliga club Eintracht Frankfurt 1–0 during the clubs' off-season American tour.

== Other events ==
At dawn of April 21, 1935, more than 75,000 people met at the stadium for an Easter sunrise service, led by Reverend Ross Stover. Another 20,000 were not allowed in due to overcrowding. The stadium was a venue for Easter services for multiple years in the 1930s.

The 1942 Philadelphia City Title high-school football game was played at Temple Stadium. Northeast High School defeated St. Joe's Prep 7–0 on a snow-covered field.

The traditional Thanksgiving Day High School football game between local rivals, North Catholic and Frankford High School was held at Temple Stadium for several games in the 1970s and 80s.

The stadium was host to a concert on May 16, 1970 with performers Jimi Hendrix, the Grateful Dead, The Steve Miller Band and Cactus.
