= Al Jacks =

American football player and coach (1935–2023)

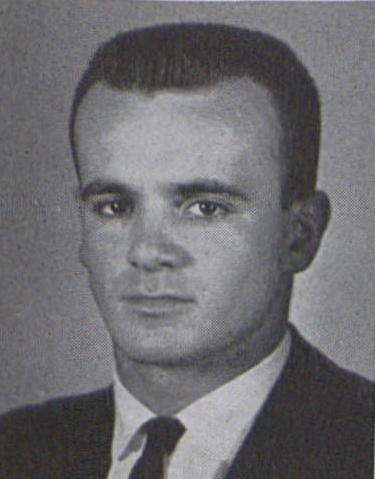
- Jacks at Penn State in 1959

Biographical details
- Born: February 26, 1935; Pittsburgh, Pennsylvania, U.S.
- Died: February 16, 2023 (aged 87); Clarion, Pennsylvania, U.S.

Playing career
- 1956–1958: Penn State
- Position: Quarterback

Coaching career (HC unless noted)
- 1963–1970: Clarion
- 1971: Williams
- 1971–1981: Clarion

Head coaching record
- Overall: 128–46–5

Accomplishments and honors

Championships
- 3 PSAC; 6 PSAC Western Division

Albert Anderson "Jumbo" Jacks (February 26, 1935 – February 16, 2023) was an American professor and college football coach. He played as a quarterback at Penn State University from 1956 to 1958. Jacks spent 19 years as the head football coach at Clarion State College from 1963 to 1981. He very briefly held the same position at Williams College. Jacks is the winningest Clarion football coach by winning percentage. He was also an associate professor of health and physical education at Clarion from 1963 to 1996.

== Early life ==
Jacks attended Peabody High School in Pittsburgh. He went to college at Pennsylvania State University, where he played on the football team as a quarterback from 1956 to 1958 under head coach Rip Engle. He received Bachelor of Science and Master of Science degrees in health and education from Penn State.

== Coaching career ==
Clarion State College (now Clarion University of Pennsylvania) hired Jacks as its head coach for the 1964 season. He led the team to a 10–0 record in 1966 and won the Pennsylvania state championship. Jacks later credited that season with increasing the program's credibility in recruiting circles. While coaching at Clarion, Jacks took courses at Penn State, the University of Michigan, and Slippery Rock University of Pennsylvania.

In January 1971, Jacks accepted the head coaching job at Williams College, but held the position for only five days. He later said, "There was a whole different atmosphere, they didn't approach football the way we did [at Clarion] ... There have been other jobs I looked into, but none were better than I had here." Jack returned to Clarion for the following season. Sports Illustrated stated Jacks "face[d] his biggest rebuilding task in 18 years as coach" in 1980, but that season, he led the team to the Pennsylvania Conference championship. For the performance, the Eastern College Athletic Conference (ECAC) named it the Team of the Year.

In 1981, Jacks stepped down as head coach, but remained on the staff as an assistant coach to Charley Ruslavage, his own former assistant, and an associate professor at the school. He cited time spent away from his family and the demands of the job. At the time of his resignation at the age of 46, he had 18 consecutive winning seasons. During his tenure, Clarion amassed a 128–46–5 record, three Pennsylvania Conference championships, and six Pennsylvania Conference Western Division championships. By winning percentage, Jacks is the most successful Clarion football coach in school history at .729. He held the position of chairman of health and physical education department until retiring in 1996.

== Personal life ==
Jacks and his wife Karen had three sons. Clarion University of Pennsylvania established the Al & Karen Jacks Football Scholarship in honor of Jacks and his late wife and to provide scholarships to eligible athletes. He was inducted into the Clarion University Sports Hall of Fame in the inaugural 1989 class.

He died on February 16, 2023, at the age of 87.
