= Bill Groce =

American football player and coach (1936–2012)

Biographical details
- Born: April 16, 1936; Pittsburg, Texas, U.S.
- Died: May 15, 2012 (aged 76); Texas, U.S.

Playing career
- 1956: SMU
- 1957–1959: North Texas
- Position: Fullback

Coaching career (HC unless noted)
- 1970–1974: Arkansas A&M / Arkansas–Monticello

Head coaching record
- Overall: 11–39

Billy Thomas Groce (April 16, 1936 – March 15, 2012) was an American football player and coach. He was a three-time letter winner at the University of North Texas–then known as North Texas State College–from 1957 to 1959. He was drafted in the 25th round by the Pittsburgh Steelers in the 1958 NFL draft. Groce served as the head football coach at the University of Arkansas–Monticello from 1970 to 1974, compiling a record of 11–39.

He died in 2012 at the age of 75.

== Head coaching record ==
Year	Team	Overall	Conference	Standing	Bowl/playoffs
Arkansas A&M / Arkansas–Monticello Boll Weevils (Arkansas Intercollegiate Conference) (1970–1974)
1970	Arkansas A&M	1–9	1–5	T–6th	
1971	Arkansas–Monticello	3–7	2–4	T–4th	
1972	Arkansas–Monticello	2–8	1–5	6th	
1973	Arkansas–Monticello	2–8	0–6	7th	
1974	Arkansas–Monticello	3–7	1–5	6th	
Arkansas A&M / Arkansas–Monticello:		11–39	5–25		
Total:		11–39			
