= 1957 NC State Wolfpack football team =

American college football season

1957 NC State Wolfpack football

ACC champion
- Conference: Atlantic Coast Conference

Ranking
- Coaches: No. 20
- AP: No. 15
- Record: 7–1–2 (5–0–1 ACC)
- Head coach: Earle Edwards (4th season)
- Home stadium: Riddick Stadium

1957 Atlantic Coast Conference football standings
	Conf.					Overall
Team	W		L		T	W		L		T
No. 15 NC State $	5	–	0	–	1	7	–	1	–	2
No. 16 Duke	5	–	1	–	1	6	–	3	–	2
Clemson	4	–	3	–	0	7	–	3	–	0
North Carolina	4	–	3	–	0	7	–	3	–	0
Maryland	4	–	3	–	0	5	–	5	–	0
Virginia	2	–	4	–	0	3	–	6	–	1
South Carolina	2	–	5	–	0	5	–	5	–	0
Wake Forest	0	–	7	–	0	0	–	10	–	0
$ – Conference champion; Rankings from AP poll

The 1957 NC State Wolfpack football team represented North Carolina State University during the 1957 college football season. The Wolfpack were led by fourth-year head coach Earle Edwards and played their home games at Riddick Stadium in Raleigh, North Carolina. The team competed as a member of the Atlantic Coast Conference, winning the conference title with an undefeated 5–0–1 record. This was NC State's first conference title in the ACC, and the school's first title since 1927, when they were members of the Southern Conference.

== Schedule ==
Date	Time	Opponent	Rank	Site	Result	Attendance	Source
September 21		at North Carolina		Kenan Memorial Stadium; Chapel Hill, NC (rivalry)	W 7–0	39,000	
September 28		at Maryland		Byrd Stadium; College Park, MD	W 48–13	24,000	
October 5		at Clemson	No. 13	Memorial Stadium; Clemson, SC (rivalry)	W 13–7	17,000	
October 12		at Florida State*	No. 13	Doak Campbell Stadium; Tallahassee, FL	W 7–0	16,200	
October 18		at Miami (FL)*	No. 12	Burdine Stadium; Miami, FL	T 0–0	40,783	
October 26		No. 4 Duke	No. 11	Riddick Stadium; Raleigh, NC (rivalry)	T 14–14	21,000	
November 2		Wake Forest	No. 10	Riddick Stadium; Raleigh, NC (rivalry)	W 19–0	10,000	
November 9		William & Mary*	No. 10	Riddick Stadium; Raleigh, NC	L 6–7	11,000	
November 16	1:30 p.m.	vs. VPI*	No. 19	Victory Stadium; Roanoke, VA	W 12–0	6,000	
November 23		at South Carolina	No. 20	Carolina Stadium; Columbia, SC	W 29–26	14,000	
*Non-conference game; Rankings from AP Poll released prior to the game
