= 1957 All-Atlantic Coast Conference football team =

American college football all-star team

The 1957 All-Atlantic Coast Conference football team consists of American football players chosen by various selectors for their All-Atlantic Coast Conference ("ACC") teams for the 1957 college football season. Selectors in 1957 included the Associated Press (AP) and United Press (UP). The only unanimous choice on the AP team was halfback Dick Christy of North Carolina State.

== All-Atlantic Coast selections ==
=== Ends ===
- Buddy Payne, North Carolina (AP-1; UP-1)
- Ed Cooke, Maryland (AP-1; UP-1)
- Ray Masneri, Clemson (AP-2)
- Bill Thompson, Duke (AP-2)

=== Tackles ===
- Tom Topping, Duke (AP-1; UP-1)
- Phil Blazer, North Carolina (AP-1; UP-1)
- John Kompara, South Carolina (AP-2)
- Darrell Dess, North Carolina State (AP-2)

=== Guards ===
- Roy Hord, Jr., Duke (AP-1; UP-1)
- Rodney Breedlove, Maryland (AP-1)
- John Grdijan, Clemson (AP-2; UP-1)
- Bill Rearick, North Carolina State (AP-2)

=== Centers ===
- Jim Oddo, North Carolina State (AP-1; UP-1)
- Gene Alderton, Maryland (AP-2)

=== Backs ===
- Dick Christy, North Carolina State (AP-1; UP-1)
- Wray Carlton, Duke (AP-1; UP-1)
- Jim Bakhtiar, Virginia (AP-1; UP-1)
- Harvey White, Clemson (AP-1; UP-1)
- Alex Hawkins, South Carolina (AP-2; UP-2)
- King Dixon, South Carolina (AP-2; UP-2)
- Dick Hunter, North Carolina State (AP-2; UP-2)
- Hal McElhaney, Duke (AP-2; UP-2)

== Key ==
AP = Associated Press, chosen by 78 voters of the Atlantic Coast Sports Writers Association
UP = United Press

== See also ==
- 1957 College Football All-America Team
