= 1957 North Carolina Tar Heels football team =

American college football season

1957 North Carolina Tar Heels football
- Conference: Atlantic Coast Conference
- Record: 6–4 (4–3 ACC)
- Head coach: Jim Tatum (3rd season)
- Captains: Dave Reed; Buddy Payne
- Home stadium: Kenan Memorial Stadium

1957 Atlantic Coast Conference football standings
| | Conf. | | | | | Overall |
| Team | W | | L | | T | W | | L | | T |
|---|---|---|---|---|---|---|---|---|---|---|
| No. 15 NC State $ | 5 | – | 0 | – | 1 | 7 | – | 1 | – | 2 |
| No. 16 Duke | 5 | – | 1 | – | 1 | 6 | – | 3 | – | 2 |
| Clemson | 4 | – | 3 | – | 0 | 7 | – | 3 | – | 0 |
| North Carolina | 4 | – | 3 | – | 0 | 7 | – | 3 | – | 0 |
| Maryland | 4 | – | 3 | – | 0 | 5 | – | 5 | – | 0 |
| Virginia | 2 | – | 4 | – | 0 | 3 | – | 6 | – | 1 |
| South Carolina | 2 | – | 5 | – | 0 | 5 | – | 5 | – | 0 |
| Wake Forest | 0 | – | 7 | – | 0 | 0 | – | 10 | – | 0 |
$ – Conference champion; Rankings from AP poll

The 1957 North Carolina Tar Heels football team represented the University of North Carolina at Chapel Hill during the 1957 college football season. The Tar Heels were led by third-year head coach Jim Tatum and played their home games at Kenan Memorial Stadium. The team competed as a member of the Atlantic Coast Conference, finishing tied for third.

== Schedule ==
| Date | Time | Opponent | Rank | Site | Result | Attendance | Source |
|---|---|---|---|---|---|---|---|
| September 21 | 2:00 p.m. | NC State | | Kenan Memorial Stadium; Chapel Hill, NC (rivalry) | L 0–7 | 39,000 | |
| September 28 | 2:00 p.m. | Clemson | | Kenan Memorial Stadium; Chapel Hill, NC | W 26–0 | 16,000 | |
| October 5 | 2:00 p.m. | No. 6 Navy* | | Kenan Memorial Stadium; Chapel Hill, NC | W 13–7 | 25,000 | |
| October 11 | 8:15 p.m. | at Miami (FL)* | No. 18 | Burdine Stadium; Miami, FL | W 20–13 | 47,166 | |
| October 19 | 2:15 p.m. | at Maryland | No. 14 | Byrd Stadium; College Park, MD | L 7–21 | 43,000 | |
| October 26 | 2:00 p.m. | at Wake Forest | | Bowman Gray Stadium; Winston-Salem, NC (rivalry) | W 14–7 | 15,000 | |
| November 2 | 2:00 p.m. | No. 17 Tennessee* | | Kenan Memorial Stadium; Chapel Hill, NC | L 0–35 | 34,000 | |
| November 9 | 2:00 p.m. | South Carolina | | Kenan Memorial Stadium; Chapel Hill, NC (rivalry) | W 28–6 | 22,000 | |
| November 23 | 2:00 p.m. | at No. 11 Duke | | Duke Stadium; Durham, NC (Victory Bell) | W 21–13 | 40,000 | |
| November 30 | 2:00 p.m. | Virginia | | Kenan Memorial Stadium; Chapel Hill, NC (South's Oldest Rivalry) | L 13–20 | 15,000 | |
*Non-conference game; Rankings from AP Poll released prior to the game; All times are in Eastern time
