= Black Economic Union =

American non-profit organization

- Founded: 1965; 61 years ago
- Founder: Jim Brown
- Type: Nonprofit organization
- Location(s): Cleveland, Ohio (1965-1968) Kansas City, Kansas (1968-), U.S.
- Formerly called: Negro Industrial and Economic Union

The Black Economic Union (BEU), formerly known as the Negro Industrial and Economic Union (NIEU), is an American nonprofit organization that was established in the 1960s by NFL legend, actor, and social activist Jim Brown.

== History ==
The Negro Industrial and Economic Union (NIEU) was founded in 1965 by Jim Brown of the National Football League's Cleveland Browns. While still in the NFL, Brown established the Black empowerment organization, retiring the following year in 1966. Teammates Walter Beach, Sid Williams, and John Wooten joined Brown, with Wooten as executive director, Carl B. Stokes as legal advisor, and Arnold R. Pinkney as secretary and treasurer.

An extension of Brown's pro-Black social activism, the Union focused on self-reliance, supporting businesses, and economic growth in the Black community. In the 1960s and 1970s, Union members launched training programs, issued loans, and created jobs. Brown revealed the group supported 400 Black-owned businesses during its peak from 1967 to 1974.

Formed in Cleveland, Ohio, the organization had its main offices at 10501 Euclid Avenue in University Circle. The NIEU soon established branches in other major U.S. cities like L.A. and New York City. By 1967, UCLA star Kareem Abdul-Jabbar, then known as Lew Alcindor, was volunteering at the NIEU's Los Angeles chapter. Booker Griffin, known for his activism and work in radio, held the position of Los Angeles director for the Negro Industrial and Economic Union.

=== Cleveland Summit ===
On June 4, 1967, the NIEU hosted the historic Cleveland Summit, where Jim Brown gathered 11 top Black athletes and future mayor Carl Stokes to join Muhammad Ali in a press conference addressing his rejection of the Vietnam War draft. Ali faced national backlash for his stance, and the attendees also endured criticism and threats. Its Cleveland office was the site of the historic meeting, with Ali joined in the front row by Jim Brown, Bill Russell, and Kareem Abdul-Jabbar. In the back row stood Carl Stokes, Walter Beach, Bobby Mitchell, Sid Williams, Curtis McClinton, Willie Davis, Jim Shorter, and John Wooten.

=== Expansion ===
The NIEU expanded in summer 1968 after receiving $520,000 from the Ford Foundation in April and $251,400 from the Economic Development Administration. The grants supported new offices in Kansas City, San Francisco, and Washington, and increased staffing in Cleveland, Los Angeles, and New York. The national economic union opened up in Missouri with help from members of the Kansas City Chiefs like Curtis McClinton.

==== Black Economic Union ====
Rebranded the Black Economic Union (BEU), the group dropped "Negro" from its title in 1970 when the regional offices began to disband.

Brown organized the Annual Jim Brown Golf Classic in 1970 to bring awareness to the initiative.

By 1979, the BEU had established five neighborhood offices in Kansas City and grown into a citywide organization focused on both business and economic development. Managing a budget of more than $500,000, it provided loan packaging, job training, technical support, and other services to support minority and low-income businesses.
