= Walter Beach =

American football player (born 1933)

No. 26, 41, 49
- Positions: Defensive back, running back

Personal information
- Born: January 31, 1933 (age 93); Pontiac, Michigan, U.S.
- Listed height: 6 ft 0 in (1.83 m)
- Listed weight: 190 lb (86 kg)

Career information
- High school: Pontiac Central
- College: Central Michigan (1956–1959)
- NFL draft: 1960: 15th round, 180th overall pick
- AFL draft: 1960

Career history
- Hamilton Tiger-Cats (1960); Boston Patriots (1960–1961); Cleveland Browns (1963–1966)

Awards and highlights
- NFL champion (1964); First-team Little All-American (1959); 2× First-team All-IIAC (1957−1958)

Career NFL/AFL statistics
- Interceptions: 6
- Fumble recoveries: 2
- Receptions: 9
- Receiving yards: 132
- Total touchdowns: 2
- Stats at Pro Football Reference

Walter Beach, III (born January 31, 1933) is an American former professional football player who was a defensive back in the American Football League (AFL) and National Football League (NFL). He played college football for the Central Michigan Chippewas.

== High school and military service ==
Beach grew up in Pontiac, Michigan and attended Pontiac Central High School, where he was a member of the varsity football, basketball, and track teams, and reportedly held the state record in the 100- and 200- yard dashes. He also played American Legion baseball.

Following high school, he served for four years in the U.S. Air Force, three of them spent in Germany.

Beach encountered much racism in his hometown and in the Air Force. He later said, "I remember my Air Force drill instructor telling me, 'If you hit every white man who calls you [the "N-word"], you won’t have any fists left.' This made me realize there are other ways to fight."

== Collegiate education and sports ==
After completion of his military service, Beach attended Central Michigan University from 1956 to 1960, graduating in 1960 with a bachelor's degree in sociology.

He played college football for four years there, as a member of the offense. He led the team in both rushing and pass reception in his sophomore and junior years, the 1957 and 1958 seasons. Over four years he rushed for a total of 2,968 yards and caught 62 passes for 928 yards. Each of those three statistics set a Central Michigan record, as did his yards of total offense (Note: 3,018 yards according to the university website, but there is apparently some error since that number is less than the sum of its components, his total rushing yards (2,968) and passing yards (928).) and his 1957 single-season rushing yardage, 1,084. Among numerous other honors, Beach was named first-team all-conference in 1957 and 1958, Central Michigan's most valuable player in 1958 and 1959, and AP All-American in 1959. He was inducted into the university's Hall of Fame in 1985.

Beach was the only African-American player on the team. He later praised the team's (white) coach, Kenneth Kelly, as "a man" for refusing to accept racism aimed at Beach. For example, Beach said, when the team was on the road and a hotel refused to provide accommodation for Beach because of his skin color, Kelly told the hotel and the team, "In that case, all of us are sleeping on the team bus tonight."

In addition to playing football, Beach also ran track for Central Michigan, tying the school record in the 100-yard dash.

== Professional football career ==
Beach was selected by the National Football League's New York Giants in the 15th round of the 1960 NFL draft, but was released in training camp.

He then signed with the Boston Patriots of the American Football League, and played professionally with them in 1960 and 1961. In 1960, he played in six games as a fullback, halfback, and flanker, caught nine passes for 132 yards and one touchdown, returned seven kickoffs for 146 yards, and returned one punt for 21 yards. After the 1960 season, Beach switched from playing offense to defense. Playing right cornerback in 1961, he made one interception which he returned for 37 yards, and returned two kickoffs for 38 yards.

Beach did not play football during the 1962 season; instead, he returned to his hometown of Pontiac to teach elementary school students. Reportedly, the Patriots cut Beach from the team after the 1961 season because they considered him a "troublemaker," on the day after Beach had organized a protest by the team's African-American players against segregated accommodations in New Orleans, where black and white teammates were supposed to stay in separate hotels.

After a year away from football, Beach played cornerback for the Cleveland Browns in the National Football League for four seasons at a time, according to Beach, that many teams believed African-American players lacked the intelligence to play defensive back. He credits his friend and high school teammate Jim Shorter, who then played defensive back for the Browns, for recommending that he contact the Browns before the 1963 season, and they offered him a contract. That season, however, he only played in one game.

1964 was Beach's (and probably, as of 2022, the Browns') best season in professional football. He states that he was almost cut from the team in training camp, but that the Browns' star running back Jim Brown intervened, successfully arguing with the team that they should keep Beach, as he was a "quality player." Beach played right cornerback in 14 games, started in 13 of them, made four interceptions for 81 yards including one 65-yard touchdown, and recovered one fumble.

Mike McLain, a sports journalist who covered the Browns for "most of 33 years," describing in 2021 his outstanding childhood memory of attending Browns games, wrote, "To this day I can still see defensive back Walter Beach weave through what seemed like the entire Detroit Lions defense [sic] in returning an interception for a touchdown on the last play of the game to seal a Browns' win."

In the 1964 NFL Championship Game, which the Browns won 27-0 over the favored Baltimore Colts, Beach was a key part of a Browns defense that shut out its opponents in a championship game, an accomplishment that, as of 2022, no professional football team has repeated since 1964. Beach started the game, covered future Hall of Fame wide receiver Raymond Berry, held him to three receptions for 38 yards, made one interception on Johnny Unitas, and returned it for nine yards.

In the 1965 season, Beach started in eight games and played in ten. In the 1965 NFL Championship Game, although the Browns lost 23-12 to the Green Bay Packers, Beach intercepted another legendary quarterback, Bart Starr.

In the 1966 season, Beach started in three games and played in five, making one interception (against Sonny Jurgensen of the Washington Redskins) and recovering one fumble.

During the 1966 season, on the team's flight home from a West Coast game, Beach was reading Message to the Blackman in America by Elijah Muhammad. Browns owner Art Modell asked him not to read that book and Beach responded to the effect that Modell employed him, but did not own him, and could not dictate what he could read.

Following that season, on June 4, 1967, Beach was part of a group of twelve prominent African-American men ― eleven athletes and one politician ― who, in what is now known as the "Cleveland Summit" or the "Muhammad Ali Summit," met and then publicly supported Muhammad Ali's refusal to be inducted into the United States Army, as a conscientious objector to the Vietnam War.

Beach did not play professional football again. He said that at the start of the 1967 season the Browns put him on waivers, which would allow any other team to hire him, but twice when other teams were interested, the Browns retracted Beach's name from the waiver list, preventing them from hiring him. He said he had been "blackballed" from the NFL.

He later filed an antitrust lawsuit against the NFL and the Browns, alleging "that there was a conspiracy between the Cleveland Browns, the National Football League and its fifteen teams to deny him employment because of his expression of his political views and his race." In 1971, the Federal District Court for the Southern District of New York denied the defendants' motion to transfer the case's venue from New York to Ohio. The lawsuit was settled in 1975, with Beach receiving back pay and his pension (which had been denied).

== Subsequent career and activities ==
After his football career, among other things Beach served as the youth coordinator for the City of Cleveland under Mayor Carl Stokes, attended Yale Law School, and studied Surat Shabd Yoga in India. Beach is the CEO of Amer-I-Can of New York, a life skills management program founded by his friend and teammate Jim Brown. In 2014, Beach authored the memoir Consider This (ISBN 978-0-9652-0105-6). In 2020 he published another book, The Sting of the Whip. He lives in Pennsylvania.

== See also ==
- List of American Football League players
