= Out of bounds (disambiguation) =

Out of bounds is the state of being outside the playing boundaries of the field in sports.

Out of bounds may also refer to:

== Film and television ==
- Out of Bounds (1986 film), a 1986 film starring Anthony Michael Hall
- Out of Bounds (2003 film), a 2003 film
- Out of Bounds (2005 film), a 2005 documentary film on the Iwahig Prison and Penal Farm in the Philippines
- Out of Bounds (TV series), a 1977 children's action drama serial about two teenage gymnasts

== Literature ==
- Out of Bounds (play), a 1962 play by Arthur Watkyn
- Out of Bounds (autobiography), a 1989 American book about football player Jim Brown
- Out of Bounds (comic strip), a comic strip created by Don Wilder and Bill Rechin
- Out of Bounds (McDermid novel), a 2016 crime novel set in Scotland by Val McDermid
- Out of Bounds, a 2004 young adult novel by Annie Bryant in the Beacon Street Girls series
- Out of Bounds: Stories of Conflict and Hope, a 2003 book by Beverley Naidoo
- Out of Bounds (1934–1935), a magazine about English public school politics by Esmond Romilly
  - Out of Bounds: The Education of Giles Romilly and Esmond Romilly (1916–1967), 1935 book by Esmond and his brother Giles

== Music ==
- Out of Bounds (Eric Bana album), a 1994 comedy album by Australian actor Eric Bana
- Out of Bounds (No Fun at All album), by the Swedish band No Fun at All
- Out of Bounds (Rajaton album), a 2006 music album of the Finnish ensemble Rajaton

== Other uses ==
- Out-of-bounds, in computer programming; see Bounds checking

== See also ==
- Out-of-band, communication outside the primary communication channel
- Off Limits (disambiguation)
