= Booker Griffin =

Booker Griffin Jr. was a journalist based in Los Angeles during the civil rights era. He wrote articles for the Los Angeles Sentinel and was considered direct and forthright about the struggles of the Black community in Los Angeles but also across the nation generally. He had a brief stint as a radio talk show host for KGFJ radio. He was also a prominent leader in the Black Economic Union but during its times as the Negro Industrial and Economic Union (NIEU). He was politically involved volunteering on Robert F. Kennedy's presidential campaign, witnessing his assassination, as well as running for local office.

Griffin was active in many areas of life in Los Angeles, focusing his work and involvement specifically on the Black community. Musically he was a key figure at Motown Records for some time and he wrote a cutting article in the Sentinel about The Osmonds and their interpretation of Black music. In terms of sports the NIEU branch in Los Angeles was under his charge for some time, and this was an organization born by Black sports stars such as Jim Brown, Dick Bass and Muhammad Ali. Further, his international renown in Africa as a media personality got him a key role in the publicizing of the greatest boxing competitions of the twentieth century.

== Early life ==
Booker Griffin Jr. was born and raised in Gary, Indiana. His parents Booker Sr and Bertha Griffin had three children; Booker Jr. had two sisters. He studied at Baldwin Wallace University in Berea, Ohio. He moved to Los Angeles in 1962 seeking work with his friend John Daniels, this work would lead him to meet Dick Bass who would later serve as chapter leader for the NIEU.

== Professional career ==
Griffin's professional career lasted more than 30 years and during that time he spanned all areas of journalism, media and writing. His work at the Los Angeles Sentinel was his most notable work however his accolades and the caliber of his positions spans far and wide.

His writing for the Los Angeles Sentinel was unwaveringly critical. Mayor Tom Bradley and Police Chief Daryl Gates were subjects of much criticism as Griffin believed that they did not do enough for the Black community in Los Angeles. As well as this, Griffin wrote articles surrounding other issues such as Chicano presence in Los Angeles, Robert F. Kennedy and the Apollo 11. He was direct and forthright:

"His long suit and his weak suit was his ability to tell it like it was," said Bill Shearer, vice president and general manager of KGFJ. "Sometimes it served him well and sometimes it didn't."

As well as his writing for the Los Angeles Sentinel, he was news director at KGFJ radio in Los Angeles. While there, he was one of the most talked about radio hosts of the time, partly due to his incredibly controversial nature. Consequently, due to his popularity, he met and worked with Jim Randolph, and together the two of them created the first Freedom Classic Football game in 1969.

His experience as a writer and as a radio personality earned him some prominent roles in African politics. The president of Tanzania the time, Julius Nyerere appointed Griffin as the media consultant for the sixth annual Pan-African Congress. His work here then made him known to the government of Zaire (now the DRC) who commissioned him to write and produce a travel film from the nation. After seeing this famous boxing promoter Don King hired him to help promote The Rumble in the Jungle. He stayed in media for many years after that, writing books and films.

His media presence and celebrity status in Los Angeles garnered him a network of influential associations. These associations, especially with football star Jim Brown led him to the NIEU but also made him a prominent figure in the Los Angeles Black community. As a result of his prominence as well as his history of journalism, he worked briefly for Motown Records as a publicist and special assistant to the president of the label.

Being the vocal activist he was, and a champion of the Black community in Los Angeles, it seems only right that he was involved politically. He was a local volunteer in Robert F. Kennedy's presidential campaign but also made his own attempts at politics. However was unsuccessful in his campaigns against former Assemblyman Bill Green in both 1970 and 1972.

=== Writings at the Sentinel ===
"Moon Dust and Black Disgust"

This article is a biting take on the Apollo 11 Moon landing of 1969. Griffin writes in his classic "say it as it is" style and does not spare the rhetoric. He starts the article by making clear that despite the monumental nature of the occasion he does not share in the joy of the rest of the nation. He reminds the reader of the cost of the moon mission and how he believes it is wasted exploring "rocks, craters and dust thousands of miles away"

In the last paragraph of the article he makes reference to the Vietnam War and the American south. These are more examples, in his opinion, of more examples of the American government spending money in places it does not need to be spend. He says that Black people in poverty "ain't in the crowd". He recognizes that the moon landing is a cause for celebration for some yet he does not share in that joy while Black people across the country live in poverty.

This article is an example of how focused Griffin was on the advancement of Black people in the United States, that even an occasion as monumental as the moon landing is a misuse of government money.

"Black-Chicano Cooperation Termed One-sided Ripoff"

As two demographics at the lower end of economic development in America, in many of the poorer areas in cities like Los Angeles tension arose between Black communities and Chicano communities, especially with Mexican Americans. Conflict between Black "ghettos" and Chicano "barrios" went to further divisions within the working classes rather than unite them.

[T]hey have overrun the ghetto with taco joints and I don't know of one chitterling or rib joint in the barrio.

In the article "Black-Chicano Cooperation Termed One-Sided Ripoff", Griffin highlights his disdain of the Chicano presence in the poorer areas of Los Angeles. The quote above shows that he believes that Chicano communities are being invasive in Black communities however the alternative is not happening.

The narrative that Griffin speaks of in this article is very controversial, from his perspective the Black community rioted and protested for the rights of minorities in America, and now the benefits of these riots are starting to be handed down, the Chicano community are stealing them from the Black community. He does not however paint this as a one-sided exploitation; he also places a responsibility onto the Black community for allowing this to take place.

One of his key points is that Black Americans have lived in America for decades and generations and as such are civilians of that nation yet are left without help from the state, whereas Chicanos, as Griffin calls them, are "aliens".

"Fatalism, Destiny: Fear Now Real"

This is a harrowing article about the assassination of Robert F. Kennedy on his campaign tour. As a volunteer on this tour Griffin was witness to the assassination as it unfolded and "was one of the first people at the senators feet as he fell". He speaks frighteningly of an air of anticipation and a lack of surprise that Kennedy was assassinated. He recounts speaking to one lady who insisted that despite how much she liked Kennedy she would not vote for him as she did not want to make him a target, whereas other people felt that somehow he was already a target. Griffin himself even speaks of how immediately before the event he had a feeling of anxiety surrounding the area in which he was eventually shot; the volume of people and how easy it would be to blend into such a crowd.

It is an emotional recounting of the story and Griffin speaks of his suspicion of the shooter before he became the shooter. In a more positive tone he speaks of how the final moments of Robert Kennedy's life revealed the man he was; he was concerned as to whether or not anyone else had been hurt in the shooting, as well as this Griffin states that there was a look of determination and courage on the dying mans face.

== NIEU ==
Black Economic Union, formerly the Negro Industrial and Economic Union was an organization fronted by Jim Brown, former American footballer, and backed by many high-profile athletes including John Wooten and Kareem Abdul-Jabbar. The NIEU was founded in Ohio but spread across the country. Their purpose was to provide financial support to sustain Black businesses in an effort "to promote, encourage, motivate and develop" African American success in the economic, social, and political fabric of American life.

It was later renamed as the Black Economic Union in 1970 when its popularity began to die down.

As of today the Black economic Union still exists and they function in the Kansas City, Missouri area. They are continuing the mission started in 1968 of:

The mission of the Black Economic Union of Greater Kansas City is to enhance the quality of life of African American citizens by promoting economic, social, and physical redevelopment and revitalization of communities within Greater Kansas City.

They have been responsible for the development of 635 affordable multi-family units; 320 elderly units; 85 single family homes.

=== Griffin's influence ===
Griffin was one of the key organizers in the Los Angeles chapter. At the time Richard Lee "Dick" Bass was West Coast executive director. Griffin, his assistant Stephani Swanigan, and Bass, were considered the entirety of the staff at the Los Angeles branch however they had great success and the NIEU was considered to be a major community program in the area. The purpose of the NIEU at this time was to promote Black self sufficiency. Loans were given to Black businesses with good interest rates and as such act as an investment in the Black community.

One of the contributing reasons for their success was the social ability of Griffin to know many people in the Los Angeles area. Sid Williams noted that not only was Griffin "political" but he also "knew everybody". This served as a massive benefit for the chapter as they looked to seeks sponsorship to provide support to Black businesses in the area. Not only did they try to support Black-owned businesses, but they also sought to educate the youth and help them to seek employment and internship opportunities.

== Personal life ==
Griffin married Lynette Hewette Griffin and were married for 23 years. During this time they had a son named Jabari. He died at the age of 55 at Kaiser Permanente Hospital in West Los Angeles after suffering a stroke induced by diabetes.
