= Sam Valentine =

American football player (1934–1985)

Profile
- Position: Guard

Personal information
- Born: October 13, 1934; Pennsylvania
- Died: January 13, 1985 (age 50); Union Pier, Michigan
- Listed weight: 194 lb (88 kg)

Career information
- College: Penn State

Awards and highlights
- First-team All-American (1956); First-team All-Eastern (1956)

Salvatore "Sam" Valentine (October 13, 1934 – January 13, 1985) was an American football player. He played college football at the guard position for the Penn State Nittany Lions football team from 1954 to 1956 and was captain of the 1956 team. He was selected by the Football Writers Association of America and the Central Press Association as a first-team player on their respective 1956 College Football All-America Teams, and received second-team honors from the Associated Press and United Press. In February 1957, he was named Pennsylvania's football athlete of the year.
