= Ron Beagle =

American football player (1934–2015)

No. 80
- Position: End

Personal information
- Born: February 7, 1934; Hartford, Connecticut, U.S.
- Died: September 8, 2015 (aged 81); Sacramento, California, U.S.
- Listed height: 6 ft 0 in (1.83 m)
- Listed weight: 185 lb (84 kg)

Career information
- High school: Purcell (Cincinnati, Ohio)
- College: Navy (1953–1955)

Awards and highlights
- Eastern champion (1954); Maxwell Award (1954); Unanimous All-American (1955); Consensus All-American (1954); 2× First-team All-Eastern (1954, 1955)
- College Football Hall of Fame

Ronald Beagle (February 7, 1934 – September 8, 2015) was an American football end. He played college football for the Navy Midshipmen, where he won the Maxwell Award in 1954.

== Early life ==
Beagle was born in Hartford, Connecticut, but played high school football in Cincinnati.

== College career ==
He entered the United States Naval Academy in 1952. A physical player, Beagle won All-American recognition in his junior and senior seasons during an era in which ends played 60 minutes. He won the Maxwell Award in 1954. Beagle finished his three-year career with 64 receptions for 849 yards (mostly from George Welsh) and eight touchdowns despite having a broken hand.

He also was All-America in lacrosse.

== After football ==
Beagle was selected by the Chicago Cardinals in the 17th round with the 197th overall pick of the 1956 NFL draft. Before he was to join the Cardinals, he served four years in the United States Marines. He suffered a knee injury while playing football in the service and was never able to recover. He went into business in Sacramento, California.

== Personal life ==
Beagle married a Navy nurse, Jo Ann Jones. Their daughter, Ronda J. Beagle, graduated from the Naval Academy in 1984. The Beagles were among the first families with a father and daughter who graduated from the academy. Ronda Beagle authored a 1993 book on the Navy's efforts to recruit women.

Uniquely in the history of the sport, Beagle and Roger Staubach played football for the same high school (Purcell in Cincinnati), played college ball at the same school (Navy), won the Maxwell Award, made All-American team, and eventually were inducted into the College Football Hall of Fame, with Beagle receiving that honor in 1986.
