= John Cenci =

American football player (1934–2026)

No. 55
- Position: Center

Personal information
- Born: January 4, 1934; Pittsburgh, Pennsylvania, U.S.
- Died: January 19, 2026 (aged 92)
- Listed height: 6 ft 0 in (1.83 m)
- Listed weight: 215 lb (98 kg)

Career information
- High school: Schenley (Pittsburgh)
- College: Pittsburgh

Career history
- Pittsburgh Steelers (1956)

Awards and highlights
- First-team All-Eastern (1955)

Career statistics
- Games played: 7
- Stats at Pro Football Reference

John Richard Cenci (January 4, 1934 – January 19, 2026) was an American professional football player who was a center for the Pittsburgh Steelers of the National Football League (NFL). He played college football for the Pittsburgh Panthers. Cenci died on January 19, 2026, at the age of 92.
