= Sam McCord =

American football player (1933–2018)

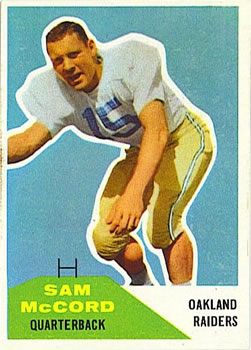
- 1960 Fleer trading card

Profile
- Position: Quarterback

Personal information
- Born: February 23, 1933; Amherst, Texas, U.S.
- Died: October 14, 2018 (aged 85); Campbell, Texas, U.S.
- Listed height: 5 ft 10 in (1.78 m)
- Listed weight: 185 lb (84 kg)

Career information
- College: East Texas State
- AFL draft: 1960

Career history
- Oakland Raiders (1960)*
- * Offseason or practice squad member only

Awards and highlights
- 2× First-team Little All-America (1958–1959)

Samuel Ray McCord (February 23, 1933 – October 14, 2018), nicknamed Stumblin’ Sam, was an American football quarterback. He played college football at East Texas State College, where he was a two-time Associated Press first-team Little All-America selection.

== Early life ==
Samuel Ray McCord was born on February 23, 1933, in Amherst, Texas. Due to his family moving twice in high school, he was only able to play one year of high school football: his junior year. He graduated from Wilmer-Hutchins High School in Dallas, Texas, in 1951. McCord then served in the United States Army during the Korean War, and was stationed at Fort Hood.

== College career ==
In 1956, McCord sent a letter to the head coach at Paris Junior College, where McCord's brother was playing college football, in order to ask for a tryout. McCord made the team as the starting quarterback and earned a scholarship.

McCord then transferred to East Texas State College, where he was a three-year starter for the East Texas State Lions from 1957 to 1959. He acquired the nickname "Stumblin’ Sam" while at East Texas State due to his ability to gain extra yardage after being hit. McCord led the Lions to Tangerine Bowl victories in back-to-back seasons from 1957 to 1958, earning MVP honors in the latter game. The Lions won the Lone Star Conference (LSC) title in 1957 and 1958 while also tying for the title in 1959. As a senior in 1959, McCord passed for 559 yards and 13 touchdowns, rushed for an LSC-leading 887 yards, handled punting, and was also the team's best defensive back with four interceptions. He led the team in total offense all three years. He also led the team in punting from 1958 to 1959. McCord was named an Associated Press first-team Little All-American for both the 1958 and 1959 seasons. He had an overall record of 28–3 while at East Texas State. He was described as a "living legend". After his college career, McCord was invited to the 1960 Optimist Bowl for college all-stars.

== Professional career ==
In late 1959, McCord was selected by the Minneapolis team of the American Football League (AFL) in the league's inaugural draft. Minneapolis later withdrew from the AFL and their draft picks were given to the Oakland Raiders. As a 27-year-old rookie, McCord was one of eight players who competed for the Raiders' quarterback job in 1960. He was released by Oakland on July 13, 1960.

== Post-playing career ==
McCord later coached high school football in Texas and was an assistant coach at East Texas State. He also served as East Texas State's Chief of Traffic Safety and Security. He was the primary organizer for the school's athletic hall of fame, which inducted its first class in 1978. McCord himself was inducted as part of the class of 1981. He retired in 1992 as East Texas State's Alumni Director. He was inducted into the Lone Star Conference Hall of Honor in 2006.

McCord died on October 14, 2018, at his home in Campbell, Texas.
