= 1958 Little All-America college football team =

American college football all-star team

The 1958 Little All-America college football team is composed of college football players from small colleges and universities who were selected by the Associated Press (AP) as the best players at each position. For 1958, the AP selected three teams of 11 players each, with no separate defensive platoons.

The first-team backfield included: quarterback John Greene who led Chattanooga to an upset victory over Tennessee; Robert Webb of St. Ambrose who gained 1,592 yards; and Ed Meador of Arkansas Tech who averaged 150 yards per game.

Guard Carlos Gonzales of Cal Poly was the only junior chosen for the first team and the heaviest player selected at 230 pounds.

== First team ==
Position	Player	Team
B	John Greene	Chattanooga
B	Sam McCord	East Texas
B	Robert Webb	St. Ambrose
B	Ed Meador	Arkansas Tech
E	Robert Yencho	Mississippi Southern
E	Tom Taylor	Albion
T	Richard Emerich	West Chester
T	Robert Baake	Wheaton (IL)
G	Carlos Gonzalez	Cal Poly
G	Charles Davis	McMurry
C	William Long	Willamette

== Second team ==
Position	Player	Team
B	William Benson	Hampden–Sydney
B	Charles Tolar	Northwestern Louisiana
B	Wesley Gideon	Trinity (TX)
B	George Dixon	Bridgeport
E	Jerry Richardson	Wofford
E	Peter Kasson	Ripon
T	Larry Termolen	Hope
T	Glenn Morgan	Flagstaff State
G	Larry Palvino	Rochester
G	Claude Pellingsly	Northeastern Oklahoma
C	Michael Banyas	East Tennessee State

== Third team ==
Position	Player	Team
B	William Berrier	Juniata
B	Junior Wolfe	Panhandle A&M
B	Robert Swiggum	Gustavus Adolphus
B	Fred Cason	Tampa
E	Nicholas Bottini	Buffalo
E	Joe Driskill	Northeast Louisiana
T	Richard Cahill	Humboldt State
T	Larry MaGuire	Central Washington
G	George Worley	St. Benedict's (KS)
G	James Hardin	Western Kentucky
C	Joe Murphy	Lenoir–Rhyne

== See also ==
- 1958 College Football All-America Team
