= John Paluck =

American football player (1935–2003)

No. 85, 86
- Position: Defensive end

Personal information
- Born: May 3, 1935; Swoyersville, Pennsylvania, U.S.
- Died: April 22, 2003 (aged 67); Fairfax, Virginia, U.S.
- Listed height: 6 ft 2 in (1.88 m)
- Listed weight: 241 lb (109 kg)

Career information
- High school: Swoyersville
- College: Pittsburgh
- NFL draft: 1956: 2nd round, 24th overall pick

Career history
- Washington Redskins (1956, 1959–1965)

Awards and highlights
- Second-team All-Pro (1964); Pro Bowl (1964); Second-team All-American (1955); First-team All-Eastern (1955)

Career NFL statistics
- Fumble recoveries: 14
- Interceptions: 2
- Touchdowns: 1
- Stats at Pro Football Reference

John Joseph Paluck (May 23, 1935 – April 22, 2003) was an American professional football player who was a defensive lineman for the Washington Redskins of the National Football League (NFL). He went to one Pro Bowl during his nine-year career. Paluck played college football for the Pittsburgh Panthers and was selected in the second round of the 1956 NFL draft.

A second-round draft pick, Paluck was lost to the military for the 1957 and 1958 seasons. He rejoined the Redskins for the 1959 season to become one of the NFL's top defensive performers. His rugged style of play earned him the nickname of "Gentle John." He scored the only touchdown of his career as a rookie, returning a fumble 76 yards against the New York Giants at Yankee Stadium.
