= Off Limits =

Off Limits may refer to:

== Arts and entertainment ==
- Off Limits (1953 film), a comedy film starring Bob Hope and Mickey Rooney
- Off Limits (1988 film), a mystery/thriller film starring Willem Dafoe and Gregory Hines
- Off Limits (TV series), a 2011 TV series on the Travel Channel starring Don Wildman
- "Off Limits", an episode of Yanks Go Home
- Off Limits (album), a 1971 album by the Kenny Clarke-Francy Boland Big Band
- Off Limits (anthology), a 1997 collection of science fiction stories
- Off Limits, an Italian music production company run by Larry Pignagnoli

== See also ==
- Out of bounds (disambiguation)
