= Jim Larkin (American football) =

American football player and coach (born 1939)

Biographical details
- Born: February 7, 1939 (age 87)

Playing career
- 1960: Hillsdale
- Position: Tackle

Coaching career (HC unless noted)
- 1980–1982: Saginaw Valley State

Head coaching record
- Overall: 9–22

Accomplishments and honors

Awards
- As a player: Second-team Little All-American (1959)

Jim Larkin (born February 7, 1939) is an American former football player and coach. Larkin was the head football coach at Saginaw Valley State University in University Center, Michigan for three seasons, from 1980 until 1982. His coaching record at Saginaw Valley State was 9–22.
