= 1955 All-Eastern football team =

American college all-star team

The 1955 All-Eastern football team consists of American football players chosen by various selectors as the best players at each position among the Eastern colleges and universities during the 1955 college football season.

== Quarterbacks ==
- George Welsh, Navy (AP-1 [b], UP-1, INS-1)
- Claude Benham, Columbia (AP-2, INS-2)

== Halfbacks ==
- Jim Brown, Syracuse (AP-1 [b], UP-1, INS-1)
- Lenny Moore, Penn State (AP-1 [b], UP-1, INS-1)
- Patrick Uebel, Army (AP-2, INS-2)
- Alfred Ward, Yale (AP-2)
- Jim Robertson, Cornell (INS-2)
- Dennis McGill, Yale (UP-1, INS-2)

== Fullbacks ==
- Charles Sticka, Trinity (NC) (AP-1 [b], INS-1)
- R. Martin, Princeton (AP-2)

== Ends ==
- Ron Beagle, Navy (AP-1, UP-1, INS-1)
- John Paluck, Pittsburgh (AP-1, UP-1, INS-2)
- Joe Walton, Pittsburgh (INS-1)
- Monte Pascoe, Dartmouth (AP-2)
- Jimmy Ridlon, Syracuse (AP-2)
- Joe Direnzo, Princeton (INS-2)

== Tackles ==
- Phil Tarasovic, Yale (AP-1, INS-1)
- Thomas Powell, Colgate (AP-1, UP-1, INS-2)
- Bill Doremus, Lehigh (INS-1)
- John Hopkins, Navy (AP-2, UP-1)
- James McGuinness, Brown (AP-2)
- Charles Gibbons, Rhode Island (INS-2)

== Guards ==
- Bill Meigs, Harvard (AP-1, INS-1)
- Stanley Slater, Army (AP-1, UP-1, INS-2)
- Jim Buonopane, Holy Cross (AP-2, UP-1, INS-1)
- Robert Howard, Rutgers (AP-2)
- George Peck, Princeton (INS-2)

== Center ==
- John Cenci, Pittsburgh (AP-1)
- Frank Reich, Penn State (INS-1)
- Edward Szvetecz, Army (UP-1)
- Robert A'Lizzi, Dartmouth (AP-2)
- Bill Brown, Syracuse (INS-2)

== Key ==
- AP = Associated Press
- UP = United Press
- INS = International News Service

== See also ==
- 1955 College Football All-America Team
