= Joe Driskill =

American football player (1937–2003)

- Driskill, circa 1958

No. 45
- Position: Defensive back

Personal information
- Born: August 10, 1937; Arcadia, Louisiana, U.S.
- Died: September 11, 2003 (aged 66); Durham, North Carolina, U.S.
- Listed height: 6 ft 1 in (1.85 m)
- Listed weight: 195 lb (88 kg)

Career information
- High school: Arcadia
- College: Northeast Louisiana State
- NFL draft: 1959: undrafted

Career history
- Chicago Cardinals (1959)*; Ottawa Rough Riders (1959); St. Louis Cardinals (1960–1961); St. Louis Cardinals (1964)*
- * Offseason or practice squad member only

Awards and highlights
- Third-team Little All-America (1958); 2× First-team All-GSC (1957, 1958); Second-team All-GSC (1956); Third-team All-GSC (1955)
- Stats at Pro Football Reference

Joseph Guyon Driskill (August 10, 1937 – September 11, 2003) was an American professional football defensive back who played for the St. Louis Cardinals of the National Football League (NFL). He played college football for the Northeast Louisiana State Indians.

== Early life ==
Joseph Guyon Driskill was born on August 10, 1937, in Arcadia, Louisiana. He attended Arcadia High School.

== College career ==
Driskill enrolled at Northeast Louisiana State College to play college football for the Indians. He was a four-year letterman from 1955 to 1958 as an end. He led the team in receptions from 1956 to 1958, catching six passes for 107 yards and two touchdowns in 1956, seven passes for 85 yards and three touchdowns in 1957, and 12 passes for 316 yards and three touchdowns in 1958. Driskill earned Associated Press third-team Little All-American honors in 1958. He was named third-team All-Gulf States Conference (GSC) in 1955, second-team All-GSC in 1956, and first-team All-GSC in both 1957 and 1958. He was the only player in school history to earn all-conference honors four times. Driskill was an ROTC student in college. He was inducted into the school's athletics hall of fame in 1980.

== Professional career ==
At 6'0" and 180 pounds, Driskill was thought to be too small to play end in the NFL. At the 1958 All-American Bowl, a college football all-star game, Driskill's college coaches requested that he be allowed to play defensive back in the bowl. Playing defensive back, Driskill caught the attention of the Chicago Cardinals. He went undrafted in the 1959 NFL draft, and signed with the Cardinals on April 9, 1959. He was converted to corner linebacker. He was released during the preseason.

On September 18, 1959, it was reported that Driskill had signed with the Ottawa Rough Riders of the Interprovincial Rugby Football Union. He was released by the Rough Riders in October 1959 before ever playing for them. In mid-October 1959, he was playing touch football in Monroe, Louisiana.

On February 11, 1960, Driskill signed with the Cardinals for the 1960 season. He suffered a foot injury in mid-October 1960 but returned later. He played in six or ten games, starting four, overall for the Cardinals in 1960 as a left cornerback. On May 18, 1961, Driskill re-signed with St. Louis for the 1961 season. He appeared in all 14 games, starting three, in 1961 and was listed as a safety. In July 1962, it was reported that Driskill would miss the 1962 season due to United States Army service. He returned from the army in July 1964 after two years at Fort Hood, "most of it as a first lieutenant and commander of a tank company." The Columbia Missourian noted that Driskill had a "heavy touch" of gray in his hair, as to which he replied that he started graying at 19. He was released on August 19, 1964, after the second of five preseason games.

== Personal life ==
Driskill spent 30 years in the military after his NFL career, including two tours of duty in Vietnam and commanding a base in Germany. He was forced to retire due to emphysema, ending his military career as a colonel. He had a lung transplant in 2000. Driskill died on September 11, 2003, at Duke Medical Center in Durham, North Carolina.
