= Dan Radakovich (American football) =

American football player and coach (1935–2020)

Personal information
- Born: November 26, 1935; Duquesne, Pennsylvania, U.S.
- Died: February 20, 2020 (aged 84); Moon, Pennsylvania, U.S.
- Listed height: 6 ft 2 in (1.88 m)
- Listed weight: 203 lb (92 kg)

Career information
- College: Penn State
- NFL draft: 1957: 17th round, 194th overall pick

Career history
- Penn State (1957–1969) Assistant; Cincinnati (1970) Assistant; Pittsburgh Steelers (1971) Defensive line; Colorado (1972–1973) Defensive coordinator / linebackers; Pittsburgh Steelers (1974–1977) Offensive line; San Francisco 49ers (1978) Defensive coordinator / linebackers; Los Angeles Rams (1979–1981) Linebackers; NC State (1982) Assistant; Denver Broncos (1983) Linebackers; Minnesota Vikings (1984) Linebackers; New York Jets (1985) Linebackers; New York Jets (1986–1988) Offensive line; Cleveland Browns (1989–1990) Defensive coordinator / linebackers; Robert Morris (1994) Defensive coordinator; St. Louis Rams (1995) Linebackers; London Monarchs (1997) Assistant; Robert Morris (1996–2007) Defensive coordinator

Awards and highlights
- 2× Super Bowl champion (IX, X); Second-team All-Eastern (1956)
- Coaching profile at Pro Football Reference

Dan Radakovich (November 26, 1935 – February 20, 2020) was an American football player and coach. He helped coach the Pittsburgh Steelers to multiple Super Bowl wins in the 1970s as the team's offensive line coach. He spent 48 years in collegiate and professional coaching before his retirement in 2008.

Radakovich graduated from Pennsylvania State University in 1957, and immediately began working on the coaching staff of the Nittany Lions, which he continued until 1969. He went to Cincinnati in 1970, and joined the Steelers in 1971.

Described as "lean, and blond, a center in his playing days", Radakovich was "a Western Pennsylvania guy who had been on Noll's staff in 1971 but resigned to take a coaching job in college football". Radakovich subsequently returned to working with professional football, where he helped persuade Chuck Noll to draft Franco Harris out of Penn State.

After a stint in Colorado, he coached the Steelers' offensive line from 1974 to 1977. In 1978, Radakovich left Pittsburgh to work on the coaching staff of the San Francisco 49ers, then switched to the Los Angeles Rams in 1979. His last position was as an assistant with Robert Morris University. Radakovich died in 2020 at the age of 84.
