= 1956 All-Eastern football team =

American all-star college football team

The 1956 All-Eastern football team consists of American football players chosen by various selectors as the best players at each position among the Eastern colleges and universities during the 1956 college football season.

Five players were unanimously named to the first team by the Associated Press (AP), United Press (UP), and International News Service (INS): halfback Jim Brown of Syracuse; fullback Bob Kyasky of Army; end Joe Walton of Pitt; guard Sam Valentine of Penn State; and Wilson Whitmire of Navy.

== Backs ==
- Jim Brown, Syracuse (AP-1, UP-1, INS-1 [hb])
- Bob Kyasky, Army (AP-1, UP-1, INS-1 [fb])
- Milt Plum, Penn State (AP-1, UP-1, INS-2)
- Dennis McGill, Yale (AP-1, UP-2, INS-1 [hb])
- Guy Martin, Colgate (UP-1)
- Claude Benham, Columbia (UP-3, INS-1 [qb])
- Cornelius Salvaterra, Pittsburgh (AP-2, UP-2)
- Jimmy Ridlon, Syracuse (AP-2, UP-2)
- John Sapoch, Princeton (AP-2, UP-2)
- Alfred Ward, Yale (AP-2, INS-2)
- Tommy Morris, Princeton (INS-2)
- Steve Ackerman, Yale (INS-2)
- Irv Robertson, Cornell (UP-3)
- Ned Oldham, Navy (UP-3)
- Jim Stehlin, Brandeis (UP-3)

== Ends ==
- Joe Walton, Pittsburgh (AP-1, UP-1, INS-1)
- Paul Lopata, Yale (AP-1, UP-1)
- Dick Arcand, Holy Cross (UP-3, INS-1)
- Dick Lasse, Syracuse (AP-2, UP-2)
- Austin Short, Lehigh (AP-2)
- Al Jamison, Colgate (UP-2, INS-2)
- Thurlow Cooper, Maine (UP-3)
- Lon Fraser, Dartmouth (INS-2)

== Tackles ==
- Bob Pollock, Pittsburgh (AP-1, UP-1)
- George Kurker, Tufts (AP-1)
- Frank Solani, Colgate (INS-1)
- Mike Bowman, Princeton (INS-1)
- Gilbert Robertshaw, Brown (AP-2, UP-2, INS-2)
- Bob Reifsnyder, Navy (AP-2)
- Walt Mazur, Penn State (UP-2)
- Don Luzzi, Villanova (INS-2)
- Robert Casciola, Princeton (UP-3)
- Wayne Kakela, Dartmouth (UP-3)

== Guards ==
- Sam Valentine, Penn State (AP-1, UP-1, INS-1)
- Lou Lovely, Boston University (AP-1, UP-1 [t], INS-2)
- Stan Slater, Army (AP-2, UP-1)
- John Owselchik, Yale (UP-2, INS-1)
- James Hower, Navy (AP-2, UP-3)
- Vince Scorsone, Pittsburgh (UP-2)
- Ed Bailey, Syracuse (INS-2)
- Tino Bertolini, Boston College (UP-3)

== Center ==
- Wilson Whitmire, Navy (AP-1, UP-1, INS-1)
- Dan Radakovich, Penn State (AP-2, UP-2, INS-2)
- Bill Brown, Syracuse (UP-3)

== Key ==
- AP = Associated Press
- UP = United Press
- INS = International News Service

== See also ==
- 1956 College Football All-America Team
