= Eddie Meador =

American football player (1937–2023)

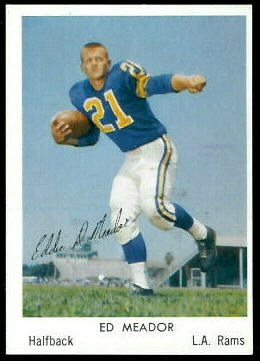
- Meador in 1959

No. 21
- Position: Defensive back

Personal information
- Born: August 10, 1937; Dallas, Texas, U.S.
- Died: September 4, 2023 (aged 86); Russellville, Arkansas, U.S.
- Listed height: 5 ft 11 in (1.80 m)
- Listed weight: 193 lb (88 kg)

Career information
- High school: Russellville
- College: Arkansas Tech (1955–1958)
- NFL draft: 1959: 7th round, 80th overall pick

Career history
- Los Angeles Rams (1959–1970)

Awards and highlights
- 2× First-team All-Pro (1968, 1969); 3× Second-team All-Pro (1960, 1963, 1967); 6× Pro Bowl (1960, 1964–1968); NFL 1960s All-Decade Team; First-team Little All-American (1958); Arkansas Sports Hall of Fame (1978)

Career NFL statistics
- Interceptions: 46
- Fumble recoveries: 22
- Touchdowns: 6
- Stats at Pro Football Reference

Eddie Doyle Meador (August 10, 1937 – September 4, 2023) was an American professional football player who was a cornerback for the Los Angeles Rams of the National Football League (NFL) from 1959 to 1970.

== High school ==
Meador graduated from Russellville High School (RHS) in 1955 as an All-Region and All-State football player. He was a three-sport letterman in football, basketball, and track at RHS, and the Cyclones won the Region 3AA football championship in 1954. He is a member of the RHS Athletic Hall of Fame.

== College ==
Meador attended Arkansas Tech University (ATU) in Russellville, Arkansas. During his college football career (1955–58), Meador seldom left the playing field because he was the tailback, a defensive back, a return specialist, and a co-captain for the Arkansas Tech Wonder Boys. In addition to football, Meador played basketball and ran track for ATU.

Meador was named All-Conference in the Arkansas Intercollegiate Conference (AIC) in 1957–58 and was named Little All-American following his senior season at Tech. His collegiate career includes rushing for 3,410 yards and scoring 259 points. Tech won the AIC championship in 1958.

There were other tremendous single-game, single-season, and career achievements that resulted in unofficially setting 19 collegiate records, which have since been surpassed. To cap off his career, Meador was invited to play in the Optimist Bowl in Tucson, where all-star-caliber football players from Division I were pitted against all-star-caliber football players from smaller colleges. Playing alongside all-star teammates such as John Madden and John Wooten, Meador's team was narrowly defeated by the players of Division I. He was voted Arkansas Amateur Athlete of the Year in 1958. In 1959 Meador graduated with a teaching degree (Social Studies and Physical Education).

== NFL ==
Meador was drafted in the seventh round of the 1959 NFL draft, as the 80th pick overall. He was a starter as a rookie at cornerback and was voted the Rams' Defensive Rookie of the Year. Meador was voted to the Pro Bowl the following season, as well as being named second-team All-Pro. In 1961 Meador tied for the NFL lead in fumbles recovered with 5 and was named All-Conference by The Sporting News. The following season, 1962, Meador was honorable mention All-Pro and set a Ram record by blocking 4 kicks.

In 1963, Meador was second-team All-Pro and intercepted six passes. In 1964 Meador was moved from cornerback to free safety. He recorded 95 tackles and was named All-Conference by The Sporting News (an honor he would receive every year from 1964 through 1969). In 1965, he led the Rams with 126 tackles and was named second-team All-Pro for the third time. He was the holder for the Rams placekicks and on a fake field goal attempt he ran 17 yards for a touchdown.

In 1966, Meador picked off 5 passes, recovered 3 fumbles logged 97 tackles on an improving 8–6 Rams team, that was headed by George Allen. The following season Meador had 100 tackles, intercepted 8 passes (returning 2 for touchdowns) and was named first-team All-Pro for the first time in his career. It was an honor he would also receive in both 1968 and 1969. In 1969 Meador logged 102 tackles and picked off 5 passes while making first-team All-Pro for the third time in as many seasons. He was tied for 10th all-time in interceptions when he retired in 1970.

“Eddie Meador was one of the finest defensive backs l have ever seen. Outstanding in coverage and a fierce tackler, he had a remarkable nose for the football that allowed him to come up with big plays again and again during his career with the Rams. He was also a fine leader and one of my favorite teammates.”
Merlin Olsen

== Legacy ==
Meador retired after the 1970 season. He is still the Rams all-time interception leader (with 46) and holds the team record for most opponents fumbles recovered (18) and blocked the most kicks in team history with 10. Along the way Meador was voted the Rams "defensive back of the year" seven times and was named to the Los Angeles Rams All-Time team in both 1970 and 1985 and voted to the NFL's All-Decade Team for the 1960s.

Meador was a three-time First-team All-Pro and a three-time Second-team All-Pro. In addition he was a seven-time All-Western conference selection by The Sporting News to match his six Pro Bowl Selections.

- Named as the NFL Players Association President (1969–1970)
- Inducted into the Arkansas Tech University Hall of Distinction (1969)
- Awarded the NFL Father of the Year (1969)
- Awarded the NFLPA Byron 'Whizzer' White Award (1969)
- Elected to the Helms Athletic Foundation Sports Hall of Fame (1972)
- Elected to the Arkansas Sports Hall of Fame (1978)
- NAIA Collegiate Hall of Fame member

Despite his accolades, Meador has yet to be a finalist for the Pro Football Hall of Fame. He remains the only cornerback from the 1960s All-Decade Team not enshrined. In 2012, the Professional Football Researchers Association named Meador to the PRFA Hall of Very Good Class of 2012.

== Death ==
Meador died on September 4, 2023, at the age of 86.
