= Cleveland Summit =

1967 meeting of African-American athletes

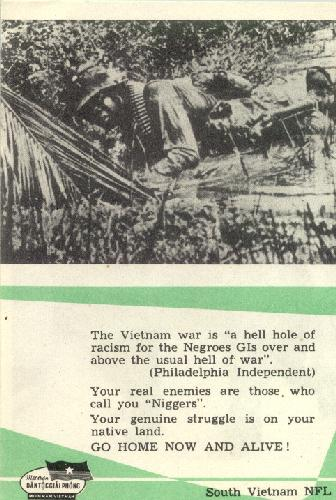
The Vietnam war is "a hell hole of racism for the Negroes GIs over and above the usual hell of war," a quote from The Philadelphia Independent on an anti-war poster

The Cleveland Summit, also known as the Muhammad Ali Summit, was a meeting on Sunday, June 4, 1967, among twelve leading African-American men, eleven athletes and one politician, on the East Side of Cleveland, Ohio. Football star Jim Brown organized it in response to Muhammad Ali's refusal, a month earlier, to enter the draft for the Vietnam War. The participants expressed support for Ali's decision in a press conference following the summit.

== Preparation ==
According to one account, the idea for the meeting came about when Ali's manager, Jabir Herbert Muhammad, asked Brown whether he would meet with Ali to assess his plans. Brown said, "I came up with the concept of having Ali meet with the top black athletes. We had a desire to find out the truth about his protest." Wooten invited the athletes.

== Meeting ==
=== Venue ===
The meeting took place in an office at 10511 Euclid Avenue, alternatively described as the Negro Industrial Building or an office of the Negro Industrial Economic Union, an African-American empowerment organization founded by Brown and later called the Black Economic Union. Its location is now occupied by an office of the American Cancer Society.

=== Participants ===
- Kareem Abdul-Jabbar
- Muhammad Ali
- Walter Beach
- Jim Brown
- Willie Davis
- Curtis McClinton
- Bobby Mitchell
- Bill Russell
- Jim Shorter
- Carl Stokes
- Sidney Williams
- John Wooten

=== Initial attitudes and intentions ===
Several participants entered the meeting skeptical of Ali's position against performing military service. Some were suspicious of the Nation of Islam. Most were military veterans - at least eight of the eleven, according to Robert Anthony Bennett III's doctoral thesis, which identifies the military service of Beach, Brown, McClinton, Mitchell, Shorter, Stokes, Williams, and Wooten, and also notes that Davis and Russell had undertaken U.S. Government goodwill missions, in the case of Davis to visit U.S. troops in Vietnam.

Some accounts say that the participants' original purpose was to encourage Ali to reach a compromise with the U.S. Government. A 2012 Plain Dealer article reported that "[a]lthough it wasn't discussed as a group before the meeting, many of the men planned to convince Ali to accept his call to the military." That is how the press reported the Summit at the time: as an unsuccessful attempt to convince Ali to perform his military service, under headlines such as "Athletes Fail To Talk Ali Into The Army" and "Athletes Fail to Sway Clay."

Ali's biographer Jonathan Eig reported in 2017, as Branson Wright did in the Plain Dealer in 2012, that boxing promoter Bob Arum had negotiated a deal with the government that draft-evasion charges against Ali would be dropped if Ali agreed to perform a series of boxing exhibitions for U.S. troops. Brown and two Nation of Islam leaders reportedly had a financial stake in this planned arrangement, and "other black athletes" (presumably those in the Summit) would also be financially rewarded if they convinced Ali to accept it. Some saw the original purpose of the Summit as to convince Ali to accept this deal.

By contrast, Beach said, "None of us had any idea of trying to change Ali's mind. The meeting was there to support his position." Along similar lines, Brown told The New York Times a few days after the Summit, "We approached [Ali] on the basis that we were his friends, willing to give him any assistance we could. No one would pressure him. It would be a give-and-take, pro-and-con discussion."

=== Discussion ===
Reports and recollections vary widely on the length of the meeting among the participants, ranging from the contemporaneous Washington Post report that the group met "for 1-1/2 hours" to Wooten's recollection that the group "sat down for about six or seven hours." Brown said "we met for about five hours," and in another interview Wooten said "about three hours." The latter recollection matches the statements that the discussion started at about 3pm, and adjourned for the press conference at about 6pm.

Wooten, on a 2021 podcast, described how Russell and McClinton "grilled" Ali about his decision during the Summit and Ali's responses. Mitchell said, "During those hours, he said he was sincere, and his religion was important to him. He convinced all of us, even someone like me, who was suspicious. We weren't easy on him. We wanted Ali to understand what he was getting himself into. He convinced us that he was."

=== Press conference ===
While accounts disagree regarding whether or not the participants intended at the beginning of the meeting to change Ali's mind, all descriptions agree that by the end of the meeting, they took a position of supporting Ali. According to a 2021 article, after Ali "wouldn't budge after hours of questioning, they decided to stand by him." As journalist and filmmaker Branson Wright described their conclusion: "They said, 'We're going to support him. We're going to support his right to be a conscientious objector.' And they had that press conference afterward and showing that support."

== Significance ==
Ali was a "pariah" in American society at the time because he refused to join the military, his boxing license had been revoked, and he faced up to five years in prison. For the eleven other participants to stand with Ali in support of him and his position was thus an act of courage that put "their reputations and their careers" at risk.

The Cleveland Summit has been called "a significant turning point for the role of the athlete in society" and "one of the most important civil rights acts in sports history" as well as a predecessor of the twenty-first century protest movement initiated by Colin Kaepernick.

Wooten said he offered to organize a similar show of support for Kaepernick, but his offer was declined: "I went to his agents, his representatives, and I said, 'Let me talk to Colin. And if he agrees, I'll have people—Jim Brown, Paul Warfield, Leroy Kelly, Cris Carter, Ray Lewis—I'll have people that will stand behind him just as we did Ali.' And they came back and said Colin doesn't want to do that."

William C. Rhoden of The New York Times described the Summit in 2014 as "the first — and last — time that so many African-American athletes at that level came together to support a controversial cause."

A photo of the press conference at the Cleveland Summit is well-known. It is described by Cleveland City Council member Ken Conwell as hanging, fifty years later, "in every beauty shop and barber shop in the Glenville community."

In December 2016 Sports Illustrated magazine awarded its Muhammad Ali Legacy Award, the first one awarded after Ali's death, given to an athlete who "best embodies the ideals of sportsmanship, leadership, and philanthropy as vehicles for changing the world," to the three most famous athletes who joined Ali at the summit, those seated next to him in the front row of the famous picture: Abdul-Jabbar, Brown, and Russell. As of 2021, however, Sports Illustrated had dropped Brown from the list of recipients.

== Commemoration ==
On June 17, 2022, marking the 55th anniversary of the Cleveland Summit, a commemorative plaque was unveiled at the site of the Summit (10501 Euclid Avenue, in Cleveland), in a ceremony organized by the National Basketball Social Justice Coalition and attended by Beach, Dikembe Mutombo, and Cleveland mayor Justin Bibb.

In September 2023, an Ohio historical marker commemorating the Summit, part of the Cleveland Civil Rights Trail, was unveiled at the Cleveland Browns stadium. The plaque called the Summit "Cleveland's Ali Summit" and the "Cleveland Ali Summit," and described it as "one of the most important civil rights acts in sports history."

On October 11, 2023, a sculpture created by the Marcus Graham Project, consisting of a mural and a replica of the press conference table, was added to the commemorative plaque at the building where the Summit occurred.
