= 1959 Little All-America college football team =

American college football all-star team

The 1959 Little All-America college football team is composed of college football players from small colleges and universities who were selected by the Associated Press (AP) as the best players at each position. For 1959, the AP selected three teams of 11 players each, with no separate defensive platoons.

Quarterback Sam McCord from East Texas passed for 559 yards and 13 touchdowns, rushed for 887 yards, handled punting, and was also the team's best defensive back with four interceptions.

Walt Beach of Central Michigan had 542 rushing yards, 222 receiving yards, and 522 yards on kick returns, and scored 88 points.

Bill Larson led Western Illinois to a perfect 9–0 record, rushing for 890 yards and scoring 76 points.

Vince Tesone of Colorado Mines passed for 1,619 yards, rushed for 492 yards and seven touchdowns, and punted for an average of 42.2 yards.

Center Roger LeClerc made 50 percent of the tackles for Trinity (Connecticut), intercepted five passes (returning two for touchdowns), and also handled punting and place-kicking. He later played eight years in the NFL.

== First team ==
Position	Player	Team
B	Sam McCord	East Texas
B	Walt Beach	Central Michigan
B	Vince Tesone	Colorado Mines
B	Bill Larson	Western Illinois
E	Hugh McInnis	Mississippi Southern
E	Tom Hackler	Tennessee Tech
T	Walt Meineke	Lehigh
T	Bob Zimpfer	Bowling Green
G	Gerald Lambert	Texas A&I
G	Marvin Cisneros	Willamette
C	Roger LeClerc	Trinity (CT)

== Second team ==
Position	Player	Team
B	Jim Sochor	San Francisco
B	Henry Hawk	Arkansas State
B	Bill Berrier	Juniata
B	Jack Turner	Delaware
E	John Simko	Augustana (SD)
E	Brady Luckett	Middle Tennessee
T	Bill Beck	Gustavus Adolphus
T	Jim Larkin	Hillsdale
G	George Dempster	Hofstra
G	Clarence Cheatham	Western Michigan
C	Curtis Miranda	Florida A&M

== Third team ==
Position	Player	Team
B	Lee Farmer	Lenoir–Rhyne
B	Bill Shockley	West Chester
B	Dale Mills	Kirksville State
B	Brad Hustad	Luther
B	George Phelps	Cornell (IA)
E	Al Badger	Southern Connecticut
E	Bill Wiljanen	Michigan Tech
T	Walt Stockslager	Butler
T	Jim Pater	Coe
G	Garvin Boggs	Chico State
G	Bill Odden	Presbyterian
C	Rich Max	Cal Poly

== See also ==
- 1959 College Football All-America Team
