= Out of Bounds (autobiography) =

1989 autobiography by Jim Brown and Steve Delsohn

- Author: Jim Brown; Steve Delsohn
- Language: English
- Genre: Autobiography
- Published: 1989
- Publisher: Zebra Books
- Publication place: United States
- Pages: 380

Out of Bounds is a 1989 American autobiography of actor and former professional football player Jim Brown. The book was co-written by Brown with Steve Delsohn.
