= Jim Shorter =

American football player (1938–2000)

No. 40, 47, 21
- Position: Cornerback

Personal information
- Born: June 8, 1939; Montgomery, Alabama, U.S.
- Died: June 1, 2000 (aged 60); Los Angeles, California, U.S.
- Listed height: 5 ft 11 in (1.80 m)
- Listed weight: 184 lb (83 kg)

Career information
- College: Detroit Mercy (1958-1961)
- NFL draft: 1962: 14th round, 193rd overall pick

Career history
- Cleveland Browns (1962–1963); Washington Redskins (1964–1967); Pittsburgh Steelers (1969); Houston Texans-Shreveport Steamer (1974)

Career NFL statistics
- Interceptions: 15
- Fumble recoveries: 8
- Total touchdowns: 1
- Stats at Pro Football Reference

James Shorter (June 8, 1938 – June 1, 2000) was an American football defensive back in the National Football League for the Cleveland Browns, Washington Redskins, and the Pittsburgh Steelers. He played college football at the University of Detroit and was drafted in the fourteenth round of the 1962 NFL draft.

He was a participant in the 1967 Cleveland Summit which was held in support of Muhammad Ali's draft refusal during the Vietnam War.
