= Jim Brown =

American football player and actor (1936–2023)

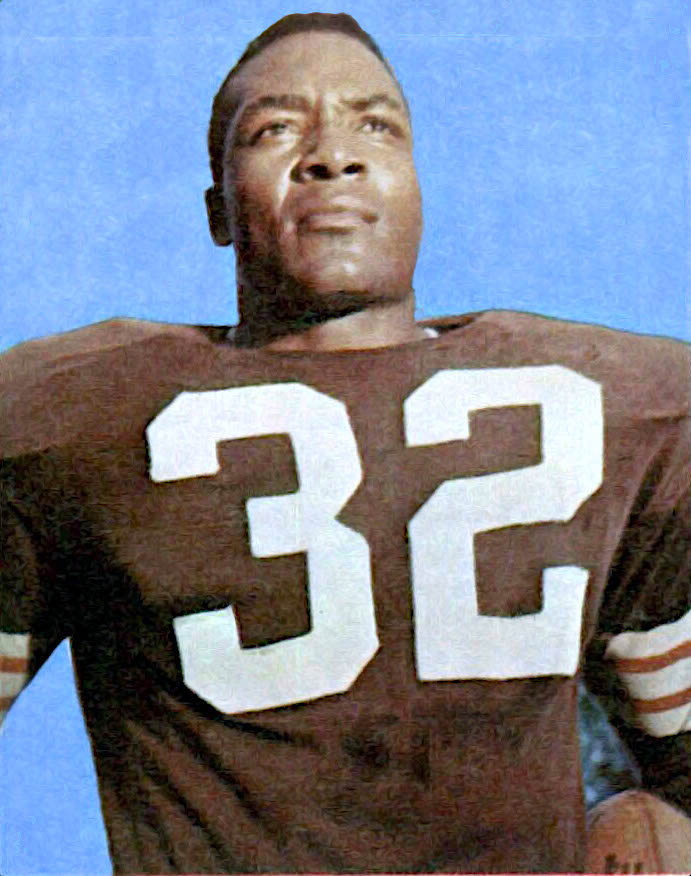
- Brown on a 1959 Topps football card, with the Browns uniform

No. 32
- Position: Fullback

Personal information
- Born: February 17, 1936; St. Simons, Georgia, U.S.
- Died: May 18, 2023 (aged 87); Los Angeles, California, U.S.
- Listed height: 6 ft 2 in (1.88 m)
- Listed weight: 232 lb (105 kg)

Career information
- High school: Manhasset (Manhasset, New York)
- College: Syracuse (1954–1956)
- NFL draft: 1957: 1st round, 6th overall pick

Career history
- Cleveland Browns (1957–1965)

Awards and highlights
- NFL champion (1964); 3× NFL Most Valuable Player (1957, 1958, 1965); NFL Rookie of the Year (1957); 8× First-team All-Pro (1957–1961, 1963–1965); Second-team All-Pro (1962); 9× Pro Bowl (1957–1965); 8× NFL rushing yards leader (1957–1961, 1963–1965); 5× NFL rushing touchdowns leader (1957–1959, 1963, 1965); NFL scoring leader (1958); NFL 1960s All-Decade Team; NFL 50th Anniversary All-Time Team; NFL 75th Anniversary All-Time Team; NFL 100th Anniversary All-Time Team; Hickok Belt (1964); Bert Bell Award (1963); Cleveland Browns Ring of Honor; Cleveland Browns No. 32 retired; Unanimous All-American (1956); Second-team All-American – INS (1955); Third-team All-American – AP, NEA (1955); NCAA rushing touchdowns co-leader (1956); NCAA average kickoff return yards leader (1955); 2× Unanimous first-team All-Eastern (1955, 1956); Walter Camp All-Time All-American; Syracuse All-Century Team; Syracuse Orange No. 44 retired; NFL records: Career rushing yards per game: 104.3; Career yards per carry (minimum 1,500 attempts): 5.22; Yards per carry in a season (minimum 200 attempts): 6.4 (1963); Most games with at least four touchdowns: 6

Career NFL statistics
- Rushing yards: 12,312
- Rushing average: 5.2
- Rushing touchdowns: 106
- Receptions: 262
- Receiving yards: 2,499
- Receiving touchdowns: 20
- Stats at Pro Football Reference
- Pro Football Hall of Fame
- College Football Hall of Fame

James Nathaniel Brown (February 17, 1936 – May 18, 2023) was an American professional football player, civil rights activist, and actor. He played as a fullback for the Cleveland Browns of the National Football League (NFL) from 1957 to 1965. Widely considered one of the greatest running backs of all time, as well as one of the greatest players in NFL history, Brown was selected to a Pro Bowl and All-Pro team every season he was in the league, and was recognized as the AP NFL Most Valuable Player three times. Brown won an NFL championship with the Browns in 1964. He led the league in rushing yards in eight out of his nine seasons, and by the time he retired, he held most major rushing records. In 1999, he was named the greatest professional football player ever by The Sporting News and the Associated Press.

Brown earned unanimous All-America honors playing college football at Syracuse University, where he was an all-around player when he played for the Syracuse Orangemen football team. The team later retired his number 44 jersey, and he was inducted into the College Football Hall of Fame in 1995. He is also widely considered one of the greatest lacrosse players of all time, and the Premier Lacrosse League MVP Award is named in his honor. Brown also excelled in basketball and track and field.

In his professional career, Brown carried the ball 2,359 times for 12,312 rushing yards and 106 touchdowns, which were all records when he retired. He averaged 104.3 rushing yards per game and is the only player in NFL history to average over 100 rushing yards per game for his career. Brown was enshrined in the Pro Football Hall of Fame in 1971. He was named to the NFL's 50th, 75th, and 100th Anniversary All-Time Teams, composed of the best players in NFL history. Brown was honored at the 2020 College Football Playoff National Championship as the greatest college football player of all time. His number 32 jersey is retired by the Browns.

Shortly before the end of his football career, Brown became an actor. He retired at the peak of his football career to pursue an acting career. He obtained 53 acting credits and several leading roles throughout the 1970s. He has been described as Hollywood's first black action hero and his role in the 1969 film 100 Rifles made cinematic history for featuring interracial love scenes.

Brown was one of the few athletes, and among the most prominent African Americans, to speak out on racial issues as the civil rights movement was growing in the 1950s. He participated in the Cleveland Summit after Muhammad Ali faced imprisonment for refusing to enter the draft for the Vietnam War, and he founded the Black Economic Union to help promote economic opportunities for minority-owned businesses. Brown later launched a foundation focused on diverting at-risk youth from violence through teaching them life skills, through which he facilitated the Watts truce between rival street gangs in Los Angeles.

== Early life ==
Brown was born on St. Simons Island, Georgia, to Swinton Brown, a professional boxer, and his wife, Theresa, a homemaker. He attended Manhasset Secondary School in Manhasset, New York. Brown earned 13 letters playing football, lacrosse, baseball, basketball, and running track.

Mr. Brown credits his self-reliance to having grown up on Saint Simons Island, a community off the coast of Georgia where he was raised by his grandmother and where racism did not affect him directly. At the age of eight, he moved to Manhasset, New York, on Long Island, where his mother worked as a domestic. It was at Manhasset High School that he became a football star and athletic legend.

— The New York Times – film review, 2002.

In football, he led Nassau County in scoring twice—in 1951 and 1952—and matched that feat in basketball, topping the county in scoring in both 1952 and 1953. His 38.1 points per game average in 1953 is still a Nassau County record.

His athletic prowess was such that he was even scouted by the New York Yankees and offered a minor league contract. Curious to test his abilities further, he prioritized baseball that spring and found some success pitching and playing first base, but decided his skills would not get him to the major leagues and ultimately sent his regrets to then-Yankees manager Casey Stengel.

== College career ==
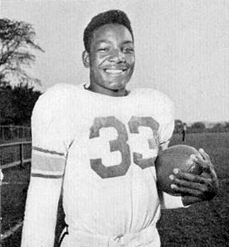
Brown in his senior season at Manhasset High School in New York

Lawyer and Syracuse University lacrosse star Kenneth Molloy, who was involved with the lacrosse program at Manhasset, was a benefactor of Brown and persuaded his alma mater to admit him, which was difficult because according to Molloy, "[Syracuse] did not want black athletes." Brown was the only African-American player on the football team as a freshman in 1953, and promises of a full scholarship in the second half of the year were not honored; Molloy personally financed and fundraised for Brown's first year at the school. He endured racist taunts while he was at Syracuse. Brown was treated differently from teammates: he was housed in a non-athlete dormitory, warned against dating Caucasian women, and the coaching staff attempted to put him at other positions, including punter, lineman, and wide receiver.

As a sophomore at Syracuse, Brown was the second-leading rusher on the team. As a junior, he rushed for 676 yards (5.2 per carry). In his senior year in 1956, Brown was a consensus first-team All-American. He finished fifth in the Heisman Trophy voting and set school records for highest season rush average (6.2) and most rushing touchdowns in a single game (6). He ran for 986 yards—third-most in the country despite Syracuse playing only eight games—and scored 14 touchdowns. In the regular-season finale, a 61–7 rout of Colgate, he rushed for 197 yards, scored six touchdowns, and kicked seven extra points for a then-NCAA-record 43 points. Then in the Cotton Bowl, he rushed for 132 yards, scored three touchdowns, and kicked three extra points, but a blocked extra point after Syracuse's third touchdown was the difference as TCU won 28–27.

In addition to his football accomplishments, he excelled in basketball, track, and especially lacrosse. As a sophomore, he was the second-leading scorer for the basketball team (15 ppg), and earned a letter on the track team. In 1955, he finished in fifth place in the decathlon at the USA Outdoor Track and Field Championships. His junior year, he averaged 11.3 points in basketball, and was named a second-team All-American in lacrosse. His senior year, he was named a first-team All-American in lacrosse with 43 goals in 10 games, tying for first in national scoring with Jack Daut, and was the first African-American to play in the North–South All Star Game. Brown was so dominant in the game, that lacrosse rules were changed requiring a lacrosse player to keep their stick in constant motion when carrying the ball (instead of holding it close to his body). There is currently no rule in lacrosse that requires a player to keep their stick in motion. In 1983, Brown was inducted into the National Lacrosse Hall of Fame. The JMA Wireless Dome has an 800-square-foot tapestry depicting Brown in football and lacrosse uniforms with the words "Greatest Player Ever."

Brown graduated with a Bachelor of Science degree and was named class marshal, leading his class in a parade to the stage for the commencement program. While in college, Brown participated in the Reserve Officers' Training Corps. After graduating, he was commissioned as a second lieutenant. During his time in the NFL, Brown continued his military commitment as a member of the United States Army Reserve. He served for four years and was discharged with the rank of captain.

== Professional career ==
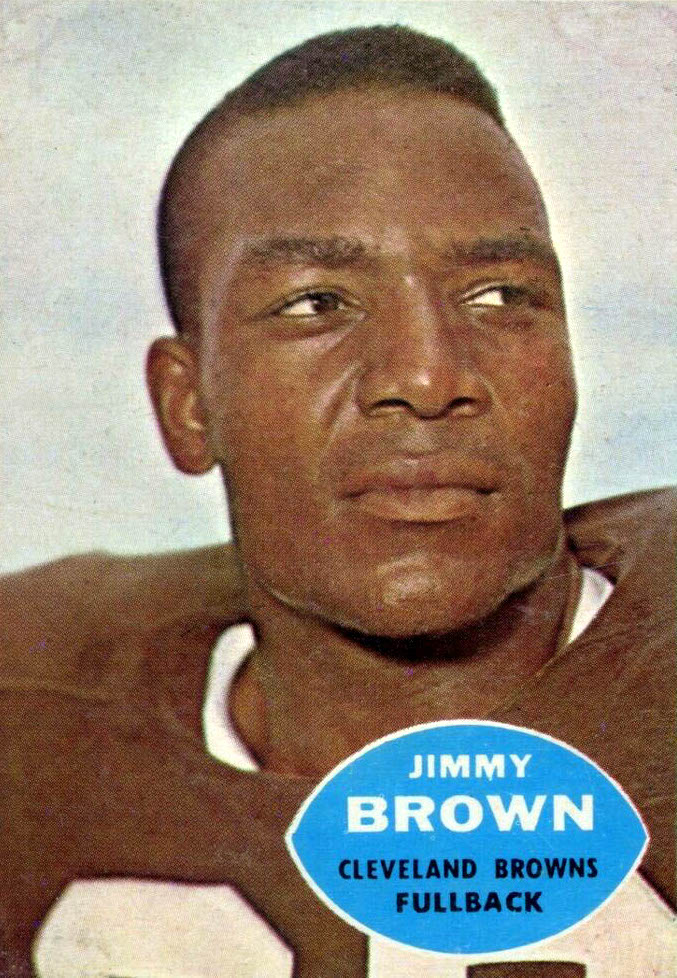
Brown on a 1960 Topps collectible card

In addition to being taken in the first round of the 1957 NFL draft by the Cleveland Browns with the sixth overall selection, Brown was selected in the ninth round of the 1957 NBA draft by the Syracuse Nationals with the 68th overall selection.

In the ninth game of his rookie season, against the Los Angeles Rams he rushed for 237 yards, setting an NFL single-game record that stood unsurpassed for 14 years (Note: Brown later matched his own record with 237 yards against the Philadelphia Eagles in 1961.) and a rookie record that remained for 40 years until Corey Dillon of the Cincinnati Bengals rushed for 246 yards in a week 15 game against the Tennessee Oilers.

Brown broke the single-season rushing record in 1958, gaining 1,527 yards in the 12-game season, shattering the previous NFL mark of 1,146 yards set by Steve Van Buren in 1949, as well as most rushing yards per game in a season, with 127.3. In this MVP season, Brown led all players with 17 touchdowns scored, nearly doubling his nearest rival, Baltimore Colts wide receiver Raymond Berry's, 9.

After nine years in the NFL, he departed as the league's record holder for both single-season (1,863 in 1963) and career rushing (12,312 yards), as well as the all-time leader in rushing touchdowns (106), total touchdowns (126), and all-purpose yards (15,549). He was the first player to reach the 100-rushing-touchdowns milestone, and only a few others have done so since, despite the league's expansion to a 16-game season in 1978 and 17-game season in 2021 (Brown's first four seasons were only 12 games, and his last five were 14 games).

Brown's record of scoring 100 touchdowns in only 93 games stood until LaDainian Tomlinson did it in 89 games during the 2006 season. Brown holds the record for total seasons leading the NFL in all-purpose yards (five: 1958–1961, 1964), and is the only rusher in NFL history to average over 100 yards per game for a career. In addition to his rushing, Brown was a superb receiver out of the backfield, catching 262 passes for 2,499 yards and 20 touchdowns, while also adding another 628 yards returning kickoffs. In every season he played, Brown was voted into the Pro Bowl, and he left the league in style by scoring three touchdowns in his final Pro Bowl game.

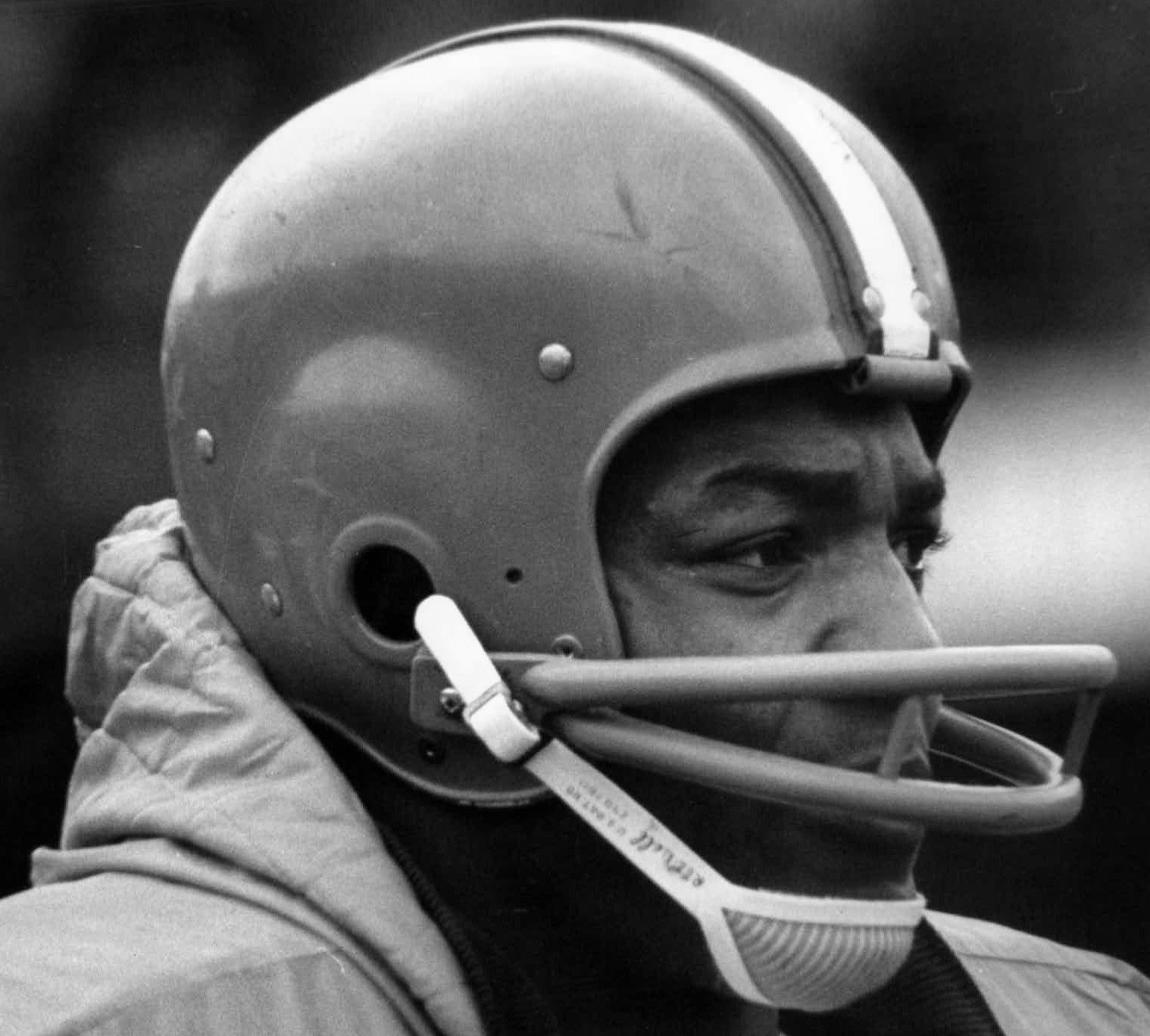
Brown in Cleveland

He told me, "Make sure when anyone tackles you he remembers how much it hurts." He lived by that philosophy and I always followed that advice.

— John Mackey, 1999

Brown was cognizant of the physical toll exacted by carrying the ball as a lead running back and began foreshadowing an early retirement as early as 1960, when the 24-year-old Brown told a journalist, "I've carried the ball 749 times in three years with the Browns. I get the same question everywhere I go — will so much ball-carrying and the tackling that results shorten my career? Will I end up my career groggy or, even worse, punchy as a punch-drunk prizefighter? ... I hope I'm smart enough to quit the game before somebody has to tell me I'm finished. I want to leave feeling I can still do the job. That's the way the great quarterback Otto Graham finished with the Browns. He most likely had several good seasons left... But Otto quit while he was on top. I hope I have the good sense to follow the example."

Brown's 1,863 rushing yards in the 1963 season remains a Cleveland franchise record. It is currently the oldest franchise record for rushing yards out of all 32 NFL teams. His average of 133 yards per game that season is exceeded only by O. J. Simpson's 1973 season. Brown led the league in rushing a record eight times. He was also the first NFL player to rush for over 10,000 yards. He was very difficult to tackle (shown by his all-time record of 5.22 yards per carry), often requiring more than one defender to bring him down. Brown was famous for his stiff arm and combined speed, power and relentless endurance as a rusher.

After winning his third league MVP award in 1965, Brown retired in July 1966 at age 30 while still in top form. He was in England for the shooting of the movie The Dirty Dozen. He had expected to return to the Browns afterwards, but retired when team owner Art Modell threatened him with fines for missing training camp. Brown held the NFL career rushing record of 12,312 yards until it was broken by Walter Payton on October 7, 1984, during Payton's 10th NFL season. Brown is still the Browns' all-time leading rusher. As of 2018, he ranked 11th on the all-time rushing list. Brown's NFL touchdown record would stand until 1994 when Jerry Rice surpassed him with his 127th touchdown.

During Brown's career, Cleveland won the NFL championship in 1964 and were runners-up in 1957 and 1965, his rookie and final season, respectively. In the 1964 championship game, Brown rushed 27 times for 114 yards and caught 3 passes for 37.

Brown never missed a game in his entire career. He refused to drink water during games, believing it would make him feel satisfied and diminish his drive.

== Acting career ==
Brown appeared in many movies and was at times described as a black Superman or a black John Wayne. While not considered a gifted actor, he helped to expand the range of roles available to black actors.

=== Early films ===
Brown began his acting career before the 1964 season, playing a buffalo soldier in a Western action film called Rio Conchos. The film premiered at Cleveland's Hippodrome theater on October 23, with Brown and many of his teammates in attendance. The reaction was lukewarm. Brown, one reviewer said, was a serviceable actor, but the movie's overcooked plotting and implausibility amounted to "a vigorous melodrama for the unsqueamish."

In early 1966, Brown was shooting his second film in London. MGM's The Dirty Dozen cast Brown as Robert Jefferson, one of 12 convicts sent to France during World War II to assassinate German officers meeting at a castle near Rennes in Brittany before the D-Day invasion. Production delays due to bad weather meant he missed at least the first part of training camp on the campus of Hiram College, which annoyed Cleveland Browns owner Art Modell, who threatened to fine Brown $1,500 (equivalent to $14,900 in 2025) for every week of camp he missed. Brown, who had previously said that 1966 would be his last season, the final year of a three-year contract, announced his retirement, instead.

=== Leading man ===
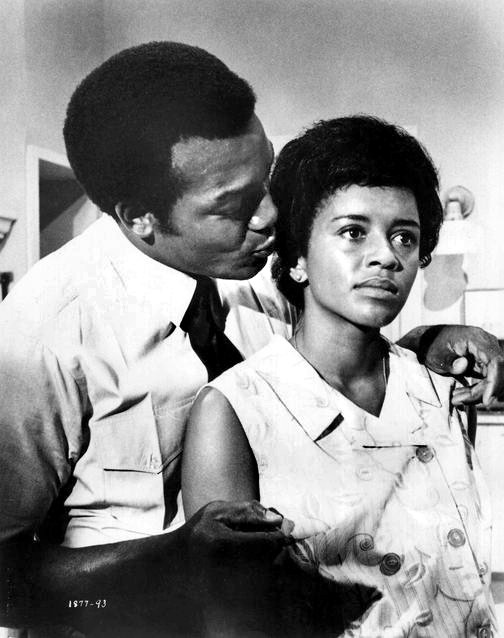
Brown and Janet MacLachlan in Tick, Tick, Tick (1970)

MGM cast Brown in his first lead role in The Split (1968), based on a Parker novel by Donald E. Westlake. He was paid $125,000 for the role. Brown followed it with Riot (1969), a prison film for MGM. Both it and The Split were solid hits at the box office. Biographer Mike Freeman credits Brown with becoming "the first black action star", due to roles such as the Marine captain he portrayed in the hit 1968 film Ice Station Zebra.

Brown went to 20th Century Fox for 100 Rifles (1969). Brown was billed over co-stars Raquel Welch and Burt Reynolds and had a love scene with Welch, one of the first interracial love scenes and the first in a major Hollywood movie. Raquel Welch reflected on the scene in Spike Lee's Jim Brown: All-American. For this role, Brown was paid $200,000 and received five percent of the film's box office, becoming one of the highest-paid black actors.

He tried a straight dramatic part in The Grasshopper (1970).

=== Co-starring ===
Brown starred with fellow NFL star Fred Williamson and Jim Kelly in Three the Hard Way which was released in 1974. He would later star with Williamson, Kelly again with Lee Van Cleef in Take a Hard Ride, a western which was released the following year. The Williamson, Brown and Kelly trio would again appear together with Richard Roundtree in One Down, Two to Go, a 1982 actioner.

=== Later acting career ===
His 1980s appearances were mostly on television. Brown appeared in some TV shows including Knight Rider in the season-three premiere episode "Knight of the Drones". Brown appeared alongside fellow former football player Joe Namath on The A-Team episode "Quarterback Sneak". Brown also appeared on CHiPs, episodes one and two, in season three, as a pickpocket on roller skates.

He appeared opposite Arnold Schwarzenegger in 1987's The Running Man, an adaptation of a Stephen King novel, as Fireball, and had a cameo in the spoof I'm Gonna Git You Sucka (1988).

Brown appeared in Original Gangstas (1996) and Mars Attacks! (1996) and Sucker Free City (2004) and played a defensive coach, Montezuma Monroe, in Any Given Sunday (1999).

== Civil rights work ==
Brown was one of the few athletes to speak out on racial issues in the 1950s as the civil rights movement was growing. He was one of the most prominent African American athletes to engage in civil rights activism, and he called on other African American athletes to become involved in similar initiatives off the field. In 1967, Brown, alongside Bill Russell, Kareem Abdul-Jabbar, and Carl Stokes, were all members of the Cleveland Summit, a meeting with Muhammad Ali held with the intention of convincing the four to rally behind and recruit others to help Ali's cause of civil rights in the United States. Because Ali was a "pariah" in American society at the time because of his opposition to the Vietnam War and refusal to enter the draft, his boxing license had been revoked, and he faced up to five years in prison. For Brown and the other participants to stand with Ali in support of him and his position consequently put "their reputations and their careers" at risk. The Cleveland Summit was later called "a significant turning point for the role of the athlete in society" and "one of the most important civil rights acts in sports history", as well as a predecessor of the 21st century protest movement initiated by Colin Kaepernick.

In 1966, Brown founded the Negro Industrial Economic Union, later known as the Black Economic Union (BEU), to help promote economic opportunities for minority owned businesses. Brown later stated in a 1968 Ebony interview, "We've got to stop wasting all our energy and money marching and picketing and going things like camping-down in Washington on a Poor People's Campaign...We've got to get off the emotional stuff and do something that will bring about real change. We've got to have industries and commercial enterprises and build our own sustaining economic base. Then we can face white folks man-to-man and we can deal." The BEU secured loans and grants, including from the Ford Foundation, to support community initiatives related to food, medicines and farm and economic ventures in specific counties, starting with Marshall County, Mississippi. Because of Brown's economic advocacy for the African American community, Richard Nixon expressed support for black capitalism in his campaign in the 1968 United States presidential election and received an endorsement from Brown. In 1988, Brown founded the Amer-I-Can Foundation, an organization that sought to divert gang members and prisoners from violence by teaching them life skills. Through the foundation, Brown helped establish the Watts truce between rival street gangs in Los Angeles.

Perceiving Brown and other outspoken African-American athletes as a threat, the Federal Bureau of Investigation monitored Brown and his organizations. Files declassified in 2003 showed that the FBI, the United States Secret Service, and several police departments had monitored Brown and the Black Economic Union, attempting to smear the group as a source of Communist and radical Muslim extremism and collecting information to damage Brown's reputation.

== Other post-football activities ==
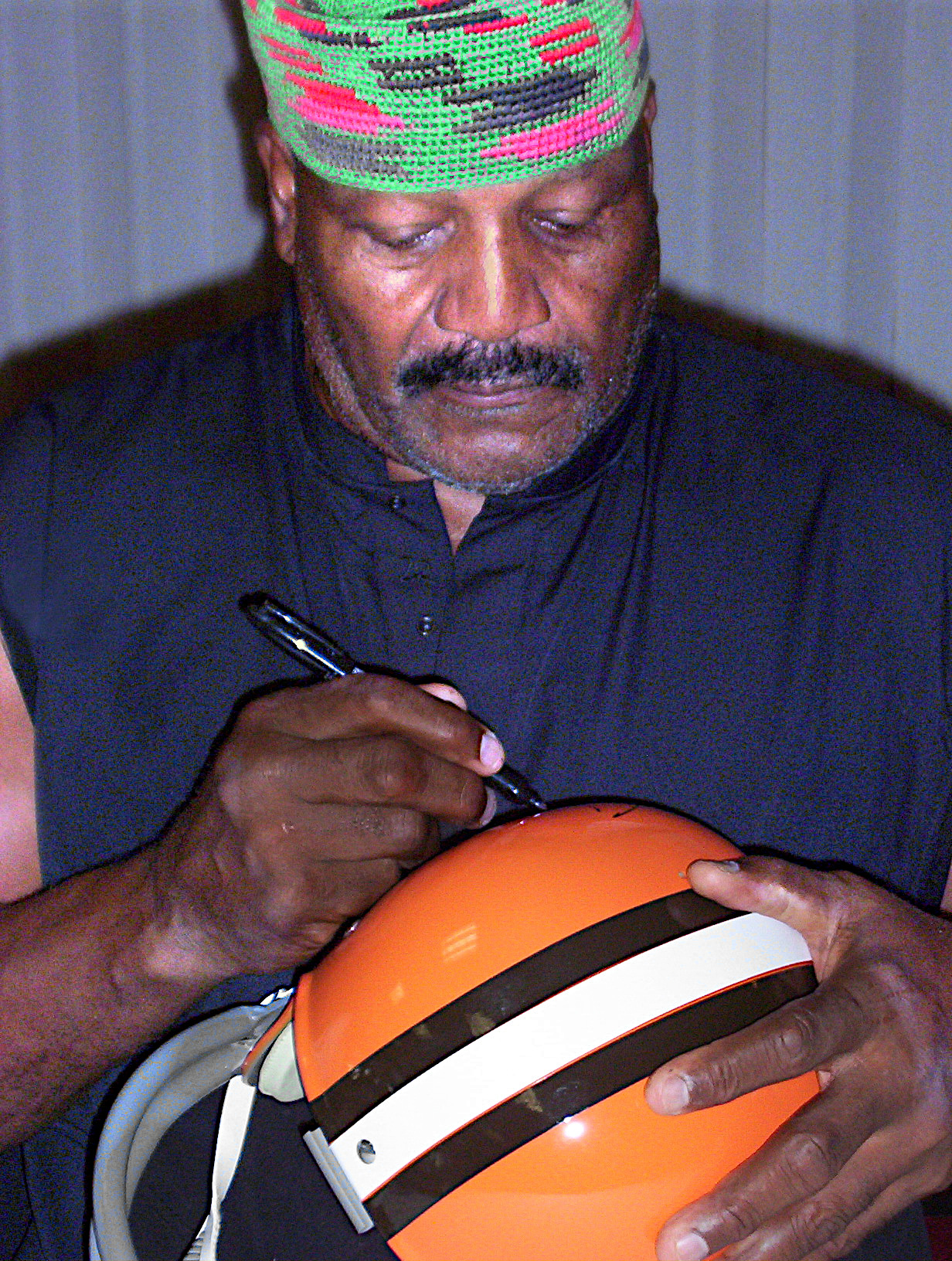
Brown at an autograph signing in 2004

Brown posed in the nude for the September 1974 issue of Playgirl magazine, and was one of the rare celebrities to allow full-frontal nude pictures to be used. Brown also worked as a color analyst on NFL telecasts for CBS in 1978, teaming with Vin Scully and George Allen.

In 1983, 17 years after retiring from professional football, Brown mused about coming out of retirement to play for the Los Angeles Raiders when it appeared that Pittsburgh Steelers running back Franco Harris would break Brown's all-time rushing record. Brown disliked Harris' style of running, criticizing the Steelers' running back's tendency to run out of bounds, a marked contrast to Brown's approach of fighting for every yard and taking on the approaching tackler. Eventually, Walter Payton of the Chicago Bears broke the record on October 7, 1984, with Brown having ended thoughts of a comeback. Harris, who retired after the 1984 season after playing eight games with the Seattle Seahawks, fell short of Brown's mark. Following Harris's last season, in that January, a challenge between Brown and Harris in a 40-yard dash was nationally televised. Brown, at 48 years old, was certain he could beat Harris, though Harris was only 34 years old and just ending his elite career. Harris clocked in at 5.16 seconds, and Brown in at 5.72 seconds, pulling up in towards the end of the race clutching his hamstring.

In 1965, Brown was the first black televised boxing announcer when he announced a televised boxing match in the United States, for the Terrell–Chuvalo fight, and is also credited with then first suggesting a career in boxing promotion to Bob Arum.

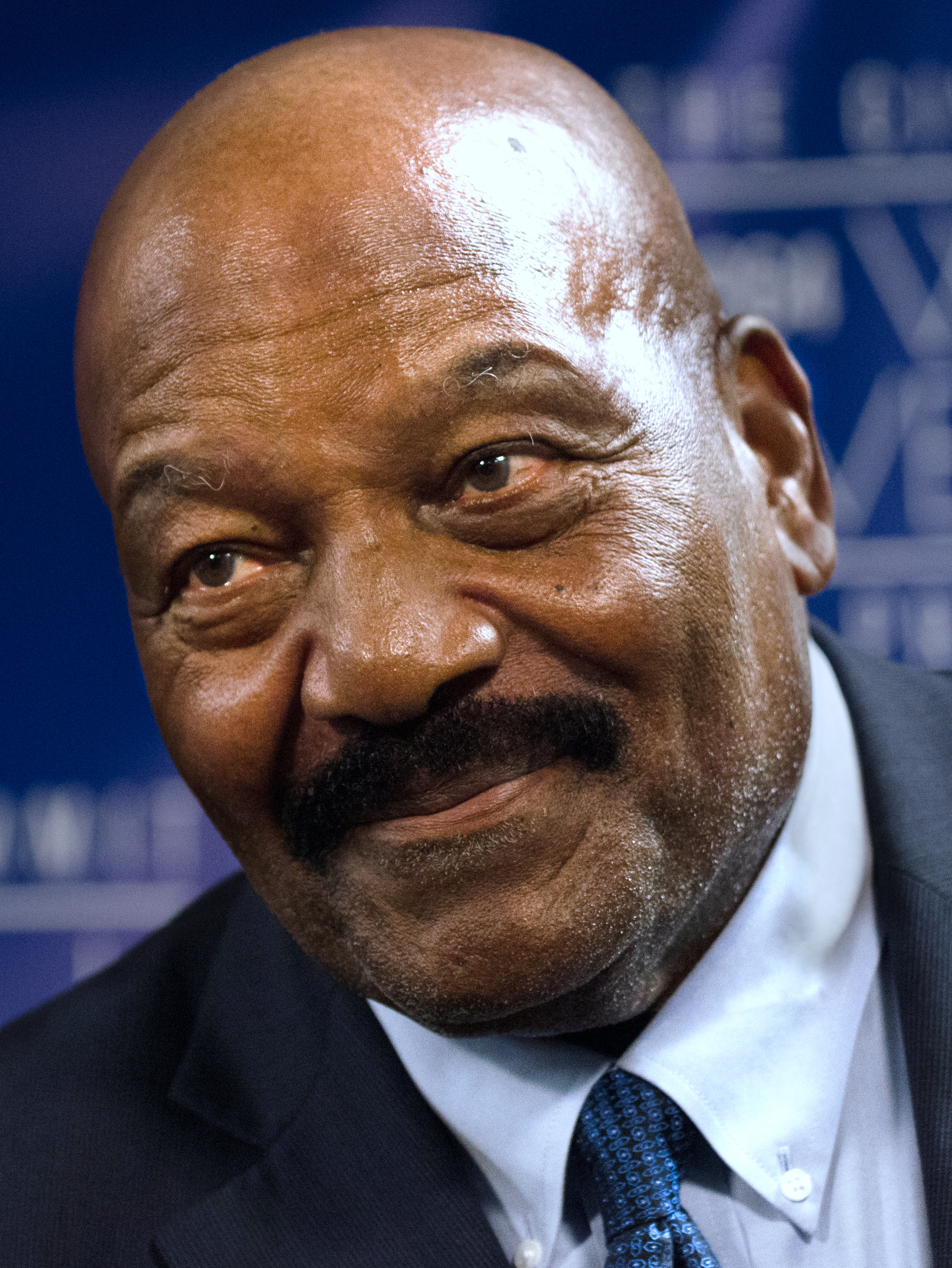
Brown at the Lyndon Baines Johnson Library and Museum in 2014

Brown's autobiography, published in 1989 by Zebra Books, was titled Out of Bounds and was co-written with Steve Delsohn. He was a subject of the 1971 book Jim: The Author's Self-Centered Memoir of the Great Jim Brown written by James Toback.

In 1993, Brown was hired as a color commentator for the Ultimate Fighting Championship, a role he occupied for the first six pay-per-view events. In 2008, Brown initiated a lawsuit against Sony and EA Sports for using his likeness in the Madden NFL video game series. He claimed that he "never signed away any rights that would allow his likeness to be used". From 2008 until his death, Brown served as an executive advisor to the Browns. In that capacity he helped to build relationships with the team's players and to further enhance the NFL's wide range of sponsored programs through the team's player programs department. On May 29, 2013, Brown was named a special advisor to the Browns. Brown became a part-owner of the New York Lizards of Major League Lacrosse, joining a group of investors in the purchase of the team in 2012.

On October 11, 2018, Brown along with Kanye West met with President Donald Trump to discuss the state of America, among other topics. Criticized by the black community for the meeting, Brown said that Trump was the sitting president and "we can't ignore that seat and just call names of the person that's sitting in it". Brown called him "accessible", and said that the president was not a racist.

== Assault allegations ==
Brown was arrested at least seven times for assault, mainly against women. During the era when the incidents occurred, prominent men were usually not scrutinized for reported offenses against women. He was never found guilty of a major crime; in most of the cases, the women refused to press charges after calling the police. In June 1965, Brown was arrested for assault and battery against 18-year-old Brenda Ayres in a Cleveland motel room; he was later acquitted of those charges. A year later, he fought paternity allegations that he fathered her child.

In 1968, Brown was charged with assault with intent to commit murder after model Eva Bohn-Chin was found beneath the balcony of Brown's second-floor apartment. The charges were later dismissed after Bohn-Chin refused to cooperate with the prosecutor's office. Brown was also ordered to pay a $300 fine for striking a deputy sheriff involved in the investigation during the incident. In Brown's autobiography, he stated that Bohn-Chin was angry and jealous over an affair he had been having with Gloria Steinem, and this argument is what led to the "misunderstanding with the police".

In 1970, Brown was found not guilty of assault and battery, the charges stemming from a road-rage incident that had occurred in 1969. In 1975, Brown was convicted of misdemeanor battery for beating and choking his golfing partner, Frank Snow. He was sentenced to one day in jail, two years' probation, and a fine of $500. In 1985, Brown was charged with raping a 33-year-old woman. The charges were later dismissed. In 1986, he was arrested for assaulting his fiancée Debra Clark. Clark refused to press charges, and he was released.

According to several victims and witnesses, who were interviewed for the 2022 documentary series Secrets of Playboy, Brown brutally raped and assaulted numerous women at the Playboy Mansion. These alleged incidents occurred from the late 1970s into the 1990s. According to the documentary, as well as other sources and numerous interviews, other perpetrators of rape and assault at the Playboy Mansion included Roman Polanski and Bill Cosby.

In 1999, Brown was arrested and charged with making terroristic threats toward his wife Monique. According to Brown, "The only time [we] ever have an argument is during [her menstrual period]". Later that year, he was found guilty of vandalism for smashing her car with a shovel. He was sentenced to three years' probation, one year of domestic violence counseling, and 400 hours of community service or 40 hours on a work crew along with a $1,800 fine. Brown ignored the terms of his sentence and in 2000 was sentenced to six months in jail, which he began serving in 2002 after refusing the court-ordered counseling and community service. He was released after three months.

"There is no excuse for violence," said Brown in 2015. "There is never a justification for anyone to impose themselves on someone else. And it will always be incorrect when it comes to a man and a woman, regardless of what might have happened. You need to be man enough to take the blow. That is always the best way. Do not put your hands on a woman."

== Personal life ==
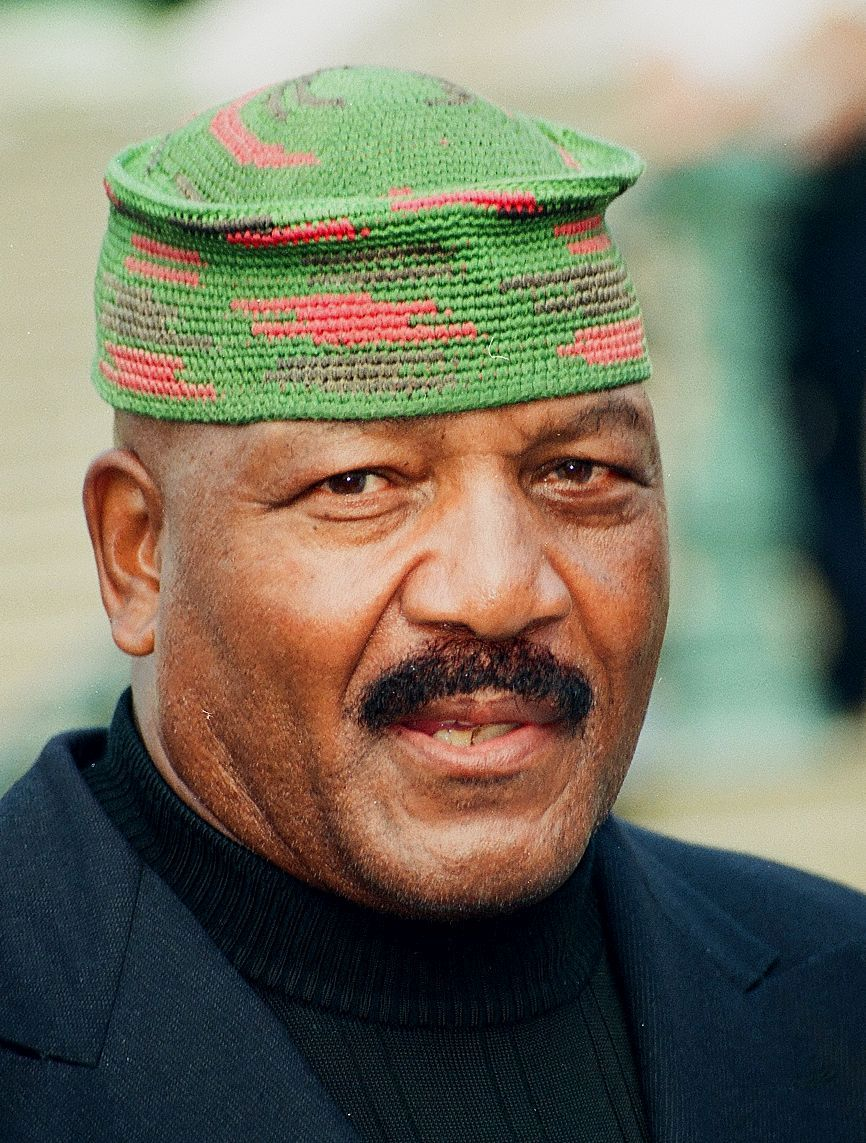
Brown in 2000

Brown married his first wife Sue Brown (née Jones) in September 1959. She sued for divorce in 1968, charging him with "gross neglect". Together, they had three children, twins born 1960, and a son born 1962. Their divorce was finalized in 1972. Brown was ordered to pay $2,500 per month in alimony and $100 per week for child support.

In December 1973, Brown proposed to 18-year-old Diane Stanley, a Clark College student he met in Acapulco, Mexico, in April of that year. They broke off their engagement in 1974.

Brown married his second wife, Monique, in 1997; they had two children.

== Death ==
Brown died of natural causes at the age of 87 on May 18, 2023, at his home in Los Angeles. He died with his wife by his side.

Tributes from the sports world and beyond soon poured in, with former NFL running back Barry Sanders posting on Twitter that "You can't underestimate the impact Jim Brown had on the NFL." Emmitt Smith, the NFL's all-time leader in rushing yards, wrote "He is and was a true legend in sports and in the community using his platform to help others." NFL Commissioner Roger Goodell said "Jim Brown was a gifted athlete — one of the most dominant players to ever step on any athletic field — but also a cultural figure who helped promote change." LeBron James, an NBA star, wrote in tribute that "We lost a hero today. Rest in Paradise to the legend Jim Brown. I hope every black athlete takes the time to educate themselves about this incredible man and what he did to change all of our lives. We all stand on your shoulders Jim Brown." Barack Obama, the 44th president and the first black president of the United States, wrote, "I was too young to remember Jim Brown's playing days, but I knew his legacy. One of the greatest football players ever, he was also an actor and activist – speaking out on civil rights, and pushing other black athletes to do the same."

== In other media ==
Darrin Dewitt Henson played Brown in the 2008 sports drama The Express: The Ernie Davis Story. Brown was portrayed by David Ajala in the London cast of the 2013 play One Night in Miami and by Aldis Hodge in the subsequent 2021 film adaptation of the same name. According to Hodge, he heard "through the grapevine" that Brown - the only subject of the film alive at the film's release - liked the film and approved of Hodge's portrayal of him.

== Sporting legacy ==
Brown's memorable professional career led to his induction into the Pro Football Hall of Fame in 1971. His football accomplishments at Syracuse earned him admission to the College Football Hall of Fame in 1995, and college lacrosse dominance his induction into the National Lacrosse Hall of Fame in 1983.

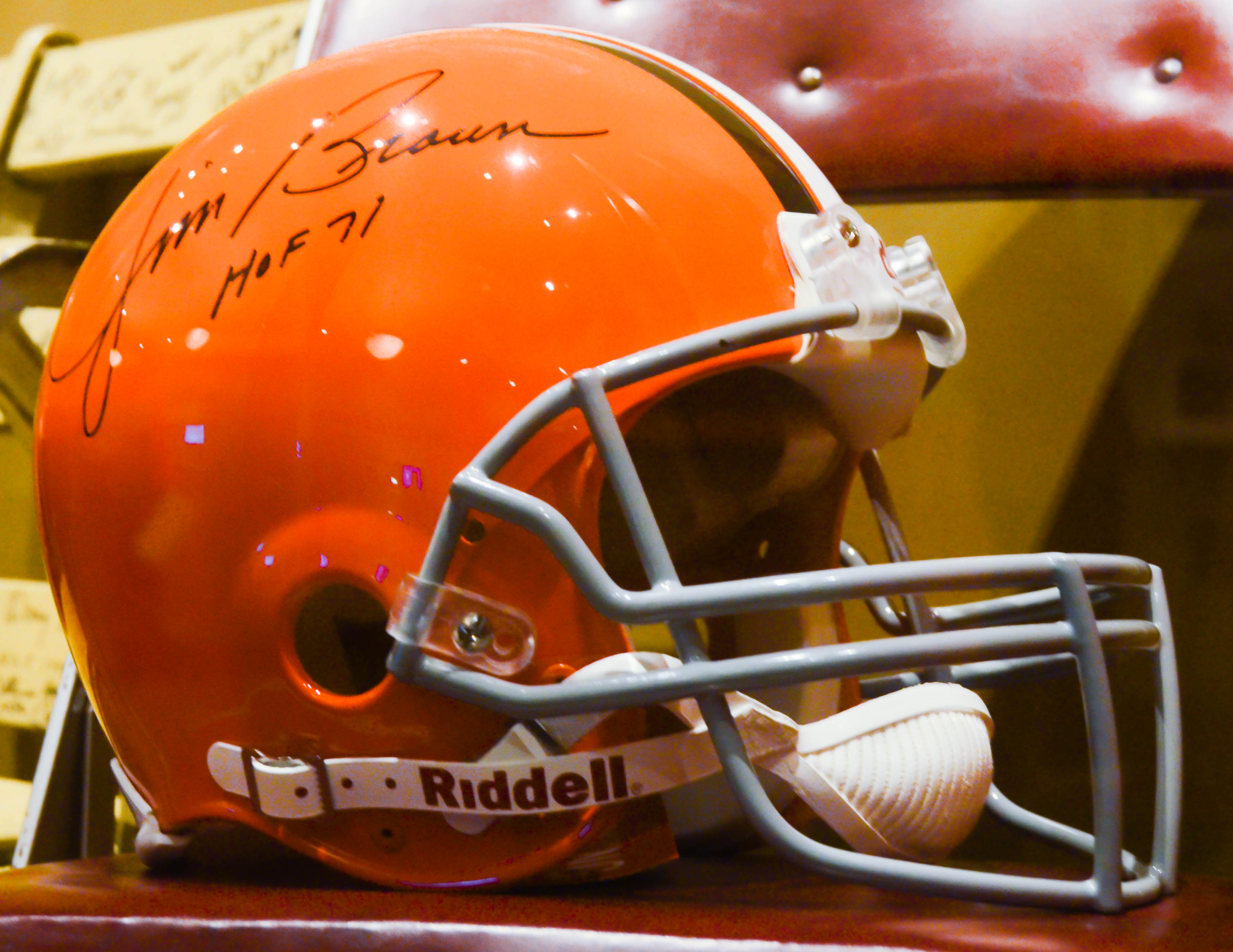
Helmet signed by Brown

Brown remains the only player to win the NFL Rookie of the Year and MVP awards in the same year. In addition to winning the NFL MVP in 1957, 1958, and 1965, Brown was named league MVP by the Newspaper Enterprise Association, United Press International, Maxwell Football Club, and DC Touchdown Club in 1963. Brown is the only NFL player to average 100 rushing yards per game for their career. In 118 career games, he averaged 104.3 yards per game and 5.2 yards per carry; only Barry Sanders (99.8 yards per game and 5.0 yards per carry) comes close to these totals. In comparison, Hall of Famer Walter Payton averaged 88 yards per game during his career with a 4.4 yards-per-carry average. Emmitt Smith averaged 81.2 yards per game with a 4.2 yards-per-carry average. Brown has held the yards-per-game and yards-per-carry (minimum 1,500 carries) records by a running back since his retirement in 1965.

ESPN's SportsCentury in 1999 ranked Brown fourth among their 50 Greatest Athletes of the 20th Century, trailing only Muhammad Ali, Babe Ruth, and Michael Jordan. That same year, The Sporting News selected him as the greatest football player of all time, as did the New York Daily News in 2014. On November 4, 2010, Brown was chosen by NFL Network's NFL Films production The Top 100: NFL's Greatest Players as the second-greatest player in NFL history, behind only Jerry Rice. In November 2019, he was one of two running backs, along with Walter Payton, to be unanimously selected to the NFL 100th Anniversary All-Time Team.

On January 13, 2020, Brown was named the greatest college football player of all time by ESPN, during a ceremony at the College Football Playoff National Championship Game celebrating the 150th anniversary of college football.

== NFL career statistics ==
Legend
	AP NFL MVP
	Won the NFL championship
	NFL record
	Led the league
**Bold**	Career high

=== Regular season ===
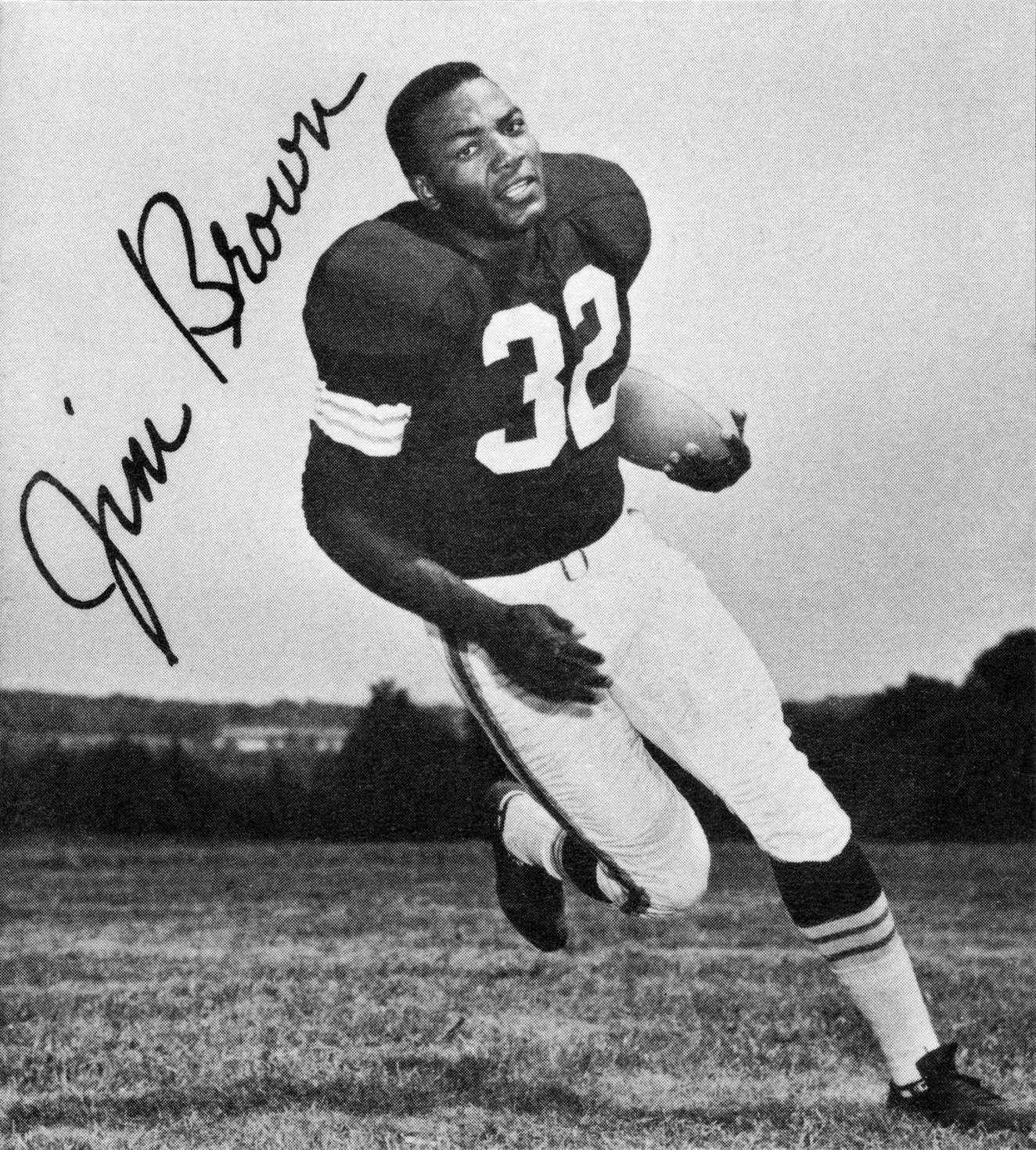
Brown in 1961

Year	Team	Games		Rushing							Receiving					Fum
Year	Team	GP	GS	Att	Yds	Y/A	Y/G	A/G	Lng	TD	Rec	Yds	Y/R	Lng	TD	Fum
1957	CLE	12	12	202	942	4.7	78.5	16.8	69	9	16	55	3.4	12	1	7
1958	CLE	12	12	257	1,527	5.9	127.3	21.4	65	**17**	16	138	8.6	46	1	5
1959	CLE	12	12	290	1,329	4.6	110.8	**24.2**	70	14	24	190	7.9	25	0	2
1960	CLE	12	12	215	1,257	5.8	104.8	17.9	71	9	19	204	10.7	37	2	**9**
1961	CLE	14	14	**305**	1,408	4.6	100.6	21.8	38	8	46	459	10.0	77	2	6
1962	CLE	14	14	230	996*	4.3	71.1	16.4	31	13	**47**	**517**	11.0	53	**5**	**9**
1963	CLE	14	14	291	**1,863**	**6.4**	**133.1**	20.8	**80**	12	24	268	**11.2**	**83**	3	7
1964	CLE	14	14	280	1,446	5.2	103.3	20.0	71	7	36	340	9.4	40	2	6
1965	CLE	14	14	289	1,544	5.3	110.3	20.6	67	**17**	34	328	9.6	32	4	6
Career		118	118	2,359	12,312	5.2	104.3	20.0	80	106	262	2,499	9.5	83	20	57

* Based on evidence presented from play-by-play reports of five disputed games from that season, the argument is made that Brown did in fact break the 1,000-yard barrier in 1962.

=== Postseason ===
Year	Team	Games		Rushing							Receiving					Fum
Year	Team	GP	GS	Att	Yds	Y/A	Y/G	A/G	Lng	TD	Rec	Yds	Y/R	Lng	TD	Fum
1957	CLE	1	1	20	69	3.5	69.0	20.0	29	**1**	0	0	—	0	0	0
1958	CLE	1	1	7	8	1.1	8.0	7.0	20	0	2	18	9.0	12	0	0
1964	CLE	1	1	**27**	**114**	**4.2**	**114.0**	**27.0**	**46**	0	**3**	37	12.3	23	0	0
1965	CLE	1	1	12	50	**4.2**	50.0	12.0	15	0	**3**	**44**	**14.7**	**30**	0	0
Career		4	4	66	241	3.7	60.3	16.5	46	1	8	99	12.4	30	0	0

== Career highlights ==
=== Awards and honors ===
==== NFL ====
- NFL champion (1964)
- 3× NFL Most Valuable Player (1957, 1958, 1965)
- 3× Sporting News NFL MVP (1957, 1958, 1965)
- 3× Jim Thorpe Trophy (1958, 1963, 1965)
- 3× UPI NFL MVP (1958, 1963, 1965)
- 2× Joe F. Carr Trophy (1958, 1965)
- 2× DC Touchdown Club NFL MVP (1958, 1963)
- Bert Bell Award (1963)
- AP NFL Rookie of the Year (1957)
- The Sporting News NFL Rookie of the Year (1957)
- UPI NFL Rookie of the Year (1957)
- 8× First-team All-Pro (1957–1961, 1963–1965)
- Second-team All-Pro (1962)
- 9× Sporting News first-team All-Pro (1957–1965)
- 8× NEA first-team All-Pro (1957–1961, 1963–1965)
- 8× UPI first-team All-Pro (1957–1961, 1963–1965)
- UPI second-team All-Pro (1962)
- 8× New York Daily News first-team All-Pro (1957–1961, 1963–1965)
- 9× Pro Bowl (1957–1965)
- 3× Pro Bowl Game Co-MVP (1962, 1963, 1966)
- 8× NFL rushing yards leader (1957–1961, 1963–1965)
- 6× NFL yards from scrimmage leader (1958, 1959, 1961, 1963–1965)
- 6× NFL rushing attempts leader (1958, 1959, 1961, 1963–1965)
- 5× NFL rushing touchdowns leader (1957–1959, 1963, 1965)
- 5× NFL all-purpose yards leader (1958–1961, 1964)
- 5× NFL approximate value leader (1960, 1961, 1963–1965) (Note: Leaders have been tracked since the 1960 season; The only two players to have a higher value than Brown in 1961, were George Blanda and Charlie Hennigan of the AFL.)
- 3× NFL total touchdowns leader (1958, 1959, 1963)
- 2× NFL yards per rushing attempt leader (1963, 1964)
- NFL scoring leader (1958)
- NFL 1960s All-Decade Team
- NFL 50th Anniversary All-Time Team
- NFL 75th Anniversary All-Time Team
- NFL 100th Anniversary All-Time Team (first member & unanimous selection)
- AFL-NFL 1960–1984 All-Star Team (Note: Chosen by the Hall of Fame Selection Committee in 1985.)
- NFL All-Time Team (Note: Chosen by members of the Hall of Fame Selection Committee in 2000 for the book NFL's Greatest.)
- No. 2 on The Top 100: NFL's Greatest Players
- Cleveland Browns Ring of Honor
- Cleveland Browns Legends
- Cleveland Browns No. 32 retired
- Statue in front of Huntington Bank Field (2016)
- To honor him, the Cleveland Browns named their Inspire Change Changemaker Award after him (2022)
- To permanently honor the impact of Jim Brown in the NFL, the player with the most rushing yards each season will be presented with the Jim Brown Award (2022)
- In partnership with the Pro Football Hall of Fame, the Cleveland Browns held a "Celebration of Life" tribute in his memory, following his death (2023)

Lacrosse

- To honor Brown's ever-lasting influence on lacrosse, the Premier Lacrosse League named its Most Valuable Player award after him (2019)
- Brown joined the Premier Lacrosse League as both an advisor and a champion of the PLL Assists program (2019)

==== College ====
NCAA

- Silver Anniversary Award (1982)

Syracuse

- 10× letterman in four sports (football, basketball, lacrosse, and track)
- Syracuse Athlete of the Year (1956–1957)
- Syracuse Orange Ring of Honor (2020)
- Arents Award for excellence in athletics and social activism (2016)
- Statue at Plaza 44 outside the Ensley Athletic Center

Football

- Lambert-Meadowlands Trophy (1956)
- Cotton Bowl Co-MVP (1957)
- College All-Star Game Team (1957)
- Unanimous All-American (1956)
  - AP first-team All-American (1956)
  - AFCA All-American (1956)
  - FWAA All-American (1956)
  - NEA first-team All-American (1956)
  - UPI first-team All-American (1956)
  - INS first-team All-American (1956)
  - Collier's first-team All-American (1956)
  - CPA first-team All-American (1956)
  - WC All-American (1956)
- INS second-team All-American (1955)
- AP third-team All-American (1955)
- NEA third-team All-American (1955)
- 2× Unanimous first-team All-Eastern (1955, 1956)
  - 2× AP first-team All-Eastern (1955, 1956)
  - 2× UPI first-team All-Eastern (1955, 1956)
  - 2× INS First-team All-Eastern (1955, 1956)
- NCAA rushing touchdowns co-leader (1956)
- NCAA average kickoff return yards leader (1955)
- Walter Camp All-Time All-American
- Walter Camp All-Century Team
- Syracuse All-Century Team
- Syracuse Orange No. 44 retired
- To honor Jim Brown, the Touchdown Club of Columbus awards the NCAA's top running back with the Jim Brown Trophy (1991)

Lacrosse

- Coaches Poll National Champion (1957) (undefeated perfect 10–0 season)
- First-team All-American (1957)
- Second-team All-American (1956)
- North–South All-Star Game Champion (1957)
- NCAA goalscoring co-leader with 43 goals (1957)

Track and field

- Fifth place at the USA Outdoor Track and Field Championships – Decathlon (1955)
  - First place – Discus throw (143 ft 4.5 in (43.701 m))
- Dual Meet Champion vs Colgate (May 18, 1957)
  - High jump champion
  - Discus throw champion

==== High school ====
Manhasset High School

- 13× letterman in five sports (football, basketball, baseball, lacrosse, and track)
- Hometown Hall of Famers Plaque (2013)

Track and field

- Nassau County high jump champion (1952)
- Dual-meet champion vs Sea Cliff High School (May 21, 1952)
  - High jump champion
  - Discus throw champion
- Dual-Meet Event vs East Rockaway High School (June 4, 1951)
  - Discus throw champion
- Dual-meet event vs Hicksville High School (May 23, 1951)
  - 880 yard relay champion
- Tri-Meet Event vs Great Neck High School and Roslyn High School (May 9, 1951)
  - High jump champion

Lacrosse

- 4× Woodstick Classic Champion (1950–1953)
- Long Island-Metropolitan Lacrosse Conference
  - Syracuse University Trophy (MVP) (1952)
  - 3× First-team All-Conference All-Star (1951–1953)

Baseball

- Threw two no-hitters

Football

- Double A Conference Co-Champion (1952) (undefeated)
- Tom Thorp Memorial Award (MVP) (1952)
- 2× Nassau first-team All-Scholastic (1951, 1952)
- 2× Nassau County football scoring leader (1951, 1952)

Basketball

- 2× First-team All-Nassau (1952, 1953)
- All-Nassau Team Honorable Mention (1951)
- 2× Nassau County scoring leader (1952, 1953)
- Newsday's Long Island 1950s All-Decade Team
- Nassau County single season record 38.1 ppg scoring average (1953)
- Only player in Nassau County history to score 50+ points in consecutive games (1952)

==== Halls of fame ====
- Pro Football Hall of Fame – Class of 1971
- College Football Hall of Fame – Class of 1995
- National Lacrosse Hall of Fame – Class of 1983
- Helms Athletic Foundation Pro Football Hall of Fame – Class of 1967
- NYSPHSAA Hall of Fame – Class of 2016
- Cotton Bowl Hall of Fame – Class of 1998
- U.S. Army ROTC Hall of Fame – Class of 2016
- National High School Football Hall of Fame – Inaugural Class of 2023
- Nassau County High School Athletics Hall of Fame – Inaugural Class of 2015
- Long Island Metropolitan Lacrosse Hall of Fame – Class of 1987
- Long Island Sports Hall of Fame – Inaugural Class of 1984
- Manhasset Lacrosse Hall of Fame – Inaugural Class of 1989
- Ohio Sports Hall of Fame – Inaugural Class of 2024
- United States Athletics Hall of Fame – Inaugural Class of 2023

==== Media ====
- Philadelphia Sports Writers Association Athlete of the Year (1958)
- 2× ESPN American Athlete of the Year (1958, 1959)
- Hickok Belt (1964)
- National Football Foundation Distinguished American Award (1982)
- NAACP Image Awards – Jackie Robinson Sports Award (1997)
- TDC Lifetime Achievement Award (1997)
- NFL Alumni Order of the Leather Helmet (1998)
- Ranked #4 on ESPN SportsCentury: Top 50 North American Athletes of the 20th Century (1999)
- Associated Press' Greatest Football Player of the 20th Century (1999)
- Sporting News' Greatest Football Player of All Time (1999)
- Greater Cleveland Sports Commission – Lifetime Achievement Award (2002) (inaugural recipient)
- Sports Illustrated's Greatest College Athlete of All Time (2006)
- MaxPreps' Greatest New York Male High School Athlete (2009)
- Ranked #2 on NFL Network The Top 100: NFL's Greatest Players of All Time (2010)
- Tewaaraton Legend Award (2011) (inaugural recipient)
- PwC Doak Walker Legends Award (2012)
- Martin Luther King Jr. Sports Legacy Award (2013)
- MLB Beacon of Hope Award (2014)
- Harold & Carole Pump Foundation – Lifetime Achievement Award (2014)
- Muhammad Ali Lifetime Humanitarian Achievement Award (2014)
- New York Daily News' Greatest Football Player of All Time (2014)
- Sports Illustrated's Muhammad Ali Legacy Award (2016)
- Harlem Lacrosse – Trailblazer Award (2017) (inaugural recipient)
- Bleacher Report's Greatest Athlete of All Time (2018)
- Bleacher Report's NFL All-Time Team (2018)
- ESPN First Team All-Time All-American (2019)
- MaxPreps' Greatest All-Around High School Athlete of All Time (2019)
- Named The Greatest College Football Player of All Time by ESPN (2020)
- ESPN's Greatest Running Back of All Time (2023)
- CBS Sports' Greatest Running Back of All Time (2026)

==== Acting career ====
- NAACP Image Award for Outstanding Actor in a Motion Picture – El Condor (1970)

Nominations

- Laurel Awards
  - Male New Face (1968)
  - Male Supporting Performance – The Dirty Dozen (1968)
- MTV Movie & TV Awards
  - Best Fight: Jim Brown vs. Alien – Mars Attacks! (1997)

=== Records ===
For details regarding NFL and Cleveland Browns team records at the time of his retirement, please refer to the ‘Career Highlights’ tab on his page at the Pro Football Hall of Fame website, available here

==== NFL records ====
- First player in history with 300 rush attempts in a season: 305 (1961)
- First player in history to rush for 1,500 yards in a season: 1,527 (1958)
- First player in history with 2,000 yards from scrimmage in a season: 2,131 (1963)
- First player in history to reach 100 career rushing touchdowns (1965)
- First player in history to reach 10,000 career rushing yards (1964)
- Fewest games to reach 12,000 career rushing yards: 115
- Career rushing yards per game: 104.3
- Career yards per rushing attempt by a running back (minimum 1,500 carries): 5.22
- Yards per rushing attempt in a season (minimum 200 attempts): 6.4 (1963)
- Most seasons leading the NFL in rushing touchdowns: 5 (1957–1959, 1963, 1965)
- Most seasons leading the NFL in rushing yards: 8 (1957–1961, 1963–1965)
- Most consecutive seasons leading the NFL in rushing yards: 5 (1957–1961)
- Most seasons leading the NFL in all-purpose yards: 5 (1958–1961, 1964)
- Most consecutive seasons leading the NFL in all-purpose yards: 4 (1958–1961)
- Most seasons leading the NFL in yards from scrimmage: 6 (1958, 1959, 1961, 1963–1965)
- Most seasons leading the NFL in rushing attempts: 6 (1958, 1959, 1961, 1963–1965)
- Career average approximate value per season: 20.33 (Note: Stat has only been tracked for the last six seasons of his career.)
- Most seasons leading the NFL in approximate value: 5 (1960, 1961, 1963–1965)
- Most consecutive seasons leading the NFL in approximate value: 3 (1963–1965) (tied with Alan Page and Steve Young)
- Most seasons averaging 100+ yards per game: 7 (1958–1961, 1963–1965)
- Most consecutive seasons averaging 100 yards per game: 4 (1958–1961)
- Most games with 4+ touchdowns: 6
- Most rushing touchdowns in a single half: 4 (November 18, 1962) (tied with Roland Hooks, Chuck Muncie, Eric Dickerson, Shaun Alexander, Priest Holmes, and Doug Martin)

==== Browns franchise records ====
- Points scored in a season: 126 (1965)
- Career total touchdowns: 126
- Most seasons leading the team in total touchdowns: 7 (1957–1959, 1961, 1963–1965) (Note: Co-led the team with Bobby Mitchell in 1961.)
- Total touchdowns in a season: 21 (1965)
- Career rushing touchdowns: 106
- Most seasons leading the team in rushing touchdowns: 9 (1957–1965)
- Most consecutive seasons leading the team in rushing touchdowns: 9 (1957–1965)
- Rushing touchdowns in a season: 17 (1958, 1965)
- Rushing touchdowns in a game: 5 (November 1, 1959)
- Career rushing yards: 12,312
- Most seasons leading the team in rushing yards: 9 (1957–1965)
- Most consecutive seasons leading the team in rushing yards: 9 (1957–1965)
- Rushing yards in a season: 1,863 (1963)
- Career all-purpose yards: 15,459
- Most seasons leading the team in all-purpose yards: 9 (1957–1965)
- Most consecutive seasons leading the team in all-purpose yards: 9 (1957–1965)
- Career yards from scrimmage: 14,811
- Most seasons leading the team in yards from scrimmage: 9 (1957–1965)
- Most consecutive seasons leading the team in yards from scrimmage: 9 (1957–1965)
- Yards from scrimmage in a season: 2,131 (1963)
- Career rush attempts: 2,359
- Career rushing yards per attempt: 5.22
- Most seasons leading the team in yards per rush attempt: 7 (1957, 1958, 1960, 1962–1965)
- Yards per rush attempt in a season: 6.4 (1963)
- Most seasons with at least 1,000 all-purpose yards: 9 (1957–1965)
- Most consecutive seasons with at least 1,000 all-purpose yards: 9 (1957–1965)
- Most seasons with at least 1,000 yards from scrimmage: 9 (1957–1965)
- Most consecutive seasons with at least 1,000 yards from scrimmage: 9 (1957–1965)
- Most seasons with at least 12 rushing touchdowns: 5 (1958, 1959, 1962, 1963, 1965)
- Most seasons with at least 1,000 rushing yards: 7 (Note: Based on evidence presented from play-by-play reports of five disputed games from that season, the argument is made that Brown did in fact break the 1,000-yard barrier in 1962, making it 8 consecutive 1,000 yard rushing seasons from 1958–1965.) (1958–1961, 1963–1965)
- Most seasons with at least 1,500 rushing yards: 3 (1958, 1963, 1965)
- Most consecutive seasons with at least 1,000 rushing yards: 4 (1958–1961) (tied with Nick Chubb)
- Most seasons with at least 200 rush attempts: 9 (1957–1965)
- Most consecutive seasons with at least 200 rush attempts: 9 (1957–1965)
- Career games with at least 100 rushing yards: 58
- Consecutive games scoring a touchdown: 10 (1965)

==== Browns NFL Championship records (Note: Not including AAFC Championship game team stats and records.) ====
- Career rushing yards: 233
- Rushing yards in a championship game: 114 (1964)
- Yards from scrimmage in a championship game: 151 (1964)
- Career rush attempts: 59
- Rush attempts in a championship game: 27 (1964)

== Filmography ==
Year	Title	Role	Notes
1964	Rio Conchos	Sergeant Franklyn	First film
1965	Valentine's Day	Himself	1 episode
1967	I Spy	Tommy	Episode: "Cops and Robbers"
1967	The Dirty Dozen	Robert Jefferson	
1968	Dark of the Sun	Ruffo	Lead
1968	Ice Station Zebra	Captain Leslie Anders	
1968	The Split	McClain	Lead
1969	Riot	Cully Briston	Lead
1969	100 Rifles	Sheriff Lyedecker	Lead
1969	Kenner	Roy Kenner	Lead
1970	...tick...tick...tick...	Jimmy Price	Lead
1970	El Condor	Luke	Lead
1970	The Grasshopper	Tommy Marcott	
1972	Slaughter	Slaughter	Lead
1972	Black Gunn	Gunn	Lead
1973	Slaughter's Big Rip-Off	Slaughter	Lead
1973	The Slams	Curtis Hook	Lead
1974	I Escaped from Devil's Island	Le Bras	Lead
1974	Three the Hard Way	Jimmy Lait	Lead
1975	Take a Hard Ride	Pike	Lead
1977	Police Story	Pete Gerard	Episode: "End of the Line"
1977	Kid Vengeance	Isaac	
1978	Fingers	"Dreems"	
1978	Pacific Inferno	Clyde Preston	Lead
1979–1983	CHiPs	Romo / Parkdale H.S. Shop Teacher John Casey	3 episodes
1982	One Down, Two to Go	"J"	Lead
1983–1984	T. J. Hooker	Detective Jim Cody / Frank Barnett	2 episodes
1984	Knight Rider	C. J. Jackson	Episode: "Knight of the Drones"
1984	Cover Up	Calvin Tyler	Episode: "Midnight Highway"
1985	Lady Blue	Stoker	pilot episode
1986	The A-Team	"Steamroller"	Episode: "Quarterback Sneak"
1987	The Running Man	"Fireball"	
1988	I'm Gonna Git You Sucka	"Slammer"	
1989	L.A. Heat	Captain	
1989	Crack House	Steadman	
1990	Killing American Style	"Sunset"	
1990	Twisted Justice	Morris	
1990	Hammer, Slammer, & Slade	"Slammer"	
1992	The Divine Enforcer	King	
1996	Original Gangstas	Jake Trevor	
1996	Mars Attacks!	Byron Williams	
1998	He Got Game	Spivey	
1998	Small Soldiers	Butch Meathook	Voice
1999	New Jersey Turnpikes	Unknown	
1999	Any Given Sunday	Montezuma Monroe	
2002	On the Edge	Chad Grant	
2004	She Hate Me	Geronimo Armstrong	
2004	Sucker Free City	Don Strickland	
2005	Animal	Berwell	
2006	Sideliners	Monroe	talk show
2010	Dream Street	Unknown	
2014	Draft Day	Himself	Cameo
2016	Unsung Hollywood	Himself	documentary
2019	The Black Godfather	Himself	documentary
2023	Outlaw Johnny Black	Old man	Cameo; posthumous release

== See also ==
- Most consecutive starts by a fullback
- List of National Football League rushing yards leaders
- List of National Football League rushing champions
- List of NCAA major college yearly punt and kickoff return leaders
