= 1957 Washington State Cougars football team =

American college football season

1957 Washington State Cougars football
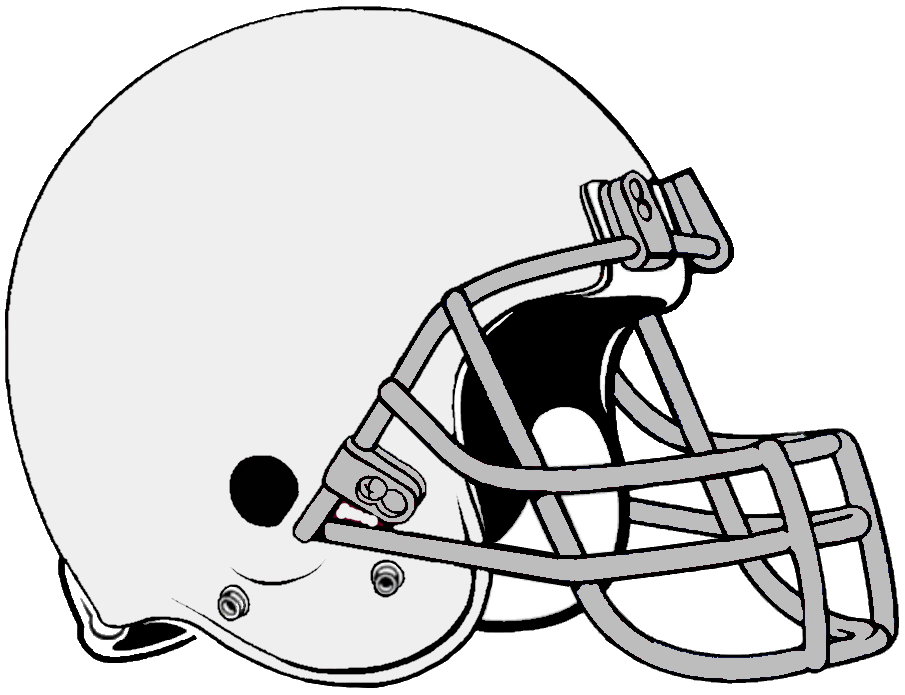
- Conference: Pacific Coast Conference
- Record: 6–4 (5–3 PCC)
- Head coach: Jim Sutherland (2nd season)
- Home stadium: Rogers Field, Memorial Stadium

1957 Pacific Coast Conference football standings
| | Conf. | | | | | Overall |
| Team | W | | L | | T | W | | L | | T |
|---|---|---|---|---|---|---|---|---|---|---|
| Oregon State + | 6 | – | 2 | – | 0 | 8 | – | 2 | – | 0 |
| No. 17 Oregon ^ + | 6 | – | 2 | – | 0 | 7 | – | 4 | – | 0 |
| No. 19 UCLA | 5 | – | 2 | – | 0 | 8 | – | 2 | – | 0 |
| Washington State | 5 | – | 3 | – | 0 | 6 | – | 4 | – | 0 |
| Stanford | 4 | – | 3 | – | 0 | 6 | – | 4 | – | 0 |
| Washington | 3 | – | 4 | – | 0 | 3 | – | 6 | – | 1 |
| California | 1 | – | 6 | – | 0 | 1 | – | 9 | – | 0 |
| USC | 1 | – | 6 | – | 0 | 1 | – | 9 | – | 0 |
| Idaho | 0 | – | 3 | – | 0 | 4 | – | 4 | – | 1 |
+ – Conference co-champions; ^ – Selected as Rose Bowl representative Oregon State won the rivalry game over Oregon, but PCC no-repeat rule was in effect; Rankings from Coaches Poll

The 1957 Washington State Cougars football team was an American football team that represented Washington State College during the 1957 college football season. Led by second-year head coach Jim Sutherland, the team posted a 6–4 overall record, and were 5–3 in the Pacific Coast Conference.

The one-point win over struggling USC was the first time the Cougars had defeated the Trojans in 23 years; in between, the two had tied four times (1936, 1937, 1940, 1950).

Junior end Don Ellingsen led the PCC and ranked second nationally with 45 receptions. He also led the PCC (fourth nationally) with 559 receiving yards.

== Schedule ==
| Date | Opponent | Rank | Site | Result | Attendance | Source |
|---|---|---|---|---|---|---|
| September 21 | at Nebraska* | | Memorial Stadium; Lincoln, NE | W 34–12 | 31,000 | |
| September 28 | California | | Rogers Field; Pullman, WA | W 13–7 | 16,000 | |
| October 5 | at No. 8 Iowa* | | Iowa Stadium; Iowa City, IA | L 13–20 | 47,334 | |
| October 12 | at Stanford | | Stanford Stadium; Stanford, CA | W 21–18 | 25,000 | |
| October 19 | Oregon^{†} | No. 19 | Rogers Field; Pullman, WA | L 13–14 | 19,000 | |
| October 26 | at USC | | Los Angeles Memorial Coliseum; Los Angeles, CA | W 13–12 | 24,902 | |
| November 2 | at Oregon State | | Parker Stadium; Corvallis, OR | L 25–39 | 20,200 | |
| November 9 | UCLA | | Memorial Stadium; Spokane, WA | L 13–19 | 27,000 | |
| November 16 | Idaho | | Rogers Field; Pullman, WA (Battle of the Palouse) | W 21–13 | 13,400 | |
| November 23 | at Washington | | Husky Stadium; Seattle, WA (rivalry) | W 27–7 | 47,500 | |
*Non-conference game; ^{†}Homecoming; Rankings from AP Poll released prior to the game; Source:

== NFL draft ==
Four Cougars were selected in the 1958 NFL draft, which was 30 rounds and 360 selections.

| Player | Position | Round | Overall | Franchise |
|---|---|---|---|---|
| Bob Newman | Back | 2 | 22 | San Francisco 49ers |
| Bill Steiger | End | 22 | 259 | Los Angeles Rams |
| Dan Verhey | Tackle | 23 | 276 | Cleveland Browns |
| Dave Crowell | Guard | 28 | 326 | Green Bay Packers |
