= 1957 UCLA Bruins football team =

American college football season

1957 UCLA Bruins football
- Conference: Pacific Coast Conference

Ranking
- Coaches: No. 19
- Record: 8–2 (5–2 PCC)
- Head coach: Red Sanders (9th season)
- Captains: Joe Harper; Jim Dawson
- Home stadium: Los Angeles Memorial Coliseum

1957 Pacific Coast Conference football standings
	Conf.					Overall
Team	W		L		T	W		L		T
Oregon State +	6	–	2	–	0	8	–	2	–	0
No. 17 Oregon ^ +	6	–	2	–	0	7	–	4	–	0
No. 19 UCLA	5	–	2	–	0	8	–	2	–	0
Washington State	5	–	3	–	0	6	–	4	–	0
Stanford	4	–	3	–	0	6	–	4	–	0
Washington	3	–	4	–	0	3	–	6	–	1
California	1	–	6	–	0	1	–	9	–	0
USC	1	–	6	–	0	1	–	9	–	0
Idaho	0	–	3	–	0	4	–	4	–	1
+ – Conference co-champions; ^ – Selected as Rose Bowl representative Oregon State won the rivalry game over Oregon, but PCC no-repeat rule was in effect; Rankings from Coaches Poll

The 1957 UCLA Bruins football team was an American football team that represented the University of California, Los Angeles in the Pacific Coast Conference (PCC) during the 1957 college football season. In their ninth and final year under head coach Red Sanders, the Bruins compiled an 8–2 record (5–2 in PCC, third).

UCLA's offensive leaders were quarterback Don Long with 479 passing yards, Chuck Kendall with 388 rushing yards, and Dick Wallen with 303 receiving yards.

Shortly before his tenth season in 1958, head coach Sanders died of a heart attack at age 53 in a Los Angeles hotel room on August 14.

== Schedule ==
Date	Opponent	Rank	Site	Result	Attendance	Source
September 20	Air Force*		Los Angeles Memorial Coliseum; Los Angeles, CA	W 47–0	33,293	
September 27	Illinois*		Los Angeles Memorial Coliseum; Los Angeles, CA	W 16–6	48,714	
October 5	at Oregon		Hayward Field; Eugene, OR	L 0–21	16,332	
October 12	Washington		Los Angeles Memorial Coliseum; Los Angeles, CA	W 19–0	24,889	
October 19	No. 7 Oregon State		Los Angeles Memorial Coliseum; Los Angeles, CA	W 26–7	46,102	
October 26	at Stanford	No. 15	Stanford Stadium; Stanford, CA	L 6–20	46,000	
November 2	California		Los Angeles Memorial Coliseum; Los Angeles, CA (rivalry)	W 16–14	44,772	
November 9	at Washington State		Memorial Stadium; Spokane, WA	W 19–13	27,000	
November 16	at Pacific*		Pacific Memorial Stadium; Stockton, CA	W 21–0	23,000	
November 23	at USC		Los Angeles Memorial Coliseum; Los Angeles, CA (Victory Bell)	W 20–9	64,818	
*Non-conference game; Rankings from AP Poll released prior to the game; Source:

== Personnel ==
=== Players ===
- Glen Almquist, end
- Tom Avery, tackle
- Barry Billington, fullback
- Dick Butler, center
- Craig Chudy, end
- Rod Cochran, guard
- John Davis, wingback
- Jim Dawson, tackle
- Bob Dinaberg, tackle
- Dennis Dressel
- Don Duncan, fullback
- Steve Gertsman, blocking back
- Joe Harper, guard
- Chuck Kendall, tailback
- Bill Leeka
- Kurt Lewin, guard
- Don Long, tailback
- Bill Mason, wingback/defensive halfback
- Paul Oglesby, tackle
- Phil Parslow, wingback
- Dan Peterson, center
- Dave Peterson, blocking back/linebacker
- Art Phillips, blocking back
- John Pierovich, end
- Dave Smith, tackle
- Ray Smith, sophomore fullback
- Jim Steffen, defensive end
- Jim Wallace, sophomore tackle
- Dick Wallen, end
- Bob Weeden, sophomore center/tackle
- Clint Whitfield, guard
- Kirk Wilson, punter/tailback

=== Coaches ===
- Head coach - Red Sanders
- Assistant coaches - Deke Brackett, Sam Boghosian, Bill Barnes, Ray Nagel, George W. Dickerson, Johnny Johnson

=== Other personnel ===
- Head trainer - Ducky Drake
- Team physician - Dr. Bob Anderson
