= 1957 USC Trojans football team =

American college football season

1957 USC Trojans football
- Conference: Pacific Coast Conference
- Record: 1–9 (1–6 PCC)
- Head coach: Don Clark (1st season)
- Home stadium: Los Angeles Memorial Coliseum

1957 Pacific Coast Conference football standings
	Conf.					Overall
Team	W		L		T	W		L		T
Oregon State +	6	–	2	–	0	8	–	2	–	0
No. 17 Oregon ^ +	6	–	2	–	0	7	–	4	–	0
No. 19 UCLA	5	–	2	–	0	8	–	2	–	0
Washington State	5	–	3	–	0	6	–	4	–	0
Stanford	4	–	3	–	0	6	–	4	–	0
Washington	3	–	4	–	0	3	–	6	–	1
California	1	–	6	–	0	1	–	9	–	0
USC	1	–	6	–	0	1	–	9	–	0
Idaho	0	–	3	–	0	4	–	4	–	1
+ – Conference co-champions; ^ – Selected as Rose Bowl representative Oregon State won the rivalry game over Oregon, but PCC no-repeat rule was in effect; Rankings from Coaches Poll

The 1957 USC Trojans football team represented the University of Southern California (USC) in the 1957 college football season. In their first year under head coach Don Clark, the Trojans compiled a 1–9 record (1–6 against conference opponents), finished in a tie for seventh place in the Pacific Coast Conference, and were outscored by their opponents by a combined total of 204 to 86.

Tom Maudlin led the team in passing with 48 of 100 passes completed for 552 yards, no touchdowns and eight interceptions. Rex Johnston led the team in rushing with 74 carries for 304 yards. Larry Boies was the leading receiver with 14 catches for 144 yards and no touchdowns.

No member of the 1957 Trojans received first-team honors on the 1957 All-Pacific Coast Conference football team. Tackle Mike Henry received second-team honors from the conference coaches.

== Schedule ==
Date	Opponent	Rank	Site	Result	Attendance	Source
September 21	at No. 13 Oregon State	No. 19	Multnomah Stadium; Portland, OR	L 0–20	36,885	
September 28	No. 10 Michigan*		Los Angeles Memorial Coliseum; Los Angeles, CA	L 6–16	44,739	
October 4	Pittsburgh*		Los Angeles Memorial Coliseum; Los Angeles, CA	L 14–20	43,489	
October 19	at California		California Memorial Stadium; Berkeley, CA	L 0–12	40,000	
October 26	Washington State		Los Angeles Memorial Coliseum; Los Angeles, CA	L 12–13	24,902	
November 2	at Washington		Husky Stadium; Seattle, WA	W 19–12	28,000	
November 9	Stanford^{†}		Los Angeles Memorial Coliseum; Los Angeles, CA (rivalry)	L 7–35	51,923	
November 16	No. 16 Oregon		Los Angeles Memorial Coliseum; Los Angeles, CA	L 7–16	30,975	
November 23	UCLA		Los Angeles Memorial Coliseum; Los Angeles, CA (Victory Bell)	L 9–20	64,818	
November 30	at No. 12 Notre Dame*		Notre Dame Stadium; Notre Dame, IN (rivalry)	L 12–40	54,793	
*Non-conference game; ^{†}Homecoming; Rankings from AP Poll released prior to the game; Source:
