= Jim Prestel =

American football player (born 1937)

No. 70, 79, 72, 76
- Position: Defensive tackle

Personal information
- Born: June 28, 1937 (age 89); Indianapolis, Indiana, U.S.
- Listed height: 6 ft 5 in (1.96 m)
- Listed weight: 275 lb (125 kg)

Career information
- High school: Sacred Heart (Indianapolis)
- College: Idaho
- NFL draft: 1959: 6th round, 70th overall pick
- AFL draft: 1960: 2nd round

Career history
- Cleveland Browns (1960); Minnesota Vikings (1961–1965); New York Giants (1966); Washington Redskins (1967)

Career NFL statistics
- Fumble recoveries: 3
- Interceptions: 1
- Sacks: 19
- Stats at Pro Football Reference

James Francis Prestel (born June 28, 1937) is an American former professional football player who was a defensive lineman in the National Football League (NFL) in the 1960s. He played college football for the Idaho Vandals.

Selected in the 1959 NFL draft by the Cleveland Browns, he stayed in college, and joined the team in 1960. Prestel was with the expansion Minnesota Vikings for their first five seasons, and then one season each with the New York Giants and Washington Redskins. He retired from the NFL prior to the 1968 season.

== High school and college ==
Born and raised in Indianapolis, Indiana, Prestel graduated from its Sacred Heart High School (now Roncalli) in 1955. He ventured west to play college football for head coach Skip Stahley at the University of Idaho in Moscow, where he started for the Vandals in the Pacific Coast Conference (PCC) alongside future notable pros Jerry Kramer, Wayne Walker, and Jim Norton. Prestel was a two-sport star athlete for the Vandals, where he also lettered in basketball as a 6 ft 5 in (1.96 m) center for head coach Harlan Hodges, and made honorable mention in the PCC for the 1958–59 season.

Selected by the Browns in the sixth round of the 1959 NFL draft (70th overall), Prestel chose to remain in college; he had missed most of the 1957 season to return to Indianapolis, where his mother was terminally ill. He was granted another year of eligibility and played the 1959 season at Idaho as a fifth-year senior, and was elected captain by his Vandal teammates.

Prestel broke his left foot in practice prior to the Battle of the Palouse game with Washington State in October 1959, but played the first half of the game anyway. He missed the remainder of the football season (four games), the East-West Shrine Game, and the entire basketball season, but was All-Coast honorable mention in football. Prestel played in the College All-Star Game at Soldier Field in August 1960, against the defending NFL champion Baltimore Colts.

== Retirement ==
As of 2023, Prestel resides in Parker, Colorado.
