= Joe Francis (American football) =

American football player (1936–2013)

- Francis at Oregon State, c. 1957

No. 20, 26
- Positions: Quarterback, halfback

Personal information
- Born: April 21, 1936; Honolulu, Hawaii, U.S.
- Died: April 15, 2013 (aged 76); Kaneohe, Hawaii, U.S.
- Listed height: 6 ft 1 in (1.85 m)
- Listed weight: 195 lb (88 kg)

Career information
- High school: Kamehameha Schools (Honolulu)
- College: Oregon State (1954–1957)
- NFL draft: 1958: 5th round, 51st overall pick

Career history
- Green Bay Packers (1958–1959); Montreal Alouettes (1961–1962)

Awards and highlights
- Pop Warner Trophy (1957); First-team All-PCC (1957); 2× Second-team All-PCC (1955, 1956); Bill Hayward Award (1957); Oregon Sports Hall of Fame (1981); OSU Athletics Hall of Fame (1991)

Career NFL statistics
- Passing attempts: 49
- Passing completions: 20
- Completion percentage: 40.8%
- TD–INT: 2–3
- Passing yards: 266
- Passer rating: 46.8
- Stats at Pro Football Reference

Joseph Charles Naekauna Francis Jr. (April 21, 1936 – April 15, 2013) was an American professional football player who was a halfback and quarterback in the National Football League (NFL) and Canadian Football League (CFL). He played college football for the Oregon State Beavers. Following his playing career, he was a high school football head coach in his native Hawaii.

== Early life ==
Born and raised in Honolulu, Hawaii, Francis attended Kamehameha Schools in Honolulu and starred in football and graduated in 1954.

Francis played college football in the Pacific Coast Conference at Oregon State College in Corvallis, where he was a left halfback from 1954 to 1957 for head coaches Kip Taylor and Tommy Prothro. As a junior in 1956, Francis led the Beavers to the Rose Bowl, where they lost to Iowa, 35–19. He rushed for 73 yards and contributed 207 yards of total offense in the losing effort.

Francis was named the team MVP for the 1956 and 1957 seasons. He won the Pop Warner Trophy as the outstanding senior player on the Pacific Coast, and the Hayward Award as the outstanding amateur athlete in the state of Oregon in 1957. Oregon State was Coast champion again with Oregon, whom they defeated in the Civil War in Eugene, but the PCC had a no-repeat clause for the Rose Bowl, so the Ducks went instead.

== Playing career ==
Francis was selected in the fifth round of the 1958 NFL draft, 51st overall, by the Green Bay Packers. This was one of the top drafts by a team in NFL history; ahead of Francis, the Packers selected linebacker Dan Currie (3rd), fullback Jim Taylor (15th), linebacker Ray Nitschke (36th), and guard Jerry Kramer (39th).

As a rookie in 1958 under first-year head coach Ray "Scooter" McLean, Francis started one game as quarterback, the season finale, and played behind Babe Parilli and Bart Starr in the Packers' worst-ever season, finishing with a league low 1–10–1. McLean's one-year contract was not renewed; he resigned days after the season and was succeeded in January 1959 by Vince Lombardi. Francis saw limited action that season, relieving starter Lamar McHan on November 1, then didn't play again, as Starr became the starter. Francis broke his left leg early in training camp in 1960, ending his season, then incurred a knee injury in an intrasquad game in 1961, and was waived.

Francis then played 1½ seasons in the Canadian Football League (CFL) with the Montreal Alouettes in 1961 and 1962. He was sidelined most of 1961 and had off-season knee surgery.

== After football ==
Upon retiring from pro football, Francis returned to Corvallis and was an assistant at Oregon State under head coach Prothro in 1963 and 1964. He then returned to Hawaii to become a physical education teacher and football coach at Pearl City High School, and retired in 2001.

== Personal life ==
Francis married three times and fathered eleven children: nine sons and two daughters.

A son, Jon Francis (b.1964), played running back for Colorado State in the WAC and Boise State in the Big Sky Conference. He was selected in the seventh round (184th overall) of the 1986 NFL draft by the New York Giants and played for the Los Angeles Rams in 1987. Another son, Ikaika Alama-Francis (b.1984), was a defensive end for the University of Hawaii and was selected in the second round (58th overall) of the 2007 NFL draft by the Detroit Lions. He played five seasons in the league, two with Detroit and three with the Miami Dolphins.

== Death and honors ==
After an extended illness, Francis died at his Kaneohe home at age 76 in 2013.

He was elected to the Oregon Sports Hall of Fame in 1981.
