= W. J. Voit Memorial Trophy =

College football award

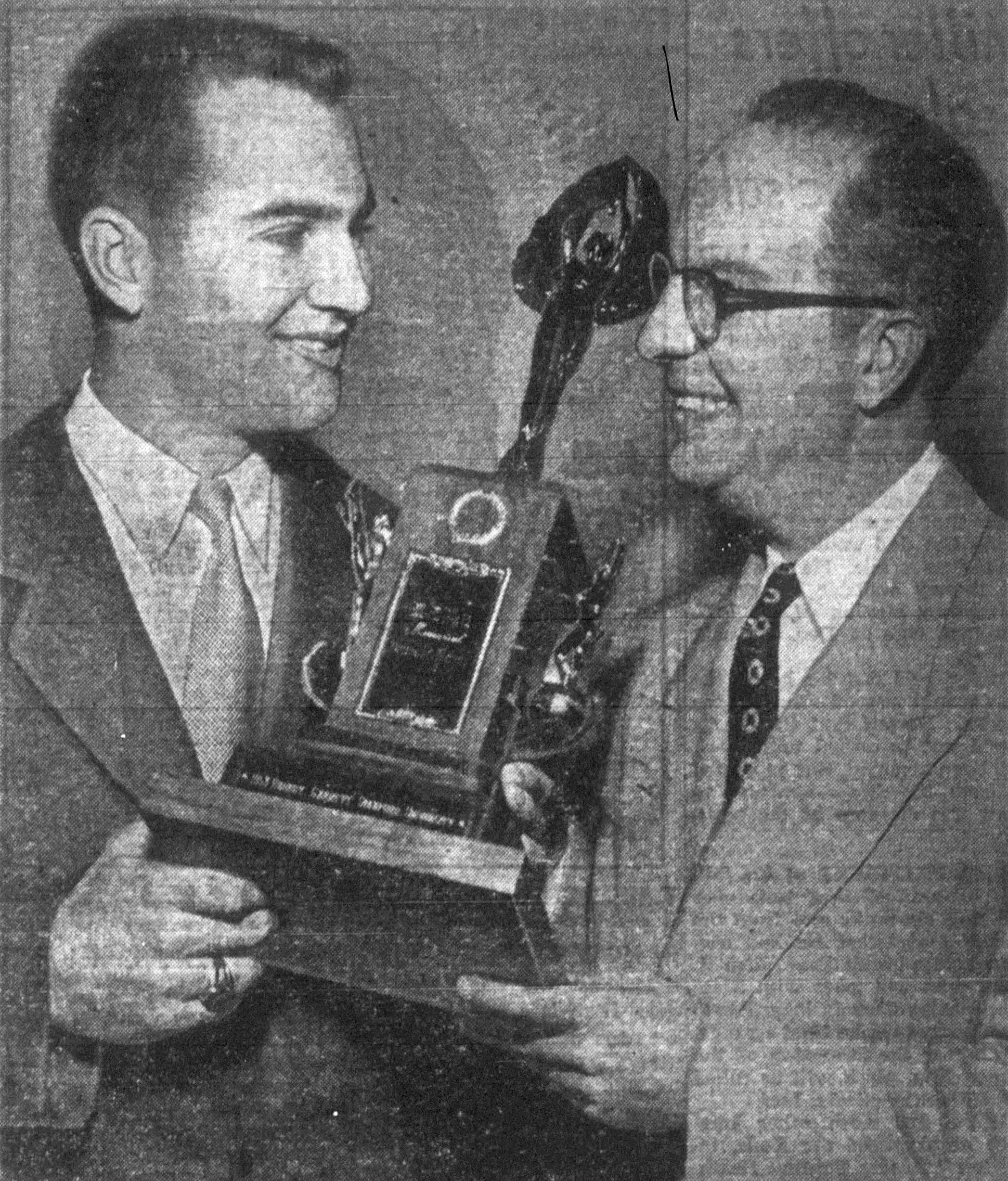
The Voit Trophy is presented to Bobby Garrett (left) in 1953.

The W. J. Voit Memorial Trophy was awarded by the Helms Athletic Foundation from 1951 to 1978 to the outstanding college football player on the Pacific Coast. The recipient was determined based on votes cast by West Coast football writers and later broadcasters as well. Award recipients include College Football Hall of Fame inductees, O. J. Simpson, Mike Garrett, Jim Plunkett, Joe Kapp, Craig Morton, Billy Kilmer, and Anthony Davis.

== History ==
The trophy was named after German American entrepreneur William J. Voit (1881–1946), the founder of the W.J. Voit Rubber Company. In the 1950s and 1960s, a representative of the Voit organization presented the trophy at a banquet preceding the Rose Bowl game. In 1969, a Los Angeles Times columnist wrote the following about the Voit Trophy tradition:

"Jim Plunkett was in Pasadena Monday to receive the 19th Annual Voit Memorial Trophy, which goes to the Pacific Coast's top player. The trophy stands nearly as high as most men who receive it, but Plunkett dwarfed the thing. ... The Voit Trophy, though, is an accurate mirror of later success in professional ball. Three of the NFL's top quarterbacks -- Joe Kapp, Billy Kilmer and Craig Morton -- all won it, as did such other pro players as Mike Garrett, Gary Beban and O. J. Simpson. Since the award was instituted in 1951, only one winner has failed to play pro ball of some sort."

In addition to the notable NFL players to win the Voit Trophy, the runners-up in the Voit voting included such Hall of Fame players as John Brodie (Voit runner-up in 1956), Mel Renfro (Voit runner-up in 1963), and Hugh McElhenny (Voit runner-up in 1951).

Unlike the Pop Warner Trophy, awarded each year to the top senior football player on the West Coast, the Voit Trophy was open to underclassmen. Accordingly, three players received the Voit Trophy in multiple years. The multi-year winners of the award are USC Trojans running back Jon Arnett (1955 and 1956), Stanford Cardinal quarterback Jim Plunkett (1969 and 1970), and USC tailback Anthony Davis (1972 and 1974).

USC and Stanford athletes won the Voit Trophy more than those at any other school, with USC athletes taking the trophy nine times and Stanford athletes doing so six times.

In 1975, the Pac-10 Conference began awarding its own Player of the Year award, diminishing the significance of the Voit Trophy. The award of the trophy was discontinued shortly thereafter.

== Recipients ==
Recipients of the Voit Trophy are as follows:

Year	Recipient	Position	School	Points	Runners-up	Source
1951	Bill McColl	End	Stanford	31	Hugh McElhenny, Washington (27), Ollie Matson, USF (24)	
1952	Jim Sears	Halfback	USC	53	Donn Moomaw, UCLA (45), Elmer Wilhoite, USC (20)	
1953	Bobby Garrett	Quarterback	Stanford	78	Paul Cameron, UCLA (42), Paul Larson, QB, California (25)	
1954	Paul Larson	QB	California	50	George Shaw, Oregon (41), Jack Ellena, UCLA (36)	
1955	Jon Arnett	Back	USC			
1956	Jon Arnett	Back	USC	72	John Brodie, Stanford (55), John Witte, Oregon St. (27)	
1957	Dick Wallen	End	UCLA	60	Bob Newman, Wash. St. (30), Joe Francis, Oregon St. (26)	
1958	Joe Kapp	Quarterback	California	117	Dick Bass, College of the Pacific (36), Chris Burford, Oregon St. (19)	
1959	Bob Schloredt	Quarterback	Washington	110	Chris Burford, Stanford (38)	
1960	Billy Kilmer	Tailback	UCLA		Roy McKasson, Washington, Marlin McKeever, USC	
1961	Hugh Campbell	Wide receiver	Wash. St.	59	Terry Baker, Oregon St. (33), Bobby Smith, UCLA	
1962	Terry Baker	Quarterback	Oregon St.	133	Hal Bedsole, USC (43)	
1963	Vern Burke	Split end	Oregon St.	57	Mel Renfro, Oregon (45), Craig Morton, California (38)	
1964	Craig Morton	Quarterback	California	96	Mike Garrett, USC (57), Bob Berry, Oregon (49)	
1965	Mike Garrett	Tailback	USC	147	Gary Beban, UCLA (80), Ray Handley, Stanford (7)	
1966	Pete Pifer	Fullback	Oregon St.	102	Gary Beban, UCLA (80), Mel Farr, UCLA (63)	
1967	Gary Beban	Quarterback	UCLA	153	O. J. Simpson, USC (119), Bill Enyart, Oregon St. (7)	
1968	O. J. Simpson	Tailback	USC	180	Bill Enyart, Oregon St. (55), Gene Washington, Stanford (30)	
1969	Jim Plunkett	Quarterback	Stanford	128	Dennis Shaw, San Diego St. (54), Jimmy Gunn USC (17)	
1970	Jim Plunkett	Quarterback	Stanford	158	Dennis Dummit, UCLA (49), Sonny Sixkiller, Washington (30)	
1971	Don Bunce	Quarterback	Stanford	81	Bernard Jackson, Wash. St. (72), Jeff Siemon, Stanford (20)	
1972	Anthony Davis	Tailback	USC	107	Charle Young, USC (32); Dan Fouts, Oregon (30)	
1973	Kermit Johnson	Halfback	UCLA			
1974	Anthony Davis	Tailback	USC			
1975	Chuck Muncie	Halfback	California	109	John Sciarra, UCLA (49), Ricky Bell (44)	
1976	Ricky Bell	Tailback	USC	120	Jeff Dankworth, UCLA (31), Duncan McColl, Stanford (27)	
1977	Guy Benjamin	Quarterback	Stanford		Warren Moon	
1978	Charles White	Tailback	USC			

== See also ==
- Pop Warner Trophy
