= William Steiger =

William Steiger may refer to:

- Bill Steiger (American football), American football player
- William A. Steiger, U.S. Representative from Wisconsin
- William R. Steiger, political appointee in the U.S. Department of Health and Human Services under George W. Bush
