= 1957 Stanford Indians football team =

American college football season

1957 Stanford Indians football
- Conference: Pacific Coast Conference
- Record: 6–4 (4–3 PCC)
- Head coach: Chuck Taylor (7th season)
- Home stadium: Stanford Stadium

1957 Pacific Coast Conference football standings
	Conf.					Overall
Team	W		L		T	W		L		T
Oregon State +	6	–	2	–	0	8	–	2	–	0
No. 17 Oregon ^ +	6	–	2	–	0	7	–	4	–	0
No. 19 UCLA	5	–	2	–	0	8	–	2	–	0
Washington State	5	–	3	–	0	6	–	4	–	0
Stanford	4	–	3	–	0	6	–	4	–	0
Washington	3	–	4	–	0	3	–	6	–	1
California	1	–	6	–	0	1	–	9	–	0
USC	1	–	6	–	0	1	–	9	–	0
Idaho	0	–	3	–	0	4	–	4	–	1
+ – Conference co-champions; ^ – Selected as Rose Bowl representative Oregon State won the rivalry game over Oregon, but PCC no-repeat rule was in effect; Rankings from Coaches Poll

The 1957 Stanford Indians football team represented Stanford University in the 1957 college football season. The team was coached by Chuck Taylor in his seventh year as head coach. Taylor was a popular coach who had led Stanford to the 1952 Rose Bowl, had been an All-American player for the Indians, and starred on the undefeated 1940 "Wow Boys" team that won the 1941 Rose Bowl and the national championship in several polls. Just before the team's final game against archrival California, Taylor announced he was retiring as head coach to become assistant athletic director of the university.

== Schedule ==
Date	Opponent	Rank	Site	Result	Attendance	Source
September 21	San Jose State*		Stanford Stadium; Stanford, CA (rivalry)	W 46–7	26,000	
September 28	Northwestern*	No. 16	Stanford Stadium; Stanford, CA	W 26–6	19,000	
October 5	at Rice*	No. 17	Rice Stadium; Houston, TX	L 7–34	54,000	
October 12	Washington State		Stanford Stadium; Stanford, CA	L 18–21	25,000	
October 19	at Washington		Husky Stadium; Seattle, WA	W 21–14	36,000	
October 26	No. 15 UCLA		Stanford Stadium; Stanford, CA	W 20–6	46,000	
November 2	No. 15 Oregon		Stanford Stadium; Stanford, CA	L 26–27	56,000	
November 9	at USC		Los Angeles Memorial Coliseum; Los Angeles, CA (rivalry)	W 35–7	51,923	
November 16	at Oregon State		Parker Stadium; Corvallis, OR	L 14–24	20,000	
November 23	California		Stanford Stadium; Stanford, CA (Big Game)	W 14–12	91,000	
*Non-conference game; Rankings from AP Poll released prior to the game; Source:

== Game summaries ==
=== California ===
Team	1	2	3	4	Total
Bears	0	6	0	6	12
• Indians	0	7	7	0	14

- Date: November 23
- Location: Stanford Stadium, Stanford, California
- Game attendance: 91,000

Scoring summary
1	STAN	Chuck Shea 9-yard run (Al Harrington kick)	STAN 7–0
2	CAL	Darrell Roberts 1-yard run (Roberts kick blocked)	STAN 7–6
3	STAN	Jack Douglas 1-yard run (Harrington kick)	STAN 14–6
4	CAL	Steve Glagola 44-yard pass from Joe Kapp (2-point conversion failed)	STAN 14–12

The 60th Big Game was held just a few days after Stanford head coach Taylor announced he would step down following the end of the season to serve as the school's assistant athletic director. Coming into the game, the Indians had won just once in Taylor's 6 previous Big Games, but vowed to win this game for their beloved head coach. Although Stanford had relied on its passing attack from quarterback Jack Douglas all season, it was the running game that gave the team the lead in the second quarter on fullback Chuck Shea's 9-yard run. Shea would rush for 155 yards on the day. California answered, but the point after was blocked, and Stanford nursed a 7–6 lead into the third quarter, when Douglas ran in for another score. California answered late, but the Indians held on to fulfill their vow to their outgoing coach and bring the overall Big Game series record at 25–25–10. Taylor would become Stanford's athletic director in 1963 and serve in that role until 1971.
