= 1957 Washington Huskies football team =

American college football season

1957 Washington Huskies football
- Conference: Pacific Coast Conference
- Record: 3–6–1 (3–4 PCC)
- Head coach: Jim Owens (1st season)
- Captains: Whitey Core; Jim Jones
- Home stadium: University of Washington Stadium

1957 Pacific Coast Conference football standings
	Conf.					Overall
Team	W		L		T	W		L		T
Oregon State +	6	–	2	–	0	8	–	2	–	0
No. 17 Oregon ^ +	6	–	2	–	0	7	–	4	–	0
No. 19 UCLA	5	–	2	–	0	8	–	2	–	0
Washington State	5	–	3	–	0	6	–	4	–	0
Stanford	4	–	3	–	0	6	–	4	–	0
Washington	3	–	4	–	0	3	–	6	–	1
California	1	–	6	–	0	1	–	9	–	0
USC	1	–	6	–	0	1	–	9	–	0
Idaho	0	–	3	–	0	4	–	4	–	1
+ – Conference co-champions; ^ – Selected as Rose Bowl representative Oregon State won the rivalry game over Oregon, but PCC no-repeat rule was in effect; Rankings from Coaches Poll

The 1957 Washington Huskies football team was an American football team that represented the University of Washington during the 1957 college football season. In its first season under head coach Jim Owens, the team compiled a 3–6–1 record, sixth in the Pacific Coast Conference, and was outscored 212 to 120.

Following the previous season, first-year head coach Darrell Royal left for Texas in December, after less than ten months in Seattle. Hired in January, Owens was a teammate of Royal's at Oklahoma and was an assistant coach under Bear Bryant for the previous six years at Kentucky and Texas A&M.

== Schedule ==
Date	Opponent	Site	Result	Attendance	Source
September 21	Colorado*	University of Washington Stadium; Seattle, WA	T 6–6	32,500	
September 28	at No. 6 Minnesota*	Memorial Stadium; Minneapolis, MN	L 7–46	63,512	
October 5	Ohio State*	University of Washington Stadium; Seattle, WA	L 7–35	37,500	
October 12	at UCLA	Los Angeles Memorial Coliseum; Los Angeles, CA	L 0–19	24,889	
October 19	Stanford^{†}	University of Washington Stadium; Seattle, WA	L 14–21	36,000	
October 26	Oregon State	University of Washington Stadium; Seattle, WA	W 19–6	29,000	
November 2	USC	University of Washington Stadium; Seattle, WA	L 12–19	28,000	
November 9	at Oregon	Multnomah Stadium; Portland, OR (rivalry)	W 13–6	30,010	
November 16	at California	California Memorial Stadium; Berkeley, CA	W 35–27	38,000	
November 23	Washington State	University of Washington Stadium; Seattle, WA (rivalry)	L 7–27	47,500	
*Non-conference game; ^{†}Homecoming; Rankings from AP Poll released prior to the game; Source:

== NFL draft selections ==
Two University of Washington Huskies were selected in the 1958 NFL draft, which lasted 30 rounds with 360 selections.

= Husky Hall of Fame

Player	Position	Round	Pick	NFL club
Jim Jones	Back	3rd	30	Los Angeles Rams
Dick Day	Tackle	5th	57	New York Giants
