= 1957 Idaho Vandals football team =

American college football season

1957 Idaho Vandals football
- Conference: Pacific Coast Conference
- Record: 4–4–1 (0–3 PCC)
- Head coach: Skip Stahley (4th season)
- Home stadium: Neale Stadium

1957 Pacific Coast Conference football standings
	Conf.					Overall
Team	W		L		T	W		L		T
Oregon State +	6	–	2	–	0	8	–	2	–	0
No. 17 Oregon ^ +	6	–	2	–	0	7	–	4	–	0
No. 19 UCLA	5	–	2	–	0	8	–	2	–	0
Washington State	5	–	3	–	0	6	–	4	–	0
Stanford	4	–	3	–	0	6	–	4	–	0
Washington	3	–	4	–	0	3	–	6	–	1
California	1	–	6	–	0	1	–	9	–	0
USC	1	–	6	–	0	1	–	9	–	0
Idaho	0	–	3	–	0	4	–	4	–	1
+ – Conference co-champions; ^ – Selected as Rose Bowl representative Oregon State won the rivalry game over Oregon, but PCC no-repeat rule was in effect; Rankings from Coaches Poll

The 1957 Idaho Vandals football team represented the University of Idaho in the 1957 college football season. The Vandals were led by fourth-year head coach Skip Stahley and were members of the Pacific Coast Conference. Home games were played on campus at Neale Stadium in Moscow, with one home game in Boise at old Bronco Stadium at Boise Junior College. Led on the field by quarterbacks Howard Willis and Gary Kenworthy, Idaho compiled a 4–4–1 overall record and were 0–3 in the PCC.

The Vandals suffered a third straight loss in the Battle of the Palouse with neighbor Washington State, falling 21–13 at Rogers Field in Pullman on November 16. The loss prevented the first winning season for Idaho football since 1938. In the rivalry game with Montana, the Vandals ran their winning streak over the Grizzlies to six and retained the Little Brown Stein.

== Schedule ==
Date	Time	Opponent	Site	Result	Attendance	Source
September 21	1:30 pm	Oregon	Neale Stadium; Moscow, ID	L 6–9	10,000	
September 28	7:00 pm	at Arizona State*	Goodwin Stadium; Tempe, AZ	L 7–19	16,000	
October 5	1:00 pm	Utah*	old Bronco Stadium; Boise, ID	W 21–6	9,000	
October 12	1:30 pm	at No. 7 Oregon State	Parker Stadium; Corvallis, OR	L 0–20	14,600	
October 19	8:00 pm	at Pacific (CA)*	Pacific Memorial Stadium; Stockton, CA	T 7–7	17,000	
October 26	1:30 pm	Fresno State*^{†}	Neale Stadium; Moscow, ID	W 20–6	5,000	
November 2	1:30 pm	Montana*	Neale Stadium; Moscow, ID (Little Brown Stein)	W 31–13	4,000	
November 9	12:30 pm	at Utah State*	old Romney Stadium; Logan, UT	W 35–7	3,954	
November 16	1:30 pm	at Washington State	Rogers Field; Pullman, WA (Battle of the Palouse)	L 13–21	13,400	
*Non-conference game; ^{†}Homecoming; Rankings from Coaches' Poll released prior to the game; All times are in Pacific time; Source:

== Notable players ==
The 1957 Vandal team had several players who went on to extended careers in professional football. Jerry Kramer of Sandpoint played eleven seasons at right guard with the Green Bay Packers and won five NFL titles (and the first two Super Bowls) under head coach Vince Lombardi. He was an All-Pro five times and was the lead blocker on the famous Packers sweep. Kramer made the NFL's all-decade team for the 1960s and was the last member of the NFL's 50th anniversary team to be inducted into Pro Football Hall of Fame, at age 82 in 2018.

Wayne Walker of Boise played fifteen seasons with the Detroit Lions as an outside linebacker and was named All-Pro three times. Both were selected in the fourth round of the 1958 NFL draft; Kramer was 39th overall and Walker 45th, and both were periodic placekickers as pros. (As Vandals, Kramer was the kicker and Walker was the long snapper.)

Sophomore Jim Norton of Fullerton, California, was a safety and punter for nine seasons with the Houston Oilers; he was the all-time interceptions leader in the American Football League and his #43 was the first retired by the franchise.

Jim Prestel of Indianapolis was a defensive tackle for eight seasons in the NFL, primarily with the expansion Minnesota Vikings. A junior in 1957, he missed most of the season due to his mother's terminal illness. Selected in the sixth round of the 1959 NFL draft, 70th overall, he was granted another year of eligibility and played for Idaho in 1959 and began his pro career with the Cleveland Browns in 1960. Prestel was also a standout player on the Vandal basketball team. He played in his final game at Idaho in the Battle of the Palouse in late October with a broken foot, then was sidelined and missed the basketball season.

== Roster ==
1957 Idaho Vandals football team roster
Players
Coaches
Offense

Pos.	#	Name	Class
G, DT	64	Jerry Kramer (C)	Sr
C, LB	53	Wayne Walker	Sr
HB, S	46	Jim Norton	So
T, DT	79	Jim Prestel	Jr
E	82	Larry Aldrich	Sr
E	80	Wade Patterson	Jr
QB	14	Howard Willis (C)	Sr
QB	18	Gary Kenworthy	Sr
QB	16	Gary Farnworth	So
HB	24	Lloyd Fenton	Sr
HB	43	Bob Dehlinger	Jr
FB	37	Ken Hall	Jr
OT	72	Tony Anderson	Sr
G	65	Dale Hill	Jr
E	85	J.D. Lawson	Jr
OT	74	Pete Johnson	Jr
G	60	Jerry Smythe	Sr
OT	71	Steve Symms	So

Defense

Pos.	#	Name	Class

Special teams

Pos.	#	Name	Class
K	64	Jerry Kramer	Sr
LS	53	Wayne Walker	Sr
P	46	Jim Norton	So

Head coach

- Skip Stahley (4th year)

Coordinators/assistant coaches

- Ed Knecht (backs)
- J. V. Johnson (ends)
- Don Swartz (line)
- Wayne D. Anderson (freshmen)

Legend

- (C) Team captain
- (S) Suspended
- (I) Ineligible
- Injured
- Redshirt

== All-Coast ==
Because of their limited conference schedule, no Vandals were on the All-PCC first team (eleven spots), but two were selected for the second team; guard Jerry Kramer and center Wayne Walker. Honorable mention were quarterback Howard Willis, end Larry Aldrich, and fullback Ken Hall.

== NFL draft ==
Five Vandals were selected in the 1958 NFL draft:

Player	Position	Round	Pick	Franchise
Jerry Kramer	G	4th	39	Green Bay Packers
Wayne Walker	C	4th	45	Detroit Lions
Larry Aldrich	E	11th	127	Pittsburgh Steelers
Wade Patterson ^	E	16th	183	Chicago Cardinals
Pete Johnson ^	T	18th	216	Cleveland Browns

^ Patterson and Johnson were granted another year of eligibility and played for Idaho in 1958.

One junior was selected in the 1959 NFL draft:

Player	Position	Round	Pick	Franchise
Jim Prestel ^	T	6th	70	Cleveland Browns

^ Prestel was granted another year of eligibility and played for Idaho in 1959.

Two sophomores were selected in the 1960 NFL draft:

Player	Position	Round	Pick	Franchise
Jim Norton	WR	7th	75	Detroit Lions
Stan Fanning	T	11th	128	Chicago Bears
