= 1957 California Golden Bears football team =

American college football season

1957 California Golden Bears football
- Conference: Pacific Coast Conference
- Record: 1–9 (1–6 PCC)
- Head coach: Pete Elliott (1st season)
- Home stadium: California Memorial Stadium

1957 Pacific Coast Conference football standings
	Conf.					Overall
Team	W		L		T	W		L		T
Oregon State +	6	–	2	–	0	8	–	2	–	0
No. 17 Oregon ^ +	6	–	2	–	0	7	–	4	–	0
No. 19 UCLA	5	–	2	–	0	8	–	2	–	0
Washington State	5	–	3	–	0	6	–	4	–	0
Stanford	4	–	3	–	0	6	–	4	–	0
Washington	3	–	4	–	0	3	–	6	–	1
California	1	–	6	–	0	1	–	9	–	0
USC	1	–	6	–	0	1	–	9	–	0
Idaho	0	–	3	–	0	4	–	4	–	1
+ – Conference co-champions; ^ – Selected as Rose Bowl representative Oregon State won the rivalry game over Oregon, but PCC no-repeat rule was in effect; Rankings from Coaches Poll

The 1957 California Golden Bears football team was an American football team that represented the University of California, Berkeley in the Pacific Coast Conference (PCC) during the 1957 college football season. In their first year under head coach Pete Elliott, the Golden Bears compiled a 1–9 record (1–6 in PCC, seventh), and were outscored 176 to 109. Home games were played on campus at California Memorial Stadium in Berkeley, California.

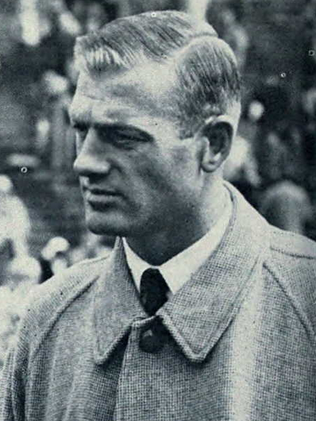
The 1957 season was the first for head coach Pete Elliott.

California's statistical leaders on offense were junior quarterback Joe Kapp with 580 passing yards and Jack Hart with 396 rushing yards and 276 receiving yards. Kapp was later inducted into the College Football Hall of Fame.

== Schedule ==
Date	Opponent	Site	Result	Attendance	Source
September 21	SMU*	California Memorial Stadium; Berkeley, CA	L 6–13	45,000	
September 28	at Washington State	Rogers Field; Pullman, WA	L 7–13	16,000	
October 5	No. 2 Michigan State*	California Memorial Stadium; Berkeley, CA	L 0–19	40,000	
October 12	Navy*	California Memorial Stadium; Berkeley, CA	L 6–21	47,000	
October 19	USC	California Memorial Stadium; Berkeley, CA	W 12–0	40,000	
October 26	at No. 18 Oregon	Hayward Field; Eugene, OR	L 6–24	18,321	
November 2	at UCLA	Los Angeles Memorial Coliseum; Los Angeles, CA (rivalry)	L 14–16	44,772	
November 9	Oregon State	California Memorial Stadium; Berkeley, CA	L 19–21	50,000	
November 16	Washington	California Memorial Stadium; Berkeley, CA	L 27–35	38,000	
November 23	at Stanford	Stanford Stadium; Stanford, CA (Big Game)	L 12–14	91,000	
*Non-conference game; Rankings from AP Poll released prior to the game; Source:

== Roster ==
Program for the November 9 game against the Oregon State College Beavers.

1957 California Golden Bears football team roster
Players			Coaches
Offense: Pos. / # / Name / Class; QB / 22 / Joe Kapp / Jr	Defense: Pos. / # / Name / Class	Special teams: Pos. / # / Name / Class	Head coach: Pete Elliot (1st season); Coordinators/assistant coaches: Dee Andros; John Ralston; Bill Taylor; Buck McPhail; Gene Stauber; Rod Franz; Legend: (C) Team captain; (S) Suspended; (I) Ineligible; Injured; Redshirt
