= Jim Norton (safety) =

American football player (1938–2007)

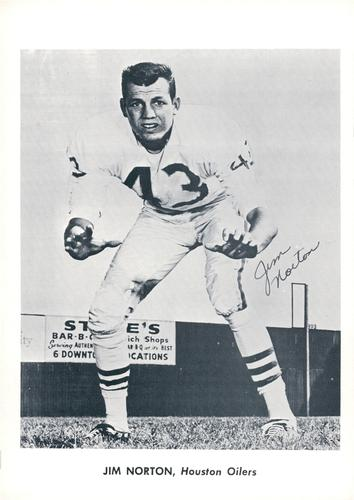
- Norton with the Houston Oilers in 1961

No. 43
- Positions: Safety, punter

Personal information
- Born: October 20, 1938; Glendale, California, U.S.
- Died: June 12, 2007 (aged 68); Garland, Texas, U.S.
- Listed height: 6 ft 3 in (1.91 m)
- Listed weight: 190 lb (86 kg)

Career information
- High school: Fullerton Union (Fullerton, California)
- College: Idaho
- NFL draft: 1960: 7th round, 75th overall pick
- AFL draft: 1960

Career history
- Houston Oilers (1960–1968)

Awards and highlights
- 2× AFL champion (1960, 1961); 3× All-AFL (1961, 1962, 1967); 3× AFL All-Star (1962, 1963, 1967); AFL punting yards leader (1965); Titans/Oilers Ring of Honor; Tennessee Titans No. 43 retired

Career AFL statistics
- Interceptions: 45
- Interception yards: 592
- Fumble recoveries: 3
- Defensive touchdowns: 1
- Punts: 522
- Punting yards: 21,961
- Punting average: 42.1
- Longest punt: 79
- Stats at Pro Football Reference

James Charles Norton (October 20, 1938 – June 12, 2007) was an American professional football safety and punter who played for the Houston Oilers of the American Football League (AFL). An original member of the Oilers franchise, he played in their first nine seasons from 1960 to 1968. Norton was an AFL All-Star for three seasons and holds the franchise record for career interceptions. His jersey No. 43 was the first of eight retired by the Oilers/Titans franchise.

== Early life ==
Born and raised in Southern California, Norton graduated from Fullerton Union High School in 1956 and played college football for head coach Skip Stahley at Idaho, alongside future pros Jerry Kramer, Wayne Walker, and Jim Prestel in the Pacific Coast Conference. Nicknamed "Flamingo," Norton played defensive back and tight end, and also punted and returned kicks for the Vandals. Selected in the seventh round of in the 1960 NFL draft (75th overall) by the Detroit Lions and the Dallas Texans in the AFL's inaugural draft in 1960, he signed as an original Houston Oiler.

== Professional career ==
Although Norton intercepted only one pass in his rookie season in 1960, he went on to become the AFL's all-time interception leader at the time he retired in April 1969 (45 interceptions), and ranked second all-time in interceptions in AFL history behind Dave Grayson's 47 interceptions after the AFL's final season in 1969. In 1961, his first starting season, he snared nine passes and punted with a 40.7-yard average. In a tight defensive duel in the AFL Championship Game, his four booming punts helped Houston defeat the San Diego Chargers, 10–3, claiming their second AFL championship in as many seasons.

While nursing a slim half-game lead in the Eastern Division in Week 12 of the 1962 AFL season, Norton personally tormented Denver Broncos quarterback Frank Tripucka. He stopped three Bronco drives with interceptions as the Oilers stole a 34–17 victory and a berth in their third straight AFL Championship Game. That thriller for the 1962 AFL crown was the league's longest game, a double-overtime contest won by the Dallas Texans, 20–17.

As a defensive back, Norton was a steady tackler with a nose for the football. His play earned him All-AFL honors for 1961, '62, '63, and '67, when he scored the only touchdown of his career, returning an interception 56 yards. His number 43 was the first retired by the Oilers, acknowledging his club-record 45 career interceptions, which he returned for 592 yards and a touchdown, and 519 punts. The Oilers/Titans later retired the numbers of Elvin Bethea, Earl Campbell, Mike Munchak, Bruce Matthews, Warren Moon, Steve McNair, and Eddie George.

== See also ==
- List of American Football League players
