= 1957 All-Pacific Coast football team =

American all-star college football team

The 1957 All-Pacific Coast football team consists of American football players chosen by various organizations for All-Pacific Coast teams for the 1957 college football season.

== Selections ==
=== Backs ===
- Bob Newman, Washington State (AP-1 [quarterback]; Coaches-1; UP-1)
- Jim Shanley, Oregon (AP-1 [halfback]; Coaches-1; UP-1)
- Joe Francis, Oregon State (AP-1 [halfback]; Coaches-1; UP-1)
- Jim Jones, Washington (AP-1 [fullback]; Coaches-1; UP-1)
- Jack Douglas, Stanford (AP-2; Coaches-2; UP-2)
- Chuck Shea, Stanford (AP-2; Coaches-2; UP-2)
- Jack Morris, Oregon (AP-2; Coaches-2; UP-2)
- Nub Beamer, Oregon State (AP-2; Coaches-2)
- Earnel Durden, Oregon State (Coaches-2)
- Joe Kapp, California (Coaches-2)
- Bob Mulgrado, Arizona State (UP-2)

=== Ends ===
- Don Ellingsen, Washington State (AP-1; Coaches-1; UP-1)
- Dick Wallen, UCLA (AP-1; Coaches-1; UP-1)
- Ron Stover, Oregon (AP-2; Coaches-2; UP-2)
- Gary Van Galder, Stanford (Coaches-2; UP-2)
- Ron Wheatcroft, Oregon (AP-2; Coaches-2)
- Bob DeGrant, Oregon State (Coaches-2)

=== Tackles ===
- Troy Barbee, Stanford (AP-1; Coaches-1; UP-1)
- Bill Leeka, UCLA (AP-1; Coaches-1; UP-1)
- Ted Bates, Oregon (AP-2; Coaches-2; UP-2)
- Dave Jesmer, Oregon State (AP-2; Coaches-2; UP-2)
- Mike Henry, USC (Coaches-2)

=== Guards ===
- Harry Mondale, Oregon (AP-1; Coaches-1; UP-1)
- Jerry Kramer, Idaho (AP-2; Coaches-1; UP-2)
- Jim Brackins, Oregon State (Coaches-2; UP-1)
- John "Whitey" Core, Washington (AP-1; Coaches-2)
- Walt Garasich, USC (AP-2)
- Al Carr, Arizona State (UP-2)

=== Centers ===
- Francis "Buzz" Randall, Oregon State (AP-1; Coaches-1)
- Marv Bergmann, Washington (UP-1)
- Wayne Walker, Idaho (AP-2; Coaches-2)
- Merl Hitzel, Washington State (UP-2)

== Key ==
AP = Associated Press, selected by three regional AP sports editors in Seattle, San Francisco, and Los Angeles

Coaches = selected by the conference coaches

UP = United Press

Bold = Consensus first-team selection of at least two of the selectors from among the AP, UP and conference coaches

== See also ==
- 1957 College Football All-America Team
