= 1956 All-Pacific Coast football team =

American all-star college football team

The 1956 All-Pacific Coast Conference football team consists of American football players chosen by the Associated Press (AP) and the United Press (UP) as the best college football players by position in the Pacific Coast region during the 1956 college football season. The AP team was limited to players form the Pacific Coast Conference (PCC) and was based on votes of football writers of AP member newspapers on the west coast. The UP team included players from non-PCC schools.

The 1956 Oregon State Beavers football team won the PCC championship and placed two players on the first team: halfback Earnel Durden and tackle John Witte. Witte was a consensus first-team player on the 1956 All-America college football team.

Stanford and Washington each placed three players on the first team. Stanford quarterback John Brodie was also a consensus first-team All-American.

== Selections ==
=== Backs ===
- John Brodie, Stanford (AP-1; UP-1 [quarterback])
- Earnel Durden, Oregon State (AP-1; UP-1 [halfback])
- C. R. Roberts, USC (AP-1; UP-1 [fullback])
- Dean Derby, Washington (AP-1)
- Jon Arnett, USC (UP-1 [halfback])
- Bob Newman, Washington State (AP-2; UP-2 [quarterback])
- Joe Francis, Oregon State (AP-2; UP-2)
- Jim Shanley, Oregon (AP-2)
- Barry Billington, UCLA (AP-2)
- Paul Lowe, Oregon State (UP-2)
- Bobby Mulgado, Arizona State (UP-2)

=== Ends ===
- Bill Steiger, Washington State (AP-1; UP-1)
- Phil McHugh, Oregon (AP-1; UP-2)
- Carl Isaacs, Stanford (UP-1)
- Ron Wheatcroft, California (AP-2; UP-2)
- Hal Smith, UCLA (AP-2)

=== Tackles ===
- John Witte, Oregon State (AP-1; UP-1)
- Paul Wiggin, Stanford (AP-1; UP-1)
- George Strugar, Washington (AP-2; UP-2)
- Dave Jesmer, Oregon State (AP-2)
- John Nisby, Pacific (UP-2)

=== Guards ===
- Dick Day, Washington (AP-1; UP-1)
- Esker Harris, UCLA (AP-1; UP-2)
- Galen Laack, College of the Pacific (UP-1)
- Whitley Core, Washington (AP-2; UP-2)
- Don Gilkey, California (AP-2)

=== Centers ===
- Jim Matheny, UCLA (AP-1; UP-1)
- Karl Rubke, USC (AP-2)
- Dick Corrick, Oregon State (UP-2)

== Key ==
AP = Associated Press, with newsmen and sportscasters making the selections

UP = United Press

== See also ==
- 1956 College Football All-America Team
