= Ray Smith (running back) =

American gridiron football player

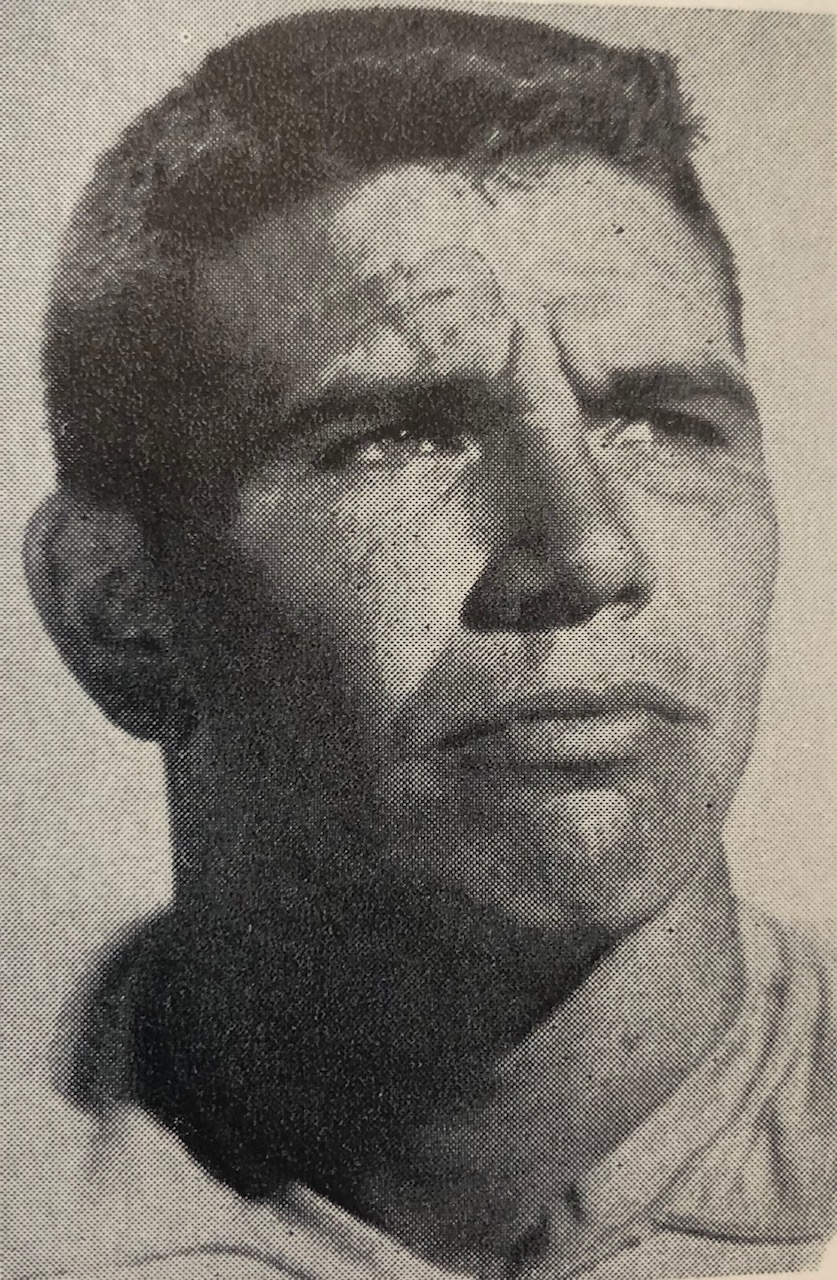
- Smith from the 1960 UCLA yearbook

Profile
- Positions: Halfback, End

Personal information
- Born: c. 1937 (age 88–89); Los Angeles, California, U.S.
- Listed height: 5 ft 11 in (1.80 m)
- Listed weight: 200 lb (91 kg)

Career information
- College: UCLA
- AFL draft: 1960

Career history
- 1960–1962: Saskatchewan Roughriders

Awards and highlights
- First-team All-PCC (1959); Second-team All-PCC (1958)

Ray Smith (born c. 1937) is an American former professional football player who played for the Saskatchewan Roughriders. He previously played football at the University of California, Los Angeles.
