= George Strugar =

American football player (1934–1997)

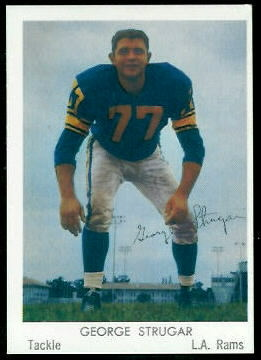
- Strugar in 1959

No. 77, 74, 73
- Position: Defensive tackle

Personal information
- Born: April 2, 1934; Cle Elum, Washington, U.S.
- Died: June 13, 1997 (aged 63); San Marino, California, U.S.
- Listed height: 6 ft 5 in (1.96 m)
- Listed weight: 239 lb (108 kg)

Career information
- High school: Renton (Renton, Washington)
- College: Washington
- NFL draft: 1957: 3rd round, 27th overall pick

Career history
- Los Angeles Rams (1957–1961); Pittsburgh Steelers (1962); New York Titans / Jets (1962-1963)

Awards and highlights
- Second-team All-PCC (1956); Huskies Hall of Fame, 1988

Career NFL/AFL statistics
- Interceptions: 1
- Fumble recoveries: 5
- Sacks: 7
- Stats at Pro Football Reference

George Ralph Strugar (April 2, 1934 – June 13, 1997) was an American professional football player who was a defensive tackle for eight seasons for the Los Angeles Rams, the Pittsburgh Steelers, and New York Titans/Jets. He died of lung cancer on June, 13 1997 at the age of 63
