= Jim Steffen =

American football player (1936–2015)

No. 20, 41
- Positions: Cornerback, safety

Personal information
- Born: May 1, 1936; Orange, California, U.S.
- Died: April 23, 2015 (aged 78); Arnold, Maryland, U.S.
- Listed height: 6 ft 0 in (1.83 m)
- Listed weight: 196 lb (89 kg)

Career information
- High school: Tustin (Tustin, California)
- College: UCLA
- NFL draft: 1959: 13th round, 149th overall pick

Career history
- Detroit Lions (1959–1961); Washington Redskins (1961–1965); Dallas Cowboys (1966)*; Washington Redskins (1968)*
- * Offseason or practice squad member only

Awards and highlights
- Second-team All-PCC (1958)

Career NFL statistics
- Interceptions: 17
- Fumble recoveries: 5
- Total touchdowns: 2
- Return yards: 1,456
- Stats at Pro Football Reference

James William Steffen (May 1, 1936 – April 23, 2015) was an American professional football defensive back in the National Football League (NFL) for the Detroit Lions, Washington Redskins and Dallas Cowboys. He was drafted in the thirteenth round of the 1959 NFL draft. He played college football at the University of California, Los Angeles.

== Early life ==
Steffen attended Tustin High School and graduated in 1954. He was an All-State selection in football, baseball and basketball.

He initially enrolled at Occidental College to play football. He transferred to Santa Ana College after his freshman season, where he played basketball and baseball. He then moved on to Orange Coast College, where he played baseball.

Steffen finally transferred to UCLA in 1956. After sitting out for a year, he walked on to the football team as a junior. Even though he was only 5' 10" and weighted less than 190 pounds, he was a tenacious tackler who played both defensive end and offensive end.

As a senior, he was named team captain, second-team All-West coast and honorable-mention All-American. He also was a key player on the UCLA baseball team.

== Professional career ==
=== Detroit Lions ===
Steffen was selected by the Detroit Lions in the thirteenth round (149th overall) of the 1959 NFL draft. He was converted into a safety. As a rookie, he appeared in 8 games with 3 starts.

In 1960, he appeared in 12 games as a backup. In 1961, he played in 8 games as a backup, before being traded to the Washington Redskins in exchange for offensive tackle Bob Whitlow on November 9.

=== Washington Redskins (first stint) ===
In 1961, he played right cornerback in 6 games with 4 starts, while also returning kickoffs and punts. In 1962, he was moved to left cornerback, starting all 14 games, while making 4 interceptions and 3 fumble recoveries.

In 1963, he was switched to strong safety, starting 13 games and had 5 interceptions. On September 29, in a game against the Dallas Cowboys, he made 3 interceptions, returning one for a franchise record 78-yard touchdown. He also was recognized as one of the best tacklers in the league.

In 1964, he was switched to strong safety, registering 144 tackles, 4 interceptions and one fumble recovery. In 1965, he started 14 games and had 4 interceptions.

In 1966, he suffered a punctured lung, a separated clavicle and 3 broken ribs in the first half of the preseason game against the Baltimore Colts. The injuries forced him to miss 6 weeks. On August 30, he was traded along with a fifth round pick (#119-Willie Parker) to the Cowboys, in exchange for Brig Owens, Jake Kupp, and Mitch Johnson.

=== Dallas Cowboys ===
In 1966, he couldn't play because of his previous injuries and was placed on the taxi squad. In 1967, he was re-signed by the Cowboys. He was converted into a weakside linebacker until suffering a right knee injury during training camp. He was released on August 25.

=== Washington Redskins (second stint) ===
On July 12, 1968, he was signed by the Washington Redskins. He was a backup linebacker behind Chris Hanburger, until suffering a broken arm in a preseason game. He was released on July 30.
