= Skip Stahley =

American football coach and director (1908–1992)

Biographical details
- Born: September 22, 1908; Lebanon, Pennsylvania, U.S.
- Died: June 27, 1992 (aged 83); Portland, Oregon, U.S.
- Education: Columbia University

Playing career
- 1928–1930: Penn State
- Position: Back

Coaching career (HC unless noted)
- 1931–1933: Western Maryland (assistant)
- 1934: Delaware
- 1935–1940: Harvard (backfield)
- 1941–1943: Brown
- 1944–1945: San Diego NTS
- 1946–1947: George Washington
- 1948–1949: Toledo
- 1950–1952: Washington (backfield)
- 1953: Chicago Cardinals (backfield)
- 1954–1961: Idaho

Administrative career (AD unless noted)
- 1960–1964: Idaho
- 1964–1972: Portland State

Head coaching record
- Overall: 64–90–4
- Bowls: 1–1
- Military career
- Allegiance: United States
- Branch: United States Navy
- Service years: 1944–1946
- Unit: Training
- Conflicts: World War II

Jacob Neil "Skip" Stahley (September 22, 1908 – June 27, 1992) was an American college football coach and athletic director. He served as the head coach at the University of Delaware in 1934, Brown University from 1941 to 1943, George Washington University from 1946 to 1947, the University of Toledo from 1948 to 1949, and the University of Idaho from 1954 to 1961. Stahley was the athletic director at Idaho from 1960 to 1964 and Portland State University from 1964 to 1972.

== Early years ==
Born in Lebanon, Pennsylvania, Stahley was an outstanding athlete at Lebanon High School and graduated in 1926. He attended Penn State in State College, where he majored in English and played football, earning honorable mention All-American honors. A three-sport letterman, Stahley also captained the basketball and lacrosse teams for the Nittany Lions. He graduated in 1931 and later earned a master's degree from Columbia University.

== Early coaching career ==
Stahley began his coaching career in 1931 as an assistant at Western Maryland College in Westminster under head coach Dick Harlow. In 1934, he became the head coach at the University of Delaware, and compiled a 4–3–1 record in Newark, then moved north to the Boston area and was an assistant coach at Harvard University, also under Harlow. From 1941 to 1943, Stahley was the head coach at Brown University in Providence, Rhode Island, with a 14–11 (.560) record.

Stahley served in the U.S. Navy in San Diego during World War II, and then coached in Washington, D.C. at George Washington University, with a 5–10–1 record in 1946 and 1947. He briefly returned to the West Coast in March 1948 as the backfield coach at the University of Washington in Seattle under new head coach Howie Odell. After two months, Stahley left for the Midwest to become the head coach at Toledo, and compiled an 11–10 record in two seasons.

Stahley returned to Seattle in 1950 as backfield coach at Washington for three seasons under Odell, where he mentored notable Huskies Hugh McElhenny and Don Heinrich. Odell was pressured to resign by the athletic director after a 7–3 season in 1952 and was replaced by John Cherberg, the coach of the freshman team.

== NFL ==
Stahley left the Huskies to coach in the National Football League (NFL) as the backfield coach with the Chicago Cardinals under head coach Joe Stydahar. The Cardinals ended 1953 with a win in the final game to finish at 1–10–1 (.125), the worst record in the twelve-team league.

== Idaho ==
Stahley quickly returned to college football in February 1954 as the head coach at Idaho at an annual salary of $9,000. The Vandals had finished the 1953 season at 1–8 under third-year head coach Babe Curfman.

Stahley compiled a 22–51–1 (.304) record in eight seasons in Moscow. While on the Palouse, he coached future NFL notables Jerry Kramer, Wayne Walker, Jim Prestel, and AFL all-star Jim Norton. The Vandals were members of the Pacific Coast Conference for Stahley's first five seasons, then played as an independent when the conference disbanded. Idaho's only conference victory under Stahley came in his first season: the winless Vandals (0–5) surprised and shut out neighbor Washington State 10–0 in Pullman in the Battle of the Palouse in 1954. It was Idaho's first victory in football over the Cougars in 29 years, and the subsequent eight-mile (13 km) march by WSC students from Pullman to Moscow was featured in Life magazine: The win started a four-game winning streak, Idaho's longest in 31 years, to finish at 4–5 for the 1954 season. That win at Rogers Field in his first attempt turned out to be Stahley's only triumph over the Cougars; the Vandals waited a full decade before the next.

When Idaho athletic director Bob Gibb left in 1960, Stahley took over those duties in July for four years. He handled both jobs for a year and a half, then stepped down under pressure as football coach in January 1962. The following month, he hired Dee Andros, an assistant coach at Illinois and a former guard under Bud Wilkinson at Oklahoma. As AD, Stahley was a driving force in the creation of the Big Sky Conference, which was formed in February 1963.

After a decade in Moscow, Stahley resigned as Idaho's athletic director in 1964 to become the first full-time director of athletics at Portland State College (now PSU), where he served until late 1971. Following the 1964 football season, Andros left after three years for Oregon State in Corvallis to succeed Tommy Prothro, who left the Rose Bowl team for UCLA.

Stahley's eight consecutive seasons as head coach of Idaho football was the most in program history until 2021; as a result, he led the Vandals in losses with 51 until October 2019, when passed by seventh-year head coach Paul Petrino.

=== U.S. patent ===
Prior to his last season as head coach, Stahley was granted a US patent 2967709 for an early defensive reaction machine, issued on January 10, 1961. The "Athletic Training Apparatus" was conceived to improve the reactions of defensive linemen at the line of scrimmage.

== Halls of fame ==
Stahley is a member of the Idaho Sports Hall of Fame, the Western Pennsylvania Hall of Fame, and the National Association of Collegiate athletic directors Hall of Fame.

== Personal ==
Stahley married Mrs. Shirley Sherman Kime (c.1910–1993) in Toledo on July 1, 1950. They had two daughters, and she had two sons from a previous marriage. Following retirement from PSU in 1972, Stahley and his wife continued to reside in Portland for the next two decades; he died in 1992 at the age of 83, and she died the following year.

=== Crime fighter ===
While an assistant coach in 1938, The Harvard Crimson newspaper reported that Stahley knocked out a suspected burglar with a single punch. In the early hours of a winter morning in Somerville, Massachusetts, the perpetrator was halfway through a second floor apartment window when he was discovered by its female occupant, and she let out an audible warning. Stahley also lived in the building, and he and a couple of companions were outside at the base of the fire escape to encounter him.

== Head coaching record ==
Year	Team	Overall	Conference	Standing	Bowl/playoffs
Delaware Fightin' Blue Hens (Independent) (1934)
1934	Delaware	4–3–1			
Delaware:		4–3–1			
Brown Bears (Independent) (1941–1943)
1941	Brown	5–4			
1942	Brown	4–4			
1943	Brown	5–3			
Brown:		14–11			
San Diego Naval Training Station Bluejackets (Independent) (1944)
1944	San Diego NTS	4–3–1			
1945	San Diego NTS	4–2			
San Diego NTS:		8–5–1			
George Washington Colonials (Southern Conference) (1946–1947)
1946	George Washington	4–3	1–1	9th	
1947	George Washington	1–7–1	0–4	16th	
George Washington:		5–10–1	1–5		
Toledo Rockets (Independent) (1948–1949)
1948	Toledo	5–6			W Glass
1949	Toledo	6–4			L Glass
Toledo:		11–10			
Idaho Vandals (Pacific Coast Conference) (1954–1958)
1954	Idaho	4–5	1–2	7th	
1955	Idaho	2–7	0–4	9th	
1956	Idaho	4–5	0–4	9th	
1957	Idaho	4–4–1	0–3	9th	
1958	Idaho	4–5	0–3	9th	
Idaho Vandals (Independent) (1959–1961)
1959	Idaho	1–9			
1960	Idaho	1–9			
1961	Idaho	2–7			
Idaho:		22–51–1	1–16		
Total:		64–90–4			
