= Jim Matheny =

American gridiron football player (born 1936)

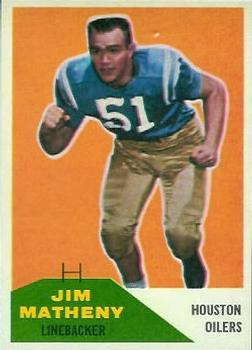
- 1960 Fleer trading card

No. 43, 52
- Position: Centre

Personal information
- Born: February 16, 1936 (age 90); Long Beach, California, U.S.
- Listed height: 6 ft 1 in (1.85 m)
- Listed weight: 228 lb (103 kg)

Career information
- High school: Pasadena (Pasadena, California)
- College: UCLA
- NFL draft: 1958: 20th round, 231st overall pick

Career history
- 1957: Toronto Argonauts
- 1958–1959: Chicago Cardinals*
- 1960: Houston Oilers*
- * Offseason or practice squad member only

Awards and highlights
- Second-team All-American (1956); First-team All-PCC (1956)

James Charles Matheny (born February 16, 1936) is an American former professional football center who played one season with the Toronto Argonauts of the Interprovincial Rugby Football Union (IRFU). He was selected by the Chicago Cardinals in the 20th round of the 1958 NFL draft. He played college football at the University of California, Los Angeles. Matheny was also a member of the Houston Oilers of the American Football League (AFL).

== Early life ==
James Charles Matheny was born on February 16, 1936, in Long Beach, California. He attended Pasadena High School in Pasadena, California.

== College career ==
Matheny played college football for the UCLA Bruins. He was on the freshman team in 1954 and a two-year letterman from 1955 to 1956. He averaged over 45 minutes a game his senior year in 1956, earning Associated Press and United Press first-team All-Pacific Coast honors as well as being named Most Valuable Player by his teammates. Matheny was also named a second-team All-American by the International News Service for his performance during the 1956 season.

== Professional career ==
Matheny played in 12 games for the Toronto Argonauts in 1957.

Matheny was selected by the Chicago Cardinals in the 20th round, with the 231st overall pick, of the 1958 NFL draft. He signed with the Cardinals in 1958 but was released later that year. He signed with the Cardinals again in 1959 but was also released.

Matheny signed with the Houston Oilers of the American Football League on February 1, 1960. He was released on July 22, 1960, after leaving the team.
