= 1957 Oregon State Beavers football team =

American college football season

1957 Oregon State Beavers football

PCC co-champion
- Conference: Pacific Coast Conference
- Record: 8–2 (6–2 PCC)
- Head coach: Tommy Prothro (2nd season)
- Captain: Ted Searle
- Home stadium: Parker Stadium; Multnomah Stadium

1957 Pacific Coast Conference football standings
	Conf.					Overall
Team	W		L		T	W		L		T
Oregon State +	6	–	2	–	0	8	–	2	–	0
No. 17 Oregon ^ +	6	–	2	–	0	7	–	4	–	0
No. 19 UCLA	5	–	2	–	0	8	–	2	–	0
Washington State	5	–	3	–	0	6	–	4	–	0
Stanford	4	–	3	–	0	6	–	4	–	0
Washington	3	–	4	–	0	3	–	6	–	1
California	1	–	6	–	0	1	–	9	–	0
USC	1	–	6	–	0	1	–	9	–	0
Idaho	0	–	3	–	0	4	–	4	–	1
+ – Conference co-champions; ^ – Selected as Rose Bowl representative Oregon State won the rivalry game over Oregon, but PCC no-repeat rule was in effect; Rankings from Coaches Poll

The 1957 Oregon State Beavers football team represented Oregon State College in the 1957 college football season. Led by third-year head coach Tommy Prothro, the Beavers went 8–2, and outscored their opponents 203 to 129. Oregon State won their second consecutive Pacific Coast Conference championship, the only time the Beavers have won consecutive conference championships. The team captain was Ted Searle.

Oregon State became the second and last PCC team to be adversely affected by the "no-repeat" rule for the Rose Bowl. Unranked rival Oregon, which had lost to the Beavers, went instead. Three years earlier, undefeated UCLA had to stay home, too. Implemented after California lost a third straight Rose Bowl in January 1951, the rule was thrown out for West Coast teams when the PCC disbanded in 1959, but the Big Ten retained theirs from the late 1940s until the early 1970s.

== Schedule ==
Date	Opponent	Rank	Site	Result	Attendance	Source
September 21	No. 19 USC	No. 13	Multnomah Stadium; Portland, OR	W 20–0	36,885	
September 28	at Kansas*	No. 9	Memorial Stadium; Lawrence, KS	W 34–6	28,000	
October 5	at Northwestern*	No. 9	Dyche Stadium; Evanston, IL	W 22–13	34,500	
October 12	Idaho	No. 7	Parker Stadium; Corvallis, OR	W 20–0	14,600	
October 19	at UCLA	No. 7	Los Angeles Memorial Coliseum; Los Angeles, CA	L 7–26	46,102	
October 26	at Washington		Husky Stadium; Seattle, WA	L 6–19	29,000	
November 2	Washington State		Parker Stadium; Corvallis, OR	W 39–25	20,200	
November 9	at California		California Memorial Stadium; Berkeley, CA	W 21–19	50,000	
November 16	Stanford		Parker Stadium; Corvallis, OR	W 24–14	20,000	
November 23	at No. 15 Oregon		Hayward Field; Eugene, OR (Civil War)	W 10–7	23,150	
*Non-conference game; Rankings from AP Poll released prior to the game; Source:

== NFL draft ==
Player	Position	Round	Pick	NFL club
Joe Francis	Quarterback	5	51	Green Bay Packers
