= 1958 All-Pacific Coast football team =

American all-star college football team

The 1958 All-Pacific Coast football team consists of American football players chosen by various organizations for All-Pacific Coast teams for the 1958 college football season.

== Selections ==
=== Quarterbacks ===
- Joe Kapp, California (AP-1; Coaches-1)
- Bob Newman, Washington State (Coaches-2)
- John Hangartner, Arizona State (AP-2)

=== Halfbacks ===
- Jack Hart, California (AP-1; Coaches-1)
- Willie West, Oregon (AP-2; Coaches-1)
- Don Buford, USC (Coaches-2)
- Ray Smith, UCLA (Coaches-2)

=== Fullbacks ===
- Charles "Chuck" Morrell, Washington State (AP-1; Coaches-1)
- Nub Beamer, Oregon State (AP-2; Coaches-2)
- Sam Dawson, San Jose State (AP-2)

=== Ends ===
- Chris Burford, Stanford (AP-1; Coaches-1)
- Marlin McKeever, USC (AP-1; Coaches-1)
- Dick Bass, College of the Pacific (AP-1)
- Jim Steffen, UCLA (AP-2; Coaches-2)
- Bill Steiger, Washington State (AP-2; Coaches-2)

=== Tackles ===
- Ted Bates, Oregon State (AP-1; Coaches-1)
- Bill Leeka, UCLA (Coaches-1)
- Dan Ficca, USC (AP-1; Coaches-2)
- Troy Barbee, Stanford (Coaches-2 [tie])
- Jim Linden, Oregon (Coaches-2 [tie])
- Kurt Gegner, Washington (AP-2)
- Pete Johnson, Idaho (AP-2)

=== Guards ===
- Jim Brackins, Oregon State (AP-1; Coaches-1)
- Bob Grottkau, Oregon (AP-1; Coaches-1 [tie])
- Frank Fiorentino, USC (Coaches-1 [tie])
- Pete Domoto, California (AP-2; Coaches-2)
- Don Armstrong, Washington (Coaches-2)
- Sonny Sanchez, Oregon State (AP-2)

=== Centers ===
- Bob Peterson, Oregon (AP-2; Coaches-1)
- Terry Jones, California (Coaches-2 [tie])
- Marv Nelson, Washington State (AP-1; Coaches-2 [tie])

== Key ==
AP = Associated Press, selections made by the AP with assistance from boards of newspapermen and broadcasters along the coast

Coaches = selected by the conference coaches

Bold = Consensus first-team selection of both the AP and conference coaches

== See also ==
- 1958 College Football All-America Team
