= Jack Crabtree (American football) =

American football player (1935–2026)

No. 17
- Position: Quarterback

Personal information
- Born: November 19, 1935; Fort Smith, Arkansas, U.S.
- Died: March 16, 2026 (aged 90); Eugene, Oregon, U.S.
- Listed height: 6 ft 0 in (1.83 m)

Career information
- College: Oregon
- NFL draft: 1958: 12 / 136th round

Career history
- 1958: Philadelphia Eagles
- 1960: Denver Broncos (AFL)
- 1960: Los Angeles Chargers (AFL)

Awards and highlights
- Rose Bowl MVP (1958)

Jack Crabtree (November 19, 1935 – March 16, 2026) was an American college football player who was a quarterback for the Oregon Ducks. He was the most valuable player of the 1958 Rose Bowl; despite that, his team lost the game.

== Early life ==
Crabtree grew up in Lakewood, California, and attended Excelsior High School in nearby Norwalk where he starred at quarterback. He attended San Bernardino Junior College before attending the University of Oregon and became the starting quarterback for the Oregon Ducks football team in his senior season of 1957.

== Rose Bowl ==
In 1957, Crabtree led the Ducks to a tie for the Pacific Coast Conference championship with Oregon State. Since Oregon State had gone to the Rose Bowl the previous year, the unranked Ducks earned a berth in the 1958 Rose Bowl against heavily favored and top-ranked Ohio State. In the game, Crabtree completed 10 of 17 passes for 135 yards—huge numbers for those days—and the Ducks nearly pulled off a major upset, tying the game 7–7 in the second quarter and holding the score until the fourth quarter when a Buckeye field goal put Ohio State ahead for good, 10–7.

For his heroics in a losing effort, Crabtree was named Rose Bowl MVP, one of only two players from a losing Rose Bowl team to win the award outright. Crabtree was named to the Rose Bowl Hall of Fame in 1998.

== Professional career and retirement ==
Crabtree was selected in the 12th round of the 1958 NFL draft by the Philadelphia Eagles before spending two years in the United States Army. In 1960, he played briefly with the Denver Broncos and Los Angeles Chargers of the American Football League. Following his retirement from football, he worked for the Champion sportswear company, becoming manager of its west coast sales force. He resided in Portland, Oregon at the time of his death in 2026.

== Later life and death ==
Crabtree was named to the Oregon Sports Hall of Fame in 1981 and the University of Oregon Athletic Hall of Fame in 2002.

Crabtree died on March 16, 2026, at the age of 90.
