= Galen Laack =

American football player (1931–1958)

No. 52, 64
- Position: Guard

Personal information
- Born: April 3, 1931; Abbotsford, Wisconsin, U.S.
- Died: December 31, 1958 (aged 27); Livermore, California, U.S.
- Listed height: 6 ft 0 in (1.83 m)
- Listed weight: 230 lb (104 kg)

Career information
- High school: Abbotsford
- College: Pacific (1953–1956)
- NFL draft: 1957: 9th round, 105th overall pick

Career history
- Saskatchewan Roughriders (1957); Washington Redskins (1958)*; Philadelphia Eagles (1958)
- * Offseason or practice squad member only

Awards and highlights
- First-team All-PCC (1956)

Career NFL statistics
- Games played: 8
- Games started: 1
- Stats at Pro Football Reference

Galen William Laack (April 3, 1931 – December 31, 1958) was an American professional football guard in the National Football League (NFL) for the Philadelphia Eagles. He played college football at the University of the Pacific and was drafted in the ninth round of the 1957 NFL draft by the Washington Redskins. He died on New Year's Eve in 1958 when his car would not turn and hit a tree.

== See also ==
- List of gridiron football players who died during their careers
