= Bob Grottkau =

American football player (born 1937)

No. 60, 64
- Position: Guard

Personal information
- Born: March 22, 1937; San Rafael, California, U.S.
- Died: June 18, 2024; Spokane, Washington, U.S.
- Listed height: 6 ft 4 in (1.93 m)
- Listed weight: 228 lb (103 kg)

Career information
- High school: Oakland (Oakland, California)
- College: Oregon
- NFL draft: 1959: 4th round, 46th overall pick

Career history
- Detroit Lions (1959–1960); Dallas Cowboys (1961)

Awards and highlights
- First-team All-PCC (1958)

Career NFL statistics
- Games played: 30
- Stats at Pro Football Reference

Robert Fred Grottkau (born March 22, 1937) is an American former professional football player who was a guard in the National Football League (NFL) for the Detroit Lions and Dallas Cowboys. He played college football for the Oregon Ducks and was selected by the Lions in the fourth round of the 1959 NFL draft.

== Early life ==
Grottkau attended Oakland High School where he played as a fullback. He accepted a scholarship from the University of Oregon. As a sophomore, he was switched to offensive tackle. The next year, he was moved to guard out of necessity and became a two-year starter.

== Professional career ==
=== Detroit Lions ===
He was selected by the Detroit Lions in the fourth round (46th overall) of the 1959 NFL draft. In 1960, he played in five games.

On August 21, 1961, he was traded along with rookie Houston Entwine to the Dallas Cowboys in exchange for offensive lineman John Gonzaga.

=== Dallas Cowboys ===
In 1961, he was a reserve player. On July 31, 1962, he was waived after being unable to overcome a knee injury.

== Personal life ==
Grottkau was the offensive line coach at San Jose State University for two years. In 1971, he was named the offensive coordinator and line coach for the University of Iowa.
