= Pete Pifer =

American football player (born 1944)

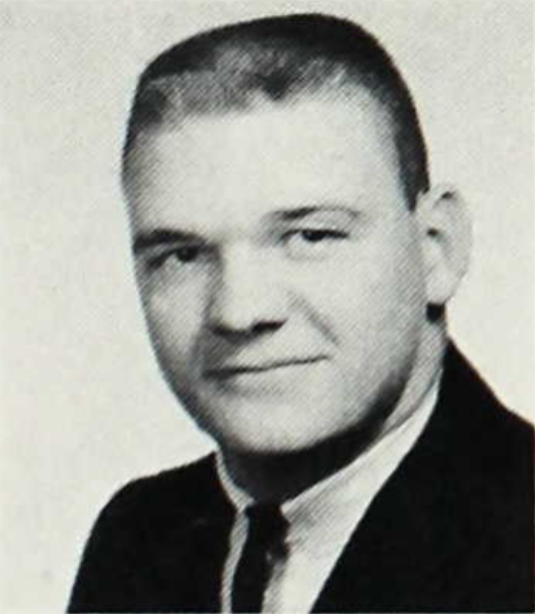
- Peter Pifer from the 1964 Beaver

Profile
- Position: Fullback

Personal information
- Born: December 10, 1944 (age 81); Ridgecrest, California, U.S.
- Listed height: 5 ft 10 in (1.78 m)
- Listed weight: 220 lb (100 kg)

Career information
- High school: Sherman E. Burroughs (CA)
- College: Oregon State (1964–1966)

Awards and highlights
- Second-team All-American (1966); W. J. Voit Memorial Trophy (1966); Pop Warner Trophy (1966); 2× First-team All-Pac-8 (1965); Oregon State Athletics Hall of Fame (1990); Oregon Sports Hall of Fame (1991)

Pete Pifer (born December 10, 1944) is an American former football fullback who played who played for Oregon State from 1964 to 1966. He was the first player in Pacific Athletic Conference history to rush for 1,000 yards twice and won both the W. J. Voit Memorial Trophy and the Pop Warner Trophy in 1966.

== Early life ==
Pifer grew up in Ridgecrest, California, and played football at Sherman E. Burroughs High School.

== Oregon State ==
Pifer enrolled at Oregon State University and played for the freshman football team in 1963.

As a junior in 1965, Pifer rushed for 1,095 yards and six touchdowns. His single-game totals included 131 yards against both Washington and Utah and 126 yards against USC. His 1,095 rushing yards was an Oregon State single-season record, and ranked fifth nationally among major college football players. He was selected as the first-team fullback on the 1965 PAC All-Conference football team. He was also selected as the most valuable player on the 1965 Oregon State Beavers football team.

As a senior in 1966, he rushed for 1,088 yards and 12 touchdowns. He led the Pac-8 Conference in both rushing yards (1,088) and scoring (72 points). He was also the first player in Pacific Coast Conference history to rush for 1,000 yards twice. At the end of the 1966 season, he received the W. J. Voit Memorial Trophy, edging Mel Farr and Gary Beban as the outstanding college football player on the Pacific Coast. He also won the Pop Warner Trophy for 1966. He was also selected as Oregon State's most valuable player for the second consecutive season, finishing his career as Oregon State's all-time career rushing leader with 2,233 yards. Oregon State coach Dee Andros called him "the best football player I've ever coached."

== Later life ==
Pifer was drafted by the New York Giants in the 11th round of the 1967 NFL Draft. He played during the 1967 season for the Westchester Bulls of the Atlantic Coast Football League. After retiring from football, Pifer owned a McDonald's franchise in Morgantown, West Virginia, and later a restaurant in Springfield, Oregon.

In 1990, he was inducted into the Oregon State Athletics Hall of Fame. He was also inducted into the Oregon Sports Hall of Fame in 1991.
