= Nub Beamer =

American gridiron football player (born 1936)

Clarence (Nub) Beamer
Profile
- Position: Fullback

Personal information
- Born: February 14, 1936; Fort Scott, Kansas, U.S.
- Died: September 10, 2024 (aged 88); Kelowna, B.C., Canada
- Listed height: 5 ft 11 in (1.80 m)
- Listed weight: 210 lb (95 kg)

Career information
- College: Oregon State

Career history
- 1959–1963: BC Lions

Awards and highlights
- Eddie James Memorial Trophy (1962); 2× CFL West All-Star (1962, 1963); 2× Second-team All-PCC (1957, 1958)

Clarence Marvin "Nub" Beamer Jr. (February 14, 1936 - September 10, 2024) was an all-star Canadian Football League (CFL) fullback in the 1960s.

== High school ==
Beamer as a senior became the first football player at Roseburg High (Roseburg, OR) to receive first-team all-state honours.

== College ==
Beamer accepted a scholarship offer from Oregon State University and spent the next four years in Corvallis. He played a major role on the 1956,1957 and 1958 Beaver teams. He played in the 1957 Rose Bowl loss to the Iowa Hawkeyes, scoring a touchdown.

== Professional ==
He moved north to Canada in 1959, playing with the BC Lions. He was a bruising fullback, and was an all-star twice, in 1962 when he rushed for 1161 yards (only the second Leo, after Willie Fleming to do so), and in 1963 (914 yards) when he played in their Grey Cup loss. He rushed for 3662 yards in his career. A pair of concussions in 1963 forced Beamer to retire and become a stockbroker.

Beamer died in Kelowna, B.C on September 10, 2024, aged 88 years.
