= 1957 Oregon Ducks football team =

American college football season

1957 Oregon Ducks football

PCC co-champion

Rose Bowl, L 7–10 vs. Ohio State
- Conference: Pacific Coast Conference

Ranking
- Coaches: No. 17
- Record: 7–4 (6–2 PCC)
- Head coach: Len Casanova (7th season)
- Captains: Jim Shanley; Jack Morris; Norm Chapman; Harry Mondale
- Home stadium: Hayward Field, Multnomah Stadium

1957 Pacific Coast Conference football standings
	Conf.					Overall
Team	W		L		T	W		L		T
Oregon State +	6	–	2	–	0	8	–	2	–	0
No. 17 Oregon ^ +	6	–	2	–	0	7	–	4	–	0
No. 19 UCLA	5	–	2	–	0	8	–	2	–	0
Washington State	5	–	3	–	0	6	–	4	–	0
Stanford	4	–	3	–	0	6	–	4	–	0
Washington	3	–	4	–	0	3	–	6	–	1
California	1	–	6	–	0	1	–	9	–	0
USC	1	–	6	–	0	1	–	9	–	0
Idaho	0	–	3	–	0	4	–	4	–	1
+ – Conference co-champions; ^ – Selected as Rose Bowl representative Oregon State won the rivalry game over Oregon, but PCC no-repeat rule was in effect; Rankings from Coaches Poll

The 1957 Oregon Ducks represented the University of Oregon in the Pacific Coast Conference (PCC) during the 1957 college football season. Three home games were played on campus in Eugene at Hayward Field and three at Multnomah Stadium in Portland.

Led by seventh-year head coach Len Casanova, the Ducks were 7–3 in the regular season and 6–2 in the PCC, co-champions with rival Oregon State. Although the Beavers won the Civil War game in Eugene, the PCC had a no-repeat rule for the Rose Bowl, so the Ducks had clinched the berth the previous week with a win in Los Angeles over struggling USC.

In the Rose Bowl on New Year's Day, Oregon met Big Ten champion Ohio State (8–1), second-ranked and led by head coach Woody Hayes. The Buckeyes were ranked first in the UPI coaches poll and heavily favored, by up to twenty points, but needed a fourth quarter field goal to break a tie for a 10–7 win.

Outside the 27–26 win at Stanford, the Ducks did not allow more than thirteen points in their ten other games, which included two shutouts, and finished at 7–4.

== Schedule ==
Date	Opponent	Rank	Site	Result	Attendance	Source
September 21	at Idaho		Neale Stadium; Moscow, ID	W 9–6	10,000	
September 28	No. 16 Pittsburgh*		Multnomah Stadium; Portland, OR	L 3–6	20,486	
October 5	No. 19 UCLA		Multnomah Stadium; Portland, OR	W 21–0	16,332	
October 12	San Jose State*		Hayward Field; Eugene, OR	W 26–0	10,300	
October 19	at No. 19 Washington State		Rogers Field; Pullman, WA	W 14–13	19,000	
October 26	California	No. 18	Hayward Field; Eugene, OR	W 24–6	18,321	
November 2	at Stanford	No. 15	Stanford Stadium; Stanford, CA	W 27–26	56,000	
November 9	Washington	No. 13	Multnomah Stadium; Portland, OR (rivalry)	L 6–13	30,010	
November 16	at USC	No. 16	Los Angeles Memorial Coliseum; Los Angeles, CA	W 16–7	30,975	
November 23	Oregon State	No. 15	Hayward Field; Eugene, OR (Civil War)	L 7–10	23,150	
January 1, 1958	vs. No. 2 Ohio State		Rose Bowl; Pasadena, CA (Rose Bowl)	L 7–10	98,202	
*Non-conference game; Rankings from AP Poll released prior to the game
