= Bill Leeka =

American football player (born 1938)

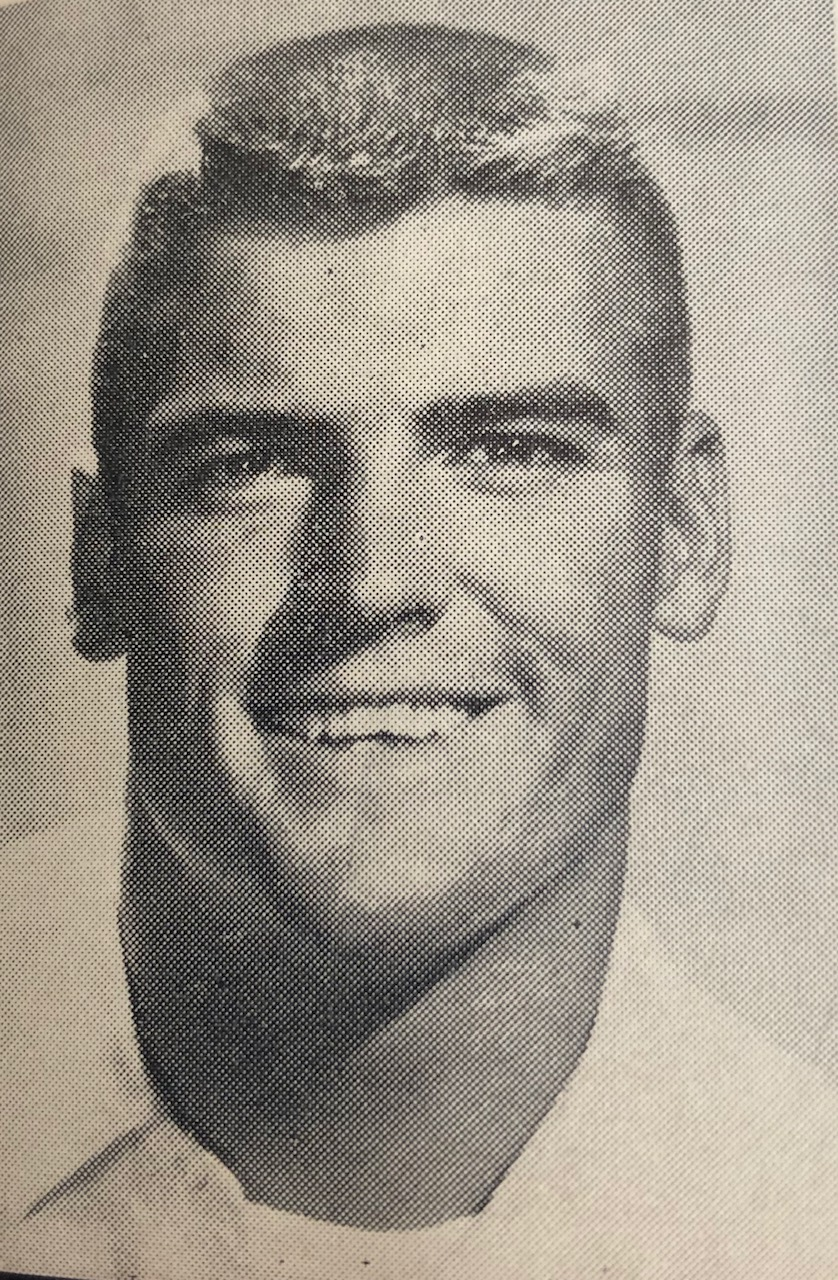
- Leeka, c. 1958

Profile
- Position: Tackle

Personal information
- Born: January 18, 1938 (age 88); Los Angeles, California, U.S.

Career information
- College: University of California, Los Angeles (1956–1958)

Awards and highlights
- First-team All-American (1958); Second-team All-American (1957); 2× First-team All-PCC (1957, 1958)

William Francis Leeka (born January 18, 1938) is an American former football player.

Leeka was born in 1938 in Los Angeles County, California, and attended Alhambra High School.

He played college football at the tackle position for the UCLA Bruins football team from 1956 to 1958. He was selected by Time magazine as a first-team end on its 1958 All-America college football team. He also received All-Pacific Coast Conference (PCC) honors in both 1957 and 1958. He only played a half season in 1958 due to PCC penalties.

He played professional football in 1965 and 1966 for the Hartford Charter Oaks of the Continental Football League.
