= Bob Newman =

American football player (1936–2022)

Robert Donald Newman
Profile
- Position: Quarterback

Personal information
- Born: 14 October 1936
- Died: 9 November 2022 (aged 86); Eugene, Oregon, U.S.

Career information
- College: Washington State (1957)

Awards and highlights
- Second-team All-American (1957); NCAA passing and total offense leader (1957); First-team All-PCC (1957); 2× Second-team All-PCC (1956, 1958)

Robert Donald Newman (October 14, 1936-November 9, 2022) was an American football player. He played college football for Washington State Cougars football team from 1956 to 1958 and was a 2nd round draft pick by the San Francisco 49ers in 1958.

Newman was born and raised in the California Bay area. He was highly recruited coming out of high school and chose to go to Washington State.

At WSU, Newman played quarterback, defensive back, punter and placekicker. He had school recording setting seasons in 1956 and 1957. In 1956, he ranked second behind John Brodie among NCAA major college players with 1,240 passing yards and led the nation in total offense.

In 10 games during the 1957 season, he completed 104 of 188 passes for 1,391 passing yards and 13 touchdowns, and he also compiled 1,444 yards of total offense. He again led the NCAA major colleges that year in total offense and passing efficiency and ranked second in passing yards. He also led the Pacific Coast Conference in 1957 in pass completions (104), pass completion percentage (55.3%), and passing touchdowns (13). Newman was unanimously selected as a first-team player on the Associated Press' 1957 All-Pacific Coast Conference football team and was named to the All-West Coast team by the AP. That season he also played in the East/West Shrine game. In 1958, he also played baseball for WSU.

Newman was drafted 22nd overall in the second round by the San Francisco 49ers in 1958. He chose to return to Washington State for his final season. He suffered an injury that season that cut hit playing and prevented him from making the 49ers roster in 1959. In September 1960, he signed with the Oakland Raiders but never played in the NFL.

When his football career was over, he went to work for Sears Roebuck & Company where he was employed for more than 30 years. He worked numerous jobs for the company before becoming store manager in Eugene, OR in 1977 where he stayed until his retirement in 1992. He and his wife retired to Creswell, OR.

He was inducted into the Washington State Hall of Fame in 2011.

== See also ==
- List of NCAA major college football yearly passing leaders
- List of NCAA major college football yearly total offense leaders
