= Bill Steiger (American football) =

American football player

No. 86
- Positions: End, halfback

Personal information
- Born: November 25, 1935; Missoula, Montana, U.S.

Career information
- College: Washington State (1955–1956, 1958)

Awards and highlights
- First-team All-American (1956); First-team All-PCC (1956); Second-team All-PCC (1958)

William Herbert Steiger (born November 25, 1935) is an American former college football player. He was born in Missoula, Montana, grew up in Olympia, Washington, and attended Washington State University. He played at the end and halfback positions in 1955, 1956, and 1958 for the Washington State Cougars football team. As a junior in 1956, he was the second leading receiver in the country in 1956 with 39 catches for 609 yards. He was selected by the Football Writers Association of America (FWAA) as a first-team player on its 1956 All-America college football team, and received second-team honors from the Associated Press. In June 1957, he was paralyzed when he dived into a swimming pool in Walnut Creek, California. He underwent surgery and regained his mobility. He missed the 1957 football season but returned to play for Washington State in 1958. In January 1959, and following his successful 1958 comeback, Steiger received the J. Fred Bohler award as the most inspirational Washington State player of 1958.
