= Wayne Walker (linebacker) =

American football player and sports broadcaster (1936–2017)

No. 55
- Positions: Linebacker, placekicker

Personal information
- Born: September 30, 1936; Boise, Idaho, U.S.
- Died: May 19, 2017 (aged 80); Boise, Idaho, U.S.
- Listed height: 6 ft 2 in (1.88 m)
- Listed weight: 225 lb (102 kg)

Career information
- High school: Boise
- College: Idaho (1955–1957)
- NFL draft: 1958: 4th round, 45th overall pick

Career history
- Detroit Lions (1958–1972)

Awards and highlights
- First-team All-Pro (1965); 3× Second-team All-Pro (1963, 1964, 1966); 3× Pro Bowl (1963–1965); Detroit Lions 75th Anniversary Team; Second-team All-PCC (1957); Idaho Vandals No. 53 retired

Career NFL statistics
- Sacks: 38.5
- Fumble recoveries: 15
- Interceptions: 14
- Safeties: 1
- Defensive touchdowns: 2
- Field goals attempted: 131
- Field goals made: 53
- Points scored: 345
- Stats at Pro Football Reference

Wayne Harrison Walker (September 30, 1936 – May 19, 2017) was an American professional football player and sports broadcaster. He played 15 seasons with the Detroit Lions of the National Football League (NFL), as a linebacker and placekicker. Walker played in 200 regular season games, the second most for a defensive player at the time. He played in three Pro Bowls and was once selected as a first-team All-NFL player. After the 1972 season, he retired as a player and was a sports broadcaster for CBS and the sports director for KPIX-TV in San Francisco from 1974 to 1994. Walker was a weekend sportscaster during the off-season during his later years as a Detroit Lion.

== Early life ==
Born and raised in Boise, Idaho, Walker graduated from Boise High School in 1954. As a teen, he played American Legion baseball against Baseball Hall of Famer Harmon Killebrew of Payette; Walker passed on an offer to play minor league baseball to attend college.

== College career ==
Walker played college football at the University of Idaho in Moscow, then a member of the Pacific Coast Conference, as a center and middle linebacker for the Vandals under head coach Skip Stahley. Walker's teammate (and road roommate) at Idaho was Hall of Famer Jerry Kramer of Sandpoint; both went on to lengthy careers in the NFL, and had their numbers retired at Idaho.

As a senior in 1957, Walker was a team captain and was selected by the United Press as a second-team center on the All-Pacific Coast team. In the East-West Shrine Game at San Francisco in late December, he played on both sides of the ball and had five tackles, three assists, two interceptions, and blocked a kick; he was voted the outstanding defensive player of the game. He also played in the College All-Star Game in mid-August 1958, helping the pro rookies defeat the Detroit Lions, his new team, 35–19.

On special teams at Idaho, Walker was the long snapper, as Kramer was the placekicker.

== Professional career ==
Walker was selected by the Detroit Lions in the fourth round of the 1958 NFL draft, 45th overall, in December 1957, weeks before Detroit won the NFL title, their third of the decade. He played for the Lions for 15 years from 1958 to 1972. Walker appeared in 200 games for the Lions, a franchise record that was later broken by placekicker Jason Hanson. He also scored 345 points, which ranked third in Lions history at the time of his retirement (currently ninth). As a placekicker, Walker converted 53 of 131 field goal attempts for a 40.5% success rate, the lowest field goal percentage in NFL history. He attempted 13 field goals of 50+ yards in his career, and missed them all. On extra points, he converted 172 of 175 attempts for a 98.3% success rate.

== Broadcasting career ==
After his retirement from the NFL, Walker was the sports director for KPIX-TV, the CBS affiliate in San Francisco, for 20 years, from 1974 to 1994, where he succeeded Barry Tompkins. He was also a sports commentator for the San Francisco 49ers' radio broadcasts for over 20 years, and a commentator on Oakland Athletics baseball broadcasts from 1976 to 1980 and in 1985. During the 1979 season, when the struggling A's lost 108 games, he teamed up with fellow southern Idahoan Harmon Killebrew. Walker was also a color commentator on regional NFL games for several years on CBS, working many games with Tom Brookshier, who moved from color commentary to play-by-play beginning in 1981.

== Later life ==
Walker and his wife Sylvia returned to the Boise area in 1994, and he began hosting Incredible Idaho, a half-hour outdoor show on Boise's NBC affiliate, KTVB-TV. In 1999, he retired from broadcasting. In December of that year, Walker was ninth on the Sports Illustrated list of greatest sports figures from Idaho.

Diagnosed with throat cancer in June 2007, Walker lost 60 pounds (27 kg) after chemotherapy and radiation treatment. As of 2009, he was healthy again and had regained most of the lost weight. In October 2015, Walker announced that he was suffering from Parkinson's disease, possibly as a result of the many concussions he suffered during his playing days. He died on May 19, 2017, from complications from Parkinson's disease.
