= Dick Wallen =

American football player

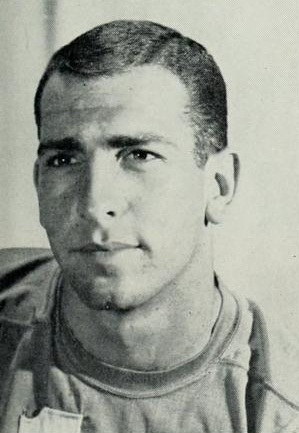
Wallen from 1957 UCLA yearbook

Richard “Dick” Wallen (born c. June 6, 1937) is a former American football player who was a consensus All-American at the end position in 1957 while playing for UCLA. He was awarded the 1957 W.J. Voit Memorial Trophy as the outstanding football player on the Pacific Coast. He was inducted into the UCLA Athletics Hall of Fame in 1996.

== Early years ==
A native of Alhambra, California, Wallen won 11 letters at Alhambra High School, including letters in football, tennis, track and basketball. He was also voted the prep Player of the Year in the Pacific League. Wallen enrolled at UCLA in 1955. He was converted by UCLA coach Red Sanders from a wingback to an end. Wallen was a three-year starter at the end position for UCLA in 1956, 1957, and 1958. As a sophomore, he caught 23 passes for 308 yards and two touchdowns.

== Consensus All-American in 1957 ==
Wallen's greatest success as a football player came in his junior year in 1957. That year, Wallen caught 20 passes for 303 yards. He was also a star on defense, intercepting four passes and recovering six opposition fumbles. Wallen led the UCLA team in minutes played, playing 399 minutes out of a possible 600. UCLA coach Sanders praised Wallen's skills:

"'Wallen's got the best hands I ever saw in college ball,' says Sanders, 'and that includes fellows like Don Hutson when he was at Alabama. He's a natural born receiver; you don't learn those finger-tip haul downs Dick makes. His hand aren't big either. But he just has an instinct for catching a football, plus intelligence, quick judgment and perfect balance. It's a joy to coach a kid like that because he's eager to learn and never makes the same mistake twice."

Opposing coaches also praised Wallen. Stanford's Coach Joe Ruetz said, "Dick Wallen is as fine a receiver as I've ever seen." After an October 1957 game against Washington, Los Angeles Times sports writer Dick Hyland called Wallen a "Giant on Defense," writing as follows:

"Wallen was much more than a pass receiver. True, he again jumped in the air and duplicated his Illinois game stunt of making an unbelievable one-handed catch of a ball thrown over his head. ... His big contributions, however, were on defense. Twice, acting with the quickness of a cat, the 175-pound Bruin junior backed away while rushing Washington Quarterback Al Ferguson and intercepted the latter's short lob passes aimed to go well over Wallen's head."

For his performance in 1957, Wallen received numerous awards, including first-team All-American designations from the Associated Press, American Football Coaches Association, Football Writers Association of America, Newspaper Editors Association, and Walter Camp Football Foundation. He was the only junior selected to the 1957 AP All-America Team. He also received the American Legion Trophy as UCLA's most valuable player, and the W.J. Voit Memorial Trophy, awarded each year by the Helms Athletic Foundation to the outstanding football player on the Pacific Coast. Wallen was only the second junior to receive the Voit Trophy and received 60 votes in the balloting, double the total of the second highest vote recipient.

== 1958 season ==
As a senior in 1958, Wallen's eligibility was limited to five games under Pacific Coast Conference rules. He had one of his finest games in an October 1958 loss to Florida. Wallen caught two touchdown passes (UCLA's only touchdowns) in his final home game, prompting Mal Florence to write the following:

"Florida won the ball game, but Bruin end Dick Wallen won the acclaim of everyone in the Coliseum who witnessed his spectacular pass-catching exhibition last night. Wallen, a five-game senior playing his final local game, was the talk of both dressing rooms. Bob Woodruff, whose Gators triumphed 21-14, said following the game, 'There's no pass defense against a great receiver like Wallen.'"

The restriction on Wallen's playing time as a senior caused him to fall short of breaking UCLA's all-time pass receiving records. In October 1958, the Los Angeles Times noted: "Had the Pacific Coast Conference not limited him to five games this season though, Wallen perhaps would have swept the slate clean."

Wallen finished his collegiate career at UCLA with 62 receptions for 822 yards, nine touchdowns and an average of 13.3 yards per reception.

== Wallen the "Model Collegian" ==
Wallen excelled in the classroom as well as the football field. A 1957 profile of Wallen in the Los Angeles Times bore the headline: "MODEL COLLEGIAN: Wallen Tops on Campus as Well as Gridiron." Wallen was a physics major who expressed no interest in playing professional football, stating his intent instead to attend law school and become a patent attorney. He spent his summers working in a patent law office, and the author of the Times profile opined that "if they were picking an All-America of model college students, this 21-year-old junior from Alhambra might be named captain of the first team."

Wallen was inducted into the UCLA Athletics Hall of Fame in 1996.
