= Jim Shanley (American football) =

American football player (1936-2019)

No. 22
- Position: Halfback

Personal information
- Born: July 27, 1936; Shelton, Nebraska, U.S.
- Died: July 10, 2019 (aged 82); Eugene, Oregon, U.S.
- Listed height: 5 ft 9 in (1.75 m)
- Listed weight: 174 lb (79 kg)

Career information
- College: Oregon

Career history
- Green Bay Packers (1958)

Awards and highlights
- Second-team All-American (1957); First-team All-PCC (1957); Second-team All-PCC (1956)

Career statistics
- Rushing attempts: 23
- Rushing yards: 30
- Receptions: 3
- Receiving yards: 13
- Punt returns: 14
- Return yards: 105
- Stats at Pro Football Reference

James Donald Shanley (July 27, 1936 - July 10, 2019) was an American professional football player who was a halfback for the Green Bay Packers of the National Football League (NFL). He played college football for the Oregon Ducks.
