= Jerry Kramer =

American football player (born 1936)

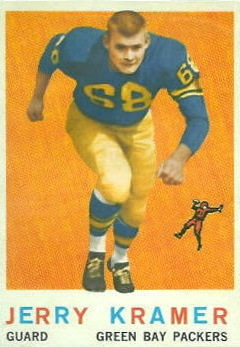
- Kramer's 1959 Topps football card

No. 64
- Positions: Guard, kicker

Personal information
- Born: January 23, 1936 (age 90); Jordan, Montana, U.S.
- Listed height: 6 ft 3 in (1.91 m)
- Listed weight: 245 lb (111 kg)

Career information
- High school: Sandpoint (Sandpoint, Idaho)
- College: Idaho (1955–1957)
- NFL draft: 1958: 4th round, 39th overall pick

Career history
- Green Bay Packers (1958–1968)

Awards and highlights
- 2× Super Bowl champion (I, II); 5× NFL champion (1961, 1962, 1965–1967); 5× First-team All-Pro (1960, 1962, 1963, 1966, 1967); 2× Second-team All-Pro (1961, 1968); 3× Pro Bowl (1962, 1963, 1967); NFL 1960s All-Decade Team; NFL 50th Anniversary All-Time Team; Green Bay Packers Hall of Fame; First-team All-PCC (1957); Idaho Vandals No. 64 retired

Career NFL statistics
- Games played: 130
- Games started: 120
- Field goals made: 29
- Field goals attempted: 54
- Field goal percentage: 53.7%
- Points scored: 177
- Longest field goal: 46
- Stats at Pro Football Reference
- Pro Football Hall of Fame

Gerald Louis Kramer (born January 23, 1936) is an American former professional football player, author and sports commentator. He played 11 years as a guard and kicker with the Green Bay Packers of the National Football League (NFL). He was inducted into the Pro Football Hall of Fame in 2018.

Kramer played college football for the Idaho Vandals before being selected by Green Bay in the fourth round of the 1958 NFL draft. Kramer was an integral part of the famous Packers sweep, a signature play in which both guards rapidly pull out from their normal positions and lead-block for the halfbacks going around the end. Kramer was an All-Pro five times, and a member of the National Football League 50th Anniversary All-Time Team.

Before his election into the Hall of Fame at age 82, Kramer was noted for being a finalist for the Hall ten times without being voted in. In 2008, he was rated No. 1 in NFL Network's Top 10 list of players not in the Hall. Kramer was inducted into the Hall of Fame on August 4, 2018. At his induction speech, he quoted something his high school coach had often told him: "You can if you will".

== Early life ==
Born in eastern Montana in Jordan, Kramer moved with his parents and five siblings from northern Utah to northern Idaho when he was in the fourth grade, settling in Sandpoint. After graduating from Sandpoint High School in 1954, he accepted a football scholarship to the University of Idaho in Moscow to play for new head coach Skip Stahley. In that era, Idaho was a member of the Pacific Coast Conference, the forerunner of the Pac-12.

Kramer was a standout two-way player for the Vandals, along with teammate (and road roommate) Wayne Walker of Boise, a future All-Pro linebacker with the Detroit Lions. Following the 1957 season, both played on the winning side in the East-West Shrine Game in late December in San Francisco, and at the College All-Star Game in Chicago in mid-August, in which they defeated the defending NFL champion Lions. Kramer was also a starter for the winning North team in the Senior Bowl in January in Mobile, Alabama.

Kramer's number 64 was retired by the university in 1963, on his 27th birthday. (He wore #74 as a sophomore tackle in 1955, and #57 on the freshman team in 1954.) While at UI, Kramer was a member of Sigma Nu fraternity, and also lettered in track and field (discus and shot put).

== Professional career ==
Kramer was the 39th selection of the 1958 NFL draft, taken in the fourth round by the Green Bay Packers. Two other hall of famers for the Packers were taken in this draft: fullback Jim Taylor of LSU in the second round (15th overall), and linebacker Ray Nitschke of Illinois in the third round (36th overall). Kramer played every game in his rookie season of 1958 under first-year head coach Ray "Scooter" McLean, but the Packers finished with the worst record (1–10–1) in the twelve-team league. In January 1959, the Packers hired a new head coach, Vince Lombardi, the offensive coach of the New York Giants.

Jerry Kramer did not know how good he was when he first joined the Green Bay Packers. You'd be surprised how much confidence a little success will bring.

— Vince Lombardi

With Kramer playing right guard, the Packers won five NFL titles and the first two Super Bowls, all under Lombardi. A key blocker in the Packers sweep play, he was also the team's placekicker in 1962, 1963, and part of 1968. As a kicker, Kramer made 29 field goals, 90 extra points, for a total of 177 points. He also scored ten points, on three field goals and an extra point, in the Packers 16−7 victory over the New York Giants in the 1962 NFL Championship Game at frigid Yankee Stadium. In 1963, he was jovially described as "the best knuckleball kicker in the NFL." In college at Idaho, he was also a kicker, with Walker as his long snapper; Walker was also a part-time kicker in the NFL for Detroit.

During his NFL career, Kramer was often injured: among these were surgery to remove sizable wood fragments embedded in his abdomen from a teenage accident over a decade earlier, and a badly injured ankle suffered in 1961. In all, Kramer played in 129 regular season games; he also had 22 surgeries in 11 seasons, including a colostomy, which he described as "a horror movie that hasn't been made yet." Despite these setbacks, Kramer was selected as an All-Pro five times (1960, 1962, 1963, 1966, and 1967); he was elected to the Wisconsin Athletic Hall of Fame in 1993. Kramer is a member of the NFL's 50th Anniversary All-Time team, and was the final member of the team to be elected into the Pro Football Hall of Fame. In 2003, he was named to the Professional Football Researchers Association Hall of Very Good in the association's inaugural HOVG class.

On August 24, 2017, Kramer and Houston Oilers linebacker Robert Brazile were named as Seniors Committee finalists for the Pro Football Hall of Fame for 2018. On February 3, 2018, both were selected for induction into the Hall of Fame as part of its 2018 class, with induction occurring on Saturday, August 4.

Kramer also did some broadcasting as a color commentator for CBS in 1969, and later for NBC - Week 2, with Chuck Thompson on the play-by-play, Miami Dolphins @ Buffalo Bills, on September 11, 1988.

== Work as author ==
In his penultimate season of 1967, Kramer collaborated with Dick Schaap on his first book, the best-selling Instant Replay, a diary of the season which chronicled the life of a professional football offensive lineman. The book climaxed with Kramer's lead block in front of Bart Starr to win the "Ice Bowl" championship game. Kramer and Schaap wrote two more books together. Kramer played one more year, under new head coach Phil Bengtson in 1968. Following that season, in which the aging Packers fell to a record of 6–7–1 and missed the playoffs, he wrote a second book, Farewell to Football. After retiring as a player in May 1969, Kramer briefly worked as a color commentator on CBS' NFL telecasts.

Following Lombardi's death from cancer in 1970, Kramer edited Lombardi: Winning Is the Only Thing, a collection of reminiscences from coaches, players, friends and family of Lombardi whom Kramer interviewed for the book.

In 1985, Kramer wrote Distant Replay, which updated the whereabouts of the members of the Packers' Super Bowl I championship team following a team reunion at Lambeau Field during the 1984 season.

In October 2005, he released Inside the Locker Room, a CD set that includes Lombardi's final locker room address as the head coach of the Packers in January 1968, immediately after Super Bowl II. In September 2006, Kramer re-released his 1968 bestseller, Instant Replay.

In 2023, Kramer co-wrote 'Run to Win' with Bob Fox. The book was published by Triumph Books.

== Health issues ==
Kramer was noteworthy for overcoming a series of accidents and health issues prior to and during his professional football career. The most serious was in 1964; he played the first two games then missed the rest of the season, later diagnosed at the Mayo Clinic with actinomycosis. After his wood fragment removal surgery in May 1965, he reclaimed his starting position at right guard and the Packers won three straight NFL titles (and the first two Super Bowls) and he was a first-team All-Pro twice more.

The original accident in the summer of 1953 occurred when Kramer was chasing a calf on his family's farm and the calf stepped on a board, shattering it and shooting a lance-shaped splinter of wood into Kramer's abdomen; after piercing his abdomen, the splinter partially exited Kramer's back between two vertebrae. Doctors cut the piece in two and pulled it out front and back; two weeks later, Kramer was at pre-season football practice at Sandpoint High School for his senior season. As a freshman, he backed into a lathe in shop class and incurred muscle damage to a hip, and was later in a car accident. While hunting, Kramer's shotgun exploded, which significantly injured his right forearm. He suffered broken bones, torn muscles, and nerve damage, which required plastic surgery and skin grafts. Some of the lead shot also penetrated his liver. To this day, Kramer cannot use the little finger on his right hand.

In college at Idaho, Kramer was on the field for nearly every play until the final game when he incurred a minor knee injury. He played in two All-Star games shortly after.

== Personal life ==
After retirement from the NFL, Kramer lived on a ranch near Parma in southwestern Idaho with his second wife Wink, then later moved to Boise. Twice divorced, Kramer has six children: Tony, Diane, Daniel, Alicia, Matthew, and Jordan. He has five grandchildren. His youngest sons, Matt and Jordan Kramer, also played college football at the University of Idaho. Jordan, named after the Montana town in which Kramer was born, played two seasons in the NFL as a linebacker with the Tennessee Titans in 2003 and 2004.

After turning eighty in early 2016, Kramer auctioned off several items of memorabilia to raise college funds for his grandchildren, including his ring from the first Super Bowl, which was sold for $125,000.
