= 1958 Rose Bowl =

American college football game

- 44th Rose Bowl Game
Oregon Ducks	Ohio State Buckeyes
(7–3)	(8–1)
Pacific Coast	Big Ten
7	10
Head coach: Len Casanova	Head coach: Woody Hayes
AP / Coaches; NR / 17	AP / Coaches; 2 / 1
	1	2	3	4	Total
Oregon	0	7	0	0	7
Ohio State	7	0	0	3	10
- Date: January 1, 1958
- Season: 1957
- Stadium: Rose Bowl
- Location: Pasadena, California
- MVP: Jack Crabtree (Oregon QB)
- Favorite: Ohio State by 20 points
- Referee: Tony Skover (Big Ten; split crew: Big Ten, Pacific Coast)
- Attendance: 98,202

United States TV coverage
- Network: NBC (B/W)
- Announcers: Mel Allen, Chick Hearn

The 1958 Rose Bowl was the 44th edition of the college football bowl game, played at the Rose Bowl in Pasadena, California, on Wednesday, January 1. The heavily favored Ohio State Buckeyes of the Big Ten Conference defeated the Oregon Ducks of the Pacific Coast Conference by a score of 10–7.

Oregon quarterback Jack Crabtree was named the Player of the Game, one of only two players in Rose Bowl history from a losing team to win the award outright.

== Teams ==
=== Ohio State Buckeyes ===
Ohio State came into the game with an eight-game winning streak, having dropped their season opener to TCU and then winning the rest of their games. They were ranked first in the Coaches' Poll and second in the AP Poll behind Auburn (on probation due to recruiting violations and was therefore not eligible for a bowl game. The Buckeyes were heavily favored to win the Rose Bowl, by up to three touchdowns.

=== Oregon Ducks ===
Oregon came into the Rose Bowl having just lost its Civil War rivalry game to Oregon State, which put the two teams into a tie for the Pacific Coast Conference championship. Normally, Oregon State would have gone to the Rose Bowl with the head-to-head victory; however, Oregon State had appeared in the 1957 Rose Bowl a year earlier, and the PCC had a no-repeat rule. Oregon had not been in the Rose Bowl since 1920.

== Game summary ==
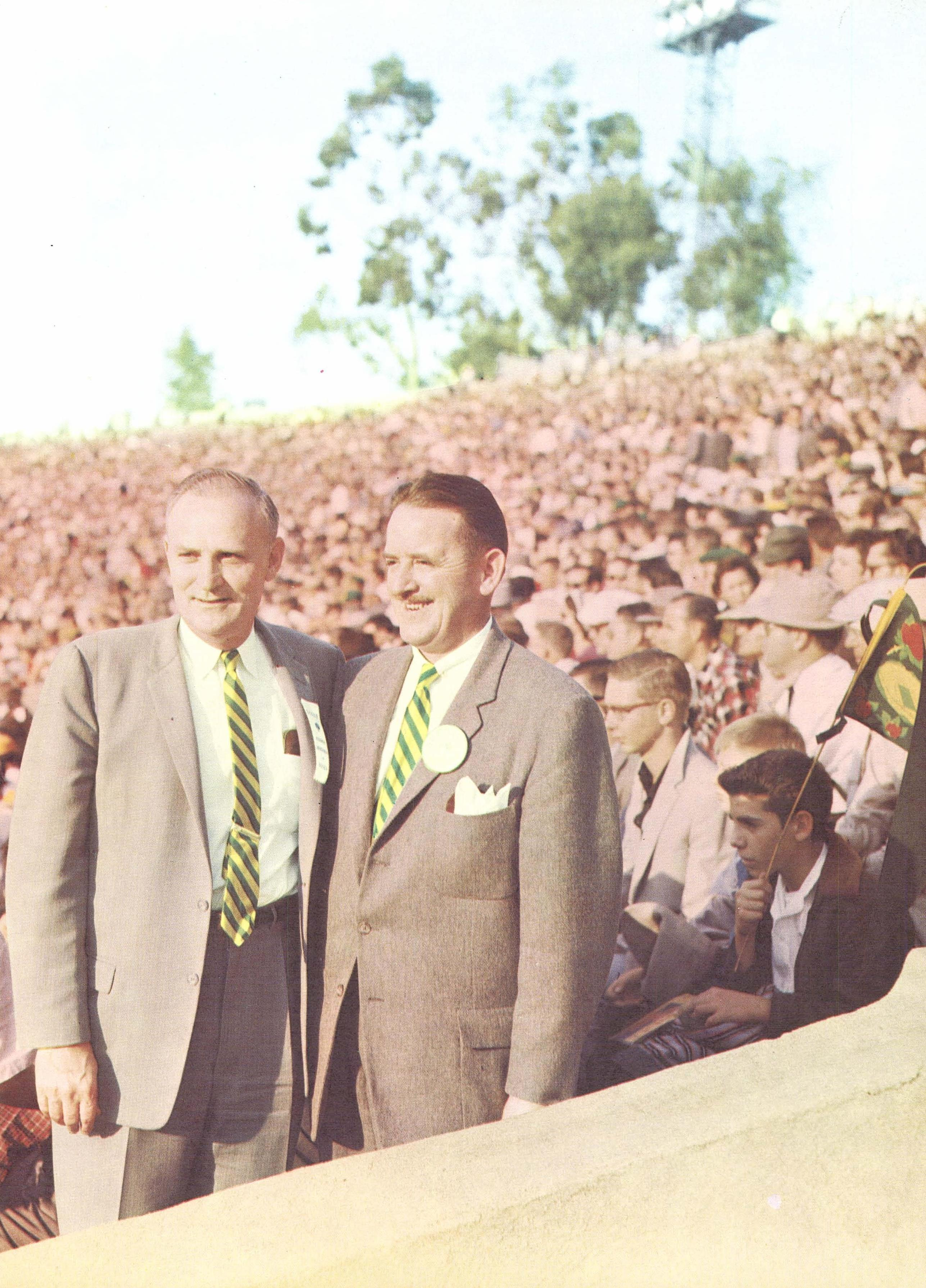
University of Oregon President O. Meredith Wilson and Governor Robert D. Holmes attend the game

Ohio State took the opening possession 79 yards, capped by a one-yard run by quarterback Frank Kremblas, to take a 7–0 lead. Oregon tied the game in the second quarter with a 5-yard run from Jim Shanley after an 80-yard, 10-play drive.

The score remained 7–7 well into the second half. With 5:20 left in the third quarter, the Ducks had a chance to take the lead, but kicker Jack Morris' 34-yard field goal try hooked wide to the left. Early in the fourth quarter, Ohio State's Don Sutherin attempted a kick from the same spot; his kick was good, and Ohio State led by three with fourteen minutes remaining.

On their next possession, the Ducks were driving until end Ron Stover fumbled inside the Ohio State thirty. With time running out in the game, Oregon got the ball back and had a chance to tie or go ahead, but Crabtree's fourth-down pass to Stover fell incomplete with 47 seconds remaining, and the Buckeyes held on to win, 10–7.

The Ducks outgained the Buckeyes 351 to 304 and made 21 first downs to the Buckeyes' 19. Crabtree was 10 of 17 passing for 135 yards. Stover had 10 receptions on the day, and his 144 receiving yards established a new record for PCC participants.

=== Scoring ===
==== First quarter ====
- Ohio State - Frank Kremblas 1 run (Kremblas kick)

==== Second quarter ====
- Oregon - Jim Shanley 5-yard run (Jack Morris kick)

==== Third quarter ====
No scoring

==== Fourth quarter ====
- Ohio State - Don Sutherin 34 field goal

=== Aftermath ===
The final AP (media) and UPI (coaches) polls came out before the bowl games, so this game did nothing to change the polls. Ohio State's No. 1 ranking in the final poll earned it a share of the national championship, its third such title. Auburn retained the #1 AP ranking despite their probation status. Buckeye coach Woody Hayes was named College Football Coach of the Year.

Oregon's Jack Crabtree became one of a very few players of a losing team to win the Player of the Game award, and one of only two to win the award without sharing it with a member of the winning team. Benny Lom of California in 1929, who tackled teammate Roy Riegels (after a wrong-way run with the ball), is the only other solo Player of the Game from a losing team.

Oregon, appearing in its first Rose Bowl in 38 years, waited another 37 years to return in 1995. This was the last bowl meeting between the Buckeyes and Ducks until the 2010 Rose Bowl, which Ohio State won 26–17.
