= List of Pennsylvania Dutch-language poets =

List of Pennsylvania Dutch language poets. This is a list of poets who write, or wrote, in Pennsylvania Dutch.

== B ==
- John Birmelin (1873–1950)

== D ==
- Solomon DeLong (1849–1925)

== F ==
- H. L. Fischer (1822–1909)

== G ==
- Ezra Light Grumbine (1845–1923)
- Lee Light Grumbine (1858–1904)

== H ==
- Edward Hermany (1832–1896)

== M ==
- Henry Meyer (1840–1925)

== T ==
- William S. Troxell (1893–1957)

== W ==
- Tobias Witmer (1816–1897)
- Louis August Wollenweber (1807–1888)
- Astor C. Wuchter (1856–1933)

== Z ==
- Calvin Ziegler (1854–1930)
- Thomas Zimmerman (1838–1914)
