= Pennsylvania Dutch language =

Variety of West Central German

Pennsylvania Dutch
- Pennsylvania German
- Pennsilfaanisch Deitsch
- Native to: United States, Canada
- Region: United States: Indiana; Illinois; Iowa; Kentucky; Missouri; New York; Ohio; Pennsylvania; Tennessee; West Virginia; Wisconsin; Canada: Ontario; Winchester; Chesterfield; York; Nottingham; Elsewhere in North America and in Belize
- Ethnicity: Pennsylvania Dutch
- Native speakers: 237,000 (2016–2020 American Community Survey) to 350,000 (2012) (L2 speakers: about 3,000)
- Language family: Indo-European: Germanic; West Germanic; Weser-Rhine Germanic; Central German; West Central German; Rhine Franconian; Pfälzisch–Lothringisch; Palatine German; Pennsylvania Dutch
- Early forms: Proto-Indo-European: Proto-Germanic; Frankish; Old High Franconian; Old Rhine Franconian

Language codes
- ISO 639-3: pdc
- Glottolog: penn1240
- ELP: Pennsylvania German
- Linguasphere: 52-ACB-he
- Pennsylvania Dutch distribution in the United States

- Pennsylvania Dutch is not endangered according to the classification system of the UNESCO Atlas of the World's Languages in Danger.

Pennsylvania Dutch (Deitsch, Pennsilfaanisch-Deitsch or Pennsilfaanisch) or Pennsylvania German is a variety of Palatine German spoken by the Pennsylvania Dutch, including the Amish, Mennonites, Fancy Dutch, and other related groups in the United States and Canada. There are approximately 300,000 native speakers of Pennsylvania Dutch in the United States and Canada.

The language traditionally has been spoken by the Pennsylvania Dutch, who are descendants of late 17th- and early to late 18th-century immigrants to Pennsylvania, Maryland, Virginia, West Virginia, and North Carolina, who arrived primarily from southern Germany and, to a lesser degree, the regions of Alsace and Lorraine in eastern France, and parts of Switzerland.

Differing explanations exist on why the Pennsylvania Dutch are referred to as Dutch, which typically refers to the inhabitants of the Netherlands or the Dutch language, only distantly related to Pennsylvania German.

Speakers of the dialect today are primarily found in Pennsylvania, Ohio, Indiana, and other Midwestern states, as well as parts of the southern United States such as in Kentucky and Tennessee, and in Ontario in Canada. The dialect historically was also spoken in other regions where its use has largely or entirely faded. The use of Pennsylvania Dutch as a street language in urban areas of Pennsylvania, including Allentown, Reading, Lancaster, and York, was declining by the beginning of the 20th century. In more rural Pennsylvania areas, it continued in widespread use until World War II. Since that time, its use in Pennsylvania rural areas has greatly declined. It is best preserved in the Old Order Amish and Old Order Mennonite communities, and presently the members of both groups make up the vast majority of Pennsylvania Dutch speakers.

== European origins ==
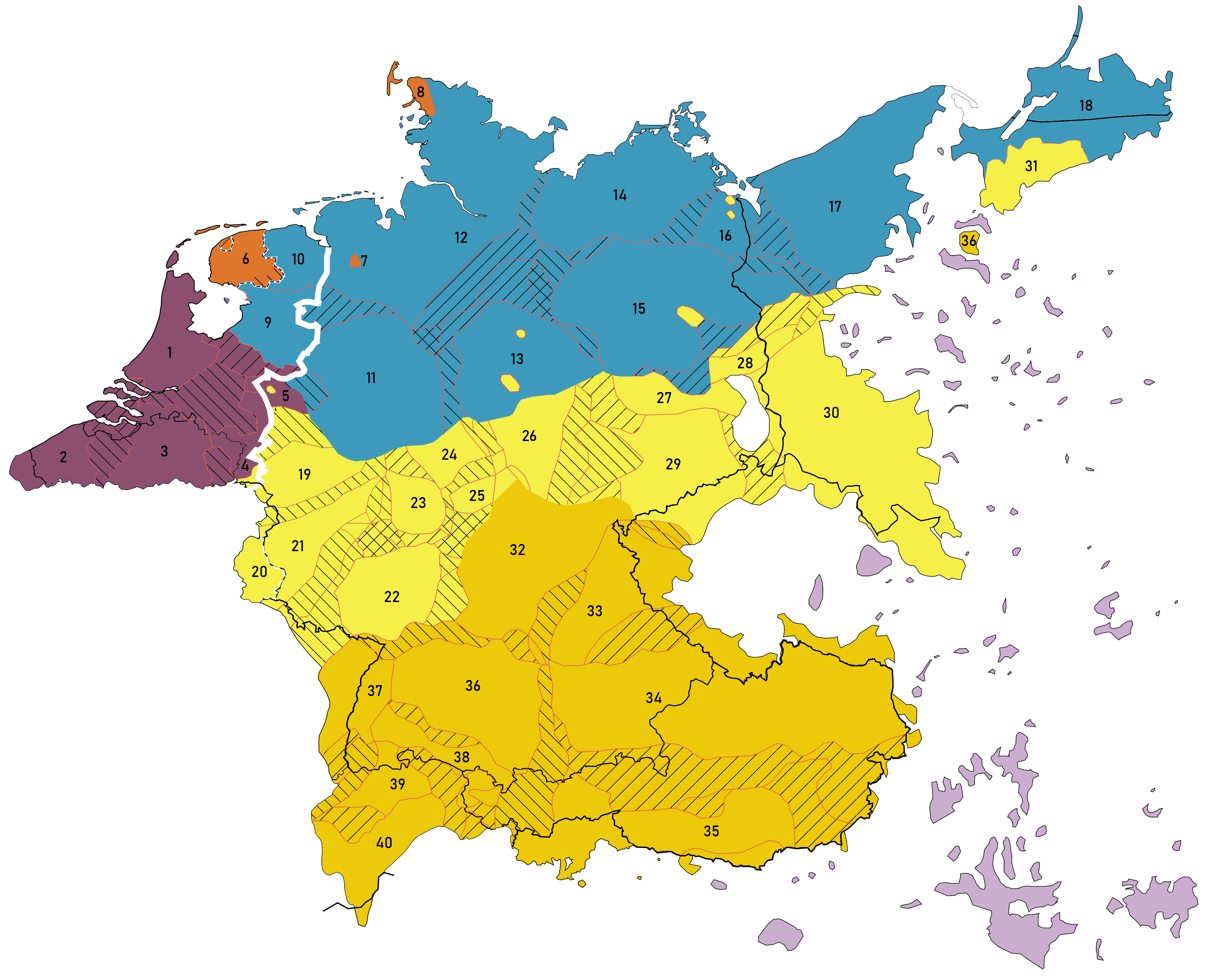
A linguistic map of West Germanic dialects on the European mainland prior to World War II: High German is yellow and orange, including Pennsylvania Dutch and Palatine.

The ancestors of Pennsylvania Dutch speakers came from various parts of the southwestern regions of German-speaking Europe, including Baden, Palatinate (region), Hesse, Saxony, Swabia, Württemberg, Alsace, German Lorraine, and Switzerland. Most of the people in these areas spoke Rhine Franconian, especially Palatine German and, to a lesser degree, Alemannic dialects; it is believed that in the first generations after the settlers arrived, the dialects merged, as there were few new German immigrants for a period of ~60 years. (ca. 1760 to ca. 1820). The result of that dialect leveling was a dialect very close to the eastern dialects of Palatine German, especially the rural dialects around Mannheim/Ludwigshafen.

Pennsylvania Dutch is mainly derived from Palatine German which at the present time spoken mainly by older Germans in the Rhine-Neckar Metropolitan Region, a region almost identical to the historical Palatinate. There are similarities between the German dialect that is still spoken in this small part of southwestern Germany and Pennsylvania Dutch. When individuals from the Palatinate (Pfalz) region of Germany today encounter Pennsylvania Dutch speakers, conversation is often possible to a limited degree.

== Comparison with Standard German ==
Pennsylvania Dutch for the most part does not reflect the diverse origins of the early speakers from regions along the upper Rhine River (Rhineland, Württemberg, Baden, Saarland, Switzerland and Alsace) but almost exclusively the strong immigrant group from the Palatine.

Pennsylvania Dutch is not a corrupted form of Standard German, since Standard German developed as a written standard based on the various spoken German dialects in a very long process that started in the time of classical Middle High German (1170–1250). Pennsylvania Dutch instead reflects the independent development of Palatine German, especially from the region that is called Vorderpfalz in German.

Since Pennsylvania Dutch is largely derived from Palatine German, which did not fully undergo the High German consonant shift, several vowels and consonants in Pennsylvania Dutch differ when compared with Standard German or Upper German dialects such as Alemannic and Bavarian.

The American English influence is most significant on vocabulary and to a much lesser degree on pronunciation; the English influence on grammar is relatively small. The question of whether the large loss of the dative case—the most significant difference compared with Palatine German—is due to English influence or reflects an inner development is disputed.

=== Grammar ===
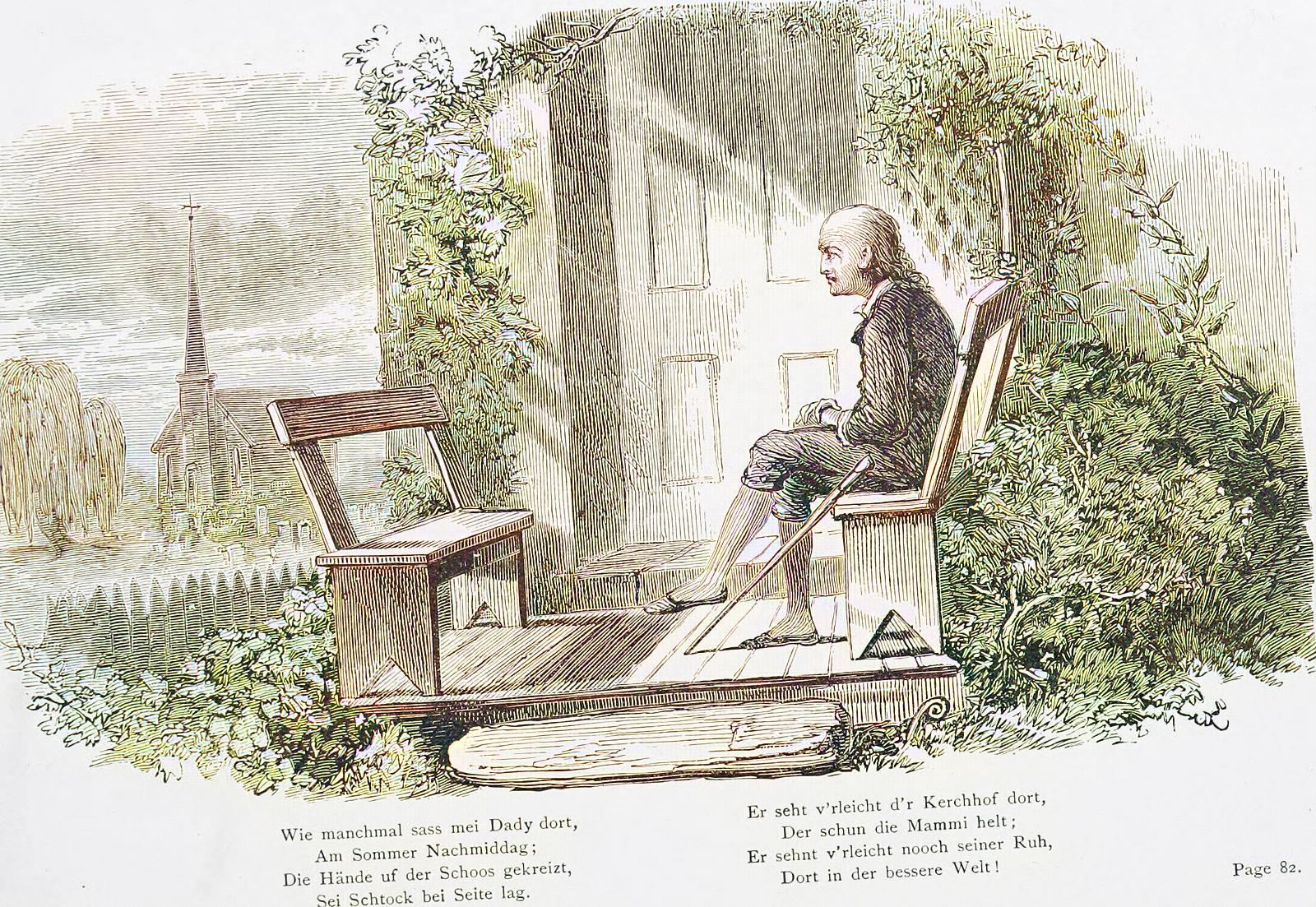
Pennsylvania Dutch writer Henry Harbaugh

As in Standard German, Pennsylvania Dutch uses three genders (masculine, feminine, and neuter). Pennsylvania Dutch has three cases for personal pronouns: the accusative, nominative, and dative, and two cases for nouns: the common case, with both accusative and nominative functions, and the dative case. There is no genitive case in Pennsylvania Dutch. The historical genitive case has been replaced by the dative, and possession is indicated with a special construction using the dative and the possessive pronoun: 'the man's dog' becomes em Mann sei Hund (literally: 'to the man his dog'). Studies have shown variability in the use of the dative case in both sectarian and non-sectarian communities. The trend is towards use of the common case for nouns and the accusative case for pronouns, instead of the dative. Thus, em Mann sei Hund, for example, has frequently become der Mann sei Hund.

The dative case in Pennsylvania German is used to express possession, to mark objects of prepositions, to mark indirect objects, and to indicate the direct objects of certain verbs. It is expressed, as in Standard German, through the use of dative forms of personal pronouns and through certain inflections of articles and adjectives modifying nouns. In non-sectarian speech in central Pennsylvania, the dative is widely used among the older generations who are fluent in Pennsylvania German, whereas younger semi-speakers tend not to use the dative as much. Many semi-speakers used the English possessive -'s.

In contrast, Anabaptists in central Pennsylvania had almost completely replaced the dative with the accusative case. Meanwhile, members of the entirely Pennsylvania Dutch-speaking community in Kalona, Iowa, all of whom were Amish or Mennonite, showed strong age-related variation. Speakers under the age of 40 never used the dative, while older speakers showed strongly variable behavior. There was little difference between members of the different religious denominations in the Kalona.

Many verbs of English origin are used in Pennsylvania Dutch. Most English-origin verbs are treated as German weak verbs, receiving a past participle with a ge- prefix and a -t suffix, thus for example the past participle of 'change' is usually ge-change-t. Verbs with unstressed first syllables generally do not take the ge- prefix, so the past participle of 'adopt' is adopted, as in English. This follows the pattern of words with inseparable prefixes in German. However, English-origin verbs which are stressed on the first syllable may also appear without the ge- prefix. Thus, 'realize' is conjugated simply as realized, and 'farm' may be conjugated as farmed or ge-farm-t. Some German-origin verbs may also appear without the ge- prefix. Schwetze 'talk, speak', may be conjugated as geschwetzt or simply as schwetzt. Both English influence and overall simplification may be at work in the dropping of the ge- prefix.

Pennsylvania Dutch, like Standard German, has many separable verbs composed of a root verb and a prefix. Some of these in Standard German are completely semantically transparent, such as mit-gehen 'to go with', from mit- 'with' and gehen 'go'. Others, like mit-teilen lit. 'with-share' which means 'to inform' and not the sharing of concrete entities, are not semantically transparent. That is, their meaning is not the sum of their parts. Separable verbs are used widely in Pennsylvania Dutch, and separable verbs can even be formed with English roots and prefixes. Virtually all separable verbs in Pennsylvania Dutch are semantically transparent. Many semantically opaque separable verbs such as um-ziehe lit. 'pull around', meaning, 'to move house', has been replaced by the English word move.

Adjectival endings exist but appear simplified compared to Standard German. As in all other South German dialects, the past tense is generally expressed using the perfect: Ich bin ins Feld glaafe ('I have run into the field') and not the simple past (Ich lief ins Feld ['I ran into the field']), which is retained only in the verb "to be", as war or ware, corresponding to English was and were. The subjunctive mood is extant only as Konjunktiv I (Konjunktiv II is totally lost) in a limited number of verbs. In all other verbs it is expressed through the form of Konjunktiv I of the verbs 'to do' (du) and 'to have' (hawwe/have) combined with the infinitive or the past participle, e.g., ich daet esse ('I would eat'), ich hett gesse ('I would have eaten').

Two examples of Pennsylvania Dutch grammars are A Simple Grammar of Pennsylvania Dutch by J. William Frey and A Pennsylvania German Reader and Grammar by Earl C. Haag.

=== Pronunciation ===
The tables below use IPA symbols to compare sounds used in Standard German (to the left) with sounds that correspond to them in their Pennsylvania Dutch cognates, reflecting their respective evolutions since they diverged from a common origin.

==== Vowels ====
Standard German vowel	Pennsylvania Dutch vowel	Standard German cognate	Pennsylvania Dutch cognate
/œ/	/ɛ/	Köpfe	Kepp
/øː/	/eː/	schön	schee
/ʏ/	/ɪ/	dünn	dinn
/yː/	/iː/	Kühe	Kieh
/aː/	/oː/ (in some words)	schlafen	schloofe
/aʊ/ from Middle High German /oʊ/	/ɔː/	auch	aa
/aʊ/ from Middle High German /uː/	/aʊ/ (in some dialects /aː/)	Haus	Haus
/ɔʏ/	/aɪ/	neu	nei
/o/	/ʌ/	Boden	Bodde

==== Consonants ====
Standard German consonant	Pennsylvania Dutch consonant	Standard German cognate	Pennsylvania Dutch cognate
/b/	/v/	Kübel	Kiwwel
/ɡ/ (mostly following a vowel + /r/)	/j/	morgen	morje
/k/ (before a liquid)	/ɡ/	klein	glee
final /n/	–	waschen [ˈva.ʃən]	wasche [ˈva.ʃə]
/p/	/b/ (often)	putzen [ˈpʰuːt.tsən]	butze [ˈbuːd.sə]
/pf/	/p/	Pfarrer [ˈpfaː.rər]	Parrer [ˈpaː.rər]
final /r/	–	Herz	Hatz
/r/	/ɹ/		
/s/ (before /p/ or /t/)	/ʃ/	bist	bischt
/t/	/d/	tot [ˈtʰoːt]	dod [ˈdoːd]
final /ts/ (after /l/ and /n/)	/s/	Holz [ˈhoːlts]	Holz [ˈhoːls]

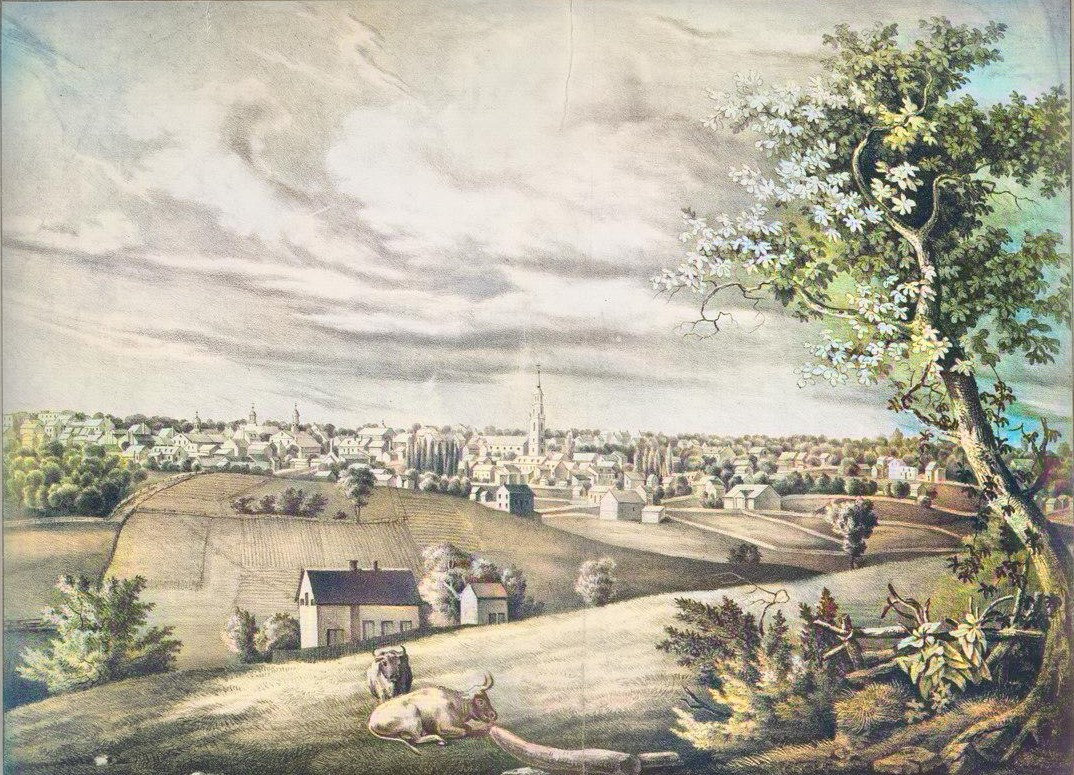
Lancaster, Pennsylvania, in 1845

In Lancaster County, Pennsylvania, there have been numerous other shifts that can make their Pennsylvania Dutch particularly difficult for modern High German speakers to understand. A word beginning in ⟨gs⟩ in some subdialects becomes ⟨ts⟩, which is more easily pronounced, and so German gesund > gsund > tsund and German gesagt > gsaat > tsaat. Likewise, German gescheid > gscheid > tscheid /tʃaɪt/. German zurück > zrick > tsrick /tʃɹɪk/. The shift is rather common with German children learning to speak.

The softened ⟨w⟩ after guttural consonants has mixed with the guttural ⟨r⟩ of earlier generations and also turned into an American ⟨r⟩ and so German gewesen > gwest > grest and German geschwind > gschwind > tschrind /tʃɹɪnt/. The changes in pronunciation, combined with the general disappearance of declensions as described above, result in a form of the dialect that has evolved somewhat from its early Pennsylvania origins nearly 300 years ago and is still rather easy to understand by German dialect speakers of the Rhineland-Palatinate area.

== Interaction with English ==
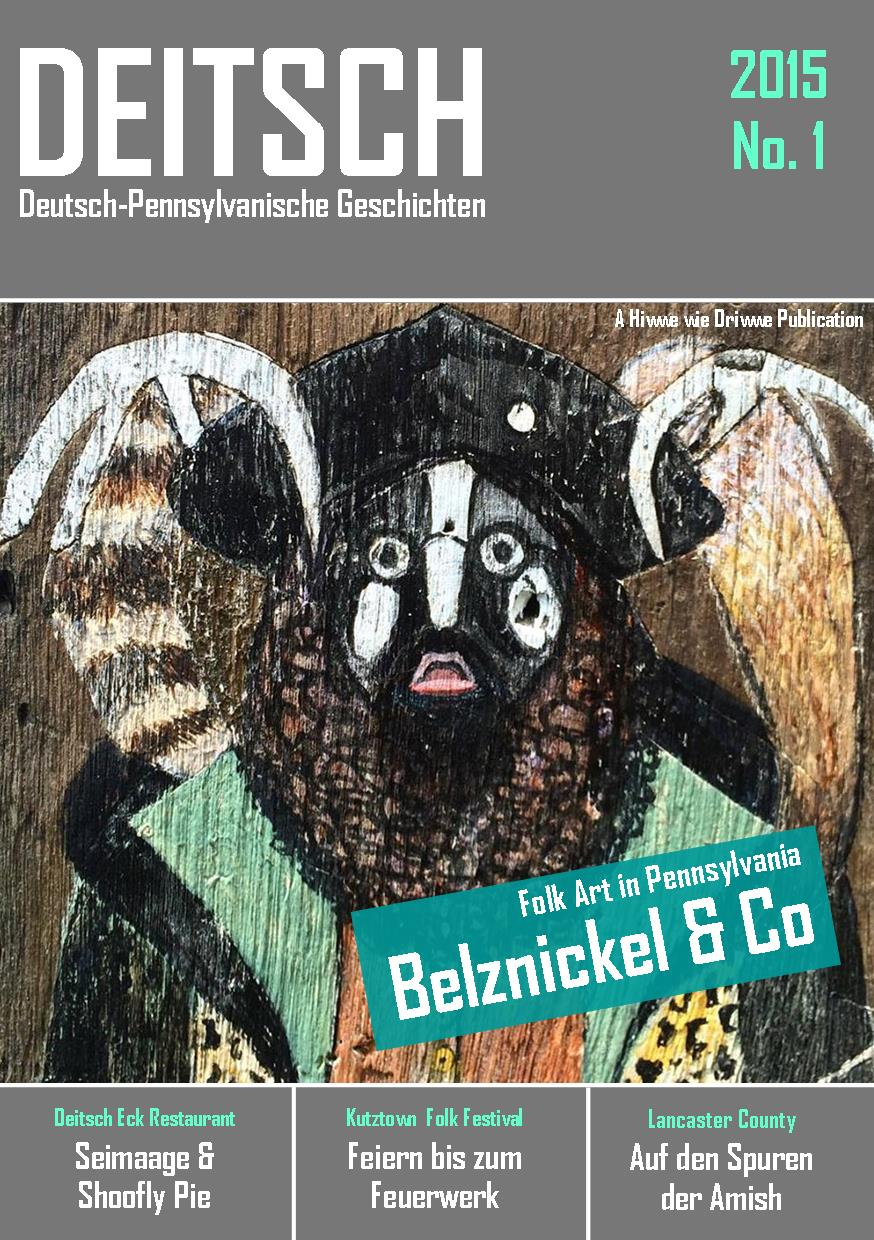
Pennsylvania Dutch arts history in Pennsylvania Dutch language

The people from southern Germany, eastern France and Switzerland, where the Pennsylvania Dutch culture and dialect sprung, started to arrive in North America in the late 17th and the early 18th centuries, before the beginning of the Industrial Revolution. To a more limited extent, that is also true of a second wave of immigration in the mid-19th century, which came from the same regions, but settled more frequently in Ohio, Indiana, and other parts of the Midwest. Thus, an entire industrial vocabulary relating to electricity, machinery and modern farming implements has naturally been borrowed from the English. For Pennsylvania Dutch speakers who work in a modern trade or in an industrial environment, this could potentially increase the challenge of maintaining their mother tongue.

Numerous English words have been borrowed and adapted for use in Pennsylvania Dutch since the first generations of Pennsylvania German habitation of southeastern Pennsylvania. Examples of English loan words that are relatively common are bet (Ich bet, du kannscht Deitsch schwetze 'I bet you can speak Pennsylvania Dutch'), depend (Es dependt en wennig, waer du bischt 'it depends somewhat on who you are'); tschaepp for 'chap' or 'guy'; and tschumbe for 'to jump'. Today, many speakers will use Pennsylvania Dutch words for the smaller numerals and English for larger and more complicated numbers, like $27,599.

Conversely, although many among the earlier generations of Pennsylvania Dutch could speak English, they were known for speaking it with a strong and distinctive accent. Such Pennsylvania Dutch English can still sometimes be heard. Although the more-recently coined term is being used in the context of this and related articles to describe this Pennsylvania Dutch-influenced English, it has traditionally been referred to as "Dutchy" or "Dutchified" English.

== Written language ==
Pennsylvania Dutch has primarily been a spoken dialect throughout its history, with very few of its speakers making much of an attempt to read or write it. Writing in Pennsylvania Dutch can be a difficult task, and there is no spelling standard for the dialect. There are currently two primary competing models upon which numerous orthographic (i.e., spelling) systems have been based by individuals who attempt to write in the Pennsylvania Dutch dialect. One 'school' tends to follow the rules of American English orthography, the other the rules of Standard German orthography (developed by Preston Barba and Albert F. Buffington). The choice of writing system is not meant to imply any difference in pronunciation. For comparison, a translation into Pennsylvania Dutch, using two spelling systems, of the Lord's Prayer, as found in the common traditional language English translation, is presented below. The text in the second column illustrates a system based on American English orthography. The text in the third column uses, on the other hand, a system based on Standard German. The English original is found in the first column, and a Standard German version appears in the fifth column. (Note: The German version(s) of the Lord's Prayer most likely to have been used by Pennsylvania Germans would have been derived in most cases from Martin Luther's translation of the New Testament.)

English (traditional)	Writing system 1 (English-based)	Writing system 2 (German-based)	Modern Western Palatine German	Modern German (close translation)	Modern German (standard wording)
Our Father who art in heaven,	Unsah Faddah im Himmel,	Unser Vadder im Himmel,	Unser Vadder im Himmel	Unser Vater im Himmel,	Vater Unser im Himmel,
Hallowed be thy name.	dei nohma loss heilich sei,	dei Naame loss heilich sei,	Dei Name sell heilich sei,	Deinen Namen lass heilig sein,	geheiligt werde dein Name,
Thy kingdom come.	Dei Reich loss kumma.	Dei Reich loss komme.	Dei Reich sell kumme,	Dein Reich lass kommen.	Dein Reich komme.
Thy will be done,	Dei villa loss gedu sei,	Dei Wille loss gedu sei,	Dei Wille sell gschehe	Deinen Willen lass getan sein,	Dein Wille geschehe,
on earth as it is in heaven.	uf di eaht vi im Himmel.	uff die Erd wie im Himmel.	uf de Erd wie im Himmel.	auf der Erde wie im Himmel.	wie im Himmel, so auf Erden.
Give us this day our daily bread.	Unsah tayklich broht gebb uns heit,	Unser deeglich Brot gebb uns heit,	Geb uns heit das Brot, was mer de Daach brauchen,	Unser täglich Brot gib uns heute,	Unser tägliches Brot gib uns heute,
And forgive us our trespasses;	Un fagebb unsah shulda,	Un vergebb unser Schulde,	Un vergeb uns unser Schuld	Und vergib unsere Schuld,	Und vergib uns unsere Schuld,
as we forgive those who trespass against us.	vi miah dee fagevva vo uns shuldich sinn.	wie mir die vergewwe wu uns schuldich sinn.	wie mir denne vergewwe, wo an uns schuldich worre sin.	wie wir denen vergeben, die uns schuldig sind.	wie auch wir vergeben unseren Schuldigern.
And lead us not into temptation	Un fiah uns naett in di fasuchung,	Un fiehr uns net in die Versuchung,	Un fiehr uns nit in Versuchung,	Und führe uns nicht in die Versuchung,	Und führe uns nicht in Versuchung,
but deliver us from evil.	avvah hald uns fu'm eevila.	awwer hald uns vum ewile.	awwer rett uns vum Beese.	aber halte uns vom Üblen [fern].	sondern erlöse uns von dem Bösen.
For thine is the kingdom, the power	Fa dei is es Reich, di graft,	Fer dei is es Reich, die Graft,	Dir gheert jo es Reich, die Kraft,	Denn Dein ist das Reich, die Kraft	Denn Dein ist das Reich, und die Kraft
and the glory, For ever and ever.	un di hallichkeit in ayvichkeit.	un die Hallichkeit in Ewichkeit.	un die Herrlichkeit in Ewichkeit.	und die Herrlichkeit in Ewigkeit.	und die Herrlichkeit in Ewigkeit.
Amen.	Amen.	Amen.	Amen.	Amen.	Amen.

=== Pennsylvania High German ===
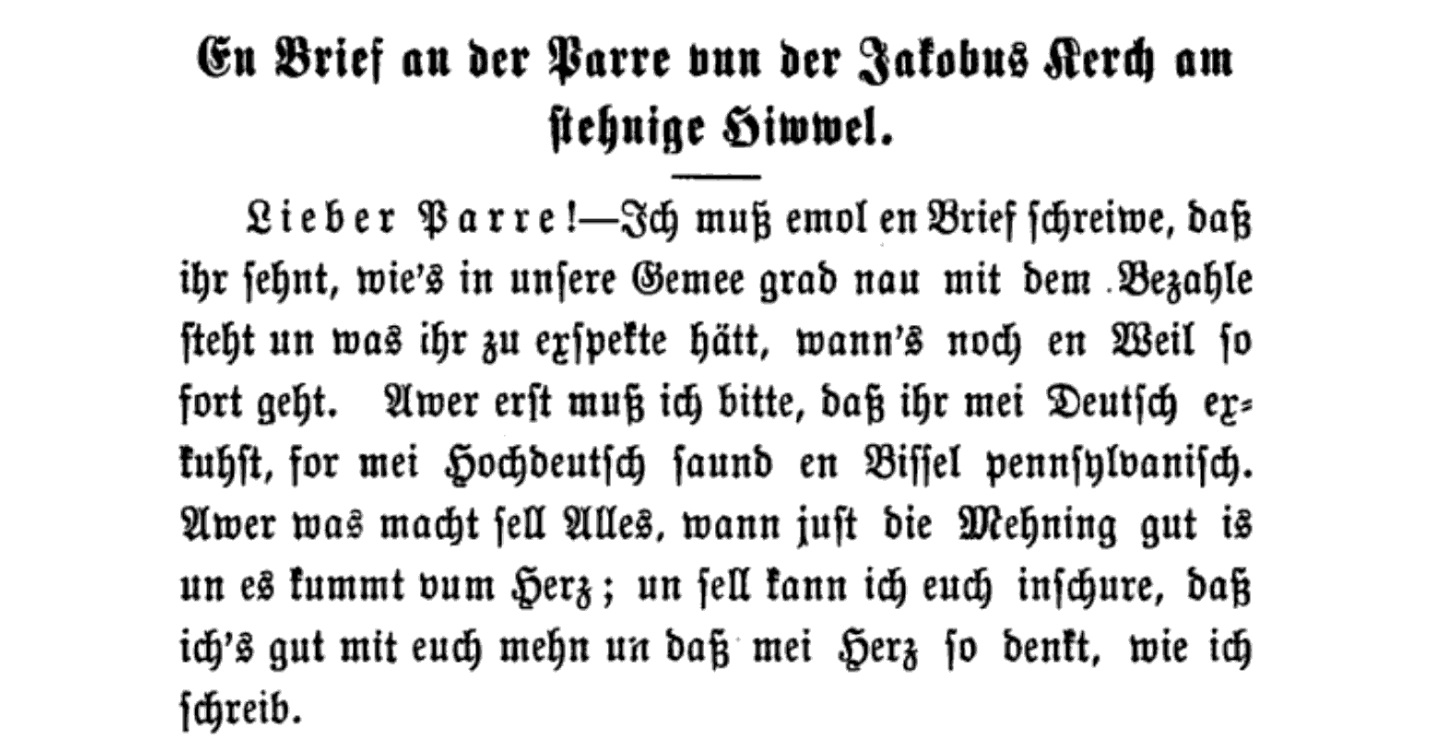
An example of Pennsylvania German written in Fraktur script

Pennsylvania High German is a literary form of Palatine written in Pennsylvania, the Palatinate, and other Palatine states (e.g. the Hessian Palatinate), used between the 1700s and early 1900s. In Pennsylvania, this literary form helped maintain German education and instruction, and was spoken in schools and churches. It is often seen in Fraktur art and script.

Immediately after the American Civil War, the federal government replaced Pennsylvania German schools with English-only schools. Literary German disappeared from Pennsylvania Dutch life little by little, starting with schools, and then to churches and newspapers. With the decline of German instruction, Pennsylvania High German became a dead language.

=== Publications ===
Since 1997, the Pennsylvania Dutch newspaper Hiwwe wie Driwwe allows dialect authors (of whom there are still about 100) to publish Pennsylvania Dutch poetry and prose. Hiwwe wie Driwwe was founded by Michael Werner. It is published twice a year (2,400 copies per issue)—since 2013 in cooperation with the Pennsylvania German Cultural Heritage Center at Kutztown University of Pennsylvania. Since 2002, the newspaper is published both online and in print.

In 2006, the German publishing house Edition Tintenfaß started to print books in Pennsylvania Dutch.

Wycliffe Bible Translators, Inc., using American English orthography (see Written language), has translated the Bible into Pennsylvania Dutch. The New Testament with Psalms and Proverbs was published in 2002 by the Bible League. The entire Bible, Di Heilich Shrift, was completed and published in 2013 by TGS International. Deitsh Books has published a dictionary (2013) and a grammar book (2014) by D Miller using the same American English orthography.

In 2014, Jehovah's Witnesses began to publish literature in Pennsylvania Dutch.

== Survival ==
Pennsylvania German sticker, saying, "We still speak the mother tongue"

Pennsylvania Dutch, which is now in its fourth century on North American soil, had more than 250,000 speakers in 2012. It has shifted its center to the West with approximately 160,000 speakers in Ohio, Indiana, Wisconsin, Iowa and other Midwest states. There is even a small but growing number of Pennsylvania Dutch speakers in Upper Barton Creek and Springfield in Belize among Old Order Mennonites of the Noah Hoover group. The dialect is used vigorously by the horse and buggy Old Order Mennonites in the northern part of the Regional Municipality of Waterloo in Ontario, Canada.

Speakers without an Anabaptist background in general do not pass the dialect to their children today, but the Old Order Amish and horse-and-buggy Old Order Mennonites do so in the current generation, and there are no signs that the practice will end in the future. There are only two car driving Anabaptist groups who have preserved the dialect: The Old Beachy Amish and the Kauffman Amish Mennonites, also called Sleeping Preacher Churches. Even though Amish and Old Order Mennonites were originally a minority group within the Pennsylvania Dutch-speaking population, today they form the vast majority. According to sociologist John A. Hostetler, less than 10 percent of the original Pennsylvania Dutch population was Amish or Mennonite.

As of 1989, non-sectarian, or non-Amish and non-Mennonite, native Pennsylvania-Dutch speaking parents have generally spoken to their children exclusively in English. The reasons they cited were preventing their children from developing a "Dutch" accent and preparing them for school. Older speakers generally did not see a reason for young people to speak it. Many of their children learned the language from hearing their parents using it and from interactions with the generation older than their parents. Among the first natively English speaking generation, oldest siblings typically speak Pennsylvania Dutch better than younger ones.

There have been efforts to advance the use of the dialect. Kutztown University of Pennsylvania offers a complete minor program in Pennsylvania German Studies. The program includes two full semesters of the Pennsylvania Dutch dialect. In the 2007–2008 school year, the classes were being taught by Professor Edward Quinter. In 2008–2009, Professor Robert Lusch served as the instructor.

According to one scholar, "today, almost all Amish are functionally bilingual in Pennsylvania Dutch and English; however, domains of usage are sharply separated. Pennsylvania Dutch dominates in most in-group settings, such as the dinner table and preaching in church services. In contrast, English is used for most reading and writing. English is also the medium of instruction in schools and is used in business transactions and often, out of politeness, in situations involving interactions with non-Amish. Finally, the Amish read prayers and sing in Standard, or High, German (Hochdeitsch) at church services. The distinctive use of three different languages serves as a powerful conveyor of Amish identity." Although "the English language is being used in more and more situations", nonetheless Pennsylvania Dutch is "one of a handful of minority languages in the United States that is neither endangered nor supported by continual arrivals of immigrants."

Because it is an isolated dialect and almost all native speakers are bilingual in English, the biggest threat to the dialect is gradual decay of the traditional vocabulary, which is then replaced by English loan words or words corrupted from English.

== Speaker population ==
Sectarian speakers of Pennsylvania Dutch in 2015
Group	Population
Amish*	278,805
Old Order Wenger Mennonites	22,610
Old Order Mennonites of Ontario	6,500
Stauffer Mennonites	4,260
Tampico Amish Mennonites	3,260
Hoover Mennonites	1,815
Old Order David Martin Mennonites	1,760
Orthodox Mennonites	1,580
Old Order Reidenbach Mennonites	740
Amish Mennonites (Midwest Beachy)	705
Total	322,035
* Includes all Amish horse and buggy groups except the speakers of Alemannic dialects (Bernese German and Alsatian German).

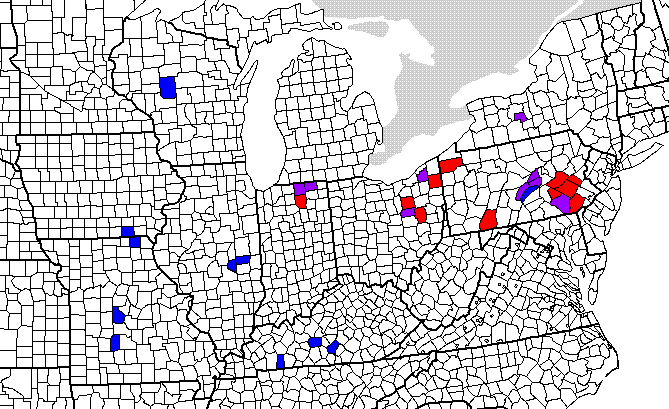
Map showing the U.S. counties with the highest proportion (blue) and highest number (red) of Pennsylvania German speakers as of 2006

In the United States, most Old Order Amish and all "horse and buggy" Old Order Mennonite groups speak Pennsylvania Dutch, except the Old Order Mennonites of Virginia, where German was already mostly replaced at the end of the 19th century. There are several Old Order Amish communities (especially in Indiana) where Bernese German, a form of Swiss German and Low Alemannic Alsatian, not Pennsylvania Dutch, are spoken. Additionally, English has mostly replaced Pennsylvania Dutch among the car driving Old Order Horning and the Wisler Mennonites.

Other religious groups among whose members the Pennsylvania Dutch dialect would have once been predominant, include: Lutheran and German Reformed congregations of Pennsylvania Dutch background, Schwenkfelders, and Schwarzenau (German Baptist) Brethren. Until fairly recent times, the speaking of Pennsylvania Dutch had absolutely no religious connotations.

In Ontario, Canada, the Old Order Amish, the members of the Ontario Old Order Mennonite Conference, the David Martin Old Order Mennonites, the Orthodox Mennonites and smaller pockets of others (regardless of religious affiliation) speak Pennsylvania Dutch. The members of the car driving Old Order Markham-Waterloo Mennonite Conference have mostly switched to English. In 2017, there were about 10,000 speakers of Pennsylvania Dutch in Canada, far fewer than in the United States.

There are also attempts being made in a few communities to teach the dialect in a classroom setting; however, as every year passes by, fewer and fewer in those particular communities speak the dialect. There is still a weekly radio program in the dialect whose audience is made up mostly of the diverse groups, and many Lutheran and Reformed congregations in Pennsylvania that formerly used German have a yearly service in Pennsylvania Dutch. Other non-native speakers of the dialect include those persons that regularly do business with native speakers.

Among them, the Old Order Amish population was probably around 227,000 in 2008. Additionally, the Old Order Mennonite population, a sizable percentage of which is Pennsylvania Dutch-speaking, numbers several tens of thousands. There are also thousands of other Mennonites who speak the dialect, as well as thousands more older Pennsylvania Dutch speakers of non-Amish and non-Mennonite background. The Grundsau Lodge, which is an organization in southeastern Pennsylvania of Pennsylvania Dutch speakers, is said to have 6,000 members. Therefore, a fair estimate of the speaker population in 2008 might be close to 300,000, although many, including some academic publications, may report much lower numbers, uninformed of those diverse speaker groups.

There are no formal statistics on the size of the Amish population, and most who speak Pennsylvania Dutch on the Canadian and U.S. censuses would report that they speak German, since it is the closest option available. Pennsylvania Dutch was reported under ethnicity in the 2000 census.

There are also some Pennsylvania Dutch speakers who belong to traditional Anabaptist groups in Latin America. Even though most Mennonite communities in Belize speak Plautdietsch, some few hundreds who came to Belize mostly around 1970 and who belong to the Noah Hoover Mennonites speak Pennsylvania Dutch. There are also some recent New Order Amish immigrants in Bolivia, Argentina, and Belize who speak Pennsylvania Dutch while the great majority of conservative Mennionites in those countries speak Plautdietsch.

== Examples ==
External videos
- Two YouTube videos
- Die mudder sprooch ('the mother tongue')
- Mei Vadder un Mudder sinn Deitsch ('My father and mother are German') (sung by John Schmid)

- In Mario Pei's book Language, a popular poem in the dialect (with significant English influence in the form of loanwords) is printed; the free-translation is, in the main, by J. Cooper.

Heut is 's xäctly zwanzig Johr
Dass ich bin owwe naus;
Nau bin ich widder lewig z'rück
Und steh am Schulhaus an d'r Krick
Juscht nächst ans Daddy's Haus.

Translation:

Today it's exactly twenty years
Since I went up and away;
Now I am back again, alive,
And stand at the schoolhouse by the creek
Just next to Grandpa's house.

- This link contains an example of spoken Pennsylvania Dutch: Bisht du en Christ gebore? ('Are you born as a Christian?').

== In popular culture ==
Orange is the New Black character Leanne Taylor and family are featured speaking Pennsylvania Dutch in flashbacks showing her Amish background before ending up in prison.

Science-fiction writer Michael Flynn wrote the novella The Forest of Time, depicting an alternate history in which the United States was never established, but each of the Thirteen Colonies went its own way as an independent nation. In that history, Pennsylvania adopted the Pennsylvania Dutch language as its national language and developed into a German-speaking nation, with its own specific culture, very distinct from both its English-speaking neighbors and European Germany.

== Notable authors and translators ==
- Preston Barba
- C. Richard Beam
- John Birmelin
- David B. Brunner
- Solomon DeLong
- Moses Dissinger
- Richard Druckenbrod
- H. L. Fischer
- Arthur D. Graeff
- Ezra Light Grumbine
- Lee Light Grumbine
- Earl C. Haag
- Henry Harbaugh
- Edward Hermany
- Abraham R. Horne
- Harry Hess Reichard
- Clarence G. Reitnauer
- Emmanuel Rondthaler
- G. Gilbert Snyder
- Pierce E. Swope
- William S. Troxell
- Louise Adeline Weitzel
- Michael Werner
- Tobias Witmer
- Louis August Wollenweber
- Astor C. Wuchter
- Thomas C. Zimmerman

== See also ==
- German-Pennsylvanian Association
- Pennsylvania Dutch Country
- Hutterite German
- Languages in the United States
- Wisconsin German
- Texas German
- Kurrent handwriting
- Assabe and Sabina
- Jersey Dutch
- Hunsrik language
