= Emmanuel Rondthaler =

German Moravian minister and poet (1764–1847)

Emmanuel or Emanuel Rondthaler (July 27, 1764 – June 6, 1847) was a distinguished German Moravian minister, educator, and poet, widely recognized as the author of the first published poem in the Pennsylvania German language. Rondthaler's poem, first published as "Abendlied," in Philip Schaff's Deutscher Kirchenfreund in August 1849, is known better as "Morgets und Owets" or "Maryets un Owets (Owetlied)." Rondthaler was a tutor at Nazareth Hall in Nazareth, Pennsylvania from 1832 to 1839. The Abendlied has been published in at least four versions of Pennsylvania German orthography, and in several English translations.

Rondthaler is buried in Nazareth Moravian Cemetery. Earl C. Haag incorrectly identifies his birth year as 1815, but his 1847 burial record indicates that he was "aged 82 years, 10 months, 10 days."
