= Fancy Dutch =

Christian denomination

High-Dutch Hoch-Deutsche
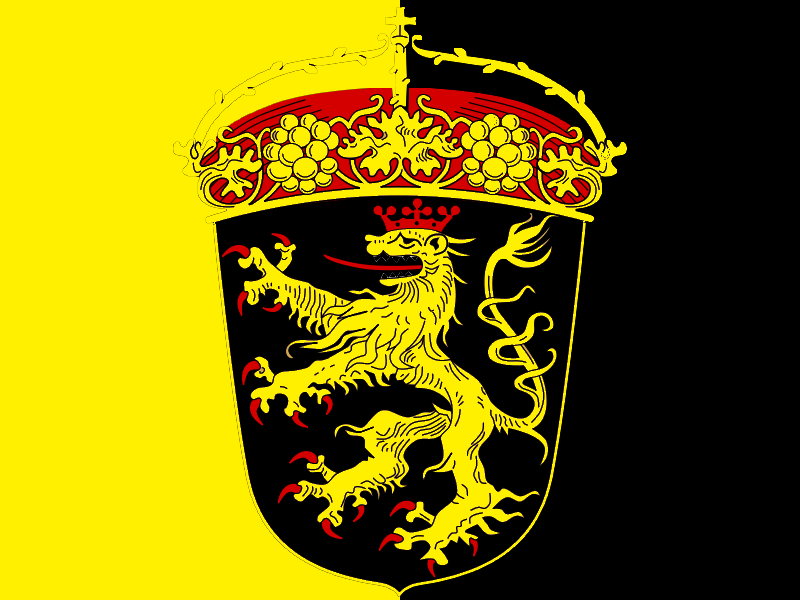
- The High Dutch, descendants of the Palatines

Founder
- The Holy Roman Empire, Rhenish Palatinate

Regions with significant populations
- German Pennsylvania (Germantown, Dutchland), Ohio, Indiana, Maryland Palatinate

Religions
- Roman Catholic, Lutheran, German Reformed

Scriptures
- Latin Vulgate Bible, Luther Bible

Languages
- Pennsylvania Dutch; Pennsylvania Dutch English

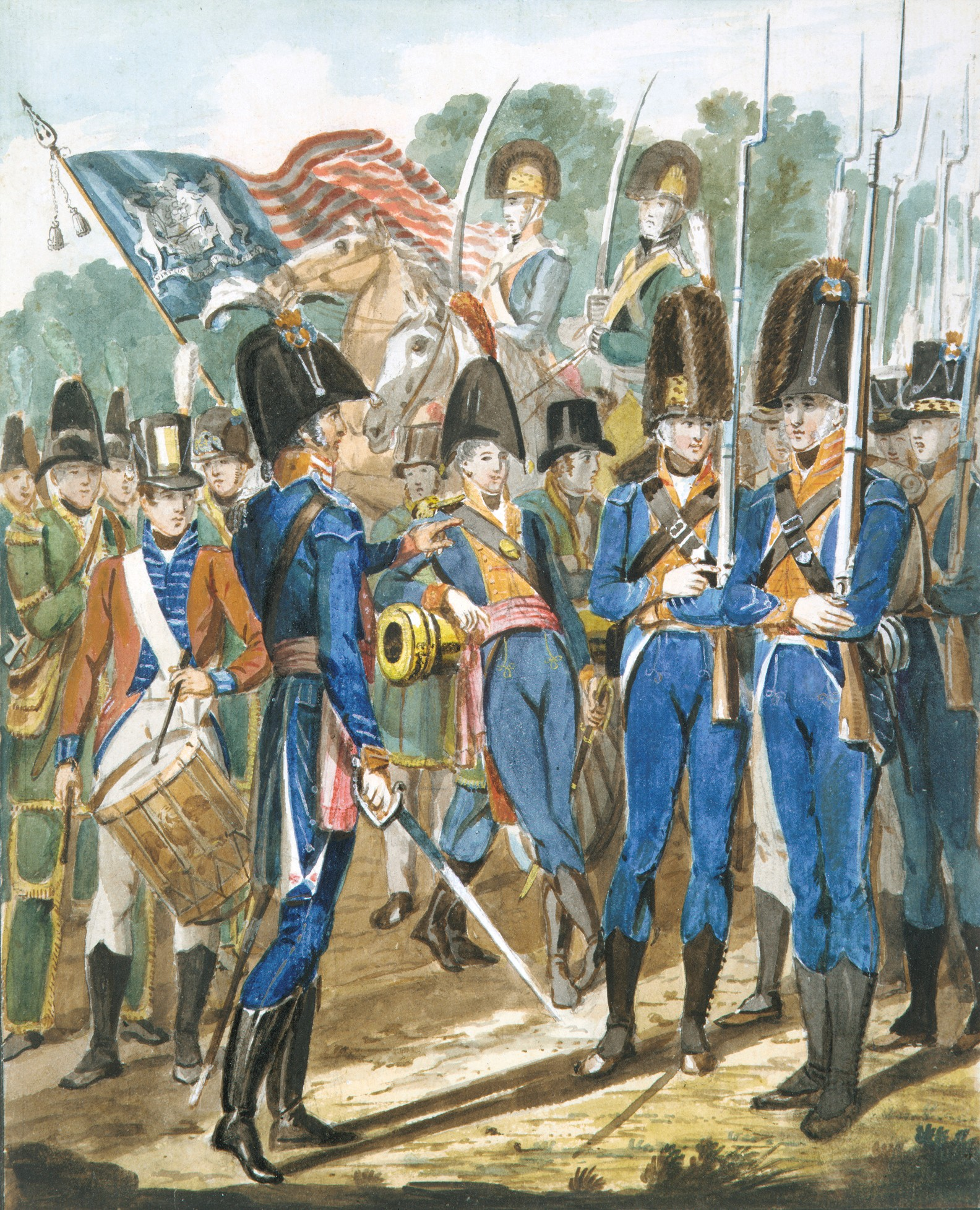
Fancy Dutchmen were soldiers in the Pennsylvania Militia, as depicted in this early 19th century illustration

The Fancy Dutch (German: Hoch-Deutsche), also known as the High-Dutch, and historically as the Pennsylvania High Germans (German: Pennsylvanisch Hoch-Deutsche), are the Pennsylvania Dutch who do not belong to Plain Dutch sects. Unlike the Amish, the conservative Dunkards, or Old Order Mennonites, they do not wear plain clothing, and can fight in wars. Many popularly associated characteristics of Pennsylvania Dutch culture, including spielwerk, hex signs, and other aspects of Pennsylvania Dutch art, music, and folklore, are derived from the Fancy Dutch. The tourism industry and mainstream media often erroneously attribute such contributions to the more conservative Plain Dutch, though they would reject these aspects of their more worldly Fancy counterparts.

For most of the 19th century, the Fancy Dutch far outnumbered the Plain groups among the Pennsylvania Dutch. But since the two World Wars and the subsequent suppression of the German language in the US, as well as socioeconomic trends generally, there was substantial pressure on the Pennsylvania Dutchmen to assimilate. All the while, the Amish population has grown, especially in recent decades.

Today most Pennsylvania Dutch speakers are Plain Dutch, whereas the Fancy Dutch have mostly assimilated into the larger Anglo-American ethnic culture of the United States and no longer present a distinct ethnic separateness. This fact contributes to the widespread misunderstanding in the 21st century whereby the term Pennsylvania Dutch is misinterpreted to be synonymous with the Plain Folk.

While Plain Dutch communities are centered on Lancaster County, Pennsylvania and Holmes County, Ohio, the Fancy Dutch or their descendants live in the countryside surrounding Reading, Allentown, York, and Lebanon. Most of their descendants are now assimilated with the larger Anglo-American culture and speak English principally and often exclusively, no longer speaking the Pennsylvania Dutch language on any daily or fluent basis.

== Religion and Anglo-American prejudice ==
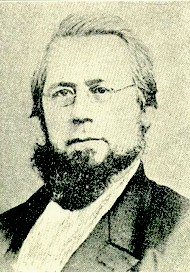
Pennsylvania Fancy Dutch Rev. Henry Harbaugh

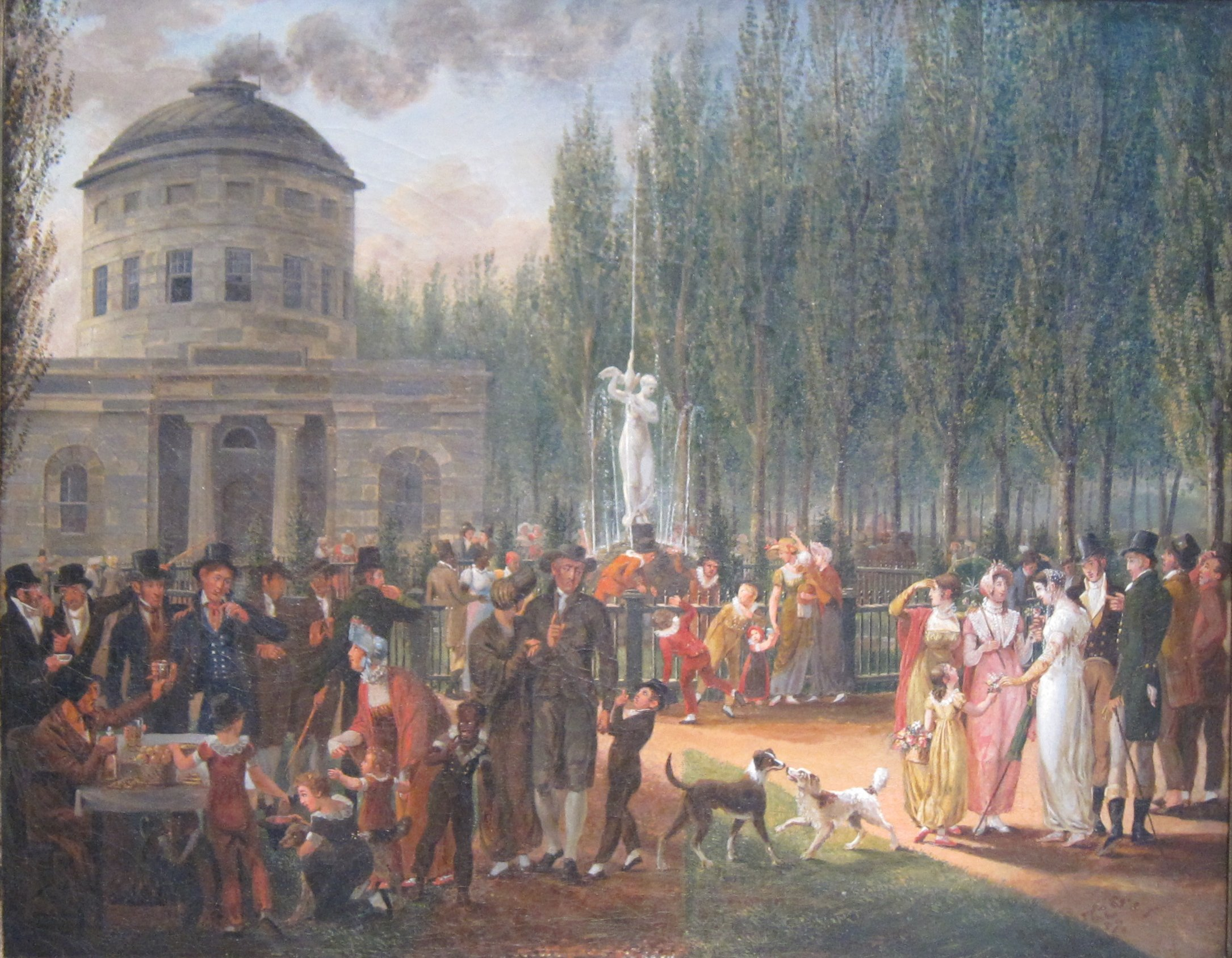
Fourth of July in Pennsylvania

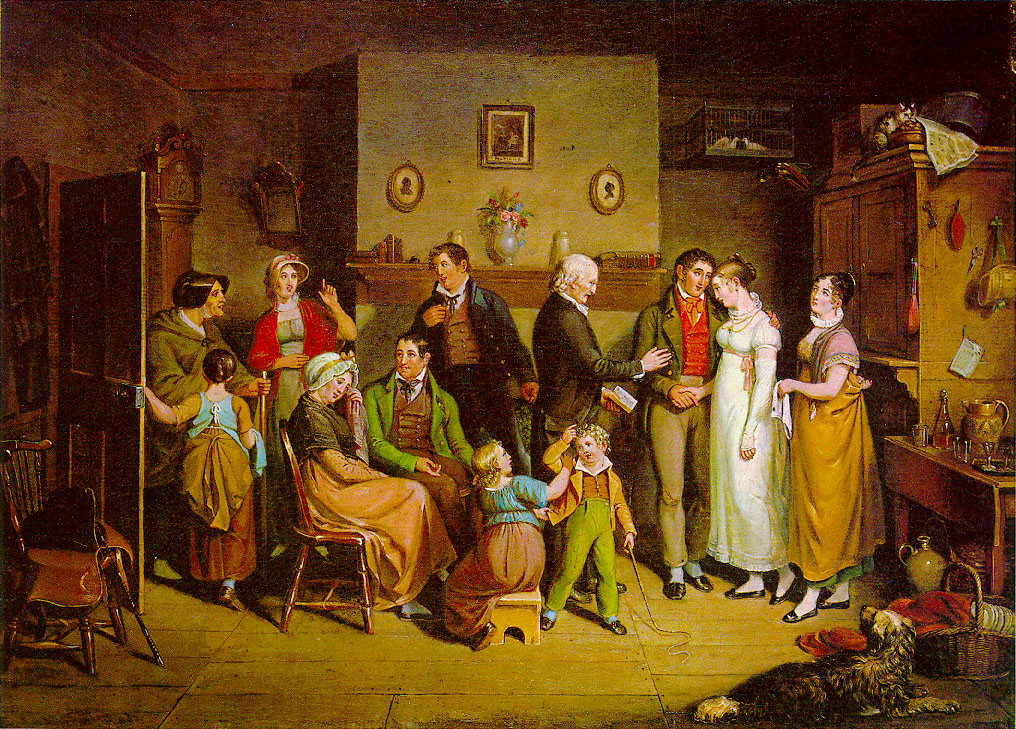
A Fancy Dutch country wedding

As the descendants of Palatines, Fancy Dutch people were mostly from Lutheran and Reformed church congregations (non-sectarians), as well as Roman Catholics. They were therefore often called Church Dutch or Church people, to distinguish them from so-called sectarians (Anabaptist Plain people), along the lines of a high church/low church distinction. The adjectives Fancy and Gay similarly denoted contrast with plain practices, although frugality and unostentatiousness were in fact prevalent among most Church Dutch as well.

Anglo-Americans created the stereotypes of "the stubborn Dutchman" or "the dumb Dutchman", and made Pennsylvania Dutch the butt of ethnic jokes in the 18th, 19th, and 20th centuries, though these stereotypes were never specific to the Plain Folk; most of the Pennsylvania Dutch people in those centuries were Church people. The prejudice is now mostly a fossil of the past, the subject of consciously clichéd jokes rather than true spite or discord ("laughing with rather than laughing at"), now that assimilation is widespread. Just as Fancy Dutch or their descendants no longer speak the Pennsylvania Dutch language with any regularity (or at all, in many cases), they are not necessarily religious anymore, meaning that calling them "Church Dutch" is no longer particularly apt, although even among those that no longer regularly attend any church, many remain cultural Christians.

== Society ==
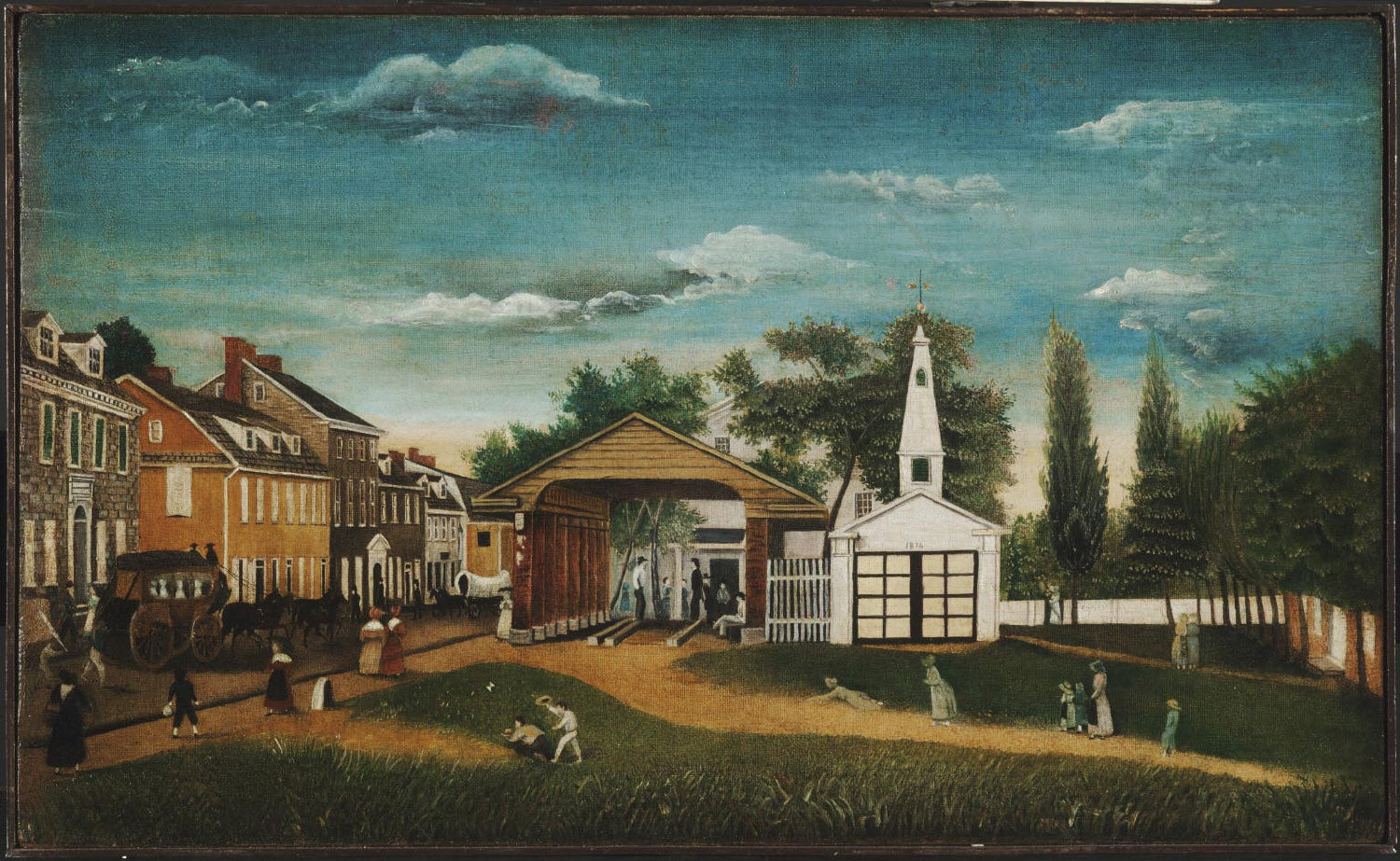
Germantown, Pennsylvania, 1820

The Pennsylvania Dutch came to control much of the best agricultural lands in all of the Pennsylvania Commonwealth. They ran many newspapers, and out of six newspapers in Pennsylvania, three were in German, two were in English and one was in both languages. They also maintained their Germanic architecture when they founded new towns in Pennsylvania.

Pennsylvania Dutchmen already possessed an ethnic identity and a well-defined social-system that was separate from the Anglo-American identity. Their Anglo-American neighbors described them as very industrious, very businessminded, and a very rich community.

Here is a conversation of two businessmen describing Germantown, the capital of Pennsylvania Dutch urban culture in 1854:

The Chairman: "How important is Germantown?"

Mr Hasten: "It is a very rich community and is the finest district around Philadelphia. The highest class of people that can be served in such a community, probably of the whole American Union, is a resident in Germantown. It is a distinctly separate city."

The Pennsylvania Dutch had a strong dislike for New England, and to them the term "Yankee" became synonymous with "a cheat." Indeed, New Englanders were the rivals of the Pennsylvania Dutch.

=== Black Dutch ===
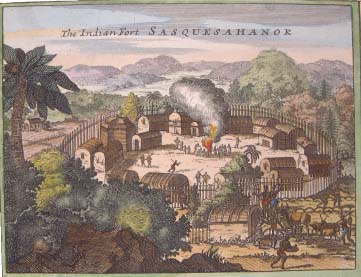
An illustration of a Susquehannock village (1671)

Some Black and indigenous people in North America have historically identified with Pennsylvania Dutch culture, with many of the Pennsylvania Dutch diaspora being Melungeons who referred to themselves as "Black Dutch". In the Province of Pennsylvania, Palatines lived between Haudenosaunee settlements and the two peoples "communicated, drank, worked, worshipped and traded together, negotiated over land use and borders, and conducted their diplomacy separate from the colonial governments". Some Palatines learned to perform the Haudenosaunee condolence ceremony, where condolences were offered to those whose friends and family had died, which was the most important of all Haudenosaunee rituals. The Canadian historian James Paxton wrote the Palatines and Haudenosaunee "visited each other's homes, conducted small-scale trade and socialized in taverns and trading posts".

Relations between the Palatine Dutch and Indians were sometimes friendly. The descendants of the Palatine Dutch and Indians were known as Black Dutch. However, according to the National Park Service, relations were not always friendly because the Palatine settlers were in many instances "cheating the Indians in much the same way the Palatines had been cheated by the English". Black Dutchmen of the Pennsylvania Dutch Country spoke Pennsylvania Dutch and followed Fancy Dutch traditions.

Slaves living within Pennsylvania lands also learned the Pennsylvania Dutch language; slavery sharply declined after the emancipation act of 1780, creating a free Black Dutch population. Slavery was finally abolished from the Commonwealth's law in 1847. In Canada, an 1851 census shows many Black people and Mennonites lived near each other in a number of places and exchanged labor, or the Dutch would hire Black laborers. There are accounts of Black families providing child care assistance for their Dutch neighbors. These Pennsylvania Dutch were usually Plain Dutch Mennonites or Fancy Dutch Lutherans. The black-Mennonite relationship in Canada soon evolved to the level of church membership.

== See also ==
- Plain people
