= Clarence G. Reitnauer =

American journalist

Clarence George Reitnauer (November 12, 1900 — April 5, 1989) was an American German Reformed layman and prominent author in the Pennsylvania German language. His dialect pseudonym was Der Shdivvel Knecht or Der Schtiwwelgnecht, and he wrote for the Pennsburg Town and Country newspaper as a columnist beginning on October 6, 1966. He was a cabinetmaker and carpenter by trade, working for the Allen Organ Company. He was also a talented illustrator and amateur printer, popular for his Pennsylvania German-themed Christmas cards. Reitnauer was a frequent preacher at church services in the Pennsylvania German dialect and a speaker at Fersommling gatherings, as well as an actor with Die Deitsche Leit Schpieler of Huff's Church, Alburtis. He was the Seisholtzville correspondent for Allentown newspapers for 30 years.

Reitnauer died in Macungie, Pennsylvania and is buried in the Rauch Hertzog Cemetery in Berks County, Pennsylvania.

== Bibliography ==
- (illustrator) Pennsylvania Dutch Almanac Beliefs: Printed in Conjunction with the Pennsylvania Dutch Folk Festival Which Is Held Annually at Kutztown, Pa. (1968)
- So Shreibt der Shdivvel Knecht (1975)
- Em Shdivvel Knecht Sei Werdta Buch (1976)
- Earl C. Haag, A Pennsylvania German Anthology (1988) ISBN 9780941664295
