= Tobias Witmer =

American inventor and linguist

Tobias Witmer (October 8, 1816 – August 14, 1897) was an American inventor, spelling reformer, civil engineer, and a notable poet in the Pennsylvania Dutch language. He was also one of the most well known surveyors of the Niagara County, New York region. His inventions included a bicycle wheel made from the wires of an old hoop skirt; a corn sheller; and an automatic railroad switch. For a time, he was a schoolteacher and was one of the founders of the Williamsville Classical Institute, later known as the Williamsville Academy.

Witmer's Pennsylvania German poetry was anthologized by Abraham R. Horne, Edward H. Rauch and Edward C. Haag.

He and his twin brother were born in Niagara Falls, New York to a family from Lancaster County, Pennsylvania. He died in Williamsville, New York.

Witmer's poetry in Pennsylvania German received interest in the 1940s as dialect scholar-publisher Preston A. Barba republished a number of his poems and a brief biographical exploration.

== Bibliography ==
- T. Witmer's patent musical scale, shewing the transpositions of the scale by sharps and flats for the use of singing school teachers (1857)
- A system of phonetic spelling adapted to English and German
- Witmer's phonetic orthography (1880)
- Witmer'z fonografik charts (1881)

== Representative poems ==
- Die Freschlin (1948)
- Deer Himml uff Eerda (published 1948)
- Sechs Uhr (published 1948)
- Der Schnee (published 1949)
