= Astor C. Wuchter =

Astor Clinton Wuchter (February 4, 1856 — August 24, 1933) was an American Lutheran pastor and author in the Pennsylvania German language. Born in Jacksonville, Pennsylvania, he was graduated from the Millersville State Normal School and taught in public schools from 1874 to 1878. He was ordained in 1885 after studies at the Lutheran Theological Seminary at Philadelphia. Wuchter was pastor of Lutheran churches in Pennsylvania and Ohio, and made extensive contributions of Pennsylvania German poetry to the Allentown Democrat newspaper. He was also a prolific author of hymns and poems in English and standard modern German, and taught French and German at Wittenberg College in Springfield, Ohio. Earl Haag incorrectly identifies Wuchter as having died in 1922.

== Bibliography ==
- Earl C. Haag, A Pennsylvania German Anthology (1988) ISBN 9780941664295
