= Edward Hermany =

American poet (1832–1896)

Edward Hermany (December 23, 1832 – July 24, 1896) was an American poet who wrote in both English and the Pennsylvania Dutch language. He was born and died in Lynn Township, Pennsylvania. Edward Hermany's brother was the engineer and architect Charles Hermany.

Hermany's English-language manuscripts are in the collections of the Lehigh County Historical Society. His unpublished manuscripts in Pennsylvania German are at Muhlenberg College.

== Poems ==
- Vun der Aern
- 'S Barwelche
- Der Budscher Wiggle
- Eckenroth
- Vun de Hoiyet
- Vum Lattwaerrick Koche
- Es Waerd Ewwe So Sei Solle
- Varnehaer
- Wea Di Ollda Noach dr "Hyo" Sin (1910)

== Sources ==
- Harry Hess Reichard, Pennsylvania-German Dialect Writings and Their Writers: a paper prepared at the request of the Pennsylvania-German Society (1918)
- Preston Barba, "Edward Hermany: A Pennsylvania German Poet," Proceedings of the Lehigh County Historical Society, v. 22 (1958)
- Earl C. Haag, A Pennsylvania German Anthology (1988) ISBN 9780941664295
- “Edward Hermany, 1832-1896, a Pennsylvania German Poet,” Journal of the Center for Pennsylvania German Studies, vol. 4, no. 1, Winter 1997, pp. 4-8.
