= C. Richard Beam =

Charles Richard Beam (February 15, 1925—January 26, 2018) was a major figure in twentieth-century Pennsylvania German linguistics, folklore studies, and social history who wrote under the pen-name Es Bischli-Gnippli (Little Clodhopper). He was born in Lancaster County, Pennsylvania, and received his doctorate in German at the University of Pennsylvania (Ph.D. 1970).

Beam wrote newspaper columns in the Pennsylvania German dialect for over fifty years, and also hosted radio broadcasts in Pennsylvania German from 1971 until 2013.

A member of the Evangelical Lutheran Church in America, Beam also belonged to the Pennsylvania German Society and a large number of German-American and Pennsylvania local history organizations.

== Works ==
- An Abridged Pennsylvania German Dictionary (1970)
- (with Jennifer Trout) The Comprehensive Pennsylvania German Dictionary (2004-2012)
- William Keel and C. Richard Beam, editors, The Language and Culture of the Pennsylvania Germans: a Festschrift for Earl C. Haag (2010)

== See also ==
- Preston Barba
- Pennsylvania German Society
