= John Birmelin =

American poet

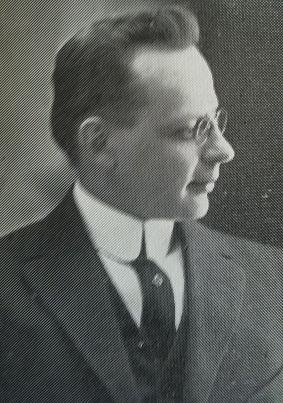
- Birmelin in June 1913
- Born: October 31, 1873; Longswamp Township, Pennsylvania, U.S.
- Died: September 3, 1950 (aged 76); Allentown, Pennsylvania, U.S.
- Occupations: Poet, writer, musician

John Birmelin (October 31, 1873 – September 3, 1950) has been called the Poet Laureate of the Pennsylvania Dutch and is one of the most popular poets and playwrights in the Pennsylvania German language.

== Early life and education ==
Birmelin was born in Longswamp Township, Pennsylvania to a Pennsylvania German mother and a German father who was a native of Grand Duchy of Baden. Birmelin studied music at a young age. By the age of 11, he was an organist in the local church where his father was a member of the choir.

== Career ==
In 1896, Birmelin relocated to Allentown, Pennsylvania.

In 1901, he accepted a job as the organist and choirmaster of Allentown's Sacred Heart of Jesus Church, a position he held until his retirement only weeks before his death in 1950. His successor as organist and choirmaster at Sacred Heart was Karl Buesgen, Birmelin's student and noted Pennsylvania impressionist landscape painter. Birmelin was also the first music teacher at Allentown Central Catholic High School, a position he held from 1926 to 1936.

=== Author ===
Although he wrote some poetry and verse as a young child, Birmelin did not begin writing again until later in life. In the early 1930s, Birmelin's poetry was included as part of "'S Pennsylvaanisch Deitsch Eck" ("The Pennsylvania Dutch Corner") column in The Morning Call, where he authored 62 of the first 100 published columns.

Birmelin's most commercially successful work was Mammi Gans: The Dialect Nursery Rhymes of John Birmelin, a Pennsylvania German translation of many of the Mother Goose nursery rhymes. Birmelin's poetry often dealt with aspects of Pennsylvania German life and history. "Gwendeltee", one of his earliest works, is a poem about a beautiful Pennsylvania German girl on a farm. "Regina Hartmann" tells about the return of a Pennsylvania German girl taken prisoner during the French and Indian War. "Der Laaf Kaaf" pertains to the Walking Purchase.

Birmelin's Pennsylvania German translation of the song "My Country, 'Tis of Thee" continues to be sung at Fersommling and other Pennsylvania German events:

Mei Land, ich sing von dir,
Siess iss die Freiheet mir,
Do will ich sei;
So wie die alde Leit,
So fiehl ich aa noch heit,
Bin dir zu yedre Zeit
Immer gedrei.

An Felsebaerrye naus,
Iwwer die Wolke drauss,
Ring Freiheetsklang!
Winters im diefe Schnee,
Summers wann's Feld mit Glee,
O Land, wie bischt du schee,
Kling Freiheets Gsang!

Unsrer Voreldre Gott,
Fiehr uns in yedre Not,
An deinre Hand!
So lang mir dir gedrei,
Bleibt des Land gross un frei;
Du sollscht uns Keenich sei,
Schutz unserm Land.

== Legacy ==
According to Homer Tope Rosenberger, Birmelin "had the power to write compelling poetry in the dialect that makes one sad, or joyous, pensive, or reminiscent" and that Birmelin's poetry had "a special quality because he weighed carefully the sound of dialect words. Birmelin's poetry dealt with Pennsylvania German issues and life, "sometimes humorously and other times in serious vein" and he "wrote in the dialect with dignity, but with a warmth that went to the heart."

== Bibliography ==
=== Plays ===
- Der Gnopp
- M Dr. Fogel sei Office Schtunn

=== Poems ===
- "'S Alder un der Dot"
- "Buchschtaaweschpielerei"
- "Celia von Berneville"
- "Gwendeltee"
- "Gezwitscher"
- "Der Laaf Kaaf"
- "Regina Hartmann"

=== Translations into Pennsylvania German ===
- Mammi Gans: The Dialect Nursery Rhymes of John Birmelin, a collection of Mother Goose rhymes
- "My Country, 'Tis of Thee" ("America")
- Robert Louis Stevenson's A Child's Garden of Verses

=== Collections and anthologies ===
- Poems in "'S Pennsylvaanisch Deitsch Eck" ("The Pennsylvania Dutch Corner") column in The Morning Call
- Gezwitscher (collection of poems, published in 1938 as part of the yearbook of the Pennsylvania German Folklore Society)
- Later Poems of John Birmelin (published 1951)

== Resources ==
- Barba, Preston A. Introduction to Gezwitscher. The Pennsylvania German Society, III. Allentown, Pennsylvania, 1938.
- Buffington, Albert F. (ed). The Reichard Collection of Early Pennsylvania German Plays. Lancaster, Pennsylvania: Pennsylvania German Society, 1962. Pages 398–439.
- Haag, Earl C. A Pennsylvania German Anthology. Selinsgrove, Pennsylvania: Susquehanna University Press, 1988. ISBN 9780945636007
- Rosenberger, Homer Tope. The Pennsylvania Germans, 1891-1965. Lancaster, Pennsylvania: Pennsylvania German Society, 1966. Pages 215–217.
