= Henry Harbaugh =

Clergyman

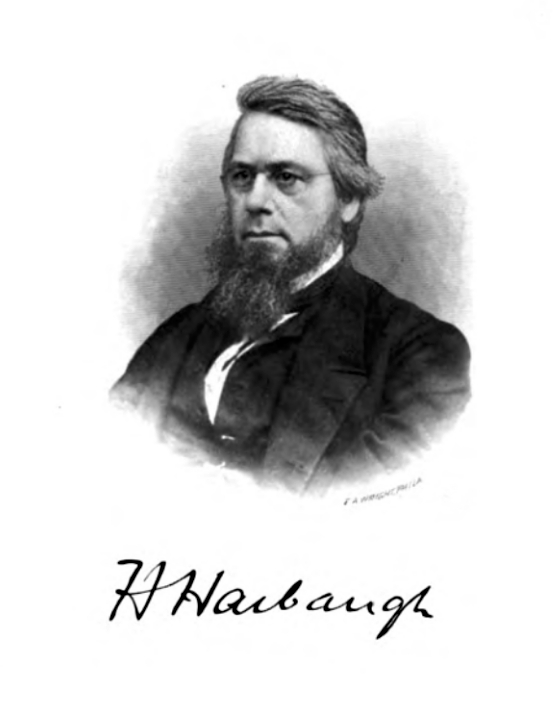
Harbaugh, c. 1900

Henry Harbaugh (October 28, 1817, near Waynesboro, Pennsylvania - December 28, 1867 in Mercersburg, Pennsylvania) was a Pennsylvania Dutch clergyman of the German Reformed Church.

== Biography ==
He taught to obtain means to enter college, and studied at Mercersburg, Pennsylvania, but was unable to finish either a classical or theological course. He was ordained in 1843, and installed as pastor of the German Reformed Church at Lewisburg, Pennsylvania, and in 1850 accepted a call to the church at Lancaster, Pennsylvania, where he remained until he moved to Lebanon, Pennsylvania, in 1860.

In 1863, he was appointed by his synod professor of theology at the Mercersburg Seminary. He occupied this chair until his death, which was occasioned by undue mental exertion.

He was one of the exponents of the Mercersburg Theology.

== Works ==
He published some poems in Pennsylvania Dutch, and also wrote:

- Heaven, or the Sainted Dead (3 vols., 1843–53)
- Heavenly Recognition (1851)
- The Heavenly Home (1853)
- Union with the Church (1853)
- Birds of the Bible (1854)
- Life of Rev. Richard Schlatter (1857)
- The Fathers of the German Reformed Church (1858)
- The True Glory of Woman, and a Plea for the Lord's Portion of a Christian's Wealth (1860)
- The Golden Censer (1860)
- Hymns and Chants (Lebanon, 1861)
- Christological Theology (Philadelphia, 1864)

He compiled numerous church almanacs, edited The Child's Treasury, and contributed a great number of sketches to the German Reformed Church "Cyclopaedia." From 1850 to 1866 he was the editor of the Guardian, a monthly magazine which he founded. Later he was editor of the Mercersburg Review and was on the staff of the Reformed Church Messenger.
