= John Schmid =

American singer-songwriter

John Schmid (born 1949) is an American country and folk singer and songwriter who is popular among the Amish and Old Order Mennonites. He sings songs both in English and in Pennsylvania German. He is especially popular in the Holmes/Wayne Amish settlement in Ohio where he lives. He may be the "only man ever to write songs in Deitsh".

He is not a native speaker of Pennsylvania German, but learned it at a young age from classmates. According to Ira Wagler, author of the best selling book "Growing Up Amish", he speaks "flawless PA Dutch". He grew up north of Fredericksburg, Ohio in a not very religious family, but as a young adult he became a Christian.

Soon after their wedding in 1980 John and his wife Lydia moved to Costa Rica working as teachers and hosting a house for visiting missionaries. He also was a youth minister in association with Latin America Mission and later, Young Life. In 1990 music became a full-time calling for him. In the beginning he did mostly prison-ministry journeys with his songs. According to his website, "In a typical year, John ministers in more than 50 prisons, 30 churches, four to five camps, six evangelistic crusades, 40 banquets, a street fair or two, several weekend seminars, as well as numerous concerts and living rooms," particularly in Ohio, Indiana, and Florida.

He has recorded 24 CDs, three of them entirely in Pennsylvania German. He sings popular Pennsylvania German songs like "Mei Vadder un Mudder sinn Deitsch" and "Schnitzelbank". He is an admirer of Johnny Cash and has sung many of his songs.

He lives with his wife Lydia in Berlin, Ohio and has three grown children.

== Literature ==
- Denice Rovira Hazlett: John Schmid - Finding Common Ground through Uncommon Kindness in Just Plain Values, pages 6–24, September 2014.
