= Lee Light Grumbine =

American lawyer, local historian, Pennsylvania German writer

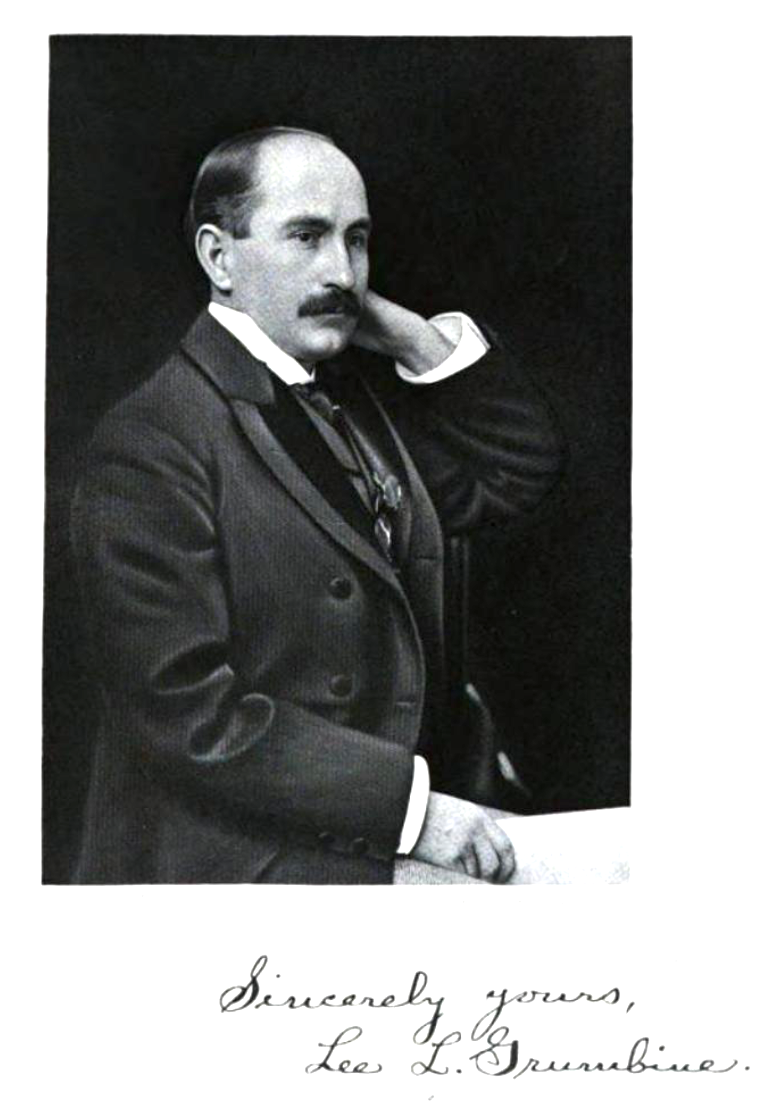
Ezra L. Grumbine

Lee Light Grumbine (July 25, 1858 - August 18, 1904) was an American attorney, local historian, and published columnist and poet in the Pennsylvania German language. His dialect pseudonym was "Der Old Schulmashter."

Grumbine was born in Fredericksburg, Pennsylvania and died in Lebanon, Pennsylvania. A graduate of Wesleyan University in Middletown, Connecticut, he was active in the Temperance Movement, and a founding office-holder in the Pennsylvania German Society. In 1889 he became editor of the Lebanon Daily Report newspaper. He notably translated the Rime of the Ancient Mariner by Samuel Taylor Coleridge into Pennsylvania German.

== Bibliography ==
- The Marriage of the Muse (1892)
- Der Alt Dengelstock: En Gedicht nach der Pennsylvanish-Deutscher Mundart (1898)
- The Origin and Significance of Our Township Names (1899)
- The Pennsylvania-German Dialect: A Study of Its Status as a Spoken Dialect and Form of Literary Expression, with Reference to Its Capabilities, and Limitations, and Lines Illustrating Same (1902)
- Der Dengelstock and other Poems and Translations in the Pennsylvania-German Dialect (1903)

== See also ==
- Ezra Light Grumbine, brother, also a Pennsylvania German author
