= Abraham R. Horne =

Abraham Reasor Horne (middle name also Reeser or Reaser, March 24, 1834 — December 23, 1902) was a prominent American Lutheran pastor, botanist, publisher, and Pennsylvania German writer.

Horne was born in Springfield Township, Bucks County, Pennsylvania. He was ordained in 1859 after a teaching career in Bethlehem and Bucks County. He founded The National Educator newspaper in 1860 and served as its publisher and editor until his death in 1902.

Horne received an honorary doctor of divinity degree from Lebanon Valley College in 1881. He is buried at Fairview Cemetery in Allentown.

== Bibliography ==
- Pennsylvania German Manual for Pronouncing, Speaking and Writing English (1875, 1896 edition)
- Easy Experiments for Schools and Families (1886)
- Das Leben und Wirken von Vater Josua Jäger: Evangelisch-Lutherischen Prediger (1889)
- Common Sense Health Notes (1893)
- Horne's Pennsylvania German Manual: How Pennsylvania German Is Spoken and Written, for Pronouncing, Speaking and Writing English (1910)
