= Pennsylvania Dutch =

Ethnic group of the eastern United States

Pennsylvanisch Deitsche (Pennsylvania German)

Regions with significant populations
- German Pennsylvania; Ohio, Indiana, Maryland, Virginia, New York, North Carolina, West Virginia, California, Ontario

Languages
- Pennsylvania Dutch; Pennsylvania Dutch English

Religion
- Lutheran, Reformed, German Reformed, Catholic, Moravian, Church of the Brethren, Mennonite, Amish, Schwenkfelder, River Brethren, Yorker Brethren, Judaism, Pow-wow, Jehovah's Witnesses

Related ethnic groups
- German Americans, Palatines, Ohio Rhinelanders, Fancy Dutch, Missouri Rhinelanders, Maryland Palatines

The Pennsylvania Dutch (Pennsylvania German: Pennsylvanisch Deitsche), also referred to as Pennsylvania Germans, are an ethnic group in Pennsylvania, United States, and Ontario, Canada, as well as in other regions of both nations. They largely originate from the Palatinate region of Germany, and settled in Pennsylvania during the 17th, 18th, and 19th centuries. While most were from the Palatinate region, a smaller number were from other regions of Germany and German-speaking areas of Europe, including Baden-Württemberg, Hesse, Saxony, and Rhineland in Germany, Switzerland, and the Alsace–Lorraine region of France. They have nothing to do with the "Dutch" in the sense of people from the Netherlands.

The Pennsylvania Dutch are either monolingual English speakers or bilingual speakers of both English and the Pennsylvania Dutch language, which is also commonly referred to as Pennsylvania German. Linguistically it consists of a mix of German dialects which have been significantly influenced by English, primarily in terms of vocabulary but also in grammar and pronunciation. Based on dialect features, Pennsylvania Dutch can be classified as a variety of Rhine Franconian, with the Palatine German dialects being most closely related.

Geographically, Pennsylvania Dutch are largely found in the Pennsylvania Dutch Country, Ohio Amish Country, and Indiana Amish Country. The main division among Pennsylvania Dutch is that between sectarians (those belonging to the Old Order Mennonite, Amish or related groups) and nonsectarians, sometimes colloquially referred to as ″Church Dutch″ or ″Fancy Dutch″.

Notable Americans of Pennsylvania Dutch descent include Henry J. Heinz (founder of the Heinz food conglomerate), Walter Chrysler (founder of automobile manufacturer Chrysler), U.S. President Dwight D. Eisenhower, and Meghan, Duchess of Sussex.

== Autonym ==
Differing explanations exist on why the Pennsylvania Dutch are referred to as Dutch, which typically refers to the inhabitants of the Netherlands or the Dutch language. Some authors consider the word Dutch in Pennsylvania Dutch, which in medieval times could also be used to refer to speakers of various German dialects, to be an archaism specific to 19th-century American English, particularly in its colloquial form. Other scholars contend that the Dutch in Pennsylvania Dutch is an anglicization of the Pennsylvania German autonym deitsch, which in the Pennsylvania German language refers to the Pennsylvania Dutch or Germans in general.

The migration of the Pennsylvania Dutch to the United States predates the emergence of a distinct German national identity, which did not form until the late 18th century. The formation of the German Empire in 1871 resulted in a semantic shift, in which deutsch was no longer principally a linguistic and cultural term, but was increasingly used to describe all things related to Germany and its inhabitants. This development did not go unnoticed among the Pennsylvania Dutch who, in the 19th and early 20th century, referred to themselves as Deitsche, while calling newer German immigrants Deitschlenner lit. 'Germany-ers'.

== Geographic distribution ==
The Pennsylvania Dutch live primarily in the Delaware Valley and in the Pennsylvania Dutch Country, a large area that includes South Central Pennsylvania, in the area stretching in an arc from Bethlehem and Allentown in the Lehigh Valley westward through Reading, Lebanon, and Lancaster to York and Chambersburg. Smaller enclaves include Pennsylvania Dutch-speaking areas in New York, Delaware, Maryland, Ohio, West Virginia, North Carolina, Indiana, Illinois, Wisconsin, Virginia, and the Canadian province of Ontario.

== History ==
=== Immigration to America ===
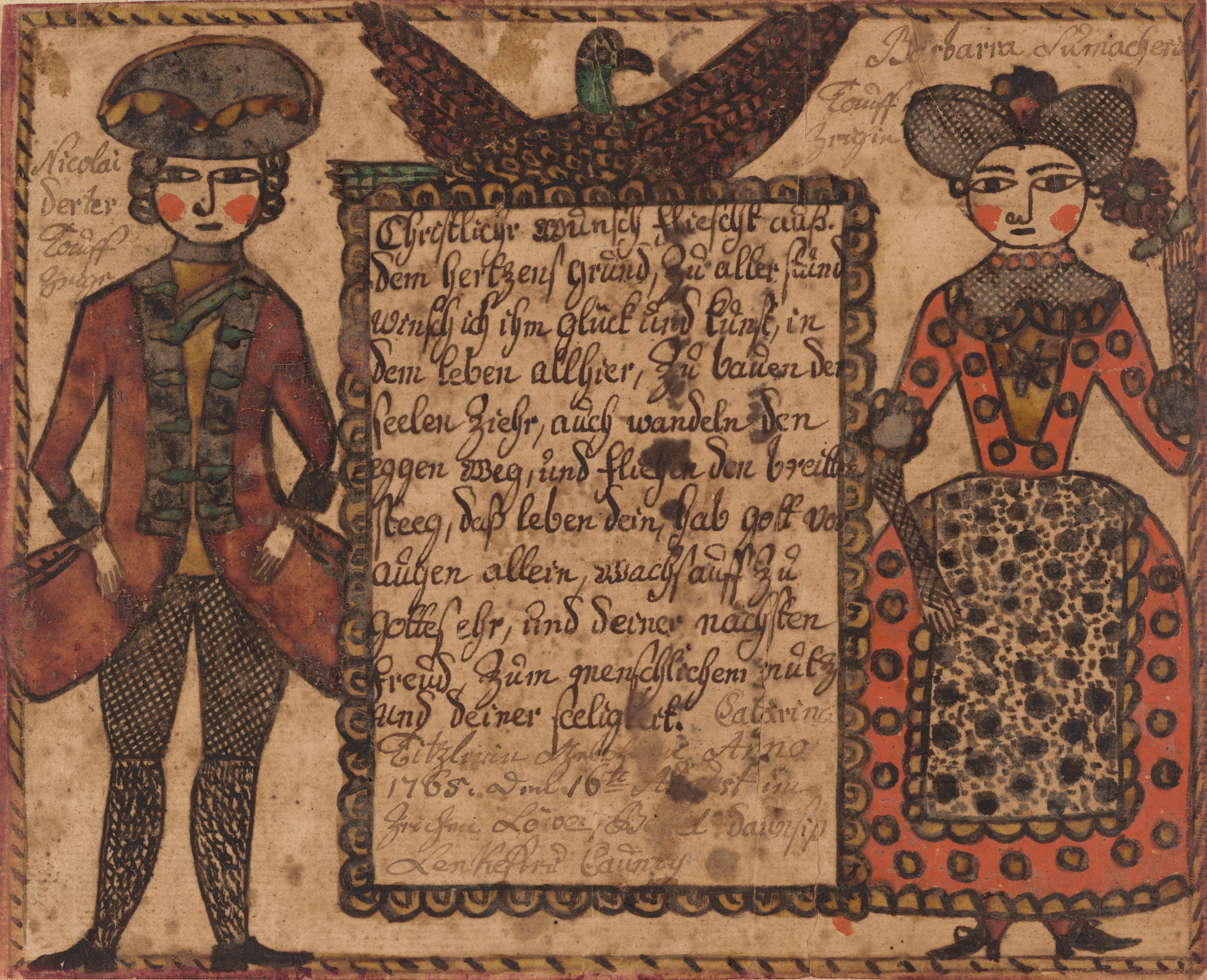
A portrayal of colonial era Palatines in Fraktur art style

The Pennsylvania Dutch, primarily German-speaking immigrants from Germany, especially the Palatinate region, Switzerland, and Alsace, moved to America seeking better opportunities and a safer, more tolerant environment. Many, including Amish and Mennonites, faced religious persecution in Europe. Pennsylvania, established by William Penn as a haven for religious minorities, promised the religious freedom they sought. Economic hardship, marked by war, famine, and limited land access in 17th and 18th century Germany, pushed many to seek a better life in the New World, which offered abundant land and resources.

Europe's, and especially Germany's, political instability, with frequent wars like the devastating Thirty Years' War, contrasted with the relatively stable environment of the American colonies. The availability of fertile land was a significant draw for the immigrants, who were mainly farmers and craftsmen, for whom the chance to own and cultivate their own farms was highly appealing. Positive reports from early settlers as well as active recruitment by William Penn encouraged friends and family to join them, fostering tightly-knit communities.

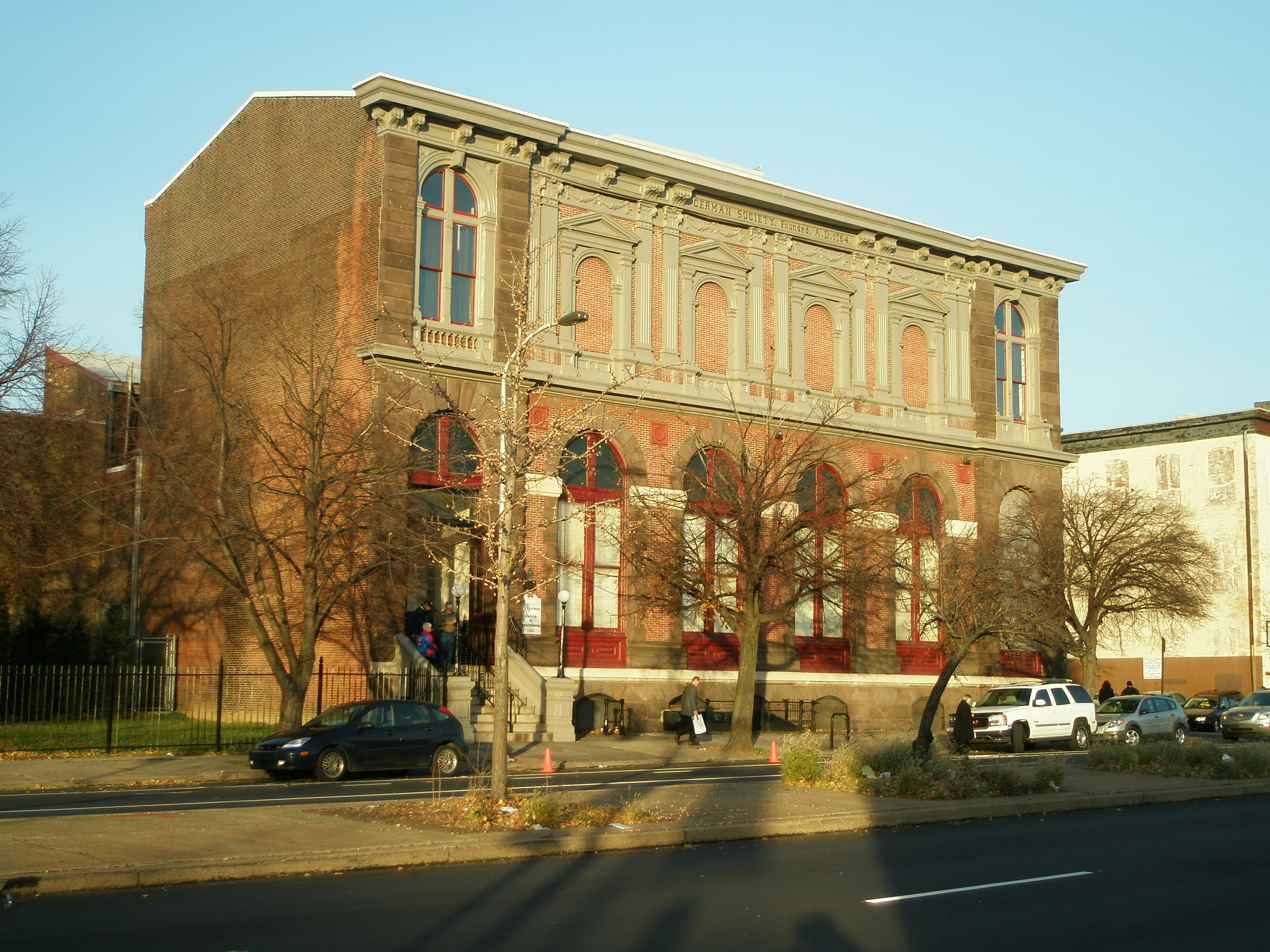
Pennsylvania German society was founded to protect Palatine indentured servants, redemptioners

About three fourths of all Germans in Pennsylvania were subject to several years of indentured servitude contracts. These indentured servants, known as redemptioners, were made to work on plantations or perform other work to pay off the costs of the sponsor or shipping company which had advanced the cost of their transatlantic voyage. In 1764, the German Society of Pennsylvania was founded to protect the German redemptioners.

The bulk of German migration to the American colonies began in 1683 but concentrated on the first half of the 18th century. Overall, the historian Marianne Wokeck estimates that just under 81,000 German-speakers entered the port of Philadelphia between 1683 and 1775, with two thirds of the immigrants arriving before 1755 of whom the majority (ca. 35,000) arrived in the five year period between 1749 and 1754. In 1790, ethnic Germans comprised 38% of the population of Pennsylvania, or approximately 165,000 people. Of these, over half resided in the counties of Berks, Lancaster, Northampton and York.

Anglo-Americans held much anti-Palatine sentiment in the colonial-era Province of Pennsylvania. In 1751, Benjamin Franklin complained about Palatine refugees in his work Observations Concerning the Increase of Mankind, writing:

Why should the Palatine boors be suffered to swarm into our settlements, and by herding together establish their language and manners to the exclusion of ours? Why should Pennsylvania, founded by the English, become a colony of aliens, who will shortly be so numerous as to Germanize us instead of us Anglifying them, and will never adopt our language or customs, any more than they can acquire our complexion.

The Germans who immigrated to the United States saw themselves as related though distinct from later (post-1830) waves of German-speaking immigrants. The Pennsylvania Dutch referred to themselves as Deitsche and would refer to Germans who arrived after the period of almost non-existent emigration between 1760 and 1830 from the German lands as Deitschlenner, literally "Germany-ers", compare German: Deutschländer.

=== American Revolutionary War ===
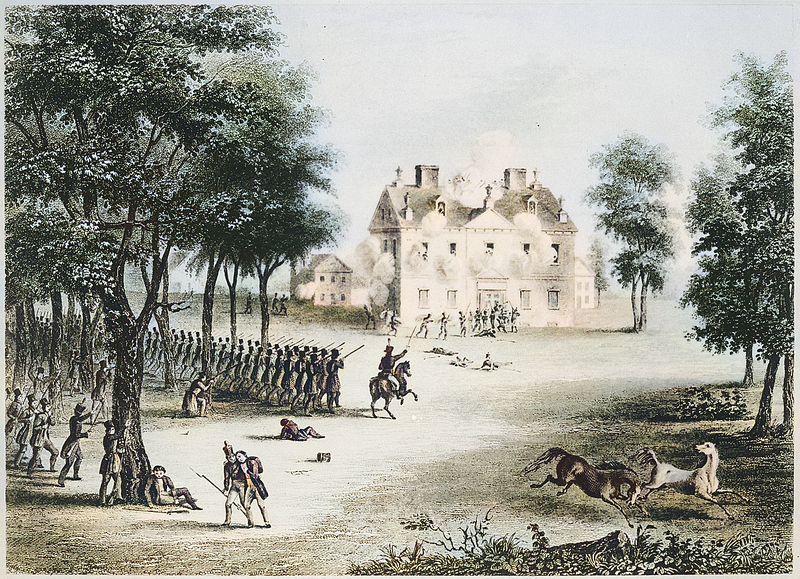
In the Battle of Germantown in 1777, Pennsylvania Dutch soldiers fought in the Pennsylvania Militia.

Nicholas Herkimer at the Battle of Oriskany in 1777

The Pennsylvania Dutch composed nearly half of the population of the Province of Pennsylvania. The Fancy Dutch population generally supported the Patriot cause in the American Revolution; the nonviolent Plain Dutch minority did not fight in the war. Heinrich Miller of the Holy Roman Principality of Waldeck (1702-1782), was a journalist and printer based in Philadelphia, and published an early German translation of the Declaration of Independence (1776) in his newspaper Philadelphische Staatsbote. Miller, having Swiss ancestry, often wrote about Swiss history and myth, such as the William Tell legend, to provide a context for patriot support in the conflict with Britain.

Frederick Muhlenberg (1750–1801), a Lutheran pastor, became a major patriot and politician, rising to be elected as Speaker of the U.S. House of Representatives.

The Pennsylvania Dutch contribution to the war effort was notable:

In the marked influence for right and freedom of these early Hollanders and Palatines, in their brave defense of home, did such valiant service in promoting a love of real freedom to the preserving and hence making of our country.

In the town halls in Dutch cities liberty bells were hung, and from the "Liberty Bell" placed in Philadelphia by Pennsylvania Dutchmen, on July 4th 1776, freedom was proclaimed "throughout all the land and to all the inhabitants thereof." Palatine Dutchmen, especially Nicholas Herkimer, proved some of our bravest men in American Revolutionary War.

Many Hessian prisoners, German mercenaries fighting for the British, were held in camps at the interior city of Lancaster, home to a large German community known as the Pennsylvania Dutch. Hessian prisoners were subsequently treated well, with some volunteering for extra work assignments, helping to replace local men serving in the Continental Army. Due to shared German heritage and abundance of land, many Hessian soldiers stayed and settled in the Pennsylvania Dutch Country after the war's end.

==== Pennsylvania Dutch Provost Corps ====
Pennsylvania Dutch were recruited for the American Provost corps under Captain Bartholomew von Heer, (Note: "It is interesting to note that nearly all men recruited into the Provost Corps were Pennsylvania German." -David L. Valuska) a Prussian who had served in a similar unit in Europe before immigrating to Reading, Pennsylvania, prior to the war.

During the Revolutionary War the Marechaussee Corps were utilized in a variety of ways, including intelligence gathering, route security, enemy prisoner of war operations, and even combat during the Battle of Springfield. The Marechausee also provided security for Washington's headquarters during the Battle of Yorktown, acted as his security detail, and was one of the last units deactivated after the Revolutionary War. The Marechaussee Corps was often not well received by the Continental Army, due in part to their defined duties but also due to the fact that some members of the corps spoke little or no English. Six of the provosts had even been Hessian prisoners of war prior to their recruitment. Because the provost corps completed many of the same functions as the modern U.S. Military Police Corps, it is considered a predecessor of the current United States Military Police Regiment.

=== American Civil War ===
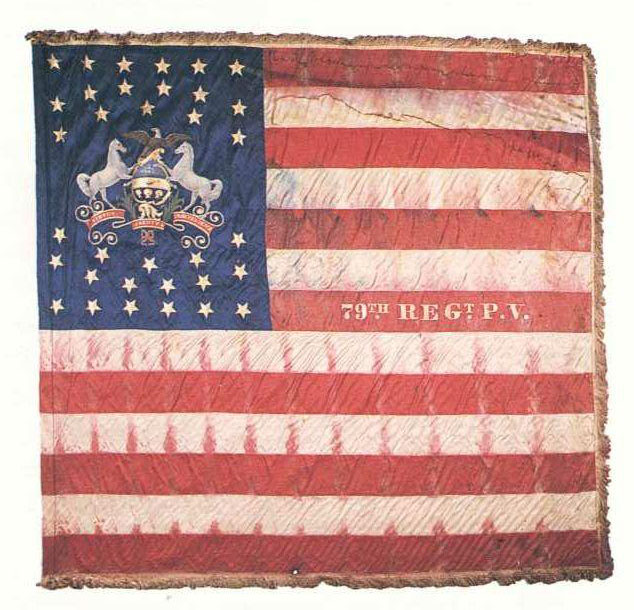
Battle flag of the 79th Pennsylvania Volunteer Infantry Regiment, composed of Pennsylvania Dutch

Nearly all of the regiments from Pennsylvania that fought in the American Civil War had German-speaking or Pennsylvania Dutch-speaking members on their rosters, the majority of whom were Fancy Dutch.

Some regiments like the 153rd Pennsylvania Volunteer Infantry were entirely composed of Pennsylvania Dutch soldiers. The 47th Pennsylvania Infantry Regiment also had a high percentage of German immigrants and Pennsylvania-born men of German heritage on its rosters; the regiment's K Company was formed with the intent of it being an "all-German company."

Pennsylvania Dutch companies sometimes mixed with English-speaking companies. (The Pennsylvania Dutch had the habit of labeling anyone who did not speak Pennsylvania Dutch "English.") Many of the Pennsylvania Dutch soldiers who fought in the Civil War were recruited and trained at Camp Curtin, Pennsylvania.

Pennsylvania Dutch regiments composed a large portion of the Union army, which fought in the Battle of Gettysburg at Gettysburg, Pennsylvania, the bloodiest battle in the Civil War and all of American military history.

== Decline of the Pennsylvania Dutch ==
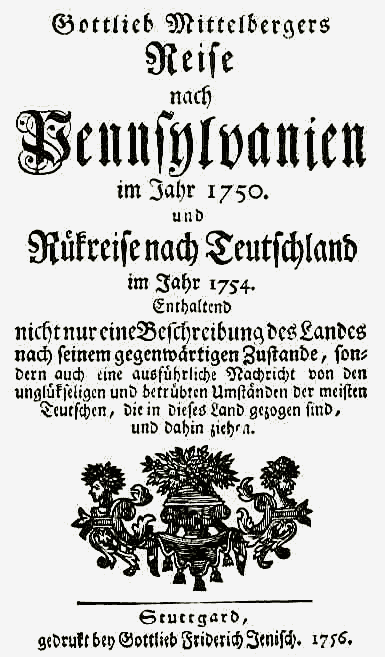
Pennsylvania Dutch have a long literary tradition.

Immediately after the Civil War, the federal government took steps to replace Pennsylvania German schools with English-only schools. The Pennsylvania Dutch fought to retain German as an official language in Pennsylvania to little success.

Literary German disappeared from Pennsylvania Dutch life little by little, starting with schools, and then to churches and newspapers. Pennsylvania Dutch became mainly a spoken language, and as education came to only be provided in English, many Pennsylvania Dutch became bilingual.

=== Anti-German sentiment and Americanization ===
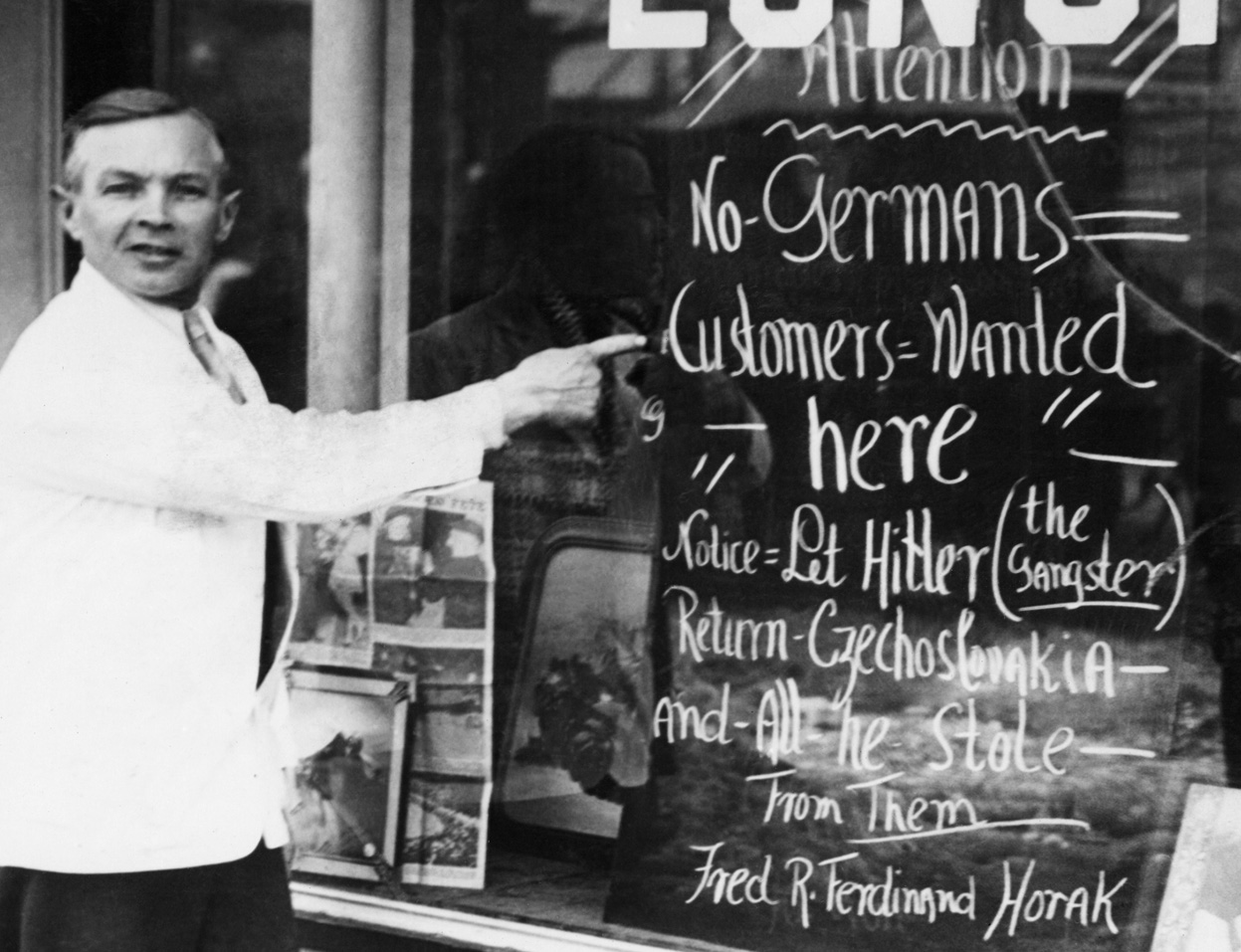
An Anti-German sign reading "No German customers wanted here"

The next blow to Pennsylvania Dutch came during World War I and World War II. Prior to the wars, Pennsylvania Dutch was an urban language spoken openly in the streets of Allentown, Reading, Lancaster, and York; afterwards, it became relegated only to rural areas.

There was rampant social and employment discrimination for anyone suspected of being German. Meritt G. Yorgey, a Pennsylvania Dutch descendant who grew up during the height of anti-German sentiment, remembers the instructions of his father: "Don't ever call yourself "Dutch" or "Pennsylvania German." You're just American."

Many Pennsylvanians of German heritage have chosen to assimilate into Anglo-American culture, except for Amish and Mennonite plain groups who have chosen to remain insular, which has added to the modern misconception that "Pennsylvania Dutch" is synonymous with "Amish."

=== Pennsylvania Dutch during World War I ===
Palatine Dutch of New York in the 27th Infantry Division broke through the Hindenburg Line in 1918.

=== Interwar period ===
Before World War II, the Nazi Party sought to gain the loyalty of the German-American community, and established pro-Nazi German-American Bund, emphasizing German-American immigrant ties to the "Fatherland". The Nazi propaganda effort failed in the Pennsylvania Dutch community, as the Pennsylvania Dutch felt no sense of loyalty to Germany.

=== Pennsylvania Dutch during World War II ===
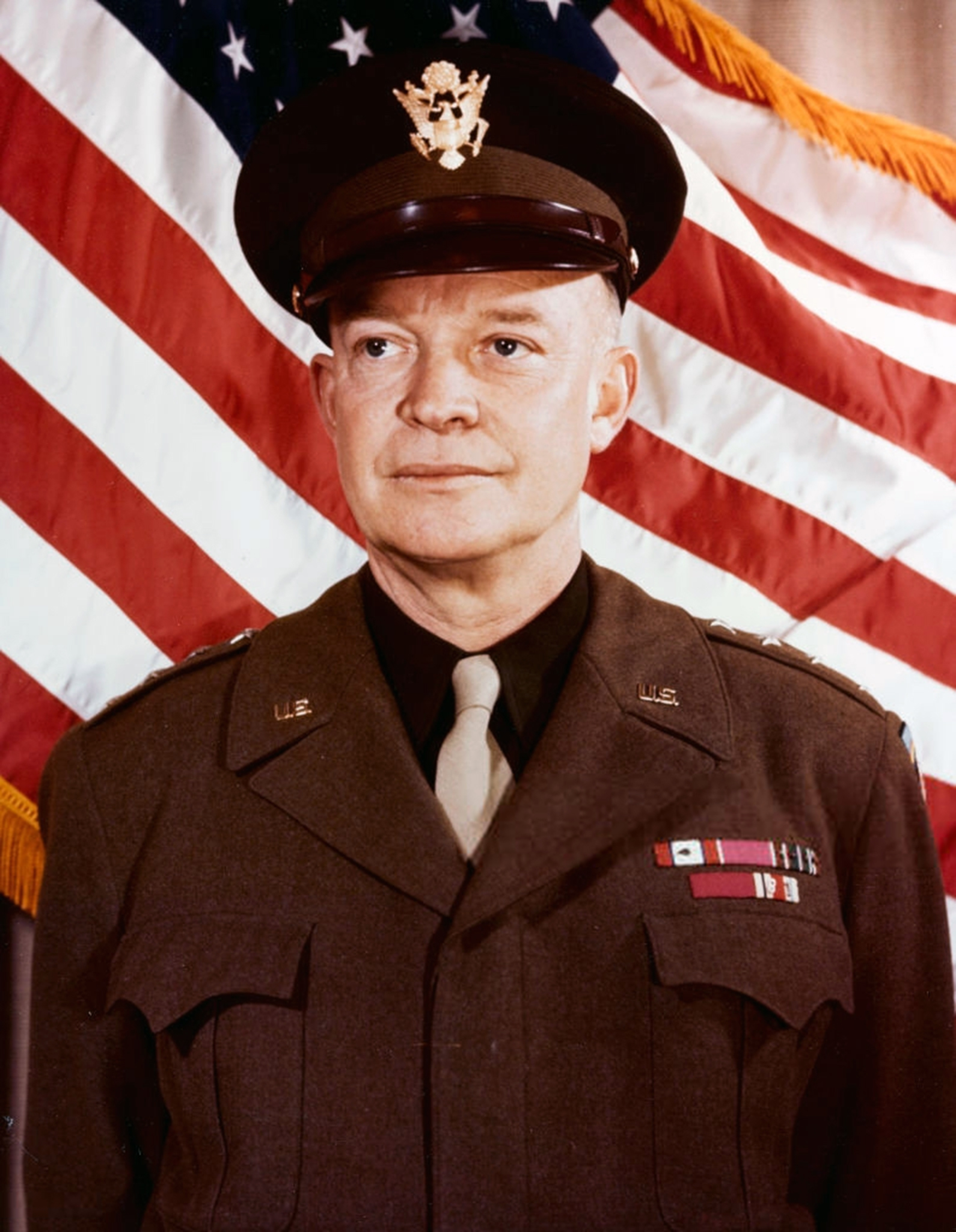
U.S. President Dwight D. Eisenhower was of Pennsylvania Dutch ancestry.

During World War II, a platoon of Pennsylvania Dutch soldiers on patrol in Germany was once spared from being machine-gunned by Nazi soldiers who listened to them approaching. The Germans heard them speaking Pennsylvania Dutch amongst each other and assumed that they were natives of the Palatinate.

== Canadian Pennsylvania Dutch ==
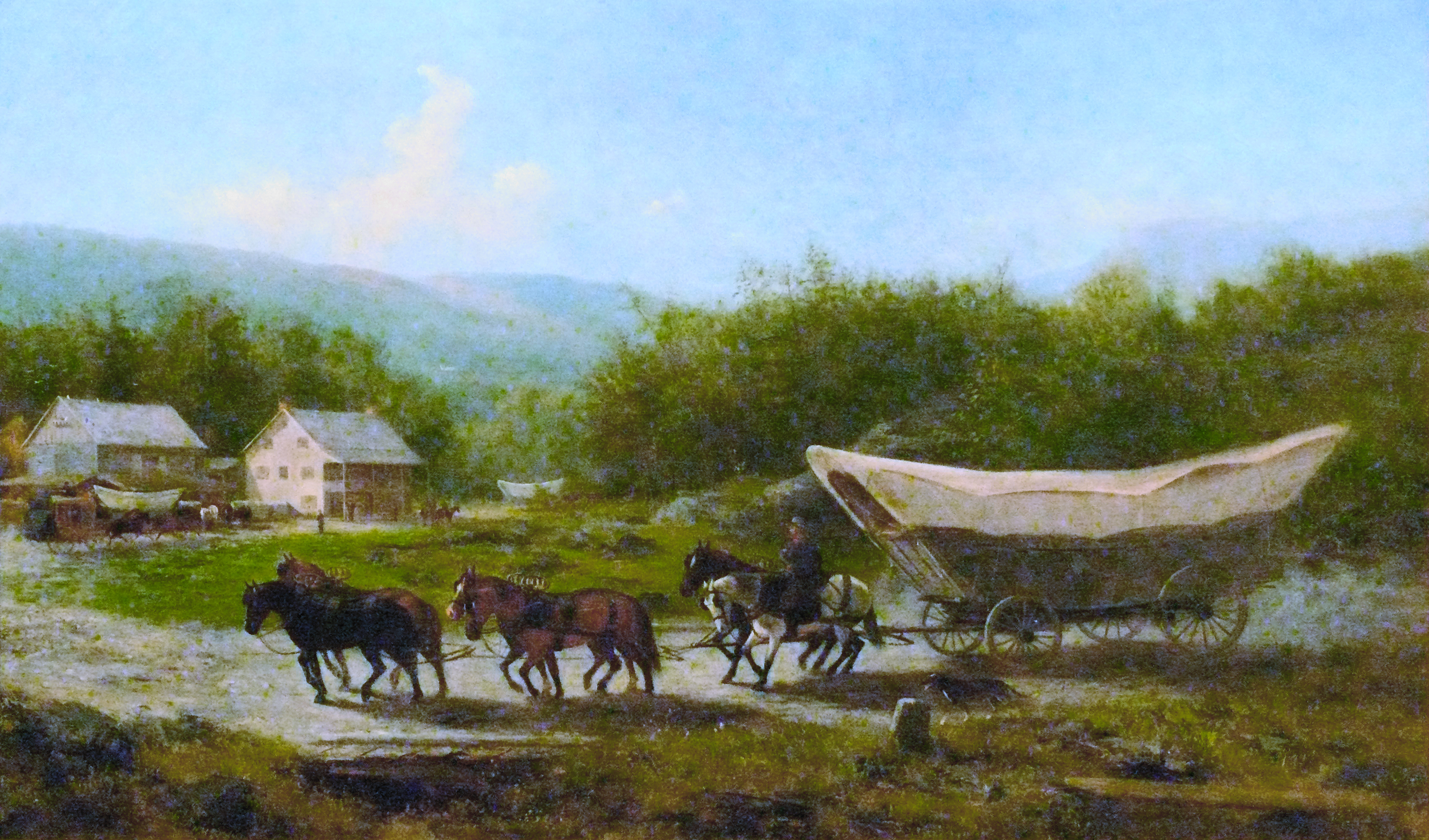
Many Pennsylvania Dutch Mennonites arrived in Waterloo County, Ontario, in Conestoga wagons.

An early group, mainly from the Roxborough-Germantown area of Pennsylvania, emigrated to then colonial Nova Scotia in 1766 and founded the Township of Monckton, site of present-day Moncton, New Brunswick. The extensive Steeves clan descends from this group.

After the American Revolution, John Graves Simcoe, lieutenant governor of Upper Canada, invited Americans, including Mennonites and German Baptist Brethren, to settle in British North American territory and offered tracts of land to immigrant groups. This resulted in communities of Pennsylvania Dutch speakers emigrating to Canada, many to the area called the German Company Tract, a subset of land within the Haldimand Tract, in the Township of Waterloo, which later became Waterloo County, Ontario. Some still live in the area around Markham, Ontario, and particularly in the northern areas of the current Waterloo Region. Some members of the two communities formed the Markham-Waterloo Mennonite Conference. Today, the Pennsylvania Dutch language is mostly spoken by Old Order Mennonites.

From 1800 to the 1830s, some Mennonites in Upstate New York and Pennsylvania moved north to Canada, primarily to the area that would become Cambridge, Kitchener/Waterloo and St. Jacobs/Elmira in Waterloo County, Ontario, plus the Listowel area adjacent to the northwest. Settlement started in 1800 by Joseph Schoerg and Samuel Betzner, Jr. (brothers-in-law), Mennonites, from Franklin County, Pennsylvania. Other settlers followed mostly from Pennsylvania typically by Conestoga wagons. Many of the pioneers arriving from Pennsylvania after November 1803 bought land in a sixty thousand-acre section established by a group of Mennonites from Lancaster County Pennsylvania, called the German Company Lands.

Fewer of the Pennsylvania Dutch settled in what would later become the Greater Toronto Area in areas that would later be the towns of Altona, Ontario, Pickering, Ontario, and especially Markham Village, Ontario, and Stouffville, Ontario. Peter Reesor and brother-in-law Abraham Stouffer were higher profile settlers in Markham and Stouffville.

William Berczy, a German entrepreneur and artist, had settled in upstate New York and in May 1794, he was able to obtain sixty-four acres in Markham Township, near the current city of Toronto. Berczy arrived with approximately one hundred and ninety German families from Pennsylvania and settled here. Others later moved to other locations in the general area, including a hamlet they founded, German Mills, Ontario, named for its grist mill; that community is now called Thornhill, Ontario, in the township that is now part of York Region.

=== Canadian Black Mennonites ===
In Canada, an 1851 census shows many Black people and Mennonites lived near each other in a number of places and exchanged labor; the Dutch would also hire Black laborers. There were also accounts of Black families providing childcare assistance for their Pennsylvania Dutch neighbors. These Pennsylvania Dutch were usually Plain Dutch Mennonites or Fancy Dutch Lutherans. The Black-Mennonite relationship in Canada soon evolved to the level of church membership.

== Society ==
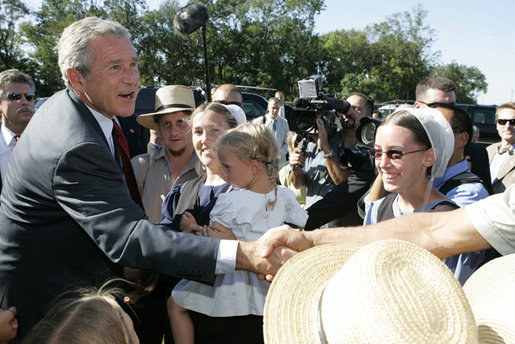
George W. Bush meeting Amish and Mennonites in Lancaster, Pennsylvania in August 2006

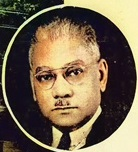
Herbert Millen, Pennsylvania's first Black Judge spoke fluent Pennsylvania Dutch; he was born and raised in Strasburg, Pennsylvania in Pennsylvania Dutch Country.

Pennsylvania Dutch society can be divided into two main groups: the sectarian "Plain Dutch" and the nonsectarian "Church Dutch" also known as "Fancy Dutch". These classifications highlight differences in religious practices, lifestyle, and degrees of assimilation into broader American society.

The Plain Dutch consist of Anabaptist sects, including the Amish, Mennonites, and Brethren. They are known for their conservative, simple lifestyle, characterized by plain dress and limited use of modern technology. These communities typically reside in rural areas, maintaining traditional farming practices and close-knit communal living. Pennsylvania Dutch (a dialect of German) is widely spoken among them, both in daily life and religious settings. The Plain Dutch adhere strictly to their religious and community norms, emphasizing a strong cultural and religious identity with minimal integration into mainstream American culture.

The Church Dutch, in contrast, belong to more mainstream Protestant denominations such as Lutheran, Reformed, United Church of Christ, and some Methodist and Baptist congregations. This group is more integrated into broader American society and is more likely to adopt modern conveniences and technologies. While they may still preserve some Pennsylvania Dutch traditions and language, English is predominantly used in daily life and religious practices. The Church Dutch exhibit a higher degree of assimilation into American culture, while still retaining elements of their Pennsylvania Dutch heritage.

The primary differences between these groups lie in their religious practices, lifestyle, language use, and cultural integration. The Plain Dutch are more conservative and focused on maintaining their distinct cultural identity, whereas the Church Dutch are more assimilated and open to modern influences. In time the Fancy Dutch came to control much of the best agricultural lands, ran many newspapers and maintained their German-inspired architecture when founding new towns in Pennsylvania.

There is little evidence specifically of Black Pennsylvania Dutch speakers during the early 19th century; following the Civil War, some Black Southerners who had moved to Pennsylvania developed close ties with the Pennsylvania Dutch community, adopting the language and assimilating into the culture. An 1892 article in The New York Sun noted a community of "Pennsylvania German Negroes" in Lebanon County for whom German was their first language.

Today Pennsylvania Dutch culture is still prevalent in some parts of Pennsylvania. The Pennsylvania Dutch speak English, with some being bilingual in English and Pennsylvania Dutch. They share cultural similarities with the Mennonites in the same area. Pennsylvania Dutch English retains some German grammar and literally translated vocabulary, some phrases include "outen or out'n the lights" (German: die Lichter ausmachen) meaning "turn off the lights", "it's gonna make wet" (German: es wird nass) meaning "it's going to rain", and "it's all" (German: es ist alle) meaning "it's all gone". They also sometimes leave out the verb in phrases turning "the trash needs to go out" into "the trash needs out" (German: der Abfall muss raus), in alignment with German grammar.

=== Cuisine ===
The Pennsylvania Dutch have some foods that are uncommon outside of places where they live. Some of these include shoo-fly pie, funnel cake, pepper cabbage, filling and jello salads such as strawberry pretzel salad.

=== Furniture ===
Ella Josephine Sterling, Pa., German Love Chest, 1935-1942, Index of American Design, National Gallery of Art (NGA) 15797

Pennsylvania Dutch furniture is often simply designed, with painted decoration. Typical items are hope chests, tables, cupboards and chairs.

=== Religion ===
A young Amish woman from Lancaster

The Pennsylvania Dutch maintain numerous religious affiliations; the greatest number are Lutheran or German Reformed with a lesser number of Anabaptists, including Mennonites, Amish, and Brethren. The Anabaptist groups espoused a simple lifestyle, and their adherents were known as Plain Dutch; this contrasts with the Fancy Dutch, mostly of the Lutheran, or Evangelical and Reformed churches, who tended to assimilate more easily into the American mainstream. By the late 1700s, other denominations were also represented in smaller numbers.

Among immigrants from the 1600s and 1700s, those known as the Pennsylvania Dutch included Mennonites, Swiss Brethren (also called Mennonites by the locals) and Amish but also Anabaptist-Pietists such as German Baptist Brethren and those who belonged to German Lutheran or German Reformed Church congregations. Other settlers of that era were of the Moravian Church (Unitas Fratrum) while a few were Seventh Day Baptists. Calvinist Palatines and several other denominations were also represented to a lesser extent.

Over sixty percent of the immigrants who arrived in Pennsylvania from Germany or Switzerland in the 1700s and 1800s were Lutherans and they maintained good relations with those of the German Reformed Church. The two groups founded Franklin College (now Franklin & Marshall College) in 1787.

According to Elizabeth Pardoe, by 1748, the future of the German culture in Pennsylvania was in doubt, and most of the attention focused on German language schools. Lutheran schools in Germantown and Philadelphia thrived, but most outlying congregations had difficulty recruiting students. Furthermore Lutherans were challenged by Moravians who actively recruited Lutherans to their schools. In the 1750s, Benjamin Franklin led a drive for free charity schools for German students, with the proviso that the schools would minimize Germanness. The leading Lutheran school in Philadelphia school had internal political problems in the 1760s, but Pastor Henry Melchior Muhlenberg resolved them. The arrival of John Christopher Kunze from Germany in 1770 gave impetus to the Halle model in America. Kunze began training clergy and teachers in the Halle system. Reverend Heinrich Christian Helmuth arrived in 1779 and called for preaching only in German, while seeking government subsidies. A major issue was the long-term fate of German culture in Pennsylvania, with most solutions focused on schools. Helmuth saw schools as central to the future of the ethnic community. However most Lutheran clergy believed in assimilation and rejected Helmuth's call to drop English instruction. Kunze's seminary failed, but the first German college in the United States was founded in Lancaster, Pennsylvania, in 1787 as Franklin College; it was later renamed Franklin and Marshall College. The Moravians settled Bethlehem and nearby areas and established schools for Native Americans.

In Pennsylvania, Pennsylvania Dutch Christians and Pennsylvania Dutch Jews have often maintained a special relationship due to their common German language and cultural heritage. Because both Yiddish and the Pennsylvania Dutch language are High German languages, there are strong similarities between the two languages and a limited degree of mutual intelligibility. Historically, Pennsylvania Dutch Christians and Pennsylvania Dutch Jews often had overlapping bonds in German-American business and community life. Due to this historical bond there are several mixed-faith cemeteries in Lehigh County, including Allentown's Fairview Cemetery, where German-Americans of both the Jewish and Protestant faiths are buried.

Urglaawe presents itself as the Pennsylvenia Dutch branch of Heathenry.

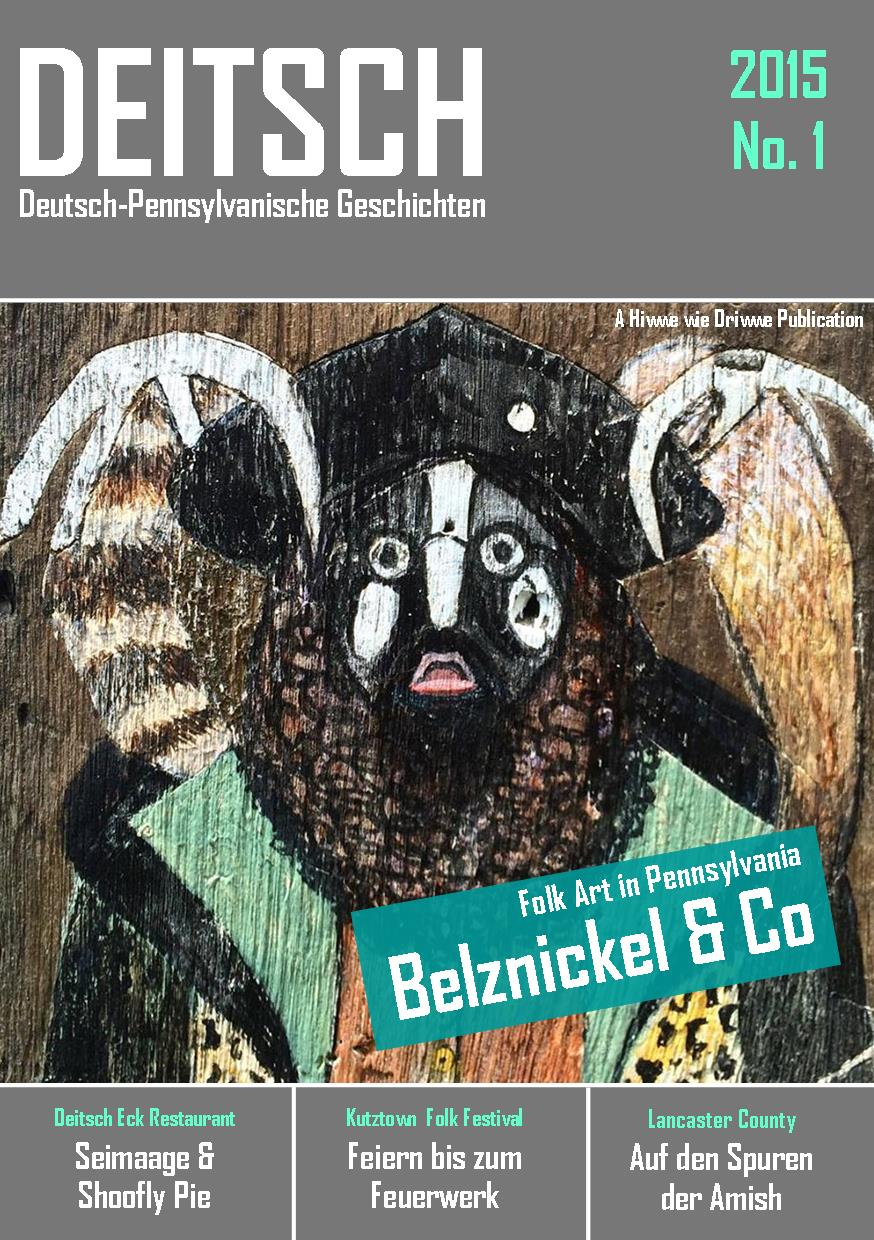
Pennsylvania Dutch arts history in Pennsylvania Dutch language

Although speakers of Pennsylvania Dutch can be found among both sectarians and nonsectarians, most speakers belong to the Old Order Amish and Old Order Mennonites. Nearly all Amish and Mennonites are naturally bilingual, speaking both Pennsylvania Dutch and English natively. The Pennsylvania Dutch language is based on German dialects which have been significantly influenced by English, primarily in terms of vocabulary. Based on dialect features, Pennsylvania Dutch can be classified as a variety of Rhine Franconian, with the Palatine German dialects being most closely related. The language is both commonly referred to as Pennsylvania Dutch and Pennsylvania German, with the latter being more common in scholarly publications.

The primary use of Pennsylvania Dutch, both historically and today, has focussed on spoken communication. Although there is a relatively large collection of written texts in the language dating back to the mid-nineteenth century (such as newspaper columns, short stories, poems, plays, and dialogues) their production and reception have been limited to a minority of speakers. The significance of English among today's sectarians extends far beyond its use for communication with outsiders for business and other purposes as English is the primary language for active literacy. While Amish and Mennonite sectarians can read the Bible, prayer books, and hymnals in German, most other reading materials are in English. Research has show that nonsectarian speakers of Pennsylvania Dutch have a more pronounced Pennsylvania Dutch accent when speaking English compared to sectarian speakers such as the Old Order Amish or Old Order Mennonites.

In the 20th century, the linguists Albert F. Buffington and Preston A. Barba developed a system for writing Pennsylvania Dutch that was largely based on contemporary German orthography, however this is not in common use. No prescribed norms for writing Pennsylvania Dutch exist and in practice most speakers orientate themselves on both German and English spelling systems.

Poem by John Birmelin (1873-1950) on how to spell Pennsylvania German:
Pennsylvania German	Standard German	English
Saagt mer mol, wie soll mer schpelle.	Sag mir mal, wie sollen wir buchstabieren?	So tell me, how should you spell?
Sel macht immer bissel Schtreit;	Das macht immer ein bisschen Streit;	That always makes a bit of an argument.
was ner nau net hawwe welle,	was wir nun nicht haben wollen,	What you don't want to deal with,
schiebt mer graad mol uf die Seit.	schieben wir gerade mal auf die Seite.	you just push off to the side.
Saagt, wie soll mer buchschtawiere,	Sag mir mal, wie sollen wir buchstabieren,	Tell me, how should you orthographize,
in de scheene deitsche Schproch!	in der schönen deutschen Sprache!	in beautiful Pennsylvania Dutch language!
Brauch mer noh ke Zeit verliere,	Brauchen wir nur keine Zeit zu verlieren,	No point in wasting any time,
macht mer's ewwe yuscht so nooch.	machen wir es eben just so nach.	you just follow whatever model you please.

Due to anti-German sentiment between World War I and World War II, the use of the Pennsylvania Dutch language declined, except among the more insular and tradition-bound Plain people, such as the Old Order Amish and Old Order Mennonites. Many German cultural practices continue in Pennsylvania in the present-day, and German remains the largest ancestry claimed by Pennsylvanians, according to the 2008 census.

== Notable people ==
* Jacob Albright (1759–1808), founder, Evangelical Association
- Anne F. Beiler (1949–present), founder, Auntie Anne's pretzels
- John Birmelin (1873–1950), poet and playwright
- Robert Bork (1927–2012), solicitor general of the United States
- Edgar Rice Burroughs (1875–1950), author, creator of Tarzan and John Carter of Mars, Pennsylvania Dutch ancestry on his mother's side
- Walter Chrysler (1875–1940), founder, Chrysler
- Solomon DeLong (1849–1925), writer and journalist
- George Ege (1748–1829), U.S. Representative for Pennsylvania
- Dwight D. Eisenhower (1890–1969), 34th President of the United States
- John Fetterman (1969–present), U.S. Senator for Pennsylvania, 2023–
- H. L. Fischer (1822–1909), writer and translator
- John Fries (1750–1818), auctioneer and organizer of Fries's Rebellion
- Heinrich Funck (1697–1730), miller, author, and Mennonite bishop
- Betty Groff (1935–2015), celebrity chef and cookbook author
- Henry J. Heinz (1844–1919), founder, H. J. Heinz Company
- John Heinz (1938–1991), U.S. Senator for Pennsylvania, 1977–1991
- Nicholas Herkimer (1728–1777), general in the New York Militia during the American Revolution, killed at Battle of Oriskany
- Michael Hillegas (1729–1804), first Treasurer of the United States
- Jimmy Hoffa (1913–unknown), General President of the International Brotherhood of Teamsters, Pennsylvania Dutch ancestry on his father's side
- J. Edgar Hoover (1895–1972), first director of the Federal Bureau of Investigation, Pennsylvania Dutch ancestry on his father's side
- Hedda Hopper (1885–1966), actress and gossip columnist
- Ralph Kiner (1922–2014), Hall of Fame baseball player with Pittsburgh Pirates and New York Mets
- William Kohl (1820–1892), sea captain, shipowner, shipbuilder, and businessman
- James H. Maurer (1864–1944), labor leader, three-term Pennsylvania House of Representatives member, and two-time vice presidential nominee
- Stephen Miller (1816–1881), 4th Governor of Minnesota
- Frederick Muhlenberg (1750–1801), first speaker of the United States House of Representatives
- Peter Muhlenberg (1746–1807), general, commander of the 8th Virginia Regiment during the American Revolution
- Bodo Otto (1711–1787), physician in the Continental Army during the American Revolutionary War
- Harry Hess Reichard (1878–1956), writer and scholar
- Joseph Ritner (1780–1869), 8th Governor of Pennsylvania
- Victor Schertzinger (1888–1941), composer, film director, producer, and screenwriter
- Evelyn Ay Sempier (1933–2008), 1954 Miss America
- Francis R. Shunk (1788–1848), 10th Governor of Pennsylvania
- Simon Snyder (1759–1813), 3rd Governor of Pennsylvania
- Carl Spaatz (1891–1974), Chief of Staff of the United States Air Force
- Wallace Stevens (1879–1955), modernist poet, 1955 Pulitzer Prize for Poetry
- Clement Studebaker (1831–1901), co-founder of Studebaker Corporation
- Clement Studebaker Jr. (1871–1932), businessman and son of Clement Studebaker Sr.
- John Studebaker (1833–1917), co-founder, Studebaker Corporation
- Richard M. Weaver (1910–1963), scholar and English professor
- Conrad Weiser (1696–1760), colonial diplomat between Pennsylvania and Native American nations
- Peter M. Weiser (1781–unknown), member of the Lewis and Clark Expedition and namesake of the Weiser River.
- Dick Winters (1918–2011), U.S. Army Airborne officer featured in Band of Brothers. Winter's father was Anglo-American and his mother came from a Pennsylvania Dutch-speaking Mennonite family.c.

== See also ==
- List of Amish and their descendants
- German American
- Preston Barba, historian and linguist
- Helen Reimensnyder Martin, author
- Anna Balmer Myers, author
- Michael Werner (publisher)
- John Schmid, singer
- Fraktur (Pennsylvania German folk art)
- Hex sign
- Hiwwe wie Driwwe newspaper
- Kurrent handwriting
- Schwenkfeldian (church)
- Old German Baptist Brethren (church)
- Pow-wow
- Weaver family (North Carolina)

== Bibliography ==
- Bronner, Simon J. and Joshua R. Brown, eds. Pennsylvania Germans: An Interpretive Encyclopedia (Johns Hopkins UP, 2017), xviii, 554 pp.
- Donner, William W. " 'Neither Germans nor Englishmen, but Americans': Education, Assimilation, and Ethnicity among Nineteenth Century Pennsylvania Germans," Pennsylvania History 75.2 (2008): 197-226. online
- Eelking, Max von (1893). The German Allied Troops in the North American War of Independence, 1776–1783. Translated from German by J. G. Rosengarten. Joel Munsell's Sons, Albany, NY. LCCN 72081186.
- Grubb, Farley. "German Immigration to Pennsylvania, 1709 to 1820", Journal of Interdisciplinary History Vol. 20, No. 3 (Winter, 1990), pp. 417–436 in JSTOR
- Larkin, Rian. "Plain, Fancy and Fancy-Plain: The Pennsylvania Dutch in the 21st Century." (2018). online
- Louden, Mark L. Pennsylvania Dutch: The Story of an American Language. Baltimore, MD: Johns Hopkins University Press, 2016.
- McMurry, Sally, and Nancy Van Dolsen, eds. Architecture and Landscape of the Pennsylvania Germans, 1720–1920 (University of Pennsylvania Press; 2011) 250 studies their houses, churches, barns, outbuildings, commercial buildings, and landscapes
- Nolt, Steven, Foreigners in Their Own Land: Pennsylvania Germans in the Early American Republic, Penn State U. Press, 2002 ISBN 0-271-02199-3
- Pochmann, Henry A. German Culture in America: Philosophical and Literary Influences 1600–1900 (1957). 890pp; comprehensive review of German influence on Americans esp 19th century. online
- Pochmann, Henry A. and Arthur R. Schult. Bibliography of German Culture in America to 1940 (2nd ed 1982); massive listing, but no annotations.
- Roeber, A. G. Palatines, Liberty, and Property: German Lutherans in Colonial British America (1998)
- Roeber, A. G. "In German Ways? Problems and Potentials of Eighteenth-Century German Social and Emigration History", William & Mary Quarterly, Oct 1987, Vol. 44 Issue 4, pp 750–774 in JSTOR
- Von Feilitzsch, Heinrich Carl Philipp; Bartholomai, Christian Friedrich (1997). Diaries of Two Ansbach Jaegers. Translated by Burgoyne, Bruce E. Bowie, Maryland: Heritage Books. ISBN 0-7884-0655-8.
