= Solomon DeLong =

American journalist

- Born: February 8, 1849; Schnecksville, Pennsylvania, U.S.
- Died: February 2, 1925 (aged 75); Allentown, Pennsylvania, U.S.
- Occupations: Journalist and writer
- Writing career
- Pen name: Obediah Grouthomel
- Notable work: Provided the Pennsylvania German language translation of Clement Clarke Moore's poem A Visit from St. Nicholas (also known as The Night before Christmas)

Solomon DeLong (February 8, 1849 – February 2, 1925) was an American Pennsylvania Dutch language writer and journalist.

== Early life ==
DeLong was born on February 8, 1849, in Schnecksville, Pennsylvania, in the Lehigh Valley region of eastern Pennsylvania.

== Career ==
DeLong was a teacher and businessman. For 12 years, he was the Pennsylvania Dutch language columnist for The Morning Call in Allentown, Pennsylvania, where he wrote under the pen name Obediah Grouthomel.

DeLong made a Pennsylvania Dutch language translation of Clement Clarke Moore's poem, "A Visit from St. Nicholas", also known as "The Night before Christmas". This Pennsylvania Dutch language translation of the poem was first printed in The Morning Call on December 24, 1920.

== Death ==
DeLong died on February 25, 1925, in Allentown, Pennsylvania, at age 75.
