= H. L. Fischer =

American journalist

- Born: 1822; Franklin County, Pennsylvania
- Died: 1909 (aged 86–87)
- Writing career
- Genres: Pennsylvania German language writer and translator
- Notable work: Translation of Edgar Allan Poe's "The Raven"

H. L. Fischer (1822 – November 5, 1909) (Henry Lee Fischer) was a Pennsylvania German language writer and translator. He was born in what was called the Dutch Settlement in Franklin County, Pennsylvania, United States in 1822, and died in 1909. He worked as a teacher and lawyer, and in later years during a siege of illness, wrote a lot of Pennsylvania German language poetry, including the translation of Edgar Allan Poe's "The Raven", which was published in pamphlet form at his Mapleshade home at York, 1891-07-07.

A few lines from "Der Krab", his translation of "The Raven":

Es war mitternacht un' schaurig,
Ich war schlaf'rig, mud, un traurig
Uewer fiel so alte Bucher
Foll so ganz fergess'ne ne Lehr;
Un' ich hab so halwer g'schlummert -
Hot 's uf e'mol so gebummert -
So wie 's macht wan 's bissel dunnert
- Das es rappelt an der Dheer;
" 'S isch en B'sucher," sag ich zu mer
Selwert, - "Klopt an meiner Dheer -
Des, allee, isch 's was ich hor."
