= Earl C. Haag =

American scholar and author (1929–2025)

- Born: June 24, 1929; New Haven, Connecticut, U.S.
- Died: October 11, 2025 (aged 96); Pottsville, Pennsylvania, U.S.
- Occupations: Scholar, author

Earl Carl Haag (June 24, 1929 – October 11, 2025) was an American scholar and author in the Pennsylvania German language. His dialect pseudonym was Der Alt Professor. In 2010, his contributions to the field of German-American studies were recognized by The Society for German-American Studies with the publication of "The Language and Culture of the Pennsylvania Germans: A Festschrift for Earl C. Haag," in a supplemental issue of the Yearbook of German-American Studies.

== Early life and education ==
Born in New Haven, Connecticut, on June 24, 1929, Haag graduated from the University of Connecticut with a Bachelor of Arts degree in German in 1952, earned his Master of Arts from Pennsylvania State University, and subsequently advanced to doctoral studies with Pennsylvania German expert Albert Buffington. He then also pursued additional training in 1953 and 1954 at the University of Heidelberg, in Heidelberg, Germany, where he focused his studies on Palatinate dialects.

== Academic career ==
Haag began his long tenure with Pennsylvania State University in 1958. Initially employed by the university's Pottsville Penn State Center in Pottsville, Schuylkill County from 1958 through the early part of 1962, he transferred to the university's new Schuylkill campus when it opened later that year.

An assistant professor through the 1970s, Haag was promoted to associate professor of German and English Composition at Penn States's Schuylkill campus in May 1986. Since April 5, 1984, he has researched, written and published the weekly column, Es Neinuhr Schtick, which has been syndicated in multiple newspaper columns across Pennsylvania.

== Public service ==
From 1961 to 1987, Haag served as a judge for the Schuylkill County spelling bee for students in the county's K-12 schools. He was honored by the Pottsville Republican (now the Republican Herald) in 1987 for his longtime service to the community.

== Death ==
Haag died in Pottsville on October 11, 2025, at the age of 96.

== Publications ==
Haag wrote and edited numerous books and other publications throughout his career, including:

- A Pennsylvania German Anthology (1988) ISBN 9780941664295
- A Pennsylvania German Reader and Grammar (1982, 1985, 1997) ISBN 9780271003146
- En Pennsylvaanisch Deitsch Yaahr: A Pennsylvania Dutch Year (1990)
- The First One Hundred Years: An Index of Publications of the Pennsylvania German Society (1891-1990) Including the Yearbooks of the Pennsylvania German Folklore Society (1936-1966) (1998) ISBN 9780911122626
- Die Pennsylvaanisch Deitsche: The Pennsylvania Germans
  - volume one (2010) ISBN 9780911122114
  - volume two (2017) ISBN 9780911122220
- Der Schtruwwelpitter gschpassiche Gschichde un lecherliche Pickders (Tintenfaß, 2010) ISBN 9783937467894
- William Keel and C. Richard Beam, editors, The Language and Culture of the Pennsylvania Germans: a Festschrift for Earl C. Haag (2010)
- Pennsylvaanisch Deitsch Schtoris: Pennsylvania Dutch Stories (2016)
