= Ezra (name) =

- Pronunciation: /ˈɛzrə/
- Gender: Male
- Language: Hebrew
- Name day: July 13

Origin
- Origin: Ancient Hebrew priest Ezra
- Meaning: Help, helpful and helper

Other names
- See also: Ezra, Esdras (Greek-Latin variant)
- Popularity: see popular names

Ezra (Hebrew: עֶזְרָא) is a masculine given name of Hebrew origin, derived from the root ע־ז־ר meaning 'help'.

The name originated from the Biblical figure Ezra the Scribe, who is traditionally credited as the author of Ezra–Nehemiah and the Books of Chronicles of the Hebrew Bible. The name is a probable abbreviation of the name Azaryahu (עזריהו) which means "Yahweh helps". The name alternatively has the Greek-Latin form Esdras which was used for Ezra the Scribe which comes from the Greek word (Ἔσδρας). The name grew in popularity in the United States between 2000 and 2018, its ranking climbing from 431st to 59th.

== Given name ==
=== Male ===
- Ezra A. Bowen, American politician
- Ezra A. Burrell (1867–1930), American politician
- Ezra A. Carman (1834–1909), American Union Army officer during the American Civil War
- Ezra Abbot (1819–1884), American biblical scholar
- Ezra Ames (1768–1836), American portrait painter
- Ezra Armstrong (born 1998), American USLC player
- Ezra Attiya (1885–1970), Syrian-born Israeli rabbi
- Ezra B. French (1810–1880), American politician
- Ezra B. W. Zubrow (born 1945), American anthropologist
- Ezra Baker (c. 1765–?), American politician and physician
- Ezra Bartlett (1861–1942), English cricketer
- Ezra Baya Lawiri (c. 1917–1991), Sudanese teacher, Episcopalian priest, and scholar
- Ezra ben Abraham, 12th-century Syrian Jewish rabbi
- Ezra ben Isaac Fano, 16th- and 17th-century Italian rabbi
- Ezra Bick (born 1970), American-Israeli Modern Orthodox rabbi, author, editor, and lecturer
- Ezra Booth (1792–1873), American farmer and Mormon leader
- Ezra Brainerd (1844–1924), American academic administrator
- Ezra Brown (born 1944), American mathematician
- Ezra Brudno (1877–1954), Jewish American novelist and author of history
- Ezra Burnham (1947–1973), Barbadian Olympic sprinter
- Ezra Butler (1763–1838), American clergyman, politician, lawyer, and judge
- Ezra Butler (American football) (born 1984), South African-born American former football player
- Ezra Butler Eddy (1827–1906), Canadian businessman and political figure
- Ezra Buzzington, American television- and film character actor
- Ezra C. Carleton (1838–1911), American politician
- Ezra C. Dalby (1869–1934), American academic administrator
- Ezra C. Gross (1787–1829), American lawyer and politician
- Ezra Carlson (born 1994), American rower
- Ezra Carter (1898–1975), American folk music group manager
- Ezra Chadza (1923–1985), Malawian teacher, author, and poet
- Ezra Chadzamira (born 1965), Zimbabwean politician
- Ezra Charles (born 1944), American singer, pianist, songwriter, bandleader, and founder of company Helpinstill
- Ezra Chiloba (born 1979), Kenyan executive
- Ezra Chitando, Zimbabwean religious studies academic and professor
- Ezra Churchill (1804–1874), Canadian industrialist
- Ezra Churchill Henniger (1873–1959), Canadian politician
- Ezra Clark Stillman (1907–1995), American linguist
- Ezra Clark Jr. (1813–1896), American politician
- Ezra Cleveland (born 1998), American NFL player
- Ezra Cline (1907–1984), American member of bluegrass band Lonesome Pine Fiddlers
- Ezra Cohen, American intelligence official
- Ezra Cohen (ambassador), Panamanian businessman and ambassador
- Ezra Convis (?–1837), American politician
- Ezra Cornell (1807–1874), American businessman, politician, academic, and philanthropist
- Ezra Dagan (born 1947), Israeli actor
- Ezra Dangoor (1848–1930), Iraqi rabbi
- Ezra Danin (1903–1984), Israeli Jewish spy
- Ezra Danolds Cole (1902–1992), American philatelist
- Ezra Darby (1768–1808), American politician
- Ezra Davids (born 1964), South African lawyer
- Ezra Dean (1795–1872), American politician, lawyer, and judge
- Ezra Dotan (1937–1981), Israeli Air Force officer and fighter ace
- Ezra Drown (?–1863), American district attorney
- Ezra Dumart (1882–1954), Canadian OPHL- and NHA player
- Ezra Durgin (1796–1863), American politician
- Ezra Dwight Sanderson (1878–1944), American entomologist, sociologist, and professor
- Ezra E. H. Griffith (born 1942), American psychiatrist and professor emeritus
- Ezra Edelman (born 1974), American documentary producer and director
- Ezra F. Kysor (1835–1907), American architect
- Ezra F. Vogel (1930–2020), American scholar, sociologist, and professor
- Ezra Finzi, German actor
- Ezra Fisher (1800–1874), American Baptist missionary and pioneer
- Ezra Fitch (1865–1930), American real estate developer, hobbyist outdoorsman, and lawyer; co-founder of Abercrombie & Fitch
- Ezra Fleischer (1928–2006), Romanian-Israeli Hebrew-language poet and philologist
- Ezra Foot (1809–1885), American politician
- Ezra Frank Sperry (1843–1916), American politician
- Ezra Frech (born 2005), American Paralympic high jumper, long jumper, and sprinter
- Ezra G. Levin (1934–2022), American lawyer and academic
- Ezra Getzler (born 1962), Australian mathematician and mathematical physicist
- Ezra Gilliland (1845–1903), American inventor
- Ezra Glantz (born 1945), American Olympic handball player
- Ezra Godden, Spanish actor
- Ezra Graves (1803–1883), American lawyer and politician
- Ezra Greenleaf Weld (1801–1874), American photographer and abolitionist
- Ezra H. Ripple (1842–1909), American businessman, politician, and Union Army soldier during the American Civil War
- Ezra Hall Gillett (1823–1875), American clergyman and author
- Ezra Hamilton (1833–1914), American prospector, developer, and inventor
- Ezra Hanson-White, American video game developer
- Ezra Hendrickson (born 1972), Vincentian MLS coach and former player
- Ezra Henniger (1927–1990), Canadian Olympic middle-distance runner
- Ezra Heymann (1928–2014), Venezuelan philosopher and university professor
- Ezra Heywood (1829–1893), American individualist anarchist, slavery abolitionist, and advocate of women's rights
- Ezra Holmes (1885–1921), English professional footballer
- Ezra Horton (1861–1939), English footballer
- Ezra Ichilov (1907–1961), Israeli politician
- Ezra Idlet, American member of musical duo Trout Fishing in America (duo)
- Ezra J. McCandless (born 1997), American convicted murderer
- Ezra J. William (born 1989), Indonesian-born American socialite, fashion blogger, and restaurateur
- Ezra Jack Keats (1916–1983), American writer and illustrator of children's books
- Ezra Jacob Kraus (1885–1960), American botanist and horticulturist
- Ezra Jenkinson (1872–1947), English composer and violinist
- Ezra Johnson (born 1955), American former NFL player
- Ezra Kanoho (1927–2022), American politician
- Ezra Kendall (1861–1910), American actor-comedian, humorist, playwright, and author
- Ezra Kire (born 1975), American musician
- Ezra Klein (born 1984), American political commentator, blogger, podcast host, and journalist
- Ezra Koenig (born 1984), American musician, television- and record producer, screenwriter, and radio personality
- Ezra Labaton (1950–2013), American Modern Orthodox rabbi and Jewish philosopher
- Ezra Laderman (1924–2015), American composer of classical music
- Ezra Lee (1749–1821), American colonial soldier
- Ezra Lee (musician) (born 1986), Australian singer-songwriter and pianist
- Ezra Letsoalo, South African politician
- Ezra Levant (born 1972), Canadian media personality, political activist, writer, broadcaster, and former lawyer
- Ezra Levin (born 1986), American political activist
- Ezra Light Grumbine (1845–1923), American medical doctor, local historian, columnist, and poet
- Ezra Lincoln (1868–1951), American MLB pitcher
- Ezra Malki, 17th-century Greek Orthodox Jewish rabbi
- Ezra Mam (born 2003), Australian professional rugby league footballer
- Ezra Martinson (1885–1968), Ghanaian Anglican bishop
- Ezra Mayers (born 2007), English professional footballer
- Ezra McGlothin, real name of Pat McGlothin (1920–2014), American MLB pitcher
- Ezra Meech (1773–1856), American fur trader and politician
- Ezra Meeker (1830–1928), American pioneer
- Ezra Michel, American singer-songwriter, musician, actor, and social media influencer
- Ezra Michener (1794–1887), American botanist and medical doctor
- Ezra Midkiff (1882–1957), American MLB player
- Ezra Millard (1833–1886), American politician and businessman
- Ezra Miller (born 1992), American actor
- Ezra Miller (politician) (1812–1885), American inventor and politician
- Ezra Mir (1903–1993), Indian filmmaker
- Ezra Morse (1643–1697), American mill owner
- Ezra Moseley (1958–2021), Barbadian cricketer
- Ezra Nahmad (1945–2023), Monegasque billionaire art dealer and collector
- Ezra Nawi (1951–2021), Israeli peace activist and plumber
- Ezra Norton (1897–1967), Australian newspaper baron and businessman
- Ezra Nutter, English cricketer
- Ezra Olubi (born 1986), Nigerian entrepreneur, software developer, and LGBTQ rights advocate
- Ezra Orion (1934–2015), Israeli sculptor
- Ezra Otis Kendall (1818–1899), American professor, astronomer, and mathematician
- Ezra P. Ewers, American Union Army soldier during the American Civil War
- Ezra P. Prentice (1877–1966), American lawyer and politician
- Ezra P. Savage (1842–1920), American politician
- Ezra Palmer Gould (1841–1900), American Baptist- and Episcopal minister, and soldier in the American Civil War
- Ezra Parmenter (1823–1883), American politician
- Ezra Potash (born 1993), American musician and television personality
- Ezra Pound (1885–1972), American poet and critic
- Ezra Poyas (born 1981), Australian AFL- and former VFL player
- Ezra Rachlin (1915–1995), American conductor and pianist
- Ezra Riley (1866–1937), Canadian politician and rancher
- Ezra Ripley (1751–1841), American minister
- Ezra Ripley Thayer (1866–1915), American attorney, professor of law, and university dean
- Ezra Royals (1882–1939), English footballer
- Ezra S. Carr (1819–1894), American professor of natural sciences and agriculture
- Ezra Sambu (born 1978), Kenyan Olympic sprinter
- Ezra Schabas (1924–2020), Canadian musician, educator, and author
- Ezra Schochet, American Orthodox Jewish rabbi
- Ezra Schwartz, American Orthodox Jewish rabbi and university administrator
- Ezra Schwartz, American murder victim
- Ezra Scollay Stearns (1838–1915), American historian, genealogist, and politician
- Ezra Seaman (1805–1880), American lawyer and political theorist
- Ezra Sellers (1968–2013), American professional boxer
- Ezra Seymour Gosney (1855–1942), American businessman and philanthropist
- Ezra Sidwell (1885–1949), English professional rugby league footballer
- Ezra Sigwela (born 1940), South African retired politician and former anti-apartheid activist
- Ezra Sims (1928–2015), American classical composer
- Ezra Solomon (1920–2002), American professor of economics
- Ezra Sosa (born 2000), American professional Latin- and ballroom dancer
- Ezra Sperling, birth name of Edward Sperling (1889–1946), Belarusian-born American writer, humourist, and Zionist
- Ezra Spicehandler (1921–2014), American rabbi, writer, editor, and educator
- Ezra Squier Tipple (1861–1936), American university president
- Ezra Stiles (disambiguation), several people
- Ezra Stoller (1915–2004), American architectural photographer
- Ezra Stone (1917–1994), American actor and director
- Ezra Sued (1923–2011), Argentine international footballer
- Ezra Suruma (born 1945), Ugandan economist, banker, and academic
- Ezra Sutton (1849–1907), American MLB player
- Ezra Swerdlow (1953–2018), American film producer and production manager
- Ezra T. Benson (1811–1869), American Mormon leader
- Ezra T. Champlin (1839–1928), American politician
- Ezra T. Newman (1929–2021), American physicist
- Ezra T. Sprague (1833–1888), American lawyer, judge, and politician
- Ezra Taft Benson (1899–1994), American farmer, federal government official, and Mormon leader
- Ezra Tawil (1967–2024), American scholar of literature, literary critic, and professor of English
- Ezra Taylor, several people
- Ezra Thayre (1791–1862), American Mormon leader
- Ezra Thompson (1850–1923), American businessman, mayor, and Mormon leader
- Ezra Townsend Cresson (1838–1926), American entomologist
- Ezra Uzi Yemin (born 1968), Israeli-American entrepreneur, industrialist, and philanthropist
- Ezra W. Mudge (1811–1878), American politician
- Ezra W. Taft (1800–1885), American politician and businessman
- Ezra W. Wilkinson (1801–1882), American politician and jurist
- Ezra Walian (born 1997), Dutch-born Indonesian professional footballer
- Ezra Warner, several people
- Ezra Weeks, American builder
- Ezra Weisz (born 1971), American voice actor and director
- Ezra Wescott (1818–1865), American magistrate and educator
- Ezra Weston II (1772–1842), American shipbuilder and merchant
- Ezra Wheeler (1820–1871), American politician, lawyer, and judge
- Ezra Williams (born 1980), American basketball player
- Ezra Williams (singer), Irish singer
- Ezra Winter (1886–1949), American muralist
- Ezra Wyeth (1910–1992), Australian cricketer
- Ezra Zilkha (1925–2019), American financier and philanthropist
- Ezra Zion Melamed (1903–1994), Israeli rabbi, scholar, and lexicographer

=== Female ===
- Ezra Franky, Canadian actress and singer
- Ezra Furman (born 1986), American musician and songwriter

== Middle name ==
- Charles Ezra, several people
- J. Ezra Merkin (born 1953), American investor, hedge fund manager, and philanthropist

== Surname ==
- Adam Ben Ezra (born 1982), Israeli multi-instrumentalist, composer, and educator
- Alfred Ezra (1872–1955), British Jewish breeder and keeper of birds
- David Alan Ezra (born 1947), American district judge
- Daniel Ezra (born 1991), English actor
- Edward Isaac Ezra (1883–1921), Chinese Jewish businessman, philanthropist, and hotelier
- Elias David Ezra (1830–1886), Indian property owner
- Gabriella Ezra (1928–2019), Italian language coach
- George Ezra (born 1993), English musician, singer-songwriter, and podcaster
- Gideon Ezra (1937–2012), Israeli politician
- Hen Ezra (born 1989), Israeli footballer
- Isaac ben Ezra, 10th-century Spanish rabbi
- Mark Ezra, British film writer, producer, director, actor, and published children's author
- Michael Ezra (born 1973), Ugandan businessman and philanthropist
- N.E.B. Ezra (1883–1936), Baghdadi Jewish publisher and Zionist
- Red Ezra, American director, producer, editor, writer, and photographer
- Roni Ezra (born 1973), Danish film director and screenwriter
- Members of the ibn Ezra, Spanish Jewish family

== Fictional characters ==
- Ezra Bridger, in the US media franchise Star Wars, voiced by Taylor Gray
- Ezra Buckley, in the 20th-century Argentine short story Tlön, Uqbar, Orbis Tertius
- Ezra Dingle, in the UK TV soap opera Emmerdale, played by John Henshaw
- Ezra Fitz, in the US teen drama mystery TV series Pretty Little Liars, played by Ian Harding
- Ezra Hanley, in the Australian TV soap opera Neighbours, played by Steve Nation
- Ezra Jennings, in the 1868 UK novel The Moonstone
- Ezra Mannon, in the 1931 US play cycle Mourning Becomes Electra, played by Lee Baker
- Ezra Powell, in the US medical drama TV series House, played by Joel Grey
- Ezra Rumstick, in the US novel series Revolution at Sea saga
- Ezra Whakapono, in the New Zealand prime-time soap opera Shortland Street, played by Dylan Poihipi
