= Deaths in November 1996 =

The following is a list of notable deaths in November 1996.

Entries for each day are listed alphabetically by surname. A typical entry lists information in the following sequence:

- Name, age, country of citizenship at birth, subsequent country of citizenship (if applicable), reason for notability, cause of death (if known), and reference.

== November 1996 ==
=== 1 ===
- Maati Bouabid, 68, Prime Minister of Morocco.
- Sid Cann, 85, English football player and manager.
- Lycette Darsonval, 84, French dancer.
- Edgardo Enríquez, 84, Chilean physician, academic and politician.
- Gerhard Hilbrecht, 81, German Olympic discus thrower (1936).
- J. R. Jayewardene, 90, President of Sri Lanka, colon cancer.
- William Johnstone, 88, American actor.
- Clyde Lynn, 60, American racing driver.
- Eric Reissner, 83, German-American civil engineer and mathematician.

=== 2 ===
- Roger Carré, 75, French footballer.
- Eva Cassidy, 33, American singer and guitarist, melanoma.
- John G. Crommelin, 94, American naval officer and white supremacist politician.
- Joseph Lambert Eustace, 88, Governor-General of Saint Vincent and the Grenadines.
- Don Gent, 63, Australian rules footballer.
- Pierre Grimal, 83, French classical philologist.
- Kang Hyo-shil, 64, South Korean actress.
- Yan Jici, 95, Chinese physicist and politician.
- Shanti Swaroop Rana, 47, Indian military officer, killed in action.
- Laurence L. Sloss, 83, American geologist.
- Arnie Tuadles, 40, Filipino basketball player, shot.
- Peter White, 26, Australian rules footballer.

=== 3 ===
- Jean-Bedel Bokassa, 75, 2nd President of the Central African Republic and Emperor of Central Africa, heart attack.
- William Clarke, 45, American blues harmonica player and singer.
- Ray Mansfield, 55, American gridiron football player (Philadelphia Eagles, Pittsburgh Steelers), heart attack.
- Marian Plezia, 79, Polish historian.
- Barry Porter, 57, British politician, cancer.
- Yevhen Shcherban, 50, Ukrainian businessman and politician, shot.
- Paul Tatum, 41, American businessman, shot.
- Isaac M. Taylor, 75, American medical academic, pneumonia.
- Abdullah Çatlı, 40, Turkish nationalist and leader of the Grey Wolves, traffic accident.

=== 4 ===
- T. Vincent Learson, 84, American chairman and chief executive officer of IBM.
- Ray Linn, 76, American jazz trumpeter.
- Konstantin Loktev, 63, Russian ice hockey player and Olympian (1960, 1964), liver cirrhosis.
- Kjetil Mårdalen, 71, Norwegian skier and Olympian (1956).
- Gottlieb Weber, 86, Swiss Olympic cyclist (1936).

=== 5 ===
- Bunny Breckinridge, 93, American actor and drag queen.
- Allen Broussard, 67, American judge.
- Eddie Harris, 62, American jazz musician, congestive heart failure.
- Joaquín Monserrat, 75, Spanish comedian and host of children programs.
- Wilhelm Sturm, 56, German football player.
- John Dragon Young, 47, Hong Kong-American historian and politician.

=== 6 ===
- Harry Brophy, 80, English football player.
- Vadim Ivanov, 53, Russian football player and manager.
- Houn Jiyu-Kennett, 72, British Rōshi.
- Dragan Kresoja, 50, Serbian film director.
- Tommy Lawton, 77, English football player and manager, pneumonia.
- Richard Nelson, 57, American theatrical lighting designer.
- Mario Savio, 53, American activist and Berkeley Free Speech Movement member, heart problems.

=== 7 ===
- Claude Ake, 57, Nigerian political scientist, plane crash.
- Beauford T. Anderson, 74, United States Army soldier and recipient of the Medal of Honor.
- Feliciano Centurión, 34, Paraguayan visual artist, AIDS-related complications.
- Bill Chisholm, 87, American Olympic racewalker (1932).
- Reg Goodes, 68, Australian rules footballer.
- Carmell Jones, 60, American jazz trumpet player, heart failure.
- Hans Klodt, 82, German football player.
- Sverre Kolterud, 88, Norwegian Nordic combined skier and Olympian (1932).
- Salvatore Lauricella, 74, Italian politician and mayor.
- Eddie Lukon, 76, American baseball player (Cincinnati Reds).
- Bosh Pritchard, 77, American National Football League football player (Cleveland Rams, Philadelphia Eagles, New York Giants).
- Jaja Wachuku, 78, Nigerian prince, politician, diplomat and Pan-Africanist.

=== 8 ===
- Andrés Rivero Agüero, 91, Cuban politician.
- Laurence Baxter, 42, English statistician.
- Peter Fowler, 73, British physicist.
- Johannes Frömming, 86, German harness racing driver and trainer.
- Franklin Gritts, 81, Native American painter and commercial artist.
- Mathews I, 89, Indian Supreme Primate of the Malankara Orthodox Syrian Church.
- Tan Onuma, 78, Japanese writer.
- Sydney Selwyn, 62, British physician and medical scientist, multiple system atrophy.

=== 9 ===
- Gudmundur Arnlaugsson, 83, Icelandic chess player.
- Joe Ghiz, 51, Canadian lawyer and politician, cancer.
- Michel Mitrani, 66, French film director and screenwriter.
- Roger Makins, 1st Baron Sherfield, 92, British diplomat.
- Alvin Straight, 76, American lawn mower traveler.
- Yoshimi Ueda, 90, Japanese basketball player and administrator.

=== 10 ===
- Imam Alimsultanov, 39, Popular Chechen bard and folk singer, homicide.
- Jack Evans, 68, Canadian ice hockey player and coach, prostate cancer.
- Yaki Kadafi, 19, American rapper (Outlawz, Dramacydal), shot.
- Richard Mayo, 94, American Army general and Olympic athlete (1928, 1932).
- Marjorie Proops, 85, British journalist.
- Manik Varma, 70, Indian classical singer.
- Gucheng Zhou, 98, Chinese politician.

=== 11 ===
- Janice Adair, 91, British film actress.
- Jo Baker, 48, American singer and songwriter, liver disease.
- Eugene Davy, 92, Irish rugby union football player and coach.
- Curt Göransson, 87, Swedish general and commander of the Army.
- Lum Harris, 81, American baseball player (Philadelphia Athletics, Washington Senators), coach, manager, and scout, complications of diabetes.
- Paul J. F. Lusaka, 61, Zambian politician and diplomat.
- Gober Sosebee, 81, American racecar driver, agriculture accident.

=== 12 ===
- Thomas Miller Bell, 73, Canadian politician, lawyer and barrister.
- Don Kenyon, 72, English cricket player.
- Le Nguyen Khang, 65, South Vietnamese commander.
- Peter Leeds, 79, American actor, cancer.
- Robert Mitchell, 82, British Olympic water polo player (1936, 1948).
- Cordell Reagon, 53, American singer and activist, homicide.
- Tom Reid, 70, Irish rugby player.
- Vytautas Žalakevičius, 66, Lithuanian film director and writer.

=== 13 ===
- Chester Blanchard, 93, American baseball player.
- Bill Doggett, 80, American jazz and R&B pianist and organist, heart attack.
- June Gale, 85, American actress, pneumonia.
- James Galloway, 68, American film editor.
- Alfred Guth, 88, Austrian athlete and Olympian (1936).
- Leo Helgas, 94, Finnish Olympic middle-distance runner (1928).
- Alma Kitchell, 103, American concert singer.
- Jim Ladd, 64, American football player (Chicago Cardinals).
- Roger McCardell, 64, American baseball player (San Francisco Giants).
- Katja Medbøe, 50, Norwegian actress, suicide.
- Swami Rama, 70-71, Indian yoga guru.
- Dick Richards, 88, American football player (Brooklyn Dodgers).
- Bobbie Vaile, 37, Australian astronomer, brain cancer.

=== 14 ===
- Jim Baxes, 68, American Major League Baseball player (Los Angeles Dodgers, Cleveland Indians).
- Jacomina van den Berg, 86, Dutch Olympic gymnast (1928).
- Joseph Bernardin, 68, American Cardinal of the Catholic Church, pancreatic cancer.
- Nell Blaine, 74, American landscape painter and watercolorist.
- Virginia Cherrill, 88, American actress, stroke.
- Giuliano Giuliani, 38, Italian football player and Olympian (1988), complications of AIDS.
- Nodar Gvakhariya, 64, Soviet Georgian Olympic water polo player (1956).
- Meridel Le Sueur, 96, American writer.
- Derek Marlowe, 58, English playwright, novelist, and painter.
- Elman Service, 81, American anthropologist.
- Jacomina van den Berg, 86, Dutch gymnast and Olympian.

=== 15 ===
- William Boddington, 85, American Olympic field hockey player (1932, 1936).
- Ellis Wayne Felker, 48, American man convicted of murder, execution by electric chair.
- Harvey Fraser, 78, Canadian ice hockey player (Chicago Black Hawks).
- Henri Friedlaender, 92, Israeli typographer and book designer.
- William E. Hall, 83, United States Naval Reserve officer and recipient of the Medal of Honor.
- Lovell Harden, 78, American baseball player.
- Alger Hiss, 92, American State Department official and alleged spy.
- John J. Lenzini, Jr., 49, American horse trainer in Thoroughbred flat racing.
- Lila Shanley, 86, American stuntwoman, actress, and athlete, heart failure.
- Les Watt, 72, New Zealand cricketer.
- Ahmed Zaki, 65, Prime Minister of the Maldives.

=== 16 ===
- Reginald Bevins, 88, British politician.
- Dondinho, 79, Brazilian football player and manager.
- Joe Gonzales, 81, American Major League Baseball player (Boston Red Sox).
- Jens Peter Hansen, 69, Danish football player and Olympian (1952).
- Alan Jenkinson, 44, Australian Olympic boxer (1972).
- Masud Karim, 60, Bangladeshi lyricist.
- Liam Naughten, 52, Irish Fine Gael politician, traffic accident.
- Jack Popplewell, 85, English writer and playwright.
- Benjamin Arthur Quarles, 92, American historian, educator, and writer, heart attack.
- Vasil Spasov, 76, Bulgarian football player and manager.

=== 17 ===
- Michele Abruzzo, 91, Italian actor.
- Fabrizio De Chiara, 25, Italian Olympic boxer (1992).
- Gus Kyle, 73, Canadian ice hockey player (New York Rangers, Boston Bruins).
- Norm Mason, 82, Australian rules footballer.
- Karl-Heinz Moehle, 86, German U-boat commander during World War II.
- Huo Shilian, 87, Chinese politician.
- Maude Smith, 91, Canadian figure skater and Olympian (1928).
- Kurt von Ruffin, 95, German actor and opera singer.

=== 18 ===
- Antonije Abramović, 77, Archbishop of the Montenegrin Orthodox Church.
- Bob Bearpark, 53, Canadian soccer coach.
- Zinovy Gerdt, 80, Soviet/Russian actor.
- Douglas Guest, 80, British organist and conductor.
- Charles Hare, 81, British tennis player.
- Raymond Harvey, 76, United States Army lieutenant colonel and recipient of the Medal of Honor.
- James Stuart Holden, 82, American attorney and judge.
- Evelyn Hooker, 89, American psychologist.
- Julius Juhn, 74, Austrian Olympic ice hockey player (1948).
- Greer Lankton, 38, American artist and doll maker, drug overdose.
- John Michaels, 89, American baseball pitcher (Boston Red Sox).
- Charlie Neal, 65, American baseball player (Brooklyn/Los Angeles Dodgers, New York Mets, Cincinnati Reds), heart failure.
- John Vassall, 72, British civil servant and spy, heart attack.
- Étienne Wolff, 92, French biologist.
- Zhu Zuxiang, 80, Chinese educator.

=== 19 ===
- Gabriel Alonso, 73, Spanish football player.
- Harry Anderson, 90, American illustrator.
- Grace Bates, 82, American mathematician.
- Milton Carpenter, 91, American politician.
- Phil Hankinson, 45, American basketball player (Boston Celtics), suicide.
- Nicole Hassler, 55, French figure skater and Olympian (1960, 1964).
- Véra Korène, 95, Russian-French actress and singer.
- Anders Lindh, 67, Swedish Olympic gymnast (1952).

=== 20 ===
- Bert Achong, 67, Trinidadian and Tobagonian scientist, brain tumor.
- Jens Boyesen, 76, Norwegian diplomat and politician.
- Danny Dare, 91, American film director and choreographer.
- Liam Dowling, 65, Irish hurler.
- Gustl Gstettenbaur, 82, German actor.
- Bill Sayles, 79, American baseball player (Boston Red Sox, New York Giants, Brooklyn Dodgers).
- Franciszek Strynkiewicz, 103, Polish sculptor.
- Bill Vernon, 59, American radio personality.

=== 21 ===
- Syed Mohammed Mukhtar Ashraf, Indian Sufi saint, spiritual leader and islamic scholar.
- Sandro Continenza, 76, Italian screenwriter.
- Earl Cook, 87, American baseball player (Detroit Tigers).
- Walter Edward Hoffman, 89, American district judge (United States District Court for the Eastern District of Virginia).
- Chuck Howard, 63, American television executive, and a pioneer in television sports broadcasting, brain cancer.
- Elmo Langley, 68, American NASCAR driver and owner, heart attack.
- Liu Pang-yu, 53, Taiwanese politician, murdered.
- Bernard Rose, 80, British organist, soldier, and academic.
- Abdus Salam, 70, Pakistani physicist, Nobel Prize laureate, progressive supranuclear palsy.

=== 22 ===
- Stephanie Bachelor, 84, American film actress.
- Peter Barbour, 71, Australian intelligence officer and diplomat.
- Garrett Birkhoff, 85, American mathematician.
- Ray Blanton, 66, American businessman and politician.
- Walter Boos, 68, German film editor and director.
- María Casares, 74, Spanish-French actress, colon cancer.
- Willy Derboven, 57, Belgian road bicycle racer.
- Terence Donovan, 60, English photographer and film director, suicide.
- Heinz Hauser, 75, German Olympic skier (1952, 1956).
- Robert Jaulin, 68, French ethnologist.
- Mark Lenard, 72, American actor (Star Trek), multiple myeloma.
- Adeniran Ogunsanya, 78, Nigerian lawyer and politician.
- Wojciech Szymańczyk, 53, Polish Olympic archer (1976).
- Edmund Teske, 85, American photographer.

=== 23 ===
- Mohamed Amin, 53, Kenyan photojournalist, plane crash.
- Aubrey Davis, 75, American basketball player.
- Jean-Paul Elkann, 74, French banker.
- Ken Lane, 83, American musician.
- Charlotte Pierce, 92, American actress.
- Nat Pollard, 81, American baseball player.
- Art Porter, Jr., 35, American jazz saxophonist, drowned.
- Eve Rimmer, 59, New Zealand paralympic athlete.
- Idries Shah, 72, Indian Sufi writer and teacher.
- Gordon Styles, 76, Australian rules footballer.
- Tim Wilson, 42, American gridiron football player (Houston Oilers, New Orleans Saints).

=== 24 ===
- Joe Bailey, 75, Australian rules footballer.
- Loren Bain, 74, American baseball player (New York Giants).
- Paul Coche, 92, French Olympic modern pentathlete (1928).
- Edison Denisov, 67, Russian Soviet composer.
- Paulos Mar Gregorios, 74, Indian Metropolitan.
- William Johnstone, 88, American actor.
- Tupua Leupena, 74, Governor-General of Tuvalu.
- Sorley MacLean, 85, Scottish Gaelic poet.
- Louis-Frédéric Nussbaum, 73, French Indologist.
- Michael O'Hehir, 76, Irish sports commentator and journalist.
- Titus Ozon, 69, Romanian football player, manager, and Olympian (1952).

=== 25 ===
- Ricardo López Aranda, 61, Spanish playwright.
- Don Dobie, 69, Australian politician.
- Hans Jura, 75, Austrian cinematographer.
- Margaret Rioch, 89, American psychotherapist.
- Charles Stokes, 94, American politician, jurist, and lawyer, cancer.

=== 26 ===
- Michael Bentine, 74, British comedian, prostate cancer.
- Norman Le Brocq, 74, British communist, trade union activist, and resistance leader during World War II.
- Isabella Henriette van Eeghen, 83, Dutch historian.
- Guido Gratton, 64, Italian football player.
- Joan Hammond, 84, Australian operatic soprano.
- Philippe Hirschhorn, 50, Latvian violinist, brain cancer.
- Elrey Borge Jeppesen, 89, American aviation pioneer.
- Larry Knorr, 79, American football player (Detroit Lions).
- Bill McElwain, 93, American gridiron football player (Chicago Cardinals, Chicago Bears), and coach.
- Roy Moore, 64, Australian Olympic cyclist (1956).
- Narinder Singh Randhawa, 69, Indian agricultural scientist and writer.
- Paul Rand, 82, American graphic designer, cancer.

=== 27 ===
- Balot, 70, Filipino comedian and actor, complications from diabetes.
- Nicholas L. Bissell, Jr., 49, American attorney and fraudster, suicide.
- Aloysio Borges, 78, Brazilian modern pentathlete and Olympian (1948, 1952).
- Vladimir Firm, 73, Croatian football player and Olympian (1952).
- Jack Penn, 87, South African plastic surgeon, sculptor and author.

=== 28 ===
- Charles Bressler, 70, American tenor.
- Charlie Challenger, 78, Australian rules footballer.
- Harlan Hanson, 71, American educator and director of the Advanced Placement Program.
- John Jaffurs, 73, American football player (Washington Redskins), and coach.
- Robert J. McCloskey, 74, American diplomat.
- Don McNeill, 78, American tennis champion.
- Anna Pollak, 84, English opera singer.
- Don Reed, 63, American politician.

=== 29 ===
- Dick Bilda, 77, American gridiron football player (Green Bay Packers).
- Jordan Cronenweth, 61, American cinematographer (Blade Runner, Peggy Sue Got Married, Altered States), Parkinson's disease.
- Dan Flavin, 63, American minimalist artist, diabetes, diabetes.
- Roy Hopkins, 51, American football player (Houston Oilers).
- Denis Jenkinson, 75, British motorsports journalist.
- Dragoslav Srejović, 65, Serbian archaeologist, cultural anthropologist and historian.
- Bob Steuber, 75, American gridiron football player.

=== 30 ===
- Petar Ozretić, 76, Croatian Olympic rower (1948).
- Ted Petoskey, 85, American athlete, coach in three sports and athletic director.
- Claude Saluden, 59, French Olympic boxer (1956).
- Kacem Slimani, 48, Moroccan football player.
- Václav Sršeň, 71, Czech football player.
- Max Thompson, 74, United States Army soldier and recipient of the Medal of Honor.
- Tiny Tim, 64, American musician ("Tiptoe Through the Tulips", "Livin' in the Sunlight, Lovin' in the Moonlight"), heart attack.
- Peng Wan-ru, 47, Taiwanese politician, murder, homicide.
- John Williamson, 45, American basketball player (New Jersey/York Nets, Indiana Pacers, Washington Bullets), kidney failure.
