= Stiles =

Stiles or Styles may refer to:

== Places ==
- Ezra Stiles College, a residential college of Yale University, U.S.
- Stiles, County Antrim, a townland in County Antrim, Northern Ireland, UK
- Stiles, Texas, U.S.
- Stiles, Wisconsin, U.S.
  - Stiles (community), Wisconsin, an unincorporated community
- Stiles, Pennsylvania, U.S.
- Mark Stiles Unit, a state prison in Jefferson County, Texas

== People ==
=== Surnames ===
==== Stiles ====
- Aeriel Stiles, American guitarist and songwriter
- B.J. Stiles (born 1933), American retired nonprofit leader
- Baxter B. Stiles (1824–1878), American politician
- Bert Stiles (1920–1944), American short story writer
- Billy Stiles (1871–1908), American outlaw
- Charles Wardell Stiles (1867–1941), American zoologist
- Chester Stiles (born 1970), American criminal
- Cyril Stiles (1904–1985), New Zealand rower (a.k.a. Bob Stiles)
- Dan Stiles, American artist and designer
- Danny Stiles (1923–2011), American radio personality
- Darron Stiles (born 1973), American professional golfer
- Edward H. Stiles (1836–1921), American politician, lawyer and writer
- Ezra Stiles (disambiguation)
  - Ezra Stiles (1727–1795), American academic and president of Yale College
  - Ezra C. Stiles (died 1974), American landscape architect
- Florence Ward Stiles (1897–1981), American architect and librarian
- George Stiles (disambiguation)
  - George Stiles (composer) (born 1961), English composer
  - George Stiles (politician) (fl. 1816–1819), American politician
  - George P. Stiles (1814–1885), Justice of the Supreme Court of the Utah Territory
- Grady Stiles (1937–1992), American freak show performer
- Harold Stiles (1863–1946), British surgeon
- Henry Reed Stiles (1832–1909), American physician
- Jackie Stiles (born 1978), American basketball player
- Jason Stiles (born 1973), American football player
- Jesse Stiles (born 1978), American electronic musician, record producer, sound designer, and electronic artist
- John Dodson Stiles (1822–1896), American lawyer and politician
- John Stiles, Canadian writer
- Julia Stiles (born 1981), American actress
- Kristine Stiles (born 1947), American global contemporary art historian
- Lilian Stiles-Allen (1896–1982), British soprano of the mid 20th century
- Lynn Stiles (born 1941), former American football player, coach, and executive
- Marit Stiles (born 1969), Canadian politician
- Mark Stiles (born 1948), American politician
- Nancy Stiles, American school nutrition manager and politician
- Neil Stiles, British magazine executive
- Nick Stiles (born 1973), Australian professional rugby union coach and a former player
- Nobby Stiles (1942–2020), English footballer
- Norman C. Stiles (1834–1907), American inventor
- Norman Stiles (born 1942), television writer
- Patti Stiles, actor and improvisation artist living in Australia
- Rollie Stiles (1906–2007), American baseball player
- Ryan Stiles (born 1959), American-Canadian actor and comedian
- Sarah Stiles (born 1979), American singer and actress
- Stephen Stiles (1935–2023), Canadian politician
- Steve Stiles (1943–2020), American science-fiction artist and writer
- T. J. Stiles (born 1964), American writer
- Tara Stiles (born 1981), American model turned yoga instructor
- Theodore L. Stiles (1848–1925), justice of the Washington Supreme Court
- Thomas Stiles, a captain in the Royalist army
- Tony Stiles (born 1959), Canadian retired professional ice hockey player
- Victoria Stiles (born 1978), Washington, D.C. makeup artist
- Wally Stiles (born 1950), Canadian politician
- William Henry Stiles (1808–1865), American lawyer and politician

==== Styles ====
- A.J. Styles (born 1977), American professional wrestler
- Alfred William Styles (1873–1926), Australian accountant, trade unionist, and politician
- Archie Styles (footballer, born 1949), English footballer
- Darren Styles (born 1975), British record producer and songwriter
- David Styles (born 1974), birth name of Styles P, American rapper
- Edwin Styles (1899–1960), British film actor
- Frank Showell Styles (1908–2005), English writer and mountaineer
- George Styles (military officer), British bomb disposal expert
- Gordon Styles (footballer) (1920–1996), former Australian rules footballer
- Gordon George Styles (born 1964), British engineer and entrepreneur
- Harry Styles (born 1994), English singer, member of One Direction
- James Styles (1841–1913), English-born Australian politician
- Joey Styles (born 1971), American professional wrestler
- Karintha Styles (born 1977), American journalist
- Kaye Styles (born 1981), Belgian singer, songwriter, and TV personality
- Keni Styles (born 1981), British pornographic actor
- Lance Styles (born 1951), Australian rules footballer
- Lena Styles (1899–1956), American baseball player
- Lorenzo Styles (born 1974), American football player
- Lorenzo Styles Jr. (born 2002), American football player
- Mailangi Styles (born 1984), Australian rugby league footballer
- Margretta Styles (1930–2005), American nurse
- Mary Styles Harris (born 1949), African American geneticist
- Peter Styles (politician) (born 1953), Australian politician
- Peter Styles (geologist), British geologist
- Rob Styles (born 1964), English football referee
- Showell Styles, Welsh writer and mountaineer
- Sonny Styles (born 2004), American football player
- Stephanie Styles (born 1991), American actress, singer, and dancer
- Toy Styles (born 1974), American author, screenwriter and film producer
- Walter Styles (1889–1965), British soldier and Member of Parliament
- Wes Styles, American singer-songwriter
- William Styles (1874–1940), British sport shooter

=== Given names ===
- Stiles H. Bronson, an American politician
- Stiles O. Clements (1883–1966), American architect
- Stiles Curtis (1805–1882), Warden of the Borough of Norwalk, Connecticut
- Stiles French (1801–1881), American teacher
- Stiles P. Jones (1822-1861), American lawyer and politician
- Stiles White, American screenwriter, special effects artist, and film director

== Characters ==
- Dr. Stiles, the main character in the video game series Trauma Center: Under the Knife
- Edgar Stiles, a character on the popular drama 24
- Jason Stiles (Gilmore Girls), Gilmore Girls character
- Jo Stiles, Emmerdale fictional character
- Rupert 'Stiles' Stilinski, a character from 1985 film Teen Wolf
- Stiles Stilinski, a character from the 2011 television series Teen Wolf
- Tod Stiles, Route 66 television series character
- Willard Stiles, titular character of Willard (1971 film)

== See also ==
- Stile
- Style (disambiguation)
- Stile (disambiguation)
