= Style =

Style, or styles may refer to:

== Semiotics ==
- Style (visual arts)
- Style (form of address), titles or honorifics, including Chinese courtesy names
- Style (sociolinguistics), variation in language use to which social meanings are attributed
- Architectural style, the features that make a building or structure historically identifiable
- House style (disambiguation), standards for writing, graphic design or illustration
- Investment style, characteristics of an investment strategy
- Writing style, the manner in which a writer addresses readers
- Film style

== Informatics ==
- Cascade Style Sheet (CSS)

== Film and television shows ==
- Style (2001 film), a Hindi film starring Sharman Joshi, Riya Sen, Sahil Khan and Shilpi Mudgal
- Style (2002 film), a Tamil drama film
- Style (2004 film), a Burmese film
- Style (2006 film), a Telugu film starring Lawrence Raghavendra and Prabhu Deva Sundaram
- Style (2016 film), a Malayalam film
- Style (TV series), a 2009 Korean television series
- Style (DVD), a DVD featuring Girls Aloud
- Style with Elsa Klensch, a CNN fashion series from 1980 to 2000

== Television channels ==
- Style Network, a now-defunct US TV channel which was rebranded as Esquire Network in 2013
- TVN Style, a Polish television channel

== Literature ==
- Style (book), a 1955 book on good prose by F. L. Lucas
- Style (journal), an academic journal of style, stylistics and poetics in literature
- Style (magazine), a South African women's magazine published between the 1980s and 2006
- Style, a 1998 fashion book by Elsa Klensch
- Style: An Anti-Textbook, a 1974 monograph by Richard A. Lanham
- Style, an 1897 book by Sir Walter Raleigh
- Style: Toward Clarity and Grace, a 1990 writing guide by Joseph M. Williams

== Music ==
=== Bands ===
- Style (band)

=== Albums ===
- Style (Cameo album) (1983)
- Style (Luna Sea album) (1996)
- Style (Namie Amuro album) (2003)
- Styles (Shapeshifter EP) (2003)
- Style (Super Junior-D&E album) (2018)

=== Songs ===
- "Style" (2hollis song) (2025)
- "Style" (Hearts2Hearts song) (2025)
- "Style" (Kana Nishino song) (2008)
- "Style" (Mis-Teeq song) (2003)
- "Style" (Orbital song) (1999)
- "Style" (Taylor Swift song) (2014)
- "Style (Get Glory in This Hand)", a 2005 single by High and Mighty Color
- "Style", a song by Itzy from Ringo
- "Style", a song by Prince from Emancipation
- "Style", a single by Rania
- "Style", a song from the film Robin and the 7 Hoods

== Biology ==
- Style (botany), a stalk structure in female flower parts
- Style (zoology), a digestive structure in the midgut of many bivalve molluscs

== People ==
=== Style ===
- Charles Style (born 1954), former Royal Navy officer
- Style of Eye (born 1979), Swedish DJ, record producer and songwriter
- Style Scott (1956–2014), Jamaican reggae drummer
- Thomas Style (disambiguation)
- William Style (1603–1679), English legal author
- Sir William Style, 9th Baronet (1826–1904), English first-class cricketer

=== Styles ===
- Alfred William Styles (1873–1926), British-born accountant, trade unionist and politician in South Australia
- Callum Styles (born 2000), English-born Hungary international footballer
- Carey Wentworth Styles (1825–1897), American lawyer, journalist and newspaper editor
- Darren Styles, English DJ and record producer
- Dorothy Geneva Styles (1922–1984), American composer, mathematician, organist, and poet
- Edwin Styles (1899–1960), British stage comedian, pantomime actor, radio and TV performer and film actor
- George Styles (British Army officer) (1928–2006), British Army officer and bomb disposal expert
- George Styles (footballer) (1904–1984), Australian rules footballer
- Gordon George Styles (born 1964), British engineer and entrepreneur
- Harry Styles (born 1994), English singer, songwriter, and actor
- Hugh Styles (born 1974), British Olympic sailor
- James Styles (1841–1913), British-born contractor, civil engineer and politician in Victoria, Australia
- Jesse Styles, American politician
- John Styles (1782–1849), English Congregational minister and animal rights writer
- Karintha Styles (born 1979), American sports journalist and author
- Keni Styles (born 1981), Thai-British soldier and pornographic actor
- Lorenzo Styles (born 1974), American football player
- Lorenzo Styles Jr. (born 2002), American football player
- Margretta Styles (1930–2005), American nurse, author, educator and nursing school dean
- Peter Styles (geologist) (born c. 1950), British geologist
- Peter Styles (politician) (born 1953), Australian politician
- Ray Styles (1988–2020), Ghanaian artist
- Showell Styles (1908–2005), British writer and mountaineer
- Sonny Styles (born 2004), American football player
- Stephanie Styles (born 1991), American actress, singer, and dancer
- Toy Styles, American author, screenwriter and film producer
- Walter Styles (1889–1965), British soldier, Member of Parliament for Sevenoaks
- Wes Styles, stage name of American singer-songwriter Wesley Garren
- William Styles (1874–1940), British Olympic sport shooter
- Styles Hutchins (1852–1950), American lawyer and legislator
- Styles P, stage name of David Styles (born 1974), American rapper

=== Other people ===
- Ghost Style, stage name of Brandon Ho (born 1973), Canadian rapper and producer based in Hong Kong
- "Style," a pen name of Neil Strauss (born 1969), American author and journalist
- A.J. Styles, ring name of American wrestler Allen Jones (born 1977)
- Kaye Styles, stage name of Belgian singer, songwriter and TV personality Kwasi Gyasi
- "Styles," nickname of April Phumo (1937–2011), South African football player and coach

== Other uses ==
- Aeros Style, a Ukrainian paraglider
- Hairstyle, the styling of hair
- Style, the part of a sundial's gnomon which casts the shadow
- Style, a traditional design feature of a typeface
- Styles Strait, Antarctica

== See also ==
- Alternative lifestyle
- Automotive styling
- Lifestyle (disambiguation)
- Stile (disambiguation)
- Stiles (disambiguation)
- Style guide
- Stylish (disambiguation)
- Stylist (disambiguation)
