= Rumstick =

Rumstick may refer to:

- Ezra Rumstick
- Rumstick (card game), English name for the game of Romestecq
