= Biddlecomb =

Biddlecomb is a surname. Notable people with the surname include:

- Captain Isaac Biddlecomb
- Virginia Stanton Biddlecomb

== See also ==
- Biddlecombe
