= George Styles =

George Styles may refer to:

- George Styles (British Army officer) (1928–2006), British Army officer and bomb disposal expert
- George Styles (footballer) (1904–1984), Australian rules footballer

== See also ==
- George Stiles (disambiguation)
