= Gordon Styles =

Gordon Styles may refer to:

- Gordon Styles (footballer), Australian rules footballer
- Gordon George Styles, British engineer and entrepreneur
