= Glantz =

Glantz is a surname. Notable people with the surname include:

- Aaron Glantz (1977–), American journalist and author
- Abraham Glantz (1907–1998), South African cricketer
- David M. Glantz (1942–), American military historian
- Ezra Glantz (1945–), American handball goalkeeper
- Leib Glantz (1898–1964), Ukrainian lyrical tenor
- Margo Glantz (1930–), Mexican writer, essayist, critic, and academic
- Matthew Glantz (1971–), American professional poker player
- Nathan Glantz (1878-1937), American jazz bandleader
- Peter Glantz (1975–), American director of theater and film
- Stanton Glantz (1946–), professor of medicine at the University of California, San Francisco
