= Frances K. Hutchinson Medal =

Frances K. Hutchison Medal
- Description: Distinguished service to conservation of national importance
- Country: United States
- Presented by: Garden Club of America (GCA)

The Frances K. Hutchison Medal is awarded by the Garden Club of America (GCA) "to figures of national importance for distinguished service to conservation." In 1940 Helen Thorne was the inaugural medallist for her leadership in the California redwood protection achieved by the GCA and the Save the Redwoods League. The medal is named in honor of Frances Kinsley Hutchison (1857–1936), wife of the Chicago philanthropist Charles L. Hutchinson (1854–1924).

== Frances K. Hutchinson, gardener, conservationist, and author ==
Frances Hutchinson served as president of the Illinois chapter of the Wild Flower Preservation Society. In 1915 she founded the Geneva Lake Garden Club, which in 1920 joined the Garden Club of America. In 1926 she attempted to donate Wychwood, the Hutchinson's 73-acre estate on the north shore of Geneva Lake, as a permanent nature preserve of the state of Wisconsin. However, by 1933, she reached an agreement with the University of Chicago to donate the land to the university with a generous 25-year trust to maintain the property, Frances Hutchinson was the director of Wychwood's board of trustees until her death in 1936. Ezra Jacob Kraus set up a field lab on the property and in the 1930s and 1940s developed new varieties of chrysanthemums and lilies adapted to harsh winters. When the trust ended in 1957, the University of Chicago sold the property in 3 parcels, with one parcel each bought by Philip K. Wrigley, George F. Getz Jr. (1908–1992), and Clarence B. Mitchell (whose father was John J. "Jack" Mitchell). In 1932, the Board of Directors of the Wisconsin State Horticultural Society gave a certificate of honorary recognition to Frances K. Hutchinson as an eminent horticulturist serving the state of Wisconsin. The citation on the certificate praises her for her commitment "... to dedicate 'Wychwood' as a sanctuary for native plants and birds, and to promote organizations for their protection."

Frances Kinsley Hutchinson wrote a trilogy about the Wychwood estate. In 1909 A. C. McClurg & Company published her account of the travels by motorcar that she and her husband experienced in the Balkans.
