= Way of life =

Way of life may refer to:

- Lifestyle (sociology), a term to describe the way a person lives
- Modus vivendi, a Latin phrase meaning way of life or way of living
- The culture of a nation or tribe

== Books ==
- A Way of Life: Over Thirty Years of Blood, Sweat and Tears, autobiography by Reginald Kray
- A Way of Life, Like Any Other, novel by Darcy O'Brien, 1977

== Film ==
- A Way of Life (2004 film), a British film
- A Way of Life (2016 film), a 2016 American short film
- A Way of Life (2019 film), a Canadian drama film
- Ada... A Way of Life, a 2010 Indian Hindi-language musical film
- Jeene Ki Raah (lit. 'Way of Life'), a 1969 Indian Hindi-language drama film by L. V. Prasad

== Music ==
=== Albums ===
- A Way of Life (The Family Dogg album), a 1969 album by The Family Dogg
- A Way of Life (Suicide album), a 1988 album by Suicide
- Way of Life (album), a 2010 album by Jimmy Cozier
- One Way of Life, a 1998 album by The Levellers

=== Songs ===
- A Way of Life (song), a song from the album of the same name
- "Way of Life" (Lil Wayne song), 2002
- "Way of Life" (Slinkee Minx song), 2007
- Way of Life, a song by Gentle Giant from the 1973 album In a Glass House

== Video games ==
- Way of Life, a DLC for the 2012 grand-strategy game Crusader Kings II

== See also ==
- Lifestyle (disambiguation)
- Way (disambiguation)
- Life (disambiguation)
- Modus Vivendi (disambiguation)
- My Way of Life, a song popularized by Frank Sinatra
