= Biddlecombe =

Biddlecombe is a surname of Anglo-Saxon English origin. Notable people with the surname include:

- George Biddlecombe (1807–1878), English naval officer and author
- Terry Biddlecombe (1941–2014), English National Hunt racing jockey in the 1960s and 1970s
- William Biddlecombe, Mayor of, and MP for, Poole, England

== See also ==
- Biddlecomb, surname
