= Chitando =

Chitando is a Zimbabwean surname. Notable people with the surname include:

- Ezra Chitando, Zimbabwean religious studies academic
- Winston Chitando, Zimbabwean politician
