= White Island (Enderby Land) =

Island in Enderby Land, Antarctica

- Location within Antarctica

Geography
- Location: Antarctica
- Coordinates: 66°44′S 48°35′E
- Area: 200 km^{2} (77 sq mi)

Administration
- Administered under the Antarctic Treaty System

Demographics
- Population: Uninhabited

White Island is a 24-kilometre-long (13 nmi) and 9-kilometre-wide (5 nmi) ice-covered island in Enderby Land, Antarctica. 15-kilometre-wide (8 nmi) Styles Strait separates it from Sakellari Peninsula. Discovered and called Hvitøya ("White Island") by Hjalmar Riiser-Larsen in January 1930, its existence was considered doubtful for a number of years but was confirmed by the Soviet expedition in the Lena in March 1957, and by ANARE (Australian National Antarctic Research Expeditions) led by D.F. Styles in the Thala Dan in February 1960.
