= Israel's Messenger =

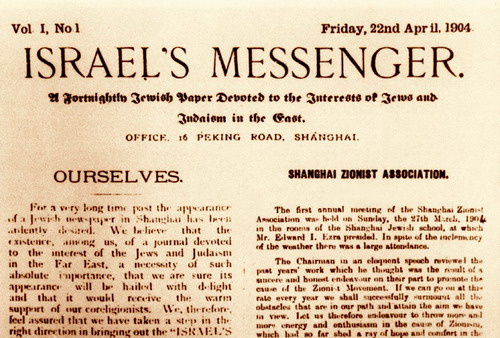
- Founder: N.E.B. Ezra
- Founded: 1904
- Ceased publication: 1941
- Language: English
- Headquarters: Shanghai
- Country: China

Israel's Messenger
- Traditional Chinese: 以色列信使報
- Simplified Chinese: 以色列信使报
Transcriptions
Standard Mandarin
- Hanyu Pinyin: Yǐsèliè Xìnshǐbào
- Wade–Giles: I3-se4-lieh4 Hsin4-shih3-pao4

Youtai Yuebao
- Traditional Chinese: 猶太月報
- Simplified Chinese: 犹太月报
- Literal meaning: Jewish Monthly
Transcriptions
Standard Mandarin
- Hanyu Pinyin: Yóutài Yuèbào
- Wade–Giles: Yu2-t'ai4 Yüeh4-pao4

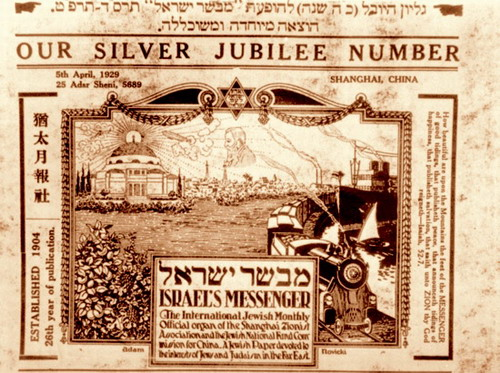
Silver jubilee issue, 5 April 1939

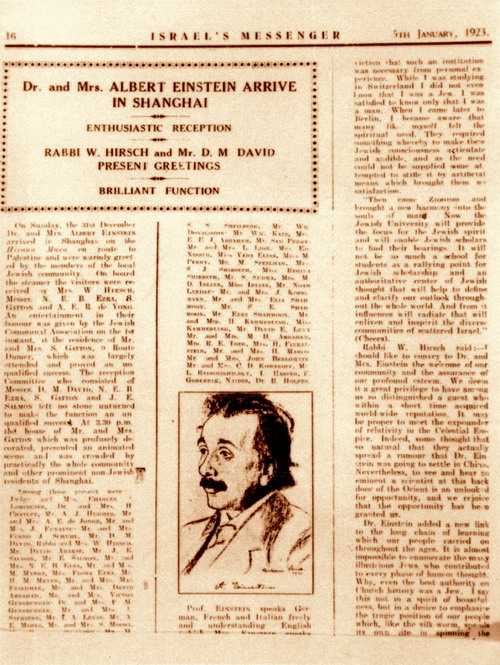
Article on Albert Einstein's visit to Shanghai, 5 January 1923

Israel's Messenger (Chinese: 以色列信使報), also known in Chinese as Youtai Yuebao (Chinese: 猶太月報), was an English-language newspaper published in Shanghai from 1904 to 1941. It was established by N.E.B. Ezra, who served as the paper's Editor-in-Chief for more than 30 years until his death in 1936, as the official newspaper of the Shanghai Association. It was one of China's oldest and most sophisticated Jewish periodicals, which also influenced the Jewish press.

== History ==
Israel's Messenger was founded in 1904 by the Sephardi Jewish businessman Nissim Elias Benjamin Ezra (1883–1936) as the official mouthpiece of the Shanghai Zionist Association, which had been established by Ezra the year before. Ezra served as the paper's Editor-in-Chief for more than 30 years until his death in 1936. In addition to promoting Zionism, the paper reported on the activities of the Jewish communities in Shanghai and the rest of China, as well as world events. It was published fortnightly, and later monthly.

Israel's Messenger was one of China's oldest and most sophisticated Jewish periodicals. It was also circulated in the United States, where it successfully positioned itself as the most authoritative Jewish voice from East Asia. The chief editor of the newspaper and other Zionist scholars cooperated with Imperial Japan. Japanese military officer Koreshige Inuzuka said he tried to use the Jewish media, including Israel's Messenger, to influence American opinion. Owing to financial difficulties, publication was suspended between February 1910 and September 1918, but the paper survived until its final issue appeared on 17 October 1941.

The newspaper influenced the Jewish press in India. The Sargon brothers (Benjamin, Joseph, and David) of Bombay, who were nephews of N.E.B. Ezra, grew up reading Israel's Messenger. Greatly influenced by Ezra's journalistic concepts, the brothers edited the Jewish Advocate (later renamed the Jewish Tribune) in the 1930s, bringing it to a much higher level of professionalism than the older Jewish newspapers of Bombay.

== Bibliography ==
- Bei Gao (2013). Shanghai Sanctuary: Chinese and Japanese Policy Toward European Jewish Refugees During World War II. Oxford University Press. ISBN 978-0-19-984090-8.
- Cesarani, David (2014). Port Jews: Jewish Communities in Cosmopolitan Maritime Trading Centres, 1550-1950. Routledge. ISBN 978-1-135-29246-1.
- Goldstein, Jonathan (1998). The Jews of China. M.E. Sharpe. ISBN 978-0-7656-3631-7.
- Ristaino, Marcia Reynders (2003). Port of Last Resort: The Diaspora Communities of Shanghai. Stanford University Press. ISBN 978-0-8047-5023-3.
