= Strala yoga =

Strala yoga is a modern form of yoga that was founded in 2008 by Tara Stiles.

== History ==
The New York City Strala studio was founded by Tara Stiles and her husband Michael Taylor in 2008. The name stems from the Swedish word "stråla" meaning radiate light. The yoga style was first introduced on Stiles' YouTube channel. Strala has partner studios in Seattle, Singapore and Barcelona, and classes are offered in 20 countries around the world.

== About ==
Strala focuses on an overall concept of moving with ease. Natural movement, eastern influences of tai chi and shiatsu, and a positive, easy-going atmosphere are elements in Strala. Strala teachers are called "guides".
