= Star Rapid =

Manufacturing company in China

- Formerly: Star Prototype
- Founded: 2005
- Founder: Gordon George Styles
- Area served: Global
- Website: www.starrapid.com

Star Rapid is a global rapid prototyping, rapid tooling and low-volume manufacturing company located in Zhongshan, Guangdong Province, China. The company was founded in 2005 by Gordon George Styles, a British engineer and U.K. rapid prototyping veteran who now serves as president and CEO. Star Rapid offers a range of advanced manufacturing services including plastic injection molding, CNC machining, metal 3D printing, pressure die casting, Vacuum casting (elastomers) and a range of finishing services targeting the consumer, automotive, medical and aerospace industries. The company has a 60,000 ft^{2} facility and more than 250 global employees. Today, they have served over 2,400+ companies worldwide across 60+ countries.

Throughout the company's history, it has been involved in multiple high-profile projects, from providing parts to restore the historic Charlotte-Genesee Lighthouse on Lake Ontario to components for the Florida Institute for Human and Machine Cognition's Mina v2 exoskeleton, which competed in the first ever Cybathlon.

Star Rapid has sales offices in the United States, United Kingdom, Australia and Germany. The company has created parts for more than 400 American companies and was named a "Best Online 3D Printing Service" by ALL3DP.
