= Stylist =

Stylist may refer to:

== Occupations ==
- Automotive stylist or car stylist, a person involved in designing the appearance and ergonomics of automobiles
- Food stylist, a person who makes food look attractive in photographs
- Hair stylist, a person who cuts and styles hair
- Literary stylist, a master or critic of writing style
- Personal stylist, a person concerned with the style of a single individual
- Wardrobe stylist or fashion stylist, a person who chooses clothing and accessories

== Other uses ==
- Stylist (magazine), a British fashion magazine

== See also ==
- Style (disambiguation)
