= Stylish =

Stylish may refer to:

- Stylish (software), a web browser extension
- Stylish..., a 2003 album by Lee Hyori
- "Stylish", a track on the 2018 Loona album [+ +]
- Stylish with Jenna Lyons, a reality TV series

== See also ==
- Style (disambiguation)
