= Modus Vivendi (disambiguation) =

Modus vivendi is a Latin phrase meaning "way of life".

Modus Vivendi may refer to:

- Modus Vivendi (070 Shake album), 2020
- Modus Vivendi (Tad Morose album), 2003

== See also ==
- Way of life (disambiguation)
