= Spiccato =

Bowing technique for string instruments

Spiccato [spikˈkaːto] is a bowing technique for string instruments in which the bow appears to bounce lightly upon the string. The term comes from the past participle of the Italian verb spiccare, meaning "to separate". The terms saltando and sautillé describe similar techniques.

David Popper: Elfentanz
David Popper's "Elfentanz" is a perpetuum mobile piece for cello and piano consisting of continuous spiccato. Hans Goldstein, cello, Mellicia Straaf, piano.

Ezra Jenkinson: Elfentanz
A simple piece by Ezra Jenkinson for violin and piano with the same title and using the same effect. Bernard Chevalier, violin, Marsha Chevalier, piano.

== Technique ==
In typically consistent rhythms (of quavers or semiquavers, or quicker repeated sounds), the bow is held in a more relaxed manner and allowed to bounce, resulting in a series of short, distinct notes. This occurs because of the elasticity of the string and the natural springiness of the bow. The ability to create the effect is largely tempo-dependent. In slower tempos, a spiccato can also be manufactured using the fingers and wrist to deliberately manipulate how the bow falls to the string.

The speed with which the spiccato is performed depends on bow placement. At the balance point – about a third from the frog – the spiccato will be slow, while above the middle of the bow the speed will increase. The speed can also be controlled by varying the height of the bow above the string: the higher the bow bounces, the longer the time required for the bow to return to the string, and therefore the slower the resulting spiccato.

The character of the spiccato can be varied by altering the tilt and placement of the bow to use more or fewer hairs. When using the full bow hair, the bow bounces more and has a shorter character, while when the bow hair is angled, the character of the spiccato becomes more mellow and longer.

== History ==
The terms spiccato and staccato were regarded as equivalent before the mid-18th century. For example, in Sébastien de Brossard's Dictionnaire de musique, 1703 and Michel Corrette's L'École d'Orphée, 1738, it meant "simply detached or separated as opposed to legato".

The distinctive use of the term spiccato for the bouncing bowstroke emerged in the later 18th century. Although it was an important technique for 19th-century violinists, its use increased significantly in the 20th century.

The ability to perform spiccato was facilitated by the development of the Tourte bow – the modern bow, in which the bow had a concave curve, developed by François Tourte partly in collaboration with Giovanni Battista Viotti.
