= Stile (disambiguation) =

A stile is a structure such as steps allowing pedestrians to cross a hedge or fence.

Stile may also refer to:

== Arts and media ==
=== Music ===
- Stile antico ("ancient style"), a style of music composition
- Stile concitato ("agitated style"), a Baroque style of music
- Stile moderno ("modern style") or seconda pratica, a style of music composition

=== Other media ===
- Stile Project or StileNET, formerly a counter-culture website
- Stile, a side of a backdrop in a theatre: see Flats (theatre)
- Stile, the main character in the Apprentice Adept series by Piers Anthony

== Structural elements ==
- A vertical piece of wood in frame and panel construction
- A rigid beam supporting the rungs of a ladder

== Other uses ==
- Ashok Leyland STiLE, a multi-purpose vehicle
- Chapel Stile, a hamlet in the parish of Lakes, Cumbria, in northwest England
- High Stile, a mountain in the western part of the Lake District in northwest England
- Stile Education, a science education company founded by Alan Finkel

== See also ==
- Style (disambiguation)
- Stiles (disambiguation)
