= Lifestyle (disambiguation) =

A lifestyle is the way a person lives.

Lifestyle may also refer to:

- Otium, ancient Roman concept of a lifestyle
- Style of life (German: Lebensstil), dealing with the dynamics of personality

== Business and economy ==
- Lifestyle business, a business that is set up and run with the aim of sustaining a particular level of income
- Lifestyle center, a commercial development that combines the traditional retail functions of a shopping mall with leisure amenities
- Lifestyle (department store), an Indian retail fashion brand owned by the Dubai-based Landmark Group
- Lifestyle product, a product that symbolises or reflects a person's way of life, values, and interests, often excluding and/or exceeding basic functionality

== Film and television ==
=== Channels ===
- Lifestyle (Australian TV channel), an Australian subscription television station
- Lifestyle (British TV channel), a defunct British television station
- Lifestyle (Philippine TV channel), a Philippine lifestyle and entertainment cable channel owned by ABS-CBN

=== Series and documentaries ===
- Lifestyle (GR series), a weekly entertainment news show that is broadcast on Alter Channel
- Lifestyles of the Rich and Famous, a TV series often abbreviated as "Lifestyles"
- The Lifestyle (1999), an American documentary about swinging in the United States

== Music ==
- Lifestyle (album), a 2000 album by the band Silkworm
- "Lifestyle" (Rich Gang song), 2014
- "Lifestyle" (Jason Derulo song), 2021
- "Lifestyle", a song by Lisa from the 2025 album Alter Ego
- "Lifestyle", a song by Joe Satriani from the 2004 album Is There Love in Space?
- "Lifestyle", a song by The Original 7ven from the 2011 album Condensate
- "Lifestyle", a song by Yo Gotti from the 2016 mixtape White Friday (CM9)
- "Lifestyle", a song by ¥$ featuring Lil Wayne from the 2024 album Vultures 2

== Other uses ==
- Life & Style (magazine)
- LifeStyles Condoms, a brand of condom made by the Australian company Ansell Limited
- Swinging (sexual practice), also referred to as "the lifestyle"

== See also ==
- Lifestylism, a pejorative term to describe fringe anarcho politics and ethical groups
- Life (disambiguation)
- Style (disambiguation)
- Way of life (disambiguation)
- Jeevana Chaitra (lit. 'Life Style'), a 1992 Indian Telugu-language film
