= Reg Goodes =

Australian rules footballer

Personal information
- Full name: Reg Goodes
- Born: 28 July 1928
- Died: 7 November 1996 (aged 68)
- Original team: Highett
- Height: 188 cm (6 ft 2 in)
- Weight: 86 kg (190 lb)

Playing career^{1}
Years	Club	Games (Goals)
1950	South Melbourne	1 (0)
- ^{1} Playing statistics correct to the end of 1950.

Reg Goodes (28 July 1928 – 7 November 1996) was an Australian rules footballer who played with South Melbourne in the Victorian Football League (VFL).
