= Abraham Glantz =

South African cricketer

Personal information
- Born: 24 April 1907; Cape Town, Cape Colony
- Died: 10 July 1998 (aged 91); Wynberg, Cape Town, Western Cape, South Africa
- Batting: Right-handed
- Role: Wicket-keeper

Domestic team information
- Years: Team
- 1929-30 to 1939-40: Western Province

Career statistics
| Competition | First-class |
|---|---|
| Matches | 39 |
| Runs scored | 533 |
| Batting average | 11.84 |
| 100s/50s | 0/1 |
| Top score | 53 not out |
| Balls bowled | 0 |
| Wickets | – |
| Bowling average | – |
| 5 wickets in innings | – |
| 10 wickets in match | – |
| Best bowling | – |
| Catches/stumpings | 59/42 |
- Source: Cricinfo, 1 September 2018

Abraham Glantz (24 April 1907 – 10 July 1998) was a South African cricketer who played first-class cricket for Western Province from 1929 to 1940.

After making his first-class debut in the first match of the 1929–30 Currie Cup season, Glantz remained Western Province's regular wicket-keeper until World War II.
