= James L. Nelson =

American writer (born 1962)

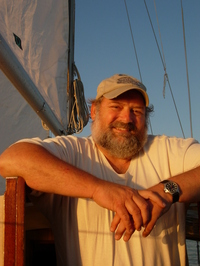
- Nelson's author photo, used in the Norsemen Saga books
- Born: 1962 (age 63–64); Lewiston, Maine, U.S.
- Occupations: Writer, historian
- Spouse: Lisa Nelson
- Children: Elizabeth, Nathaniel, Jonathan, Abigail
- Writing career
- Language: English
- Years active: 1997–present
- Genres: Historical fiction, nautical fiction, modern thriller
- Notable awards: W.Y. Boyd Literary Award for Excellence in Military Fiction
- Website: www.jameslnelson.com

James L. Nelson (born 1962) is an American historical nautical novelist.

== Early life ==
Nelson was born in Lewiston, Maine in 1962. He expressed an interest in boats from a young age, building a skipjack in ninth grade and a canoe in eleventh. In 1980, Nelson graduated from Lewiston High School. He attended the University of Massachusetts Amherst, Amherst, Massachusetts for two years, and then transferred to UCLA, with the ambition of becoming a film director. After living in Marina del Rey, Los Angeles, Nelson found work aboard the Golden Hinde, where he met his future wife Lisa Page. In 1992, Nelson completed his first novel, By Force of Arms. He and Lisa were married the next year. Nelson currently lives in Harpswell, Maine, with Lisa and their four children, Elizabeth, Nathaniel, Jonathan, and Abigail. Nelson continues to write full-time, and has published over twenty-five books, both fiction and nonfiction.

== Awards ==
Nelson received the W.Y. Boyd Literary Award for Excellence in Military Fiction from the American Library Association in 2004 for his novel, Glory In The Name: A Novel of the Confederate Navy.

He won the 2009 Samuel Eliot Morison Award for Naval Literature for George Washington's Secret Navy.

== Bibliography ==
=== Novels ===
- Revolution at Sea Saga series
1. By Force of Arms (1997), ISBN 978-0-671-51924-7
2. The Maddest Idea (1997), ISBN 978-0-671-51925-4
3. The Continental Risque (1998), ISBN 978-0-671-01381-3
4. Lords of the Ocean (1999), ISBN 978-0-671-03490-0
5. All the Brave Fellows (2001), ISBN 978-0-671-03846-5
6. The Falmouth Frigate (2022) ISBN 978-1-4930-6856-2
- Brethren of the Coast
1. The Guardship (2000), ISBN 0-380-80452-2. Spanish edition published by Ediciones B as "El vigía" in 2004.
2. The Blackbirder (2001), ISBN 0-06-000779-6. Spanish edition published by Ediciones B as "El negrero" in 2005.
3. The Pirate Round (2002), ISBN 0-06-053926-7. Spanish edition published by Ediciones B as "La ronda del pirata" in 2007.
- Civil War at Sea series
1. Glory in the Name (2004), ISBN 0-06-095905-3
2. Thieves of Mercy (2005), ISBN 0-06-019970-9
- The Norsemen Saga
1. Fin Gall (2013) ISBN 1-481-02869-3
2. Dubh-Linn (2014) ISBN 1484878930
3. The Lord of Vik-lo (2015) ISBN 1508699445
4. Glendalough Fair (2015) ISBN 9780692585450
5. Night Wolf (2016) ISBN 1534879684
6. Raider's Wake (2017) ISBN 9780692880265
7. Loch Garman (2017) ISBN 9780692976708
8. A Vengeful Wind (2018) ISBN 978-0692169216
9. Kings and Pawns (2019) ISBN 978-0578515106
10. The Midgard Serpent (2020) ISBN 978-0578696423
11. The Narrow Seas (2023) ISBN 979-8-218-22276-5
12. Land of the Wolf (2025) ISBN 979-8-9997291-0-1
- Blood, Steel, and Empire
1. The Buccaneer Coast (2021) ISBN 978-0-578-98110-9
2. The Tortuga Plantation (2024) ISBN 979-8-218-53232-1
- Standalone novels
  - The Only Life that Mattered: The Short and Merry Lives of Anne Bonny, Mary Read, and Calico Jack (2004) ISBN 159013060X
  - The French Prize (2015) ISBN 9781250046611
  - Full Fathom Five (2016) ISBN 9780692794883

=== Non-fiction ===
- Reign of Iron: The Story of the First Battling Ironclads, the Monitor and the Merrimack (2004) OCLC 60410100
- Benedict Arnold's Navy: the Ragtag Fleet that Lost the Battle of Lake Champlain But Won the American Revolution (2006), ISBN 0-07-146806-4 OCLC 64510314
- George Washington's Secret Navy: How the American Revolution Went to Sea (2008), ISBN 0-07-149389-1 OCLC 212627064
- George Washington's Great Gamble: And the Sea Battle That Won the American Revolution (2010), ISBN 0-07-162679-4
- With Fire and Sword: The Battle of Bunker Hill and the Beginning of the Revolution (2011) ISBN 978-0-312-57644-8
