= Ezra Cohen (ambassador) =

Panamanian diplomat and businessman

His Excellency Ezra Cohen

Panama Ambassador to Israel
- Incumbent
- Assumed office January, 2025
- Preceded by: Adis Arlene Urieta Vega

Personal details
- Spouse: Linda Cohen
- Occupation: Diplomat, businessman

Ezra Cohen is a Panamanian businessman serving as Ambassador of Panama to Israel since January 2025.

== Early life ==
Cohen was born in Panama in 1960. His family traces their roots to Persia and Jerusalem on his father’s side and Greece and Macedonia on his mother’s side. Cohen’s father, Moshe, moved from Colombia to British Mandatory Palestine as a young boy and later fought in the 1948 Arab–Israeli War, which ultimately resulted in the Israeli Declaration of Independence. During the war, he was captured by the Jordanians and held prisoner for nine months. After the war Moshe moved to Panama, where some of his family lived. A few years later, while visiting Jerusalem, Moshe met an Israeli woman (who would become Cohen's mother) and the two settled back in Panama.

== Career ==
Cohen started his career at age 17, working in both the public and private sectors fostering economic, technological, and cultural initiatives on a global scale. He founded 26 companies including the first Panamanian company to be listed on the NASDAQ.

As the executive director of Shevet Achim, a Jewish community organization in Panama, for nine years, Cohen looked to transform and modernize it. In this position, he helped facilitate the opening of 48 kosher restaurants in Panama. Cohen also helped create Kosherfest, a showcase of kosher food.

In January 2025, Cohen replaced Adis Arlene Urieta Vega as Panama's ambassador to Israel. In May 2026, Cohen accompanied Israeli president Isaac Herzog on his official visit to Panama.

== Personal life ==
Cohen is married to Linda Cohen. He speaks fluent Hebrew.
