= Ezra Tawil =

American literary scholar (1967–2024)

Ezra Tawil (1967 – January 23, 2024) was a scholar of American literature, and professor of English at the University of Rochester from 2011 until his death in 2024. His work on early American literature, the legacy of slavery in the United States, and the distinctive style of American literature is widely influential. He served for many years as the Director of Graduate Studies in the English Department. After undergraduate study at Wesleyan University, he completed his doctorate at Brown University in 2000. From 2008 to 2009 he was a Fellow at the Dorothy and Lewis B. Cullman Center for Scholars and Writers of the New York Public Library, where he also led seminars for Middle and High School Teachers.

== Works ==
- Literature, American Style: The Originality of Imitation in the Early Republic (2018)
- (editor) The Cambridge Companion to Slavery in American Literature (2016)
- The Making of Racial Sentiment: Slavery and the Birth of The Frontier Romance (2006)
