= Memory of a Broken Dimension =

- Developer: Ezra Hanson-White (XRA)
- Platforms: Windows, macOS, Linux
- Genre: Adventure
- Mode: Single-player

Memory of a Broken Dimension is an in-development adventure video game developed by XRA.

== Gameplay ==
Screenshot

Memory of a Broken Dimension begins with a command prompt interface called RELICS through which the player must navigate to reach the game world. Hanson-White has framed the game as a kind of found-footage experience, describing the areas explored as maps from a cyberpunk analogue of the Mars Curiosity Rover. Once inside the first-person perspective 3D game, the player will find themselves in black and white, distorted and static-filled areas. The player must move around shattered objects until their perspective shows them as a single object, at which point they can lock them in place as that object.

== Development ==
Ezra Hanson-White began development on the game in 2011, spending the first couple of years experimenting and learning and primarily working on the game at night. In 2014 he quit his job and began work on the game full-time. The game originally started with the player as a person in their apartment who would sit down at their computer to start the game, but this was removed in favour of the player themselves feeling like they're discovering something.

Hanson-White considers the mystery and difficulty of playing old, particularly MS-DOS, games as inspiration for Memory of a Broken Dimension and the artistic style is partly inspired by video artifacts when streaming videos on a poor internet connection as well as space exploration and archaeology. Hanson-White has also cited noise music, sumi-e, and black-and-white horror movies as influences on the game's visual language. He says that while working as a level designer on games made at large companies he grew frustrated at the simple linear areas he was creating, and wanted to experiment with game worlds with no objectives or guidance. Hanson-White periodically streamed some of the game's early development online. A playable demo of the game was made available on itch.io, and the project was formerly listed on Steam Greenlight prior to the service's closure in 2017.

== Reception ==
In 2015 Memory of a Broken Dimension was a finalist at the Independent Games Festival in the Excellence in Visual Art category. The game was also exhibited at the Seattle Indie Expo, where it drew attention from attendees for its visual style.
