= House style =

House style may refer to:

- Standards for writing as specified in the internal style guide of a particular institution, for example, a book publishing company, newspaper, professional organization, or university
- Standards for illustration or graphic design, as an aspect of corporate or organizational identity, or as used for the overall output of a comic book publisher or animation studio
- Types of residential structures (see List of house styles)

== See also ==
- House organ
