= A Way of Life (2016 film) =

- Directed by: Viraj Nayar
- Written by: Christopher Romano
- Produced by: Christopher Romano; Lilia Staverosky-Andrules; Geraldine Romano
- Starring: Christopher Romano; Finn Cutler; James Romano; Patsy Meck; Palik Zozulia; Brian Anthony Wilson; Sarah Van Auken; Danny Shea; Penelope Bellerjeau
- Cinematography: Zachary Van Heel
- Edited by: Justin Santoro
- Music by: Keith Giosa
- Release date: March 16, 2016
- Running time: 25 minutes
- Country: United States
- Language: English

A Way of Life is a 2016 short crime drama film directed by Viraj Nayar and produced by Christopher Romano. The film stars Christopher Romano as a recently released ex convict struggling to find work before the week is up in order to pay his overbearing grandmother (Patsy Meck) rent money before she kicks him out of the house.

== Film Festivals ==
- Arizona International Film Festival
- Diamond in the Rough Cut Film Festival
