= Ezra Jenkinson =

English composer and violinist

Ezra Jenkinson (1872–1947) was an English composer and violinist. His best known work, the Elves' Dance, makes extensive use of spiccato and is a show piece for intermediate beginners of the violin.

== Life ==
Jenkinson was born in Todmorden. According to the English author and artist William Holt, Jenkinson was given a grant by a local patron to study music in Leipzig, Germany, in his youth. After seven years, he returned to his home town to live alone and avoided the public after selling the rights to his compositions he was amassing. He died in his home town of Todmorden.

== Selected compositions ==
Chamber music

Elfentanz from Sechs lyrische Stücke. Bernard Chevalier, violin, Marsha Chevalier, piano (2015).

- Sechs lyrische Stücke (1.–3. Lage) (6 Lyric Pieces in First to Third Position) for violin and piano (1894)
  1. An der Wiege (Lullaby; Berceuse)
  2. Elfentanz (Elves' Dance; Danse des Sylphes)
  3. Melodie
  4. Mazurka
  5. Barcarolle
  6. Scherzo
- Kleine Suite (Little Suite; Petite Suite) for violin and piano (1900)
  1. La Fontaine
  2. Air
  3. Berceuse
  4. Gavotte et Musette
  5. Humoreske
  6. Serenade

Piano

- Frühlingslied (Spring Song) (1892)
