= Ezra Royals =

English footballer

Ezra John Royals (January 1882 – 4 April 1939) was an English footballer. His regular position was as a goalkeeper. He was born in Fenton, Staffordshire. He played for Chesterton White Star, Northwich Victoria, and Manchester United.
