= Ezra Uzi Yemin =

Israeli-American entrepreneur (born 1968)

Uzi Yemin
- עוזי ימין
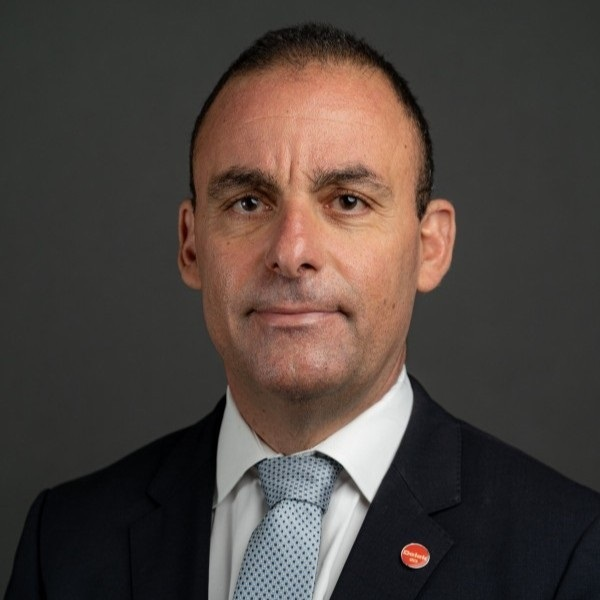
- Uzi Yemin
- Born: 18 September 1968 (age 57); Jerusalem, Israel
- Education: Hebrew University of Jerusalem
- Title: Executive Chairman, of Delek US
- Board member of: Adventure Science Center Nashville Area Chamber of Commerce The Food Institute
- Children: 3

Uzi Yemin (Hebrew: עוזי ימין; born September 18, 1968) is an Israeli-American entrepreneur, industrialist and philanthropist best known as the founder and Executive Chairman of Delek US.

== Early life ==
Yemin was born in Jerusalem to a Jewish family that immigrated to the nascent State of Israel from Iraq in 1951. Yemin's mother was born in Baghdad and his father in Mosul, Iraq.

Yemin was drafted into the Israel Defense Forces in February 1987 for compulsory military service, which he finished in February 1990 .

== Education ==
Yemin enrolled in the Hebrew University of Jerusalem where he remained as a student from October 1991 until 1997.

== Career ==
In 1995, while still in the process of completing his university studies, Yemin began working for the Israeli Ministry of Finance where he served as the head of the Administration of Non-Life Insurance Policy. Yemin remained with the Ministry until 1997.

Upon the completion of his studies, Yemin went to work for Clal Insurance Co. Ltd. In 1998, he became the head of General Insurance and was subsequently promoted to vice president. He remained with the company until 2000.

=== CEO of Delek US ===
In 2001, Yemin joined Delek Israeli Fuel Corporation as the CFO and the same year was chosen to expand the company's North American operations which led to the establishment of Delek US. Within the same year, Delek US completed the acquisition of MAPCO Express, Inc., from Williams Express, Inc. for $162.5 million.

In 2003, Delek US acquired seven retail fuel and convenience stores from Pilot Travel Centers for $11.9 million. In the same year, the company acquired 100 convenience stores (89 corporate run, 11 independently run) and an extensive wholesale fuel distribution business in the acquisition of Williamson Oil Co., for $19.8 million.

In 2005, Delek US acquired 25 gas stations and convenience stores in Nashville, Tennessee, from British energy oil and gas company BP for $33.5 million.

In 2006, Delek US acquired 43 retail fuel and convenience stores located in Georgia and Tennessee from Fast Petroleum, Inc. and affiliates for $50.0 million.

In 2007, Delek US completed the acquisition of 90 retail fuel and convenience stores from Calfee Co. of Dalton Inc. and affiliated companies, for approximately $57 million.

In 2011, Delek US acquired one hundred percent ownership of Lion Oil, which was previously a subsidiary of the Jackson, Mississippi-based Ergon Inc. In the same year, the company acquired ownership interest in the Red River Pipeline Company, LLC for $128.0 million.

In 2012, Delek US acquired the Nettleton Pipeline from Plains Marketing, LP for $12.3 million. In the same year, the company bought the Big Sandy Terminal from Sunoco Pipeline LP. and Sunoco Partners Marketing & Terminals, LP for $11.0 million.

In 2013, Delek US acquired the North Little Rock terminal from Enterprise Refined Products Pipeline Company, LLC for $7.2 million. In the same year, the company acquired the Helena Assets, a 149-mile, 10-inch pipeline that connects El Dorado, Arkansas to Helena, Arkansas, from EQM Technologies & Energy, Inc., for approximately $5.3 million.

In 2014, Delek US's former parent company— Delek Group —sold its entire stake in Delek US, with Delek US operating as an independent corporate entity from that point. In the same year, the company completed its acquisition of the Crossett Facility, a biodiesel plant in Crosset, Arkansas, from Pinnacle Biofuels, Inc. for $11.1 million.

In 2015, Delek US acquired 33.7 million shares of common stock of Alon USA Energy, Inc. from Alon Israel Oil Company, Ltd. for $572 million.

In 2016, Delek US sold MAPCO to the Santiago, Chile-based company, COPEC S.A, for $535 million.

In 2017, Delek US bought out Alon USA. As part of the Alon USA acquisition, Delek US became the owner of two more crude oil refineries located in the Gulf Coast area.

== Personal life ==
Yemin has three children.

Yemin is fluent in Hebrew and English, and has good knowledge of Arabic, and Spanish languages.

== Awards and honors ==
Yemin was invited to ring the NY stock exchange opening & closing bell on three separate occasions.
