= Romestecq =

- An early Dutch plain-trick game
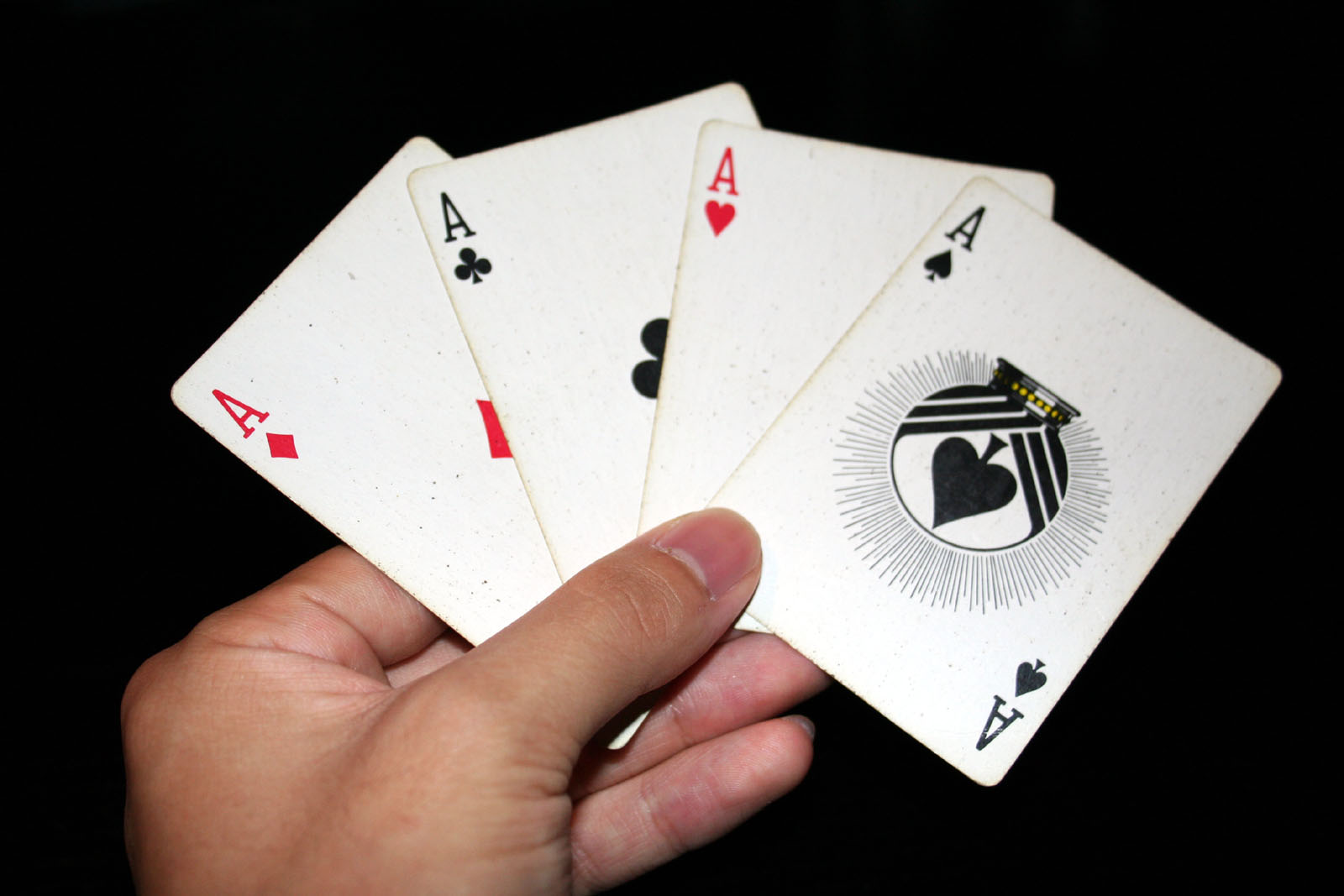
- A virlique wins the game immediately it is dealt
- Origin: Netherlands
- Alternative names: Rumstich, Roemstek, Rum und Stich
- Type: Simple trick-taker
- Players: 2, 4 or 6 in 2 teams
- Cards: 36
- Deck: Paris pattern, French-suited
- Play: Anticlockwise

Romestecq is an historical Dutch card game for two, four or six players in two teams that dates to at least the 17th century. It was also popular in France for over a century. Despite being criticised in contemporary sources as "complicated" it continued to appear in the literature until the end of the 19th century and was sufficiently interesting for it to appear in The Penguin Book of Card Games in 2008.

== History ==
Romestecq is first recorded in a German source in the late 16th century as Rum und Stich, but French sources repeatedly point to a Dutch origin. The earliest French rules (1659) note that "it is played in Rouen in the same way as it is played in Holland: but in Paris it is played according to more rigorous rules". Parlett records that it was played in the Low Countries as Roemstek and erroneously called Rumstick in an English source. It is frequently recorded in French games compendia until the end of the 19th century, for example, in Moulidars (1888).

== Rules ==
Parlett notes that contemporary descriptions are "barely intelligible". The following description is based on De Planche (1859), supplemented by Parlett (2008).

=== Preliminaries ===
The game is always played by two teams of either one, two or three players per side. A 36-card French-suited pack is used, the cards ranking "as in Piquet", from Ace (high) to Six (low). (Note: Albeit Piquet lacks the Sixes.) If six play, players sit in threes, the player in the middle being flanked by two opponents. The two middle players cut the pack; the one with the higher card deals, the other scores. The dealer deals five cards each in any combination desired: one-by-one or in packets of two, three or five. Whatever the mode of dealing used in the first hand must be adopted for the rest of the partie.

=== Scoring ===
The score is kept with jetons or paper and pencil. In Holland, they chalked the scores on the table. If six play, game is 36; otherwise it is 21. However, this may be varied by agreement. The score is marked up first and points erased as they are won.

=== Melds ===
Before play, players note any scoring combinations they hold. These are:

- Virlique. A set of four cards e.g. four Aces. Wins the game immediately. If two players have one, the higher ranking set wins.
- Triche. A set of three cards. Three Kings or Aces score 3 points; otherwise 2.
- Double Ningre. Any of the following: two Aces and two Kings; two Aces and two Tens; two Kings and two Tens. 3 points.
- Village. Two Queen/Jack pairs, each of the same suit. 2 points.
- Rome. Any pair ranking lower than a King e.g. two Queens. 1 point.
- Double Rome. An Ace or King pair. 2 points.

These melds are announced on playing the first card of the meld to a trick e.g. with the words "part of triche". Teams score for melds captured from the opposition.

=== Play ===
There are no trumps. Players must follow suit if able; otherwise may play any card. The highest card of the led suit wins the trick. The trick winner leads to the next. The last trick scores 1 point for Stecq.

== Bibliography ==
- De la Marinière, E. (1659). La Maison Académique. 2nd edn. Paris: Estienne Loison.
- De Planches, Orné (1859). Le Salon des Jeux. Paris: Langlumé.
- Moulidars, Th. de (1888). Grande Encyclopédie Méthodique, Universelle, Illustrée des Jeux et des Divertissements de L'Esprit et du Corps. Paris.
- Parlett, David (1991), A History of Card Games, Oxford: Oxford University Press, ISBN 0-19-282905-X
- Parlett, David (2008), The Penguin Book of Card Games, London: Penguin, ISBN 978-0-141-03787-5
