= Don Gent =

Australian rules footballer

Personal information
- Full name: Don Gent
- Born: 27 January 1933
- Died: 2 November 1996 (aged 63)
- Original team: Hawthorn City
- Height: 188 cm (6 ft 2 in)
- Weight: 79 kg (174 lb)
- Position: Fullback

Playing career^{1}
Years	Club	Games (Goals)
1955–59	Hawthorn	70 (0)
- ^{1} Playing statistics correct to the end of 1959.

Don Gent (27 January 1933 – 2 November 1996) was a former Australian rules footballer who played with Hawthorn in the Victorian Football League (VFL).
