= Thomas Style =

Thomas Style may refer to:

- Sir Thomas Style, 2nd Baronet (1624–1702), Member of Parliament (MP) for Kent
- Sir Thomas Style, 4th Baronet (died 1769), MP for Bramber
- Sir Thomas Style, 7th Baronet (died 1813), see Style Baronets
- Sir Thomas Style, 8th Baronet (1797–1879), British MP for Scarborough

== See also ==
- Thomas Stiles or Styles (fl. 1642–1662), a captain in the Royalist army during the English Civil War
