= Ezra Spicehandler =

Ezra Spicehandler (April 6, 1921 – March 25, 2014) was an American rabbi, writer, editor and educator specializing in modern Hebrew literature.

== Biography ==
He was born in Brooklyn, New York, the son of Abraham Spacehandler, an editor of the Hebrew periodical Hadoar. In 1946 he was ordained and awarded a Master of Hebrew Letters. He earned a PhD in 1952. He spent a year studying at the Hebrew University of Jerusalem, then received the National Defense Education Fellowship in Oriental Languages, 1960–1961. In 1961 he was the recipient of a Fulbright grant for research in Iran.

He was a rabbi at Temple Emanu-El in Westfield, New Jersey. He became associate professor and then professor of Hebrew Literature at the Hebrew Union College-Jewish Institute of Religion in Cincinnati. From 1966–1980 he was director then dean of the Jerusalem branch of the Hebrew Union College and later professor emeritus. He was a visiting professor of modern Hebrew literature at the Hebrew University of Jerusalem, 1969–1971, then a visiting fellow at the Oxford Centre for Post-Graduate Studies, 1973–1975 and visiting professor at the Oriental Institute of Oxford University in England, 1983–1984. In 1982, he became president of the Labor Zionist Alliance of America. In 1989 he was visiting professor at São Paulo Judaice Department in Brazil, August 1989. From 1990–1991, he was Skirball fellow at the Oxford Centre for Post-Graduate Studies.

He was the author and editor of numerous books and essays. He was awarded the Friedman Prize in 1990 for his work in modern Hebrew letters. In 1992 he received an honorary doctorate from the Hebrew Union College.

Ezra was married to Shirley (Horn) Spicehandler and had two daughters, Reena and Judith, who are both also rabbis. Spicehandler died in Cincinnati on March 25, 2014.
