= Alan Clouter =

Alan Clouter GM
- Born: 18 September 1941
- Died: 20 February 2015 (aged 73)
- Military career
- Allegiance: British
- Branch: Army
- Rank: Major
- Awards: George Medal

Major Alan Ian Clouter GM (18 September 1941 – 20 February 2015) was a British Army bomb disposal expert who was awarded the George Medal in 1972 for his work in Northern Ireland.

In autumn of 1971, Clouter, then Captain, was serving with the 321 Explosive Ordnance Disposal (EOD) Squadron based in Lisburn.

Clouter was awarded the George Medal after his squadron was called to deal with bombs in Northern Ireland including one that had been placed in the Europa Hotel in Belfast. The explosive device was found in a public telephone booth in the bar of the hotel.
