= Paul Coche =

French modern pentathlete 1904–1996

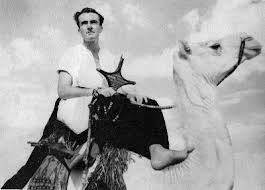

Personal information
- Full name: Paul Raymond Coche
- Born: 26 January 1904 Valence, France
- Died: 24 November 1996 (aged 92) Grenoble, France

Sport
- Sport: Modern pentathlon

Paul Raymond Coche (26 January 1904 – 24 November 1996) was a French modern pentathlete. He competed at the 1928 Summer Olympics.
