= Ezra Light Grumbine =

American medical doctor, local historian

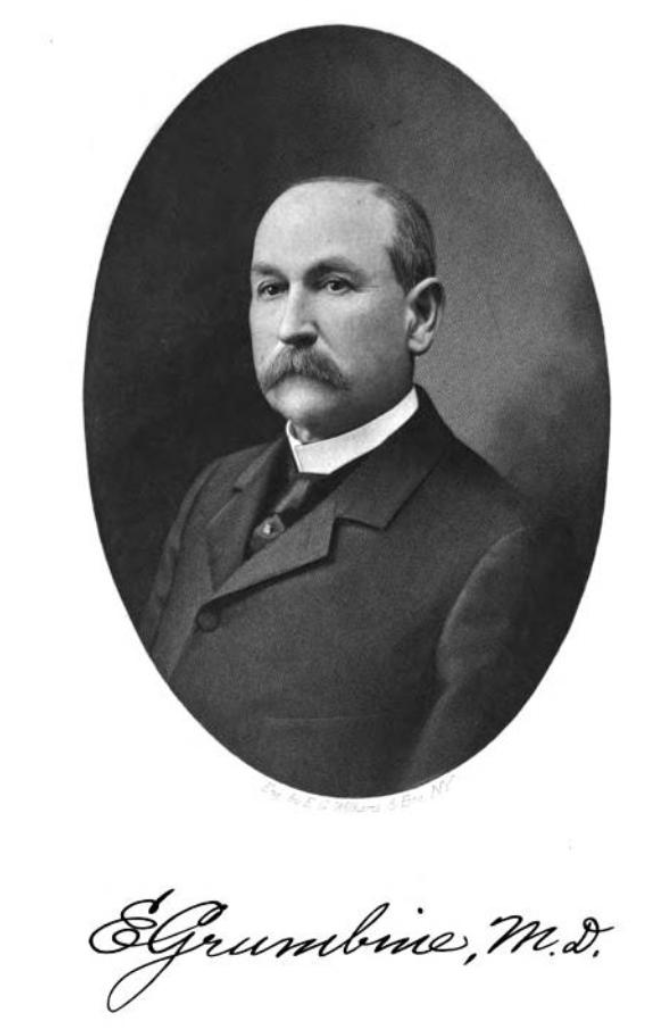
Ezra L. Grumbine

Ezra Light Grumbine (February 1, 1845 - February 16, 1923) was an American medical doctor, local historian, and published columnist and poet in the Pennsylvania German language. His dialect pseudonym was "Wendell Kitzmiller," which he used to write weekly columns in the Lebanon News beginning on November 17, 1900.

Grumbine was born in Fredericksburg, Pennsylvania and died in Lebanon, Pennsylvania. He received his medical degree from the University of Pennsylvania and served as U.S. postmaster at Mt. Zion from 1877 to 1890.

== Bibliography ==
- Der Prahl-Hans: An Epic of 1812 (read to the Pennsylvania German Society in 1895)
- Two Dead and Lost Churches of the Swatara (1900)
- An Early Educational Project of Lebanon Town: Paper Read before the Lebanon County Historical Society (1905)
- Folk-lore and Superstitious Beliefs of Lebanon County: Paper Read before the Lebanon County Historical Society, October 20, 1905 (1905)
- Stories of Old Stumpstown: A History of Interesting Events, Traditions and Anecdotes of Early Fredericksburg, Known for Many Years As Stumpstown: Read before the Lebanon County Historical Society in Three Installments on Oct. 15, 1909, on June 17 and on Aug. 19, 1910
- The Founding of Fredericksburg: Paper Read before the Lebanon County Historical Society, August 15, 1913
- Frederick Stump, the Founder of Fredericksburg, Pa.: A Paper Read before the Lebanon County Historical Society, June 26, 1914
- The History of Greenville. The Great Fire at Fredericksburg (an historical poem). An Old-time Religious Service in Bethel Township. Read before the Lebanon County Historical Society, April 27, 1917
- Der Prahl-hans: The Ghost, and Other Rhymes, in the Pennsylvania German, the Teuton, and the American English (1917)
- Die Inshurance Business: A Serio-comic Drama in the Pennsylvania German Vernacular, "as she is spoke" in the German Districts of Pennsylvania
- An Old Tragedy of Jackson Township (1925)

== See also ==
- Lee Light Grumbine, brother, also a Pennsylvania German author
