= Ezra Sigwela =

South African politician and activist (born 1940)

Member of the National Assembly
- In office June 1999 – April 2004
- Constituency: Eastern Cape

Personal details
- Born: Ezra Mvuyisi Sigwela; 26 October 1940 (age 85)
- Citizenship: South Africa
- Party: African National Congress

Ezra Mvuyisi Sigwela (born 26 October 1940) is a retired South African politician and former anti-apartheid activist. He was recruited into the African National Congress (ANC) in the 1950s and was active in the organisation's underground structures in the Transkei after it was banned in 1960. He was imprisoned on Robben Island for his political activities. Upon his release, Sigwela, a devout Christian, became a fieldworker for the Transkei Council of Churches.

After the 1994 general election, Sigwela served in the Executive Council of the Eastern Cape from 1994 to 1997, first as the Eastern Cape's inaugural Member of the Executive Council (MEC) for Planning and Development and then as MEC for Public Administration. Premier Arnold Stofile fired him from the executive council in a reshuffle in May 1997. In the 1999 general election, Sigwela was elected to represent the ANC in the National Assembly, where he served a single term. After leaving Parliament, he was South African Ambassador to Rwanda until 2008.
