= Ezra Warner =

Ezra Warner may refer to:

- Ezra Warner (inventor), American inventor of the first can opener in 1858
- Ezra J. Warner (historian) (1910 – 1974), American Civil War historian
