= George Stiles =

George Stiles may refer to:

- George Stiles (composer) (born 1961), British composer
- George Stiles (politician), mayor of Baltimore from 1816 to 1819
- George P. Stiles (1814–1885), Justice of the Supreme Court of the Utah Territory from 1854 to 1857

== See also ==
- George Styles (disambiguation)
