= Tara Stiles =

American yoga teacher

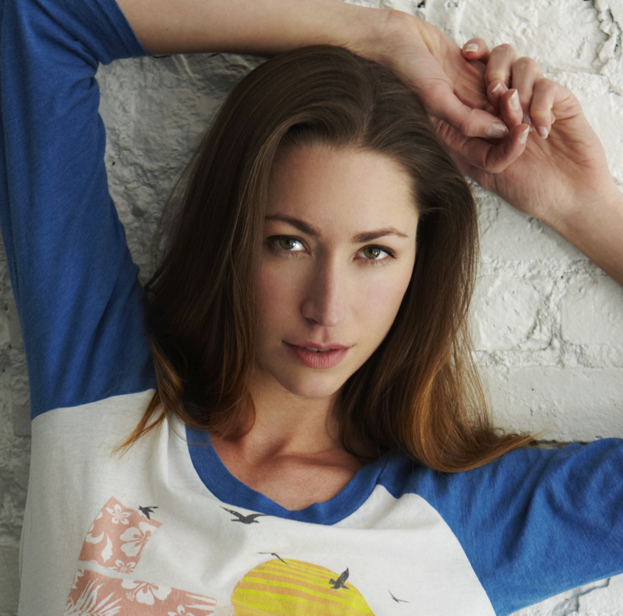
- Born: Tara Leann Stiles; Morris, Illinois, U.S.
- Occupation: Strala CEO
- Modeling information
- Height: 5 ft 9 in (1.75 m)
- Website: www.tarastiles.com

Tara Leann Stiles is an American model turned yoga instructor, and founder of Strala yoga in New York City. Stiles grew Strala from a studio based in SoHo, New York City to a studio and training business with over 1,000 instructors. Harvard did a case study on Stiles' business titled The Branding of Yoga.

In 2007, Tara starred in Yoga For, produced by Ford Models. Vanity Fair reported on a yoga video that Stiles specifically designed for Sarah Palin; the "Vanity Fair" reporter commented, "Tara Stiles has got to be the coolest yoga instructor ever."

== Early life ==
Stiles grew up in Morris, Illinois. Her parents designed their passive solar home, helped by the fact her father worked at a nuclear plant.

== Career ==
Stiles studied dancing in Chicago, where one of her ballet instructors introduced her to yoga. Stiles appeared in ads for American Apparel. Stiles has been a spokesperson for Nissan Motors.

== Strala Yoga ==
In 2008, Stiles met her husband Michael Taylor at the Ananda Ashram in Monroe, New York. The couple founded the NYC yoga studio Strala later that year. They made up the name, which is similar to the Swedish word "stråla" which means to "radiate light". Deepak Chopra and Jane Fonda are among her students; the former considers her his personal instructor. "I have been doing yoga for 30 years," he says. "I have had teachers of all kinds. Taking lessons from her has been more useful to me than taking yoga from anyone else."

Stiles does not follow any school of yoga and focuses purely on its physical aspects and health benefits, with no philosophical or spiritual dimension. She eschews the Sanskrit names for yoga positions and does not ask students to chant. She hires instructors without regard to the certification process normally required elsewhere, preferring to assess them by watching them teach, although Strala does offer a teacher-training program. Strala's per-class fee, $10, is lower than other Manhattan yoga studios.

Her goal is to make yoga more accessible. "People need yoga, not another religious leader. Quite often in New York, they want to be religious leaders, and it's not useful," she explains. "I was never invited to the party anyway—so I started my own party." Too many people outside yoga, she believes, see it as "something Jennifer Aniston does." Fonda has praised "her ability to make yoga accessible to people who might be scared of it or think it might be too esoteric." Stiles says she receives letters regularly from people, such as military men, who do her videos but are afraid to go to a yoga studio. "This studio is the first place I have felt comfortable," one Strala student told The New York Times. "It doesn't feel like it's all 26-year-old former dancers."

Stiles' approach to yoga has met with some controversy in the yoga community. Jennilyn Carson of the popular YogaDork blog reports that some practitioners consider it "disrespect to what the practice is" for Stiles to promote it as a weight-loss method. "I don't care what Tara Stiles says yoga is," another yogini says. "It's not about making your body beautiful." Others have complained about her willingness to draw on her modeling background and exploit sex appeal in yoga-wear advertisements and her videos, some of which she has appeared in wearing short shorts and a tank top. "Who made these rules?", Stiles has responded. "I feel like I'm standing up for yoga." To critics of her videos and photo shoots, she says, "We should not be hiding behind our bodies. [They] should be empowering." To critics of her method of yoga instruction she said, "When they come to class, they see that we're guiding every single moment of movement. It's not chaos."

== Collaborations ==
Stiles partnered with Reebok to design and launch Reebok Yoga in 2012.

Stiles is an avid knitter and collaborated with Wool and the Gang on a yoga-street wear line, featuring ready-to-wear, as well as knit kits, designed by Wool and the Gang and Tara Stiles, featuring the "Tara Stiles" label on the garments.

== Books ==
- 2014 Make Your Own Rules Diet (Hay House).
- 2015 Make Your Own Rules Cookbook (Hay House).

== Television ==
Stiles was a contestant and winner of MTV's Fear episode 9, "Fort Gains." She also has appeared in Matthew Barney's The Cremaster Cycle: Cremester 3. She co-hosted three segments on fitness and fashion with Pedro Andrade, Siafa Lewis, and Margherita Missoni.
