= George Biddlecombe =

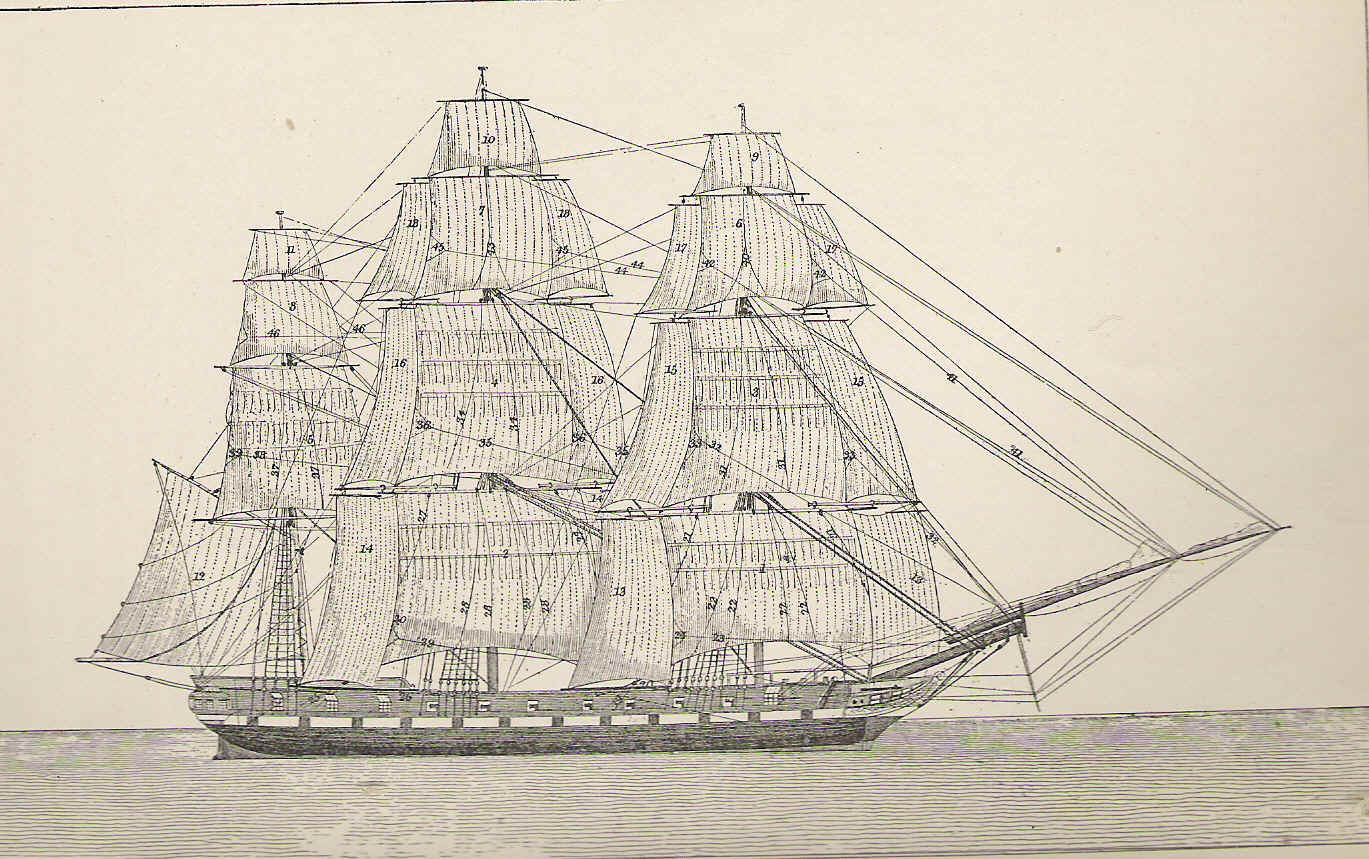
Diagram from A Treatise on the Art of Rigging

Sir George Biddlecombe (5 November 1807 – 22 July 1878) was an English naval officer, hydrographer and author.

== Life ==
Biddlecombe, born at Portsea, Portsmouth, was the son of Thomas Biddlecombe of Sheerness Dockyard, who died on 12 September 1844. He was educated at a school kept by Dr. Neave at Portsea, and joined the ship Ocean of Whitby as a midshipman in 1823. After some years, he left the mercantile marine, and, passing as a second master in the royal navy in May 1828, was soon after employed in surveying in the Ætna and the Blonde until 1833. He was in active service on various ships until 1854, being specially noted for the great skill which he displayed in conducting naval surveys in many parts of the world.

While in the Actæon, in 1836, he surveyed a group of islands discovered by her in the Pacific. When attached to the Talbot, 1838–42, he surveyed numerous anchorages on the Ionian station, in the Archipelago, and up the Dardanelles and Bosphorus; examined the south shore of the Black Sea as far as Trabzon, as well as the port of Varna, and prepared a survey, published by the admiralty, of the bays and banks of Akko. He also displayed much skill and perseverance in surveying the Sherki shoals, where he discovered many unknown patches. A plan which he proposed for a 'hauling-up slip' was approved of by the authorities, and money was voted for its construction. For his survey of Port Royal and Kingston he received the thanks of the common council of Kingston, and on 20 August 1843, on the occurrence of a destructive fire in that town, the services rendered by Biddlecombe at imminent risk to himself obtained for him a letter of acknowledgement from the merchants and other inhabitants.

Few officers saw more active service at the time. As master of the Baltic fleet, 14 March 1854, he reconnoitred the southern parts of Åland, Hanko Peninsula, Barösund, and the anchorage of Sveaborg (present-day Suomenlinna), preparatory to taking the fleet to those places. He conducted the allied fleets to Kronstadt, and taking charge in Ledsund of the Prince steamer, with upwards of 2,000 French troops on board, he carried that ship to the Battle of Bomarsund, and was afterwards present at the fall of that fortress. He was employed as assistant master attendant at Keyham Yard, Devonport, 1855–64, and from the latter date to January 1868 as master attendant of Woolwich Dockyard.

He was made a C.B. 13 March 1867, but the highest rank he obtained in the navy was that of staff captain, 1 July 1867. He was knighted by the queen at Windsor Castle on 26 June 1873, and received a Greenwich Hospital pension soon afterwards. He died at Lewisham.

== Family ==
He married twice, first, in 1842 to Emma Louisa (d. 13 August 1865), third daughter of Thomas Kent, and secondly, in 1866, to Emma Sarah (d. 6 May 1878, age 49), daughter of William Middleton.

== Works ==
Sir George Biddlecombe published the following works:

1. A Treatise on the Art of Rigging 1848
2. Remarks on the English Channel 1850; sixth edition, 1863
3. Naval Tactics and Trials of Sailing 1850
4. Steam Fleet Tactics 1857
5. Autobiography Chapman and Hall, 1878; 1st edition

This list does not include the accounts of the surveys made by him in various parts of the world, and which were published by order of the admiralty.
