= N.E.B. Ezra =

Nissim Elias Benjamin Ezra
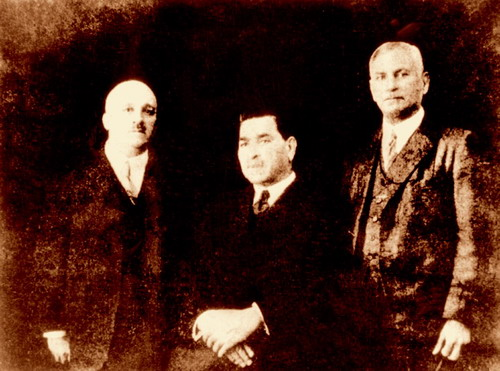
- N.E.B. Ezra (left) with two associates
- Born: 1883; Lahore, Punjab Province, British India (present-day Pakistan)
- Died: December 5, 1936 (aged 52–53); Shanghai
- Other names: N.E.B. Ezra
- Occupation: publisher
- Title: Israel's Messenger (editor-in-chief); Shanghai Zionist Association (founder, 1903)

Nissim Elias Benjamin Ezra (1883–1936), commonly known as N.E.B. Ezra, was a Baghdadi Jewish publisher and Zionist based in Shanghai. He founded the Shanghai Zionist Association in 1903 and its official newspaper, Israel's Messenger, one of China's oldest and most sophisticated Jewish periodicals. He served as editor-in-chief of the newspaper for more than 30 years until his death in 1936. Influenced by Ezra, his nephews started the newspaper Jewish Tribune in Bombay, India.

== Biography ==
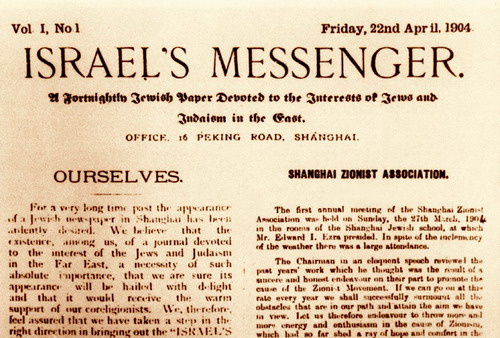
First issue of Israel's Messenger, 22 April 1904

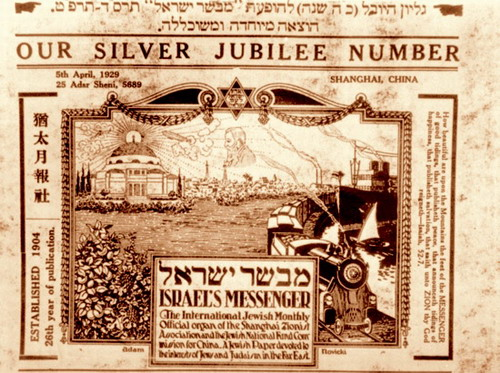
Silver jubilee issue of Israel's Messenger, 5 April 1929

Nissim Elias Benjamin Ezra was a Baghdadi Jew born in Lahore, British India (now Pakistan), and settled in Shanghai, China. An ardent Zionist, he established the Shanghai Zionist Association (SZA) in 1903 and its official newspaper, Israel's Messenger, in 1904. The newspaper was one of China's oldest Jewish periodicals, and became one of the most sophisticated under Ezra's leadership. He served as Editor-in-Chief of the newspaper for more than 30 years until his death in 1936. It was also circulated in the United States, where it successfully positioned itself as the most authoritative Jewish voice in East Asia.

Ezra also served as the main leader of the Shanghai Zionist Association, which had about 100 members in March 1905, for many years. A major financial supporter of the movement was the tycoon Elly Kadoorie, who became chairman of the SZA in 1915. Despite their efforts, Zionism did not become a major cause of the wealthy Baghdadi Jews of Shanghai, who were organized as the Shanghai Jewish Community Association. On the other hand, Ezra received support from Sun Yat-sen, leader of China's nationalist revolution. In a letter to Ezra dated 24 April 1920, Sun wrote that "all lovers of Democracy cannot help but support wholeheartedly and welcome with enthusiasm the movement to restore your wonderful and historic nation, which has contributed so much to the civilization of the world and which rightfully deserves an honorable place in the family of nations."

On 5 December 1936, Ezra died of heart disease in Shanghai.

== Views ==
N.E.B. Ezra held a pessimistic view of the West, at a time when Europe was dominated by the regimes in Germany and Russia, which were responsible for widespread human rights abuses. He saw the East a refuge of humanity, and pleaded for a new Buddha, who, like Moses, Confucius, Jesus, and Mohammed, would save the world from the threat of tyranny. That view made him controversial among the Sephardi Jewish community.

Ezra extolled the contributions made by the Jews to the development and modernization of China, and thought following the teachings of Confucius would save China and move the world: "Confucius pleaded for justice and righteousness; he made morality and good government synonymous. If the country is willing to follow him and adopt his teachings then China will be able to 'move the world' in the real sense of the word." The view was seen as overly idealistic for the time, when China was faced with grave threats from Japanese imperialism.

On 15 September 1933, Ezra wrote a letter to Mamoru Shigemitsu and proposed to resettle the European Jews persecuted by Nazi Germany in Manchukuo. He also wrote to Israel Cohen, secretary of the World Zionist Organization in London, for support. Cohen opposed his plan, noting that it would be inappropriate to settle the refugees in Japanese-occupied Manchukuo, and the potential instability that might result from the conflict between Japan and the Soviet Union in Manchuria.

== Legacy ==
Ezra's nephews, the Sargon brothers (Benjamin, Joseph, and David) of Bombay, grew up reading Israel's Messenger. Greatly influenced by Ezra's journalistic concepts, the brothers edited the Jewish Advocate (later renamed the Jewish Tribune) in the 1930s, bringing it to a much higher level of professionalism than the older Jewish newspapers of Bombay.

== Bibliography ==
- Bei Gao (2013). Shanghai Sanctuary: Chinese and Japanese Policy Toward European Jewish Refugees During World War II. Oxford University Press. ISBN 978-0-19-984090-8.
- Cesarani, David (2014). Port Jews: Jewish Communities in Cosmopolitan Maritime Trading Centres, 1550-1950. Routledge. ISBN 978-1-135-29246-1.
- Goldstein, Jonathan (1998). The Jews of China. M.E. Sharpe. ISBN 978-0-7656-3631-7.
- Messmer, Matthias (2012). Jewish Wayfarers in Modern China: Tragedy and Splendor. Lexington Books. ISBN 978-0-7391-6938-4.
- Ristaino, Marcia Reynders (2003). Port of Last Resort: The Diaspora Communities of Shanghai. Stanford University Press. ISBN 978-0-8047-5023-3.
