= Peter White (footballer) =

Australian rules footballer (1970–1996)

Personal information
- Full name: Peter White
- Born: 11 July 1970
- Died: 2 November 1996 (aged 26); Port Campbell
- Original team: Mt Pleasant
- Height: 178 cm (5 ft 10 in)
- Weight: 76 kg (168 lb)

Playing career^{1}
Years	Club	Games (Goals)
1989, 1991	Carlton	3 (1)
- ^{1} Playing statistics correct to the end of 1991.

Peter White (11 July 1970 – 2 November 1996) was an Australian rules footballer who played with Carlton in the Victorian/Australian Football League (VFL/AFL).

== Biography ==
Born 11 July 1970, White came from a sporting family, with his brother Dean a reserves player at Carlton and father Cliff a former Heathcote District Football League player, coach and administrator. White was just 16 when he won Mt Pleasant Football Club's senior "Best and Fairest" in 1986. Two years later he was playing under-19s football for Carlton and after winning their club champion award was promoted to their VFL list in 1989. He made his league debut at Waverley Park against Collingwood and had 12 disposals. The following week White had five touches and kicked his only goal, in a win over Fitzroy at Princes Park. He didn't play a senior game in 1990 and made just one appearance for Carlton in 1991, against Adelaide.

After leaving Carlton, White returned to the Heathcote District Football League and was playing coach in Mt Pleasant's 1993 and 1994 premiership teams.

White was a member of another premiership team in 1996, this time with Goulburn Valley Football League (GVFL) club Kyabram. Later in the year, White would go on a fishing trip from which he would never return, along with his father and a childhood friend, off the coast of Port Campbell. Although their bodies were never found, rescuers later recovered two life jackets, footwear, a fuel tank and a key ring belonging to Peter White.

Every year since the accident, HDFL clubs Mount Pleasant and Heathcote have played each other for the Cliff and Peter White Memorial Shield.
