= Ezra Seaman =

American lawyer and political theorist

Ezra Champion Seaman (1805–1880) was an American lawyer and political theorist.

Seaman was born in Chatham, Columbia County, New York on October 14, 1805. In 1831 he was admitted as an attorney of the Supreme Court. In 1835 Seaman married Marietta Virginia Doe (1808–1880) and they had three children Walter Doe (1837–1845), Augustus B. (1844–1845) and John Marshall (1847–1872). In 1839 they moved to Detroit, Michigan.

While practicing in Detroit in 1847 Seaman was possibly the first lawyer in the western states to have his briefs and arguments printed prior to submission to the court. The advantages of this practice were recognized in the city by the legal profession which followed suit.

In the years 1849 to 1853 Seaman lived in Washington, D.C. and served as the chief clerk of the first comptroller of the U.S. treasury, Elisha Whittlesey. In 1853 Seaman moved back to Detroit and then in 1854 to Ann Arbor, Michigan where he was appointed by Governor Kinsley S. Bingham as inspector of the state prison.

Seaman wrote several books on scientific and constitution subjects and was described in his Obituary as "... an original, independent, and profound thinker." His title Essays on the Progress of Nations, in Civilization, Productive Industry, Wealth and Population had 7 versions between 1852 and 1868.

== Protectionist thought ==
Ezra Seaman detailed what man was. He disagreed with the school of fatalism and the Calvinistic school who conveyed that the creator of the universe gave man no free will. That every thing that happened to the lord of creation, man was preordained. This dismal view of man meant that he had no independence/responsibility, no manifest destiny liberty power of human thought/no self-direction. Essentially, man being a puppet was not entertained by Seaman. He expounded on this quote from Genesis that man was meant to "be fruitful multiply subdue the earth and replenish it." This is a high view of man something that free traders will never have. He said in the 1846 edition of Essays On the Progress of Nations:

"Though the laws of nature are uniform in their operation, yet man by his inventive powers and his own efforts and industry during a series of years, can alter the face of nature, and convert the ores and mineral substances in the bowels of the earth, and other material things, and natures products, as well as natures's laws, into instruments, and mechanical powers, to augment the productiveness of his own industry, and the products of the earth. The more labor saving machinery he can invent and bring into use, the more easily he can subdue the earth; convert its resources and products to his use; increase the products of agricultural as well as mechanical industry, and facilitate their transportation and exchange."

Again his 1846 edition of Essays On the Progress of Nation he says:

"It is in accordance with the policy of the FREE TRADE PARTY (Democratic Party), to manufacture nothing for ourselves because they can manufacture in England and France cheaper than we can." In regards to the free trade tariff legislation of 1833, Seaman stated that it put the US in an unbridled competition with a plethora of foreign commodities that supplanted domestic goods causing for Americans to be idle. They were driven to engage in agriculture. Free trade had ruined the division and diversity of employments that protectionism gave the country.

Lastly, Seaman gave his thoughts on the dismal situation in the South by talking about Virginia in his 1846 edition of Essays on the Progress of Nations. Seaman thought that the State of Virginia could become a commercial center for the American South. This was due to its good climate, agricultural lands, soil, mines and minerals. The Chesapeake Bay and the rivers of Virginia had been hardly developed. Virginia was bigger than Holland and England, and had iron, coal, and outstanding water powers via her rivers. She had an advantage that many states in the union did not have, and she had more resources than England. She also had amazing potential to be a mining and manufacturing state and she could have excelled in commerce; however, Virginia's lack of protectionism and the practice of slavery prevented the state from fulfilling her potential.

== Bibliography ==
- Essays on the Progress of Nations, in Civilization, Productive Industry, Wealth and Population (1852)
- Commentaries on the Constitutions and Laws, Peoples, and History of the United States (1863)
- The American System of Government (1870)
- Views of nature, and of the elements, forces, and phenomena of nature, and of mind (1873)
