= Ezra Stiles (disambiguation) =

Ezra Stiles may refer to:

- Ezra Stiles (1727–1795), American educator, academic, Congregationalist minister, theologian, and author
- Ezra C. Stiles (1891–1974), American landscape architect
- Ezra Stiles College, residential college at Yale University

== See also ==
- Ezra Stiles Ely (1786–1861), American Presbyterian minister
- Ezra Stiles Gannett (1801–1871), American Unitarian minister
