= Harlan Hanson =

American educator (1925–1996)

- Born: February 18, 1925; Madison, Wisconsin, U.S.
- Died: November 28, 1996 (aged 71)
- Other name: "Harpo" Hanson
- Occupation: Educator
- Known for: Director of Advanced Placement program
- Spouse: Dorothea (Reynolds) Hanson (m. 1950-1996)

Harlan Philip Hanson (February 18, 1925 – November 28, 1996), also known as "Harpo" Hanson, was an American educator and the Director of the Advanced Placement Program from 1965 to 1989.

== Early life and education ==
Hanson was born in Madison, Wisconsin, on February 18, 1925. He Hanson attended Harvard University in the early 1940s, but his education at Harvard was interrupted in 1943 when he was drafted into service with the U.S. Army Air Forces during World War II. After the war's conclusion, Hanson returned to Harvard, where he graduated summa cum laude in 1948. That year, he received the John A. Walz, Jr. Prize for "Best Divisional Examination" in German.

Prior to his graduation, he lived in Alsace and studied in Europe on a scholarship. In 1959, Hanson received his Ph.D in 1959.

== Career ==
In 1950, Hanson became an assistant dean at Harvard University. While at Harvard, he was also a senior tutor at Kirkland House, where he resided with his wife, Dorothea Reynolds, a graduate of Radcliffe College.

In 1954, Harvard began offering students credit and advanced standing for work completed in high school, including Advanced Placement (AP) courses, and Hanson, then a graduate student was given the task of implementing the new program. With two colleagues, Hanson, started the Office of Advanced Standing at Harvard University, and as Director of Harvard's Office of Advanced Standing in 1955, Hanson worked to get all academic departments to standardize their award-granting requirements and to align their policies with the standards outlined by the College Entrance Examination Board (CEEB). Hanson was a member of the Committee of Examiners for the 1956–1957 AP German syllabus.

Hanson quit his position with Harvard's office of Advanced Standing in November 1957 to accept an assistant professorship at Williams College. By the time Hanson left Harvard, Advanced Standing existed in 174 colleges, and Harvard alone grew from 39 students admitted with advanced standing the first year, to 174 the year Hanson left. He remained through the mid 1960s at Williams College. During this period he translated History of the Weimar Republic and also translated and edited a German anthology. Hanson also served as Chief Reader for the AP German examinations while at Williams College.

One of my heroes ...was Harlan “Harpo” Hanson, a big man with a dry wit who was once both the director of AP for the College Board and a force behind the first big grant for IB in the United States. He had four children. He gave each teen the facts about the two programs and let them decide. Two chose IB. Two chose AP. In each case, Hanson said, they made the right decision.
—Jay Mathews, The Washington Post

In 1965, Hanson succeeded Jack Arbolino as Director of the Advanced Placement program for the College Board and he remained at this position until 1989. For 23 of these years, Hanson "administered the program single-handedly, with some secretarial help and advice from the Educational Testing Service," yet under his leadership the AP program nonetheless "grew exponentially." By the time he left the post of Director, the number of high schools offering AP courses had increased from 93 to over 8000, and the number of colleges that accepted AP courses had grown from fewer than 50 to nearly 2000. During this same period, the number of high school students participating in AP courses increased from 34,000 to about 315,000.

In the mid-1960s, Hanson was one of the original council members of the International Schools Examinations Syndicate, which later became the International Baccalaureate Organisation. He was instrumental in acquiring funding from the Ford Foundation for IB and securing university recognition from Ivy League schools such as Harvard and Princeton for the IB Diploma Programme. Hanson was also a founding member of the board of International Baccalaureate North America (IBNA).

He is buried in East Lawn Cemetery in Williamstown, Massachusetts.
