= Styles Strait =

Coordinates: 66°51′S 48°35′E

Styles Strait is a channel 15 miles (24 km) long and 6 to 9 miles (10 to 14 km) wide, separating White Island from Sakellari Peninsula. It was plotted from air photos taken by Australian National Antarctic Research Expeditions (ANARE) in November 1956, and visited in February 1960 and February 1961 by ANARE (Thala Dan), while led by D.F. Styles, for whom it was named.
