= Ezra Taylor =

Ezra Taylor may refer to:

- Ezra B. Taylor (1823–1912), U.S. Representative from Ohio
- Ezra Taylor (rugby union) (born 1983), New Zealand rugby union player
- Ezra Taylor (boxer) (born 1994), British boxer
