= Ezra Bartlett =

English cricketer

Personal information
- Full name: Ezra William Bartlett
- Born: 26 September 1861; Doncaster, Yorkshire, England
- Died: 16 March 1942 (aged 80); Taunton, Somerset, England
- Batting: Unknown
- Bowling: Unknown
- Role: Batsman, occasional wicketkeeper

Domestic team information
- Years: Team
- 1894–1895: Somerset
- First-class debut: 11 June 1894 Somerset v Kent
- Last First-class: 31 August 1895 Somerset v Gloucestershire

Career statistics
Competition	First-class
Matches	6
Runs scored	126
Batting average	11.45
100s/50s	–/–
Top score	40
Balls bowled	30
Wickets	–
Bowling average	–
5 wickets in innings	–
10 wickets in match	–
Best bowling	0/16
Catches/stumpings	2/–
- Source: CricketArchive, 27 February 2011

Ezra William Bartlett (26 September 1861 – 16 March 1942) played first-class cricket for Somerset in 1894 and 1895. He also played for Somerset in 1886 and 1889, when the county team was not considered first-class. He was born at Doncaster, Yorkshire and died at Taunton, Somerset.

Bartlett was a lower-order batsman, but it is not known whether he batted right- or left-handed. In a non-first-class match against Staffordshire in 1889 and in his first first-class match in 1894 against Kent he kept wicket. But in five other games in 1895 he played as a batsman, though he bowled six overs of unknown style in one match. His highest score was 40, made in the second innings of the home match against Hampshire in 1895, which Somerset lost narrowly.

His obituary in Wisden Cricketers' Almanack in 1943 records that he was employed by the Post Office and that he was a prominent player and administrator at Taunton Cricket Club.
