= Chester Blanchard =

American baseball player

- Third baseman
- Born: July 13, 1903; Adena, Ohio, U.S.
- Died: November 13, 1996 (aged 93); Dayton, Ohio, U.S.
- Batted: Unknown Threw: Right

Negro league baseball debut
- 1926, for the Dayton Marcos

Last appearance
- 1928, for the Cleveland Tigers

NNL statistics
- Batting average: .224
- Home runs: 0
- Runs batted in: 3
- Stats at Baseball Reference

Teams
- Dayton Marcos (1926); Cleveland Tigers (1928)

Chester Augustus Blanchard (July 13, 1903 – November 13, 1996) was an American professional baseball third baseman in the Negro leagues. He played with the Dayton Marcos in 1926 and the Cleveland Tigers in 1928.
