= George Styles (British Army officer) =

Stephen George Styles
- Born: 16 March 1928; Crawley, England
- Died: 1 August 2006 (aged 78)
- Burial place: Snell Hatch Cemetery, Crawley
- Military career
- Allegiance: United Kingdom
- Branch: British Army
- Service years: 1946–1974
- Rank: Lieutenant Colonel
- Service number: 383996
- Unit: Royal Army Ordnance Corps
- Conflicts: Malayan Emergency; Indonesia–Malaysia confrontation The Troubles
- Awards: George Cross; Mentioned in Despatches

Lieutenant Colonel Stephen George Styles, GC (16 March 1928 – 1 August 2006), usually known as George Styles, was a British Army officer and a bomb disposal expert in the Royal Army Ordnance Corps (RAOC). He received the George Cross for his service in defusing terrorist bombs in Northern Ireland in the 1970s.

== Early life ==
Styles was born in Crawley, where his father was a bricklayer. He was educated at Collyers Grammar School, Horsham (aka College of Richard Collyer). He was called for national service in 1946, and, after officer cadet training, received an emergency commission as a second lieutenant and was posted to the central ammunition depot at Kineton.

== Army career ==
On 31 December 1948, Styles received a short-service commission in the RAOC. He was granted a regular commission on 18 May 1949 and was retroactively promoted to lieutenant with effect from 16 March; he was subsequently seconded to the King's Own Yorkshire Light Infantry He served with the 1st Battalion as a temporary captain in the Malayan Emergency and was mentioned in dispatches. Promoted to the substantive rank of captain on 5 May 1955, he studied at the Royal Military College of Science, obtaining an engineering degree. He returned to Malaya, commanding the 28th Commonwealth Brigade Ordnance Field Park Regiment, based at Taiping, then served with the 1st British Corps of the British Army of the Rhine in Germany.

Promoted to major on 16 March 1962, he was posted to Northern Ireland in 1969. In 1971, he was a major in the RAOC, serving as deputy assistant director of ordnance services and senior ammunition technical officer in Northern Ireland and commanding the Explosive Ordnance and Disposal Team.

=== George Cross ===
On 20 October 1971, one month after a bomb killed one of his colleagues at Castlerobin, County Antrim, Styles was called to defuse a similar bomb left in a telephone booth in the bar of the oft-bombed Europa Hotel in Belfast, the main hotel used by journalists posted to Northern Ireland to report on the Troubles.

From a sample of the IED in question, Styles knew that the box containing the explosive would be booby-trapped, with micro switches at the top or bottom which would set off the bomb if the container was tilted or the lid removed, aiming to kill the bomb disposal experts. He built a mock-up of the bomb to work out his method. X-rays showed that the bomb contained approximately 15 lb of explosives. He and two colleagues, Alan Clouter and Captain Roger Mendham, took seven hours to disable its electrical circuits, after which the explosive was hauled onto the pavement outside the hotel and destroyed in a controlled explosion. Two days later, he was recalled to the same hotel to deal with a second bomb, this time containing 40 lb of explosives. Extra wiring, micro switches, and many redundant circuits had been added to confuse the bomb disposal experts. The second bomb took nine hours to disarm. In all, Styles and his team defused more than 1,000 bombs.

It was announced on 11 January 1972 that Styles had been awarded the George Cross. The citation for the award was printed in the London Gazette on 10 January 1972, reading:

St. James's Palace, London S.W.I,

11th January 1972.
The QUEEN has been graciously pleased to approve the award of the George Cross to the undermentioned:
Major Stephen George STYLES (383996) Royal Army Ordnance Corps.
As Senior Ammunition Technical Officer, Northern Ireland, Major Styles was responsible for the supervision of the Explosive Ordnance Disposal teams in the Royal Army Ordnance Corps deployed to deal with the ever-increasing number of explosive devices used in the terrorist campaign.

On 20 October 1971, Major Styles was called to assist with a device of an apparently new design placed in a public telephone kiosk in Belfast's comparatively new, and largest, hotel, the Europa. Major Styles immediately went to the scene and, having ensured that the military and police had secured the area and evacuation of personnel had also been effected, took charge of the operation of neutralising, removing and dismantling the bomb.

Investigation revealed that the bomb was of a new and complicated construction with anti-handling devices' to defeat attempts to disarm it. Until the electrical circuit had been neutralised, the slightest movement could have set it off. The device contained between 10 and 15 Ibs of explosive and could have caused instant death as well as extensive damage. No-one was more aware of the destructive capability of the bomb than Major Styles, yet he placed himself at great personal risk to minimise the danger to his team, to confirm the success of each stage of the operation, and to ensure the practicability of the next stage. The whole operation took seven hours to plan and execute and was completely successful.

Two days later he was again called to the same hotel where a second bomb had been laid by armed terrorists. This bomb was found to be an even larger device with a charge of over 30 Ibs of explosive, anti-handling devices, and a confusion of electrical circuits; it was clearly intended to defeat disarming techniques and to kill the operator trying to neutralise it. Major Styles again immediately took charge of the situation and successfully disarmed, removed and dismantled the bomb, this time after 9 hours' intense and dangerous work.

As a result of his courageous and dedicated resolution, two determined and ingenious attempts by terrorists against life and property were defeated, and technical information was obtained which will help to save the lives of operators faced with such devices in future.

Throughout each operation Major Styles displayed a calm resolution in control, a degree of technical skill and personal bravery in circumstances of extreme danger far beyond that of the call of duty. His work was an outstanding inspiration and example, particularly to others engaged in this dangerous type of work.

He received his medal from Queen Elizabeth II at an investiture at Buckingham Palace two months later, on 28 March 1972. The uniform he wore while defusing bombs in Northern Ireland is on display at the Imperial War Museum. After leaving Northern Ireland in 1972, Styles was promoted to lieutenant colonel on 30 June 1973. He became chief ammunition technical officer, with responsibility for all RAOC bomb disposal teams in the UK and overseas.

== Retirement and post-army career ==
Styles retired from the army on 16 October 1974, and became an adviser for various companies on anti-terrorist techniques. He wrote Bombs Have No Pity in 1975. He was featured in the Thames Television programme, Death on the Rock, in 1988, in which he commented on various aspects of a counter-terrorism operation in Gibraltar in which three PIRA members had been killed earlier that year.

== Personal life ==
Styles married Mary Rose Woolgar in 1952; the couple had a son and two daughters. He enjoyed rifle and game shooting, and collected rare cartridges.

Styles died on 1 August 2006, and is buried with his parents at Snell Hatch Cemetery, Crawley, West Sussex.
