= Ezra Glantz =

American handball player (born 1945)

Personal information
- Full name: Ezra "Jerry" Glantz
- Nationality: United States
- Born: January 28, 1945 (age 81) Los Angeles, California

Sport
- Sport: Handball

Ezra "Jerry" Glantz (born January 28, 1945, in Los Angeles, California) is an American handball goalkeeper.

In 1976 he played as the goalkeeper of the USA Olympic team in Handball at the 1976 Montreal Summer Olympic games.

He was National goalkeeper for the Israeli National Handball team as well. He lived in Tel Aviv from 1954 till 1990. He won eight national championships as goalkeeper for several Israeli Handball teams and competed for years in the European Cup Handball Championshipson behalf of Israel.

Glantz was one of the original founders of Israeli Baseball and Fastpitch softball. As coach, many members of Israel's national baseball team players were groomed by Glantz. In July 2009 Jerry Glantz was inducted into the Israeli Hall of Fame.
