= Ezra Jacob Kraus =

American botanist and horticulturist (1885–1960)

Ezra Jacob Kraus (March 19, 1885 – February 28, 1960) was an American botanist and horticulturist. Kraus was born in Ingham County, Michigan and earned a bachelor's degree at Michigan State Agricultural College in 1907. He taught horticulture at Oregon State College, (now Oregon State University) for several years before earning a PhD in botany at the University of Chicago in 1917. He returned to Oregon State where he served as dean of the Division of Basic Arts and Sciences (1917–1919), and in 1919 was hired by the University of Wisconsin, where he taught botany until 1927. He then taught botany at the University of Chicago, where he served as chair of the department from 1934 to 1947 and officially retired from the university in 1949, after which he became a visiting professor at Oregon State College. He died in 1960 in Corvallis.
