= Ezra Chitando =

Ezra Chitando is a Zimbabwean religious studies Academic. He is Professor of History and Phenomenology of Religion at the University of Zimbabwe, in Harare, Zimbabwe. He serves as Theology Consultant on HIV and AIDS with EHAIA, the Ecumenical HIV and AIDS Initiatives and Advocacy, of the World Council of Churches. In this capacity, he has engaged in gender activism, specifically concerned with transforming socio-cultural and religious notions of masculinity.

== Background ==
Chitando holds a DPhil degree (University of Zimbabwe, 2001), a MA degree (University of Zimbabwe, 1993), and a BA HONS degree (University of Zimbabwe, 1991), all in the study of religion. He has held visiting positions and research fellowships with institutions such as the University of Bamberg (Germany), Nordic Africa Institute (Sweden), and the University of Edinburgh (UK).

Chitando has researched and published about contemporary religion in Africa, mostly in Zimbabwe.

== Writings ==
=== As sole author ===
- Troubled but not destroyed: African theology in dialogue with HIV/AIDS (2009)
- Living with Hope: African Churches and HIV/AIDS (2007)
- Acting in Hope: African Churches and HIV/AIDS (2007)
- Singing culture: a study of Gospel music in Zimbabwe (2002)

=== As co-author ===
- Reimagining Christianity and Sexual Diversity in Africa (2021)

=== As editor ===
- Innovation and Competition in Zimbabwean Pentecostalism (2021)
- The Zimbabwe Council of Churches and development in Zimbabwe (2021)
- African Initiated Churches facing HIV and AIDS in Zimbabwe (2021)
- Politics and religion in Zimbabwe : the deification of Robert G. Mugabe (2020)
- Religion and development in Africa (2020)
- African traditions in the study of religion, diaspora and gendered societies (2017)
- Redemptive masculinities : men, HIV, and religion (2012)
- Prophets, profits and the Bible in Zimbabwe Festschrift for Aynos Masotcha Moyo (2013)
