= George Styles (footballer) =

Australian rules footballer, born 1904

Personal information
- Full name: George Styles
- Born: 23 January 1904
- Died: 27 February 1984 (aged 80)
- Original team: Port Melbourne
- Height: 168 cm (5 ft 6 in)
- Weight: 74 kg (163 lb)

Playing career^{1}
Years	Club	Games (Goals)
1926–27	Carlton	11 (1)
1928	North Melbourne	1 (0)
Total		12 (1)
- ^{1} Playing statistics correct to the end of 1928.

George Styles (23 January 1904 – 27 February 1984) was an Australian rules footballer who played with Carlton and North Melbourne in the Victorian Football League (VFL).
