= Ezra C. Stiles =

American landscape architect

Ezra C. Stiles (September 26, 1891 – January 27, 1974) was an American landscape architect. He also worked as an urban planner, writer, mapmaker, and painter.

A descendant of Yale University president Ezra Stiles, Ezra Clarke Stiles was born in Painted Post, New York, and graduated from Penn State in 1914 with a degree in Forestry and Landscape Architecture. He began as a community planner in Charlotte, North Carolina, as an employee of John Nolan, a landscape architect in Boston. In 1915, he moved to Pittsburgh, Pennsylvania, to become a draftsman for A.W. Smith, a garden design and florist firm.

In 1926, Stiles founded a landscape architecture firm in Pittsburgh, and ultimately became known as one of the region's top landscape architects. Among his clients were prominent Pittsburgh families (the Scaifes, Corsons, Frownes, and Garmens); corporations (Carnegie Steel Works and Rockwell Manufacturing Corporation), universities (Furman University in Greenville, South Carolina), and city planners (he designed two city parks to mark Pittsburgh's bicentennial). In 1938, he laid out the McKeesport Rose Garden and Arboretum in the Pittsburgh suburb of McKeesport, Pennsylvania.

In the 1960s, Stiles' firm worked with two others to expand the Allegheny County park system.

Stiles wrote at least three books:

- Framing the Home Landscape with Pittsburgh Steel Company (1929). 20 pp.
- Rock Gardening for the Small Place (Doubleday, Doran & Company, 1935) 94 pp.
- The Silver Sturgeon

He and historian Paul C. Bowman drew a lavishly illustrated map of the American Expeditionary Force's participation in World War I's Meuse-Argonne Offensive; it is preserved by the Library of Congress. Other maps depicted Pittsburgh in 1899 and Frick Park in 1938.

He had at least one son, Ezra C. Stiles Jr. (1921-1957), who served as a captain in the U.S. Army Air Forces.

Some of Stiles' papers and drawings are preserved by the University of Pittsburgh.
