= Gordon Styles (footballer) =

Australian rules footballer

Personal information
- Full name: Gordon Styles
- Born: 4 July 1920
- Died: 23 November 1996 (aged 76)
- Original team: Croydon
- Height: 178 cm (5 ft 10 in)
- Weight: 80 kg (176 lb)

Playing career^{1}
Years	Club	Games (Goals)
1942–43, 1945	Richmond	16 (1)
- ^{1} Playing statistics correct to the end of 1945.

Gordon Styles (4 July 1920 – 23 November 1996) was a former Australian rules footballer who played with Richmond in the Victorian Football League (VFL).
