= Revolution at Sea saga =

Novel series by James L. Nelson

The Revolution at Sea Saga, sometimes known as the Isaac Biddlecomb Series, is a series of five novels written by James L. Nelson, published from 1997 to 2001. It centers around the exploits of protagonist Isaac Biddlecomb during the American Revolution, specifically the years 1775 through 1777.

== Storyline ==
The Revolution at Sea saga focuses on Isaac Biddlecomb and Ezra Rumstick, former smugglers for Isaac's surrogate father (and later father in law) William Stanton. Over the course of the series, Biddlecomb and Rumstick become increasingly involved with the naval aspect of the American Revolution, which brings them into contact with historical figures such as Benjamin Franklin and George Washington.

== Installments ==
The following titles represent the five novels in the Revolution at Sea Saga:

1. By Force of Arms (1997)
2. The Maddest Idea (1997)
3. The Continental Risque (1998)
4. Lords of the Ocean (1999)
5. All the Brave Fellows (2001)
6. The Falmouth Frigate (2022)

The following title is not part of the Revolution at Sea Saga, but uses several of the same characters:

- The French Prize (2015)

== Characters ==
The following is a list of the major characters in the Revolution at Sea Saga.

=== Isaac Biddlecomb ===
The protagonist of the series, a merchant turned naval captain. Biddlecomb becomes increasingly successful in his naval endeavors over the course of the series, leading him to increased fame within the American Navy and the Revolution itself. In Lords of the Ocean, Biddlecomb marries childhood friend Virginia Stanton. They have a son together, Jack Biddlecomb, who would later be the protagonist of The French Prize, a sequel to the Revolution at Sea Saga.

=== Ezra Rumstick ===
An old friend and shipmate of Biddlecomb's, Rumstick is a fierce revolutionary who becomes increasingly embroiled in the war, often while sailing alongside Biddlecomb.

=== Virginia Biddlecomb (née Stanton) ===
The rebellious daughter of William Stanton, Biddlecomb's employer and surrogate father, Virginia comes to love Biddlecomb and the two are married, eventually having a son together.

=== William Stanton ===
An American merchant who employed first Biddlecomb's father, then Biddlecomb himself. Stanton was responsible for introducing Biddlecomb to Rumstick, and for caring for Biddlecomb when his father was killed. Stanton later became Biddlecomb's father-in-law, and Jack Biddlecomb's grandfather.

=== Elisha Faircloth ===
Commander of the marines aboard Biddlecomb's ship, the USS Charlemagne.

=== Edward Fitzgerald ===
Major Edward Fitzgerald is advisor to George Washington in The Maddest Idea. Although his personality and character traits were created by the author, it is a historical fact that Washington had a right-hand man by the same name. In The Maddest Idea, he is assigned with the job of flushing out the traitor who turned Biddlecomb over to the British; Fitzgerald appears again in Lords of the Ocean.

== Reception ==
Publishers Weekly has praised The Continental Risque and By Force of Arms, calling the first book an "engaging start to what promises to be a fine adventure series in a neglected milieu". The Bangor Daily News reviewed Lords of the Ocean, writing that the series would appeal to "anyone who likes fast-paced stories of battles, boats and heroes". A reviewer for the Lodi News-Sentinel praised All The Brave Fellows, saying it gave a fresh outlook to familiar material.

Patrick O'Brian said of the first book in the Revolution at Sea Saga "Authenticity runs throughout the book, carrying total conviction," and of the author, "...Nelson writes with the eagerness of a young man sailing his first command." He has also been called "one of today's most gifted historical novelists."
