= Gordon George Styles =

British engineer and entrepreneur (born 1964)

Gordon Styles
- Born: Gordon George Styles; 1964 (age 60–61); Wimbledon, London, United Kingdom
- Years active: 1987–present
- Known for: Founder & President of rapid prototyping company Star Rapid

Gordon George Styles (born 1964) is a British engineer and entrepreneur. He is the founder and president of Star Rapid, an international provider of rapid prototyping and low-volume manufacturing services.

== Early life and education ==
Styles was born in Wimbledon, London and grew up in Middlesbrough, North Yorkshire in England. He attended the Durham University Business School’s GAP Program, a business development program for entrepreneurs.

== Career ==
Styles began his career in 1993 at Styles Rapid Prototyping, later known as Styles Rapid Product Development Limited (Styles RPD). STYLES RPD was voted Teesside Small Business of the Year 1996 as well as Gordon Styles being awarded Teesside Business Executive of the Year 1996. Under Styles’ supervision, Styles RPD grew to a nationwide technology company from 10 to 73 employees and nearly $6 million in annual sales. In April 2000, the company was sold to the Japanese company ARRK. After the sale of Styles RPD, Styles invested in Springer Rapid. Due to low-cost competition emerging in China, in 2005 Springer Rapid was closed. Later that year, Styles moved to Dongguan city, located in China on the outskirts of Hong Kong, and founded Star Rapid. In 2018, Star Rapid had more than 250 global employees and a 60,000 ft^{2} factory space.
