= List of people from the Lehigh Valley =

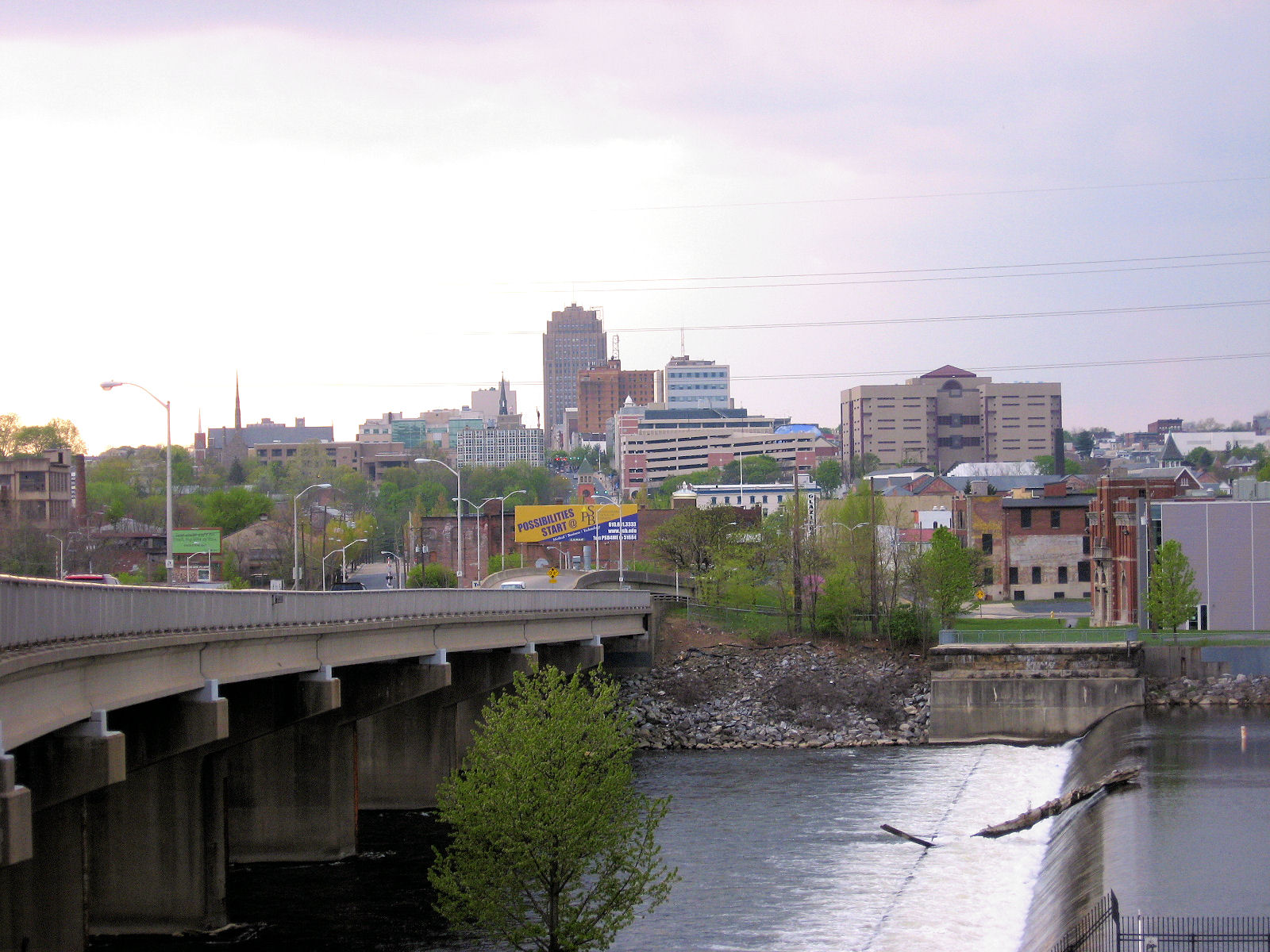
Allentown, the largest city in the Lehigh Valley, third-largest city in Pennsylvania, and county seat of Lehigh County, in May 2010

The following is a list of notable people who were born, or lived a significant portion of their lives, in the Lehigh Valley region of eastern Pennsylvania.

== Authors, journalists, playwrights, and poets ==
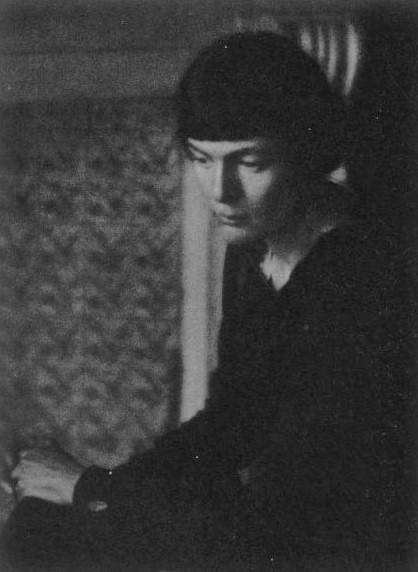
H.D.

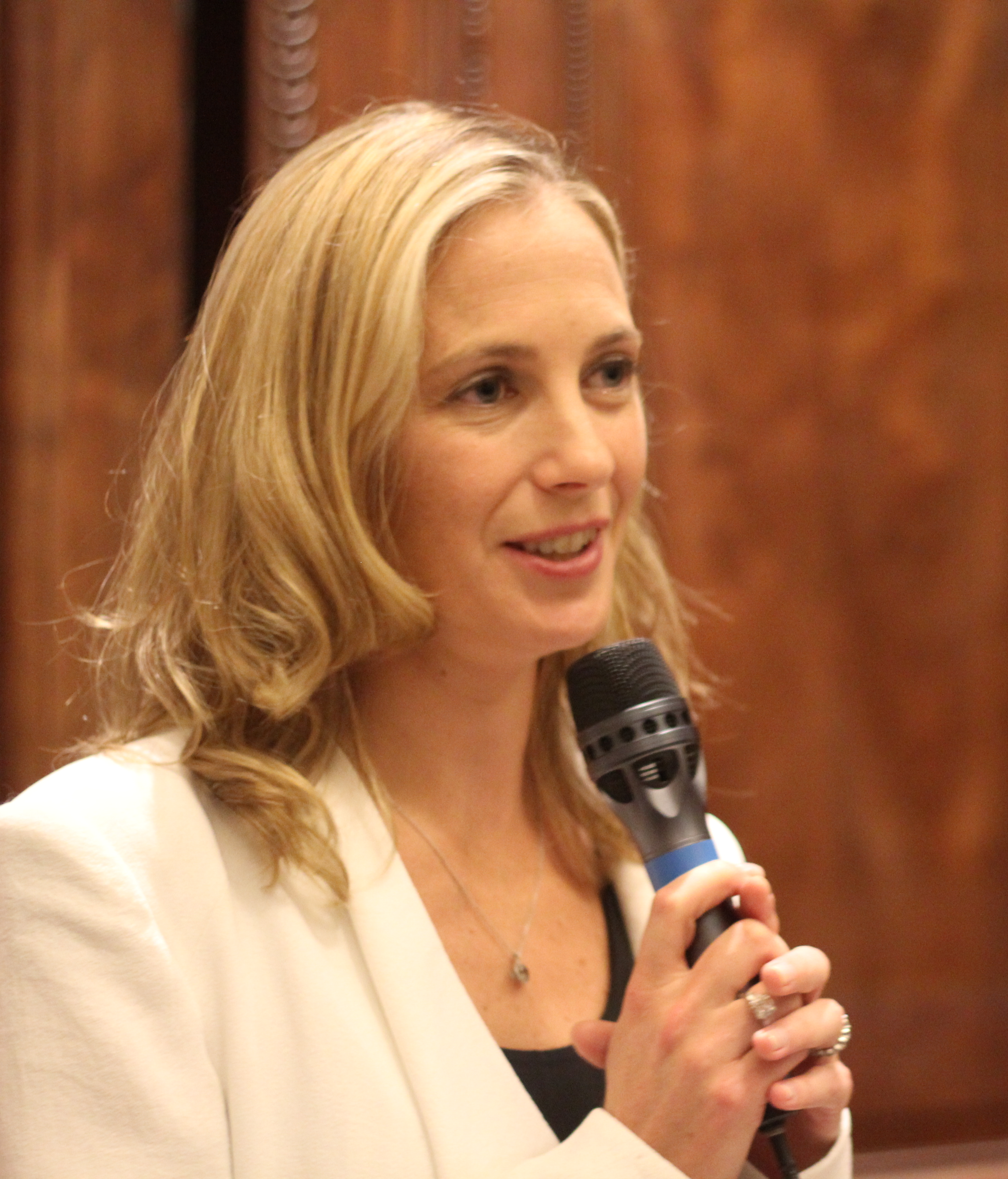
Lauren Weisberger

- Christian Bauman, novelist
- Stephen Vincent Benét, former Pulitzer Prize-winning author and poet
- Charles Bierbauer, former dean, University of South Carolina, and former CNN correspondent
- John Birmelin, former Pennsylvania German language poet and playwright
- Clair Blank, former author, Beverly Gray series of books
- Katherine Boehret, former technology journalist, The Wall Street Journal
- Jen Bryant, poet and author
- Solomon DeLong (pen name Obediah Grouthomel), former Pennsylvania German newspaper columnist
- Michael Flynn, former science fiction author
- Matthew Giobbi, author
- H.D., former writer and modernist poet
- Alfred Hassler, former journalist and author
- Carmen Maria Machado, short story author and essayist
- Francis March, former academic and founder, comparative linguistics in Old English
- Randall Munroe, writer, xkcd comic series
- Sandra Novack, novelist
- Alix Olson, spoken word artist
- Michael Pocalyko, business executive and financial novelist
- Marci Shore, author and historian
- Elsie Singmaster, former author
- Jennifer Storm, author, Blackout Girl: Growing Up and Drying Out in America and Leave the Light On
- Lauren Weisberger, author, The Devil Wears Prada

== Business and politics ==
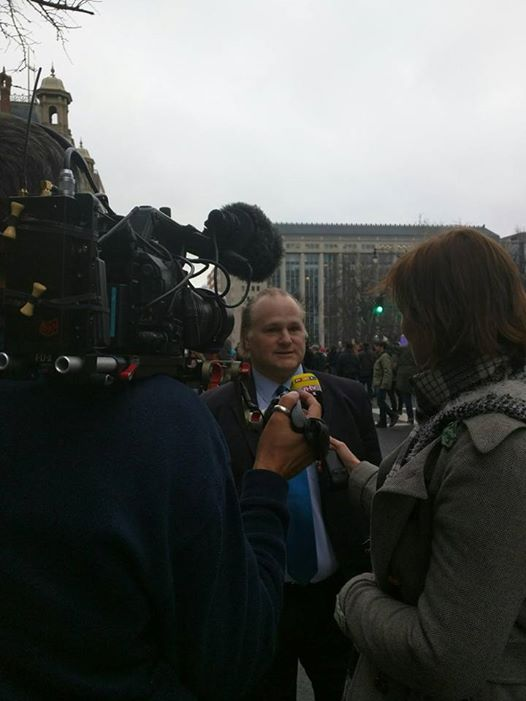
Michael Johns

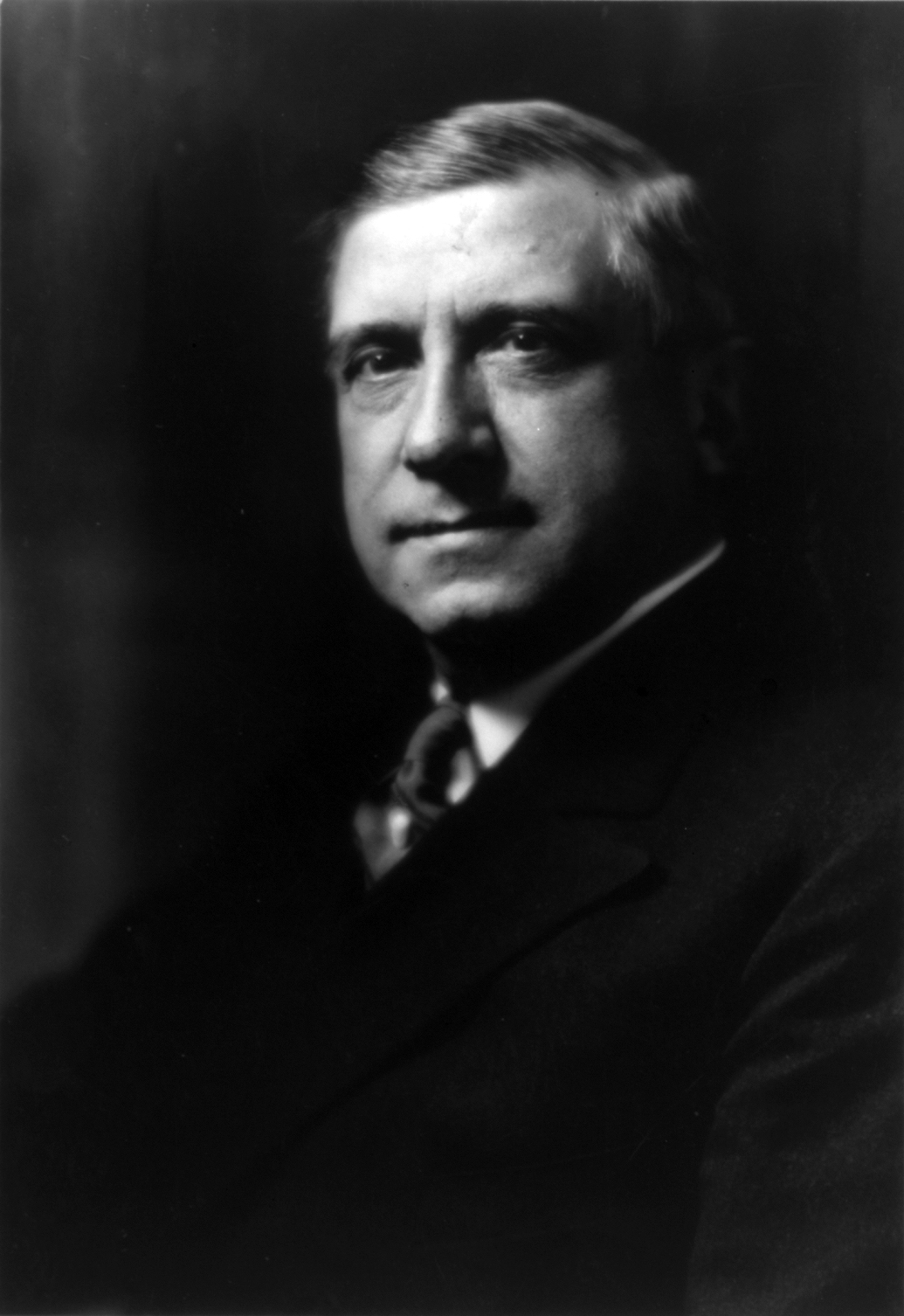
Charles Schwab

- Roy Afflerbach, lobbyist and former Allentown mayor
- William F. Andrews, former Florida state representative
- James S. Biery, former member of Congress
- Joseph Force Crater, former justice, New York State Supreme Court
- James B. Cunningham, former U.S. ambassador to Israel and Afghanistan
- Charlie Dent, former member of Congress
- Charles L. Gerlach, former member of Congress
- Fred B. Gernerd, former member of Congress
- Rick Glazier, former North Carolina state representative
- Murray H. Goodman, former real estate developer
- Eugene Grace, former president, Bethlehem Steel
- Erskine Hazard, co-founder, Lehigh Coal & Navigation Company, Lehigh Canal, and Lehigh Crane Iron Company
- David W. Hess, former New Hampshire state representative
- Lee Iacocca, former chairman and CEO, Chrysler
- Michael Johns, healthcare executive and former White House presidential speechwriter
- John Kline, former member of Congress
- Marcus C. L. Kline, former member of Congress
- Fred E. Lewis, former member of Congress
- Norton Lichtenwalner, former member of Congress
- Ryan Mackenzie, U.S. representative for Pennsylvania
- John E. McGlade, former chairman, chief executive officer, and president, Air Products
- Peter Newhard, former member of Congress
- Andrew Horatio Reeder, former governor of Kansas
- Donald L. Ritter, former member of Congress
- James Ritter, former member, Pennsylvania House of Representatives
- Charles M. Schwab, former president, Bethlehem Steel
- Samuel Sitgreaves, former U.S. commissioner to Great Britain and member of Congress
- Richard A. Snelling, former governor of Vermont
- George Taylor, Founding Father and Second Continental Congress delegate who signed the Declaration of Independence
- Susan Wild, former member of Congress

== Film, television, and stage ==
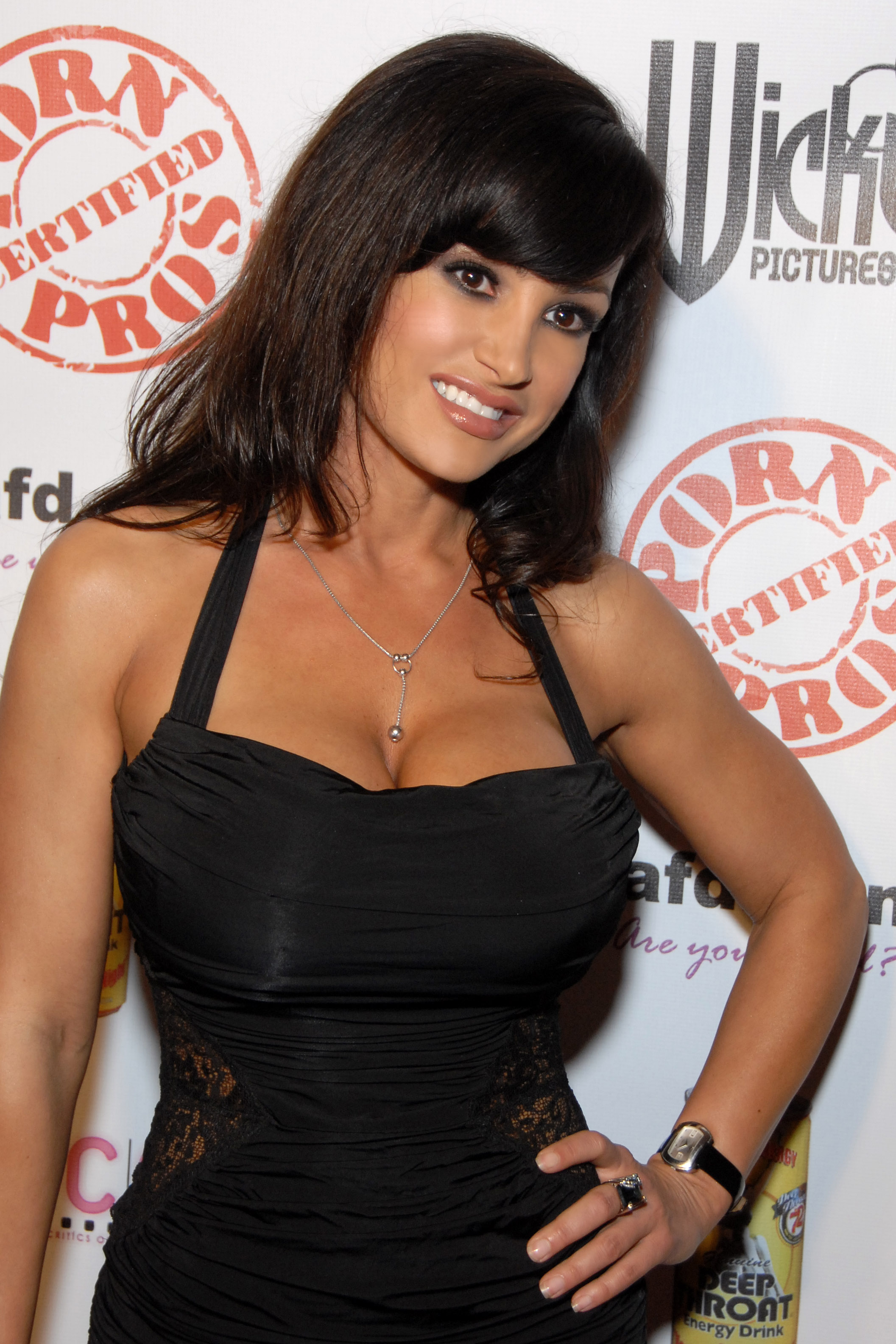
Lisa Ann

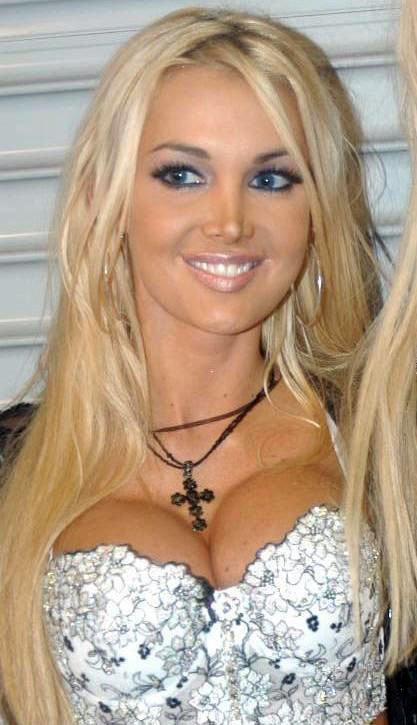
Devon

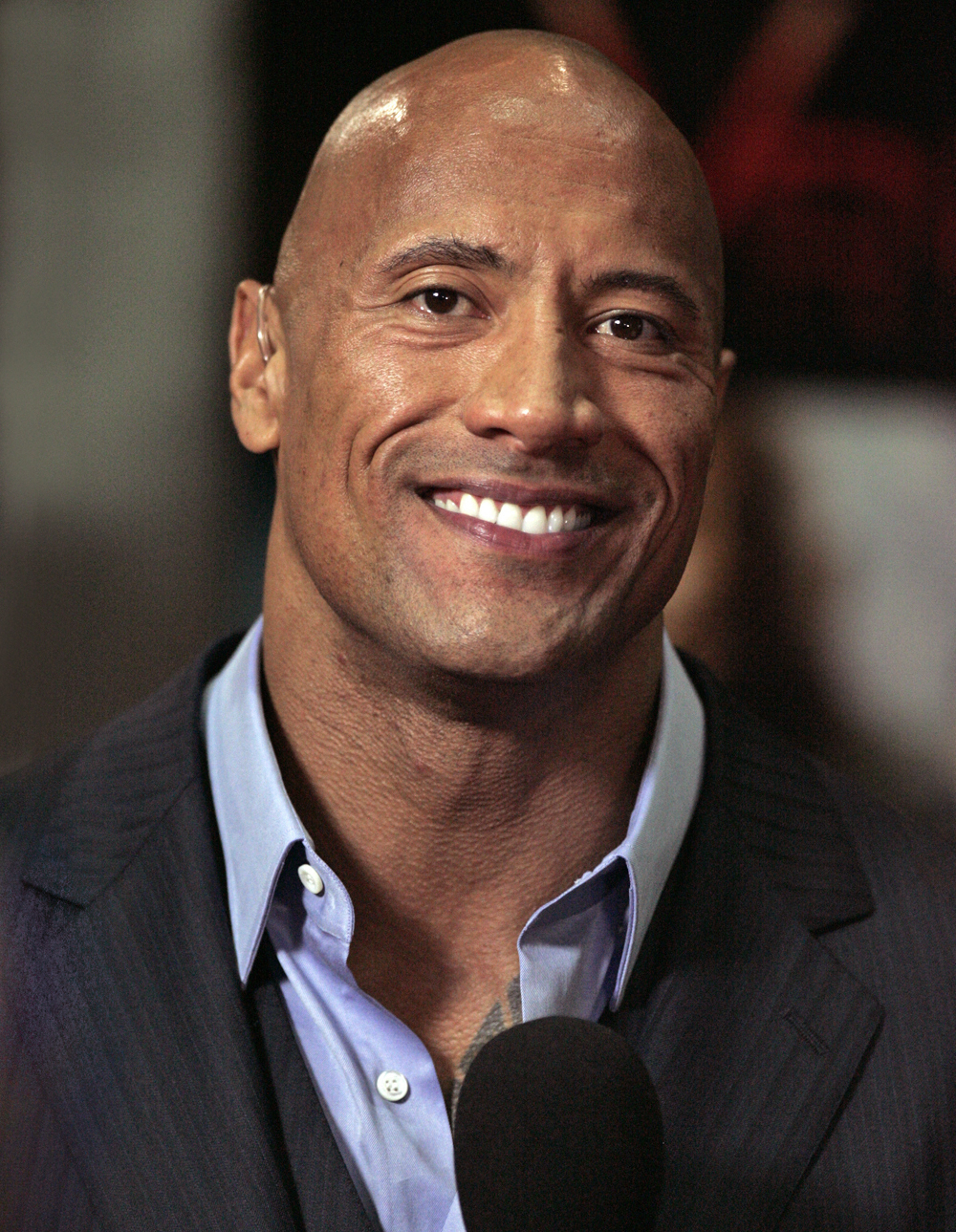
Dwayne "The Rock" Johnson

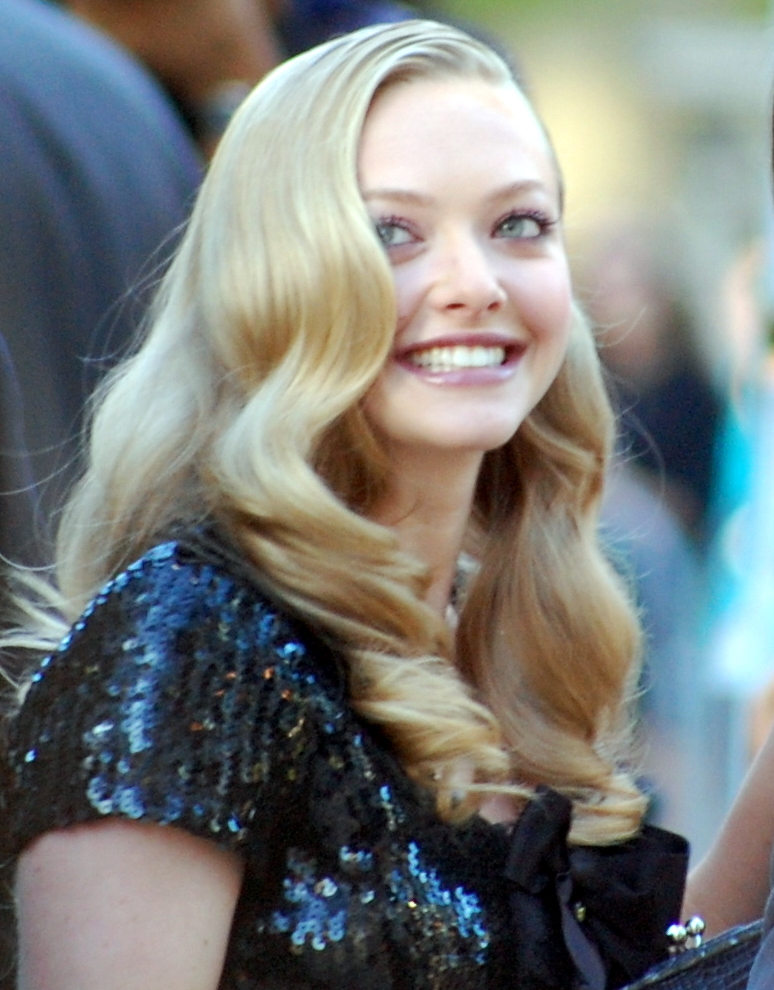
Amanda Seyfried

- Lisa Ann, adult film actress
- Alexandra Chando, actress, As the World Turns
- Jack Coleman, television actor, Dynasty, Heroes, The Office, and Castle
- Dane DeHaan, television and film actor, In Treatment, Chronicle, and Valerian and the City of a Thousand Planets
- Devon, adult film actress
- Omar Doom, actor, Inglourious Basterds
- Oakes Fegley, actor, The Goldfinch
- Winslow Fegley, actor, Lyle, Lyle, Crocodile
- Jonathan Frakes, actor, Star Trek: The Next Generation
- Mel Harris, actress, Thirtysomething
- Althea Henley, former actress
- Tim Heidecker, actor and comedian, Adult Swim's Tim and Eric Awesome Show, Great Job!
- Dwayne Johnson ("The Rock"), actor and former professional wrestler
- Daniel Dae Kim, actor, Lost
- Gelsey Kirkland, ballerina
- Carson Kressley, fashion consultant, Bravo's Queer Eye
- Christopher Lennertz, film, television, and video game music composer, Alvin and the Chipmunks and Supernatural
- William Marchant, former playwright and screenwriter
- Michael McDonald, costume designer and 2009 Tony Award and Drama Desk nominee for Hair
- Kristen McMenamy, fashion model
- Kate Micucci, actress, comedian, artist, and singer-songwriter
- Lara Jill Miller, voice actress, The Life and Times of Juniper Lee
- Aimee Mullins, model and actress
- Robert Newhard, former cinematographer
- Sally Jessy Raphael, former television talk show host
- Daniel Roebuck, actor, Lost
- Amanda Seyfried, model and actress, Mean Girls, Big Love, Mamma Mia!, and Les Misérables
- Sheetal Sheth, actress, Looking for Comedy in the Muslim World
- Dana Snyder, voice actor, Aqua Teen Hunger Force
- Sarah Strohmeyer, novelist
- Andrea Tantaros, political analyst and commentator
- Christine Taylor, actress
- Jonathan Taylor Thomas, actor, Home Improvement
- David Zippel, Tony Award-winning lyricist, City of Angels

== Music ==
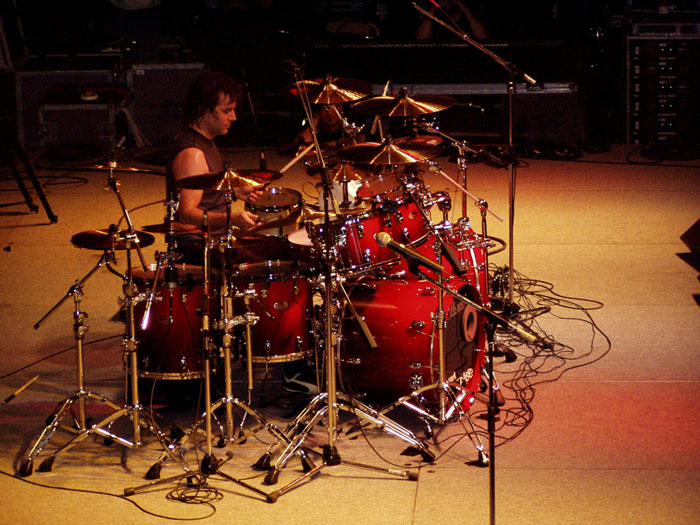
Jimmy DeGrasso

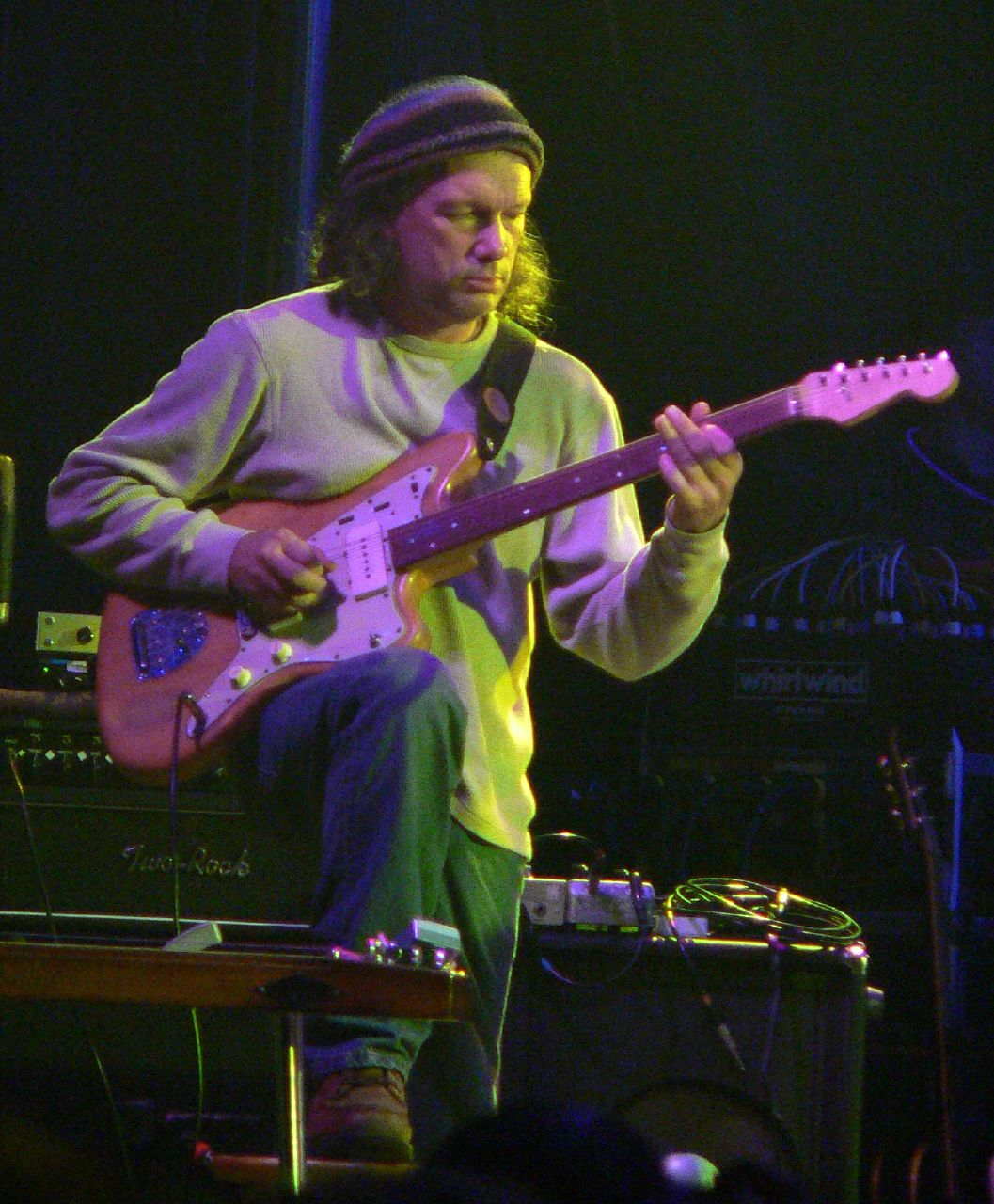
Steve Kimock

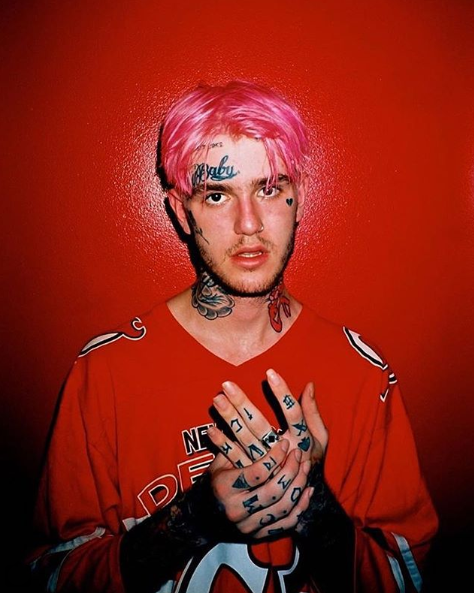
Lil Peep

- Rick Braun, smooth jazz trumpet player
- Lillian Briggs, former rockabilly musician
- Howard J. Buss, contemporary classical music composer
- Leon Carr, former Broadway composer and television advertising songwriter
- Jimmy DeGrasso, heavy metal drummer, Ozzy Osbourne, Alice Cooper Band, Megadeth, Dokken, and Ratt
- Walt Groller, Grammy-nominated polka musician
- George Hrab, rock and funk musician
- Keith Jarrett, jazz musician
- Steve Kimock, rock musician
- Ludwig Lenel, former organist and composer
- Lil Peep, former rapper
- Albertus L. Meyers, former music conductor, Allentown Band
- Mulgrew Miller, jazz pianist
- Farley Parkenfarker, keyboardist
- Mike Portnoy, progressive metal drummer
- Thom Schuyler, country music singer and songwriter
- Shadow Gallery, progressive metal band
- Melissa VanFleet, alternative metal singer, songwriter, and musician
- Donald Voorhees, former Emmy-nominated orchestra conductor
- Jordan White, rock musician
- Stephanie Woodling, opera singer

== Religion ==
- Frank Buchman, founder of the Oxford Group and the Moral Re-Armament religious movement
- Tim Keller, former Christian pastor at Redeemer Presbyterian Church and author, The Reason for God
- Nathan Homer Knorr, former religious leader and third president of Jehovah's Witnesses

== Science ==
- David Bader, director, Institute of Data Science, New Jersey Institute of Technology, and professor
- Michael Behe, biochemist at Lehigh University and intelligent design proponent
- James McKeen Cattell, first U.S. psychology professor
- Richard Diehl, archaeologist and Mesoamerica scholar
- Edwin Drake, former oil driller
- Terry Hart, former Space Shuttle Challenger astronaut
- Aaron D. O'Connell, created the world's first quantum machine
- Beth Shapiro, evolutionary molecular biologist, University of California, Santa Cruz
- Walter O. Snelling, former chemist and explosives expert who discovered propane

== Sports ==
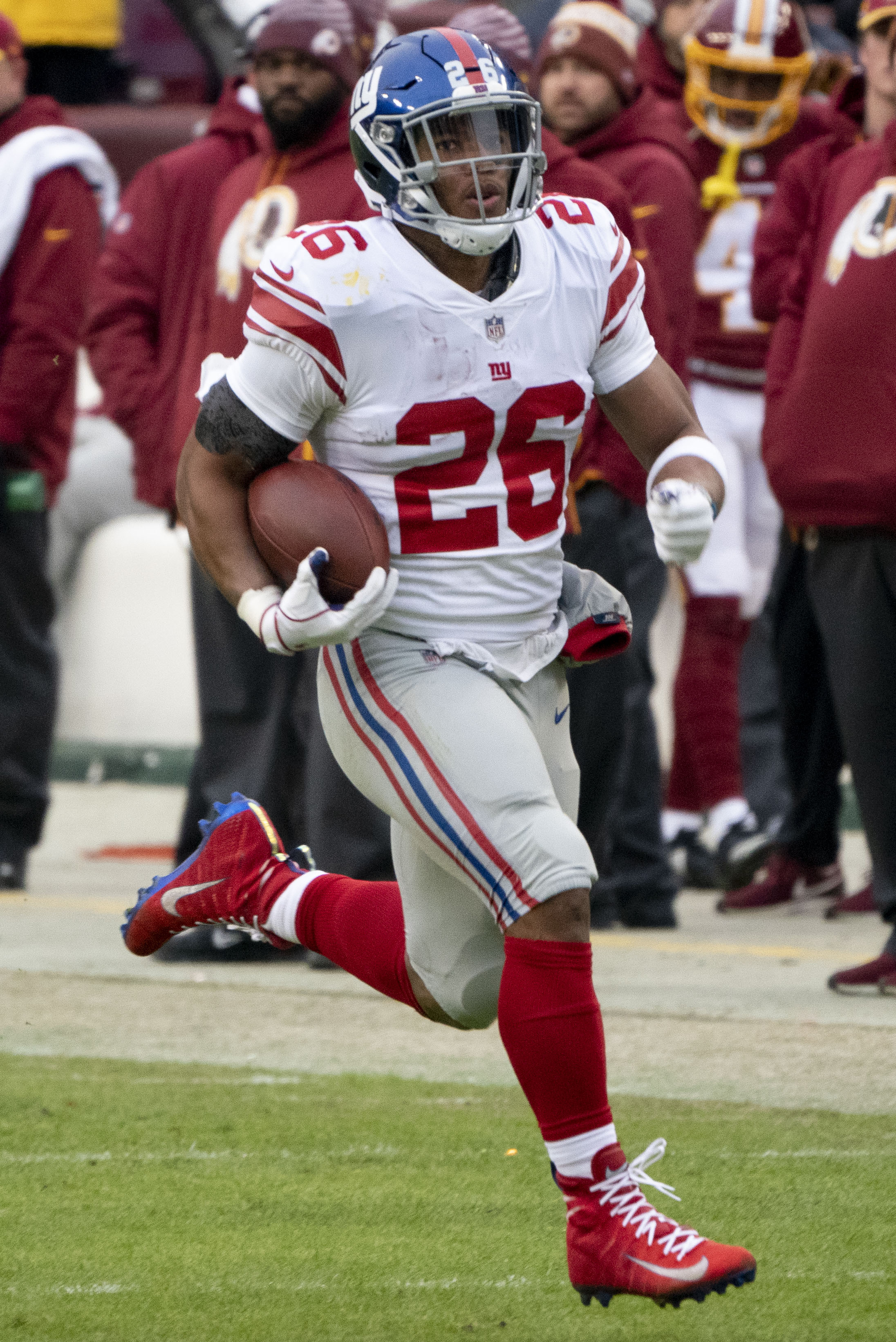
Saquon Barkley

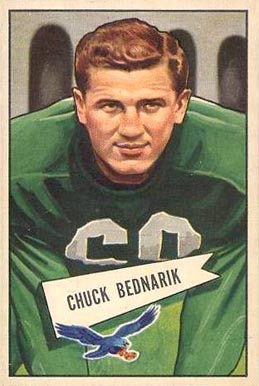
Chuck Bednarik

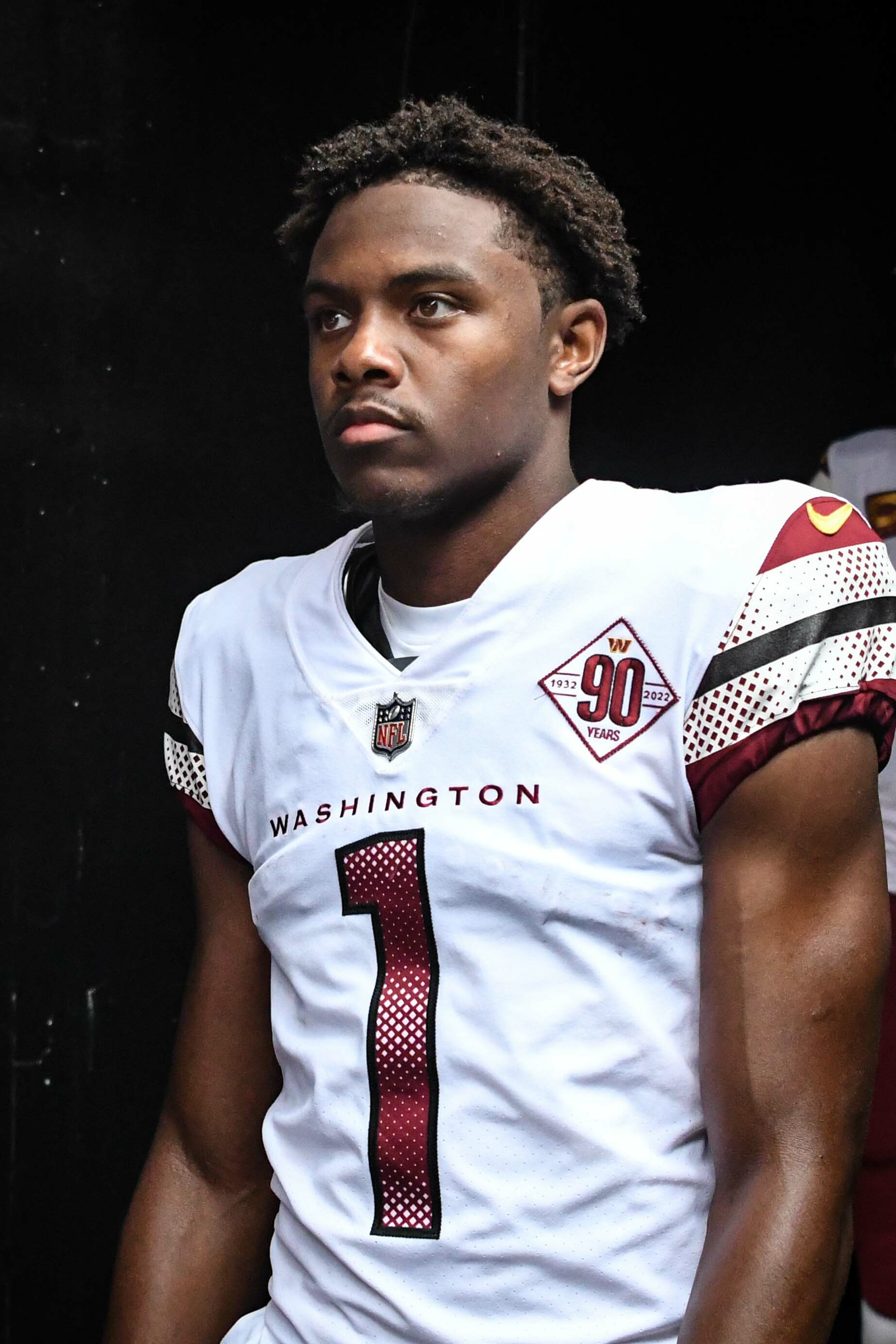
Jahan Dotson

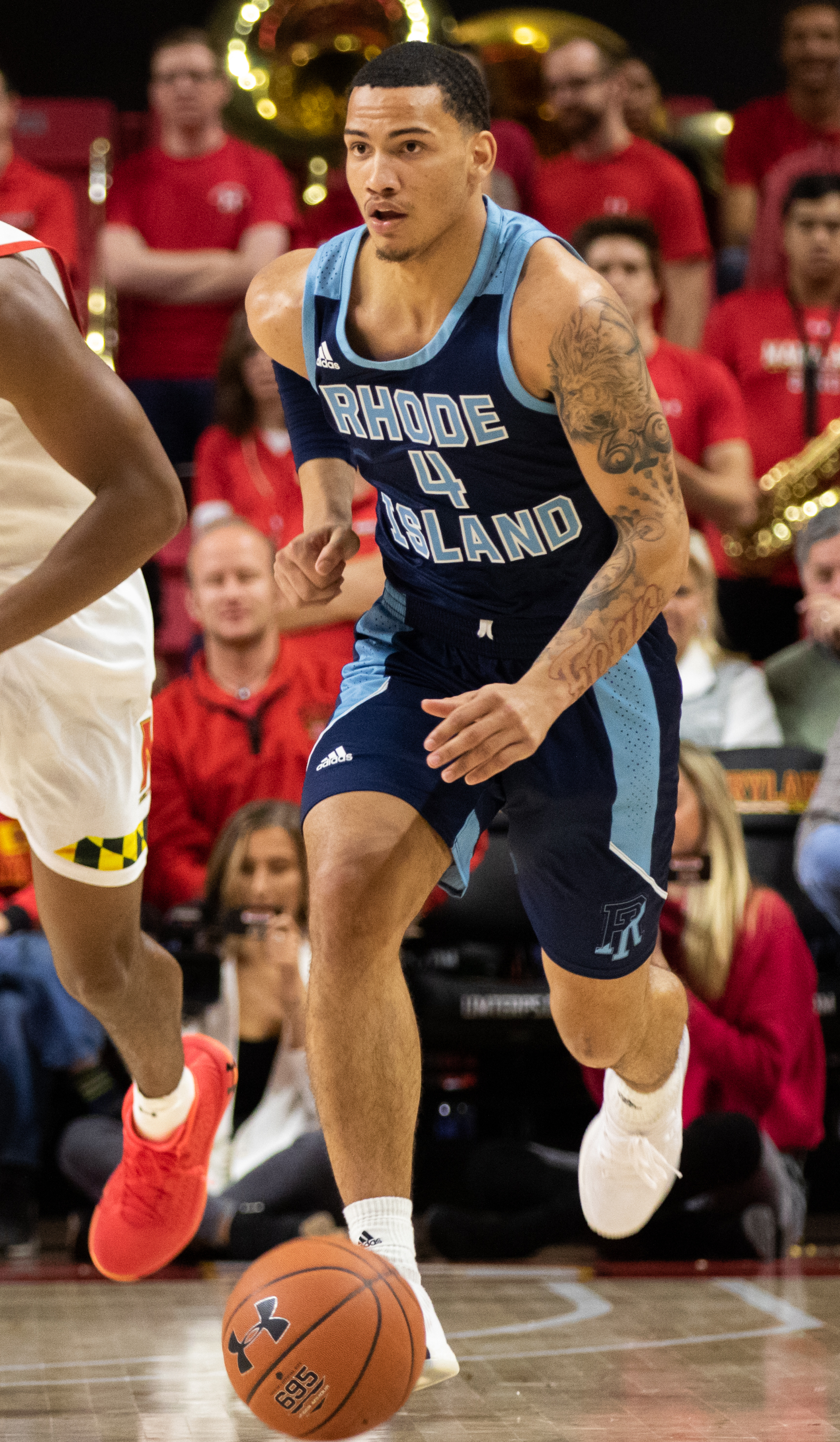
Tyrese Martin

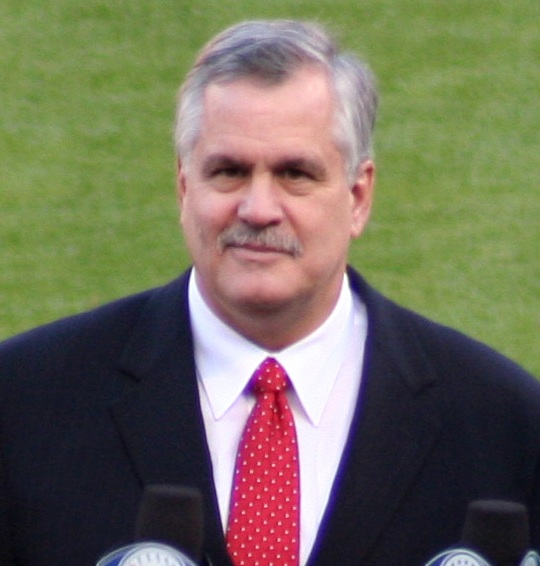
Matt Millen

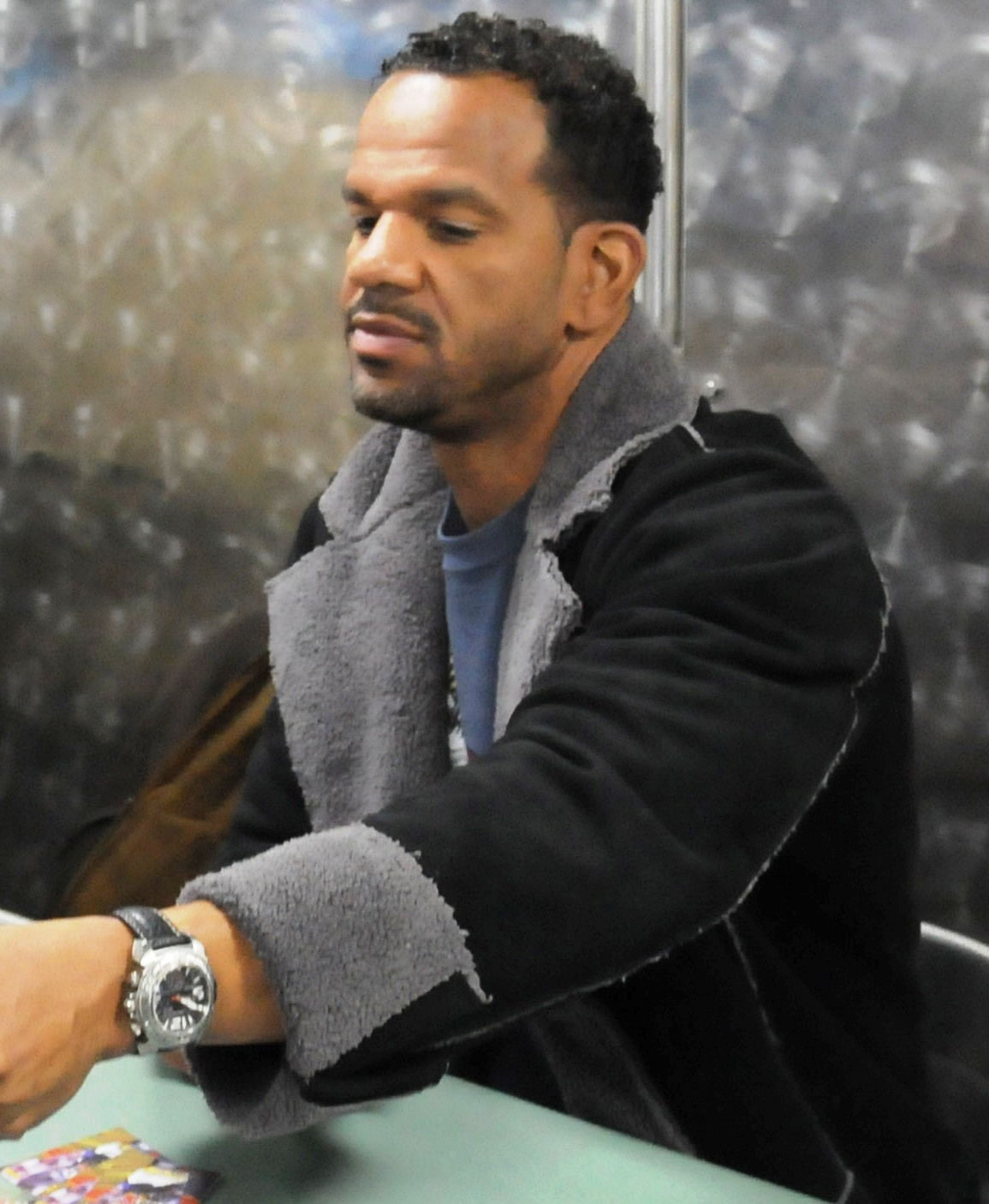
Andre Reed

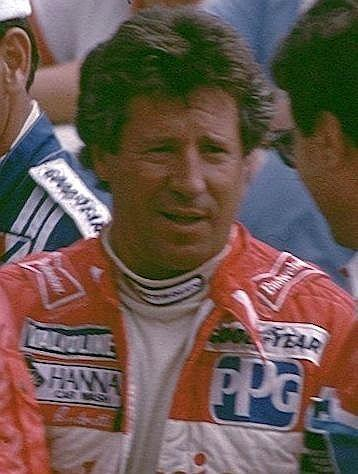
Mario Andretti

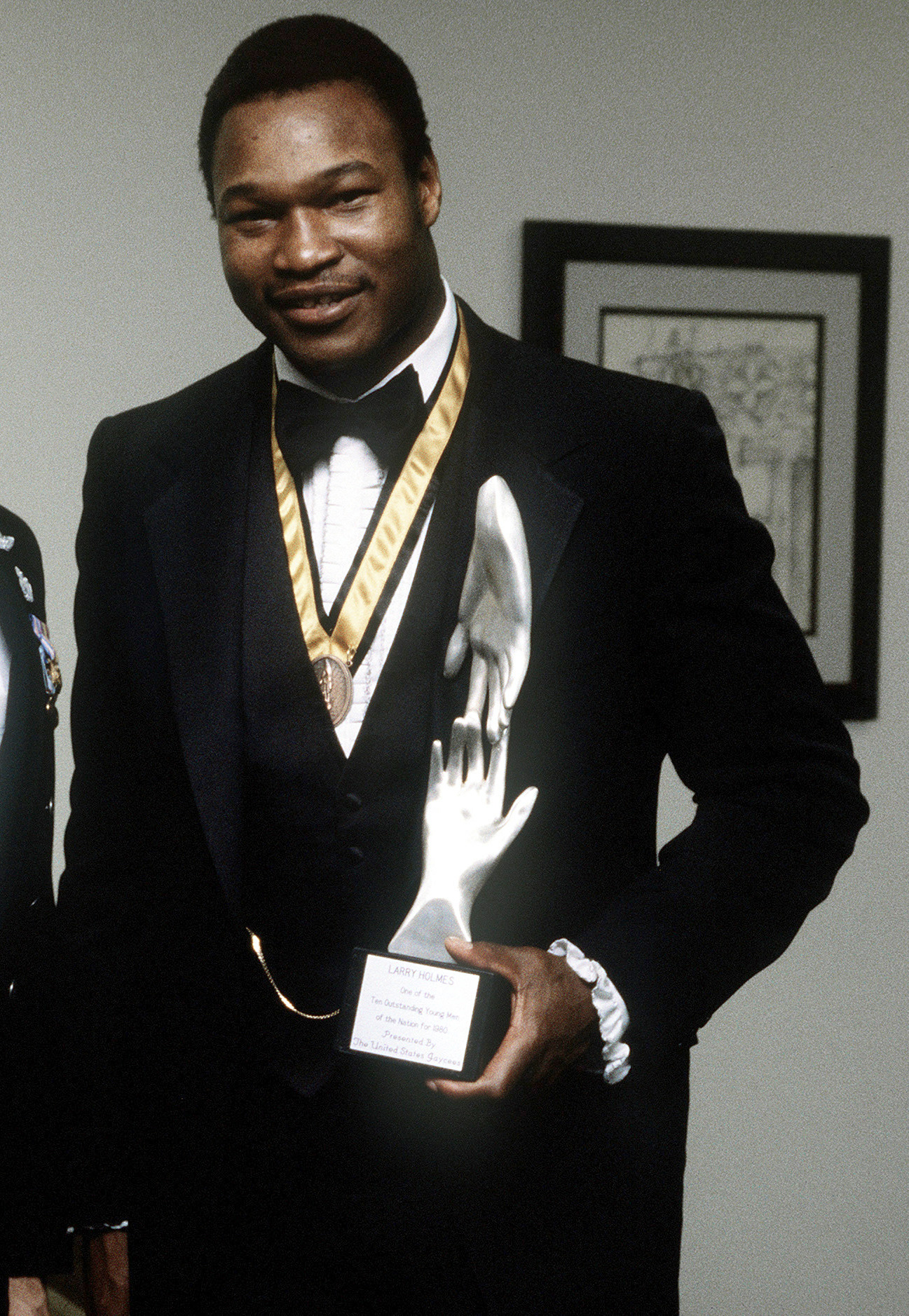
Larry Holmes, "The Easton Assassin"

=== Collegiate sports ===
- Chuck Amato, former head college football coach, North Carolina State
- Steve Aponavicius, former placekicker and all-time Boston College Eagles football scoring leader
- Parke H. Davis, former college football coach, Amherst, Lafayette, and Wisconsin
- Jordan Oliver, two-time NCAA wrestling champion and Real American Freestyle fighter

=== Major League Baseball (MLB) ===
- Slim Emmerich, former professional baseball player, New York Giants
- Bob Heffner, former professional baseball player, Boston Red Sox, California Angels, and Cleveland Indians
- Gary Lavelle, former professional baseball player, Oakland Athletics, San Francisco Giants, and Toronto Blue Jays
- John Meister, former professional baseball player, New York Metropolitans
- Jeff Mutis, former professional baseball player, Cleveland Indians and Florida Marlins
- Jimmie Schaffer, former professional baseball player, Chicago Cubs, Chicago White Sox, Cincinnati Reds, New York Mets, Philadelphia Phillies, and St. Louis Cardinals
- Dave Schneck, former professional baseball player, New York Mets
- Brian Schneider, former professional baseball player, Montreal Expos, New York Mets, Philadelphia Phillies, and Washington Nationals
- Curt Simmons, former professional baseball player, California Angels, Chicago Cubs, Philadelphia Phillies, and St. Louis Cardinals

=== National Basketball Association (NBA) ===
- Pete Carril, former professional and collegiate basketball coach, Sacramento Kings and Princeton University
- Aaron Gray, former professional basketball player, Chicago Bulls, New Orleans Hornets, Sacramento Kings, and Toronto Raptors
- Tyrese Martin, professional basketball player, Brooklyn Nets
- Brant Weidner, former professional basketball player, San Antonio Spurs
- Bob Weiss, former professional basketball player and head coach of four NBA teams

=== National Football League (NFL) ===
- Saquon Barkley, professional football player, Philadelphia Eagles
- Chuck Bednarik, former professional football player, Philadelphia Eagles, and 1967 Pro Football Hall of Fame member
- Keith Dorney, former professional football player, Detroit Lions
- Jahan Dotson, professional football player, Philadelphia Eagles
- Dan Koppen, former professional football player, Denver Broncos and New England Patriots
- Noel LaMontagne, former professional football player, Cleveland Browns
- Jonathan Linton, former professional football player, Buffalo Bills
- Ed McCaffrey, former professional football player, Denver Broncos, New York Giants, and San Francisco 49ers
- Joe Milinichik, former professional football player, Detroit Lions, Los Angeles Rams, and San Diego Chargers
- Matt Millen, former professional football player, Oakland Raiders, San Francisco 49ers, and Washington Redskins, former president and general manager, Detroit Lions, and broadcaster on NFL on Fox
- Andre Reed, former professional football player, Buffalo Bills and Washington Redskins, and 2014 Pro Football Hall of Fame inductee
- Larry Seiple, former professional football player, Miami Dolphins
- John Spagnola, former professional football player, Green Bay Packers, Philadelphia Eagles, and Seattle Seahawks
- Tony Stewart, former professional football player, Cincinnati Bengals, Oakland Raiders, and Philadelphia Eagles
- Kevin White, former professional football player, Chicago Bears, New Orleans Saints, and San Francisco 49ers
- Kyzir White, professional football player, San Francisco 49ers
- Andre Williams, former professional football player, New York Giants
- Joe Wolf, former professional football player, Arizona Cardinals
- Walt Zirinsky, former professional football player who won the 1945 national championship with the Cleveland Rams

=== Olympic athletes ===
- Joe Kovacs, silver medalist, shot put, 2016 Summer Olympics and 2020 Summer Olympics
- Thomas Litz, former figure skater, 1964 Winter Olympics
- Kristen Maloney, former gymnastics medalist, 2000 Summer Olympics
- Marty Nothstein, 2000 Summer Olympics gold medal winner, track cycling
- Cheryl Van Kuren, former Olympic field hockey player
- Bobby Weaver, 1984 Summer Olympics gold medal winner, freestyle wrestling
- Cindy Werley, former 1996 Summer Olympics field hockey player

=== Professional boxing ===
- Larry Holmes, former boxing heavyweight champion who fought under nickname "The Easton Assassin"

=== Professional golf ===
- Jim Booros, former PGA Tour professional golfer

=== Professional racing ===
- Jeff Andretti, former professional race car driver
- John Andretti, former professional race car driver, NASCAR and IndyCar Series
- Mario Andretti, former professional race car driver
- Michael Andretti, professional racing team owner, former professional race car driver
- Sage Karam, professional racing driver
- Eddie Sachs, former United States Auto Club race car driver

=== Professional soccer ===
- Francesco Caruso, former professional soccer player, Harrisburg City Islanders and Otago United
- Jason Yeisley, former professional soccer player, Dallas FC

=== Professional tennis ===
- Varvara Lepchenko, professional tennis player

=== World Wrestling Entertainment (WWE) ===
- Afa Anoa'i Jr., former WWE professional wrestler known as Manu
- Billy Kidman, former professional wrestler
- Brian Knobbs, former professional wrestler
- Jerry Sags, former professional wrestler

=== Other sports ===
- Ian "Rocky" Butler, former professional football player, Canadian Football League
- George Daniel, former commissioner, National Lacrosse League
- Michelle M. Marciniak, former women's college basketball coach, South Carolina, and former professional basketball player, WNBA's Portland Fire and Seattle Storm
- Billy Packer, former CBS Sports basketball analyst
- Zach Rey, amateur wrestler who competed in the 2015 World Wrestling Championships
- Ian Riccaboni, author, host of Ring of Honor Wrestling
- Matt Riddle, professional UFC mixed martial fighter
- Dave Van Horne, former professional baseball broadcaster, Florida Marlins and Montreal Expos
- Dan Yochum, former professional football player, Montreal Alouettes and Edmonton Eskimos

== Visual arts ==
- Tal Avitzur, sculptor
- John E. Berninger, former Pennsylvania impressionist landscape painter and first Allentown Art Museum curator
- Mark Beyer, comic book artist
- Chakaia Booker, sculptor
- Karl Buesgen, former landscape painter and Pennsylvania impressionist
- Mario Dal Fabbro, furniture designer, sculptor, and author
- Don Dixon, astronomical artist
- Peter Alfred Gross, former landscape painter
- Ella Sophonisba Hergesheimer, former illustrator, painter, and printmaker
- Herman Leonard, former photographer noted for jazz portraits
- Arlington Nelson Lindenmuth, former landscape and portrait painter and photographer
- Ernie Mills, decoy maker
- Antonio Salemme, former sculptor and painter
- Grover Simcox, former illustrator
- Gary Mark Smith, street photographer
- Karl Stirner, former sculptor
- Boris Vallejo, fantasy artist
- Orlando Gray Wales, former landscape painter and Pennsylvania impressionist

== Others ==
- Stephen Barrett, psychiatrist and webmaster, Quackwatch
- Karen Bausman, architect
- Thom Browne, fashion designer
- Frank Reed Horton, founder, Alpha Phi Omega service fraternity
- Sarah Knauss, supercentenarian recognized as the "world's oldest person" by Guinness World Records from April 16, 1998, until her death on December 30, 1999, at age 119
- Harvey Miguel Robinson, serial killer
- Ryo Tokita, artist
- Charles A. Wikoff, most senior ranking U.S. Army officer killed in the Spanish–American War
