= David Mickenberg =

- Born: April 24, 1954 (age 71); Brooklyn, New York, U.S.
- Occupation(s): Museum director and author
- Title: Director of the Allentown Art Museum

David Mickenherg (born April 24, 1954, in Brooklyn, New York) is an American author, art professor and former museum director.

== Education ==
Mickenberg received his B.A. from Colgate University in Hamilton, New York, and his M.A. in art history from the University of Wisconsin-Milwaukee. Subsequently, he took courses towards a doctorate in 12th century French architecture at Indiana University in Bloomington, Indiana.

== Career ==
He became a program coordinator, lecturer and the acting director of the National Endowment for the Humanities Learning Museum Program at the Indianapolis Museum of Art. Later, he had tenures as the director of the Oklahoma City Museum of Art, the Mary and Leigh Block Museum of Art at Northwestern University in Evanston, Illinois, the Davis Museum at Wellesley College in Wellesley, Massachusetts, where he was also a professor of art at the college, and the Taubman Museum of Art in Roanoke, Virginia.

His spans as the head of various art institutions have not been without major accomplishments and/or controversies. While at the Oklahoma City Museum of Art, there were rumblings about his being hard to work under and a rash of staff resignations. At the Block Museum, he spearheaded a successful $25 million expansion and at the Taubman he worked against the tide of the local public's apathy towards contemporary art by bringing in folk art in the form of giant styrofoam sculptures by a Roanoke favorite, Mark Cline. During his time at the Davis, a Fernand Léger painting, "Woman and Child" (1921), was at first on loan for an exhibit at the Oklahoma City Museum of Art while the Davis was closed for renovations but was returned and then stored in a crate at Wellesley and disappeared. The work has not been seen since.

Mickenberg was appointed to the post of director of the Allentown Art Museum in 2013. He arrived at Allentown as the fourth director in some six years, succeeding the late J. Brooks Joyner. One of the more popular policies he instituted to achieve greater public visitation to the museum was to offer free admission for selected periods of time such as the summer season. Under his stewardship, the museum acquired from the Lehighton, Pennsylvania's American Legion post "Lehighton", a mural by Franz Kline, which the artist had created for them.

On February 24, 2020, Mickenberg stepped down after seven years as the director of the museum "to pursue other opportunities". Asked for a quote regarding his "resignation", Mickenberg said, "I'm pretty sure I resigned. I mean, yes, I resigned."

== Works ==
Mickenberg is the author of Songs of Glory: Medieval Art from 900-1500 (Oklahoma Museum of Fine Arts 1985) and Printmaking in America (co-authored with Trudy V. Hansen, Joanne Moser and Barry Walker - Harry N. Abrams 1995) He co-edited The Last Expression: Art and Auschwitz which accompanied an exhibition held at the Block Museum at Northwestern University and later traveled to the Brooklyn Museum (Block Museum 2002 - co-edited with Corrine Granof and Peter Hayes). He also wrote the introduction for The Graven Image: The Rise of Professional Printmakers in Antwerp and Haarlem, 1540-1640 (Northwestern University Press 1993).
