= Henry Bromberg =

Henry Bromberg (1878-1971) was a German-Jewish judge, art collector, and victim of Nazi persecution. His family became known for its long campaign to recover artworks looted or forcibly sold during the Nazi era, including "Lady with a Fan" by Gerard ter Borch, restituted by the National Gallery of Victoria (NGV) in 2025.

== Early life and career ==
Henry Bromberg was a judge in Hamburg, Germany. He and his wife, Hertha (Bertha) Bromberg, were part of an extended German-Jewish family connected to the Emden family, who were also prominent art collectors and philanthropists in Hamburg. Together, Henry and Bertha Bromberg built an art collection that included several Dutch and Flemish Old Masters.

== Nazi persecution and exile ==
Following the rise of the Nazi regime in the 1930s, the Brombergs, like many Jewish families, faced persecution and economic dispossession. Their art collection was subject to forced sales and confiscations as part of the systematic “Aryanisation” of Jewish assets.

The couple fled Germany in 1938, emigrating to the United States in 1939.

== Art collection and resitutions ==
In 2016 and 2018, the French Ministry of Culture returned two paintings to the Bromberg grandchildren during public ceremonies in Paris. While fleeing Nazi Germany in 1938, the Brombergs sold a 16th century painting attributed to the school of Joos van Cleve. In 2024, the Allentown Art Museum in Pennsylvania restituted a painting attributed to Cranach and his workshop, in a settlement which involved the sale of the artwork and a share of the proceeds between the family and the museum.

In October 2025, after twenty years of rejecting earlier restitution requests, the NGV announced that it had returned Lady with a Fan to the heirs of Henry and Hertha Bromberg. The Gallery stated that new evidence confirmed the painting had been owned by Dr. Henry Bromberg and was sold under duress in the late 1930s.

According to the NGV, the painting was formally deaccessioned from its collection in 2025 and returned to the Bromberg family. This was only the second Nazi-era restitution by an Australian museum, following the 2014 return of Head of a Man—also by the NGV.
