= Peter Gross =

Peter Gross may refer to:

- Peter Alfred Gross (1849–1914), American landscape painter
- Peter Gross (judge) (born 1952), British Court of Appeal judge
- Peter Gross (comics), American comic book writer and artist
- Pete Gross (1936–1992), American sports announcer
- Peter Gros, host of Wild Kingdom
- Peter Grosz, American writer and actor
