= Baum Circle =

American painter

The Baum Circle refers to the group of artists either taught by, associated with, or directly influenced by Pennsylvania impressionist painter Walter Emerson Baum. Most of these individuals lived, worked and painted in the Lehigh Valley region of eastern Pennsylvania, particularly in Lehigh and Northampton counties, and many studied under Baum, or taught, at the Baum School of Art in Allentown. In October 2006, the David E. Rodale Gallery at the Baum School of Art held an exhibition celebrating the work of this group.

Artists typically associated with the Baum Circle include:

- Eleanor Barba
- Edgar Schofield Baum (1916-2006)
- Nolan Benner, Jr.
- John E. Berninger (1897-1981)
- Karl Buesgen (1916-1981)
- Clarence Dreisbach
- Lee Everett
- Emil Gelhaar
- Richard Peter Hoffman
- Elsi Hontz
- Arlington Nelson Lindenmuth (1856-1950)
- Raphael Tod Lindenmuth (1885-1976)
- Dorothy Leonard
- Blanche Lucas
- Antonio Martino
- Giovanni Martino
- Walter Mattern (1891-1946)
- James Musselman
- Grace Whitehead Phillips
- Jerry Quier
- Ann Riley
- Melvin Stark
- Queenie Stein
- William Swallow
- Ann Yost Whitesell
- Rollin Wolf
- Sam Wolf
