= Arlington Nelson Lindenmuth =

American painter (1856–1950)

- Born: 1856; Hamburg, Pennsylvania, U.S.
- Died: 1950 (aged 93–94); Allentown, Pennsylvania, U.S.
- Education: Peter Alfred Gross
- Known for: Painting

Arlington Nelson Lindenmuth (also A.N. Lindenmuth) (1856 —1950) was an American landscape and portrait painter who lived and painted in Allentown, Pennsylvania and the Lehigh Valley region of the United States. He was a member of the Baum Circle, the group of artists either taught by, associated with, or directly influenced by Pennsylvania impressionist painter Walter Emerson Baum.

== Life ==
Lindenmuth was also one of the earliest professional photographers in the Lehigh Valley, and for many decades he owned and operated a successful photography studio, located on Sixth Street in Allentown, directly across the street from the Lyric Theatre. As early as 1882, he was also employed as a traveling sales representative for Eastman Kodak.

He studied painting under Peter Alfred Gross, who was his wife's cousin, and also in Europe. His paintings were exhibited in New York City and Philadelphia, and his murals can be seen in Allentown's Phoebe Retirement Home, Cathedral of Saint Catharine of Siena in Allentown, Pennsylvania, and Asbury Methodist Church. Lindenmuth was also a member of the Salmagundi Club.

Lindenmuth would later teach painting to students, including John E. Berninger, out of his photography studio.

In 1912, Lindenmuth also put forth a proposal for the establishment of the Allentown Art Museum. He became adept at the public promotion of the arts, both through local newspapers and his well-trafficked photography studio. His studio also served as exhibition space for local artists, including Orlando Gray Wales, who held his first exhibit there in 1912. The Fine Arts Club of the Lehigh Valley held their first exhibition in Lindenmuth's studio in 1922, and Walter Emerson Baum included his paintings in these exhibitions starting in 1923.

One of his sons, Raphael Tod Lindenmuth, also became an artist.
