= Karl Buesgen =

American painter

- Karl Buesgen, as painted by John E. Berninger.
- Born: December 25, 1916; Allentown, Pennsylvania, U.S.
- Died: December 14, 1981; Allentown, Pennsylvania, U.S.
- Education: Walter Emerson Baum; John E. Berninger
- Known for: Painting
- Movement: Pennsylvania Impressionism

Buesgen's Winter Stream sold at auction in 2005 for $2,100.

Karl Henry Buesgen, Sr. (December 25, 1916 – December 14, 1981) was an American landscape painter and Pennsylvania impressionist typically associated with the Baum Circle, a group of artists either taught by, associated with, or directly influenced by Pennsylvania impressionist painter Walter Emerson Baum.

Buesgen was born on Christmas Day, 1916 in Allentown, Lehigh County, Pennsylvania. He was the only surviving son of Joseph Herman and Katherine (née Hörth) Buesgen, both second generation German immigrants who worked in Allentown's silk and textile mills. As a young man, Buesgen studied to become a musician, and trained in piano, organ and voice. His family was involved with Allentown's Sacred Heart of Jesus Roman Catholic Church (his grandfather, Henry Buesgen, was a founding member), and he soon became a student of that church's organist and choirmaster, John Birmelin. When Birmelin retired in 1950, Buesgen was given Birmelin's post - a position he would hold for the remainder of his life. Buesgen also actively worked as a piano, organ and voice teacher in Allentown, and served as organist and choirmaster for a number of local churches.

Buesgen was a dedicated student of painting, and studied with both Walter Emerson Baum (1884–1956) and John E. Berninger (1897–1981). Like most impressionist painters, Buesgen painted landscapes en plein air (directly from nature) or from colored slides of photographs he took with his camera.

The greatest influence to Buesgen's work was John E. Berninger, his friend and teacher. For 40 years, Berninger and Buesgen spent nearly every Saturday visiting and talking, and every Sunday afternoon painting together. This relationship continued until Berninger's death in 1981. Buesgen died later that same year.

From June 2 – July 6, 2005, the Baum School of Art hosted a solo exhibition of Buesgen's paintings. In 2006, his paintings were included in a group exhibition at the Baum School highlighting the works of members of the Baum Circle.
