= Peter Alfred Gross =

American painter

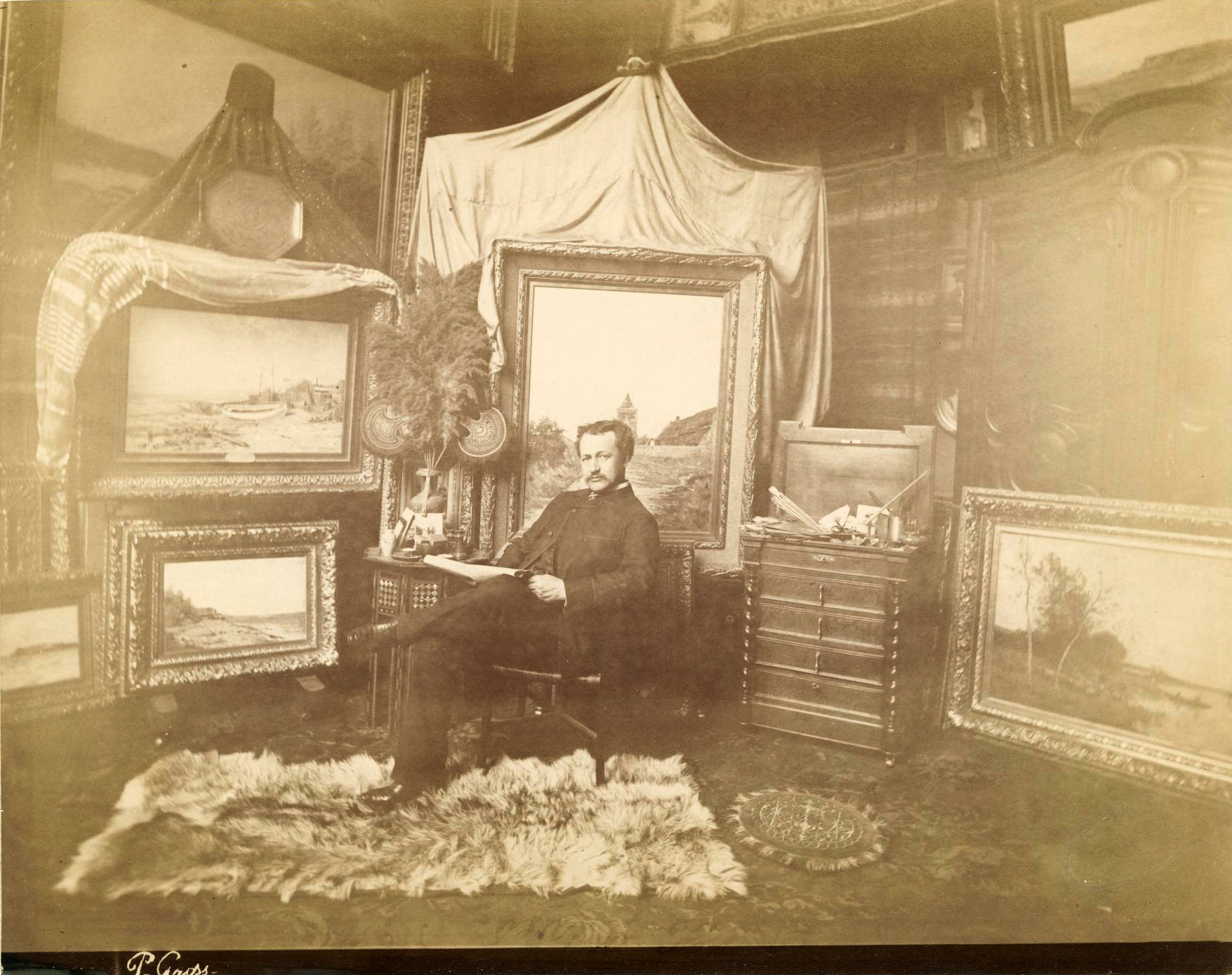
- Gross, c. 1890s
- Born: c. 1849; Allentown, Pennsylvania, U.S.
- Died: 1914; Chicago, Illinois, U.S.
- Education: Edmond Marie Petitjean
- Known for: Painting

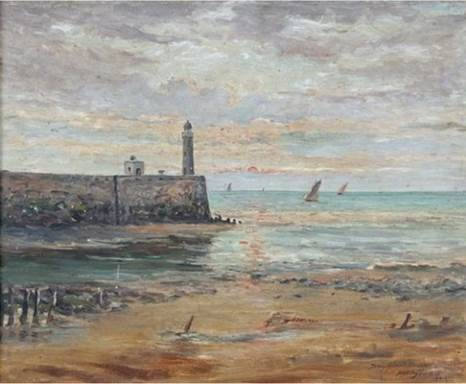
Gross's The Lighthouse, 1904

Peter Alfred Gross (c. 1849–1914) was an American landscape painter known primarily for his French seascapes and countrysides.

Gross was born in Allentown, Pennsylvania, in the Lehigh Valley region of the United States. Most of his career (1874–1914) was spent living and painting in France, where he also studied with Edmond Marie Petitjean. He exhibited at the Paris Salon and at the Pennsylvania Academy of the Fine Arts.

Notable students of Gross included Arlington Nelson Lindenmuth, who was the husband of his cousin.

== Major exhibitions ==
- Art Institute of Chicago
- Exposition Universelle (1889)
- Paris Salon
- Pennsylvania Academy of the Fine Arts
- World's Columbian Exposition

== Major collections ==
- Allentown Art Museum, Allentown, Pennsylvania, U.S.
