= Orlando Gray Wales =

American painter

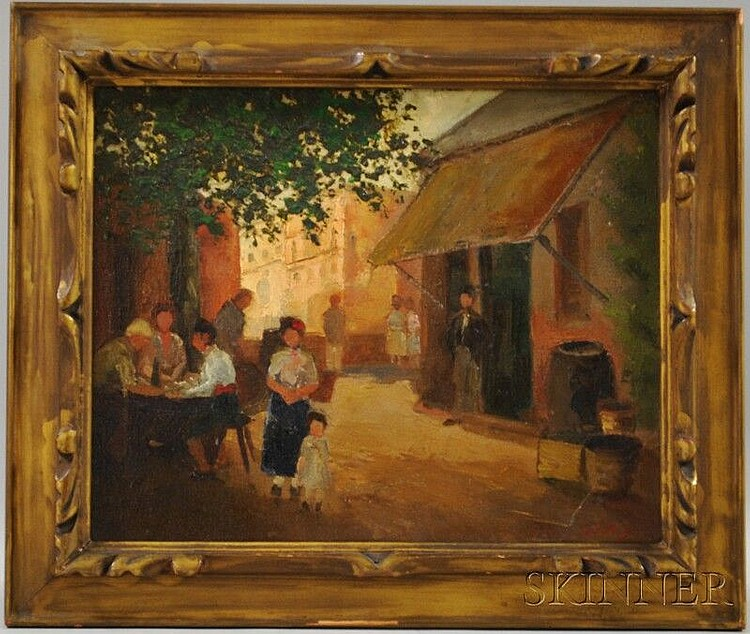
City street with figures, a portrait by Wales

Orlando Gray Wales (also O.G. Wales; 1865 – December 30, 1933) was an American landscape painter and Pennsylvania impressionist who lived and painted in Allentown and the Lehigh Valley region of eastern Pennsylvania. Wales was considered to be one of the best still-life artists of his day.

== Early life and education ==
Wales was born in Philadelphia in 1865. He studied with William Merritt Chase and Alphonse Mucha at the Pennsylvania Academy of the Fine Arts.

== Career ==
Wales first exhibited in 1912 at the studio of fellow painter and photographer Arlington Nelson Lindenmuth. His painting was one of the first 110 works acquired and exhibited by the Allentown Art Museum upon its opening in 1936.

He maintained an art studio at Tenth and Hamilton streets in Allentown.

As a teacher, his students included John E. Berninger, and Clarence I. Dresibach. Wales maintained a lifelong friendship with illustrator, painter, and printmaker Ella Sophonisba Hergesheimer, who was also raised in Allentown and also studied at the Pennsylvania Academy of Fine Arts. She was the executer of Wales estate after his death in 1933.
