= Walter Emerson Baum =

American artist and educator (1884–1956)

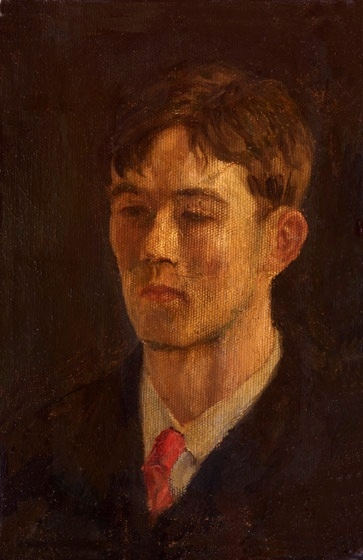
- Born: December 14, 1884; Sellersville, Pennsylvania, United States
- Died: July 12, 1956 (aged 71); United States
- Education: Pennsylvania Academy of the Fine Arts
- Occupations: Artist, educator
- Known for: Founding the Baum School of Art and the Allentown Art Museum
- Children: 4

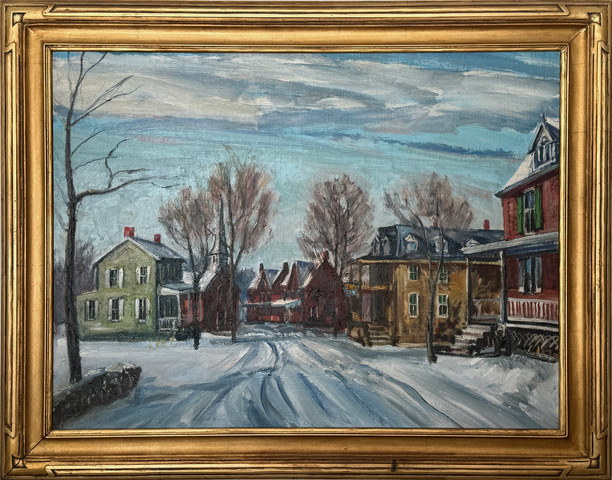
Walter E. Baum, "Richlandtown," Oil on Canvas, 30" x 40"

Walter Emerson Baum (December 14, 1884 – July 12, 1956) was an American visual artist and educator, active in the Bucks and Lehigh County areas of Pennsylvania. In addition to being a prolific painter, Baum was also responsible for the founding of the Baum School of Art, and the Allentown Art Museum.

== Early life and education ==
Walter Emerson Baum was born in Sellersville, Pennsylvania and is one of the few Pennsylvania impressionists from Bucks County, Pennsylvania. Between 1904 and 1909, Baum studied with William B. T. Trego, taking lessons at Trego's home in North Wales, Pennsylvania, about 15 miles south of his native Sellersville. Baum attended the Pennsylvania Academy of the Fine Arts in Philadelphia in 1905 and 1906, where he studied with Thomas Pollock Anshutz, Hugh H. Breckenridge, William Merritt Chase, and Cecilia Beaux.

Faced with the responsibilities of a wife and four children, Marian, Ruth, Robert and Edgar, Baum took odd jobs to support his family. He worked in the family's barbershop, and worked as a photographer for The Poultry Item, a magazine which focused on chickens, ducks, and geese. He also wrote for the Sellersville, Pennsylvania-based newspaper, the Sellersville Herald, and was appointed its editor in 1921; he wrote columns for the paper until 1942. As his paintings became better known, he taught art classes at his home in Sellersville and at the local high school.

== Career ==
Baum was an active art instructor in the Allentown area from 1926 to 1956, where his students included John E. Berninger, Karl Buesgen, Joseph Gehringer, Walter Mattern, and Melville Stark. "The Baum Circle" refers to the artists either taught by, associated with, or directly influenced by Baum. In October 2006, the David E. Rodale Gallery at the Baum School of Art in Allentown, Pennsylvania held an exhibition celebrating the work of this group.

=== Writer and illustrator ===
Baum worked as a columnist for the Sellersville Herald. In 1921, he was promoted to editor of the paper, where he worked until 1942. At the Herald, Baum wrote a weekly column in which he discussed the history, culture and ideals of his home town.

In 1938, Baum wrote Two Hundred Years (published by the Sellersville Herald, Sellersville Pennsylvania), a book documenting the history of the Pennsylvania Germans in the Sellersville area. Like his contemporaries N.C. Wyeth and Norman Rockwell, whose works graced the covers of The Saturday Evening Post for years, Baum also became involved in illustration. His first cover appeared in Curtis Publishing Company's Country Gentleman magazine in January 1931. In 1948, Baum provided illustrations and an introductory essay for the Selected Short Stories of Thomas Hardy (published by Rodale, Inc., Emmaus, Pennsylvania).

Baum also worked as an art critic and reviewer for the Philadelphia Evening and Sunday Bulletin, a position in which, as an artist himself, he was able to bring a unique perspective that became popular with readers. In this role, he was also able to promote local art and artists. During the Great Depression, a period during which artists found it extremely difficult to find work, his column was important in keeping the vibrant Philadelphia art community active and informed.

=== Allentown Art Museum ===
The Allentown Art Gallery was organized by Baum and opened in Allentown's Hunsicker School on March 17, 1934. With seventy canvases by local Pennsylvania impressionist artists on display, the gallery attracted major attention from the local and regional art communities. During the Great Depression, Baum was able to grow the collection through the Public Works of Art Project and through acquisitions and gifts. In June 1936, the City of Allentown granted the museum a permanent home in a Federal-style house located in the Rose Garden in Allentown's Cedar Park. The museum's first curator was local artist John E. Berninger, a student of Baum's, who lived with his wife on the museum's second floor.

=== Bucks County Traveling Art Gallery ===
In 1949, Walter Emerson Baum and Dr. Charles H. Boehm, Bucks County Superintendent of Schools, established the Bucks County Traveling Art Gallery, a program whose goal was to expose school children of Bucks County to the artwork of the New Hope School and the Pennsylvania Impressionist movement. The county-wide program was formally established by Boehm after positive feedback was received from parents and teachers when a Baum painting was purchased to celebrate the retirement of one of Baum's grammar school teachers.

The program was officially unveiled in a ceremony at the Bucks County Playhouse in New Hope, Pennsylvania. Notable Bucks County residents including Pearl S. Buck took part, as did many of the artists whose paintings were purchased for the gallery.

The collection, which now includes over 350 pieces of art, has visited all of the thirteen school districts in the county, and is managed by the Bucks County Intermediate Unit and maintained by the James A. Michener Art Museum. Artists represented in the collection include Baum, Walter Elmer Schofield, Sarah Blakeslee, and Harry Leith-Ross.

The Bucks County Intermediate Unit Collection is one of the most important collections of Pennsylvania Impressionist artwork outside of the Lenfest collection of the Michener Art Museum. It was the Bucks County Traveling Art Gallery that served as the impetus (albeit it took almost forty more years to come to fruition) for the establishment of a museum in Doylestown, Pennsylvania dedicated to the work of local artists.

== Personal life ==
Edgar Schofield Baum (1916–2006) was Walter Emerson Baum's eldest son. Edgar worked in a wide variety of media, including oil and acrylic painting, dyes, sculpture, and the writing of poetry and wit. He published a book of his writings, entitled Jest and Ernest: A Collection of Original Aphorisms and As-Isms.

Edgar attended the medical school at the University of Pennsylvania in Philadelphia and served as a combat medical officer in the European Theatre during World War II. At the end of the war, he returned to Allentown, Pennsylvania, and established a family practice that, for over 40 years, was located at 1624 Walnut Street, in the city's West Park neighborhood. He also served as a Baum School of Art trustee.

In October 2006, the David E. Rodale Gallery at the Baum School of Art held an exhibition celebrating the work of the Baum Circle. A memorial exhibition, celebrating Baum's life and work, was held at the Baum School during June 2007.

== Influences ==
- Robert Henri and the Ashcan School
- Thomas Eakins
- French and American impressionists
- Walter Schofield
- Edward Redfield
- Charles Rosen

== Major exhibitions ==
=== Solo ===
In January 1940, Baum presented a one-man exhibit at the Philadelphia Art Alliance gallery. Additional solo shows included:

- Walter E. Baum, A.N.A., Exhibition in Retrospect, 1923–1953, Playhouse Galleries, New Hope, Pennsylvania, 1953
- Retrospective show, Forrest Gallery, Philadelphia, Pennsylvania, 1954

=== Group ===
- Pennsylvania Academy of the Fine Arts, Philadelphia, Pennsylvania, 1914–1916,1918–1920, 1922, 1924–1926,1928–1954
- Corcoran Gallery of Art, Washington, DC, 1916, 1926, 1935, 1937, 1939, 1941, 1943, 1947, 1951
- National Academy of Design, New York, New York, 1926, 1928, 1933, 1936, 1938, 1941–1950
- Audubon Artists, New York, New York, 1953
- Art Institute of Chicago, Chicago, Illinois
- Brooklyn Museum, Brooklyn, New York City
- Baltimore Museum of Art, Baltimore, Maryland
- Detroit Institute of Art, Detroit, Michigan
- Fort Worth Museum of Art, Fort Worth, Texas
- Phillips Mill Community Association, New Hope, Pennsylvania annual art exhibitions
- Philadelphia Art Club, Philadelphia, Pennsylvania
- St. Louis Art Museum, St. Louis, Mississippi
- The Pennsylvania School of Landscape Painting: An Original American Impressionism, traveling exhibition, Allentown Museum, Corcoran Gallery of Art, Westmoreland County Museum, Brandywine River Museum, 1984–85
- Kemerer Museum, Bethlehem, Pennsylvania, 1984 The Pennsylvania Impressionists: Painters of the New Hope School, James A. Michener Arts Center, 1990
- The Lenfest Exhibition of Pennsylvania Impressionism, James A. Michener Art Museum, Doylestown, Pennsylvania, 2001 (Permanent)
- Objects of Desire: Treasures from Private Collections, James A. Michener Art Museum, New Hope, Pennsylvania, 2005–2006

== Colleagues and affiliations ==
- American Artists Professional League
- American Watercolor Society
- Allentown-Bethlehem Art Alliance
- Buck Hill Arts Association
- Germantown Art League
- Lehigh Art Alliance
- National Academy of Design, Associate Member 1945
- Associate Member, National Academy of Design Fellowship of the Pennsylvania Academy of the Fine Arts, Philadelphia, Pennsylvania, 1939
- Philadelphia Art Alliance
- Philadelphia Sketch Club
- Philadelphia Watercolor Club

== Teaching and professional appointments ==
- Art instructor, Allentown, Pennsylvania, 1926-1956
- Founder and director, Baum School of Art (formerly Kline-Baum School), Allentown, Pennsylvania, 1928
- Associate academian, National Academy of Design, 1944
- Founder, Allentown Art Museum, 1939

== Awards ==
- Bronze Medal, American Artist's Exhibition, Philadelphia, 1918
- Jennie Sesnan Gold Medal, Pennsylvania Academy of the Fine Arts, Philadelphia, 1925
- Prize, Springville, Utah, 1932
- Prize, Pennsylvania Academy of the Fine Arts, Philadelphia, 1939
- Prize, American Society of Miniature Painters, New York City, 1943
- Medal, Philadelphia Watercolor Club, Philadelphia, 1944
- Prize, American Watercolor Society, 1945
- Prize, Buck Hill Art Association, Pennsylvania, 1945
- Doctor of Humane Letters (honorary), Lehigh University, Bethlehem, Pennsylvania, 1946
- M. Grumbacher Purchase Prize for Casein, Audubon Artists, 1953
- Medal of Honor, National Arts Club, 1953
- Gold Medal Award, daVinci Alliance, Philadelphia, 1956 (awarded posthumously)

== Collections ==
- Philadelphia Museum of Art, Philadelphia, Pennsylvania
- Toledo Art Museum, Toledo, Ohio
- Lehigh University Art Galleries, Bethlehem, Pennsylvania
- National Academy of Design, New York City, New York
- Pennsylvania Academy of the Fine Arts, Philadelphia, Pennsylvania

== See also ==
- Baum Circle
- Baum School of Art

== Resources ==
Folk, Thomas. The Pennsylvania Impressionists, with a foreword by James A. Michener (Doylestown and London: James Michener Museum and Associated University Presses, 1997).

- Hutson-Saxton, Martha Young (1996). Walter Emerson Baum, 1884-1956: Pennsylvania artist and founder of the Baum School of Art and Allentown Art Museum. s.l.: The Author. ASIN B001UT4XL2.
- Peterson, Brian H., ed. (2002). Pennsylvania Impressionism. Philadelphia: James A. Michener Art Museum and University of Pennsylvania Press. ISBN 0-8122-3700-5.
