= Lehighton (Franz Kline) =

Mural by Franz Kline

Lehighton is a mural by the American painter Franz Kline.

In 1946, the Lehighton, Pennsylvania Post of the American Legion commissioned Kline to do a large canvas depicting the town where he had attended high school. The painting features many of Lehighton's landmarks.

The mural was acquired from the American Legion in 2016 by the Allentown Art Museum in Allentown, Pennsylvania. Over the years, the mural had suffered damage from cigarette smoke. It was restored by Luca Bonetti Painting Restoration, and unveiled to the public in January 2017. It is now on permanent exhibition at the museum.
