= Baum School of Art =

Art school in Allentown, Pennsylvania

Coordinates: 40.6044°N 75.4689°W

The Baum School of Art

Location
- 510 W. Linden Street; Allentown, Pennsylvania 18105; United States

Information
- Opened: 1926
- Chairperson: Ann Lalik
- Staff: 13
- Faculty: 30
- Communities served: Lehigh Valley
- Executive Director: Shannon Slattery Fugate
- Assistant Director: Laurie Siegfried
- Director of Exhibitions and Collections: Rudy S. Ackerman, Ed.D.
- Website: http://www.baumschool.org

The Baum School of Art is a non-profit community art school located in Allentown, Pennsylvania.

In 2016–2017, the school had a total enrollment of 3,346 students, 1,921 of which were children and teens, and 1,425 of which were adults. 178 classes were offered for children and teens, and 168 for adult students.

== History ==
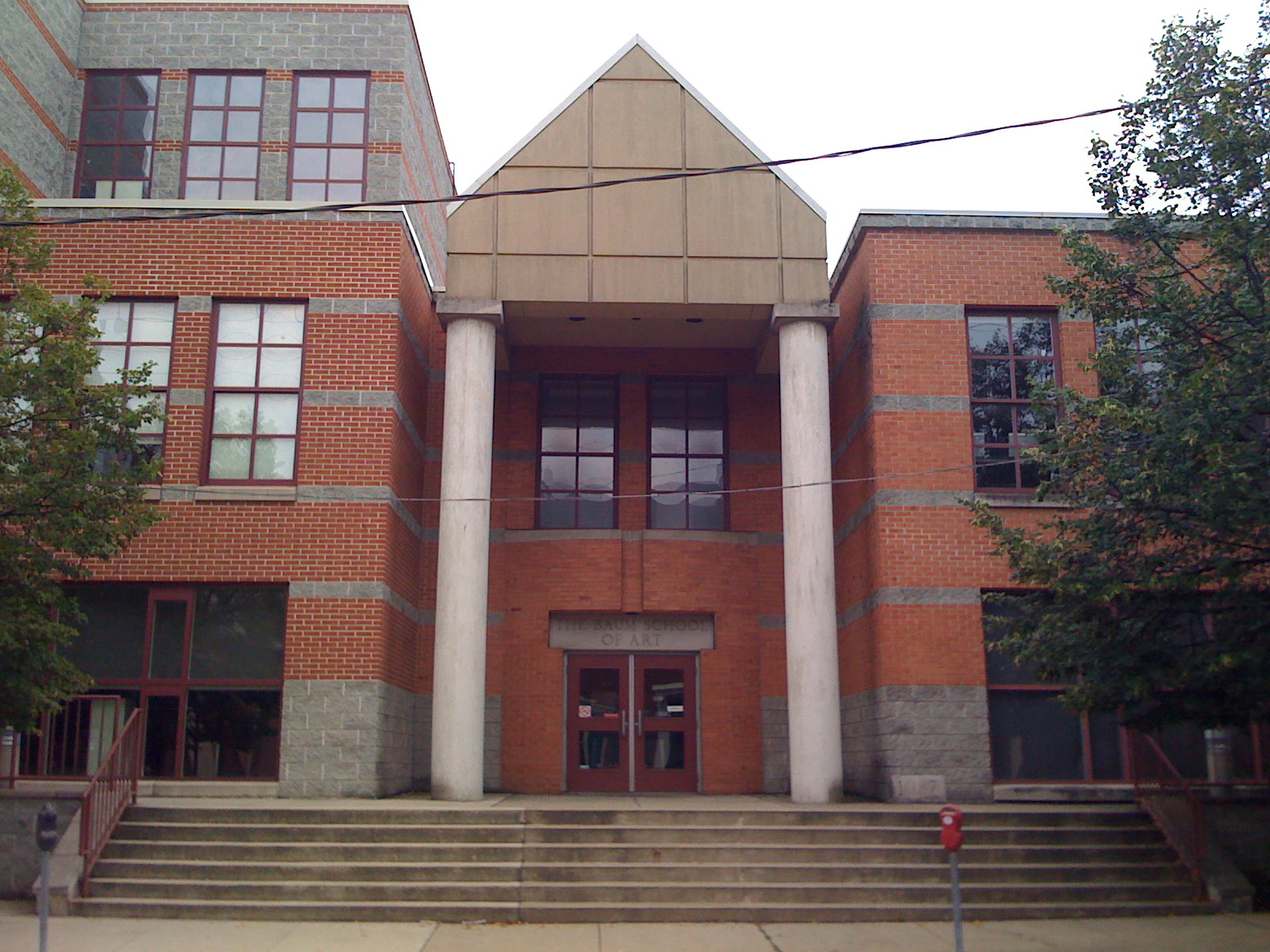
Baum School of Art in July 2008

The school was established in the summer of 1926, when artist Walter Emerson Baum was recruited by Blanche Lucas to provide art instruction to art teachers of the Allentown School District. Feedback was so positive that Baum was asked to return repeatedly, and classes became known as "The Baum School."

=== Circulating picture club ===
Originally established in 1933 by Walter Emerson Baum, the Circulating Picture Club provides paintings for subscribers including banks, professional and business offices, government offices, and educational institutions. The Circulating Picture Club has over 586 pictures in circulation by artists, including Baum, John E. Berninger, and others.

== Historical locations ==
| Dates | Location |
|---|---|
| 1926 to December, 1928 | Franklin Fire Hall, 14th and Turner Streets |
| January 1929 to August 1935 | Hunsicker School, North 6th Street (above Chew Street) |
| August 1935 to August 1939 | Sheridan School, 2nd and Liberty Streets |
| August 1939 to August 1946 | Lincoln School, 14th and Walnut Streets |
| August 1946 to 1952 | Jackson School, 517 N. 15th Street |
| 1952–1976 | Moved to own building at 12th and Walnut Streets; Name changed to Baum School of Art |
| 1976 | Moved to annex of Allentown Art Museum |
| 1987 | Moved to own building on Linden Street (present location) |

== See also ==
- List of historic places in Allentown, Pennsylvania
