= Melissa VanFleet =

American singer-songwriter

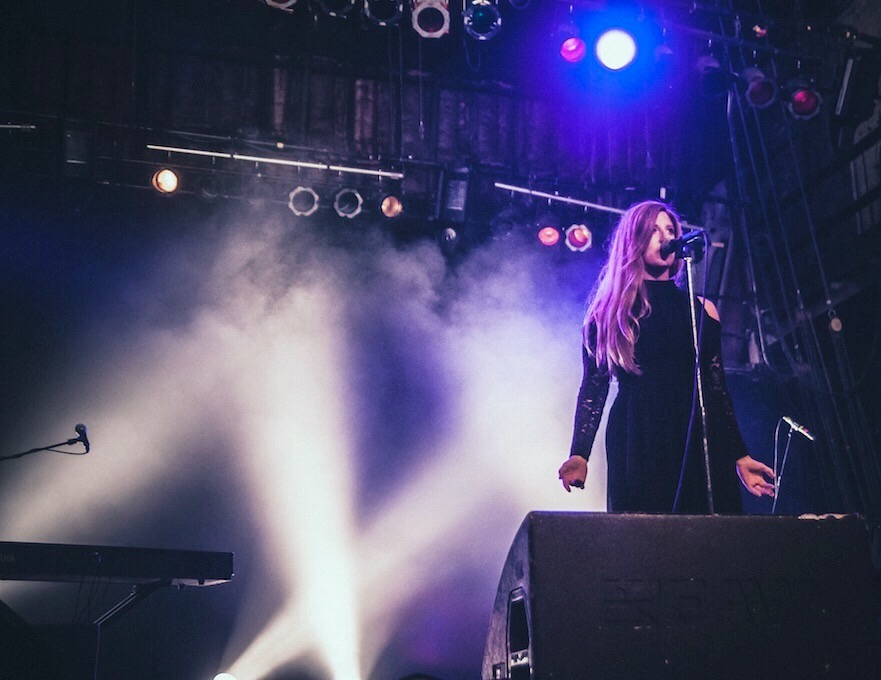
- VanFleet performing in September 2014

Background information
- Born: Melissa Ann VanFleet; 1986 (age 39–40); Bethlehem, Pennsylvania, U.S.
- Genres: Alternative metal; gothic metal
- Occupations: Singer; songwriter; pianist
- Instruments: Vocals; piano; guitar
- Years active: 2012–present
- Website: www.melissavanfleet.com/about

Melissa Ann VanFleet (born 1986) is an American singer-songwriter and musician from Bethlehem, Pennsylvania. In 2012, her piano covers of American heavy metal band W.A.S.P.'s ballad "Sleeping (In the Fire)" and "Too Late" by Black Sabbath garnered attention from the heavy metal music community. VanFleet has since collaborated with Scott Rockenfield of Queensrÿche, Nick Douglas of DORO, Doug Blair of W.A.S.P., Italian symphonic death metal band Genus Ordinis Dei, and Cristina Scabbia of Lacuna Coil.

== Early life ==
VanFleet was born in Bethlehem, Pennsylvania, in 1986. As a child, she would perform the national anthem in local stadiums, and completed her first demo at age 12. She also wrote poetry and lyrics as a form of therapy to help deal with complications of having a parent with a chronic illness. She taught herself to play guitar after discovering her father's acoustic and electric guitars and chord books.

VanFleet has said, "My grandparents bought me a karaoke machine, and I would sing for hours from the time I was 7 years old. I’d circle notes where I was flat and sharp, which my dad taught me to listen for when I sang. I had no formal training, but I learned through my father." VanFleet has also discussed how some of her earliest memories include her father "rocking me to sleep to Ozzy’s "Shot In The Dark," and how "whenever I would cry, Metal music was the only thing that would make me fall asleep. Like, you can put on Sesame Street, it would do nothing. But the minute that I heard, you know, the heavy guitars and everything, I would just knock out just like that. So yeah, it’s really interesting. But yeah, so he definitely pulled me into that world and, and I’ve never left so I’m very, very grateful for that." VanFleet said she "was influenced by strong female artists with unique vocals, including Alanis Morissette, Fiona Apple, and Tracy Chapman," and Tori Amos.

VanFleet is a trained dancer. She has said that being a ballerina instilled in her an appreciation for classical music and cites "darker Classical music", especially Pyotr Ilyich Tchaikovsky's Swan Lake as a major influence.

== Career ==
In 2012, VanFleet recorded a piano cover version of American heavy metal band W.A.S.P.'s ballad "Sleeping (In The Fire)" and posted it to YouTube, which along with her cover of "Too Late” by Black Sabbath, garnered attention from the heavy metal music community. VanFleet characterized it as an homage to Ronnie James Dio, who she considers an inspiration.

In 2013, VanFleet released her debut EP, Stars in Her Eyes, described in a review by nightMair Creative as, "This may be Melissa’s debut album, but this is no ‘beginner’ offering. The fabulous writing is matched by equally fabulous melodies and solid production to make this album a joy to listen to. Over and over." production of Stars in My Eyes took a year and a half. VanFleet has pledged a portion of the proceeds from Stars In My Eyes will go to National Coalition Against Domestic Violence

She worked with New Jersey and New York City producers, and moved to Nashville, Tennessee for four years, where she honed her songwriting skills and style. She frequently performed at Bluebird Café and Ellendale’s, Coq d’Or at Chicago's Drake Hotel, and New York City's oldest rock club, The Bitter End.

In April 2015, VanFleet went on tour in Europe. She performed in Barcelona. She also performed on the Full Metal Cruise II, presented by German music promoter Wacken, which included Blaze Bayley, Doro, HammerFall, and Axxis.

Her acoustic LP Metal Lullabies, released on August 19, 2015, included seven metal covers as well as original songs. The album "is beautifully done and features delicate, piano-anchored covers of the likes of Black Sabbath, Twisted Sister, W.A.S.P., Queensrÿche, System of a Down, Lacuna Coil, and more."

In 2016, VanFleet told Ultimate Guitar she was collaborating on a project with Scott Rockenfield of Queensrÿche and Nick Douglas of DORO. Scott Rock told Ultimate Guitar, "Melissa is exceptionally talented and has a great fan base! I am looking forward to working with her soon and seeing what we can develop together!" VanFleet says the song came from her own "dark mental place." She attributes the title track's creation to her experiences "while on the Wacken Full Metal Cruise II. I was inspired by stories I heard from fans aboard the ship about how metal was more than music to them and instead it was who they were." etherealmetalwebzine rates the EP at 5 stars out of 5.

In May 2016, Doug Blair announced an upcoming collaboration with American alternative metal vocalist and musician Melissa VanFleet. In October 2017, VanFleet released "Raven," a single featuring Blair on lead guitar.

In February 2017, VanFleet recorded at BRX Studio in Milan, Italy, with the team behind Italian gothic metal band Lacuna Coil's 2016 album Delirium – producer/bassist Marco Coti Zelati with engineers Marco Barusso, Dario Valentini and Marco D'Agostino – and her debut single "Raven," featuring Doug Blair of |W.A.S.P. on lead guitar, was released on October 13, 2017. VanFleet recorded a live piano version of "Raven" as part of an exclusive for Rock Rebel Magazine in March 2018.

In February 2018, VanFleet discussed plans for a forthcoming EP during an interview on the Emptyspiral podcast. VanFleet released the EP Ode To The Dark to critical acclaim on October 13, 2018. Ode To The Dark was named one of the 31 Best Albums of 2018 by I'm Music Magazine, which stated, "VanFleet has steadily been building a fanbase with her dark, brooding piano interpretations of classics from such legends as W.A.S.P. and Black Sabbath."

In May 2019, VanFleet was featured as a guest vocalist on a song titled "Nemesis" by Italian symphonic death metal band Genus Ordinis Dei. The single was released via Eclipse Records on May 24, 2019 and the music video debuted on May 28, 2019. Nick Key of Genus Ordinis Dei described working with VanFleet as an "absolute pleasure," stating, "The contrast between our voices create a very deep atmosphere and it feels great... she’s perfect for it!"

In July 2019, VanFleet accompanied Cristina Scabbia of Lacuna Coil on an electric piano towards the end of two sold out shows at the Gramercy Theatre in New York, and "reinterpreted" Lacuna Coil songs. When asked about VanFleet's involvement during an interview with hardDrive Radio, Scabbia said, "It all started because Marco, our bass player, produced her record and that's when we met her in Milano. When we thought about a piano version of the songs and an acoustic part of the 119 Shows in New York, we immediately thought about her. We asked her and she was super excited because she has been a Lacuna Coil fan and we had a great time."

She has shared the stage with the Glenn Miller Orchestra. She plays by ear.

== Reception ==
VanFleet's music has been described by Femmetal Online as "very unique," in a review stating that her "Alternative Metal sound is mixed with orchestral elements, with a melancholic mood that digs into the deepest places in your soul." Guitar Girl Magazine said her performance features an "emotionally intense signature vocal delivery and powerful songwriting ability." Her work has been described by Cryptic Rock as "a fine art lullaby formulated with the spark of the fiercest Metalhead!" She "specialises in crafting atmospheric alternative metal songs which naturally gravitate lyrically towards dark themes and topics, led by an emotionally intense vocal delivery, which has led to favorable comparisons to the likes of Adele, Alanis Morissette, and Amy Lee of Evanescence." Metal Goddesses wrote, "Melissa VanFleet is an alternative metal vocalist and songwriter crafting dark songs with haunting melodies and intense messages. She has powerfully and effectively established her own unique sound by presenting her signature vocal prowess at the forefront while incorporating her classical and orchestral influences with heavy, melancholic undertones." Her range and repertoire seems to be ever-expanding.

In August 2012, Chicago’s Modern Luxury magazine dubbed her a “stellar chanteuse.” Her acoustic piano songs have garnered airplay in the United Kingdom, and she is an artist.

In connection with an appearance at Hard Rock Cafe Barcelona Plaça de Catalunya, a Spanish weekly in April 2015 described her as having "a prodigious voice, she is also a song-writer, multi-instrumentalist and experienced dancer. With influences that go from classic music to rock-metal, Melissa is known for her beautiful voice, catchy melodies and soulful lyrics."

== Discography ==
- Stars in My Eyes (2013)
- Ode to the Dark (2018)

=== Singles ===
- "Raven" (2017)

=== Acoustic albums ===
- Metal Lullabies (2015)

=== As featured artist ===
- "Nemesis" - Genus Ordinis Dei (2019)
