= Edmond Marie Petitjean =

French painter (1844–1925)

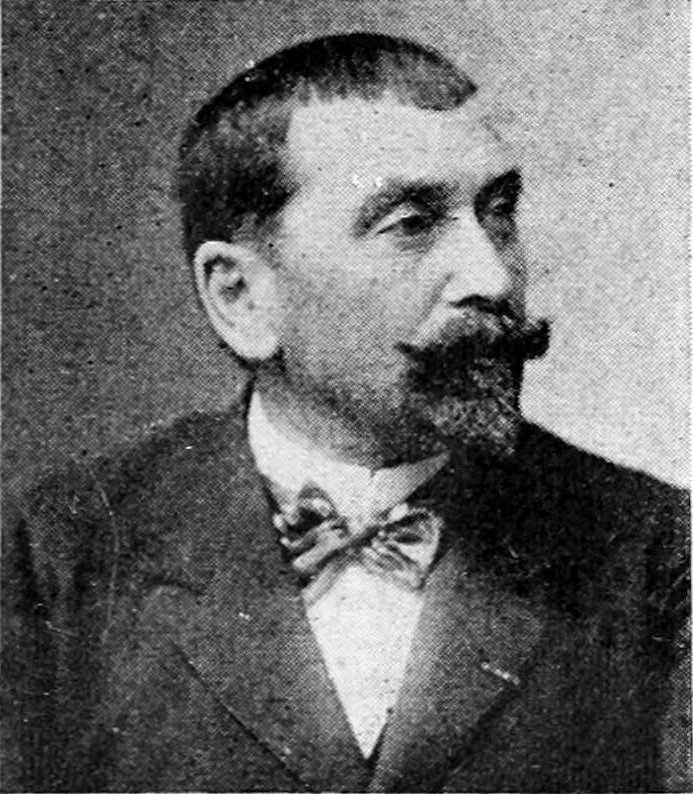
Edmond Marie Petitjean; photograph by Pierre Petit (1880s?)

Edmond Marie Petitjean (5 July 1844, Neufchâteau – 7 August 1925, Paris) was a self-taught French painter; known for landscapes and seascapes.

== Biography ==
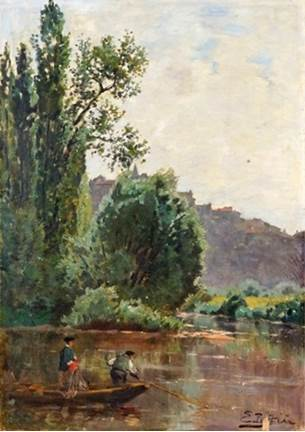
Fishermen on the Meuse

His father was a lawyer and wanted him to follow suit; forcing him to study law despite his artistic talent and sending him to Paris, where he was apprenticed to a notary. While there, he visited the museums and became determined to be an artist. His parents cut off his financial support, but he was able to find employment managing a small factory in Nancy. This enabled him to purchase the painting supplies he needed.

In 1874, he held his first solo exhibit at the Salon des Artistes Français. He was awarded honorable mention at the Salon of 1881 and, two years later, became a member. This was followed by a First Class medal in 1884 and a Second Class medal in 1885.

He painted in several ports along the Atlantic coast and spent a year working in Dordrecht. He participated in decorating several pavilions at the Exposition Universelle (1889) and was presented with a silver medal. The following year, he exhibited in Munich. In 1892, he was named a Knight in the Legion of Honor.

In 1900, he and twenty other painters received a commission from Stéphane Adolphe Dervillé, president of the board of directors of the Chemins de fer de Paris à Lyon et à la Méditerranée, to decorate the restaurant in the Gare de Lyon now known as "Le Train Bleu". He was assigned to work in the "Salle dorée" (Golden Room), themed to represent the Mediterranean coast, and painted a scene depicting the village of Le Puy. His study for the painting received a gold medal at the Exposition Universelle (1900).

In 1904, he married Jeanne Lauvernay, also a painter, who was thirty-one years his junior. Until the beginning of World War I, he exhibited internationally and was awarded a silver medal at the Alaska-Yukon-Pacific Exposition in 1909. Overall, he is believed to have created almost 800 paintings.

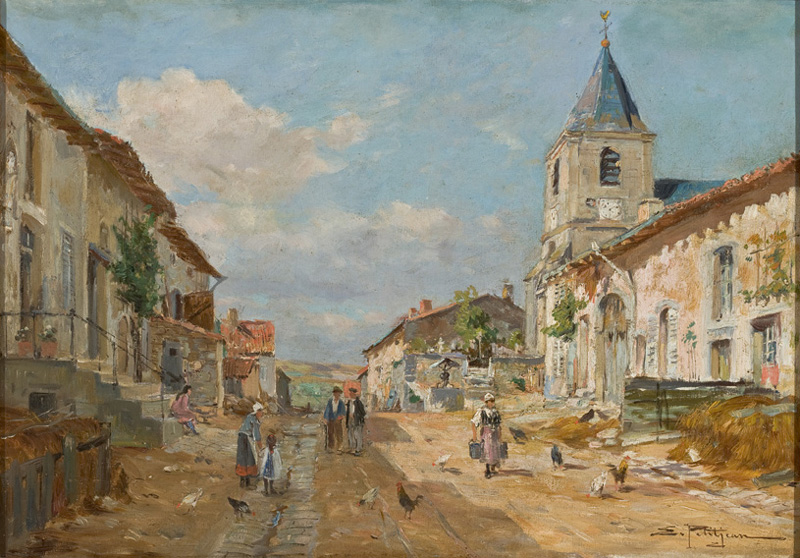
Village Street

As did many artists during the period, he also provided illustrations and cartoons for periodicals; notably the satirical journals, Le Frou-frou, L'Assiette au Beurre and Le Rire.
