= John E. Berninger =

American painter

- Berninger's self-portrait
- Born: December 13, 1896
- Died: July 16, 1981; Allentown, Pennsylvania, U.S.
- Education: Orlando Gray Wales, Arlington Nelson Lindenmuth, Walter Emerson Baum
- Known for: Painting
- Movement: Pennsylvania Impressionism

John Emil Berninger (December 13, 1896 – July 16, 1981) was an American landscape painter and Pennsylvania impressionist. He lived and painted in Allentown, Pennsylvania.

== Early life and education ==
Berninger was born in Allentown, Pennsylvania, on December 13, 1896. As an artist, Berninger has been described as being "in the outer ring of the New Hope School and a member of the Baum Circle, the group of artists either taught by, associated with, or directly influenced by Pennsylvania impressionist painter Walter Emerson Baum.

Berninger studied under Orlando Gray Wales and Arlington Nelson Lindenmuth, and was a student of Baum's first class in Allentown during the summer of 1926.

== Career ==
In 1932, he became an art instructor at the Kline-Baum Art School. In 1934, he was one of four Baum students along with Joseph Gehringer, Walter Mattern and Melville Stark who accepted into the Circulating Picture Club of the Philadelphia Art Alliance.

In 1936, Berninger became the first curator of the Allentown Art Museum, founded by Baum the previous year, and lived with his wife, Mabel, on the museum's second floor until 1956. Mabel Berninger assisted her husband in his role as curator at the museum, and also served as secretary for the Kline-Baum School's Circulating Picture Club, a "lending library" for art.

In 1939, Berninger was made a partner in Wuchter and Berninger, a jewelry store located on Hamilton Street in Center City Allentown. To promote his works, Berninger would often place them in the window of his store. It was here that local publisher and humanitarian Robert Rodale of Rodale, Inc. in Emmaus, Pennsylvania became exposed to Berninger's works. Many years later, the David E. Rodale Gallery at the Baum School of Art, named for Rodale's son, held the first major exhibition of Berninger's work.

In the mid-1950s, Berninger's work appeared on a series of calendars issued by the local newspaper, The Morning Call. During this time he frequently vacationed in Bar Harbor, Maine, an area which became the subject of many of his seascape paintings. In the late 1950s and early 1960s, his home - located across the street from Allentown's picturesque West Park (near the intersection of 15th and Turner Streets) - became a frequent meeting place for local artists.

For forty years, Berninger painted with Karl Buesgen, a local impressionist landscape artist, music teacher and church organist. The two spent nearly every Saturday visiting and talking, and every Sunday afternoon painting. This relationship continued until Berninger's death in 1981. Buesgen died later that same year. Berninger also painted on a regular basis with Baum, Melville Stark, and Clarence Dreisbach.

In 2004, the David E. Rodale Gallery at the Baum School of Art held an exhibition of the Berninger's work. During 2004 and 2005, Berninger's work was included in the Allentown Art Museum's exhibit, "Allentown Impressions: Views of City Parks." In 2006, Berninger's work was included in an exhibition at the David E. Rodale Gallery at the Baum School of Art highlighting the work of The Baum Circle.
