= Leave the Light On (memoir) =

2010 book by Jennifer Storm

- First US edition cover
- Author: Jennifer Storm
- Language: English
- Genre: Memoir/Recovery
- Publisher: Central Recovery Press
- Publication date: 2010
- Publication place: United States
- Media type: Print
- Pages: 235
- ISBN: 978-0-9818482-2-8
- Preceded by: Blackout Girl: Growing Up and Drying Out in America

Leave the Light On is the second memoir written by Jennifer Storm. The book deals with Storm's recovery from drug and alcohol addiction and her experiences coming out of the closet about it. The book is the companion to Blackout Girl: Growing Up and Drying Out in America. It has been called "fearlessly honest" and "courageous" by We Magazine for Women.
