= Jennifer Storm =

American writer and Victim Witness Advocate of Pennsylvania

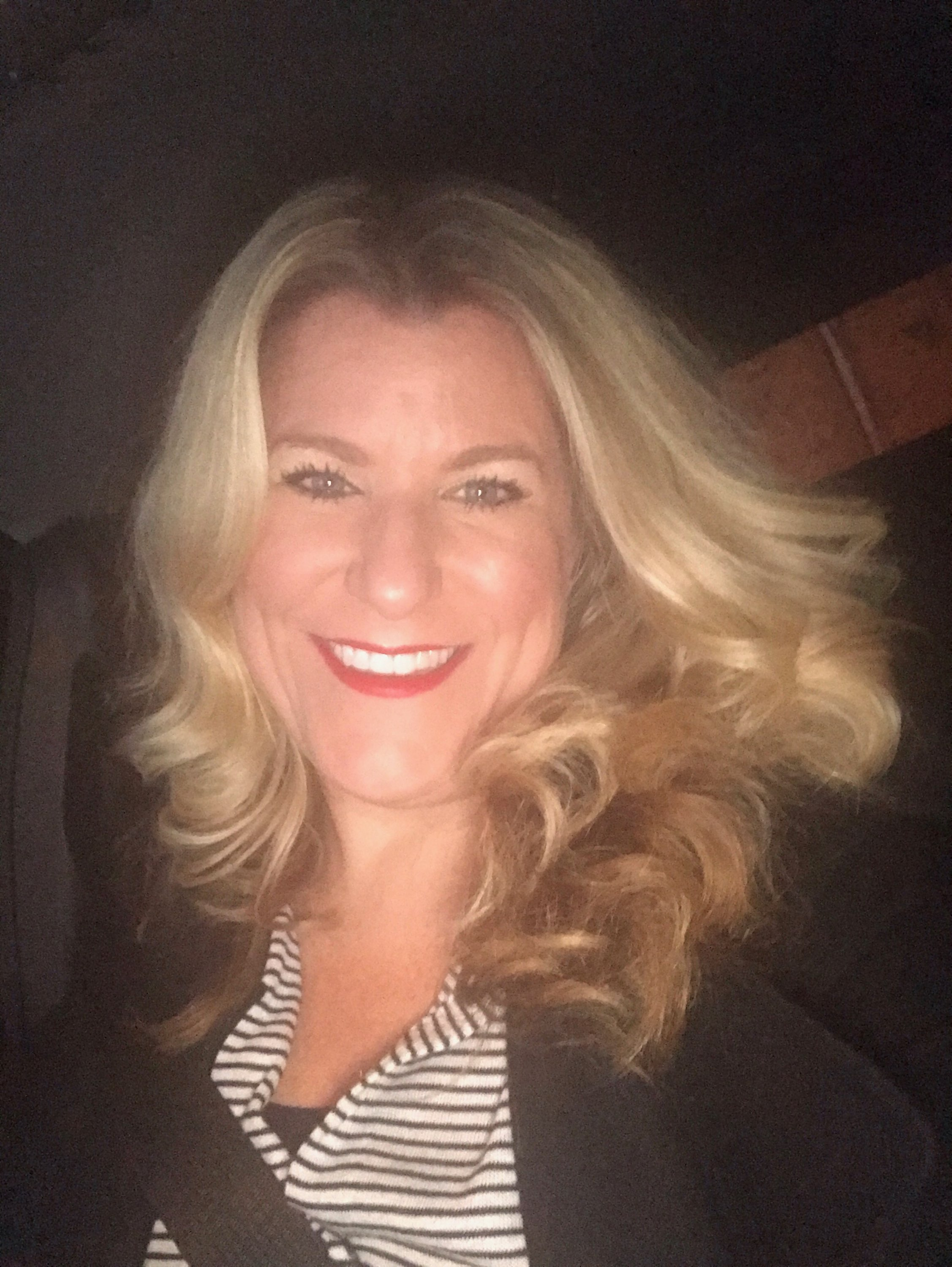
- Storm in 2017
- Born: May 7, 1975 (age 51); Lehigh County, Pennsylvania, U.S.
- Education: Pennsylvania State University (BS); University of Phoenix (MA)
- Occupations: Advocate; Author; Television Personality; Motivational Speaker
- Writing career
- Notable work: Blackout Girl
- Website: jenniferstorm.com

Jennifer Storm (born May 7, 1975) is a victims' rights expert and author who has written about alcohol and drug addiction and recovery. She is the former victim advocate of the Commonwealth of Pennsylvania, who served after being appointed by Governor Tom Corbett in 2013. She was unanimously confirmed by the Pennsylvania State Senate and sworn in for a six-year term on December 20, 2013.

Storm has documented her struggles with addiction in several books, including a second edition of Blackout Girl: Tracing My Scars from Addiction and Sexual Assault: With New and Updated Content for the #Metoo Era, Awakening Blackout Girl: A Survivors Guide for Healing from Addiction and Sexual Trauma, which recently appeared in Marie Claire magazine, along with past publications Blackout Girl: Growing Up and Drying Out in America, Leave the Light On, and Picking Up the Pieces Without Picking Up. Storm began drinking at the age of 12 and became an alcoholic by the time she was 15.

Storm is internationally known, having appeared on various national talk shows, radio programs, newspapers and magazine articles including The Today Show, World News Tonight with Diane Sawyer, People magazine, and Good Day LA.

Storm frequently writes for publications such as Parenting, The Fix, Elephant Journal, Healthy Women and more as an expert on sexual assault, substance use disorder, and trauma recovery. She has appeared in more than a dozen podcasts.

She participated in the first ever Tedx Talk inside a female state prison, at State Correctional Institution – Muncy in Muncy, Pennsylvania, where she shared her harrowing story of addiction and recovery

== Early life and education ==
Storm was born and raised near Allentown, Pennsylvania and attended Northampton Area High School in Northampton, Pennsylvania. She graduated from Penn State University with a BS in rehabilitation services and a master's degree in organizational management from the University of Phoenix.

== Office of Victim Advocate ==
During her time as Pennsylvania's Victim Advocate, Storm discussed several high profile cases, including:

=== Jerry Sandusky trial ===
Storm served as a victim advocate during the Jerry Sandusky case.

=== Bill Cosby trial ===
Storm was regularly interviewed by the press during the Cosby Trial, advocating for Bill Cosby's accusers. When the initial trial ended in a mistrial, Storm spoke out regarding the problematic role of unfamiliar language in sexual assault cases.

After the verdict's announcement, Storm commended the Montgomery County District Attorney's office for their diligent work during both trials.

When some of Cosby's accusers were denied the opportunity to speak in court, Storm held a press conference for the women, allowing them to publicly share their stories.

=== Pennsylvania Catholic Church scandal ===
In 2018, Storm advocated for victims of Pennsylvania's Catholic Church sexual abuse scandal in Harrisburg, Pa. She voiced criticism when the Church attempted to limit the statute of limitations for victims.

== Memoir series ==
=== Blackout Girl: Growing Up and Drying Out in America ===
Storm's first book, Blackout Girl: Growing Up and Drying Out in America, was published in 2008 by Hazelden. The book discusses alcohol and sexual abuse in the LGBT community. The memoir was voted one of the best top forty adult non-fiction books published in 2008 by the Pennsylvanian School Librarians Association.

=== Leave the Light On ===
Leave the Light On is the second memoir written by Jennifer Storm. The book deals with Storm's recovery from drug and alcohol addiction and her experiences coming out of the closet. The book is the companion to Blackout Girl: Growing Up and Drying Out in America. It has been called "fearlessly honest" and "courageous" by We Magazine for Women.

=== Picking up the Pieces Without Picking Up ===
Storm's third book, Picking up the Pieces Without Picking Up was a guidebook that focused on reestablishing a healthy lifestyle in the aftermath of a crime or trauma, while preventing relapse and promoting healing. The book promoted guided exercises, journaling, other proactive tools to readers. Victim Advocate and author Kim Goldman, sister of slain waiter Ron Goldman, praised the book as insightful.

=== Blackout Girl: Tracing My Scars from Addiction and Sexual Assault ===
Storm's fourth book, Blackout Girl: Blackout Girl: Tracing My Scars from Addiction and Sexual Assault; With New and Updated Content for the #MeToo Era, was published in 2020 by Hazelden. The book discusses alcohol and sexual abuse and is a second printing of her first memoir

=== Awakening Blackout Girl: A Survivor's Guide for Healing from Addiction and Sexual Trauma ===
Storm's fifth book, Awakening Blackout Girl: A Survivor's Guide for Healing from Addiction and Sexual Trauma, was published in 2020 by Hazelden. Rape survivor and victim advocate Jennifer Storm shares the information, tools, and resources she has gained from twenty years of personal and professional experience to help fellow survivors recover from co-occurring sexual trauma and substance use

== Documentary ==
A documentary based on Blackout Girl is currently in production, produced and directed by Emmy Award–winning director Sylvia Caminer.
