= Allentown Art Museum =

Art museum in Allentown, Pennsylvania

Coordinates: 40.6043°N 75.4680°W

Allentown Art Museum of the Lehigh Valley
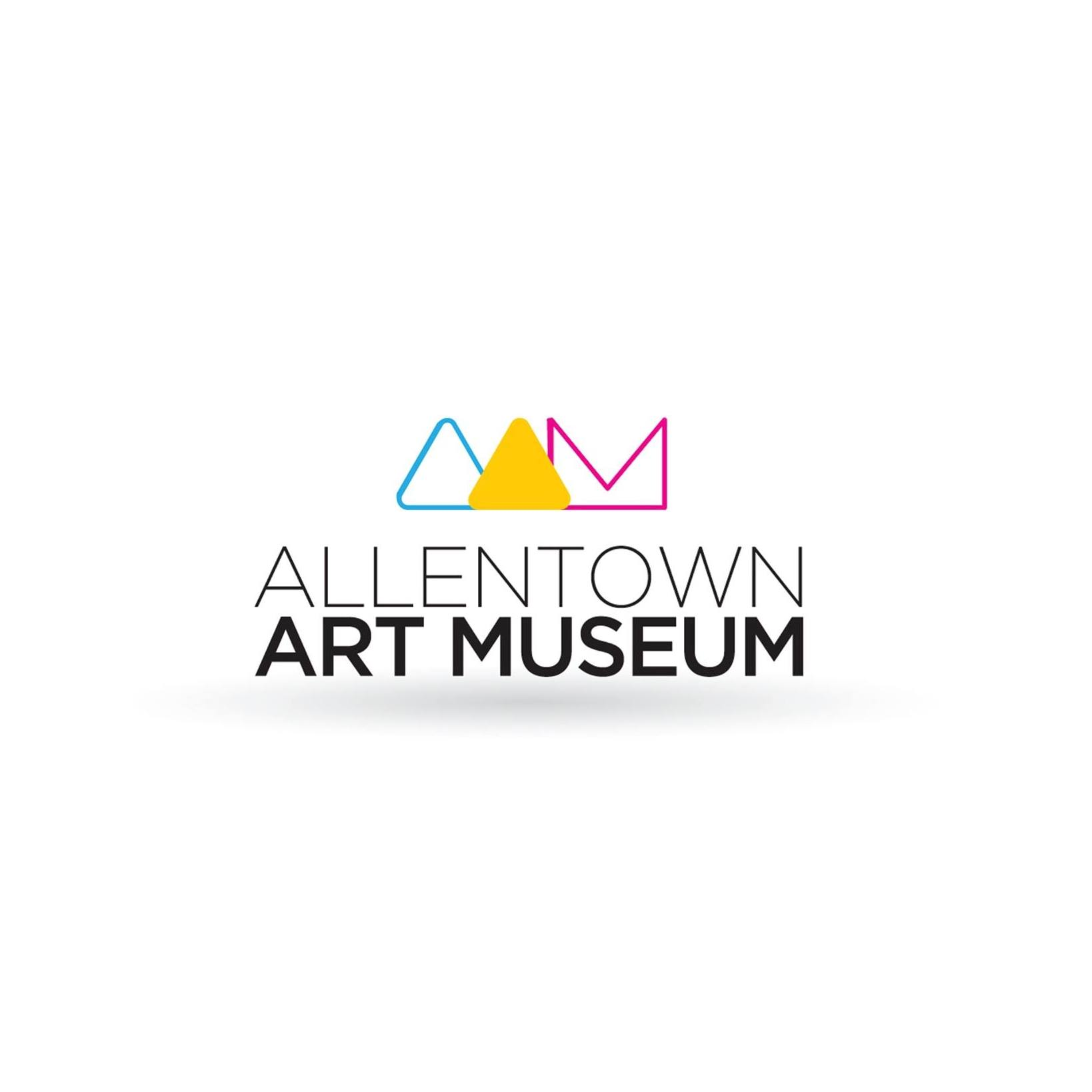

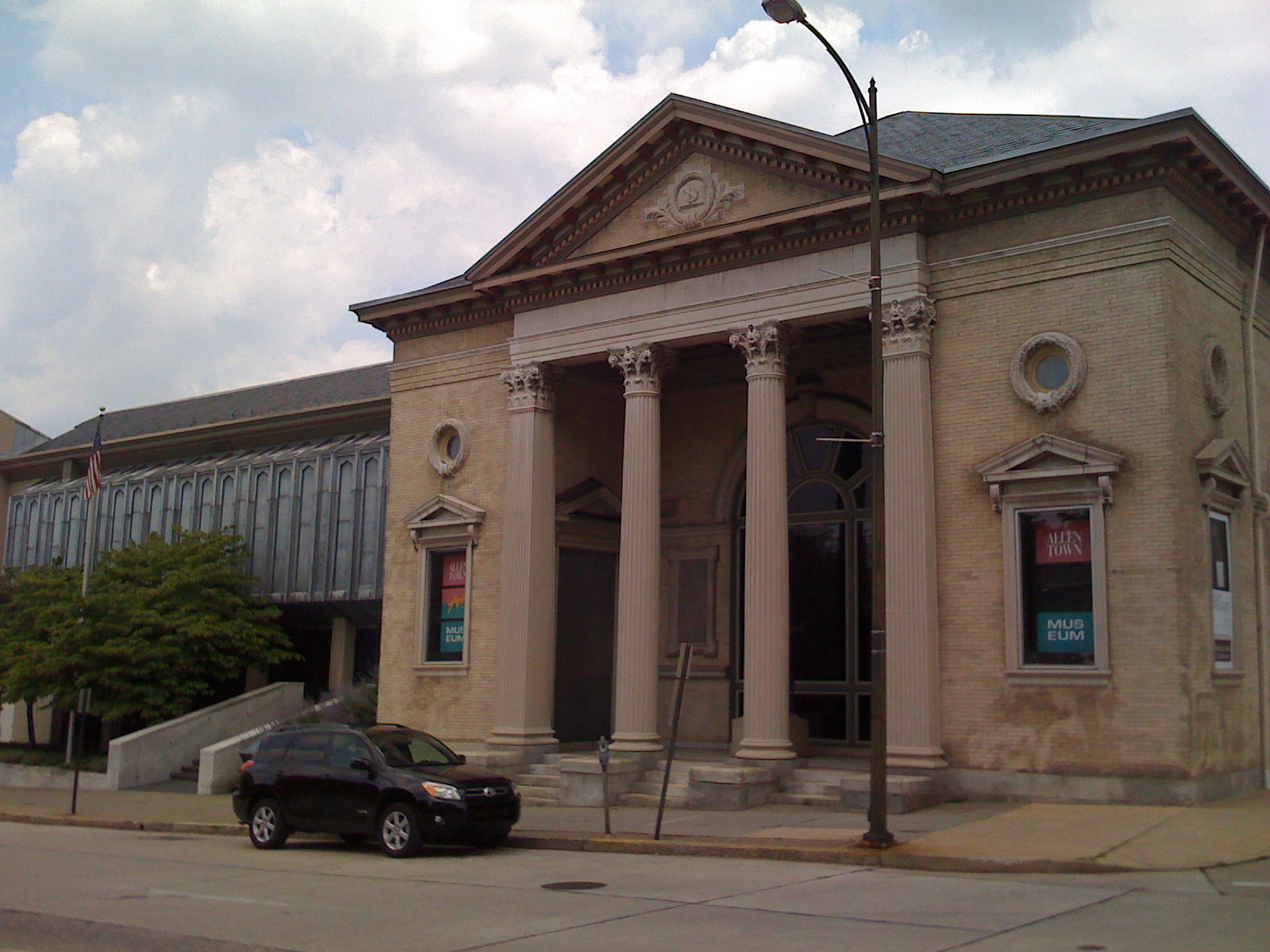
- Allentown Art Museum in July 2008
- Established: March 17, 1934; 92 years ago
- Location: 31 N. 5th Street; Allentown, Pennsylvania, U.S.
- Director: Max Weintraub
- Public transit access: LANta bus: 102, 107, 209, 210, 220, 324
- Website: www.allentownartmuseum.org

The Allentown Art Museum of the Lehigh Valley is an art museum located in Allentown, Pennsylvania. It was founded in 1934 by a group organized by Walter Emerson Baum, a Pennsylvania impressionist painter.

The museum maintains a collection of over 20,000 works of art and is a major regional art institution. The museum also maintains a library and archives containing over 16,000 titles and 40 current periodicals.

== History ==
=== 20th century ===
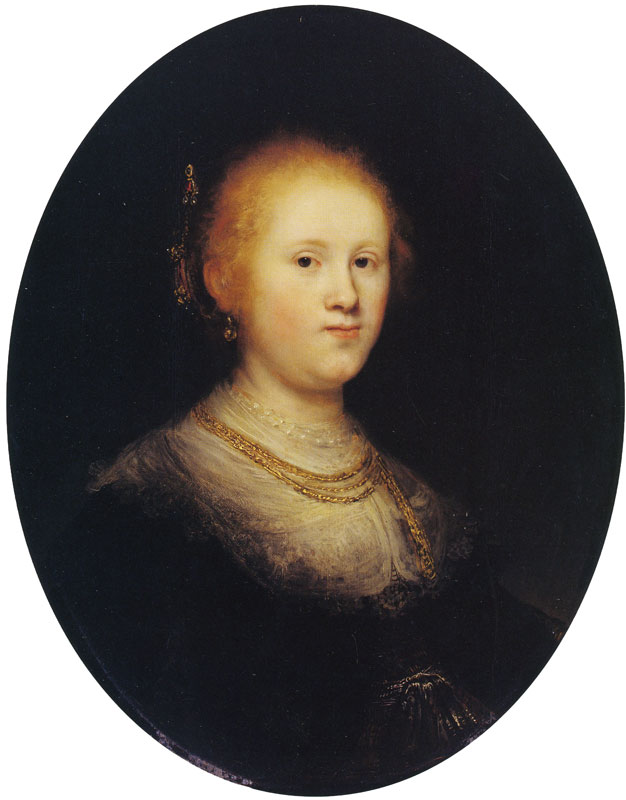
Rembrandt's 1632 Portrait of a Young Woman at the museum

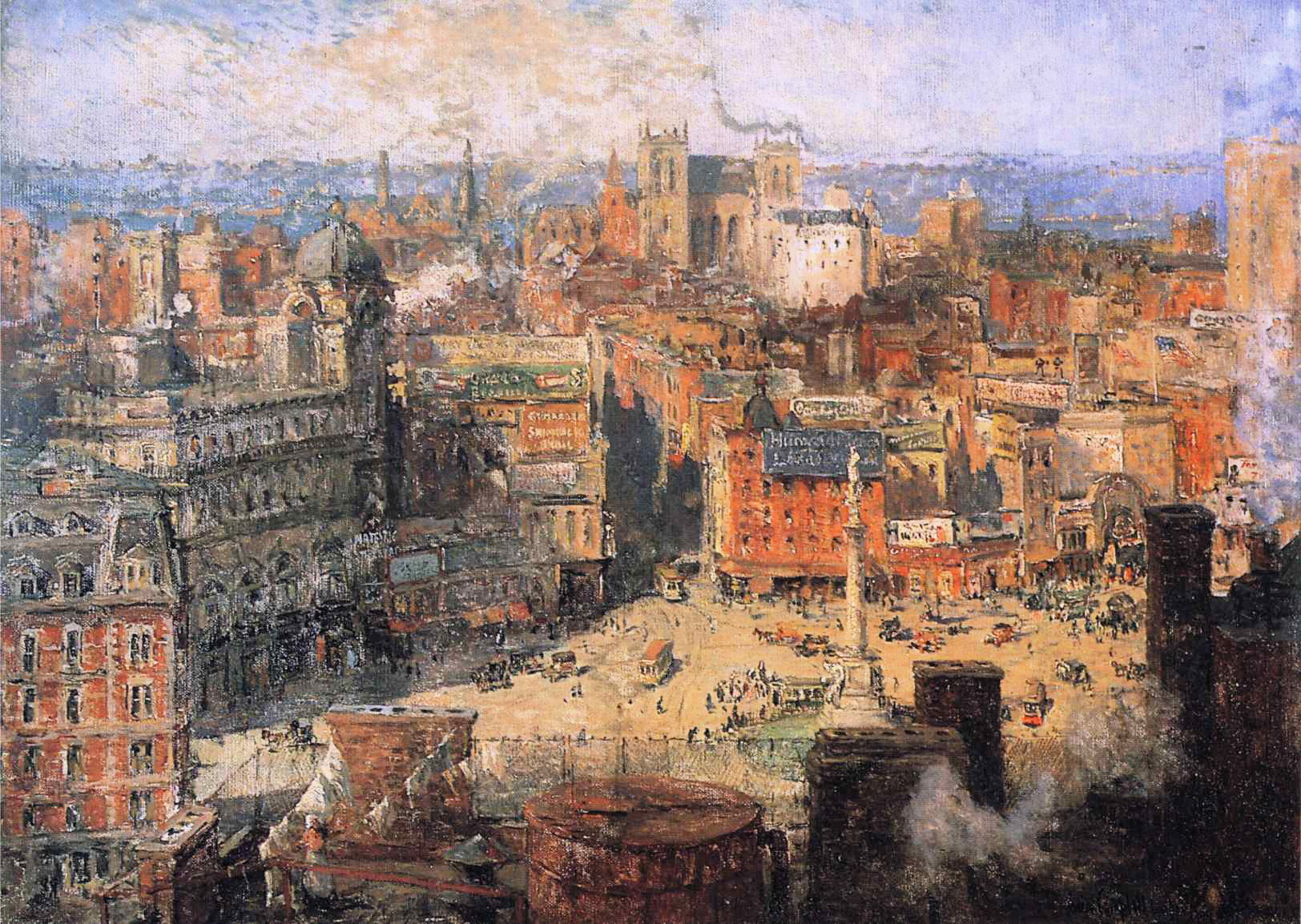
Colin Campbell Cooper's Columbus Circle, a 1909 impressionist portrait of Columbus Circle at the museum

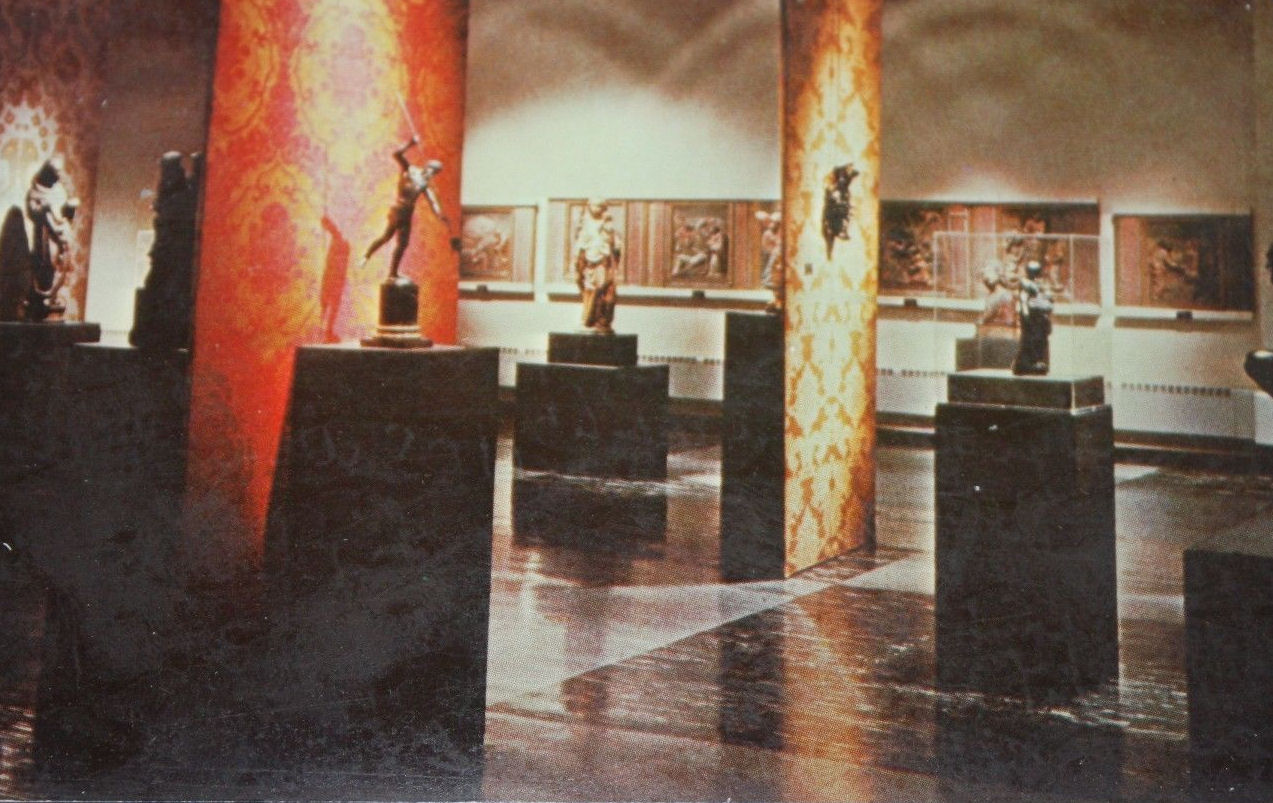
The Samuel H. Kress collection at the museum in 1965

Allentown Art Museum was founded originally as Allentown Art Gallery and organized by Walter Emerson Baum. It opened in Allentown's Hunsicker School on March 17, 1934. With 70 canvases by local Pennsylvania impressionist artists on display, the gallery attracted major attention from local and regional art communities.

During the Great Depression, Baum was able to grow the collection through the Public Works of Art Project and through acquisitions and gifts. In June 1936, the City of Allentown granted the museum a permanent home in a Federal-style house located in the Rose Garden in Allentown's Cedar Park. The museum's first curator was John E. Berninger, a local artist who lived with his wife on the museum's second floor.

In 1959, a gift of 53 Renaissance and Baroque paintings and sculptures from Samuel H. Kress, a native of nearby Cherryville, Pennsylvania, brought the museum to a new level. The Kress gift served to encourage community visionaries and museum friends to purchase and refurbish a building, formerly the First Presbyterian Church, built in 1902, suitable to house the new collection.

In 1960, the Kress gift was featured in the museum's first major catalog, The Samuel H. Kress Memorial Collection, written by Richard Hirsch, the institution's first director. In his introduction, Hirsch observed how the fleeting imagery of TV changed perceptions of the collection's works. When created, they were not merely one of many representations of religious figures but of the figures themselves. Hirsch's observations portend the Slow Movement that arose over 25 years later and encouraged a renewed, attentive appreciation of the world, including of fine art. The museum later began hosted Slow Art days in 2011 to acknowledge the benefits of quiet, intense reflection.

In 1975, an Edgar Tafel-designed expansion to the building enhanced the museum's programs and collecting plans. The museum installed a library from the second Francis W. Little House that was designed by Frank Lloyd Wright. A second room from the Francis W. Little House was built at the Metropolitan Museum of Art in New York City.

Also in 1975, the museum's collection was expanded with the addition of European paintings and a large collection of textile arts. In 1978, the museum acquired Gilbert Stuart's portrait of Ann Penn Allen, granddaughter of William Allen, the founder of Allentown.

=== 21st century ===
In 2010, the museum completed a $15.4 million expansion project designed by Venturi Scott Brown, a Philadelphia-based architecture firm to renovate the museum. The project added 7,900 square feet (730 m^{2}) of new classroom and gallery space, including a corner cafe, an expanded gift shop, and a new all-glass façade to the museum's Fifth Street side.

The expansion, which was the museum's first since 1975, had been initially proposed in 1999 but ended up to be a significant reduction from the $32 million, 45,000-square-foot (4,200 m^{2}) addition originally planned. Approximately 40% of the new space was allocated to gallery space.

== Current collection ==
=== Lehighton ===
In 2016, the museum acquired Lehighton, a mural by Franz Kline, which the artist created for the American Legion in Lehighton, Pennsylvania. Following intensive work on the mural by Luca Bonetti Painting Restoration, the restored painting was unveiled to the public in January 2017.

=== Rembrandt's Portrait of a Young Lady ===
On February 10, 2020, Portrait of a Young Lady, a 1632 portrait by Rembrandt in the museum's collection, was determined to be authentic following a reassessment of it.

=== American art ===
- Ann Penn Allen by Gilbert Stuart (1795)
- Niagara Falls by Gustav Johann Grunewald (1834)
- Floriform Vase by Tiffany Studios (1905)

=== European art ===
- Central Panel of an Altarpiece Mystic Marriage of Saint Catherine by Giovanni del Biondo (1379)
- Saint Jerome Penitent by Lorenzo Lotto (1515)
- Portrait of Henrica Ploost van Amstel by Paulus Moreelse (1625)
- Game Stall at Market, by Frans Snyders (1625–37)
- Portrait of a Young Woman by Rembrandt (1632)

=== Prints and drawings ===
- Diogenes after Parmigiano by Ugo da Carpi (after 1525)
- Il Perdono (Vision of Saint Francis of Assisi) by Federico Barocci (1581)
- Untitled by Keith Haring (1982)

=== Textiles ===
- Table Cover by Margaret Oothout (1764)
- Bed Curtain (Palampore) from the Coromandel Coast in India (1775)

== See also ==
- List of historic places in Allentown, Pennsylvania
