= Christopher Sower =

Christopher Sower may refer to any one of a father-son-grandson trio:

- Christopher Sower (elder) (1693–1758), American printer
- Christopher Sower (younger) (1721–1784), American printer
- Christopher Sower III (1754–1799), American printer
