= Pennsylvania German Society =

- Formation: 1891
- Founder: Jeremiah S. Hess
- Founded at: Hellertown, Pennsylvania, U.S.
- Type: Nonprofit
- Purpose: Development and preservation of Pennsylvania Dutch
- Website: pgs.org

The Pennsylvania German Society is a non-profit, educational organization dedicated to studying the Pennsylvania German people and their 330-year history in the United States and Canada. The society works to preserve and promote the history, culture, religion, and dialect of the Pennsylvania Germans, also commonly known as the Pennsylvania Dutch. It was founded in 1891 and was a founding member of the Pennsylvania Federation of Historical Societies.

Regular efforts and activities of the Society include:

- Der Reggeboge (“The Rainbow”), the biannual journal published by the Society. (ISSN 0034-3269)
- Es Elbedritsch (“The Elbedritsch”), the biannual newsletter of the Society.
- A special hard-cover annual volume.
- An annual meeting in which speakers present on all aspects of Pennsylvania Dutch history, culture, religion, dialect, etc. (cancelled since 2020)

It has EIN 23-1675745 as a 501(c)(3) Public Charity; in 2024 it claimed total revenue of $47,338 and total assets of $13,184. In 2001, it claimed total revenue of $139,178 and total assets of $340,840.

== Foundation of the Pennsylvania German Society ==
The Pennsylvania German Society was organized in a series of four meetings from February to April 1891. The delegates present at the organizational meetings shared a number of characteristics. They were Pennsylvania German in family background, city dwellers, upper middle class professionals, and business men. They were older men having been born largely in the 1830s and 1840s, and they were well established in their careers. A large number were college graduates. It is likely that all knew and on occasion spoke the Pennsylvania German dialect and that most could read and speak standard High German.

=== Concerns of the founders ===
Among the concerns of the founders was that railroad, factory, city, and public school would erode quickly most evidence of their culture, present in the United States and centered in Pennsylvania for over two hundred years. It was a distinctive culture, largely based in an agrarian society of an earlier age, and they were determined to preserve the knowledge about it from obliteration. In their minds, the time was ripe for an organized effort to preserve the culture which they were proud of.

Another concern motivated the founders. They were proud of their forefathers who had contributed significantly to the development of Pennsylvania and the nation, and they were convinced that their contribution had been neglected by the New England and Virginia historians who had written most American histories to that date They were determined to repair the omission and to give to the Pennsylvania Germans proper credit for the winning of independence during the Revolutionary War and for the preservation of the Union during the Civil War.

The founders of the Society wanted their people to develop pride in their culture. This purpose was stated clearly in the call for the convention:

It is entirely proper that the descendants of these people [early German and Swiss settlers] should associate themselves in the memory of those who “made the wilderness blossom as the rose,” to show to the offspring of other nationalities that they are not behind them in any of the attributes which go to make up the best citizens of the best state in the best Government of the world. In the art of printing, in the realm of science and letters, in religious fervor, in pure statesmanship, in war and peace, the Pennsylvania-German-Swiss element has equalled [sic] any other race.

The founders wrote of German and Swiss ancestors of the Pennsylvania Germans rather than only of German ancestors. The Germanic ancestors that arrived in Pennsylvania in the 17th and 18th centuries arrived primarily from the Swiss Federation and the counties and kingdoms that would later unite into the German Empire in 1871. Furthermore, it is notable that their concern was only with the 17th and 18th century settlers of Pennsylvania. They were not interested in German and Swiss settlers of the 19th century and later.

=== Pre-foundational meetings ===
During December, 1890 and January, 1891 articles appeared in several newspapers, such as the Lebanon Daily Report, the Lancaster New Era, and the Philadelphia Inquirer, suggesting an organization of descendants of the German and Swiss settlers of colonial Pennsylvania. Frank R. Diffenderffer, an editor of the New Era, corresponded with William Henry Egle, State Librarian, about this matter. This led to a meeting hosted by Diffenderffer in his office on February 14, 1891, which was attended by Egle, John Stahr, J. Max Hark, R. K. Buehrle and E. O. Lyte. The attendees decided to call a meeting of “...representative men in the German counties of Eastern Pennsylvania to an informal conference in the City of Lancaster on the 26th of February.”

On February 26, 1891, a meeting was held in the study of the Rev. Dr. J. Max Hark in the Moravian parsonage in Lancaster. It was attended by fifteen men representing nine counties: Carbon, Chester, Dauphin, Lancaster, Lebanon, Lehigh, Luzerne, Northampton and York. Egle presided at the meeting, and Diffenderffer served as secretary. The outcome of the meeting was a unanimous decision to set up an organization “…having for its aim the collection and preservation of all landmarks and records relating to the early German and Swiss immigrants to Pennsylvania, and the development of a friendly and fraternal spirit among all united by the ties of a common ancestry.” The emphasis upon the “development of a friendly and fraternal spirit” is quite strong in statements of the founders, suggesting that such a spirit may not have existed in the past. After much discussion, the committee agreed to name the proposed society the Pennsylvania-German Society rather than the Pennsylvania-Dutch Society. The call for the April 15 convocation was adopted in a meeting held on March 9, 1891, and was printed widely in Pennsylvania.

Frank R. Diffenderffer was a central figure in the organization of the Pennsylvania-German Society and assumed a leading role in the lead-up to the convocation. He has been called the founder of the Pennsylvania-German Society, although no such designation has been officially made.

=== Founding convention ===
The organizing convention was held in the Lancaster County Courthouse on April 15, 1891. There were 126 delegates, all male, from Philadelphia and 15 Pennsylvania counties: Berks, Carbon, Chester, Clearfield, Cumberland, Dauphin, Franklin, Lancaster, Lebanon, Lehigh, Luzerne, Montgomery, Northampton, Westmoreland, and York. Lancaster County was represented by 63 delegates, the most of any county. The convention was conducted in a manner similar to that of a state political convention. The delegates were seated according to the counties they represented. George F. Baer, resident of Reading, Pennsylvania, and later president of the Philadelphia and Reading Railroad Company from 1901 to 1913, was elected the temporary chairman of the convention.

The most important issue decided at the convention was the adoption of the society's constitution, which provided that the name of the society was to be the Pennsylvania-German Society and that its purposes were:

First: To perpetuate the memory and foster the principles and virtues of the German ancestors of its members, and to-promote social intercourse among the latter.

Secondly: To discover, collect and preserve all still existing documents, monuments, etc., relating to the genealogy and history of the Pennsylvania-Germans, and from time to time publish them, particularly as shall set forth the part belonging to this people in the growth and development of American character, institutions, and progress.

Thirdly: To gather by degrees a library for the use of the Society, composed of all obtainable books, monographs, pamphlets, manuscripts, etc., relating to the Pennsylvania-Germans.

Fourthly: To cause statedly to be prepared and read before the Society, papers, essays, etc., on questions in the history or genealogy of the Pennsylvania-Germans.

One issue which resulted in lengthy debate was that of qualification for regular membership in the Society. The proposed constitution provided for three classes of members: regular, associate and honorary. It defined the qualifications for regular membership as being “…of full age, of good moral character, and a direct descendant of early German or Swiss emigrants to Pennsylvania.” In effect, this provision denied regular membership to persons who were born in Germany or who were born of nineteenth-century or later German immigrants.

The two delegates from Philadelphia who also represented the German Society of Pennsylvania, General Louis Wagner and Professor Oswald Seidensticker of the University of Pennsylvania, had been born in Germany. To those supporting the proposal regarding regular membership, only persons born in Pennsylvania or an adjacent state of early German descent were truly Pennsylvania German, and they alone should be eligible for regular membership. Persons born in Germany or born to nineteenth-century immigrants would be most welcome as associate members. Those opposing the proposal argued that “…many foreign-born Germans…had done more for the interests of the Pennsylvania-Germans, in studying and recording their history who had shown a truer interest in their cause, and were more truly in sympathy with the purpose and end of this Society, than any Pennsylvania-born Germans.” After much debate, the delegates adopted the original proposal. At that point Wagner and Seidensticker withdrew as delegates and joined the other spectators, though Wagner reiterated an early declaration of fraternal support of the new organization by the German Society of Pennsylvania. While this issue seemed to be decided at this point in history, it was not settled completely.

The session concluded with the election of the first permanent officers of the organization:

- President - Dr. Wm. H. Egle, Harrisburg
- Vice President - Hon. Edwin Albright, Allentown
- Secretary - F. R. Diffenderffer, Lancaster
- Treasurer - Julius F. Sachse, Esq., Berwyn.

An Executive committee and a Publications committee were appointed, and members were invited to pay their initiation fees before leaving for home. Later the president appointed sub-committees of finance, genealogy, history, and tradition in addition to one devoted to printing and publishing.

No formal action was taken as to the place, if any, of the Pennsylvania German dialect in the life and work of the Society. However, the fact that all the materials for calling the convocation were printed in English, that all the preliminary sessions were conducted in English and the records of-these proceedings were kept in English, that the governing documents were prepared in English, and that-the proceedings of the convention were conducted and recorded in English leads one to the conclusion that the Pennsylvania-German Society was to be composed of English-speaking descendants of the early German and Swiss immigrants to Pennsylvania and that its work was to be done in English. Many members might speak, read, and even write in the dialect they might regard as their mother tongue, but in the proceedings of the Society they would use English.

The place of the dialect in the lives of Pennsylvania-German people was dealt with directly by only one speaker on April 15. He was Col. Thomas C. Zimmerman of Reading, who described enduring achievements of representative Pennsylvania Germans in various fields of human endeavor. However, he expressed the opinion that:

…little can be said in favor of the perpetuation of the Pennsylvania-German dialect. ln other words, notwithstanding the extraordinary vitality of the vernacular which has survived the wreck of centuries, there-need be no undue solicitude about its gradual, but ultimate disappearance from the languages of the earth. lts somewhat limited capabilities have been fully tested by Harbaugh, Horne, Fisher, Rauch and others, all of whose writings show that while the dialect is ample for the ordinary needs of expression, from its inherent limitations it lacks compass and flexibility. But the compulsory teaching of English in our public schools must eventually displace it as a medium of intercourse, even in this section where its lodgment has been so deep seated and its use so general.

He concluded by stating that the dialect “…should take its place as a purely secondary lingual accomplishment.” Col. Zimmerman's view, however, was not sanctioned by the Society at the convocation and did not become the Society's position.

== Early years ==
The Pennsylvania-German Society conducted its business after its foundation primarily through an annual meeting held in southeastern and south-central Pennsylvania. At this meeting, members of the Society read papers that they submitted to the Society. The affairs of each annual meeting as well as the papers that were read were published in Proceedings documenting the annual meeting.

During its first six years, the Society printed short historical papers and speeches about the Pennsylvania Germans. At the annual meeting in 1895, Secretary Henry Melchior Muhlenberg Richards proposed planning a research program. His idea was to prepare a complete history of the Pennsylvania Germans.

The idea was implemented, and the Society published the first volume the following year: Pennsylvania: The German Influence in Its Settlement and Development, A Narrative and Critical History. The Society published a series entitled Narrative and Critical History in 33 parts from 1897 to 1929 covering all aspects of Pennsylvania German immigration, culture, and religion.

=== World War I ===
World War I had a negative impact on Pennsylvania Germans, and the Pennsylvania German Society was no exception. In the midst of a wave of anti-German sentiment, Pennsylvania Germans were vilified as German descendants and immigrants in the United States. Despite having been a part of American society for roughly four generations, at a minimum, many assumed that Pennsylvania Germans were sympathetic with Germany and, more particularly, the greatly vilified Kaiser Wilhelm II.

The Pennsylvania German Society lowered its profile in World War I. It suspended its annual meetings of 1917, 1918, and 1919, although it did publish annual volumes during those years. The executive committee of the Pennsylvania German Society continued to meet, and several meetings were held at the Historical Society of Berks County.

The annual meetings of the Pennsylvania German Society resumed in 1920. Then president, Paul de Schweinitz, expressed regret during the annual meeting at Norristown Pennsylvania, on October 8, 1920, at the suspension of the annual meetings during World War I:

Sometimes it has seemed to me, that perhaps after all it would have been a good thing if we had met during the war years for the very purpose of being afforded an opportunity to voice in actual publicly spoken word the unquestioned loyalty to the United States and to democratic government of these descendants of the early German settlers of Pennsylvania.

=== Post-war activities ===
Following the war, a number of prominent men were elected to serve as president of the Society, including among them Martin Brumbaugh, who served as governor of Pennsylvania during the war. The 30th volume of the Pennsylvania German Society, published in 1924, was a dictionary prepared by Marcus B. Lambert and entitled A Dictionary of the Non-English Words of the Pennsylvania-German Dialect, With an Appendix. It was the first Pennsylvania Dutch dictionary of the modern era.

At the annual meeting held in the Pennsylvania Building at the Sesqui-Centennial of American Independence in Philadelphia in 1926, the Pennsylvania German Society adopted a resolution praising the Pennsylvania Germans in Canada. It sent a copy of the resolution to Waterloo, Ontario. The report of the annual meeting looked back at the accomplishments of the last 35 years:

To us now it seems almost unbelievable to remember that, with few exceptions, the general impression existing amongst unlettered men and women was to the effect that the people of our blood were but “coarse and ignorant boors,” because, forsooth, besides the English language, they spoke largely a dialect which their highly cultured neighbors, who spoke but one language themselves and that more or less improperly, could not understand.
Today the lusty babe of 1891 has become a veritable giant, recognized and respected by all whose opinions are worth having.
Following out its aim to disseminate information rather than to gather a library or establish a permanent headquarters, it has issued thirty-two magnificent volumes unexcelled by those of any Society in existence.

In 1930, the Society was incorporated under a general act of the Legislature. A charter was approved by Charles I. Landis, the President Judge of the Court of Common Pleas of Lancaster County, on April 19, 1930. Landis had been president of the Society in 1924.

Two aspects of the charter were notable. The first was that it confirmed that the requirement for voting membership in the Society was direct descent from Pennsylvania German settlers. The second was that it removed the term limits for certain board members. From its beginning, the Pennsylvania German Society had prohibited reelection of the president, vice president, and treasurer of the Society. The charter, however, removed such prohibition. As a result, the Society entered the age of longer presidencies. Ralph Beaver Strassburger, who had been elected in 1928, was the first president to serve for more than one term and ultimately served for 12 terms.

=== World War II ===
The Pennsylvania German Society fared better during World War II than it did during World War I. It continued to hold its annual meetings. In 1941, it held its 50th anniversary meeting in Lancaster, Pennsylvania.

== The Pennsylvania German Folklore Society ==
Although the issue of the ancestry requirement for regular membership of the Pennsylvania-German Society seemed to be decided at the foundational meeting and confirmed in its articles of incorporation, it was not. It continued to smolder underground over the years and reappeared in 1935 in the organization of the Pennsylvania German Folklore Society, which did not require proof of descent from seventeenth- and eighteenth-century German or Swiss immigrants as a condition for membership.

The place of the dialect, not only in the daily lives of the people, but also as a vehicle for literary expression, also continued to trouble Pennsylvania Germans long after the founding of the Pennsylvania German Society in 1891. Many discovered that it had an inner beauty which justified its use in prose and poetry, as well as in speech, and that it deserved to be studied and preserved in its pure form. This conviction was another factor which led to the formation of the Pennsylvania German Folklore Society in 1935.

On May 4, 1935, the Pennsylvania German Folklore Society was formed in Allentown, Pennsylvania to collect and preserve the contributions of the Pennsylvania Germans. The Folklore Society did not restrict full membership to those of Pennsylvania German ancestry. Like the Pennsylvania German Society, the Pennsylvania German Folklore Society issued annual volumes, the first in 1936 covering dialect poems of Charles Calvin Ziegler, papers by Joseph Downs on the Millbach House and on the Pennsylvania German Galleries in the Metropolitan Museum of Art, a paper by W. J. Hinke and J. B. Stoudt on German immigrants from Zweibruecken, 1728–49, and a catalogue of the Pennsylvania Folk Art Exhibition held that year in Bethlehem, Pennsylvania.

=== Development of the Buffington-Barba orthography ===
As discussed supra, in 1924, the Pennsylvania German Society published a dictionary prepared by Marcus B. Lambert, titled A Dictionary of the Non-English Words of the Pennsylvania-German Dialect, With an Appendix. The preface discussed previous systems of spelling Pennsylvania German, Pennsylvania German phonology, and the transcription used by Lambert in the dictionary. There were 16,438 entries.

The Lambert dictionary used a German-based orthography for the Pennsylvania Dutch dialect, rejecting previous attempts which used English-based orthographies. The dictionary was quite popular and superior to prior attempts. The Pennsylvania German Society reprinted the dictionary in 1965 because of demand. However, some still found deficiencies in the orthography used.

In 1954, Albert F. Buffington and Preston Barba released their influential grammar, A Pennsylvania German Grammar, which was published by Schlechter's of Allentown, PA. This grammar also proffered a German-based orthography, for Pennsylvania German and it became so popular that it is now considered to be the de facto official orthography for Pennsylvania German. The Pennsylvania German Folklore Society published a revised edition of Buffington's and Barba's influential grammar in 1965 as volume 27 of its annual series.

=== Merger with the Pennsylvania German Society ===
Both facing declining memberships and financial strains, the Pennsylvania German Society and the Pennsylvania German Folklore Society merged in 1965 to form The Pennsylvania German Society. The official name of the Society was changed in 1965 to add a capitalized “The” at the beginning. The two Societies had many overlapping members, notably Preston Barba and Albert Buffington among others.

== Present-day Pennsylvania German Society ==
The Society publishes an annual volume that also focuses on all aspects of Pennsylvania German culture and continues to publish dialect materials and to encourage the study of the dialect through the use of grammars, dictionaries, and courses.

The Society publishes two periodicals, Der Reggeboge (Pennsylvania German for “The Rainbow”) and Es Elbedritsch (named after the Elbedritsch, which is Pennsylvania-German for “Elwetritsch”). Der Reggeboge is a semi-annual journal devoted to Pennsylvania German culture and history, and Es Elbedritsch is a semi-annual newsletter detailing activities of the Society and other aspects of Pennsylvania German culture.

=== List of presidents ===
Year	Name
1891	Hon. George F. Baer (presiding officer at the organizational meeting)
1892	William H. Egle, M.D.
1893	Henry L. Fisher, Esq.
1894	The Rev. George C. Heckman, D.D.
1895	Hon. Samuel Whitaker Pennypacker
1896	Frank Diffenderfer, Litt. D.
1897	The Rev. Theodore E. Schmauck, D.D.
1898	The Rev. Nathan C. Schaeffer, Ph.D., D.D.
1899	E. Winfield Scott Parthemore
1900	The Rev. Franklin J. F. Schantz, D.D.
1901	The Rev. Thomas C. Porter, D.D.
1902	Professor Charles F. Himes, Ph.D.
1902	The Rev. Joseph H. Dubbs, D.D.
1903	The Rev. Joseph A. Seiss, D.D.
1904	The Rev. John S. Stahr, Ph.D., D.D.
1905	Hon. James A. Beaver
1906	Hon. Gustav A. Endlich
1907	Benjamin M. Nead, Esq.
1908	Hon. John Wanamaker
1909	Thomas C. Zimmerman, Litt. D.
1910	General John E. Roller
1911	The Rev. Henry E. Jacobs, D.D.
1912	Capt. Henry M. M. Richards, Litt. D.
1913	Benjamin F. Fackenthal, Jr., Sc. D.
1914	Julius F. Sachse, Litt. D.
1915	Hon. William R. Hensel, Litt. D.
1915	William F. Muhlenberg, M. D.
1915	Hon. Harmon Yerkes
1916	Prof. George T. Ettinger, Ph.D.
1917	The Rev. Jacob Fry, D.D.
1918	The Rev. L. Kyder Evans
1919	The Rev. Raul DeSchweinitz, D.D.
1920	General Harry C. Trexler
1921	The Rev. George W. Sandt. D.D.
1922	Dr. Edgar Fahs Smith
1923	Prof. Edgar Dubs Shimer, Ph.D.
1924	Hon. Charles I. Landis
1925	The Rev. Charles B. Schneder, D.D.
1926	Elmer E. S. Johnson, Ph.D., D.D.
1927	Hon. Martin. G. Brumbaugh
1928-1940	Ralph Beaver Strassburger, LL.D.
1941-1951	Henry S. Borneman, LL.D.
1952-1957	William S. Troxell
1958-1965	Homer T. Rosenberger, LL.D.
1966-1969	Dr. Arthur D. Graeff
1970-1971	Richard A. Abbott
1972	Ira D. Landis
1973-1979	Dr. Mahlon Hellerich
1980-1992	The Rev. Richard Druckenbrod
1993-1994	John Diffenderfer, Esq.
1995-2004	Robert Kline, M.D.
2005-2009	David L. Valuska, Ph.D.
2010	Ronald S. Treichler
2011-2013	N. Daniel Schwalm
2014–present	Thomas J. Gerhart

== See also ==
- Pennsylvania Dutch
- Pennsylvania German language
- Fersommling
- Hiwwe wie Driwwe
- German-Pennsylvanian Association
- German Society of Pennsylvania
