= German American journalism =

German American journalism includes newspapers, magazines, and the newer media, with coverage of the reporters, editors, commentators, producers and other key personnel. The German Americans were thoroughly assimilated by the 1920s, and German language publications one by one closed down for lack of readers.

== Early press in Pennsylvania ==
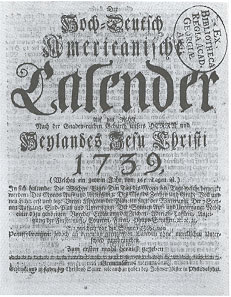
Front page of Sower's almanac (1739 ed.)

Pennsylvania was the population, religious, cultural, and intellectual center of German America. While few Germans lived in Philadelphia itself, it was a convenient center for publications. Benjamin Franklin tried and failed to set up the German language newspaper. The first publisher was Christopher Sower (also spelled Sauer or Saur) (1693-1758) who emigrated to Philadelphia in 1724 and began publishing German language books, Bibles, and religious pamphlets in 1738. In 1739 he started a monthly paper, Der Hoch-Deutsch Pennsylvanische Geschichts-Schreiber ("High German Pennsylvania Annalist"), later named Pennsylvanische Berichte ("Pennsylvania reports") and Die Germantauner Zeitung. It was one of the most influential pre-Revolutionary newspapers in the colonies. Sower emphasized news and controversy regarding the numerous Pennsylvania Dutch religious sects; he angered the large Lutheran community by regularly ridiculing its formalism.

The son Christopher Sower II (1721-1784) took over the business and as a leader of the German Baptist Brethren ("Dunker") sect opposed slavery and promoted pacifism. However, during the American Revolution he enthusiastically supported the Loyalist cause. His son Christopher Sower III (1754-1799) became editor and ridiculed the Patriots as "slaves of Congress and the scum of the population which were turning society upside down so that a shoemaker had become a general and a fisherman an admiral." The circulation was largely limited to soldiers, and when the war ended the father was reduced to poverty and the son went into exile and set up a German newspaper in the province of New Brunswick, Canada.

Most of the German press in colonial Pennsylvania supported the Patriot cause in the American Revolution. The most important figure was editor John Henry Miller, an immigrant from Germany. He published a German translation of the Declaration of Independence (1776) in his newspaper Philadelphische Staatsbote. Miller often wrote about Swiss history and myth, such as the William Tell legend, to provide a context for patriot support in the conflict with Britain.

In the period 1772 to the early 1840s, few Germans immigrated to Pennsylvania, so there was little infusion of advanced journalistic technique from Germany. The numerous small newspapers focused increasingly on the local Pennsylvania Dutch community, and changed the language from high German to the local dialect. By 1802, Pennsylvanian Germans published newspapers not only in Philadelphia, but also in Lancaster, Reading, Easton, Harrisburg, York, and Norristown. The oldest German Catholic newspaper, the Cincinnati Archdiocese's Der Wahrheitsfreund, began publishing in 1837.

== Early Press with nationwide distribution ==
J. G. Wesselhoeft in Philadelphia established Alte und Neue Welt in 1834 and expanded it with the help of William Radde.

== Civil War ==
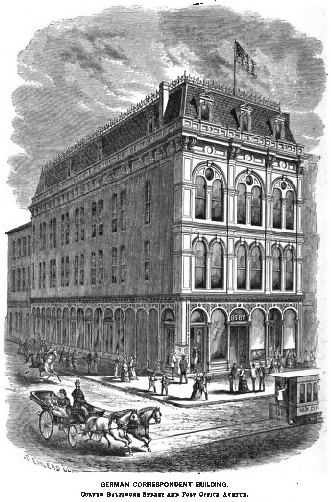
Building of Der Deutsche Correspondent in Baltimore

Many Forty-Eighters had fled to America after the failure of the liberal revolution in Germany. Well educated, many became editors such as Emil Preetorius (1827 - 1905) in St. Louis, a major center of German culture in the west. He was a leader of the German American community as part owner and editor of the Westliche Post, in St. Louis (1864-1905). Franz Grimm, exiled editor of the 'Blätter der Zeit' in Brunswick, Germany, resettled across from St. Louis in Belleville, Illinois, where his Belleviller Zeitung became an influential voice for the German-Americans of southern Illinois. Grimm was influential in supporting Abraham Lincoln for the 1860 nomination and in explaining the issues of the war to his readers.

Forty-Eighter Hermann Raster wrote passionately against slavery and for Lincoln. Raster published anti-slavery pamphlets and was the editor of the most influential German language newspaper in America at the time. He helped secure the votes of German-Americans across the United States for Abraham Lincoln. When Raster died the Chicago Tribune published an article regarding his service as a correspondent for America to the German states saying, "His writings during and after the Civil War did more to create understanding and appreciation of the American situation in Germany and to float U.S. bonds in Europe than the combined efforts of all the U.S. ministers and consuls."

== Late 19th century ==
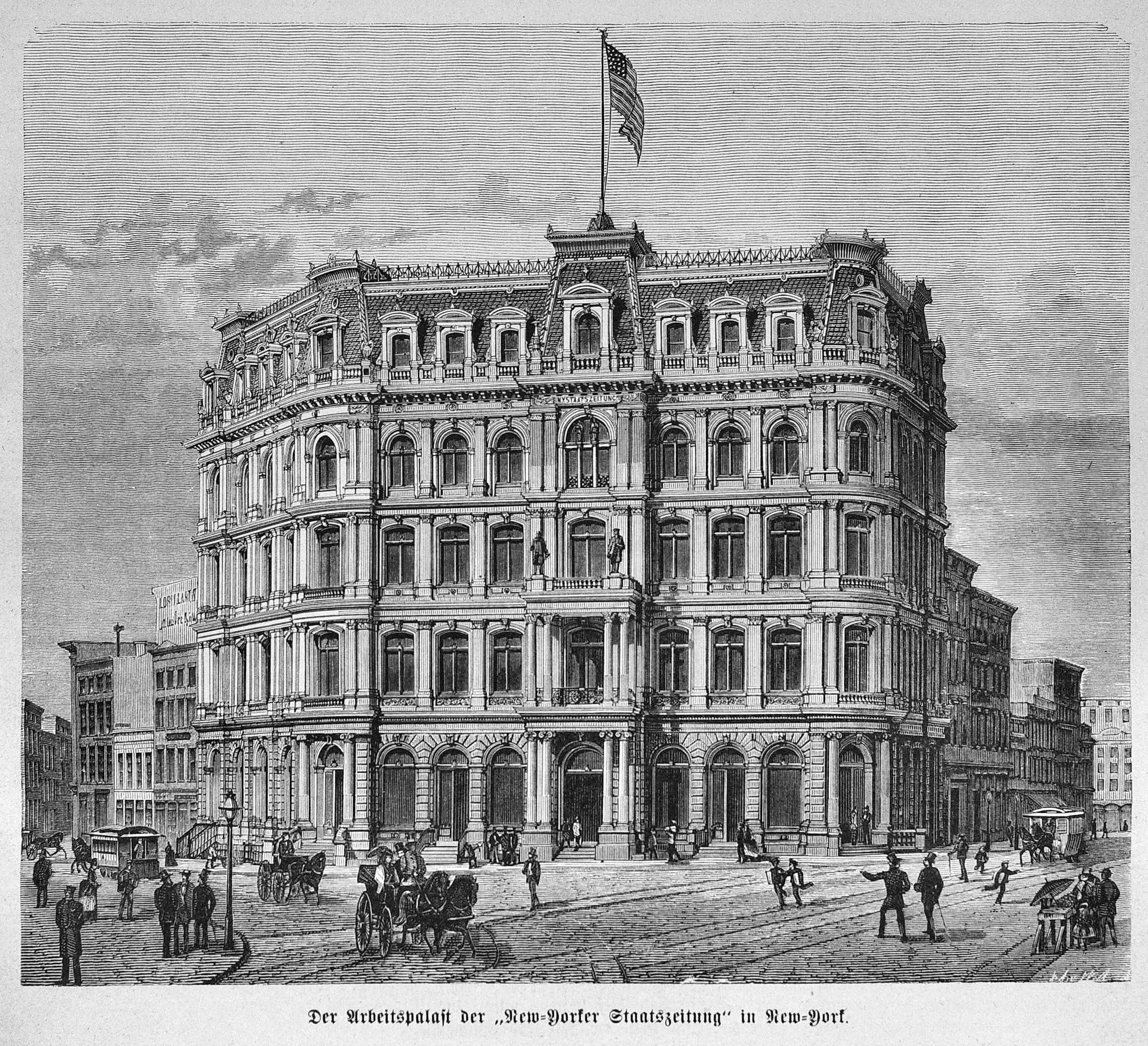
The New Yorker Staats-Zeitung building as it stood following its 1873 expansion

As for any immigrant population, the development of a foreign-language press helped immigrants more easily learn about their new home, maintain connections to their native land, and unite immigrant communities. By the late 19th century, Germania published over 800 regular publications. The most prestigious daily newspapers, such as the New Yorker Staats-Zeitung, the Anzeiger des Westens in St. Louis, and the Illinois Staats-Zeitung in Chicago, promoted middle-class values and encouraged German ethnic loyalty among their readership. The Germans were proud of their language, supported many German-language public and private schools, and conducted their church services in German. They published at least two-thirds of all foreign language newspapers in the U.S. The papers were owned and operated in the U.S., with no control from Germany. As Wittke emphasizes, the German-American press was "essentially an American press published in a foreign tongue." The papers reported on major political and diplomatic events involving Germany, with pride but from the viewpoint of its American readers. For example, during the latter half of the 19th century, at least 176 different German-language publications began operations in the city of Cincinnati alone. Many of these publications folded within a year, while a select few, such as the Cincinnati Freie Presse, lasted nearly a century. Other cities experienced similar turnover among immigrant publications, especially from opinion press, which published little news and focused instead on editorial commentary.

German Americans in many cities, such as Milwaukee, brought their strong support of education, establishing German-language schools and teacher training seminaries (Töchter-Institut) to prepare students and teachers in German language training. By the late 19th century, the Germania Publishing Company was established in Milwaukee; it was a publisher of books, magazines, and newspapers in German.

Nicholas E. Gonner (1835-1892), a Catholic immigrant from Luxembourg, founded the Catholic Publishing Company of Dubuque, Iowa. His son Nicholas E. Gonner, Jr., (1870-1922) took over in 1892, editing two German language weeklies, an English language weekly, and the Daily Tribune, the only Catholic daily newspaper ever published in the United States.

Germany was a large country with many diverse subregions which contributed immigrants. Dubuque was the base of the Ostfriesische Nachrichten ("East Fresian News") from 1881 to 1971. It connected the 20,000 immigrants from East Friesland (Ostfriesland), Germany, to each other across the Midwest, and to their old homeland. In Germany East Friesland was often a topic of ridicule regarding backward rustics, but editor Leupke Hündling shrewdly combined stories of proud memories of Ostfriesland. By mixing local American and local German news, letters, poetry, fiction, and dialogue, the German-language newspaper allowed immigrants to honor their origins and celebrate their new life as highly prosperous farmers with much larger farms than were possible back in Ostfriesland. During both world wars, when Germany came under heavy attack, the paper stressed its humanitarian role, mobilizing readers to help the people of East Friesland with relief funds. Younger generations could usually speak German but not read it, so the subscription base dwindled away as the target audience Americanized itself.

Tens of thousands of German families immigrated directly to the Dakotas. They patronized 64 papers that operated between the 1870s and 1969, when the last German-language newspaper closed. The papers' roles evolved from preserving the language, heritage, and links to the old country, to promoting assimilation and Americanization.

== 20th century ==
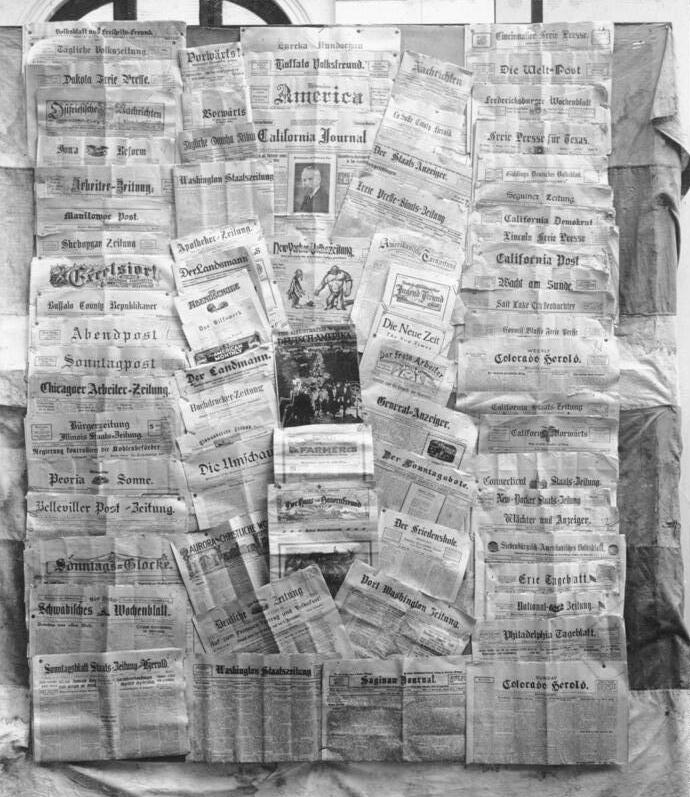
German newspapers in North America, 1922

Arthur Preuss (1871-1934) was a leading Catholic theologian and journalist. He was a layman in St Louis. His Fortnightly Review (in English) was a major conservative voice read closely by church leaders and intellectuals from 1894 until 1934. His father Edward Preuss was the editor of the most important German Catholic newspaper in the United States, Amerika, from 1877 to his death in 1902; Arthur then took it over. He was intensely loyal to the Vatican, and denounced all forms of modernism, especially the "Americanism" heresy, promoted the Catholic University of America, and anguished over the anti-German America hysteria during World War I. He provided lengthy commentary attacking the National Catholic Welfare Conference, and the anti-Catholic elements in the presidential campaign of 1928. He called for more equitable Catholic treatment of African-Americans, and was an early advocate of liturgical reform. After 1945, only a few new German publications have been started. One example is Hiwwe wie Driwwe (Kutztown, PA), the nation's only Pennsylvania German newspaper, which has been established in 1997.

== See also ==
- German American
- German language newspapers in the United States

=== Personalities ===
- Roger Ebert
- H. V. Kaltenborn (1878 - 1965), CBS radio news
- Anton C. Hesing (1823 – 1895), 19th century publisher and sheriff
- Thomas Nast (1840 – 1902), 19th century cartoonist
- Hermann Raster (1827 – 1891), 19th century editor and political figure
- Herman Ridder (1851 – 1915), German Catholic newspapers; New Yorker Staats-Zeitung
- Herbert Bayard Swope (1882 – 1958) reporter at the New York World; three Pulitzer Prizes
- Henry Villard (1835 – 1900) Chicago Tribune reporter; railroad financier
- Oswald Garrison Villard (1872 – 1949) owner of New York Evening Post, and the Nation magazine; an outspoken liberal isolationist in politics
- Michael Werner (*1965), founder and publisher of the Pennsylvania German newspaper "Hiwwe wie Driwwe"

=== Newspapers ===
See listing at German language newspapers in the United States

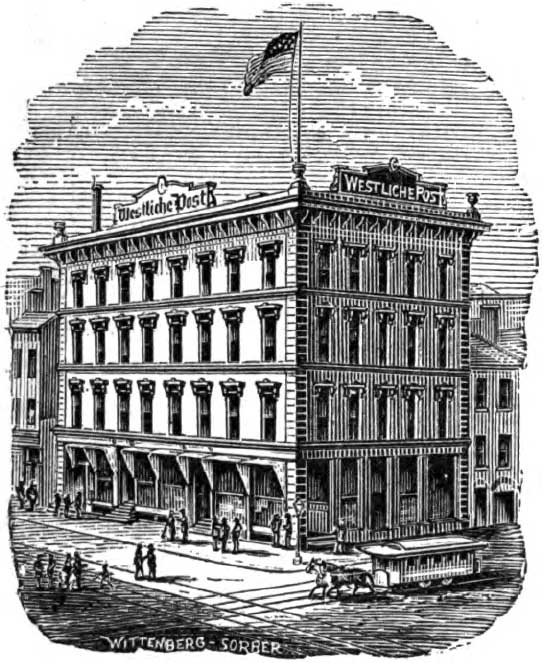
Westliche Post in St Louis
