= Christopher Sower III =

Printer and publisher (1754–1799)

Christopher Sower (27 January 1754 in Germantown, Pennsylvania – 3 July 1799 in Baltimore, Maryland) was a printer and publisher in Pennsylvania.

== Biography ==
He was the son of Christopher Sower the younger and the grandson of Christopher Sower the elder. He developed a strong distaste for those who criticized the German sectarians (Note: Quakers, Mennonites, Schwenkfelders, Moravians and the Dunker sect of his father. See George Harvey Genzmer (1935). "Sower, Christopher (September 1721 - August 26, 1784)". Dictionary of American Biography. New York: Charles Scribner's Sons.) and their beliefs. These critics included Benjamin Franklin, Henry Melchior Muhlenberg and John Henry Miller. With his preferences, Sower was naturally of loyalist sympathies before and during the Revolutionary War.

He received his father's Germantown home and printing and publishing operations in 1774 when they were handed over to him without legal formality. He then began publishing a newspaper, Germantowner Zeitung, which had a loyalist tone so far as the authorities allowed. When the British occupied Philadelphia in 1777, he moved there. During this time he was wounded and captured by rebel troops; he was released by exchange a short time later. He accompanied the British to New York City in 1778 when they abandoned Philadelphia. That year the family belongings were confiscated and sold by the rebels.

After Cornwallis's defeat in 1781, Sower went to England and received an indemnification for his losses. In 1785 he went to New Brunswick where he was deputy postmaster and king's printer. He died in the Baltimore house of his brother.

== See also ==
- German American journalism
