= Michael Werner =

Michael Werner may refer to:

- Michael Werner (footballer) (born 1969), former Australian rules footballer
- Michael Werner (publisher) (born 1965), founder of a Pennsylvania German newspaper
- Michael J. Werner, American film producer
- Michael Werner (art dealer) (born 1939), German art dealer, founder of the Galerie Michael Werner in Cologne
