= Josiah Kerr =

American politician (1861–1920)

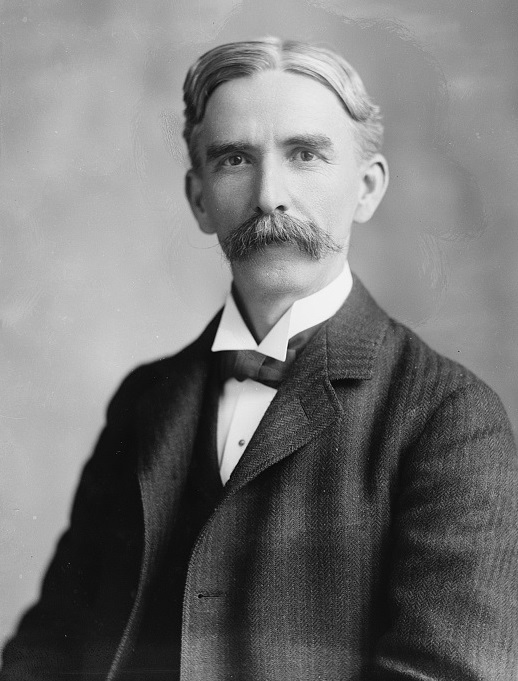
- Portrait of Kerr by Charles Milton Bell, taken between February 1894 and February 1901

Member of the U.S. House of Representatives from Maryland's 1st district
- In office November 6, 1900 – March 3, 1901
- Preceded by: John Walter Smith
- Succeeded by: William Humphreys Jackson

Personal details
- Born: Josiah Leeds Kerr; January 10, 1861 Vienna, Maryland, US
- Died: September 27, 1920 (aged 59) Cambridge, Maryland, US
- Party: Republican
- Occupation: Politician

Josiah Leeds Kerr (January 10, 1861 – September 27, 1920) was an American politician. A Republican, he was a member of the United States House of Representatives from Maryland.

== Biography ==
Kerr was born on January 10, 1861, in Vienna, Maryland, the son of Josiah L. Kerr Sr. and Kate (née Cromwell) Kerr. Educated at the public schools in Vienna, he later worked as an educator in Kennebec County, Maine. In 1880, he moved to Crisfield, Maryland, where he worked as a clerk for a lumber company. In 1885, he moved to Cambridge.

Kerr was a Republican, though was an Independent Republican and a leader of that political movement. From August 1898 to August 7, 1900, he served as a school superintendent. Following the death of John Walter Smith, he was elected to the United States House of Representatives, representing Maryland's 1st district from November 6, 1900, to March 3, 1901.

Kerr was not nominated for the following election, instead running for the Maryland Senate and losing to William F. Applegarth. He again ran for the State Senate in 1909, losing to J. Hooper Bosley. In 1916, he again ran for the U.S. House, losing the election. Ideologically, he was conservative.

After serving in Congress, Kerr returned to Cambridge and worked as a traveling salesman for printing and publishing company of Charles Gilbert Sower. He was married to Kate C. Jackson, with whom he had a son. He died there on September 27, 1920, aged 59, from indigestion, and was buried at Christ Episcopal Church and Cemetery, in Cambridge.

U.S. House of Representatives
| Preceded by John Walter Smith | Member of the U.S. House of Representatives from Maryland's 1st congressional district 1900–1901 | Succeeded by William Humphreys Jackson |
