= 1897 Maryland Comptroller election =

- November 2, 1897
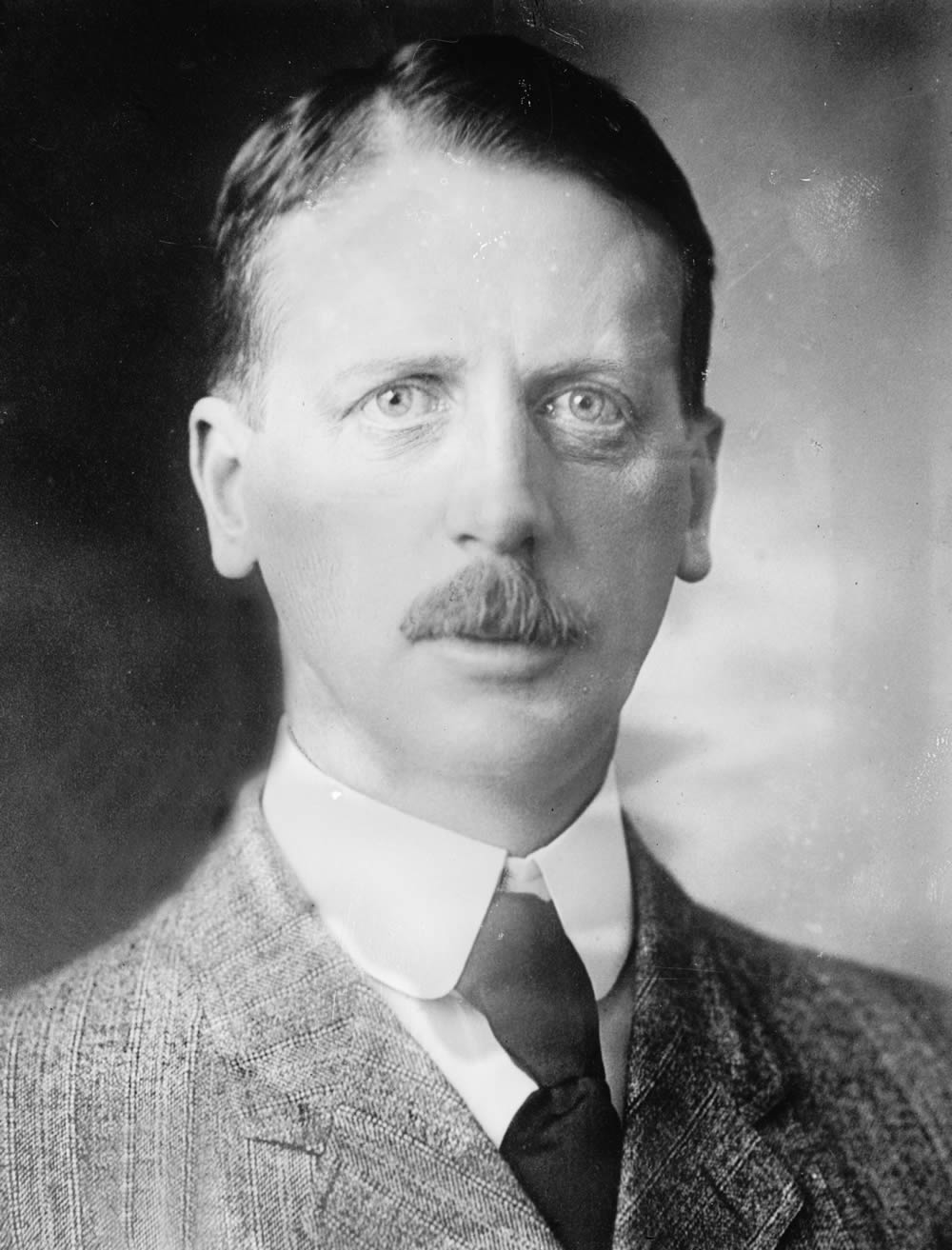

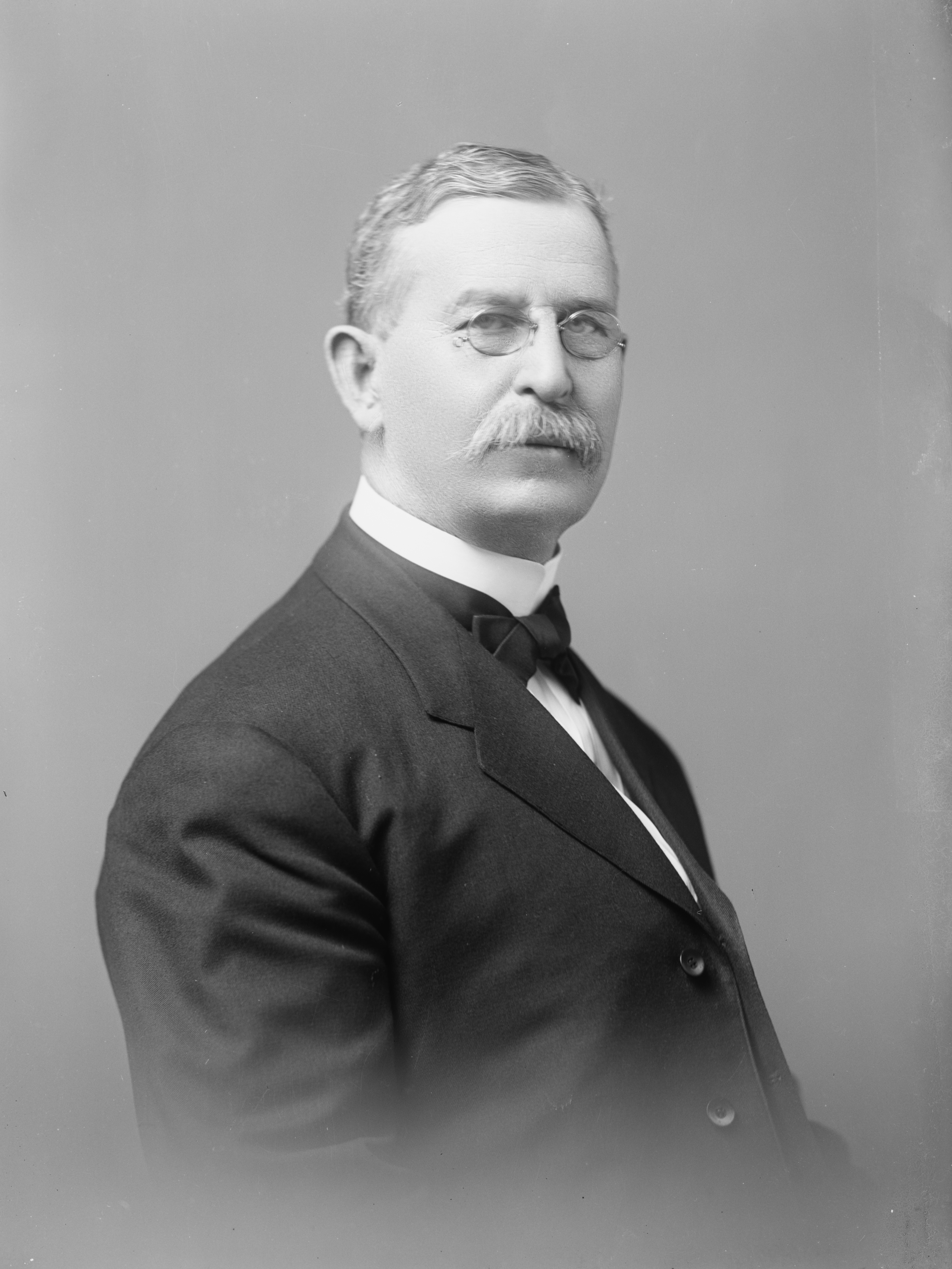
Nominee	Phillips Lee Goldsborough	Thomas Alexander Smith
Party	Republican	Democratic
Popular vote	121,173	114,064
Percentage	50.10%	47.17%
- County results Goldsborough: 40–50% 50–60% Smith: 40–50% 50–60%
Comptroller before election
Robert Patterson Graham
Republican
Elected Comptroller
Phillips Lee Goldsborough
Republican

The 1897 Maryland comptroller election was held on November 2, 1897, in order to elect the comptroller of Maryland. Republican nominee Phillips Lee Goldsborough defeated Democratic nominee and incumbent member of the Maryland Senate Thomas Alexander Smith, Prohibition nominee James W. Frizzell and Socialist Labor nominee William Whipkey. As of 2022, this is the last time that a Republican was elected as the Comptroller of Maryland.

== General election ==
On election day, November 2, 1897, Republican nominee Phillips Lee Goldsborough won the election by a margin of 7,109 votes against his foremost opponent Democratic nominee Thomas Alexander Smith, thereby retaining Republican control over the office of comptroller. Goldsborough was sworn in as the 17th comptroller of Maryland on January 17, 1898.

=== Results ===
Maryland Comptroller election, 1897
Party	Candidate	Votes	%
Republican	Phillips Lee Goldsborough	121,173	50.10
Democratic	Thomas Alexander Smith	114,064	47.17
Prohibition	James W. Frizzell	6,096	2.52
Socialist Labor	William Whipkey	508	0.21
Total votes		241,841	100.00
Republican hold			
