= Christopher Dock =

Mennonite schoolmaster and farmer from Pennsylvania

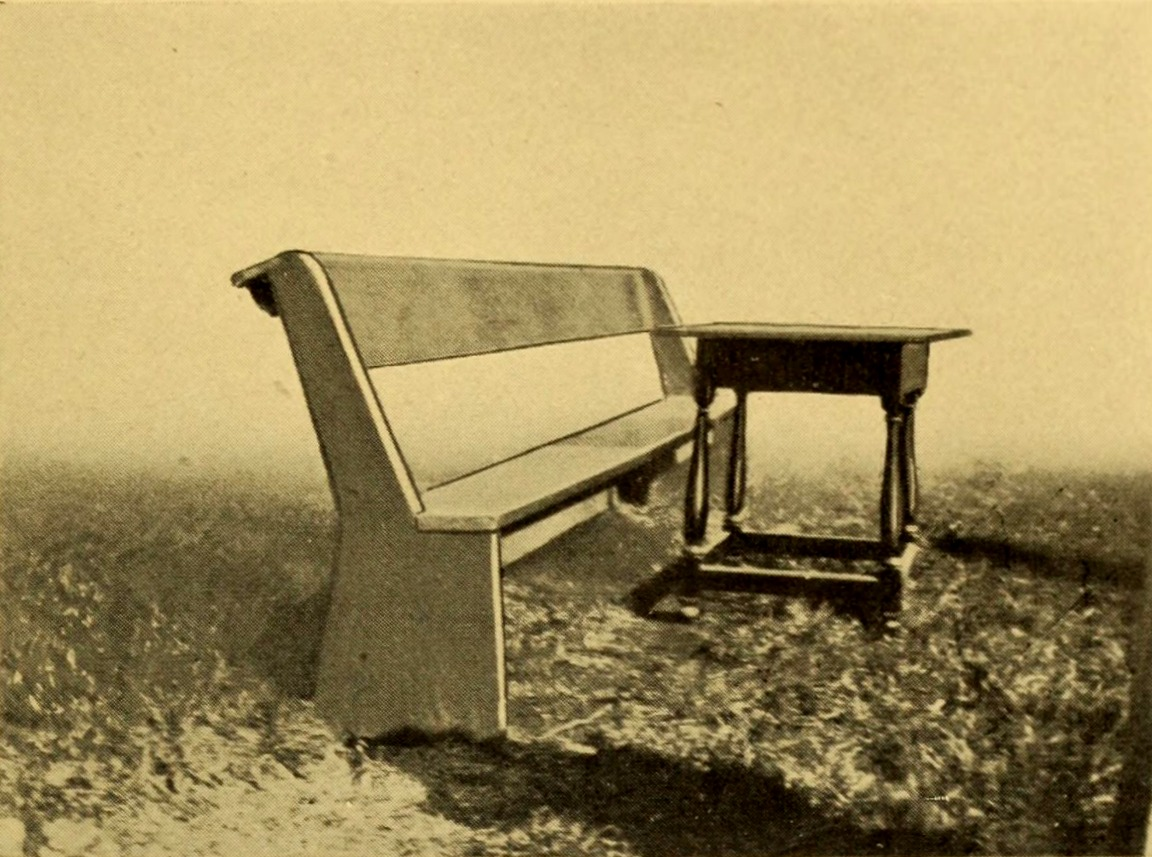
Bench and desk from the Germantown school of Christopher Dock

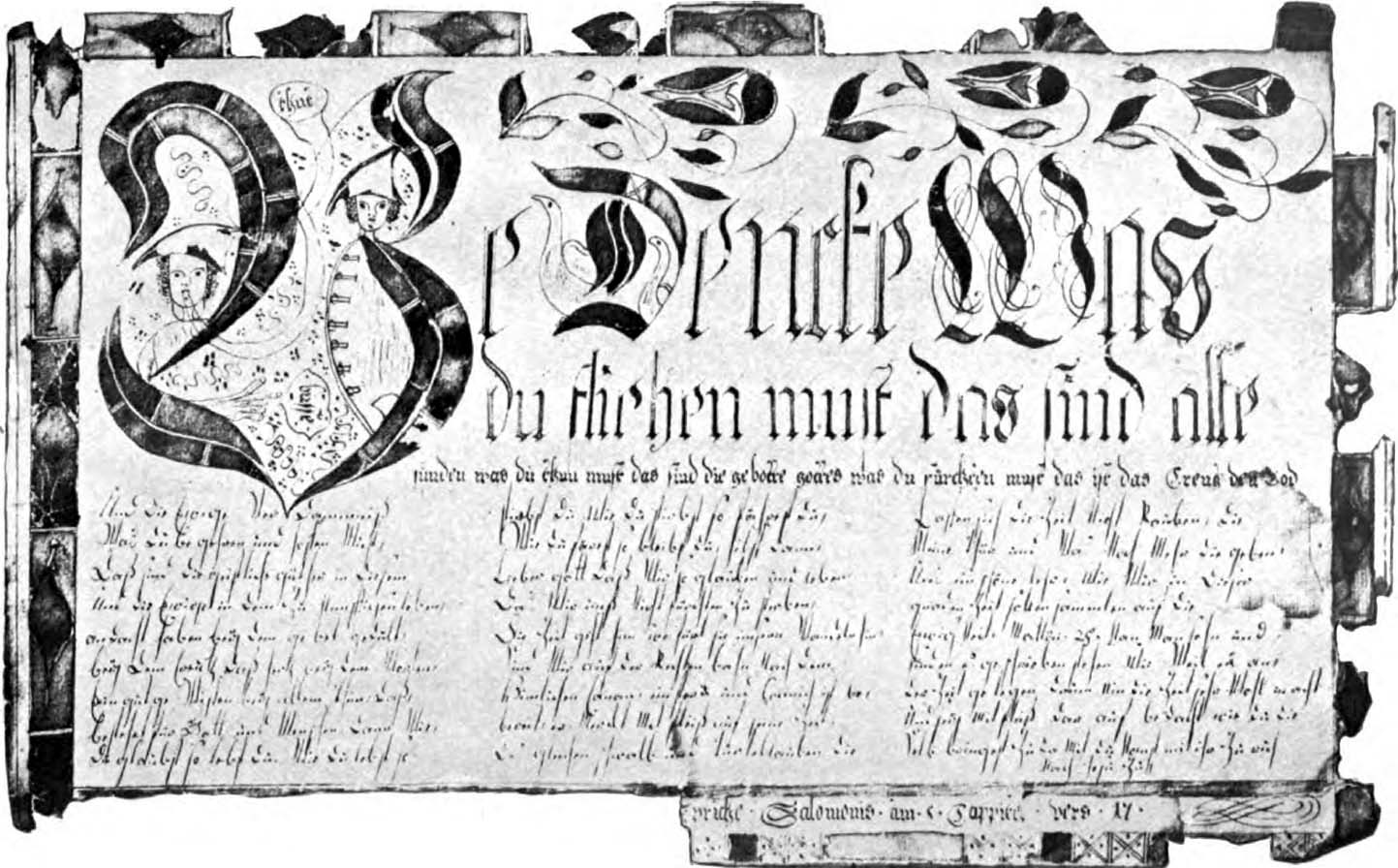
Fraktur by Christopher Dock

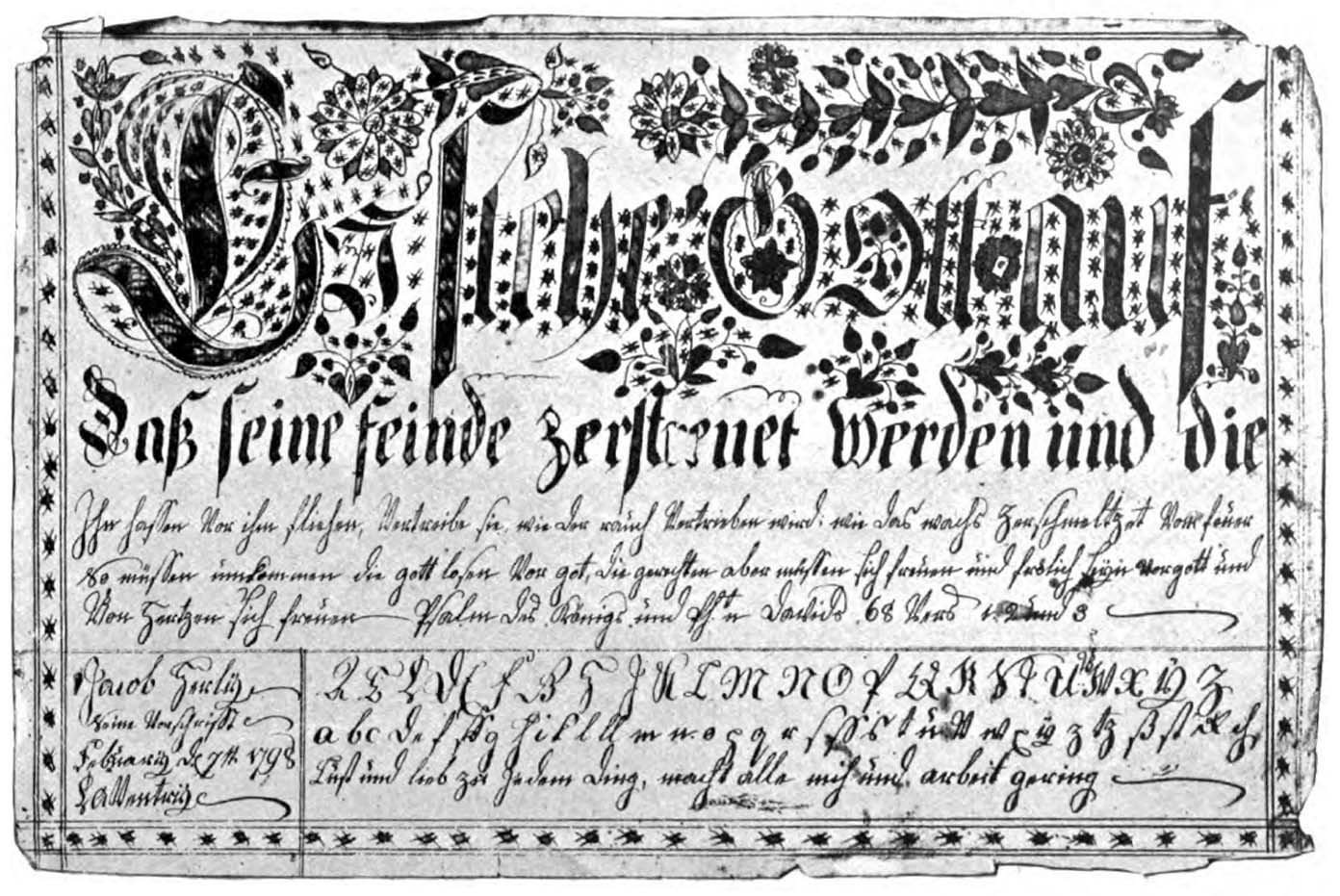
Schrift by Jacob Harley (student of Christopher Dock)

Christopher Dock (c.1698—1771) was a Mennonite educator who worked primarily in South-East Pennsylvania. His teaching techniques stood in contrast to the norm of the day, and emphasized character building and discussion in lieu of physical punishment. His legacy lives on in the Christopher Dock Mennonite High School, which bears his name.

== Biography ==
He immigrated to the United States by 1714, becoming a teacher at Skippack in Philadelphia County, Pennsylvania (present-day Montgomery County, Pennsylvania) by 1718. After teaching for ten years, he turned primarily to farming, and bought 100 acres (0.40 km^{2}) in Salford Township in 1735. Three years later, he returned to teaching and continued as a schoolmaster until his death late in 1771, when he failed to return home from the Skippack school. He was found there on his knees, where it had been his habit to pray for his students.

He wrote, in German, the earliest known teaching methods text in the U.S., Schul-Ordnung (School Management), a book on general pedagogy. The book was completed on August 8, 1750, but was not published until 1769. It was written through the efforts of Christopher Saur of Germantown, a printer whose son Christopher was a student of Dock's. He was so impressed with Dock's teaching style, which was becoming well known, that he asked him to write a guide so that others who taught children could benefit as well. Saur's son printed and published the guide.

== Methods ==
Contrary to the harsh methods common in some colonial schools, Dock preferred to use gentler techniques. He sought to build character in his students, using persuasion, discussion, and positive peer pressure to encourage the highest standards of behavior among them. He disciplined poor behavior and attitudes with thoughtfulness and understanding, seeking to make the punishment suitable to the student as well as to the infraction being addressed.

Dock was a practitioner of fraktur, the Pennsylvania Dutch folk art named after the fraktur typeface. Christopher Dock gave his students little illustrations of a bird or a flower, as well as "Vorschriften" (writing lessons), as rewards.

== Legacy ==
The Christopher Dock Mennonite High School, in Lansdale, Pennsylvania, is named for him.

== Notes ==
- "Christopher Dock." American Eras, Volume 3: The Revolutionary Era, 1754-1783. Gale Research, 1998. Reproduced in Biography Resource Center. Farmington Hills, Michigan: Gale, 2008 Document Number: K2438000307
- Thomas Woody (1930). "Dock, Christopher". Dictionary of American Biography. New York: Charles Scribner's Sons. Reprinted as Dictionary of American Biography Base Set, Biography Resource Center, Farmington Hills, Michigan: Gale, 2008.
