= Richard Druckenbrod =

Richard Druckenbrod (May 29, 1929 — October 27, 2003) was a 20th century Pennsylvania German language teacher, historian, pastor, and writer.

== Early life and education ==
Druckenbrod was born in Reading, Pennsylvania, on May 29, 1929, the son of Harry Eberly Druckenbrod and Kathryn (Reisch) Druckenbrod. He graduated from Denver High School in Denver, Pennsylvania in 1947, and then from Franklin and Marshall College in Lancaster.

In 1951, he was awarded a Fulbright Scholarship to study at the University of Graz in Austria. Returning from Austria, he studied at Lancaster Theological Seminary and was ordained by the United Church of Christ in 1954.

== Career ==
Druckenbrod served as president of the Pennsylvania German Society from 1980 to 1992 and authored the column, "Es Deitsch Schtick," in The Morning Call newspaper in Allentown, Pennsylvania from February 13, 1978 to July 29, 1985.

A frequent preacher at church services in the Pennsylvania German dialect and a speaker at Fersommling gatherings, Druckenbrod's dialect pseudonym was Pit Schweffelbrenner. His final major appointment as pastor was at St. John's United Church of Christ in Howertown, where he served until 1980. He continued his ministry through subsequent appointments as an interim and supply pastor for nearly two additional decades, ultimately retiring in 1998.

He also worked as a professor of theology at Cedar Crest College in Allentown and as a professor in the Chemistry Department at Franklin & Marshall College in Lancaster, Pennsylvania.

=== Awards and other honors ===
In 1991, Druckenbrod was recognized by the Commonwealth of Pennsylvania for his efforts to revitalize Pennsylvania German history.

== Death ==
Druckenbrod died at Lehigh Valley Hospital–Cedar Crest in Allentown, Pennsylvania, on October 27, 2003, at age 74. His wife, Norma Jane, preceded him in death in 1991. They were the parents of one son.

== Bibliography ==
- Mir Schwetz Deitsch: A Guide for Learning the Skills of Reading, Writing and Speaking Pennsylvania German (1977)
- Mir Lanne Deitsch: A Guide for Learning the Skills of Reading, Writing and Speaking Pennsylvania German (1981, 1997)
- Earl C. Haag, A Pennsylvania German Anthology (1988) ISBN 9780941664295
