= Dock Mennonite Academy =

Coordinates: 40.2547°N 75.3358°W

Information
- Former names: Christopher Dock Mennonite High School; Penn View Christian School

Dock Mennonite Academy, formerly known as Christopher Dock Mennonite High School and Penn View Christian School is a private school in Montgomery County. The school was named after schoolmaster Christopher Dock of Skippack, Pennsylvania. Students come from Mennonite backgrounds, other Christian denominations, non-religious households, and international communities.

== Structure ==
Dock Mennonite Academy operates two campuses: • Early Childhood to Grade Eight Campus: Located in Souderton, this campus offers education from early childhood through eighth grade. • Grades Nine to Twelve Campus: Situated in Lansdale, this campus provides high school education.

The academy emphasizes a balanced integration of faith and learning, aiming to develop students who are confident thinkers leading lives of purpose.

== History ==
Penn View Christian School

Established in 1945 as Franconia Mennonite School, Penn View Christian School was founded to provide an alternative to public education, focusing on Mennonite faith and values. Over the years, the school expanded its reach, welcoming students from various Christian denominations who sought a Christ-centered educational environment.

Opened in 1954, Christopher Dock Mennonite High School was named after the 18th-century Mennonite educator Christopher Dock, known for his holistic teaching approach that emphasized character development and gentle discipline. The high school aimed to prepare students for lives of faith and service.

In 2015, the boards of Penn View Christian School and Christopher Dock Mennonite High School approved a merger to form Dock Mennonite Academy. This unification aimed to provide a continuous Christ-centered education from early childhood through high school.
