= William S. Troxell =

William Stahley Troxell (June 11, 1893 – August 10, 1957) was an American writer in the Pennsylvania German language. Born in Rising Sun, Pennsylvania, Troxell's dialect pseudonym was Pumpernickel Bill. He was an author of frequent dialect columns in the Allentown Call-Chronicle (later The Morning Call) newspaper from 1925 to 1955 and served as president of the Pennsylvania German Society from 1952 to 1957. Troxell was a popular teacher of Pennsylvania German, as well as a prolific author of poems, pageants, and radio shows. He was a graduate of Kutztown State Teachers College and Muhlenberg College.

Troxell, a member of the German Reformed Church, died in Allentown and is buried at Neffs Union Cemetery in Neffs, Pennsylvania. He was a member of the Lehigh County Historical Society and the National Society of Sons of the American Revolution. Troxell was a founder of the Grundsau Lodge movement and its fersommlings as well as an early supporter of the Kutztown Folk Festival.

== Bibliography ==
- Alta Neiyohrs Winscha fom Pumpernickle Bill (1933)
- Aus Pennsylfawnia: An Anthology of Translations into the Pennsylvania German Dialect (University of Pennsylvania Press, 1938, 1949)
- J. William Frey, A Morphological and Syntactical Study of the Pennsylvania German Dialect of Pumpernickle Bill (M.A. Thesis, University of Illinois, 1939; typewritten).
- J. William Frey, Supplement to a Morphological and Syntactical Study of the Pennsylvania-German Dialect of Pumpernickle Bill (1939)
- (with Thomas Brendle), The Pennsylvania Dutch Folk Tales (1944)
