= German-Pennsylvanian Association =

- Deutsch-Pennsylvanischer Arbeitskreis
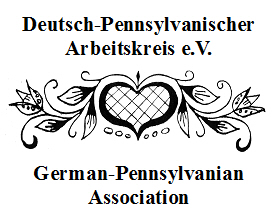
- Formation: May 31, 2003; 22 years ago
- Purpose: Promotion of linguistic, cultural and historical contacts between Germans and Pennsylvania Germans
- Headquarters: Mainz, Germany
- Chairman: Frank Kessler
- Director: Michael Werner
- Website: https://dpak.wordpress.com

The German-Pennsylvanian Association (German: Deutsch-Pennsylvanischer Arbeitskreis) is an organization founded in 2003 in the Rheinhessen area of Ober-Olm in Germany, dedicated to cultural exchange and research involving the Pennsylvania Dutch language and people. The registered seat of the organization is in the Rhineland-Palatinate capital of Mainz.

== Overview ==
The goals of the organization are to promote cultural exchange between Pennsylvanian (United States) residents of German descent and their main region of origin in Southwest Germany, to encourage the creation of joint initiatives and sister city partnerships, and to promote the study of Pennsylvania Dutch history, language, and culture. Many of the members are linguists and historians, or others from Germany or the United States, who are interested in genealogy and Pennsylvania Dutch culture.

== Executive committee ==
The executive committee is composed of five members elected every three years. The first top chairperson was Dr. Michael Werner, a publishing editor, who established the Pennsylvania German newspaper Hiwwe wie Driwwe and an archive for Pennsylvania Dutch literature in Ober-Olm. He served as president between 2003 and 2010. Since April 2010, Frank Kessler (Brussels) has been the top chairperson of the association.

#	Year	President of the German-Pennsylvanian Association
1.	2003 - 2010	Dr. Michael Werner (Ober-Olm, Germany)
2.	2010 -	Frank Kessler (Brussels, Belgium)

== See also ==
- Pfälzisch language
- Pennsylvania Dutch language
- Pennsylvania German Society
- Hiwwe wie Driwwe
- German-Pennsylvanian Archive
