= Preston Barba =

American lawyer

- Born: April 7, 1883; Hellertown, Pennsylvania, U.S.
- Died: April 11, 1971 (aged 88)

Academic background
- Education: Muhlenberg College (BA); Yale University (MA); University of Pennsylvania (PhD)

Academic work
- Institutions: Muhlenberg College

Preston Albert Barba (April 7, 1883 – April 11, 1971) was a major figure in 20th-century Pennsylvania German linguistics, folklore studies, and social history. He was born in Hellertown, Pennsylvania, and received degrees at Muhlenberg College (B.A. 1906), Yale University (M.A. 1907), and the University of Pennsylvania (Ph.D. 1911). Barba taught at the University of Pennsylvania, Indiana University, and, from 1921 to 1951 as professor and head of the Department of German Language and Literature at Muhlenberg.

Barba married Eleanor Martin (March 29, 1893 – July 14, 1966), a professional artist who collaborated with him on many projects and publications.

Barba wrote a popular section of The Morning Call newspaper ('S Pennsylvaanisch Deitsch Eck, "The Pennsylvania German Corner") in the Pennsylvania German dialect from 1935 to 1969, and developed a standardized German-based orthography with Albert F. Buffington, known as Buffington-Barba or Buffington-Barba-Beam in a later version. Its first major codification was in Buffington and Barba's 1954 A Pennsylvania German Grammar (rev. ed. 1965).

A member of the German Reformed Church and later United Church of Christ, Barba also belonged to the Modern Language Association, the National Society of Sons of the American Revolution, and the Goethe Society of America. He was a board member of the Pennsylvania German Society and the Pennsylvania German Folklore Society.

== Works ==
- The Life and Works of Friedrich Armand Strubberg (1913)
- Balduin Möllhausen: The German Cooper (1914)
- German Lyrics and Ballads from Klopstock to Modern Times (1925, 1937)
- 'S Pennsylvaanisch Deitsch Eck (1935–1969).
- Lewis Miller: Pennsylvania German Folk Artist (1939)
- Frederick Valentine Melsheimer, Father of American Entomology (1945)
- Humorous Tales Told by Contemporary Pennsylvania Germans (1950)
- (with Ann Hark) Pennsylvania Dutch Cookery (1950)
- A Pennsylvania German Grammar (1954, 1963)
- Pennsylvania German Tombstones: A Study in Folk Art (1954)
- They Came to Emmaus (1959)
- The Reichard Collection of Early Pennsylvania German Dialogues and Plays (1962)
- (editor) Snow Hill Cloister (1968)
- Four Pennsylvania German Studies (1970)

== See also ==
- C. Richard Beam
- Elsie Singmaster
- Marion Dexter Learned
- Pennsylvania German Society

== Sources ==
- Simon J. Bronner, Joshua R. Brown, Pennsylvania Germans: An Interpretive Encyclopedia (Johns Hopkins, 2017) ISBN 9781421421384
- Earl C. Haag, A Pennsylvania German Anthology (Susquehanna University Press, 1988) ISBN 9780941664295
