= Helen Schaeffer Huff =

American physicist

- Born: 1883
- Died: January 19, 1913 (aged 29–30); Bryn Mawr, Pennsylvania
- Education: PhD, Bryn Mawr College, 1908

Helen Schaeffer Huff (1883 – January 19, 1913) was an American physicist. She received her PhD in physics from Bryn Mawr College in 1908, with a minor in pure and applied mathematics. Her dissertation was entitled A Study of the Electric Spark in a Magnetic Field.

== Research and education ==
While at Bryn Mawr, Schaeffer Huff studied mathematics with Charlotte Scott. In the 1905–1906 academic year, she visited the University of Göttingen. In Göttingen, Schaeffer Huff attended physics lectures and researched the absorption bands of rare earths when dissolved in various solvents under the supervision of Woldemar Voigt. She published the results of her research with Voigt in Physikalische Zeitschrift.

A Bryn Mawr research fellowship is named in Schaeffer Huff's honor.

== Family ==
Schaeffer Huff's father Nathan C. Schaeffer was a Pennsylvania state superintendent of education. Schaeffer Huff had two brothers and four sisters.

Schaeffer Huff married William B. Huff, a Bryn Mawr physics professor, in August 1908. They had two children, born on December 29, 1912. Their daughter died shortly after birth, and Schaeffer Huff died at her home in Bryn Mawr on January 19, 1913.
