= David L. Valuska =

American historian and author

David Lawrence Valuska (born 1938) is an American historian and author specializing in African American history and Pennsylvania German history. He was president of the Pennsylvania German Society from 2005 to 2009. He was professor of history at Kutztown University of Pennsylvania from 1971 to 2005, where he held the Freyberger Chair in Pennsylvania German Studies. In 2003, he was awarded the Officer's Cross of the Order of Merit of the Federal Republic of Germany for services to the promotion of German culture.

== Works ==
- The Negro in the Union Navy 1861–1865 (1973 dissertation)
- The African American in the Union Navy 1861–1865) (1993) ISBN 9780815310082
- Damn Dutch: Pennsylvania Germans at Gettysburg (2010) ISBN 9780811706742
