= Christopher Sower (younger) =

American writer (1721–1784)

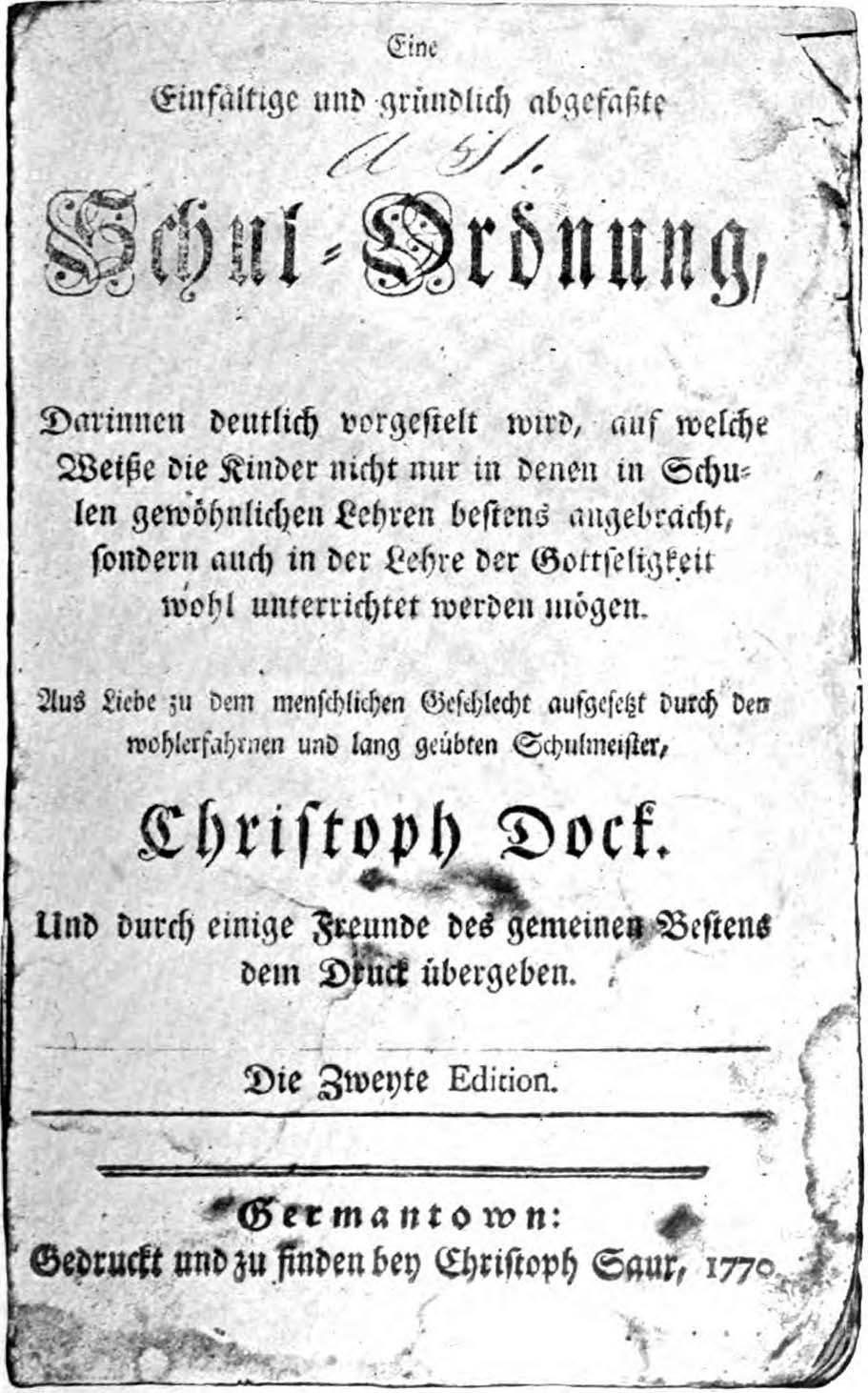
Title page from Christopher Dock's Schul-Ordnung, printed and published by Christopher Sower

Christopher Sower (20 September 1721 in Laasphe, near Marburg, Germany – 4 August 1784 in Methacton, Pennsylvania) was a clergyman and printer.

== Biography ==
His father, also named Christopher Sower (I), had founded a printing and publishing business and other enterprises in Germantown, Pennsylvania, which the son later continued. Christopher Sower II was liberally educated. His early education was by Christopher Dock, whose work “Eine Einfältige und gründlich abgefasste Schul-Ordnung” he later published. Sower learned the printing and publishing trades from his father. When he was 26 years old, he became a minister, and was associated with Sanders Mack in Germantown and the oldest Dunker church in the United States. Five years later, he was chosen overseer, or bishop, and continued the duties of his office in connection with his inherited secular business until his death.

Upon taking charge of the printing and publishing business, he so increased it that for many years it was the largest book manufactory in the country. In 1763, he published a second edition of the great quarto Bible, in 1776 a third, all in German. These editions were issued previous to the publication of the first English Bible in the colonies by Robert Aitken in 1781.

Sower did his own type founding, wood engraving, ink making and book binding. In 1773 he constructed a paper mill on the Schuylkill River. He also managed a large business in his father's medical preparations, which he sent to various parts of the country. Before the American Revolutionary War, he was one of the wealthiest men in the Thirteen Colonies. He was one of the founders of the Germantown Academy, to which he largely contributed. He also was an opponent of slavery.

In 1774, without legal formality, he turned over his house in Germantown and his printing business to his son Christopher. During the American Revolutionary War, when British troops occupied Germantown, part of the unbound sheets for Sower's Bible edition of 1776 was seized and used for littering horses. Though, along with many other German sectarians (these included Quakers, Mennonites, Schwenkfelders, Moravians and his own sect, the Dunkers), Sower was merely a pacifist, his son was an active loyalist, and the Sowers were on the rebels' list of loyalists.

When the British troops departed Philadelphia, the son left with them, but the father stayed behind during the rebel occupation. Though Christopher Sower II did not espouse the British cause, and had actively denounced the Stamp Act which doubly taxed foreign publications, he was arrested and imprisoned. On a second arrest for not conforming to an edict, of which he seems to have been ignorant, he was taken from his bed, maltreated in various ways, and led before the provost as a spy. His considerable property was confiscated, but instead of having recourse to the law, he said: “I made them to understand that I should permit everything to happen to me that the Lord should ordain.” Sower's one protest was against being labeled a traitor.

The remainder of his old age was spent, except when visiting churches within his jurisdiction, at Methacton, where, assisted by his daughter, he supported himself at binding and selling remnants of his publications. He died in poverty. No one in his denomination has been held in higher veneration, and his benevolence to the poor families of the soldiers earned him the title of the “bread father.” He was also an orator, and his reputation as a writer extended throughout the colonies.

== Family ==
He married Catharine Sharpnack in 1751. They had nine children. She died in 1777. In 1888, Christopher the younger's great-grandson Charles Gilbert Sower incorporated the family firm as the Christopher Sower Company with a charter from Pennsylvania.

== See also ==
- Early American publishers and printers
- German American journalism
