= Charles Gilbert Sower =

American printer and publisher

Charles Gilbert Sower (21 November 1821, Norristown, Pennsylvania – 23 March 1902) was a printer and publisher in Philadelphia.

== Biography ==
He was the great grandson of Christopher Sower the younger, and inherited the family printing and publishing operations. He moved the establishment to Philadelphia in 1844, where he continued publishing, first in his own name, then successively as Sower and Barnes, then as Sower, Barnes and Potts, and then as Sower, Potts and Co.

In 1888, 150 years after it was founded by Christopher Sower the elder, the house was incorporated as the Christopher Sower Company by a charter granted by Pennsylvania. In the late 19th century, Charles Gilbert Sower was still president of the company.

Sower, Barnes and Potts published Familiar science, or, The scientific explanation of common things. It was at 87 North Third Street.

== Publishings ==
=== Sower, Potts and Co. ===
- The Normal Educational Series of School and College Textbooks
- Peterson's Familiar Science
- Bouvier's Astronomy
- Hillside's Geology
- Fairbanks's Bookkeeping
- Jarvis's Chiming Bells
- Pelton's Outline Maps

== Additional sources ==
- Wilson, J. G.; Fiske, J., eds. (1900). "Sower, Christopher" . Appletons' Cyclopædia of American Biography. New York: D. Appleton.
