= Arthur D. Graeff =

Arthur Dundore Graeff (September 23, 1899 — March 28, 1969) was an American local historian and author in the Pennsylvania German language. Born in Adamstown, Pennsylvania, he was an alumnus of Franklin & Marshall College in Lancaster. Between 1938 and 1969, Graeff wrote the "Scholla" column three times a week in the Reading Times. Following a long career teaching at Overbrook Senior High School in Philadelphia, he taught at Kutztown University of Pennsylvania, Alvernia College, and in informal Pennsylvania German weekend and night-school classes. Graeff used the dialect pseudonyms Der Dichter vun de Dolpehock and Der Ewich Yeeger. He was president of the Pennsylvania German Society from 1966 to 1969.

Graeff died in Robesonia, Pennsylvania and is buried in Wernersville at St. John's Hains Cemetery.

== Works ==
- Conrad Weiser, Interpreter (1932)
- The Relations between the Pennsylvania Germans and the British Authorities, 1750-1776 (Norristown, 1939)
- "Standardizing Pennsylvania German Orthography" (The Morning Call, 1939)
- American History Visualized in Pennsylvania German Almanacs (1940)
- Old World Backgrounds of American Life (1941)
- (with Ralph Charles Wood), The Pennsylvania Germans (Princeton University Press, 1943)
- Bicentennial of the Union Church of North Heidelberg, 1744-1944 (1944)
- Conrad Weiser, Pennsylvania Peacemaker (1945)
- Lebanon County through the Centuries: An Appreciation (1945)
- It Happened in Pennsylvania (1947)
- Industrial Berks County 1748-1948: Presented to the People of Reading and Berks County on the Occasion of the Two Hundredth Anniversary of the City of Reading (1948)
- The Pennsylvania Germans in Ontario, Canada (1948)
- Transplants of Pennsylvania Indian Nations in Ontario (1948)
- The Constitution of Pennsylvania (1949)
- A History of Steel Casting (1949)
- 50 Years: Womelsdorf Bank and Trust Company (1953)
- The Keystone State: Geography, History, Government (1953)
- Collection of Original Documents Selected from the Public Record Office Relating to the Palatine Immigration: Original Documents Selected for Filming from the Colonial Office and Treasury Papers (1954)
- The Rittenhouse Line (1956)
- A Visitor's Guide to Berks County (1964)
- Selections from Arthur Graeff's "Scholla" (1971)
- Echoes of "Scholla" Illustrated: Choice Bits of Berks County History and Lore (1976)
- Henry Vanderslice, Wagon-master, 1777-1778 (no date)
