= William Humphreys Jackson =

American politician

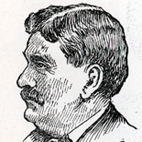

Member of the U.S. House of Representatives from Maryland's 1st district
- In office March 4, 1907 – March 3, 1909
- Preceded by: Thomas Alexander Smith
- Succeeded by: James Harry Covington
- In office March 4, 1901 – March 3, 1905
- Preceded by: Josiah Kerr
- Succeeded by: Thomas Alexander Smith

Personal details
- Born: October 15, 1839 Salisbury, Maryland
- Died: April 3, 1915 (aged 75) Salisbury, Maryland
- Resting place: Parsons Cemetery; Salisbury, Maryland
- Party: Republican

William Humphreys Jackson (October 15, 1839 – April 3, 1915) represented Maryland's 1st congressional district in the United States House of Representatives from 1901 to 1905 and from 1907 to 1909. His son, William P. Jackson, was a U.S. Senator from Maryland.

Jackson was born near Salisbury, Maryland, and engaged in agricultural pursuits. In 1864, he engaged in the manufacture of lumber in Salisbury, and was elected as a Republican to Congress from Maryland's 1st congressional district, serving two full terms from March 4, 1901, to March 3, 1905. He was an unsuccessful candidate for reelection in 1904, but was successful two years later in 1906, serving another term for the 1st district from March 4, 1907, to March 3, 1909. He was again an unsuccessful candidate for reelection in 1908, and resumed lumber manufacturing in Salisbury. He died in Salisbury, and is interred in Parsons Cemetery.

In 1900, Jackson struck a train conductor, Charles Renniger, in the arm with his cane causing creeping paralysis in his arm. Renniger wanted to sue Jackson, but was advised by friends of both men to try to work it out and the time limit to sue ran our. On 22 August 1902, Renniger died from the injury, but Jackson was never charged.

U.S. House of Representatives
Preceded by Josiah Kerr	Member of the U.S. House of Representatives from Maryland's 1st congressional district 1901–1905	Succeeded by Thomas Alexander Smith
Preceded by Thomas Alexander Smith	Member of the U.S. House of Representatives from Maryland's 1st congressional district 1907–1909	Succeeded by James Harry Covington
