= German-Pennsylvanian Archive =

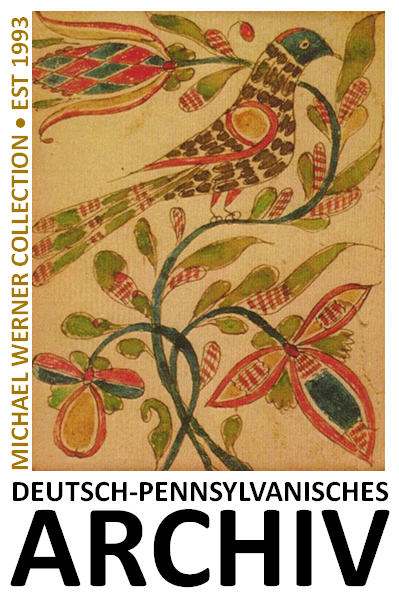
Deutsch-Pennsylvanisches Arciv (Logo 2016)

The German-Pennsylvanian Archive (Deutsch-Pennsylvanisches Archiv) is a collection of books, manuscripts, audio files, etc. about the Pennsylvania German language and culture. The archive is located in the Palatinate, Germany. It was founded in 1993 in Ludwigshafen am Rhein by Michael Werner, publisher of the Pennsylvania German newspaper Hiwwe wie Driwwe. It was moved to Ebertsheim in 1996 and to Ober-Olm in 2000. The archive is a member of the German-Pennsylvanian Association (Deutsch-Pennsylvanischer Arbeitskreis e.V.) in Germany. In 2017, the German-Pennsylvanian Archive was donated to the "Mennonite Research Center" (Mennonitische Forschungsstelle) at Weierhof, Palatinate (Germany). Actually, the archive consists of about 1,500 books and more than 16,000 texts of Pennsylvania German prose and poetry. Additionally, the archive holds a collection of about 800 Pennsylvania German groundhog lodge stories. At the new location, the collection is open to the public.

#	Year	Director of the German-Pennsylvanian Archive
1.	1993 - 2017	Michael Werner (Ober-Olm)
2.	2017 - 2023	Astrid von Schlachta (Weierhof), Michael Werner
3.	2023 -	Astrid von Schlachta (Weierhof)
