= Mahlon Hellerich =

American historian

Mahlon Howard Hellerich (January 20, 1919 – January 17, 2010) was an American Lutheran local historian and president of the Pennsylvania German Society from 1973 to 1979. He was also executive director of the Lehigh County Historical Society from 1974 to 1976.

Hellerich attended Muhlenberg College in Allentown, Pennsylvania, where he graduated as valedictorian in 1940. He went on to receive his M.A. at Columbia University (1947) and Ph.D. from the University of Pennsylvania in 1957. He was academic dean of Albright College in Reading, Pennsylvania, from 1959 to 1966.

== Death ==
Hellerich died in Allentown, Pennsylvania, on January 17, 2010.

== Works ==
- Lehigh Heritage (1979)
- Allentown 1762-1987: A 225 Year History (1987)
- A Journey of Faith: Brief Histories of Bethlehem's Religious Communities (1992)
- (editor) Proceedings of the Lehigh County Historical Society
