= Julius F. Sachse =

American scholar (1842–1919)

Julius Friedrich (Frederick) Adolph Sachse (November 22, 1842 – November 15, 1919) was an American scholar of the history of Pennsylvania, particularly of the Ephrata Cloister and sectarian Pennsylvania German groups, as well as of American Freemasonry, and photographer. He was born in Philadelphia and graduated from Muhlenberg College. He was elected to the American Philosophical Society in 1894. He was editor of the American Journal of Photography from 1890 to 1897. Although raised a Lutheran, Sachse's children were baptized in the German Reformed Church, and he attended Episcopal churches in Philadelphia from about 1895 until his death.

Sachse was president of the Pennsylvania German Society for 1914 and belonged to a large number of American and European historical and social organizations. He died in Philadelphia and is buried at West Laurel Hill Cemetery in Bala Cynwyd, Pennsylvania.

== Works ==
- "The Legend about Duffy's Cut on the Pennsylvania Railroad between Malvern and Frazer," Village Record (May 5, 1889)
- "The Silhouette," American Journal of Photography (1890)
- The True Heroes of Provincial Pennsylvania: A Paper Read before the Pennsylvania-German Society at Mount Gretna, July 18, 1892 (1892)
- Philadelphia's Share in the Development of Photography (1893)
- Benjamin Furly, "an English Merchant at Rotterdam" Who Promoted the First German Emigration to America (1895)
- The German Pietists of Provincial Pennsylvania 1694-1708 (1895)
- Horologium Achaz, Christophorus Schissler, Artifex: A paper Read before the American Philosophical Society, February 1, 1895 (1895)
- The Monument on Zion Hill: An Address Delivered at Ephrata, Lancaster County, Pa., on Patriots' Day, Wednesday, September 11, 1895 (1895)
- The Joly Process of Color Photography (1896)
- A Photographic Ramble in the Millbach Valley (1896)
- "Roster of the Lodge of Free and Accepted Masons Which Met at the Tun Tavern, Philadelphia," The Philadelphia Magazine of History and Biography (1896)
- "The Ephrata Paper Mill," Papers Read before the Lancaster County Historical Society (1897)
- The Fatherland, (1450-1700): Showing the Part It Bore in the Discovery, Exploration and Development of the Western Continent (1897)
- A German Poem of Frederick Augustus Mühlenberg (1897)
- (translator) The Missive of Justus Falckner, of Germantown, Concerning the Religious Condition of Pennsylvania in the Year 1701 (1897)
- "Title Pages of Books and Pamphlets That Influenced German Emigration to Pennsylvania," Pennsylvania German Society Proceedings and Addresses (1897)
- A Form of Prayer Issued by Special Command of His Majesty George III, London, 1776 Imploring Divine Assistance against the King's Unhappy Deluded Subjects in America, Now in Open Rebellion against the Crown in the Collection of the American Philosophical Society Held at Philadelphia for Promoting Useful Knowledge (1898)
- An Old Broadside, with a Reference to the Throne of Congress (1898)
- Franklin's Account with the "Lodge of Masons" 1731-1737, as Found upon the Pages of His Daily Journal: Read before the Right Worshipful Grand Lodge F. and A. M. of Pennsylvania at the Annual Grand Communication Held at Philadelphia, December 27, 1898 (1899)
- The German Sectarians of Pennsylvania: A Critical and Legendary History of the Ephrata Cloister and the Dunkers (1899)
- The First German Newspaper Published in America: A Historical Sketch with a Fac-simile of the Only Known Copy (1900)
- The Religious and Social Conditions of Philadelphia during the first decade under the Federal Constitution, 1790-1800 (1900)
- Justus Falckner, Mystic and Scholar, Devout Pietist in Germany, Hermit on the Wissahickon, Missionary on the Hudson: A Bi-Centennial Memorial of the First Regular Ordination of an Orthodox pastor in America, Done November 24, 1703, at Gloria Dei, the Swedish Lutheran Church at Wicaco, Philadelphia (1903)
- The Music of the Ephrata Cloister: Also Conrad Beissel's Treatise on Music as Set Forth in a Preface to the "Turtel taube" of 1747, Amplified with Fac-simile Reproductions of Parts of the Text and Some Original Ephrata Music of the Weyrauchs Hügel, 1739; Rosen und Lilien, 1745; Turtel Taube, 1747; Choral Buch, 1754, etc. (1903)
- Falckner's "Curieuse Nachricht von Pennsylvania," the Book That Stimulated the Great German Emigration to Pennsylvania in the Early Years of the XVIII Century (1905)
- The Wreck of the Ship New Era upon the New Jersey Coast, November 13, 1854 (1905)
- Benjamin Franklin as a Free Mason (1906)
- "The Masonic Chronology of Benjamin Franklin," The Pennsylvania Magazine of History and Biography (1906)
- "Roster of the Freemason's Lodge Philadelphia No. 2, of the Moderns," The Pennsylvania Magazine of History and Biography (1907)
- Freemasonry in Pennsylvania, 1727-1907 (1908)
- Diary of a Voyage from Rotterdam to Philadelphia in 1728 (1909)
- Old Masonic Lodges of Pennsylvania: "Moderns" and "Ancients" 1730-1800, Which Have Surrendered Their Warrants or Affiliated with Other Grand Lodges, Compiled from Original Records in the Archives of the R. W. Grand Lodge, R. & A.M. of Pennsylvania, under the Direction of the Committee on Library (1912)
  - volume one
  - volume two
- A Unique Manuscript by Rev. Peter Miller (Brother Jabez) Prior of the Ephrata Community, in Lancaster County, Pennsylvania, written for Benjamin Franklin, together with a Fac-simile and Translation of Beissel's 99 Mystical Proverbs, Originally Printed by Benjamin Franklin in 1730 (1912)
- Ancient Documents Relating to the A. and A. Scottish Rite in the Archives of the R.W. Grand Lodge of Free and Accepted Masons of Pennsylvania (1915)
- Washington's Masonic Correspondence as Found among the Washington Papers in the Library of Congress (1915)
- The Wayside Inns on the Lancaster Roadside Between Philadelphia and Lancaster (1915)
- Historical Sketch of Columbia Lodge, No. 91 F. & A. M., Read at the State Meeting Held Monday, October 23, 1916, Celebrating the One Hundred Fifteenth Anniversary, Also the Golden Masonic Jubilee 1866-1916 (1916)
- The History of Brother General Lafayette's Fraternal Connections with the R.W. Grand Lodge, F. & A.M., of Pennsylvania (1916)
- The Diarium of Magister Johannes Kelpius (1917)
