= John Henry Miller (printer) =

American printer and publisher

John Henry Miller (1702 Waldeck, Germany – 31 March 1782 (sometimes only referred to as Henry Miller) Bethlehem, Pennsylvania) was a printer and publisher who worked in the Thirteen Colonies, most notably for Benjamin Franklin and William Bradford.

Miller was born in the principality of Waldeck in Germany on the Upper Rhine, March 12, 1702, where his parents then resided. He came to America and was employed by Benjamin Franklin and William Bradford to superintend their German printing as a translator of German into English. He published the Gazette of Lancaster, Pennsylvania, in 1752, and from 1762 to 1779 Der Wöchentliche Philadelphische Staatsbote. He did a large business throughout the colonies in printing almanacs, laws, school books, and the classics, and in reprinting English and German works.

== See also ==
- Early American publishers and printers
- German American journalism
- List of early American publishers and printers
