= Thomas Alexander Smith =

American politician (1850–1932)

Thomas A. Smith
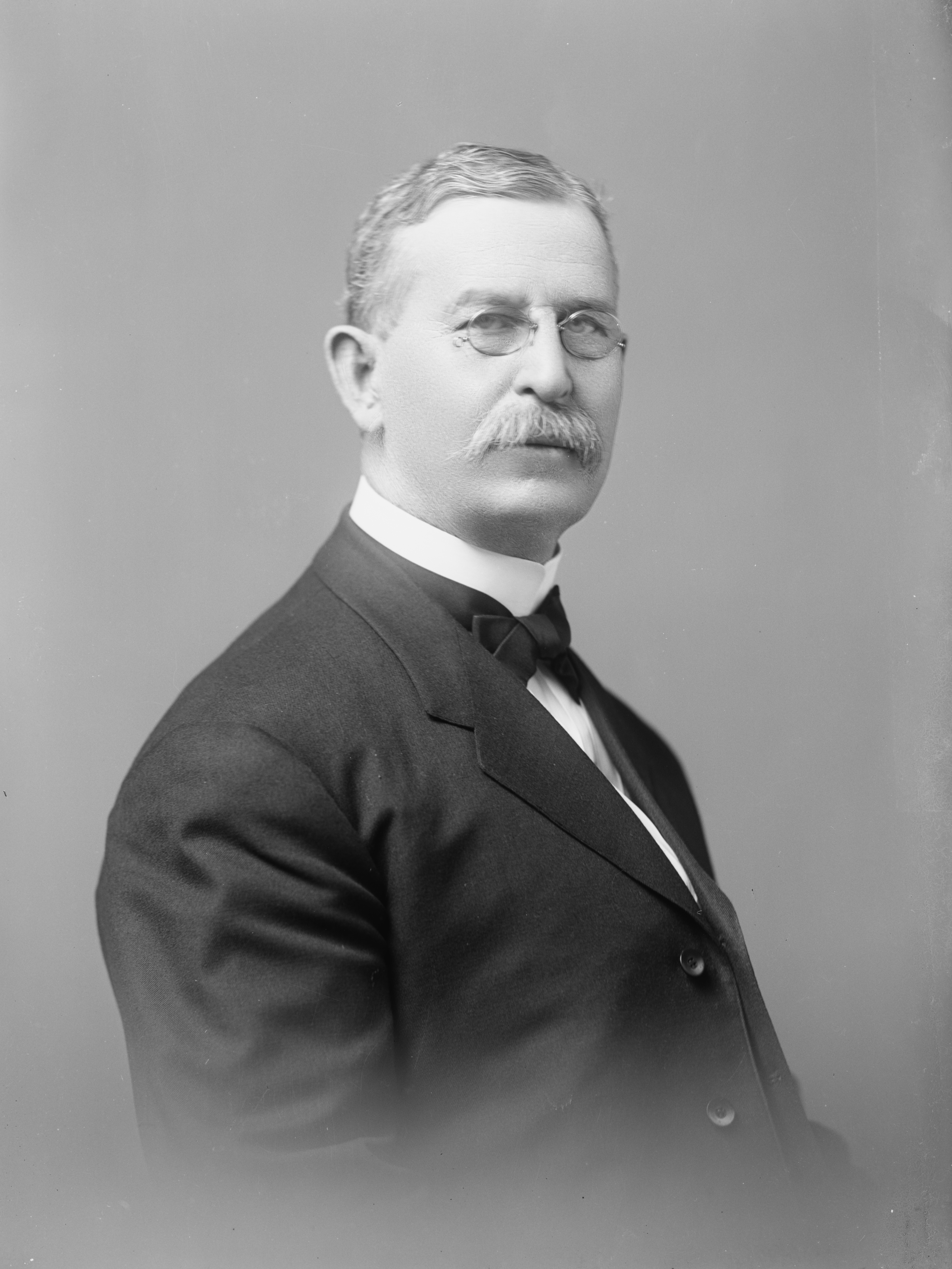
- Smith, c. 1905

Member of the U.S. House of Representatives from Maryland's 1st district
- In office March 4, 1905 – March 3, 1907
- Preceded by: William Humphreys Jackson
- Succeeded by: William Humphreys Jackson

Member of the Maryland Senate
- In office 1894–1898

Personal details
- Born: September 3, 1850 Greenwood, Delaware, U.S.
- Died: May 1, 1932 (aged 81) Newark, Delaware, U.S.
- Resting place: Denton Cemetery
- Party: Democratic
- Spouse: Adah Clayton Frazer (m. 1878)
- Children: 4

Thomas Alexander Smith (September 3, 1850 – May 1, 1932) was an American politician who was a member of the Maryland State Senate and represented the 1st congressional district of Maryland in the United States House of Representatives from 1905 to 1907.

== Early life ==
Thomas Alexander Smith was born near Greenwood, Delaware, and moved with his parents to Ridgely, Maryland, as a youth in 1856. He attended the public schools and Denton Academy, and taught school in Delaware, Maryland, and Michigan. He returned to Ridgely, where he was postmaster from August 4, 1885, to November 25, 1889. He engaged in the mercantile business, and was a member of the board of school commissioners for Caroline County, Maryland, from 1889 to 1893.

== Career ==
In 1894 and 1896, Smith served as a member of the Maryland Senate, and was chief of the Maryland Bureau of Statistics and Information from 1900 to 1904. He was the first vice president of the National Association of Labor Statisticians in 1903 and 1904, and member of the board of State aid and charities in 1904 and 1905. He was one of the founders of the Bank of Ridgely, and served as its first president.

Smith was elected as a Democrat to Congress in 1904, serving the 1st Congressional district for one full term from March 4, 1905 to March 3, 1907, but was an unsuccessful candidate for reelection in 1906. He later served as a delegate to the Farmers’ National Congress of the United States held at Madison, Wisconsin, in 1908 and at Lincoln, Nebraska, in 1910. He was also land commissioner of Maryland from 1908 to 1912, internal revenue agent for the district of Maryland from January 1, 1920, to 1922.

== Personal life ==
Smith married Adah Clayton Frazer of Detroit, Michigan on September 10, 1878. They had four children, including Alice Anita, Elsie Silvester and Thomas A. Smith Jr.

Smith died in Newark, Delaware, and is interred in Denton Cemetery.

U.S. House of Representatives
Preceded by William Humphreys Jackson	Member of the U.S. House of Representatives from Maryland's 1st congressional district 1905–1907	Succeeded by William Humphreys Jackson
