= Nathan C. Schaeffer =

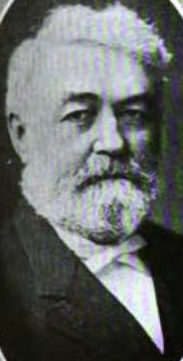
- Born: Nathan Christ Schaeffer; February 3, 1849; Maxatawny Township, Berks County, Pennsylvania
- Died: March 15, 1919 (aged 70); Lancaster, Pennsylvania
- Education: Franklin and Marshall College
- Occupation(s): Clergyman, educator

Nathan Christ Schaeffer (February 3, 1849 – March 15, 1919) was a United States clergyman and educator.

== Biography ==
Nathan C. Schaeffer was born in Maxatawny, Pennsylvania on February 3, 1849. In 1867 he graduated from Franklin and Marshall College, after which he studied divinity at the Theological Seminary of the Reformed Church, and finished his education at the universities of Berlin, Tübingen and Leipzig. From 1875 to 1877, Schaeffer was professor at Franklin and Marshall College and from 1877 to 1893 was principal of the Keystone State Normal School at Kutztown, Pennsylvania. In 1893 he became superintendent of public instruction for Pennsylvania, a post he held until his death. He also served as president of the Pennsylvania board of education and was president of a commission that prepared a new school code for the state, and was a member of the Simplified Spelling Board.

In 1902, he became a member of the board of trustees for Franklin and Marshall College. He was offered the presidency of the college, but declined it. In 1879 he received the degree of doctor of philosophy and in 1904 received the degrees of doctor of divinity and doctor of laws from Dickinson College.

He died at his home in Lancaster, Pennsylvania on March 15, 1919.

Schaeffer's daughter Helen Schaeffer Huff earned a PhD in physics from Bryn Mawr College.

== Publications ==
He was a prolific writer on educational and religious subjects. His works include:

- Thinking and Learning to Think (1900)
- History of Education in Pennsylvania
- Introduction to Hinsdale's Civil Government
- Life of Henry Harbaugh
- “What Can the Schools Do to Aid the Peace Movement?” Proceedings of the National Educational Association (1907): 58-62.

He edited:

- Bible Readings for Schools (1897)
- Riddle's Nicholas Comenius
- Pennsylvania School Journal (after 1893)
