= Fersommling =

Pennsylvania Dutch social event

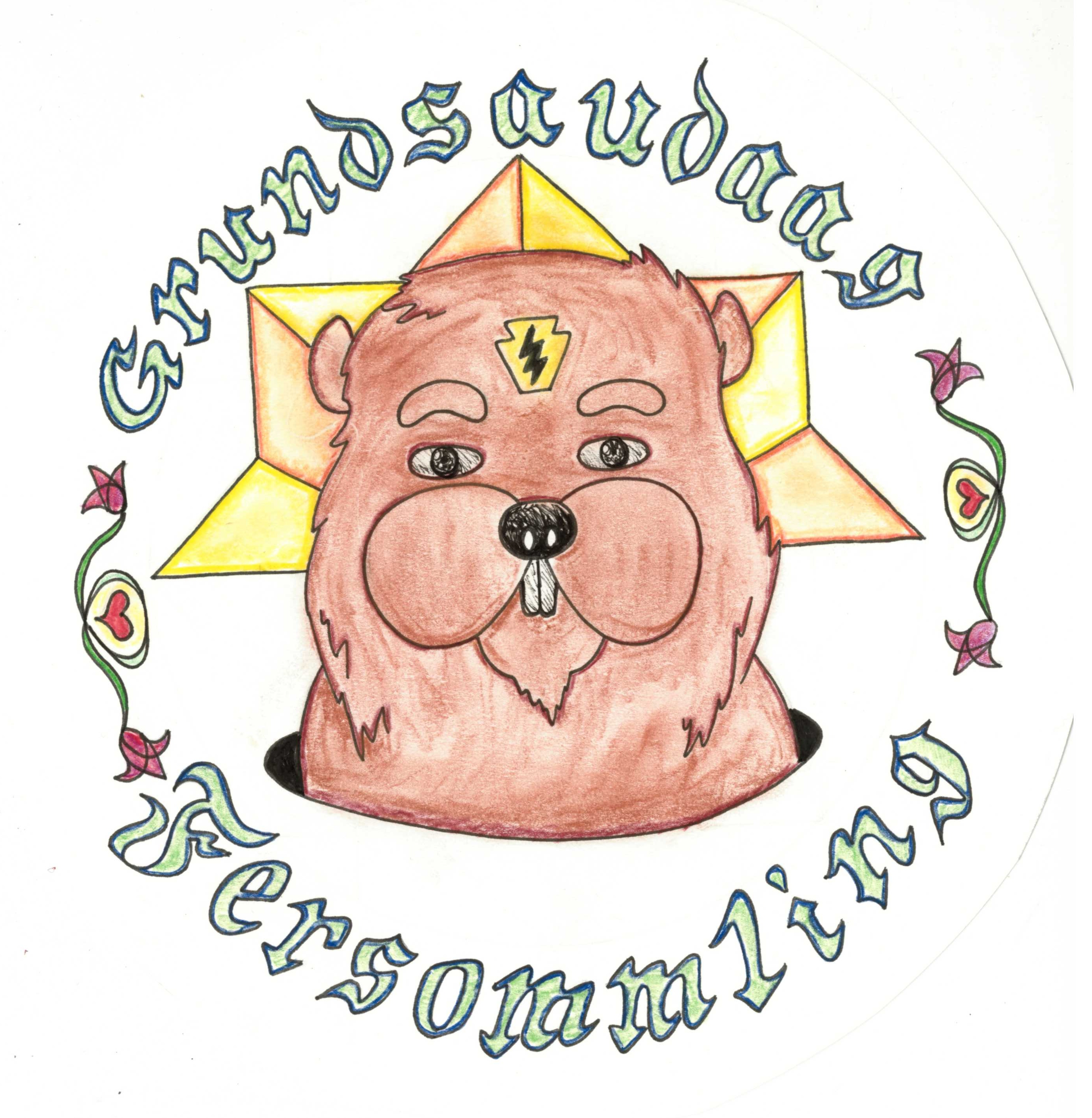
"Grundsaudaag Fersommling", a 2017 illustration and watercolor by Andrew Issermoyer

A Fersommling (plural: Fersommlinge; also spelled Versammling, Versammling, or Fersammling) is a Pennsylvania Dutch social event at which food is served, speeches are given, and one or more g'spiel, or plays and skits, are performed for entertainment. William W. Donner writes that "A high degree of theatricality and ceremony is involved, especially in the groundhog lodges: pledging loyalty to the lodge and the groundhog, listening to a weather report, singing patriotic songs in Deitsch, and ending every meeting by asking God to allow them to keep their way of life and their merriment."

Among these traditions are the singing of the German folk song "Schnitzelbank" and the patriotic "My Country, 'Tis of Thee" in Pennsylvania German, as translated by John Birmelin. Donner also writes, "There is continual creativity, as current events are incorporated into the versammling performances, speeches, and skits."

Fersommlinge are typically attended by the Fancy Dutch, as opposed to the "Plain sects" of the Amish, Brethren, and Mennonites. The term literally means "a congregation", not in the sense of a group of churchgoers, but as a "social gathering of people". Fersommlinge are not religious functions, although many churches and church groups have hosted the events and used them to raise money. The Pennsylvania German dialect is the only language spoken at the event, and those who speak English pay a penalty, usually in the form of a nickel, dime, or quarter per word spoken, placed into a bowl in the center of the table.

Donner summarizes that "The versammlinge which started as a way to celebrate Pennsylvania German heritage and ethnicity became over time part of that heritage and ethnicity."

== History ==
The first Fersommling was held by Dr. John I. Woodruff of Susquehanna University in 1933. Shortly afterward, on 13 March 1933, a second was held in Allentown, Pennsylvania, at the home of William S. Troxell, who wrote a daily column on Pennsylvania German culture for the Morning Call under the pseudonym "Pumpernickle Bill". The purpose of the gathering was to plan the formation of the first Grundsow (Groundhog) Lodge.

The following Groundhog Day, on 2 February 1934, the first Fersommling of Grundsow Lodge Nummer Ains an Da Lechaw (Number One on the Lehigh) was held in Northampton, Pennsylvania.

Fersommlinge continue to be held throughout eastern Pennsylvania as a means of preserving the Pennsylvania German dialect and culture. For example, the Berks County Fersommling, which began in 1937, annually attracts more than 700 participants, most of whom are of Pennsylvania German ancestry.

Since 1997, some of the texts presented at Fersommlinge have also been published in the Pennsylvania German newspaper Hiwwe wie Driwwe. Current information on Fersommlinge and Grundsau lodges is maintained at groundhoglodge.org and by the Pennsylvania German Society.
