= Dunker =

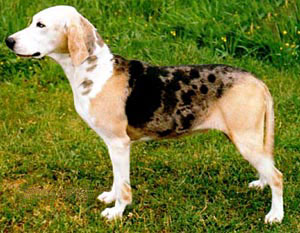
- Other names: Norwegian Hound
- Origin: Norway
Traits
Height	Males	19.5–21.5 inches (50–55 cm)
	Females	18.5–20.5 inches (47–52 cm)
- Weight: 25–39 pounds (11–18 kg)
- Coat: Straight, hard, dense, and not too short
- Color: Black or blue marbled with pale fawn and white markings is most desirable.
Kennel club standards
- Fédération Cynologique Internationale: standard

A Dunker, also known as the Norwegian Hound, is a medium-sized breed of dog from Norway. It was bred by Wilhelm Dunker to be a scenthound by crossing a Russian Harlequin Hound with dependable Norwegian scent hounds.

It is a very rare dog breed, and most Dunkers are found in Norway and Sweden. On average, 150 puppies from the Dunker breed are born each year.

== Appearance ==
The Dunker has a clean, noble, long head with parallel planes of the skull and muzzle, carried low and not wedge-shaped. Its skull is slightly domed with a defined stop and clean cheeks, the muzzle is long and square-cut with a straight and broad nasal bridge, and its teeth are evenly spaced with a scissor-bite. The Dunker has a black nose with wide nostrils, round, large, and dark eyes, and low-set, wide, flat, ears that hang close to the head and to the middle of the muzzle.

The Dunker has a long neck with no throatiness, sloping shoulders, straight forelegs, a level topline, a straight and strong back with broad and muscular loins, and a slight tuck up in the chest. Its hindquarters are well-angulated, as are its stifle, and its thighs and hocks are broad. The feet are arched, well-knit, have firm pads and hair between the toes, and point straight ahead. The tail is set on level with the topline, strong at the root, tapering at the end, straight, carried in a slight upward curve, and reaches to the hock.

The Dunker's coat is straight, hard, dense, and not too short, with the most desirable colors being black or blue marbled with pale fawn and white markings. Less desirable are warm brown or predominant black reaching from the muzzle and beyond the hock joint, a black mask, and overmarked white, and more than fifty percent white color is a disqualification.

The Dunker weighs around 35–39 pounds (16–18 kg), and males are 19.5–21.5 inches (50–55 cm) at the withers, while females are 18.5–20.5 inches (47–52 cm).

== History ==
The breed is named after the Norwegian Wilhelm Dunker, who bred this dog for hunting hares at the beginning of the 19th century. To create the Dunker, Wilhelm crossed a Russian Harlequin Hound with reliable scent hounds, producing a dog that could hunt rabbits by scent, rather than sight. It has yet to become popular outside of its homeland.

== Temperament ==
The Dunker is a robust breed and an excellent hunting dog. It is considered easy to train when using positive reinforcement such as clicker training. It has a huge operational range when hunting, and is one of few hare hunting dogs that is capable of hunting in thick snow cover during the winter.

A Dunker needs much exercise and many activities where it has to use its intelligence. It rarely barks outside of hunting if properly exercised, and it is considered to be a good family dog if it's also used as a hunting dog.

== See also ==
- List of dog breeds
