= Michael Werner (publisher) =

German scholar of Pennsylvania German

Michael Werner (born 1965 in Frankenthal, Germany) is a publisher of Pennsylvania German publications and writer of Pennsylvania German articles, prose and poetry. He is the founder and publisher of the only existing Pennsylvania German newspaper, Hiwwe wie Driwwe.

== Life ==
Werner was raised in the Palatinate (Germany). Members of his family had emigrated from this area to the U.S. in the 19th century. He studied at the University of Mannheim and holds a Master's degree in General Linguistics, German Studies and Sociology. His Ph.D. Thesis is dealing with Pennsylvania German literature. Werner is working as publishing director of a B2B publishing house in Mainz (Germany). He lives in Ober-Olm.

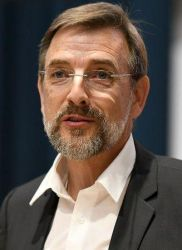
Michael Werner is the publisher of the Pennsylvania German newspaper "Hiwwe wie Driwwe"

== Activities ==
In 1993, he became a student of C. Richard Beam (1925-2018), director of the Center for Pennsylvania German Studies at Millersville University (PA). In the same year, Werner started a private "Archive for Pennsylvania German Literature" in the Palatinate, Germany. In 1996, the newspaper Hiwwe wie Driwwe was founded by him in Ebertsheim, Palatinate (Germany). Actually, it is being published bi-annually. Since 1998, he has been a member of the jury of the oldest Palatine Dialect Writers Contest in Bockenheim an der Weinstraße, Palatinate (Germany). In 2003, Michael Werner was one of the co-founders of the German-Pennsylvanian Association and the first president of the association (until 2010). Since 2008, Werner invites speakers of Pennsylvania German to give presentations about the language and culture in Germany. In 2013, "Hiwwe wie Driwwe" started a cooperation with the Pennsylvania German Cultural Heritage Center at Kutztown University (PA). The editorial office was moved to Pennsylvania in 2015. In 2017, Werner donated his private archive of Pennsylvania German literature and folk life to the Mennonite Research Center at Weierhof (Palatinate, Germany), where it will be presented to the public as "Deutsch-Pennsylvanisches Archiv" (German-Pennsylvanian Archive). In 2020, he was one of the founders of Groundhog Lodge No. 19 in Bockenheim (Palatinate, Germany). In 2021, Werner published a German trip advisor to the Pennsylvania Dutch Country.

== Trivia ==
His journalistic work over a period of three decades inspired two German cinema documentaries: "Hiwwe wie Driwwe 1" (2018) and "Hiwwe wie Driwwe 2" (2024).

== Works ==
- Werner, Michael (Ed.): Hiwwe wie Driwwe. The Pennsylvania German Review (Newspaper). Ebertsheim/Ober-Olm/Kutztown 1997-.
- Werner, Michael: "Ebbes aus em alte Land". Newspaper Column. In: The Pennsylvania German Review (Kutztown, PA), 2001-2003.
- Werner, Michael: "Ebbes in die Mudderschprooch". Newspaper Column. In: The Diary (Gordonville, PA), 2003-2005.
- Werner, Michael: "S Katz Deitsch Schtick". Internet Blog. In: hiwwe-wie-driwwe.de. Ober-Olm 2002-.
- Werner, Michael et al. (Ed.): Mit Pennsylvanisch-Deitsch darich's Yaahr. A Pennsylvania German Reader for Grandparents and Grandchildren. Neckarsteinach 2006.
- Werner, Michael (Transl.): Es globbt beim Sammy in der Nacht (Children's Book). Neckarsteinach 2012.
- Werner, Michael: "Der Uncle Saem findt uns gedrei" - A Multimedia Performance (Texts, Music, Pictures & Videos), presented by the "New Paltz Band". Ober-Olm/Frankenthal/Schifferstadt 2013-.
- Werner, Michael (Transl.): Kumm, mer gehne Baere yaage (engl. Original: We're Going on a Bear Hunt, by Michael Rosen). Neckarsteinach/Morgantown (PA) 2014.
- Werner, Michael: Pennsylvanisch-Deitsch im Yahr 2015. A Hiwwe wie Driwwe Documentary. Published on youtube.com (30 minutes).
- Werner, Michael (Ed.): DEITSCH. News und Geschichten aus dem Pennsylvania Dutch Country. A Hiwwe wie Driwwe Publication (E-Paper). Ober-Olm 2015-2017.
- Werner, Michael / Louden, Mark / Sauer, Walter (Eds.): Die Erschte Dausend Wadde in Pennsilfaanisch Deitsch. Neckarsteinach 2018.
- Werner, Michael: En neier Sound im neie Land - 32 New Songs in Pennsylvania Dutch. Ober-Olm 2019.
- Werner, Michael: Hiwwe wie Driwwe - Der Pennsylvania ReiseVERführer. Neustadt an der Weinstraße 2021.
- Werner, Michael / Donmoyer, Patrick (Eds.): 25 Yaahre Hiwwe wie Driwwe - Celebrating a Quarter Century of Transatlantic Friendship. Morgantown (PA) 2022.
- Werner, Michael: Elwedritsche - Dunkle Gefährten. Neustadt an der Weinstraße (2025).

== Films ==
- Hiwwe wie Driwwe - Pfälzisch in Amerika (2018). Calimedia/Cinewa (Landau). - Expert advice and participation.
- Die Rezeptsucherin: Pennsylvania (2018). SWR (Mainz). - Expert advice.
- The Roots of the Pennsylvania Dutch (2019). Calimedia/Cinewa (Landau).
- Driwwe im neie Land - Pfälzisch in Amerika (2020). SWR (Mainz).
- Rumspringa (2022). Constantin Film (Munich). - Expert advice and language training of the actors (Pennsylvania Dutch).
- Hiwwe wie Driwwe 2 (2024). Cinewa (Landau). - Expert advice and participation.

== Publishing ==
#	Year	Book	Hiwwe wie Driwwe Series
1.	2012	Michael Werner: Es globbt beim Sammy in der Nacht (Original: Es klopft bei Wanja in der Nacht, deutsch, 1985)	Hiwwe wie Driwwe Series No. 1
2.	2013	Walter Sauer: Es Haus, wu der Jack gebaut hot (Original: The House that Jack built, english, 1853)	Hiwwe wie Driwwe Series No. 2
3.	2014	Earl C. Haag: Der Schtruwwelpitter. 2nd Edition (Original: Der Struwwelpeter, deutsch, 1845)	Hiwwe wie Driwwe Series No. 3
4.	2014	Michael Werner: Kumm, mer gehne Baere yaage (Original: We're Going on a Bear Hunt, English, 1989)	Hiwwe wie Driwwe Series No. 4
5.	2016	Rachel Yoder: Penny Olive	Hiwwe wie Driwwe Series No. 5
6.	2016	Walter Sauer: Ebbes weeich die Watzelkinner	Hiwwe wie Driwwe Series No. 6
7.	2017	Mark L. Louden: De glee Brins (Original: Le petit prince)	Hiwwe wie Driwwe Series No. 7
8.	2018	Mark L. Louden / Walter Sauer / Michael Werner: Die Erschte Dausend Wadde in Pennsilfaanisch Deitsch	Hiwwe wie Driwwe Series No. 8
9.	2018	Rachel Yoder & Douglas Madenford: Davey Applebutter	Hiwwe wie Driwwe Series No. 9
10.	2019	Michael Werner: En neier Sound im neie Land - 32 New Songs in Pennsylvania Dutch	Hiwwe wie Driwwe Series No. 10
11.	2019	Walter Sauer: Die Schtori vum Peter Haas (Original: The Tale of Peter Rabbit, englisch, 1902)	Hiwwe wie Driwwe Series No. 11
12.	2021	Michael Werner: Hiwwe wie Driwwe - Der Pennsylvania ReiseVERführer. Mit einem Grußwort von Malu Dreyer.	Hiwwe wie Driwwe Series No. 12

== Awards and acknowledgements ==
- 1998: Member of the jury of the Palatine Dialect Writers Contest in Bockenheim (Palatinate, Germany)
- 2007: "10th J. William Frey Lecturer", Franklin & Marshall College (Lancaster, PA)
- 2012: "Medienpreis Pfalz", Bezirksverband Pfalz (short list) - for "Hiwwe wie Driwwe"
- 2015: "Emichsburg-Preis", Förderkreis Mundart Bockenheim e.V. - together with Frank Kessler and Dr. Walter Sauer in place of the "German-Pennsylvanian Association" (Deutsch-Pennsylvanischer Arbeitskreis e.V.)
- 2019: Official participant in the German-American Year "Wunderbar together" of the German Federal Foreign Office and the Goethe Institute Washington D.C.
- 2020: "Hermann Sinsheimer Plakette", City of Freinsheim (Palatinate, Germany) - for his services to the Palatine and Pennsylvania German literature
