= Hiwwe wie Driwwe =

Newspaper written in Pennsylvanian German

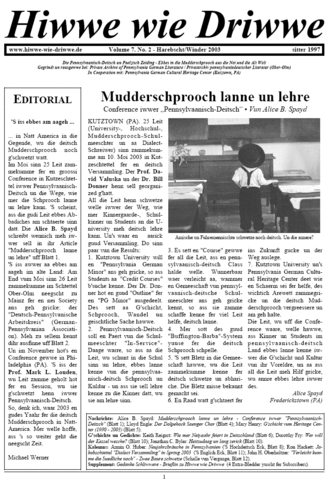
- Type: Newspaper
- Owner: Pennsylvania German Cultural Heritage Center
- Founder: Michael Werner
- Publisher: Michael Werner, Patrick Donmoyer
- Founded: 1996
- Headquarters: Kutztown, Pennsylvania; Ober-Olm, Germany
- Circulation: 2,000 bi-annually
- Website: hiwwe-wie-driwwe.de

Hiwwe wie Driwwe, which means "Hither like thither" (compare German: Hüben wie Drüben), is the title of the only existing Pennsylvania German-language newspaper.

== Publication ==
Since 1996, the publication is distributed twice a year. More than 100 Pennsylvania German authors—members of Lutheran and UCC churches as well as Old Order Amish and Old Order Mennonites—have already contributed pieces of prose, poems and newspaper articles. The founder and publisher is Michael Werner (Ober-Olm, Germany), who also served as president of the German-Pennsylvanian Association between 2003 and 2010. On their websites, one can find poems, stories, videos and lessons in the dialect. In 2011, Hiwwe wie Driwwe has created a "Hiwwe wie Driwwe Award for Pennsylvania German Literature" in cooperation with the Palatine Writers Contest in Bockenheim (Germany) and Kutztown University's Pennsylvania German Minor Program. Since 2013, Hiwwe wie Driwwe is printed in Pennsylvania, and in 2015, the editorial headquarter was moved to the Pennsylvania German Cultural Heritage Center at Kutztown University.

== Editors ==
The publication was founded in 1996. Since 2013, an editorial team is responsible for the whole publishing process.

Year	Publisher	Editor	Co-Editors	Printed in
1996–2013	Michael Werner	Michael Werner	-	Ebertsheim, Föhren (Germany)
2013–2015	Michael Werner	Michael Werner	Patrick Donmoyer, Amanda Richardson	Ephrata (PA)
2015–2021	Michael Werner	Patrick Donmoyer (Print), Michael Werner (Online, HwD Award)	Douglas Madenford (since 2015), Edward Quinter (since 2017), Naomi Esther	Reading (PA), Ephrata (PA)
2021–	Michael Werner, Patrick Donmoyer	Patrick Donmoyer	Douglas Madenford, Edward Quinter	Reading (PA), Ephrata (PA)

- Donmoyer, Patrick (* 1985 / USA): Folk culture specialist, site manager at the Pennsylvania German Cultural Heritage Center (Kutztown University), board member of Groundhog Lodge No. 1.
- Esther, Naomi (USA)(* 1990 / USA): Co-Worker at the Pennsylvania German Cultural Heritage Center (Kutztown University)
- Madenford, Douglas (* 1980 / USA): High school teacher (High German), youtuber, blogger, author, musician.
- Quinter, Edward (* 1950 / USA): High school teacher (High German), author, co-organizer of the "Pennsylvania German Writing Festival" at the Kutztown Folk Festival.
- Richardson, Amanda (* 1987 / USA): Co-Worker at the Pennsylvania German Cultural Heritage Center (Kutztown University).
- Werner, Michael (* 1965 / Germany): Publisher, journalist, author, translator, musician. Founder of the German-Pennsylvanian Archive, Hiwwe wie Driwwe, the German-Pennsylvanian Association and Grundsau Lodsch No. 19 im alte Land.

== Website ==
The website was started in January 2002 and features various Pennsylvania German programs.

#	Year	Author	Program
1.	2002–	Michael Werner: 'S Katz Deitsch Schtick	Blog
2.	2002–2003	Paul Bittner: Pennsylvania German Web Radio (WGPA Bethlehem)	Audio podcast
3.	2002–2006	C. Richard Beam: 'S Pennsylvanisch Deitsch Eck (Shopping News, Ephrata)	Texts
4.	2007	Alice Spayd: Pennsylvania German Web Class (Online Lessons)	Audio podcast
5.	2008–2021	Michael Werner: Hiwwe wie Driwwe Web TV	Videos
6.	2009–2021	Douglas Madenford: Nau loss mich yuscht ebbes saage	Blog
7.	2011–2013	Virgil Schrock: Interviews with Pennsylvania Germans	Videos
8.	2013–2014	Douglas Madenford: Pennsylvania Dutch 101 (Online Lessons)	Videos
9.	2014–2021	Douglas Madenford & Chris LaRose: Ask a Pennsylvania Dutchman	Videos
10.	2015–2021	Patrick Donmoyer: Die Pennsylvanisch-Deitsch Schtunn (BCTV Reading)	Videos
11.	2016–2021	Douglas Madenford: Your PA Dutch Minute	Videos
12.	2017	Peter Zacharias & Edwin Zacharias: Pennsylvania German Dictionary	Online dictionary
13.	2017–2021	Luella Reed Sebo: Easy Deitsch (Online Lessons)	Videos
14.	2018–2021	Jeffrey Tapler: "Uncle Jeffrey" (Community News)	Videos

== Winners of the Hiwwe wie Driwwe Award ==
The award is given by the jury of the Palatine Dialect Poets Contest in Bockenheim. (Palatinate, Germany).

#	Year	Winner
1.	2011	Richard Savidge (Hegins, PA): 'S iss Winder im Daal (Poem)
2.	2012	Kevin Sterner (Gilbertsville, PA): Middagesse in de Zwansicher (Story)
3.	2013	Don Breininger (New Tripoli, PA): Chocolate Cookies (Story)
4.	2014	Glynn Custred (Walnut Creek, CA): En seltsame Schtori (Story)
5.	2015	Kevin Sterner (Gilbertsville, PA): De Yahreszeide ihre Dod (Story)
6.	2016	Edward Quinter (Allentown, PA): Mei Bax (Poem)
7.	2017	Edward Quinter (Allentown, PA): Die Welle (Poem)
8.	2018	Patrick Donmoyer (Harleysville, PA): Die Wandrer (Poem)
9.	2019	Patrick Donmoyer (Harleysville, PA): Gemahn mich wie (Poem)
10.	2020	Douglas Madenford (Howard, PA) – En neie Zukunft?" (Story)
11.	2022	Patrick Donmoyer (Harleysville, PA): Net zu hatt (Poem)
12.	2023	Erich Mace (Berks County): Wu bischt du gebliwwe? (Poem)

== Books ==
#	Year	Book	Hiwwe wie Driwwe series
1.	2006	Walter Sauer, Michael Werner et al. (Eds.): Mit Pennsylvaanisch-Deitsch darich's Yaahr. A Pennsylvania German Reader for Grandparents and Grandchildren. Published by the German-Pennsylvanian Association.	
2.	2010	Earl C. Haag: Der Schtruwwelpitter (Original: Der Struwwelpeter, deutsch, 1845)	
3.	2012	Michael Werner: Es globbt beim Sammy in der Nacht (Original: Es klopft bei Wanja in der Nacht, deutsch, 1985)	HwD Series No. 1
4.	2013	Walter Sauer: Es Haus, wu der Jack gebaut hot (Original: The House that Jack built, English, 1853)	HwD Series No. 2
5.	2014	Earl C. Haag: Der Schtruwwelpitter. 2nd Edition (Original: Der Struwwelpeter, deutsch, 1845)	HwD Series No. 3
6.	2014	Michael Werner: Kumm, mer gehne Baere yaage (Original: We're Going on a Bear Hunt, English, 1989)	HwD Series No. 4
7.	2016	Rachel Yoder: Penny Olive	HwD Series No. 5
8.	2016	Walter Sauer: Ebbes weeich die Watzelkinner	HwD Series No. 6
9.	2017	Mark L. Louden: Der Glee Brins, 2nd edition (Original: "Le petit prince", 1943)	HwD Series No. 7
10.	2018	Mark L. Louden, Walter Sauer & Michael Werner: Die erschte dausend Wadde in Pennsilfaanisch Deitsch (Original: The First 1000 Words in English, englisch, 1979)	HwD Series No. 8
11.	2018	Rachel Yoder & Douglas Madenford: Davey Applebutter	HwD Series No. 9
12.	2019	Michael Werner: En neier Sound im neie Land – 32 new songs in Pennsylvania Dutch	HwD Series No. 10
13.	2019	Walter Sauer: Die Schtori vum Peter Haas (Original: The Tale of Peter Rabbit, englisch, 1902)	HwD Series No. 11
14.	2021	Michael Werner: Hiwwe wie Driwwe - Der Pennsylvania ReiseVERführer. Mit einem Grußwort von Malu Dreyer.	HwD Series No. 12
15.	2022	Michael Werner & Patrick Donmoyer: 25 Yaahre Hiwwe wie Driwwe - Celebrating a Quarter Century of Transatlantic Friendship. Morgantown (PA).	
16.	2024	Walter Sauer, Mark L. Louden & Rose A. Fisher: Oh was iss es so schee in Panama (Original: Oh wie schön ist Panama, 1978). Neckarsteinach.	HwD Series No. 13

== Hiwwe wie Driwwe's Featured Artist of the Year ==
#	Jahr	Gewinner
1.	2016	Rachel Yoder (Boyertown, PA): Pennsylvania German Folk Art Paintings
2.	2017	Benjamin Rader (Reeders, PA): Heemetkunscht (Paintings)
3.	2018	Eric Claypoole (Lenhartsville, PA): Deitsche Scheierschtanne (Barn Stars)
4.	2019	Mike & Linda Hertzog (Blandon, PA): Deitsche Neiyaahrswinsche & Dialect Music
5.	2020	Keith Brintzenhoff (Kutztown, PA): Pennsylvania German Music
6.	2021	Ivan Hoyt (Wapwallopen, PA): Pennsylvania German Folk Art

== Hiwwe wie Driwwe Palatinate Tour ==
Starting in 2008, in collaboration with the Emigration Museum in Oberalben (Auswanderermuseum Oberalben), Hiwwe wie Driwwe organized an annual lecture, reading or concert in October under the title German-Pennsylvanian History(s). Starting in 2010, this developed in the Hiwwe wie Driwwe Palatinate Tour, in which the featured guest(s) go on a four-day tour, performing in Ober-Olm (at the Old Town Hall), Oberalben (at the Emigration Museum), Bockenheim (at the Palatinate Dialect Poetry Competition), and ending with German-Pennsylvanian Day (organized by the German-Pennsylvanian Working Group Deutsch-Pennsylvanischer Arbeitskreis), which changes location each year. To date, the guests from the USA and Germany have been:

#	Year	Speaker/Musician
1.	2008	Michael Werner (Ober-Olm)
2.	2009	Don Yoder (Devon, PA)
3.	2010	John Schmid (Berlin, OH)
4.	2011	Don Breininger (New Tripoli, PA)
5.	2012	Keith Brintzenhoff (Kutztown, PA)
6.	2013	Richard Miller (Topton, PA)
7.	2014	Bill Meck (Alburtis, PA)
8.	2015	Roland Paul (Kaiserslautern), Walter Sauer (Neckarsteinach), Michael Geib (Ramstein-Miesenbach), Helmut Seebach (Mainz)
9.	2015	John Schmid (Berlin, OH), Mark Louden (Madison, WI)
10.	2016	Chris LaRose (Mount Etna, PA)
11.	2017	Mike & Linda Hertzog (Blandon, PA)
12.	2018	Patrick Donmoyer (Harleysville, PA)
13.	2019	Benjamin Rader (Reeders, PA)
14.	2020	John Schmid (Berlin, OH) – cancelled due to Coronavirus pandemic
15.	2021	Michael Werner (Ober-Olm)
16.	2022	Erich Mace (Berks County, currently living in Frankenthal, Germany)
17.	2022	Douglas Madenford (Howard, PA)
18.	2023	Keith Brintzenhoff (Kutztown, PA)
19.	2023	John Schmid (Berlin, OH)
20.	2024	Scott Reagan (Nazareth, PA) – original & traditional PA Dutch folk music

== Hiwwe wie Driwwe Pennsylvania Tour ==
Since 2019 there has also been a “Pennsylvania Tour”, which takes artists from Germany on a concert or reading tour to Pennsylvania – and to the Kutztown Folk Festival. To date, the featured guests have been:

#	Year	Speaker/Musician & Program
1.	2019	Michael Werner & The New Paltz Band (Frankenthal/Lambsheim/Ober-Olm): „"Wunderbar Together: Pennsylvania Dutch Music“
2.	2019	Christian Schega & Benjamin Wagener (Landau in der Pfalz): Hiwwe wie Driwwe – Pfälzisch in Amerika ('Here like there – Palatine German in America') (Documentary film)
3.	2019	Frank Kessler (Brüssel, Belgien): Readings of the PA Dutch children's books published by Edition Tintenfaß
4.	2020	Oompah House Band (Kollweiler, Pfalz): Palatine Brass Music – cancelled due to Coronavirus pandemic
5.	2022	Michael Werner (Ober-Olm): "Hiwwe wie Driwwe" - En neier Sound im neie Land" ('A new sound in the new land') (Musical program)
6.	2023	Herbert Tiefel & Karin Tiefel (Lampertheim): „Bilingual Signage Project of the German-Pennsylvanian Working Group
7.	2025	Pälzer Krischer (Altrip) with Scott Reagan (Nazareth, PA): Palatine and Pennsylvania Dutch folk music

== Scientific reception ==
David L Valuska & William Donner, Kutztown University (2004): "This journal and an associated internet site are leading sources for information about the Pennsylvania German language."

Patrick Donmoyer, Pennsylvania German Cultural Heritage Center at Kutztown University (2012): „Hiwwe wie Driwwe is the most widely-known dialect publication in the world for Pennsylvania German / Palatine German dialect, with a strong readership throughout the US, Canada and Europe."

C. Richard Beam, Center for Pennsylvania German Studies at Millersville University (2014): "Hiwwe wie Driwwe has succeeded in establishing a bridge between the Old and the New World and it has succeeded in the preservation of the Pennsylvania German dialect and culture."

Sheily Rohrer, Penn State University (2017): "Started as a newspaper by Michael Werner in Ebertsheim, Germany, Hiwwe wie Driwwe on the internet and in print has mediated a transnational conversation of dialect writers with one another."

Claire Noble, Colorado (2018): "In 1890, there were more than 1,000 German-language newspapers in America. Today, only a handful remains, such as Hiwwe wie Driwwe, the last remaining German newspaper in Pennsylvania."
