= Christoph Sauer =

German-American printer and publisher

Christoph Sauer (1695 – September 25, 1758) was the first German-language printer and publisher in North America.

Johann Christoph Sauer was born in 1695 in Ladenburg (near Heidelberg), the son of a Reformed pastor. He came to the county (Graftschaft) of Wittgenstein in central Germany as a child with his widowed mother some time between 1700 and 1710. He was a graduate of a German university, and studied medicine at the University of Halle. At the time, its rulers were tolerant of a variety of Pietists and other religious dissenters, most notably Alexander Mack, who would found the Schwarzenau Brethren and later emigrate to the United States. Most Brethren denominations descend from this original congregation. Johann Christoph Sauer married the widowed Maria Christina (born Gruber) in 1720. The family lived in the village of Schwarzenau, which now belongs to the town of Berleburg though had ties to Laasphe as well.

== Pennsylvania ==
The family emigrated to Pennsylvania in 1724, settling in Germantown. Sauer worked as a tailor before moving in 1726 to Lancaster where he had a 50-acre (200,000 m^{2}) farm. In 1731, Sauer's wife, Maria Christina, joined Johann Conrad Beissel's Seventh Day Baptist community at Ephrata, the Ephrata Cloister. She was known in Ephrata as "Sister Marcella," and eventually became sub-prioress of the community, which was dedicated to celibacy. Maria Christina's decision disabled Sauer's farming operation, and he moved with his son to Germantown where that same year he built a large dwelling for his residence.

In order to supply the needs of other German-speaking people in the colonies who were liberally educated, especially in theology, he obtained Bibles and religious works from Germany.

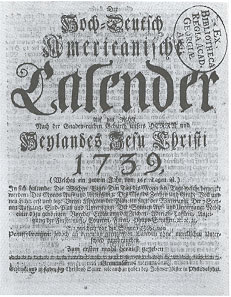
Sauer's first almanac, printed 1739

Around 1735, Sauer took up the idea of becoming a printer and publisher. Benjamin Franklin dominated this trade at the time, and was a supplier of printed materials to the large German community around Pennsylvania. Significantly, Franklin used only Roman typefaces. Sauer obtained Fraktur type from a foundry in Nuremberg originally purchased by Jacob Gass of the Ephrata Cloister. In 1738 Sauer began to publish almanacs, calendars, books and newspapers in 1739 using a type face that his German readers could more easily read.

The press itself is believed to have come from Berleburg in Wittgenstein, with which he had remained in contact. It had been used by Pietist printers there. Sauer also made his own ink, which he eventually sold as “Sauer’s Curious Pennsylvania Ink-Powder.”

In 1739 he brought out the first number of Der Hoch-Deutsch Pensylvanische Geschichts-Schreiber, a religious and secular journal, a small folio, 9 inches (230 mm) by 13 inches (330 mm), which attained a circulation of nearly 10,000, and had great influence among his countrymen. It was the first of its kind that was published in a non-English language in Pennsylvania.

== Bible ==
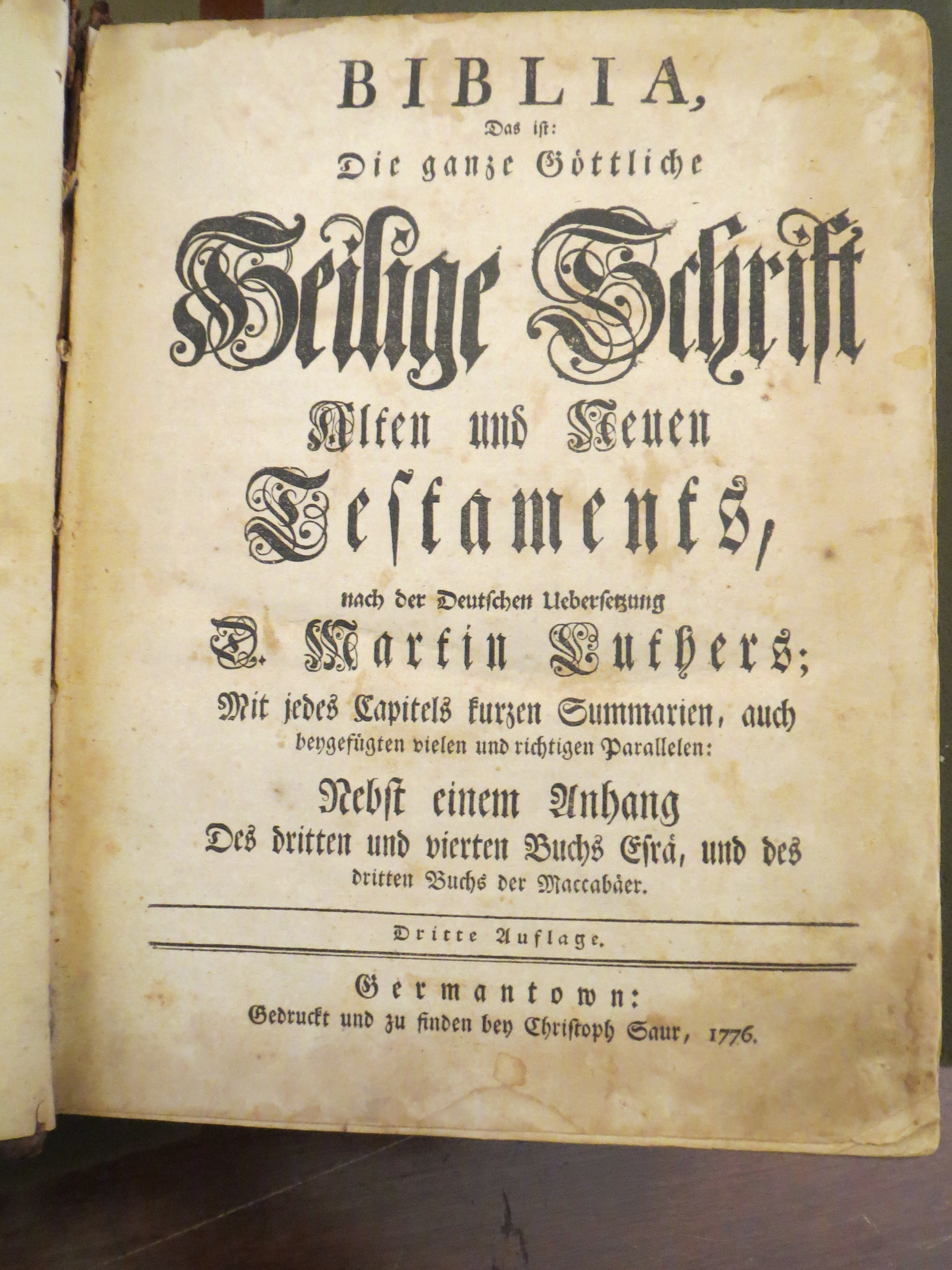
The Sauer Bible

In 1743, Sauer published the first German-language Bible to be printed in North America (the first in any European language). It was a quarto edition of the Bible in high German, Luther's translation, which was limited to 1,200 copies of 1,284 pages. All pages were hand-set and printed one sheet at a time. It bore the title "Biblia, Das ist: Die Heilige Schrift Alten und Neuen Testaments, Nach der Deutschen Übersetzung D. Martin Luther". (Bible: The Holy Scripture of the Old and New Testaments following the translation of Dr. Martin Luther). Another 40 years would pass before an English-language Bible would appear in North America. It was three years in press, the largest work as yet issued in the colonies, and was the first Bible printed in the American colonies, with the exception of John Eliot's Indian Bible.

Sauer's Bible emphasized passages most in sympathy with Anabaptist and Pietist beliefs. It was rapidly accepted among the Mennonites, Amish and Brethren. It was well received by the German churches of Pennsylvania, who were in turn influential in what became the Universalist church in the Middle Atlantic and New England states. George de Benneville (1703–1793) was an important influence on the early Universalists and, like Sauer, had sojourned among the Wittgenstein Pietists before coming to America.

Sauer remained active as a printer up until his death on September 25, 1758, in Germantown, but none of his other publications had the impact of the "Sauer Bible." The latter was re-published in 1763 and again in 1776 by his son.

== See also ==
- German American journalism
