= List of Oklahoma Sooners in the NFL draft =

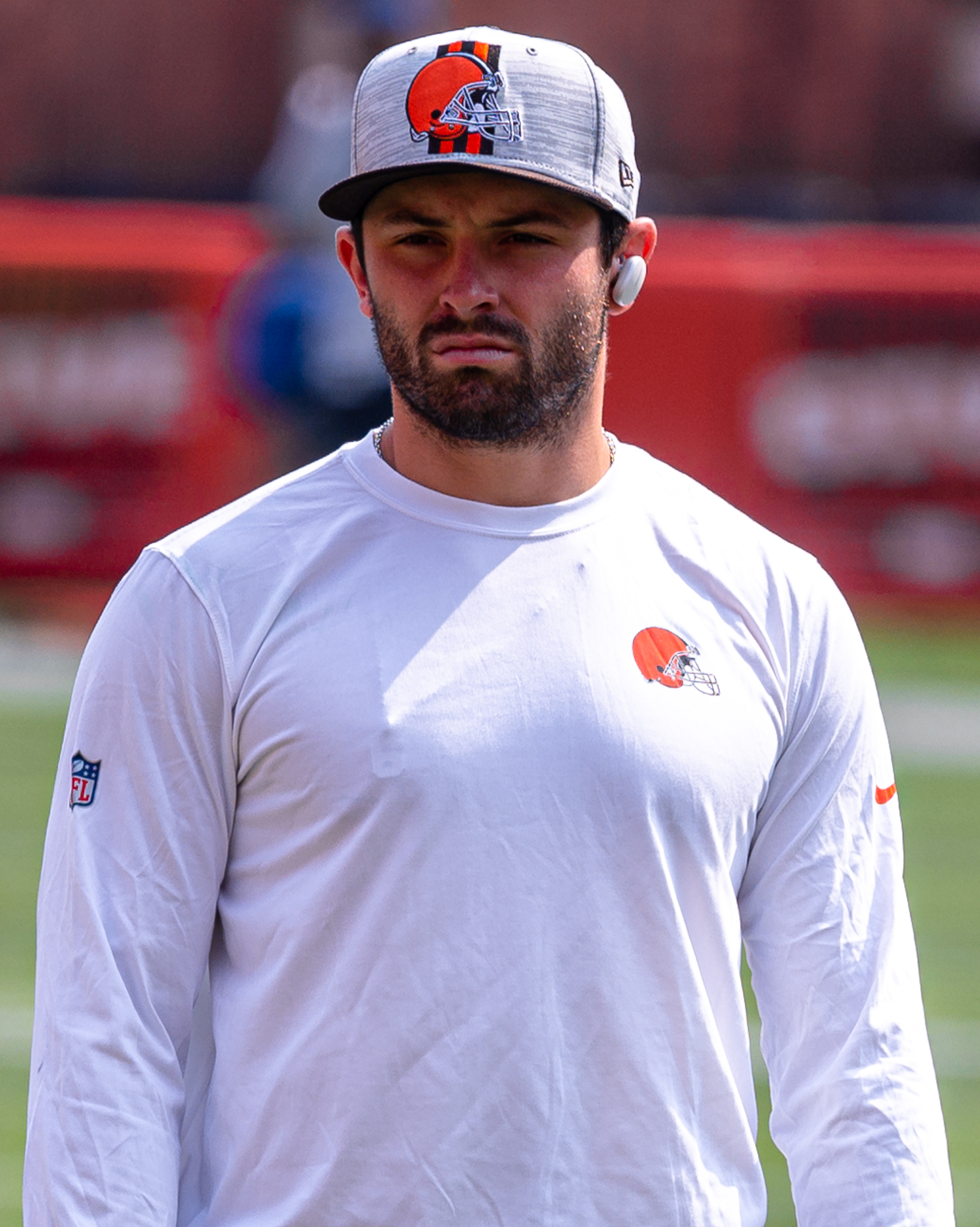
Baker Mayfield was drafted first overall in the 2018 NFL draft

The University of Oklahoma Sooners football team has had 426 players drafted into the National Football League (NFL) since the league began holding drafts in 1936. (Note: Because of the NFL–AFL merger agreement, the history of the AFL is officially recognized by the NFL and therefore this list includes the AFL draft (1960–1966) and the common draft (1967–1969).) This includes 51 players taken in the first round and five number one overall picks: Lee Roy Selmon in 1976, Billy Sims in 1980, Sam Bradford in 2010, Baker Mayfield in 2018, and Kyler Murray in 2019. In the 2010 NFL draft, Oklahoma became the only school in history to have three players selected in the first four picks of the draft.

Each NFL franchise seeks to add new players through the annual NFL draft. The team with the worst record the previous year picks first, the next-worst team second, and so on. Teams that did not make the playoffs are ordered by their regular-season record with any remaining ties broken by strength of schedule. Playoff participants are sequenced after non-playoff teams, based on their round of elimination (wild card, division, conference, and Super Bowl).

Before the merger agreements in 1966, the American Football League (AFL) operated in direct competition with the NFL and held a separate draft. This led to a massive bidding war over top prospects between the two leagues. As part of the merger agreement on June 8, 1966, the two leagues would hold a multiple round common draft. Once the AFL officially merged with the NFL in 1970, the common draft simply became the NFL draft.

A total of 31 former Sooners have been selected to at least one Pro Bowl, 18 to more than one, and 35 former Sooners have won a league championship.

== Key ==
QB	Quarterback	WR	Wide receiver	TE	Tight end
RB	Running back	FB	Fullback	B	Back
OL	Offensive lineman	OT	Offensive tackle	C	Center
T	Tackle	G	Guard	E	End
CB	Cornerback	DB	Defensive back	LB	Linebacker
DE	Defensive end	DT	Defensive tackle	K	Kicker

*	Selected to a Pro Bowl
†	Won a league championship
‡	Selected to a Pro Bowl and won a league championship

== Selections ==
Jammal Brown was drafted 13th overall by the New Orleans Saints in the 2005 NFL draft.

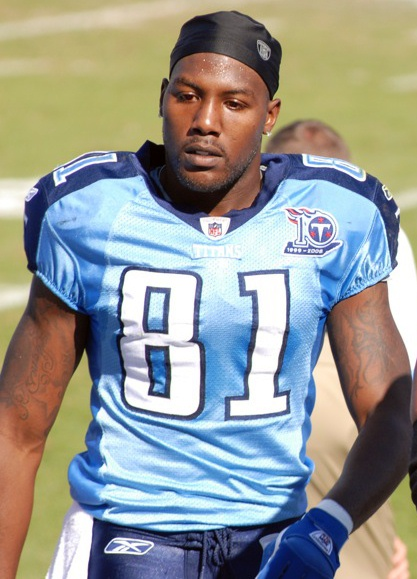
Brandon Jones was drafted 96th overall by the Tennessee Titans in the 2005 NFL draft.

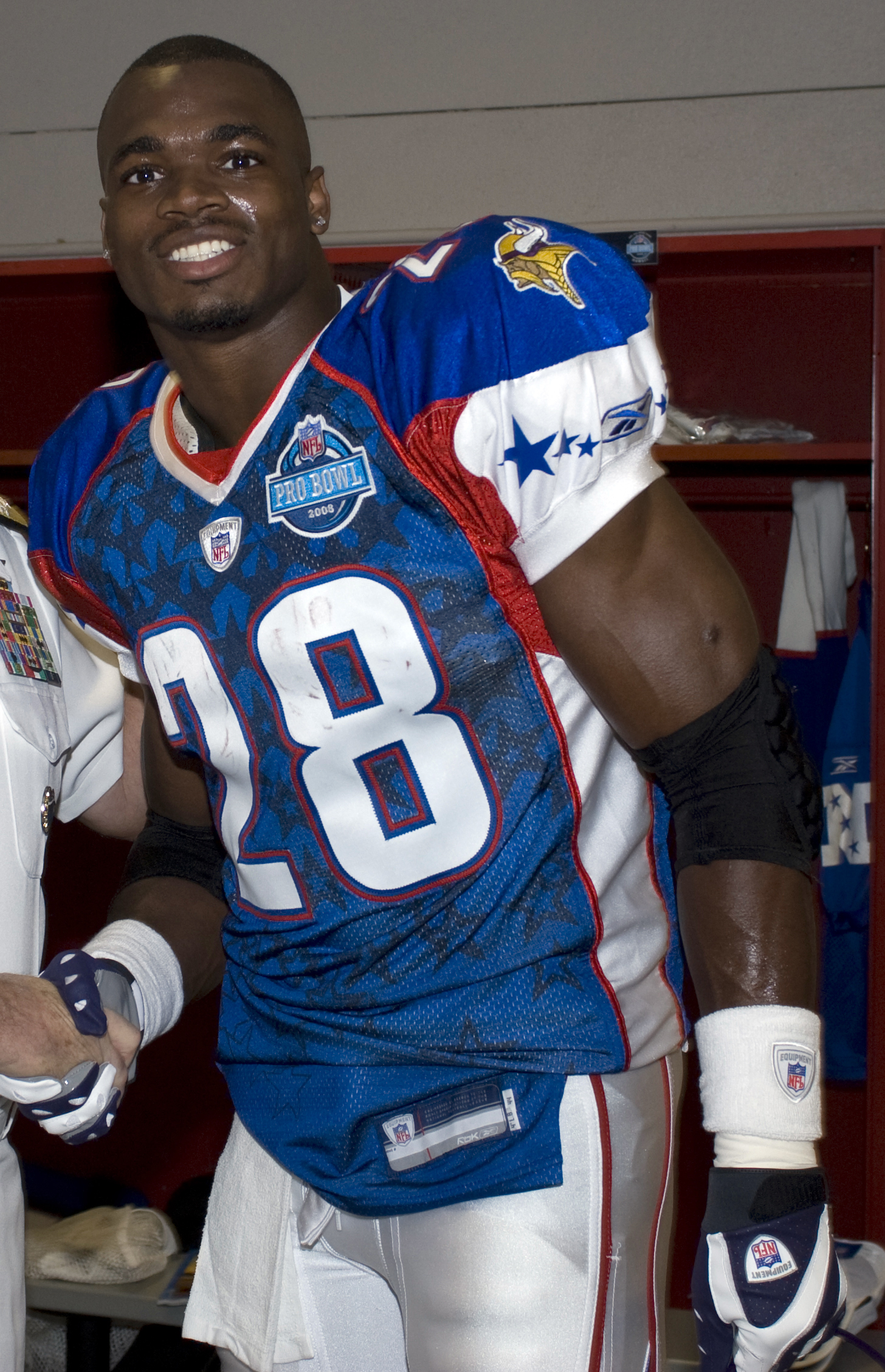
Adrian Peterson was drafted 7th overall by the Minnesota Vikings in the 2007 NFL draft.

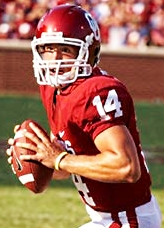
Sam Bradford was selected by the St. Louis Rams with the 1st overall pick in the 2010 NFL draft.

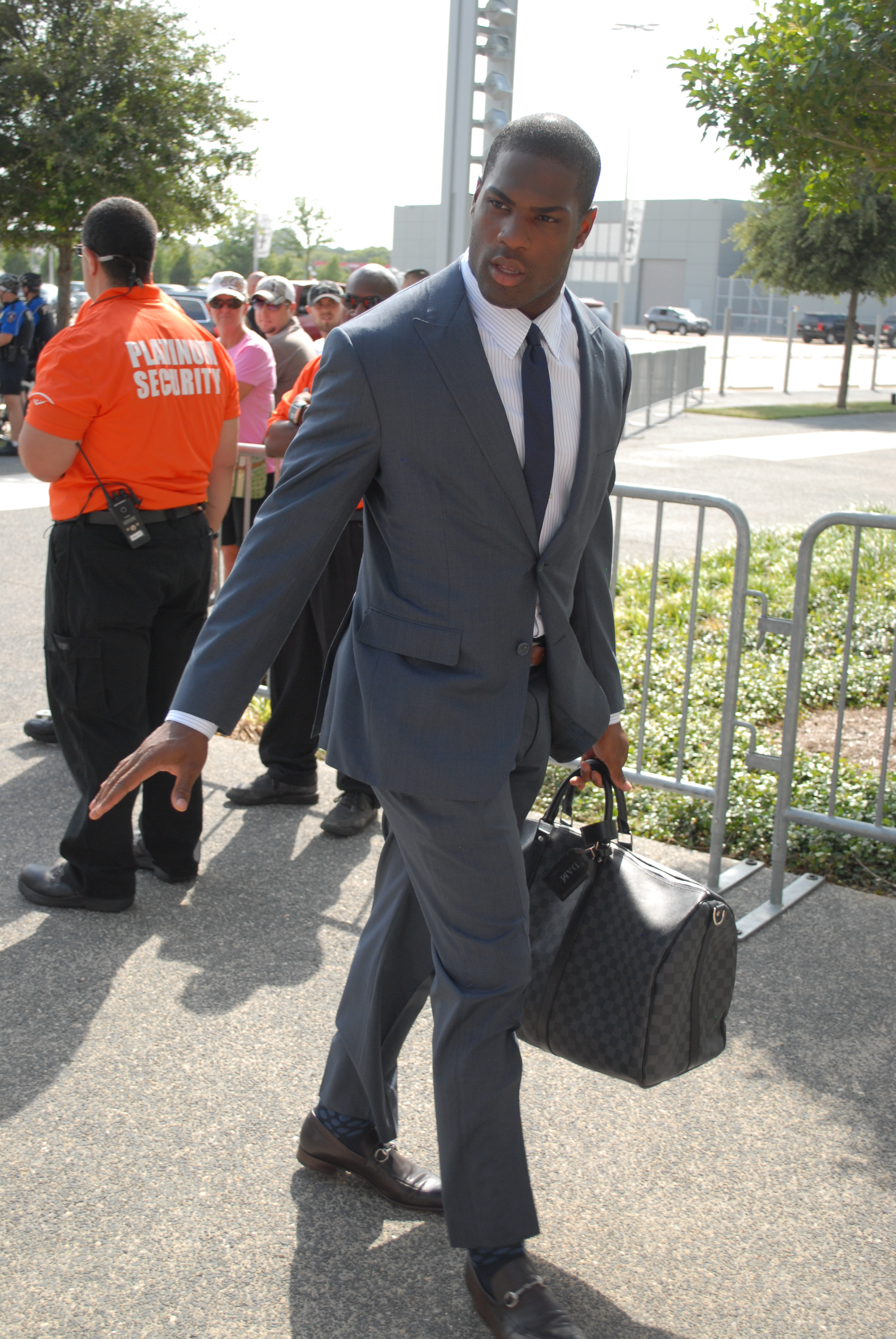
DeMarco Murray was selected by the Dallas Cowboys with the 71st overall draft pick in the 2011 NFL draft.

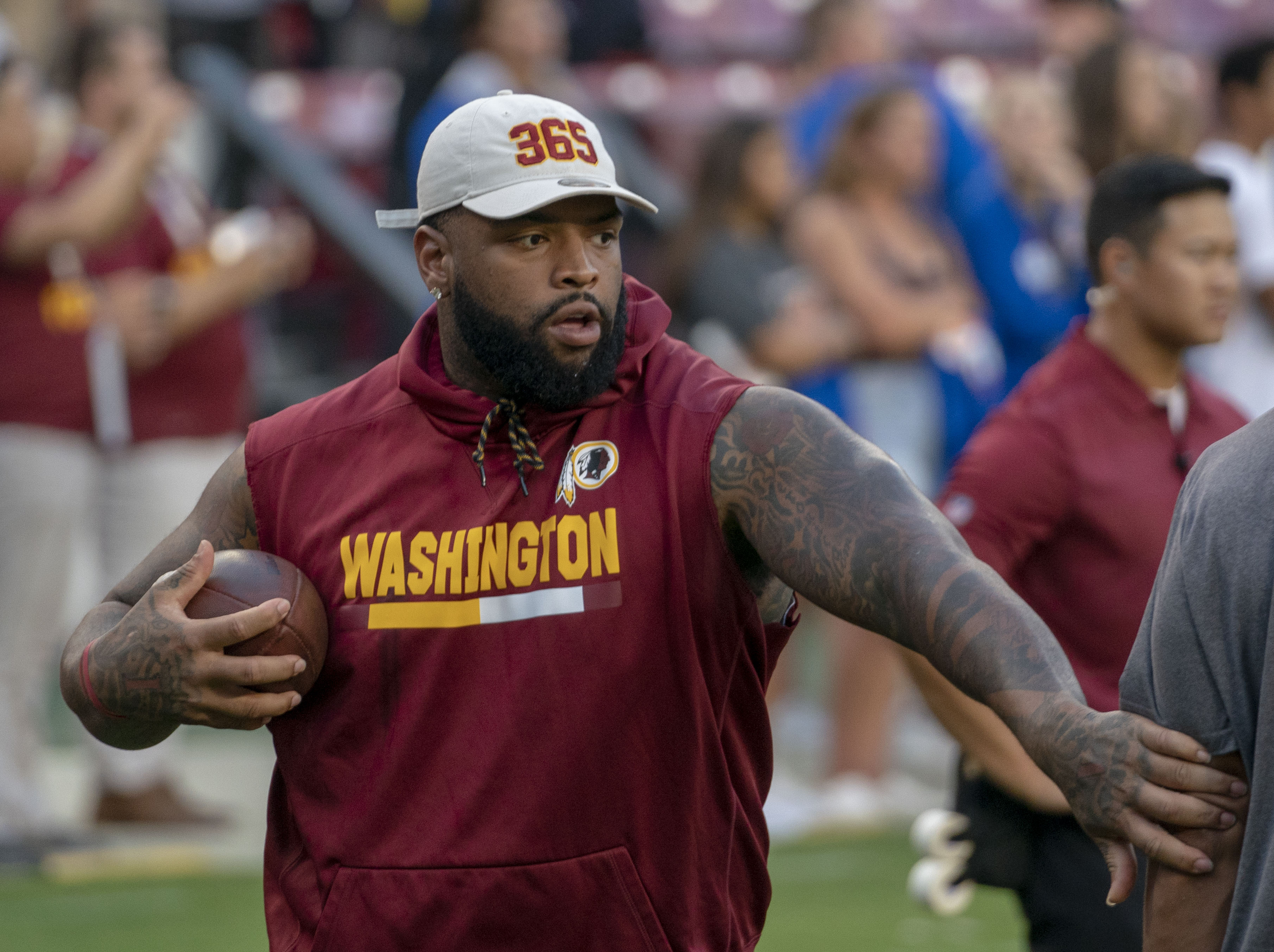
Trent Williams is awarded his 7th straight Pro bowl appearance in 2018.

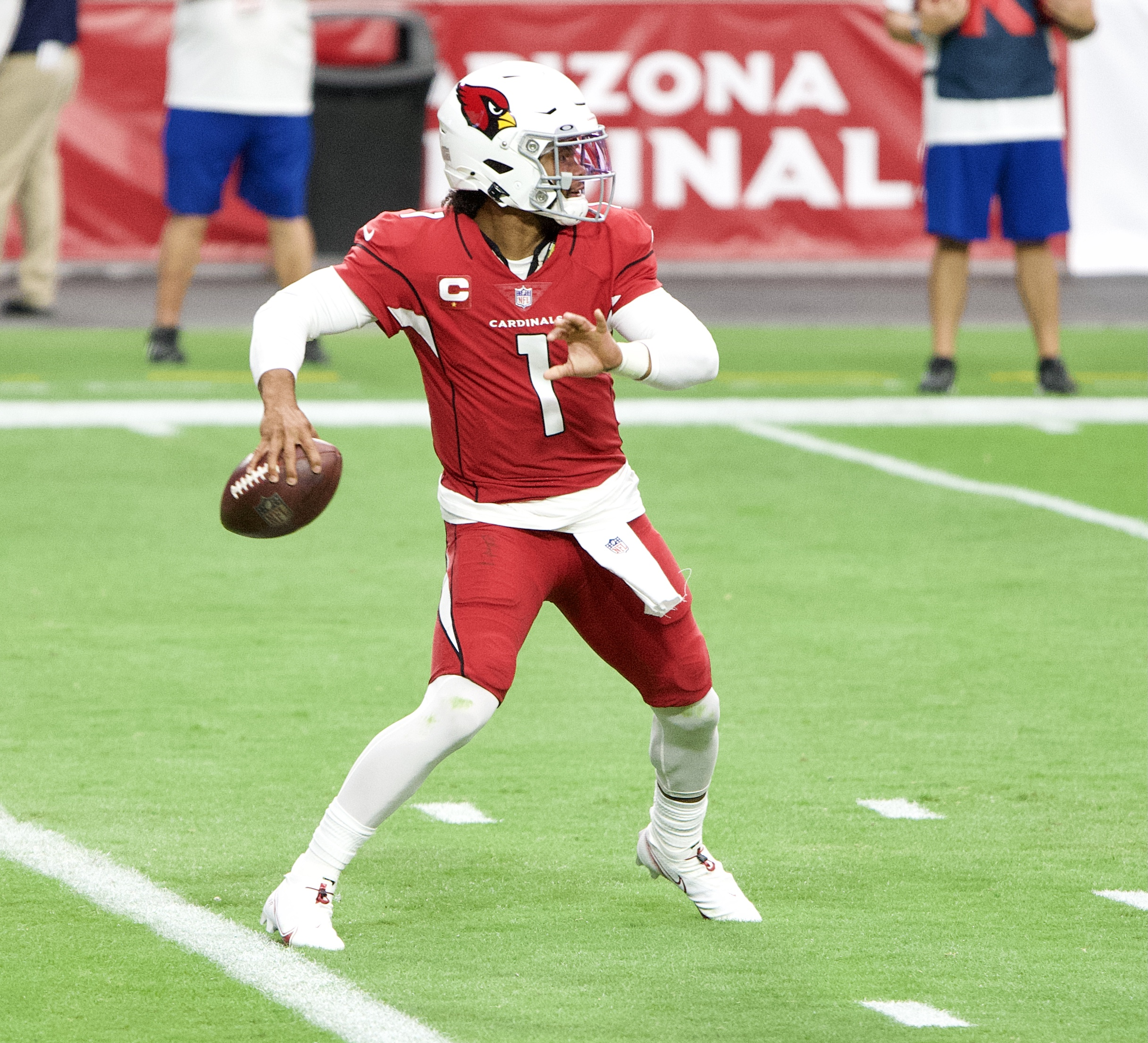
Kyler Murray being drafted 1st overall by the Arizona Cardinals in the 2019 NFL draft would mark the second time in draft history that a college has gotten back-to-back first overall picks and the first time in draft history that two quarterbacks from the same college have been drafted No. 1 overall two years in a row.

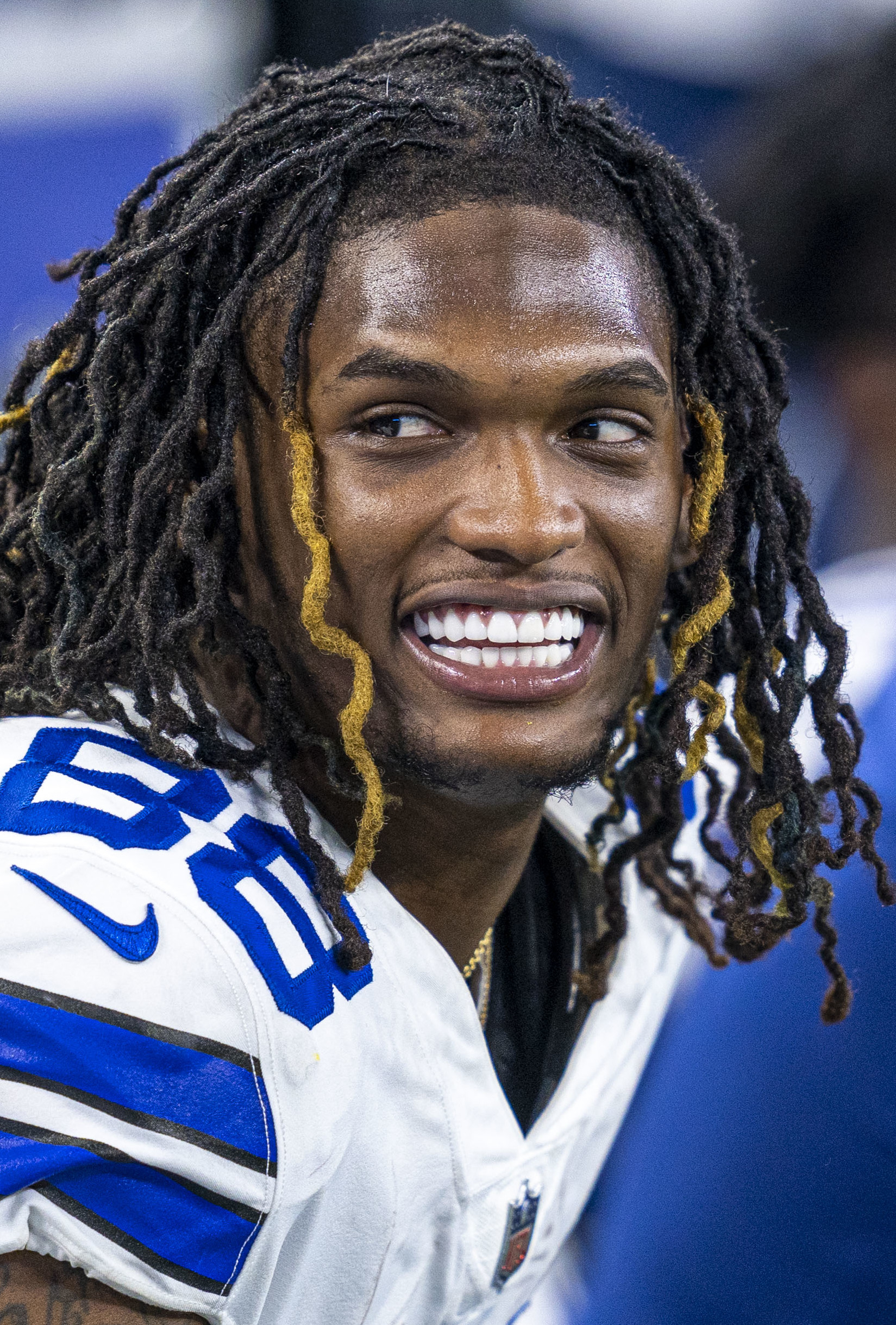
CeeDee Lamb is drafted 17th Overall by the Dallas Cowboys in the 2020 NFL draft

Year	Round	Pick	Player	Team	Position	Notes
1936	2	16	J. W. Wheeler	Green Bay Packers	T	—
1937	3	25	William Breeden	Pittsburgh Pirates	E	—
1937	4	35	Bo Hewes	Pittsburgh Pirates	B	—
1937	5	48	Red Conkright	Chicago Bears	C	—
1938	3	21	Pete Smith	Detroit Lions	E	—
1938	9	79	Ed Parks	Washington Redskins	C	—
1939	3	20	Waddy Young	Brooklyn Dodgers	E	—
1939	4	26	Hugh McCullough	Pittsburgh Pirates	B	—
1939	10	82	Earl Crowder	Chicago Cardinals	QB	—
1939	12	102	Jim Thomas	Chicago Cardinals	G	—
1939	15	140	Gil Duggan	New York Giants	T	—
1940	3	17	Dick Favor	Philadelphia Eagles	B	—
1940	4	26	Jack Shirk*	Chicago Cardinals	E	Pro Bowl (1940)
1940	4	27	Pop Ivy^{‡}	Pittsburgh Pirates	E	NFL Champion (1947); Pro Bowl (1942)
1940	9	79	J. R. Manley	Green Bay Packers	G	—
1940	10	88	Bob Seymour^{‡}	Washington Redskins	B	NFL Champion (1942); Pro Bowl (1942)
1940	13	111	Al Coppage^{†}	Chicago Cardinals	E	AAFC Champion (1946)
1940	13	116	Justin Bowers	Detroit Lions	T	—
1940	16	141	Beryl Clark	Chicago Cardinals	B	—
1940	18	165	Ralph Stevenson	Cleveland Rams	G	—
1941	9	79	Hal Lahar^{‡}	Chicago Bears	G	NFL Champion (1941); Pro Bowl (1941)
1941	14	128	Johnny Martin	Chicago Bears	B	—
1942	2	12	Jack Jacobs^{†}	Cleveland Rams	B	NFL Champion (1945)
1942	3	17	Roger Eason^{†}	Cleveland Rams	T	NFL Champion (1945)
1942	5	32	Orville Matthews	Cleveland Rams	B	—
1942	15	136	Marvin Whited^{‡}	Washington Redskins	B	NFL Champion (1942); Pro Bowl (1942)
1943	10	85	Homer Simmons	Cleveland Rams	T	—
1943	10	89	Dub Lamb^{†}	Chicago Bears	E	NFL Champion (1946)
1943	17	153	Bill Campbell^{†}	Chicago Cardinals	B	NFL Champion (1947)
1943	25	231	Huel Hamm	Detroit Lions	B	—
1944	12	111	Jim Tyree	Brooklyn Tigers	E	—
1944	22	227	Ed Davis	Chicago Bears	B	—
1944	22	230	Clare Morford	Boston Yanks	G	—
1944	23	233	Max Fischer	Detroit Lions	C	—
1944	27	276	Joe Golding (Note: Joe Golding was drafted in 1944 by the Brooklyn Tigers (276th overall) and in 1946 by the Chicago Cardinals (31st overall).)	Brooklyn Tigers	B	—
1945	3	21	W. G. Wooten	Cleveland Rams	E	—
1945	18	180	Lee Kennon	Cleveland Rams	T	—
1945	25	260	Stan Green	Detroit Lions	T	—
1945	28	288	Don Fauble	Brooklyn Tigers	B	—
1946	5	31	Joe Golding	Chicago Cardinals	B	—
1946	6	42	Thurman Tigart	Boston Yanks	G	—
1946	15	133	Tom Tallchief	Pittsburgh Steelers	T	—
1946	23	220	Derald Lebow	Los Angeles Rams	B	—
1946	32	300	John West	Los Angeles Rams	B	—
1947	3	15	John Rapacz	Boston Yanks	C	—
1947	5	31	Buddy Burris	Green Bay Packers	G	—
1947	11	90	Dave Wallace	Chicago Cardinals	B	—
1947	12	101	Charley Sarratt	Philadelphia Eagles	B	—
1947	14	122	Jack Mitchell	Green Bay Packers	B	—
1947	22	201	Wade Walker	Chicago Cardinals	T	—
1947	27	255	Bill Morris	Chicago Bears	E	—
1948	17	149	Nute Trotter	Boston Yanks	T	—
1948	18	158	Ray Pearcy	Washington Redskins	C	—
1949	7	62	Myrl Greathouse	Chicago Cardinals	B	—
1949	23	225	Jim Owens	Pittsburgh Steelers	E	—
1950	1	6	George Thomas	Washington Redskins	B	—
1950	1	12	Stan West^{‡}	Los Angeles Rams	G	NFL Champion (1951); Pro Bowl (1952, 1953)
1950	7	82	Leon Manley	Green Bay Packers	G	—
1950	14	177	Dee Andros	Chicago Cardinals	G	—
1950	20	250	Darrell Royal	New York Yanks	B	—
1950	21	265	George Brewer	Detroit Lions	B	—
1951	1	4	Leon Heath	Washington Redskins	B	—
1951	8	95	Clair Mayes	Chicago Bears	G	—
1951	9	107	Nolan Lang	Los Angeles Rams	B	—
1951	11	128	Frankie Anderson	Detroit Lions	E	—
1951	19	229	Ed Lisak	Chicago Bears	B	—
1951	23	271	Jim Owens	Chicago Cardinals	E	—
1952	2	17	Jim Weatherall*	Philadelphia Eagles	T	Pro Bowl (1956, 1957)
1952	16	192	Ed Rowland	Cleveland Browns	T	—
1953	1	2	Billy Vessels	Baltimore Colts	RB	—
1953	2	22	Eddie Crowder	New York Giants	QB	—
1953	3	26	Buck McPhail	Baltimore Colts	B	—
1953	4	38	Tom Catlin^{†}	Baltimore Colts	C	NFL Champion (1954)
1953	15	177	Dick Bowman	New York Giants	G	—
1953	15	180	Tom Carroll	Los Angeles Rams	B	—
1954	2	16	Larry Grigg	Baltimore Colts	B	—
1954	10	116	Marrill Green	Washington Redskins	B	—
1954	14	164	Roger Nelson	Washington Redskins	T	—
1954	17	195	J. D. Roberts	Green Bay Packers	G	—
1954	30	355	Juel Sweatte	Pittsburgh Steelers	B	—
1955	1	2	Max Boydston	Chicago Cardinals	E	—
1955	1	13	Kurt Burris	Cleveland Browns	C	—
1955	3	29	Buddy Leake	Green Bay Packers	B	—
1955	16	182	Bob Herndon	Chicago Cardinals	B	—
1955	18	217	Steve Champlin	Cleveland Browns	T	—
1955	22	263	Carl Allison	Detroit Lions	B	—
1956	4	44	Cecil Morris	Green Bay Packers	G	—
1956	6	68	Bob Burris	Green Bay Packers	B	—
1956	13	149	Bo Bolinger	Chicago Cardinals	G	—
1956	20	241	Joe Mobra	Cleveland Browns	E	—
1957	1	10	Jerry Tubbs*	Chicago Cardinals	C	Pro Bowl (1963)
1957	3	31	Tommy McDonald^{‡}	Philadelphia Eagles	WR	NFL Champion (1960); Pro Bowl (1958–1962, 1965)Pro Football Hall of Fame (1998)
1957	5	50	Jimmy Harris	Philadelphia Eagles	QB	—
1957	6	65	Billy Pricer^{†}	Baltimore Colts	B	NFL Champion (1958, 1959)
1957	7	75	Ed Gray	Los Angeles Rams	T	—
1957	12	142	Bob Derrick	Chicago Cardinals	B	—
1957	28	336	Tom Emerson	Chicago Bears	G	—
1958	2	19	Clendon Thomas*	Los Angeles Rams	B	Pro Bowl (1963)
1958	3	32	Bill Krisher	Pittsburgh Steelers	G	—
1958	14	164	Doyle Jennings	Pittsburgh Steelers	T	—
1958	18	215	Dennit Morris^{†}	San Francisco 49ers	B	AFL Champion (1960, 1961)
1959	1	5	Dave Baker*	San Francisco 49ers	QB	Pro Bowl (1959)
1959	2	17	Bob Harrison	San Francisco 49ers	C	—
1959	20	237	Ross Coyle	Los Angeles Rams	E	—
1960	2	19	Prentice Gautt	Cleveland Browns^{NFL}	RB	—
1960	10	119	Bobby Boyd*	Baltimore Colts^{NFL}	DB	Pro Bowl (1964, 1968)
1960	20	233	Gilmer Lewis	Green Bay Packers^{NFL}	T	—
1961	4	51	Ron Hartline	Detroit Lions^{NFL}	RB	—
1961	6	80	Mike McClellan (Note: Mike McClellan was drafted in 1961 by the San Francisco 49ers (80th overall) and in 1962 by the New York Titans (237th overall).)	San Francisco 49ers^{NFL}	B	—
1961	14	195	Phil Loman (Note: Phil Loman was drafted in 1961 by the Cleveland Browns (195th overall) and in 1962 by the San Diego Chargers (272nd overall).)	Cleveland Browns^{NFL}	C	—
1961	30	237	Mike McClellan	New York Titans^{AFL}	B	—
1961	34	272	Phil Loman	San Diego Chargers^{AFL}	C	—
1963	8	101	Jim Cook	St. Louis Cardinals^{NFL}	G	—
1963	9	116	Dennis Ward (Note: Dennis Ward was drafted in 1963 by the Philadelphia Eagles of the NFL (116th overall) and the Kansas City Chiefs of the AFL (104th overall).)	Philadelphia Eagles^{NFL}	T	—
1963	13	104	Dennis Ward	Kansas City Chiefs^{AFL}	T	—
1963	15	118	Joe Don Looney (Note: Joe Don Looney was drafted in 1963 by the Houston Oilers (118th overall) and in 1964 by both the New York Giants of the NFL (12th overall) and the Kansas City Chiefs of the AFL (44th overall).)	Houston Oilers^{AFL}	RB	—
1963	14	185	Paul Lea (Note: Paul Lea was drafted in 1963 by the St. Louis Cardinals of the NFL (185th overall) and the Houston Oilers of the AFL (143rd overall).)	St. Louis Cardinals^{NFL}	B	—
1963	18	143	Paul Lea	Houston Oilers^{AFL}	B	—
1964	1	12	Joe Don Looney	New York Giants^{NFL}	RB	—
1964	6	44	Joe Don Looney	Kansas City Chiefs^{AFL}	RB	—
1964	11	152	Glen Condren (Note: Glen Condren was drafted in 1964 by the New York Giants of the NFL (152nd overall) and the New York Jets of the AFL (147th overall).)	New York Giants^{NFL}	T	—
1964	19	147	Glen Condren	New York Jets^{AFL}	T	—
1964	14	189	John Garrett (Note: John Garrett was drafted in 1964 by the Los Angeles Rams of the NFL (189th overall) and the Houston Oilers of the AFL (190th overall).)	Los Angeles Rams^{NFL}	LB	—
1964	24	190	John Garrett	Houston Oilers^{AFL}	LB	—
1965	2	23	Lance Rentzel (Note: Lance Rentzel was drafted in 1965 by the Minnesota Vikings of the NFL (23rd overall) and the Buffalo Bills of the AFL (48th overall).)	Minnesota Vikings^{NFL}	WR	—
1965	6	48	Lance Rentzel	Buffalo Bills^{AFL}	WR	—
1965	2	28	Ralph Neely^{‡} (Note: Ralph Neely was drafted in 1965 by the Baltimore Colts of the NFL (28th overall) and the Houston Oilers of the AFL (15th overall).)	Baltimore Colts^{NFL}	T	Super Bowl Champion (VI, XII); Pro Bowl (1967, 1969)
1965	2	15	Ralph Neely^{‡}	Houston Oilers^{AFL}	T	Super Bowl Champion (VI, XII); Pro Bowl (1967, 1969)
1965	5	67	John Flynn	Detroit Lions^{NFL}	E	—
1965	6	79	Jim Grisham (Note: Jim Grisham was drafted in 1965 by the Minnesota Vikings of the NFL (79th overall) and the Houston Oilers of the AFL (130th overall).)	Minnesota Vikings^{NFL}	B	—
1965	17	130	Jim Grisham	Houston Oilers^{AFL}	B	—
1965	8	60	Rick McCurdy	New York Jets^{AFL}	DE	—
1965	14	193	Larry Brown	Detroit Lions^{NFL}	B	—
1965	18	250	Ed McQuarters	St. Louis Cardinals^{NFL}	G	—
1966	1	8	Carl McAdams^{†} (Note: Carl McAdams was drafted in 1966 by the St. Louis Cardinals of the NFL (8th overall) and the New York Jets of the AFL (22nd overall).)	St. Louis Cardinals^{NFL}	LB	Super Bowl champion (III)
1966	3	22	Carl McAdams^{†}	New York Jets^{AFL}	LB	Super Bowl champion (III)
1966	10	149	Mike Ringer (Note: Mike Ringer was drafted in 1966 by the St. Louis Cardinals of the NFL (149th overall) and the Denver Broncos of the AFL (130th overall).)	St. Louis Cardinals^{NFL}	RB	—
1966	15	130	Mike Ringer	Denver Broncos^{AFL}	RB	—
1967	2	29	Jim Riley	Miami Dolphins	T	—
1967	3	80	Ben Hart	New Orleans Saints	RB	—
1967	4	96	James Roy Jackson	Oakland Raiders	WR	—
1967	9	237	Eugene Ross	New Orleans Saints	DB	—
1967	13	320	Tom Stidham	New York Giants	K	—
1968	8	199	Bob Kalsu	Buffalo Bills	T	—
1968	10	256	Granville Liggins	Detroit Lions	LB	—
1968	11	292	Ron Shotts	Detroit Lions	RB	—
1969	1	25	Eddie Hinton^{†}	Baltimore Colts	WR	Super Bowl champion (V)
1970	1	6	Steve Zabel	Philadelphia Eagles	TE	—
1970	1	13	Jim Files	New York Giants	LB	—
1970	1	19	Steve Owens*	Detroit Lions	RB	Pro Bowl (1971)
1970	5	116	Ken Mendenhall	Atlanta Falcons	C	—
1970	8	187	Jack Porter	New York Jets	G	—
1970	17	420	Joe Killingsworth	Boston Patriots	WR	—
1971	7	179	John Watson	San Francisco 49ers	T	—
1971	10	248	Steve Casteel	Cleveland Browns	LB	—
1971	17	427	Monty Johnson	Green Bay Packers	DB	—
1972	2	46	Jack Mildren	Baltimore Colts	DB	—
1972	8	191	Al Qualls	Baltimore Colts	LB	—
1972	9	234	Roy Bell	Dallas Cowboys	RB	—
1972	17	417	John Shelley	Buffalo Bills	DB	—
1973	2	29	Derland Moore	New Orleans Saints	DE	—
1973	2	30	Greg Pruitt^{‡}	Cleveland Browns	RB	Super Bowl Champion (XVIII); Pro Bowl (1973, 1974, 1976, 1977, 1983)
1973	2	43	Al Chandler	Cincinnati Bengals	TE	—
1973	2	44	Leon Crosswhite	Detroit Lions	RB	—
1973	4	101	Joe Wylie	Oakland Raiders	WR	—
1973	5	109	Tom Brahaney	St. Louis Cardinals	C	—
1973	7	164	Ken Jones	St. Louis Cardinals	T	—
1973	10	238	Dan Ruster	New England Patriots	DB	—
1973	12	292	Dean Unruh	St. Louis Cardinals	T	—
1973	14	342	Ray Hamilton	New England Patriots	LB	—
1973	17	424	Larry Roach	Chicago Bears	DB	—
1974	4	85	Durwood Keeton	St. Louis Cardinals	DB	—
1974	5	110	Gary Baccus	New York Jets	LB	—
1974	5	119	Clyde Powers	New York Giants	DB	—
1974	9	227	Ken Pope	Oakland Raiders	DB	—
1974	12	296	Eddie Foster	New England Patriots	T	—
1974	14	349	David Smith	Philadelphia Eagles	LB	—
1974	16	399	Lucious Selmon	New England Patriots	DT	—
1975	2	41	Rod Shoate	New England Patriots	LB	—
1975	4	82	Tony Peters^{†}	Cleveland Browns	DB	Super Bowl Champion (XVII)
1975	4	96	Randy Hughes^{†}	Dallas Cowboys	DB	Super Bowl Champion (XII)
1975	5	113	Kyle Davis	Dallas Cowboys	C	—
1975	6	134	John Carroll	San Diego Chargers	WR	—
1975	8	189	Wayne Hoffman	Kansas City Chiefs	T	—
1975	10	239	Clyde Russell	Miami Dolphins	RB	—
1975	14	355	Jerry Arnold	Denver Broncos	G	—
1975	15	370	John Roush	San Diego Chargers	G	—
1975	15	372	Grant Burget	New Orleans Saints	RB	—
1976	1	1	Lee Roy Selmon*	Tampa Bay Buccaneers	DE	Pro Bowl (1979–1984)Pro Football Hall of Fame (1995)
1976	1	4	Joe Washington^{‡}	San Diego Chargers	RB	Super Bowl Champion (XVII); Pro Bowl (1979)
1976	1	11	Billy Brooks	Cincinnati Bengals	WR	—
1976	2	60	Dewey Selmon	Tampa Bay Buccaneers	DT	—
1976	4	96	Tinker Owens	New Orleans Saints	WR	—
1976	5	144	Jimbo Elrod	Kansas City Chiefs	LB	—
1976	8	212	Tony DiRienzo	San Diego Chargers	K	—
1977	2	44	Horace Ivory	New England Patriots	RB	—
1977	3	82	Sidney Brown	New England Patriots	DB	—
1977	4	88	Mike Vaughan	New York Giants	T	—
1977	4	105	Jerry Anderson	Cincinnati Bengals	DB	—
1977	10	260	Jim Culbreath	Green Bay Packers	RB	—
1978	1	20	Elvis Peacock	Los Angeles Rams	RB	—
1978	3	84	Dave Hudgens	Dallas Cowboys	T	—
1978	7	178	Karl Baldischwiler	Miami Dolphins	T	—
1978	11	289	Richard Murray	Detroit Lions	DT	—
1979	2	33	Greg Roberts	Tampa Bay Buccaneers	G	—
1979	2	38	Reggie Mathis	New Orleans Saints	LB	—
1979	2	47	Sam Claphan	Cleveland Browns	T	—
1979	3	72	Kenny King^{‡}	Houston Oilers	RB	Super Bowl Champion (XV, XVIII); Pro Bowl (1980)
1979	4	90	Phil Tabor	New York Giants	DE	—
1979	5	122	Victor Hicks	Los Angeles Rams	TE	—
1979	6	143	Daryl Hunt	Houston Oilers	LB	—
1979	6	144	Thomas Lott	St. Louis Cardinals	RB	—
1979	7	189	Uwe von Schamann	Miami Dolphins	K	—
1979	12	320	Reggie Kinlaw^{†}	Oakland Raiders	DT	Super Bowl Champion (XV, XVIII)
1980	1	1	Billy Sims*	Detroit Lions	RB	Pro Bowl (1980–1982)
1980	1	26	George Cumby	Green Bay Packers	LB	—
1980	2	40	Darrol Ray	New York Jets	DB	—
1980	2	56	John Goodman	Pittsburgh Steelers	DE	—
1980	4	87	Fred Nixon	Green Bay Packers	WR	—
1980	5	130	Paul Tabor	Green Bay Packers	C	—
1980	7	179	Bud Hebert	New York Giants	DB	—
1980	9	235	Barry Burget	New England Patriots	LB	—
1980	11	284	Mike Babb	Atlanta Falcons	DB	—
1981	1	13	David Overstreet	Miami Dolphins	RB	—
1981	1	17	Keith Gary	Pittsburgh Steelers	DE	—
1981	4	88	Steve Rhodes	St. Louis Cardinals	WR	—
1981	4	105	Richard Turner	Green Bay Packers	DT	—
1981	5	112	Louis Oubre	New Orleans Saints	T	—
1981	8	204	Ken Sitton	Baltimore Colts	DB	—
1981	8	213	J. C. Watts	New York Jets	QB	—
1981	11	282	Forrest Valora	Green Bay Packers	QB	—
1982	3	67	Bill Bechtold	Los Angeles Rams	C	—
1982	5	113	Terry Crouch	Baltimore Colts	G	—
1982	8	207	Mike Reilly	Los Angeles Rams	LB	—
1982	9	241	Lyndle Byford	Kansas City Chiefs	T	—
1983	6	142	Steve Haworth	Houston Oilers	DB	—
1983	7	185	Weldon Ledbetter	Tampa Bay Buccaneers	RB	—
1983	9	248	Stanley Wilson	Cincinnati Bengals	RB	—
1984s	1	14	Dwight Drane (Note: Dwight Drane was the 14th pick in the first round of the 1984 supplemental draft.)	Buffalo Bills	DB	—
1984	1	9	Rick Bryan	Atlanta Falcons	DT	—
1984	1	14	Jackie Shipp	Miami Dolphins	LB	—
1984	2	31	Bob Slater	Washington Redskins	DT	—
1984	2	32	Scott Case^{‡}	Atlanta Falcons	DB	Super Bowl Champion (XXX); Pro Bowl (1988)
1984	2	32	Darryl Goodlow (Note: Darryl Goodlow was the 4th pick in the second round of the 1984 supplemental draft.)	Philadelphia Eagles	LB	—
1984	2	36	Thomas Benson	Atlanta Falcons	LB	—
1984	12	325	Paul Parker	St. Louis Cardinals	G	—
1985	1	26	Steve Sewell	Denver Broncos	RB	—
1985	4	85	Buster Rhymes	Minnesota Vikings	WR	—
1985	7	189	Danny Bradley	Los Angeles Rams	RB	—
1985	8	199	Chuck Thomas^{†}	Houston Oilers	C	Super Bowl Champion (XXIII, XXIV)
1985	12	316	Jim Rockford	Tampa Bay Buccaneers	DB	—
1986	1	2	Tony Casillas^{†}	Atlanta Falcons	DT	Super Bowl Champion (XXVII, XXVIII)
1986	2	40	Kevin Murphy	Tampa Bay Buccaneers	LB	—
1986	5	116	Jeff Tupper	St. Louis Cardinals	DE	—
1986	12	327	Marcus Dupree	Los Angeles Rams	RB	—
1987s	1	1	Brian Bosworth (Note: Brian Bosworth was the 1st pick in the first round of the 1987 supplemental draft.)	Seattle Seahawks	LB	—
1987	5	120	Steve Bryan	Chicago Bears	DE	—
1987	5	133	Spencer Tillman^{†}	Houston Oilers	RB	Super Bowl Champion (XXIV)
1987	8	221	Paul Migliazzo	Chicago Bears	LB	—
1988	1	5	Rickey Dixon	Cincinnati Bengals	DB	—
1988	1	13	Keith Jackson^{‡}	Philadelphia Eagles	TE	Super Bowl Champion (XXXI); Pro Bowl (1988–1990, 1992, 1993, 1996)
1988	2	51	Dante Jones	Chicago Bears	LB	—
1988	3	67	Mark Hutson	Dallas Cowboys	G	—
1988	4	99	Greg Johnson	Miami Dolphins	T	—
1988	4	106	Lydell Carr	New Orleans Saints	RB	—
1988	5	116	Darrell Reed	Green Bay Packers	LB	—
1988	5	133	Troy Johnson	Chicago Bears	LB	—
1988	6	148	Jon Phillips	Phoenix Cardinals	G	—
1988	6	164	Derrick White	Minnesota Vikings	DB	—
1988	7	171	Derrick Crudup	Los Angeles Raiders	DB	—
1988	7	189	Caesar Rentie	Chicago Bears	T	—
1988	8	200	Patrick Collins	Green Bay Packers	RB	—
1989	6	152	Anthony Stafford	Denver Broncos	WR	—
1989	6	165	Eric Mitchell	New England Patriots	RB	—
1989	8	216	Tony Woods	Chicago Bears	DT	—
1989	12	333	Anthony Phillips	Chicago Bears	G	—
1990	6	162	Kevin Thompson	Philadelphia Eagles	DB	—
1990	9	230	Leon Perry	Los Angeles Raiders	RB	—
1990	12	330	Ken McMichel	Phoenix Cardinals	DB	—
1991	4	103	Adrian Cooper	Pittsburgh Steelers	TE	—
1991	5	114	James Goode	Atlanta Falcons	LB	—
1991	7	169	Frank Blevins	Green Bay Packers	LB	—
1991	8	209	Scott Evans	Phoenix Cardinals	DT	—
1991	10	272	Tom Backes	Chicago Bears	DE	—
1992	5	133	Joe Bowden	Houston Oilers	LB	—
1992	6	146	Brian Brauninger	Phoenix Cardinals	T	—
1992	6	152	Mike Gaddis	Minnesota Vikings	RB	—
1992	6	153	Stacey Dillard	New York Giants	DT	—
1992	6	158	Terry Ray	Atlanta Falcons	DB	—
1992	8	197	Jason Belser	Indianapolis Colts	DB	—
1992	10	269	Corey Mayfield	San Francisco 49ers	DE	—
1992	12	326	Brandon Houston	Philadelphia Eagles	T	—
1992	12	331	Chris Wilson	Chicago Bears	LB	—
1993	7	178	Darnell Walker	Atlanta Falcons	DB	—
1993	7	190	Joey Mickey^{†}	Philadelphia Eagles	TE	Super Bowl Champion (XXVIII)
1994	2	54	Aubrey Beavers	Miami Dolphins	LB	—
1994	6	167	Rickey Brady	Los Angeles Rams	TE	—
1996	1	5	Cedric Jones	New York Giants	DE	—
1996	3	83	Jerald Moore	Arizona Cardinals	RB	—
1996	4	122	Darrius Johnson^{†}	Denver Broncos	DB	Super Bowl Champion (XXXII, XXXIII)
1996	5	161	Harry Stamps	Arizona Cardinals	T	—
1996	6	207	Wendell Davis	Dallas Cowboys	DB	—
1996	7	247	J. R. Conrad	New England Patriots	T	—
1997	5	149	Barron Tanner	Miami Dolphins	DT	—
1997	6	199	Rod Manuel	Pittsburgh Steelers	DE	—
1998	2	48	Stephen Alexander	Washington Redskins	TE	—
1998	5	124	Martin Chase	Baltimore Ravens	DT	—
1998	5	152	Travian Smith	Oakland Raiders	LB	—
1998	6	164	Sammy Williams^{†}	Baltimore Ravens	T	Super Bowl Champion (XXXV)
1999	2	60	Jermaine Fazande	San Diego Chargers	RB	—
1999	5	159	De'Mond Parker	Green Bay Packers	RB	—
1999	6	173	Kelly Gregg^{†}	Cincinnati Bengals	DT	Super Bowl Champion (XXXV)
2000	1	20	Stockar McDougle	Detroit Lions	T	—
2000	2	54	William Bartee	Kansas City Chiefs	DB	—
2001	3	72	Torrance Marshall	Green Bay Packers	LB	—
2001	6	177	Josh Heupel	Miami Dolphins	QB	—
2002	1	8	Roy Williams*	Dallas Cowboys	DB	Pro Bowl (2003–2007)
2002	3	77	Rocky Calmus	Tennessee Titans	LB	—
2003	1	28	Andre Woolfolk	Tennessee Titans	DB	—
2003	4	108	Quentin Griffin	Denver Broncos	RB	—
2003	6	189	Jimmy Wilkerson	Kansas City Chiefs	DE	—
2003	7	223	Trent Smith	Baltimore Ravens	TE	—
2004	1	14	Tommie Harris*	Chicago Bears	DT	Pro Bowl (2005–2007)
2004	2	37	Teddy Lehman	Detroit Lions	LB	—
2004	3	76	Derrick Strait	New York Jets	DB	—
2005	1	13	Jammal Brown‡	New Orleans Saints	T	Super Bowl Champion (XLIV); Pro Bowl (2006, 2008)
2005	1	22	Mark Clayton	Baltimore Ravens	WR	—
2005	2	34	Brodney Pool	Cleveland Browns	DB	—
2005	2	39	Mark Bradley	Chicago Bears	WR	—
2005	2	53	Dan Cody	Baltimore Ravens	DE	—
2005	3	96	Brandon Jones	Tennessee Titans	WR	—
2005	4	103	Antonio Perkins	Cleveland Browns	DB	—
2005	5	141	Donte Nicholson	Tampa Bay Buccaneers	DB	—
2005	5	167	Mike Hawkins	Green Bay Packers	DB	—
2005	5	168	Lance Mitchell	Arizona Cardinals	LB	—
2005	6	177	Wes Sims	San Diego Chargers	G	—
2006	1	23	Davin Joseph*	Tampa Bay Buccaneers	G	Pro Bowl (2008, 2011)
2006	2	56	Chris Chester	Baltimore Ravens	G	—
2006	3	73	Dusty Dvoracek	Chicago Bears	DT	—
2006	3	78	Travis Wilson	Cleveland Browns	WR	—
2006	3	80	Clint Ingram	Jacksonville Jaguars	LB	—
2006	6	195	J. D. Runnels	Chicago Bears	FB	—
2007	1	7	Adrian Peterson*	Minnesota Vikings	RB	Pro Bowl (2007–2010, 2012, 2013, 2015)
2007	6	176	Rufus Alexander	Minnesota Vikings	LB	—
2007	7	239	C. J. Ah You	Buffalo Bills	DE	—
2008	2	37	Curtis Lofton	Atlanta Falcons	LB	—
2008	2	51	Malcolm Kelly	Washington Redskins	WR	—
2008	3	75	Reggie Smith	San Francisco 49ers	DB	—
2008	7	240	Allen Patrick	Baltimore Ravens	RB	—
2009	2	54	Phil Loadholt	Minnesota Vikings	T	—
2009	3	99	Juaquin Iglesias	Chicago Bears	WR	—
2009	5	147	Nic Harris	Buffalo Bills	DB	—
2009	5	163	Duke Robinson	Carolina Panthers	G	—
2009	7	229	Manuel Johnson	Dallas Cowboys	WR	—
2010	1	1	Sam Bradford	St. Louis Rams	QB	—
2010	1	3	Gerald McCoy*	Tampa Bay Buccaneers	DT	Pro Bowl (2012–2015)
2010	1	4	Trent Williams*	Washington Redskins	T	Pro Bowl (2012–2017, 2020–2021)
2010	1	21	Jermaine Gresham*	Cincinnati Bengals	TE	Pro Bowl (2011, 2012)
2010	4	121	Keenan Clayton	Philadelphia Eagles	LB	—
2010	5	135	Dominique Franks	Atlanta Falcons	DB	—
2010	5	162	Brody Eldridge	Indianapolis Colts	TE	—
2011	3	71	DeMarco Murray*	Dallas Cowboys	RB	Pro Bowl (2013, 2014)
2011	4	108	Quinton Carter	Denver Broncos	DB	—
2011	7	229	Jonathan Nelson	St. Louis Rams	DB	—
2011	7	247	Jeremy Beal	Denver Broncos	DE	—
2012	2	54	Ryan Broyles	Detroit Lions	WR	—
2012	3	74	Donald Stephenson	Kansas City Chiefs	T	—
2012	3	80	Jamell Fleming	Arizona Cardinals	DB	—
2012	4	103	Frank Alexander	Carolina Panthers	DE	—
2012	4	125	Ronnell Lewis	Detroit Lions	LB	—
2012	6	186	James Hanna	Dallas Cowboys	TE	—
2012	7	223	Travis Lewis	Detroit Lions	LB	—
2013	1	4	Lane Johnson^{‡}	Philadelphia Eagles	T	Super Bowl Champion (XLII); Pro Bowl (2017)
2013	4	115	Landry Jones	Pittsburgh Steelers	QB	—
2013	5	144	Kenny Stills	New Orleans Saints	WR	—
2013	6	186	Justin Brown	Pittsburgh Steelers	WR	—
2013	6	205	Stacy McGee	Oakland Raiders	DT	—
2013	7	239	David King	Philadelphia Eagles	DE	—
2014	4	104	Jalen Saunders	New York Jets	WR	—
2014	4	114	Aaron Colvin	Jacksonville Jaguars	DB	—
2014	7	242	Corey Nelson^{†}	Denver Broncos	LB	Super Bowl Champion (50)
2014	7	245	Trey Millard	San Francisco 49ers	FB	—
2015	2	52	Jordan Phillips	Miami Dolphins	DT	—
2015	3	97	Geneo Grissom^{†}	New England Patriots	DE	Super Bowl Champion (XLI)
2015	4	102	Daryl Williams	Carolina Panthers	T	—
2015	4	117	Blake Bell^{†}	San Francisco 49ers	TE	Super Bowl Champion (LIV)
2015	6	185	Tyrus Thompson	Minnesota Vikings	T	—
2015	6	206	Aaron Ripkowski	Green Bay Packers	FB	—
2016	2	40	Sterling Shepard	New York Giants	WR	—
2016	4	101	Charles Tapper	Dallas Cowboys	DE	—
2016	5	141	Zack Sanchez	Carolina Panthers	DB	—
2016	6	183	Devante Bond	Tampa Bay Buccaneers	LB	—
2017	2	48	Joe Mixon	Cincinnati Bengals	RB	Pro Bowl (2021)
2017	4	110	Dede Westbrook	Jacksonville Jaguars	WR	—
2017	4	114	Samaje Perine	Washington Redskins	RB	—
2017	6	193	Jordan Evans	Cincinnati Bengals	LB	—
2018	1	1	Baker Mayfield	Cleveland Browns	QB	—
2018	3	83	Orlando Brown*	Baltimore Ravens	T	Pro Bowl (2019, 2020, 2021)
2018	3	86	Mark Andrews*	Baltimore Ravens	TE	Pro Bowl (2019, 2021)
2018	5	160	Ogbonnia Okoronkwo^{†}	Los Angeles Rams	DE	Super Bowl Champion (LVI)
2019	1	1	Kyler Murray*	Arizona Cardinals	QB	Pro Bowl (2020, 2021)
2019	1	25	Marquise Brown	Baltimore Ravens	WR	—
2019	2	38	Cody Ford	Buffalo Bills	T	—
2019	3	97	Bobby Evans^{†}	Los Angeles Rams	T	Super Bowl Champion (LVI)
2019	4	114	Dru Samia	Minnesota Vikings	G	—
2019	4	123	Ben Powers	Baltimore Ravens	G	—
2019	5	170	Austin Seibert	Cleveland Browns	K	—
2019	6	211	Rodney Anderson	Cincinnati Bengals	RB	—
2020	1	17	CeeDee Lamb*	Dallas Cowboys	WR	Pro Bowl (2021)
2020	1	23	Kenneth Murray	Los Angeles Chargers	LB	—
2020	2	53	Jalen Hurts	Philadelphia Eagles	QB	Super Bowl Champion (LIX); Super Bowl MVP (LIX); Second-team All-Pro (2022); Pro Bowl (2022, 2023)
2020	3	82	Neville Gallimore	Dallas Cowboys	DT	—
2021	2	63	Creed Humphrey	Kansas City Chiefs	C	Super Bowl Champion (LVII, LVIII); Second-team All-Pro (2022); Pro Bowl (2023, 2024)
2021	3	96	Ronnie Perkins	New England Patriots	DE	—
2021	4	120	Rhamondre Stevenson	New England Patriots	RB	—
2021	4	137	Tre Brown	Seattle Seahawks	DB	—
2021	7	137	Tre Norwood	Pittsburgh Steelers	DB	—
2022	2	64	Nik Bonitto	Denver Broncos	LB	—
2022	3	66	Brian Asamoah	Minnesota Vikings	LB	—
2022	4	108	Perrion Winfrey	Cleveland Browns	DT	—
2022	5	152	Delarrin Turner-Yell	Denver Broncos	DB	—
2022	6	202	Michael Woods II	Cleveland Browns	WR	—
2022	7	223	Isaiah Thomas	Cleveland Browns	DE	—
2022	7	257	Marquis Hayes	Arizona Cardinals	G	—
2023	1	27	Anton Harrison	Jacksonville Jaguars	T	—
2023	2	63	Marvin Mims	Denver Broncos	WR	—
2023	3	92	Wanya Morris	Kansas City Chiefs	T	—
2023	5	172	Eric Gray	New York Giants	RB	—
2023	7	247	Brayden Willis	San Francisco 49ers	TE	—
2024	1	29	Tyler Guyton	Dallas Cowboys	T	—
2024	6	177	Walter Rouse	Minnesota Vikings	T	—
2024	7	234	Jonah Laulu	Indianapolis Colts	T	—
2025	4	112	Danny Stutsman	New Orleans Saints	LB	—
2025	4	118	Billy Bowman Jr.	Atlanta Falcons	S	—
2026	2	40	R Mason Thomas	Kansas City Chiefs	DE	—
2026	4	106	Febechi Nwaiwu	Houston Texans	G	—
2026	4	107	Gracen Halton	San Francisco 49ers	DT	—
2026	4	134	Kendal Daniels	Atlanta Falcons	LB	—
2026	7	224	Robert Spears-Jennings	Pittsburgh Steelers	S	—
2026	7	225	Jaren Kanak	Tennessee Titans	TE	—
2026	7	254	Deion Burks	Indianapolis Colts	WR	—
