= Gaylord Family Oklahoma Memorial Stadium =

Football stadium in Norman, Oklahoma, US

Gaylord Family – Oklahoma Memorial Stadium
- "Owen Field" "The Palace On The Prairie"
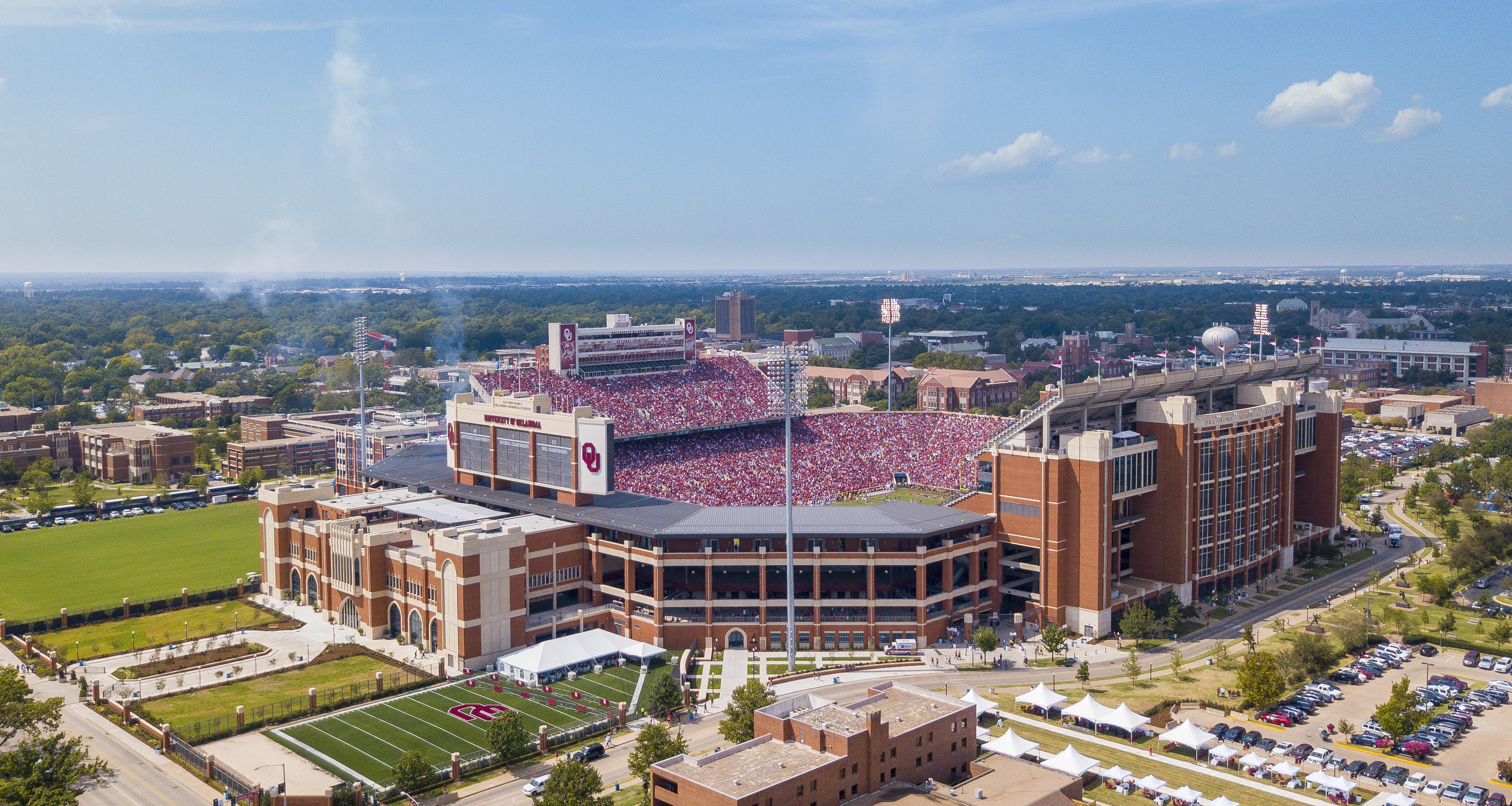
- The stadium with the newly finished south entrance and enclosed south side in 2017

- Location in Oklahoma Location in the United States
- Former names: Oklahoma Memorial Stadium (1923–2002)
- Address: 1185 Asp Ave.
- Location: Norman, Oklahoma
- Coordinates: 35°12′21″N 97°26′33″W
- Owner: University of Oklahoma
- Operator: University of Oklahoma
- Capacity: 80,126 (since 2019)
- Surface: Grass: 1923–1969; AstroTurf: 1970–1980; Superturf: 1981–1993; Bermudagrass: 1994–present
- Record attendance: 88,308 (November 11, 2017 vs. TCU)

Construction
- Groundbreaking: 1922
- Opened: October 20, 1923; 102 years ago
- Renovated: 1980, 1997, 2003, 2016
- Expanded: 1925, 1929, 1949, 1957, 1974, 1980, 2003, 2016
- Cost: $293,000 ($5.36 million in 2025 dollars) $125 million (renovations)
- Architects: Layton & Hicks HOK Sport/360 Architecture (renovations)
- Structural engineer: Walter P Moore (renovations)

Tenant
- Oklahoma Sooners (NCAA) (1923–present)

Website
- soonersports.com/memorialstadium

Gaylord Family Oklahoma Memorial Stadium, also known as Owen Field or The Palace on the Prairie, is the football stadium on the campus of the University of Oklahoma in Norman, Oklahoma, US. It serves as the home of the Oklahoma Sooners football team. The official seating capacity of the stadium, following renovations before the start of the 2019 season, is 80,126, making it the 41st largest stadium in the world, the 15th largest college stadium in the United States and the ninth largest in the Southeastern Conference.

The stadium is a bowl-shaped facility with its long axis oriented north/south, with both the north and south ends enclosed. The south end has only been enclosed since the 2015–2016 off-season, when it was renovated as part of a US$160 million project. Visitor seating is in the south end zone and the southern sections of the east side. The student seating sections are in the east stands, surrounding the 350-member Pride of Oklahoma band which sits in section 29, between the 20- and 35-yard lines. The Sooners' bench was once located on the east side with the students, but the home bench was moved to the west side in the mid-1990s.

== Early history ==
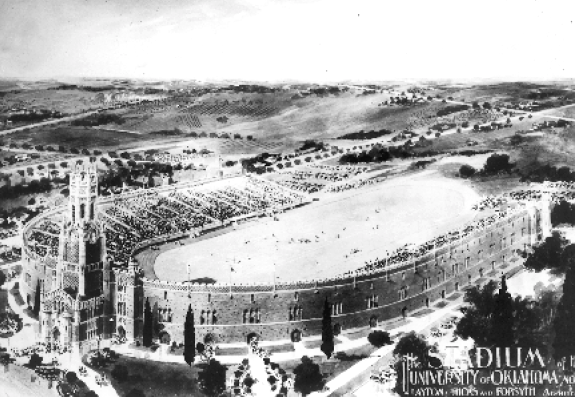
An early drawing of the stadium. This idea was scrapped for a simpler, cheaper stadium

The first game played at the current stadium site was in 1923, which OU considers to be the stadium's opening date., with the Sooners prevailing over Washington University, 62–7. Until 1925 seating consisted of an approximately 500-seat bleacher area on the east side. The first permanent seating was built in 1925, when 16,000 seats were built on the west side of the site–corresponding to the lower level of the current facility's west grandstands. The new stadium was named "Oklahoma Memorial Stadium" in honor of university students and personnel who died during World War I. The facility was constructed at an approximate cost of $293,000, and coach Bennie Owen helped raise the money; the playing surface was named Owen Field after him during the 1920s. The stadium as a whole has long been called Owen Field, but the field and the stadium are actually two separate entities with different names. There are two main reasons why the stadium was not originally a fully enclosed "bowl" like, for example, Michigan Stadium or the Rose Bowl. First, access to the three outdoor football practice fields, which are behind the south end zone seats, would have been restricted by completely enclosing the south end of the stadium. Secondly, any enclosure would have forced the baseball field, which shared its outfield with the practice fields until 1982, to shorten its left field line considerably.

More permanent seating was added, this time to the east side, in 1929. In 1949, the north end of the stadium was enclosed, the playing area was lowered six feet with the elimination of the running track around the field. This created a 55,000-seat "horseshoe," and the addition of south-end bleachers in 1957 brought capacity to just under 61,836 fans. AstroTurf replaced the natural grass field in 1970. The west side upper deck was added in 1975, featuring a lounge and a new press box, for a total capacity of 71,187 fans at a cost of about $5.7 million. Improved south end zone seating, including new coaches' offices and training facilities, was added in 1980 and the old turf was replaced with Superturf in 1981. The new turf was more or less a necessity as the old surface had become threadbare. With a few exceptions, these changes took place during or shortly after the Sooners' national championship seasons of 1950, 1955, 1956, 1974, and 1975 – all high times for Sooner sports.

== Lights, camera, football, money ==
Until the 1980s, the NCAA had a tight grip on television contracts for Division I-A college football games. Compared to the later abundance of college football games on television, only two (on rare occasions, three) college football games were televised each week, and the schedule of games was set in stone well in advance of the season opening. The NCAA reasoned that televised games cut into attendance, and more TV games would cost more money in lost gate receipts than could be gained with television contracts.

In the fall of 1981, OU and the University of Georgia sued the NCAA in federal court in Oklahoma City. In this class-action lawsuit on behalf of members of the College Football Association, the two schools alleged that the NCAA's contracts with ABC, NBC, and CBS violated the Sherman Antitrust Act by preventing colleges and conferences from selling their own product on the open market. The court agreed with the schools in 1982 and voided the NCAA's television contracts. The ruling was appealed by the NCAA and ultimately heard by the Supreme Court of the United States, (NCAA v. Board of Regents of the University of Oklahoma, 468 U.S. 85 (1984)), which upheld the lower court's decision.

Less than two years later, seven to ten games by the Sooners and the rest of Division I-A were televised. This presented a new problem for both the Sooners and Owen Field. At the time, Owen Field did not have permanent artificial lighting sufficient for television broadcasts at night, so that untelevised home games had to start in the morning or early afternoon so as to be completed by dark, because the cost of leasing a set of portable lights was too high for a game that would not earn enough revenue to pay for the lights. For all televised games, portable lights on trucks were rented, and the four or five portable light trucks often stayed on campus for weeks ready for the next televised game; the leasing costs reduced the university's revenue. True night games were difficult to play in Norman because of the amount of portable lighting needed to illuminate the field adequately for spectators to see the players, much less the light required for television. Until 1982 the university knew which games would be televised and could plan months ahead to lease the necessary lighting.

With the successful outcome of the court case against the NCAA, more late-afternoon and night games were scheduled in Norman, and television schedules changed during the season, requiring large portable light trucks to take up space on campus while waiting for the next televised game. Permanent television lights were not installed in the four corners of the stadium, along with a new south end zone video scoreboard to replace the antiquated main scoreboard, until 1997.

Owen Field switched back to natural grass, or Prescription Athletic Turf, from the aging Superturf in 1994, improving the field's drainage system in the process. The switch was necessary as the Superturf surface had deteriorated to an unplayable condition. The turf's poor condition is widely believed to have contributed to a crash of the Sooner Schooner during a 1993 game against Colorado. The return to natural grass in 1994 and the lighting and scoreboard installation in 1997 were the only major improvements to the stadium for nearly 20 years.

== 21st-century improvements ==
By 1999, the 75-year-old stadium was showing its age. Aside from the turf and lighting enhancements, the last substantial upgrade to the stadium had been the construction of the press box in 1975. The OU College of Architecture was housed under the west stands and in the north end zone, until other facilities became available in 1990. The east stands still had the original dirt flooring underneath the stands, making for a cloudy, dusty walk into the student and visitor seating sections. Restrooms were old and inadequate; paint was peeling off external walls and the areas under the stands (the east side in particular) were dark and smelled dusty.

Plans began in 1997 to upgrade most athletic department facilities, beginning with a five-year fundraising campaign. Then, unexpectedly, the Sooners won the BCS National Championship for the 2000 season. The university began to get more freshman applications than it could house due in large part to the football team's success. Along with other campus improvements such as more and better student housing, the refurbishment and expansion plan for the stadium was accelerated to be ready by the beginning of the 2003 season.

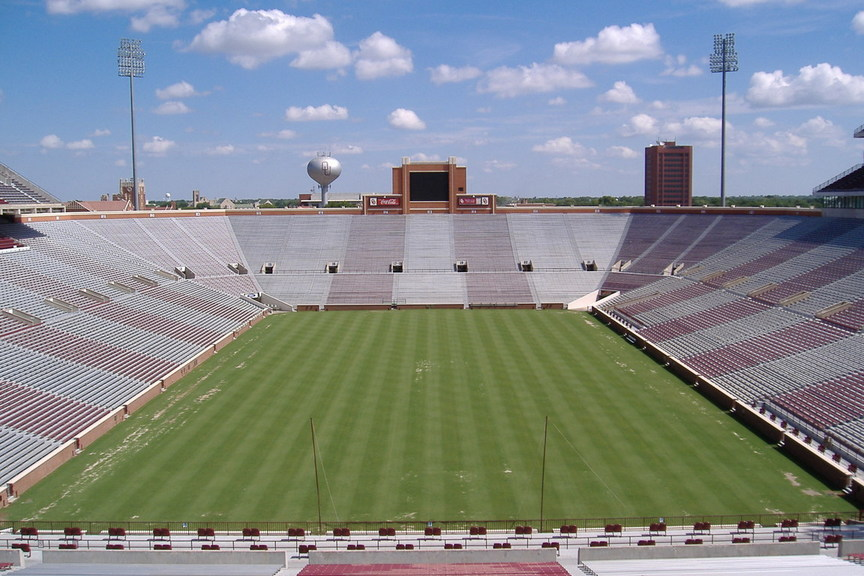
A view from the top row of the inside in 2005

In 2002, all seats were replaced and the north end zone scoreboard was dismantled in preparation for replacement. From 2003 to 2004, the video and audio systems were completely replaced, and new video scoreboards were placed at both end zones. The west side, long ignored except for the press box construction in 1975, received restroom and concession improvements. Most importantly, a street running east of the east stands was moved to allow for the construction of an upper deck with club seating for 2,500 and 27 suites on the east side, which increased the capacity of the stadium to 83,469. The renovation, led by architecture firms 360 Architecture and HOK Sport (now Populous), cost $54 million.

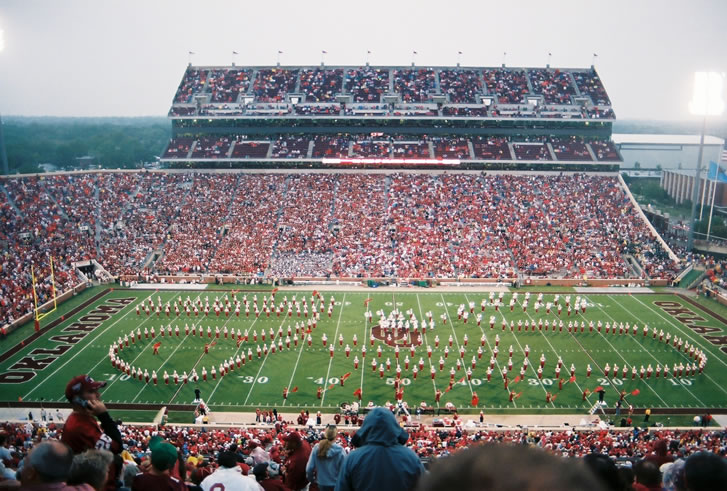
The east side of the stadium during halftime of the September 2, 2006 game between the Oklahoma Sooners and the UAB Blazers

The north and west entries were renovated to match the Cherokee Gothic look of most campus buildings, and other cosmetic enhancements were made to the press box. A reflecting pool just north of the stadium, filled in during the 1949 north end zone expansion, was restored in 2000. A new war memorial listing the names of Sooners killed while serving in the U.S. armed forces was placed next to the reflecting pool in 2003.

The basketball coaches' offices are located in the Lloyd Noble Center, but the rest of the OU athletic coaches' offices, the Athletic Director's office, and the OU Athletics administrators' offices are located in the north end of the stadium in the McClendon Center.

$12 million toward the $75 million cost of the stadium project was donated by Christy Gaylord Everest, then publisher of The Oklahoman and daughter of Edward K. Gaylord, in 2002. The stadium was renamed to its current name in honor of this gift. (The Gaylords donated a total of $50 million to the university around this time, including $22 million for a new building to house the College of Journalism.)

Rock band U2 performed a sold-out show at the stadium as a part of its 360° Tour on 18 October 2009.

=== Barry Switzer Center ===
The Barry Switzer Center housed football offices, the football locker room, equipment room, the Siegfried Strength and Conditioning Complex, the Freede Sports Medicine Facility and the Touchdown Club Legends Lobby. The Center was located at the south end of the stadium. It was dedicated on April 24, 1999, and named after OU's all-time winningest head football coach. During Summer 2015 the Switzer Center was demolished as part of the expansion of the stadium. In Barry Switzer's 16 seasons as the Oklahoma Sooners head football coach, the team won three national championships, 12 Big Eight Conference championships and eight bowl games in 13 appearances.

==== Mural ====
Artist Ted Watts completed a mural in the Barry Switzer Center in December 1998, and updated the mural to include later accomplishments in 2002, 2005 and 2009. Subjects included:

Barry Switzer Center Mural Subject List
| Legendary coaches: John A. Harts; Bennie Owen; Lawrence "Biff" Jones; Jim Tatum; Bud Wilkinson; Barry Switzer; Bob Stoops; Heisman Trophy Winners: Billy Vessels, 1952; Steve Owens, 1969; Billy Sims, 1978; Jason White, 2003; Sam Bradford, 2008; Baker Mayfield, 2017; Kyler Murray, 2018; Other National Award Winners: J. D. Roberts; Jim Weatherall; Keith Jackson; Lee Roy Selmon; Tony Casillas; Greg Roberts; Rickey Dixon; Roy Williams; Brian Bosworth; Rocky Calmus; Anthony Phillips; Tommie Harris; Teddy Lehman; Derrick Strait; Jammal Brown; College Football Hall of Fame: Claude Reeds; Forest "Spot" Geyer; Jim Owens; Tommy McDonald; Roland "Waddy" Young; Jerry Tubbs; Greg Pruitt; Kurt Burris | Three-Time All-Americans: Paul "Buddy" Burris; Rod Shoate; Four-Time All-Conference: Wade Walker; Darrell Reed; Statistical Leaders: Joe Washington; Eddie Hinton; Darrell Royal; Daryl Hunt; Jackie Shipp; Special Sooners: Prentice Gautt; Cale Gundy; Bob Kalsu; Dewey Selmon; Lucious Selmon; Tinker Owens; NCAA Record 47-Game Win Streak: Jimmy Harris; Billy Pricer; Clendon Thomas; Tommy McDonald; Split-T Option: Tom Catlin; Eddie Crowder; Buck McPhail; Buddy Leake; Wishbone Triggermen: Jack Mildren; Steve Davis; Thomas Lott; J. C. Watts; Danny Bradley; Jamelle Holieway | Special: Uwe von Schamann's Kick; Oklahoma Memorial Stadium; National Championship Billboard; The Orange Bowl; Big 8 Conference; The Cotton Bowl; Red River Shootout Brass Hat Trophy; College Football Hall of Fame Logo; Pride of Oklahoma Marching Band; Spirit Squad; Fans; Jumbotron; AFCA National Championship Trophy; Heisman Trophy; Outland Trophy; Lombardi Award; Butkus Award; Jim Thorpe Award; Bronko Nagurski Trophy; NCAA Top Six Award; National Championship Rings; Bowl Championship Trophies; The Sooner Schooner; RUF/NEKS; "Mex" the dog; National Championships: 1950; 1955; 1956; 1974; 1975; 1985; 2000 |

== Recent innovations and future plans ==
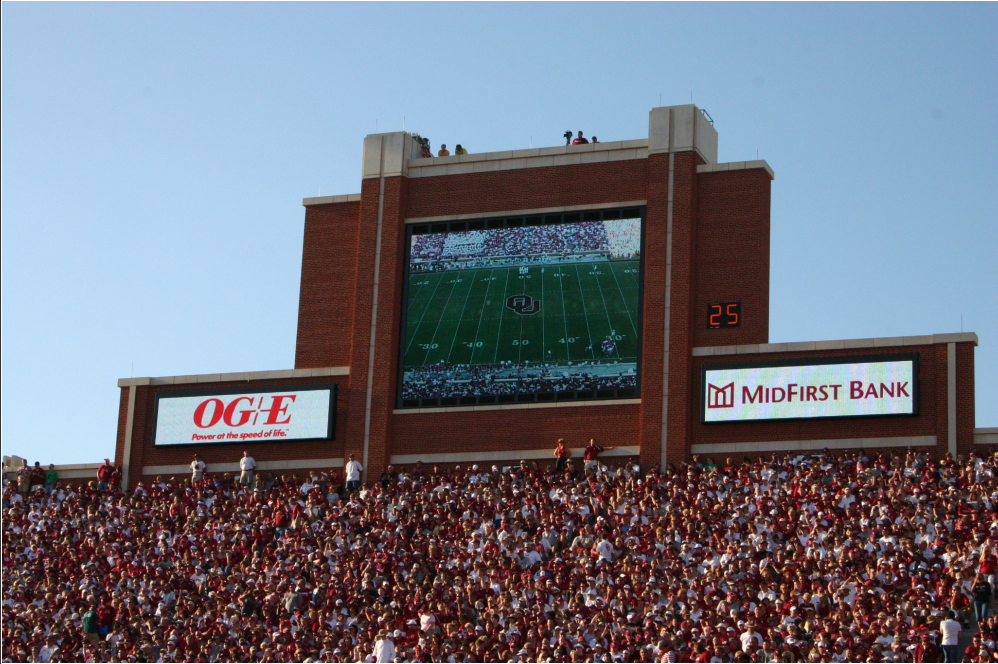
The north end zone scoreboard, installed prior to the 2007 season, replaced an older matrix-type messageboard

In a February 2007 radio interview, OU Athletic Director Joe Castiglione said that a new stadium master plan was in development. Castiglione spoke about replacing the press box and expanding the south end zone seating but gave no timetable or other details. In March 2007, the OU Board of Regents approved an Athletic Department request for $10.3 million to replace the displays and the sound systems of both the stadium and the Lloyd Noble Center.

The improvements include the installation of a state-of-the-art Daktronics 16mm HD-ready video replay board in the north end zone, which replaced an older matrix messageboard, and digital 23mm LED ribbon displays along the edges of both upper decks, the north end zone, and the north tunnel entrances. Eight new concession stands were added, along with more than 60 new toilets in the women's restrooms, 30 new water fountains, handrails on all aisles of the upper decks, new speakers in all restrooms, and a new public address system.

Phase two replaced the obsolete displays and sound system of the Lloyd Noble Center. The final phase was completed prior to the 2008 season and included replacement of the stadium's south scoreboard and sound system within the existing structure. The new displays are compatible with high-definition television equipment, although no HD cameras were purchased during the project.

On March 10, 2015, the University of Oklahoma board of regents approved the initial construction of "Phase 1" to renovate Gaylord Family Oklahoma Memorial Stadium. The renovation is expected to cost approximately $160 million and anticipated completion is just prior to the start of the 2016 football season. Due to uncertain economic conditions, the board of regents decided to start with "Phase 1" (which will focus primarily on the south endzone, football offices, training center and weight room), and proceed to "Phase 2" (which will focus on the west side of the stadium, including the press box, club seats and new facade. As well as various improvements to restrooms, escalators and concessions) at a later date, when the economic conditions have improved. The first phase of construction will bowl in the south endzone, and bring the total capacity to 83,489.

== Timeline of seating capacity ==
- 16,000 (1925–1928)
- 32,000 (1929–1948)
- 55,647 (1949–1956)
- 61,724 (1957–1962)
- 61,836 (1963–1974)
- 71,187 (1975–1979)
- 75,008 (1980–1983)
- 75,004 (1984–1997)
- 72,765 (1998–2002)
- 81,207 (2003)
- 82,112 (2004–2015)
- 86,112 (2016–2018)
- 80,126 (2019–present)

== Attendance records ==
The following are the largest crowds in the history of the stadium.

| Rank | Date | Attendance | Opponent | Oklahoma rank | Result |
|---|---|---|---|---|---|
| 1 | November 11, 2017 | 88,308 | #6 TCU | #5 | W, 38–20 |
| 2 | September 17, 2016 | 87,979 | #3 Ohio State | #14 | L, 45–24 |
| 3 | November 10, 2018 | 87,635 | Oklahoma State | #6 | W, 48–47 |
| 4 | December 3, 2016 | 87,527 | #10 Oklahoma State | #9 | W, 38–20 |
| 5 | September 22, 2018 | 87,177 | Army | #5 | W, 28–21 OT |
| 6 | September 10, 2016 | 87,037 | Louisiana-Monroe | #14 | W, 59–17 |
| 7 | September 29, 2018 | 86,642 | Baylor | #6 | W, 66–33 |
| 8 | September 8, 2018 | 86,483 | UCLA | #6 | W, 49–21 |
| 9 | October 27, 2018 | 86,436 | Kansas State | #8 | W, 51–14 |
| 10 | September 1, 2018 | 86,402 | Florida Atlantic | #7 | W, 63–14 |

== See also ==
- List of NCAA Division I FBS football stadiums
