= 1956 All-Big Seven Conference football team =

The 1956 All-Big Seven Conference football team consists of American football players chosen by various organizations for All-Big Seven Conference teams for the 1956 college football season. The selectors for the 1956 season included the Associated Press (AP) and the United Press (UP). Players selected as first-team players by both the AP and UP are designated in bold.

== All-Big Seven selections ==
=== Backs ===
- **Jimmy Hunter**, Missouri (AP-1 [QB]; UP-1 [QB])
- **Tommy McDonald**, Oklahoma (AP-1 [HB]; UP-1 [HB]) (College and Pro Football Halls of Fame)
- **Clendon Thomas**, Oklahoma (AP-1 [HB]; UP-1 [HB]) (College Football Hall of Fame)
- Jerry Brown, Nebraska (AP-1 [FB])
- John Bayuk, Colorado (UP-1 [FB])
- Jimmy Harris, Oklahoma (AP-2)
- Bob Stransky, Colorado (AP-2)
- Homer Floyd, Kansas (AP-2)
- Billy Pricer, Oklahoma (AP-2)

=== Ends ===
- **Jerry Leahy**, Colorado (AP-1; UP-1)
- **Wally Merz**, Colorado (AP-1; UP-1)
- Don Stiller, Oklahoma (AP-2)
- Jim Letcavits, Kansas (AP-2)

=== Tackles ===
- **Ed Gray**, Oklahoma (AP-1; UP-1)
- Tom Emerson, Oklahoma (AP-1)
- Dick Stapp, Colorado (AP-2; UP-1)
- Andris Poncius, Iowa St. (AP-2)

=== Guards ===
- **Bill Krisher**, Oklahoma (AP-1; UP-1)
- Laverne Torczon, Nebraska (AP-1)
- Ellis Rainsberger, Kansas State (AP-2; UP-1)
- Joe Oujesky, Oklahoma (AP-2)

=== Centers ===
- **Jerry Tubbs**, Oklahoma (AP-1; UP-1) (College Football Hall of Fame)
- Jim Uhir, Colorado (AP-2)

== Key ==
AP = Associated Press

UP = United Press

== See also ==
- 1956 College Football All-America Team
