= Don Glantz =

Canadian gridiron football player (born 1933)

Profile
- Positions: Guard, Tackle

Personal information
- Born: July 8, 1933 (age 93); Central City, Nebraska, U.S.
- Listed height: 6 ft 0 in (1.83 m)
- Listed weight: 220 lb (100 kg)

Career information
- NFL draft: 1955: 5th round, 52nd overall pick

Career history
- 1955: Edmonton Eskimos

Awards and highlights
- Grey Cup champion (1955); Second-team All-Big Seven (1954)

Don Glantz (born July 8, 1933) was an American professional football player who played for the Edmonton Eskimos. He won the Grey Cup with the Eskimos in 1955. Glantz was a native of Nebraska and attended the University of Nebraska. He was selected in the fifth round of the 1955 NFL draft pick by the Washington Redskins.
