= 1955 All-Big Seven Conference football team =

College football honor

The 1955 All-Big Seven Conference football team consists of American football players chosen by various organizations for All-Big Seven Conference teams for the 1955 college football season. The selectors for the 1955 season included the Associated Press (AP) and the United Press (UP). Players selected as first-team players by both the AP and UP are designated in bold.

== All-Big Seven selections ==
=== Backs ===
- **Tommy McDonald**, Oklahoma (AP-1 [HB]; UP-1 [HB]) (College and Pro Football Halls of Fame)
- **Doug Roether**, Kansas St. (AP-1; UP-1 [FB])
- Bob Burris, Oklahoma (AP-1; UP-2 [HB])
- Rex Fisher, Nebraska (AP-1; UP-2)
- Jimmy Harris, Oklahoma (AP-2; UP-1 [QB])
- Willie Greenlaw, Nebraska (AP-2; UP-1 [HB])
- Clendon Thomas, Oklahoma (AP-2)
- Billy Pricer, Oklahoma (AP-2)
- Bob Whitehead, Kansas State (UP-2)
- Gene Roll, Missouri (UP-2)

=== Ends ===
- **Hank Burnine**, Missouri (AP-1; UP-1)
- Lamar Myer, Colorado (AP-1; UP-2)
- Jon McWilliams, Nebraska (AP-2; UP-1)
- John Bell, Oklahoma (AP-2)
- Joe Mobra, Oklahoma (UP-2)

=== Tackles ===
- **Ed Gray**, Oklahoma (AP-1; UP-1)
- Laverne Torczon, Nebraska (AP-1)
- Sam Salerno, Colorado (AP-2; UP-1)
- Ron Nery, Kansas St. (AP-2; UP-2)
- Calvin Woodworth, Oklahoma (AP-2)
- Al Portney, Missouri (UP-2)

=== Guards ===
- **Bo Bolinger**, Oklahoma (AP-1; UP-1)
- **Cecil Morris**, Oklahoma (AP-1; UP-1)
- Jim McCauley, Iowa St. (AP-2)
- Jim Martin, Missouri (UP-2)
- Dick Stapp, Colorado (UP-2)

=== Centers ===
- **Jerry Tubbs**, Oklahoma (AP-1; UP-1)
- Jim Furey, Kansas St. (AP-2; UP-2)

== Key ==
AP = Associated Press

UP = United Press

== See also ==
- 1955 College Football All-America Team
