= Bo Bolinger =

American football player, coach, and scout (1932–2011)

No. 79
- Position: Guard

Personal information
- Born: December 26, 1932; Oklahoma, U.S.
- Died: August 5, 2011 (aged 78); Tempe, Arizona, U.S.
- Listed height: 5 ft 11 in (1.80 m)
- Listed weight: 205 lb (93 kg)

Career information
- High school: Central (Muskogee, Oklahoma)
- College: Oklahoma
- NFL draft: 1956: 13th round, 149th overall pick

Career history
- 1956: Edmonton Eskimos

Awards and highlights
- National champion (1955); Consensus All-American (1955); 2× First-team All-Big Seven (1954, 1955)

Virgilee Clinton "Bo" Bolinger (December 26, 1932 – August 5, 2011) was an American football guard who played one season with the Edmonton Eskimos of the Canadian Football League (CFL). He was drafted by the Chicago Cardinals of the National Football League (NFL) in the thirteenth round of the 1956 NFL draft. Bolinger played college football at the University of Oklahoma and attended Central High School in Muskogee, Oklahoma. He was a consensus All-American in 1955.

Bolinger also served as a football coach and scout for various organizations.

== Early life ==
Bolinger played football at Central High School in Muskogee, Oklahoma. He was a member of the "B Boys" that included Kurt and Robert Burris and Max Boydston. They had all played high school football together and went on to play for the Oklahoma Sooners.

== College career ==
Bolinger was a Consensus All-American and ninth in Heisman Trophy voting in 1955. He was member of the 1955 Oklahoma Sooners national championship team.

== Professional career ==
Bolinger was drafted in the 13th round by the Chicago Cardinals of the NFL with the 149th pick in the 1956 NFL draft. He spent the 1956 season with the Edmonton Eskimos of the CFL.

== Coaching career ==
Bolinger was head coach of the Miami High School football team in Miami, Oklahoma in 1957. He was coach of the offensive and defensive lines at the University of Denver from 1958 to 1960. He was defensive coordinator at the University of Tulsa from 1961 to 1962. He was offensive and defensive coordinator for the University of New Mexico from 1963 to 1967. Bolinger was the offensive coordinator at Utah State University in 1968. He then spent two seasons as offensive line coach of the Calgary Stampeders.

== Scouting career ==
Bolinger joined the Arizona Cardinals in 1971. He was Director of College Scouting from 1994 to 1997 and Senior Scout from 1998 to 2000. He then served as a scout for the Tennessee Titans for eight seasons.
