= LaVerne Torczon =

American football player (1936–2015)

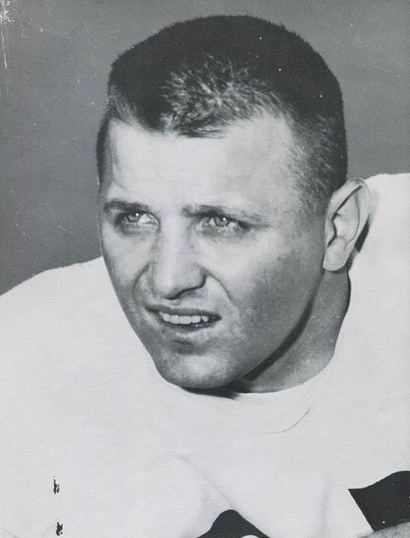

No. 87, 78, 88
- Position: Defensive end

Personal information
- Born: January 1, 1936; Columbus, Nebraska, U.S.
- Died: April 18, 2015 (aged 79); Lincoln, Nebraska, U.S.
- Listed height: 6 ft 3 in (1.91 m)
- Listed weight: 250 lb (113 kg)

Career information
- High school: Columbus
- College: Nebraska
- NFL draft: 1957: 18th round, 211th overall pick

Career history
- Cleveland Browns (1957)*; Montreal Alouettes (1957)*; Buffalo Bills (1960–1962); New York Titans/Jets (1962–1965); Miami Dolphins (1966)
- * Offseason or practice squad member only

Awards and highlights
- TSN All-AFL (1960); AFL All-Star (1961); 2× First-team All-Big Seven (1955, 1956)

Career AFL statistics
- Interceptions: 2
- Touchdowns: 1
- Sacks: 27.5
- Stats at Pro Football Reference

Laverne Joseph "Tarzan" Torczon (Pronounced: "TORE-sun") (January 1, 1936 – April 18, 2015) was an American football defensive end. He was selected by the Cleveland Browns in the 18th round (211th overall) of the 1957 NFL Draft. He played college football at the University of Nebraska, and played professionally in the American Football League (AFL) for the Buffalo Bills, the New York Titans/Jets, and the Miami Dolphins. He was the Sporting News selection as an AFL All-League defensive end in 1960 and played in the 1961 AFL All-Star game.

== See also ==
- List of American Football League players
