= Jim Furey =

American gridiron football player (1932–2024)

No. 45, 41, 50
- Position: Linebacker

Personal information
- Born: September 22, 1932; Newark, New Jersey, U.S.
- Died: January 28, 2024 (aged 91); Livingston, New Jersey, U.S.
- Listed height: 6 ft 0 in (1.83 m)
- Listed weight: 228 lb (103 kg)

Career information
- High school: Barringer (Newark)
- College: Kansas St
- NFL draft: 1956: 13th round, 157th overall pick

Career history

Playing
- Cleveland Browns (1956)*; Calgary Stampeders (1958); BC Lions (1959–1960); New York Titans (1961)
- * Offseason or practice squad member only

Coaching
- Jersey Giants / Jersey City Giants / Jersey Jets (1963-1966) Assistant; Waterbury Orbits (1967) Assistant; Bridgeport Jets (1968) Defense; Jersey Jays (1970) Assistant

Awards and highlights
- 2× Second-team All-Big Seven (1954, 1955)
- Stats at Pro Football Reference

James Andrew Furey (September 22, 1932 – January 28, 2024) was an American gridiron football player who played for the Calgary Stampeders, BC Lions and New York Titans. He played college football at Kansas State University. Furey died in Livingston, New Jersey on January 28, 2024, at the age of 91.
