= Jerry Tubbs =

American football player (1935–2012)

No. 53, 62, 50
- Positions: Linebacker, center

Personal information
- Born: January 23, 1935; Throckmorton County, Texas, U.S.
- Died: June 13, 2012 (aged 77); Dallas, Texas, U.S.
- Listed height: 6 ft 2 in (1.88 m)
- Listed weight: 221 lb (100 kg)

Career information
- High school: Breckenridge (TX)
- College: Oklahoma
- NFL draft: 1957: 1st round, 10th overall pick

Career history

Playing
- Chicago Cardinals (1957–1958); San Francisco 49ers (1958-1959); Dallas Cowboys (1960–1967)

Coaching
- Dallas Cowboys (1966–1988) Linebackers

Awards and highlights
- Pro Bowl (1962); 2× National champion (1955, 1956); Knute Rockne Memorial Trophy (1956); UPI Lineman of the Year (1956); Unanimous All-American (1956); Second-team All-American (1955); 2× First-team All-Big Seven (1955, 1956); Oklahoma Football All-Century team; As a coach: 2× Super Bowl champion as a coach (VI, XII)

Career NFL statistics
- Games played: 119
- Games started: 100
- Fumble recoveries: 11
- Stats at Pro Football Reference
- College Football Hall of Fame

Gerald J. Tubbs (January 23, 1935 – June 13, 2012) was an American professional football linebacker in the National Football League (NFL) for the San Francisco 49ers and Dallas Cowboys. He was selected by Chicago Cardinals in the first round (10th overall) of the 1957 NFL draft. After his retirement, he stayed with the Cowboys as an assistant coach for 22 years. He played college football at the University of Oklahoma.

== Early life ==
Tubbs was an honor graduate student and played center at Breckenridge High School. He was part of two Texas state championship football teams in 1951 and 1952. He played in three high school All-Star games and was a unanimous Texas All-State selection in 1952.

The teams were coached by Cooper Robbins (1951) and Joe Kerbel (1952), who would go on to the college ranks. Tubbs lost only three games during his high school career.

In 1971, he was inducted into the Texas High School Football Hall of Fame. Since 2008, the Breckenridge Buckaroos open the football season playing the "Jerry Tubbs Kickoff Classic".

== College career ==
Tubbs accepted a football scholarship from the University of Oklahoma. He played three varsity years, contributing to the Sooners winning all 31 games during that period.

As a sophomore in 1954, when fullback Billy Pricer was injured, Tubbs had to replace him playing against University of Texas, the first time he had ever played in the backfield. He rushed for 387 yards, 2 touchdowns and averaged 6.1 yards per carry.

As a junior in 1955, head coach Bud Wilkinson moved him to center, which became his signature position, while also playing linebacker. In the 20–0 victory over the University of Texas, he had 27 tackles and 3 interceptions, prompting Wilkinson to call it "the single greatest game ever played by an Oklahoma defender".

As a senior in 1956, he finished fourth in the Heisman Trophy voting (very high for a lineman), behind his third place teammate, Tommy McDonald, and winner Paul Hornung of Notre Dame University. he was a unanimous All-American center, was named Lineman of the Year by three agencies and was also an Academic All-America. He graduated from Oklahoma with a degree in economics.

During his three varsity years, Oklahoma's record was 10-0, 11-0, 10-0. His 31 wins were part of that legendary 47-game winning streak and two national titles from 1954-56. The 1954 team was ranked third nationally in the Associated Press and United Press polls. The 1955 and 1956 teams were national champions. In those years Oklahoma played in only one bowl game, where the 1955 team beat Maryland University 20-6 in the Orange Bowl.

In 1996, he was inducted into the College Football Hall of Fame. In 1999, he was inducted into the Oklahoma Sports Hall of Fame.

== Professional career ==
=== Chicago Cardinals ===
Tubbs was selected by the Chicago Cardinals in the first round (10th overall) of the 1957 NFL draft. Suddenly, he found himself on a perennial loser, playing out of position as an outside linebacker. He was eventually benched, and then traded to the San Francisco 49ers after the seventh game of the 1958 season.

=== San Francisco 49ers ===
In 1959, the San Francisco 49ers moved him into the middle linebacker position, where he became a starter. After the 1959 season, Tubbs planned to retire, so the 49ers left him off their list of players who were exempt from the 1960 NFL expansion draft.

=== Dallas Cowboys ===
Tubbs was acquired by the Dallas Cowboys in 1960 NFL expansion draft. As it turned out, he would spend the next 29 years in Dallas — as a player, player-coach and full-time assistant coach. In the 4th game of the 1960 season, Tubbs became the first player in franchise history to start at the middle linebacker position on a regular basis, finishing with 149 tackles (48 solo).

Tubbs was an impact player on those early Cowboys teams and also rated among the top middle linebackers in the NFL. He had quickness, toughness and an unbeatable motor. In 1962, he was one of the first Cowboys players voted to the Pro Bowl, along with: QB Eddie LeBaron; DT Bob Lilly; RB Don Perkins; and CB Don Bishop.

He became a player-coach in 1965. In 1966 he retired and was working for the Dallas Federal Savings and Loan Association, but was lured back by Tom Landry to play behind Lee Roy Jordan for one more year. He played just the first three games of the season, until he suffered a back injury.

The following year (1967), Landry sensing that the Cowboys had a real chance at a championship, wanted to have Tubbs as insurance in the event Lee Roy Jordan should be injured. He came back again, but didn't play a single down while serving as a player-coach, hence he was on the roster and in uniform for the 1967 Ice Bowl championship game against the Packers.

== Personal life ==
When he finally retired as a player at the end of the 1967 season, he became Cowboys linebackers coach for 21 years. He coached in five Super Bowls, winning two of them. He died on June 13, 2012, at the age of 77.
