= 1955 Oklahoma Sooners football team =

American college football season

1955 Oklahoma Sooners football

Consensus national champion Big 7 champion Orange Bowl champion

Orange Bowl, W 20–6 vs. Maryland
- Conference: Big Seven Conference

Ranking
- Coaches: No. 1
- AP: No. 1
- Record: 11–0 (6–0 Big 7)
- Head coach: Bud Wilkinson (9th season)
- Captains: Bo Bolinger; Robert Loughridge; Cecil Morris
- Home stadium: Oklahoma Memorial Stadium

1955 Big Seven Conference football standings
	Conf.					Overall
Team	W		L		T	W		L		T
No. 1 Oklahoma $	6	–	0	–	0	11	–	0	–	0
Nebraska	5	–	1	–	0	5	–	5	–	0
Colorado	3	–	3	–	0	6	–	4	–	0
Kansas State	3	–	3	–	0	4	–	6	–	0
Kansas	1	–	4	–	1	3	–	6	–	1
Iowa State	1	–	4	–	1	1	–	7	–	1
Missouri	1	–	5	–	0	1	–	9	–	0
$ – Conference champion; Rankings from AP Poll

The 1955 Oklahoma Sooners football team was an American football team that represented the University of Oklahoma in the Big Seven Conference (Big 7) during the 1955 college football season. Led by ninth-year head coach Bud Wilkinson, the Sooners compiled an 11–0 record, outscored opponents by a total of 385 to 60, won the Big 7 and national championships, and defeated No. 3 Maryland, 20–6, in the 1956 Orange Bowl. In the Orange Bowl, Oklahoma trailed by six at halftime, and then outscored Maryland, 20–0, in the second half. Oklahoma's 1955 season was the school's tenth consecutive conference championship and part of a record-setting 47-game winning streak that lasted from October 10, 1953, through November 9, 1957.

The Sooners played their home games at Owen Field in Norman, Oklahoma.

== Schedule ==
Date	Opponent	Rank	Site	TV	Result	Attendance	Source
September 24	at North Carolina*	No. 3	Kenan Memorial Stadium; Chapel Hill, NC		W 13–6	26,638	
October 1	No. 12 Pittsburgh*	No. 5	Owen Field; Norman, OK		W 26–14	55,412–58,000	
October 8	vs. Texas*	No. 3	Cotton Bowl; Dallas, TX (Red River Shootout)		W 20–0	75,504	
October 15	Kansas	No. 3	Owen Field; Norman, OK		W 44–6	39,789	
October 22	No. 14 Colorado	No. 3	Owen Field; Norman, OK	NBC	W 56–21	57,663	
October 29	at Kansas State	No. 2	Memorial Stadium; Manhattan, KS		W 40–7	18,263	
November 5	at Missouri	No. 1	Memorial Stadium; Columbia, MO (rivalry)		W 20–0	32,289	
November 12	Iowa State	No. 1	Owen Field; Norman, OK		W 52–0	46,455	
November 19	at Nebraska	No. 1	Memorial Stadium; Lincoln, NE (rivalry)		W 41–0	36,576	
November 26	Oklahoma A&M*	No. 1	Owen Field; Norman, OK (Bedlam)		W 53–0	40,182	
January 2, 1956	vs. No. 3 Maryland*	No. 1	Burdine Stadium; Miami, FL (Orange Bowl)	CBS	W 20–6	76,561	
*Non-conference game; Rankings from AP Poll released prior to the game

== Rankings ==
Ranking movements Legend: ██ Increase in ranking ██ Decrease in ranking ( ) = First-place votes
	Week											
Poll	Pre	1	2	3	4	5	6	7	8	9	10	Final
AP	2 (32)	3 (10)	5 (12)	3 (13)	3 (21)	3 (29)	2 (53)	2 (54)	1 (115)	1 (103)	1 (114)	1 (218)

== National championship ==
In the final AP Poll released on November 28, 1955, Oklahoma was ranked No. 1 with 3,581 points, more than 300 points ahead of No. 2 Michigan State. The Sooners also finished with the No. 1 ranking in the final UPI coaches poll. The team was also recognized as the 1955 national champion in rankings and analyses issued by Berryman (QPRS), Billingsley Report, College Football Researchers Association, DeVold System, Dunkel System, Football Writers Association of America (FWAA), Helms Athletic Foundation, International News Service, Litkenhous, National Championship Foundation, Poling System, Sagarin Ratings, and Williamson System.

== Honors and statistical leaders ==
Guard Bo Bolinger was a consensus first-team pick on the 1955 All-America college football team.

Halfback Tommy McDonald led the team with 102 points scored, 715 rushing yards, and 284 passing yards. McDonald received first-team All-America honors from the Associated Press.

Three of the coaches and two of the players on the 1955 Sooners were later inducted into the College Football Hall of Fame: coach Wilkinson (inducted 1969); assistant coach Gomer Jones (inducted 1978); Tommy McDonald (inducted 1985); assistant coach Pete Elliott (inducted 1994); and center Jerry Tubbs (inducted 1996).

== Personnel ==
=== Players ===
- Hugh Ballard, end
- John Bell, end
- Bo Bolinger, guard
- Henry Bonney, guard
- Chuck Bowman, center
- Bill Brown, fullback
- J. Broyles, center
- Bob Burris, back
- Roland Butler, guard
- Steve Champlin, tackle
- Gene Cockrell, tackle
- Bobby Darnell, center
- Billy Davis, guard
- Ernie Day
- Dale DePue, quarterback
- Robert Derrick, halfback
- Wilbur Derrick, end
- Carl Dodd, quarterback
- John Ederer
- Tom Emerson, tackle
- Jerry Fronterhouse, center
- Duane Goff, end
- Ed Gray, end
- Wayne Greenlee, fullback
- Kenneth Hallum, tackle
- Bill Harris, end
- Jimmy Harris, quarterback
- Jim Heard, fullback
- Fred Hood, end
- Doyle Jennings, tackle
- Mickey Johnson
- Charles Joseph, halfback
- Bill Krisher, guard
- Benton Ladd, tackle
- Delbert Long, halfback
- David Loop, end
- Robert Loughridge, tackle
- Bob Martin, end
- Tommy McDonald, halfback
- Gerald McPhail, halfback
- Frank Merkt, halfback
- Joe Mobra, end
- Cecil Morris, guard
- Dennit Morris, linebacker
- Don Nelson, fullback
- Ken Northcutt, guard
- Jay O'Neal, quarterback
- Joseph Oujesky, guard
- Edward Parry, tackle
- Tommy Pearson, end
- Billy Pricer, back
- Billy Rhodes, halfback
- Byron Searcy, tackle
- Dale Sherrod, halfback
- Dan Smith, halfback
- Don Stiller, end/guard
- Bill Sturm, quarterback
- Rodger Taylor, halfback
- Clendon Thomas, halfback
- Bob Timberlake, end
- Jerry Tubbs, center
- Barry West, guard
- Woody Wolverton, center
- Calvin Woodworth, tackle

=== Coaches ===
- Head coach: Bud Wilkinson
- Assistant coaches: Pete Elliott, Gomer Jones, Sam Lyle

== NFL draft ==
The following Sooners were selected in the 1955 NFL draft following the season.

Round	Pick	Player	Position	NFL team
4	44	Cecil Morris	Guard	Green Bay Packers
6	68	Bob Burris	Back	Green Bay Packers
13	149	Bo Bolinger	Guard	Chicago Cardinals
20	241	Joe Mobra	End	Cleveland Browns
