= 1954 All-Big Seven Conference football team =

The 1954 All-Big Seven Conference football team consists of American football players chosen by various organizations for All-Big Seven Conference teams for the 1954 college football season. The selectors for the 1954 season included the Associated Press (AP) and the United Press (UP). Players selected as first-team honorees by both the AP and UP are displayed in bold.

== All-Big Seven selections ==
=== Backs ===
- **Carroll Hardy**, Colorado (AP-1; UP-1)
- **Frank Bernardi**, Colorado (AP-1; UP-1)
- Buddy Leake, Oklahoma (AP-1; UP-2)
- Bob Smith, Nebraska (AP-1)
- Gene Calame, Oklahoma (AP-2; UP-1)
- Corky Taylor, Kansas State (AP-2; UP-1)
- Vic Eaton, Missouri (AP-2; UP-2)
- Max Burkett, Iowa St. (AP-2; UP-2)
- Bob Bauman, Missouri (UP-2)

=== Ends ===
- **Max Boydston**, Oklahoma (AP-1; UP-1)
- **Carl Allison**, Oklahoma (AP-1; UP-1)
- Andy Loehr, Nebraska (AP-2; UP-2)
- Lamar Meyer, Colorado (AP-2)
- Barney Alleman, Iowa State (UP-2)

=== Tackles ===
- **Al Portney**, Missouri (AP-1; UP-1)
- Ron Nery, Kansas State (AP-1; UP-2)
- Ray Marciniak, Kansas State (UP-1)
- Ed Gray, Oklahoma (AP-2; UP-2)
- Don Glantz, Nebraska (AP-2; UP-2)

=== Guards ===
- **Bo Bolinger**, Oklahoma (AP-1; UP-1)
- **Charles Bryant**, Nebraska (AP-1; UP-1)
- Dick Stapp, Colorado (AP-2)
- Cecil Morris, Oklahoma (AP-2)
- Sam Salerno, Colorado (UP-2)

=== Centers ===
- **Kurt Burris**, Oklahoma (AP-1; UP-1)
- Tony Karakas, Missouri (AP-2)
- Jim Furey, Kansas State (UP-2)

== Key ==
AP = Associated Press UP = United Press

== See also ==
- 1954 College Football All-America Team
