= Max Boydston =

American gridiron football player (1932–1998)

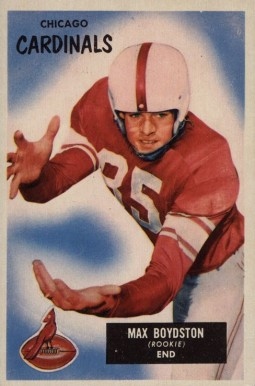
- Boydston on a 1955 Bowman football card

No. 83, 76, 80, 81, 84
- Position: End

Personal information
- Born: January 22, 1932; Ardmore, Oklahoma, U.S.
- Died: December 12, 1998 (aged 66); Muskogee, Oklahoma, U.S.
- Listed height: 6 ft 2 in (1.88 m)
- Listed weight: 210 lb (95 kg)

Career information
- High school: Muskogee
- College: Oklahoma (1951–1954)
- NFL draft: 1955: 1st round, 2nd overall pick

Career history
- Chicago Cardinals (1955–1958); Hamilton Tiger-Cats (1959); Dallas Texans (1960–1961); Oakland Raiders (1962)

Awards and highlights
- Consensus All-American (1954); 3× First-team All-Big Seven (1952, 1953, 1954)

Career NFL/AFL statistics
- Receptions: 97
- Receiving yards: 1,328
- Receiving touchdowns: 8
- Stats at Pro Football Reference

Max Ray Boydston (January 22, 1932 – December 12, 1998) was an American professional football player who was an end in the National Football League (NFL), and American Football League (AFL). He played college football for the Oklahoma Sooners, earning consensus All-American honors in 1954.

== College career ==
Born in Ardmore, Oklahoma, Boydston played college football for Bud Wilkinson's Oklahoma Sooners. In 1954 he was named a consensus All-American, chosen first-team by six of the eight selector organizations, and second-team by the other two. He was one of several Sooners from Muskogee, Oklahoma - along with the Burris brothers (Buddy, Kurt and Bob) and Bo Bolinger - to earn All-Conference or All-American honors in the 1950s.

== Professional career ==
Boydston was a first-round selection (second overall) in the 1955 NFL draft by the Chicago Cardinals. He played for the Cardinals from 1955 to 1958. In 1959, he played in the CFL for the Hamilton Tiger-Cats. In the AFL he played for the Dallas Texans (1960–1961) and the Oakland Raiders (1962).

== Coaching career ==
Boydston coached at Carroll Senior High School in Southlake, Texas in 1964 and 1965, and again from 1970 through 1973. From 1967 to 1969, Boydston was head football coach at Stratford High School located in the Texas Panhandle.
