= Joe Mobra =

American gridiron football player (1933–1981)

Profile
- Position: End

Personal information
- Born: January 6, 1933; Wyandotte, Oklahoma, U.S.
- Died: March 8, 1981 (aged 48); Tulsa, Oklahoma, U.S.
- Listed height: 6 ft 2 in (1.88 m)
- Listed weight: 210 lb (95 kg)

Career information
- College: Oklahoma
- NFL draft: 1956: 20th round, 241st overall pick

Career history
- 1956–1958: Edmonton Eskimos

Awards and highlights
- Grey Cup champion (1956); National champion (1955); Second-team All-Big Seven (1955)

Joe Vernon Mobra (January 6, 1933 – March 8, 1981) was an American professional football player who played for the Edmonton Eskimos. He won the Grey Cup with the Eskimos in 1956. Mobra played football, basketball, and baseball at the University of Oklahoma.
