= Cecil Morris =

American football player and coach (1933–2001)

Biographical details
- Born: November 8, 1933; Lawton, Oklahoma, U.S.
- Died: September 12, 2001 (aged 67)

Playing career
- 1953–1955: Oklahoma

Coaching career (HC unless noted)
- 1981–1983: Cameron

Head coaching record
- Overall: 13–15

Accomplishments and honors

Championships
- National (1955)

Awards
- First-team All-Big Seven (1955); Second-team All-Big Seven (1954)

Cecil Ray Morris (November 8, 1933 – September 12, 2001) was an American football coach and player. He served as the head football coach at Cameron University in Lawton, Oklahoma from 1981 to 1983. Morris played at the University of Oklahoma under head coach Bud Wilkinson.
