= Tom Emerson (Canadian football) =

Canadian football player

Profile
- Position: Tackle

Personal information
- Born: c. 1935 (age 90–91)
- Listed height: 6 ft 4 in (1.93 m)
- Listed weight: 220 lb (100 kg)

Career information
- College: Oklahoma
- NFL draft: 1957: 28th round, 336th overall pick

Career history
- 1958–1960: Edmonton Eskimos

Awards and highlights
- 2× National champion (1955, 1956); First-team All-Big Seven (1956)

Tom Emerson (born c. 1935) is an American former professional football player who played for the Edmonton Eskimos. He played college football at the University of Oklahoma. Emerson was selected in the 28th round of the 1957 NFL draft by the Chicago Bears, but did not play in the league.
