= Ed Gray (Canadian football) =

American gridiron football player (1934–1976)

Profile
- Position: Defensive end

Personal information
- Born: December 9, 1934; Odessa, Texas, U.S.
- Died: April 28, 1976 (aged 41)
- Listed height: 6 ft 2 in (1.88 m)
- Listed weight: 220 lb (100 kg)

Career information
- College: Oklahoma
- NFL draft: 1957: 7th round, 75th overall pick

Career history
- 1957–1962: Edmonton Eskimos

Awards and highlights
- 2× CFL West All-Star (1959, 1960); 2× National champion (1955, 1956); First-team All-American (1956); 2× First-team All-Big Seven (1955, 1956); Second-team All-Big Seven (1954)

Ed Gray (December 9, 1934 – April 28, 1976) was an All-American and team captain of the 1956 University of Oklahoma football team who played for the Edmonton Eskimos as a defensive end in the Canadian Football League (CFL) from 1957 to 1962 and was an all-star player for two of those years.

== Oklahoma Sooners ==
In 1955 and 1956, Ed Gray played for Sooner teams that won national championships. In 1956, he was team captain and All-American for a team that went 10-1 and allowed only 89 points on defense.

== Edmonton Eskimos ==
As a member of the Edmonton Eskimos, Ed Gray played defensive end from 1957 to 1962. He played in only eight games in his first year, but earned a regular spot the following year and from 1958 to 1961 played in all 16 games. Gray was named as a Western conference All-Star in 1959 and 1960. He ended his career in 1962 after playing in 13 games. In his career, he recovered six fumbles, two of them for touchdowns, and intercepted one pass.
