= Bill Krisher =

American football player (1935–2025)

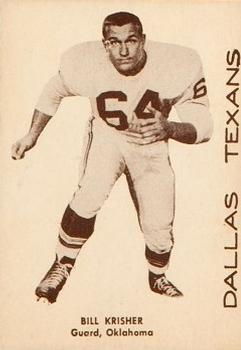
- Krisher on a 1960 trading card

No. 64
- Position: Guard

Personal information
- Born: September 18, 1935; Perry, Oklahoma, U.S.
- Died: July 29, 2025 (aged 89); Dallas, Texas, U.S.
- Listed height: 6 ft 1 in (1.85 m)
- Listed weight: 233 lb (106 kg)

Career information
- High school: Midwest City (Midwest City, Oklahoma)
- College: Oklahoma
- NFL draft: 1958: 3rd round, 32nd overall pick

Career history
- Pittsburgh Steelers (1958); Dallas Texans (1960-1961)

Awards and highlights
- All-AFL (1960); 2× AFL All-Star (1960, 1961); 2× National champion (1955, 1956); Consensus All-American (1957); Third-team All-American (1956); 2× First-team All-Big Eight (1956, 1957)

Career NFL/AFL statistics
- Games played: 35
- Games started: 26
- Fumble recoveries: 1
- Stats at Pro Football Reference

William Irwin Krisher (September 18, 1935 – July 29, 2025) was an American professional football player who was a guard in the National Football League (NFL) and American Football League (AFL). He played college football for the Oklahoma Sooners, earning All-American honors in 1956 and 1957. Krisher played two seasons in the AFL from 1960 to 1961 for the Dallas Texans. He was named All-AFL in 1960 and an AFL Western Division All-Star in 1961.

From his college days, Krisher was an active member of the Fellowship of Christian Athletes, and by 1975 was the director of the south-western region of the FCA.

Krisher died in Dallas, Texas on July 29, 2025, at the age of 89.

== See also ==
- List of American Football League players
