= Dennit Morris =

American football player (1936–2014)

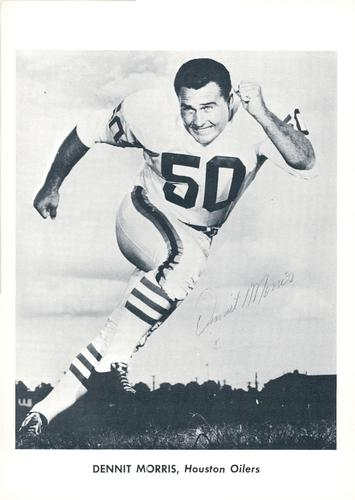

No. 57, 50
- Position: Linebacker

Personal information
- Born: April 15, 1936; Hanna, Oklahoma, U.S.
- Died: April 28, 2014 (aged 78); Tulsa, Oklahoma, U.S.
- Listed height: 6 ft 1 in (1.85 m)
- Listed weight: 228 lb (103 kg)

Career information
- High school: Webster (Tulsa)
- College: Oklahoma (1954–1957)
- NFL draft: 1958: 18th round, 215th overall pick

Career history
- San Francisco 49ers (1958); Houston Oilers (1960-1961)

Awards and highlights
- 2× AFL champion (1960, 1961); AFL All-Star (1961); 2× National champion (1955, 1956)

Career NFL/AFL statistics
- Interceptions: 5
- Sacks: 4
- Stats at Pro Football Reference

Dennit Morris (April 15, 1936 – April 28, 2014) was an American football linebacker who played three seasons in the National Football League (NFL) and American Football League (AFL). He played on two college national championship and two AFL championship teams. Morris played football and baseball at the University of Oklahoma.

== See also ==
- Other American Football League players
