= University of Oklahoma College of Architecture =

Architecture school at the University of Oklahoma

Coordinates: 35°12′20″N 97°26′42″W

Christopher C. Gibbs College of Architecture
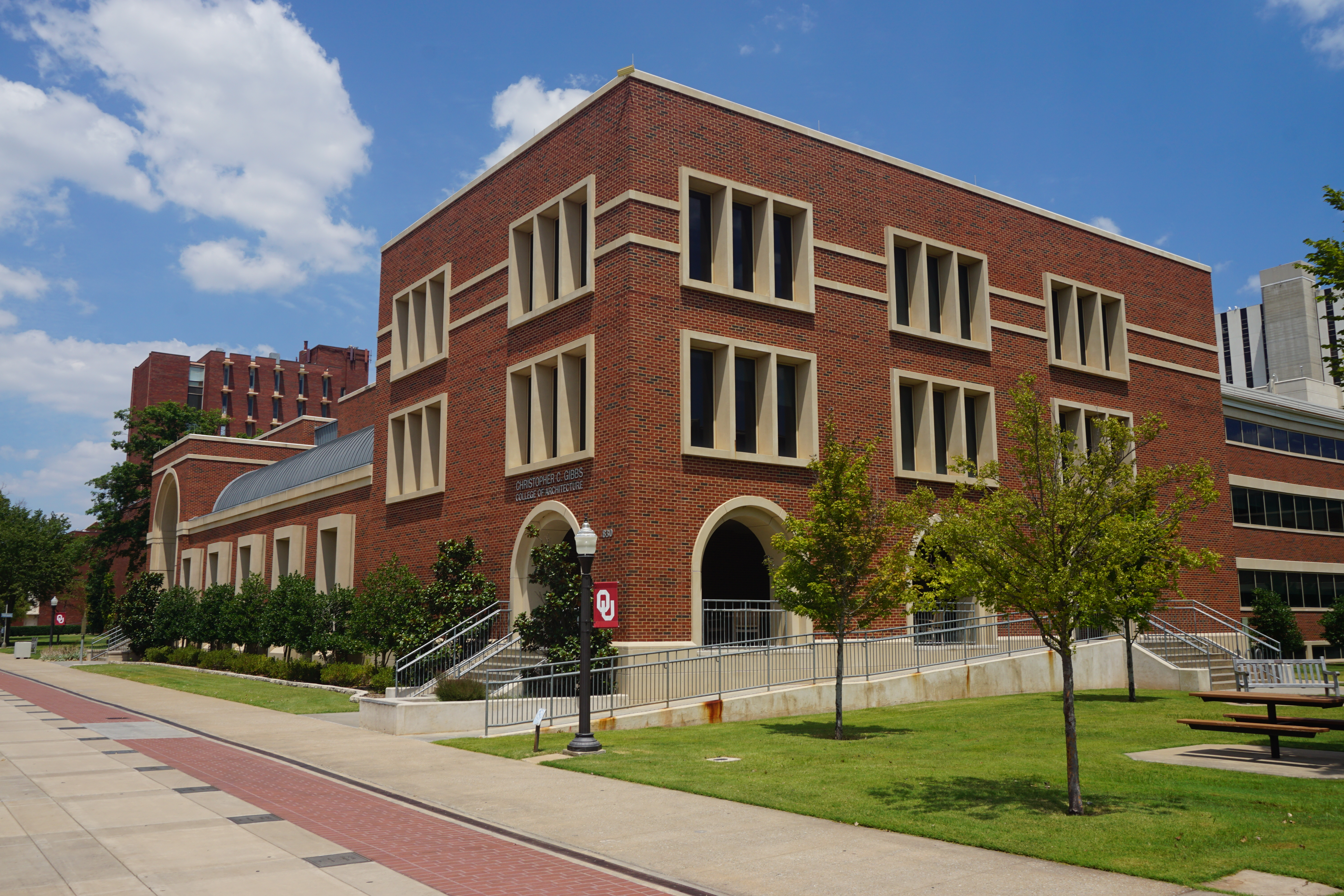
- Gould Hall, home of the College of Architecture
- Former names: College of Engineering - School of Architecture (1926–70); College of Environmental Design (1970–84)
- Type: Public
- Established: 1926
- Affiliations: University of Oklahoma
- Dean: Hans Butzer
- Academic staff: 106
- Students: 872
- Undergraduates: 675
- Postgraduates: 197
- Location: Norman, Oklahoma, USA
- Website: architecture.ou.edu

The Christopher C. Gibbs College of Architecture at the University of Oklahoma is the architecture unit of the University of Oklahoma in Norman. It offers over 30 undergraduate and graduate degrees in four divisions. In Spring 2023, it had an enrollment of 675 undergraduates and 197 graduates.

== History ==
The college as it stands now was formed in 1970 as the College of Environmental Design. It was renamed the College of Architecture in 1984. Architecture was formally established at OU in 1926 as the School of Architecture under the College of Engineering. The Construction Science program began in 1978, and in 1982 the Interior Design and Landscape Architecture programs were incorporated into the college. In 1987, the Department of Regional and City Planning moved to the College of Architecture from the College of Arts and Sciences.

In 1943, renowned architect Bruce Goff was appointed chairman of the School of Architecture and served in that role until 1955.

In Norman, classes are held primarily in Gould Hall, built in 1950. In 2008, Gould Hall underwent a $33 million renovation and reopened in 2011, housing all divisions under one roof for the first time in the college's history.

== Divisions ==
=== Architecture ===
Director of the Division of Architecture - Daniel Butko.

The Division of Architecture offers a 150 credit Bachelor of Architecture and a 168 credit accelerated Master of Architecture, both five-year programs accredited by the National Architectural Accrediting Board and satisfies the requirement to partake in the Architectural Experience Program and eligibility to test in one of six divisions of the Architect Registration Exam. Also offered is a two year 60 credit Master of Architecture for students who hold a pre-professional degree in Architecture.

=== Interior Design ===
Director of the Division of Interior Design - Elizabeth Pober.

The Division of Interior Design offers a Bachelor of Interior Design, a program accredited by the Council for Interior Design Accreditation. Other programs offered are an Interior Design minor, Master of Interior Design (First Professional), and a Master of Interior Design (Post Professional).

=== Construction Science ===
Director of the Haskell and Irene Lemon Division of Construction Science - Ben Bigelow.

The Division of Construction Science offers a Bachelor of Science in Construction Science, Certificate in Entrepreneurship and Real Estate Development, Minor in Construction Science, M.S. in Construction Management.

=== Planning, Landscape Architecture & Design ===
Interim Director of the Division of PLAD - John Harris.

Bachelor of Science in Environmental Design, Master of Landscape Architecture, B.S. in Environmental Design & Landscape Architecture, Master of Regional + City Planning, B.S. in Environmental Design & Master of Regional + City Planning, and Master of Urban Design.
