= Clendon Thomas =

American football player (1935–2026)

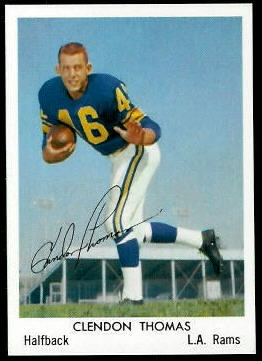
- Thomas with the Rams in 1959

No. 46, 35, 28
- Positions: Defensive back, end, flanker, halfback

Personal information
- Born: December 28, 1935; Oklahoma City, Oklahoma, U.S.
- Died: January 27, 2026 (aged 90); Tulsa, Oklahoma, U.S.
- Listed height: 6 ft 2 in (1.88 m)
- Listed weight: 196 lb (89 kg)

Career information
- High school: Southeast (Oklahoma City)
- College: Oklahoma (1954–1957)
- NFL draft: 1958: 2nd round, 19th overall pick

Career history
- Los Angeles Rams (1958–1961); Pittsburgh Steelers (1962–1968); Chicago Bears (1969)*
- * Offseason or practice squad member only

Awards and highlights
- Second-team All-Pro (1963); Pro Bowl (1963); Pittsburgh Steelers Legends team; 2× National champion (1955, 1956); Consensus All-American (1957); Second-team All-American (1956); 2× First-team All-Big Eight (1956, 1957); Second-team All-Big Seven (1955)

Career NFL statistics
- Interceptions: 27
- Fumble recoveries: 10
- Receptions: 60
- Receiving yards: 1,046
- Total touchdowns: 5
- Stats at Pro Football Reference
- College Football Hall of Fame

Clendon Thomas (December 28, 1935 – January 27, 2026) was an American professional football player who was a halfback and defensive back for 11 seasons in the National Football League (NFL). played college football for the Oklahoma Sooners.

== Life and career ==
Thomas attended the University of Oklahoma, where he played for the Sooners under coach Bud Wilkinson. He led the Sooners in scoring during both the 1956 and 1957 seasons, while also leading the nation in the category during the 1956 season. He helped lead the Sooners to back-to-back national championships in 1955 and 1956. He was a first-team all-conference selection his junior and senior years and was a consensus All-American his senior year. He also finished in ninth place in the Heisman Trophy balloting that season (the award was won by John David Crow that year).

In the 1958 NFL draft, Thomas was selected by the Los Angeles Rams in the second round. He played for the Rams for four seasons before being traded to the Pittsburgh Steelers where he played for another seven years and finished his career. He was selected to the Pro Bowl after the 1963 NFL season.

Thomas was selected for induction into the College Football Hall of Fame in 2011.

After retiring from football, Thomas had various business ventures. In 1978, he founded Chemical Products Corporation in Oklahoma City. The company manufactured water repellents treatments for concrete and similar surfaces. It was a pioneer in the use of siloxane-based chemistry.

Thomas died on January 27, 2026, at the age of 90.

== See also ==
- List of NCAA major college football yearly scoring leaders
