= Jimmy Harris (defensive back) =

American football player (1934–2011)

No. 20, 44, 40
- Position: Defensive back

Personal information
- Born: November 12, 1934; Terrell, Texas, U.S.
- Died: August 9, 2011 (aged 76); Shreveport, Louisiana, U.S.
- Listed height: 6 ft 1 in (1.85 m)
- Listed weight: 178 lb (81 kg)

Career information
- High school: Terrell
- College: Oklahoma (1953–1956)
- NFL draft: 1957: 5th round, 50th overall pick

Career history
- Philadelphia Eagles (1957); Los Angeles Rams (1958); Dallas Texans (1960); Dallas Cowboys (1961)

Awards and highlights
- 2× National champion (1955, 1956); First-team All-Big Seven (1955); Second-team All-Big Seven (1956)

Career NFL/AFL statistics
- Interceptions: 11
- Fumble recoveries: 5
- Total touchdowns: 1
- Stats at Pro Football Reference

James Bedford Harris (November 12, 1934 – August 9, 2011) was an American football defensive back in the National Football League (NFL) for the Philadelphia Eagles, Los Angeles Rams, and Dallas Cowboys. He also was a member of the Dallas Texans in the American Football League (AFL). He played college football at the University of Oklahoma.

== Early life ==
Harris, who was born in Terrell, Texas and attended Terrell High School, where he led the football team to state championship in 1953. Although he originally committed to Texas A&M University, to play for head coach Bear Bryant, head coach Bud Wilkinson convinced him to come to the University of Oklahoma, after getting him a job as a roughneck in the Oklahoma oil fields.

He played college football at the University of Oklahoma, where he was the starting quarterback during much of the Oklahoma Sooners' famed 47-game winning streak.

Harris went undefeated after becoming quarterback during the 1954 season, after starter Gene Calame suffered a right collar bone injury. He also was undefeated during the 1955 and 1956 seasons, leading the Sooners to national championships in both years.

He won all of his 25 starts, finishing with 39 completions out of 80 attempts for 745 yards, 10 passing touchdowns, 254 rushing attempts for 1,237 yards and 11 touchdowns.

In 2013, he was inducted into the Oklahoma Sports Hall of Fame.

== Professional career ==
=== Philadelphia Eagles ===
Harris was selected by the Philadelphia Eagles in the fifth round (50th overall) of the 1957 NFL draft. As a rookie, he was converted into a defensive back. On May 26, 1958, he was traded along with offensive tackle Buck Lansford and a number one draft choice (#2-Dick Bass), to the Los Angeles Rams in exchange for quarterback Norm Van Brocklin.

=== Los Angeles Rams ===
In 1958, he appeared in 12 games, tallying 4 interceptions. In 1960, he was traded to the Dallas Cowboys in exchange for a 1962 fifth round draft choice (#60-Jim Smith).

=== Dallas Texans ===
On April 14, 1960, he was signed as a free agent by the Dallas Texans of the American Football League, after spending the previous year coaching at the University of Oklahoma. He was temporarily blocked from joining the Texans until the court settled a suit filed by the Dallas Cowboys, to prevent him from playing for any other team. He appeared in 14 games and was mostly a backup player.

=== Dallas Cowboys ===
In 1961, he joined the Dallas Cowboys after the court ruled in their favor. He appeared in 11 games with 4 starts and made 2 interceptions. He retired at the end of the year.

== Personal life ==
Harris was an assistant football coach at the University of Oklahoma in 1959. After football, he co-owned an oil company named Midroc Operating Company. On August 9, 2011, he died of lung cancer.
