= Tommy McDonald (American football) =

American football player (1934–2018)

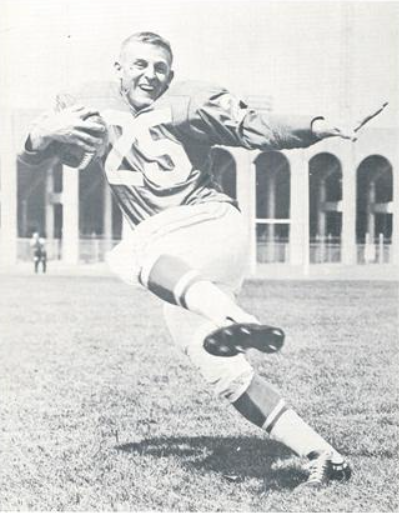
- McDonald in 1960

No. 25, 29, 8
- Position: Flanker

Personal information
- Born: July 26, 1934; Roy, New Mexico, U.S.
- Died: September 24, 2018 (aged 84); Audubon, Pennsylvania, U.S.
- Listed height: 5 ft 9 in (1.75 m)
- Listed weight: 178 lb (81 kg)

Career information
- High school: Highland (Albuquerque, New Mexico)
- College: Oklahoma (1954–1956)
- NFL draft: 1957: 3rd round, 31st overall pick

Career history
- Philadelphia Eagles (1957–1963); Dallas Cowboys (1964); Los Angeles Rams (1965–1966); Atlanta Falcons (1967); Cleveland Browns (1968)

Awards and highlights
- NFL champion (1960); 2× First-team All-Pro (1959, 1960); 3× Second-team All-Pro (1959, 1961, 1962); 6× Pro Bowl (1958–1962, 1965); NFL receiving yards leader (1961); 2× NFL receiving touchdowns leader (1958, 1961); NFL Hall of Fame (1998); Philadelphia Eagles Hall of Fame; Philadelphia Eagles 75th Anniversary Team; Philadelphia Sports Hall of Fame (2005); 2× National champion (1955, 1956); Maxwell Award (1956); SN College Player of the Year (1956); Consensus All-American (1956); First-team All-American (1955); 2× First-team All-Big Seven (1955, 1956)

Career NFL statistics
- Receptions: 495
- Receiving yards: 8,410
- Receiving touchdowns: 84
- Stats at Pro Football Reference
- Pro Football Hall of Fame
- College Football Hall of Fame

Thomas Franklin McDonald (July 26, 1934 – September 24, 2018) was an American professional football flanker who played in the National Football League (NFL) for the Philadelphia Eagles, the Dallas Cowboys, the Los Angeles Rams, the Atlanta Falcons, and the Cleveland Browns. He played college football as a halfback for the Oklahoma Sooners. He is a member of the Pro Football Hall of Fame and College Football Hall of Fame.

== Early life ==
McDonald agreed to repeat the eighth grade, because his father felt the extra time would give him a chance to grow. He attended Roy High School in Roy, New Mexico, with an enrollment of around 150 students during his freshman year, where he played quarterback.

As a sophomore, he transferred to Highland High School in Albuquerque. As a senior, he averaged over 20 yards per carry in football and set the state scoring record with 157 points.

He also set the city scoring record in basketball, and won five gold medals in the state track meet (100, 220, low hurdles and 2 relays).

== College career ==
McDonald accepted a football scholarship from the University of Oklahoma, after the Oklahoma basketball coach Bruce Drake, saw him play in an All-star football game in Albuquerque and encouraged him to have his parent write a letter to the football head coach Bud Wilkinson. Based on Drake's recommendation, Wilkinson invited McDonald to visit the school's campus and offered him a football scholarship soon thereafter.

In 1953, he spent the season on the freshman team. In 1954, he was a backup running back, registering 27 carries for 128 yards, 2 receptions for 28 yards and 2 touchdowns.

In 1955, he was named a starter at running back, tallying 114 carries for 715 yards (led the team), 16 rushing touchdowns (led the team), 7 receptions for 110 yards (second on the team) and one receiving touchdown (tied for the team lead). He also was a passer on the option play. He became the first player in school history to score a touchdown in every game of a season.

In 1956, he led the team with 119 carries for 853 yards, 12 rushing touchdowns, 12 receptions for 282 yards and 4 receiving touchdowns. At the end of the season he received the Maxwell Award as the nation's most outstanding college football player and finished third in the 1956 Heisman voting.

He excelled as a running back, never played in a losing game and was one of the key players during the school's 47-game winning streak. In 1985, he was inducted into the College Football Hall of Fame.

McDonald was also a member of the Delta Epsilon chapter of Sigma Nu fraternity while he was at Oklahoma.

== Professional career ==
=== Philadelphia Eagles ===
McDonald was selected by the Philadelphia Eagles in the third round of the 1957 NFL draft. As a rookie, he was moved to wide receiver after he replaced an injured Bill Stribling in the ninth game of the season, making a 61-yard reception and a 25-yard receiving touchdown from quarterback Sonny Jurgensen.

He was a part of the team that won the 1960 NFL Championship against Vince Lombardi’s Green Bay Packers. In the contest, he had a 35-yard touchdown reception from quarterback Norm Van Brocklin.

In 1961, he led the NFL in receiving yards (1,144) and touchdowns (13). Against the New York Giants, he had 7 receptions for 237 yards and 2 touchdowns, which still is a franchise single-game record.

On March 20, 1964, he was traded to the Dallas Cowboys in exchange for Sam Baker, John Meyers, and Lynn Hoyem.

=== Dallas Cowboys ===
In 1964, he was switched from flanker to split end, because the Cowboys already had an accomplished flanker in Franklin Clarke and split end Billy Howton had just retired. Looking to improve the receiving corps to help the young quarterback Don Meredith, they also traded with the Pittsburgh Steelers to get Buddy Dial.

In his only season with the club, he registered 46 receptions for 612 yards (13.3 average) and 2 touchdowns (one of them against the Eagles). In 1965, with the emergence of rookie Bob Hayes he was traded to the Los Angeles Rams in exchange for placekicker Danny Villanueva on May 14.

=== Los Angeles Rams ===
McDonald recorded a career-high 67 receptions for 1,036 yards and 9 touchdowns in 1965. He was selected to his last Pro Bowl. In 1967 he was traded to the Atlanta Falcons in exchange for a draft choice.

=== Atlanta Falcons ===
On September 10, 1968, he was waived following a season with 33 receptions for 436 yards and 4 touchdowns.

=== Cleveland Browns ===
In 1968, McDonald was picked up by the Cleveland Browns for whom he caught 7 receptions for 113 yards and one touchdown. With the retirement of Raymond Berry the previous year, McDonald was technically the league's active leader in career receiving yards during the off-season but was surpassed in Game 1 by Don Maynard.

His last NFL game was the 1968 NFL Championship Game against the Baltimore Colts. On March 15, 1969, he announced his retirement from pro football.

== NFL career statistics ==
Legend
	Won the NFL championship
	Led the league
**Bold**	Career high

=== Regular season ===
Year	Team	Games		Receiving				
Year	Team	GP	GS	Rec	Yds	Avg	Lng	TD
1957	PHI	12	3	9	228	**25.3**	61	3
1958	PHI	10	3	29	603	20.8	**91**	9
1959	PHI	12	12	47	846	18.0	71	10
1960	PHI	12	12	39	801	20.5	64	**13**
1961	PHI	**14**	**14**	64	1,144	17.9	66	**13**
1962	PHI	**14**	**14**	58	**1,146**	19.8	60	10
1963	PHI	**14**	**14**	41	731	17.8	75	8
1964	DAL	**14**	13	46	612	13.3	48	2
1965	RAM	**14**	**14**	**67**	1,036	15.5	51	9
1966	RAM	13	12	55	714	13.0	62	2
1967	ATL	**14**	11	33	436	13.2	75	4
1968	CLE	9	2	7	113	16.1	42	1
Career		152	124	495	8,410	17.0	91	84

== Legacy ==
McDonald was selected for six Pro Bowls, led the league in touchdown receptions twice (1958, 1961), and led the league in receiving yards once (1961). McDonald was the last non-kicker to play in the NFL without a facemask.

He finished his career with 495 receptions for 8,410 yards and 84 touchdowns, the second-highest total of touchdown receptions in NFL history at the time. He also rushed for 22 yards and gained 1,459 yards and a touchdown returning punts and kickoffs on special teams, giving him 9,891 career all-purpose yards. He was inducted into the Pro Football Hall of Fame in 1998.

== Personal life and death ==
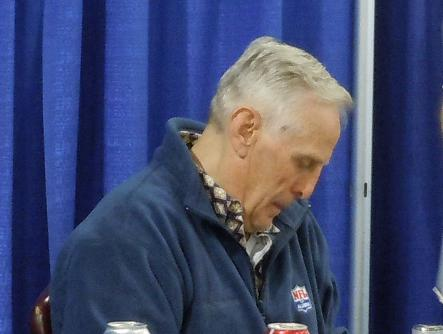
McDonald signing autographs in 2011

Following the Eagles NFL Championship victory, McDonald wrote an autobiography: They Pay Me to Catch Footballs, published by Chilton in 1962.

He also dabbled in art. He owned Tommy McDonald Enterprises, a studio that did portrait paintings and plaques, mainly of athletes. He did not paint the portraits himself, but had two painters who created them, although he signed them as being by McDonald (Enterprises). A portrait of Joe DiMaggio sold at auction for $4,000.

He became great friends with Pro Football Hall of Fame writer, Ray Didinger, who was a huge fan of Tommy's during his time with the Eagles. As a child, Didinger would spend time with Tommy at Eagles training camp in Hershey, Pennsylvania. Didinger helped get Tommy into the Hall of Fame, and then went on to present Tommy into the Hall of Fame. Didinger also wrote a 75-minute play, "Tommy and Me" which tells the tale of Ray and Tommy.

He died on September 24, 2018, at the age of 84. "Tommy McDonald lived life like he played the game of football," Pro Football Hall of Fame president and CEO C. David Baker said in a statement. "He was charismatic, passionate and had fun. He was such a character. Heaven is a happier place today.

He is one of at least 345 NFL players to be diagnosed after death with chronic traumatic encephalopathy (CTE), which is caused by repeated hits to the head.

== See also ==
- List of Pro Football Hall of Fame inductees
- List of NFL players with chronic traumatic encephalopathy
