= Billy Pricer =

American football player (1934–1999)

No. 31, 33
- Position: Running back

Personal information
- Born: September 3, 1934; Perry, Oklahoma, U.S.
- Died: September 24, 1999 (aged 65); Oklahoma City, Oklahoma, U.S.
- Listed height: 5 ft 10 in (1.78 m)
- Listed weight: 208 lb (94 kg)

Career information
- High school: Perry
- College: Oklahoma (1953–1956)
- NFL draft: 1957: 6th round, 65th overall pick

Career history
- Baltimore Colts (1957–1960); Dallas Texans (1961)

Awards and highlights
- 2× NFL champion (1958, 1959); 2× National champion (1955, 1956); 2× Second-team All-Big Seven (1955, 1956)

Career NFL/AFL statistics
- Rushing yards: 316
- Rushing average: 3.3
- Receptions: 15
- Receiving yards: 115
- Total touchdowns: 3
- Stats at Pro Football Reference

Billy Carol Pricer (September 3, 1934 – September 24, 1999) was an American professional football player who was a running back for five seasons for the Baltimore Colts and Dallas Texans. Played for the University of Oklahoma football team from 1954 to 1956. During this time he played under Bud Wilkinson and, as a Sooner, never lost a game. Went into the draft in 1957 and was selected in the 6th round (65th overall) by the Baltimore Colts.
