= Kurt Burris =

American gridiron football player (1932–1999)

Profile
- Positions: Center, Linebacker

Personal information
- Born: June 27, 1932; Nowata, Oklahoma, U.S.
- Died: July 21, 1999 (aged 67); Billings, Montana, U.S.
- Listed height: 6 ft 1 in (1.85 m)
- Listed weight: 210 lb (95 kg)

Career information
- College: Oklahoma
- NFL draft: 1955: 1st round, 13th overall pick

Career history
- 1955, 1957: Edmonton Eskimos
- 1958: Saskatchewan Roughriders
- 1960: Calgary Stampeders

Awards and highlights
- Grey Cup champion (1955); Consensus All-American (1954); 2× First-team All-Big Seven (1953, 1954)
- College Football Hall of Fame

Kurt Bane Burris (June 27, 1932 – July 21, 1999) was an American gridiron football player. He played college football as a center and linebacker for the University of Oklahoma from 1951 to 1954. He was a consensus All-American at center in 1954 and finished second in the 1954 Heisman Trophy voting. He was inducted into the College Football Hall of Fame in 1960.

Burris also played in the Western Interprovincial Football Union (WIFU), helping the Edmonton Eskimos win the 43rd Grey Cup in 1955. He played a total of four seasons in the WIFU, including stints with the Saskatchewan Roughriders (1958) and Calgary Stampeders (1960).

After his football career ended, Burris worked in the oil drilling business in Alberta, Colorado, and Montana.

== Early life ==
Burris was born in 1932 in Nowata, Oklahoma. He was raised in Muskogee, Oklahoma, in a family of 11 children. His five brothers all played college football, including older brother Buddy Burris who was a consensus All-American guard for Oklahoma in 1948. Their father, Paul Burris, coached all six of his sons.

Burris played on Muskogee High School football teams that won Oklahoma state championships in 1948 and 1950. The 1950 team compiled a 13–0 record, shut out six opponents, included Burris, his younger brother Bobby Burris, Max Boydston, and Preston Carpenter, and has been rated the best high school football team in Oklahoma during the post–World War II era.

Burris was recruited to play football by several universities and attended a six-week camp with the Army Cadets in the summer of 1951. He announced in August 1951 that he intended to play for Bud Wilkinson at Oklahoma.

== Oklahoma Sooners ==
Burris played college football for the Oklahoma Sooners from 1951 to 1954. He was a starter at center and linebacker on the 1953 and 1954 teams that won the first 19 games in Oklahoma's 47-game winning streak.

Burris was known for his blocking on offense and for his fierce tackling on defense. Brother Bob Burris, who played with Kurt at Oklahoma, recalled Kurt as a "headhunter" who "usually knocked two or three guys out of a game," adding, "Kurt wasn't happy with tackling a runner. He wanted to hit him in the nose."

As a senior, he was the consensus pick at center on the 1954 All-America team. The Helms Athletic Foundation selected him as the national player of the year for 1954. Oklahoma coach Bud Wilkinson concluded that Burris also deserved the Heisman Trophy. Realizing the sports press had ignored interior linemen in voting for the trophy, Wilkinson and Oklahoma sports information director Harold Keith recruited 100 students to write personal letters to the 3,500 sports editors. Alan Ameche won the Heisman in 1954, but Burris finished second in the voting, the highest finish in the history of the trophy for a lineman.

== Western Interprovincial Football Union ==
Burris was selected by the Cleveland Browns in the first round with the 13th overall pick in the 1955 NFL draft. He instead signed with the Edmonton Eskimos of the Western Interprovincial Football Union, which later became the West Division of the Canadian Football League. He played center and linebacker for the Eskimos, appearing in 15 games during the 1955 season and helping Edmonton win the 43rd Grey Cup championship. He missed the 1956 season due to a back injury but returned in 1957, appearing in 11 games for the Eskimos.

Burris was traded to the Saskatchewan Roughriders in 1958. He appeared in 13 games for the Roughriders. After the 1958 season, Burris was moved to Calgary by the oil drilling company he worked for and decided to sit out the 1959 season. Burris also noted that he had "played nearly 60 minutes a game" in 1958 and "had a couple of sore legs". He played handball and basketball to get back into shape and signed with the Calgary Stampeders in March 1960. He appeared in eight games for the 1960 Calgary team. He stopped playing after the 1960 season due to a knee injury that required surgery.

== Family, later years and honors ==
Burris married Rosemary Major in 1955 in Oklahoma City. They had three children: Kurt Major, Bryan Kyle, and Mary Jane.

Burris began working in the oil drilling business in 1957. He continued that work after his football career ended, working for the Commonwealth Drilling Ltd. in Calgary. He moved to Denver in 1974 to set up drilling operations for Westburne Drilling, Inc., the American branch of Canada's largest drilling company. He later formed his own company, Burris Drilling, in Denver. Burris later moved to Billings, Montana, where he was president of Cardinal Oil Company. He died in 1999 of an apparent heart attack at age 67 at his home in Billings.

He was posthumously inducted into the College Football Hall of Fame in April 2000. He was also inducted into the Oklahoma Sports Hall of Fame in 2015.
