= 1957 Pittsburgh Steelers season =

NFL Pittsburgh Steelers 1957 season

- Head coach: Buddy Parker
- Home stadium: Forbes Field

Results
- Record: 6–6
- Division place: 3rd NFL Eastern
- Playoffs: Did not qualify

The 1957 season was the Pittsburgh Steelers' 25th in the National Football League (NFL). For the first time, the Steelers' yellow helmets sported uniform numbers. They used these uniforms through the 1961 season.

== Pre-season ==
Game	Date	Opponent	Result	Record	Venue	Attendance	Sources
1	August 17	vs. Chicago Bears	L 7–24	0–1	Gator Bowl (Jacksonville, FL)	18,000	
2	August 24	vs. Cleveland Browns	L 13–28	0–2	Rubber Bowl (Akron, OH)	26,669	
3	September 2	at Philadelphia Eagles	W 17–12	1–2	Franklin Field (Philadelphia, PA)	14,250	
4	September 8	vs. Detroit Lions	W 20–14	2–2	Civic Stadium (Buffalo, NY)	20,630	
5	September 14	Chicago Bears	L 10–37	2–3	Pitt Stadium (Pittsburgh, PA)	24,689	
6	September 21	vs. Green Bay Packers	T 10–10	2–3–1	Metropolitan Stadium (Minneapolis, MN)	17,226	

== Regular season ==
=== Schedule ===
Game	Date	Opponent	Result	Record	Venue	Attendance	Recap
1	September 29	**Washington Redskins**	**W** 28–7	1–0	Forbes Field	27,452	Recap
2	October 5	**Cleveland Browns**	**L** 12–23	1–1	Forbes Field	35,570	Recap
3	October 13	**Chicago Cardinals**	**W** 29–20	2–1	Forbes Field	29,446	Recap
4	October 20	at **New York Giants**	**L** 0–35	2–2	Yankee Stadium	52,589	Recap
5	October 27	**Philadelphia Eagles**	**W** 6–0	3–2	Forbes Field	27,016	Recap
6	November 3	at Baltimore Colts	**W** 19–13	4–2	Memorial Stadium	42,575	Recap
7	November 10	at **Cleveland Browns**	**L** 0–24	4–3	Cleveland Stadium	53,709	Recap
8	November 24	Green Bay Packers	**L** 10–27	4–4	Forbes Field	29,701	Recap
9	December 1	at **Philadelphia Eagles**	**L** 6–7	4–5	Connie Mack Stadium	16,364	Recap
10	December 7	**New York Giants**	**W** 21–10	5–5	Forbes Field	19,772	Recap
11	December 15	at **Washington Redskins**	**L** 3–10	5–6	Griffith Stadium	22,577	Recap
12	December 22	at **Chicago Cardinals**	**W** 27–2	6–6	Comiskey Park	10,084	Recap
Note: Intra-division opponents are in **bold** text. Saturday night: October 5.

=== Game summaries ===
==== Week 1: vs. Washington Redskins ====
Week 1: Washington Redskins at Pittsburgh Steelers – Game summary

Quarter	1	2	3	4	Total
Redskins	0	0	7	0	**7**
**Steelers**	0	7	7	14	**28**

at Forbes Field, Pittsburgh, Pennsylvania

- Date: September 29
- Game attendance: 27,452
- Pro-Football-Reference.com

Game information

**First quarter**

- No scoring plays.

**Second quarter**

- PIT – Ray Mathews 25-yard pass from Earl Morrall (Gary Glick kick). Steelers 7–0.

**Third quarter**

- WAS – Jim Podoley 37-yard pass from Eddie LeBaron (Sam Baker kick). Tied 7–7.
- PIT – Dick Young 3-yard run (Gary Glick kick). Steelers 14–7.

**Fourth quarter**

- PIT – Jug Girard 42-yard pass from Earl Morrall (Gary Glick kick). Steelers 21–7.
- PIT – Jug Girard 32-yard pass from Earl Morrall (Gary Glick kick). Steelers 28–7.

**Top passers**

- WAS – Eddie LeBaron – 9/14, 109 yards, TD, 2 INT
- PIT – Earl Morrall – 15/32, 249 yards, 3 TD

**Top rushers**

- WAS – Don Bosseler – 9 rushes, 39 yards
- PIT – Dick Young – 16 rushes, 25 yards, TD

**Top receivers**

- WAS – Jim Podoley – 2 receptions, 73 yards, TD
- PIT – Jug Girard – 3 receptions, 84 yards, 2 TD

==== Week 2: vs. Cleveland Browns ====
Week 1: Washington Redskins at Pittsburgh Steelers – Game summary

Quarter	1	2	3	4	Total
**Browns**	0	10	3	10	**23**
Steelers	0	6	6	0	**12**

at Forbes Field, Pittsburgh, Pennsylvania

- Date: September 29
- Game attendance: 35,570
- Pro-Football-Reference.com

Game information
**First quarter**
- No scoring plays.

**Second quarter**

- CLE – Ray Renfro 32-yard pass from Chet Hanulak (Lou Groza kick). Browns 7–0.
- PIT – Earl Girard 21-yard pass from Earl Morrall (kick failed). Browns 7–6.
- CLE – Lou Groza 29-yard field goal. Browns 10–6.

**Third quarter**

- CLE – Lou Groza 45-yard field goal. Browns 13–6.
- PIT – Earl Girard 32-yard pass from Earl Morrall (kick failed). Browns 13–12.

**Fourth quarter**

- CLE – Lou Groza 14-yard field goal. Browns 16–12.
- CLE – Milt Campbell 25-yard pass from Tommy O'Connell (Lou Groza kick). Browns 23–12.

==== Week 3: vs. Chicago Cardinals ====
	1	2	3	4	Total
Cardinals	3	3	0	14	**20**
**Steelers**	12	14	0	3	**29**

at Forbes Field, Pittsburgh, Pennsylvania

- Game time:
- Game weather:
- Game attendance: 29,446
- Referee:
- TV announcers:

Scoring drives:

- Pittsburgh – Derby 2 run (kick blocked)
- Chicago Cardinals – FG Summerall 33
- Pittsburgh – Wells 96 kick return (kick failed)
- Chicago Cardinals – FG Summerall 27
- Pittsburgh – O'Neill 23 run with blocked kick (Girard kick)
- Pittsburgh – Morrall 1 run (Girard kick)
- Pittsburgh – FG Girard 15
- Chicago Cardinals – Sears 49 run (Summerall kick)
- Chicago Cardinals – McHan 1 run (Summerall kick)

==== Week 4: at New York Giants ====
	1	2	3	4	Total
Steelers	0	0	0	0	**0**
**Giants**	7	7	7	14	**35**

at Yankee Stadium, Bronx, New York

- Game time:
- Game weather:
- Game attendance: 52,589
- Referee:
- TV announcers:

Scoring drives:

- New York Giants – Schnelker 18 pass from Conerly (Agajanian kick)
- New York Giants – Schnelker 10 pass from Conerly (Agajanian kick)
- New York Giants – Rote 18 pass from Gifford (Agajanian kick)
- New York Giants – Patton 50 interception (Agajanian kick)
- New York Giants – MacAfee 28 pass from Clatterbuck (Agajainan kick)

==== Week 5: vs. Philadelphia Eagles ====
	1	2	3	4	Total
Eagles	0	0	0	0	**0**
**Steelers**	0	6	0	0	**6**

at Forbes Field, Pittsburgh, Pennsylvania

- Game time:
- Game weather:
- Game attendance: 27,016
- Referee:
- TV announcers:

Scoring drives:

- Pittsburgh – Mathews 35 pass from Morrall (kick failed)

==== Week 6: at Baltimore Colts ====
	1	2	3	4	Total
**Steelers**	0	7	7	5	**19**
Colts	6	0	7	0	**13**

at Memorial Stadium

- Game time:
- Game weather:
- Game attendance: 42,575
- Referee:
- TV announcers:

Scoring Drives:

- Baltimore – Berry 5 pass from Unitas (kick blocked)
- Pittsburgh – Mathews 48 pass from Morrall (Glick kick)
- Pittsburgh – Mathews 22 pass from Morrall (Glick kick)
- Baltimore – Shaw 8 run (Rechichar kick)
- Pittsburgh – FG Glick 16
- Pittsburgh – Safety, Unitas tackled by McPeak in end zone

==== Week 7: at Cleveland Browns ====
	1	2	3	4	Total
Steelers	0	0	0	0	**0**
**Browns**	3	7	7	7	**24**

at Cleveland Municipal Stadium, Cleveland, Ohio

- Game time:
- Game weather:
- Game attendance: 53,709
- Referee:
- TV announcers:

Scoring drives:

- Cleveland – FG Groza 34
- Cleveland – Renfro 49 pass from O'Connell (Groza kick)
- Cleveland – P. Carpenter 13 pass from O'Connell (Groza kick)
- Cleveland – Paul 89 fumble run (Groza kick)

==== Week 8: vs. Green Bay Packers ====
	1	2	3	4	Total
**Packers**	0	21	0	6	**27**
Steelers	0	3	7	0	**10**

at Forbes Field, Pittsburgh, Pennsylvania

- Game time:
- Game weather:
- Game attendance: 29,701
- Referee:
- TV announcers:

Scoring drives:

- Pittsburgh – FG Glick 17
- Green Bay – Starr 1 run (Cone kick)
- Green Bay – Ferguson 40 run (Cone kick)
- Green Bay – Parilli 5 run (Cone kick)
- Pittsburgh – McClairen 14 pass from Morrall (Glick kick)
- Green Bay – FG Cone 24
- Green Bay – FG Cone 12

==== Week 9: at Philadelphia Eagles ====
	1	2	3	4	Total
Steelers	3	0	3	0	**6**
**Eagles**	0	7	0	0	**7**

at Connie Mack Stadium, Philadelphia, Pennsylvania

- Game time:
- Game weather:
- Game attendance: 16,364
- Referee:
- TV announcers:

Scoring drives:

- Pittsburgh – FG Glick 17
- Philadelphia – Bielski 7 pass from Jurgensen (Walston kick)
- Pittsburgh – FG Glick 23

==== Week 10: vs. New York Giants ====
	1	2	3	4	Total
Giants	0	7	3	0	**10**
**Steelers**	7	7	0	7	**21**

at Forbes Field, Pittsburgh, Pennsylvania

- Game time:
- Game weather:
- Game attendance: 19,772
- Referee:
- TV announcers:

Scoring drives:

- Pittsburgh – Reger 14 fumble run (Glick kick)
- New York Giants – Gifford 40 pass from Conerly (Agajanian kick)
- Pittsburgh – Morrall 12 run (Glick kick)
- New York Giants – FG Agajanian 12
- Pittsburgh – Nickel 5 pass from Morrall (Glick kick)

==== Week 11: at Washington Redskins ====
	1	2	3	4	Total
Steelers	3	0	0	0	**3**
**Redskins**	0	3	0	7	**10**

at Griffith Stadium, Washington, DC

- Game time:
- Game weather:
- Game attendance: 22,577
- Referee:
- TV announcers:

Scoring drives:

- Pittsburgh – FG Glick 35
- Washington – FG Baker 45
- Washington – Baker 11 run (Baker kick)

==== Week 12: at Chicago Cardinals ====
	1	2	3	4	Total
**Steelers**	14	0	3	10	**27**
Cardinals	0	0	2	0	**2**

at Comiskey Park, Chicago, Illinois

- Game time:
- Game weather:
- Game attendance: 10,084
- Referee:
- TV announcers:

Scoring drives:

- Pittsburgh – McClairen 48 pass from Morrall (Derby kick)
- Pittsburgh – Rogel 1 run (Derby kick)
- Chicago Cardinals – Safety, Beatty snap to Girard went out of end zone
- Pittsburgh – FG Derby 34

=== Standings ===
NFL Eastern Conference
	W	L	T	PCT	CONF	PF	PA	STK
Cleveland Browns	9	2	1	.818	8–1–1	269	172	W1
New York Giants	7	5	0	.583	6–4	254	211	L3
Pittsburgh Steelers	6	6	0	.500	5–5	161	178	W1
Washington Redskins	5	6	1	.455	4–5–1	251	230	W3
Philadelphia Eagles	4	8	0	.333	4–6	173	230	L2
Chicago Cardinals	3	9	0	.250	2–8	200	299	L1

Note: Tie games were not officially counted in the standings until 1972.

== Roster ==
1957 Pittsburgh Steelers roster
Quarterbacks (QB): 16 Len Dawson; 18 Jack Kemp; 10 Earl Morrall; Running backs (RB): 33 Fran Rogel; 39 Sid Watson; 24 Billy Wells; 35 Dick Young; Wide receivers (WR): 41 Jug Girard P/K; 25 Ray Mathews; 87 Cy McClairen; 81 Elbie Nickel; 89 Perry Richards; Tight ends (TE)	Offensive linemen (OL): 57 Ed Beatty C; 72 Herman Lee T; 76 Willie McClung T/DT; 65 John Nisby G/DE; 62 Mike Sandusky G; 74 Frank Varrichione T; Defensive linemen (DL): 75 Joe Krupa DT; 79 Dave Liddick DT; 84 Bill McPeak DE; 86 Bob O'Neil DE; 70 Ernie Stautner DT	Linebackers (LB): 60 Dale Dodrill MLB; 64 Bill Priatko MLB; 50 John Reger OLB; 66 Aubrey Rozzell OLB; 53 George Tarasovic OLB/DE; Defensive backs (DB): 42 Dick Alban CB; 22 Fred Bruney S; 80 Jack Butler S; 20 Gene Cichowski S; 27 Dean Derby CB/RB/K; 26 Gary Glick CB/K; 34 Dick McCabe CB; Special teams (ST)	Reserve: -- Dale Atkeson RB (IR); 49 Bill Bowman RB (IR); 66 Jerry Leahy LB (IR); 64 Bill Michael G (IR); Rookies in italics
