= 1957 NFL draft =

National Football League Draft

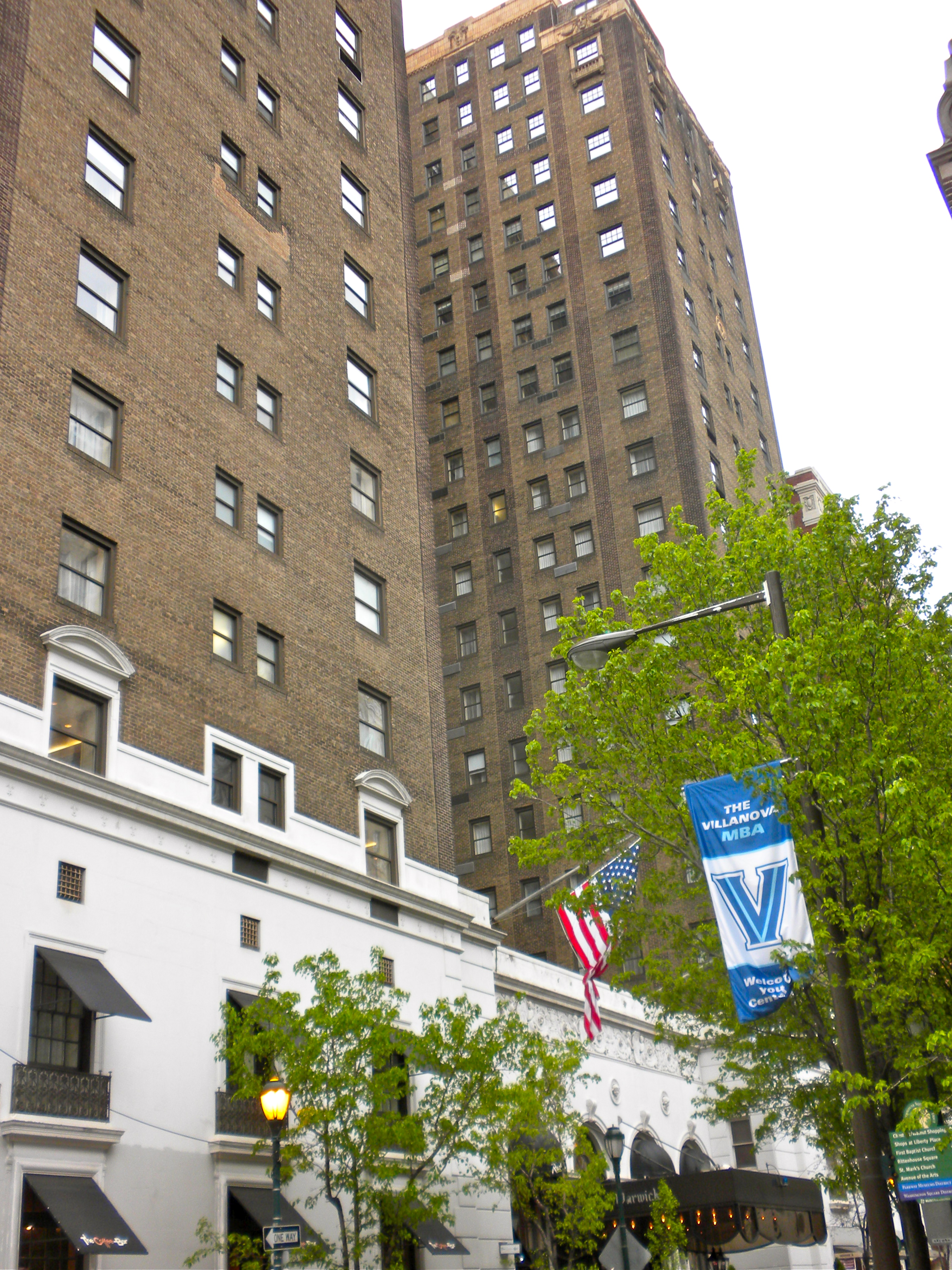
- The Warwick (venue for the first four rounds), photographed in 2010

General information
- Dates: November 26, 1956 & January 31, 1957
- Location: Warwick Hotel & The Bellevue-Stratford Hotel in Philadelphia, Pennsylvania

Overview
- 360 total selections in 30 rounds
- League: NFL
- First selection: Paul Hornung, HB; Green Bay Packers
- Mr. Irrelevant: Don Gest, E New York Giants
- Most selections (35): Los Angeles Rams
- Fewest selections (26): Chicago Cardinals
- Hall of Famers: 9: HB Paul Hornung; QB Len Dawson; FB Jim Brown; G Jim Parker; WR Tommy McDonald; QB Sonny Jurgensen; DT Henry Jordan; G Gene Hickerson; WR Don Maynard

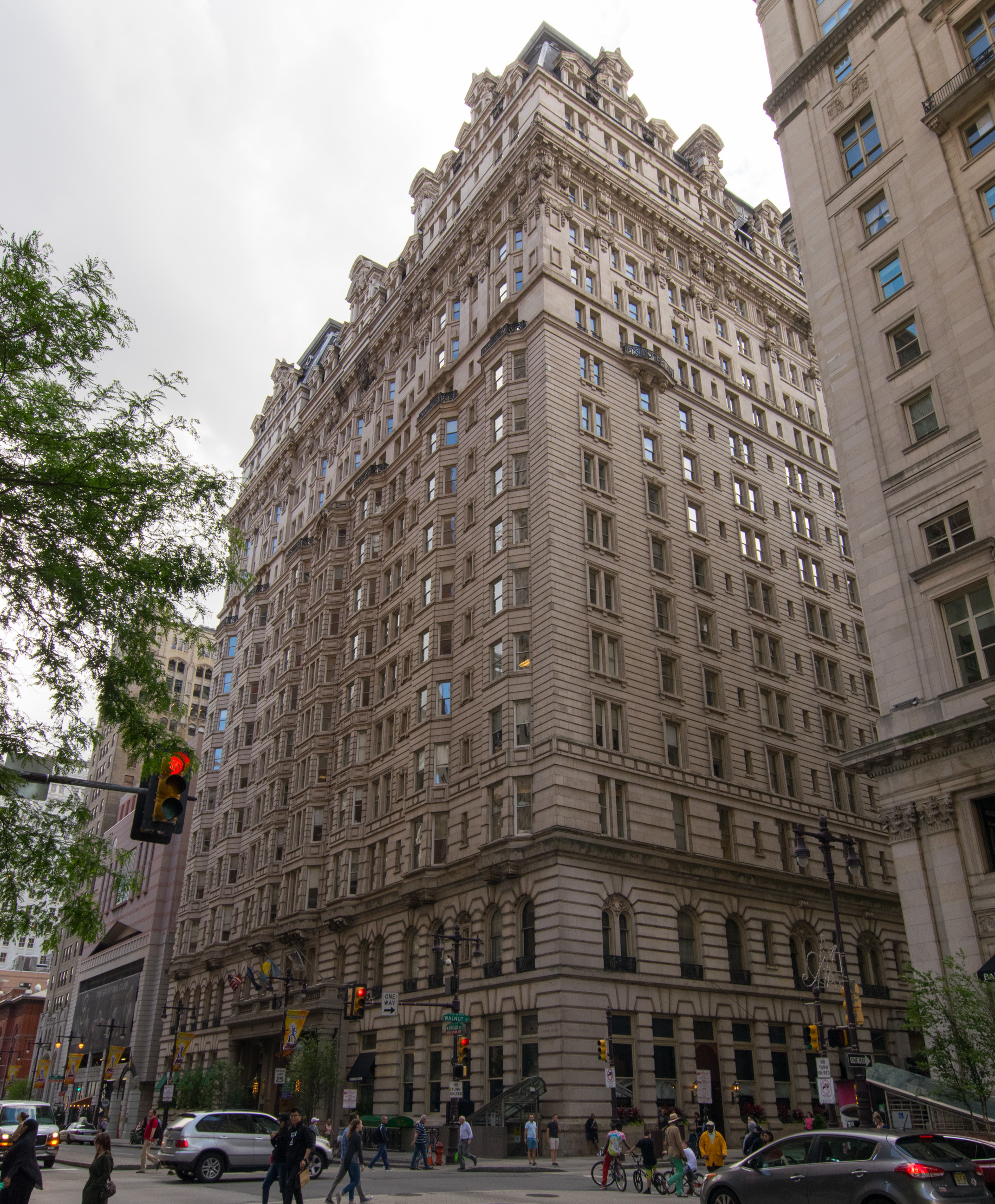
The Bellevue–Stratford (location of the final 26 rounds), photographed in 2017

The 1957 NFL draft had its first four rounds held on November 26, 1956, at the Warwick Hotel in Philadelphia, and its final twenty-six rounds on January 31, 1957, at the Bellevue-Stratford Hotel, also in Philadelphia.

This was the 11th year that the first overall pick was a bonus pick determined by lottery. With the previous ten winners ineligible for the draw, only the Chicago Cardinals and the Green Bay Packers had an equal chance of winning. The draft lottery was won by Green Bay, who selected halfback Paul Hornung.

== Player selections ==
= Hall of Famer	= Pro Bowler

=== Round 1 ===
Pick #	NFL team	Player	Position	College
1	Green Bay Packers ^{(Lottery bonus pick)}	Paul Hornung	Halfback	Notre Dame
2	Los Angeles Rams	Jon Arnett	Halfback	USC
3	San Francisco 49ers	John Brodie	Quarterback	Stanford
4	Green Bay Packers	Ron Kramer	End	Michigan
5	Pittsburgh Steelers	Len Dawson	Quarterback	Purdue
6	Cleveland Browns	Jim Brown	Fullback	Syracuse
7	Philadelphia Eagles	Clarence Peaks	Fullback	Michigan State
8	Baltimore Colts	Jim Parker	Guard	Ohio State
9	Washington Redskins	Don Bosseler	Fullback	Miami (FL)
10	Chicago Cardinals	Jerry Tubbs	Center	Oklahoma
11	Los Angeles Rams ^{(From New York Giants)}	Del Shofner	Back	Baylor
12	Detroit Lions	Bill Glass	End	Baylor
13	Chicago Bears	Earl Leggett	Tackle	LSU

=== Round 2 ===
Pick #	NFL team	Player	Position	College
14	Los Angeles Rams	Jack Pardee	Back	Texas A&M
15	San Francisco 49ers	Abe Woodson	Back	Illinois
16	Pittsburgh Steelers	Bill Michael	Tackle	Ohio State
17	Cleveland Browns	Milt Plum	Quarterback	Penn State
18	Green Bay Packers	Joel Wells	Back	Clemson
19	Philadelphia Eagles	Billy Ray Barnes	Back	Wake Forest
20	Baltimore Colts	Don Shinnick	Linebacker	UCLA
21	Washington Redskins	Joe Walton	End	Pittsburgh
22	Chicago Cardinals	Tom Maentz	End	Michigan
23	New York Giants	Sam DeLuca	Tackle	South Carolina
24	Detroit Lions	John Gordy	Tackle	Tennessee
25	Chicago Bears	Jim Swink	Back	TCU

=== Round 3 ===
Pick #	NFL team	Player	Position	College
26	Los Angeles Rams	Billy Ray Smith	Tackle	Arkansas
27	Los Angeles Rams	George Strugar	Tackle	Washington
28	Cleveland Browns	George Walker	Back	Arkansas
29	Green Bay Packers	Dalton Truax	Tackle	Tulane
30	Pittsburgh Steelers	Don Owens	Tackle	Mississippi Southern
31	Philadelphia Eagles	Tommy McDonald	Halfback	Oklahoma
32	Baltimore Colts	Luke Owens	Tackle	Kent State
33	Washington Redskins	Ed Sutton	Back	North Carolina
34	Chicago Cardinals	Bill Hudson	Tackle	Clemson
35	New York Giants	Dennis Mendyk	Back	Michigan State
36	Detroit Lions	Terry Barr	Halfback	Michigan
37	Chicago Bears	Ronnie Knox	Quarterback	UCLA

=== Round 4 ===
Pick #	NFL team	Player	Position	College
38	Los Angeles Rams	Bobby Cox	Quarterback	Minnesota
39	San Francisco 49ers	Jimmy Ridlon	Back	Syracuse
40	Washington Redskins	Jim Podoley	Back	Central Michigan
41	Green Bay Packers	Carl Vereen	Tackle	Georgia Tech
42	Cleveland Browns	Paul Camera	End	Stanford
43	Philadelphia Eagles	Sonny Jurgensen	Quarterback	Duke
44	Baltimore Colts	Jackie Simpson	Back	Florida
45	Washington Redskins	Vince Scorsone	Guard	Pittsburgh
46	San Francisco 49ers	Mike Sandusky	Tackle	Maryland
47	Los Angeles Rams	Lamar Lundy	End	Purdue
48	Detroit Lions	Steve Junker	End	Xavier
49	Chicago Bears	Jack Johnson	Back	Miami (FL)

=== Round 5 ===
Pick #	NFL team	Player	Position	College
50	Philadelphia Eagles	Jimmy Harris	Quarterback	Oklahoma
51	Los Angeles Rams	Dean Derby	Back	Washington
52	Cleveland Browns	Henry Jordan	Defensive tackle	Virginia
53	Cleveland Browns	Milt Campbell	Back	Indiana
54	Baltimore Colts	Ronnie Underwood	Back	Arkansas
55	Pittsburgh Steelers	Perry Richards	End	Detroit
56	San Francisco 49ers	Karl Rubke	Center	USC
57	Los Angeles Rams	Dick Enright	Guard	USC
58	Chicago Cardinals	Wayne Bock	Tackle	Illinois
59	Detroit Lions	John Barrow	Guard	Florida
60	Chicago Bears	Vic Zucco	Back	Michigan State
61	New York Giants	Larry Wesley	Tackle	Florida

=== Round 6 ===
Pick #	NFL team	Player	Position	College
62	San Francisco 49ers	Bill Rhodes	Back	Western State
63	Cleveland Browns	Joe Amstutz	Center	Indiana
64	Los Angeles Rams	Roy Wilkins	End	Georgia
65	Baltimore Colts	Billy Pricer	Back	Oklahoma
66	Pittsburgh Steelers	George Volkert	Back	Georgia Tech
67	Cleveland Browns	Harley Martin	Tackle	California
68	San Francisco 49ers	Jim Hunter	Back	Missouri
69	Washington Redskins	J. T. Frankenberger	Tackle	Kentucky
70	Green Bay Packers	John Nisby	Guard	Pacific
71	Detroit Lions	Ken Russell	Tackle	Bowling Green
72	Chicago Bears	Bo Dickinson	Back	Mississippi Southern
73	New York Giants	Bob Hobert	Tackle	Minnesota

=== Round 7 ===
Pick #	NFL team	Player	Position	College
74	Philadelphia Eagles	Tom Saidock	Tackle	Michigan State
75	Los Angeles Rams	Ed Gray	Tackle	Oklahoma
76	Green Bay Packers	Frank Gilliam	End	Iowa
77	Pittsburgh Steelers	Curley Johnson	Back	Houston
78	Cleveland Browns	Gene Hickerson	Tackle	Ole Miss
79	Baltimore Colts	Reuben Saage	Back	Baylor
80	San Francisco 49ers	Fred Dugan	End	Dayton
81	Washington Redskins	Wally Merz	Tackle	Colorado
82	Cleveland Browns	Mike Rotunno	Center	Michigan
83	Detroit Lions	Jerry Leahy	End	Colorado
84	Chicago Bears	Jerry DeLucca	Tackle	Middle Tennessee
85	New York Giants	Chuck Curtis	Quarterback	TCU

=== Round 8 ===
Pick #	NFL team	Player	Position	College
86	Philadelphia Eagles	Hal McElhaney	Back	Duke
87	Green Bay Packers	George Belotti	Center	USC
88	Los Angeles Rams	Roy Hord Jr.	Tackle	Duke
89	Cleveland Browns	Don Gillis	Center	Rice
90	Baltimore Colts	Jack Harmon	End	Eastern Oregon
91	Chicago Bears	Al Ward	Back	Yale
92	San Francisco 49ers	Ernie Pitts	End	Denver
93	Washington Redskins	Paul Lopata	End	Yale
94	Los Angeles Rams	Charlie Bradshaw	Tackle	Baylor
95	Detroit Lions	Dave Liddick	Tackle	George Washington
96	Chicago Bears	Bob Kilcullen	Tackle	Texas Tech
97	New York Giants	Johnny Bookman	Back	Florida

=== Round 9 ===
Pick #	NFL team	Player	Position	College
98	Philadelphia Eagles	Hal Davis	Back	Westminster (PA)
99	Los Angeles Rams	John Mitchell	Center	Texas Christian
100	Green Bay Packers	Ken Wineberg	Back	Texas Christian
101	Baltimore Colts	Bob White	Tackle	Otterbein
102	Pittsburgh Steelers	Charley Hutchings	Tackle	Miami (FL)
103	Cleveland Browns	Don Comstock	Back	Alabama
104	San Francisco 49ers	Charlie Brueckman	Center	Pittsburgh
105	Washington Redskins	Galen Laack	Guard	Pacific
106	Chicago Cardinals	Don McCumby	Tackle	Washington
107	Detroit Lions	John Nikkel	End	Texas Christian
108	Chicago Bears	Bill Brown	Guard	Syracuse
109	New York Giants	Don Maynard	Wide receiver	Texas-El Paso

=== Round 10 ===
Pick #	NFL team	Player	Position	College
110	Philadelphia Eagles	Don Bruhns	Center	Drake
111	Green Bay Packers	Gary Gustafson	Guard	Gustavus Adolphus
112	Los Angeles Rams	Warren Spragg	Tackle	Hillsdale
113	Pittsburgh Steelers	Ralph Jelic	Back	Pittsburgh
114	Cleveland Browns	Bob Reinhart	Back	San Jose State
115	Baltimore Colts	Joe Grisham	End	Austin Peay
116	San Francisco 49ers	Jerry Hurst	End	Middle Tennessee State
117	Washington Redskins	Don Dobrino	Back	Iowa
118	Chicago Cardinals	Don Carothers	End	Bradley
119	Detroit Lions	Tom Rychlec	End	American International
120	Chicago Bears	Bill Murphy	End	Fresno State
121	New York Giants	Gordon Massa	Center	Holy Cross

=== Round 11 ===
Pick #	NFL team	Player	Position	College
122	Philadelphia Eagles	Gil Shoaf	Tackle	Wabash
123	Los Angeles Rams	Don Smith	Tackle	Miami (OH)
124	Green Bay Packers	Jim Roseboro	Back	Ohio State
125	Cleveland Browns	Bill Cummings	Tackle	Ohio State
126	Baltimore Colts	Andy Nelson	Quarterback	Memphis State
127	Pittsburgh Steelers	Dick Hughes	Back	Tulsa
128	San Francisco 49ers	Tommy Davis	Back	Louisiana State
129	Washington Redskins	Dick Foster	Tackle	Idaho
130	Chicago Cardinals	Bob Kraus	Guard	Kansas
131	Detroit Lions	Carl Osterich	Center	Missouri
132	Chicago Bears	Roger Hampton	Back	McNeese State
133	New York Giants	Pat Burke	Guard	Michigan State

=== Round 12 ===
Pick #	NFL team	Player	Position	College
134	Philadelphia Eagles	Buddy Dike	Back	Texas Christian
135	Green Bay Packers	Ed Sullivan	Center	Notre Dame
136	Los Angeles Rams	Don Klochak	Back	North Carolina
137	Baltimore Colts	Don Simonic	Tackle	Tennessee Tech
138	Pittsburgh Steelers	Vern Ellison	Guard	Oregon State
139	Cleveland Browns	Rudy Spitzenberger	Guard	Houston
140	San Francisco 49ers	Fred Sington	Tackle	Alabama
141	Washington Redskins	Wade Mitchell	Quarterback	Georgia Tech
142	Chicago Cardinals	Bob Derrick	Back	Oklahoma
143	Detroit Lions	Charlie O'Brien	End	Valparaiso
144	Chicago Bears	Larry Sorenson	Tackle	Utah State
145	Green Bay Packers	Glenn Bestor	Back	Wisconsin

=== Round 13 ===
Pick #	NFL team	Player	Position	College
146	Philadelphia Eagles	Hubert Bobo	Linebacker	Ohio State
147	Los Angeles Rams	Bob Wolfenden	Back	Virginia Tech
148	Green Bay Packers	Jim Morse	Back	Notre Dame
149	Pittsburgh Steelers	Dwaine Underwood	Tackle	Oklahoma State
150	Cleveland Browns	Jerry Sansom	End	Auburn
151	Baltimore Colts	Jack Call	Back	Colgate
152	San Francisco 49ers	Charley Mackey	End	Arizona State
153	Washington Redskins	Claude Austin	Back	George Washington
154	Chicago Cardinals	Ed Ritt	Tackle	Montana State
155	Detroit Lions	Bill West	Back	Eastern Oregon
156	Chicago Bears	Don Williams	Back	Texas Tech
157	New York Giants	Ron Bennett	End	Mississippi State

=== Round 14 ===
Pick #	NFL team	Player	Position	College
158	Philadelphia Eagles	Jerry Cashman	Tackle	Syracuse
159	Green Bay Packers	Rudy Schoendorf	Tackle	Miami (OH)
160	Los Angeles Rams	Joe Lazzarino	Tackle	Maryland
161	Cleveland Browns	Don Feller	Back	Kansas
162	Baltimore Colts	Joe Guido	Back	Youngstown State
163	Pittsburgh Steelers	Jim Crawford	Back	Wyoming
164	San Francisco 49ers	Ron Warzeka	Tackle	Montana State
165	Washington Redskins	George Rice	Tackle	Wofford
166	Chicago Cardinals	Bob Fee	Back	Indiana
167	Detroit Lions	Phil Smith	Back	Jacksonville State
168	Chicago Bears	Bob Schmidt	Back	Memphis State
169	New York Giants	Dean Hesse	Tackle	East Texas State

=== Round 15 ===
Pick #	NFL team	Player	Position	College
170	Philadelphia Eagles	Mort Moriarity	End	Texas
171	Los Angeles Rams	Ed Hinman	Back	Wichita State
172	Green Bay Packers	Pat Hinton	Guard	Louisiana Tech
173	Baltimore Colts	Hall Whitley	Center	Texas A&I
174	Pittsburgh Steelers	Herman Canil	Tackle	Pittsburgh
175	Cleveland Browns	Dave Kaiser	End	Michigan State
176	San Francisco 49ers	Earl Kaiser	Back	Houston
177	Washington Redskins	Brad Bomba	End	Indiana
178	Chicago Cardinals	Bill Livingston	Center	Southern Methodist
179	Detroit Lions	Gene Alderton	Center	Maryland
180	Chicago Bears	Tony Hosek	End	West Virginia
181	New York Giants	Julius Derrick	End	South Carolina

=== Round 16 ===
Pick #	NFL team	Player	Position	College
182	Philadelphia Eagles	John Nocera	Back	Iowa
183	Green Bay Packers	Ed Buckingham	Tackle	Minnesota
184	Los Angeles Rams	John Luck	Tackle	Georgia
185	Baltimore Colts	Joe Cannavino	Running back	Ohio State
186	Cleveland Browns	John Bayuk	Back	Colorado
187	Baltimore Colts	Ed Prelock	Tackle	Kansas
188	San Francisco 49ers	Vic Kristopaitis	Back	Dayton
189	Washington Redskins	Joe Brodsky	Back	Florida
190	Chicago Cardinals	Terry Hurley	End	Montana
191	Detroit Lions	Hillmer Olson	Center	Virginia Tech
192	Chicago Bears	Ed Heuring	End	Maryland
193	New York Giants	Lou Deutschmann	Back	Louisiana State

=== Round 17 ===
Pick #	NFL team	Player	Position	College
194	Philadelphia Eagles	Dan Radakovich	Center	Penn State
195	Los Angeles Rams	Dave Trippett	Tackle	Hillsdale
196	Green Bay Packers	Don Boudreaux	Tackle	Houston
197	Cleveland Browns	Frank Tamburello	Back	Maryland
198	Baltimore Colts	Dan Wisniewski	Guard	Pittsburgh
199	Pittsburgh Steelers	Corny Salvaterra	Quarterback	Pittsburgh
200	San Francisco 49ers	Dave Kuhn	Center	Kentucky
201	Washington Redskins	Fred Brock	Back	Wheaton
202	Chicago Cardinals	Buddy Terry	Tackle	Houston
203	Detroit Lions	Jack Kemp	Quarterback	Occidental
204	Chicago Bears	Don Heine	End	Murray State
205	New York Giants	Jerry Stone	Center	Mississippi

=== Round 18 ===
Pick #	NFL team	Player	Position	College
206	Philadelphia Eagles	Billy Kelley	Tackle	Baylor
207	Green Bay Packers	Credell Green	Back	Washington
208	Los Angeles Rams	Clarence Cook	End	Nebraska
209	Baltimore Colts	Jim Villa	Back	Allegheny
210	Pittsburgh Steelers	Len Bigbee	End	East Texas State
211	Cleveland Browns	Laverne Torczon	Guard	Nebraska
212	San Francisco 49ers	Dick Guy	Guard	Ohio State
213	Washington Redskins	Ed Sakach	Guard	George Washington
214	Chicago Cardinals	Hal Smith	Back	UCLA
215	Detroit Lions	Jay Weering	Guard	Brigham Young
216	Chicago Bears	Al Wharton	Guard	Maryland
217	New York Giants	Jim Eaton	End	Florida

=== Round 19 ===
Pick #	NFL team	Player	Position	College
218	Philadelphia Eagles	Paul Harasimowicz	Tackle	Vermont
219	Los Angeles Rams	Bill Zuhowski	Tackle	Arizona State
220	Green Bay Packers	Ernie Danjean	Guard	Auburn
221	Pittsburgh Steelers	Phil Bennett	End	Miami (FL)
222	Cleveland Browns	Ken Ploen	Quarterback	Iowa
223	Baltimore Colts	Charlie Froehle	Guard	St. John's (MN)
224	San Francisco 49ers	Gene Babb	Back	Austin
225	Washington Redskins	John Bauer	Back	Villanova
226	Chicago Cardinals	Paul Barrington	Guard	Minnesota
227	Detroit Lions	Bob Gunderman	End	Virginia
228	Chicago Bears	Lee Hermsen	Back	Marquette
229	New York Giants	Ronnie Morris	Back	Tulsa

=== Round 20 ===
Pick #	NFL team	Player	Position	College
230	Philadelphia Eagles	Leroy Thompson	Back	Butler
231	Green Bay Packers	Percy Oliver	Guard	Illinois
232	Los Angeles Rams	Byron Beams	Tackle	Notre Dame
233	Cleveland Browns	Jack Stillwell	End	North Carolina
234	Baltimore Colts	Walt Livingston	Back	Heidelberg
235	Pittsburgh Steelers	John Szuehan	Tackle	North Carolina State
236	San Francisco 49ers	Sid DeLoatch	Guard	Duke
237	Washington Redskins	Buddy Frick	End	South Carolina
238	Chicago Cardinals	Tom Homer	Tackle	Kansas
239	Detroit Lions	Alex Lazzarino	Tackle	South Carolina
240	Chicago Bears	Al Frazier	Back	Florida A&M
241	New York Giants	Laneair Roberts	End	Georgia

=== Round 21 ===
Pick #	NFL team	Player	Position	College
242	Philadelphia Eagles	Charley Brooks	End	Michigan
243	Los Angeles Rams	Pat Pinkston	End	UCLA
244	Green Bay Packers	Chuck Mehrer	Tackle	Missouri
245	Baltimore Colts	Owen Mulholland	Back	Houston
246	Pittsburgh Steelers	Gene Cichowski	Quarterback	Indiana
247	Cleveland Browns	Curry Juneau	End	Southern Mississippi
248	San Francisco 49ers	Fred Wilcox	Back	Tulane
249	Washington Redskins	Sam Owen	Back	Georgia Tech
250	Chicago Cardinals	Joe Kopnisky	End	West Virginia
251	Detroit Lions	Dudley Meredith	Tackle	Lamar
252	Chicago Bears	Jerry Janes	End	Louisiana State
253	New York Giants	Joe Smaltz	Back	John Carroll

=== Round 22 ===
Pick #	NFL team	Player	Position	College
254	Philadelphia Eagles	John Simerson	Tackle	Purdue
255	Green Bay Packers	Ronnie Quillian	Quarterback	Tulane
256	Los Angeles Rams	Paige Cothren	Back	Mississippi
257	Pittsburgh Steelers	Aurealius Thomas	Guard	Ohio State
258	Cleveland Browns	Bob Winters	Quarterback	Utah State
259	Baltimore Colts	Chet Van Atta	Tackle	Kansas
260	San Francisco 49ers	Paul Tripp	Tackle	Idaho State
261	Washington Redskins	Ed Voytek	Guard	Purdue
262	Chicago Cardinals	Don Sizemore	Back	Hardin–Simmons
263	Detroit Lions	Tom Schulte	End	Eastern Kentucky
264	Chicago Bears	Tom Dalzell	Tackle	Virginia Tech
265	New York Giants	Jim Niemann	Back	Cincinnati

=== Round 23 ===
Pick #	NFL team	Player	Position	College
266	Philadelphia Eagles	Lou Lovely	Guard	Boston University
267	Los Angeles Rams	Dalva Allen	Tackle	Houston
268	Green Bay Packers	John Symank	Back	Florida
269	Cleveland Browns	Jim Frazer	Tackle	Hampden-Sydney
270	Baltimore Colts	Connie Baird	End	Hardin–Simmons
271	Pittsburgh Steelers	Bob Pollock	Tackle	Pittsburgh
272	San Francisco 49ers	John Thomas	End	Pacific
273	Washington Redskins	Al Viola	Guard	Northwestern
274	Chicago Cardinals	Milt Konicek	Tackle	Duke
275	Detroit Lions	George Gillar	Back	Texas A&M
276	Chicago Bears	Don Peroyea	Tackle	Southeastern Louisiana
277	New York Giants	Jack Healy	Back	Maryland

=== Round 24 ===
Pick #	NFL team	Player	Position	College
278	Philadelphia Eagles	Dennis McGill	Back	Yale
279	Green Bay Packers	Charlie Leyendecker	Tackle	Southern Methodist
280	Los Angeles Rams	Darryl Rogers	Back	Fresno State
281	Baltimore Colts	Harwood Hoeft	End	South Dakota State
282	Pittsburgh Steelers	Gary Francis	End	Illinois
283	Cleveland Browns	Allen Napoleon	Back	Stanford
284	San Francisco 49ers	John Ladner	End	Wake Forest
285	Washington Redskins	Bob Jennings	Center	Furman
286	Chicago Cardinals	Ron Klim	Center	West Virginia
287	Detroit Lions	Joe Scales	Back	Vanderbilt
288	Chicago Bears	Ken Lutterback	Back	Evansville
289	New York Giants	Don Hicks	Tackle	Florida

=== Round 25 ===
Pick #	NFL team	Player	Position	College
290	Philadelphia Eagles	Bob Ratliff	Back	West Texas State
291	Los Angeles Rams	Jimmy Orr	Back	Georgia
292	Green Bay Packers	Jerry Johnson	Tackle	St. Norbert
293	Pittsburgh Steelers	Jim Hinesly	End	Michigan State
294	Cleveland Browns	Tom Dimitroff	Back	Miami (OH)
295	Baltimore Colts	Harlan Geach	Tackle	College of Idaho
296	San Francisco 49ers	Ray Meyer	Back	Lamar
297	Washington Redskins	Dick Sassels	Tackle	Catawba
298	Chicago Cardinals	Ray Volz	Back	Denison
299	Detroit Lions	Carl Johnson	Back	South Dakota
300	Chicago Bears	Joe Ryan	Center	Villanova
301	New York Giants	Jerry Goebel	Center	Michigan

=== Round 26 ===
Pick #	NFL team	Player	Position	College
302	Philadelphia Eagles	Al Richardson	Tackle	Grambling
303	Green Bay Packers	Buddy Bass	End	Duke
304	Los Angeles Rams	Dick Blakely	Back	Minnesota
305	Cleveland Browns	Allen Bliss	End	Miami (OH)
306	Baltimore Colts	Joe Unitas	Tackle	Louisville
307	Pittsburgh Steelers	Bob Swann	Tackle	Vanderbilt
308	San Francisco 49ers	Tom Topping	Tackle	Duke
309	Washington Redskins	Paul Rotenberry	Back	Georgia Tech
310	Chicago Cardinals	Ted Rohde	Back	Kansas
311	Detroit Lions	Ed Muelhaupt	Guard	Iowa State
312	Chicago Bears	Gehrig Harris	Back	Grambling
313	New York Giants	Emmett Zalenka	Guard	Tulane

=== Round 27 ===
Pick #	NFL team	Player	Position	College
314	Philadelphia Eagles	Frank Hall	Back	USC
315	Los Angeles Rams	Clancy Osborne	End	Arizona State
316	Green Bay Packers	Marty Booher	Tackle	Wisconsin
317	Baltimore Colts	Len DeMalon	Guard	St. Vincent
318	Pittsburgh Steelers	Bob Konkoly	Back	Xavier
319	Cleveland Browns	Andy Okulovich	Back	Ohio State
320	San Francisco 49ers	Don Vicic	Back	Ohio State
321	Washington Redskins	Ormand Anderson	Tackle	Georgia Tech
322	Chicago Cardinals	Bob Butorovich	Tackle	Montana State
323	Detroit Lions	Dick Trafas	End	St. Thomas (MN)
324	Chicago Bears	Nick Brown	Guard	Fresno State
325	New York Giants	Carl Brawley	Tackle	Sul Ross

=== Round 28 ===
Pick #	NFL team	Player	Position	College
326	Philadelphia Eagles	Clem Corona	Guard	Michigan
327	Green Bay Packers	Dave Herbold	Guard	Minnesota
328	Los Angeles Rams	Bob Gudath	End	Compton J.C.
329	Pittsburgh Steelers	Frank Kilinsky	Tackle	Tennessee
330	Cleveland Browns	Gene Cockrell	Tackle	Hardin–Simmons
331	Baltimore Colts	Walt Schnieter	Tackle	Colorado
332	San Francisco 49ers	Bill Curtis	Back	Texas Christian
333	Washington Redskins	Guy Martin	Back	Colgate
334	Chicago Cardinals	Hugh Husser	End	Southeastern Louisiana
335	Detroit Lions	Joe Smith	Back	Houston
336	Chicago Bears	Tom Emerson	Guard	Oklahoma
337	New York Giants	Corky Gaines	Guard	South Carolina

=== Round 29 ===
Pick #	NFL team	Player	Position	College
338	Philadelphia Eagles	John Niznik	End	Wake Forest
339	Los Angeles Rams	Dean Maas	Center	Minnesota
340	Green Bay Packers	Howie Dare	Back	Maryland
341	Cleveland Browns	Bill Trozzo	Tackle	West Virginia
342	Baltimore Colts	Bob Rasmussen	Guard	Minnesota
343	Pittsburgh Steelers	Tom Ramage	Guard	Utah State
344	San Francisco 49ers	Vern Hallbeck	Back	Texas Christian
345	Washington Redskins	George Benedict	End	Springfield
346	Chicago Cardinals	Lee Corso	Back	Florida State
347	Detroit Lions	Hugh Martin	Guard	Pomona
348	Chicago Bears	Donnie Caraway	Back	Houston
349	New York Giants	Mike Bowman	Guard	Princeton

=== Round 30 ===
Pick #	NFL team	Player	Position	College
350	Philadelphia Eagles	Larry Hubbard	End	Marquette
351	Los Angeles Rams	Lee Williams	Back	Ohio State
352	Baltimore Colts	Bob Bailey	End	Thiel
353	Pittsburgh Steelers	Don Serier	End	Arkansas State
354	Cleveland Browns	Bob McKiever	Back	Northwestern
355	San Francisco 49ers	George Parks	Back	Lamar
356	Washington Redskins	Art Luppino	Back	Arizona
357	Chicago Cardinals	Frank Gibson	Tackle	Kansas
358	Detroit Lions	Mike Shill	Tackle	Furman
359	Chicago Bears	Sam Wesley	Back	Oregon State
360	New York Giants	Don Gest	End	Washington State

= Pro Bowler	= Hall of Famer

== Hall of Famers ==
- Jim Brown, fullback from Syracuse taken 1st round 6th overall by the Cleveland Browns.

Inducted: Professional Football Hall of Fame class of 1971.

- Jim Parker, guard from Ohio State taken 1st round 8th overall by the Baltimore Colts.

Inducted: Professional Football Hall of Fame class of 1973.

- Sonny Jurgensen, quarterback from Duke taken 4th round 43rd overall by the Philadelphia Eagles.

Inducted: Professional Football Hall of Fame class of 1983.

- Paul Hornung, running back from Notre Dame taken 1st round 1st overall by the Green Bay Packers.

Inducted: Professional Football Hall of Fame class of 1986.

- Len Dawson, quarterback from Purdue taken 1st round 5th overall by the Pittsburgh Steelers.

Inducted: Professional Football Hall of Fame class of 1987.

- Don Maynard, wide receiver from Texas Western taken 9th round 109th overall by the New York Giants.

Inducted: Professional Football Hall of Fame class of 1987.

- Henry Jordan, defensive tackle from Virginia taken 5th round 52nd overall by the Cleveland Browns.

Inducted: Professional Football Hall of Fame class of 1995.

- Tommy McDonald, wide receiver from Oklahoma taken 3rd round 31st overall by the Philadelphia Eagles.

Inducted: Professional Football Hall of Fame class of 1998.

- Gene Hickerson, offensive guard from the University of Mississippi taken 7th round 78th overall by the Cleveland Browns.

Inducted: Professional Football Hall of Fame class of 2007.

== Notable undrafted players ==
^{†}	= Pro Bowler

Original NFL team	Player	Pos.	College	Notes
Cleveland Browns	Vince Costello	LB	Ohio	
Washington Redskins	Ed Khayat	DE	Tulane	
