= 1957 BC Lions season =

Canadian football team season

- General manager: Herb Capozzi
- Head coach: Clem Crowe
- Home stadium: Empire Stadium

Results
- Record: 4–11–1
- Division place: 4th, W.I.F.U.
- Playoffs: did not qualify

Uniform

The 1957 BC Lions finished the season in fourth place in the W.I.F.U. with a 4–11–1 record.

Before the season, many media sources predicted the Lions to be playoff bound, however, after going through six different quarterbacks and an eight-game losing streak, the Lions finished out of the playoffs yet again.

The biggest appointment during the 1957 season was the hiring of former Montreal Alouette Herb Capozzi as general manager. Over nine seasons, Capozzi would eventually build the expansion doormats into a powerhouse that would appear in the Grey Cup in 1963 and win it in 1964.

WIFU all-stars were running back By Bailey and Ed Sharkey at both offensive guard and linebacker.

The helmet was kept orange with single black stripe.

== Preseason ==
Game	Date	Opponent	Results		Venue	Attendance
Game	Date	Opponent	Score	Record	Venue	Attendance
A	Sat, July 27	vs. Calgary Stampeders	L 14–19	0–1	Empire Stadium	15,454
B	Fri, Aug 2	vs. Edmonton Eskimos	L 8–29	0–2	Multnomah Stadium	
C	Mon, Aug 5	vs. Edmonton Eskimos	L 11–14	0–3	Empire Stadium	
D	Sun, Aug 11	vs. Edmonton Eskimos	L 6–9	0–4	Kezar Stadium	16,000

== Regular season ==
=== Season standings ===
Western Interprovincial Football Union
Team	GP	W	L	T	PF	PA	Pts
Edmonton Eskimos	16	14	2	0	475	142	28
Winnipeg Blue Bombers	16	12	4	0	406	300	24
Calgary Stampeders	16	6	10	0	221	413	12
BC Lions	16	4	11	1	284	369	9
Saskatchewan Roughriders	16	3	12	1	276	438	7

=== Season schedule ===
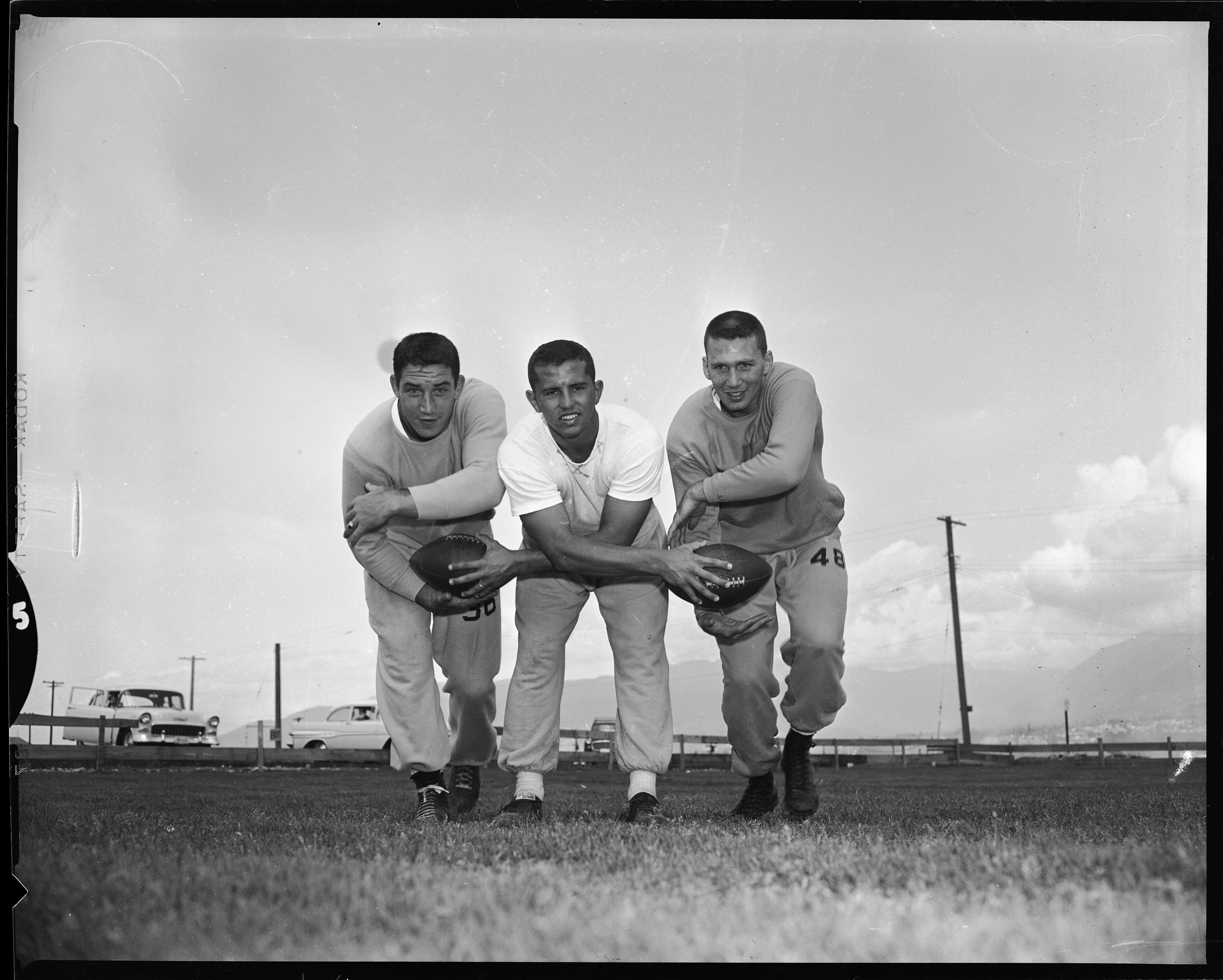
Don Vicic, Ron Vann, and Paul Cameron

Game	Date	Opponent	Results		Venue	Attendance
Game	Date	Opponent	Score	Record	Venue	Attendance
1	Sat, Aug 17	vs. Saskatchewan Roughriders	W 44–20	1–0	Empire Stadium	26,807
2	Mon, Aug 19	at Calgary Stampeders	L 1–8	1–1	Mewata Stadium	10,000
3	Mon, Aug 26	vs. Calgary Stampeders	L 20–22	1–2	Empire Stadium	28,100
4	Fri, Aug 30	at Winnipeg Blue Bombers	L 14–20	1–3	Winnipeg Stadium	16,442
5	Mon, Sept 2	at Saskatchewan Roughriders	L 13–28	1–4	Taylor Field	14,497
6	Sat, Sept 7	vs. Edmonton Eskimos	L 13–35	1–5	Empire Stadium	26,121
7	Sun, Sept 14	at Edmonton Eskimos	L 6–25	1–6	Clarke Stadium	17,500
8	Mon, Sept 16	vs. Winnipeg Blue Bombers	L 21–41	1–7	Empire Stadium	22,218
9	Wed, Sept 25	at Calgary Stampeders	L 21–22	1–8	Mewata Stadium	11,000
10	Mon, Sept 30	vs. Saskatchewan Roughriders	T 21–21	1–8–1	Empire Stadium	19,398
11	Mon, Oct 7	vs. Calgary Stampeders	W 27–1	2–8–1	Empire Stadium	16,928
12	Sat, Oct 12	at Winnipeg Blue Bombers	W 22–16	3–8–1	Winnipeg Stadium	14,700
13	Mon, Oct 14	at Saskatchewan Roughriders	W 30–10	4–8–1	Taylor Field	10,061
14	Sat, Oct 19	vs. Edmonton Eskimos	L 12–29	4–9–1	Empire Stadium	24,619
15	Sat, Oct 26	at Edmonton Eskimos	L 0–29	4–10–1	Clarke Stadium	14,000
16	Sat, Nov 2	vs. Winnipeg Blue Bombers	L 19–42	4–11–1	Empire Stadium	17,695

=== Offensive leaders ===
Player	Passing yds	Rushing yds	Receiving yds	TD
Maury Duncan	1827	-133	0	0
By Bailey		885	188	11
Paul Cameron	57	514	593	4
Jerry Janes		0	503	6
Don Vicic		399	44	3
Dan Edwards		0	357	0

== 1957 Canadian Football Awards ==
None
