= 1957 Philadelphia Eagles season =

1957 Philadelphia Eagles football season

- Owner: Happy Hundred
- Head coach: Hugh Devore

Results
- Record: 4–8
- Division place: 5th NFL Eastern
- Playoffs: Did not qualify

The 1957 Philadelphia Eagles season was their 25th in the league. They improved on their previous output of 3–8–1, winning four games. The team failed to qualify for the playoffs for the eighth consecutive season.

== Offseason ==
=== NFL draft ===
The 1957 NFL draft was held on November 27, 1956. This was before the end of the NFL season and the between time of NCAA college football season end and the college bowl games. The draft once again was 30 rounds long, 12 teams picking, and a total of 360 players selected. This again was a year that there was a Lottery bonus pick. This year's team to get the overall number 1 pick in the draft was the Green Bay Packers that selected, 1956 Heisman Trophy winner, Paul Hornung who was a halfback out of Notre Dame

=== Player selections ===
1957 Philadelphia Eagles draft
Round	Pick	Player	Position	College	Notes
1	7	Clarence Peaks	FB	Michigan State	
2	19	Billy Ray Barnes *	HB	Wake Forest	
3	31	Tommy McDonald * ^{†}	WR	Oklahoma	
4	43	Sonny Jurgensen * ^{†}	QB	Duke	
5	50	Jimmy Harris	DB	Oklahoma	
7	74	Tom Saidock	DT	Michigan State	
8	86	Hal McElhaney	B	Duke	
9	98	Harold Davis	B	Westminster (PA)	
10	110	Don Bruhns	C	Drake	
11	122	Gil Shoaf	T	Wabash	
12	134	Buddy Dike	B	TCU	
13	146	Hubert Bobo	LB	Ohio State	
14	158	Jerry Cashman	T	Syracuse	
15	170	Mort Moriarity	E	Texas	
16	182	John Nocera	LB	Iowa	Made roster in 1959
17	194	Dan Radakovich	C	Penn State	
18	206	Billy Kelley	T	Baylor	
19	218	Paul Harasimowicz	T	Vermont	
20	230	Leroy Thompson	B	Butler	
21	242	Charley Brooks	E	Michigan	
22	254	John Simerson	C	Purdue	
23	266	Lou Lovely	G	Boston University	
24	278	Dennis McGill	B	Yale	
25	290	Bob Ratliff	B	West Texas State	
26	302	Al Richardson	DE	Grambling	
27	314	Frank Hall	B	USC	
28	326	Clem Corona	G	Michigan	
29	338	John Niznik	E	Wake Forest	
30	350	Larry Hubbard	E	Marquette	
Made roster * Made at least one Pro Bowl during career

== Schedule ==
Week	Date	Opponent	Result	Record	Venue	Attendance
1	September 29	at Los Angeles Rams	**L** 13–17	0–1	Los Angeles Memorial Coliseum	62,506
2	October 5	**New York Giants**	**L** 20–24	0–2	Connie Mack Stadium	28,342
3	October 13	at **Cleveland Browns**	**L** 7–24	0–3	Cleveland Municipal Stadium	53,493
4	October 20	**Cleveland Browns**	**W** 17–7	1–3	Connie Mack Stadium	22,443
5	October 27	at **Pittsburgh Steelers**	**L** 0–6	1–4	Forbes Field	27,016
6	November 3	at **Chicago Cardinals**	**W** 38–21	2–4	Comiskey Park	18,718
7	November 10	Detroit Lions	**L** 16–27	2–5	Connie Mack Stadium	29,320
8	November 17	at **New York Giants**	**L** 0–13	2–6	Yankee Stadium	42,845
9	November 24	**Washington Redskins**	**W** 21–12	3-6	Connie Mack Stadium	20,730
10	December 1	**Pittsburgh Steelers**	**W** 7–6	4–6	Connie Mack Stadium	16,364
11	December 8	at **Washington Redskins**	**L** 7–42	4–7	Griffith Stadium	21,304
12	December 14	**Chicago Cardinals**	**L** 27–31	4–8	Connie Mack Stadium	12,555
Note: Intra-conference opponents are in **bold** text.

=== Standings ===
NFL Eastern Conference
	W	L	T	PCT	CONF	PF	PA	STK
Cleveland Browns	9	2	1	.818	8–1–1	269	172	W1
New York Giants	7	5	0	.583	6–4	254	211	L3
Pittsburgh Steelers	6	6	0	.500	5–5	161	178	W1
Washington Redskins	5	6	1	.455	4–5–1	251	230	W3
Philadelphia Eagles	4	8	0	.333	4–6	173	230	L2
Chicago Cardinals	3	9	0	.250	2–8	200	299	L1

Note: Tie games were not officially counted in the standings until 1972.

== Roster ==
(All time List of Philadelphia Eagles players in franchise history)

= 1957 Pro Bowl	= Hall of Famer

- + = Was a Starter in the Pro-Bowl

NO.	Player	AGE	POS	GP	GS	WT	HT	YRS	College
	Hugh Devore		COACH	_{1957 record} 4–8–0	_{Eagles; Lifetime} 7–16–1	_{NFL; Lifetime} 7–18–1		2nd	University of Notre Dame
33	Billy Ray Barnes	22	HB	12	0	201	5–11	Rookie	Wake Forest
60	Chuck Bednarik	32	LB-C	11	0	233	6–3	8	Pennsylvania Quakers
81	Eddie Bell	26	DB-LB	12	0	212	6–1	2	Pennsylvania
36	Dick Bielski	25	E-FB	12	0	224	6–1	2	Maryland Terrapins
40	Tom Brookshier	26	DB	12	0	196	6–0	4	Colorado Buffalos
84	Hank Burnine	25	E	7	0	188	6–2	1	Missouri
78	Marion Campbell	28	_{DE-DT-MG; G-T}	10	0	250	6–3	3	Georgia
10	Al Dorow	28	QB	6	0	193	6–0	3	Michigan State
64	Bob Gaona	26	T	12	0	243	6–3	4	Wake Forest
64	Abe Gibron	32	G	12	0	243	5–11	8	Purdue, Valparaiso
20	Jimmy Harris	23	DB	12	0	178	6–1	Rookie	Oklahoma Sooners
42	Bob Hudson	27	DB-LB-E	12	0	225	6–4	6	Clemson Tigers
63	Ken Huxhold	28	G	12	0	226	6–1	3	Wisconsin Badgers
9	Sonny Jurgensen	23	QB	10	5	202	5–11	Rookie	Duke
23	Ken Keller	23	HB	12	0	180	5–10	1	North Carolina Tarheels
68	Bill Koman	23	LB	11	11	229	6–2	1	North Carolina
79	Buck Lansford	24	G-T	10	10	232	6–2	2	Texas Longhorns
65	Menil Mavraides	26	G	12	0	235	6–1	3	Notre Dame Fighting Irish
25	Tommy McDonald	23	_{FL-HB; SE-WR}	12	0	178	5–9	Rookie	Oklahoma Sooners
41	Jerry Norton	26	DB-HB	12	0	195	5–11	3	SMU Mustangs
26	Clarence Peaks	22	FB	12	0	218	6–1	Rookie	Michigan State
44	Pete Retzlaff	26	E-HB-TE	12	0	211	6–1	1	South Dakota St. Jackrabbits
45	Rocky Ryan	25	DB-E	9	0	202	6–1	1	Illinois
75	Tom Saidock	27	DT	11	5	261	6–5	Rookie	Michigan State
82	Tom Scott	27	DE-LB	12	0	218	6–2	4	Virginia
53	John Simerson	22	C-T	12	12	257	6–3	Rookie	Purdue Boilermakers
80	Bill Stribling	30	E	12	0	206	6–1	6	Mississippi
76	Len Szafaryn	29	T-G-LB-DT	1	1	226	6–2	8	North Carolina
11	Bobby Thomason	29	QB	12	7	196	6–1	8	VMI
83	Bobby Walston	29	E-HB-K	12	0	190	6–0	6	Georgia
77	Jim Weatherall	28	DT-T	12	0	245	6–4	2	Oklahoma
86	Norm Willey	30	DE-G-E	12	0	224	6–2	7	Marshall Thundering Herd
32	Neil Worden	26	FB	12	0	198	5–10	3	Notre Dame
74	Frank Wydo	33	T-DT	12	0	225	6–4	10	Cornell
73	Sid Youngelman	26	DT-DE	12	0	257	6–3	2	Alabama
	35 Players; Team Average	26.4		12		217.1	6–1.2	3.2	

== Postseason ==
Head Coach Hugh Devore struggled during his two seasons in the City of Brotherly Love, compiling a mark of 7–16–1. The poor record led to Devore's firing on January 11, 1958. Despite adding assistants such as former New York Giants head coach Steve Owen.
