= 1957 Hamilton Tiger-Cats season =

Season of Canadian Football League team the Hamilton Tiger-Cats

- Head coach: Jim Trimble
- Home stadium: Civic Stadium

Results
- Record: 10–4
- Division place: 1st, East
- Playoffs: Won Grey Cup

The 1957 Hamilton Tiger-Cats finished in first place in the East Division with a 10–4 record and won the Grey Cup over the Winnipeg Blue Bombers. The Tiger-Cats played the Kitchener-Waterloo Dutchmen in the preseason, which would prove to be the last time they would play an Ontario Rugby Football Union team.

== Preseason ==
Week	Date	Opponent	Result	Record	Attendance
A	Aug 1	at Winnipeg Blue Bombers	W 21–0	1–0	11,200
B	Aug 7	vs. Toronto Argonauts	W 25–0	2–0	11,000
C	Aug 13	at Kitchener-Waterloo Dutchmen	T 15–15	2–0–1	6,000

== Regular season ==
=== Season standings ===
Interprovincial Rugby Football Union
Team	GP	W	L	T	PF	PA	Pts
Hamilton Tiger-Cats	14	10	4	0	250	189	20
Ottawa Rough Riders	14	8	6	0	326	237	16
Montreal Alouettes	14	6	8	0	287	301	12
Toronto Argonauts	14	4	10	0	274	410	8

=== Season schedule ===
Week	Date	Opponent	Result	Record	Attendance
1	Aug 20	at Ottawa Rough Riders	L 10–14	0–1	18,000
1	Aug 24	vs. Montreal Alouettes	W 14–12	1–1	17,000
2	Sept 2	vs. Toronto Argonauts	W 17–0	2–1	21,685
3	Sept 6	at Toronto Argonauts	W 20–9	3–1	23,194
4	Sept 14	vs. Ottawa Rough Riders	W 12–9	4–1	22,010
5	Sept 21	at Montreal Alouettes	L 15–20	4–2	22,984
6	Sept 28	vs. Montreal Alouettes	L 6–31	4–3	21,115
7	Oct 5	at Ottawa Rough Riders	W 26–0	5–3	17,240
8	Oct 12	vs. Toronto Argonauts	W 30–12	6–3	16,000
8	Oct 14	at Toronto Argonauts	W 33–24	7–3	18,604
9	Oct 19	vs. Montreal Alouettes	W 17–5	8–3	19,000
10	Oct 26	at Montreal Alouettes	W 31–18	9–3	23,000
11	Nov 2	at Ottawa Rough Riders	L 18–31	9–4	16,000
12	Nov 9	vs. Ottawa Rough Riders	W 18–8	10–4	18,000

== Playoffs ==
=== Schedule ===
Round	Date	Opponent	Result	Record	Attendance
IRFU Final #1	Nov 16	at Montreal Alouettes	W 17–10	1–0	19,609
IRFU Final #2	Nov 23	vs. Montreal Alouettes	W 39–1	2–0	17,600
Grey Cup	Nov 30	vs. Winnipeg Blue Bombers	W 32–7	3–0	27,313

==== Grey Cup ====
Teams	Q1	Q2	Q3	Q4	Final
Winnipeg Blue Bombers	0	0	7	0	7
Hamilton Tiger-Cats	12	7	7	6	32
