= 1957 Toronto Argonauts season =

CFL team season

- Head coach: Hamp Pool
- Home stadium: Varsity Stadium

Results
- Record: 4–10
- Division place: 4th, IRFU
- Playoffs: did not qualify

The 1957 Toronto Argonauts finished in fourth place in the Interprovincial Rugby Football Union with a 4–10 record and failed to make the playoffs.

== Regular season ==
=== Standings ===
Interprovincial Rugby Football Union
Team	GP	W	L	T	PF	PA	Pts
Hamilton Tiger-Cats	14	10	4	0	250	189	20
Ottawa Rough Riders	14	8	6	0	326	237	16
Montreal Alouettes	14	6	8	0	287	301	12
Toronto Argonauts	14	4	10	0	274	410	8

=== Schedule ===
Week	Game	Date	Opponent	Results		Venue	Attendance
Week	Game	Date	Opponent	Score	Record	Venue	Attendance
1	1	Aug 20	at Montreal Alouettes	L 28–29	0–1	Molson Stadium	21,632
1	2	Aug 23	vs. Ottawa Rough Riders	L 17–22	0–2	Varsity Stadium	21,556
2	3	Sept 2	at Hamilton Tiger-Cats	L 8–35	0–3	Civic Stadium	21,665
3	4	Sept 6	vs. Hamilton Tiger-Cats	L 9–20	0–4	Varsity Stadium	23,194
4	5	Sept 14	at Montreal Alouettes	L 1–43	0–5	Molson Stadium	22,712
5	6	Sept 21	vs. Ottawa Rough Riders	L 14–55	0–6	Varsity Stadium	15,845
6	7	Sept 28	at Ottawa Rough Riders	L 21–40	0–7	Landsdowne Park	16,506
7	8	Oct 5	vs. Montreal Alouettes	W 41–31	1–7	Varsity Stadium	14,802
8	9	Oct 12	at Hamilton Tiger-Cats	L 14–38	1–8	Civic Stadium	16,000
8	10	Oct 14	vs. Hamilton Tiger-Cats	L 16–22	1–9	Varsity Stadium	18,604
9	11	Oct 19	vs. Ottawa Rough Riders	W 31–23	2–9	Varsity Stadium	13,882
10	12	Oct 26	at Ottawa Rough Riders	L 7–25	2–10	Landsdowne Park	12,440
11	13	Nov 2	vs. Montreal Alouettes	W 40–27	3–10	Varsity Stadium	13,971
12	14	Nov 9	at Montreal Alouettes	W 27–0	4–10	Molson Stadium	20,315
