= 1957 Calgary Stampeders season =

Canadian football team season

- General manager: Jim Finks
- Head coach: Otis Douglas
- Home stadium: Mewata Stadium

Results
- Record: 6–10
- Division place: 3rd
- Playoffs: Lost W.I.F.U. Semi-Finals

The 1957 Calgary Stampeders finished in third place in the W.I.F.U. with a 6–10 record. They were defeated in the W.I.F.U. Semi-Finals by the Winnipeg Blue Bombers.

== Regular season ==
=== Season standings ===
Western Interprovincial Football Union
Team	GP	W	L	T	PF	PA	Pts
Edmonton Eskimos	16	14	2	0	475	142	28
Winnipeg Blue Bombers	16	12	4	0	406	300	24
Calgary Stampeders	16	6	10	0	221	413	12
BC Lions	16	4	11	1	284	369	9
Saskatchewan Roughriders	16	3	12	1	276	438	7

=== Season schedule ===
Week	Game	Date	Opponent	Results		Venue	Attendance
Week	Game	Date	Opponent	Score	Record	Venue	Attendance
	1	Mon, Aug 19	vs. BC Lions	W 8–1	1–0	Mewata Stadium	10,000
	2	Sat, Aug 24	vs. Edmonton Eskimos	W 10–6	2–0	Mewata Stadium	16,000
	3	Mon, Aug 26	at BC Lions	W 22–20	3–0	Empire Stadium	28,100
	4	Sat, Aug 31	vs. Saskatchewan Roughriders	W 26–22	4–0	Mewata Stadium	16,000
	5	Mon, Sept 9	at Edmonton Eskimos	L 2–22	4–1	Clarke Stadium	20,000
	6	Sat, Sept 14	vs. Winnipeg Blue Bombers	L 13–40	5–1	Mewata Stadium	16,000
	7	Mon, Sept 16	at Saskatchewan Roughriders	L 27–44	5–2	Taylor Field	11,500
	8	Sat, Sept 21	at Winnipeg Blue Bombers	L 7–30	5–3	Winnipeg Stadium	18,322
	9	Wed, Sept 25	vs. BC Lions	W 22–21	5–4	Mewata Stadium	11,000
	10	Sat, Oct 5	vs. Saskatchewan Roughriders	W 36–9	6–4	Mewata Stadium	9,500
	11	Mon, Oct 7	at BC Lions	L 1–27	6–5	Empire Stadium	16,928
	12	Sat, Oct 12	at Edmonton Eskimos	L 7–46	6–6	Clarke Stadium	17,000
	13	Mon, Oct 14	vs. Edmonton Eskimos	L 6–32	6–7	Mewata Stadium	14,000
	14	Sat, Oct 19	vs. Winnipeg Blue Bombers	L 7–31	6–8	Mewata Stadium	10,000
	15	Sat, Oct 26	vs. Saskatchewan Roughriders	L 14–32	6–9	Taylor Field	8,500
	16	Mon, Oct 28	at Winnipeg Blue Bombers	L 13–30	6–10	Winnipeg Stadium	12,855

d

== Playoffs ==
WIFU Semi-Finals

November 9	Calgary Stampeders 13	Winnipeg Blue Bombers 13

November 11	Winnipeg Blue Bombers 15	Calgary Stampeders 3

- Winnipeg won the total-point series by 28–16. The Blue Bombers will play the Edmonton Eskimos in the WIFU Finals.

== Awards and records ==
- None
