= 1957 Chicago Cardinals season =

American football team season

- Owner: Violet Bidwill Wolfner
- Head coach: Ray Richards
- Home stadium: Comiskey Park

Results
- Record: 3–9
- Division place: 6th NFL Eastern
- Playoffs: Did not qualify

The 1957 Chicago Cardinals season marked the team's 38th year in the National Football League (NFL). The Cardinals failed to improve on their previous year's record of 7–5, winning only three games. They thus failed to qualify for the playoffs (NFL title game) for the ninth consecutive season.

== Season summary ==
After starting the season with an impressive 20–10 road win against the San Francisco 49ers, the 1957 Chicago Cardinals went into a funk, dropping 8 of the next 9 games, steadily sinking into irrelevancy. The team finished the year with a record of 3 wins and 9 losses — tied with the Green Bay Packers for the worst record in the 12-team league. The team gained a total of 3,217 yards in the 1957 campaign, again the second worst in the NFL. The team was slightly pass-driven for the era, gaining 1,775 yards in the air to just 1,442 on the ground, both of which marks were under the league average.

Defensively, the team allowed 4,108 yards in 1957, marred by the second-lowest rate of interception in the league and a net of −1 fumble recoveries.

The team's biggest star was powerful running back Ollie Matson, a future Pro Football Hall-of-Famer. Matson finished the 1957 season with 577 yards gained, sixth best in the league, with his season's best a 56-yard touchdown gallop. The passing offense was driven by quarterback Lamar McHan, who ended the season the league's 5th ranked QB, with 1,568 yards gained and 10 touchdown passes. His top target was end Gern Nagler, who grabbed 27 balls for 398 yards and 4 touchdowns — including one catch for 83 yards.

The team drew comparatively poorly, with only 2 of 6 home games topping the 20,000 mark at the gate. After just two more years they would abandon Chicago for a new city, becoming the St. Louis Cardinals in 1960.

== Schedule ==
Game	Date	Opponent	Result	Record	Venue	Attendance	Recap	Sources
1	September 29	at San Francisco 49ers	**W** 20–10	1–0	Kezar Stadium	35,743	Recap	
2	October 6	**Washington Redskins**	**L** 14–37	1–1	Comiskey Park	18,278	Recap	
3	October 13	at **Pittsburgh Steelers**	**L** 20–29	1–2	Forbes Field	29,446	Recap	
4	October 20	at **Washington Redskins**	**W** 44–14	2–2	Griffith Stadium	23,159	Recap	
5	October 27	**Cleveland Browns**	**L** 7–17	2–3	Comiskey Park	26,341	Recap	
6	November 3	**Philadelphia Eagles**	**L** 21–38	2–4	Comiskey Park	18,718	Recap	
7	November 10	at **New York Giants**	**L** 14–27	2–5	Yankee Stadium	46,402	Recap	
8	November 24	**New York Giants**	**L** 21–28	2–6	Comiskey Park	19,200	Recap	
9	December 1	at **Cleveland Browns**	**L** 0–31	2–7	Cleveland Municipal Stadium	40,525	Recap	
10	December 8	Chicago Bears	**L** 6–14	2–8	Comiskey Park	43,735	Recap	
11	December 14	at **Philadelphia Eagles**	**W** 31–27	3–8	Connie Mack Stadium	12,555	Recap	
12	December 22	**Pittsburgh Steelers**	**L** 2–27	3–9	Comiskey Park	10,084	Recap	
Note: Intra-conference opponents are in **bold** text.

dcccccc

== Summaries ==
=== Game 1: at San Francisco 49ers ===
After having dropped 5 of 6 preseason contests, the Chicago Cardinals came out swinging, pulling off a surprising non-conference upset win on the road against the San Francisco 49ers. A conservative bend-but-don't-break style defense was used by the Cardinals, who chose to gave up yardage on the ground in order to be "protected against the 'home run' type of play the Bay Area club used to compile a 5–1 exhibition record.

=== Game 2: Washington Redskins ===
The magical start to the 1957 season came to a screeching halt with an embarrassing second half collapse against the Washington Redskins at Comisky Park. Washington piled up nearly 250 yards on the ground and scored 24 unanswered points after halftime in their decisive win, with quarterback Eddie LeBaron and his mates adding 180 yards in the air against the shell-shocked Chicago defense.

=== Game 3: at Pittsburgh Steelers ===
An unexpectedly large crowd of 29,446 turned up to see the visiting Cardinals lose once again to Rooney U. in Pittsburgh — a tale of woe dating to their last victory in the Steel City in 1948. The game turned in the second quarter when the Cards attempted a 54-yard field goal off the toe of Pat Summerall, only to have it blocked by Pittsburgh middle guard Dale Dodrill and run back for a score by defensive end Huck O'Neil. Cardinal star Ollie Matson had a bad day at the office, gaining just 12 yards on 9 rushing attempts.

=== Game 4: at Washington Redskins ===
The Cardinals moved to a record of 2–2 with a victory at Washington's Griffith Field. Card quarterback Lamar McHan was the star, passing for three touchdowns and running for another as Chicago took a 31–7 lead to halftime in a game that was never close. Powerful back Ollie Matson added 155 yards on the ground on just 13 carries — one of his two touchdown runs being a 56-yarder. The visiting Cardinals neatly avenged their second half collapse leading to a Week 2 drubbing by Eddie LaBaron and the Skins.

=== Game 5: Cleveland Browns ===
In a dull game pairing ineffectual running attacks, Paul Brown and Cleveland overcame a 7–3 halftime deficit to beat Chicago. With the Cards down 10–7 in the fourth quarter and seemingly on the way to paydirt, a 15-yard holding penalty stalled their drive. Rookie quarterback Ted Marchibroda debuted for the Cards in the 4th but his first pass was a pick just outside his own red zone. While Chicago dodged that bullet, the Browns later drove the ball down the field and scored hen reserve QB Tommy O'Connell hit split end Preston Carpenter on a 14-yard crossing route for the final 17–7 margin.

=== Game 6: Philadelphia Eagles ===
As the 1957 season reached its midway point, the Cardinals' hopes began to wilt with a crushing 38–21 loss to the visiting Philadelphia Eagles. Quarterback Lamar McHan and halfback Ollie Matson had a productive day for Chicago, combining for 281 passing yards, with Matson scoring two touchdowns on the ground. However, a 6-to-3 turnover deficit proved to be an insurmountable obstacle for the Cards, who fell to 2–4 on the season. Five of the combined eight touchdowns scored as well as an Eagles field goal were set up by turnovers.

== Standings ==
NFL Eastern Conference
	W	L	T	PCT	CONF	PF	PA	STK
Cleveland Browns	9	2	1	.818	8–1–1	269	172	W1
New York Giants	7	5	0	.583	6–4	254	211	L3
Pittsburgh Steelers	6	6	0	.500	5–5	161	178	W1
Washington Redskins	5	6	1	.455	4–5–1	251	230	W3
Philadelphia Eagles	4	8	0	.333	4–6	173	230	L2
Chicago Cardinals	3	9	0	.250	2–8	200	299	L1

Note: Tie games were not officially counted in the standings until 1972.

== Personnel ==
=== Staff / Coaches ===
1957 Chicago Cardinals staff
Front office: Principal Owner - Violet Bidwill Wolfner; Managing Director - Walter Wolfner; Head coaches: Head Coach – Ray Richards; Assistant Coach - Charley Trippi; Offensive coaches: Ends Coach - Bob Nowaskey	Defensive coaches: Defensive Line Coach - Chuck Drulis; Defensive Backfield Coach - Tom Keane

=== Roster ===
Official team photo of the 1957 Chicago Cardinals.

Quarterbacks
• 12 - Paul Larson
• 7 - Ted Marchibroda
• 8 - Lamar McHan

Halfbacks
• 49 - Frank Bernardi
• 35 - Joe Childress
• 33 - Ollie Matson †
• 21 - Jimmy Sears

Fullbacks
• 31 - Mal Hammack
• 36 - Johnny Olszewski

Ends
• 83 - Max Boydston
• 20 - Woodley Lewis
• 86 - Gern Nagler

Tackles
• 65 - Jack Jennings
• 73 - Dave Lunceford

Guards
• 64 - Doug Hogland
• 67 - Bob Konovsky

Centers
• 50 - Earl Putman
• 55 - Stan West

Punter (and Halfback)
• 44 - Dave Mann

Kicker (and Defensive end)
• 85 - Pat Summerall

Defensive ends
• 87 - Dick Brubaker
• 84 - Leo Sugar

Defensive tackles
• 78 - Wayne Bock
• 76 - Tom Finnin
• 75 - Tony Pasquesi
• 74 - Len Teeuws
• 65 - Charlie Toogood
• 72 - Chuck Ulrich

Linebackers
• 57 - Carl Brettschneider
• 66 - Ed Husmann
• 51 - Leo Sanford
• 55 - Jim Taylor
• 53 - Jerry Tubbs
• 89 - Chuck Weber

Defensive backs
• 24 - Jimmy Carr
• 40 - Lindon Crow
• 41 - Jimmy Hill
• 81 - Dick "Night Train" Lane †
• 88 - Floyd Sagely

Notes: 1. Some players played multiple positions. 2. †-Denotes member of the Professional Football Hall of Fame.
Sources: Bob Carroll, et al., Total Football II: The Official Encyclopedia of the National Football League. New York: HarperCollins, 1999; p. 1571 and Pro Football Reference.
