= Gene Cockrell =

American football player (1934–2020)

No. 67, 70
- Positions: Offensive tackle, defensive end

Personal information
- Born: June 10, 1934; Pampa, Texas, U.S.
- Died: May 16, 2020 (aged 85); Decatur, Texas, U.S.
- Listed height: 6 ft 4 in (1.93 m)
- Listed weight: 247 lb (112 kg)

Career information
- High school: Pampa
- College: Hardin–Simmons
- NFL draft: 1957: 28th round, 330th overall pick

Career history
- Saskatchewan Roughriders (1957); New York Titans (1960–1962)

Awards and highlights
- National champion (1955)

Career AFL statistics
- Games played: 42
- Games started: 40
- Stats at Pro Football Reference

Eugene Oliver Cockrell (June 10, 1934 – May 16, 2020) was an American professional football offensive tackle who played three seasons with the New York Titans of the American Football League (AFL). He was drafted by the Cleveland Browns of the National Football League (NFL) in the 28th round of the 1957 NFL draft. He played college football at Oklahoma and Hardin–Simmons. He was also a member of the Saskatchewan Roughriders of the Western Interprovincial Football Union (WIFU).

== Early life and college ==
Cockrell attended Pampa High School in Pampa, Texas.

He first played college football for the Oklahoma Sooners of the University of Oklahoma. He left the University due to his job as a professional on the rodeo circuit. He re-enrolled in school to play for the Hardin–Simmons Cowboys of Hardin–Simmons University after concluding, with the help of Sammy Baugh, that he should return to college.

== Professional career ==
Cockrell was selected by the Cleveland Browns of the NFL in the 28th round with the 330th overall pick in the 1957 NFL draft. He played in twelve games for the WIFU's Saskatchewan Roughriders in 1957. He played for the New York Titans of the AFL from 1960 to 1962.

== Later life ==
Cockrell was inducted into the Texas Panhandle Sports Hall of Fame in 2010. He died on May 16, 2020, in Decatur, Texas at age 85.
