= Gern Nagler =

American football player (1932–2020)

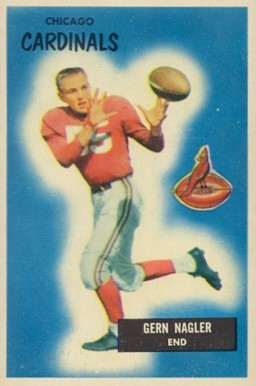
- Nagler on a 1955 Bowman football card

No. 84, 86
- Position: End

Personal information
- Born: February 23, 1932; Marysville, California, U.S.
- Died: April 9, 2020 (aged 88); Palm Desert, California, U.S.
- Listed height: 6 ft 2 in (1.88 m)
- Listed weight: 190 lb (86 kg)

Career information
- High school: Marysville
- College: Santa Clara (1949–1952)
- NFL draft: 1953: 14th round, 168th overall pick

Career history
- Baltimore Colts (1953)*; Chicago Cardinals (1953–1958); Pittsburgh Steelers (1959); Cleveland Browns (1960–1961); Dallas Cowboys (1962)*
- * Offseason or practice squad member only

Awards and highlights
- Pro Bowl (1958); Second-team All-PCC (1951)

Career NFL statistics
- Receptions: 196
- Receiving yards: 3,119
- Receiving touchdowns: 28
- Stats at Pro Football Reference

Robert Gern Nagler (/ˈneɪɡlər/ NAY-glər; February 23, 1932 – April 9, 2020) was an American professional football player who was an end for eight seasons in the National Football League (NFL). He played college football for the Santa Clara Broncos.

== Early life ==
Nagler was born in Marysville, California and raised in nearby Arboga He attended Marysville High School (class of 1949), where he was an all-league selection in football his junior and senior years. He attended the University of Santa Clara (class of 1953), majoring in history, and was a captain of the varsity football team in his senior year.

== NFL career ==
Nagler was selected 168th overall in the 14th round of the 1953 NFL draft by the Cleveland Browns. Prior to the season starting, the Browns completed a fifteen-player trade—which set the NFL record for the largest trade ever executed—that sent Nagler and nine other players to the Baltimore Colts. The Colts then waived him prior to the start of the 1953 NFL season. He was claimed off waivers by the Chicago Cardinals. In his rookie season, Nagler set the Cardinals team record for receptions in a rookie season, with 43.

Nagler missed the 1954 NFL season due to service in the United States Army. While posted at Fort Sill, Oklahoma, lieutenant Nagler helped coach the base football team to a perfect 12-0 record and the All-Service Championship, winning the 1954 Poinsettia Bowl.

He returned to the Cardinals in 1955, spending the next four seasons with the club. Nagler earned a Pro Bowl selection in 1958.

Following his Pro Bowl year, Nagler was traded to the Pittsburgh Steelers and spent one season with the team. He was moved to the Cleveland Browns as part of a four-player New Year's Eve trade that included Steelers quarterback Len Dawson. Nagler finished his playing career after the 1961 NFL season, after two seasons with the Browns.

Nagler was involved with the early efforts to organize a players' union, and was a key figure in the creation of the first players' pension. Nagler and Cleveland Browns end Billy Howton presented NFL Commissioner Bert Bell with a draft antitrust lawsuit, threatening to file if the NFL did not immediately establish a pension for its players. The gambit worked, and the pension was formally established three years later.

== NFL career statistics ==
Legend
	Led the league
**Bold**	Career high

Year	Team	Games		Receiving				
Year	Team	GP	GS	Rec	Yds	Avg	Lng	TD
1953	CRD	11	11	**43**	610	14.2	41	**6**
1955	CRD	11	5	7	218	**31.1**	74	3
1956	CRD	8	7	14	268	19.1	49	4
1957	CRD	12	12	27	475	17.6	**83**	4
1958	CRD	12	11	36	469	13.0	47	5
1959	PIT	12	5	14	222	15.9	35	2
1960	CLE	12	11	36	**616**	17.1	53	3
1961	CLE	13	13	19	241	12.7	21	1
		91	75	196	3,119	15.9	83	28

== Personal life and death ==
Following retirement from the NFL, Nagler worked in various aspects of the farming and agriculture industry, splitting time between southern California and the Hillsboro, Oregon area. Nagler was married three times, to Diana Swift (divorced 1975), Barbara Bertolini (1976-1995), and Jan Anacker (1998-2020). He and Diana had three children together.

He was inducted into the Santa Clara Hall of Fame in 1987 and the Marysville High School Hall of Fame in 2019.

Nagler died in his home in Palm Desert, California on April 9, 2020.
