= Vic Kristopaitis =

American gridiron football player (1935–2020)

Profile
- Positions: Guard, Linebacker, Kicker

Personal information
- Born: September 16, 1935; Swissvale, Pennsylvania, U.S.
- Died: January 24, 2020 (aged 84); Vancouver, British Columbia, Canada
- Listed height: 6 ft 0 in (1.83 m)
- Listed weight: 220 lb (100 kg)

Career information
- College: Dayton
- NFL draft: 1957: 16th round, 188th overall pick

Career history
- 1957–1958: Toronto Argonauts
- 1959–1962: BC Lions

Victor Kristopaitis (September 16, 1935 – January 24, 2020) was an American professional Canadian football player who played for the BC Lions and Toronto Argonauts. He previously played at the University of Dayton.
