= 1957 Cleveland Browns season =

1957 Cleveland Browns football season

- Head coach: Paul Brown
- Home stadium: Cleveland Stadium

Results
- Record: 9–2–1
- Division place: 1st NFL Eastern
- Playoffs: Lost NFL Championship (at Lions) 14–59
- Pro Bowlers: Ray Renfro, FL; Tommy O'Connell, QB; Don Paul, CB; Walt Michaels, LB; Bob Gain, OL; Mike McCormack, RT; Lou Groza, LT/K; Jim Brown, FB

The 1957 Cleveland Browns season was the team's eighth season with the National Football League. They were 9–2–1 in the regular season and won the Eastern Conference title, but lost the championship game to the Detroit Lions, 59–14.

== Season summary ==
The Browns missed the playoffs the previous season, ending ten straight years of league championship game appearances. The Browns came storming back in 1957 to finish 9–2–1 and win the Eastern Conference title by a relatively healthy margin over the defending world champion New York Giants (7–5). The Browns took care of business against the Giants, "bookending," as it were, their arch rivals. They beat New York 6–3 in the season opener and then edged them again 34–28 in the finale. The Browns also posted two shutouts on the year, 24–0 over the Pittsburgh Steelers and 31–0 over the Chicago Cardinals.

The Eastern foe the Browns had the most trouble with was fourth-place Washington (5–6–1). Cleveland edged the Redskins 21–17 and then had to settle for a 30–30 tie in the rematch. The Browns fell to Detroit 20–7, making them 0–3 against the Lions in the regular season since joining the NFL in 1950.

Although they had a rookie All-American running back out of Syracuse by the name of Jim Brown, the Browns were by no means an offensive juggernaut overall. The future Hall of Famer was outstanding, rushing for 942 yards and nine TDs, but he was the only real standout that year. Tommy O'Connell, who had taken over for retired Hall of Famer Otto Graham in 1956 and was the quarterback during the 5–7 finish that year, had the job for most of the way in 1957 as well. He and rookie Milt Plum combined for just 1,873 yards passing 12 touchdowns with 14 interceptions.

== Schedule ==
=== Exhibition ===
Week	Date	Opponent	Result	Record	Venue	Attendance
1	August 14	at Detroit Lions	**L** 10–20	0–1	Briggs Stadium	40,150
2	August 24	vs. Pittsburgh Steelers	**W** 28–13	1–1	Rubber Bowl	26,669
3	September 1	at San Francisco 49ers	**L** 17–21	1–2	Kezar Stadium	32,840
4	September 6	at Los Angeles Rams	**L** 14–20	1–3	Los Angeles Memorial Coliseum	45,011
5	September 14	Detroit Lions	**W** 23–7	2–3	Cleveland Municipal Stadium	34,369
6	September 20	at Chicago Bears	**L** 3–29	2–4	Wrigley Field	47,354

=== Regular season ===
Week	Date	Opponent	Result	Record	Venue	Attendance
1	September 29	**New York Giants**	**W** 6–3	1–0	Cleveland Municipal Stadium	58,095
2	October 5	at **Pittsburgh Steelers**	**W** 23–12	2–0	Forbes Field	35,570
3	October 13	**Philadelphia Eagles**	**W** 24–7	3–0	Cleveland Municipal Stadium	53,493
4	October 20	at **Philadelphia Eagles**	**L** 7–17	3–1	Connie Mack Stadium	22,443
5	October 27	at **Chicago Cardinals**	**W** 17–7	4–1	Comiskey Park	26,341
6	November 3	**Washington Redskins**	**W** 21–17	5–1	Cleveland Municipal Stadium	52,936
7	November 10	**Pittsburgh Steelers**	**W** 24–0	6–1	Cleveland Municipal Stadium	53,709
8	November 17	at **Washington Redskins**	**T** 30–30	6–1–1	Griffith Stadium	27,722
9	November 24	Los Angeles Rams	**W** 45–31	7–1–1	Cleveland Municipal Stadium	65,407
10	December 1	**Chicago Cardinals**	**W** 31–0	8–1–1	Cleveland Municipal Stadium	40,525
11	December 8	at Detroit Lions	**L** 7–20	8–2–1	Briggs Stadium	55,814
12	December 15	at **New York Giants**	**W** 34–28	9–2–1	Yankee Stadium	54,294

Note: Intra-division opponents are in bold text.

== Standings ==
NFL Eastern Conference
	W	L	T	PCT	CONF	PF	PA	STK
Cleveland Browns	9	2	1	.818	8–1–1	269	172	W1
New York Giants	7	5	0	.583	6–4	254	211	L3
Pittsburgh Steelers	6	6	0	.500	5–5	161	178	W1
Washington Redskins	5	6	1	.455	4–5–1	251	230	W3
Philadelphia Eagles	4	8	0	.333	4–6	173	230	L2
Chicago Cardinals	3	9	0	.250	2–8	200	299	L1

Note: Tie games were not officially counted in the standings until 1972.

== Postseason ==
Round	Date	Opponent	Result	Record	Venue	Attendance	Recap
Championship	December 29	at Detroit Lions	L 14–59	0–1	Briggs Stadium	55,263	Recap

=== NFL Championship Game ===
- Detroit Lions 59, Cleveland Browns 14

	1	2	3	4	Total
Browns	0	7	7	0	14
Lions	17	14	14	14	59

Scoring

- DET – FG Martin 31
- DET – Rote 1-yard run (Martin kick)
- DET – Gedman 1-yard run (Martin kick)
- CLE – Brown 29-yard run (Groza kick)
- DET – Junker 26-yard pass from Rote (Martin kick)
- DET – Barr 19-yard interception (Martin kick)
- CLE – Carpenter 5-yard run (Groza kick)
- DET – Doran 78-yard pass from Rote (Martin kick)
- DET – Junker 23-yard pass from Rote (Martin kick)
- DET – Middleton 32-yard pass from Rote (Martin kick)
- DET Cassady-yard pass from Reichow (Martin kick)

== Awards and records ==
- Jim Brown, NFL rushing leader, 942 yards
- Tommy O’Connell, NFL leader, passing yards, (1,229)

=== Milestones ===
- Jim Brown, First Rushing Title

== Roster ==
1957 Cleveland Browns roster
Quarterbacks: 10 John Borton; 15 Tommy O'Connell; 16 Milt Plum; Running backs: 32 Jim Brown; 48 Milt Campbell; 30 Lew Carpenter; 44 Chet Hanulak; 36 Ed Modzelewski; 26 Ray Renfro; 46 Billy Reynolds; Receivers: 88 Pete Brewster; 40 Preston Carpenter; 82 Frank Clarke	Offensive linemen: 52 Joe Amstutz C; 62 Herschel Forester G; 76 Lou Groza T/K; 56 Art Hunter C/T; 74 Mike McCormack T; 63 Fred Robinson G; 64 Jim Ray Smith G; Defensive linemen: 70 Don Colo DT; 80 Len Ford DE; 79 Bob Gain DT; 72 Henry Jordan DT; 84 Bill Quinlan DE; 86 Paul Wiggin DE	Linebackers: 65 Tom Catlin OLB; 50 Vince Costello MLB; 35 Galen Fiss OLB; 34 Walt Michaels OLB; Defensive backs: 18 Bobby Freeman S; 22 Ken Konz S/P; 24 Warren Lahr CB; 20 Don Paul CB; 42 Junior Wren S	Reserve list: 60 Harold Bradley G (IR); -- Willie Davis DE (Military); -- Bob Mischak G (Left squad); 65 Chuck Noll LB (IR); rookies in italics
