= Curry Juneau =

Canadian football player (born 1934)

Profile
- Positions: End, Guard

Personal information
- Born: August 3, 1934 (age 92); Kenner, Louisiana, U.S.
- Listed height: 6 ft 2 in (1.88 m)
- Listed weight: 220 lb (100 kg)

Career information
- High school: Redemptionist (LA)
- College: Southern Mississippi
- NFL draft: 1957: 21st round, 247th overall pick

Career history
- 1960: Montreal Alouettes
- 1960: Edmonton Eskimos
- 1961: Calgary Stampeders

Curry Juneau (born August 3, 1934) is an American former professional football player who played for the Edmonton Eskimos, Calgary Stampeders and Montreal Alouettes.

Juneau attended Mississippi Southern College and was selected in the 21st round of the 1957 NFL draft by the Cleveland Browns.

In 1964, Juneau was the coach of the Mobile Buccaneers of the Southern Professional Football League.
