= 1957 Washington Redskins season =

National Football League team season

- Owner: George Preston Marshall
- General manager: Dick McCann
- Head coach: Joe Kuharich
- Home stadium: Griffith Stadium

Results
- Record: 5–6–1
- Division place: 4th NFL Eastern
- Playoffs: Did not qualify

The 1957 Washington Redskins season was the franchise's 26th season in the National Football League (NFL) and their 21st in Washington, D.C. The team failed to improve on their 6–6 record from 1956 and finished 5–6–1.

From the 1955 season until 1962, the Redskins were the last bastion of racial segregation in the NFL, refusing to include a single black player on their roster, unlike the other 12 teams in the league.

== Offseason ==
=== NFL draft ===
Round	Pick	Player	Position	School/Club team

== Preseason ==
Week	Date	Opponent	Result	Record	Venue	Attendance
1	August 16	at Los Angeles Rams	L 14–45	0–1	Los Angeles Memorial Coliseum	85,871
2	August 25	at San Francisco 49ers	L 20–27	0–2	Kezar Stadium	24,781
3	August 31	vs. Detroit Lions	L 14–31	0–3	Legion Field (Birmingham, AL)	15,000
4	September 8	at Baltimore Colts	W 24–14	1–3	Baltimore Memorial Stadium	24,352
5	September 14	vs. Green Bay Packers	L 17–20	1–4	Bowman Gray Stadium (Winston-Salem, NC)	15,000
6	September 19	vs. Los Angeles Rams	L 3–14	1–5	Ladd Memorial Stadium (Mobile, AL)	10,217

== Regular season ==
=== Schedule ===
Game	Date	Opponent	Result	Record	Venue	Attendance	Recap	Sources
1	September 29	at **Pittsburgh Steelers**	**L** 7–28	0–1	Forbes Field	27,452	Recap	
2	October 6	at **Chicago Cardinals**	**W** 37–14	1–1	Comiskey Park	18,278	Recap	
3	October 13	**New York Giants**	**L** 20–24	1–2	Griffith Stadium	39,086	Recap	
4	October 20	**Chicago Cardinals**	**L** 14–44	1–3	Griffith Stadium	23,159	Recap	
5	October 27	at **New York Giants**	**W** 31–14	2–3	Yankee Stadium	40,416	Recap	
6	November 3	at **Cleveland Browns**	**L** 17–21	2–4	Cleveland Municipal Stadium	52,936	Recap	
7	November 10	Baltimore Colts	**L** 17–21	2–5	Griffith Stadium	33,149	Recap	
8	November 17	**Cleveland Browns**	**T** 30–30	2–5–1	Griffith Stadium	27,722	Recap	
9	November 24	at **Philadelphia Eagles**	**L** 12–21	2–6–1	Connie Mack Stadium	20,730	Recap	
10	December 1	at Chicago Bears	**W** 14–3	3–6–1	Wrigley Field	39,148	Recap	
11	December 8	**Philadelphia Eagles**	**W** 42–7	4–6–1	Griffith Stadium	21,304	Recap	
12	December 15	**Pittsburgh Steelers**	**W** 10–3	5–6–1	Griffith Stadium	22,577	Recap	
Note: Intra-conference opponents are in **bold** text.

=== Standings ===
NFL Eastern Conference
	W	L	T	PCT	CONF	PF	PA	STK
Cleveland Browns	9	2	1	.818	8–1–1	269	172	W1
New York Giants	7	5	0	.583	6–4	254	211	L3
Pittsburgh Steelers	6	6	0	.500	5–5	161	178	W1
Washington Redskins	5	6	1	.455	4–5–1	251	230	W3
Philadelphia Eagles	4	8	0	.333	4–6	173	230	L2
Chicago Cardinals	3	9	0	.250	2–8	200	299	L1

Note: Tie games were not officially counted in the standings until 1972.

== Personnel ==
=== Roster ===
1957 Washington Redskins roster
Quarterbacks (QB): 10 Rudy Bukich; 14 Eddie LeBaron; Running backs (RB): 31 Don Bosseler; 32 Leo Elter; 24 Jim Podoley; 25 Tom Runnels; 30 Ed Sutton; Wide receivers (WR): 82 Johnny Carson; 86 Steve Meilinger; Tight ends (TE)	Offensive linemen (OL): 52 Johnny Allen C; 62 Don Boll T; 70 Ray Lemek T; 51 Jim Schrader C; 60 Dick Stanfel G; 67 Red Stephens G; 66 Ed Voytek G; Defensive linemen (DL): 80 Gene Brito DE; 89 Bob Dee DE/DT; 87 Ed Khayat DE; 88 Chet Ostrowski DE; 72 Don Owens DT; 79 Volney Peters DT; 71 Will Renfro DT/DE/T	Linebackers (LB): 36 Chuck Drazenovich MLB; 45 Ralph Felton OLB; 54 Bill Fulcher OLB; 53 LaVern Torgeson OLB; Defensive backs (DB): 48 Norb Hecker S; 47 Dick James S/CB/RB; 28 Joe Scudero S/RB; 26 Don Shula CB; 81 Joe Walton CB/WR; 29 Bert Zagers CB/S; Special teams (ST): 49 Sam Baker K/P	Reserve: 84 Tom Braatz CB/S/LB/WR (IR); -- Ralph Guglielmi QB (Military); 76 J. D. Kimmel DT (IR); -- John Miller T/G (Military); -- John Paluck DE/DT (Military); Rookies in italics
