= Joe Kopnisky =

American football player and coach (1935–2014)

Biographical details
- Born: July 25, 1935; Etna, Pennsylvania, U.S.
- Died: June 19, 2014 (aged 78)

Playing career

Football
- 1954–1956: West Virginia
- Position: End

Coaching career (HC unless noted)

Football
- 1973–1983: Grove City

Wrestling
- 1965–1973: Grove City

Head coaching record
- Overall: 42–55–3 (football)

Joseph Louis Kopnisky (July 25, 1935 – June 19, 2014) was an American football player and coach. He served as the head football coach at Grove City College in Grove City, Pennsylvania from 1973 to 1983, compiling a record of 42–55–3.

Kopnisky played college football at West Virginia University from 1954 to 1956. He was drafted by the Chicago Cardinals in the 1957 NFL draft.

== Head coaching record ==
=== Football ===
Year	Team	Overall	Conference	Standing	Bowl/playoffs
Grove City Wolverines (NCAA Division III football independent) (1973–1983)
1973	Grove City	2–6–1			
1974	Grove City	5–3–1			
1975	Grove City	5–4			
1976	Grove City	6–3			
1977	Grove City	6–4			
1978	Grove City	4–4–1			
1979	Grove City	3–6			
1980	Grove City	4–5			
1981	Grove City	2–7			
1982	Grove City	2–7			
1983	Grove City	3–6			
Grove City:		42–55–3			
Total:		42–55–3			
