= Roy Wilkins (American football) =

American football player (1933–2002)

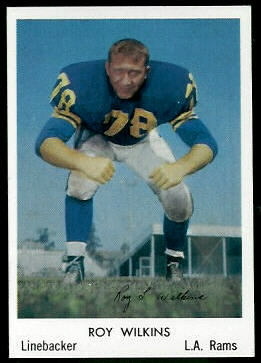
- Wilkins in 1959

No. 78, 35, 83
- Position: Linebacker

Personal information
- Born: December 26, 1933; Murray County, Georgia, U.S.
- Died: October 4, 2002 (aged 68)
- Listed height: 6 ft 3 in (1.91 m)
- Listed weight: 224 lb (102 kg)

Career information
- High school: Dalton (GA); Seneca (SC)
- College: Georgia
- NFL draft: 1957: 6th round, 64th overall pick

Career history
- Los Angeles Rams (1958–1959); Washington Redskins (1960–1961)

Career NFL statistics
- Fumble recoveries: 2
- Sacks: 0.5
- Stats at Pro Football Reference

Roy Lee Wilkins (December 26, 1933 – October 4, 2002) was an American professional football linebacker in the National Football League (NFL) for the Los Angeles Rams and the Washington Redskins.

He played college football at the University of Georgia and was drafted in the sixth round of the 1957 NFL draft.
