= Ken Russell (American football) =

American football player (1935–2014)

No. 73
- Position: Offensive tackle

Personal information
- Born: November 2, 1935; Fostoria, Ohio, U.S.
- Died: March 11, 2014 (aged 78); Walbridge, Ohio, U.S.
- Listed height: 6 ft 3 in (1.91 m)
- Listed weight: 252 lb (114 kg)

Career information
- High school: Fostoria
- College: Bowling Green (1953–1956)
- NFL draft: 1957: 6th round, 71st overall pick

Career history
- Detroit Lions (1957–1959)

Awards and highlights
- NFL champion (1957)

Career NFL statistics
- Games played: 26
- Games started: 13
- Stats at Pro Football Reference

Ken Russell (November 2, 1935 – March 11, 2014) was an American professional football tackle. He played for the Detroit Lions from 1957 to 1959.

He died on March 11, 2014, in Walbridge, Ohio at age 78.
