= Bill Priatko =

American football player (born 1931)

No. 64
- Position: Linebacker

Personal information
- Born: October 16, 1931 (age 95); North Braddock, Pennsylvania, U.S.
- Listed height: 6 ft 2 in (1.88 m)
- Listed weight: 220 lb (100 kg)

Career information
- High school: Scott (PA)
- College: Pittsburgh

Career history
- Pittsburgh Steelers (1957); Cleveland Browns (1959–1960)*
- * Offseason or practice squad member only
- Stats at Pro Football Reference

William Daniel Priatko (born October 16, 1931) is an American former football linebacker who played college football for Pittsburgh and professional football in the National Football League (NFL) for the Pittsburgh Steelers in 1957. He appeared in two NFL games.

== Early life ==
Priatko was born in 1931 in North Braddock, Pennsylvania, and attended North Braddock Scott High School.

From 1951 to 1953, he played college football as a tackle and guard for the Pittsburgh Panthers, though his collegiate career was plagued by injuries.

Priatko later served in the Air Force and played for the Bolling Air Force football team in 1956.

== Professional football ==
Priatko had been drafted by the Green Bay Packers after graduating from Pitt but his professional football career was postponed due to military service. He was signed by the Pittsburgh Steelers as a linebacker in December 1957. He appeared in the last two games of the 1957 season for the Steelers.

He tried out with the Cleveland Browns in both 1959 and 1960, but did not make the regular season roster. His playing career ended due to knee injuries.

== Later life ==
Priatko later worked for the athletic department at Robert Morris College. Priatko worked in the food and beverage department at Kennywood Park for numerous summers following his retirement. He often worked at the former Soda Fountain concession stand, serving burgers, and spreading positivity to Kennywood's employees and guests. Bill remains active, with a daily regimen of 150 push ups. He is also still heavily involved in the local football programs and has recently been invited by Art Rooney to celebrate the 50th anniversary of Franco Harris’ Immaculate Reception.
