= Tom Saidock =

American football player (1930–2014)

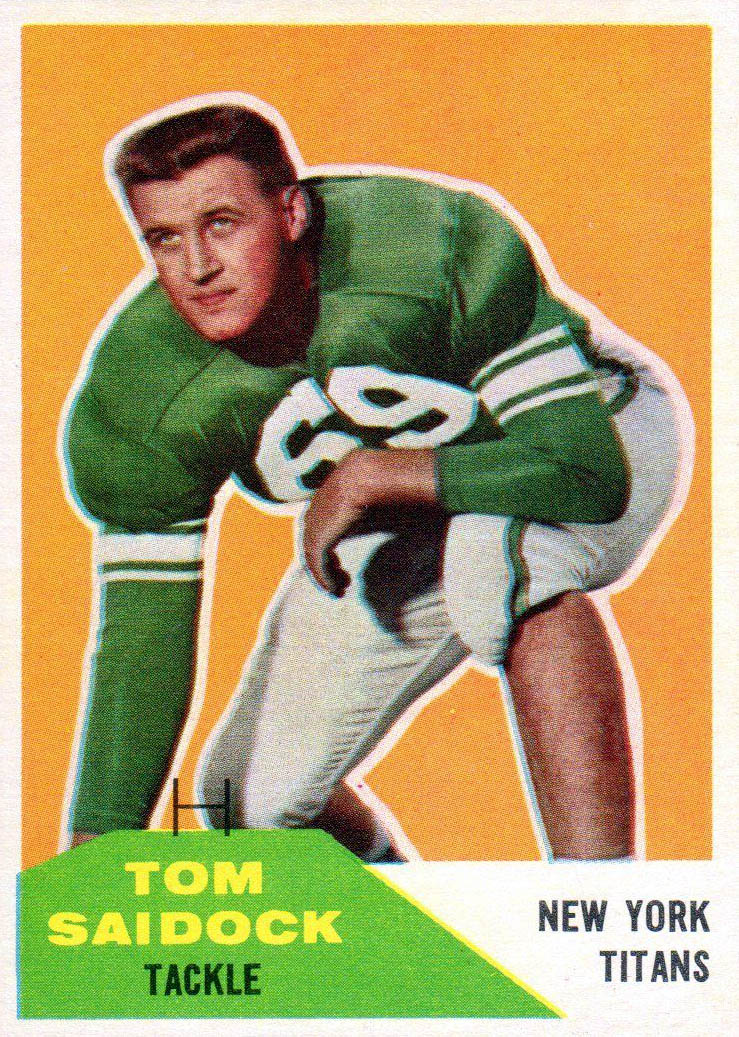

No. 75
- Position: Defensive tackle

Personal information
- Born: February 26, 1930; Detroit, Michigan, U.S.
- Died: September 7, 2014 (aged 84); Dearborn Heights, Michigan, U.S.
- Listed height: 6 ft 5 in (1.96 m)
- Listed weight: 261 lb (118 kg)

Career information
- High school: Fordson (Dearborn Heights)
- College: Michigan State (1955–1956)
- NFL draft: 1957: 7th round, 74th overall pick

Career history
- Philadelphia Eagles (1957); New York Titans (1960–1961); Buffalo Bills (1962)

Career NFL/AFL statistics
- Fumble recoveries: 4
- Sacks: 2
- Stats at Pro Football Reference

Thomas Saidock (February 26, 1930 – September 7, 2014) was an American professional football defensive lineman in the National Football League (NFL) for the Philadelphia Eagles, and in the American Football League (AFL) for the New York Titans and Buffalo Bills. Saidock played college football at Michigan State University and was selected in the seventh round of the 1957 NFL draft.

== See also ==
- Other American Football League players
