= Jerry Janes =

American gridiron football player (1935–2017)

No. 77
- Positions: End, Split end

Personal information
- Born: April 1, 1935; Mooringsport, Louisiana, U.S.
- Died: August 11, 2017 (aged 82); Surrey, British Columbia, Canada
- Listed height: 6 ft 5 in (1.96 m)
- Listed weight: 238 lb (108 kg)

Career information
- College: LSU
- NFL draft: 1957: 21st round, 252nd overall pick

Career history
- 1957–1959, 1963: BC Lions
- 1960: Calgary Stampeders
- 1960, 1963: Hamilton Tiger-Cats

Jerry C. Janes (April 1, 1935 – August 11, 2017) was an American professional football player who played for the BC Lions, Calgary Stampeders and Hamilton Tiger-Cats of the Canadian Football League (CFL). He played college football at Louisiana State University and was selected in the 1957 NFL draft by the Chicago Bears (Round 21, #252). He died in Surrey, British Columbia in 2017.
