= Ed Voytek =

American football player (1935–2016)

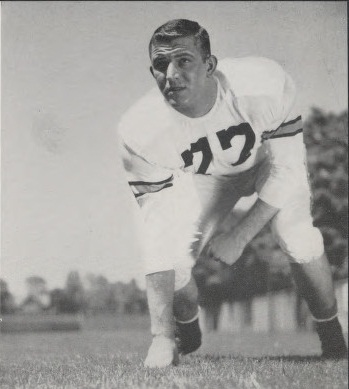
- Voytek from 1955 Purdue yearbook

No. 66
- Position: Guard

Personal information
- Born: April 4, 1935; Cleveland, Ohio, U.S.
- Died: January 16, 2016 (aged 80); Independence, Missouri, U.S.
- Listed height: 6 ft 2 in (1.88 m)
- Listed weight: 235 lb (107 kg)

Career information
- High school: Cathedral Latin (OH)
- College: Purdue
- NFL draft: 1957: 22nd round, 261st overall pick

Career history
- Washington Redskins (1957–1958)

Career NFL statistics
- Games played: 24
- Games started: 3
- Stats at Pro Football Reference

Edward Louis Voytek (April 4, 1935 – January 16, 2016) was a National Football League (NFL) guard for the Washington Redskins. He played college football at Purdue University and was drafted in the 22nd round of the 1957 NFL draft.

Voytek died on January 16, 2016, in Independence, Missouri.

== Early and personal life ==
Voytek was born on April 4, 1935, in Cleveland, Ohio to parents John and Helen Voytek. He graduated from Notre Dame-Cathedral Latin School, and then attended Purdue University, where he played football. After his playing career, he went back to Purdue in order to pursue further education and received his doctorate in veterinary medicine in 1962.

== Playing career ==
Voytek was drafted in 1957 by the Washington Redskins during the 22nd round. He wore No. 66, and appeared in 24 games during the 1957 and 1958 seasons.
