= Dick Young (gridiron football player) =

American gridiron football player (1930–2012)

No. 24, 31, 35, 16
- Positions: Fullback, halfback

Personal information
- Born: August 25, 1930; Trumbull, Connecticut, U.S.
- Died: March 31, 2012 (aged 81); Milford, Connecticut, U.S.
- Listed height: 5 ft 11 in (1.80 m)
- Listed weight: 210 lb (95 kg)

Career information
- High school: Trumbull
- College: Chattanooga (1951–1954)
- NFL draft: 1954: 18th round, 206th overall pick

Career history
- Baltimore Colts (1955–1956); Pittsburgh Steelers (1957); Hamilton Tiger-Cats (1960)

Career NFL statistics
- Rushing yards: 199
- Rushing average: 2.6
- Receptions: 6
- Receiving yards: 53
- Total touchdowns: 2
- Stats at Pro Football Reference

Richard A. Young (August 25, 1930 – March 31, 2012) was an American professional football fullback and halfback who played college football for Chattanooga and professional football in the National Football League (NFL) for the Baltimore Colts (1955–1956) and Pittsburgh Steelers (1957). He appeared in 34 NFL games, three of them as a starter. He also played for the Hamilton Tiger-Cats of the Canadian Football League (CFL) in 1960.

== Early life ==
Young was born in 1930 in Trumbull, Connecticut, and attended Trumbull High School. He then played college football at Chattanooga.

== Professional football ==
He was selected by the Chicago Cardinals in the 18th round (206th overall pick) in the 1954 NFL draft. He did not appear in any regular season games with the Cardinals. He spent the 1955 and 1956 seasons with the Baltimore Colts, appearing in 23 games, none as a starter. In 1957, he played for the Pittsburgh Steelers, appearing in 11 games and rushing for 153 yards on 56 carries. He concluded his playing career in the Canadian Football League (CFL) with the Hamilton Tiger-Cats in 1960. He appeared in three games for Hamilton.

== Later life ==
Young died in 2012 at age 81 in Milford, Connecticut.
