= Dean Derby =

American football player (1935–2021)

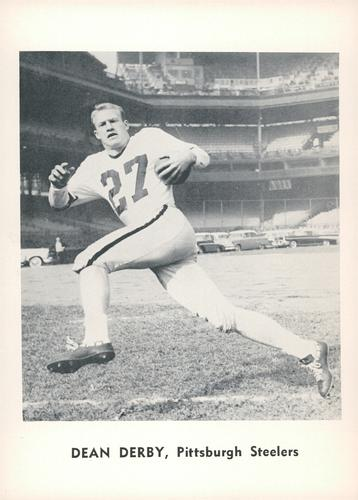
- Derby in 1961

No. 27, 25
- Position: Defensive back

Personal information
- Born: June 11, 1935; Leavenworth, Washington, U.S.
- Died: October 29, 2021 (aged 86); Walla Walla, Washington, U.S.
- Listed height: 6 ft 0 in (1.83 m)
- Listed weight: 185 lb (84 kg)

Career information
- High school: Walla Walla
- College: Washington (1953–1956)
- NFL draft: 1957: 5th round, 51st overall pick

Career history
- Los Angeles Rams (1957)*; Pittsburgh Steelers (1957–1961); Minnesota Vikings (1961-1962)
- * Offseason or practice squad member only

Awards and highlights
- Pro Bowl (1959); NFL interceptions co-leader (1959); First-team All-PCC (1956)

Career NFL statistics
- Interceptions: 21
- Fumble recoveries: 5
- Stats at Pro Football Reference

Clarence Dean Derby (June 11, 1935 – October 29, 2021) was an American professional football player who was a defensive back for six season in the National Football League (NFL). He played college football for the Washington Huskies. He played in the NFL for the Pittsburgh Steelers (1957–1961) and Minnesota Vikings (1961–1962).

Darby died on October 29, 2021, in Walla Walla, Washington, at age 86.
