= Henry Jordan =

American football player (1935–1977)

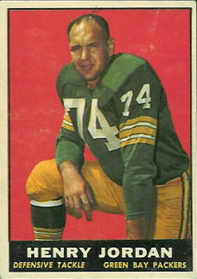
- 1961 card of Jordan

No. 72, 74
- Positions: Defensive tackle, defensive end

Personal information
- Born: January 26, 1935; Emporia, Virginia, U.S.
- Died: February 21, 1977 (aged 42); Milwaukee, Wisconsin, U.S.
- Listed height: 6 ft 2 in (1.88 m)
- Listed weight: 248 lb (112 kg)

Career information
- High school: Warwick (Newport News, Virginia)
- College: Virginia
- NFL draft: 1957: 5th round, 52nd overall pick

Career history
- Cleveland Browns (1957–1958); Green Bay Packers (1959–1969)

Awards and highlights
- 2× Super Bowl champion (I, II); 5× NFL champion (1961, 1962, 1965–1967); 5× First-team All-Pro (1960–1964); 2× Second-team All-Pro (1966, 1967); 4× Pro Bowl (1960, 1961, 1963, 1966); Green Bay Packers Hall of Fame

Career NFL statistics
- Fumble recoveries: 21
- Total touchdowns: 1
- Sacks: 59.5
- Stats at Pro Football Reference
- Pro Football Hall of Fame

Medal record

Collegiate Wrestling

Representing the Virginia Cavaliers

NCAA Division I Championships
Silver medal – second place	1957 Pittsburgh	Heavyweight

Henry Wendell Jordan (January 26, 1935 – February 21, 1977) was an American professional football player who was a defensive tackle for 13 seasons in the National Football League (NFL) with the Cleveland Browns and Green Bay Packers. He played college football for the Virginia Cavaliers and was selected in the fifth round of the 1957 NFL draft. He played in the NFL from 1957 to 1969 and is a member of the Pro Football Hall of Fame.

== Early life ==
Jordan was born on January 26, 1935, in Emporia, Virginia. He graduated in 1953 from Warwick High School, in Newport News. At Warwick, Jordan showed himself to be outstanding as a leader, as well as academically and in athletics, among other things. Jordan served multiple times as class president. He lettered in football, track and wrestling. He was a football co-captain, and was selected All-Tidewater, All-Eastern District, and honorable mention for All-State. In wrestling, as a junior he won the State AAU Heavyweight Wrestling Championship.

In 1985, a college scholarship fund to honor Jordan was created to assist a graduating Warwick senior in going to college. In 2008, the Henry Jordan Memorial Scholarship Fund formally was established with the Peninsula Community Foundation of Virginia to provide annual college scholarships to a Warwick senior.

== College ==
Jordan attend the University of Virginia (UVA), where he received a Bachelor of Science degree in commerce in 1957. He was a Dean's list student academically, vice-president of his graduating class, and honored as the Distinguished Military Student of 1957. He played college football, and was the captain of the football team as a senior, also being named All-State and All-Atlantic Coast Conference (ACC). Jordan was also an All-American wrestler in 1957 (UVA's first), the ACC champion in 1957 in the unlimited weight division, and National Collegiate Athletic Association (NCAA) runner-up at 1957 NCAA Wrestling championships. He was a member of the Beta chapter of Sigma Nu fraternity at UVA.

== Professional career ==
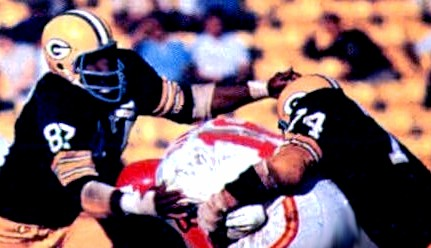
Jordan, (right) with Willie Davis (left), sacking Len Dawson in Super Bowl I.

Jordan was selected 52nd overall in the fifth round of the 1957 NFL draft by the Cleveland Browns. He played in every Browns game for two years (1957–58), but did not start any. After two years, the Browns traded him for a fourth round draft choice to the Green Bay Packers in Vince Lombardi's first season. He would go on to play for Green Bay from 1959 to 1969, as an integral part of five championship teams.

In 1959, Lombardi started Jordan in all 12 games at right defensive tackle. In 1960, he started at both defensive tackle positions, with 7.5 quarterback sacks and five fumble recoveries. He was selected first-team All-Pro by the Associated Press (AP) and United Press International (UPI). He also played in the 1960 Pro Bowl. The Packers reached the 1960 NFL Championship game, with Jordan starting at right defensive tackle, but lost to the Philadelphia Eagles. 17–13.

The 1961 Packers went on to win the NFL Championship game, defeating the New York Giants 37–0, Jordan again starting at right defensive tackle. In 1961, he had 8.5 sacks during the regular season, and was again named first-team All-Pro by the AP and UPI, as well as by the Newspaper Enterprise Association (NEA); and once again chosen to play in the Pro Bowl. The Packers won the NFL championship over the Giants again in 1962 with Jordan at right tackle. He had 8.5 sacks, an interception and a fumble recovery during the regular season, and was named first-team All Pro by the AP and second-team All Pro by the NEA and UPI.

Jordan was again selected to the Pro Bowl in 1963, and was named first-team All Pro by the AP, NEA and UPI. In 1964, he was named first-team All Pro by the AP and UPI. In 1966, Jordan was again selected to the Pro Bowl, and was named second-team All Pro by the AP, NEA and UPI. He had five, 6.5 and 7.5 sacks in 1965–1967, respectively.

With Jordan starting, the Packers won the NFL championship games again in 1965, 1966 (where Jordan had a sack), and 1967. They were victors in the first two Super Bowls, with Jordan starting: on January 15, 1967 where Jordan had 1.5 sacks, and January 14, 1968. In Super Bowl I against the Kansas City Chiefs, Jordan's hit on quarterback Len Dawson led to a key interception by the Packers Willie Wood.

Before getting to the 1967 NFL championship game and Super Bowl, the Packers defeated the Los Angeles Rams in the division playoff round, 28–7. The Rams were 11–1–2 that season and were favored in the game. Jordan had 3.5 sacks, playing against future Hall of Fame guard Tom Mack.

Jordan retired after the 1969 season, the result of injuries.

=== Career ===
Jordan was elected to four Pro Bowls (1960, 1961, 1963, and 1966), and he was the Pro Bowl MVP in 1961. Jordan was All-NFL six times, and he was a defensive leader on a Green Bay Packers team that won five of six NFL title games in eight seasons and won the first two Super Bowls.

Most notably among his quips is: “Lombardi treats us all the same, like dogs.”

== Honors ==
In 1974, Jordan was inducted into the Virginia Sports Hall of Fame. In 1975, he was inducted into the Green Bay Packers Hall of Fame.

In 1995, Henry Jordan was inducted posthumously into the Pro Football Hall of Fame.

He was represented in the coin toss ceremony at Super Bowl XXIX by former teammate Ray Nitschke, who was also named to the NFL's 75th Anniversary team. The ceremony brought together former NFL stars of the 1950s, 1960s, 1970s, and 1980s, with surviving members of that year's Hall of Fame class representing the latter decade (one of them, then-Congressman Steve Largent flipped the coin on their behalf).

In 2000, the Warwick High School athletics field was named in his honor.

In May 2009, he was named to the Hampton Roads Sports Hall of Fame, which honors athletes, coaches and administrators who contributed to sports in southeastern Virginia.

== Personal life ==
Jordan retired at age 35 in February 1970, after an injury-filled 1969 season. In 1970, Jordan relocated south to Milwaukee to create and oversee Summerfest. He was successful in business before his early death.

== Death ==
On February 21, 1977, seven years after leaving Green Bay, Jordan died at age 42 of a heart attack after jogging.
