= Don Vicic =

American gridiron football player (born 1935)

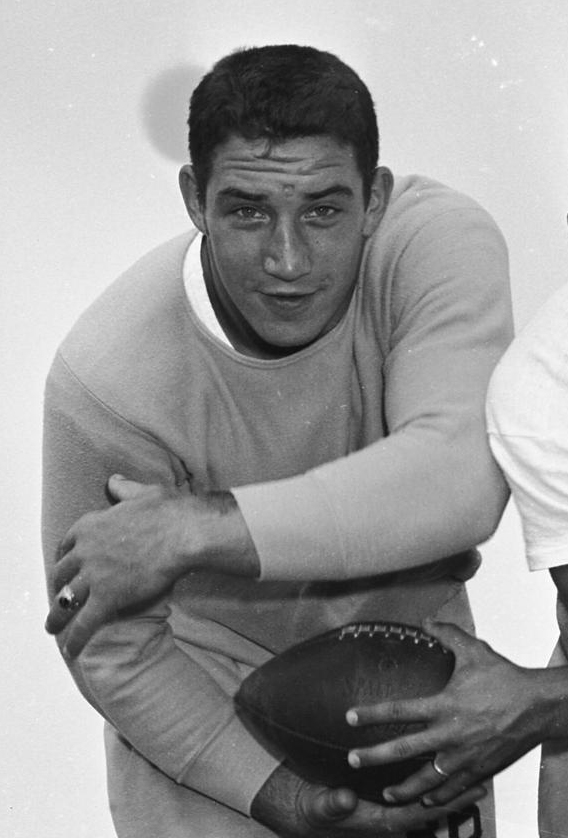
- Vicic in 1957

Profile
- Positions: Fullback, Linebacker

Personal information
- Born: January 3, 1935 (age 91); Euclid, Ohio, U.S.
- Listed height: 6 ft 2 in (1.88 m)
- Listed weight: 215 lb (98 kg)

Career information
- High school: Euclid
- College: Ohio State (1953–1956)
- NFL draft: 1957: 27th round, 320th overall pick

Career history
- 1957–1964: BC Lions

Awards and highlights
- Grey Cup champion (1964); National champion (1954)

Donald Joseph Vicic (born January 3, 1935) is an American former professional football player who played for the BC Lions. He won the Grey Cup with them in 1964. He played college football at Ohio State University. He was later an investment advisor and founded Brown & Vicic Limited. He is currently a vice-president and consultant to RBC Dominion Securities.

As of 2025, Vicic lives in West Vancouver and is the oldest living ex-BC Lions player.
