= 1957 New York Giants season =

1957 New York Giants football season

- Owner: Tim Mara
- Head coach: Jim Lee Howell
- Home stadium: Yankee Stadium

Results
- Record: 7–5
- Division place: 2nd NFL Eastern
- Playoffs: Did not qualify

The 1957 New York Giants season marked the franchise's 33rd year in the National Football League (NFL). The Giants came up short with a 7–5 record, and finished in second place behind the Cleveland Browns.

== Regular season ==
=== Schedule ===
| Game | Date | Opponent | Result | Record | Venue | Attendance | Recap | Sources |
|---|---|---|---|---|---|---|---|---|
| 1 | September 29 | at **Cleveland Browns** | **L** 3–6 | 0–1 | Cleveland Municipal Stadium | 58,095 | Recap | |
| 2 | October 5 | at **Philadelphia Eagles** | **W** 24–20 | 1–1 | Connie Mack Stadium | 28,342 | Recap | |
| 3 | October 13 | at **Washington Redskins** | **W** 24–20 | 2–1 | Griffith Stadium | 39,086 | Recap | |
| 4 | October 20 | **Pittsburgh Steelers** | **W** 35–0 | 3–1 | Yankee Stadium | 52,589 | Recap | |
| 5 | October 27 | **Washington Redskins** | **L** 14–31 | 3–2 | Yankee Stadium | 40,416 | Recap | |
| 6 | November 3 | at Green Bay Packers | **W** 31–17 | 4–2 | City Stadium | 32,070 | Recap | |
| 7 | November 10 | **Chicago Cardinals** | **W** 27–14 | 5–2 | Yankee Stadium | 46,402 | Recap | |
| 8 | November 17 | **Philadelphia Eagles** | **W** 13–0 | 6–2 | Yankee Stadium | 42,845 | Recap | |
| 9 | November 24 | at **Chicago Cardinals** | **W** 28–21 | 7–2 | Comiskey Park | 19,200 | Recap | |
| 10 | December 1 | San Francisco 49ers | **L** 17–27 | 7–3 | Yankee Stadium | 54,121 | Recap | |
| 11 | December 7 | at **Pittsburgh Steelers** | **L** 10–21 | 7–4 | Forbes Field | 19,772 | Recap | |
| 12 | December 15 | **Cleveland Browns** | **L** 28–34 | 7–5 | Yankee Stadium | 54,294 | Recap | |
Note: Intra-conference opponents are in **bold** text.

=== Standings ===
NFL Eastern Conference
| | W | L | T | PCT | CONF | PF | PA | STK |
|---|---|---|---|---|---|---|---|---|
| Cleveland Browns | 9 | 2 | 1 | .818 | 8–1–1 | 269 | 172 | W1 |
| New York Giants | 7 | 5 | 0 | .583 | 6–4 | 254 | 211 | L3 |
| Pittsburgh Steelers | 6 | 6 | 0 | .500 | 5–5 | 161 | 178 | W1 |
| Washington Redskins | 5 | 6 | 1 | .455 | 4–5–1 | 251 | 230 | W3 |
| Philadelphia Eagles | 4 | 8 | 0 | .333 | 4–6 | 173 | 230 | L2 |
| Chicago Cardinals | 3 | 9 | 0 | .250 | 2–8 | 200 | 299 | L1 |

Note: Tie games were not officially counted in the standings until 1972.

== Roster ==
1957 New York Giants roster
| Quarterbacks (QB): 12 Bob Clatterbuck; 42 Charlie Conerly; 11 Don Heinrich; Running backs (RB): 35 Bobby Epps; 40 Gene Filipski; 16 Frank Gifford; 33 Mel Triplett; 29 Alex Webster; Wide receivers (WR): 80 Ken MacAfee; 44 Kyle Rote; 85 Bob Schnelker; Tight ends (TE) | Offensive linemen (OL): 60 Bill Austin G; 61 Ray Beck G/MLB; 79 Rosey Brown T; 62 Jack Spinks G; 66 Jack Stroud G/T; 55 Ray Wietecha C; 72 Dick Yelvington T; Defensive linemen (DL): 75 Jim Katcavage DT; 83 John Martinkovic DE/DT; 77 Dick Modzelewski DT; 81 Andy Robustelli DE; 78 Walt Yowarsky DE/T | Linebackers (LB): 70 Sam Huff MLB; 89 Cliff Livingston OLB/DE; 84 Harland Svare OLB; 30 Bill Svoboda OLB; Defensive backs (DB): 22 Johnny Bookman CB; 21 Eddie Crawford S/WR; 48 Ed Hughes CB; 25 Dick Nolan CB; 20 Jimmy Patton S; 45 Emlen Tunnell S; Special teams (ST): 9 Ben Agajanian K; 34 Don Chandler P | Reserve: -- Rosey Grier DT (Military); Rookies in italics |

== See also ==
- List of New York Giants seasons
