= Ed Beatty =

American football player (1932–2008)

No. 54, 57, 56
- Positions: Center, linebacker

Personal information
- Born: April 6, 1932; Clarksdale, Mississippi, U.S.
- Died: June 7, 2008 (aged 76); Tiptonville, Tennessee, U.S.
- Listed height: 6 ft 3 in (1.91 m)
- Listed weight: 229 lb (104 kg)

Career information
- College: Ole Miss
- NFL draft: 1954: 1st round, 10th overall pick

Career history
- San Francisco 49ers (1955–1956); Pittsburgh Steelers (1957–1961); Washington Redskins (1961)

Career NFL statistics
- Games played: 80
- Games started: 53
- Fumble recoveries: 11
- Stats at Pro Football Reference

Edward Marshall Beatty Jr. (April 6, 1932 – June 7, 2008) was an American professional football center who played in the National Football League (NFL) for the Washington Redskins, the San Francisco 49ers, and the Pittsburgh Steelers. He played college football at the University of Mississippi and was drafted in the first round of the 1954 NFL draft by the Los Angeles Rams. Beatty was born in Clarksdale, Mississippi, practiced dentistry after his playing days were over and died in Tiptonville, Tennessee where he lived.
