= Bill Michael (guard) =

American football player (born 1935)

No. 64
- Position: Guard

Personal information
- Born: December 24, 1935 (age 90); Hamilton, Ohio, U.S.
- Listed height: 6 ft 2 in (1.88 m)
- Listed weight: 240 lb (109 kg)

Career information
- High school: Fairfield (Fairfield, Ohio)
- College: Ohio State
- NFL draft: 1957: 2nd round, 16th overall pick

Career history
- Pittsburgh Steelers (1957)

Awards and highlights
- National champion (1954)

Career NFL statistics
- Games played: 3
- Games started: 2
- Stats at Pro Football Reference

Paul William Michael (born December 24, 1935) is an American former professional football player who was a lineman for the Pittsburgh Steelers of the National Football League (NFL) in 1957. He played college football for the Ohio State Buckeyes. He appeared in three NFL games, two of them as a starter.

== Early life ==
Michael was born in 1935 in Hamilton, Ohio, and attended Fairfield High School in Fairfield, Ohio. He then played college football at Ohio State where he was a team captain and played tackle and end. After the 1956 season, he played in both the East-West Shrine game and the Senior Bowl.

== Professional football ==
He was selected by the Pittsburgh Steelers in the second round (16th overall pick) of the 1957 NFL draft. He appeared in three games with the Steelers during the 1957 season, two of them as a starter. Before the season started he was moved from defensive tackle to offensive guard. A few weeks into the season he suffered a career-ending fractured knee.
