= John Reger =

American football player (1931–2013)

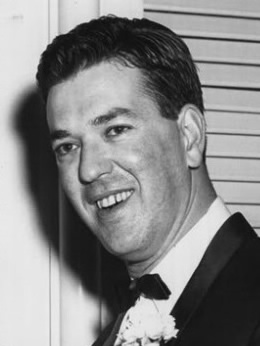

No. 50, 51
- Positions: Linebacker, guard

Personal information
- Born: September 11, 1931; Wheeling, West Virginia, U.S.
- Died: September 19, 2013 (aged 82); Tampa, Florida, U.S.
- Listed height: 6 ft 0 in (1.83 m)
- Listed weight: 225 lb (102 kg)

Career information
- High school: Linsly School (Wheeling)
- College: Pittsburgh (1950–1951)
- NFL draft: 1955: undrafted

Career history
- Pittsburgh Steelers (1955–1963); Washington Redskins (1964–1966)

Awards and highlights
- 3× Pro Bowl (1959-1961)

Career NFL statistics
- Interceptions: 15
- Fumble recoveries: 20
- Sacks: 10.5
- Stats at Pro Football Reference

John George Reger (September 11, 1931 – September 19, 2013) was a National Football League linebacker for the Pittsburgh Steelers and the Washington Redskins, and participated in three Pro Bowls during his 12-year career. Reger played college football at the University of Pittsburgh. He died in Tampa, Florida in 2013.

== Early life ==
Reger was born on September 11, 1931, in Wheeling, West Virginia. He attended Linsley Military Institute in Wheeling. He played fullback and linebacker on the school's football team. In 1949, he was named captain of the All-Ohio Valley Conference team, as well as being named All-Valley and All-City.

He married Janice McCray in 1950, and after leaving college early, and worked for five years at a Wheeling gas station.

In 1993, he was inducted into the Upper Ohio Valley Dapper Dan Hall of Fame.

== College football ==
Reger received a scholarship to the University of Pittsburgh. His freshman team was undefeated in 1950, but when he joined the varsity a year later, he suffered a knee injury in the third game, ending his college football and academic career.

== Professional football ==
=== Pittsburgh Steelers ===
In 1955, the Pittsburgh Steelers gave Reger a tryout on the recommendation of his Linsley football coach. The Steelers signed him to play guard and linebacker, but linebacker became his position. He started 10 games at right linebacker in 1955, with five fumble recoveries; and started eight at left linebacker in 1956, with two interceptions each of his first two years.

From 1957-60 he started every Steelers game at right linebacker, and had five fumble recoveries again, in 1957. He was named to the Pro Bowl in 1959 and 1960. He was selected the Steelers Most Valuable Player in 1959. In 1959, the Associated Press (AP) named him second-team All Pro, and The Sporting News selected him first-team All-Conference. In 1960, the Newspaper Enterprise Association (NEA) and United Press International (UPI) named him second-team All-Pro, with The Sporting News again naming him first-team All-Conference.

In 1961, the NFL went from a 12 to 14 game schedule, and Reger started 13 of 14 games for the Steelers. He was again named to the Pro Bowl, and was again selected by the NEA as a second-team All-Pro, and selected first-team All-Conference by The Sporting News. He played two more years for the Steelers, but only started a total of 11 games over that time.

In his final Steelers season, Reger was seriously injured in a game against the Philadelphia Eagles. He suffered a blow to the head that caused his throat to spasm, cutting off his air supply. An ambulance eventually came with oxygen and Reger was revived. Without that intervention, he would have died. Thereafter, the NFL required teams to have oxygen on the sideline.

=== Washington Redskins ===
Coach Buddy Parker waived Reger before the start of the 1964 season. Reger then spent his final three years in the NFL playing left linebacker for the Washington Redskins, starting in all 40 games he played. Reger had retired after the 1965 season, and moved to Florida to start a landscaping business. At the request of Washington coach Otto Graham, he came out of retirement for the 1966 season. In 1964 and 1966, he had career highs in interceptions (3), returning one for a touchdown in 1964. He had six quarterback sacks in 1964 out of his 10 total sacks, to go along with three fumble recoveries, while playing for Washington. The 1966 linebacking corps included Reger, and future Hall of Fame linebackers Sam Huff and Chris Hanburger.

Over his 12-year career, he had 15 interceptions, 20 fumble recoveries, and two defensive touchdowns.

== Personal life ==
After retiring, in 1971, Reger ended his landscaping business in Hollywood, Florida, and he and his family moved to Tampa, Florida, where they owned the Dam Shanty restaurant.

== Death ==
Reger died on September 19, 2013, in Tampa.
