= Jerry Leahy =

American football player (born 1934)

No. 66
- Position: Linebacker

Personal information
- Born: October 15, 1934 (age 92); Bay City, Michigan, U.S.
- Listed height: 6 ft 2 in (1.88 m)
- Listed weight: 220 lb (100 kg)

Career information
- High school: St. Joseph's (MI)
- College: Colorado
- NFL draft: 1957: 7th round, 83rd overall pick

Career history
- Pittsburgh Steelers (1957)

Awards and highlights
- First-team All-Big Seven (1956)

Career NFL statistics
- Games played: 1
- Stats at Pro Football Reference

Gerald Leo Leahy (born October 15, 1934) is an American former professional football player who was a linebacker for the Pittsburgh Steelers of the National Football League (NFL) in 1957. He played college football for the Colorado Buffaloes.

== Early life ==
Leahy was born in 1934 in Bay City, Michigan, and attended North St. Joseph's High School. He played college football as an end and linebacker for the Colorado Buffaloes from 1954 to 1956. He was a member of the 1956 Buffaloes team that won the 1957 Orange Bowl. He was a "near unanimous choice" for the 1956 All-Big Seven Conference football team.

== Professional career ==
Leahy was selected by the Detroit Lions in the seventh round (83rd overall pick) of the 1957 NFL draft. When Buddy Parker left the Lions to become coach of the Pittsburgh Steelers in 1957, he signed Leahy to come with him to Pittsburgh. Leahy appeared in one game for the Steelers in 1957. He was signed again by the Steelers in May 1958. He was dropped by the Steelers at the end of August 1958.
