= Harold Davis (American football) =

American football and basketball player (1934–2007)

Profile
- Position: Quarterback

Personal information
- Born: May 12, 1934; Youngstown, Ohio, U.S.
- Died: December 9, 2007 (aged 73); Bloomfield Hills, Michigan, U.S.

Career information
- College: Westminster College (1953–1956)

Awards and highlights
- College Football Hall of Fame (2004); Three-time First-team All-American

Harold Davis (May 12, 1934 – December 9, 2007) was an American college football and basketball player at Westminster College, Pennsylvania. A quarterback who could run as well as throw, he was inducted into the College Football Hall of Fame in 2004.

Davis was one of four men from Westminster inducted the College Football Hall of Fame. He was a standout quarterback for the Titans from 1953 to 1956 and became the only three-time, first-team All-America football player in school history. Davis, who played quarterback under Hall of Fame head coach Harold Burry during a time when African Americans rarely played the position, led Westminster to an overall record of 28–1–1 (.950), including the first undefeated seasons in school history in 1953 (8–0), 1955 (6–0–1) and 1956 (8–0). He was drafted in the ninth round of the 1957 NFL draft by the Philadelphia Eagles of the National Football League.

Davis was a native of Youngstown, Ohio and also lettered in basketball and track and field at Westminster. He graduated in 1957 with a degree in economics, served in the United States Army, and worked for the Youngstown City School District and the Xerox Corporation. He lived in Bloomfield Hills, Michigan, where he died in December 2007 of cancer.
