= Bob O'Neil =

American football player (1931–2012)

Huck O'Neil
No. 86, 51, 45, 65, 62
- Positions: Defensive end, guard, linebacker

Personal information
- Born: February 21, 1931; Bridgeville, Pennsylvania, U.S.
- Died: April 29, 2012 (aged 81); Seattle, Washington, U.S.
- Listed height: 6 ft 1 in (1.85 m)
- Listed weight: 229 lb (104 kg)

Career information
- High school: Bridgeville
- College: Duquesne (1949-1950); Notre Dame (1951-1952)
- NFL draft: 1953: 15th round, 173rd overall pick

Career history
- Pittsburgh Steelers (1956–1957); Calgary Stampeders (1958–1960); Montreal Alouettes (1960); New York Titans (1961)

Career NFL/AFL statistics
- Games played: 38
- Games started: 23
- Fumble recoveries: 1
- Stats at Pro Football Reference

Robert Maioli "Huck" O'Neil (February 21, 1931 – April 29, 2012) was an American professional football guard, defensive end and linebacker who played three seasons with the Pittsburgh Steelers and New York Titans in the National Football League (NFL). He played college football at Duquesne University for the Duquesne Dukes football team and the Notre Dame Fighting Irish football team. He also played for the Calgary Stampeders and Montreal Alouettes of the Canadian Football League (CFL).
