= 1957 Ottawa Rough Riders season =

Canadian football team season

- Head coach: Frank Clair
- Home stadium: Lansdowne Park

Results
- Record: 8–6
- Division place: 2nd, IRFU
- Playoffs: Lost East Semi-Final

The 1957 Ottawa Rough Riders finished in second place in the IRFU with an 8–6 record but lost to the Montreal Alouettes in the East Semi-Final.

== Preseason ==
Week	Date	Opponent	Result	Record
B	Aug 2	vs. Calgary Stampeders	W 23–14	1–0
C	Aug 8	vs. Saskatchewan Roughriders	W 14–7	2–0
C	Aug 10	at Winnipeg Blue Bombers	L 6–36	2–1
C	Aug 12	at Calgary Stampeders	L 7–26	2–2

== Regular season ==
=== Standings ===
Interprovincial Rugby Football Union
Team	GP	W	L	T	PF	PA	Pts
Hamilton Tiger-Cats	14	10	4	0	250	189	20
Ottawa Rough Riders	14	8	6	0	326	237	16
Montreal Alouettes	14	6	8	0	287	301	12
Toronto Argonauts	14	4	10	0	274	410	8

=== Schedule ===
Week	Game	Date	Opponent	Result	Record
1	1	Aug 20	vs. Hamilton Tiger-Cats	W 20–7	1–0
1	2	Aug 23	at Toronto Argonauts	W 22–17	2–0
2	3	Aug 31	at Montreal Alouettes	L 21–22	2–1
3	4	Sept 7	vs. Montreal Alouettes	W 17–16	3–1
4	5	Sept 14	at Hamilton Tiger-Cats	L 14–18	3–2
5	6	Sept 21	at Toronto Argonauts	W 55–14	4–2
6	7	Sept 28	vs. Toronto Argonauts	W 40–21	5–2
7	8	Oct 5	vs. Hamilton Tiger-Cats	L 17–18	5–3
8	9	Oct 12	vs. Montreal Alouettes	W 27–17	6–3
8	10	Oct 14	at Montreal Alouettes	L 24–32	6–4
9	11	Oct 19	at Toronto Argonauts	L 23–31	6–5
10	12	Oct 26	vs. Toronto Argonauts	W 25–7	7–5
11	13	Nov 2	vs. Hamilton Tiger-Cats	W 9–4	8–5
12	14	Nov 9	at Hamilton Tiger-Cats	L 12–13	8–6

== Postseason ==
=== Playoffs ===
Round	Date	Opponent	Result	Record	Venue	Attendance
East Semi-Final	Nov 13	vs. Montreal Alouettes	L 15–24	8–7		
