= 1957 Winnipeg Blue Bombers season =

Canadian football team season

- Head coach: Bud Grant
- Home stadium: Winnipeg Stadium

Results
- Record: 12–4
- Division place: 2nd, WIPU
- Playoffs: Lost Grey Cup

The 1957 Winnipeg Blue Bombers was the 25th season of the franchise.

== Regular season ==
Western Interprovincial Football Union
Team	GP	W	L	T	PF	PA	Pts
Edmonton Eskimos	16	14	2	0	475	142	28
Winnipeg Blue Bombers	16	12	4	0	406	300	24
Calgary Stampeders	16	6	10	0	221	413	12
BC Lions	16	4	11	1	284	369	9
Saskatchewan Roughriders	16	3	12	1	276	438	7

== Playoffs ==
=== Semifinals ===
Date	Away	Home
November 9	Calgary Stampeders 13	Winnipeg Blue Bombers 13
November 11	Winnipeg Blue Bombers 15	Calgary Stampeders 3

- Winnipeg won the total-point series by 28–16. The Blue Bombers play the Edmonton Eskimos in the WIFU Finals.

=== WIFU Finals ===
Date	Away	Home
November 16	Edmonton Eskimos 7	Winnipeg Blue Bombers 19
November 20	Winnipeg Blue Bombers 4	Edmonton Eskimos 5
November 23	Winnipeg Blue Bombers 17 (OT)	Edmonton Eskimos 2

- Winnipeg wins the best of three series 2–1. The Blue Bombers advance to the Grey Cup game.

=== Grey Cup ===
Team	Q1	Q2	Q3	Q4	Total
Winnipeg Blue Bombers	0	0	0	7	7
Hamilton Tiger-Cats	13	0	0	19	32
