= 1961 College Conference of Illinois football season =

- Sport: Football
- Teams: 7
- Champion: Millikin

Football seasons
- 1960 1962

1961 College Conference of Illinois football standings
	Conf.					Overall
Team	W		L		T	W		L		T
No. 14 Millikin $	6	–	0	–	0	8	–	0	–	0
Carroll (WI)	5	–	1	–	0	6	–	3	–	0
Carthage	4	–	2	–	0	7	–	2	–	0
North Central (IL)	3	–	3	–	0	5	–	4	–	0
Augustana (IL)	2	–	4	–	0	5	–	4	–	0
Illinois Wesleyan	1	–	5	–	0	2	–	7	–	0
Lake Forest	0	–	6	–	0	0	–	8	–	0
$ – Conference champion; Rankings from NAIA poll

The 1961 College Conference of Illinois football season was the season of college football played by the seven member schools of the College Conference of Illinois (CCI) as part of the 1961 college football season.

The 1961 Millikin Big Blue football team, in its sixth and final year under head coach Don Shroyer, compiled a perfect 8–0 record (6–0 in conference games), won the CCI championship, and was ranked 14th in the final National Association of Intercollegiate Athletics (NAIA) poll.

== Teams ==
=== Millikin ===
1961 Millikin Big Blue football

CCI champion
- Conference: College Conference of Illinois
- Record: 8–0 (7–0 CCI)
- Head coach: Don Shroyer (6th season)
- Captains: Jerry Domescik; Ryan Jorstad
- Home stadium: Millikin Field

The 1961 Millikin Big Blue football team was an American football team that represented Millikin University as a member of the College Conference of Illinois during the 1961 college football season. In their sixth and final year under head coach Don Shroyer, the Big Blue compiled a perfect 8–0 record (6–0 against conference opponents), won the CCI championship, and outscored opponents by a total of 305 to 79. Millikin was ranked 14th in the final National Association of Intercollegiate Athletics (NAIA) poll. The 1961 campaign was one of only four undefeated seasons in Millikin football history.

Date	Opponent	Site	Result	Attendance	Source
September 23	at Illinois State Normal*	McCormick Field; Normal, IL	W 22–0	1,000	
September 30	Carthage	Millikin Field; Decatur, IL	W 32–30		
October 7	North Park*	Millikin Field; Decatur, IL	W 72–0		
October 14	at Augustana (IL)	Rock Island, IL	W 39–7		
October 21	Lake Forest^{†}	Millikin Field; Decatur, IL	W 47–7	3,000	
October 28	at Illinois Wesleyan	IWU Stadium; Bloomington, IL	W 27–16		
November 4	North Central (IL)	Millikin Field; Decatur, IL	W 19–0		
November 11	at Carroll (WI)	Haertel Field; Waukesha, WI	W 47–13		
*Non-conference game; ^{†}Homecoming

=== Carroll ===
1961 Carroll Pioneers football
- Conference: College Conference of Illinois
- Record: 6–3 (5–1 CCI)
- Head coach: Vince DiFrancesca (3rd season)
- Home stadium: Haertel Field

The 1961 Carroll Pioneers football team was an American football team that represented Carroll College (now known as Carroll University) of Waukesha, Wisconsin, as a member of the College Conference of Illinois (CCI) during the 1961 college football season. In their third season under head coach Vince DiFrancesca, the Pioneers compiled a 6–3 record (5–1 in CCI games), finished in second place in the CCI, and were outscored by a total of 174 to 157.

Date	Opponent	Site	Result	Attendance	Source
September 16	at Whitewater State*	Whitewater, WI	L 6–28		
September 23	Carthage	Haertel Field; Waukesha, WI	W 19–6		
September 30	at North Park*	Chicago, IL	W 19–13		
October 7	Augustana (IL)	Haertel Field; Waukesha, WI	W 21–14		
October 14	at Lake Forest	Lake Forest IL	W 26–7		
October 21	Illinois Wesleyan	Haertel Field; Waukesha, WI	W 27–19		
October 28	at North Central (IL)	Naperville, IL	W 19–13		
November 4	at Wheaton (IL)*	McCully Field; Wheaton, IL	L 7–27		
November 11	Millikin	Haertel Field; Waukesha, WI	L 13–47		
*Non-conference game

=== Carthage ===
1961 Carthage Redmen football
- Conference: College Conference of Illinois
- Record: 7–2 (4–2 CCI)
- Head coach: Art Keller (7th season)

The 1961 Carthage Redmen football team was an American football team that represented Carthage College of Carthage, Illinois, as a member of the College Conference of Illinois (CCI) during the 1961 college football season. In their seventh season under head coach Art Keller, the Redmen compiled a 7–2 record (4–3 in CCI games), finished in third place in the CCI, and outscored opponents by a total of 267 to 127.

Date	Opponent	Site	Result	Attendance	Source
September 16	at Augustana (IL)	Ericson Field; Rock Island, IL	W 33–13		
September 23	at Carroll (WI)	Haertel Field; Waukesha, WI	L 6–19		
September 30	at Millikin	Millikin Field; Decatur, IL	L 20–32		
October 7	Illinois Wesleyan	Carthage, IL	W 33–12		
October 14	Kalamazoo*	Carthage, IL	W 33–6	2,300	
October 21	North Park*	Carthage, IL	W 38–19		
October 28	at Lake Forest	Lake Forest, IL	W 42–13		
November 4	Culver–Stockton*	Carthage, IL	W 21–0		
November 18	North Central (IL)	Carthage, IL	W 41–13		
*Non-conference game

=== North Central ===
1961 North Central Cardinals football
- Conference: College Conference of Illinois
- Record: 5–4 (3–3 CCI)
- Head coach: Jesse Vail (6th season)

The 1961 North Central Cardinals football team represented North Central College of Naperville, Illinois, during the 1961 college football season. In their sixth season under head coach Jesse Vail, the Cardinals compiled a 5–4 record (3–3 against CCI opponents), placing in fourth place in the CCI.

Date	Opponent	Site	Result	Attendance	Source
September 23	at Fisk*		W 15–14	850	
September 30	at Augustana		W 33–16	700	
October 7	Lake Forest	Naperville, IL	W 27–3	1,200	
October 14	at Illinois Wesleyan	IWU Stadium; Bloomington, IL	W 13–7	3,000	
October 21	Wheaton*	Naperville, IL (Little Brass Bell)	L 7–20	7,500	
October 28	Carroll	Naperville, IL	L 13–19	2,900	
November 4	at Millikin		L 0–19	3,300	
November 11	North Park*	Naperville, IL	W 26–7	3,000	
November 18	at Carthage		L 14–41	2,000	
*Non-conference game

=== Augustana ===
1961 Augustana (Illinois) Vikings football
- Conference: College Conference of Illinois
- Record: 5–4 (2–4 CCI)
- Head coach: Ray B. Leoschner (3rd season)

The 1961 Augustana Vikings football team represented Augustana College of Rock Island, Illinois, during the 1961 college football season. In their third season under head coach Ray B. Leoschner, the Vikings compiled a 5–4 record (2–4 against CCI opponents), placing in fifth place in the CCI.

Date	Opponent	Site	Result	Attendance	Source
September 16	Carthage	Rock Island, IL	L 13–33		
September 23	at Manchester*	North Manchester, IN	W 14–6		
September 30	North Central	Rock Island, IL	L 16–33		
October 7	at Carroll	Waukesha, WI	L 14–21		
October 14	Millikin	Rock Island, IL	L 7–39		
October 21	at Wartburg*	Waverly, IA	W 20–8		
October 28	at William Penn*	Oskaloosa, IA	W 14–7		
November 4	Lake Forest	Rock Island, IL	W 21–10		
November 11	at Illinois Wesleyan	Bloomington, IL	W 21–13		
*Non-conference game

=== Illinois Wesleyan ===
1961 Illinois Wesleyan Titans football
- Conference: College Conference of Illinois
- Record: 2–7 (1–5 CCI)
- Head coach: Don Larson (8th season)

The 1961 Illinois Wesleyan football team represented Illinois Wesleyan University of Bloomington, Illinois, during the 1961 college football season. In their eighth season under head coach Don Larson, the Foresters compiled a 2–7 record (1–5 against CCI opponents), placing in sixth place in the CCI.

Date	Opponent	Site	Result	Attendance	Source
September 23	DePauw*	IWU Stadium; Bloomington, IL	L 0–8		
September 30	at Lake Forest	Lake Forest, IL	W 13–6	1,500	
October 7	at Carthage	Carthage, IL	L 12–33		
October 14	North Central	IWU Stadium; Bloomington, IL	L 7–13	3,000	
October 21	at Carroll	Haertel Field; Waukesha, WI	L 19–27		
October 28	Millikin	IWU Stadium; Bloomington, IL	L 16–27		
	North Park*		W 20–7		
November 11	Augustana	IWU Stadium; Bloomington, IL	L 13–21		
November 18	at Illinois State Normal*	Normal, IL	L 6–16		
*Non-conference game

=== Lake Forest ===
1961 Lake Forest Foresters football
- Conference: College Conference of Illinois
- Record: 0–8 (0–6 CCI)
- Head coach: Nick Wasylik (4th season)

The 1961 Lake Forest Foresters football team represented Lake Forest College of Lake Forest, Illinois, during the 1961 college football season. In their fourth season under head coach Nick Wasylik, the Foresters compiled a 0–8 record (0–6 against CCI opponents), placing in last place in the CCI.

Date	Opponent	Site	Result	Attendance	Source
September 23	North Park*	Lake Forest, IL	L 0–6	1,000	
September 30	Illinois Wesleyan	Lake Forest, IL	L 6–13	1,500	
October 7	at North Central	Naperville, IL	L 3–27	1,200	
October 14	Carroll	Lake Forest, IL	L 7–26	2,500	
October 21	at Millikin	Millikin Field; Decatur, IL	L 4–47	3,000	
October 28	Carthage	Lake Forest, IL	L 13–42		
November 4	at Augustana	Rock Island, IL	L 10–21		
November 11	Hamline*	Lake Forest, IL	L 7–32		
*Non-conference game
