= WAEB =

WAEB may refer to:

- WAEB (AM), a radio station (790 AM) licensed to Allentown, Pennsylvania, United States
- WAEB-FM, a radio station (104.1 FM) licensed to Allentown, Pennsylvania, United States
