= 1961 Carthage Redmen football team =

American college football season

1961 Carthage Redmen football
- Conference: College Conference of Illinois
- Record: 7–2 (4–2 CCI)
- Head coach: Art Keller (7th season)

1961 College Conference of Illinois football standings
	Conf.					Overall
Team	W		L		T	W		L		T
No. 14 Millikin $	6	–	0	–	0	8	–	0	–	0
Carroll (WI)	5	–	1	–	0	6	–	3	–	0
Carthage	4	–	2	–	0	7	–	2	–	0
North Central (IL)	3	–	3	–	0	5	–	4	–	0
Augustana (IL)	2	–	4	–	0	5	–	4	–	0
Illinois Wesleyan	1	–	5	–	0	2	–	7	–	0
Lake Forest	0	–	6	–	0	0	–	8	–	0
$ – Conference champion; Rankings from NAIA poll

The 1961 Carthage Redmen football team was an American football team that represented Carthage College of Carthage, Illinois, as a member of the College Conference of Illinois (CCI) during the 1961 college football season. In their seventh season under head coach Art Keller, the Redmen compiled a 7–2 record (4–3 in CCI games), finished in third place in the CCI, and outscored opponents by a total of 267 to 127.

On October 7, 1961, Carthage commenced a 19-game winning streak, that continued through the entire 1962 season, became the longest winning streak in the country, and ended with a loss to Augustana on October 26, 1963.

The 1961 team tallied 3,482 yards of total offense (386.4 yards per game), consisting of 2,506 rushing yards (278.5 yards per game) and 972 passing yards (108 yards per game). On defense, Carthage gave up 1,194 yards (215 yards per game) to its opponents, including 1,194 rushing yards and 738 passing yards.

Quarterback Bob Halsey led the team in multiple categories, including passing yards (814), total offense (1,379 yards), and scoring (86 points on 10 touchdowns and 26 extra point kicks). Fullback Erv Olson was the leader with 807 rushing yards, and end Dave Werner led with 319 receiving yards.

Six Carthage players received first-team honors on the 1961 All-CCI football team: Bob Halsey at quarterback; Erv Olson at fullback; Jim Nelson at center; Tom Finn at tackle (defense); Doug Donoho at linebacker; and Daver Werner at defensive halfbacks.

== Schedule ==
Date	Opponent	Site	Result	Attendance	Source
September 16	at Augustana (IL)	Ericson Field; Rock Island, IL	W 33–13		
September 23	at Carroll (WI)	Haertel Field; Waukesha, WI	L 6–19		
September 30	at Millikin	Millikin Field; Decatur, IL	L 20–32		
October 7	Illinois Wesleyan	Carthage, IL	W 33–12		
October 14	Kalamazoo*	Carthage, IL	W 33–6	2,300	
October 21	North Park*	Carthage, IL	W 38–19		
October 28	at Lake Forest	Lake Forest, IL	W 42–13		
November 4	Culver–Stockton*	Carthage, IL	W 21–0		
November 18	North Central (IL)	Carthage, IL	W 41–13		
*Non-conference game
