= Lehigh Valley Phantoms =

American Hockey League team in Allentown, Pennsylvania

- City: Allentown, Pennsylvania
- League: American Hockey League
- Conference: Eastern
- Division: Atlantic
- Founded: 1996
- Home arena: PPL Center
- Colors: Black, orange, electric blue, white
- Owners: The Brooks Group (Robert and Jim Brooks)
- General manager: Alyn McCauley (de facto - Assistant General Manager, Philadelphia Flyers)
- Head coach: John Snowden
- Captain: Garrett Wilson
- Media: The Morning Call; WFMZ-TV channel 69; WAEB (AM) – AM 790; WSAN – AM 1470; Service Electric Cable TV2 Sports; AHL.TV (Internet)
- Affiliates: Philadelphia Flyers (NHL); Reading Royals (ECHL)

Franchise history
- 1996–2009: Philadelphia Phantoms
- 2009–2014: Adirondack Phantoms
- 2014–present: Lehigh Valley Phantoms

Championships
- Division titles: 1 (2017–18)

The Lehigh Valley Phantoms are a professional ice hockey team based in Allentown, Pennsylvania. The team competes in the American Hockey League (AHL) and serves as the primary development team for the Philadelphia Flyers of the National Hockey League.

The Phantoms have been the top minor league affiliate for the Flyers since the 1996–97 season, playing in Philadelphia as the Philadelphia Phantoms from 1996 until 2009, then in Glens Falls, New York, as the Adirondack Phantoms from 2010 until 2013, and in Allentown as the Lehigh Valley Phantoms since 2014.

The Lehigh Valley Phantoms play their home games at PPL Center, an 8,500 capacity, $282 million indoor arena that opened in downtown Allentown on September 10, 2014.

== History ==
In March 2011, plans were announced for a new arena, the PPL Center, in downtown Allentown, Pennsylvania. Demolition at the arena site began in January 2012. In February 2012, it was announced that the Adirondack Phantoms, a franchise that originated as the Philadelphia Phantoms, would relocate to the PPL Center in Allentown from Glens Falls, New York. The franchise originally intended to begin play in Allentown in 2013, but due to litigation over the construction of PPL Center, the team did not play until the 2014–15 AHL season. The purple color used since the team's inception was replaced by electric blue when the team relocated to the Lehigh Valley.

The arena has been consistently full. During the 2015–16 season, the PPL Center was filled at a 97.9% capacity on average, and had 24 sellouts in the 38 Phantoms home games, including the last 13. The Phantoms finished seventh in the AHL attendance rankings with an average of 8,244 fans, surpassed only by teams with larger venues.

== Mascot ==
On August 13, 2014, the Phantoms introduced their new mascot "meLVin". meLVin wears the number 55, which is LV in Roman numerals. The LV refers to Lehigh Valley. He became the Phantoms' third mascot after "Phlex" (Philadelphia Phantoms) and "Dax" (Adirondack Phantoms).

== Season-by-season results ==
Calder Cup champions	Conference champions	Division champions	League leader

Records as of April 21, 2026.

Regular season												Playoffs					
Season	GP	W	L	T	OTL	SOL	Pts	PCT	GF	GA	Standing	Year	Prelims	1st round	2nd round	3rd round	Finals
2014–15	76	33	35	—	7	1	74	.487	194	237	4th, East	2015	Did not qualify				
2015–16	76	34	35	—	4	3	75	.493	215	222	7th, Atlantic	2016	Did not qualify				
2016–17	76	48	23	—	5	0	101	.664	260	219	2nd, Atlantic	2017	—	L, 2–3, HER	—	—	—
2017–18	76	47	19	—	5	5	104	.684	260	218	1st, Atlantic	2018	—	W, 3–1, PRO	W, 4–1, CHA	L, 0–4, TOR	—
2018–19	76	39	30	—	4	3	85	.559	240	244	5th, Atlantic	2019	Did not qualify				
2019–20	62	24	28	—	3	7	58	.468	161	186	7th, Atlantic	2020	Season cancelled due to the COVID-19 pandemic				
2020–21	32	18	7	1 (Note: A game between the Phantoms and Binghamton Devils was suspended while tied and not completed, resulting in a 1–1 tie and a point for each team.)	4	2	43	.672	96	92	2nd, North	2021	No playoffs were held				
2021–22	76	29	32	—	10	5	73	.480	195	239	8th, Atlantic	2022	Did not qualify				
2022–23	72	37	29	—	3	3	80	.556	221	226	6th, Atlantic	2023	L, 1–2, CHA	—	—	—	—
2023–24	72	32	31	—	6	3	73	.507	191	217	6th, Atlantic	2024	W, 2–0, WBS	L, 1–3, HER	—	—	—
2024–25	72	36	28	—	6	2	80	.556	215	221	5th, Atlantic	2025	W, 2–0, WBS	L, 2–3, HER	—	—	—
2025–26	72	31	35	—	3	3	68	.472	210	247	7th, Atlantic	2026	Did not qualify				
Totals	838	408	332	1	60	37	914	.545	2458	2568			5 playoff appearances				

== Current roster ==
Updated October 28, 2026.

No.	Nat	Player	Pos	S/G	Age	Acquired	Birthplace	Contract
12	(United States)	Zach Aston-Reese	LW	L	32	2026	Staten Island, New York	Flyers
76	(United States)	Carson Bantle (PTO)	LW	L	24	2026	Onalaska, Wisconsin	Phantoms
64	(Canada)	Carson Bjarnason	G	L	21	2025	Carberry, Manitoba	Flyers
13	(Slovakia)	Alex Ciernik	LW	L	22	2025	Wolfsburg, Germany	Flyers
44	(United States)	Cam Dineen	D	L	28	2026	Toms River, New Jersey	Flyers
92	(Canada)	Jackson Edward	D	L	22	2026	Newmarket, Ontario	Flyers
25	(Canada)	Nolan Foote	LW	L	25	2026	Englewood, Colorado	Flyers
56	(Canada)	Jacob Gaucher (A)	F	R	25	2023	Longueuil, Quebec	Flyers
42	(Canada)	Spencer Gill	D	R	20	2026	Riverview, New Brunswick	Flyers
10	(Canada)	David Goyette	F	R	22	2026	Saint-Jérôme, Quebec	Flyers
3	(Sweden)	Helge Grans	D	R	24	2023	Ljungby, Sweden	Flyers
14	(United States)	Jonathan Gruden	C	L	26	2026	Rochester Hills, Michigan	Phantoms
91	(Sweden)	Carl Grundström	RW	L	28	2025	Umeå, Sweden	Flyers
18	(Belarus)	Danila Klimovich	RW	R	23	2026	Pinsk, Belarus	Flyers
35	(Belarus)	Aleksei Kolosov	G	L	24	2024	Minsk, Belarus	Flyers
77	(Canada)	Jett Luchanko	F	R	20	2025	London, Ontario	Flyers
27	(United States)	Owen McLaughlin	F	L	23	2026	Spring City, Pennsylvania	Phantoms
4	(United States)	Ty Murchison	D	L	23	2025	Corona, California	Flyers
90	(Russia)	Ilya Pautov	LW	L	20	2026	Novosibirsk, Russia	Flyers
65	(United States)	Andrew Perrott	D	R	25	2026	Detroit, Michigan	Phantoms
15	(United States)	Noah Powell	F	R	21	2026	Northbrook, Illinois	Flyers
46	(Canada)	Vincent Sevigny	D	R	25	2026	Quebec, Quebec	Phantoms
23	(Canada)	Jack Studnicka	C	R	27	2026	Tecumseh, Ontario	Flyers
9	(Canada)	Riley Thompson	F	L	24	2026	Ottawa, Ontario	Flyers
17	(Canada)	Garrett Wilson (C)	LW	L	35	2021	Elmvale, Ontario	Flyers
74	(Canada)	Zayde Wisdom	C	R	24	2021	Toronto, Ontario	Phantoms
26	(United States)	Cooper Wylie	D	L	25	2026	Stillwater, Minnesota	Phantoms

=== Team captains ===
- Colin McDonald, 2015–19
- Cal O'Reilly, 2020–23
- Garrett Wilson, 2023–present

== Team records ==
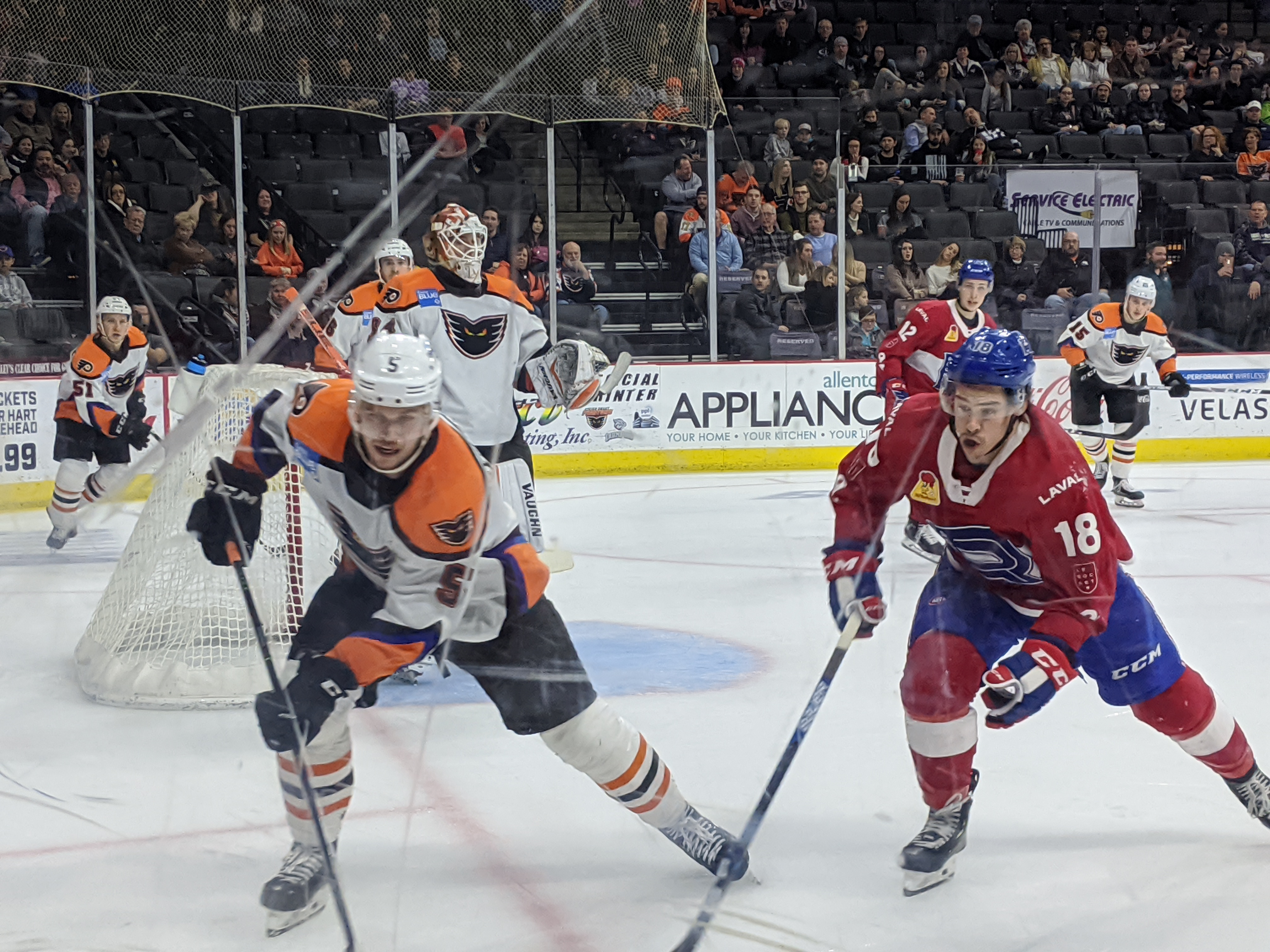
Lehigh Valley Phantoms take on Laval Rocket at PPL Center in Allentown, January 11, 2020

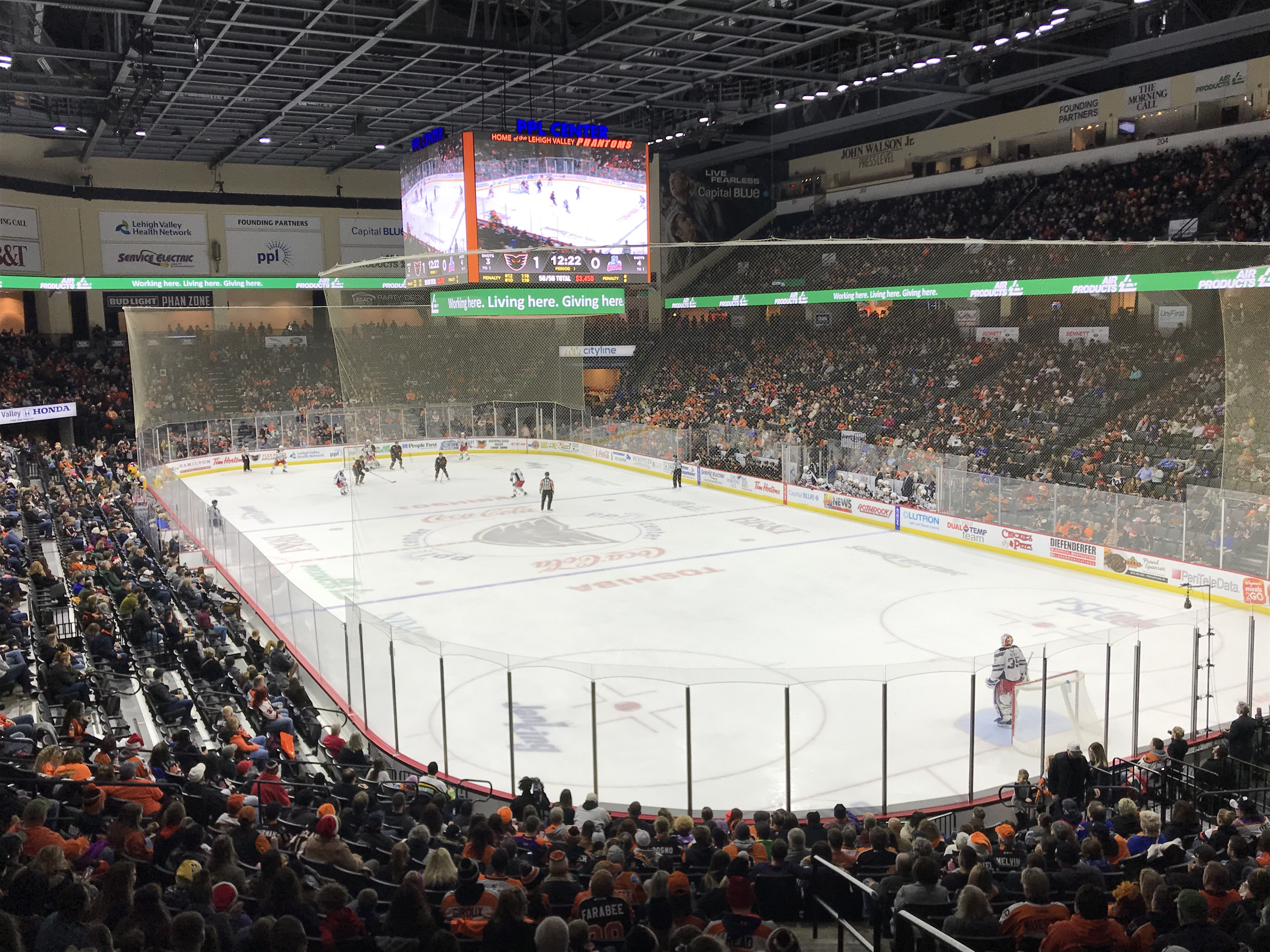
Lehigh Valley Phantoms play the Hartford Wolf Pack at PPL Center in Allentown, December 14, 2019

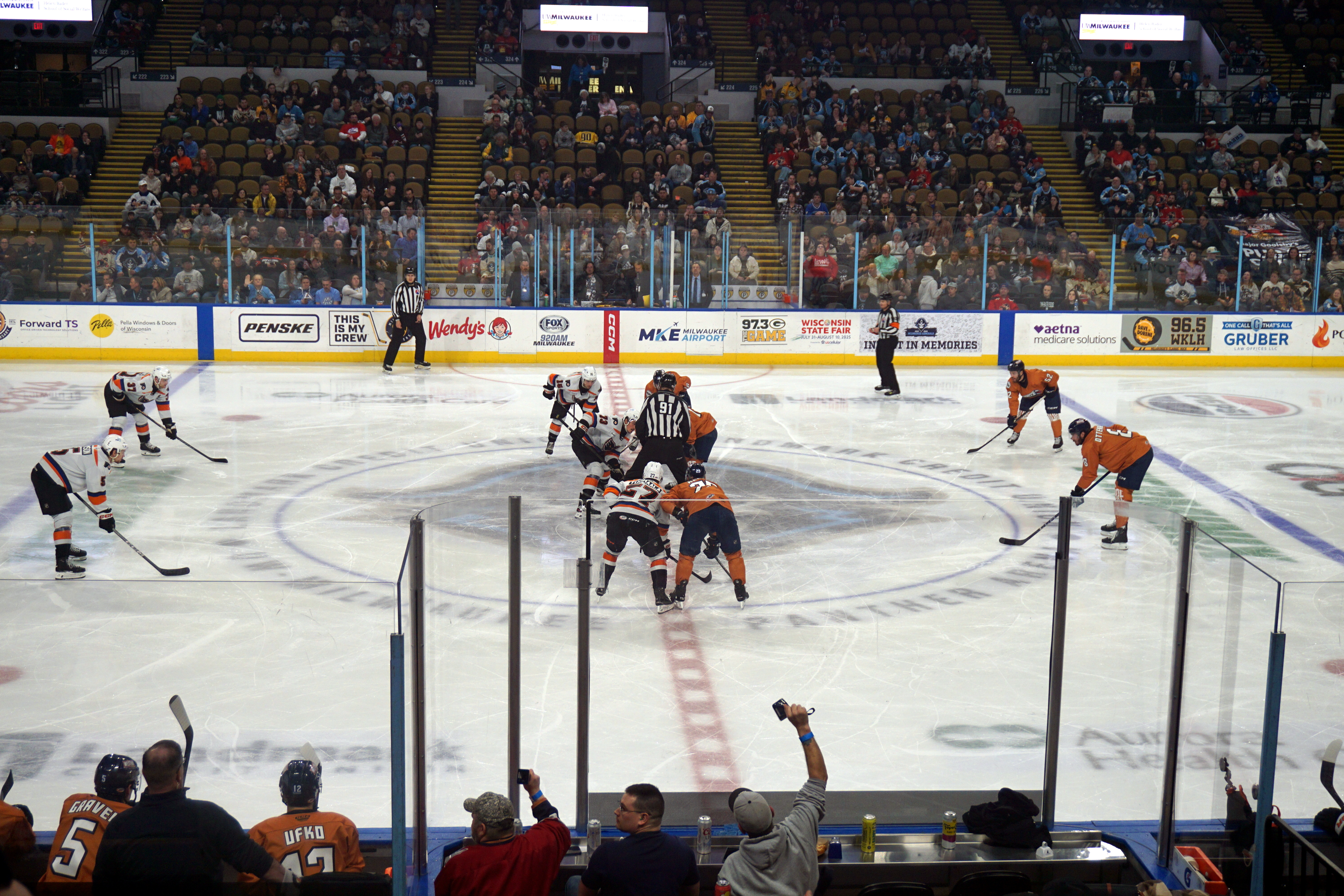
Lehigh Valley Phantoms play the Milwaukee Admirals in Milwaukee, February 25, 2025

As of the 2025–26 season

Single season
Goals: Greg Carey, 31 (2017–18)
Assists: Phil Varone, 47 (2017–18)
Points: Phil Varone, 70 (2017–18)
Penalty minutes: Jay Rosehill, 219 (2014–15)
GAA: Jean-Francois Berube, 2.56 (2019–20)
SV%: Rob Zepp, .917 (2014–15)
Wins: Alex Lyon (2016–17), 27
Shutouts: Dustin Tokarski (2017–18), 5

- Goaltending records need a minimum 25 games played by the goaltender

Career
Career goals: Greg Carey, 103
Career assists: Chris Conner, 128
Career points: Chris Conner, 199
Career penalty minutes: Garrett Wilson, 789
Career goaltending wins: Alex Lyon, 75
Career shutouts: Alex Lyon, 6
Career games: Garrett Wilson, 341

=== Individual awards ===
Les Cunningham Award (AHL Most Valuable Player)
Phil Varone 2017–18

First All-Star Team
T.J. Brennan 2016–17
Phil Varone: 2017–18

Second All-Star Team
T.J. Brennan 2017–18

=== American Hockey League Hall of Famers ===
AHL Hall of Fame Honored Members
Name	Seasons	Induction Year
Nolan Baumgartner	2006-07 (player)	2022
Dennis Bonvie	1998-99 (player)	2024
Denis Hamel	2010-12 (player)	2020
Michael Leighton	2006-07, 2010-13 (player)	2025
Rob Murray	2000-01 (player)	2017
John Paddock	2008-09, 2010-11 (head coach)	2010
Michel Picard	2000-01 (player)	2025
John Slaney	2000-07 (player)	2014
John Stevens	1996-99 (player); 1998-2000 (asst. coach); 2000-06 (head coach)	2012
Peter White	1996-2000, 2002-05 (player)	2013

== Head coaches ==
- Terry Murray: 2014–2015
- Scott Gordon: 2015–2018, 2019–2021
- Kerry Huffman: 2018–19 (interim)
- Ian Laperriere: 2021–2025
- John Snowden: 2025–present
