= Paul R. Wieand =

Paul Richard Wieand (March 3, 1907 – May 3, 1993) was a Pennsylvania German artist, playwright, folklorist, and linguist.

He was born in Guths Station, Pennsylvania, and earned a bachelor's degree from Kutztown State Teachers College in 1940. He was elected secretary of the Pennsylvania Guild of Craftsmen and served as its first treasurer in 1945. He was a radio broadcaster in the Pennsylvania German language on the Allentown radio station WSAN beginning in 1937. From 1944 to 1955, he played the female role, Sabina, in the regional radio series Assabe and Sabina.

Wieand was the founder and director of the Paul Wieand Folksingers. He was also a past president of the Parkland Flower Club and treasurer of the Pennsylvania Folk Cultural Society. He died in South Whitehall Township, Pennsylvania on May 3, 1993.

== Works ==
- Outdoor Games of the Pennsylvania Germans (1950)
- South Whitehall Then and Now (1976)
- Folk Medicine Plants Used in the Pennsylvania Dutch Country (1992)
- Pennsylvawnisch Deitsch: Music, Songs, Poetry (no date)
