= Panic Years =

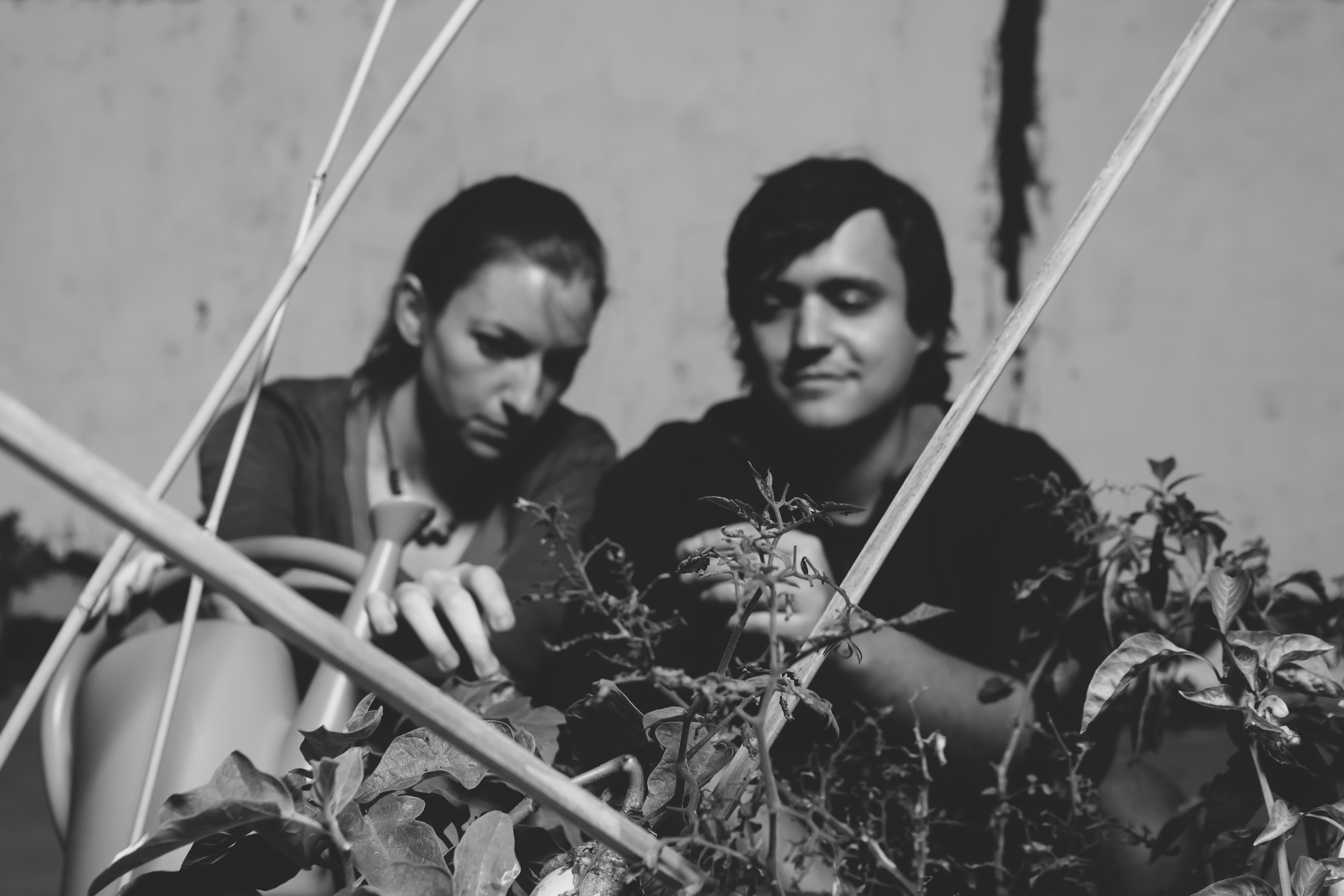
- Amy Miller & Edward Everett

Background information
- Origin: Philadelphia, Pennsylvania, United States
- Genres: Alternative/Indie Rock
- Years active: 2008 - 2016
- Labels: unsigned
- Members: Edward Everett (vocals); Amy Miller (guitar/keys)
- Past members: Kevin Kurtz (drums); Adam Smith (bass/keys) Daniel DiFranco; Jason Gooch Rebecca Todd
- Website: www.panicyearsband.com

Panic Years is an alternative/indie rock band from Philadelphia, Pennsylvania.

== History ==
Panic Years was formed by Edward Everett and Amy Miller in Virginia Beach, Virginia in 2008. After forming, they decided to relocate and visited a few cities before deciding on Philadelphia as their favorite.

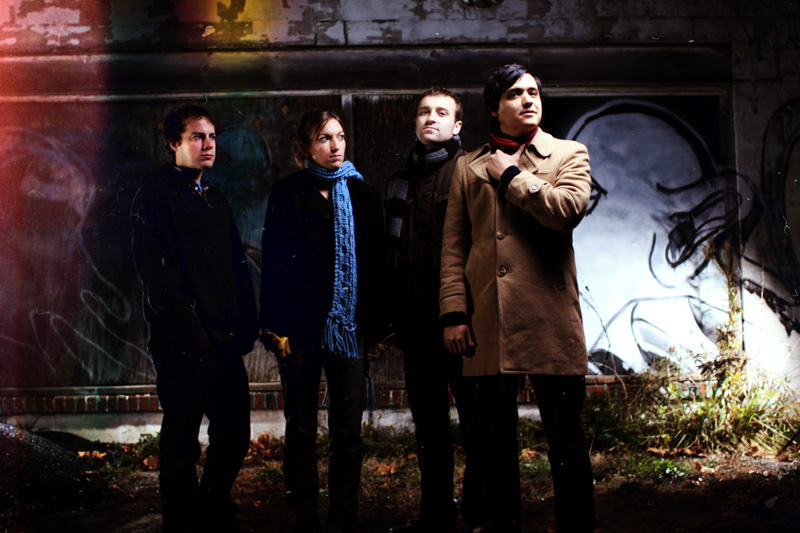
Adam Smith, Amy Miller, Kevin Kurtz & Edward Everett

In 2009, the band was chosen by Philadelphia Weekly to perform at the Concerts in the Park series in Rittenhouse Square. In 2010, Panic Years was one of 5 winners of the Musikfest Amped Up competition, earning a chance to perform at the annual music festival in Bethlehem, Pennsylvania. Later that year, they were chosen as a finalist in the WZZO Backyard Bands competition in Allentown, Pennsylvania. In 2011, the band performed at the Radio 104.5 Summer Block Party, along with The Airborne Toxic Event and The Naked and Famous.

"Sea Change" and "Farther" have both had radio success and the band has had licensing contracts with MTV and E! to play songs from their first EP on reality shows like "The City" and "Keeping Up with the Kardashians."

The band recorded their debut LP, The Month's Mind, in Fall 2011, which was released on June 12, 2012. The band states that large portions of the album were directly influenced by the book Steppenwolf by Hermann Hesse. The band co-produced the album with producer and engineer Mark Padgett, who plays bass in the band Mae.

== Musical style ==
The band combines passionate vocals, soft-then-loud transitions, clangy guitars and catchy melodies. WonkaVision Magazine praised the "catchy choruses" and "big riffs" on their eponymous debut EP. Katherine Silkaitis of Philadelphia Weekly describes their sound as a, "blend of late-‘90s alt-rock, lurching math-rock rhythms and ‘90s emo à la Mineral and Braid." Other comparisons include Foo Fighters and Silversun Pickups.

== Discography ==
=== EPs ===
- Panic Years (2008)
1. "Dig In"
2. "Backs Break"
3. "Sea Change"
4. "Magic"
5. "Pace"
- Finally Today is Tomorrow (2010)
1. "Our Futures"
2. "Let It Go or Say Goodbye"
3. "Farther"
4. "I Can't Help Myself"
5. "Stay Up"

=== LPs ===
- The Month's Mind (2012)

1. Intro
2. Control the Action
3. No More Explosions, No Sparks
4. Two Hearts
5. You and I
6. Bad Faith
7. Qualia
8. Anomie
9. The Same Haunt
10. The Month's Mind
