= 1955 Nebraska Cornhuskers football team =

American college football season

1955 Nebraska Cornhuskers football
- Conference: Big Seven Conference
- Record: 5–5 (5–1 Big 7)
- Head coach: Bill Glassford (7th season)
- Offensive scheme: Split-T
- Home stadium: Memorial Stadium

1955 Big Seven Conference football standings
| | Conf. | | | | | Overall |
| Team | W | | L | | T | W | | L | | T |
|---|---|---|---|---|---|---|---|---|---|---|
| No. 1 Oklahoma $ | 6 | – | 0 | – | 0 | 11 | – | 0 | – | 0 |
| Nebraska | 5 | – | 1 | – | 0 | 5 | – | 5 | – | 0 |
| Colorado | 3 | – | 3 | – | 0 | 6 | – | 4 | – | 0 |
| Kansas State | 3 | – | 3 | – | 0 | 4 | – | 6 | – | 0 |
| Kansas | 1 | – | 4 | – | 1 | 3 | – | 6 | – | 1 |
| Iowa State | 1 | – | 4 | – | 1 | 1 | – | 7 | – | 1 |
| Missouri | 1 | – | 5 | – | 0 | 1 | – | 9 | – | 0 |
$ – Conference champion; Rankings from AP Poll

The 1955 Nebraska Cornhuskers football team was the representative of the University of Nebraska and member of the Big 7 Conference in the 1955 college football season. The team was coached by Bill Glassford and played their home games at Memorial Stadium in Lincoln, Nebraska.

== Before the season ==
Coach Glassford returned for a seventh season, having survived pressure to step down at the end of the 1953 season by guiding the Cornhuskers through their first-ever 11-game season and to their first Orange Bowl appearance, though that had as much to do with the Big 7's no-repeat rule that prevented Big 7 champion Oklahoma from representing the league for consecutive years, as anything Glassford had accomplished with his own squad. Two new faces appeared on the coaching staff, one of them a former Cornhusker quarterback. The seasons under Coach Glassford had alternated between winning and losing records, and with last year's 6–5 result, history suggested that the Cornhuskers might be up for another down campaign, unless Glassford could break the pattern.

== Schedule ==
| Date | Time | Opponent | Site | Result | Attendance | Source |
|---|---|---|---|---|---|---|
| September 17 | 2:00 pm | Hawaii* | Memorial Stadium; Lincoln, NE | L 0–6 | 25,000 | |
| September 24 | 1:00 pm | at No. 6 Ohio State* | Ohio Stadium; Columbus, OH | L 20–28 | 80,171 | |
| October 1 | 2:00 pm | at Kansas State | Memorial Stadium; Manhattan, KS (rivalry) | W 16–0 | 12,500 | |
| October 8 | 2:00 pm | Texas A&M* | Memorial Stadium; Lincoln, NE | L 0–27 | 40,000 | |
| October 15 | 11:30 am | at Pittsburgh* | Pitt Stadium; Pittsburgh, PA | L 7–21 | 19,350–21,006 | |
| October 22 | 1:30 pm | at Missouri | Memorial Stadium; Columbia, MO (rivalry) | W 18–12 | 25,300 | |
| October 29 | 2:00 pm | Kansas | Memorial Stadium; Lincoln, NE (rivalry) | W 19–14 | 31,000 | |
| November 5 | 2:00 pm | at Iowa State | Clyde Williams Field; Ames, IA (rivalry) | W 10–7 | 11,237 | |
| November 12 | 2:00 pm | Colorado^{†} | Memorial Stadium; Lincoln, NE (rivalry) | W 37–20 | 34,000 | |
| November 19 | 2:00 pm | No. 1 Oklahoma | Memorial Stadium; Lincoln, NE (rivalry) | L 0–41 | 36,576 | |
*Non-conference game; ^{†}Homecoming; Rankings from AP Poll released prior to the game

== Roster ==
Official Roster
| 61 Bayer, Joe G (Jr.); 54 Berguin, Robert C (Jr.); 81 Braley, Jack E (Sr.); 35 Brown, Jerry FB (So.); 80 Butherus, LeRoy E (Jr.); 37 Cifra, George FB (Jr.); 36 Coffey, William FB (So.); 42 Comstock, Don HB (Jr.); 75 Cook, Richard T (So.); 89 Cupper, Robert E (So.); 16 Edwards, John FB (Sr.); 87 Edwards, William E (So.); 24 Englert, Gordon QB (Jr.); 25 Erway, Don QB (Jr.); 26 Fischer, Rex QB (Sr.); 71 Fleming, Jack T (Jr.); 69 George, Leo G (So.); 47 Greenlaw, William HB (Jr.); 38 Haman, Gene FB (So.); 43 Harris, Sylvester HB (Sr.); 27 Harshman, George QB (So.); 72 Hawkins, William T (So.); 84 Hewitt, Don E (Sr.); 83 Howerter, Stuart E (So.); 44 Johnson, Harry HB (Jr.) | 63 Jones, Larry G (Jr.); 64 Kampe, Lester G (So.); 82 Kleiber, Dick E (So.); 73 Klein, Arthur T (So.); 66 Lair, Gale G (Jr.); 86 Lux, Dean E (Sr.); 77 Lyall, Bob T (So.); 30 Martin, Lyle HB (So.); 85 McWilliams, Jon E (Sr.); 78 Moore, Richard T (Sr.); 67 Murphy, James G (Jr.); 45 Nappi, Frank HB (So.); 70 Neal, Richard T (Jr.); 19 Pickering, Farley HB (So.); 55 Post, Doran C (Jr.); 56 Prusia, Dick C (So.); 65 Pugsley, Jack G (So.); 79 Rhoda, Donald T (So.); 68 Sadowski, Joe G (So.); 46 Sandage, Gene HB (So.); 32 Scherer, Leo HB (Sr.); 51 Stewart, Merle G (So.); 62 Taylor, William G (Sr.); 50 Torczon, LaVerne C (Jr.); 74 Wheeler, Jerry T (So.) |

== Depth Chart ==
Defense by committee
| HB | HB |
| | LB / LB |
| CB | DE / DT / NT / DT / DE | CB |

Offensive starters

LE
LeRoy Butherus
Marlin Hilding

| LG | C | RG | LT | RT |
|---|---|---|---|---|
| William Taylor | Doran Post | Lester Kampe | LaVerne Torczon | Jack Fleming |
| Donald Rhoda | Robert Berguin | Arthur Klein | Jerry Brown | Jerry Wheeler.. |

RE
Jon McWilliams
Don Hewitt

QB
Don Erway
George Harshman

| LB | RB | FB |
|---|---|---|
| Rex Fischer | William Greenlaw | John Edwards |
| Sylvester Harris | Harry Johnson | George Cifra |

== Coaching staff ==
| Name | Title | First year in this position | Years at Nebraska | Alma mater |
|---|---|---|---|---|
| Bill Glassford | Head coach | 1949 | 1949–1955 | Pittsburgh |
| L. F. "Pop" Klein | Assistant coach | 1945 | 1945–1958 | |
| Bob Davis | Backfield Coach | 1949 | 1949–1955 | |
| Mike Milligan | | 1953 | 1953–1955 | Pittsburgh |
| Don Strasheim | | 1954 | 1954–1958 | Nebraska |
| John Kovach | | 1955 | 1955 | |
| Ed Nyden | | 1955 | 1955 | Nebraska |

== Game summaries ==
=== Hawaii ===
| Team | 1 | 2 | Total |
|---|---|---|---|
| • Hawaii | | | 6 |
| Nebraska | | | 0 |

- Date: September 17
- Location: Memorial Stadium • Lincoln, Nebraska
- Game attendance: 25,000

At the conclusion of the previous season, Nebraska traveled to Hawaii and dealt the Rainbows a severe 50–0 defeat. While Nebraska went on to play in the postseason at the 1955 Orange Bowl, Hawaii's season ended on the sour note, leaving the Rainbow squad to stew over the summer. The return visit in the home-and-home series was arranged as the first contest of the year for both teams, and so it was that Hawaii's arrival in Lincoln to open the 1955 slate was their second straight contest with the Cornhuskers. Whether Nebraska overlooked the Rainbows or the Hawaii team was bent on payback, the result was a lackluster Nebraska showing as Hawaii fought off all Cornhusker scoring attempts for the day. Nebraska never got closer than the Rainbow 13-yard line, yet Hawaii snuck through the Nebraska defenses to secure a single touchdown. Nebraska thus suffered a demoralizing shutout loss to start the season, the first opening blank since 1947.

=== Ohio State ===
| Team | 1 | 2 | Total |
|---|---|---|---|
| Nebraska | | | 20 |
| • #6 Ohio State | | | 28 |

- Date: September 24
- Location: Ohio Stadium • Columbus, Ohio
- Game attendance: 80,171

Stung by the humiliating loss to Hawaii, the Nebraska team put up a much more convincing effort against the reigning Big 10 and Rose Bowl champion Ohio State Buckeyes, who had also finished 1954 at #1 atop the AP Poll. The Cornhuskers even managed to briefly hold the lead in Columbus during the second quarter, but the Buckeyes held on to pull away by eight points. Ohio State notched the first win in the series between the squads, and went on to finish 1955 with a 7–2 record and ranked #5 by the AP.

=== Kansas State ===
| Team | 1 | 2 | Total |
|---|---|---|---|
| • Nebraska | | | 16 |
| Kansas State | | | 0 |

- Date: October 1
- Location: Memorial Stadium • Manhattan, Kansas
- Game attendance: 12,500

The Nebraska football players traveled to Manhattan with a chip on their shoulder, having dropped the first two games of the year and wanting to break the pattern that seemed to doom them to a losing season. Kansas State was in the wrong place at the wrong time, and the Wildcats were swept aside when the Cornhusker machine finally came to life in the third quarter to start the scoring. By the final whistle, Nebraska had a shutout victory of their own to hold onto, had snapped their two-game skid to the Wildcats, and improved to 31–6–2 over Kansas State all-time.

=== Texas A&M ===
| Team | 1 | 2 | Total |
|---|---|---|---|
| • Texas A&M | | | 27 |
| Nebraska | | | 0 |

- Date: October 8
- Location: Memorial Stadium • Lincoln, Nebraska
- Game attendance: 40,000

Nebraska welcomed Texas A&M back to Lincoln for the second time, having not met the Aggies on the field since their initial meeting, a 13–0 win in 1930. Apparently Texas A&M remembered the shutout, as they returned the favor 25 years later, finding the end zone three times in the second quarter to stun the Cornhuskers into submission, shutting them out 0–27 on the day, and knocking Nebraska down to a 1–3 start on the season.

=== Pittsburgh ===
| Team | 1 | 2 | Total |
|---|---|---|---|
| Nebraska | | | 7 |
| • Pittsburgh | | | 21 |

- Date: October 15
- Location: Pitt Stadium • Pittsburgh
- Game attendance: 21,006

Nebraska played Pittsburgh with a series record of 13–3–3 in favor of the Panthers. After Nebraska took an initial lead, Pittsburgh scored 21 points to win the game.

=== Missouri ===
| Team | 1 | 2 | Total |
|---|---|---|---|
| • Nebraska | | | 18 |
| Missouri | | | 12 |

- Date: October 22
- Location: Faurot Field • Columbia, Missouri

Missouri could have made a game of this contest and likely would have been victorious save for a lost fumble converted into a touchdown, an interception returned for a touchdown, and a punt returned for a touchdown. Missouri punched in two of their own touchdowns, which was not enough to extract a win in Columbus. The Cornhusker victory moved Nebraska to 27–18–3 in the series and kept the Victory Bell in Lincoln for another year.

=== Kansas ===
| Team | 1 | 2 | Total |
|---|---|---|---|
| Kansas | | | 14 |
| • Nebraska | | | 19 |

- Date: October 29
- Location: Memorial Stadium • Lincoln, Nebraska
- Game attendance: 31,000

Kansas smelled blood in the water as Nebraska struggled to recover the season, and fought bravely in Lincoln to overcome Nebraska's initial score and hold the lead for a time at 14–6. Somehow the beleaguered Cornhuskers overcame the challenge to put more points up and sent the Jayhawks home without a win. It was the 4th Nebraska win in a row against Kansas, advancing the series to 45–13–3 overall.

=== Iowa State ===
| Team | 1 | 2 | Total |
|---|---|---|---|
| • Nebraska | | | 10 |
| Iowa State | | | 7 |

- Date: November 5
- Location: Clyde Williams Field • Ames, Iowa
- Game attendance: 12,000

The Cornhuskers claimed their tenth straight win over the Cyclones in Ames, keeping their season conference record unblemished to date. Iowa State finally managed to put points on the board in the 4th quarter, drawing up to 7–10, but Nebraska turned away all further scoring attempts and held on for the win, improving to 40–8–1 in the series.

=== Colorado ===
| Team | 1 | 2 | Total |
|---|---|---|---|
| Colorado | | | 20 |
| • Nebraska | | | 37 |

- Date: November 12
- Location: Memorial Stadium • Lincoln, Nebraska
- Game attendance: 34,000

Nebraska shocked the Buffaloes by jumping out to a 21–0 lead early in the first quarter of the game. Though Colorado made a respectable counterattack to put up two scores of their own by the half, and a subsequent Cornhusker kickoff fumble on their own 20 briefly put the game back in doubt. The Nebraska defense stood firm to overcome the blunder, and the Cornhuskers never looked back on their way to improving to 9–5–0 in the series. Remaining undefeated in conference play, this win set up Nebraska to meet Oklahoma for the conference title.

=== Oklahoma ===
| Team | 1 | 2 | Total |
|---|---|---|---|
| • #1 Oklahoma | | | 41 |
| Nebraska | | | 0 |

- Date: November 19
- Location: Memorial Stadium • Lincoln, Nebraska
- Game attendance: 38,000

The Oklahoma Sooners arrived in Lincoln to defend the conference championship, ranked #1 by the AP Poll. Both teams were undefeated in Big 7 play on the season, which meant that this game would decide the conference title for 1955. The Sooners managed to put in two touchdowns in the first half, while Nebraska fought to keep the game respectable by pulling up as close as the Oklahoma 8 yard line at one point. The second half told a different story as the Cornhuskers were no longer able to stave off the attack, and fell under the weight of an additional four Oklahoma scores. This was the 13th straight Nebraska loss to Oklahoma, an ongoing record Nebraska losing streak to any single team, but was more painful in that the Sooners had finally drawn up and evened the series record to 16–16–3.

== After the season ==
Coach Glassford's up-and-down career pattern of alternating winning and losing seasons was finally broken, though instead of the losing season that seemed foretold, he also failed to come up with a winning season, as the Nebraska Cornhuskers finished evenly at 5–5–0 overall. Within conference play, the story was improved, as Nebraska's only loss was to the national championship Oklahoma team, leaving the Cornhuskers up at #2 in the Big 7. Coach Glassford decided at the conclusion of the 1955 campaign to exercise an option in his coaching contract, and stepped down from the position with a final seven-year Nebraska overall record of 31–35–3 (.471) and a conference record of 23–18–1 (.560) During his tenure, the football program's records fell to 347–183–34 (.645) overall and 143–55–12 (.710) within the league. Coach Glassford retired from athletics to pursue other career opportunities.

== Future NFL and other professional league players ==
- Laverne Torczon, 1957 18th-round pick of the Cleveland Browns
