= 1955 Kansas State Wildcats football team =

American college football season

1955 Kansas State Wildcats football
- Conference: Big Seven Conference
- Record: 4–6 (3–3 Big 7)
- Head coach: Bus Mertes (1st season)
- Home stadium: Memorial Stadium

1955 Big Seven Conference football standings
	Conf.					Overall
Team	W		L		T	W		L		T
No. 1 Oklahoma $	6	–	0	–	0	11	–	0	–	0
Nebraska	5	–	1	–	0	5	–	5	–	0
Colorado	3	–	3	–	0	6	–	4	–	0
Kansas State	3	–	3	–	0	4	–	6	–	0
Kansas	1	–	4	–	1	3	–	6	–	1
Iowa State	1	–	4	–	1	1	–	7	–	1
Missouri	1	–	5	–	0	1	–	9	–	0
$ – Conference champion; Rankings from AP Poll

The 1955 Kansas State Wildcats football team represented Kansas State University in the 1955 college football season. The team's head football coach was Bus Mertes, in his first year at the helm of the Wildcats. The Wildcats played their home games in Memorial Stadium. 1955 saw the Wildcats finish with a record of 4–6, and a 3–3 record in Big Seven Conference play. The Wildcats scored 165 points while giving up 191. They finished tied for third in the Big Seven. Ten Days before the Kansas game on November 5, K-State's mascot Touchdown IV was stolen by Kansas students. At the end of the first quarter the mascot was returned but the theft had already been avenged as K-State led the Jayhawks, 26–0, at that point and went on to defeat Kansas, 46–0.

== Schedule ==
Date	Opponent	Site	Result	Attendance	Source
September 17	Wyoming*	Memorial Stadium; Manhattan, KS	L 20–38	12,000	
September 24	at Iowa*	Iowa Stadium; Iowa City, IA	L 7–28	44,500	
October 1	Nebraska	Memorial Stadium; Manhattan, KS (rivalry)	L 0–16	12,500	
October 8	at Marquette*	Marquette Stadium; Milwaukee, WI	W 42–0	13,500	
October 15	No. 20 Colorado	Memorial Stadium; Manhattan, KS (rivalry)	L 13–34	16,500	
October 22	at Iowa State	Clyde Williams Field; Ames, IA (rivalry)	W 9–7	14,740	
October 29	No. 2 Oklahoma^{†}	Memorial Stadium; Manhattan, KS	L 7–40	18,263	
November 5	at Kansas	Memorial Stadium; Lawrence, KS (rivalry)	W 46–0	26,000	
November 12	at Missouri	Memorial Stadium; Columbia, MO	W 21–0	16,500	
November 19	at Oklahoma A&M*	Lewis Field; Stillwater, OK	L 0–28	10,000	
*Non-conference game; ^{†}Homecoming; Rankings from AP Poll released prior to the game
