= Harry Hess Reichard =

American German writer and scholar

Harry Hess Reichard (August 27, 1878 – August 26, 1956) was a Pennsylvania German writer and scholar.

== Biography ==
Reichard was born in Lower Saucon Township, Pennsylvania. In 1901, he graduated from Lafayette College in Easton, Pennsylvania. In 1911, he received his Ph.D. from Johns Hopkins University in Baltimore.

From 1924 to 1948, Reichard was a professor of German at Muhlenberg College in Allentown, Pennsylvania. He also portrayed the character of Der Assabe Mumbauer on the popular Pennsylvania German dialect radio program, Assabe and Sabina from 1944 to 1955.

For his work, Reichard was awarded a citation by the Pennsylvania German Society in 1950.

== Publications ==
- Pennsylvania-German Dialect Writings and Their Writers (1918)
- Pennsylvania German Verses (1940)
