= 1955 Colorado Buffaloes football team =

American college football season

1955 Colorado Buffaloes football
- Conference: Big Seven Conference
- Record: 6–4 (3–3 Big 7)
- Head coach: Dallas Ward (8th season)
- Captain: Game captains
- Home stadium: Folsom Field

1955 Big Seven Conference football standings
	Conf.					Overall
Team	W		L		T	W		L		T
No. 1 Oklahoma $	6	–	0	–	0	11	–	0	–	0
Nebraska	5	–	1	–	0	5	–	5	–	0
Colorado	3	–	3	–	0	6	–	4	–	0
Kansas State	3	–	3	–	0	4	–	6	–	0
Kansas	1	–	4	–	1	3	–	6	–	1
Iowa State	1	–	4	–	1	1	–	7	–	1
Missouri	1	–	5	–	0	1	–	9	–	0
$ – Conference champion; Rankings from AP Poll

The 1955 Colorado Buffaloes football team was an American football team that represented the University of Colorado as a member of the Big Seven Conference during the 1955 college football season. Led by eighth-year head coach Dallas Ward, the Buffaloes compiled an overall record of 6–4 with a mark of 3–3 in conference play, tying for third place in the Big 7.

== Schedule ==
Date	Opponent	Rank	Site	TV	Result	Attendance	Source
September 24	Arizona*		Folsom Field; Boulder, CO		W 14–0	28,000	
October 1	Kansas		Folsom Field; Boulder, CO		W 12–0	22,500	
October 8	at Oregon*		Hayward Field; Eugene, OR	NBC	W 13–6	12,500	
October 15	at Kansas State	No. 20	Memorial Stadium; Manhattan, KS (rivalry)		W 34–13	16,500	
October 22	at No. 3 Oklahoma	No. 14	Owen Field; Norman, OK	NBC	L 21–56	57,663	
October 29	Missouri^{†}		Folsom Field; Boulder, CO		L 12–20	30,000	
November 5	Utah*		Folsom Field; Boulder, CO (rivalry)		W 37–7	20,500	
November 12	at Nebraska		Memorial Stadium; Lincoln, NE (rivalry)		L 20–37	34,000	
November 19	Iowa State		Folsom Field; Boulder, CO		W 40–0	12,500	
November 26	at Colorado A&M*		Colorado Field; Fort Collins, CO (rivalry)		L 0–10	8,999	
*Non-conference game; ^{†}Homecoming; Rankings from AP Poll released prior to the game
