= 1961 Millikin Big Blue football team =

American college football season

1961 Millikin Big Blue football

CCI champion
- Conference: College Conference of Illinois
- Record: 8–0 (7–0 CCI)
- Head coach: Don Shroyer (6th season)
- Captains: Jerry Domescik; Ryan Jorstad
- Home stadium: Millikin Field

1961 College Conference of Illinois football standings
	Conf.					Overall
Team	W		L		T	W		L		T
No. 14 Millikin $	6	–	0	–	0	8	–	0	–	0
Carroll (WI)	5	–	1	–	0	6	–	3	–	0
Carthage	4	–	2	–	0	7	–	2	–	0
North Central (IL)	3	–	3	–	0	5	–	4	–	0
Augustana (IL)	2	–	4	–	0	5	–	4	–	0
Illinois Wesleyan	1	–	5	–	0	2	–	7	–	0
Lake Forest	0	–	6	–	0	0	–	8	–	0
$ – Conference champion; Rankings from NAIA poll

The 1961 Millikin Big Blue football team was an American football team that represented Millikin University as a member of the College Conference of Illinois during the 1961 college football season. In their sixth and final year under head coach Don Shroyer, the Big Blue compiled a perfect 8–0 record (6–0 against conference opponents), won the CCI championship, and outscored opponents by a total of 305 to 79. Millikin was ranked 14th in the final National Association of Intercollegiate Athletics (NAIA) poll. The 1961 campaign was one of only four undefeated seasons in Millikin football history.

Senior halfback and co-captain Jerry Domescik rushed for 799 yards, scored 20 touchdowns, and led the NAIA with 120 points scored. He was also named to the 1961 NAIA All-America team.

Six Milliken players were named to the 1961 All-CCI football team: Domescik; Ryan Jorstad (offensive and defensive tackle); Bob Martin (offensive tackle); Bill Severino (offensive and defensive guard); Chuck Siebel (defensive end); Delmar Rutz (defensive halfback).

== Schedule ==
Date	Opponent	Site	Result	Attendance	Source
September 23	at Illinois State Normal*	McCormick Field; Normal, IL	W 22–0	1,000	
September 30	Carthage	Millikin Field; Decatur, IL	W 32–30		
October 7	North Park*	Millikin Field; Decatur, IL	W 72–0		
October 14	at Augustana (IL)	Rock Island, IL	W 39–7		
October 21	Lake Forest^{†}	Millikin Field; Decatur, IL	W 47–7	3,000	
October 28	at Illinois Wesleyan	IWU Stadium; Bloomington, IL	W 27–16		
November 4	North Central (IL)	Millikin Field; Decatur, IL	W 19–0		
November 11	at Carroll (WI)	Haertel Field; Waukesha, WI	W 47–13		
*Non-conference game; ^{†}Homecoming
