= Assabe and Sabina =

- Genre: Comedy
- Running time: 15 minutes per episode
- Country of origin: United States
- Home station: WSAN
- Starring: Harry Hess Reichard, Paul R. Wieand
- Created by: Lloyd A. Moll
- Written by: Lloyd A. Moll, the Rev. Clarence R. Rahn
- Original release: 1944 – 1955

Assabe and Sabina was a regionally popular Pennsylvania German dialect radio program that was broadcast from radio station WSAN in Allentown, Pennsylvania from 1944 until 1955.

The show centered on the relationship between Der Assabe Mumbauer, a Pennsylvania German farmer, and his wife, Die Sabina Mumbauer. The character of Assabe was a "humorous prankster who frequently was in difficulty with his wife or with his neighbors."

== History ==
Lloyd A. Moll created the program, and played the role of Der Assabe until his death, just a few weeks after the show's launch. Dr. Harry Hess Reichard, professor of German at Muhlenberg College and noted Pennsylvania German scholar, then assumed the role of Assabe. Paul R. Wieand, a local teacher, author and writer of dialect plays, played the role of Die Sabina, Assabe's wife.

The show was first broadcast on January 16, 1944, and ran until 1955. It ran each Sunday, from 1:00 p.m. to 1:15 p.m.

After Moll's death, scripts were written by the Rev. Clarence R. Rahn. These scripts were archived in the Shadek-Fackenthal Library of Franklin & Marshall College in Lancaster, but are currently in the collection of the Evangelical and Reformed Historical Society at Lancaster Theological Seminary. A larger collection of Assabe and Sabina scripts is at Muhlenberg College.

== Cultural influence ==
Assabe and Sabina was extremely popular amongst the Pennsylvania German-speaking populations of Lehigh and Northampton counties, and thousands listened to the program weekly. The show served to sustain interest in Pennsylvania German language and culture in the period during, and immediately after, World War II.

== See also ==
- List of US radio programs
