= Garrett Wilson (ice hockey) =

Canadian ice hockey player (born 1991)

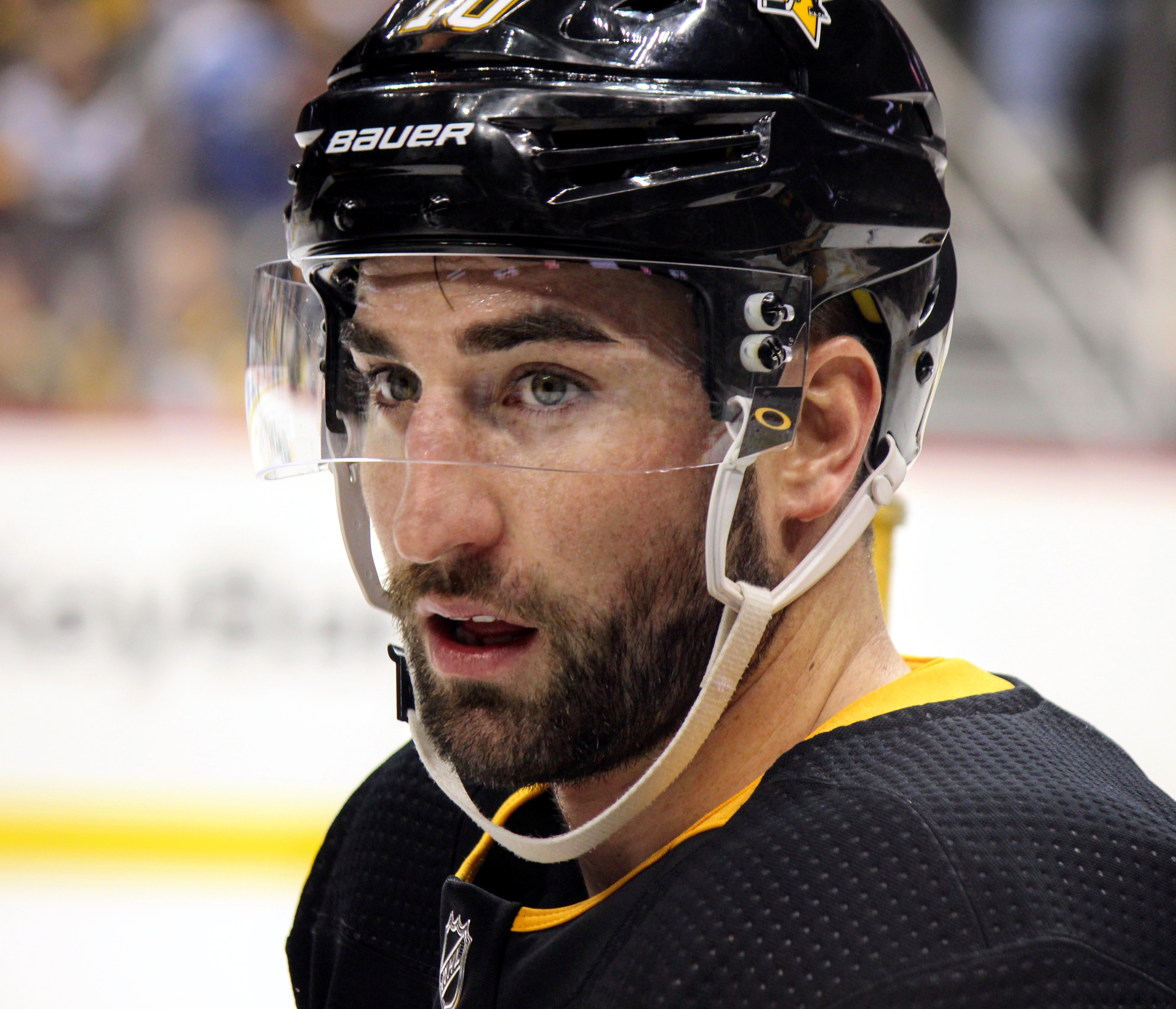
- Wilson with the Pittsburgh Penguins in 2018
- Born: March 16, 1991 (age 35) Elmvale, Ontario, Canada
- Height: 6 ft 2 in (188 cm)
- Weight: 201 lb (91 kg; 14 st 5 lb)
- Position: Left wing
- Shoots: Left
- NHL team (P) Cur. team Former teams: Philadelphia Flyers; Lehigh Valley Phantoms (AHL); Florida Panthers; Pittsburgh Penguins
- NHL draft: 107th overall, 2009; Florida Panthers
- Playing career: 2011–present

Garrett Wilson (born March 16, 1991) is a Canadian professional ice hockey winger and captain of the Lehigh Valley Phantoms of the American Hockey League (AHL) while under contract to the Philadelphia Flyers of the National Hockey League (NHL). Wilson was selected by the Florida Panthers in the 4th round (107th overall) of the 2009 NHL Entry Draft. Today, he is known as an enforcer and has been often referred to by the nickname, “Sheriff.”

== Early life ==
Wilson was born in Elmvale, Ontario. He played major junior hockey in the Ontario Hockey League, and competed for the 2011 Memorial Cup as a member of the Owen Sound Attack. His play during the 2010–11 OHL season was recognized when he was named to the OHL First All-Star Team.

== Playing career ==
On June 1, 2011, the Florida Panthers of the National Hockey League signed Wilson to an entry-level contract.

In the 2015–16 season, Wilson split the year between the Panthers and AHL affiliate, the Portland Pirates. Wilson was scoreless in a career-best 29 games with Florida. He registered his first NHL point in the post-season, assisting Alex Petrovic's game-winning goal in Game 4 against the New York Islanders.

At the conclusion of the season, Wilson was not offered a contract to remain with the Panthers. On July 7, 2016, he signed as a free agent to a one-year, two-way contract with the Stanley Cup champions, the Pittsburgh Penguins. Wilson joined the Penguins AHL affiliate, the Wilkes-Barre/Scranton Penguins, where he was named an alternate captain. He re-signed with the Penguins on July 1, 2017.

Wilson began the 2018–19 season in the AHL where he was named the captain of the Wilkes-Barre/Scranton Penguins. He was recalled to the Penguins on November 6 but after going pointless in four games he was assigned to Wilkes-Barre/Scranton. Wilson scored his first NHL career goal on February 9, 2019 against the Tampa Bay Lightning.

As a free agent from the Penguins, Wilson agreed to a one-year, $725,000 contract with the Toronto Maple Leafs on July 23, 2019. After attending the Maple Leafs 2019 training camp, Wilson was re-assigned for the duration of the 2019–20 season, to play in the AHL with the Toronto Marlies.

As a free agent heading into the pandemic delayed 2020–21 season, Wilson was signed to a one-year AHL contract with the Lehigh Valley Phantoms, affiliate to the Philadelphia Flyers, on January 26, 2021.

Wilson signed a one-year contract to remain with the Phantoms on July 15, 2025. Approaching the NHL trade deadline in the 2025–26 season, Wilson was signed to a two-way NHL contract with the Flyers on March 5, 2026. On March 19, 2026, Wilson made his debut for the Flyers against the Los Angeles Kings, nearly seven years since his last NHL game on April 16, 2019. He was subsequently named as the Flyers' nominee for the Bill Masterton Memorial Trophy.

On July 22, 2026, Wilson signed a one-year AHL contract with the Phantoms. Two months later, Wilson was re-signed by the Flyers to a one-year, two-way contract.

== Career statistics ==
			Regular season					Playoffs
Season	Team	League	GP	G	A	Pts	PIM	GP	G	A	Pts	PIM
2007–08	Tecumseh Chiefs	WOHL	46	11	26	37	40	14	13	8	21	22
2007–08	Windsor Spitfires	OHL	7	1	0	1	2	3	0	0	0	0
2008–09	Owen Sound Attack	OHL	53	17	18	35	44	4	1	3	4	7
2009–10	Owen Sound Attack	OHL	65	36	26	62	80	—	—	—	—	—
2010–11	Owen Sound Attack	OHL	66	40	46	86	114	22	11	10	21	28
2011–12	Cincinnati Cyclones	ECHL	63	17	18	35	50	—	—	—	—	—
2011–12	San Antonio Rampage	AHL	11	1	0	1	2	—	—	—	—	—
2012–13	Cincinnati Cyclones	ECHL	38	19	10	29	56	15	4	1	5	17
2012–13	San Antonio Rampage	AHL	26	3	2	5	19	—	—	—	—	—
2013–14	San Antonio Rampage	AHL	71	14	16	30	58	—	—	—	—	—
2013–14	Florida Panthers	NHL	3	0	0	0	0	—	—	—	—	—
2014–15	San Antonio Rampage	AHL	71	23	15	38	80	3	0	2	2	2
2014–15	Florida Panthers	NHL	2	0	0	0	0	—	—	—	—	—
2015–16	Portland Pirates	AHL	37	7	13	20	55	—	—	—	—	—
2015–16	Florida Panthers	NHL	29	0	0	0	24	6	0	1	1	4
2016–17	Wilkes-Barre/Scranton Penguins	AHL	59	11	20	31	83	5	0	2	2	0
2017–18	Wilkes-Barre/Scranton Penguins	AHL	69	17	25	42	139	3	0	1	1	22
2018–19	Wilkes-Barre/Scranton Penguins	AHL	18	8	10	18	69	—	—	—	—	—
2018–19	Pittsburgh Penguins	NHL	50	2	6	8	18	4	1	0	1	0
2019–20	Toronto Marlies	AHL	51	10	10	20	81	—	—	—	—	—
2020–21	Lehigh Valley Phantoms	AHL	27	1	8	9	28	—	—	—	—	—
2021–22	Lehigh Valley Phantoms	AHL	70	17	16	33	115	—	—	—	—	—
2022–23	Lehigh Valley Phantoms	AHL	68	18	25	43	195	3	0	1	1	6
2023–24	Lehigh Valley Phantoms	AHL	59	8	11	19	216	6	1	0	1	4
2024–25	Lehigh Valley Phantoms	AHL	63	14	14	28	134	7	1	1	2	29
2025–26	Lehigh Valley Phantoms	AHL	54	4	12	16	101	—	—	—	—	—
2025–26	Philadelphia Flyers	NHL	3	0	0	0	5	—	—	—	—	—
NHL totals			87	2	6	8	47	10	1	1	2	4

== Awards and honours ==
Award	Year
OHL
First All-Star Team	2010–11

Awards and achievements
Preceded by Tom Kostopoulos	Captain of the Wilkes-Barre/Scranton Penguins; 2018	Succeeded by David Warsofsky
