= 1955 Missouri Tigers football team =

American college football season

1955 Missouri Tigers football
- Conference: Big Seven Conference
- Record: 1–9 (1–5 Big 7)
- Head coach: Don Faurot (18th season)
- Home stadium: Memorial Stadium

1955 Big Seven Conference football standings
	Conf.					Overall
Team	W		L		T	W		L		T
No. 1 Oklahoma $	6	–	0	–	0	11	–	0	–	0
Nebraska	5	–	1	–	0	5	–	5	–	0
Colorado	3	–	3	–	0	6	–	4	–	0
Kansas State	3	–	3	–	0	4	–	6	–	0
Kansas	1	–	4	–	1	3	–	6	–	1
Iowa State	1	–	4	–	1	1	–	7	–	1
Missouri	1	–	5	–	0	1	–	9	–	0
$ – Conference champion; Rankings from AP Poll

The 1955 Missouri Tigers football team was an American football team that represented the University of Missouri in the Big Seven Conference (Big 7) during the 1955 college football season. The team compiled a 1–9 record (1–5 against Big 7 opponents), finished in a tie for seventh place in the Big 7, and was outscored by its opponents by a combined total of 192 to 92. Don Faurot was the head coach for the 18th of 19 seasons. The team played its home games at Memorial Stadium in Columbia, Missouri.

The team's statistical leaders included Loyd Roll with 432 rushing yards, Dave Doane with 774 passing yards and 709 yards of total offense, Harold Burnine with 594 receiving yards, and Jim Hunter and Joe Wynn, each with 18 points scored.

== Schedule ==
Date	Opponent	Site	Result	Attendance	Source
September 17	No. 5 Maryland*	Memorial Stadium; Columbia, MO	L 12–13	18,000	
September 24	at No. 4 Michigan*	Michigan Stadium; Ann Arbor, MI	L 7–42	51,801	
October 1	Utah*	Memorial Stadium; Columbia, MO	L 14–20	23,000	
October 7	at SMU*	Cotton Bowl; Dallas, TX	L 6–13	25,000	
October 15	at Iowa State	Clyde Williams Field; Ames, IA (rivalry)	L 14–20	8,314	
October 22	Nebraska	Memorial Stadium; Columbia, MO (rivalry)	L 12–18	25,300	
October 29	at Colorado	Folsom Field; Boulder, CO	W 20–12	30,000	
November 5	No. 2 Oklahoma	Memorial Stadium; Columbia, MO (rivalry)	L 0–20	32,289	
November 12	Kansas State	Memorial Stadium; Columbia, MO	L 0–21		
November 19	at Kansas	Memorial Stadium; Lawrence, KS (Border War)	L 7–13	30,000	
*Non-conference game; Rankings from AP Poll released prior to the game
