= WSAN =

- Allentown, Pennsylvania; United States
- Broadcast area: Lehigh Valley
- Frequency: 1470 kHz
- Branding: Real Oldies 1470

Programming
- Language: English
- Format: Oldies
- Affiliations: Premiere Networks

Ownership
- Owner: iHeartMedia; (iHM Licenses, LLC)
- Sister stations: WAEB; WAEB-FM; WZZO

History
- First air date: May 24, 1923
- Former call signs: WSAN (1923–1985); WXKW (1985–1995); WKAP (1995–2006); WYHM (2006–2007)

Technical information
- Licensing authority: FCC
- Facility ID: 18233
- Class: B
- Power: 5,000 watts
- Transmitter coordinates: 40°38′13″N 75°29′2.5″W

Links
- Public license information: Public file; LMS
- Webcast: Listen live
- Website: realoldies1470.iheart.com

WSAN (1470 AM, "Real Oldies 1470") is a commercial radio station licensed to Allentown, Pennsylvania. It is owned by iHeartMedia and serves the Lehigh Valley radio market. It broadcasts an oldies radio format, with its studios and offices in the iHeart Broadcasting Center in Whitehall Township. It is the oldest station in the Lehigh Valley.

WSAN operates with 5,000 watts, non-directional by day but using a directional antenna at night. The transmitter site is near the Whitehall Plaza.

== Programming ==
WSAN is the radio outlet for the Lehigh Valley Phantoms AHL hockey team, whose home arena is PPL Center in downtown Allentown.

== History ==
=== 20th century ===
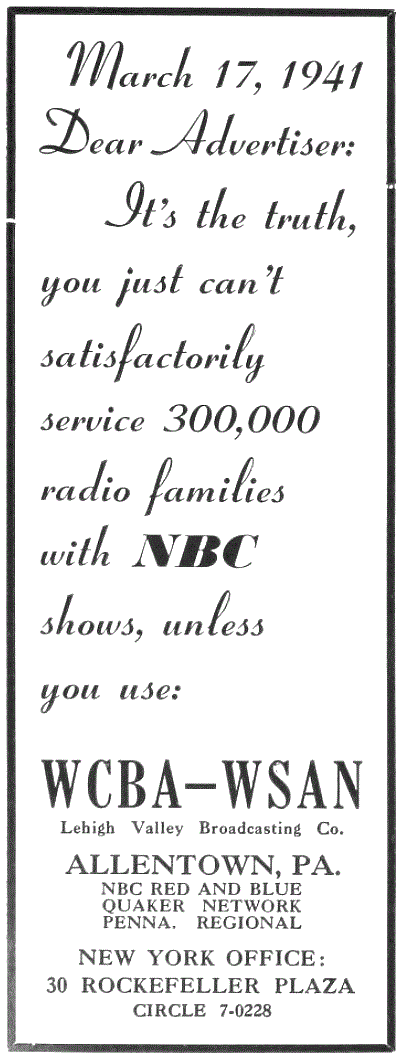
Until early 1941, operations were conducted jointly under the dual WCBA-WSAN call letters.

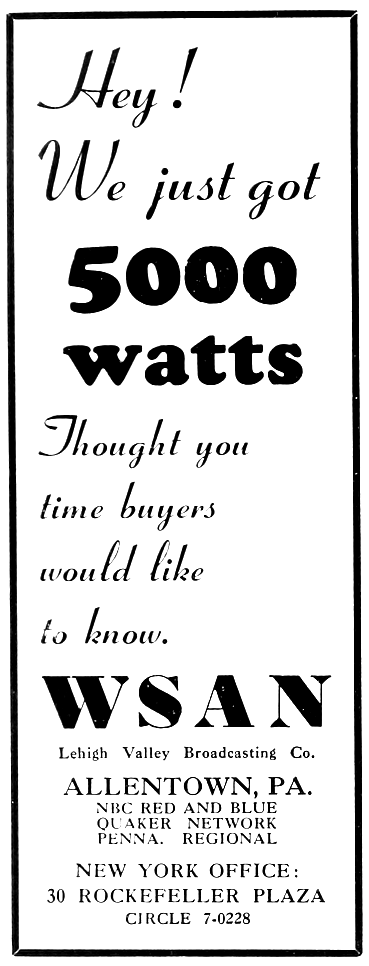
In 1941, the station began operating fulltime as just WSAN, and the approved upgrade to 5,000 watts was completed six years later, in 1947.

This station traces its history to the 1923 merging of WCBA and WSAN in Allentown. WCBA's first license was issued on May 24, 1923, and is cited as the date of the station's founding. WCBA was first licensed to Charles W. Heimbach at his home at 1015 Allen Street in Allentown, which was also the location of Heimbach's Camegraph Repair Shop. The station was assigned to 1070 kHz, with a power of 5 watts, and the call letters were randomly assigned from a sequential roster of available call signs. In late 1924, WCBA was reassigned to 1180 kHz.

WSAN received its first license on June 30, 1923, issued to the Allentown Radio Club for 10 watts on 1310 kHz. Its call sign was also randomly assigned from the roster of available call letters. On November 27, 1923, the club began broadcasting using facilities constructed on the third floor of the former Morning Call building at Sixth and Linden streets. WSAN was deleted on August 7, 1924, but then relicensed, on December 10, 1924, to the Allentown Call Publishing Company, again with 10 watts on 1310 kHz.

On June 15, 1927, both WCBA and WSAN were assigned to 1350 kHz, on a time-sharing basis. On February 15, 1928, WCBA was sold to Reverend B. Bryan Musselman, pastor of Bethel Mennonite Brethren in Christ Church. On November 11, 1928, under the provisions of the Federal Radio Commission's General Order 40, the two stations were initially reassigned to 1500 kHz, which was soon changed to 1440 kHz. On January 15, 1931, the jointly operated stations opened new studios at 39-41 North 10th Street.

In early 1937, an application was filed to formally consolidate the two stations under the WSAN call sign, to be owned by a new corporation, WSAN, Inc., with the Allentown Call Publishing Company holding 60 percent of the stock, and B. Bryan Musselman holding the remaining 40 percent. This would result in common ownership of Allentown's only radio station and daily newspaper. The Federal Communications Commission (FCC) was increasingly concerned about media concentration, and initially scheduled hearings to review the proposal, which were later canceled, with the commission instead launching in March 1941 a general policy review of common newspaper and radio station ownership in a single community.

Also in March 1941, with the North American Regional Broadcasting Agreement (NARBA) going into effect, stations on 1440 kHz, including WCBA and WSAN, moved to 1470 kHz.

On April 2, 1941, an application to increase power from 500 to 5,000 watts at a shared transmitter site was granted. Construction was delayed due to equipment shortages during World War II, so the power increase, which included a nighttime three-tower directional antenna, did not go into service until late 1947.

At the same time the power increase application was approved, the FCC directed that instead of the dual call letters, the station should identify itself as just WSAN. However, WCBA remained a licensed station, with the Allentown Call Publishing Company owning 65%, and manager B. Bryan Musselman holding the other 35%, of the two stations.

The ownership structure became an additional issue, after the FCC adopted its duopoly rule in August 1941, which restricted licensees from owning more than one radio station in a given market. On February 29, 1944, both the newspaper ownership and the duopoly issues were resolved when the FCC approved the transfer of 495 shares (76.98 percent) of Lehigh Valley Broadcasting Company, licensee of both WSAN and WCBA, from the Allentown Call Publishing Company to a local group. At the same time, WSAN was assigned unlimited hours of operation, and the WCBA call letters deleted.

In 1947, WSAN-FM was added, originally on 95.9 MHz. It later moved to 99.9 MHz, and was deleted in 1956, which allowed The Easton Express newspaper to move WEEX-FM, powered at 1,000 watts on 98.3 MHz, to 99.9 MHz, where it could increase its power to 16,000 watts.

Assabe and Sabina, a popular Pennsylvania Dutch dialect radio program, was broadcast on WSAN from 1944 to 1955. Through the 1930s, 1940s, and 1950s, WSAN was an NBC Red Network affiliate, airing its schedule of dramas, comedies, news, sports, soap operas, game shows and big band broadcasts during the "Golden Age of Radio". As network programming moved from radio to television, WSAN began airing a full service middle of the road (MOR) format of music, talk and information, in the 1950s and '60s.

The station made a bold move in the 1970s. Through most of the decade, WSAN was a rare progressive rock outlet on the AM dial, even though the format was found mostly on FM stations, which could play the music in stereophonic sound. (The only other AM progressive station was KSAN in San Francisco. It was a coincidence the two stations had similar call letters.) KSAN ran a Soul Format in the 1950s and 1960s in San Francisco at AM 1450, but the call letters came back to San Francisco in 1968 when Metromedia reclaimed the calls in May 1968. On May 21, 1968, KSAN San Francisco retained the call letters for its San Francisco Stereo Album Rock Affiliate in San Francisco. The formatlasted until November 15, 1980 until Metromedia switched the format to Country and Western Music in San Francisco at 94.9 FM in San Francisco CA..

At the time, four of the five FM stations in Allentown, Bethlehem, and Easton were broadcasting automated easy listening or beautiful music formats, and the fifth was automated adult contemporary. With no rock stations serving the Lehigh Valley radio market at the time, WSAN filled the void.

In 1978, 95.1 WEZV, now WZZO, switched from easy listening to album rock. By the end of the 1970s, WSAN switched to a pop and disco format. Then, as disco faded, WSAN flipped to country music in 1980. By September 1982, it changed to a big band–adult standards format called "Unforgettable". WSAN played the hits of the 1940s, 1950s and 1960s, with a small number of soft rock selections from the 1960s and 1970s.

To draw attention to the change to Unforgettable, WSAN began a promotional contest, offering a modular house to whoever could sit the longest atop a billboard. Dalton Young, Ron Kistler, and Mike MacKay were chosen as the contestants, and they ascended the billboard on September 20, 1982. The three men got worldwide publicity. On day 184, Young was removed from the billboard on charges of dealing marijuana. On June 7, 1983, the remaining two men got down from the billboard after 261 days, on the condition that the game would be declared a tie and both would get houses.

In 1983, still operating as WSAN, the station evolved into more of a popular MOR music format under the catchphrase "Unforgettable II". It expanded to playing the soft hits of the 1950s through the 1980s.

In spring 1985, WXKW at 104.1 FM switched formats from country music to soft adult contemporary, and changed its call sign to WAEB-FM. With no other FM country stations in the Lehigh Valley, WSAN returned to country music and adopted the WXKW call sign.

Station operations were at least partially owned for decades by the Musselman Family, beginning with B. Bryan Musselman's 1928 purchase of WCBA, until 1992, when Holt Broadcasting purchased WXKW. Holt also owned local stations WZZO at 95.1 FM and WKAP at AM 1320. The country music format was maintained until 1993. WXKW then switched to a satellite Oldies format, after WKAP AM 1320 dropped the format to return to easy listening.

In 1996, Holt Broadcasting sold WZZO and WXKW to Capstar, which already owned WAEB and WAEB-FM.

The WKAP call letters and format then moved from AM 1320 to replace WXKW's call sign. WKAP used a Westwood One easy listening format, playing a blend of standards and soft Oldies and adult contemporary songs. Capstar merged with Chancellor Media in 1999, making WKAP 1470 an AM/FM station. At the beginning of 2001, Clear Channel Communications merged with AM/FM. Federal regulations limited the number of Lehigh Valley stations Clear Channel could own. They opted to sell WEEX and WODE to Nassau Broadcasting Partners, and kept WAEB, WAEB-FM, WZZO, and WKAP.

=== 21st century ===
In November 2001, a few days after Oldies 99.9 FM WODE switched to classic rock hits, WKAP switched back to playing Oldies songs from 1955 to 1973. Many of the air staff on WKAP came from WODE when the formats of the two stations changed. The station was popular, since it was the only Oldies music station in the Lehigh Valley, with music from the 1950s, 1960s and early 1970s. This format aired successfully for almost five years.

On September 11, 2006, WKAP ended its Oldies format and adopted a Christian talk and teaching format. With this change, the station took the call sign WYHM, a disambiguation of "Hymn".

The station was still a commercial radio station rather than non-commercial like many Christian outlets. Commercial blocks of time were sold to Christian religious leaders, to host shows and seek donations to their ministries. Some of the Christian programming included Focus on the Family, Insight for Living, Janet Parshall's America, Turning Point and Back to the Bible.

In March 2007, the short-lived experiment with the Christian talk and teaching format ended. The call sign returned to WSAN and the station adopted a sports-talk format, affiliated with Fox Sports Radio. The station added Phillies baseball nearly every evening from the beginning of April through the end of September. Syndicated personalities Mancow, Jim Rome and Phil Hendrie were carried on the station.

Reflecting its previous status an Oldies station, in the winter of 2007 WSAN dropped one of Fox Sports Radio's weekday morning programs in favor of a three-hour Oldies music show.

On May 26, 2016, WSAN flipped from English-language sports to Spanish-language sports as ESPN Deportes Lehigh Valley. The station continued to air English-language broadcasts of Philadelphia Phillies and Lehigh Valley Phantoms games.

On March 13, 2019, the station dropped ESPN Deportes Radio and rebranded as iHeartPodcast AM 1470. Its programming was sourced primarily from podcast programs distributed by iHeartRadio (including HowStuffWorks podcasts such as Stuff You Should Know). WSAN continued to retain the local sports play-by-play rights it held before, including Philadelphia Phillies baseball.

On December 3, 2021, WSAN flipped back to Oldies, branded as "Real Oldies 1470".

== See also ==
- Media in the Lehigh Valley
