= 1955 Iowa State Cyclones football team =

American college football season

1955 Iowa State Cyclones football
- Conference: Big Seven Conference
- Record: 1–7–1 (1–4–1 Big 7)
- Head coach: Vince DiFrancesca (2nd season)
- Captains: Jim McCaulley; Mel Wostoupal
- Home stadium: Clyde Williams Field

1955 Big Seven Conference football standings
| | Conf. | | | | | Overall |
| Team | W | | L | | T | W | | L | | T |
|---|---|---|---|---|---|---|---|---|---|---|
| No. 1 Oklahoma $ | 6 | – | 0 | – | 0 | 11 | – | 0 | – | 0 |
| Nebraska | 5 | – | 1 | – | 0 | 5 | – | 5 | – | 0 |
| Colorado | 3 | – | 3 | – | 0 | 6 | – | 4 | – | 0 |
| Kansas State | 3 | – | 3 | – | 0 | 4 | – | 6 | – | 0 |
| Kansas | 1 | – | 4 | – | 1 | 3 | – | 6 | – | 1 |
| Iowa State | 1 | – | 4 | – | 1 | 1 | – | 7 | – | 1 |
| Missouri | 1 | – | 5 | – | 0 | 1 | – | 9 | – | 0 |
$ – Conference champion; Rankings from AP Poll

The 1955 Iowa State Cyclones football team represented Iowa State College of Agricultural and Mechanic Arts (later renamed Iowa State University) in the Big Seven Conference during the 1955 college football season. In their second year under head coach Vince DiFrancesca, the Cyclones compiled a 1–7–1 record (1–4–1 against conference opponents), tied for fifth place in the conference, and were outscored by their opponents by a combined total of 218 to 69. They played their home games at Clyde Williams Field in Ames, Iowa.

The team's regular starting lineup on offense consisted of left end Mel Wostoupal, left tackle Ray Tweetan, left guard Bob Bird, center Grant Blaney, right guard Jim Lyons, right tackle Jim McCaulley, right end Harold Potts, quarterback John Breckenridge, left halfback Gary Lutz, right halfback Brucke Alexander, and fullback Marv Walter. Jim McCaulley and Mel Wostoupal were the team captains.

The team's statistical leaders included Donn Lorenzen with 179 rushing yards, John Breckenridge with 354 passing yards, and Harold Potts with 173 receiving yards and 18 points (three touchdowns). No Iowa State players were selected as first-team all-conference players.

== Schedule ==
| Date | Time | Opponent | Site | Result | Attendance | Source |
|---|---|---|---|---|---|---|
| September 17 | 2:00 pm | Denver* | Clyde Williams Field; Ames, IA | L 7–19 | 12,217–14,000 | |
| October 1 | 12:30 pm | at Illinois* | Memorial Stadium; Champaign, IL | L 0–40 | 45,706 | |
| October 8 | 2:00 pm | at Kansas | Memorial Stadium; Lawrence, KS | T 7–7 | 19,854 | |
| October 15 | 2:00 pm | Missouri | Clyde Williams Field; Ames, IA (rivalry) | W 20–14 | 8,314 | |
| October 22 | 2:00 pm | Kansas State^{†} | Clyde Williams Field; Ames, IA (rivalry) | L 7–9 | 14,740 | |
| October 29 | 8:05 pm | at Drake* | Drake Stadium; Des Moines, IA | L 21–27 | 6,516–8,500 | |
| November 5 | 2:00 pm | Nebraska | Clyde Williams Field; Ames, IA (rivalry) | L 7–10 | 11,237 | |
| November 12 | 2:00 pm | at No. 1 Oklahoma | Owen Field; Norman, OK | L 0–52 | 46,455 | |
| November 19 | 3:00 pm | at Colorado | Folsom Field; Boulder, CO | L 0–40 | 20,780 | |
*Non-conference game; ^{†}Homecoming; Rankings from AP Poll released prior to the game; All times are in Central time
