= 1969 Carthage Redmen football team =

American college football season

1969 Carthage Redmen football

CCIW champion
- Conference: College Conference of Illinois and Wisconsin
- Record: 9–0 (7–0 CCIW)
- Head coach: Art Keller (15th season)

1969 College Conference of Illinois and Wisconsin football standings
	Conf.					Overall
Team	W		L		T	W		L		T
No. 17 Carthage $	7	–	0	–	0	9	–	0	–	0
Augustana (IL)	6	–	1	–	0	7	–	2	–	0
Millikin	4	–	3	–	0	4	–	5	–	0
Elmhurst	3	–	4	–	0	4	–	4	–	0
Carroll (WI)	3	–	4	–	0	4	–	5	–	0
Illinois Wesleyan	3	–	4	–	0	3	–	6	–	0
North Park	2	–	5	–	0	2	–	7	–	0
North Central (IL)	0	–	7	–	0	0	–	9	–	0
$ – Conference champion; Rankings from NAIA poll

The 1969 Carthage Redmen football team was an American football team that represented Carthage College of Kenosha, Wisconsin, as a member of the College Conference of Illinois and Wisconsin (CCIW) during the 1969 NAIA football season. In their 15th season under head coach Art Keller, the Redmen compiled a perfect 9–0 record (7–0 against CCIW opponents) and won the CCIW championship.

Fullback Joe Sobczak and inside linebacker Mike Droese were selected at the end of the season as the team's most valuable players. Sobczak was a linebacker who converted to offense for the 1969 season and gained over 1,000 yards and scored 11 touchdowns. Droese led the team with 147 tackles.

Nine Carthage players were named to the 1969 All-CCIW football team. In addition to Sobczak and Droese, the honorees were center Rich Massat; offensive guard Gary Peterson; offensive tackle Bill Radakovitz; tight end Scott Boren; defensive tackle Dan Cassity; linebacker Frank Rus Jr.; and defensive halfback Dick Laba.

== Schedule ==
Date	Opponent	Site	Result	Attendance	Source
September 20	at Alma*	Alma, MI	W 19–7	4,300	
September 27	Heidelberg*	Kenosha, WI	W 21–18		
October 4	at North Central (IL)	Naperville, IL	W 41–14		
October 11	Augustana (IL)^{†}	Kenosha, WI	W 32–6		
October 18	at Elmhurst	Elmhurst, IL	W 28–6		
October 25	at Millikin	St. Teresa Field; Decatur, IL	W 40–3		
November 1	North Park	Kenosha, WI	W 13–0		
November 8	at Carroll (WI)	Waukesha, WI	W 49–0		
November 15	Illinois Wesleyan	Kenosha, WI	W 35–0		
*Non-conference game; ^{†}Homecoming

== Roster ==
The following players won varsity letters for their participation on the 1969 Carthage football team:

1. Brent Allwardt, freshman
2. Ken Bates, sophomore
3. Scott Boren, end, junior, 6'3", 220 pounds
4. Ray Burandt, freshman
5. Dan Cassity, tackle, sophomore, 6'1", 210 pounds
6. Dave Daubers, junior
7. Craig Deaton, sophomore
8. Keith Deaton, freshman
9. Ronald Denmar, senior
10. Chris Dresch, sophomore
11. Mike Droese, linebacker, junior, 5'10", 180 pounds
12. Jerry Fair, junior
13. Jim Freyensee, end, sophomore, 6'5", 215 pounds
14. Mark Giesne, sophomore
15. Bill Heinkel, junior
16. Ken Heitman, sophomore
17. Bill Hessefort, sophomore
18. Jerry Janson, quarterback, sophomore, 5'10", 165 pounds
19. Ken Johnson, freshman
20. Roger Justman, sophomore
21. Craig Kaney, senior
22. Mel Kemp, freshman
23. Roger Klein, junior
24. Wayne Krzyzanowski, guard, junior, 5'10", 200 pounds
25. Dick Laba, defensive halfback, junior, 5'10", 185 pounds
26. John Lisinski, sophomore
27. Todd Lukaszewski, sophomore
28. Rich Massat, center, junior, 5'11", 200 pounds
29. Ray Matthies, junior
30. Al Mister, freshman
31. Dan Neider, junior
32. Gary Petersen, guard, sophomore, 6'1", 185 pounds
33. Bill Platnitza, sophomore
34. Gary Pleska, freshman
35. Bill Radakovitz, tackle, senior, 6'4", 220 pounds
36. Fred Richter, sophomore
37. Dean Roebken, sophomore
38. Frank Russ, Jr., linebacker, sophomore, 6'2", 195 pounds
39. Gary Salberg, freshman
40. Dan Schmidt, junior
41. Ernie Scott, junior
42. Joe Sobczak, fullback, junior, 5'11", 205 pounds
43. Todd Teske, sophomore
44. Curt Whipple, freshman
45. Jim Williams, junior
