= 1955 Kansas Jayhawks football team =

American college football season

1955 Kansas Jayhawks football
- Conference: Big Seven Conference
- Record: 3–6–1 (1–4–1 Big 7)
- Head coach: Chuck Mather (2nd season)
- Captains: Ralph Moody; Dick Reich
- Home stadium: Memorial Stadium

1955 Big Seven Conference football standings
	Conf.					Overall
Team	W		L		T	W		L		T
No. 1 Oklahoma $	6	–	0	–	0	11	–	0	–	0
Nebraska	5	–	1	–	0	5	–	5	–	0
Colorado	3	–	3	–	0	6	–	4	–	0
Kansas State	3	–	3	–	0	4	–	6	–	0
Kansas	1	–	4	–	1	3	–	6	–	1
Iowa State	1	–	4	–	1	1	–	7	–	1
Missouri	1	–	5	–	0	1	–	9	–	0
$ – Conference champion; Rankings from AP Poll

The 1955 Kansas Jayhawks football team represented the University of Kansas in the Big Seven Conference during the 1955 college football season. In their second season under head coach Chuck Mather, the Jayhawks compiled a 3–6–1 record (1–4–1 against conference opponents), finished tied for fifth in the Big Seven Conference, and were outscored by all opponents by a combined total of 222 to 93. They played their home games at Memorial Stadium in Lawrence, Kansas.

The team's statistical leaders included John Francisco with 459 rushing yards and 24 points scored and Wally Strauch with 498 passing yards. Ralph Moody and Dick Reich were the team captains.

== Schedule ==
Date	Opponent	Site	Result	Attendance	Source
September 17	at TCU*	Amon G. Carter Stadium; Fort Worth, TX	L 14–47	25,000	
September 24	Washington State*	Memorial Stadium; Lawrence, KS	W 13–0	19,000	
October 1	at Colorado	Folsom Field; Boulder, CO	L 0–12	22,500	
October 8	Iowa State	Memorial Stadium; Lawrence, KS	T 7–7	19,854	
October 15	at No. 3 Oklahoma	Owen Field; Norman, OK	L 6–44	39,789	
October 22	SMU*	Memorial Stadium; Lawrence, KS	L 14–33	20,000	
October 29	at Nebraska	Memorial Stadium; Lincoln, NE (rivalry)	L 14–19	31,000	
November 5	Kansas State	Memorial Stadium; Lawrence, KS (rivalry)	L 0–46	26,000	
November 12	Oklahoma A&M*	Memorial Stadium; Lawrence, KS	W 12–7	12,000	
November 19	Missouri^{†}	Memorial Stadium; Lawrence, KS (Border War)	W 13–7	30,000	
*Non-conference game; ^{†}Homecoming; Rankings from AP Poll released prior to the game
