= Janet Parshall =

American broadcaster

Janet Parshall (born 1950) is an American nationally syndicated radio talk show host known for the Christian program In the Market with Janet Parshall, which is broadcast on the Moody Radio network on over 700 stations. She was also the host for the 2004 documentary, George W. Bush: Faith in the White House. Parshall has authored several books.

Parshall is a graduate of Carroll College (now Carroll University), in Waukesha, Wisconsin. She serves on the board of directors and served on the executive committee of the National Religious Broadcasters.

== Biography ==
Janet Parshall, who is married to the Christian lawyer and best-selling fiction writer Craig Parshall, is the daughter of Vince DiFrancesca, an American football player and coach, and of Thora Margaret Paul.

== Writings ==
- Parshall, Janet. Buyer Beware: Finding Truth in the Marketplace of Ideas. Moody Publishers, 2012. ISBN 0802405614
- Parshall, Janet and Sarah Parshall Perry. When the Fairy Dust Settles: A Mother and Her Daughter Discuss What Really Matters. New York: Warner Faith, 2004. ISBN 978-0-446-69317-2
- Parshall, Craig and Janet Parshall. Traveling a Pilgrim's Path: Preparing Your Child to Navigate the Journey of Faith. Wheaton, Ill: Tyndale House Publishers, 2003. ISBN 978-1-58997-048-9
- Parshall, Craig and Janet Parshall. The Light in the City: Why Christians Must Advance and Not Retreat. Thomas Nelson, Harper Collins Christian Publishing, 2000, ASIN: B003RWS622
- Parshall, Janet, and Craig Parshall. Tough Faith. Eugene, Or: Harvest House Publishers, 1999. ISBN 978-1-56507-997-7
