= Nick Wasylik =

American football and baseball player and coach

Biographical details
- Born: October 2, 1916; New York, New York, U.S.
- Died: December 4, 2004 (aged 88); Columbus, Ohio, U.S.

Playing career

Football
- 1935–1937: Ohio State
- 1944–1945: Fort Pierce

Baseball
- 1935–1937: Ohio State
- Position: Quarterback (football)

Coaching career (HC unless noted)

Football
- 1938–1939: St. Clairsville HS (OH)
- 1940–1942: Bucyrus HS (OH)
- 1946: Miami Seahawks (backfield)
- 1947–1952: Colgate (backfield)
- 1953: Baltimore Colts (backfield)
- 1954–1957: St. Clairsville HS (OH)
- 1958–1965: Lake Forest

Baseball
- 1972–1976: Lake Forest

Administrative career (AD unless noted)
- 1959–1973: Lake Forest

Head coaching record
- Overall: 21–39–2 (college football)

Nicholas Joseph Wasylik (October 2, 1916 – December 4, 2004) was an American football and baseball player and coach. He served as the head football coach at Lake Forest College in Lake Forest, Illinois from 1958 and 1965, compiling a record of 21–39–2, and as the school's head baseball coach from 1972 to 1976.

== Head coaching record ==
=== College football ===
Year	Team	Overall	Conference	Standing	Bowl/playoffs
Lake Forest Foresters (College Conference of Illinois) (1958–1962)
1958	Lake Forest	5–3	4–3	T–4th	
1959	Lake Forest	3–5	2–5	T–6th	
1960	Lake Forest	4–3–1	1–3–1	T–5th	
1961	Lake Forest	0–8	0–6	7th	
1962	Lake Forest	0–7	0–7	8th	
Lake Forest Foresters (NCAA College Division independent) (1963–1965)
1963	Lake Forest	2–4–1			
1964	Lake Forest	3–5			
1965	Lake Forest	4–4			
Lake Forest:		21–39–2	7–24–1		
Total:		21–39–2			
