= Don Shroyer =

American football and baseball coach (1926–2013)

Biographical details
- Born: November 24, 1925; Lovington, Illinois, U.S.
- Died: July 7, 2013 (aged 87); Decatur, Illinois, U.S.

Playing career

Football
- 1946–1949: Millikin
- Position: Halfback

Coaching career (HC unless noted)

Football
- 1951–1965: Carmi HS (IL)
- 1956–1961: Millikin
- 1962–1963: St. Louis Cardinals (assistant)
- 1964–1965: Southern Illinois

Baseball
- 1957–1959: Millikin

Head coaching record
- Overall: 32–35–1 (college football); 28–15 (college baseball); 36–11–3 (high school football)

Accomplishments and honors

Championships
- Football; 1 CCI (1961)

Awards
- Football; NAIA Coach of the Year (1961)

Donald Gene Shroyer (November 24, 1925 – July 7, 2013) was an American football and baseball coach. He served as the head football coach at Millikin University in Decatur, Illinois from 1956 to 1961 and at Southern Illinois University Carbondale from 1964 to 1965, compiling a career college football coaching record of 32–35–1. Shroyer was also the head baseball coach at Millikin from 1957 to 1959, tallying a mark of 28–15. From 1962 to 1963, he was an assistant coach for St. Louis Cardinals of the National Football League (NFL).

== Playing career ==
As a player at Millikin University, Shroyer was all-conference halfback in football for three consecutive years and all-conference champion in track in the broad jump.

== Coaching career ==
=== Millikin ===
After a brief stint in the high school ranks, Shoyer returned to his alma mater, Millikin University, for his first college head coaching job and led the team from 1956 until 1961, accumulating a record of 28–19–1 with an undefeated season in 1961.

=== Southern Illinois ===
After Millikin, Shoyer became the tenth head football coach at Southern Illinois University Carbondale and he held that position for two seasons, from 1964 until 1965. His record at Southern Illinois was 4–16.

== Head coaching record ==
=== College football ===
| Year | Team | Overall | Conference | Standing | Bowl/playoffs |
|---|---|---|---|---|---|
Millikin Big Blue (College Conference of Illinois) (1956–1961)
| 1956 | Millikin | 6–2 | 6–1 | 2nd | |
| 1967 | Millikin | 4–3–1 | 4–2–1 | 4th | |
| 1958 | Millikin | 2–6 | 2–5 | 6th | |
| 1959 | Millikin | 2–6 | 2–5 | T–6th | |
| 1960 | Millikin | 6–2 | 3–2 | T–2nd | |
| 1961 | Millikin | 8–0 | 6–0 | 1st | |
| Millikin: | | 28–19–1 | 23–15–1 | | |
Southern Illinois Salukis (NCAA College Division independent) (1964–1965)
| 1964 | Southern Illinois | 2–8 | | | |
| 1965 | Southern Illinois | 2–8 | | | |
| Southern Illinois: | | 4–16 | | | |
| Total: | | 32–35–1 | | | |
National championship Conference title Conference division title or championship game berth
