= WAEB-FM =

Radio station in Allentown, Pennsylvania

- Allentown, Pennsylvania; United States
- Broadcast area: Lehigh Valley
- Frequency: 104.1 MHz (HD Radio)
- Branding: B104

Programming
- Format: Contemporary hit radio
- Affiliations: Premiere Networks

Ownership
- Owner: iHeartMedia; (iHM Licenses, LLC)
- Sister stations: WAEB; WSAN; WZZO

History
- First air date: June 30, 1961; 65 years ago
- Former call signs: WAEB-FM (1961–1970); WXKW (1970–1985)
- Call sign meaning: Allentown-Easton-Bethlehem

Technical information
- Licensing authority: FCC
- Facility ID: 14372
- Class: B
- ERP: 50,000 watts
- HAAT: 152 meters (499 ft)
- Transmitter coordinates: 40°43′13.3″N 75°35′42.6″W
- Translator: See § Translators

Links
- Public license information: Public file; LMS
- Webcast: Listen live (via iHeartRadio); Listen live (HD3)
- Website: b104.iheart.com; www.latinafm.net (HD3)

WAEB-FM (104.1 MHz, "B104") is a commercial radio station licensed to Allentown, Pennsylvania, and serving the Lehigh Valley. The station airs an adult-leaning contemporary hit radio format and is owned by iHeartMedia, Inc. The station's studios and offices are on Alta Drive in Whitehall.

WAEB-FM has an effective radiated power (ERP) of 50,000 watts, the maximum for most Pennsylvania stations. Its transmitter is on Tower Road in Slatington, about 20 miles (32 km) northwest of Allentown. WAEB-FM broadcasts using HD Radio technology.

== History ==
=== Early years ===
WAEB-FM signed on the air on June 30, 1961. It debuted as the sister station of WAEB (790 AM), simulcasting its Top 40 format in its first few years. In the late 1960s, WAEB-FM separated its programming from WAEB and aired an automated beautiful music format, playing quarter-hour sweeps of soft instrumental music. It went through several more formats before eventually becoming a country music station in 1970 with the call sign WXKW.

In April 1985, it returned to the WAEB-FM call letters and switched to a soft adult contemporary format, initially playing a few middle of the road (MOR) artists as well as some new songs. The station was known as "Light 104 WAEB-FM".

By the early part of 1986, WAEB FM had evolved to more of a mainstream AC format, but by the late part of 1986, the station was phasing out the "Light" name. It became "104 WAEB-FM" with the music mix changing to a dayparted AC/CHR mix without the hype, more adult by day, more youthful at night.

=== Laser 104.1 ===
January 26, 1987, was the day when "the records went away". WAEB-FM switched to a CHR-Top 40 format, becoming "The world's first ever laser hit-music radio station, The New Laser 104.1 WAEB-FM". This marked when WAEB-FM began playing 90% percent of its music from compact discs or CDs.

In 1991, the station gradually replaced the "Laser 104.1" branding by simply calling the station "104.1 WAEB-FM".

The station began calling itself "The New B104 FM" in 1992. By late 1992, WAEB-FM started to play down the fact that the station was "new" and began positioning itself as playing "10 songs in a row".

=== Going softer ===
By spring 1996, B104 began moving softer. By 1997, B104 began playing softer songs during the day. In late 1998, B104 began using a new jingle package and streaming on the web.

In the 1990s, B104 served as Allentown's de facto adult contemporary station as it eliminated rap and hard rock during the day. Through the 2000s, B104 had "whatever weekends", moving the station closer to adult hits and away from playing the week's top hits frequently.

In 2000, WAEB-FM and WAEB became part of AMFM Broadcasting.

=== Return to mainstream top 40 ===
In 2006, B104 was re-imaged again, as WAEB-FM began to resemble other CHR-Top 40 stations owned by Clear Channel. Today, B104 is a mainstream CHR that no longer dayparts its music. B104 relies on syndicated shows from co-owned Premiere Networks and voicetracked DJs from other iHeart stations most of the day.

2026 saw many changes for B104 as dominant morning show hosts Mike Kelly & Becca Lynn got laid off as part of mass layoffs at the station's parent company, iHeartMedia. They were replaced that July with Andi & Bob, based out of sister station WRFY (Y102) in Reading. As well, WAEB's HD3 subchannel "Latina FM" quietly shut down that summer after 9 years of airing spanish contemporary hit music.

=== Short-spaced signal ===
WAEB-FM is short-spaced to WNNK-FM Wink 104 in Harrisburg, Pennsylvania, owned by Cumulus Media. Both stations operate on the same 104.1 MHz channel even though the distance between the stations' transmitters is only 76 miles (122 km).

The minimum distance between two Class B stations operating on the same channel according to current Federal Communications Commission (FCC) rules should be 150 miles (240 km). Both stations are grandfathered because they went on the air before the FCC rules were established.

== HD subchannels and translators ==
WAEB-FM broadcasts using HD Radio technology.

The station's HD3 subchannel, "Latina FM", aired a Spanish contemporary hit radio format and fed FM translators in Allentown, Reading and Hazleton. Latina FM quietly shut down in 2026. W221CU 106.5 in Allentown and W296CL 107.5 in Reading had been airing a Spanish CHR format since May 2017.

Broadcast translators for WAEB-FM-HD3
Call sign	Frequency	City of license	FID	ERP (W)	HAAT	Class	Transmitter coordinates	FCC info
W293BW	106.5 FM	Allentown, Pennsylvania	157515	250	0 m (0 ft)	D	40°39′30.3″N 75°25′10.7″W	LMS
W296CL	107.1 FM	Reading, Pennsylvania	151079	10	240 m (787 ft)	D	40°21′15.3″N 75°53′53.7″W	LMS
W300BT	107.9 FM	Hazleton, Pennsylvania	156246	18.6	174 m (571 ft)	D	40°58′9.3″N 75°57′26.7″W	LMS

== See also ==
- Media in the Lehigh Valley
