= 1961 Carroll Pioneers football team =

American college football season

1961 Carroll Pioneers football
- Conference: College Conference of Illinois
- Record: 6–3 (5–1 CCI)
- Head coach: Vince DiFrancesca (3rd season)
- Home stadium: Haertel Field

1961 College Conference of Illinois football standings
	Conf.					Overall
Team	W		L		T	W		L		T
No. 14 Millikin $	6	–	0	–	0	8	–	0	–	0
Carroll (WI)	5	–	1	–	0	6	–	3	–	0
Carthage	4	–	2	–	0	7	–	2	–	0
North Central (IL)	3	–	3	–	0	5	–	4	–	0
Augustana (IL)	2	–	4	–	0	5	–	4	–	0
Illinois Wesleyan	1	–	5	–	0	2	–	7	–	0
Lake Forest	0	–	6	–	0	0	–	8	–	0
$ – Conference champion; Rankings from NAIA poll

The 1961 Carroll Pioneers football team was an American football team that represented Carroll College (now known as Carroll University) of Waukesha, Wisconsin, as a member of the College Conference of Illinois (CCI) during the 1961 college football season. In their third season under head coach Vince DiFrancesca, the Pioneers compiled a 6–3 record (5–1 in CCI games), finished in second place in the CCI, and were outscored by a total of 174 to 157.

The team tallied 2,121 yards of total offense (235 yards per game), consisting of 1,192 rushing yards and 929 passing yards. On defense, the Pioneers gave up 2,461 yards (273 yards per game) to opponents.

Halfback Ken Hill led the team with 785 rushing yards and 795 yards of total offense. End John Budde led the team with 420 receiving yards and 48 points scored (seven touchdowns, six extra points). Quarterback John Davis tallied 652 passing yards.

Four Carroll players were named to the 1961 All-CCI football team: halfback Ken Hill; end John Budde; linebacker Doug Donoho; and defensive halfback Don Natalizio. Budde received third-team honors on the 1961 Little All-America college football team. Hill was the only Carroll players named to the 1961 Wisconsin collegiate all-state team; Hill was named to the second team as a halfback.

The team played its home games at Haertel Field in Waukesha.

== Schedule ==
Date	Opponent	Site	Result	Attendance	Source
September 16	at Whitewater State*	Whitewater, WI	L 6–28		
September 23	Carthage	Haertel Field; Waukesha, WI	W 19–6		
September 30	at North Park*	Chicago, IL	W 19–13		
October 7	Augustana (IL)	Haertel Field; Waukesha, WI	W 21–14		
October 14	at Lake Forest	Lake Forest IL	W 26–7		
October 21	Illinois Wesleyan^{†}	Haertel Field; Waukesha, WI	W 27–19		
October 28	at North Central (IL)	Naperville, IL	W 19–13		
November 4	at Wheaton (IL)*	McCully Field; Wheaton, IL	L 7–27		
November 11	Millikin	Haertel Field; Waukesha, WI	L 13–47		
*Non-conference game; ^{†}Homecoming
