= 1962 Carthage Redmen football team =

American college football season

1962 Carthage Redmen football

CCI champion
- Conference: College Conference of Illinois
- Record: 8–0 (7–0 CCI)
- Head coach: Art Keller (8th season)

1962 College Conference of Illinois football standings
	Conf.					Overall
Team	W		L		T	W		L		T
Carthage $	7	–	0	–	0	8	–	0	–	0
Carroll (WI)	5	–	2	–	0	6	–	2	–	0
Augustana (IL)	4	–	3	–	0	5	–	4	–	0
Millikin	4	–	3	–	0	4	–	4	–	0
Illinois Wesleyan	4	–	3	–	0	4	–	5	–	0
North Central (IL)	3	–	4	–	0	4	–	5	–	0
North Park	1	–	6	–	0	2	–	6	–	0
Lake Forest	0	–	7	–	0	0	–	7	–	0
$ – Conference champion

The 1962 Carthage Redmen football team was an American football team that represented Carthage College of Kenosha, Wisconsin, as a member of the College Conference of Illinois (CCI) during the 1969 NAIA football season. In their eighth season under head coach Art Keller, the Redmen compiled a perfect 8–0 record (7–0 against CCI opponents), won the CCI championshipand outscored opponents by a total of 303 to 138.

Fullback Ervin Olson received honorable mention on the 1961 Little All-America college football team. He was also selected as the most valuable player in the CCI.

Nine Carthage players were chosen as first-team players on one or both of the 1962 All-CCI and NAIA All-District 20 football teams: fullback Erv Olson (both); halfback Jim Payne (both); quarterback Larry Rinehold (CCI); offensive end Pat Schrader (both); offensive and defensive tackle John Gavurnik (both); offensive tackle and linebacker Gene Schrader (both); defensive end Dave Fink (both); middle guard Dick Snyder (District 20); and linebacker Gary Achepohl (CCI).

During the 1962 season, the college was in the process of moving its campus from Carthage, Illinois, to Kenosha, Wisconsin. The team played its first three home games in Carthage and played its final home game in Kenosha.

== Schedule ==
Date	Opponent	Site	Result	Attendance	Source
September 22	at Graceland*	Lamoni, IA	W 34–20	2,000	
September 29	Carroll (WI)	Carthage, IL	W 45–19	1,000	
October 6	Millikin	Carthage, IL	W 25–20	1,000	
October 13	at North Park	North Park Field; Chicago, IL	W 41–6	3,000	
October 20	North Central (IL)	Carthage, IL	W 47–26	1,500	
October 27	at Illinois Wesleyan	Bloomington, IL	W 28–7	3,000	
November 3	Lake Forest	Lakefront Stadium; Kenosha, WI	W 48–13	1,500–3,000	
November 10	at Augustana (IL)	Ericson Field; Rock Island, IL	W 35–27	2,000	
*Non-conference game
