= Art Keller =

American football, basketball, and baseball coach

- Keller pictured in the Crimson Rambler 1973, Carthage yearbook

Biographical details
- Born: June 11, 1921
- Died: February 3, 1990 (aged 68); Racine, Wisconsin, U.S.

Coaching career (HC unless noted)

Football
- 1945–1951: Carthage HS (IL)
- 1952–1982: Carthage

Basketball
- 1945–1952: Carthage HS (IL)
- 1952–1958: Carthage

Baseball
- 1955–1956: Carthage

Head coaching record
- Overall: 177–87–7 (college football); 53–90 (college basketball); 11–15 (college baseball)
- Tournaments: Football; 0–1–1 (NAIA D-II playoffs)

Accomplishments and honors

Championships
- Football; 8 CCI/CCIW (1962–1963, 1967, 1969–1973)

Arthur T. Keller (June 11, 1921 – February 3, 1990) was an American football, basketball, and baseball coach. He was the head football coach at Carthage College in Carthage, Illinois and Kenosha, Wisconsin, serving for 31 seasons, from 1952 until 1982, and compiling a record of 177–87–7. His team had a 19-game winning streak from 1961 to 1963, the longest in the country at the time. Carthage named its football stadium "Keller Field" in his honor.

Keller died at the age of 68 in Racine, Wisconsin.

== Head coaching record ==
=== College football ===
Year	Team	Overall	Conference	Standing	Bowl/playoffs
Carthage Redmen (NCAA College Division independent) (1952–1960)
1952	Carthage	5–2			
1953	Carthage	8–1			
1954	Carthage	5–3			
1955	Carthage	6–2			
1956	Carthage	8–2			
1957	Carthage	4–3–1			
1958	Carthage	7–2			
1959	Carthage	5–3–1			
1960	Carthage	5–4			
Carthage Redmen (College Conference of Illinois / College Conference of Illinois and Wisconsin) (1961–1982)
1961	Carthage	7–2	4–2	3rd	
1962	Carthage	8–0	7–0	1st	
1963	Carthage	6–1–1	4–1–1	1st	
1964	Carthage	4–4	4–2	3rd	
1965	Carthage	6–2	5–1	2nd	
1966	Carthage	6–2	4–2	T–2nd	
1967	Carthage	7–1	6–0	1st	
1968	Carthage	4–5	4–3	T–4th	
1969	Carthage	9–0	7–0	1st	
1970	Carthage	7–1–1	7–0–1	1st	
1971	Carthage	9–0–1	8–0	1st	T NAIA Division II Semifinal
1972	Carthage	8–1	7–0	1st	
1973	Carthage	8–2	8–0	1st	L NAIA Division II Semifinal
1974	Carthage	5–3–1	4–3–1	T–4th	
1975	Carthage	4–5	3–5	7th	
1976	Carthage	3–6	3–5	7th	
1977	Carthage	5–4	4–4	T–4th	
1978	Carthage	1–8	1–7	8th	
1979	Carthage	0–8–1	0–8	9th	
1980	Carthage	6–3	5–3	T–3rd	
1981	Carthage	7–2	6–2	3rd	
1982	Carthage	4–5	4–4	T–5th	
Carthage:		177–87–7	105–52–3		
Total:		177–87–7			
National championship Conference title Conference division title or championship game berth

== See also ==
- List of college football coaches with 30 seasons
