= WZZO =

Radio station in Bethlehem, Pennsylvania

- Bethlehem, Pennsylvania; United States
- Broadcast area: Lehigh Valley
- Frequency: 95.1 MHz (HD Radio)
- Branding: 95.1 ZZO

Programming
- Language: English
- Format: Active rock
- Affiliations: iHeartRadio; Premiere Networks

Ownership
- Owner: iHeartMedia; (iHM Licenses, LLC)
- Sister stations: WAEB; WAEB-FM; WSAN

History
- First air date: February 16, 1946; 80 years ago
- Former call signs: WGPA-FM (1946–1973); WEZV (1973–1978)

Technical information
- Licensing authority: FCC
- Facility ID: 14375
- Class: B
- ERP: 30,000 watts
- HAAT: 192 meters (630 ft)
- Transmitter coordinates: 40°37′13.4″N 75°17′35.6″W

Links
- Public license information: Public file; LMS
- Webcast: Listen live (via iHeartRadio)
- Website: 951zzo.iheart.com

WZZO (95.1 FM "95.1 ZZO") is a commercial radio station licensed to Bethlehem, Pennsylvania. Owned by iHeartMedia, the station broadcasts an active rock radio format. Its studio and offices are in the iHeart Broadcasting Complex in Whitehall Township.

WZZO has an effective radiated power (ERP) of 30,000 watts, covering the Lehigh Valley metropolitan region of Pennsylvania and New Jersey. Its transmitter is located off Severn Lane, near Interstate 78 in Lower Saucon Township.

== History ==
=== 20th century ===
WZZO first signed on the air on February 16, 1946, as WGPA-FM, owned and operated by The Express-Times. The broadcast was simulcast during daylight hours with sister station WGPA. The AM 1100 station is authorized by the Federal Communications Commission to broadcast only from sunrise to sunset, so programming continued on FM station until 11 pm. At that time WGPA-FM used a sub-carrier to broadcast instrumental beautiful music from reel-to-reel tapes for playing over paging systems inside retail businesses. Eventually, that same beautiful music sound was airing on WGPA-FM.

In 1973, when WGPA-AM and FM were sold by The Globe-Times to Holt Broadcasting, the new owners changed the FM call sign to WEZV to reflect the FM's easy listening radio format with the EZ in the call letters standing for "Easy" and the V representing "Valley" as in Lehigh Valley.

In 1978, WGPA and WEZV were sold to different owners, and WEZV's call letters changed to WZZO and the format switched to album-oriented rock, which continues to this day.

The broadcast tower remains at its original location off Applebutter Road in Lower Saucon Township and can be spotted from I-78 between the exits for Route 412 and Route 33. The original broadcast studios were at 428 Brodhead Avenue, which now serves as a Lehigh University building in Bethlehem. Before moving to Whitehall Township, the WZZO broadcast studios were located in the Westgate Mall in Bethlehem.

=== 21st century ===
On February 24, 2019, WZZO's Facebook page announced that morning host "The Bearman" had died unexpectedly.

On June 12, 2023, WZZO shifted its format from classic rock to active rock, adding more 90s, 2000s, and current rock into its playlist. The station was not able to overtake WODE-FM in the classic rock format, registering a 4.1 share while rival classic rock WODE-FM is on the top, leading the market with an 11.4 share in the April 2023 Nielsen Audio Ratings.

== Programming ==
WZZO programming from Monday through Friday includes Rover's Morning Glory from WMMS in Cleveland in morning drive time.

In 2008, the Lehigh Valley IronPigs minor league baseball team began broadcasting their games on WZZO.

== See also ==
- Media in the Lehigh Valley
