= Vince DiFrancesca =

American football player and coach (1922–2007)

Biographical details
- Born: January 1, 1922; Melrose Park, Illinois, U.S.
- Died: May 21, 2007 (aged 85); Maurertown, Virginia, U.S.

Playing career

Football
- 1942: Northwestern
- 1944: Galveston AAF
- 1946–1947: Northwestern
- Position: Guard

Coaching career (HC unless noted)

Football
- 1949–1953: Western Illinois
- 1954–1956: Iowa State
- 1959–1971: Carroll (WI)

Golf
- 1960–1972: Carroll (WI)

Administrative career (AD unless noted)
- 1959–1972: Carroll (WI)
- 1972–?: Deerfield HS (IL)

Head coaching record
- Overall: 106–71–7 (football)
- Bowls: 2–0

Accomplishments and honors

Championships
- Football; 1 IIAC (1949)

Vincent DiFrancesca (January 1, 1922 – May 21, 2007) was an American football player and coach. He served as the head football coach at Western Illinois University from 1949 to 1953, Iowa State University from 1954 to 1956, and Carroll College—now known as Carroll University—in Waukesha, Wisconsin from 1959 to 1971, compiling a career college football head coaching record of 106–71–7.

== Playing career ==
DiFrancesca was drafted by the Pittsburgh Steelers in the 31st round of the 1947 NFL draft.

== Coaching career ==
=== Western Illinois ===
DiFrancesca was the head football coach at Western Illinois Leathernecks in Macomb, Illinois and he held that position for five seasons, from 1949 until 1953. His career coaching record at Western Illinois was 38–7–1. Under DiFrancesca's leadership, Western's team was ranked among the best offensive and defensive teams in the nation for five years.

=== Iowa State ===
DiFrancesca was also the head coach at Iowa State University from 1954 to 1956. He was the 21st head coach for the Cyclones. His coaching record at Iowa State was 6–21–1.

=== Carroll (WI) ===
DiFrancesca's final head coaching job was as the 22nd head football coach at Carroll College—now known as Carroll University—in Waukesha, Wisconsin, serving for 13 seasons, from 1959 to 1971. His record at Carroll was 62–43–5.

DiFrancesca also served as Carroll's athletic director and head golf coach until 1972, when he resigned to become the athletic director at Deerfield High School in Deerfield, Illinois. He was inducted into the Carroll College Athletic Hall of Fame in 1994.

== Personal life ==
DiFrancesca was the father of both national radio talkshow host Janet Parshall of Janet Parshall's America and Charlie DiFrancesca, the subject of the book "Charlie Di: The Story of The Legendary Bond Trader", by William D. Fallon.

== Head coaching record ==
=== Football ===
| Year | Team | Overall | Conference | Standing | Bowl/playoffs |
|---|---|---|---|---|---|
Western Illinois Leathernecks (Illinois / Interstate Intercollegiate Athletic Conference) (1949–1953)
| 1949 | Western Illinois | 9–1 | 4–0 | 1st | W Corn |
| 1950 | Western Illinois | 7–1 | 4–1 | 2nd | |
| 1951 | Western Illinois | 7–1–1 | 4–1–1 | 2nd | |
| 1952 | Western Illinois | 7–2 | 5–1 | 2nd | |
| 1953 | Western Illinois | 8–2 | 5–1 | 2nd | W Corn |
| Western Illinois: | | 38–7–1 | 22–4–1 | | |
Iowa State Cyclones (Big Seven Conference) (1954–1956)
| 1954 | Iowa State | 3–6 | 1–5 | 6th | |
| 1955 | Iowa State | 1–7–1 | 1–4–1 | T–5th | |
| 1956 | Iowa State | 2–8 | 0–6 | 7th | |
| Iowa State: | | 6–21–1 | 2–15–1 | | |
Carroll Pioneers (College Conference of Illinois / College Conference of Illinois and Wisconsin) (1959–1971)
| 1959 | Carroll | 5–2–1 | 4–2–1 | 3rd | |
| 1960 | Carroll | 2–5–2 | 1–2–2 | 4th | |
| 1961 | Carroll | 6–3 | 5–1 | 2nd | |
| 1962 | Carroll | 6–2 | 5–2 | 2nd | |
| 1963 | Carroll | 5–4 | 3–3 | 5th | |
| 1964 | Carroll | 3–4–1 | 2–3–1 | T–4th | |
| 1965 | Carroll | 3–4–1 | 1–4–1 | T–5th | |
| 1966 | Carroll | 5–4 | 2–4 | T–5th | |
| 1967 | Carroll | 5–3 | 4–2 | 3rd | |
| 1968 | Carroll | 5–3 | 4–3 | T–4th | |
| 1969 | Carroll | 4–5 | 3–4 | T–4th | |
| 1970 | Carroll | 8–1 | 7–1 | 2nd | |
| 1971 | Carroll | 5–3 | 5–3 | T–2nd | |
| Carroll: | | 62–43–5 | 46–34–5 | | |
| Total: | | 106–71–7 | | | |
National championship Conference title Conference division title or championship game berth
