= WAEB (AM) =

Radio station in Allentown, Pennsylvania

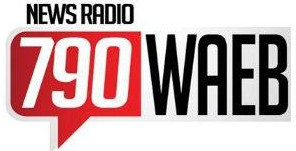
- Allentown, Pennsylvania; United States
- Broadcast area: Lehigh Valley
- Frequency: 790 kHz
- Branding: NewsRadio 790 WAEB

Programming
- Format: Talk radio
- Affiliations: Fox News Radio; Premiere Networks

Ownership
- Owner: iHeartMedia, Inc.; (iHM Licenses, LLC)
- Sister stations: WAEB-FM; WSAN; WZZO

History
- First air date: April 15, 1949
- Call sign meaning: Allentown–Easton–Bethlehem

Technical information
- Licensing authority: FCC
- Facility ID: 14371
- Class: B
- Power: 3,600 watts (day); 1,500 watts (night)
- Transmitter coordinates: 40°39′37.4″N 75°30′48.7″W

Links
- Public license information: Public file; LMS
- Webcast: Listen live (via iHeartRadio)
- Website: 790waeb.iheart.com

WAEB (790 kHz) is a commercial AM radio station licensed to Allentown, Pennsylvania, United States, and serving the Lehigh Valley region of eastern Pennsylvania. It airs a talk format and is owned by iHeartMedia, Inc. The studios and offices are on Alta Drive in Whitehall.

WAEB's transmitter is situated off Church Street near MacArthur Road (Pennsylvania Route 145) in Hokendauqua.

== History ==
=== Top 40 hits ===
WAEB signed on the air on April 15, 1949. It was powered at 500 watts in the daytime and 1,000 watts at night. WAEB was an affiliate of ABC Radio. The studios were at 7th and Hamilton Streets. The call sign refers to the three major cities in the Lehigh Valley: Allentown, Easton and Bethlehem.

The station was sold to Rust Broadcasting in 1957. Under Rust ownership, it began a Top 40 format, playing hit music for the young people of the Lehigh Valley. Its slogan was Music Radio 79 WAEB. (It was a short distance on the AM dial from 770 WABC in New York City.) In 1961, WAEB added an FM sister station, WAEB-FM at 104.1 MHz. For the first few years, both stations simulcast WAEB's Top 40 format. WAEB-FM broke away from the simulcast in the late 1960s, airing an automated beautiful music format.

=== Adult contemporary and talk ===
By the 1980s, young people began to look for their music on the FM dial. That prompted WAEB to evolve into a hot adult contemporary format in 1983. By 1985, it was more of an older-leaning adult contemporary station with plenty of oldies on the playlist. In 1986, WAEB added evening syndicated talk shows, and overnight talk shows were added by 1989; it continued to air a mix of adult contemporary and oldies music during the day.

WAEB and WAEB-FM were sold to CRB Broadcasting in the late 1980s. In 1992, WAEB dropped its remaining music shows and made the transition to a news/talk format.

=== Changes in ownership ===
In 1995, WAEB and WAEB-FM were sold to Capstar along with 95.1 WZZO and 1470 WKAP. The stations all went to AMFM Broadcasting as a result of the Chancellor/Capstar merger in 1999.

AMFM later merged with Clear Channel Communications, which owned WODE-FM and WEEX. That put the company over the limit of stations in could own in the Allentown radio market. Clear Channel was forced to sell an AM and FM station to be under legal ownership limits. Clear Channel gave Nassau Broadcasting cash plus WODE-FM and WEEX in exchange for New Jersey stations WSUS, WNNJ, WNNJ-FM, WHCY, and a local marketing agreements with WDLC, and WTSX. As a result, WAEB, WAEB-FM, WZZO and WKAP became Clear Channel stations.

=== 21st century ===
In January 2007, 1470 AM dropped its oldies format, switching to Christian radio programming with a change in its call letters to WYHM. In response, WAEB launched an Internet radio station playing oldies music on its web site. The oldies format has since returned to 1470, now WSAN.

On September 4, 2009, the northernmost tower mast of the station's five-tower antenna array located in Whitehall Township was toppled when a vandal or vandals cut the tower's guy-wires.

On March 10th, 2026, IHM Licenses, LLC, the owner of WAEB filed an application with the FCC to relocate the transmitter site further south in Whitehall, The proposed facility will be diplexed with WSAN at the 3 tower array in the Whitehall Mall parking lot. If approved, this will reduce the nightime power to 190 watts, but increase the daytime power to 4 kW. Most of the daytime power gain will be negligible due to the shorter tower height of the WSAN array.

== Programming ==
Bobby Gunther Walsh hosts WAEB's local morning program; nationally syndicated conservative talk shows compose the balance of the schedule.

== See also ==
- Media in the Lehigh Valley
