= George Wilson (American football coach) =

American football player and coach (1914–1978)

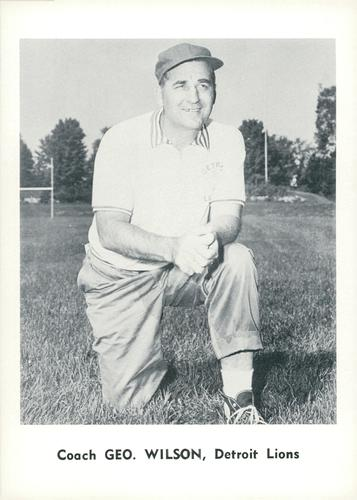

No. 30
- Position: End

Personal information
- Born: February 3, 1914; Chicago, Illinois, U.S.
- Died: November 23, 1978 (aged 64); Detroit, Michigan, U.S.
- Listed height: 6 ft 1 in (1.85 m)
- Listed weight: 199 lb (90 kg)

Career information
- High school: Chicago (IL) Austin; Delafield (WI) St. John’s Northwestern Military Academy
- College: Northwestern
- NFL draft: 1937: undrafted

Career history

Playing
- Chicago Bears (1937–1946)

Coaching
- Chicago Bears (1947–1948) Wide receivers / tight end coach; Detroit Lions (1949–1956) Wide receivers / tight end coach; Detroit Lions (1957–1964) Head coach; Washington Redskins (1965) Wide receivers / tight end coach; Miami Dolphins (1966–1969) Head coach

Awards and highlights
- As a player: 4× NFL champion (1940, 1941, 1943, 1946); First-team All-Pro (1942); Second-team All-Pro (1943); 3× Pro Bowl (1940–1942); As a head coach: NFL champion (1957); NFL Coach of the Year (1957); As an assistant coach: 2× NFL champion (1952, 1953)

Career NFL statistics
- Receptions: 111
- Receiving yards: 1,342
- Touchdowns: 15
- Stats at Pro Football Reference

Head coaching record
- Regular season: 68–84–8 (.450)
- Postseason: 2–0 (1.000)
- Career: 70–84–8 (.457)
- Coaching profile at Pro Football Reference

George William Wilson Sr. (February 3, 1914 – November 23, 1978) was a professional football end for the Chicago Bears and later a coach for the National Football League (NFL)'s Detroit Lions and the American Football League (AFL)'s Miami Dolphins. Wilson attended and played football at Northwestern University. He went undrafted in 1937, before being signed by the Chicago Bears. Wilson played for ten seasons with the Bears, compiling overall record of 111 pass receptions, 1,342 receiving yards, and fifteen touchdowns. He was a member of the Bears during their five appearances in the National Football League Championship Game from 1940 to 1943 and 1946. Additionally, he was selected for the NFL All-Star Game from 1940 to 1942. He also played one season of professional basketball for the Chicago Bruins in 1939–40. Wilson won seven championships combined as a player and coach.

His coaching career began with the Bears in 1947, when he became an assistant coach to George Halas. After just two seasons with Chicago, Wilson left in 1949 for another assistant coaching position with the Detroit Lions, a division rival of the Bears. Prior to the 1957 season, he succeeded Buddy Parker as head coach. In his first year as head coach, Wilson guided Detroit to an 8–4 season and victory in the 1957 NFL Championship Game, the most recent league championship for the Lions. For his efforts, Wilson was awarded the first Associated Press NFL Coach of the Year Award. He remained with the Lions until 1964, though they were unable to replicate their success of 1957. Wilson then served for one year as an assistant coach to the Washington Redskins in 1965. Shortly after the season ended, Miami Dolphins owner Joe Robbie hired Wilson as the first head coach of the new AFL franchise in 1966. His son, George Wilson Jr., was a starting quarterback during the team's first season. Wilson Sr. was unable to obtain a winning record in his four seasons with Miami. He was fired in February 1970 and replaced by Don Shula.

After being fired as head coach of the Miami Dolphins, Wilson retired from football and entered the construction and real estate business in South Florida. By 1978, he moved back to Michigan, where he died of a heart attack in Detroit on November 23, 1978.

== Football ==
=== Playing career ===
He attended and played football at Saint Johns Northwestern Military Academy in Delafield, WI during high school as well as Northwestern University for college. Wilson was a member of the 1936 Wildcats team, which won the Big Ten Conference championship. After going undrafted in 1937, he was signed by the Chicago Bears later that year. Although Wilson participated in all eleven games of his rookie season, he started only two games. He recorded just one reception for 20 yards in 1937. The following season, Wilson recorded his first career touchdown. From 1940 to 1942, he was selected for the NFL All-Star Game, today known as the Pro Bowl, and was First-team in 1942. Wilson was a member of the Bears during their five appearances in the National Football League championship Game from 1940 to 1943 and in 1946, with the team winning in all but 1942. Listed as a starting right end for the 1940 NFL Championship Game, Wilson threw a tremendous block which took out two Redskin defenders as Bill Osmanski broke away for the Bears first score during their historic 73–0 rout of the Washington Redskins.

During the 1943 season, Wilson recorded a career-high 293 yards receiving and 5 touchdowns. In the 1943 NFL Championship Game, Wilson caught three passes for 29 yards in the club's 41–21 defeat of the Redskins. He had similar regular season performances in 1944 and 1945. In the former, he caught 24 passes for 265 yards, including 4 touchdowns. In 1945, Wilson recorded a career-high 28 receptions, for 259 yards and 3 touchdowns. He retired as a player following the 1946 season, compiling an overall record of 111 pass receptions, 1,342 receiving yards, and 15 touchdowns.

=== Coaching career ===
Wilson began his coaching career with the Bears in 1947, when he became an assistant coach to George Halas. He spent just two seasons with Chicago, before taking an assistant coaching position in 1949 with the Detroit Lions, a division rival of the Bears. Before the 1957 season began, he succeeded Buddy Parker as head coach, who abruptly resigned on August 12. Wilson instituted an 11 p.m. curfew for his team while issuing $50 per hour fines for violators and doing bed checks at training camp. He described his manner as such: "I joke around a lot, but there's only one way to play football and that is to beat down the other guy." The crackdown policy was modified to be tougher when the team had a middling run of preseason games, but it did not stop Wilson from having to bail out his quarterback Bobby Layne from an arrest on drunk driving in the middle of the night.

In his first year as head coach, Wilson guided Detroit to an 8–4 season and a 59–14 victory over the Cleveland Browns in the NFL championship game, still the most recent league title for the Lions. For his efforts, Wilson was the first recipient of the Associated Press NFL Coach of the Year Award. In January 1958, he also served as the Western Conference head coach for the first nationally televised Pro Bowl, while Parker, then head coach of the Pittsburgh Steelers, led the Eastern Conference. The Western Conference defeated the Eastern Conference by a score of 26–7.

In 1960, Wilson hired Don Shula as the defensive coordinator, who later succeeded him as head coach of the Miami Dolphins. The Lions were 7–5 in 1960 and advanced to the first edition of the third-place Playoff Bowl, where they defeated the Browns 17–16. Detroit's record was slightly better in 1961 at 8–5–1, went to the Playoff Bowl again, and soundly defeated the Philadelphia Eagles 38–10. Despite finishing the 1962 season with 11 victories and 3 defeats – the best win–loss record during Wilson's tenure – they failed for the third consecutive season to edge the Green Bay Packers in the NFL Western Conference, but won a third straight Playoff Bowl, this time 17–10 over the Steelers.

Wilson remained with the Lions through 1964, though they were unable reach another NFL championship game after 1957. He resigned on December 23, two days after his five assistant coaches were fired by ownership, and was succeeded by former Lions player Harry Gilmer. Upon his resignation from the Lions, Wilson had compiled a 53–45–6 (.538) record; only Wayne Fontes had more wins as head coach of Detroit. He then served for one year as an assistant coach under Bill McPeak with the Washington Redskins in 1965.

On January 29, 1966, Joe Robbie named Wilson the first head coach of the American Football League's first expansion franchise, the Miami Dolphins. The Dolphins finished their first season with a record of 3–11, tying the 1961 Minnesota Vikings and the 1966 Atlanta Falcons for the then-best record for an expansion team. Of the four starting quarterbacks during the Dolphins' inaugural year, one was Wilson's son, George Wilson Jr., who led them to their first win, a 24–7 victory over the Denver Broncos. However, after a poor season performance, he was traded to the Broncos, then soon released on July 15, 1967.

Miami improved slightly in 1967 and 1968, going 4–10 and 5–8–1, respectively. After the 1968 season, Wilson's three-year contract expired, leaving uncertainty if he would coach the team in 1969. Robbie stated "George has done a good job with players. That is his strong point. That doesn't mean he's weak in other aspects, but he handles players well." Wilson was signed to a new one-year contract on December 18, 1968. In February 1969, Wilson promised "continued improvement" for the team at a luncheon honoring the new draftees, while Miami mayor Stephen P. Clark presented him a plaque for "untiring efforts to bring Miami a championship football team." However, the Dolphins regressed to 3–10–1, worst in the AFL; Wilson was fired two months later on February 18, 1970, and was succeeded by Baltimore Colts' head coach Shula.

Although Wilson's record with Miami was an unimpressive 15–39–2 (.286), several draft picks and trades during his tenure allowed the Dolphins to acquire players who were instrumental in the team's success in the early 1970s, including drafting Bob Griese and Larry Seiple in 1967, Larry Csonka and Jim Kiick in 1968, and Bill Stanfill and Mercury Morris in 1969, as well as trades for Nick Buoniconti and Larry Little in 1969 and Paul Warfield in 1970.

Wilson's career record as a head coach was 68–84–8 (.450) and was 2–0 in the postseason. Among all coaches with an NFL / Super Bowl championship, he has the lowest winning percentage.

Initially, Wilson was critical over his removal as head coach and replacement with Shula. Following the 1970 and 1971 seasons, he attempted to repudiate the public perception that Shula built a strong team, stating that "As far as I'm concerned, he took over a ready-made team.", before adding "I was fired when the team was ready to go." In criticism directly aimed at Shula, Wilson remarked, "I also helped him get the Baltimore Colts head coaching job (in 1963). I practically wrote his contract for him. (Colts' owner) Carroll Rosenbloom wanted me to take the job and I had twelve meetings with him about it. But I got him to take Shula." However, any tension between them faded after Wilson congratulated Shula following the Dolphins victory in Super Bowl VII and after he invited Shula for a round of golf at his newly purchased golf course in July 1973.

In 1980, Wilson was posthumously inducted into the Michigan Sports Hall of Fame. Among the other three inductees was Alex Karras, a former Lions player whom he coached.

=== Head coaching record ===
Team	Year	Regular season					Post season			
Team	Year	Won	Lost	Ties	Win %	Finish	Won	Lost	Win %	Result
DET	1957	8	4	0	.667	1st in Western Conference	2	0	1.000	Won Western Conference Playoff over San Francisco 49ers Won NFL Championship over Cleveland Browns
DET	1958	4	7	1	.364	5th in National Conference	–	–	–	–
DET	1959	3	8	1	.273	5th in National Conference	–	–	–	–
DET	1960	7	5	0	.583	Tied for 2nd in National Conference	–	–	–	–
DET	1961	8	5	1	.615	2nd in National Conference	–	–	–	–
DET	1962	11	3	0	.786	2nd in National Conference	–	–	–	–
DET	1963	5	8	1	.385	Tied for 4th in National Conference	–	–	–	–
DET	1964	7	5	2	.583	4th in National Conference	–	–	–	–
DET Total		53	45	6	.541		2	0	1.000	–
MIA	1966	3	11	0	.214	5th in Eastern Division	–	–	–	–
MIA	1967	4	10	0	.286	4th in Eastern Division	–	–	–	–
MIA	1968	5	8	1	.385	3rd in Eastern Division	–	–	–	–
MIA	1969	3	10	1	.231	5th in Eastern Division	–	–	–	–
MIA Total		15	39	2	.286		-	-	-	–
Total		68	84	8	.450		2	0	1.000	1 NFL title in 12 seasons

== Basketball ==
=== Playing career ===
A 6'1" forward, Wilson played in the National Basketball League (a forerunner to the NBA) during the 1939–40 season. He averaged 1.1 points per game in 16 games for the Chicago Bruins.

== Film career ==
Wilson appeared as himself in Paper Lion, a 1968 sports comedy film starring Alan Alda as writer George Plimpton, based on Plimpton's 1966 nonfiction book of the same title, depicting his tryout with the Detroit Lions. The movie premiered in Detroit on October 2, 1968, and was released nationwide the week of October 14, 1968.

== Personal life ==
He and his wife, Claire, had four daughters and one son, George Wilson Jr. After being fired from his coaching position at the Miami Dolphins, Wilson entered the construction and real estate industries and also operated a golf course near Miami. In 1978, Wilson moved back to Michigan and intended to eventually live in a house he built in Howell, but died before doing so. On November 23, 1978, Wilson Sr. suffered a heart attack and died at Sinai-Grace Hospital in Detroit at the age of 64.
