= Clyde Conner =

American football player (1933–2011)

- Conner in 1961

No. 86, 88
- Position: Wide receiver

Personal information
- Born: May 18, 1933; Tuttle, Oklahoma, U.S.
- Died: December 12, 2011 (aged 78); Los Altos, California, U.S.
- Listed height: 6 ft 2 in (1.88 m)
- Listed weight: 193 lb (88 kg)

Career information
- High school: South San Francisco
- College: Pacific
- NFL draft: 1956: undrafted

Career history

Playing
- San Francisco 49ers (1956–1963)

Coaching
- San Jose Apaches (1967) Ends

Career NFL statistics
- Receptions: 203
- Receiving yards: 2,643
- Touchdowns: 18
- Stats at Pro Football Reference

Clyde Raymond Conner (May 18, 1933 – December 12, 2011) was an American professional football player who played split end for eight seasons with the San Francisco 49ers during the 1950s-60s. Clyde played football at Pacific for three seasons. He played varsity basketball for the Tigers during the 1954 and 1955 seasons, as well, and was a leading scorer at the guard position. In 1986 he was inducted into the university's Athletic Hall of Fame.

== Early life and college ==
Conner was born in Tuttle, Oklahoma; his family moved to South San Francisco, California in 1940. He graduated from South San Francisco High School, then attended the College of San Mateo before transferring to University of the Pacific.

Clyde played football at Pacific for three seasons. He played varsity basketball for the Tigers during the 1954 and 1955 seasons, as well, and was a leading scorer at the guard position. In 1986 he was inducted into the university's Athletic Hall of Fame.

== Professional football ==
Conner attended a 49ers' open tryout the year following his graduation and was signed by the team after making a notable catch during a scrimmage. He tied for fifth-place in voting for UPI Rookie of the year, and went on to play in 83 game over an eight-season career, making 203 catches for 2,643 yards. He missed all but five games of the 1961 season after suffering a concussion. He was put on waivers in September 1964.

== NFL career statistics ==
Legend
**Bold**	Career high

=== Regular season ===
Year	Team	Games		Receiving				
Year	Team	GP	GS	Rec	Yds	Avg	Lng	TD
1956	SFO	12	3	22	362	**16.5**	49	1
1957	SFO	8	8	30	412	13.7	41	4
1958	SFO	12	12	**49**	512	10.4	26	**5**
1959	SFO	9	8	13	162	12.5	37	1
1960	SFO	12	12	38	**531**	14.0	**65**	2
1961	SFO	5	5	11	177	16.1	45	1
1962	SFO	13	10	24	240	10.0	18	4
1963	SFO	11	9	16	247	15.4	42	0
Career		82	67	203	2,643	13.0	65	18

=== Playoffs ===
Year	Team	Games		Receiving				
Year	Team	GP	GS	Rec	Yds	Avg	Lng	TD
1957	SFO	1	1	1	10	10.0	10	0
Career		1	1	1	10	10.0	10	0

== Personal life ==
Conner married Mary MacRitchie in 1957; they lived in Los Altos with their son and daughter from 1967 until Clyde's death in 2011.
