= AP NFL Coach of the Year =

American football award given by the Associated Press

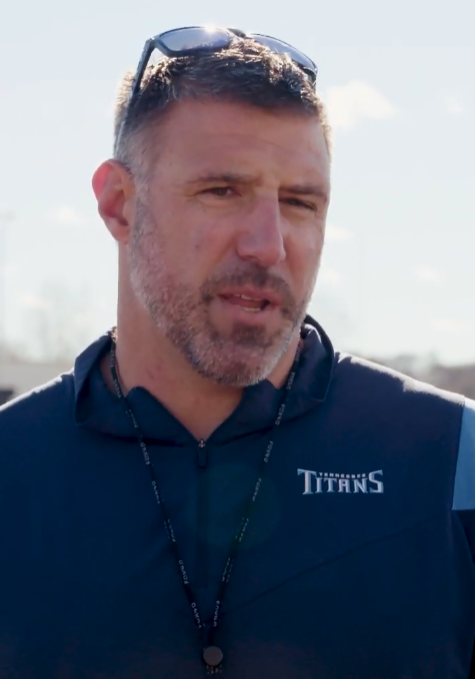
- Mike Vrabel, 2025 recipient
- Awarded for: Coach of the year in the National Football League
- Presented by: Associated Press

History
- First award: 1957
- Most wins: Don Shula (4)
- Most recent: Mike Vrabel (2)

The AP NFL Coach of the Year (COTY) is an annual award presented by the Associated Press (AP) to the National Football League (NFL) coach adjudged to have had the most outstanding season. It has been awarded since the 1957 season. Since 2011, the winner has been announced at the annual NFL Honors ceremony.

Don Shula has won the most AP NFL Coach of the Year awards, receiving four during his 33-year head coaching career: three with the Baltimore Colts and one with the Miami Dolphins, all of which were in a nine season span. Chuck Knox and Bill Belichick have each been awarded three times.

Three coaches have won the award in back to back years: Allie Sherman (1961–1962), Shula (1967–1968), and Joe Gibbs (1982–1983).

== Winners ==
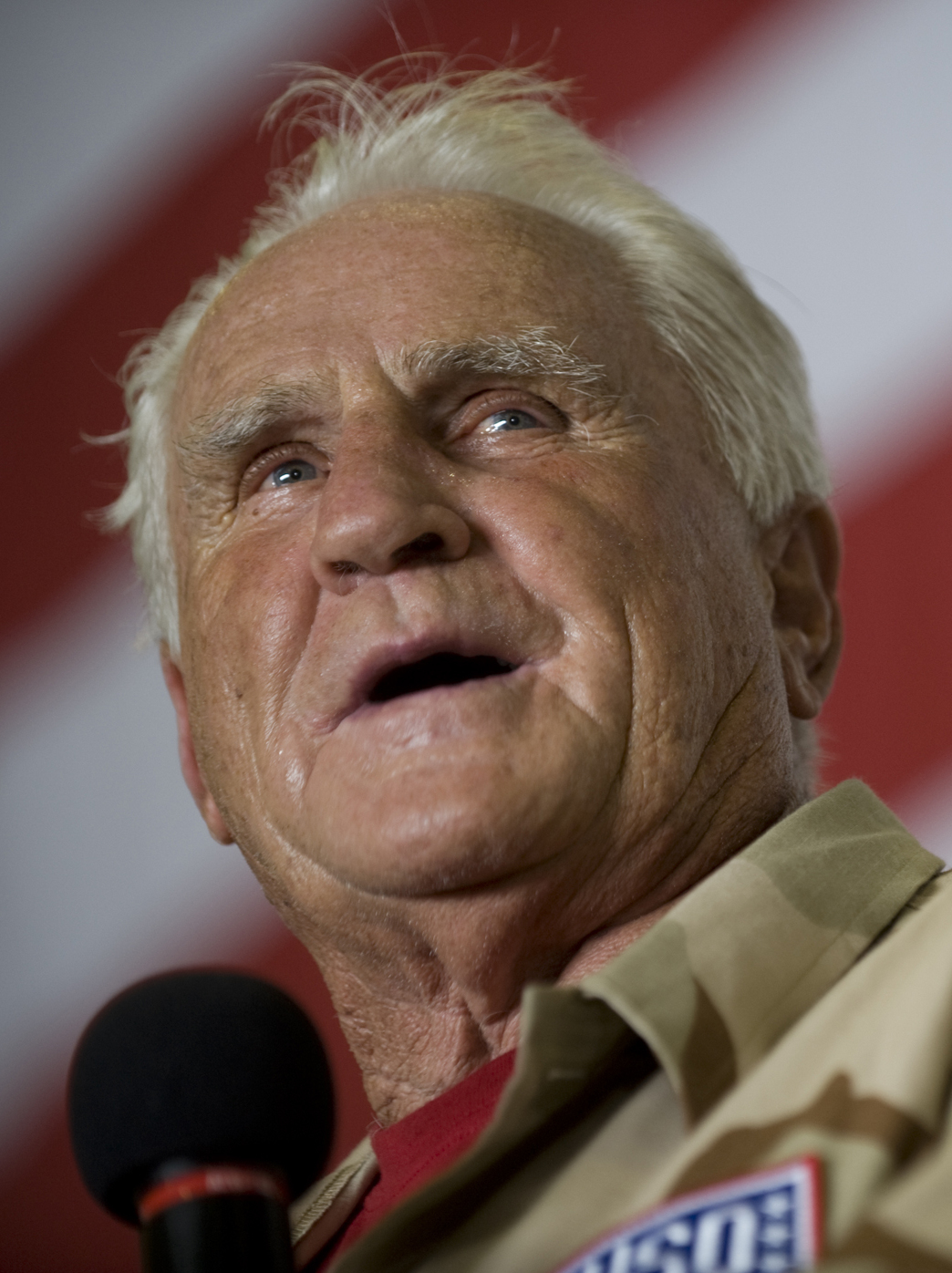
Don Shula was named Coach of the Year four times, the most of any coach.

Legend
†	Inducted into the Pro Football Hall of Fame
^	Currently active as a head coach in the NFL
*	Team won NFL championship (1957–1965) or Super Bowl (1966–present) the same year the recipient won the award
~	Won award following their first season as head coach of the team
(#)	Denotes the number of times a coach appears in this list

List of AP NFL Coach of the Year winners
Season	Coach	Team	Record	Ref.
1957	George Wilson~	Detroit Lions*	8–4	
1958	Weeb Ewbank†	Baltimore Colts*	9–3	
1959	Vince Lombardi~†	Green Bay Packers	7–5	
1960	Buck Shaw	Philadelphia Eagles*	10–2	
1961	Allie Sherman	New York Giants	10–3–1	
1962	Allie Sherman (2)	New York Giants	12–2	
1963	George Halas†	Chicago Bears*	11–1–2	
1964	Don Shula†	Baltimore Colts	12–2	
1965	George Halas† (2)	Chicago Bears	9–5	
1966	Tom Landry†	Dallas Cowboys	10–3–1	
1967	George Allen†	Los Angeles Rams	11–1–2	
1967	Don Shula† (2)	Baltimore Colts	11–1–2	
1968	Don Shula† (3)	Baltimore Colts	13–1	
1969	Bud Grant†	Minnesota Vikings	12–2	
1970	Paul Brown	Cincinnati Bengals	8–6	
1971	George Allen~† (2)	Washington Redskins	9–4–1	
1972	Don Shula† (4)	Miami Dolphins*	14–0	
1973	Chuck Knox	Los Angeles Rams	12–2	
1974	Don Coryell†	St. Louis Cardinals	10–4	
1975	Ted Marchibroda~	Baltimore Colts	10–4	
1976	Forrest Gregg† (Note: Mike Ditka and Forrest Gregg were inducted into the Pro Football Hall of Fame primarily in recognition of their playing careers.)	Cleveland Browns	9–5	
1977	Red Miller~	Denver Broncos	12–2	
1978	Jack Patera	Seattle Seahawks	9–7	
1979	Jack Pardee	Washington Redskins	10–6	
1980	Chuck Knox (2)	Buffalo Bills	11–5	
1981	Bill Walsh†	San Francisco 49ers*	13–3	
1982	Joe Gibbs†	Washington Redskins*	8–1	
1983	Joe Gibbs† (2)	Washington Redskins	14–2	
1984	Chuck Knox (3)	Seattle Seahawks	12–4	
1985	Mike Ditka†	Chicago Bears*	15–1	
1986	Bill Parcells†	New York Giants*	14–2	
1987	Jim Mora	New Orleans Saints	12–3	
1988	Mike Ditka† (2)	Chicago Bears	12–4	
1989	Lindy Infante	Green Bay Packers	10–6	
1990	Jimmy Johnson†	Dallas Cowboys	7–9	
1991	Wayne Fontes	Detroit Lions	12–4	
1992	Bill Cowher~†	Pittsburgh Steelers	11–5	
1993	Dan Reeves~	New York Giants	11–5	
1994	Bill Parcells† (2)	New England Patriots	10–6	
1995	Ray Rhodes~	Philadelphia Eagles	10–6	
1996	Dom Capers	Carolina Panthers	12–4	
1997	Jim Fassel~	New York Giants	10–5–1	
1998	Dan Reeves (2)	Atlanta Falcons	14–2	
1999	Dick Vermeil†	St. Louis Rams*	13–3	
2000	Jim Haslett~	New Orleans Saints	10–6	
2001	Dick Jauron	Chicago Bears	13–3	
2002	Andy Reid	Philadelphia Eagles	12–4	
2003	Bill Belichick	New England Patriots*	14–2	
2004	Marty Schottenheimer	San Diego Chargers	12–4	
2005	Lovie Smith	Chicago Bears	11–5	
2006	Sean Payton	New Orleans Saints	10–6	
2007	Bill Belichick (2)	New England Patriots	16–0	
2008	Mike Smith~	Atlanta Falcons	11–5	
2009	Marvin Lewis	Cincinnati Bengals	10–6	
2010	Bill Belichick (3)	New England Patriots	14–2	
2011	Jim Harbaugh~	San Francisco 49ers	13–3	
2012	Bruce Arians~	Indianapolis Colts	9–3 (Note: Bruce Arians served as interim head coach for team's final 12 games in place of Chuck Pagano.)	
2013	Ron Rivera	Carolina Panthers	12–4	
2014	Bruce Arians (2)	Arizona Cardinals	11–5	
2015	Ron Rivera (2)	Carolina Panthers	15–1	
2016	Jason Garrett	Dallas Cowboys	13–3	
2017	Sean McVay~	Los Angeles Rams	11–5	
2018	Matt Nagy~	Chicago Bears	12–4	
2019	John Harbaugh	Baltimore Ravens	14–2	
2020	Kevin Stefanski~	Cleveland Browns	11–5	
2021	Mike Vrabel	Tennessee Titans	12–5	
2022	Brian Daboll~	New York Giants	9–7–1	
2023	Kevin Stefanski (2)	Cleveland Browns	11–6	
2024	Kevin O'Connell	Minnesota Vikings	14–3	
2025	Mike Vrabel~ (2)	New England Patriots	14–3	

== Multiple-time winners ==
List of multiple-time winners
Count	Coach	Seasons	Team(s)	Ref.
4	Don Shula	1964, 1967, 1968, 1972	Baltimore Colts (3), Miami Dolphins	
3	Bill Belichick	2003, 2007, 2010	New England Patriots (3)	
3	Chuck Knox	1973, 1980, 1984	Los Angeles Rams, Buffalo Bills, Seattle Seahawks	
2	George Allen	1967, 1971	Los Angeles Rams, Washington Redskins	
2	Bruce Arians	2012, 2014	Indianapolis Colts, Arizona Cardinals	
2	Mike Ditka	1985, 1988	Chicago Bears (2)	
2	Joe Gibbs	1982, 1983	Washington Redskins (2)	
2	George Halas	1963, 1965	Chicago Bears (2)	
2	Bill Parcells	1986, 1994	New York Giants, New England Patriots	
2	Dan Reeves	1993, 1998	New York Giants, Atlanta Falcons	
2	Ron Rivera	2013, 2015	Carolina Panthers (2)	
2	Allie Sherman	1961, 1962	New York Giants (2)	
2	Kevin Stefanski	2020, 2023	Cleveland Browns (2)	
2	Mike Vrabel	2021, 2025	Tennessee Titans, New England Patriots	

== See also ==
- List of NFL Coach of the Year awards
