= 1957 Detroit Lions season =

NFL team season (won NFL Championship)

- Owner: Detroit Football Company
- General manager: Nick Kerbawy
- Head coach: George Wilson
- Home stadium: Briggs Stadium

Results
- Record: 8–4
- Division place: 1st NFL Western (playoff)
- Playoffs: Won Conference Playoff (at 49ers) 31–27; Won NFL Championship (vs. Browns) 59–14
- All-Pros: 5: LT Lou Creekmur (1st team); LG Harley Sewell (2nd team); MLB Joe Schmidt (1st team); SS Jack Christiansen (1st team); FS Yale Lary (2nd team)
- Pro Bowlers: 7: MLB Joe Schmidt; SS Jack Christiansen; FS Yale Lary; LT Lou Creekmur; LG Harley Sewell; LDH Jim David; LDE Darris McCord

The 1957 season was the Detroit Lions' 28th season in the National Football League (NFL), their 24th as the Detroit Lions, and their first under head coach George Wilson. Despite dropping one more game than the previous season, the Lions tied the San Francisco 49ers for first place in the NFL Western Conference. In the tiebreaker game, the Lions defeated the 49ers 31–27 to advance to their fourth championship appearance of the decade. Playing as underdogs, the Lions defeated the Cleveland Browns 59–14 to win their fourth NFL championship. As of the 2025 season, this is the last time the Lions have appeared in an NFL title game, the second-longest drought in the NFL and fourth-longest in the four major sports.

In the penultimate regular season game with the Cleveland Browns on December 8, Hall of Fame quarterback Bobby Layne was lost for the season with a broken right ankle. With backup Tobin Rote in at quarterback in the second quarter, the Lions won that game and overcame a ten-point deficit at halftime the following week to defeat the Chicago Bears 21–13, whom they had lost to three weeks earlier at home. They ended the regular season with three consecutive wins and an 8–4 record. All four losses were within the Western Conference, splitting the two games with all but the Green Bay Packers, whom they swept.

== Schedule ==
=== Regular season ===
According to the team, a total of 39,844 season tickets were sold by the Lions for the 1957 campaign. The Lions played their home games in Briggs Stadium (Tiger Stadium), which had a regular listed seating capacity of 46,194, with an additional 7,000 bleacher seats for football to bring total capacity to 53,194.

Game	Date	Opponent	Result	Record	Venue	Attendance	Sources
1	September 29	at **Baltimore Colts**	**L** 14–34	0–1	Memorial Stadium	40,112	
2	October 6	at **Green Bay Packers**	**W** 24–14	1–1	New City Stadium	32,132	
3	October 13	**Los Angeles Rams**	**W** 10–7	2–1	Briggs Stadium	55,764	
4	October 20	**Baltimore Colts**	**W** 31–27	3–1	Briggs Stadium	55,764	
5	October 27	at **Los Angeles Rams**	**L** 17–35	3–2	L.A. Memorial Coliseum	77,314	
6	November 3	at **San Francisco 49ers**	**L** 31–35	3–3	Kezar Stadium	59,702	
7	November 10	at Philadelphia Eagles	**W** 27–16	4–3	Connie Mack Stadium	29,320	
8	November 17	**San Francisco 49ers**	**W** 31–10	5–3	Briggs Stadium	56,915	
9	November 24	**Chicago Bears**	**L** 7–27	5–4	Briggs Stadium	55,769	
10	November 28	**Green Bay Packers**	**W** 18–6	6–4	Briggs Stadium	54,301	
11	December 8	Cleveland Browns	**W** 20–7	7–4	Briggs Stadium	55,814	
12	December 15	at **Chicago Bears**	**W** 21–13	8–4	Wrigley Field	41,088	
Note: Intra-conference opponents are in **bold** text.

- Thursday (November 28: Thanksgiving)

=== Playoffs ===
Game	Date	Opponent	Result	Venue	Attendance	Sources
Conference	December 22	at San Francisco 49ers	**W** 31–27	Kezar Stadium	60,118	
Championship	December 29	Cleveland Browns	**W** 59–14	Briggs Stadium	55,263	

== Standings ==
NFL Western Conference
	W	L	T	PCT	CONF	PF	PA	STK
Detroit Lions	8	4	0	.667	6–4	251	231	W3
San Francisco 49ers	8	4	0	.667	7–3	260	264	W3
Baltimore Colts	7	5	0	.583	6–4	303	235	L2
Los Angeles Rams	6	6	0	.500	5–5	307	278	W2
Chicago Bears	5	7	0	.417	4–6	203	211	L1
Green Bay Packers	3	9	0	.250	2–8	218	311	L3

Note: Tie games were not officially counted in the standings until 1972.

== Roster ==
Detroit Lions 1957 roster
Quarterbacks: 22 Bobby Layne K; 18 Tobin Rote; Running backs: 40 Howard Cassady; 26 Gene Gedman; 82 Leon Hart; 35 John Henry Johnson; 30 Tom Tracy; Receivers: 87 Dorne Dibble; 83 Jim Doran; 88 Steve Junker; 84 Dave Middleton; 80 Jerry Reichow	Offensive linemen: 50 Charlie Ane T/C; 67 Stan Campbell G; 76 Lou Creekmur T; 52 Frank Gatski C; 75 John Gordy G; 73 Ken Russell T; 66 Harley Sewell G; Defensive linemen: 68 Gene Cronin DE; 70 Ray Krouse DT; 72 Gil Mains DE/DT; 78 Darris McCord DE; 74 Bob Miller DT; 79 Gerry Perry DE/DT	Linebackers: 86 Bob Long OLB; 47 Jim Martin OLB/MLB/K; 56 Joe Schmidt MLB; 57 Roger Zatkoff OLB; Defensive backs: 41 Terry Barr CB; 24 Jack Christiansen S; 25 James David CB; 21 Carl Karilivacz CB; 28 Yale Lary S/P; 43 Gary Lowe S	Reserve lists: 85 Sonny Gandee LB (IR); -- Dick Marazza T (IR); -- Tom Rychlec WR (Military); rookies in italics

== Season summary ==
At the "Meet the Lions" banquet on Monday, August 12, seventh-year head coach Buddy Parker surprised the audience by abruptly announcing his resignation; longtime assistant coach George Wilson was promoted the following day. Two weeks later, Parker became the head coach of the Pittsburgh Steelers.

=== Week 1: at Baltimore ===
Team	1	2	3	4	Total
Detroit	7	0	0	7	14
• Baltimore	7	17	10	0	34

- Date: September 29
- Location: Memorial Stadium, Baltimore
- Game attendance: 40,112

The Lions opened the regular season on the road with a 34–14 loss to the Baltimore Colts on September 29. Quarterback Johnny Unitas threw four touchdown passes while the Baltimore defense held the Lions to 23 rushing yards and intercepted Bobby Layne three times. Detroit's touchdowns were scored by Howard Cassady (a short run for his first NFL touchdown) and Jerry Reichow on a 32-yard pass from backup quarterback Tobin Rote.

=== Week 2: at Green Bay Packers ===
Quarter	1	2	3	4	Total
Lions	14	3	0	7	24
Packers	0	0	0	14	14

at New City Stadium, Green Bay, Wisconsin

- Date: October 6
- Pro-Football-Reference.com

Game information

First Quarter

- Lions – Tobin Rote 2-yard run (Bobby Layne kick) – Lions 7–0
- Lions – Jack Christiansen 27-yard interception return (Bobby Layne kick) – Lions 14–0

Second Quarter

- Lions – Bobby Layne 15-yard field goal – Lions 17–0

Fourth Quarter

- Lions – Gene Gedman 1-yard run (Bobby Layne kick) – Lions 24–0
- Packers – Bart Starr 1-yard run (Fred Cone kick) – Lions 24–7
- Packers – Fred Cone 26-yard run (Fred Cone kick) – Lions 24–14

Lions

- John Henry Johnson
  18 Rush, 109 Yds

=== Week 3: Los Angeles Rams ===
Team	1	2	3	4	Total
Rams	0	7	0	0	7
• Lions	0	10	0	0	10

- Date: October 13
- Location: Briggs Stadium, Detroit
- Game attendance: 55,764

Scoring summary
Q2	LA	Arnett 12 yard pass from Van Brocklin (Cothren kick)	LA 7–0
Q2	DET	Reichow 16 yard pass from Rote (Layne kick)	Tie 7–7
Q2	DET	Layne 25 yard field goal	DET 10–7

=== Week 4: Baltimore Colts ===
Team	1	2	3	4	Total
Colts	7	14	6	0	27
• Lions	0	3	7	21	31

- Date: October 20
- Location: Briggs Stadium, Detroit
- Game attendance: 55,764

Scoring summary
Q1	BAL	Mutscheller 15 yard pass from Unitas (Rechichar kick)	BAL 7–0
Q2	DET	Martin 47 yard field goal	BAL 7–3
Q2	BAL	Moore 72 yard pass from Unitas (Rechichar kick)	BAL 14–3
Q2	BAL	Mutscheller 66 yard pass from Unitas (Rechichar kick)	BAL 21–3
Q3	BAL	Moore 4 yard pass from Unitas (kick failed)	BAL 27–3
Q3	DET	Junker 14 yard pass from Rote (Layne kick)	BAL 27–10
Q4	DET	Cassady 26 yard pass from Layne (Layne kick)	BAL 27–17
Q4	DET	Johnson 1 yard run (Layne kick)	BAL 27–24
Q4	DET	Cassady 29 yard pass from Layne (Layne kick)	DET 31–27

=== Playoffs vs. San Francisco ===
Team	1	2	3	4	Total
• Detroit	0	7	14	10	31
San Francisco	14	10	3	0	27

- Date: December 22
- Location: Kezar Stadium, San Francisco
- Game attendance: 60,118

On December 22, the Lions defeated the San Francisco 49ers, 31–27, in a Western Conference playoff game. The two teams had finished the regular season tied in the standings at 8–4, which called for a tiebreaker game.

The 49ers took a 24–7 lead at halftime, as Y. A. Tittle threw three touchdown passes in the first half. A field goal early in the third quarter extended the lead to 27–7, then the Lions responded with 24 unanswered points. Detroit's touchdowns were scored by Steve Junker on a four-yard pass from Tobin Rote, two runs by Tom Tracy (1-yard and 58-yard runs), and Gene Gedman on a two-yard run.

=== NFL Championship Game ===
Team	1	2	3	4	Total
Cleveland	0	7	7	0	14
• Detroit	17	14	14	14	59

- Date: December 29
- Location: Briggs Stadium, Detroit
- Game attendance: 55,263

On December 29, the Lions defeated the Cleveland Browns 59–14 in the NFL championship game. The Browns had been favored to win by three points. Tobin Rote, filling in at quarterback after Bobby Layne broke his ankle on December 8, was credited with "a brilliant performance" as he completed 12 of 19 passes for 280 yards and four touchdowns and rushed for a touchdown, leading the Lions to their greatest point total in history. The Lions capitalized on five interceptions and two fumble recoveries, including a 19-yard interception return for touchdown by Terry Barr, and held Cleveland star rookie Jim Brown to 69 rushing yards on 20 carries.

The longest play of the game was a 78-yard touchdown pass from Rote to Jim Doran. Rookie Steve Junker was the Lions' leading scorer with 12 points on touchdown receptions covering 26 and 23 yards. Jim Martin followed with 11 points on eight extra-point conversions and a 31-yard field goal. The victory gave the Lions their third NFL championship in six years. It was also referred to as "the perfect revenge" for the Browns' 56–10 rout of the Lions in the title game in 1954.
