= 1957 NFL Championship Game =

Coordinates: 42.332°N 83.069°W

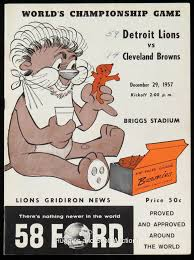
Cleveland Browns (Eastern) (9–2–1)	Detroit Lions (Western) (8–4)
14	59
Head coach: Paul Brown	Head coach: George Wilson
	1	2	3	4	Total
CLE	0	7	7	0	14
DET	17	14	14	14	59
- Date: December 29, 1957
- Stadium: Briggs Stadium; Detroit, Michigan
- Attendance: 55,263

TV in the United States
- Network: NBC
- Announcers: Van Patrick; Ken Coleman; Red Grange

Radio in the United States
- Network: NBC
- Announcers: Ray Scott; Bill McColgan

Location in the United States
Location in Michigan

The 1957 NFL Championship Game was the 25th annual championship game of the National Football League (NFL), held on December 29 at Briggs Stadium in Detroit, Michigan.

The Detroit Lions (8–4), winners of the Western Conference in a playoff the previous week, hosted the Cleveland Browns (9–2–1), champions of the Eastern Conference. Detroit had won the regular season game 20–7 three weeks earlier on December 8, also at Briggs Stadium, but lost quarterback Bobby Layne with a broken right ankle late in the first half. Reserve quarterback Tobin Rote, a starter the previous year with Green Bay, filled in for Layne and won that game with Cleveland, the next week at Chicago, and the tiebreaker playoff game at San Francisco.

It was the fourth pairing of the two teams in the championship game; they met previously in 1952, 1953, and 1954. The Browns, idle the previous week, were favored by three points, but the home underdog Lions scored two touchdowns in each quarter and won in a rout, 59–14.

Until 2006, this was the last time that major professional teams from Michigan and Ohio met in a postseason game (or series) in any sport. This was the last NFL playoff game played in the city of Detroit other than Super Bowl XL until 2024 as the Lions' other two home playoff games prior (1992 and 1994) were at the Silverdome in suburban Pontiac. This also remains as the Lions' fourth and most recent league title and most recent championship appearance (including the Super Bowl) as of 2026, starting a sixty-nine year championship drought for the Lions, which is currently the fourth-longest championship drought in the four major North American sports leagues.

== Starting lineups ==
Hall of Fame‡

Detroit	Position	Cleveland
Offense
Jim Doran	LE	Pete Brewster
Lou Creekmur‡	LT	Lou Groza‡
Harley Sewell	LG	Herschel Forester
Frank Gatski‡	C	Art Hunter
Stan Campbell	RG	Fred Robinson
Ken Russell	RT	Mike McCormack‡
Steve Junker	RE	Preston Carpenter
Tobin Rote	QB	Tommy O'Connell
Gene Gedman	LHB	Ray Renfro
Hopalong Cassady	RHB	Lew Carpenter
John Henry Johnson‡	FB	Jim Brown‡
Defense
Darris McCord	LDE	Bill Quinlan
Ray Krouse	LDT	Bob Gain
Gil Mains	RDT	Don Colo
Gene Cronin	RDE	Len Ford‡
Bob Long	LLB	Galen Fiss
Joe Schmidt‡	MLB	Vince Costello
Roger Zatkoff	RLB	Walt Michaels
Carl Karilivacz	DB	Junior Wren
Jack Christiansen‡	DB	Ken Konz
Yale Lary‡	DB	Warren Lahr
Jim David	DB	Don Paul

== Players in the Hall of Fame ==
Of those listed above, Lions' QB Bobby Layne was injured earlier in the month and did not play, and future Green Bay Packers defensive tackle Henry Jordan was a rookie for the Browns.

== Game summary ==
=== First half ===
The Browns won the opening coin toss and elected to receive. Detroit forced Cleveland to punt on their opening possession, getting the ball at their own 11. The Lions converted four straight first downs, including a Tobin Rote 20-yard pass to Steve Junker that put them into Brown territory. They would convert on a Jim Martin 31-yard field goal to take the early 3–0 lead. The Browns would give the ball right back after a Tommy O'Connell interception by Bob Long that was returned 17 yards. The Lions, helped by a Rote 17-yard rush, punched it in with a quarterback sneak to go up 10–0. On the kickoff return, Milt Campbell fumbled it over to Detroit. Detroit would capitalize with a Gene Gedman 1-yard score. The Browns would get on the board with a Jim Brown 29-yard touchdown. The two teams traded punts before the Lions got the ball at their own 13. They got down to the Browns 26-yard line, and looked to kick a field goal on 4th and 11. However, Rote, as the holder, took the snap and threw it to Junker in the endzone for the 26-yard touchdown pass to go up 24–7. On their responding drive, the Browns attempted a trick play with halfback Chet Hanulak, however his pass was intercepted. Detroit gave the ball right back with a Junker fumble, but an O'Connell errant throw was picked off by Terry Barr, who returned it 19 yards for the touchdown. The Browns benched O'Connell in favor of Milt Plum, who was immediately intercepted on his third pass of the game in Lions' territory. Detroit punted, before a Browns fumble put them in range for a field goal try. However, the 44-yard kick was no-good, setting the halftime score at 31–7.

=== Second half ===
Detroit punted on their first possession of the second half, as Cleveland took the ball 80-yards to score on a Lew Carpenter 5-yard touchdown run. On their first drive, Rote took a deep shot to Jim Doran who hauled it in at the Browns' 42 and proceeded to run it all the way for the 78-yard touchdown score. The Browns punted on their next drive before the Lions extended their lead with a Rote–Junker 23-yard touchdown pass to go up 45–14. Plum was intercepted on the third play of their ensuing drive, as Detroit ran it up with another Rote touchdown pass, this time to Dave Middleton. The Browns took their next drive into Detroit territory, before a sack forced them back 40 yards behind the first-down marker which resulted in a turnover on downs. Both teams traded punts before Detroit scored their last touchdown of the game on a Jerry Reichow pass to Howard Cassady.

=== Scoring summary ===
Sunday, December 29, 1957
Kickoff: 2:00 p.m. EST

- First quarter
  - DET – FG Jim Martin, 31 yards, 3–0 DET
  - DET – Tobin Rote 1-yard run (Martin kick), 10–0 DET
  - DET – Gene Gedman 1-yard run (Martin kick), 17–0 DET
- Second quarter
  - CLE – Jim Brown 29-yard run (Lou Groza kick), 17–7 DET
  - DET – Steve Junker 26-yard pass from Rote (Martin kick), 24–7 DET
  - DET – Terry Barr 19-yard interception (Martin kick), 31–7 DET
- Third quarter
  - CLE – Lew Carpenter 5-yard run (Groza kick), 31–14 DET
  - DET – Jim Doran 78-yard pass from Rote (Martin kick), 38–14 DET
  - DET – Junker 23-yard pass from Rote (Martin kick), 45–14 DET
- Fourth quarter
  - DET – Dave Middleton 32-yard pass from Rote (Martin kick), 52–14 DET
  - DET – Howard Cassady 17-yard pass from Jerry Reichow (Martin kick), 59–14 DET

== Officials ==
- Referee: Ron Gibbs
- Umpire: Joe Connell
- Head linesman: Dan Tehan
- Back judge: Cleo Diehl
- Field judge: Don Looney
- Alternate: George Rennix
- Alternate: James Beiersdorfer
- Alternate: Charlie Berry
- Alternate: Chuck Sweeney

The NFL had five game officials in 1957; the line judge was added in 1965 and the side judge in 1978.

== Players' shares ==
The gross receipts for the game, including radio and television rights, were just under $594,000, the highest to date. Each player on the winning Lions team received $4,295, while Browns players made $2,750 each.

== Lions' last title ==
The Lions have not appeared in an NFL championship game (including the Super Bowl) since this title 69 years ago, making it the longest active championship round appearance drought in the league. It was their last postseason appearance until 1970, and their last postseason home game and victory until 1992. 1992 was also the first time the Lions advanced as far as the NFC Championship game, losing the NFC Championship Game 41–10 to the Washington Redskins, who went on to win Super Bowl XXVI. They would advance to the NFC Championship game again 32 years later in 2024, where they would fall to the San Francisco 49ers 34–31 after leading by as many as 17 points, which is the closest the Lions have ever gotten to a Super Bowl to date.

The only team in the four major North American leagues with a longer active championship round appearance drought are the NBA’s Sacramento Kings, who last appeared in a championship series in 1951 as the Rochester Royals, six years before Detroit’s last championship.

== Video ==
- Daniel G. Endy (ed.), "Detroit Lions vs. Cleveland Browns in Football's World Championship: Part 1," Earl Gillespie and Chris Schenkel, narrators. YouTube.com | Part 2

== See also ==
- 1957 NFL playoffs
