= Ronnie Knox =

American gridiron football player (1935–1992)

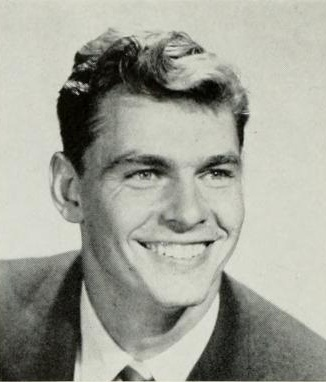
- Knox from 1956 UCLA yearbook

No. 99, 81, 18, 92
- Position: Quarterback

Personal information
- Born: February 14, 1935; Chicago, Illinois, U.S.
- Died: May 4, 1992 (aged 57); San Francisco, California, U.S.
- Listed height: 6 ft 1 in (1.85 m)
- Listed weight: 198 lb (90 kg)

Career information
- High school: Beverly Hills (Beverly Hills, California)
- College: California (1953); UCLA (1954–1955)
- NFL draft: 1957: 3rd round, 37th overall pick

Career history
- Hamilton Tiger-Cats (1956); Calgary Stampeders (1956); Chicago Bears (1957); Toronto Argonauts (1958–1959)

Awards and highlights
- Second-team All-PCC (1955)
- Stats at Pro Football Reference

Ronald Knox (February 14, 1935 – May 4, 1992) was an American professional football player. He played quarterback in the National Football League (NFL) and Canadian Football League (CFL). He played college football at UC Berkeley and UCLA.

== Early life and college ==
Knox was born in Chicago, Illinois. The son of Dr. Raoul Landry, who was a professor of nuclear physics, Ronnie's parents divorced when he was young. He had a sister, Patricia.

An All-American at Santa Monica High School, and known by his step-father's surname, Ronnie Knox played under the tutelage of coach Jim Sutherland. He played his freshman season for Pappy Waldorf's California Golden Bears before abruptly transferring to UCLA in the fall of 1954. Knox's stepfather, Harvey Knox, was accused of interfering with the Bears' coaching staff and of making extreme monetary demands on the university.

Harvey Knox interfered with his son's high school coaches and Ronnie played for three different high school teams (Beverly Hills, Inglewood, Santa Monica) in three years. Harvey Knox was also accused of interfering in the business of his stepdaughter, actress Patricia Knox.

Ronnie Knox played for one season at UCLA in 1955 before being declared ineligible due to accepting "under-the-table" financing.

== Professional career ==
After leaving UCLA, Knox signed a movie contract with Metro-Goldwyn-Mayer, but he never appeared in any pictures for the studio. Knox signed with the Hamilton Tiger-Cats, but left the team after one month to once again pursue a film career. Knox signed with the Calgary Stampeders on October 3, 1956, six days after quitting the Tiger-Cats.

Selected in the third round of the 1957 NFL draft, Knox signed with the Chicago Bears. He was suspended indefinitely by head coach (and owner) George Halas in early October 1957 for violations which included his stepfather's public criticism of the team and missing two practices and a quarterback tutoring session without reason.

Due to a bitter dispute with the Bears, Knox was not allowed by Halas to play for the Bears or play for any other NFL team. Instead, he signed with the Toronto Argonauts midway through 1958 CFL season with a promise by Harvey Knox to the team that he would not interfere. His most notable performance came on October 25, 1958 when, playing the Ottawa Rough Riders, he passed for 522 yards, then a team record and still second most in Argonaut history. After splitting up with his stepfather, Knox played only one more season of football before retiring, saying that football was a "game for animals".

== Post-sports ==
After leaving Toronto, Knox appeared in a few movies and television shows, but did not return to football, despite offers from the Oakland Raiders and San Diego Chargers of the newly formed American Football League.

In the 1960s, 1970s, and 1980s Knox drifted around California, residing only a short time in various towns, prior to moving again. In July 1988 a reporter located him as he was moving out of a one-room apartment in Canoga Park. Knox had lived there for just several weeks, spending the majority of his time writing poetry. Aside from past residences in McKinleyville, Malibu, and San Francisco, Knox lived for short periods in Maine and Texas. He also lived for brief stints in Mexico and Europe.

Having been single since a divorce from painter Renate Druks in 1964, his philosophy was to stay free. Knox compared his lifestyle to the noble savage written about by James Fenimore Cooper. He read English literature by the hour, stretched out on a cot or in his worn out twelve-year-old car. He yearned for a life at sea.
