= 1957 NFL playoffs =

American football tournament

- Dates: December 22–29, 1957
- Season: 1957
- Teams: 3
- Games played: 2
- NFL Championship Game site: Briggs Stadium; Detroit, Michigan
- Defending champions: New York Giants (did not qualify)
- Champion: Detroit Lions (4th title)
- Runner-up: Cleveland Browns
- Conference runners-up: San Francisco 49ers; New York Giants
NFL playoffs
← 1952	1958 →

The 1957 National Football League season resulted in a tie for the Western Conference championship between the Detroit Lions and San Francisco 49ers. Both finished at 8–4 and had split their two games during the regular season in November, with the home team winning each.

The tie thus required a one-game playoff to be held between the two teams. This conference championship game was played on December 22 at Kezar Stadium in San Francisco; down 27–7 early in the second half, Detroit rallied with 24 unanswered points to win 31–27.

The Lions moved on to host the Cleveland Browns on December 29 in the championship game, and won in a 59–14 rout at Briggs Stadium for their third title in six years. As of 2026, it is Detroit's most recent league title, and fourth-most recent victory in a postseason game.

== Tournament bracket ==
Western Conference playoff December 22			NFL Championship; December 29
			E	Cleveland	14
W	Detroit	31	W	Detroit	59
W	San Francisco	27

== Western Conference championship ==
Detroit Lions 31, San Francisco 49ers 27

Quarter	1	2	3	4	Total
Lions	0	7	14	10	31
49ers	14	10	3	0	27

at Kezar Stadium in San Francisco, California

- Date: December 22, 1957
- Game time: 1:00 p.m. PST
- Game attendance: 60,118
- Pro-Football-Reference.com

Game information

- First quarter
  - SF – R.C. Owens 34-yard pass from Y. A. Tittle (Gordy Soltau kick). 49ers 7–0
  - SF – Hugh McElhenny 47-yard pass from Tittle (Soltau kick). 49ers 14–0
- Second quarter
  - DET – Steve Junker 4-yard pass from Tobin Rote (Jim Martin kick). 49ers 14–7
  - SF – Billy Wilson 12-yard pass from Tittle (Soltau kick). 49ers 21–7
  - SF – Gordy Soltau 25-yard field goal. 49ers 24–7
- Third quarter
  - SF – Gordy Soltau 10-yard field goal. 49ers 27–7
  - DET – Tom Tracy 1-yard run (Martin kick). 49ers 27–14
  - DET – Tom Tracy 58-yard run (Martin kick). 49ers 27–21
- Fourth quarter
  - DET – Gene Gedman 2-yard run (Martin kick). Lions 28–27
  - DET – Jim Martin 13-yard field goal. Lions 31–27

Top passers

- DET – Tobin Rote – 16/30, 214 yards, 1 TD, 1 INT
- SF – Y.A. Tittle – 18/31, 248 yards, 3 TD, 3 INT

Top rushers

- DET – Tom Tracy – 11 carries, 86 yards, 2 TD
- SF – Hugh McElhenny – 14 carries, 82 yards

Top receivers

- DET – Steve Junker – 8 receptions, 92 yards, 1 TD
- SF – Billy Wilson – 9 receptions, 107 yards, 1 TD

The Lions trailed the 49ers 24–7 at halftime and were down twenty points in the third quarter. During halftime, Lions players were apparently motivated by the jubilant sounds coming out from the Niner locker room; gloating or not gloating, the Lions cited it as motivation for the second half. Hugh McElhenny went on a 71-yard run in the third quarter that saw him just short of the goal line, but San Francisco settled for a field goal not long after due to the Detroit defense. It was their last points of the season. Quarterback Bobby Layne had been lost for the season two weeks earlier, and backup Tobin Rote led the Lions' rally, scoring 24 unanswered points in the second half to win, 31–27, with Tom Tracy (a Detroit back who hadn't played in four games that played due to injury to John Henry Johnson) scoring two touchdowns. Gene Gedman, another back with little playing time for Detroit, scored the go-ahead touchdown in less than a minute into the fourth quarter. Y.A. Tittle threw three interceptions in the fourth quarter (the last to Roger Zatkoff) and lost a fumble in a disastrous fourth quarter for the 49ers, who had four turnovers in the final frame and saw Joe Perry suffer a broken jaw. The game was featured on NFL Top 10 as #2 on Top Ten Comebacks. It was the largest comeback in a playoff game for 36 years.

As of 2026, this is the last time the Lions have won a playoff game on the road and is the last time the Lions won a conference championship. The Lions currently hold the longest active championship round appearance drought in the NFL. The only team in the four major North American leagues with a longer active championship round appearance drought are the NBA’s Sacramento Kings, who last appeared in a championship series in 1951 as the Rochester Royals, six years before Detroit’s last conference championship.
