= John Damore =

American football player (1933–2026)

No. 50, 61
- Positions: Center, guard

Personal information
- Born: October 20, 1933; Riverside, Illinois, U.S.
- Died: August 4, 2026 (aged 92); Westmont, Illinois, U.S.
- Listed height: 6 ft 0 in (1.83 m)
- Listed weight: 228 lb (103 kg)

Career information
- High school: Riverside Brookfield
- College: Northwestern
- NFL draft: 1955: 13th round, 152nd overall pick

Career history
- Chicago Bears (1957–1959); Mohawk Valley Falcons (1965)

Awards and highlights
- Second-team All-Big Ten (1954)

Career NFL statistics
- Games played: 12
- Fumble recoveries: 1
- Stats at Pro Football Reference

John Damore (October 20, 1933 – August 4, 2026) was an American professional football player who was an offensive lineman with the Chicago Bears of the National Football League (NFL) for two seasons in 1957 and 1959. He missed the entire 1958 campaign due to sustaining a dislocated right ankle in a 24–17 preseason win over the Detroit Lions at the Cotton Bowl on 5 September. He ended his career as an active player after the 1959 season to manage a Riverside, Illinois-based cement construction firm owned by his father who had retired from its daily operations. His yearly salary as an NFL player was $9,000.

Damore played college football with the Bob Voigts-coached Northwestern Wildcats, serving as a senior co-captain in 1954. He was selected in Round 13 (152nd overall) by the New York Giants in the 1955 NFL draft.

A lifelong Bears fan, Damore continued to follow the team after his career ended. He died on August 4, 2026, at the age of 92. He was the oldest surviving Bear prior to his death.
