= 1957 Baltimore Colts season =

5th season in franchise history

- Owner: Carroll Rosenbloom
- General manager: Don "Red" Kellett
- Head coach: Weeb Ewbank
- Home stadium: Memorial Stadium

Results
- Record: 7–5
- Division place: 3rd NFL Western
- Playoffs: Did not qualify

The 1957 Baltimore Colts season was the fifth season for the team in the National Football League, their first season with a winning record as the Colts, and their first in seven years when they were still known as the New York Yanks. Under fourth-year head coach Weeb Ewbank, the Colts posted a record of 7 wins and 5 losses, third in the Western Conference, one game behind Detroit and San Francisco.

== Season summary ==
With two games to play, Baltimore (7–3) was in first place with a one-game lead, but dropped their final two games on the West Coast.

This was the first season in which the Colts wore their trademark "horseshoe" logo on both sides of their helmet, with the team also debuting a new uniform kit featuring "blue jerseys highlighted with two white shoulder stripes" and white pants with "two lines of blue piping up the sides." While the team had experimented with placement of the horseshoe logo on the back of the helmet for several seasons previously, it was in 1957 that the white helmets with the large blue logos were unveiled.

== Regular season ==
=== Schedule ===
Game	Date	Opponent	Result	Record	Venue	Attendance	Recap	Sources
1	September 29	**Detroit Lions**	**W** 34–14	1–0	Memorial Stadium	40,112	Recap	
2	October 5	**Chicago Bears**	**W** 21–10	2–0	Memorial Stadium	46,558	Recap	
3	October 13	at **Green Bay Packers**	**W** 45–17	3–0	Milwaukee County Stadium	26,322	Recap	
4	October 20	at **Detroit Lions**	**L** 27–31	3–1	Briggs Stadium	55,764	Recap	
5	October 27	**Green Bay Packers**	**L** 21–24	3–2	Memorial Stadium	48,510	Recap	
6	November 3	Pittsburgh Steelers	**L** 13–19	3–3	Memorial Stadium	42,575	Recap	
7	November 10	at Washington Redskins	**W** 21–17	4–3	Griffith Stadium	33,149	Recap	
8	November 17	at **Chicago Bears**	**W** 29–14	5–3	Wrigley Field	47,168	Recap	
9	November 24	**San Francisco 49ers**	**W** 27–21	6–3	Memorial Stadium	50,073	Recap	
10	December 1	**Los Angeles Rams**	**W** 31–14	7–3	Memorial Stadium	52,060	Recap	
11	December 8	at **San Francisco 49ers**	**L** 13–17	7–4	Kezar Stadium	59,950	Recap	
12	December 15	at **Los Angeles Rams**	**L** 21–37	7–5	L.A. Memorial Coliseum	52,560	Recap	
Note: Intra-conference opponents are in **bold** text.

== Standings ==
NFL Western Conference
	W	L	T	PCT	CONF	PF	PA	STK
Detroit Lions	8	4	0	.667	6–4	251	231	W3
San Francisco 49ers	8	4	0	.667	7–3	260	264	W3
Baltimore Colts	7	5	0	.583	6–4	303	235	L2
Los Angeles Rams	6	6	0	.500	5–5	307	278	W2
Chicago Bears	5	7	0	.417	4–6	203	211	L1
Green Bay Packers	3	9	0	.250	2–8	218	311	L3

Note: Tie games were not officially counted in the standings until 1972.

== Roster ==
Training camp photo of the 1957 Baltimore Colts. Note that these were the "old" uniforms with three stripes on the arm; the new regular season uniforms had two stripes over the shoulder.

1957 Baltimore Colts roster
Quarterbacks: 18 Cotton Davidson P; 14 George Shaw; 19 Johnny Unitas; Running backs: 35 Alan Ameche; 25 Jack Call; 45 L. G. Dupre; 24 Lenny Moore; 31 Billy Pricer; Receivers: 82 Raymond Berry; 84 Jim Mutscheller; 26 Royce Womble	Offensive linemen: 74 Ken Jackson G/T; 65 Steve Myhra G/K/LB; 50 Buzz Nutter C; 72 Luke Owens T; 77 Jim Parker T; 60 George Preas T; 68 Alex Sandusky G; 63 Art Spinney G; Defensive linemen: 81 Ordell Braase DE; 73 Joe Campanella DT; 70 Art Donovan DT; 83 Don Joyce DE; 76 Gene Lipscomb DT; 89 Gino Marchetti DE	Linebackers: 67 Doug Eggers OLB; 61 Jack Patera MLB; 66 Don Shinnick OLB; 52 Dick Szymanski OLB; Defensive backs: 20 Milt Davis CB; 23 Art DeCarlo CB; 27 Henry Moore CB; 80 Andy Nelson S; 44 Bert Rechichar S/K; 40 Jesse Thomas CB/S	Reserve list: -- John Lewis WR (Military); 18 Dick Nyers RB (IR); 36 Bill Pellington LB (IR); 23 Carl Taseff CB (IR); rookies in italics

== See also ==
- History of the Indianapolis Colts
