= Jim Mutscheller =

American football player (1930–2015)

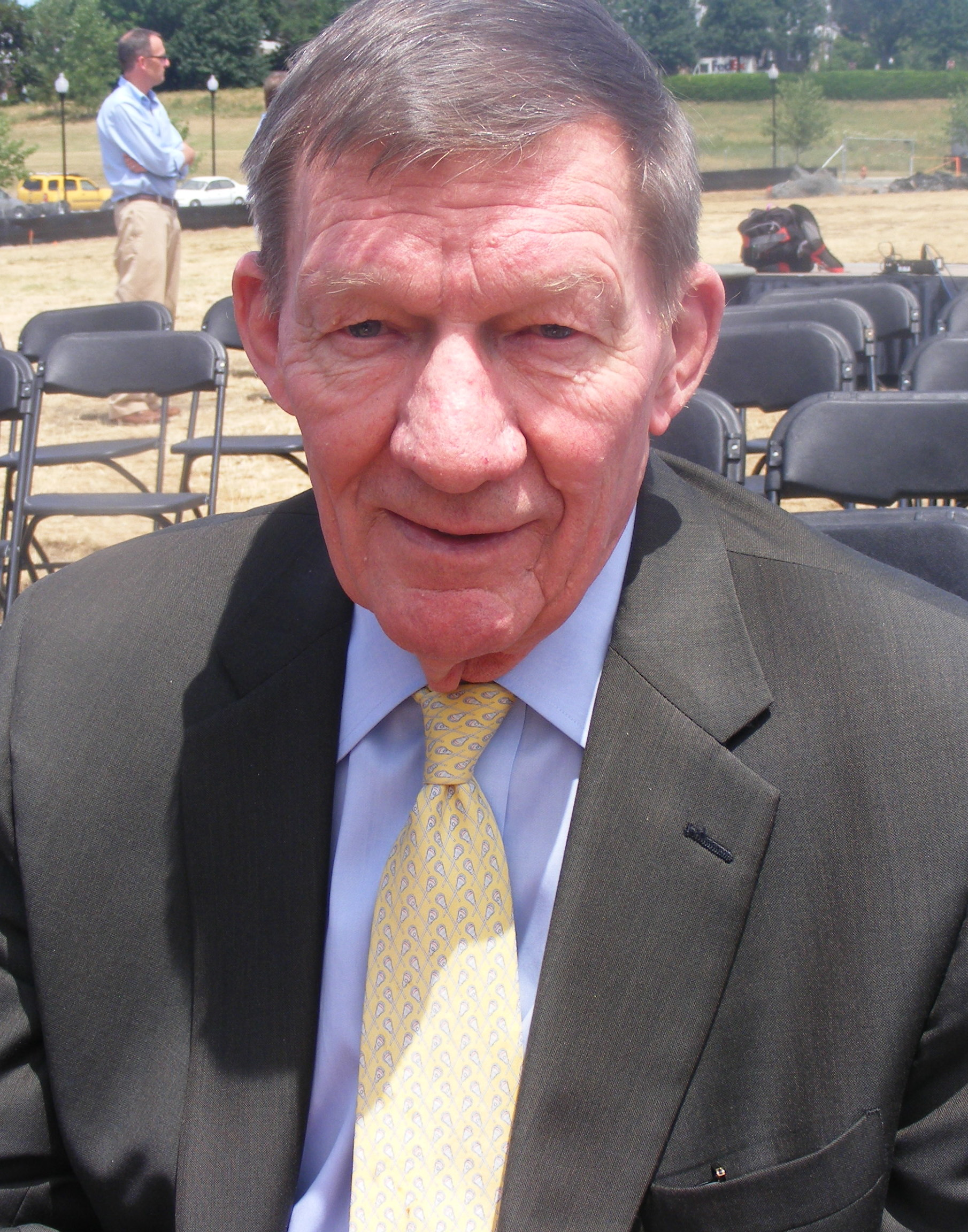
- Mutscheller in 2010

No. 84
- Positions: Tight end, Defensive end

Personal information
- Born: March 31, 1930; Beaver Falls, Pennsylvania, U.S.
- Died: April 10, 2015 (aged 85); Towson, Maryland, U.S.
- Listed height: 6 ft 1 in (1.85 m)
- Listed weight: 205 lb (93 kg)

Career information
- High school: Beaver Falls
- College: Notre Dame (1948–1951)
- NFL draft: 1952: 12th round, 134th overall pick

Career history

Playing
- Baltimore Colts (1954–1961)

Coaching
- Baltimore Colts (1963) Offensive ends coach

Awards and highlights
- 2× NFL champion (1958, 1959); Second-team All-Pro (1957); Pro Bowl (1957); NFL receiving touchdowns leader (1957); National champion (1949); Second-team All-American (1951)

Career NFL statistics
- Receptions: 220
- Receiving yards: 3,684
- Receiving touchdowns: 40
- Stats at Pro Football Reference

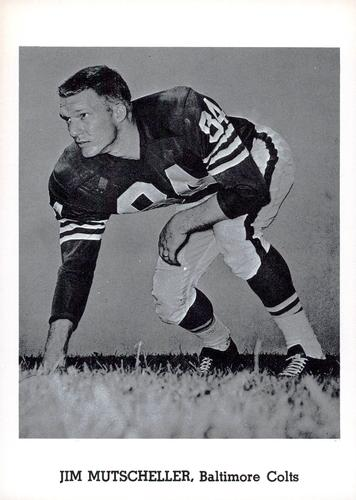
Mutscheller in 1960

James "Bucky" Mutscheller (/ˈmʌtʃɛlər/ MUTCH-el-ər; March 31, 1930 – April 10, 2015) was an American professional football player who played tight end and split end for nine seasons with the Baltimore Colts of the National Football League (NFL). He played college football for the Notre Dame Fighting Irish.

Among the most effective if not underrated pass catchers-run blockers of his era, Mutscheller was a starter for the legendary 1958-59 Colts teams that captured the first two NFL championships in franchise history. He led the league in touchdown receptions (eight) in the 1957 season, which marked the only Pro Bowl selection of his career.

== Early life ==
Mutscheller was born on March 31, 1930, in Beaver Falls, Pennsylvania. He played football, basketball and baseball at Beaver Falls High School. In the first football game of the 1947 season, Mutscheller had a 49-yard touchdown reception and 77-yard touchdown run in a game against Erie East High School, played before 7,000 spectators.

Mutscheller was commonly known as "Bucky" from the time he was in high school. In 1976, he was inducted into the Beaver County Sports Hall of Fame.

== College career ==
Mutscheller played three seasons of football at University of Notre Dame under coach College Football Hall of Fame head coach Frank Leahy from 1949 to 1951. He was a member of the 1949 national championship team. Mutscheller played both defensive end and offensive end for the Fighting Irish. His principal role was on defense for the 1949 national championship team, having only two pass receptions (eighth on the team); with Heisman Trophy winner Leon Hart Notre Dame's main receiver that season, setting a school record with 19 receptions. As a junior in 1950, only one player surpassed Mutscheller in minutes played (Jerry Groom who played almost 60 minutes per game). Mutscheller led Notre Dame in pass receptions as a junior and senior. As a junior he set Notre Dame records for most receptions (35) and receiving yards (426). He also had seven receiving touchdowns. He had 20 receptions for 305 yards as a senior, but was hampered by injury. Mutscheller served as team captain his senior year.

Mutscheller was selected to play in the East-West Shrine Game, but he suffered a knee injury in Notre Dame's final game of the season against the University of Southern California and had to be replaced. As a senior, the United Press named him second-team end on its All-Midwest team.

== Military service career ==
After college, Mutscheller served in the United States Marine Corps. He played organized football while a Marine for the Quantico Marines Devil Dogs. The Quantico Marines competed against collegiate teams, as well as other military teams. Mutscheller caught three touchdown passes in a November 1952 game against Holy Cross. His Quantico Marine football teammates included, among others, future NFL players Ray Wietecha, Jim Weatherall, and Ken Huxhold. In December 1952, he was selected to the Armed Forces Press Service (AFPS) All-Star Team at offensive end. He spent two years in the Marines, reaching the rank of lieutenant or captain, and was at times stationed in Korea and Japan.

== Professional football ==
Mutscheller was drafted by the NFL's New York Yanks in the 12th round of the January 1952 NFL draft (134th overall). They selected future Hall of Fame defensive end Gino Marchetti in the second round. Mutscheller never played for the Yanks both because he was in the Marines in 1952, and the Yanks ceased to exist as an NFL team before the 1952 season began.

In 1952, the newly formed Dallas Texans purchased the defunct Yanks from the NFL. The Texans played one year in the NFL (1952), without Mutscheller, before also failing financially. At the urging of NFL Commissioner Bert Bell, Carroll Rosenbloom purchased the Texans and established the team as the Baltimore Colts in 1953. Among the Texans players moving to Baltimore were future Hall of Fame defensive linemen Gino Marchetti and Art Donovan, and running back Buddy Young, who would go on to become the NFL's first African American executive.

Mutscheller signed with the Texans in June, 1952 but did not play for them in 1952 as he was in the Marines. He was on the Texans' reserve list when Rosenbloom purchased the Texan assets. Mutscheller signed on to play for the Colts in February 1954, for $5,000 a year; joining the team after his military service ended at the beginning of August 1954. Future Hall of Fame Colts head coach Weeb Ewbank intended to use Mutscheller as a receiver.

At the end of training camp in 1954, Ewbank was considering cutting Mutscheller from the team but not before he asked the veteran players about him. Donovan and Marchetti supported keeping Mutscheller with the Colts, Marchetti saying "'He was too valuable to let go'". Mutscheller joined the Colts in 1954 and played his entire career in Baltimore (1954–61), missing only one game during his eight year career. He was the Colts starting tight end, playing on the right side of the line, for seven seasons (1955–61).

As a rookie in 1954, Mutscheller played very little and started only three games. He saw action primarily at defensive end and had only one reception for 49 yards overall. In 1955, he was moved to tight end on offense and caught 33 passes for 518 yards and seven touchdowns, leading the Colts in all three categories. He was tied for fifth in the NFL in touchdown receptions. Future Hall of Fame receiver Raymond Berry, and 1954 Heisman Trophy winner Alan Ameche also joined the Colts in 1955 (Ameche leading the NFL in rushing yards and touchdowns).

In 1956, Mutscheller had 44 receptions for 715 yards and six touchdowns, again leading the Colts in all three categories. He was fourth in the NFL in receiving yards and receiving touchdowns, fifth in receptions, and 10th in yards per reception (16.3). 1956 was also legendary Hall of Fame quarterback Johnny Unitas's first year with the Colts, starting in seven games. Hall of Fame runner and receiver Lenny Moore likewise joined the Colts in 1956.

The Colts had their first winning record in 1957, 7–5. Unitas led the NFL in passing attempts, yards, yards per pass and touchdowns; and Berry led the team with 47 receptions, Moore had 40 and Mutscheller was tied with L. G. Dupre at 32. In 1957, Mutscheller was chosen to play in the Pro Bowl for the first and only time. The Newspaper Enterprise Association and United Press International named him second-team All-NFL.

The Colts were 1958 NFL champions. Berry led the team, and the league, with 56 receptions; Moore had 50 and Mutscheller had 28. Moore’s 18.8 yards per reception was seventh best in the NFL, and Mutscheller’s 18 yards per reception was eighth.

=== 1958 championship game ===
Mutscheller was a key part of the 1958 NFL championship game between the Colts and the New York Giants, known as "the Greatest Game Ever Played". It was the first NFL championship game to be decided in sudden death overtime, with the Colts winning 23–17 on a game-ending one-yard run by Alan Ameche. It was a close, captivating and dramatic game, viewed by 45 million people, and had an enormous impact on the popularity of professional football in the United States. Mutscheller had a "pivotal" reception on the play preceding the final touchdown.

Along with Mutscheller at tight end, the Colts offense included Unitas at quarterback, Berry at wide receiver, Moore at running back and flanker and Ameche at fullback, among others. The final drive of overtime started at the Colts 20 yard line. Unitas moved the team down the field with passes to Berry and two long runs by Ameche, until the Colts were inside the Giants' ten yard line. Unitas surprisingly threw a pass for six yards to Mutscheller, who slid on the icy field and went out of bounds at the Giants' 1 yard line, setting up the final touchdown run. On Ameche's touchdown run itself, as a blocker Mutscheller and right tackle George Preas opened the space through which Ameche ran. Overall, Mutscheller had three receptions for 46 yards that day. Unitas would later tease Mutscheller about trying to make him a hero by catching the game-winning pass, but Mutscheller went out of bounds one yard short and lost his chance at fame (with Mutscheller later being happy it was Alan Ameche, and not him, who would appear on the Ed Sullivan Show to be honored for the victory).

In 1959, the Colts defeated the Giants again in the NFL Championship Game, 31–16. Berry again led the NFL in receptions (66), Moore had 47 and Mutscheller 44. Mutscheller was third in the NFL in touchdown receptions (8), fifth in receptions, and eighth in receiving yards (699). He had five receptions for 40 yards in the championship game.

Knee problems slowed Mutscheller in the 1960-61 seasons and led to his retirement. In 1960, Mutscheller missed his only game as a Colt, and started only nine games. Toward the end of the 1960 season, he was described by Cameron Snyder of The Baltimore Sun as among the "walking wounded". He had 18 receptions for 271 yards and two touchdowns. 1961 was his last year in the NFL. He started all 12 games, with 20 receptions for 370 yards and two touchdowns. Mutscheller retired in April 1962, not satisfied that he could perform any longer to the standards he expected of himself.

== NFL career statistics ==
Legend
	Won the NFL championship
	Led the league
**Bold**	Career high

=== Regular season ===
Year	Team	Games		Receiving				
Year	Team	GP	GS	Rec	Yds	Avg	Lng	TD
1954	BAL	12	3	1	49	**49.0**	49	0
1955	BAL	12	12	33	518	15.7	48	7
1956	BAL	12	12	**44**	**715**	16.3	53	6
1957	BAL	12	11	32	558	17.4	**66**	**8**
1958	BAL	12	12	28	504	18.0	54	7
1959	BAL	12	12	**44**	699	15.9	40	**8**
1960	BAL	11	9	18	271	15.1	43	2
1961	BAL	12	12	20	370	18.5	45	2
		95	83	220	3,684	16.7	66	40

=== Playoffs ===
Year	Team	Games		Receiving				
Year	Team	GP	GS	Rec	Yds	Avg	Lng	TD
1958	BAL	1	1	3	**46**	**15.3**	**32**	0
1959	BAL	1	1	**5**	40	8.0	15	0
		2	2	8	86	10.8	32	0

== Legacy and honors ==
During his Colts' career (1954–61), Mutscheller amassed 220 catches, 3,685 receiving yards, and 40 touchdowns. Raymond Berry, Mutscheller's Hall of Fame teammate for seven years and later an NFL head coach, said he never saw Mutscheller drop a pass. Berry found Mutscheller honest, of the highest character, and a total team player, never driven by his ego. As a tight end, he was considered sure-handed and a fierce blocker. Mutscheller's wife Joan reported after his death that Mutscheller's proudest moment as a football player came when his block in the 1958 championship game helped open up a hole in the Giants' defensive line for Ameche to score the game-winning touchdown.

In 1976, Mutscheller was inducted into the inaugural class of the Beaver County Sports Hall of Fame. In 2007, he was inducted into the Western Chapter of the Pennsylvania Sports Hall of Fame, and in 2008, was inducted into the Pennsylvania Sports Hall of Fame.

== Media ==
After retiring, he served as a color commentator for CBS during televised Colts games, alongside play-by-play broadcaster Chuck Thompson, until replaced by Lenny Moore in 1968. He also had a weekly column about the Colts in the Baltimore News American.

== Personal life ==
In 1956, Mutscheller began working as an insurance salesman in Baltimore, and continued in that business almost until his death over 50 years later.

== Death ==
He died of kidney failure on April 10, 2015 in Towson, Maryland at age 85. He was survived by his wife of 59 years, Joan Mutscheller, four sons and four grandchildren.
