= Ernie Danjean =

American gridiron football player (1934–1995)

No. 64, 54
- Position: Linebacker

Personal information
- Born: March 5, 1934; New Orleans, Louisiana, U.S.
- Died: June 19, 1995 (aged 61)
- Listed height: 6 ft 0 in (1.83 m)
- Listed weight: 230 lb (104 kg)

Career information
- High school: Behrman (New Orleans)
- College: Auburn (1953–1956)
- NFL draft: 1957: 19th round, 220th overall pick

Career history
- Green Bay Packers (1957); Hamilton Tiger-Cats (1959–1960); Calgary Stampeders (1960–1963)

Awards and highlights
- CFL East All-Star (1959

Career NFL statistics
- Fumble recoveries: 1
- Stats at Pro Football Reference

Ernie Danjean (March 5, 1934 – June 19, 1995) was a linebacker in the National Football League (NFL) and all-star in the Canadian Football League (CFL).

After playing college football Auburn University, Danjean was drafted 220th overall by the Green Bay Packers in the 19th round of the 1957 NFL draft and played that season with the team.

He moved to the CFL in 1959, playing for the Hamilton Tiger-Cats and being selected an All-Star on the strength of his 3 interceptions. He was traded to the Calgary Stampeders during the 1960 season when he played in only 3 games. But from 1961 to 1963, he played in 41 of 45 regular season games. In 1962, he had another interception and recovered 4 fumbles for a 9–6 team which lost the Western conference final.
