= Tobin Rote =

American football player (1928–2000)

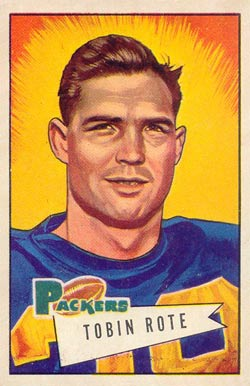
- Rote on a 1952 Bowman football card

No. 38, 18, 11
- Position: Quarterback

Personal information
- Born: January 18, 1928; San Antonio, Texas, U.S.
- Died: June 27, 2000 (aged 72); Saginaw, Michigan, U.S.
- Listed height: 6 ft 2 in (1.88 m)
- Listed weight: 211 lb (96 kg)

Career information
- High school: Harlandale (San Antonio)
- College: Rice (1946–1949)
- NFL draft: 1950: 2nd round, 17th overall pick

Career history
- Green Bay Packers (1950–1956); Detroit Lions (1957–1959); Toronto Argonauts (1960–1962); San Diego Chargers (1963–1964); Denver Broncos (1966)

Awards and highlights
- NFL champion (1957); AFL champion (1963); AFL MVP (1963); 2× Second-team All-Pro (1955, 1956); Pro Bowl (1956); AFL All-Star (1963); NFL passing yards leader (1956); 2× NFL passing touchdowns leader (1955, 1956); NFL passer rating leader (1952); AFL completion percentage leader (1963); AFL passer rating leader (1963); Green Bay Packers Hall of Fame

Career NFL/AFL statistics
- Passing attempts: 2,907
- Passing completions: 1,329
- Completion percentage: 45.7%
- TD–INT: 148–191
- Passing yards: 18,850
- Passer rating: 56.8
- Rushing yards: 3,128
- Rushing touchdowns: 37
- Stats at Pro Football Reference

Career CFL statistics
- Passing comp - att: 663 / 1,187 (55.9%)
- TD–INT: 66–58
- Passing yards: 9,872
- Rushing yards: 238
- Rushing touchdowns: 5

Tobin Cornelius Rote (January 18, 1928 – June 27, 2000) was an American professional football player who was a quarterback for the Green Bay Packers and Detroit Lions of the National Football League (NFL), the Toronto Argonauts of the Canadian Football League (CFL), and the San Diego Chargers and Denver Broncos of the American Football League (AFL). He played college football for the Rice Owls.

He was arguably the first dual-threat quarterback in NFL history.

== Early life ==
Born in San Antonio, to William Pemberton Rote Jr. (1891–1950) and Augusta Marie (Tietschert) Rote (1896–1969). Rote attended Harlandale High School in San Antonio and graduated in 1946. He was named "most athletic boy" by his classmates.

He is the cousin of former New York Giants receiver and sportscaster Kyle Rote, sharing paternal grandparents.

== College career ==
Rote played college football at Rice Institute in Houston, quarterbacking the Owls under head coach Jess Neely. As a senior in 1949, Rote led the Owls to a 10–1 season, capped by a 27–13 win over North Carolina in the Cotton Bowl in Dallas on January 2.

During the fourth game of the season in mid-October against rival SMU (that featured cousin Kyle Rote), he led the Owls back from a 14–0 deficit to a 41–27 win at the Cotton Bowl. The next week saw Rote lead a comeback against Texas, turning a 9–0 halftime deficit into a 17–15 win at Austin. With a flawless conference record, the Owls were outright Southwest Conference champions for the third time.

== Professional career ==
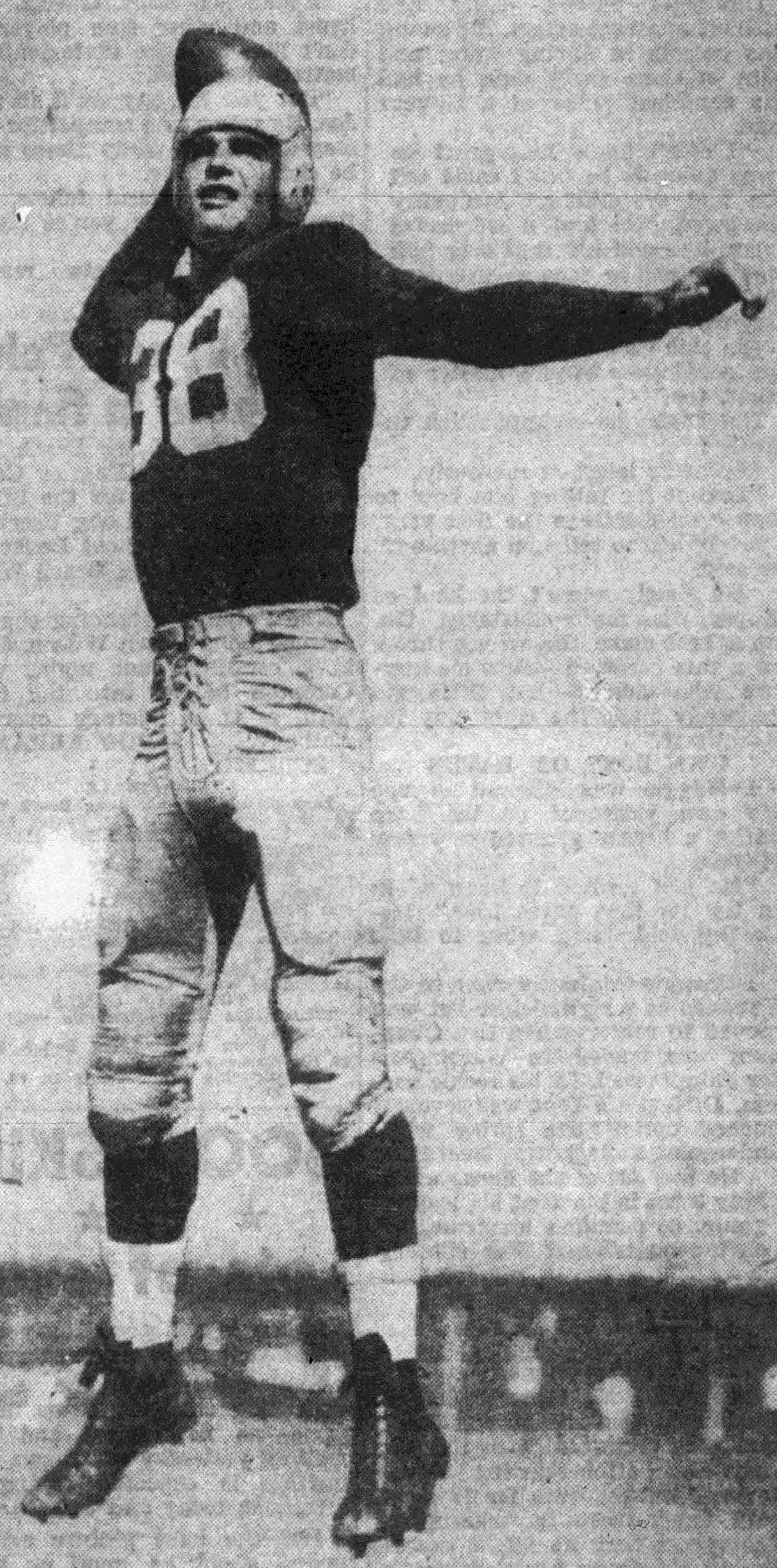
Rote with the Packers in 1951

=== Green Bay Packers ===
The Green Bay Packers selected Rote in the second round of the 1950 NFL draft, the 17th overall pick. He spent a total of seven seasons in Green Bay under head coaches Gene Ronzani and Lisle Blackbourn, leading the hapless Packers' offense while the defense annually ranked among the league's worst. On November 18, 1951, he set a record for rushing yards in one game by a quarterback (150) against the Chicago Bears that wasn't surpassed until 2002. Besides his passing duties, Rote led the Packers in rushing yards three times and rushing touchdowns five times. During the span of his Green Bay career, Rote ranked third in the NFL in passing touchdowns, trailing only Bobby Layne and Norm Van Brocklin. He also ranked first in the league in rushing yards by a quarterback and second in touchdowns. He was inducted into the Green Bay Packers Hall of Fame in 1974.

==== 1956 season ====
Rote's 1956 season ranks among the greatest in NFL history. On a 4–8 team, he led the league in passing yards (by 294) and passing touchdowns (18 to Ted Marchibroda's 12). In addition, his 11 rushing touchdowns were second in the league behind only those of Chicago Bears' Rick Casares. His 29 total touchdowns were the highest single-season total of his career, and the highest total in the era of the twelve-game schedule. The entire Packers' offense outside of Rote accounted for just five touchdowns.

Among quarterbacks, he led the league in pass completions, pass attempts, passing yards, passing touchdowns, rushing attempts, rushing yards, and rushing touchdowns.

=== Detroit Lions ===
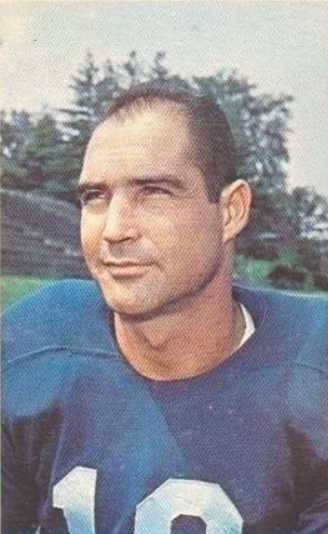
Rote in 1959 for the Lions

In late July 1957, Rote and defensive back Val Joe Walker were traded to the Detroit Lions for four players (halfback Don McIlhenny, offensive tackles Ollie Spencer and Norm Masters, and offensive guard Jim Salsbury).

Rote split time in 1957 with hall of famer Bobby Layne, although it was Rote who ended up with more passing touchdowns, fewer interceptions, more rushing yards, more rushing touchdowns, and a better won-lost record as a starter. Layne broke his ankle midway through the eleventh game, leaving Rote to guide the team to an NFL title. Detroit tied San Francisco for the division title, forcing a one-game playoff. Facing a 27–7 deficit in the third quarter, Rote led the Lions to a 31–27 comeback win and a date with the Cleveland Browns. In one of the greatest playoff performances in history, Rote led Detroit to a 59–14 thumping of the Browns. He completed 12 of 19 passes for 280 yards and 4 touchdowns, adding another touchdown on the ground.

Layne was traded to the Pittsburgh Steelers after the second game of the 1958 season, leaving Rote to guide the aging and rapidly declining Lions. Rote led the team in rushing, making it the fourth time in his career that he did so (an NFL record for quarterbacks). After a disastrous 1959 season (3–8–1), the Lions informed Rote that he would be released. Rather than retire, the ten-year veteran headed north of the border to the Toronto Argonauts of the Canadian Football League (CFL).

=== Toronto Argonauts ===
Rote's three seasons in the Canadian Football League with the Toronto Argonauts were quite eventful. He completed 662 of 1,187 passes for 9,872 yards and 62 TDs. His 38 TD passes in 1960 was an all-time CFL record. In Rote's first season with the Argos he became the CFL's second quarterback to exceed 4,000 yards passing in a season with 4,247. He also threw 38 touchdowns that season which was then a league record. Thanks to Rote's leadership the 10–4 Argonauts in 1960 accomplished something they had not done since 1937: finish in first place. However, they lost the conference final series to Ottawa Rough Riders who went on to win the Grey Cup. Rote's 108 yard pass to Jim Rountree in 1961 is still a team record, and in 1960 he threw seven touchdown passes in a game twice, a CFL record at the time. After the 1962 season, the Argonauts traded for future hall-of-fame QB Jackie Parker and Rote moved to the fledgling AFL.

=== San Diego Chargers ===
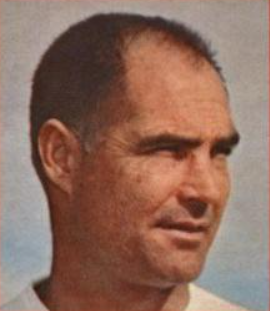
Rote in 1963

Looking for a quarterback to lead the team in 1963 while a young John Hadl developed, the San Diego Chargers of the American Football League (AFL) came calling. Rote was in his 14th pro season at age 35, but led the Chargers to an 11–3 record and the Western division title. For his part in directing the league's top offense, Rote was named first-team All-AFL and captured the Associated Press Player of the Year award. Proving that his 1957 NFL title performance was no fluke, he led the Chargers to a 51–10 win over the Boston Patriots in the 1963 AFL championship game. Individually, he accounted for 173 yards and 2 touchdowns on 10/15 passing, plus another 15 rushing yards and a touchdown on the ground.

In 1964, Hadl began receiving more playing time. The Chargers won the West again but with an 8–5–1 record, and the offense fell from first in the AFL to fourth; and lost three of four to finish the regular season. Rote was the starter for the AFL championship game on the road against the Buffalo Bills, but neither he nor Hadl could do much against the swarming defense without Hall of Fame receiver Lance Alworth (knee hyperextension) and running back Keith Lincoln, injured in the first quarter with a broken rib. Buffalo won 20–7, and Rote announced his retirement.

=== Denver Broncos ===
In 1966, Rote briefly came out of retirement to play for the Denver Broncos. Signed in late September after the winless Broncos lost their third game, he appeared in three games for a total of five minutes, completing three of eight passes; he was waived by the team after three games in mid-October.

== Career statistics ==
=== NFL/AFL ===
Legend
	Won the league championship
	Led the league
**Bold**	Career high

==== Regular season ====
Year	Team	Games			Passing									Rushing				
Year	Team	GP	GS	Record	Cmp	Att	Pct	Yds	Y/A	Lng	TD	Int	Rtg	Att	Yds	Avg	Lng	TD
1950	GNB	12	12	3–9	83	224	37.1	1,231	5.5	**96**	7	**24**	26.7	27	158	5.9	29	0
1951	GNB	12	11	3–8	106	256	41.4	1,540	6.0	85	15	20	48.6	76	**523**	**6.9**	**55**	3
1952	GNB	12	8	4–4	82	157	52.2	1,268	8.1	81	13	8	85.6	58	313	5.4	30	2
1953	GNB	12	7	2–4–1	72	185	38.9	1,005	5.4	80	5	15	32.4	33	180	5.5	21	0
1954	GNB	12	12	4–8	**180**	**382**	47.1	2,311	6.0	82	14	18	59.1	67	301	4.5	30	8
1955	GNB	12	12	6–6	157	342	45.9	1,977	5.8	60	17	19	57.8	74	332	4.5	49	5
1956	GNB	12	11	4–7	146	308	47.4	2,203	7.2	69	18	15	70.6	**84**	398	4.7	39	**11**
1957	DET	12	5	4–1	76	177	42.9	1,070	6.0	48	11	10	60.2	70	366	5.2	23	1
1958	DET	12	11	4–6–1	118	257	45.9	1,678	6.5	65	14	10	69.5	77	351	4.6	27	3
1959	DET	10	7	1–5–1	62	162	38.3	861	5.3	59	5	19	26.8	35	156	4.5	21	2
1963	SDG	14	14	**11–3**	170	286	**59.4**	**2,510**	**8.8**	85	**20**	17	**86.7**	24	62	2.6	15	2
1964	SDG	14	6	2–3–1	74	163	45.4	1,156	7.1	82	9	15	49.5	10	-12	-1.2	9	0
1966	DEN	3	0	–	3	8	37.5	40	5.0	20	0	1	14.6	0	0	0.0	0	0
Career		149	116	48–64–4	1,329	2,907	45.7	18,850	6.5	96	148	191	56.8	635	3,128	4.9	55	37

==== Playoffs ====
Year	Team	Games			Passing									Rushing				
Year	Team	GP	GS	Record	Cmp	Att	Pct	Yds	Y/A	Lng	TD	Int	Rtg	Att	Yds	Avg	Lng	TD
1957	DET	2	2	**2–0**	**28**	**49**	57.1	**494**	10.1	**78**	**5**	1	117.2	**11**	**32**	2.9	**17**	**1**
1963	SDG	1	1	1–0	10	15	**66.7**	173	**11.5**	48	2	0	**145.3**	4	15	3.8	10	**1**
1964	SDG	1	1	0–1	10	26	38.5	118	4.5	22	1	**2**	33.8	1	6	**6.0**	6	0
Career		4	4	3–1	48	90	53.3	785	8.7	78	8	3	98.6	16	53	3.3	17	2

=== CFL ===
Year	Team	Games		Passing						Rushing			
Year	Team	GP	GS	Cmp	Att	Pct	Yds	TD	Int	Att	Yds	Avg	TD
1960	TOR	14	–	256	450	56.9	4,247	38	25	23	42	1.8	1
1961	TOR	14	–	220	389	56.6	3,093	16	16	31	95	3.1	4
1962	TOR	13	–	187	348	53.7	2,532	12	17	25	101	4	0
Career		41	–	663	1,187	55.9	9,872	66	58	79	238	3.0	5

== Legacy ==
- Led the NFL in rushing yards by a quarterback six times (1951, 1954–58)
- Led the NFL in passing yards once (1956)
- Led the NFL in passing touchdowns twice (1955 and 1956)
- Rote was the only quarterback to lead his team to both an NFL and AFL championship.
- At the time he retired, Rote had more rushing yards than any quarterback in NFL history. As of 2024, he ranks fourteenth all-time.
- Rote's 21.0 yards/game rushing average is seventh all-time among quarterbacks with at least 2,000 career passes.
- Rote's 37 career rushing touchdowns ranks sixth all-time among quarterbacks.
- Rote is one of two quarterbacks to lead his team in rushing four times.

In 2005, he was named to the Professional Football Researchers Association Hall of Very Good in the association's third HOVG class.

== Death ==
Rote died at age 72 in Saginaw, Michigan from a heart attack on June 27, 2000. In his last 18 months, he had undergone open heart surgery and back surgery. He was survived by wife Julie, former wife Betsy Todd and children Tobin Jr, Robin, Toni and Rock.

== See also ==
- List of American Football League players
