= 1957 Green Bay Packers season =

1957 Green Bay Packers football season

- General manager: Verne Lewellen
- Head coach: Lisle Blackbourn
- Home stadium: City Stadium; County Stadium (Milwaukee)

Results
- Record: 3–9
- Division place: 6th NFL Western
- Playoffs: Did not qualify

The 1957 Green Bay Packers season was their 39th season overall and their 37th season in the National Football League. After a week one win against the Chicago Bears, The team finished with a 3–9 record under fourth-year head coach Lisle Blackbourn and finished last in the Western Conference. It was Blackbourn's final season at Green Bay, who was replaced by Ray McLean in January 1958 for just one year, characterized by even worse results. McLean was succeeded in 1959 by Vince Lombardi, who brought a change of fortune for the Packers.

The 1957 season also marked the Packers' move from City Stadium to new City Stadium, which was opened with a win over the Chicago Bears in week one on September 29. It was renamed Lambeau Field in August 1965 in memory of Packers founder, player, and long-time head coach, Curly Lambeau, who had died two months earlier.

== Offseason ==
=== NFL draft ===
Round	Pick	Player	Position	School/club team
1	1	Paul Hornung	Halfback	Notre Dame
1	4	Ron Kramer	End	Michigan
2	18	Joel Wells	Back	Clemson
3	29	Dalton Truax	Tackle	Tulane
4	41	Carl Vereen	Offensive tackle	Georgia Tech
6	70	John Nisby	Guard	Pacific
7	76	Frank Gilliam	End	Iowa
8	87	George Belotti	Center	USC
9	100	Ken Wineberg	Back	TCU
10	111	Gary Gustafson	Guard	Gustavus Adolphus
11	124	Jim Roseboro	Back	Ohio State
12	135	Ed Sullivan	Center	Notre Dame
12	145	Glenn Bestor	Back	Wisconsin
13	148	Jim Morse	Back	Notre Dame
14	159	Rudy Schoendorf	Tackle	Miami (OH)
15	172	Pat Hinton	Guard	Louisiana Tech
16	183	Ed Buckingham	Tackle	Minnesota
17	196	Don Boudreaux	Tackle	Houston
18	207	Credell Green	Back	Washington
19	220	Ernie Danjean	Guard	Auburn
20	231	Percy Oliver	Guard	Illinois
21	244	Chuck Mehrer	Tackle	Missouri
22	255	Ronnie Quillian	Quarterback	Tulane
23	268	John Symank	Defensive back	Florida
24	279	Charlie Leyendecker	Tackle	SMU
25	292	Jerry Johnson	Tackle	St. Norbert
26	303	Buddy Bass	End	Duke
27	316	Marty Booher	Tackle	Wisconsin
28	327	Dave Herbold	Guard	Minnesota
29	340	Howie Dare	Back	Maryland

- Green indicates a future Pro Football Hall of Fame inductee
- Yellow indicates a future Pro Bowl selection

== Regular season ==
=== Schedule ===
Week	Date	Opponent	Result	Record	Venue	Attendance
1	September 29	**Chicago Bears**	**W** 21–17	1–0	City Stadium	32,132
2	October 6	**Detroit Lions**	**L** 14–24	1–1	City Stadium	32,120
3	October 13	**Baltimore Colts**	**L** 17–45	1–2	Milwaukee County Stadium	26,322
4	October 20	**San Francisco 49ers**	**L** 14–24	1–3	Milwaukee County Stadium	18,919
5	October 27	at **Baltimore Colts**	**W** 24–21	2–3	Memorial Stadium	48,510
6	November 3	New York Giants	**L** 17–31	2–4	City Stadium	32,070
7	November 10	at **Chicago Bears**	**L** 14–21	2–5	Wrigley Field	47,153
8	November 17	**Los Angeles Rams**	**L** 27–31	2–6	Milwaukee County Stadium	19,540
9	November 24	at Pittsburgh Steelers	**W** 27–10	3–6	Forbes Field	29,701
10	November 28	at **Detroit Lions**	**L** 6–18	3–7	Briggs Stadium	54,301
11	December 8	at **Los Angeles Rams**	**L** 17–42	3–8	Los Angeles Memorial Coliseum	70,572
12	December 15	at **San Francisco 49ers**	**L** 20–27	3–9	Kezar Stadium	59,100
Note: Intra-conference opponents are in **bold** text.

c

=== Season summary ===
==== Week 1 vs Bears ====
Week One: Chicago Bears (0–0) at Green Bay Packers (0–0)

Quarter	1	2	3	4	Total
Bears	7	7	3	0	**17**
**Packers**	0	14	0	7	**21**

at New City Stadium, Green Bay, Wisconsin

- Date: September 29
- Game attendance: 32,132
- Box Score

Game information

**First quarter**

- CHI – Ed Brown 5-yard run (George Blanda kick). Bears 7–0. Drive:

**Second quarter**

- GB – Billy Howton 37-yard pass from Babe Parilli (Fred Cone kick). Tie 7–7. Drive:
- CHI – Harlon Hill 11-yard pass from Ed Brown (George Blanda kick). Bears 14–7. Drive:
- GB – Fred Cone 1-yard run (Fred Cone kick). Tie 14–14. Drive:

**Third quarter**

- CHI – George Blanda 13-yard field goal. Bears 17–14. Drive:

**Fourth quarter**

- GB – Gary Knafelc 4-yard pass from Babe Parilli (Fred Cone kick). Packers 21–17. Drive:

Top passers

- CHI – Ed Brown – 12/24, 197 yards, TD, 4 INT
- GB – Babe Parilli – 9/17, 197 yards, 2 TD, INT

Top rushers

- CHI – Rick Casares – 18 rushes, 72 yards
- GB – Fred Cone – 20 rushes, 52 yards, TD

Top receivers

- CHI – Bill McColl – 4 receptions, 84 yards
- GB – Billy Howton — 8 receptions, 165 yards, TD

First game at New City Stadium

=== Standings ===
NFL Western Conference
	W	L	T	PCT	CONF	PF	PA	STK
Detroit Lions	8	4	0	.667	6–4	251	231	W3
San Francisco 49ers	8	4	0	.667	7–3	260	264	W3
Baltimore Colts	7	5	0	.583	6–4	303	235	L2
Los Angeles Rams	6	6	0	.500	5–5	307	278	W2
Chicago Bears	5	7	0	.417	4–6	203	211	L1
Green Bay Packers	3	9	0	.250	2–8	218	311	L3

Note: Tie games were not officially counted in the standings until 1972.

== Roster ==
1957 Green Bay Packers final roster
Quarterbacks: 10 Babe Parilli; 15 Bart Starr; Running backs: 48 Al Carmichael; 31 Fred Cone K; 37 Howie Ferguson; 5 Paul Hornung; 40 Joe Johnson; 42 Don McIlhenny; 33 Frank Purnell; Receivers: 86 Billy Howton; 88 Ron Kramer; 85 Max McGee	Offensive linemen: 62 Norm Amundsen G; 66 Al Barry G; 58 Larry Lauer C; 78 Norm Masters T; 51 Jim Ringo C; 67 Jim Salsbury G; 77 Ollie Spencer T; 74 Carl Vereen T; Defensive linemen: 71 Tom Finnin; 79 Dave Hanner; 72 Jerry Helluin; 81 Carlton Massey; 82 Jim Temp	Linebackers: 65 Tom Bettis OLB; 64 Ernie Danjean MLB; 69 Bill Forester OLB; 53 Sam Palumbo MLB; Defensive backs: 44 Bobby Dillon S; 46 Hank Gremminger CB; 25 Billy Kinard CB/S; 20 John Petitbon CB; 27 John Symank S; Special teams: 80 Dick Deschaine	Reserve list: 87 Nate Borden DE (IR); -- Hank Bullough G (Military); -- Forrest Gregg G/T (Military); -- Mike Hudock C (IR); 84 Gary Knafelc WR (IR); -- Jack Losch RB (Military); -- Doyle Nix CB (Military); 63 Joe Skibinski G (IR); -- Bob Skoronski T (Military); -- Veryl Switzer RB/CB (Military); Rookies in italics
