= 1957 Los Angeles Rams season =

NFL team season

- General manager: Tex Schramm
- Head coach: Sid Gillman
- Home stadium: Los Angeles Memorial Coliseum

Results
- Record: 6–6
- Division place: 4th NFL Western
- Playoffs: Did not qualify

Uniform
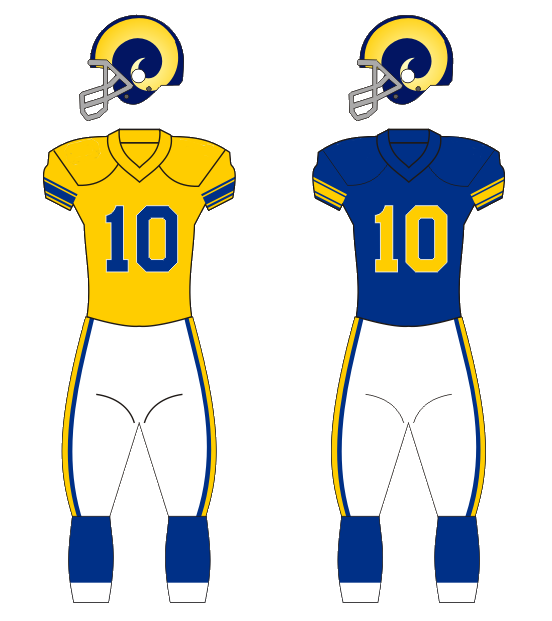

The 1957 Los Angeles Rams season was the team's 20th year with the National Football League and the 12th season in Los Angeles.

== Season highlights ==
The Los Angeles Rams set an all-time National Football League attendance record in 1957, playing before a total of 1,051,106 fans in a total of 19 home and away games, including pre-season contests. This attendance total exceeded any previous cumulative total for an American football team at any level of competition, including the college and professional levels. Topping the one game record, the team drew an astounding 102,368 fans to the Los Angeles Memorial Coliseum to see a November 10 contest between the Rams and their in-state rivals, the San Francisco 49ers.

The 1957 season would be the last in a Rams uniform for quarterback and punter Norm Van Brocklin, the team's starting signal caller since 1950. Van Brocklin passed for 20 touchdowns on the year, gaining 2,105 yards in the air, but gave up 21 costly interceptions, contributing to the team's 4th-place finish in the Western Conference. The team also parted ways at the end of the 1957 season with top receiver Elroy Hirsch, a veteran of 9 NFL seasons.

Defensively, the Rams limited their opponents to nearly 300 fewer yards on the ground and 75 yards via the pass than the totals put up by themselves. The pass defense was headed by linebacker Les Richter, who led the team with 4 interceptions.

== Schedule ==
Week	Date	Opponent	Result	Record	Venue	Attendance
1	September 29	Philadelphia Eagles	**W** 17–13	1–0	Los Angeles Memorial Coliseum	62,506
2	October 6	at **San Francisco 49ers**	**L** 20–23	1–1	Kezar Stadium	59,637
3	October 13	at **Detroit Lions**	**L** 10–7	1–2	Briggs Stadium	55,914
4	October 20	at **Chicago Bears**	**L** 34–26	1–3	Wrigley Field	47,337
5	October 27	**Detroit Lions**	**W** 35–17	2–3	Los Angeles Memorial Coliseum	77,314
6	November 3	**Chicago Bears**	**L** 10–16	2–4	Los Angeles Memorial Coliseum	80,456
7	November 10	**San Francisco 49ers**	**W** 37–24	3–4	Los Angeles Memorial Coliseum	102,368
8	November 17	at Green Bay Packers	**W** 31–27	4–4	Milwaukee County Stadium	19,540
9	November 24	at Cleveland Browns	**L** 31–45	4–5	Cleveland Municipal Stadium	65,407
10	December 1	at **Baltimore Colts**	**L** 14–31	4–6	Memorial Stadium	52,060
11	December 8	Green Bay Packers	**W** 42–17	5–6	Los Angeles Memorial Coliseum	70,572
12	December 15	**Baltimore Colts**	**W** 37–21	6–6	Los Angeles Memorial Coliseum	52,560
Note: Intra-conference opponents are in **bold** text.

=== Standings ===
NFL Western Conference
	W	L	T	PCT	CONF	PF	PA	STK
Detroit Lions	8	4	0	.667	6–4	251	231	W3
San Francisco 49ers	8	4	0	.667	7–3	260	264	W3
Baltimore Colts	7	5	0	.583	6–4	303	235	L2
Los Angeles Rams	6	6	0	.500	5–5	307	278	W2
Chicago Bears	5	7	0	.417	4–6	203	211	L1
Green Bay Packers	3	9	0	.250	2–8	218	311	L3

Note: Tie games were not officially counted in the standings until 1972.

== Final roster ==
1957 Los Angeles Rams roster
Quarterbacks (QB): 11 Norm Van Brocklin P; 9 Bill Wade; Running backs (RB): 26 Jon Arnett WR; 34 Joe Marconi; 27 Ron Waller; 24 Tommy Wilson; 35 Tank Younger; Wide receivers (WR): 82 Bob Boyd; 84 Leon Clarke; 40 Elroy Hirsch; 85 Lamar Lundy DE; Tight ends (TE)	Offensive linemen (OL): 75 Bob Fry T; 58 Bob Griffin C; 63 John Hock G; 79 Glenn Holtzman T/DE; 62 John Houser G/C; 73 Ken Panfil T; 61 Duane Putnam G; Defensive linemen (DL): 71 Frank Fuller DT; 65 Art Hauser DT; 81 Paul Miller DE; 80 Billy Ray Smith DE	Linebackers (LB): 50 Dick Daugherty OLB; 57 Bob Dougherty OLB; 31 Larry Morris OLB; 32 Jack Pardee OLB; 48 Les Richter MLB; Defensive backs (DB): 21 Alex Bravo S; 25 Don Burroughs S; 23 Jesse Castete S/CB; 43 Will Sherman S; 29 Del Shofner CB; 47 Corky Taylor CB; 44 Jesse Whittenton CB; Special teams (ST): 36 Paige Cothren K	Reserve: -- Bob Carey WR (Retired); -- Gene Mitcham WR (IR); -- John Morrow C/G (Military); -- Darryl Rogers WR (Military); 77 George Strugar DT (IR); -- A. D. Williams WR (Military); Rookies in italics
