= Steve Junker =

American football player (1935–2023)

No. 88, 80
- Position: End

Personal information
- Born: July 22, 1935; Cincinnati, Ohio, U.S.
- Died: December 13, 2023 (aged 88); Ohio, U.S.
- Listed height: 6 ft 3 in (1.91 m)
- Listed weight: 217 lb (98 kg)

Career information
- High school: Elder (Cincinnati)
- College: Xavier
- NFL draft: 1957: 4th round, 48th overall pick

Career history
- Detroit Lions (1957–1960); Washington Redskins (1961–1962)

Awards and highlights
- NFL champion (1957); First-team All-Ohio (1956)

Career NFL statistics
- Receptions: 48
- Receiving yards: 639
- Receiving touchdowns: 6
- Stats at Pro Football Reference

Stephen Norbert Junker (July 22, 1935 – December 13, 2023) was an American professional football player. He played in the National Football League (NFL) for the Detroit Lions (1957, 1959–1960) and the Washington Redskins (1961–1962). As a rookie, he caught eight passes for 95 yards and a touchdown in the Lions' divisional playoff game against the San Francisco 49ers. He also had two touchdown catches in the Lions' victory over the Cleveland Browns in the 1957 NFL Championship Game. He missed the 1958 season after sustaining a knee injury and never fully recovered from his knee injuries.

Junker also played college football at Xavier University from 1953 to 1956. In 1956, he was inducted into Xavier's "Legion of Honor" and was selected as a second-team end on the Associated Press' small college All-America football team and a first-team player on the International News Service's All-Ohio team. He was also selected to play in the 1956 East–West Shrine Game and the August 1957 Chicago College All-Star Game.

== Early life ==
Junker was born in 1935 in Cincinnati, Ohio. He attended Elder High School in that city.

== College football ==
Junker enrolled at Xavier University and played college football as a linebacker and end for the Xavier Musketeers football team from 1953 to 1956. In 1956, he was inducted into Xavier's "Legion of Honor", the highest award Xavier bestowed on its athletes. Also at the end of the 1956 season, Junker was named by the Associated Press as a second-team end on its small college All-America football team, and a first-team player on the International News Service's All-Ohio team. He was also selected to play in the 1956 East–West Shrine Game. In the August 1957 Chicago College All-Star Game, Junker starred for the college all-stars.

== Professional football ==
Junker was drafted by the Detroit Lions in the fourth round (48th overall pick) of the 1957 NFL draft. As a rookie in 1957, he caught 22 passes for 305 yards and four touchdowns in the regular season. He then blossomed in the playoffs. In the divisional playoff against the San Francisco 49ers, Junker caught eight passes for 92 yards, one of them for a touchdown. In the 1957 NFL Championship Game, he was the Lions leading scorer with 12 points and caught five passes, including touchdown receptions covering 26 and 23 yards.

Junker suffered a knee injury in an Xavier alumni football game in the spring of 1958. Junker later recalled that, despite four knee surgeries, "The knee just never quite came back." As a result of the injury, he missed the entire 1958 NFL season.

Junker returned to the Lions in 1959, but he continued to be hampered by his bad knee and had no catches. During the Lions' pre-season camp in 1960, Junker impressed observers and led to his being "hailed as the 'comeback star' of 1960." However, he managed only six catches for 55 yards during the 1960 regular season.

In September 1961, the Lions traded Junker to the Washington Redskins in exchange for Johnny Olszewski. He played for the Redskins in 1961 and 1962, totaling 20 catches for 279 yards.

== Later years and death ==
In 1963, after retiring from football, Junker began a long association with Wilson Realty Co. in the Cincinnati area. He remained with the company through at least 1976. He later formed his own company known as Steve Junker Realty. He also worked for a time in the mid-1960s as a scout for the Atlanta Falcons and later for the Dallas Cowboys. He died on December 13, 2023, at the age of 88.
