= 1957 San Francisco 49ers season =

American football team season

- Owner: Tony Morabito
- General manager: Louis Spadia
- Head coach: Frankie Albert
- Home stadium: Kezar Stadium

Results
- Record: 8–4
- Division place: T–1st NFL Western
- Playoffs: Lost Conference Playoff (vs. Lions) 27–31

The 1957 San Francisco 49ers season was the team's eighth season in the NFL. Coming off a 5–6–1 record in 1956, the 49ers tied for the best record in the Western Conference at 8–4.

== Organizational history ==
San Francisco continued their late-season success from the previous year, and won five of their first six games, and were in first place in the West midway through the season. The Niners then lost three straight on the road to drop to 5–4, but then won the final three games to close out the season at 8–4, their best season since 1953.

The 49ers tied with the Detroit Lions at the top of the Western Conference, and split their two regular-season games in November, with the home teams winning. This forced a tie-breaking playoff game at Kezar Stadium on December 22. The winner would host the Eastern Conference champion Cleveland Browns for the NFL championship the following week.

The 49ers built a 24–7 lead at halftime, and extended it to twenty points in the third quarter. Detroit's hall of fame quarterback Bobby Layne had been lost for the season two weeks earlier, and backup Tobin Rote lead the Lions' rally, scoring 24 unanswered points in the second half to win, 31–27, which ended the 49ers' season.

Eight weeks earlier on October 27, 49ers' owner Tony Morabito, age 47, suffered a heart attack in the press box at Kezar during the second quarter of the game against the Chicago Bears. He died shortly after arriving at Mary's Help Hospital on Guerrero Street. The team was notified of his death at halftime, and with tears in their eyes, they went back out and won a come-from-behind victory.

Quarterback Y. A. Tittle had another strong season for the 49ers, completing 63.1% of his passes for 2,157 yards and 13 TD's. He also rushed for 6 TD's. End Billy Wilson led the club with 52 receptions for 757 yards, along with a team high 6 TD's. Running back Hugh McElhenny led in rushing with 478 yards on 102 attempts.

The 1957 season was the first in 49er franchise history in which the team broke even financially.

== Offseason ==
=== NFL draft ===
1957 San Francisco 49ers draft
Round	Pick	Player	Position	College	Notes
1	3	John Brodie *	Quarterback	Stanford	
2	15	Abe Woodson *	Defensive back	Illinois	began play with 49ers in 1958
4	39	Jimmy Ridlon	Defensive back	Syracuse	
4	46	Mike Sandusky *	Guard	Maryland	
5	57	Karl Rubke	Linebacker	USC	
6	62	Bill Rhodes	Back	Western State (CO)	
6	68	Jim Hunter	Back	Missouri	
7	80	Fred Dugan	End	Dayton	began play with 49ers in 1958.
8	92	Ernie Pitts	End	Denver	signed with Winnipeg Blue Bombers (WIFU)
9	104	Charlie Brueckman	Linebacker	Pittsburgh	
10	116	Jerry Hurst	End	Middle Tennessee	
11	128	Tommy Davis *	Kicker	LSU	began play with 49ers in 1959.
12	140	Fred Sington	Tackle	Alabama	
13	152	Charley Mackey	End	Arizona State	
14	164	Ron Warzeka	Defensive tackle	Montana State	
15	176	Earl Kaiser	Back	Houston	
16	188	Vic Kristopaitis	Back	Dayton	signed with Toronto Argonauts (IFRU)
17	200	Dave Kuhn	Center	Kentucky	
18	212	Dick Guy	Guard	Ohio State	
19	224	Gene Babb	Linebacker	Austin	
20	236	Sid DeLoatch	Guard	Duke	
21	248	Fred Wilcox	Back	Tulane	
22	260	Paul Tripp	Tackle	Idaho State	
23	272	John Thomas *	Guard	Pacific	began play with 49ers in 1958.
24	284	John Ladner	End	Wake Forest	
25	296	Ray Meyer	Back	Lamar Tech	
26	308	Tom Topping	Tackle	Duke	returned to Duke
27	320	Don Vicic	Back	Ohio State	signed with BC Lions (WIFU)
28	332	Bill Curtis	Back	TCU	
29	344	Vern Hallbeck	Back	TCU	
30	355	George Parks	Back	Lamar Tech	
Made roster * Made at least one Pro Bowl during career

== Preseason ==
Week	Date	Opponent	Result	Record	Venue
1	August 18	New York Giants	W 24–15	1–0	Kezar Stadium
2	August 25	Washington Redskins	W 27–20	2–0	Kezar Stadium
3	September 1	Cleveland Browns	W 21–17	3–0	Kezar Stadium
4	September 7	vs. Chicago Cardinals	W 27–21	4–0	Husky Stadium
5	September 13	at Los Angeles Rams	L 27–58	4–1	Los Angeles Memorial Coliseum
6	September 22	Philadelphia Eagles	W 17–14	5–1	Kezar Stadium

== Regular season ==
=== Schedule ===
Game	Date	Opponent	Result	Record	Venue	Attendance	Recap	Sources
1	September 29	Chicago Cardinals	**L** 10–20	0–1	Kezar Stadium	35,743	Recap	
2	October 6	**Los Angeles Rams**	**W** 23–20	1–1	Kezar Stadium	59,637	Recap	
3	October 13	at **Chicago Bears**	**W** 21–17	2–1	Wrigley Field	45,310	Recap	
4	October 20	at **Green Bay Packers**	**W** 24–14	3–1	Milwaukee County Stadium	18,919	Recap	
5	October 27	**Chicago Bears**	**W** 21–17	4–1	Kezar Stadium	56,693	Recap	
6	November 3	**Detroit Lions**	**W** 35–31	5–1	Kezar Stadium	59,702	Recap	
7	November 10	at **Los Angeles Rams**	**L** 24–37	5–2	L.A. Memorial Coliseum	102,368	Recap	
8	November 17	at **Detroit Lions**	**L** 10–31	5–3	Briggs Stadium	56,915	Recap	
9	November 24	at **Baltimore Colts**	**L** 21–27	5–4	Memorial Stadium	50,073	Recap	
10	December 1	at New York Giants	**W** 27–17	6–4	Yankee Stadium	54,121	Recap	
11	December 8	**Baltimore Colts**	**W** 17–13	7–4	Kezar Stadium	59,950	Recap	
12	December 15	**Green Bay Packers**	**W** 27–20	8–4	Kezar Stadium	59,100	Recap	
Note: Intra-conference opponents are in **bold** text.

=== Standings ===
Program for the November 10 game in Los Angeles to meet the rival Rams.

NFL Western Conference
	W	L	T	PCT	CONF	PF	PA	STK
Detroit Lions	8	4	0	.667	6–4	251	231	W3
San Francisco 49ers	8	4	0	.667	7–3	260	264	W3
Baltimore Colts	7	5	0	.583	6–4	303	235	L2
Los Angeles Rams	6	6	0	.500	5–5	307	278	W2
Chicago Bears	5	7	0	.417	4–6	203	211	L1
Green Bay Packers	3	9	0	.250	2–8	218	311	L3

Note: Tie games were not officially counted in the standings until 1972.

== Western Conference Playoff ==
Round	Date	Opponent	Result	Record	Venue	Attendance	Sources
Western Conference	December 22	Detroit Lions	L 27–31	0–1	Kezar Stadium	60,118	

== Personnel ==
=== Staff / Coaches ===
1957 San Francisco 49ers staff
Front office: Team Owner - Tony Morabito; General manager – Louis Spadia; Head coaches: Head coach - Frankie Albert; Offensive coaches: Chief of Offense / Offensive Coordinator - Red Hickey; Offensive Line – Bill Johnson	Defensive coaches: Defensive Assistant – Phil Bengtson; Special teams coaches: None - N/A

=== Roster ===
1957 San Francisco 49ers roster
Quarterbacks: 12 John Brodie; 14 Y. A. Tittle; Running backs: 22 Joe Arenas; 32 Gene Babb; 35 Larry Barnes P/LB; 39 Hugh McElhenny; 34 Joe Perry; Receivers: 88 Clyde Conner; 85 Bill Jessup P; 27 R. C. Owens; 82 Gordy Soltau K; 84 Billy Wilson	Offensive linemen: 77 Bruce Bosley G/T/DE; 64 Ted Connolly G; 78 Bobby Cross T; 70 Tom Dahms T; 76 John Gonzaga T/G/DT; 53 Frank Morze C; 68 Lou Palatella G; 79 Bob St. Clair T; Defensive linemen: 75 Ed Henke DE; 72 Bill Herchman DT; 73 Leo Nomellini DT; 74 Bob Toneff DE	Linebackers: 52 Karl Rubke MLB; 54 Marv Matuszak OLB/MLB; 55 Matt Hazeltine OLB; 87 Charley Powell OLB/DE; Defensive backs: 57 Paul Carr CB/LB; 47 Dicky Moegle S/RB; 42 Jimmy Ridlon CB/S; 24 J. D. Smith CB; 20 Bill Stits CB; 40 Julian Spence S; 44 Val Joe Walker S	Reserve lists: 40 Bob Holladay S (IR); rookies in italics
