= 1957 Chicago Bears season =

NFL team season

- Owner: George Halas
- General manager: George Halas
- Head coach: Paddy Driscoll
- Home stadium: Wrigley Field

Results
- Record: 5–7
- Division place: 5th NFL Western
- Playoffs: Did not qualify

The 1957 season was the Chicago Bears' 38th in the National Football League. The team failed to improve on their 9–2–1 record from 1956 and finished with a 5–7 record under second-year head coach Paddy Driscoll, one year after making the championship game. The 47–7 loss in that game, coupled with a 5–7 season, compelled owner George Halas to reassign Driscoll in February and return as head coach in 1958.

== Schedule ==
Game	Date	Opponent	Result	Record	Venue	Attendance	Recap	Sources
1	September 29	at **Green Bay Packers**	**L** 17–21	0–1	City Stadium	32,132	Recap	
2	October 5	at **Baltimore Colts**	**L** 10–21	0–2	Memorial Stadium	46,558	Recap	
3	October 13	**San Francisco 49ers**	**L** 17–21	0–3	Wrigley Field	45,310	Recap	
4	October 20	**Los Angeles Rams**	**W** 34–26	1–3	Wrigley Field	47,337	Recap	
5	October 27	at **San Francisco 49ers**	**L** 17–21	1–4	Kezar Stadium	56,693	Recap	
6	November 3	at **Los Angeles Rams**	**W** 16–10	2–4	L.A. Memorial Coliseum	80,456	Recap	
7	November 10	**Green Bay Packers**	**W** 21–14	3–4	Wrigley Field	47,153	Recap	
8	November 17	**Baltimore Colts**	**L** 14–29	3–5	Wrigley Field	47,168	Recap	
9	November 24	at **Detroit Lions**	**W** 27–7	4–5	Briggs Stadium	55,769	Recap	
10	December 1	Washington Redskins	**L** 3–14	4–6	Wrigley Field	39,148	Recap	
11	December 8	at Chicago Cardinals	**W** 14–6	5–6	Comiskey Park	43,735	Recap	
12	December 15	**Detroit Lions**	**L** 13–21	5–7	Wrigley Field	41,088	Recap	
Note: Intra-conference opponents are in **bold** text.

- October 5 was a Saturday night game.

== Standings ==
NFL Western Conference
	W	L	T	PCT	CONF	PF	PA	STK
Detroit Lions	8	4	0	.667	6–4	251	231	W3
San Francisco 49ers	8	4	0	.667	7–3	260	264	W3
Baltimore Colts	7	5	0	.583	6–4	303	235	L2
Los Angeles Rams	6	6	0	.500	5–5	307	278	W2
Chicago Bears	5	7	0	.417	4–6	203	211	L1
Green Bay Packers	3	9	0	.250	2–8	218	311	L3

Note: Tie games were not officially counted in the standings until 1972.

== Roster ==
Chicago Bears 1957 roster
Quarterbacks: 16 George Blanda QB/K; 12 Zeke Bratkowski QB/P; 15 Ed Brown QB/P; Running backs: 35 Rick Casares FB/P; 22 Ron Drzewiecki KR/PR; 28 Willie Galimore; 21 Perry Jeter; 45 Bobby Watkins; Receivers: 43 Jim Dooley; 83 Bill McColl; 88 Gene Schroeder	Offensive linemen: 65 Herman Clark G; 50 John Damore G/C; 62 Kline Gilbert T; 78 Stan Jones G; 67 Tom Roggeman G/LB; 55 Larry Strickland C; 72 Bill Wightkin T; Defensive linemen: 81 Doug Atkins DE; 73 Bill Bishop DT; 82 Jack Hoffman DE; 74 Bob Kilcullen DT; 71 Earl Leggett DT; 86 Ed Meadows DE; 75 Fred Williams DT; 63 M. L. Brackett DL/OL/LB	Linebackers: 31 Joe Fortunato OLB/FB; 61 Bill George MLB; 55 Wayne Hansen OLB/C; 40 Stan Wallace OLB/S; Defensive backs: 25 J. C. Caroline S; 49 Jack Johnson CB; 29 McNeil Moore S; 20 Ray Gene Smith CB; 48 Vic Zucco CB	Reserve: 18 Ronnie Knox QB/DB (Suspended); 87 Harlon Hill E (IR); 26 Charlie Sumner CB (Military); Rookies in italics

== Season summary ==
=== Week 1 at Packers ===
Week One: Chicago Bears (0–0) at Green Bay Packers (0–0)

Quarter	1	2	3	4	Total
Bears	7	7	3	0	17
Packers	0	14	0	7	21

at New City Stadium, Green Bay, Wisconsin

- Date: September 29
- Game attendance: 32,132
- Box Score

Game information

First quarter

- CHI – Ed Brown 5-yard run (George Blanda kick). Bears 7–0. Drive:

Second quarter

- GB – Billy Howton 37-yard pass from Babe Parilli (Fred Cone kick). Tie 7–7. Drive:
- CHI – Harlon Hill 11-yard pass from Ed Brown (George Blanda kick). Bears 14–7. Drive:
- GB – Fred Cone 1-yard run (Fred Cone kick). Tie 14–14. Drive:

Third quarter

- CHI – George Blanda 13-yard field goal. Bears 17–14. Drive:

Fourth quarter

- GB – Gary Knafelc 4-yard pass from Babe Parilli (Fred Cone kick). Packers 21–17. Drive:

Top passers

- CHI – Ed Brown – 12/24, 197 yards, TD, 4 INT
- GB – Babe Parilli – 9/17, 197 yards, 2 TD, INT

Top rushers

- CHI – Rick Casares – 18 rushes, 72 yards
- GB – Fred Cone – 20 rushes, 52 yards, TD

Top receivers

- CHI – Bill McColl – 4 receptions, 84 yards
- GB – Billy Howton — 8 receptions, 165 yards, TD
