= 1957 NFL season =

American football season

Regular season
- Duration: September 29 – December 22, 1957
- East Champions: Cleveland Browns
- West Champions: Detroit Lions (playoff)

Championship Game
- Champions: Detroit Lions

NFL teams: West, East

The 1957 NFL season was the 38th regular season of the National Football League. After a 5-to-7-game preseason slate, the league's 12 teams played a 12-game league schedule — 72 regular season contests in all.

The season ended on Sunday, December 29, with a "World's Championship Playoff" held in the home city of the Western Conference champions, won 59–14 by the Detroit Lions over the Cleveland Browns.

This was followed by the "All Star Pro-Bowl Game" held January 11, 1959, in Los Angeles, a game won by the East, 28–21.

== Draft ==
The 1957 NFL draft was held on November 26, 1956, and January 31, 1957, at Philadelphia's Warwick Hotel and The Bellevue-Stratford Hotel. With the first pick, the Green Bay Packers selected halfback Paul Hornung from the University of Notre Dame.

== Major rule changes ==
- During sudden-death overtime, rules for time outs are the same as in a regular game, including the last two minutes of the second and fourth quarters.
- Home teams wore dark jerseys and road team wore white. Previously, NFL teams were allowed to wear whatever uniform color they liked, even if it clashed with the other team, and were not required to have a white jersey.

== Division races ==
Cleveland won its opener, 6–3 over the Giants and led the Eastern Division from wire to wire. A 17–7 loss to the Eagles in Week Four forced the Browns to share the lead with New York, but the Giants lost the following week and spent the rest of the season trying to catch Cleveland.

The Western Division race was more protracted. Baltimore, Detroit, and San Francisco were tied for the lead several times and had identical 7–4 records at the end of the penultimate week. When two teams tied for first place, they would meet in a one-game playoff. The NFL did have a provision for this situation: "If all three teams win, tie, or lose, then a two-week playoff series begins next Sunday with Baltimore drawing a bye, San Francisco playing Detroit, and the winner meeting the Colts at Baltimore December 29." Detroit and San Francisco both won while starting their backup quarterbacks (Tobin Rote and rookie John Brodie, respectively), but the Colts lost, meaning the additional playoff was not required.

Week	Western	Record	Eastern	Record
1	3 teams (Bal, GB, LA)	1–0–0	3 teams (Cards, Cle, Pit)	1–0–0
2	Baltimore Colts	2–0–0	Cleveland Browns	2–0–0
3	Baltimore Colts	3–0–0	Cleveland Browns	3–0–0
4	3 teams (Bal, Det, SF)	3–1–0	Tie (Cle, NYG)	3–1–0
5	San Francisco 49ers	4–1–0	Cleveland Browns	4–1–0
6	San Francisco 49ers	5–1–0	Cleveland Browns	5–1–0
7	San Francisco 49ers	5–2–0	Cleveland Browns	6–1–0
8	3 teams (Bal, Det, SF)	5–3–0	Cleveland Browns	6–1–1
9	Baltimore Colts	6–3–0	Cleveland Browns	7–1–1
10	Baltimore Colts	7–3–0	Cleveland Browns	8–1–1
11	3 teams (Bal, Det, SF)	7–4–0	Cleveland Browns	8–2–1
12	(tie) Detroit Lions	8–4–0	Cleveland Browns	9–2–1
12	San Francisco 49ers	8–4–0		

== Final standings ==
NFL Eastern Conference
	W	L	T	PCT	CONF	PF	PA	STK
Cleveland Browns	9	2	1	.818	8–1–1	269	172	W1
New York Giants	7	5	0	.583	6–4	254	211	L3
Pittsburgh Steelers	6	6	0	.500	5–5	161	178	W1
Washington Redskins	5	6	1	.455	4–5–1	251	230	W3
Philadelphia Eagles	4	8	0	.333	4–6	173	230	L2
Chicago Cardinals	3	9	0	.250	2–8	200	299	L1

Note: Tie games were not officially counted in the standings until 1972.

NFL Western Conference
	W	L	T	PCT	CONF	PF	PA	STK
Detroit Lions	8	4	0	.667	6–4	251	231	W3
San Francisco 49ers	8	4	0	.667	7–3	260	264	W3
Baltimore Colts	7	5	0	.583	6–4	303	235	L2
Los Angeles Rams	6	6	0	.500	5–5	307	278	W2
Chicago Bears	5	7	0	.417	4–6	203	211	L1
Green Bay Packers	3	9	0	.250	2–8	218	311	L3

== Playoffs ==
Home team in capitals

Western Conference Playoff Game

- Detroit 31, SAN FRANCISCO 27

NFL Championship Game

- DETROIT 59, Cleveland 14

== Awards ==
AP NFL Most Valuable Player	Jim Brown, Fullback, Cleveland
AP NFL Coach of the Year	George Wilson, Lions

== Coaching changes ==
- Detroit Lions: Buddy Parker was replaced by George Wilson.
- Pittsburgh Steelers: Walt Kiesling was replaced by Buddy Parker.

== Stadium changes ==
The Green Bay Packers moved from City Stadium to New City Stadium, renamed Lambeau Field in 1965
