= 1955 Big Ten Conference football season =

- Sport: American football
- Teams: 10
- Top draft pick: Earl Morrall
- Champion: Ohio State
- Runners-up: Michigan State
- Season MVP: Howard Cassady

Football seasons
- ← 1954 1956 →

1955 Big Ten Conference football standings
| | Conf. | | | | | Overall |
| Team | W | | L | | T | W | | L | | T |
|---|---|---|---|---|---|---|---|---|---|---|
| No. 5 Ohio State $ | 6 | – | 0 | – | 0 | 7 | – | 2 | – | 0 |
| No. 2 Michigan State | 5 | – | 1 | – | 0 | 9 | – | 1 | – | 0 |
| No. 12 Michigan | 5 | – | 2 | – | 0 | 7 | – | 2 | – | 0 |
| Purdue | 4 | – | 2 | – | 1 | 5 | – | 3 | – | 1 |
| Illinois | 3 | – | 3 | – | 1 | 5 | – | 3 | – | 1 |
| Wisconsin | 3 | – | 4 | – | 0 | 4 | – | 5 | – | 0 |
| Iowa | 2 | – | 3 | – | 1 | 3 | – | 5 | – | 1 |
| Minnesota | 2 | – | 5 | – | 0 | 3 | – | 6 | – | 0 |
| Indiana | 1 | – | 5 | – | 0 | 3 | – | 6 | – | 0 |
| Northwestern | 0 | – | 6 | – | 1 | 0 | – | 8 | – | 1 |
$ – Conference champion; Rankings from AP Poll

The 1955 Big Ten Conference football season was the 60th season of college football played by the member schools of the Big Ten Conference (also known as the Western Conference) and was a part of the 1955 college football season.

The 1955 Ohio State Buckeyes football team, under head coach Woody Hayes, won the Big Ten football championship with a record of 7–2 and was ranked No. 5 in the final AP Poll. Halfback Howard Cassady was a consensus first-team All-American and won both the 1955 Heisman Trophy as the best player in college football and the Chicago Tribune Silver Football as the most valuable player in the Big Ten.

The 1955 Michigan State Spartans football team, under head coach Duffy Daugherty, compiled a 9–1 record, defeated UCLA in the 1956 Rose Bowl, and was ranked No. 2 behind Oklahoma in the final AP Poll. Quarterback Earl Morrall was a consensus first-team All-American and was the first Big Ten player selected in the 1956 NFL draft with the second overall pick. Tackle Norm Masters was also a first-team All-American.

The 1955 Michigan Wolverines football team, under head coach Bennie Oosterbaan, compiled a 7–2 record and was ranked No. 12 in the final AP Poll. In the second week of the season, the Wolverines defeated Michigan State, the Spartans' only loss of the season. The Wolverines rose to No. 1 in the AP Poll after defeating Army (ranked No. 6), but after starting the season 6-0, Michigan lost to Illinois on November 5, 1955. End Ron Kramer was a consensus first-team All-American.

Iowa guard Cal Jones won the Outland Trophy as the best interior lineman in college football. He was the first Big Ten player to receive the award.

== Season overview ==
=== Results and team statistics ===
| Conf. Rank | Team | Head coach | AP final | AP high | Overall record | Conf. record | PPG | PAG | MVP |
|---|---|---|---|---|---|---|---|---|---|
| 1 | Ohio State | Woody Hayes | #5 | #4 | 7–2 | 6–0 | 22.3 | 10.8 | **Howard Cassady** |
| 2 | Michigan State | Duffy Daugherty | #2 | #2 | 9–1 | 5–1 | **25.3** | **8.3** | Carl Nystrom |
| 3 | Michigan | Bennie Oosterbaan | #12 | #1 | 7–2 | 5–2 | 19.9 | 10.4 | Terry Barr |
| 4 | Purdue | Stu Holcomb | NR | #17 | 5–3–1 | 4–2–1 | 12.6 | 11.4 | Joe Krupa |
| 5 | Illinois | Ray Eliot | NR | #16 | 5–3–1 | 3–3–1 | 16.6 | 12.7 | Em Lindbeck |
| 6 | Wisconsin | Ivy Williamson | NR | #6 | 4–5 | 3–4 | 19.1 | 18.4 | Wells Gray |
| 7 | Iowa | Forest Evashevski | NR | #12 | 3–5–1 | 2–3–1 | 18.4 | 19.2 | Jerry Reichow |
| 8 | Minnesota | Murray Warmath | NR | NR | 3–6 | 2–5 | 12.2 | 19.1 | Don Swanson |
| 9 | Indiana | Bernie Crimmins | NR | NR | 3–6 | 1–5 | 10.1 | 16.7 | Bob Skoronski |
| 10 | Northwestern | Lou Saban | NR | NR | 0-8-1 | 0-6-1 | 7.3 | 26.8 | Kurt Krueger |

Key
AP final = Team's rank in the final AP Poll of the 1955 season
AP high = Team's highest rank in the AP Poll throughout the 1955 season
PPG = Average of points scored per game; conference leader's average displayed in bold
PAG = Average of points allowed per game; conference leader's average displayed in bold
MVP = Most valuable player as voted by players on each team as part of the voting process to determine the winner of the Chicago Tribune Silver Football trophy; trophy winner in bold

=== Preseason ===
On February 3, 1955, Bob Voigts resigned as Northwestern's head football coach. Voights had come under fire from alumni after Northwestern won only one conference game in two seasons. Less than a week later, Lou Saban was announced as Voigts' replacement. Saban had been an assistant coach at Northwestern in 1954. He had played for Indiana in 1941 and 1942 and for the Cleveland Browns from 1946 to 1949.

=== Regular season ===
==== September 24 ====
On September 24, 1955, the Big Ten football teams opened their seasons with one conference game and eight non-conference games. The non-conference games resulted in six wins and two losses.

- Michigan 42, Missouri 7. Michigan (ranked No. 4 in the AP Poll) defeated Missouri, 42–7, before a crowd of 51,801 at Michigan Stadium in Ann Arbor, Michigan.
- Ohio State 28, Nebraska 20. Ohio State (ranked No. 6 in the AP Poll) defeated Nebraska, 28–20, before a crowd of 80,171 at Ohio Stadium in Columbus, Ohio.
- Michigan State 20, Indiana 13. Michigan State defeated Indiana, 20–13, before a crowd of 23,000 at Memorial Stadium in Bloomington, Indiana.
- Purdue 14, Pacific 7.
- Illinois 20, California 13.
- Wisconsin 28, Marquette 14.
- Iowa 28, Kansas State 7.
- Washington 30, Minnesota 0.
- Miami (OH) 25, Northwestern 14.

==== October 1 ====
On October 1, 1955, the Big Ten football teams participate in three conference games and four non-conference games. The non-conference games resulted in one win and three losses, bringing the Big Ten's record against non-conference opponents to 7–5.

- Michigan 14, Michigan State 7. Michigan (ranked No. 2 in the AP Poll) defeated Michigan State, 14–7, before a crowd of 97,239 at Michigan Stadium in Ann Arbor, Michigan.
- Stanford 6, Ohio State 0. Ohio State (ranked No. 8 in the AP Poll) lost to Stanford, 6–0, before a crowd of 28,000 at Stanford Stadium in Stanford, California.
- Wisconsin 37, Iowa 14. Wisconsin (ranked No. 17 in the AP Poll) defeated Iowa (ranked No. 14), 37–14, before a crowd of 53,509 at Camp Randall Stadium in Madison, Wisconsin.
- Notre Dame 19, Indiana 0.
- Illinois 40, Iowa State 0.
- Purdue 7, Minnesota 6.
- Tulane 21, Northwestern 0

==== October 8 ====
On October 8, 1955, the Big Ten football teams participated in four conference games and two non-conference games. The two non-conference games resulted in wins, bringing the Big Ten's record against non-conference opponents to 9-5 up to that point in the season.

- Michigan State 38, Stanford 14.
- Ohio State 27, Illinois 12.
- Michigan 26, Army 2.
- Wisconsin 9, Purdue 0.
- Iowa 20, Indiana 6.
- Minnesota 18, Northwestern 7.

==== October 15 ====
On October 14 and 15, 1955, the Big Ten football teams played three conference games and four non-conference games. The four non-conference games resulted in two wins and two losses, bringing the Big Ten's record against non-conference opponents to 11-7 up to that point in the season.

- Michigan State 21, Notre Dame 7.
- Duke 20, Ohio State 14.
- Michigan 14, Northwestern 2.
- Iowa 20, Purdue 20.
- USC 33, Wisconsin 21. (Game played October 14)
- Illinois 21, Northwestern 13.
- Indiana 14, Villanova 7.

==== October 22 ====
On October 21 and 22, 1955, the Big Ten football teams participated in four conference games and two non-conference games. Iowa's non-conference game was played on Friday, October 21, while the remaining games were played on Saturday, October 22. The two non-conference games resulted in two losses, bringing the Big Ten's record against non-conference opponents to 11-9 up to that point in the season.

- UCLA 33, Iowa 13.
- Michigan State 21, Illinois 7.
- Ohio State 26, Wisconsin 16.
- Michigan 14, Minnesota 13.
- Notre Dame 22, Purdue 7.
- Indiana 20, Northwestern 14.

==== October 29 ====
On October 29, 1955, the Big Ten football teams played four conference games and two non-conference games. The two non-conference games resulted in two wins, bringing the Big Ten's record against non-conference opponents to 13-9 up to that point in the season.

- Michigan 33, Iowa 21. Michigan (ranked No. 3 in the AP Poll and No. 1 in the UP Poll) defeated Iowa, 33–21, before a crowd of 73,275 at Michigan Stadium in Ann Arbor, Michigan.
- Michigan State 27, Wisconsin 0. Michigan State (ranked No. 5 in the AP Poll) defeated Wisconsin, 27–0, before a crowd of 53,529 at Camp Randall Stadium in Madison, Wisconsin.
- Ohio State 49, Northwestern 0. Ohio State (ranked No. 15 in the AP Poll) defeated Northwestern, 49–0, 82,214 at Ohio Stadium in Columbus, Ohio.
- Purdue 13, Illinois 0. Purdue defeated Illinois, 13–0, at Memorial Stadium in Champaign, Illinois.
- Minnesota 25, USC 19. Minnesota defeated USC (ranked No. 10 in the AP Poll), 25-19, before a crowd of 64,047 at Memorial Stadium in Minneapolis.
- Indiana 21, Ohio 14. Indiana defeated Ohio, 21–14, at Memorial Stadium in Bloomington, Indiana.

==== November 5 ====
On November 5, 1955, the Big Ten football teams played each other in five conference games.

- Illinois 25, Michigan 6. Illinois defeated Michigan (ranked No. 3 in the AP Poll and No. 1 in the UP Poll), 25–6, before a crowd of 56,056 at Memorial Stadium in Champaign, Illinois.
- Michigan State 27, Purdue 0. Michigan State (ranked No. 4 in the AP Poll) defeated Purdue, 27–0, before a crowd of 41,000 at Ross–Ade Stadium in West Lafayette, Indiana.
- Ohio State 20, Indiana 13. Ohio State (ranked No. 11 in the AP Poll) defeated Indiana, 20–13, before a crowd of 80,730 at Ohio Stadium in Columbus, Ohio.
- Wisconsin 41, Northwestern 14. Wisconsin defeated Northwestern, 41–14, before a crowd of 40,000 at Dyche Stadium in Evanston, Illinois.
- Iowa 26, Minnesota 0. In the annual battle for the Floyd of Rosedale trophy, Iowa defeated Minnesota, 26–0, at Iowa Stadium in Iowa City.

==== November 12 ====
On November 12, 1955, the Big Ten football teams played each other in five conference games.

- Michigan State 42, Minnesota 14. Michigan State (ranked No. 3 in the AP Poll) defeated Minnesota, 42–14, before a crowd of 51,605 at Macklin Stadium in East Lansing, Michigan.
- Ohio State 20, Iowa 10. Ohio State (ranked No. 10 in the AP Poll) defeated Iowa (ranked No. 20), 20–10, before a crowd of 82,701 at Ohio Stadium in Columbus, Ohio.
- Michigan 30, Indiana 0. Michigan (ranked No. 7 in the AP Poll) defeated Indiana, 30–0, before a crowd of 61,019 at Michigan Stadium in Ann Arbor, Michigan.
- Purdue 46, Northwestern 8. Purdue defeated Northwestern, 46-8, before a crowd of 27,000 at Ross-Ade Stadium in West Lafayette, Indiana.
- Illinois 17, Wisconsin 14. Illinois defeated Wisconsin, 17–14, before a crowd of 53,529 at Camp Randall Stadium in Madison, Wisconsin.

==== November 19 ====
On November 19, 1955, the Big Ten Conference football teams played four conference games and two non-conference games. The two non-conference games resulted in a win and a loss, bringing the Big Ten's record against non-conference opponents to 14-10 up to that point in the season.

- Michigan State 33, Marquette 0. Michigan State (ranked No. 3 in the AP Poll) defeated Marquette, 33–0, before a crowd of 41,814 at Macklin Stadium in East Lansing, Michigan.
- Ohio State 17, Michigan 0. In the annual Michigan–Ohio State rivalry game, Ohio State (ranked No. 9 in the AP Poll) defeated Michigan (ranked No. 6), 17–0, before a crowd of 97,369 at Michigan Stadium in Ann Arbor, Michigan.
- Purdue 6, Indiana 4. In the annual battle for the Old Oaken Bucket, Purdue defeated Indiana, 6–4, in Bloomington, Indiana.
- Minnesota 21, Wisconsin 6. In the annual battle for Paul Bunyan's Axe, Minnesota defeated Wisconsin, 21–6, before a crowd of 62,714 at Memorial Stadium in Minneapolis.
- Illinois 7, Northwestern 7. In the annual battle for the Sweet Sioux Tomahawk, Illinois and Northwestern played to a 7–7 tie before a crowd of 35,000 at Dyche Stadium in Evanston, Illinois.
- Notre Dame 17, Iowa 14. Iowa lost to Notre Dame (ranked No. 4 in the AP Poll), 17–14, before a crowd of 59,955 at Notre Dame Stadium in South Bend, Indiana.

=== Bowl games ===
On January 2, 1956, Michigan State defeated UCLA, 17-14, in the 1956 Rose Bowl.

=== Post-season developments ===
On November 29, 1955, the Associated Press released its final college football rankings. Oklahoma was ranked at No. 1 by the AP with three Big Ten teams ranked in the top 20: Michigan State (No. 2); Ohio State (No. 5); and Michigan (No. 12).

After the 1955 season, three Big Ten teams changed head football coaches as follows:

- On December 9, 1955, Purdue head coach Stu Holcomb resigned his position and signed a five-year contract as the athletic director at Northwestern. Four days later, Purdue president Frederick L. Hovde announced that Holcomb's top assistant, Jack Mollenkopf, had been signed to a three-year contract as Purdue's head football coach.
- On December 12, 1955, Stu Holcomb, in his new position as Northwestern's athletic director, fired head coach Lou Saban and his entire staff of assistant coaches. Four days later, Holcomb announced that he had signed Miami (OH) head coach Ara Parseghian to a three-year contract as the Wildcats' new head coach. Parseghian had led the 1955 Miami Redskins football team to a perfect 9–0 record.
- Also in December 1955, Wisconsin head coach Ivy Williamson was promoted to athletic director. He appointed Milt Bruhn as the school's new head football coach. Bruhn had been a lineman on Minnesota's undefeated 1934 and 1935 national championship teams and had been Wisconsin's line coach since 1949.

== Awards and honors ==
=== All-Big Ten honors ===
The following players were picked by the Associated Press (AP) and/or the United Press (UP) as first-team players on the 1955 All-Big Ten Conference football team.

| Position | Name | Team | Selectors |
|---|---|---|---|
| End | Ron Kramer | Michigan | AP, UP |
| End | Tom Maentz | Michigan | AP, UP |
| Tackle | Cal Jones | Iowa | AP, UP [guard] |
| Tackle | Norm Masters | Michigan State | AP |
| Tackle | Francis Machinsky | Ohio State | UP |
| Tackle | Joe Kruper | Purdue | UP |
| Guard | Jim Parker | Ohio State | AP, UP |
| Guard | Carl Nystrom | Michigan State | AP |
| Center | Ken Vargo | Ohio State | AP, UP |
| Halfback | Howard Cassady | Ohio State | AP, UP |
| Quarterback | Earl Morrall | Michigan State | AP, UP |
| Back | Bill Murakowski | Purdue | AP |
| Back | Bob Mitchell | Illinois | AP |
| Halfback | Tony Branoff | Michigan | UP |
| Fullback | Jerry Planutis | Michigan State | UP |

=== All-American honors ===
At the end of the 1955 season, Big Ten players secured five of 12 consensus first-team picks for the 1955 College Football All-America Team. The Big Ten's consensus All-Americans were:

| Position | Name | Team | Selectors |
|---|---|---|---|
| Halfback | Howard Cassady | Ohio State | AAB, AFCA, AP, FWAA, INS, NEA, TSN, UP, CP, Jet, WCFF |
| End | Ron Kramer | Michigan | AAB, AFCA, FWAA, INS, NEA, TSN, UP, Jet, WCFF |
| Quarterback | Earl Morrall | Michigan State | AP, AFCA, FWAA, INS, TSN, Jet, WCFF |
| Guard | Cal Jones | Iowa | AAB, FWAA, TSN, UP, Jet, WCFF |
| Tackle | Norm Masters | Michigan State | UP, FWAA, NEA, CP, WCFF |

Other Big Ten players who were named first-team All-Americans by at least one selector were:

| Position | Name | Team | Selectors |
|---|---|---|---|
| Guard | Jim Parker | Ohio State | FWAA, CP, Jet |
| Fullback | Jerry Planutis | Michigan State | Jet |

=== Other awards ===
Ohio State halfback Howard Cassady won the 1955 Heisman Trophy. Three other Big Ten players finished among the top 10 in voting for the Heisman Trophy: Michigan State quarterback Earl Morrall (fourth), Michigan end Ron Kramer (eighth), and Iowa offensive lineman Cal Jones (10th).

Cassady also received the Maxwell Award and the UPI and Sporting News College Football Player of the Year awards.

Iowa guard Cal Jones won the Outland Trophy as the best interior lineman in college football. He was the first Big Ten player to receive the award.

== 1956 NFL draft ==
The following Big Ten players were among the first 100 picks in the 1956 NFL draft:

| Name | Position | Team | Round | Overall pick |
|---|---|---|---|---|
| Quarterback | Earl Morrall | Michigan State | 1 | 2 |
| Halfback | Howard Cassady | Ohio State | 1 | 3 |
| Tackle | Joe Krupa | Purdue | 2 | 17 |
| Tackle | Norm Masters | Michigan State | 2 | 18 |
| End | Bill Quinlan | Michigan State | 3 | 37 |
| Quarterback | Jerry Reichow | Iowa | 4 | 38 |
| Guard | Dick Murley | Purdue | 4 | 39 |
| Tackle | Fran Machinsky | Ohio State | 4 | 41 |
| End | Jim Freeman | Iowa | 5 | 51 |
| Back | Bill Murakowski | Purdue | 5 | 52 |
| Tackle | Bob Skoronski | Indiana | 5 | 56 |
| Back | Gary Lowe | Michigan State | 5 | 59 |
| Tackle | John Dittrich | Wisconsin | 6 | 70 |
| Back | Eddie Vincent | Iowa | 6 | 72 |
| Tackle | Bob Konovsky | Wisconsin | 7 | 77 |
| Back | J. C. Caroline | Illinois | 7 | 82 |
| Guard | Cal Jones | Iowa | 8 | 98 |
