= 1956 Rose Bowl =

American college football game

- 42nd Rose Bowl Game
Michigan State Spartans	UCLA Bruins
(8–1)	(9–1)
Big Ten	Pacific Coast
17	14
Head coach: Duffy Daugherty	Head coach: Red Sanders
AP / Coaches; 2 / 2	AP / Coaches; 4 / 4
	1	2	3	4	Total
Michigan State	0	7	0	10	17
UCLA	7	0	0	7	14
- Date: January 2, 1956
- Season: 1955
- Stadium: Rose Bowl
- Location: Pasadena, California
- MVP: Walt Kowalczyk (Michigan State HB)
- Favorite: Michigan State by 7 points
- National anthem: UCLA Band and Michigan State Marching Band combined
- Referee: Ross Dean (Big Ten; split crew: Big Ten, AAWU)
- Halftime show: UCLA Band, Michigan State Marching Band
- Attendance: 100,809

United States TV coverage
- Network: NBC
- Announcers: Mel Allen, Sam Balter

The 1956 Rose Bowl was the 42nd edition of the college football bowl game, played at the Rose Bowl in Pasadena, California, on Monday, January 2. The Michigan State Spartans of the Big Ten Conference defeated the UCLA Bruins of the Pacific Coast Conference, 17–14. Michigan State halfback Walt Kowalczyk was named the Player of the Game.

The game featured two of the most racially integrated college football teams of the day, with six African American players for the Bruins and seven for the Spartans. This stood in stark contrast to the Sugar Bowl, where there was controversy over whether Bobby Grier from Pitt should be allowed to play and whether Georgia Tech should even play at all, due to Georgia governor Marvin Griffin's opposition to integration. Only one month previous, Rosa Parks made her famous protest in the Montgomery bus boycott. The 1956 Rose Bowl has the highest TV rating of all college bowl games, watched by 41.1% of all people in the US with TV sets.

As New Year's Day fell on a Sunday in 1956, the bowl games were played the following day.

== Teams ==
=== Michigan State College Spartans ===
The Ohio State Buckeyes were the undefeated Big Ten conference champions. However, Ohio State would not be invited to the Rose Bowl because of the no-repeat rule in the Big Ten conference. This left Michigan State to be accepted. Ohio State was ranked fourth with a 7–2 record, and Michigan State was second with a 9–1 record. The teams did not play each other during the regular season. Michigan State opened with a 20–13 win at Indiana, but fell to in-state rival Michigan 14–7, their only setback of the season. They won 38–14 over then-#20 Stanford, and defeated then-#4 Notre Dame 21–7. The Spartans did not play Northwestern, Iowa, or Ohio State. The Buckeyes' two losses were out of conference, to Duke (20–14) and Stanford (6–0).

=== UCLA Bruins ===
UCLA was the defending national champion after an undefeated season in 1954. The Bruins began the 1955 season ranked number one. In a showdown at #5 Maryland, the Bruins lost 0–7 to the Terrapins. A 38–0 win over Oregon State ultimately proved to be the game for the conference championship. The Bruins won the rest of their regular season games, including a 21–13 win over Stanford. With the Pacific Coast conference championship already won, the Bruins won their third straight rivalry game over USC 17–7.

== Pre-game activities ==
In a Sports Illustrated article preceding the 1956 Rose Bowl, UCLA head coach Red Sanders was quoted as saying "Sure, winning isn't every thing, It's the only thing." Coaches Duffy Daugherty and Red Sanders appeared on The Jack Benny Program "New Years Day" 1956 episode on Sunday, January 1, 1956, preceding the game to be played the next day.

== Game summary ==
This was the second meeting between the two schools, the first was a 28–20 victory for the Spartans two years earlier in the 1954 Rose Bowl. The Spartans wore their green home jerseys and the Bruins wore their white road jerseys.

On the first play from scrimmage, Jim Decker of UCLA intercepted a pass from Michigan State quarterback Earl Morrall, and returned four yards to the MSU 16-yard line. Four plays later, Bob Davenport scored on a two-yard run over left guard to give the Bruins a 7–0 lead.

Midway through the second quarter, Michigan State put together an 11-play, 80-yard drive to pull even at seven; Walt Kowalczyk's 30-yard run to the UCLA 17 set up Morrall's 13-yard touchdown toss to Clarence Peaks. There was no additional scoring through the third quarter.

On the second play of the fourth quarter, the Spartans took their first lead at 14–7 on Peaks’ 67-yard touchdown pass to John Lewis, who caught the ball on the 50 and took it the distance. Five minutes later, The UCLA Bruin passing game produced a big play as UCLA quarterback Ronnie Knox connected with Jim Decker with a 47-yard pass play to the Spartan 7-yard line. Three plays later, Doug Peters scored on a one-yard plunge at center. Morrall directed an 11-play, 59-yard drive to the UCLA 24, but Gerald Planutis missed a 41-yard field-goal attempt.

Five penalties were called in the closing minutes and field position shifted in Michigan State's favor when UCLA was whistled for three-straight penalties. UCLA was called for an intentional grounding infraction which pushed the ball back to its own one-yard line; a punt gave the Spartans the ball at the UCLA 40-yard line. The Bruins were cited for interference with the kick returner on the punt play, which put the ball at the Bruin 19-yard line. Replacing Planutis as placekicker, Dave Kaiser of Michigan State converted his first career field-goal attempt, a 41-yard kick, with seven seconds remaining in the game to give the Spartans a 17–14 win.

=== Scoring ===
==== First quarter ====
- UCLA – Bob Davenport 2 run (Jim Decker kick), 11:48 left. Drive: 4 plays, 16 yards.

==== Second quarter ====
- MSU – Clarence Peaks 13 pass from Earl Morrall (Gerald Planutis kick), 5:52 left. Drive: 11 plays, 80 yards.

==== Third quarter ====
No scoring

==== Fourth quarter ====
- MSU – John Lewis 67 pass from Peaks (Planutis kick), 14:11 left. Drive: 3 plays, 80 yards.
- UCLA – Doug Peters 1 run (Decker kick), 6:07 left. Drive: 5 plays, 56 yards.
- MSU – FG Dave Kaiser 41, 0:07 left. Drive: 3 plays, −5 yards

=== Statistics ===
Team stats	Mich. St.	UCLA
First downs	18	13
Net Yards Rushing	251	136
Net Yards Passing	130	61
Total Yards	381	197
PC–PA–Int.	6–18–2	2–10–1
Punts–Avg.	2–40.0	7–39.6
Fumbles–Lost	4–1	2–0
Penalties–Yards	10–98	8–60

== Aftermath ==
Although it was UCLA penalties in the final minutes that gave field position to Michigan State, the Spartans' 98 yards given up on 10 penalties are a Rose Bowl game record as of 2008. The Spartans were named National Champions by the Boand System. Oklahoma would be named National champion by all the other organizations. In the 1956 Orange Bowl, the #1 Oklahoma Sooners defeated the #3 Maryland Terrapins 20–6 in a battle of undefeated teams. The Sugar Bowl was the last bowl game to be integrated. The Cotton Bowl, Orange Bowl, and Sugar Bowl were not integrated until 1948, 1955, and 1956 respectively.

== Bibliography ==
- UCLA Football Media Guide (PDF copy available at www.uclabruins.com)
- Michigan State University Media Guide (PDF copy available at msuspartans.cstv.com Archived 2009-04-16 at the Wayback Machine)
