= 1955 Illinois Fighting Illini football team =

American college football season

1955 Illinois Fighting Illini football
- Conference: Big Ten Conference
- Record: 5–3–1 (3–3–1 Big Ten)
- Head coach: Ray Eliot (14th season)
- MVP: Em Lindbeck
- Captain: Game captains
- Home stadium: Memorial Stadium

1955 Big Ten Conference football standings
	Conf.					Overall
Team	W		L		T	W		L		T
No. 5 Ohio State $	6	–	0	–	0	7	–	2	–	0
No. 2 Michigan State	5	–	1	–	0	9	–	1	–	0
No. 12 Michigan	5	–	2	–	0	7	–	2	–	0
Purdue	4	–	2	–	1	5	–	3	–	1
Illinois	3	–	3	–	1	5	–	3	–	1
Wisconsin	3	–	4	–	0	4	–	5	–	0
Iowa	2	–	3	–	1	3	–	5	–	1
Minnesota	2	–	5	–	0	3	–	6	–	0
Indiana	1	–	5	–	0	3	–	6	–	0
Northwestern	0	–	6	–	1	0	–	8	–	1
$ – Conference champion; Rankings from AP Poll

The 1955 Illinois Fighting Illini football team was an American football team that represented the University of Illinois as a member of the Big Ten Conference during the 1955 Big Ten season. In their 14th year under head coach Ray Eliot, the Fighting Illini compiled a 5–3–1 record (3–3–1 in conference games), finished in fifth place in the Big Ten, and outscored opponents by a total of 149 to 114.

Quarterback Em Lindbeck was selected as the team's most valuable player. Two Illinois players received honors on the 1955 All-Big Ten Conference football team: halfback Bobby Mitchell (AP-1) and halfback Harry Jefferson (AP-2, UP-3, INS-1).

The team played its home games at Memorial Stadium in Champaign, Illinois.

== Schedule ==
Date	Opponent	Rank	Site	Result	Attendance	Source
September 24	at California*		California Memorial Stadium; Berkeley, CA	W 20–13	32,000	
October 1	Iowa State*		Memorial Stadium; Champaign, IL	W 40–0	45,706	
October 8	at Ohio State		Ohio Stadium; Columbus, OH (Illibuck)	L 12–27	82,407	
October 15	Minnesota		Memorial Stadium; Champaign, IL	W 21–13	45,995	
October 22	at No. 6 Michigan State		Macklin Stadium; East Lansing, MI	L 7–21	51,851	
October 29	Purdue		Memorial Stadium; Champaign, IL (rivalry)	L 0–13	61,262	
November 5	No. 3 Michigan		Memorial Stadium; Champaign, IL (rivalry)	W 25–6	58,968	
November 12	at Wisconsin	No. 16	Camp Randall Stadium; Madison, WI	W 17–14	53,529	
November 19	at Northwestern		Dyche Stadium; Evanston, IL (rivalry)	T 7–7	35,000	
*Non-conference game; Rankings from AP Poll released prior to the game

== Roster ==
Team photo of the 1955 Illinois Fighting Illini football team.
