= Athletics (physical culture) =

Sports that require a significant physical component

Athletics is a term encompassing the human competitive sports and games requiring physical skill, and the systems of training that prepare athletes for competitive performance. Athletic sports or contests are competitions which are primarily based on human physical competition, demanding the qualities of stamina, fitness, and skill. Athletic sports form the bulk of popular sporting activities, with other major forms including motorsports, precision sports, extreme sports and animal sports.

Athletic contests, as one of the earliest types of sport, are prehistoric and comprised a significant part of the Ancient Olympic Games, along with equestrian events. The word "athletic" is derived from the Ancient Greek: άθλος (athlos) meaning "contest." Athletic sports became organized in the late 19th century with the formation of organizations such as the Amateur Athletic Union in the United States and the Union des Sociétés Françaises de Sports Athlétiques in France. The Intercollegiate Athletic Association of the United States (later the National Collegiate Athletic Association) was established in 1906 to oversee athletic sports at college-level in the United States, known as college athletics.

Athletics has gained significant importance at educational institutions; talented athletes may gain entry into higher education through athletic scholarships and represent their institutions in athletic conferences. Since the Industrial Revolution, people in the developed world have adopted an increasingly sedentary lifestyle. As a result, athletics now plays a significant part in providing routine physical exercise. Athletic clubs worldwide offer athletic training facilities for multitudes of sports and games.

== Etymology ==
The word athletics is derived from the Greek word "athlos" (ἄθλος), meaning "contest" or "task". The Ancient Olympic Games were born of war and featured various forms of athletics such as running, jumping, boxing and wrestling competitions.

In the modern English language the term athletics has taken on two distinct meanings. Its meaning in American English broadly denotes human physical sports and their respective systems of training, the sense described in this article. The other, narrower principal meaning of the word comes from British English and variants within the British Commonwealth; this meaning of athletics refers solely to the concept of the sport of athletics (a category of sporting competition that comprises track and field sports and various other forms of foot racing), rather than physical sport in general.

== Biological factors ==
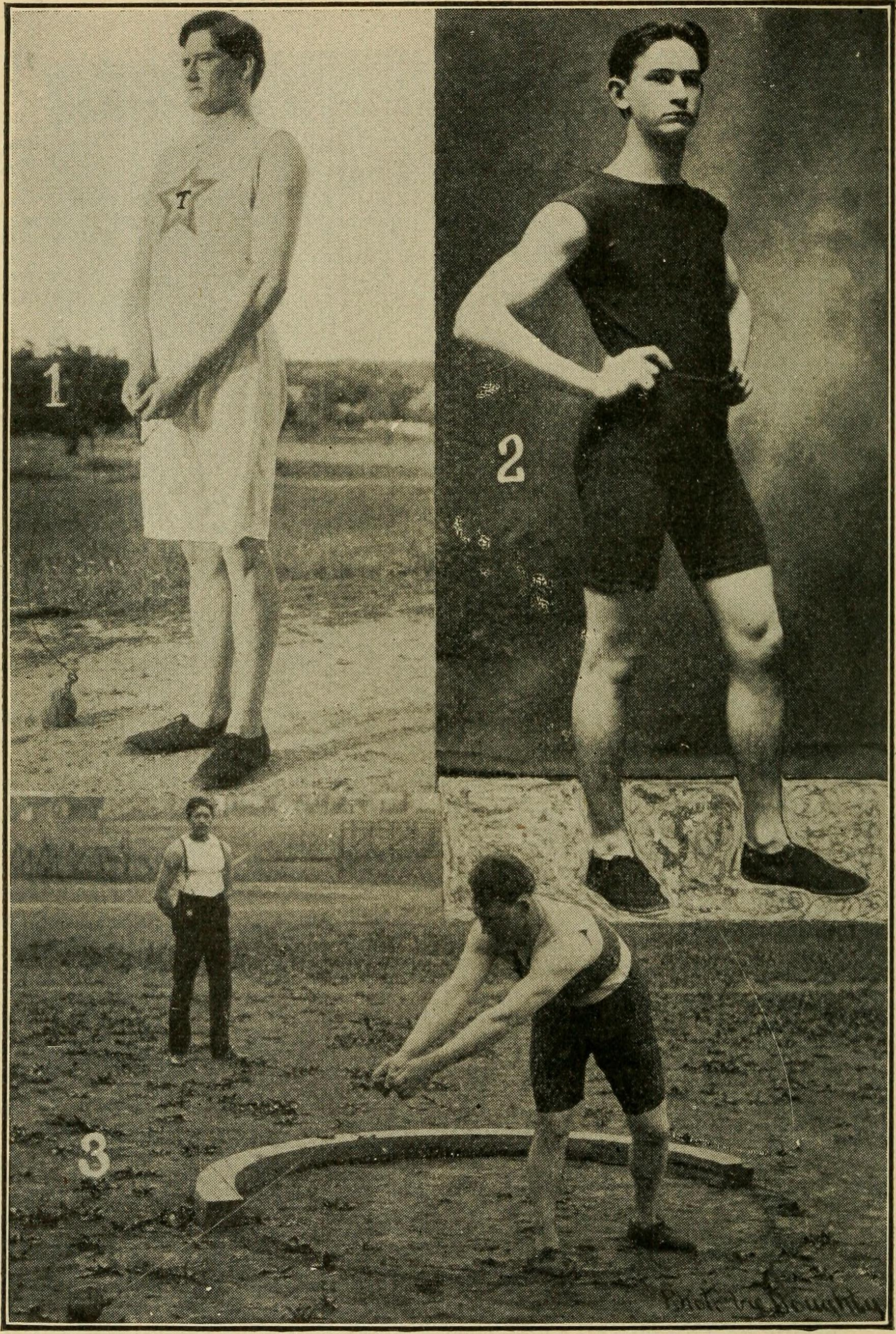
A few athletes

Gender and genetics play major roles in athletic body types. Significantly fewer football leagues exist for women; however, women have been active in martial arts for centuries, and sports like figure skating and tennis tend to favor women in terms of spectator popularity. Basketball, high jump, and volleyball favor taller athletes, while gymnastics and wrestling favor shorter ones. Long distance runners tend to be thinner, while competitive powerlifters and American football players tend to be stockier. Athletic development often begins with athletic parents.

Physical conditioning is a primary athletic function for competition. Most often, trainers utilize proven athletic principles to develop athletic qualities; these qualities include coordination, flexibility, precision, power, speed, endurance, balance, awareness efficiency, and timing. While physical strength is prized over most other qualities in Western athletics, it is forbidden in the physical conditioning of tai chi.

Sports medicine not only treats injuries with medical procedure, but attempts to prevent problems such as trauma and overuse injuries. Sports medicine can also include the use of massage, glucose testing, Rolfing, physical therapy, and performance-enhancing drugs like caffeine and anabolic steroids.

Sports nutrition is the study and practice of nutrition and diet as they relate to athletic performance. It is concerned with the type and quantity of fluid and food taken by an athlete, and deals with nutrients such as vitamins, minerals, supplements and organic substances such as carbohydrates, proteins and fats. Although an important part of many sports training regimens, it is most intensely applied in strength sports (such as weight lifting and bodybuilding) and endurance sports (for example cycling, running, swimming).

== Training and coaching ==
Athletes first learn basic movement patterns such as running, stopping, jumping and throwing. Coaches help athletes refine these movements into sport specific skills. A skill such as high jumping can then be refined into a competitive technique like the Western roll or the Fosbury Flop. An individual's expression of a technique is often called a style; while various competitive swimming strokes are also called styles. Team sports often develop and practice plays or strategies where players carry out specific tasks to coordinate a team effort of attack or defense.

Technical training may also include teaching the rules and restrictions of a sport or game.

Elite athletes and teams require high-level coaching. A coach is often associated only with an athlete's technical development; however, a coach will likely play all the roles of mentor, physical trainer, therapist, medical responder, technical trainer and performance facilitator. Coaches may or may not involve sportsmanship in their program. Coaching typically signifies a quadrennial, ongoing mentorship for athletic development, as opposed to a clinician who might only assist for a short period of time.

Not only must coaches be able to teach technical form, but recognize and correct problems with a teams' or an athlete's technique and conditioning. This is done by listening, observing and building trust with the athlete. Recent advancements in video technology can provide accurate biomechanical data to optimize the form, precision, timing, efficiency and power of an athlete's movements.

Critical to a team's or an athlete's success is a winning attitude. Inherent in the drive to win is the ability to remain relaxed and focused under the pressure of competition. Modern athletic coaches employ the use of sports psychologists to help athletes organize themselves through visualization, relaxation techniques, self-talk, concentration, etc.

== Amateurs and professionals ==
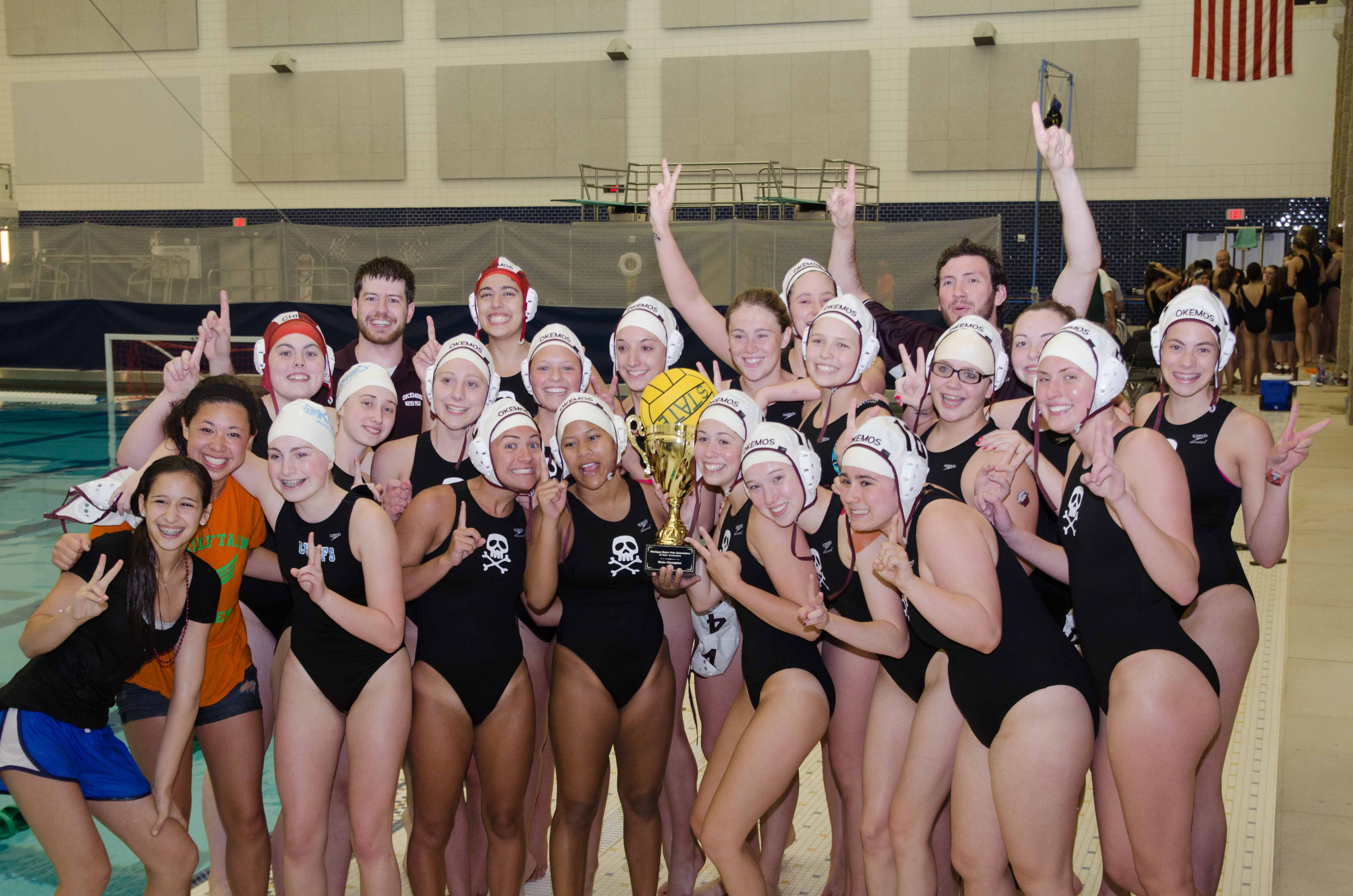
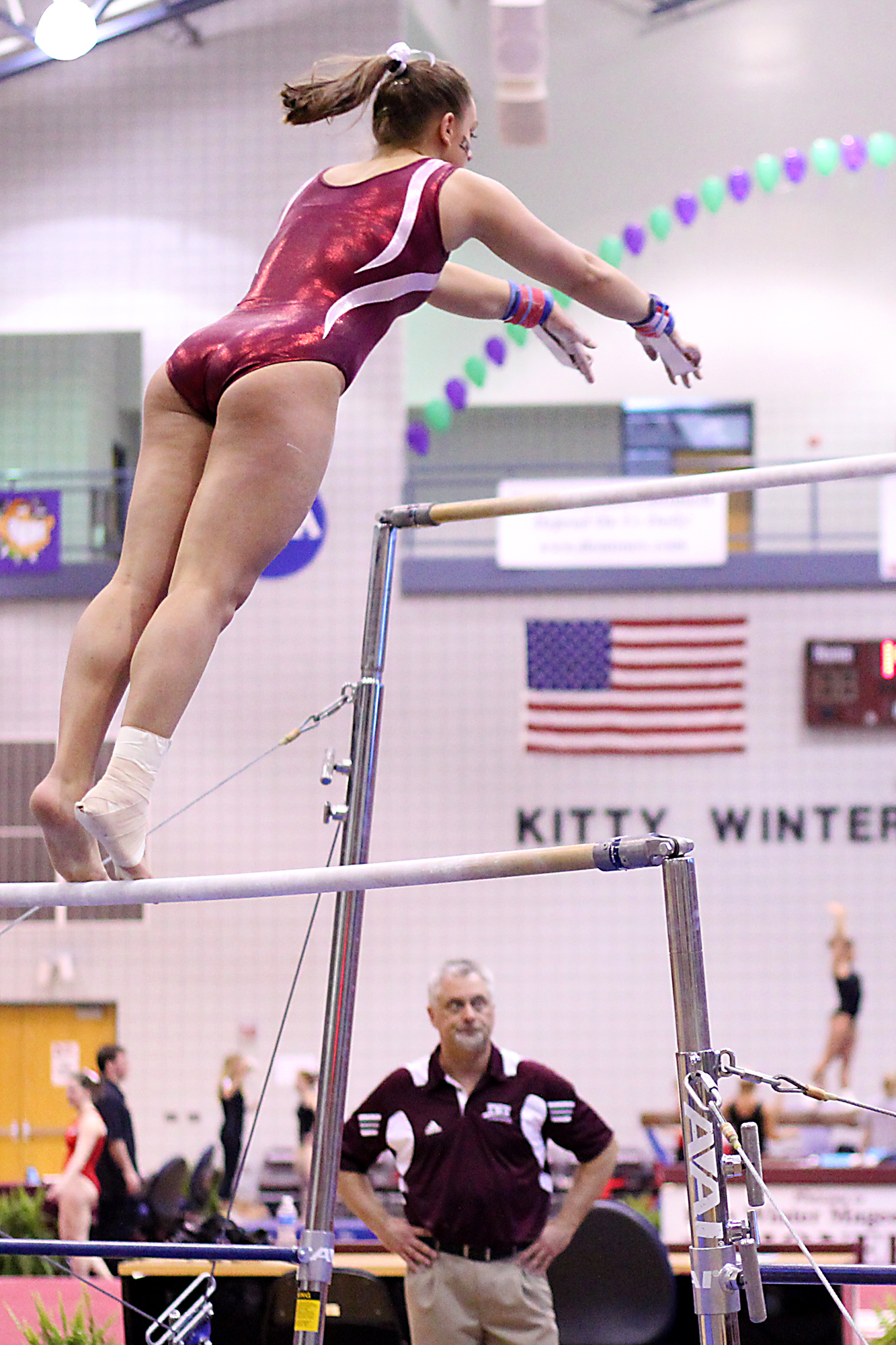
Left: A U.S. high school girls' water polo team (with their male coaches in background) posing with their trophy. Right: A U.S. university girl practising a difficult gymnastics manoeuvre under the watchful eyes of her coach.

Title IX of the Education Amendments of 1972 was created to prohibit sex discrimination in education programs that receive (U.S.) federal funding. The original statute made no reference to athletics or athletics programs. From 1972 to 2006, Title IX underwent a series of amendments for gender equity which became high impact on high school and collegiate athletics because it promoted maximum female participation in athletics through equal spending.

Professional sports are sports in which athletes receive payment for their performance. Professional athletics is seen by some as a contradiction of the central ethos of the sport since the competition is performed for its own sake and pure enjoyment rather than as a means of earning a living.

== Organizations ==
- International Olympic Committee
- National Collegiate Athletic Association
- Amateur Athletic Union
- Union des Sociétés Françaises de Sports Athlétiques
- World Athletics
- Chin Woo Athletic Association
- National Association of Intercollegiate Athletics
- Association for Intercollegiate Athletics for Women

== See also ==
- Outline of sports
