= 1955 Purdue Boilermakers football team =

American college football season

1955 Purdue Boilermakers football
- Conference: Big Ten Conference
- Record: 5–3–1 (4–2–1 Big Ten)
- Head coach: Stu Holcomb (9th season)
- MVP: Joe Krupa
- Captains: Joe Krupa; Bill Murakowski
- Home stadium: Ross–Ade Stadium

1955 Big Ten Conference football standings
| | Conf. | | | | | Overall |
| Team | W | | L | | T | W | | L | | T |
|---|---|---|---|---|---|---|---|---|---|---|
| No. 5 Ohio State $ | 6 | – | 0 | – | 0 | 7 | – | 2 | – | 0 |
| No. 2 Michigan State | 5 | – | 1 | – | 0 | 9 | – | 1 | – | 0 |
| No. 12 Michigan | 5 | – | 2 | – | 0 | 7 | – | 2 | – | 0 |
| Purdue | 4 | – | 2 | – | 1 | 5 | – | 3 | – | 1 |
| Illinois | 3 | – | 3 | – | 1 | 5 | – | 3 | – | 1 |
| Wisconsin | 3 | – | 4 | – | 0 | 4 | – | 5 | – | 0 |
| Iowa | 2 | – | 3 | – | 1 | 3 | – | 5 | – | 1 |
| Minnesota | 2 | – | 5 | – | 0 | 3 | – | 6 | – | 0 |
| Indiana | 1 | – | 5 | – | 0 | 3 | – | 6 | – | 0 |
| Northwestern | 0 | – | 6 | – | 1 | 0 | – | 8 | – | 1 |
$ – Conference champion; Rankings from AP Poll

The 1955 Purdue Boilermakers football team was an American football team that represented Purdue University during the 1955 Big Ten Conference football season. In their ninth and final season under head coach Stu Holcomb, the Boilermakers compiled a 5–3–1 record, finished in fourth place in the Big Ten Conference with a 4–2–1 record against conference opponents, and outscored opponents by a total of 113 to 103.

Notable players on the 1955 Purdue team included quarterback Len Dawson, end Lamar Lundy, tackle Joe Krupa, and back Bill Murakowski.

== Schedule ==
| Date | Opponent | Rank | Site | Result | Attendance | Source |
|---|---|---|---|---|---|---|
| September 24 | Pacific (CA)* | No. 19 | Ross–Ade Stadium; West Lafayette, IN | W 14–7 | 44,500 | |
| October 1 | at Minnesota | | Memorial Stadium; Minneapolis, MN | W 7–6 | 59,019 | |
| October 8 | No. 9 Wisconsin^{†} | No. 17 | Ross–Ade Stadium; West Lafayette, IN | L 0–9 | 45,000 | |
| October 15 | at Iowa | | Iowa Stadium; Iowa City, IA | T 20–20 | 52,137 | |
| October 22 | No. 11 Notre Dame* | | Ross–Ade Stadium; West Lafayette, IN (rivalry) | L 7–22 | 55,000 | |
| October 29 | at Illinois | | Memorial Stadium; Champaign, IL (rivalry) | W 13–0 | 61,262 | |
| November 5 | No. 4 Michigan State | | Ross–Ade Stadium; West Lafayette, IN | L 0–27 | 41,000 | |
| November 12 | Northwestern | | Ross–Ade Stadium; West Lafayette, IN | W 46–8 | 27,000 | |
| November 19 | at Indiana | | Memorial Stadium; Bloomington, IN (Old Oaken Bucket) | W 6–4 | 30,945–35,000 | |
*Non-conference game; ^{†}Homecoming; Rankings from AP Poll released prior to the game

== Roster ==
- Erich Barnes, WR
- Bob Clasey, OL
- Len Dawson, QB
- Mel Dillard, RB
- Tommy Fletcher, RB
- Neil Habig, OL
- Bob Khoenle, WR
- Joe Krupa, OL
- Lamar Lundy, WR
- Bill Murakowski, RB
- Dick Murley, OL
- Ed Neves, RB
- Ken Panfil, OL
- Jim Peters, RB
- John Simerson, OL
- Dick Skibinski, OL
- Ed Voytek, OL
- Jim Whitmer, RB
- Len Zyzda, WR
