= Duffy Daugherty =

American football player and coach (1915–1987)

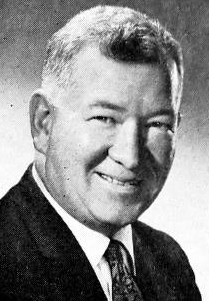

Biographical details
- Born: September 8, 1915; Emeigh, Pennsylvania, U.S.
- Died: September 25, 1987 (aged 72); Santa Barbara, California, U.S.

Playing career
- 1937–1939: Syracuse
- Position: Guard

Coaching career (HC unless noted)
- 1940, 1946: Syracuse (line)
- 1947–1953: Michigan State (line)
- 1954–1972: Michigan State

Head coaching record
- Overall: 109–69–5
- Bowls: 1–1

Accomplishments and honors

Championships
- 4 national (1955, 1957, 1965–1966); 2 Big Ten (1965–1966)

Awards
- AFCA Coach of the Year (1955); Eddie Robinson Coach of the Year (1965); Sporting News College Football COY (1965); Walter Camp Man of the Year (1973); Amos Alonzo Stagg Award (1985); Michigan State Hall Of Fame (1992)
- College Football Hall of Fame; Inducted in 1984 (profile)

Hugh Duffy Daugherty (September 8, 1915 – September 25, 1987) was an American football player and coach. He served as the head coach at Michigan State University from 1954 to 1972, compiling a record of 109–69–5. His 1955 and 1957 and 1965 and 1966 teams won national championships. Daugherty's tenure of 19 seasons at the helm of the Michigan State Spartans football team is the longest of any head coach in the program's history. He was inducted into the College Football Hall of Fame as a coach in 1984.

== Early years, playing career, and military service ==
Daugherty was born in Emeigh, Pennsylvania, on September 8, 1915. Though Daugherty would later become known as "the Irish pixie, short and stocky, a man of endearing charm, with smiles and jokes," both of his parents were Pennsylvania natives whose parents were immigrants from Scotland. His father, Joseph Daugherty, was the manager of a general merchandise store at Susquehanna in 1920. By 1930, the family had moved to Barnesboro, Pennsylvania, where Daugherty's father was working as an adjuster for a compensation and insurance company. Daugherty had two older brothers, John and Joseph, Jr., and a younger sister Jean.

Raised as a Presbyterian, he converted to Catholicism in 1964. Daugherty played college football as a guard at Syracuse University. He was named co-captain of the Syracuse football team in his senior year in 1939. He enlisted in the United States Army on February 7, 1941, ten months before the United States entered World War II.

In his enlistment papers, Daugherty listed his residence as Onondaga County, New York, and his occupation as "unskilled machine shop and related occupations." His height was recorded at 68 inches and his weight at 175 pounds. While serving in the Army, Daugherty was promoted from private to major and earned the Bronze Star.

== Early coaching career ==
In 1946, upon his return from the war, Daugherty became an assistant coach in charge of linemen at Syracuse under Biggie Munn.

In December 1946, when Munn was hired to become the new head coach at Michigan State University for the 1947 season, Daugherty moved to East Lansing with him. Munn's teams had a great deal of success, winning the AP national championship in 1952. The next year, in their first year of Big Ten Conference play, Michigan State tied for the conference title with Illinois and defeated UCLA in the 1954 Rose Bowl. With Munn as head coach and Daugherty as an assistant, the Michigan State football team compiled a record of 54–9–2. The Michigan State lines coached by Daugherty in those years became known as "Duffy's Toughies."

In December 1953, following Munn's promotion to Michigan State's athletic director, Daugherty became Michigan State's head football coach, the 15th in the history of Michigan State football. He became well known for his humorous quips during press conferences.

== Michigan State head coach ==
After compiling a disappointing 3–6 record in Daugherty's first season in 1954, the Spartans improved and finished second in the Big Ten behind Ohio State in 1955 with an 8–1 record in the regular season. Michigan State received the conference's invitation to the 1956 Rose Bowl instead of the Buckeyes due to the conference's prohibition against consecutive trips to the Rose Bowl. In Pasadena, the Spartans defeated UCLA, 17–14, for their second bowl win in school history and Daugherty was voted coach of the year by the largest percentage in the history of the award.

From 1956 to 1964, Daugherty's Michigan State teams were usually strong, three times placing second in the Big Ten, but never captured the conference crown. The Spartans did, however, beat Notre Dame eight straight times between 1955 and 1963, a feat matched only by Michigan (1887–1908) and USC (2002–2009).

In 1962, the University of Nebraska offered Daugherty their head coaching position. Not wishing to leave Michigan State for a rebuilding program, Daugherty turned it down, but recommended his former assistant, Bob Devaney, for the position. The Cornhuskers hired Devaney, who would turn Nebraska into a national power.

The 1965 and 1966 seasons were the high points in Daugherty's coaching tenure, if not in the history of Michigan State football. The 1965 team finished the regular season 10–0 and ranked first in the country, but was upset by UCLA in the 1966 Rose Bowl, 14–12. Nevertheless, Michigan State was named national champions by the UPI and the National Football Foundation. The 1966 team began the season 9–0 and headed into their final game ranked #2 against #1 Notre Dame at Spartan Stadium on November 19. The #1 vs. #2 showdown, dubbed the "Game of the Century" by national media, ended in a 10–10 tie. The Spartans did not play in a bowl game following the 1966 season due to Big Ten rules in place at the time that prohibited its teams from playing in the Rose Bowl in consecutive years and barred participation in any other bowl. Notre Dame was named the national champion in both major polls, but Michigan State received a share of the National Football Foundation's title with the Fighting Irish.

Beginning with the 1967 season, there was a significant decline in the Spartans football program. Daugherty's teams in the late 1960s and early 1970s consistently hovered around the .500 mark, with only his 1971 squad finishing with a winning record (6–5). Dissatisfaction from segments of the Michigan State alumni factored into Daugherty announcing on November 3 his resignation as head coach upon the conclusion of the 1972 season. Spartans defensive coordinator/linebacker coach Denny Stolz was promoted to succeed Daugherty on December 12, 1972.

During Daugherty's time in East Lansing, he recruited and coached 32 All-Americans, some of the best players in Michigan State's history, including Herb Adderley, Brad Van Pelt, Bubba Smith, George Webster, and Joe DeLamielleure. He recruited black players upon arrival in East Lansing in 1947, and his recruiting strategy was dubbed "The Underground Railroad." He was one of the first college football coaches to field a racially integrated team. His 1966 team featured four of the first eight players in the 1967 NFL draft, all of them black.

Daugherty's 109 wins were the most in Spartans history until Mark Dantonio surpassed him in a 31–10 victory over Northwestern at Ryan Field on September 21, 2019.

== Later life and honors ==
Daugherty was a color commentator alongside Chris Schenkel and Bud Wilkinson on ABC Sports' college football telecasts beginning in 1973. He died at the age of 72 on September 25, 1987, at Santa Barbara Cottage Hospital in Santa Barbara, California, after being hospitalized a month earlier with heart and kidney problems.

To honor his accomplishments at Michigan State, the university named the football team's practice facility the Duffy Daugherty Football Building. The Duffy Daugherty Memorial Award is presented annually to a person for lifetime achievement and outstanding contribution to amateur football. Duffy was elected to the College Football Hall of Fame in 1984 and the Michigan Sports Hall of Fame in 1975.

== Coaching tree ==
Played under:

- Ossie Solem: Syracuse

Coached under:

- Biggie Munn: Syracuse, Michigan State

Assistant coaches who became head coaches:

- Dan Boisture: Eastern Michigan, Detroit Wheels (WFL)
- Hank Bullough: New England Patriots (NFL), Buffalo Bills (NFL)
- Vince Carillot: Tulsa
- Al Dorow: Hamilton Tiger Cats (CFL)
- Rollie Dotsch: Northern Michigan, Birmingham Stallions (USFL)
- Bob Devaney: Wyoming, Nebraska
- Dan Devine: Arizona State, Missouri, Notre Dame, Green Bay Packers (NFL)
- Sonny Grandelius: Colorado
- John McVay: Dayton, Memphis Southmen (WFL), New York Giants (NFL)
- George Perles: Philadelphia Stars (USFL), Michigan State
- Cal Stoll: Wake Forest, Minnesota
- Denny Stolz: Alma, Michigan State, Bowling Green, San Diego State
- Doug Weaver: Kansas State, Southern Illinois
- Bill Yeoman: Houston

Former players who went on to become head coaches

- Chuck Fairbanks: Oklahoma, New England Patriots (NFL), Colorado, New Jersey Generals (USFL)
- Dick Flynn: Central Michigan
- Wayne Fontes: Detroit Lions (NFL)
- Tyrone Willingham: Stanford, Notre Dame, Washington

== Head coaching record ==
| Year | Team | Overall | Conference | Standing | Bowl/playoffs | Coaches^{#} | AP^{°} |
|---|---|---|---|---|---|---|---|
Michigan State Spartans (Big Ten Conference) (1954–1972)
| 1954 | Michigan State | 3–6 | 1–5 | T–8th | | | |
| 1955 | Michigan State | 9–1 | 5–1 | 2nd | W Rose | 2 | 2 |
| 1956 | Michigan State | 7–2 | 4–2 | T–4th | | 10 | 9 |
| 1957 | Michigan State | 8–1 | 5–1 | 2nd | | 3 | 3 |
| 1958 | Michigan State | 3–5–1 | 0–5–1 | 10th | | | |
| 1959 | Michigan State | 5–4 | 4–2 | 2nd | | 16 | |
| 1960 | Michigan State | 6–2–1 | 4–2 | 4th | | 13 | 15 |
| 1961 | Michigan State | 7–2 | 5–2 | 3rd | | 9 | 8 |
| 1962 | Michigan State | 5–4 | 3–3 | T–5th | | | |
| 1963 | Michigan State | 6–2–1 | 4–1–1 | T–2nd | | 10 | 9 |
| 1964 | Michigan State | 4–5 | 3–3 | 6th | | 20 | |
| 1965 | Michigan State | 10–1 | 7–0 | 1st | L Rose | 1 | 2 |
| 1966 | Michigan State | 9–0–1 | 7–0 | 1st | | 2 | 2 |
| 1967 | Michigan State | 3–7 | 3–4 | T–5th | | | |
| 1968 | Michigan State | 5–5 | 2–5 | 7th | | | |
| 1969 | Michigan State | 4–6 | 2–5 | 9th | | | |
| 1970 | Michigan State | 4–6 | 3–4 | T–5th | | | |
| 1971 | Michigan State | 6–5 | 5–3 | T–3rd | | | |
| 1972 | Michigan State | 5–5–1 | 5–2–1 | 4th | | | |
| Michigan State: | | 109–69–5 | 72–50–3 | | | | |
| Total: | | 109–69–5 | | | | | |
National championship Conference title Conference division title or championship game berth
^{#}Rankings from final Coaches Poll.; ^{°}Rankings from final AP Poll.
