= Ed Meads =

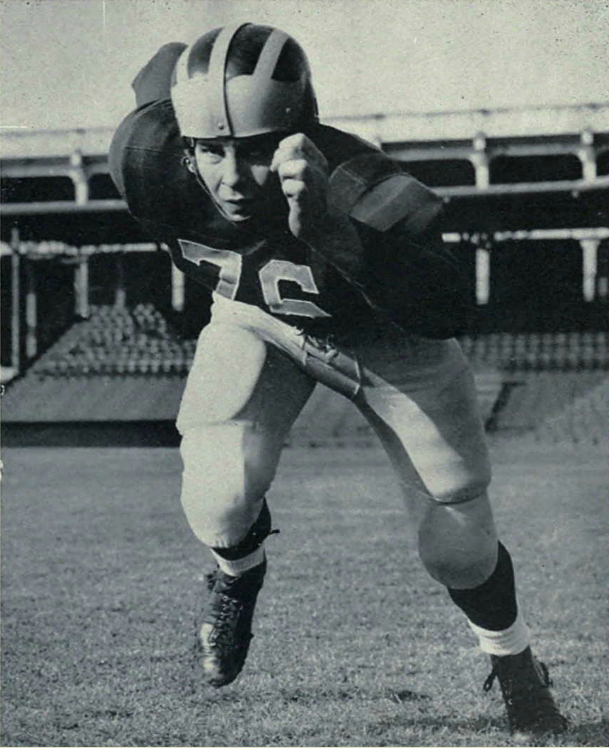
- Meads from 1956 Michiganensian

Profile
- Positions: Guard, Center

Personal information
- Born: c. 1935; Oxford, Michigan, U.S.
- Died: October 24, 2022

Career information
- College: Michigan, Western Ontario

George Edgar "Ed" Meads, Jr. (born c. 1935) was an American and Canadian football player, military field surgeon, and professor of surgery. He played college football for the University of Michigan from 1953 to 1955 and was selected as the captain of the 1955 Michigan Wolverines football team. He also played college football at the University of Western Ontario (UWO) in 1957 while attending medical school. He was selected to 1957 All-Canada team and led UWO to the 1957 Canadian national football championship.

Meads later served as a surgeon at two field hospitals during the Vietnam War and received a Bronze Star Medal in 1969 for his contributions there. He later served as a professor of surgery for 34 years at UWO.

== Early life ==
Meads was raised in Oxford, Michigan. His father, Dr. George Edgar Meads, Sr., was a dentist and an alumnus of the University of Michigan. Meads was a star athlete at Oxford High School, receiving a total of 12 varsity letters in football, basketball, baseball, and track. He earned all-state honors in the half-mile.

== Michigan ==
Meads received a University of Michigan Regent's Scholarship, an academic award, to attend the University of Michigan. He enrolled in 1952 and played for the school's all-freshman football team. As a sophomore, he was a backup for the 1953 team.

As a junior, Meads started all nine games at right guard for the 1954 Michigan Wolverines football team. That team compiled a 6-3 record and was ranked No. 15 in the final AP and UPI polls. On October 16, 1954, made the key play in Michigan's 7-0 victory over Northwestern. After a Northwestern fumble, Meads recovered the ball at the Northwestern 24-yard line. Meads' recover set up the only touchdown of the game.

As a senior, Meads was chosen as the captain of the 1955 Michigan Wolverines football team. He later recalled, "And when I became a captain as a senior, it surpassed my wildest expectations and dreams." Meads started all nine games at right guard, and the team finished the season with a 7-2 record and ranked No. 12 and No. 11 in the final AP and UPI polls. Meads was selected to play in the Senior Bowl in Mobile, Alabama on January 7, 1956.

While attending Michigan, Meads was also a member of the Sphnix and Michigamua honor societies. He graduated from Michigan in 1956.

== Western Ontario ==
After graduating from Michigan, Meads enrolled in medical school at the University of Western Ontario (UWO). He played football at the center position for the UWO football team in 1957. At the conclusion of the season, Meads was selected by the Canadian Press, coaches, and sports writers as a first-team player on the Senior Intercollegiate Football Union 1957 all-star team. He also helped lead the Western Ontario Mustangs to the 1957 Canadian national football championship and was named the 1957 most valuable player.

Meads played for UWO again in 1958, but suffered a concussion. UWO's head coach John Metras refused to let Meads remain on the team out of concern that Meads could suffer a further injury. Meads later spoke about Metras: "He was a very caring and sensitive coach whose exterior belied the interior feeling and warmth he had for his players."

== Later life ==
Meads became a doctor in the 1960s. In the late 1960s, he joined the United States Army Medical Corps. Serving with the rank of Major, he was chief of surgery at field hospitals during the Vietnam War. He received a Bronze Star Medal in 1969. After his discharge from the U.S. military, Meads settled in London, Ontario. He was the chief of surgery at St. Joseph Hospital from 1980 to 1990. He was also a professor of surgery at UWO for 34 years.

In 2010, Meads became one of the inaugural inductees into the Oxford Athletic Hall of Fame. He has also been inducted into the UWO Athletics Hall of Fame.
