= 1955 Michigan Wolverines football team =

American college football season

1955 Michigan Wolverines football
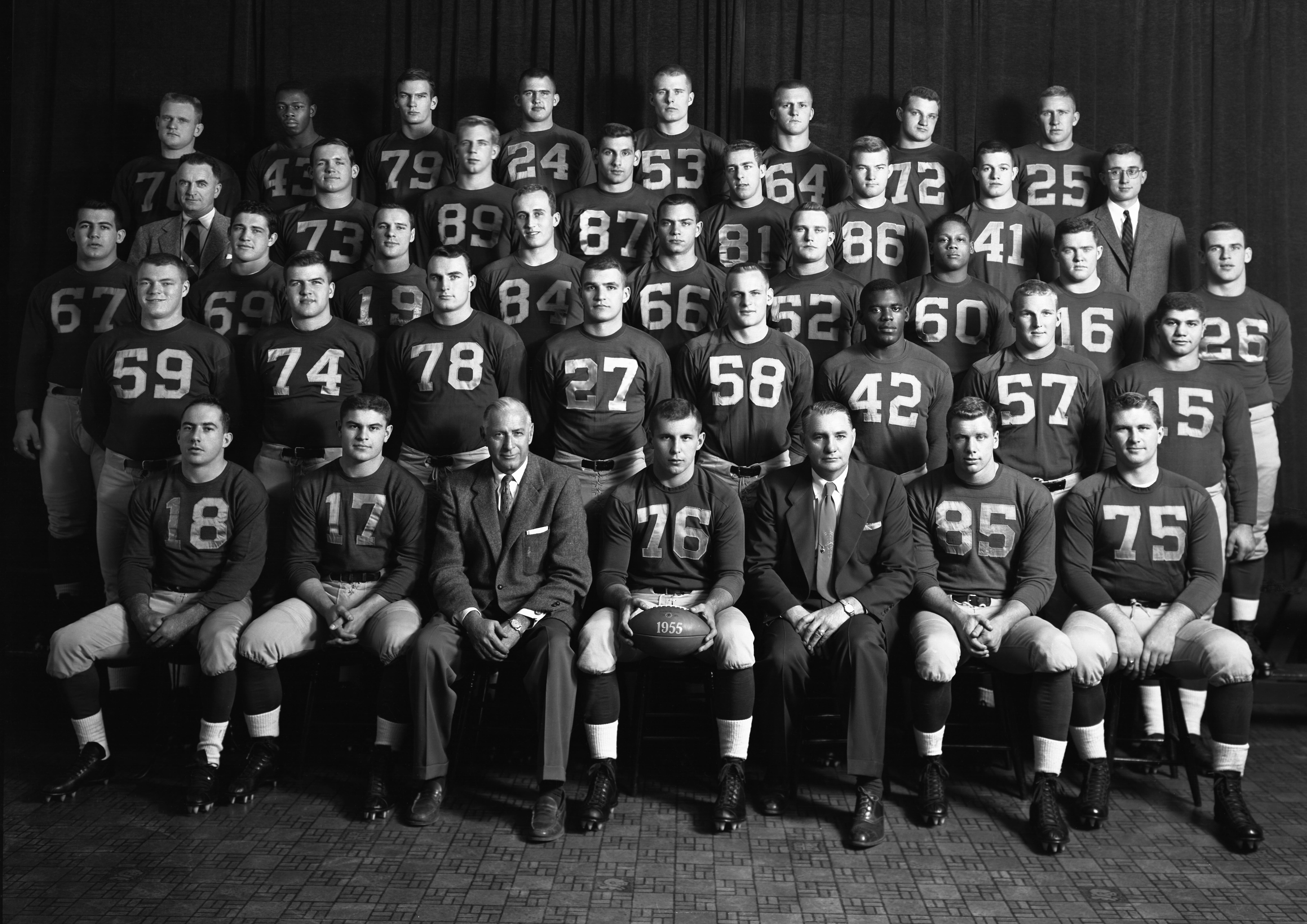
- Conference: Big Ten Conference

Ranking
- Coaches: No. 13
- AP: No. 12
- Record: 7–2 (5–2 Big Ten)
- Head coach: Bennie Oosterbaan (8th season)
- MVP: Terry Barr
- Captain: Ed Meads
- Home stadium: Michigan Stadium

1955 Big Ten Conference football standings
| | Conf. | | | | | Overall |
| Team | W | | L | | T | W | | L | | T |
|---|---|---|---|---|---|---|---|---|---|---|
| No. 5 Ohio State $ | 6 | – | 0 | – | 0 | 7 | – | 2 | – | 0 |
| No. 2 Michigan State | 5 | – | 1 | – | 0 | 9 | – | 1 | – | 0 |
| No. 12 Michigan | 5 | – | 2 | – | 0 | 7 | – | 2 | – | 0 |
| Purdue | 4 | – | 2 | – | 1 | 5 | – | 3 | – | 1 |
| Illinois | 3 | – | 3 | – | 1 | 5 | – | 3 | – | 1 |
| Wisconsin | 3 | – | 4 | – | 0 | 4 | – | 5 | – | 0 |
| Iowa | 2 | – | 3 | – | 1 | 3 | – | 5 | – | 1 |
| Minnesota | 2 | – | 5 | – | 0 | 3 | – | 6 | – | 0 |
| Indiana | 1 | – | 5 | – | 0 | 3 | – | 6 | – | 0 |
| Northwestern | 0 | – | 6 | – | 1 | 0 | – | 8 | – | 1 |
$ – Conference champion; Rankings from AP Poll

The 1955 Michigan Wolverines football team was an American football team that represented the University of Michigan in the 1955 Big Ten Conference football season. In their eighth season under head coach Bennie Oosterbaan, the Wolverines finished in third place in the Big Ten Conference, compiled a 7–2 record (5–2 against Big Ten opponents), and were ranked No. 12 and No. 13 in the final AP and UPI Polls.

In the second week of the season, the Wolverines defeated Michigan State, 14–7. The game was the only loss of the season for Michigan State which was ranked No. 2 in the final AP and UPI polls. The Wolverines were ranked No. 2 in the country after defeating the Spartans and rose to No. 1 after defeating the No. 6-ranked Army football team by a 26–2 score the following week. In late October 1955, quarterback Jim Maddock threw touchdown passes of 65 and 60 yard in the fourth quarter to lead a come-from-behind victory over Iowa in a nationally televised game. After starting the season 6–0, the team lost to Illinois on November 5. In the final game of the season, the Wolverines were favored but lost to Ohio State on November 19.

Left end Ron Kramer was a consensus first-team All-American. Kramer and right end Tom Maentz were nicknamed the "touchdown twins," became the first Michigan football players to appear on the cover of Sports Illustrated, and were both first-team selections for the All-Big Ten team. Left halfback Terry Barr was selected as the team's most valuable player. The team's statistical leaders were Tony Branoff with 387 rushing yards, Jim Maddock with 343 passing yards, and Tom Maentz with 253 receiving yards.

== Schedule ==
| Date | Opponent | Rank | Site | Result | Attendance | Source |
|---|---|---|---|---|---|---|
| September 24 | Missouri* | No. 4 | Michigan Stadium; Ann Arbor, MI | W 42–7 | 51,801 | |
| October 1 | Michigan State | No. 2 | Michigan Stadium; Ann Arbor, MI (rivalry) | W 14–7 | 97,239 | |
| October 8 | No. 6 Army* | No. 2 | Michigan Stadium; Ann Arbor, MI | W 26–2 | 97,239–97,366 | |
| October 15 | Northwestern | No. 1 | Michigan Stadium; Ann Arbor, MI (rivalry) | W 14–2 | 76,703 | |
| October 22 | at Minnesota | No. 1 | Memorial Stadium; Minneapolis, MN (Little Brown Jug) | W 14–13 | 64,434 | |
| October 29 | Iowa^{†} | No. 3 | Michigan Stadium; Ann Arbor, MI | W 33–21 | 73,275 | |
| November 5 | at Illinois | No. 3 | Memorial Stadium; Champaign, IL (rivalry) | L 6–25 | 58,968 | |
| November 12 | Indiana | No. 7 | Michigan Stadium; Ann Arbor, MI | W 30–0 | 60,613 | |
| November 19 | No. 9 Ohio State | No. 6 | Michigan Stadium; Ann Arbor, MI (rivalry) | L 0–17 | 97,369 | |
*Non-conference game; ^{†}Homecoming; Rankings from AP Poll released prior to the game

== Season summary ==
=== Preseason ===
The 1954 Michigan Wolverines football team compiled a 6–3 record (5–2 Big Ten), finished in third place in the conference, and was ranked No. 15 in the final AP and UP polls. At the end of the 1954 season, right guard Ed Meads, a junior from Oxford, Michigan, was selected by his teammates to be captain of the 1955 team.

In May 1955, freshman quarterback Jim Van Pelt received the team's Meyer W. Morton trophy as the most improved player in spring practice.

=== Missouri ===
Week 1: Missouri at Michigan

| Team | 1 | 2 | 3 | 4 | Total |
|---|---|---|---|---|---|
| Missouri | 7 | 0 | 0 | 0 | 7 |
| • Michigan | 0 | 21 | 7 | 14 | 42 |

- Date: September 24
- Location: Ann Arbor, MI
- Game attendance: 55,607

Scoring summary
| 1 | MIZZ | Dick Stuber 12-yard pass from Jerry Hunter (Chuck Mehrer kick) | MIZZ 7–0 |
| 2 | MICH | Ron Kramer 14-yard pass and run from Jim Van Pelt (Kramer kick) | TIE 7–7 |
| 2 | MICH | Lou Baldacci 2-yard run (Kramer kick) | MICH 14–7 |
| 2 | MICH | Kramer 22-yard pass from Baldacci (Kramer kiss) | MICH 21–7 |
| 3 | MICH | Baldacci 1-yard run (Kramer kick) | MICH 28–7 |
| 4 | MICH | Kramer 13-yard pass from Baldacci (Kramer kick) | MICH 35–7 |
| 4 | MICH | Mike Rotunno 81-yard interception return (Van Pelt kick) | MICH 42–7 |

On September 23, Michigan opened its season with a 42–7 victory over Don Faurot's Missouri Tigers. The game was played before a crowd of 55,608 at Michigan Stadium. Left end Ron Kramer scored 23 points for Michigan on three touchdowns and five extra points. The Wolverines out-gained the Tigers by 318 yards (164 rushing, 154 passing) to 115 yards (48 rushing, 67 passing).

=== Michigan State ===
Week 2: Michigan State at Michigan

| Team | 1 | 2 | 3 | 4 | Total |
|---|---|---|---|---|---|
| Michigan State | 0 | 0 | 7 | 0 | 7 |
| • Michigan | 7 | 0 | 7 | 0 | 14 |

- Date: October 1
- Location: Ann Arbor, MI
- Game attendance: 97,239

Scoring summary
| 1 | MICH | Tony Branoff 2-yard run (kick by Ron Kramer) | MICH 7–0 |
| 3 | MSU | Jerry Planutis 1-yard run (kick by Planutis) | TIE 7–7 |
| 3 | MICH | Jim Maddock 1-yard run (kick by Kramer) | MICH 14–7 |

On October 1, Michigan defeated Michigan State, 14–7, before a crowd of 97,239 at Michigan Stadium. Michigan's first touchdown was set up when Michigan halfback Tony Branoff intercepted the first pass thrown by Michigan State quarterback Earl Morrall. Branoff returned the ball 38 yards to the Spartans' 20-yard line and scored the touchdown six plays later on a short run.

After a poor 24-yard punt by Ron Kramer, Michigan State tied the game in the third quarter on a short run and extra-point kick by fullback Jerry Planutis. Later in the third quarter, John Morrow blocked an Earl Morrall punt, and Michigan took over at the Spartans' 21-yard line. Quarterback Jim Maddock scored on a short run, and Kramer kicked the extra point to give Michigan a 14–7 lead. The Spartans out-gained the Wolverines by totals of 215 yards to 151 yards and had twice as many first downs.

=== Army ===
Week 3: Army at Michigan

| Team | 1 | 2 | 3 | 4 | Total |
|---|---|---|---|---|---|
| Army | 0 | 0 | 0 | 2 | 2 |
| • Michigan | 6 | 6 | 0 | 14 | 26 |

- Date: October 8
- Location: Ann Arbor, MI
- Game attendance: 97,239

Scoring summary
| 1 | MICH | Terry Barr 1-yard run (kick by Ron Kramer failed) | MICH 6–0 |
| 2 | MICH | Barr 82-yard punt return (kick by Jim Van Pelt failed) | MICH 12–0 |
| 4 | MICH | Ed Shannon 1-yard run (Branoff run) | MICH 19–0 |
| 4 | MICH | Jim Pace 4-yard run (Van Pelt kick) | MICH 26–0 |
| 4 | ARMY | John Greenwood safety (tackled by Flay Goodwin in end zone) | MICH 26–2 |

On October 8, Michigan (ranked No. 2) defeated Army (ranked No. 6) by a score of 26–2 before a crowd of 97,239 at Michigan Stadium. Junior halfback Terry Barr led Michigan's offense and also scored on an 82-yard punt return in the second quarter. Army had scored 116 points in its first two games, but stalled against the Wolverines. The Cadets fumbled the ball nine times with Michigan recovering on eight. Adding to Army's offensive woes, the Cadets completed only one of 10 passes. It was Michigan's first victory against Army after five prior losses. It was also the worst defeat for an Army football team since 1952.

Michigan end Ron Kramer sustained a bruised chest in the second quarter, collapsed in the tunnel, and was rushed to University Hospital in an ambulance.

The game was also marked by a halftime incident when Secretary of the Army Wilber M. Brucker and top military brass attempted to cross the field and became tangled with the Michigan Marching Band. The Michigan Daily reported that the band was supposed to wait for the military contingent to cross the field, but Michigan band director William Revelli said he had not been informed of the trip.

=== Northwestern ===
Week 4: Northwestern at Michigan

| Team | 1 | 2 | 3 | 4 | Total |
|---|---|---|---|---|---|
| Northwestern | 0 | 7 | 0 | 0 | 7 |
| • Michigan | 7 | 0 | 0 | 7 | 14 |

- Date: October 15
- Location: Ann Arbor, MI
- Game attendance: 76,703

Scoring summary
| 1 | MICH | Earl Johnson 2-yard run (Tony Branoff kick) | MICH 7–0 |
| 2 | NW | Safety, Tony Branoff fumbled the snap in the end zone attempting to punt | MICH 7–2 |
| 4 | MICH | Terry Barr 46-yard run (Branoff kick) | MICH 14–2 |

On October 15, Michigan defeated Lou Saban's Northwestern Wildcats, 14–2, before a crowd of 76,703 at Michigan Stadium. Terry Barr's 46-yard touchdown run was the highlight for Michigan. In a defensive struggle, Northwestern out-gained Michigan by 173 yards (128 rushing, 45 passing) to 168 yards (150 rushing, 18 passing). It was the third consecutive week in which the Wolverines won despite being out-gained. The Wolverines converted only six first downs and completed only two of seven passes and threw an interception. Tommy Devine of the Detroit Free Press wrote that the Wolverines won despite being "flat, feeble and uninspired."

=== Minnesota ===
Week 5: Michigan at Minnesota

| Team | 1 | 2 | 3 | 4 | Total |
|---|---|---|---|---|---|
| • Michigan | 0 | 7 | 7 | 0 | 14 |
| Minnesota | 13 | 0 | 0 | 0 | 13 |

- Date: October 22
- Location: Minneapolis
- Game attendance: 64,434

Scoring summary
| 1 | MINN | Bob Schultz 8-yard run (Mike Falls kick) | MINN 7–0 |
| 1 | MINN | Ken Yackel 16-yard run (kick blocked by Terry Barr) | MINN 13–0 |
| 2 | MICH | Terry Barr 5-yard run (Tony Branoff kick) | MINN 13–7 |
| 3 | MICH | Tom Maentz 9-yard pass from Jim Van Pelt (Van Pelt kick) | MICH 14–13 |

On October 22, Michigan (ranked No. 1) defeated Murray Warmath's Minnesota Golden Gophers by a 14–13 score in the annual Little Brown Jug game before a crowd of 64,434 at Memorial Stadium in Minneapolis. Minnesota took a 13–0 lead with two touchdowns in the first quarter. Terry Barr closed the gap with a five-yard touchdown run near the end of the second quarter. Michigan took the lead in the third quarter on a nine-yard touchdown pass from Jim Van Pelt to Tom Maentz. Michigan dropped to No. 3 in the AP poll after the game.

=== Iowa ===
Week 6: Iowa at Michigan

| Team | 1 | 2 | 3 | 4 | Total |
|---|---|---|---|---|---|
| Iowa | 7 | 7 | 7 | 0 | 21 |
| • Michigan | 0 | 0 | 13 | 20 | 33 |

- Date: October 29
- Location: Ann Arbor, MI
- Game attendance: 72,096

Scoring summary
| 1 | IOWA | Ed Vincent 24-yard run (Freeman kick) | IOWA 7–0 |
| 2 | IOWA | Don Dobrino 1-yard run (Freeman kick) | MO 14–0 |
| 3 | MICH | Lou Baldacci 1-yard run (kick blocked) | IOWA 14–6 |
| 3 | IOWA | Dobrino 27-yard catch and run from Jerry Reichow (Freeman kick) | IOWA 21–6 |
| 3 | MICH | Tom Maentz 33-yard catch from Branoff | IOWA 21–13 |
| 4 | MICH | Ron Kramer 65-yard catch and run from Maddock (Kramer kick) | IOWA 21–20 |
| 4 | MICH | Maentz 60-yard catch and run from Maddock (Kramer kick) | MICH 27–21 |
| 4 | MICH | Tony Branoff 30-yard run (kick blocked) | MICH 33–21 |

On October 29, Michigan defeated Forest Evashevski's Iowa Hawkeyes by a score of 33–21 before a homecoming crowd of 72,096 and a national television audience at Michigan Stadium. Iowa took a 14–0 lead at halftime and 21–13 at the start of the fourth quarter.

Quarterback Jim Maddock came into the game in the fourth quarter and led the Wolverines to three touchdowns. On Maddock's first drive, Michigan was backed up to its 35-yard line after a sack. Maddock then threw a long pass to Ron Kramer; Kramer caught the ball at Iowa's 38-yard line and managed to stay in bounds as he ran along the sideline for a 65-yard touchdown. Kramer then kicked the extra point to bring the Wolverines within one point (21–20) with 8:50 remaining.

After Kramer's touchdown, Iowa drove to Michigan's 28-yard line with a time-consuming ground attack. On fourth-and-one, Michigan's defense stopped Iowa's Jerry Reichow for a one-yard loss. Michigan took over with 3:37 remaining. After a pass interference penalty moved the ball to Michigan's 40-yard line, Maddock threw a long pass to Tom Maentz; Maentz caught the pass at the Iowa 25-yard line and ran into the end zone untouched. Kramer again kicked the extra point, and Michigan led, 26–21, with 3:24 remaining.

After the Maentz touchdown, Iowa threw four incomplete passes, and Michigan then took over with two-and-a-half minutes remaining. Tony Branoff ran 30 yards for Michigan's final touchdown. Kramer's kick was blocked, and Michigan won by a 33–21 score. The Michigan Daily described it as "perhaps the most thrilling game ever to be played in the Michigan Stadium." The Detroit Free Press called it "one of the greatest comebacks of this, or any, football season." The victory was Michigan's sixth straight.

=== Illinois ===
Week 7: Michigan at Illinois

| Team | 1 | 2 | 3 | 4 | Total |
|---|---|---|---|---|---|
| Michigan | 0 | 6 | 0 | 0 | 6 |
| • Illinois | 6 | 0 | 6 | 13 | 25 |

- Date: November 5
- Location: Champaign, IL
- Game attendance: 58,968

Scoring summary
| 1 | ILL | Bob Desenfants 25-yard pass from Lindbeck | ILL 6–0 |
| 2 | MICH | Tony Branoff 17-yard run | TIE 6–6 |
| 3 | ILL | Abe Woodson 24-yard run | ILL 12–6 |
| 4 | ILL | Bobby Mitchell 64-yard run (Dean Renn kick) | ILL 18–6 |
| 4 | ILL | Rolla McMullen 4-yard run | ILL 25–6 |

On November 5, Michigan (ranked No. 3) lost to Illinois by a 25–6 score before a crowd of 58,968 at Memorial Stadium in Champaign, Illinois. The game was tied, 6–6, at halftime, but the Illini scored three unanswered touchdowns in the second half. Sophomore halfback Bobby Mitchell gained 173 yards, including runs of 54 and 64 yards, on 10 carries for Illinois. After the loss, Michigan dropped to No. 7 in the AP poll.

=== Indiana ===
Week 8: Indiana at Michigan

| Team | 1 | 2 | 3 | 4 | Total |
|---|---|---|---|---|---|
| Indiana | 0 | 0 | 0 | 0 | 0 |
| • Michigan | 7 | 9 | 14 | 0 | 30 |

- Date: November 12
- Location: Ann Arbor, MI
- Game attendance: 60,613

Scoring summary
| 1 | MICH | Terry Barr 4-yard run (Ron Kramer kick) | MICH 7–0 |
| 2 | MICH | Jim Pace 20-yard run (Kramer kick) | MICH 14–0 |
| 2 | MICH | Safety, Tom Maentz downed Gene Cichowski on a bad snap into the end zone | MICH 16–0 |
| 4 | MICH | Lou Baldacci 1-yard run (Jim Maddock kick) | MICH 23–0 |
| 4 | MICH | Dave Hill 2-yard run (Jim Van Pelt kick) | MICH 30–0 |

On November 12, Michigan defeated Indiana, 30–0, before a crowd of 60,613 at Michigan Stadium. Michigan's defense held the Hoosiers to minus 26 rushing yards in the first half and 61 yards of total offense in the game. On offense, Michigan totaled 302 rushing yards and 71 passing yards.

=== Ohio State ===
Week 9: Ohio State at Michigan

| Team | 1 | 2 | 3 | 4 | Total |
|---|---|---|---|---|---|
| • Ohio State | 0 | 3 | 0 | 14 | 17 |
| Michigan | 0 | 0 | 0 | 0 | 0 |

- Date: November 19
- Location: Ann Arbor, MI
- Game attendance: 97,369

Scoring summary
| 2 | OHIO | Freddie Kriss field goal | OHIO 3–0 |
| 4 | OHIO | Howard Cassady run (kick by Sutherland failed) | OHIO 9–0 |
| 4 | OHIO | Safety, Aurealius Thomas tackled Terry Barr in the end zone | OHIO 9–0 |
| 4 | OHIO | Don Vicic run (kick failed) | OHIO 17–0 |

On November 19, Michigan (ranked No. 6) lost to Ohio State (No. 9) by a 17–0 score before a record crowd of 97,369 at Michigan Stadium. Heisman Trophy winner Howard "Hopalong" Cassady, playing in his final game for the Buckeyes, rushed for 146 yards on 28 carries. The Buckeyes out-gained the Wolverines by 333 rushing yards to 95. Neither team tallied significant yardage in the air: Michigan completed three of nine passes for 14 yards and gave up two interceptions; Ohio State completed one of three passes for four yards. A Michigan victory would have given the Wolverines a conference championship and sent the team to the 1956 Rose Bowl. Instead, Ohio State won the conference championship, and Michigan State received the conference's Rose Bowl invitation.

It was the Buckeyes' first victory at Michigan Stadium since 1937. The Michigan Daily called it "one of the darkest days in Michigan football history." At the end of the game, "18,000 fanatical Buckeye rooters . . . swept to the field in a thunderous display of hysteria."

=== Postseason ===
In the final AP Poll, Michigan was ranked No. 12. Michigan State was ranked No. 2, and Ohio State No. 5.

At a meeting of the team's lettermen held on November 28, left halfback Terry Barr was selected by as the team's most valuable player. At the same meeting, right end Tom Maentz was selected as captain of the 1956 team.

Left end Ron Kramer received numerous honors, including:

- Kramer finished eighth in the balloting for the 1955 Heisman Trophy.
- Kramer was selected as a consensus first-team end on the 1955 All-America college football team. He received first-team honors from the All-America Board, American Football Coaches Association/Collier's Weekly, Football Writers Association of America/Look magazine, International News Service, Newspaper Enterprise Association, Sporting News, United Press, Jet magazine, and the Walter Camp Football Foundation. On November 27, he appeared on the Ed Sullivan Show as part of the Collier's All-America team. He was ineligible for the Associated Press (AP) All-America team as a result of having missed games due to injury.
- Kramer was selected by the Associated Press as a first-team end on both the 1955 All-Big Ten Conference football team and the All-Midwestern football team.

End Tom Maentz also received multiple post-season honors including a second-team All-America designation from the AP, and a first-team All-Big Ten honors from the AP and UP, and first-team All-Midwest honors from the UP.

Other Michigan player receiving All-Big Ten honors were halfback Tony Branoff (UP-1), center James Bates (UP-2), guard Dick Hill (UP-3), and fullback Lou Baldacci (UP-3).

== Statistical leaders ==
=== Rushing ===
| Player | Attempts | Net yards | Yards per attempt | Touchdowns |
|---|---|---|---|---|
| Tony Branoff | 86 | 387 | 4.5 | 3 |
| Terry Barr | 63 | 245 | 3.9 | 4 |
| Lou Baldacci | 69 | 218 | 3.2 | 4 |

=== Passing ===
| Player | Attempts | Completions | Interceptions | Comp % | Yards | Yds/Comp | TD | Long |
|---|---|---|---|---|---|---|---|---|
| Jim Maddock | 52 | 20 | 3 | 38.5 | 343 | 17.1 | 2 | 65 |
| Jim Van Pelt | 21 | 9 | 1 | 42.9 | 139 | 15.4 | 2 | 36 |
| Terry Barr | 16 | 6 | 2 | 37.5 | 119 | 19.8 | 0 | 57 |

=== Receiving ===
| Player | Receptions | Yards | Yds/Recp | TD | Long |
|---|---|---|---|---|---|
| Tom Maentz | 11 | 253 | 23.0 | 3 | 60 |
| Ron Kramer | 12 | 224 | 18.7 | 4 | 65 |
| Terry Barr | 4 | 74 | 18.5 | 0 | 40 |

=== Kickoff returns ===
| Player | Returns | Yards | Yds/Return | TD | Long |
|---|---|---|---|---|---|
| Tony Branoff | 6 | 140 | 23.3 | 0 | 27 |
| Terry Barr | 4 | 84 | 21.0 | 0 | 25 |
| Ed Hickey | 3 | 63 | 21.0 | 0 | 28 |

=== Punt returns ===
| Player | Returns | Yards | Yds/Return | TD | Long |
|---|---|---|---|---|---|
| Terry Barr | 14 | 219 | 15.6 | 1 | 82 |
| Jim Pace | 4 | 69 | 17.3 | 0 | 34 |
| Tony Branoff | 8 | 58 | 7.3 | 0 | 11 |

== Personnel ==
=== Coaching staff ===
- Head coach: Bennie Oosterbaan
- Assistant coaches:

- Jack Blott - line coach
- Don Dufek
- Robert Hollway - assistant line coach
- Cliff Keen
- Pete Kinyon
- Matt Patanelli
- Don Robinson - backfield coach
- Walter Weber - freshman coach

- Trainer: Jim Hunt
- Manager: Casper Grathwol

=== Players ===
==== Starting backfield ====
The following players started at least three games in the backfield for the 1955 Michigan team:

- Lou Baldacci, fullback, senior, Akron, Ohio - started 7 games at fullback
- Terry Barr, halfback, junior, Grand Rapids, Michigan - started 9 games at left halfback
- Tony Branoff, halfback, senior, Flint, Michigan - started 9 games at right halfback
- Jim Maddock, quarterback, junior, Chicago, Illinois - started 6 games at quarterback
- Jim Van Pelt, quarterback, sophomore, Evanston, Illinois - started 3 games at quarterback

==== Starting linemen ====
The following players started at least three games in the line for the 1955 Michigan team:

- James V. Bates, center, senior, Farmington, Michigan - started 7 games at center
- Dick Hill, guard, junior, Gary, Indiana - started 9 games at left guard
- Ron Kramer, end, junior, East Detroit, Michigan - started 6 games at left end
- Tom Maentz, end, junior, Holland, Michigan - started 7 games at right end
- Ed Meads, guard, senior, Oxford, Michigan - started 9 games at right guard
- James B. Orwig, tackle, junior, Toledo, Ohio - started 9 games at left tackle
- Mike Rotunno, end, junior, Canton, Ohio - started 3 games at left end
- Lionel Albert Sigman, tackle, junior, Ann Arbor, Michigan - started 9 games at right tackle

==== Other letter winners ====
A total of 38 players received varsity letters for their participation on the 1955 football team. In addition to the starters referenced above, the following players also received varsity letters:

- James N. Bowman, center, senior, Charlevoix, Michigan - center
- Charles Brooks, end, junior, Marshall, Michigan - started 2 games at right end
- George R. Corey, halfback, senior, Baden, Pennsylvania
- Clement Corona, guard, junior, Berwick, Pennsylvania
- James H. Davies, tackle, junior, Muskegon Heights, Michigan
- Dale L. Eldred, guard, junior, Minneapolis, Minnesota
- Lawrence Faul, end, junior, River Forest, Illinois
- James W. Fox, guard, senior, Saginaw, Michigan
- Jerry P. Goebel, center, junior, Grosse Pointe, Michigan - started 2 games at center
- John Greenwood, quarterback, junior, Bay City, Michigan
- Thomas Hendricks, halfback, senior, Detroit, Michigan
- Richard B. Heynen, tackle, junior, Grand Rapids, Michigan
- Edward L. Hickey, halfback, senior, Anaconda, Montana
- David J. Hill, fullback, senior, Ypsilanti, Michigan
- Earl Johnson, Jr., fullback, senior, Muskegon Heights, Michigan
- Carl R. Kamhout, tackle, senior, Grand Haven, Michigan
- Stanley Knickerbocker, halfback, senior, Chelsea, Michigan
- William Kolesar, tackle, senior, Mentor, Ohio
- Robert L. Marion, guard, senior, Muskegon Heights, Michigan
- John M. Morrow, tackle, senior, Ann Arbor, Michigan
- Marvin R. Nyren, guard, junior, Des Plaines, Illinois
- Jim Pace, halfback, sophomore, Little Rock, Arkansas
- John Peckham, center, senior, Sioux Falls, South Dakota
- David F. Rentschler, end, senior, Detroit, Michigan
- Edward J. Shannon, halfback, junior, River Forest, Illinois - started 1 game at fullbackk

==== Reserves ====
The following additional players were awarded reserve letters.

- Peter J. Aluzzo, center, Detroit, Michigan
- George J. Armelagos, guard, Allen Park, Michigan
- Paul T. Baldwin, quarterback, senior, Escanaba, Michigan
- Thomas E. Berger, guard, sophomore, Detroit, Michigan
- Alex Bochnowski, guard, sophomore, Munster, Indiana
- James A. Dickey, quarterback, sophomore, Miamisburg, Ohio
- Jerry I. Gonser, end, senior, Saline, Michigan
- James P. Gray, tackle, freshman, Battle Creek, Michigan
- Robert L. Henderson, tackle, Evansville, Indiana
- Jerry Janecke, halfback, sophomore, Rock Island, Illinois
- Richard L. Ketteman, Toledo, Ohio
- Walter W. Klinge, halfback, sophomore, West Brooklyn, Illinois
- Charles H. Krahnke, guard, senior, Wyandotte, Michigan
- John C. Kreger, tackle, sophomore, Flat Rock, Michigan
- Frederick Krueger, end, sophomore, Allen Park, Michigan
- Jack Lousma, quarterback, sophomore, Ann Arbor, Michigan - Lousma became a NASA astronaut and politician. He was a member of the Skylab 3 crew in 1973 and the commander of STS-3, the third Space Shuttle mission in 1983.
- William MacPhee, center, sophomore, Grand Haven, Michigan
- Charles F. Matulis, halfback, junior, East Chicago, Indiana
- Ernest H. McCoy, halfback, State College, Pennsylvania
- Joseph H. McKoan, end, junior, Algonac, Michigan
- John A. Miller, end, Jackson, Michigan
- Gordon H. Morrow, end, sophomore, Ann Arbor, Michigan
- David G. Owen, tackle, junior, Milwaukee, Wisconsin
- Donald F. Rembiesa, center, sophomore, Dearborn, Michigan
- Mike Rodriguez, halfback, Ann Arbor, Michigan
- Richard J. Ruhuala, fullback, Flint, Michigan
- Michael Shatusky, halfback, junior, Menominee, Michigan
- Robert E. Sriver, halfback, senior, Mishawaka, Indiana
- William B. Steinmeyer, guard, junior, Toledo, Ohio
- Stephen J. Zervas, fullback, senior, Hazel Park, Michigan

==== Freshmen ====
- John Herrnstein
- Gary Prahst
- Bob Ptacek
- Willie Smith
- Tony Rio

== Awards and honors ==
- Captain: Ed Meads
- All-Americans: Ron Kramer
- All-Conference: Ron Kramer (AP and UP first team), Tom Maentz (AP and UP first team), Tony Branoff (UPI first team and AP honorable mention), Jim Bates (UP second team and AP honorable mention)
- Most Valuable Player: Terry Barr
- Meyer Morton Award: Jim Van Pelt
