= 1955 Michigan State Spartans football team =

American college football season

1955 Michigan State Spartans football

National champion (Boand) Rose Bowl champion

Rose Bowl, W 17–14 vs. UCLA
- Conference: Big Ten Conference

Ranking
- Coaches: No. 2
- AP: No. 2
- Record: 9–1 (5–1 Big Ten)
- Head coach: Duffy Daugherty (2nd season)
- MVP: Carl Nystrom
- Captain: Carl Nystrom
- Home stadium: Macklin Stadium

1955 Big Ten Conference football standings
	Conf.					Overall
Team	W		L		T	W		L		T
No. 5 Ohio State $	6	–	0	–	0	7	–	2	–	0
No. 2 Michigan State	5	–	1	–	0	9	–	1	–	0
No. 12 Michigan	5	–	2	–	0	7	–	2	–	0
Purdue	4	–	2	–	1	5	–	3	–	1
Illinois	3	–	3	–	1	5	–	3	–	1
Wisconsin	3	–	4	–	0	4	–	5	–	0
Iowa	2	–	3	–	1	3	–	5	–	1
Minnesota	2	–	5	–	0	3	–	6	–	0
Indiana	1	–	5	–	0	3	–	6	–	0
Northwestern	0	–	6	–	1	0	–	8	–	1
$ – Conference champion; Rankings from AP Poll

The 1955 Michigan State Spartans football team was an American football team that represented Michigan State University in the 1955 Big Ten Conference football season. In their third season playing in Big Ten Conference and their second season under head coach Duffy Daugherty, the Spartans compiled a 9–1 record (5–1 against Big Ten opponents), and outscored opponents by a total of 253 to 83. The team's sole loss was on the road and early in the season against rival Michigan by a 14–7 score.

In the final AP and UPI coaches polls, both released on November 28, 1955, Michigan State was ranked No. 2 behind No. 1 Oklahoma. In the UPI poll, the Sooners edged the Spartans by a narrow margin of 325 points to 309 points with seven of the coaches ranking Michigan State as the No. 1 team. In the AP poll, the Sooners tallied 3,581 points to 3,204 points for Michigan State. After the polls were finalized, the Spartans defeated No. 4 UCLA in the 1956 Rose Bowl. Neither the AP nor UPI conducted post-bowl polls in these years. Although most later rankings and analyses continued to recognize Oklahoma as the 1955 national champion, the Boand System recognized Michigan State as national champion.

Two Michigan State players, quarterback Earl Morrall and tackle Norm Masters, were selected as consensus first-team players on the 1955 All-America college football team. Fullback Jerry Planutis was also selected as a first-teaam All-American by Jet magazine.

Eight Michigan State players were selected by the Associated Press (AP), United Press (UP), or International News Service (INS) on the 1955 All-Big Ten Conference football team: quarterback Morrall (AP-1, UP-1, INS-1); halfback Walt Kowalczyk (AP-2, UP-2); halfback Clarence Peaks (UP-3); fullback Planutis (AP-2, UP-1); end John Lewis (UP-3); tackle Masters (AP-1, UP-2, INS-1); guard Carl "Buck" Nystrom (AP-1, UP-2, INS-1); and center Joe Badaczewski (UP-3).

== Schedule ==
Date	Opponent	Rank	Site	Result	Attendance	Source
September 24	at Indiana		Memorial Stadium; Bloomington, IN (rivalry)	W 20–13	20,287	
October 1	at No. 2 Michigan		Michigan Stadium; Ann Arbor, MI (rivalry)	L 7–14	97,239	
October 8	No. 20 Stanford*		Macklin Stadium; East Lansing, MI	W 38–14	47,586	
October 15	No. 4 Notre Dame*	No. 13	Macklin Stadium; East Lansing, MI (rivalry)	W 21–7	52,007	
October 22	Illinois^{†}	No. 6	Macklin Stadium; East Lansing, MI	W 21–7	51,851	
October 29	at Wisconsin	No. 5	Camp Randall Stadium; Madison, WI	W 27–0	53,529	
November 5	at Purdue	No. 4	Ross–Ade Stadium; West Lafayette, IN	W 27–0	41,000	
November 12	Minnesota	No. 3	Macklin Stadium; East Lansing, MI	W 42–14	51,605	
November 19	Marquette*	No. 3	Macklin Stadium; East Lansing, MI	W 33–0	41,814	
January 2, 1956	vs. No. 4 UCLA*	No. 2	Rose Bowl; Pasadena, CA (Rose Bowl)	W 17–14	100,809	
*Non-conference game; ^{†}Homecoming; Rankings from AP Poll released prior to the game
