= 1955 Minnesota Golden Gophers football team =

American college football season

1955 Minnesota Golden Gophers football
- Conference: Big Ten Conference
- Record: 3–6 (2–5 Big Ten)
- Head coach: Murray Warmath (2nd season)
- MVP: Don Swanson
- Captain: Mike Falls
- Home stadium: Memorial Stadium

1955 Big Ten Conference football standings
	Conf.					Overall
Team	W		L		T	W		L		T
No. 5 Ohio State $	6	–	0	–	0	7	–	2	–	0
No. 2 Michigan State	5	–	1	–	0	9	–	1	–	0
No. 12 Michigan	5	–	2	–	0	7	–	2	–	0
Purdue	4	–	2	–	1	5	–	3	–	1
Illinois	3	–	3	–	1	5	–	3	–	1
Wisconsin	3	–	4	–	0	4	–	5	–	0
Iowa	2	–	3	–	1	3	–	5	–	1
Minnesota	2	–	5	–	0	3	–	6	–	0
Indiana	1	–	5	–	0	3	–	6	–	0
Northwestern	0	–	6	–	1	0	–	8	–	1
$ – Conference champion; Rankings from AP Poll

The 1955 Minnesota Golden Gophers football team represented the University of Minnesota in the 1955 Big Ten Conference football season. In their second year under head coach Murray Warmath, the Golden Gophers compiled a 3–6 record and were outscored by their opponents by a combined total of 172 to 110.

Quarterback Don Swanson received the team's Most Valuable Player award, and fullback Dick Borstad and running back Bob Hobart were named to the Academic All-Big Ten team.

Total attendance for the season was 305,581, which averaged to 61,116. The season high for attendance was against Southern Cal.

== Schedule ==
Date	Opponent	Site	Result	Attendance	Source
September 24	Washington*	Memorial Stadium; Minneapolis, MN	L 0–30	56,989	
October 1	Purdue	Memorial Stadium; Minneapolis, MN	L 6–7	59,019	
October 8	at Northwestern	Dyche Stadium; Evanston, IL	W 18–7	38,000	
October 15	at Illinois	Memorial Stadium; Champaign, IL	L 13–21	45,995	
October 22	No. 1 Michigan	Memorial Stadium; Minneapolis, MN (Little Brown Jug)	L 13–14	63,530	
October 29	No. 10 USC*^{†}	Memorial Stadium; Minneapolis, MN	W 25–19	64,047	
November 5	at Iowa	Iowa Stadium; Iowa City, IA (rivalry)	L 0–26	52,459	
November 12	at No. 3 Michigan State	Macklin Stadium; East Lansing, MI	L 14–42	51,605	
November 19	Wisconsin	Memorial Stadium; Minneapolis, MN (rivalry)	W 21–6	61,996	
*Non-conference game; ^{†}Homecoming; Rankings from AP Poll released prior to the game
