= 1955 Wisconsin Badgers football team =

American college football season

1955 Wisconsin Badgers football
- Conference: Big Ten Conference
- Record: 4–5 (3–4 Big Ten)
- Head coach: Ivy Williamson (7th season)
- MVP: Wells Gray
- Captain: Wells Gray
- Home stadium: Camp Randall Stadium

1955 Big Ten Conference football standings
	Conf.					Overall
Team	W		L		T	W		L		T
No. 5 Ohio State $	6	–	0	–	0	7	–	2	–	0
No. 2 Michigan State	5	–	1	–	0	9	–	1	–	0
No. 12 Michigan	5	–	2	–	0	7	–	2	–	0
Purdue	4	–	2	–	1	5	–	3	–	1
Illinois	3	–	3	–	1	5	–	3	–	1
Wisconsin	3	–	4	–	0	4	–	5	–	0
Iowa	2	–	3	–	1	3	–	5	–	1
Minnesota	2	–	5	–	0	3	–	6	–	0
Indiana	1	–	5	–	0	3	–	6	–	0
Northwestern	0	–	6	–	1	0	–	8	–	1
$ – Conference champion; Rankings from AP Poll

The 1955 Wisconsin Badgers football team represented the University of Wisconsin in the 1955 Big Ten Conference football season. Led by Ivy Williamson in his seventh and final season as head coach, the Badgers compiled an overall record of 4–5 with a mark of 3–4 in conference play, placing sixth in the Big Ten.

== Schedule ==
Date	Opponent	Rank	Site	Result	Attendance	Source
September 24	Marquette*		Camp Randall Stadium; Madison, WI	W 28–14	53,359	
October 1	No. 14 Iowa	No. 17	Camp Randall Stadium; Madison, WI (rivalry)	W 37–14	53,509	
October 8	at No. 17 Purdue	No. 9	Ross–Ade Stadium; West Lafayette, IN	W 9–0	45,000	
October 14	at No. 16 USC*	No. 6	Los Angeles Memorial Coliseum; Los Angeles, CA	L 21–33	75,162	
October 22	Ohio State	No. 15	Camp Randall Stadium; Madison, WI	L 16–26	53,539	
October 29	No. 5 Michigan State^{†}		Camp Randall Stadium; Madison, WI	L 0–27	53,529	
November 5	at Northwestern		Dyche Stadium; Evanston, IL	W 41–14	40,000	
November 12	No. 16 Illinois		Camp Randall Stadium; Madison, WI	L 14–17	53,529	
November 19	at Minnesota		Memorial Stadium; Minneapolis, MN (rivalry)	L 6–21	62,714	
*Non-conference game; ^{†}Homecoming; Rankings from AP Poll released prior to the game

== Team players in the 1956 NFL draft ==
Player	Position	Round	Pick	NFL club
John Dittrich	Tackle	6	70	Chicago Cardinals
Bob Konovsky	Tackle	7	77	Chicago Cardinals
Charlie Thomas	Back	14	164	Green Bay Packers
Wells Gray	Guard	16	190	Washington Redskins
Dick Kolian	End	27	320	Green Bay Packers
Jim Miller	Quarterback	28	330	Chicago Cardinals
