= Stu Holcomb =

American football coach

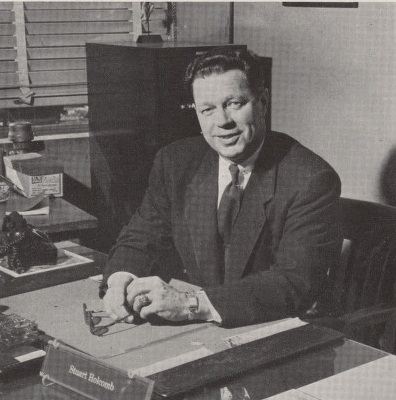
- Holcomb pictured in Debris 1954, Purdue yearbook

Biographical details
- Born: September 11, 1910; Erie, Pennsylvania, U.S.
- Died: January 11, 1977 (aged 66); Venice, Florida, U.S.

Playing career
- 1929–1931: Ohio State
- Position: Halfback

Coaching career (HC unless noted)

Football
- 1932–1935: Findlay
- 1936–1940: Muskingum
- 1941: Washington & Jefferson
- 1942–1943: Miami (OH)
- 1945–1946: Army (assistant)
- 1947–1955: Purdue

Basketball
- 1932–1936: Findlay
- 1936–1940: Muskingum
- 1945–1947: Army

Administrative career (AD unless noted)
- 1956–1966: Northwestern
- 1971–1973: Chicago White Sox (GM)

Head coaching record
- Overall: 93–75–12 (football); 54–40 (basketball)

Accomplishments and honors

Championships
- 1 OAC (1939); 1 Big Ten (1952)

Stuart K. Holcomb (September 11, 1910 – January 11, 1977) was an American football and basketball coach best known for serving as head football coach for Miami University (1942–1943) and Purdue University (1947–1955). Before coaching, Holcomb was a starting halfback at Ohio State University and the captain of the 1931 Buckeyes football team. Prior to arriving at Miami, Holcomb was the head football coach at three smaller schools: the University of Findlay (1932–1935), Muskingum College (1936–1940), and Washington & Jefferson College (1941). He also served as the head basketball coach at University of Findlay for four seasons, 1932–33 through 1935–36 and at the United States Military Academy from 1945 to 1947. After retiring from coaching, Holcomb was the athletic director at Northwestern University (1956–1966) and later the general manager of Major League Baseball's Chicago White Sox (1971–1973).

== Coaching career ==
=== Miami ===
Holcomb was named Miami University's head football coach for the 1942 season succeeding Frank Wilton. His first team went 3–6 which equaled the number of wins of the three previous years for the Redskins. The next year Holcomb and the Redskins posted a winning record of 7–2–1. This team was dominated by defense, only allowing their opponents to score in double digits twice; A 34–12 win over Bradley University and a 35–0 blow out loss to Arkansas A&M. In his two years as Miami's head coach he compiled an overall record of 10–9–1. He left Miami to become an assistant coach for Earl Blaik at the United States Military Academy. He was replaced as Redskins coach by future Pro and College Football Hall of Fame coach Sid Gillman who was one of Holcomb's top assistant coaches.

=== Army ===
While an assistant football coach for the United States Military Academy, Holcomb was head coach of the men's basketball team for two seasons from 1945 through 1947. He led the cadets to two straight winning seasons of 9–6 and 9–7.

=== Purdue ===
During Holcomb's tenure as Boilermakers head coach he compiled a record of 35–42–4. His best year was 1952 when he led the Boilermakers to a Big Ten Conference co-championship and a #18 ranking in the final poll. Despite having only a 4–3–2 overall record, Holcomb's team played well in conference with a 4–1–1 record. Holcomb's Purdue teams are, perhaps, best remembered for ending Notre Dame's 39-game unbeaten streak when his Boilermakers defeated the Irish, 28–14, in the second game of the 1950 season. Holcomb was known for developing solid quarterbacks including Bob DeMoss, Dale Samuels and Len Dawson. These players helped grow a strong tradition at Purdue of great quarterback play. On December 12, 1955, after his nine seasons at Purdue, Holcomb left Purdue to accept the athletic director position at the Northwestern University

== Sports administrator ==
Holcomb served as the athletic director at Northwestern from 1956 to 1966. He hired fellow Miami alum Ara Parseghian to be the new Wildcats head coach in 1956, and Parseghian stayed at Northwestern until accepting the head coaching job at Notre Dame following the 1963 season. One of the reasons for Parseghian's departure was his feud with Holcomb. He resigned from his Northwestern post on 1 December 1966.

Four months prior on 11 August 1966, Holcomb was appointed as the general manager of the Chicago Mustangs, a United Soccer Association franchise owned by Arthur and John Allyn. He was reassigned by the Allyn brothers to the Chicago White Sox as its public relations director on 11 October 1968, one month prior to the Mustangs withdrawing from the North American Soccer League (NASL).

With the White Sox's record at 49–87 and en route to a franchise-worst 56–106 finish, Holcomb was promoted to replace Ed Short as general manager on 1 September 1970. He immediately began overhauling the ball club that month with the dismissal of Don Gutteridge on the 2nd and the hiring of Chuck Tanner and Roland Hemond from the California Angels as manager and director of player personnel respectively two days later on the 4th. Holcomb resigned on 26 July 1973 as a result of disagreements with Tanner over the team's roster depth. He was succeeded by Hemond as general manager four days later on 30 July.

== Death ==
Holcomb died of a heart attack, on January 11, 1977, in Venice, Florida.

== Family ==
Holcomb's three sons played college football: Chip at Northwestern University, Doug at Purdue University, and Bryan at Arizona State University and Florida State University.

== Head coaching record ==
=== Football ===
Year	Team	Overall	Conference	Standing	Bowl/playoffs	Coaches^{#}	AP^{°}
Findlay Oilers (Independent) (1932–1935)
1932	Findlay	3–2–2					
1933	Findlay	5–2					
1934	Findlay	3–3					
1935	Findlay	4–4					
Findlay:		15–11–2					
Muskingum Fighting Muskies (Ohio Athletic Conference) (1936–1940)
1936	Muskingum	6–3	6–2	6th			
1937	Muskingum	4–3–2	3–3–2	T–7th			
1938	Muskingum	5–3–2	4–2–1	T–6th			
1939	Muskingum	8–1	7–0	1st			
1940	Muskingum	5–2–1	3–2	T–6th			
Muskingum:		28–12–4	23–9–3				
Washington & Jefferson Presidents (Independent) (1941)
1941	Washington & Jefferson	5–1–1					
Washington & Jefferson:		5–1–1					
Miami Redskins (independent) (1942–1943)
1942	Miami	3–6					
1943	Miami	7–2–1					
Miami:		10–8–1					
Purdue Boilermakers (Big Ten Conference) (1947–1955)
1947	Purdue	5–4	3–3	T–3rd			
1948	Purdue	3–6	2–4	T–5th			
1949	Purdue	4–5	2–4	8th			
1950	Purdue	2–7	1–4	T–8th			
1951	Purdue	5–4	4–1	2nd		14	
1952	Purdue	4–3–2	4–1–1	T–1st		12	18
1953	Purdue	2–7	2–4	8th			
1954	Purdue	5–3–1	3–3	6th			
1955	Purdue	5–3–1	4–2	4th			
Purdue:		35–42–4	25–23–1				
Total:		93–75–12					
National championship Conference title Conference division title or championship game berth
^{#}Rankings from final Coaches Poll.; ^{°}Rankings from final AP Poll.
