= 1955 Indiana Hoosiers football team =

American college football season

1955 Indiana Hoosiers football
- Conference: Big Ten Conference
- Record: 3–6 (1–5 Big Ten)
- Head coach: Bernie Crimmins (4th season)
- MVP: Bob Skoronski
- Captain: John Bartkiewicz
- Home stadium: Memorial Stadium

1955 Big Ten Conference football standings
	Conf.					Overall
Team	W		L		T	W		L		T
No. 5 Ohio State $	6	–	0	–	0	7	–	2	–	0
No. 2 Michigan State	5	–	1	–	0	9	–	1	–	0
No. 12 Michigan	5	–	2	–	0	7	–	2	–	0
Purdue	4	–	2	–	1	5	–	3	–	1
Illinois	3	–	3	–	1	5	–	3	–	1
Wisconsin	3	–	4	–	0	4	–	5	–	0
Iowa	2	–	3	–	1	3	–	5	–	1
Minnesota	2	–	5	–	0	3	–	6	–	0
Indiana	1	–	5	–	0	3	–	6	–	0
Northwestern	0	–	6	–	1	0	–	8	–	1
$ – Conference champion; Rankings from AP Poll

The 1955 Indiana Hoosiers football team represented the Indiana Hoosiers in the 1955 Big Ten Conference football season. The Hoosiers played their home games at Memorial Stadium in Bloomington, Indiana. The team was coached by Bernie Crimmins, in his fourth year as head coach of the Hoosiers.

== Schedule ==
Date	Opponent	Site	Result	Attendance	Source
September 24	Michigan State	Memorial Stadium; Bloomington, IN (rivalry)	L 13–20	20,287	
October 1	at No. 4 Notre Dame*	Notre Dame Stadium; Notre Dame, IN	L 0–19	56,494	
October 8	at Iowa	Iowa Stadium; Iowa City, IA	L 6–20	51,576	
October 15	Villanova*	Memorial Stadium; Bloomington, IN	W 14–7	24,242–25,000	
October 22	at Northwestern	Dyche Stadium; Evanston, IL	W 20–14	29,700	
October 29	Ohio*	Memorial Stadium; Bloomington, IN	W 21–14	18,108	
November 5	at No. 11 Ohio State	Ohio Stadium; Columbus, OH	L 13–20	80,730	
November 12	at No. 7 Michigan	Michigan Stadium; Ann Arbor, MI	L 0–30	60,613	
November 19	Purdue	Memorial Stadium; Bloomington, IN (Old Oaken Bucket)	L 4–6	30,945–35,000	
*Non-conference game; Rankings from AP Poll released prior to the game

== 1956 NFL draftees ==
Player	Position	Round	Pick	NFL club
Bob Skoronski	Tackle	5	56	Green Bay Packers
