= Bob Skoronski =

American football player (1934–2018)

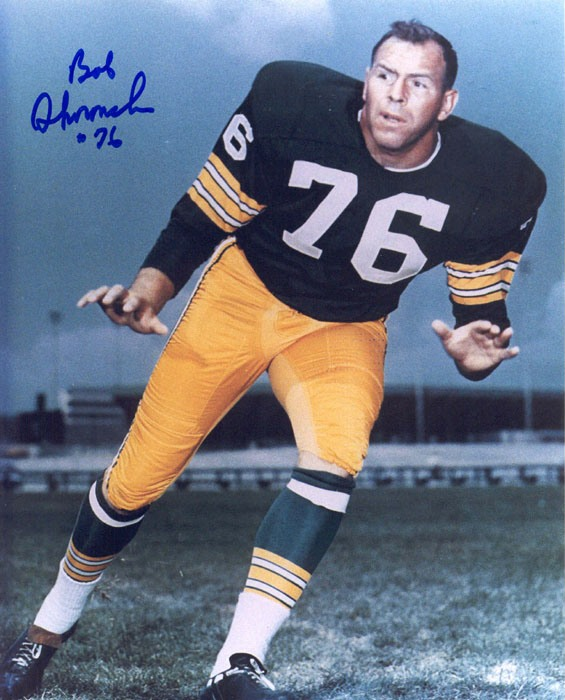

No. 76
- Positions: Tackle, center

Personal information
- Born: March 5, 1934; Ansonia, Connecticut, U.S.
- Died: October 30, 2018 (aged 84); Middleton, Wisconsin, U.S.
- Listed height: 6 ft 3 in (1.91 m)
- Listed weight: 249 lb (113 kg)

Career information
- High school: Derby (Derby, Connecticut); Fairfield Prep (Fairfield, Connecticut)
- College: Indiana
- NFL draft: 1956: 5th round, 56th overall pick

Career history
- Green Bay Packers (1956, 1959–1968)

Awards and highlights
- 5× NFL champion (1961, 1962, 1965, 1966, 1967); 2× Super Bowl champion (I, II); Pro Bowl (1966); Green Bay Packers Hall of Fame

Career NFL statistics
- Games played: 146
- Games started: 124
- Fumble recoveries: 1
- Stats at Pro Football Reference

Robert Francis Skoronski (March 5, 1934 – October 30, 2018) was an American professional football player who was a tackle in the National Football League (NFL) for the Green Bay Packers for 11 seasons. He played college football for the Indiana Hoosiers.

== Early life ==
Born in Ansonia, Connecticut, Skoronski grew up in Derby with three brothers and a sister. He went to high school at Fairfield College Preparatory School, graduating in 1951. He then attended Admiral Billard Academy in New London for a year. He played college football at Indiana University in Bloomington. As a senior in 1955, he was the Hoosiers' most valuable player and averaged 50 minutes per game.

== Playing career ==
Skoronski was selected in the fifth round of the 1956 NFL draft, 56th overall, by the Green Bay Packers. He started at left tackle in his rookie season in 1956 under third-year head coach Lisle Blackbourn, and then served two years in the U.S. Air Force. Skoronski returned to the team in 1959, the first season under head coach Vince Lombardi.

Skoronski was the offensive left tackle and offensive captain on Lombardi's five NFL championship teams. He played in the Pro Bowl following the 1966 season (and the first Super Bowl).

Following his 11th season in the NFL, Skoronski retired in June 1969, and was elected to the Packers Hall of Fame in 1976. In 2017, the Professional Football Researchers Association named Skoronski to the PFRA Hall of Very Good Class of 2017.

== Personal life ==
Skoronski met his wife Ruth in college and they married in 1956. They had four children, three boys and a girl (Bob, Steve, Ron and Patti), and four grandchildren.

He died of Alzheimer's disease on October 30, 2018, in Middleton, Wisconsin.

His grandson, Peter Skoronski, played offensive tackle at Northwestern University and was picked by the Tennessee Titans 11th overall in the first round of the 2023 NFL draft.
