= 1955 Iowa Hawkeyes football team =

American college football season

1955 Iowa Hawkeyes football
- Iowa's "Steubenville Trio": halfback Eddie Vincent (left), guard Cal Jones (center), and end Frank Gilliam (right)
- Conference: Big Ten Conference

Ranking
- Coaches: No. 19
- Record: 3–5–1 (2–3–1 Big Ten)
- Head coach: Forest Evashevski (4th season)
- MVP: Jerry Reichow
- Captain: Cal Jones
- Home stadium: Iowa Stadium

1955 Big Ten Conference football standings
	Conf.					Overall
Team	W		L		T	W		L		T
No. 5 Ohio State $	6	–	0	–	0	7	–	2	–	0
No. 2 Michigan State	5	–	1	–	0	9	–	1	–	0
No. 12 Michigan	5	–	2	–	0	7	–	2	–	0
Purdue	4	–	2	–	1	5	–	3	–	1
Illinois	3	–	3	–	1	5	–	3	–	1
Wisconsin	3	–	4	–	0	4	–	5	–	0
Iowa	2	–	3	–	1	3	–	5	–	1
Minnesota	2	–	5	–	0	3	–	6	–	0
Indiana	1	–	5	–	0	3	–	6	–	0
Northwestern	0	–	6	–	1	0	–	8	–	1
$ – Conference champion; Rankings from AP Poll

The 1955 Iowa Hawkeyes football team was an American football team that represented the University of Iowa as a member of the Big Ten Conference during the 1955 Big Ten football season. In their fourth season under head coach Forest Evashevski, the Hawkeyes compiled a 3–5–1 record (2–3–1 in conference games), finished in seventh place in the Big Ten, and were outscored by a total of 173 to 166. They were ranked No. 19 in the final UPI poll.

The 1955 Hawkeyes gained 1,937 rushing yards and 942 passing yards. On defense, they gave up 1,479 rushing yards and 975 passing yards. Iowa's 362 rushing attempts in 1955 remains the school record. Iowa broke the school's single-game total defense record by holding Kansas State to 67 yards; that mark remains the second lowest in Iowa history. The team also held two opponents (Kansas State and Ohio State) to zero passing yards.

The team's statistical leaders included Eddie Vincent (381 rushing yards, 30 points scored); Jerry Reichow (48-of-88 passing for 722 yards); and Jim Gibbons (16 receptions for 257 yards). Reichow was selected as the team's most valuable player. Guard Cal Jones won the Outland Trophy as the nation's top interior lineman and was a consensus All-American for the second consecutive year.

The team played its home games at Iowa Stadium in Iowa City, Iowa. Home attendance was 201,072, an average of 50,268 per game. It was the first time Iowa drew an average of over 50,000 spectators to its home games.

== Schedule ==
Date	Opponent	Rank	Site	TV	Result	Attendance	Source
September 24	Kansas State*		Iowa Stadium; Iowa City, IA		W 28–7	44,500	
October 1	at No. 17 Wisconsin	No. 14	Camp Randall Stadium; Madison, WI (rivalry)		L 14–37	53,509	
October 8	Indiana		Iowa Stadium; Iowa City, IA		W 20–6	51,576	
October 15	Purdue^{†}		Iowa Stadium; Iowa City, IA		T 20–20	52,137	
October 21	at No. 7 UCLA*		Los Angeles Memorial Coliseum; Los Angeles, CA		L 13–33	75,692	
October 29	at Michigan		Michigan Stadium; Ann Arbor, MI	NBC	L 21–33	73,275	
November 5	Minnesota		Iowa Stadium; Iowa City, IA (rivalry)	CBS	W 26–0	52,459	
November 12	at Ohio State		Ohio Stadium; Columbus, OH		L 10–20	82,701	
November 19	at Notre Dame*		Notre Dame Stadium; Notre Dame, IN		L 14–17	59,955	
*Non-conference game; ^{†}Homecoming; Rankings from AP Poll released prior to the game

== Personnel ==
=== Players ===
The following players received varsity letters for their performance on the 1955 Iowa football team:

- Frank Bloomquist, guard/tackle, sophomore, 6-2, 205 pounds, Waterloo, IA
- Don Bowen, tackle, sophomore, 6-3, 205 pounds, East St. Louis, IL
- John Burroughs, guard/tackle, sophomore, 6-4, 226 pounds, Washington, DC
- Richard Deasy, tackle/guard, junior, 6-0, 208 pounds, Chicago
- Don Dobrino, quarterback, junior, 6-2, 200 pounds, Mount Olive, IL
- Jim Freeman, end, senior, 6-4, 234 pounds, Iowa City, IA
- Jim Gibbons, end, sophomore, No. 88, 6-3, 204 pounds, Chicago
- Frank Gilliam, end, senior, No. 37, 6-2, 183 pounds, Steubenville, OH
- Collins "Mike" Hagler, halfback, sophomore, 5-9, 168 pounds, Washington, DC
- Bill Happel, back, 170 pounds
- Fred Harris, fullback, sophomore, 6-1, 203 pounds, Bannockburn, IL
- Toni Hatch, end, junior, 6-1, 190 pounds, Lancaster, WI
- Ken Jehle, tackle, senior, 6-1, 207 pounds, West Liberty, IA
- Cal Jones, guard, senior, No. 62, 6-0, 220 pounds, Steubenville, OH
- Eldan Kanellis, fullback, senior, 6-0, 190 pounds, Cedar Rapids, IA
- Alex Karras, tackle/guard, sophomore, No. 77, 6-2, 235 pounds, Gary, IN
- George Kress, guard, sophomore, 6-2, 230 pounds, Dubuque, IA
- Eldean Matheson, halfback, senior, 6-0, 170 pounds, Lake Mills, IA
- Ken Ploen, quarterback/halfback, junior, 6-2, 175 pounds, Clinton, IA
- Bill Reichow, tackle, junior, 6-2, 210 pounds, Decorah, IA
- Jerry Reichow, quarterback, senior, No. 25, 6-2, 200 pounds, Decorah, IA
- Frank Rigney, end, sophomore, 6-4, 219 pounds, East St. Louis, IL
- Terry Shuck, tackle, senior, 6-2, 198 pounds, Des Moines, IA
- Norman Six, center, senior, 6-2, 200 pounds, North Cumberland, WV
- Earl Smith, halfback, senior, 5-11, 171 pounds, Gary, IN
- Don Suchy, center, junior, 6-0, 210 pounds, Belle Plaine, IA
- Rodger Swedberg, tackle, senior, 6-1, 215 pounds, Sycamore, IL
- Duane Tofson, quarterback, senior, 5-11, 185 pounds, Wisconsin Dells, WI
- Bill Van Buren, center, sophomore, 6-0, 205 pounds, Lorain, OH
- Eddie Vincent, halfback, senior, No. 41, 5-11, 175 pounds, Steubenville, OH
- Roger Wiegmann, fullback, senior, 6-2, 190 pounds, Waverly, IA

=== Coaches ===
- Head coach - Forest Evashevski
- Assistant coaches - Bump Elliott, Whitey Piro

== Awards and honors ==
Guard Cal Jones was the team captain. He won the Outland Trophy as the nation's top interior lineman. He was also a consensus All-American for the second consecutive year. Jones was later inducted into the College Football Hall of Fame.

Quarterback Jerry Reichow was selected as the team's most valuable player.

Three Iowa players received honors on the 1955 All-Big Ten Conference football team: Jones (AP-1, UP-1, INS-1); halfback Eddie Vincent (UP-2, INS-1); and quarterback Jerry Reichow (UP-3).

Three players on the 1955 team were later inducted into the Iowa Letterwinners Club Hall of Fame: Cal Jones; end Jim Gibbons; and quarterback Ken Ploen.

== In popular culture ==
The November 12 game against Ohio State was mentioned in the movie Back to the Future Part II. A radio announcer telling the scores of the day's games mentions that Ohio State beat Iowa 20–10.

== 1956 NFL draft ==
Player	Position	Round	Pick	NFL club
Jerry Reichow	Quarterback	4	38	Detroit Lions
Jim Freeman	End	5	50	Los Angeles Rams
Eddie Vincent	Back	6	72	Los Angeles Rams
Cal Jones	Guard	9	98	Detroit Lions
Roger Swedberg	Tackle	12	136	San Francisco 49ers
