= Winning isn't everything; it's the only thing =

Quotation in sports

"Winning isn’t everything; it's the only thing" is a well-known quotation in sports. It is attributed to UCLA Bruins football coach Red Sanders. He is on record with at least two different versions of the quotation during his coaching career. Sanders is reputed to have used this quote even as far back as the 1930s.

== Red Sanders ==
In 1950, at a Cal Poly San Luis Obispo physical education workshop, Sanders told his group: "Men, I'll be honest. Winning isn't everything", then following a long pause, "Men, it's the only thing!" In a three-part article, December 7, 1953, on Red Sanders, by Bud Furillo of the Los Angeles Herald and Express, the phrase is quoted in the sub head. Furillo said in his unpublished memoirs Sanders first made the statement to him after UCLA's loss to USC in 1949. In 1955, in a Sports Illustrated article preceding the 1956 Rose Bowl, he was quoted as saying "Sure, winning isn't every thing; it's the only thing."

While at UCLA, another famous quote was attributed to Sanders regarding the UCLA–USC rivalry, "Beating 'SC is not a matter of life or death, it's more important than that." A form of this quote was later widely attributed to Bill Shankly, Liverpool FC coach from a 1981 television interview.

== Others ==
The phrase is quoted in the 1953 film Trouble Along the Way by Sherry Jackson's character, Carol Williams. Screenwriter Melville Shavelson heard it from his agent, who also happened to represent Red Sanders, which is how it got into the script. The quotation is widely, but wrongly attributed to American football coach Vince Lombardi, who probably heard the phrase from UCLA coach Sanders. Lombardi is on record using the quotation as early as 1959 in his opening talk on the first day of the Packers’ training camp. The quotation captured the American public's attention during Lombardi's highly successful reign as coach of the Packers in the 1960s. Over time, the quotation took on a life of its own. The words graced the walls of locker rooms, ignited pre-game pep talks, and even into the Richard Nixon campaign. According to the late James Michener's Sports in America, Lombardi claimed to have been misquoted. What he intended to say was "Winning isn't everything. The will to win is the only thing." However, Lombardi is on record repeating the original version of the quotation on several occasions.

== Other related quotations ==
This credo has served as counterpoint to the well known sentiment by sports journalist Grantland Rice that, "it's not that you won or lost but how you played the game", and to the modern Olympic creed expressed by its founder Pierre de Coubertin: "The most important thing. . . is not winning but taking part".
