= 1955 Northwestern Wildcats football team =

American college football season

1955 Northwestern Wildcats football
- Conference: Big Ten Conference
- Record: 0–8–1 (0–6–1 Big Ten)
- Head coach: Lou Saban (1st season)
- MVP: Kurt Krueger
- Captain: Sandy Sacks
- Home stadium: Dyche Stadium

1955 Big Ten Conference football standings
| | Conf. | | | | | Overall |
| Team | W | | L | | T | W | | L | | T |
|---|---|---|---|---|---|---|---|---|---|---|
| No. 5 Ohio State $ | 6 | – | 0 | – | 0 | 7 | – | 2 | – | 0 |
| No. 2 Michigan State | 5 | – | 1 | – | 0 | 9 | – | 1 | – | 0 |
| No. 12 Michigan | 5 | – | 2 | – | 0 | 7 | – | 2 | – | 0 |
| Purdue | 4 | – | 2 | – | 1 | 5 | – | 3 | – | 1 |
| Illinois | 3 | – | 3 | – | 1 | 5 | – | 3 | – | 1 |
| Wisconsin | 3 | – | 4 | – | 0 | 4 | – | 5 | – | 0 |
| Iowa | 2 | – | 3 | – | 1 | 3 | – | 5 | – | 1 |
| Minnesota | 2 | – | 5 | – | 0 | 3 | – | 6 | – | 0 |
| Indiana | 1 | – | 5 | – | 0 | 3 | – | 6 | – | 0 |
| Northwestern | 0 | – | 6 | – | 1 | 0 | – | 8 | – | 1 |
$ – Conference champion; Rankings from AP Poll

The 1955 Northwestern Wildcats team represented Northwestern University during the 1955 Big Ten Conference football season. In their first year under head coach Lou Saban, the Wildcats compiled a 0–8–1 record (0–6–1 against Big Ten Conference opponents), finished in last place in the Big Ten, and were outscored by their opponents by a combined total of 241 to 66.

George Steinbrenner was an assistant coach in 1955.

== Schedule ==
| Date | Opponent | Site | Result | Attendance | Source |
|---|---|---|---|---|---|
| September 24 | Miami (OH)* | Dyche Stadium; Evanston, IL | L 14–25 | 35,000 | |
| October 1 | at Tulane* | Tulane Stadium; New Orleans, LA | L 0–21 | 20,000 | |
| October 8 | Minnesota | Dyche Stadium; Evanston, IL | L 7–18 | 38,000 | |
| October 15 | at No. 1 Michigan | Michigan Stadium; Ann Arbor, MI (rivalry) | L 2–14 | 67,074 | |
| October 22 | Indiana | Dyche Stadium; Evanston, IL | L 14–20 | 29,700 | |
| October 29 | at No. 15 Ohio State | Ohio Stadium; Columbus, OH | L 0–49 | 82,214 | |
| November 5 | Wisconsin | Dyche Stadium; Evanston, IL | L 14–41 | 40,000 | |
| November 12 | at Purdue | Ross–Ade Stadium; West Lafayette, IN | L 8–46 | 27,000 | |
| November 19 | Illinois | Dyche Stadium; Evanston, IL (rivalry) | T 7–7 | 35,000 | |
*Non-conference game; Rankings from AP Poll released prior to the game
