= Em Lindbeck =

American baseball player (1934–2008)

- Outfielder
- Born: August 27, 1934; Kewanee, Illinois, U.S.
- Died: August 27, 2008 (aged 74); Kewanee, Illinois, U.S.
- Batted: Left Threw: Right

MLB debut
- April 22, 1960, for the Detroit Tigers

Last MLB appearance
- May 1, 1960, for the Detroit Tigers

MLB statistics
- Batting average: .000
- Games played: 2
- Plate appearances: 2
- Stats at Baseball Reference

Teams
- Detroit Tigers (1960)

Emerit Desmond Lindbeck Jr. (August 27, 1934 – August 27, 2008) was an American professional baseball outfielder whose seven-year career included two appearances as a pinch hitter for the 1960 Detroit Tigers of Major League Baseball. Lindbeck was a native of Kewanee, Illinois; he batted left-handed, threw right-handed, and was listed as 6 feet (1.8 m) tall and 185 pounds (84 kg).

Lindbeck signed with the Milwaukee Braves in 1956 after graduating from the University of Illinois at Urbana–Champaign, where—in addition to starring in baseball—he was the starting quarterback for the 1954 and 1955 Illinois Fighting Illini football team. He spent four seasons in the Milwaukee farm system before the Tigers chose him in the 1959 Rule 5 draft. He began 1960 on the Tigers' 28-man roster, but appeared in only two games. On April 22, he pinch-hit for pitcher Dave Sisler and drew a base on balls against Bob Shaw of the Chicago White Sox. Nine days later, on May 1, also against the White Sox, he batted for Ray Semproch and grounded out against Gerry Staley. When rosters were reduced to 25 men in mid-May, the Tigers offered Lindbeck back to the Braves' organization, but he temporarily refused an assignment to the Braves' Double-A Austin affiliate, and did not report to the Milwaukee organization until 1961.

Lindbeck played two more seasons of minor league baseball before leaving the professional ranks in 1962. He returned to Kewanee, where he became a teacher, school administrator and coach; later he served as mayor of Kewanee. However, he was charged with and convicted of voter fraud in 1989, ending his teaching and political careers. He died in his hometown on his 74th birthday in 2008.
