= 1955 Ohio State Buckeyes football team =

American college football season

1955 Ohio State Buckeyes football
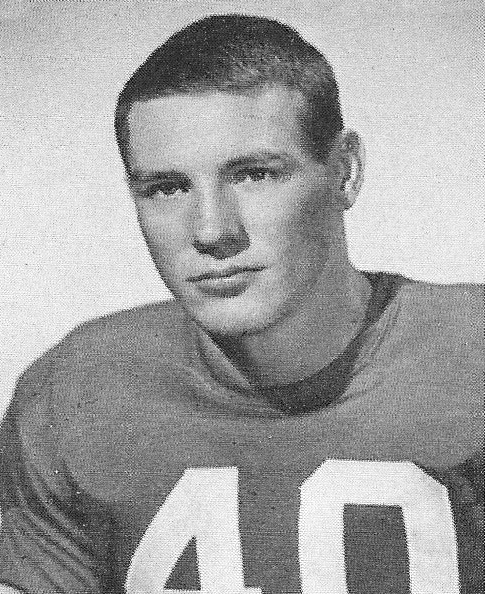
- Howard "Hopalong" Cassady

Big Ten champion
- Conference: Big Ten Conference

Ranking
- Coaches: No. 5
- AP: No. 5
- Record: 7–2 (6–0 Big Ten)
- Head coach: Woody Hayes (5th season)
- MVP: Howard Cassady
- Captains: Fran Machinsky; Ken Vargo
- Home stadium: Ohio Stadium

1955 Big Ten Conference football standings
	Conf.					Overall
Team	W		L		T	W		L		T
No. 5 Ohio State $	6	–	0	–	0	7	–	2	–	0
No. 2 Michigan State	5	–	1	–	0	9	–	1	–	0
No. 12 Michigan	5	–	2	–	0	7	–	2	–	0
Purdue	4	–	2	–	1	5	–	3	–	1
Illinois	3	–	3	–	1	5	–	3	–	1
Wisconsin	3	–	4	–	0	4	–	5	–	0
Iowa	2	–	3	–	1	3	–	5	–	1
Minnesota	2	–	5	–	0	3	–	6	–	0
Indiana	1	–	5	–	0	3	–	6	–	0
Northwestern	0	–	6	–	1	0	–	8	–	1
$ – Conference champion; Rankings from AP Poll

The 1955 Ohio State Buckeyes football team was an American football team that represented the Ohio State University as a member of the Big Ten Conference during the 1955 Big Ten season. In their fifth year under head coach Woody Hayes, the Buckeyes compiled a 7–2 record (6–0 in conference games), won the Big Ten championship, and outscored opponents by a total of 201 to 97. In games against ranked opponents, they lost to No. 11 Duke (14-20) and defeated No. 15 Wisconsin (26-16), No 20 Iowa (20-10), and No. 6 Michigan (17–0). They were ranked No. 5 in the final AP poll.

Halfback Howard "Hopalong" Cassady led the team with 958 rushing yards (6.0 yards per carry) and 14 touchdowns. He won the Heisman Trophy, the Maxwell Award, and the Chicago Tribune Silver Football. Cassady was also a consensus All-American. Guard Jim Parker also received first-team All-America honors from the Football Writers Association of America (FWAA), Central Press (CP), and Jet magazine. Cassady and Parker were both later inducted into the College Football Hall of Fame. Quarterback Frank Ellwood led the team in passing with only nine completed passes for 60 passing yards.

Four Ohio State players received first team honors on the 1955 All-Big Ten Conference football team: Cassady (AP-1, UP-1, INS-1); Parker (AP-1, UP-1); center Ken Vargo (AP-1, UP-1, INS-1); and lineman Francis Machinsky (AP-2, UP-1).

The team played its home games at Ohio Stadium in Columbus, Ohio

== Schedule ==
Date	Opponent	Rank	Site	Result	Attendance	Source
September 24	Nebraska*	No. 6	Ohio Stadium; Columbus, OH	W 28–20	80,171	
October 1	at Stanford*	No. 8	Stanford Stadium; Stanford, CA	L 0–6	28,000	
October 8	Illinois		Ohio Stadium; Columbus, OH (Illibuck)	W 27–12	82,407	
October 15	No. 11 Duke*	No. 14	Ohio Stadium; Columbus, OH	L 14–20	82,254	
October 22	at No. 15 Wisconsin		Camp Randall Stadium; Madison, WI	W 26–16	53,529	
October 29	Northwestern	No. 15	Ohio Stadium; Columbus, OH	W 49–0	82,214	
November 5	Indiana	No. 11	Ohio Stadium; Columbus, OH	W 20–13	80,730	
November 12	No. 20 Iowa	No. 10	Ohio Stadium; Columbus, OH	W 20–10	82,701	
November 19	at No. 6 Michigan	No. 9	Michigan Stadium; Ann Arbor, MI (rivalry)	W 17–0	97,369	
*Non-conference game; Rankings from AP Poll released prior to the game

== Game summaries ==
=== Nebraska ===
Team Statistics
Statistic	Ohio State	Nebraska
Pass Atts.	3	26
Pass Comps.	1	11
Pass Yards	17	189
Yds./Pass	17.0	17.2
Rush Atts.	61	36
Rush Yards	321	138
Yds./Rush	5.3	3.8
Total Yards	338	327
Fumbles Lost	1	3
Interceptions	0	1
Total Turnovers	1	4

Team	1	2	3	4	Total
Nebraska	6	7	7	0	20
• Ohio State	7	7	14	0	28

- Date: September 24
- Location: Ohio Stadium
- Game attendance: 80,171
- Game weather: 72 °F (22 °C)

Scoring summary
Q1	OSU	Cassady 14 yard rush (Kriss kick)	OSU 7–0
Q1	NEB	Erway 9 yard rush (Erway kick failed)	OSU 7–6
Q2	OSU	Cassady 10 yard rush (Kriss kick)	OSU 14–6
Q2	NEB	Edwards 87 yard int. return (Erway kick)	OSU 14–13
Q3	OSU	Cassady 1 yard rush (Kriss kick)	OSU 21–13
Q3	NEB	Williams 11 yard pass from Erway (Plum kick)	OSU 21–20
Q3	OSU	Ellwood 1 yard rush (Kriss kick)	OSU 28–20

=== Stanford ===
Team Statistics
Statistic	Stanford	Ohio State
Pass Atts.	13	12
Pass Comps.	6	5
Pass Yards	66	41
Yds./Pass	11.0	8.2
Rush Atts.	41	57
Rush Yards	152	187
Yds./Rush	3.7	3.3
Total Yards	218	228
Fumbles Lost	1	1
Interceptions	0	1
Total Turnovers	1	2

Team	1	2	3	4	Total
Ohio State	0	0	0	0	0
• Stanford	6	0	0	0	6

- Date: October 1
- Location: Stanford Stadium
- Game attendance: 28,000
- Game weather: Fair

Scoring summary
Q4	STAN	Cameka 1 yard pass from Gustafson (Raftery kick failed)	STAN 6–0

=== Illinois ===
Team Statistics
Statistic	Ohio State	Illinois
Pass Atts.	9	15
Pass Comps.	4	7
Pass Yards	17	175
Yds./Pass	4.3	25.0
Rush Atts.	55	51
Rush Yards	334	196
Yds./Rush	6.1	3.8
Total Yards	351	371
Fumbles Lost	0	2
Interceptions	0	1
Total Turnovers	0	3

Team	1	2	3	4	Total
Illinois	6	0	0	6	12
• Ohio State	13	0	7	7	27

- Date: October 8
- Location: Ohio Stadium
- Game attendance: 82,407
- Game weather: 65 °F (18 °C)

Scoring summary
Q1	ILL	Lindbeck 1 yard rush (kick failed)	ILL 0–6
Q1	OSU	Cassady 18 yard rush (Kriss kick failed)	tie 6–6
Q1	OSU	Michael 15 yard pass from Ellwood (Kriss kick)	OSU 13–6
Q3	OSU	Ellwood 3 yard rush (Kriss kick)	OSU 20–6
Q4	OSU	Cassady 4 yard rush (Kriss kick)	OSU 27–6
Q4	ILL	Stout 1 yard run (kick failed)	OSU 27–12

=== Duke ===
Team Statistics
Statistic	Ohio State	Duke
Pass Atts.	10	13
Pass Comps.	2	9
Pass Yards	27	125
Yds./Pass	13.5	13.9
Rush Atts.	34	65
Rush Yards	138	218
Yds./Rush	4.1	3.4
Total Yards	165	343
Fumbles Lost	4	3
Interceptions	2	1
Total Turnovers	6	4

Team	1	2	3	4	Total
• Duke	0	7	7	6	20
Ohio State	7	7	0	0	14

- Location: Ohio Stadium
- Elapsed time: October 15
- Game attendance: 82,254
- Game weather: 68 °F (20 °C)

Scoring summary
Q1	OSU	Roseboro 45 yard rush (Kriss kick)	OSU 7–0
Q2	DUKE	Blaney 5 yard pass from Pascal (Nelson kick)	tie 7–7
Q2	OSU	Cassady 38 yard punt return (Kriss kick)	OSU 14–7
Q3	DUKE	Pascal 1 yard rush (Nelson kick)	tie 14–14
Q4	DUKE	Jurgenson 1 yard run (kick failed)	DUKE 14–20

=== Wisconsin ===
Team Statistics
Statistic	Wisconsin	Ohio State
Pass Atts.	18	4
Pass Comps.	7	2
Pass Yards	94	32
Yds./Pass	13.4	16.0
Rush Atts.	50	59
Rush Yards	284	272
Yds./Rush	5.7	4.6
Total Yards	378	304
Fumbles Lost	2	1
Interceptions	1	0
Total Turnovers	3	1

Team	1	2	3	4	Total
• Ohio State	0	12	0	14	26
Wisconsin	0	14	0	2	16

- Date: October 22
- Location: Camp Randall Stadium
- Game attendance: 53,529
- Game weather: 56 °F (13 °C), Partly Cloudy

Scoring summary
Q2	WISC	Levenhagen 4 yard rush (Peters kick)	WISC 0–7
Q2	WISC	Thomas 2 yard rush (Shwaiko kick)	WISC 0–14
Q2	OSU	Ellwood 1 yard rush (Kriss kick failed)	WISC 6–14
Q2	OSU	Ellwood 3 yard rush (Kriss kick failed)	WISC 12–14
Q4	OSU	Ellwood 1 yard rush (Cannavino kick)	OSU 19–14
Q4	OSU	Cassady 13 yard rush (Kriss kick)	OSU 26–14
Q4	WISC	Safety	OSU 26–16

=== Northwestern ===
Team Statistics
Statistic	Ohio State	Northwestern
Pass Atts.	5	19
Pass Comps.	2	8
Pass Yards	24	75
Yds./Pass	12.0	9.4
Rush Atts.	65	46
Rush Yards	395	166
Yds./Rush	6.1	3.6
Total Yards	419	241
Fumbles Lost	0	1
Interceptions	0	5
Total Turnovers	0	6

Team	1	2	3	4	Total
Northwestern	0	0	0	0	0
• Ohio State	14	14	7	14	49

- Date: October 29
- Location: Ohio Stadium
- Game attendance: 82,214
- Game weather: 52 °F (11 °C), Windy

Scoring summary
Q1	OSU	Cassady 30 yard rush (Kriss kick)	OSU 7–0
Q1	OSU	Roseboro 1 yard rush (Kriss kick)	OSU 14–0
Q2	OSU	Parker 42 yard fumble return (Kriss kick)	OSU 21–0
Q2	OSU	Cassady 3 yard rush (Kriss kick)	OSU 28–0
Q3	OSU	Brown 2 yard pass from Ellwood (Kriss kick)	OSU 35–0
Q4	OSU	Cannavino 4 yard rush (Kriss kick)	OSU 42–0
Q4	OSU	Williams 5 yard run (Sutherin kick)	OSU 49–0

=== Indiana ===
Team Statistics
Statistic	Ohio State	Indiana
Pass Atts.	2	18
Pass Comps.	0	11
Pass Yards	0	142
Yds./Pass	0.0	12.9
Rush Atts.	52	47
Rush Yards	251	159
Yds./Rush	4.8	3.4
Total Yards	251	301
Fumbles Lost	2	1
Interceptions	0	0
Total Turnovers	2	1

Team	1	2	3	4	Total
Indiana	0	6	0	7	13
• Ohio State	0	14	0	6	20

- Date: November 5
- Location: Ohio Stadium
- Game attendance: 80,730
- Game weather: 47 °F (8 °C), Clear

Scoring summary
Q2	OSU	Cassady 1 yard rush (Kriss kick)	OSU 7–0
Q2	IU	Campbell 1 yard rush (Hall kick failed)	OSU 7–6
Q2	OSU	Cassady 2 yard rush (Kriss kick)	OSU 14–6
Q4	OSU	Harkrader 3 yard rush (Kriss kick failed)	OSU 20–7
Q4	IU	Bomba 4 yard pass from Cichowski (Hall kick)	OSU 20–14

=== Iowa ===
Team Statistics
Statistic	Ohio State	Iowa
Pass Atts.	3	14
Pass Comps.	0	9
Pass Yards	0	101
Yds./Pass	0.0	11.2
Rush Atts.	53	45
Rush Yards	274	171
Yds./Rush	5.2	3.8
Total Yards	273	272
Fumbles Lost	0	1
Interceptions	0	1
Total Turnovers	0	2

Team	1	2	3	4	Total
Iowa	3	7	0	0	10
• Ohio State	7	6	0	7	20

- Date: November 12
- Location: Ohio Stadium
- Game attendance: 82,701
- Game weather: 55 °F (13 °C), Cloudy

Scoring summary
Q1	IOWA	Freeman 15 yard field goal	IOWA 0–3
Q1	OSU	Cassady 45 yard rush (Kriss kick)	OSU 7–3
Q2	OSU	Cassady 10 yard rush (Kriss kick failed)	OSU 13–3
Q2	IOWA	Freeman 5 yard pass from Reichow (Freeman kick)	OSU 13–10
Q4	OSU	Cassady 3 yard run (Kriss kick)	OSU 20–10

=== Michigan ===
Team Statistics
Statistic	Michigan	Ohio State
Pass Atts.	9	3
Pass Comps.	3	1
Pass Yards	14	4
Yds./Pass	4.7	4.0
Rush Atts.	31	72
Rush Yards	95	333
Yds./Rush	3.1	4.6
Total Yards	109	337
Fumbles Lost	0	2
Interceptions	2	0
Total Turnovers	2	2

Team	1	2	3	4	Total
• Ohio State	0	3	0	14	17
Michigan	0	0	0	0	0

- Date: November 19
- Location: Michigan Stadium
- Game attendance: 97,369
- Game weather: Fair

Scoring summary
Q2	OSU	Kriss 17 yard field goal	OSU 3–0
Q4	OSU	Cassady 2 yard rush (Sutherin kick failed)	OSU 9–0
Q4	OSU	Vicic 1 yard rush (Sutherin kick failed)	OSU 15–0
Q4	OSU	Safety	OSU 17–0

== Coaching staff ==
- Woody Hayes - Head Coach - 5th year

== Awards and honors ==
- Howard Cassady, Heisman Trophy

== In popular culture ==
The November 12 game against Iowa was mentioned in the movie Back to the Future Part II. A radio announcer telling the scores of the day's games mentions that Ohio State beat Iowa 20–10.

== 1956 NFL draftees ==
Player	Round	Pick	Position	NFL club
Howard Cassady	1	3	Halfback	Detroit Lions
Fran Machinsky	4	41	Tackle	Washington Redskins
Ken Vargo	9	106	Center	Chicago Bears
Jerry Harkrader	22	261	Back	New York Giants
