= 1956 NFL draft =

National Football League draft

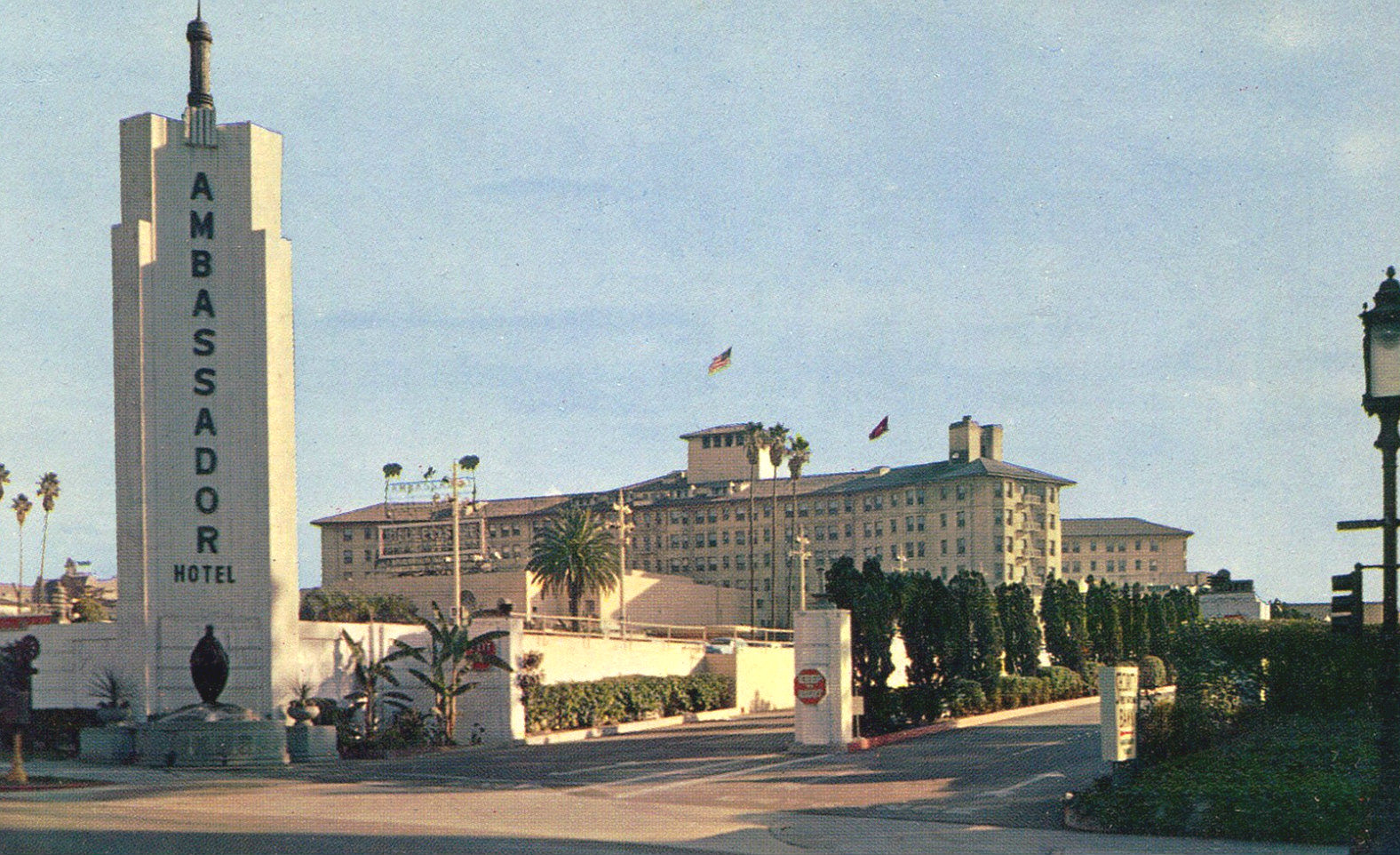
- The Ambassador Hotel (venue of the final 25 rounds), photographed in 1959

General information
- Dates: November 28, 1955 & January 17–18, 1956
- Location: The Bellevue-Stratford Hotel in Philadelphia, Pennsylvania & Ambassador Hotel in Los Angeles, California

Overview
- 360 total selections in 30 rounds
- League: NFL
- First selection: Gary Glick, QB/S; Pittsburgh Steelers
- Mr. Irrelevant: Bob Bartholomew, OT; Cleveland Browns
- Most selections (36): Los Angeles Rams
- Fewest selections (28): Chicago Bears; New York Giants; Washington Redskins
- Hall of Famers: 5: RB Lenny Moore; OT Forrest Gregg; LB Sam Huff; DE Willie Davis; QB Bart Starr

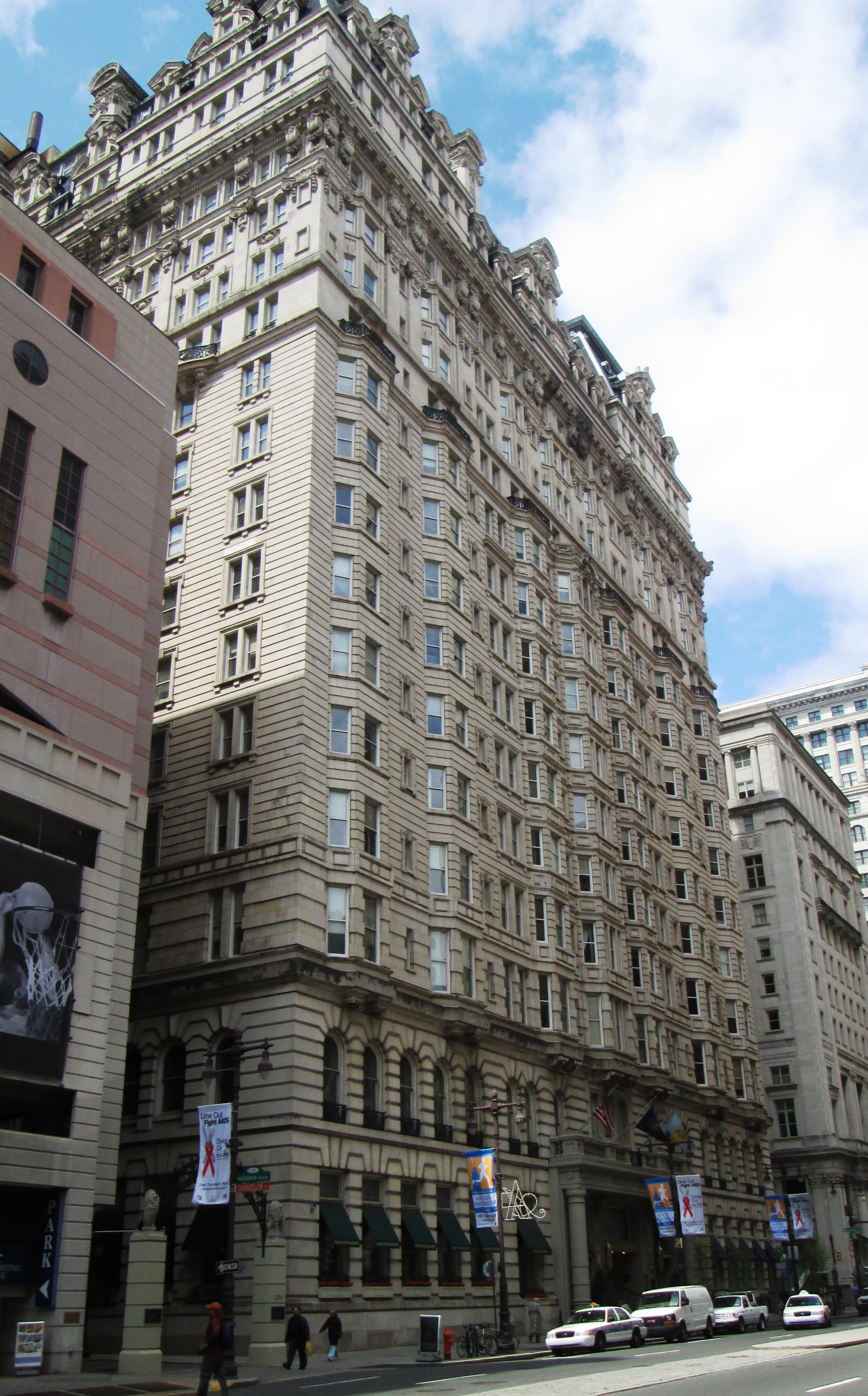
The Bellevue–Stratford (location of the first three rounds), photographed in 2013

The 1956 NFL draft had its first three rounds held on November 28, 1955, at the Bellevue-Stratford Hotel in Philadelphia, Pennsylvania, and its final twenty-seven rounds on January 17–18, 1956, at the Ambassador Hotel in Los Angeles, California

The previous NFL drafts in the 1950s were held in January; the first three rounds (37 selections) were moved up this year to late November to better compete with teams from Canada.

This was the tenth year that the first overall pick was a bonus pick determined by lottery. With the previous nine winners ineligible from the draw, only the Chicago Cardinals, Green Bay Packers, and Pittsburgh Steelers had an equal chance of winning. The draft lottery was won by Pittsburgh, who selected defensive back Gary Glick.

== Player selections ==
= Pro Bowler	= Hall of Famer

Rnd.	Pick	Team	Player	Pos.	College	Notes
1	1	Pittsburgh Steelers	Gary Glick	S	Colorado A&M	Bonus lottery pick
1	2	San Francisco 49ers	Earl Morrall ^{†}	QB	Michigan State	
1	3	Detroit Lions	Howard Cassady	HB	Ohio State	1955 Heisman Trophy winner
1	4	Philadelphia Eagles	Bob Pellegrini	C	Maryland	
1	5	Pittsburgh Steelers	Art Davis	HB	Mississippi State	
1	6	Los Angeles Rams	Joe Marconi ^{†}	FB	West Virginia	
1	7	Chicago Cardinals	Joe Childress	FB	Auburn	
1	8	Green Bay Packers	Jack Losch	HB	Miami (FL)	
1	9	Baltimore Colts	Lenny Moore^{‡}^{†}	HB	Penn State	
1	10	Chicago Bears	Menan Schriewer	E	Texas	
1	11	Los Angeles Rams	Charles Horton	HB	Vanderbilt	
1	12	Washington Redskins	Ed Vereb	HB	Maryland	
1	13	Cleveland Browns	Preston Carpenter	HB	Arkansas	
2	14	Los Angeles Rams	Leon Clarke ^{†}	E	USC	
2	15	San Francisco 49ers	Bruce Bosley ^{†}	T	West Virginia	
2	16	Philadelphia Eagles	Frank D'Agostino	T	Auburn	
2	17	Pittsburgh Steelers	Joe Krupa ^{†}	T	Purdue	
2	18	Chicago Cardinals	Norm Masters	T	Michigan State	
2	19	New York Giants	Henry Moore	B	Arkansas	
2	20	Green Bay Packers	Forrest Gregg^{‡}^{†}	T	SMU	
2	21	Baltimore Colts	Dick Donlin	E	Hamline	
2	22	Chicago Bears	M. L. Brackett	T	Auburn	
2	23	Los Angeles Rams	Hugh Pitts	C	TCU	
2	24	Washington Redskins	John Paluck ^{†}	E	Pittsburgh	
2	25	Cleveland Browns	Billy Kinard	B	Ole Miss	
3	26	San Francisco 49ers	Bill Herchman	T	Texas Tech	
3	27	Detroit Lions	Don McIlhenny	B	SMU	
3	28	Philadelphia Eagles	Don Schaefer	B	Notre Dame	
3	29	Pittsburgh Steelers	Jim Taylor	C	Baylor	
3	30	New York Giants	Sam Huff^{‡}^{†}	LB	West Virginia	
3	31	Chicago Cardinals	John Roach	QB	SMU	
3	32	Los Angeles Rams	A. D. Williams	DE	Pacific	
3	33	Baltimore Colts	Bob Pascal	B	Duke	
3	34	Cleveland Browns	Larry Ross	E	Denver	
3	35	Los Angeles Rams	John Marshall	B	SMU	
3	36	Washington Redskins	Fred Wyant	B	West Virginia	
3	37	Cleveland Browns	Bill Quinlan	E	Michigan State	
4	38	Detroit Lions	Jerry Reichow ^{†}	QB	Iowa	
4	39	Pittsburgh Steelers	Dick Murley	G	Purdue	
4	40	San Francisco 49ers	Frank Pajaczkowsi	B	Richmond	
4	41	Washington Redskins	Fran Machinsky	T	Ohio State	
4	42	Chicago Cardinals	Sam Salerno	T	Colorado	
4	43	Baltimore Colts	Ben Inabinet	T	Clemson	
4	44	Green Bay Packers	Cecil Morris	G	Oklahoma	
4	45	New York Giants	Jim Katcavage ^{†}	DE	Dayton	
4	46	Los Angeles Rams	Will Berzinski	B	La Crosse State	
4	47	Chicago Bears	John Mellekas	T	Arizona	
4	48	Los Angeles Rams	Jim Carmichael	E	California	
4	49	Cleveland Browns	Bobby Moss	B	West Virginia	
5	50	Detroit Lions	Tom Tracy ^{†}	B	Tennessee	
5	51	Los Angeles Rams	Jim Freeman	B	Iowa	
5	52	Pittsburgh Steelers	Bill Murakowski	B	Purdue	
5	53	Los Angeles Rams	Herb Nakken	B	Utah	
5	54	Philadelphia Eagles	Fred Thurston	G	Valparaiso	
5	55	Baltimore Colts	Herb Gray	E	Texas	
5	56	Green Bay Packers	Bob Skoronski ^{†}	T	Indiana	
5	57	New York Giants	Don Chandler ^{†}	B	Florida	
5	58	Chicago Bears	Willie Galimore ^{†}	B	Florida A&M	
5	59	Washington Redskins	Gary Lowe	B	Michigan State	
5	60	Los Angeles Rams	Jesse Whittenton ^{†}	CB	Texas Western	
5	61	Cleveland Browns	Franklin Clarke	E	Colorado	
6	62	Detroit Lions	Bob Lusk	C	William & Mary	
6	63	Pittsburgh Steelers	Ray Taylor	B	TCU	
6	64	San Francisco 49ers	Tony Sardisco	LB	Tulane	
6	65	Philadelphia Eagles	Tirrel Burton	B	Miami (OH)	
6	66	Chicago Cardinals	Charlie Dupre	B	Baylor	
6	67	Baltimore Colts	Don Schmidt	B	Texas Tech	
6	68	Green Bay Packers	Bob Burris	B	Oklahoma	
6	69	New York Giants	Fred Cason	B	Florida	
6	70	Chicago Cardinals	John Dittrich	T	Wisconsin	
6	71	Cleveland Browns	Sherman Plunkett ^{†}	E	Maryland State	
6	72	Los Angeles Rams	Eddie Vincent	B	Iowa	
6	73	Cleveland Browns	Paul Wiggin ^{†}	E	Stanford	
7	74	Detroit Lions	Gene Cronin	DE	Pacific	
7	75	San Francisco 49ers	Larry Barnes	B	Colorado A&M	
7	76	Pittsburgh Steelers	Dick Gaspari	C	George Washington	
7	77	Chicago Cardinals	Bob Konovsky	T	Wisconsin	
7	78	Philadelphia Eagles	John Waedekin	T	Hardin–Simmons	
7	79	Baltimore Colts	Bill Waters	T	Austin	
7	80	Green Bay Packers	Hank Gremminger	E	Baylor	
7	81	New York Giants	Ron Nery	T	Kansas State	
7	82	Chicago Bears	J. C. Caroline ^{†}	B	Illinois	
7	83	Washington Redskins	Donnie Caraway	B	Houston	
7	84	Los Angeles Rams	Jack Morris	B	Oregon	
7	85	Cleveland Browns	Chuck Griffith	E	USC	
8	86	Detroit Lions	Jack Powell	T	Texas A&M	
8	87	Pittsburgh Steelers	Vere Wellman	G	Wichita	
8	88	San Francisco 49ers	Charley Smith	E	Abilene Christian	
8	89	Philadelphia Eagles	Elroy Payne	B	McMurry	
8	90	Chicago Cardinals	Dave Lunceford	T	Baylor	
8	91	Baltimore Colts	Bill Koman ^{†}	G	North Carolina	
8	92	Green Bay Packers	Russ Dennis	E	Maryland	
8	93	New York Giants	Don Holleder	E	Army	
8	94	Washington Redskins	Dick James ^{†}	B	Oregon	
8	95	Chicago Bears	Dick Klawitter	C	South Dakota State	
8	96	Los Angeles Rams	George Boyer	LB	Florida State	
8	97	Cleveland Browns	Len Hellyer	B	Marshall	
9	98	Detroit Lions	Calvin Jones	G	Iowa	
9	99	San Francisco 49ers	Jim Cox	E	Cal Poly	
9	100	Pittsburgh Steelers	Wayne Edmonds	G	Notre Dame	
9	101	Chicago Cardinals	Bob Lovely	T	Tampa	
9	102	Philadelphia Eagles	John Bredice	E	Boston University	
9	103	Baltimore Colts	John Lewis	E	Michigan State	
9	104	Green Bay Packers	Gordy Duvall	B	USC	
9	105	New York Giants	Ken Braden	C	East Texas State	
9	106	Chicago Bears	Ken Vargo	C	Ohio State	
9	107	Washington Redskins	Whitey Rouviere	B	Miami (FL)	
9	108	Los Angeles Rams	Maury Woolford	T	Louisville	
9	109	Cleveland Browns	Jack Hecker	E	Bowling Green	
10	110	Detroit Lions	Joe Silas	DE	South Carolina	
10	111	Pittsburgh Steelers	Lou Baldacci	B	Michigan	
10	112	San Francisco 49ers	Jerry Zaleski	B	Colorado A&M	
10	113	Philadelphia Eagles	Tom Dimmick	C	Houston	
10	114	Chicago Cardinals	Willis Towne	E	Wichita	
10	115	Baltimore Colts	Gene Scott	B	Centre	
10	116	Green Bay Packers	Bob Laugherty	B	Maryland	
10	117	New York Giants	Johnny Hermann	B	UCLA	
10	118	Pittsburgh Steelers	Bob Nolan	E	Miami (FL)	
10	119	Chicago Bears	Dick Lucas	E	Boston College	
10	120	Los Angeles Rams	Charlie Sticka	B	Trinity (CT)	
10	121	Cleveland Browns	Eddie Rayburn	T	Rice	
11	122	Detroit Lions	Lew Wacker	B	Richmond	
11	123	San Francisco 49ers	Stew Pell	T	North Carolina	
11	124	Detroit Lions	Tom Selep	B	Maryland	
11	125	Chicago Bears	Fob James	B	Auburn	
11	126	Philadelphia Eagles	Ken Keller	B	North Carolina	
11	127	Baltimore Colts	Dennis Shaw	E	North Texas State	
11	128	Green Bay Packers	Mike Hudock	C	Miami (FL)	
11	129	New York Giants	Dick Moloney	B	Kentucky	
11	130	Chicago Bears	John Jankans	E	Arizona State	
11	131	Washington Redskins	Tom Powell	G	Colgate	
11	132	Los Angeles Rams	Jim Decker	B	UCLA	
11	133	Cleveland Browns	Bill Underdonk	T	West Virginia	
12	134	Detroit Lions	Bob Nunnery	T	LSU	
12	135	Pittsburgh Steelers	Phil Tarasovic	E	Yale	
12	136	San Francisco 49ers	Roger Swedberg	T	Iowa	
12	137	Philadelphia Eagles	Tommy Harkins	E	Vanderbilt	
12	138	Chicago Cardinals	Jerry Walker	T	Texas Tech	
12	139	Baltimore Colts	Steve Myhra	G	North Dakota	
12	140	Green Bay Packers	Max Burnett	B	Arizona	
12	141	Washington Redskins	Gerry Planutis	B	Michigan State	
12	142	Washington Redskins	Gil Moreno	T	UCLA	
12	143	Chicago Bears	Buddy Cruze	E	Tennessee	
12	144	Los Angeles Rams	Em Lindbeck	QB	Illinois	
12	145	Cleveland Browns	Harry Javernick	T	Colorado	
13	146	Detroit Lions	O. K. Ferguson	B	LSU	
13	147	San Francisco 49ers	Ralph Moody	B	Kansas	
13	148	Pittsburgh Steelers	Weldon Holley	B	Baylor	
13	149	Chicago Cardinals	Bo Bolinger	G	Oklahoma	
13	150	Philadelphia Eagles	James Sides	B	Texas Tech	
13	151	Baltimore Colts	Jack Hill	B	Utah State	
13	152	Green Bay Packers	Jim Mense	C	Notre Dame	
13	153	New York Giants	Ed Crawford	B	Ole Miss	
13	154	Chicago Bears	Dick Grogg	G	Minnesota	
13	155	Washington Redskins	Jerry Ward	G	Dayton	
13	156	Los Angeles Rams	Mike Norcia	B	Kent State	
13	157	Cleveland Browns	Jim Furey	C	Kansas State	
14	158	Detroit Lions	Ronnie Falls	LB	Duke	
14	159	Pittsburgh Steelers	Jim Emmons	T	Alabama	
14	160	San Francisco 49ers	R. C. Owens	E	College of Idaho	
14	161	Philadelphia Eagles	Frank Reich	C	Penn State	
14	162	Chicago Cardinals	Carnell Neuman	B	Illinois	
14	163	Baltimore Colts	Ted Schwanger	B	Tennessee Tech	
14	164	Green Bay Packers	Charlie Thomas	B	Wisconsin	
14	165	New York Giants	John McMullan	G	Notre Dame	
14	166	Washington Redskins	Pat Uebel	B	Army	
14	167	Chicago Bears	Milt Graham	E	Colgate	
14	168	Los Angeles Rams	Tom Runnels	B	North Texas State	
14	169	Cleveland Browns	Charlie Sidwell	B	William & Mary	
15	170	Detroit Lions	Horace "Buzzy" Allert	DE	Southwest Texas State	
15	171	San Francisco 49ers	Reed Henderson	T	Utah State	
15	172	San Francisco 49ers	Gene Boyd	B	Abilene Christian	
15	173	Chicago Cardinals	Charley Anderson	E	Louisiana Tech	
15	174	Philadelphia Eagles	Don Brant	B	Montana	
15	175	Baltimore Colts	John Polzer	QB	Virginia	
15	176	Green Bay Packers	Buddy Alliston	G	Ole Miss	
15	177	New York Giants	Ron Melnik	T	Army	
15	178	Chicago Bears	Dick Fitzgerald	B	Notre Dame	
15	179	Chicago Cardinals	Tom Spiers	QB	Arkansas State	
15	180	Los Angeles Rams	Dick Shatto	B	Kentucky	
15	181	Cleveland Browns	Willie Davis^{‡}^{†}	DE	Grambling	
16	182	Detroit Lions	Len Zyzda	DE	Purdue	
16	183	Pittsburgh Steelers	Lionel Reed	B	Central State (OK)	
16	184	San Francisco 49ers	George Herring	QB	Mississippi Southern	
16	185	Philadelphia Eagles	Billy Hix	T	Middle Tennessee State	
16	186	Chicago Cardinals	George Welsh	QB	Navy	
16	187	Baltimore Colts	Gene "Moose" Hendrix	B	Drake	
16	188	Green Bay Packers	Curtis Lynch	T	Alabama	
16	189	New York Giants	Al Portney	T	Missouri	
16	190	Washington Redskins	Wells Gray	G	Wisconsin	
16	191	Chicago Bears	Ray Brown	B	Florida	
16	192	Los Angeles Rams	Arnie Pelluer	E	Washington State	
16	193	Cleveland Browns	Thurlow Cooper	E	Maine	
17	194	Detroit Lions	Ken Wind	E	Houston	
17	195	San Francisco 49ers	Dick Weiss	T	Ole Miss	
17	196	Pittsburgh Steelers	Bill Schmitt	G	Pittsburgh	
17	197	Chicago Cardinals	Ron Beagle	E	Navy	
17	198	Philadelphia Eagles	Joe Mastrogiovanni	B	Wyoming	
17	199	Baltimore Colts	Bill Danenhauer	E	Emporia State	
17	200	Green Bay Packers	Bart Starr^{‡}^{†}	QB	Alabama	
17	201	New York Giants	Tom Mooney	T	Miami (OH)	
17	202	Chicago Bears	Tom Adams	E	UCLA	
17	203	Washington Redskins	Eagle Day	QB	Ole Miss	
17	204	Los Angeles Rams	Jack Bulter	T	Kentucky	
17	205	Cleveland Browns	Eddie West	QB	NC State	
18	206	Detroit Lions	Emidio Petrarca	B	Boston College	
18	207	Pittsburgh Steelers	John Stephans	QB	Holy Cross	
18	208	San Francisco 49ers	Bill Yelverton	T	Ole Miss	
18	209	Philadelphia Eagles	Nick Consoles	DB	Wake Forest	
18	210	Chicago Cardinals	Jim Brown	G	UCLA	
18	211	Baltimore Colts	Earl Looman	G	Stetson	
18	212	Green Bay Packers	Stan Intihar	E	Cornell	
18	213	New York Giants	Matt Boone	B	North Carolina College	
18	214	Washington Redskins	Jim Pyburn	E	Auburn	
18	215	Chicago Bears	Earl Payton	B	Prairie View A&M	
18	216	Los Angeles Rams	Jack Klotz	T	Pennsylvania Military	
18	217	Cleveland Browns	Hal "Candy" Carroll	B	Western Reserve	
19	218	Detroit Lions	Dale Vaughn	B	VMI	
19	219	San Francisco 49ers	Pete Arrigoni	B	Arizona	
19	220	Pittsburgh Steelers	Jerry Jacobs	G	Florida State	
19	221	Chicago Cardinals	Ray Zagar	B	Marquette	
19	222	Philadelphia Eagles	Delano Womack	B	Texas	
19	223	Baltimore Colts	Bob Fyvie	T	Lafayette	
19	224	Green Bay Packers	Ken Vakey	E	Texas Tech	
19	225	New York Giants	Ray Dettring	B	Missouri	
19	226	Chicago Bears	John Smith	B	UCLA	
19	227	Washington Redskins	Ray Lemek ^{†}	G	Notre Dame	
19	228	Los Angeles Rams	Charlie Dees	T	McNeese State	
19	229	Cleveland Browns	John Sebest	E	Eastern Kentucky	
20	230	Detroit Lions	Joe Stephenson	E	Vanderbilt	
20	231	Pittsburgh Steelers	Fred Glatz	E	Pittsburgh	
20	232	San Francisco 49ers	Bob Scarbrough	C	Auburn	
20	233	Philadelphia Eagles	Darrell Glover	T	Maryland State	
20	234	Chicago Cardinals	Dickie Mattison	B	Georgia Tech	
20	235	Baltimore Colts	Robert Hill	B	Jackson State	
20	236	Green Bay Packers	Clyde Letbetter	T	Baylor	
20	237	New York Giants	Mike Falls	G	Minnesota	
20	238	Washington Redskins	Vince Gonzales	B	LSU	
20	239	Chicago Bears	Charley Maxime	G	Auburn	
20	240	Los Angeles Rams	John Coyne	T	West Chester	
20	241	Cleveland Browns	Joe Mobra	E	Oklahoma	
21	242	Detroit Lions	Bob Blechen	C	Whittier	
21	243	San Francisco 49ers	L.C. Joyner	E	Contra Costa J.C.	
21	244	Pittsburgh Steelers	Gene Martell	T	Notre Dame	
21	245	Chicago Cardinals	Ronnie Herr	B	Texas Tech	
21	246	Philadelphia Eagles	Jack Adams	T	San Jose State	
21	247	Baltimore Colts	Jim Harness	B	Mississippi State	
21	248	Green Bay Packers	Hal O'Brien	B	SMU	
21	249	New York Giants	Don McComb	E	Villanova	
21	250	Chicago Bears	Jimmy Waddell	B	Compton J.C.	
21	251	Washington Redskins	Howard Schnellenberger	E	Kentucky	
21	252	Los Angeles Rams	Milt Robichaux	E	Trinity	
21	253	Cleveland Browns	Gene Kapish	E	Notre Dame	
22	254	Detroit Lions	Dick Marazza	T	Clemson	
22	255	Pittsburgh Steelers	Ray DiPasquale	B	Pittsburgh	
22	256	San Francisco 49ers	Clarence Wessman	E	San Jose State	
22	257	Philadelphia Eagles	Joe Miller	B	Cincinnati	
22	258	Chicago Cardinals	Jim Murphy	T	Stephen F. Austin	
22	259	Baltimore Colts	Pat Del Vicaro	G	Mississippi Southern	
22	260	Green Bay Packers	Johnny Popson	B	Furman	
22	261	New York Giants	Jerry Harkrader	B	Ohio State	
22	262	Washington Redskins	George Nicula	T	Notre Dame	
22	263	Chicago Bears	Joe Billings	T	Memphis State	
22	264	Los Angeles Rams	Dick Fouts	E	Missouri	
22	265	Cleveland Browns	Sam "First Down" Brown	B	UCLA	
23	266	Detroit Lions	Bob Garrard	B	Georgia	
23	267	San Francisco 49ers	Mike Monroe	B	Washington	
23	268	Pittsburgh Steelers	Pete Neft	QB	Pittsburgh	
23	269	Chicago Cardinals	Tony Branoff	B	Michigan	
23	270	Philadelphia Eagles	Chet Spencer	E	Oklahoma A&M	
23	271	Baltimore Colts	Al "Bear" Stephenson	T	Idaho State	
23	272	Green Bay Packers	Jesse Birchfield	G	Duke	
23	273	New York Giants	Bob "Slick" McCool	B	Ole Miss	
23	274	Chicago Bears	Lou Holt	E	Howard Payne	
23	275	Washington Redskins	Don St. John	B	Xavier	
23	276	Los Angeles Rams	Al Paulson	B	Washington State	
23	277	Cleveland Browns	Don Althouse	E	Syracuse	
24	278	Detroit Lions	Jarv Walz	E	Central Michigan	
24	279	Pittsburgh Steelers	Bryan Engram	E	TCU	
24	280	San Francisco 49ers	Ed Wallace	T	San Diego J.C.	
24	281	Philadelphia Eagles	John Parham	B	Wake Forest	
24	282	Chicago Cardinals	Orville Trask	T	Rice	
24	283	Baltimore Colts	Bobby Fox	QB	East Texas State	
24	284	Green Bay Packers	Don Wilson	C	Rice	
24	285	New York Giants	Gerry Huth	G	Wake Forest	
24	286	Washington Redskins	John Tatum	C	Texas	
24	287	Chicago Bears	Jesse Castete	B	McNeese State	
24	288	Los Angeles Rams	Sam Williams	DE	Michigan State	
24	289	Cleveland Browns	Jim Hughes	G	San Jose State	
25	290	Detroit Lions	Jerry Hall	B	Rice	
25	291	San Francisco 49ers	Paul Goad	B	Abilene Christian	
25	292	Pittsburgh Steelers	Bill O'Dell	B	Clemson	
25	293	Chicago Cardinals	Bill Wheeler	T	Kentucky	
25	294	Philadelphia Eagles	Johnny Grogan	T	Dayton	
25	295	Baltimore Colts	Brad Mills	B	Kentucky	
25	296	Green Bay Packers	Franz Koeneke	E	Minnesota	
25	297	New York Giants	Harry Speers	B	Florida	
25	298	Chicago Bears	Jerry Hentschel	T	Sam Houston State	
25	299	Washington Redskins	Franklin Brooks	G	Georgia Tech	
25	300	Los Angeles Rams	Glen Tunning	G	Pittsburgh	
25	301	Cleveland Browns	Bob Davenport	B	UCLA	
26	302	Detroit Lions	Joe Walden	B	West Texas State	
26	303	Pittsburgh Steelers	Frank Sweeney	G	Xavier	
26	304	San Francisco 49ers	Rommie Loudd	E	UCLA	
26	305	Philadelphia Eagles	Earl Lunsford	B	Oklahoma A&M	
26	306	Chicago Cardinals	Chuck Zickefoose	E	Kansas State	
26	307	Baltimore Colts	Jim Lohr	T	Southwest Missouri State	
26	308	Green Bay Packers	Dick Goehe	T	Ole Miss	
26	309	New York Giants	Bev Buller	B	Kansas	
26	310	Washington Redskins	Dave Burnham	B	Wheaton (IL)	
26	311	Chicago Bears	Don Orr	B	Vanderbilt	
26	312	Los Angeles Rams	Hardiman Cureton	T	UCLA	
26	313	Cleveland Browns	Jack Kammerman	E	Utah	
27	314	Detroit Lions	Bryan Burnthorne	G	Tulane	
27	315	San Francisco 49ers	Jerry Gustafson		Stanford	
27	316	Pittsburgh Steelers	Buddy Benson	B	Arkansas	
27	317	Chicago Cardinals	Jack Hutchinson	T	Oklahoma A&M	
27	318	Philadelphia Eagles	Al Ellett	T	Alabama	
27	319	Baltimore Colts	Herb Hartwell	B	Virginia	
27	320	Green Bay Packers	Dick Kolian	E	Wisconsin	
27	321	New York Giants	Gerry Nesbitt	B	Arkansas	
27	322	Chicago Bears	Waylon Buchanan	E	East Texas State	
27	323	Washington Redskins	Royce Flippin	B	Princeton	
27	324	Los Angeles Rams	Roger Siesel	T	Miami (OH)	
27	325	Cleveland Browns	Ed Dwyer	E	Purdue	
28	326	Detroit Lions	John Smith	G	Northwestern	
28	327	Pittsburgh Steelers	Bill DeGraaf	B	Cornell	
28	328	San Francisco 49ers	Jerry Drew	B	California	
28	329	Philadelphia Eagles	Bill Strwan	LB	Western Kentucky	
28	330	Chicago Cardinals	Jim Miller	QB	Wisconsin	
28	331	Baltimore Colts	John Shearer	QB	Shepherd	
28	332	Green Bay Packers	Bobby Lance	QB	Florida	
28	333	New York Giants	Bill Fuller	T	Arkansas	
28	334	Washington Redskins	Billy Hicks	B	Jacksonville State	
28	335	Chicago Bears	Bob Alexander	B	Trinity (CT)	
28	336	Los Angeles Rams	John Morrow	T	Michigan	
28	337	Cleveland Browns	Ollie Sparks	G	Iowa State	
29	338	Detroit Lions	Doug Peters	B	UCLA	
29	339	San Francisco 49ers	Dean Venson	G	Willamette	
29	342	Pittsburgh Steelers	Wes Thompson	T	Alabama	
29	341	Chicago Cardinals	Jim Troglio	B	Northwestern	
29	342	Philadelphia Eagles	Bob Hughes	B	Mississippi Southern	
29	343	Baltimore Colts	Jim Rusher	E	Kansas State	
29	344	Green Bay Packers	Vester Newcomb	C	Southwest J. C.	Decided to transfer to Miami (FL)
29	345	New York Giants	Jim Nelson	G	Duke	
29	346	Chicago Bears	Jim Nelson	G	Duke	
29	346	Chicago Bears	Billy Krietemeyer	B	Vanderbilt	
29	347	Washington Redskins	Pat Bisceglia	G	Notre Dame	
29	348	Los Angeles Rams	Mickey Bates	B	Illinois	
29	349	Cleveland Browns	John Battos	E	Vanderbilt	
30	350	Detroit Lions	John Gibbens	T	Southwest Texas State	
30	351	San Francisco 49ers	Bob Mitchell	T	Puget Sound	
30	352	Philadelphia Eagles	Joe Ulm	B	San Jose State	
30	353	Chicago Cardinals	Bill Kucera	T	Colorado	
30	354	Baltimore Colts	Terry Sweeney	B	Middle Tennessee State	
30	355	Green Bay Packers	Rod Hermes	QB	Beloit	
30	356	New York Giants	Wayne Williams	E	Southern Illinois	
30	357	Washington Redskins	Buck Nystrom	G	Michigan State	
30	358	Chicago Bears	Jim Buckler	G	Alabama	
30	359	Los Angeles Rams	Dick Kackmeister	C	Central Michigan	
30	360	Cleveland Browns	Bob Bartholomew	T	Wake Forest	

== Hall of Famers ==
- Lenny Moore, halfback from Penn State taken 1st round 9th overall by the Baltimore Colts.

Inducted: Professional Football Hall of Fame class of 1975.

- Forrest Gregg, offensive tackle from Southern Methodist University taken 2nd round 20th overall by the Green Bay Packers.

Inducted: Professional Football Hall of Fame class of 1977.

- Bart Starr, quarterback from University of Alabama taken 17th round 200th overall by the Green Bay Packers.

Inducted: Professional Football Hall of Fame class of 1977.

- Willie Davis, defensive end from Grambling State University taken 15th round 181st overall by the Cleveland Browns.

Inducted: Professional Football Hall of Fame class of 1981.

- Sam Huff, linebacker from West Virginia taken 3rd round 30th overall by the New York Giants.

Inducted: Professional Football Hall of Fame class of 1982.

== Notable undrafted players ==
^{†}	= Pro Bowler

Original NFL team	Player	Pos.	College	Notes
Chicago Cardinals	Carl Brettschneider	LB	Iowa State	
Los Angeles Rams	Tommy Wilson ^{†}	RB		
San Francisco 49ers	Clyde Conner	WR	Pacific	
San Francisco 49ers	John Gonzaga	T		
