= 1956 San Francisco 49ers season =

American football team season

- Owner: Tony Morabito
- General manager: Louis Spadia
- Head coach: Frankie Albert
- Home stadium: Kezar Stadium

Results
- Record: 5–6–1
- Division place: 3rd NFL Western
- Playoffs: Did not qualify

The 1956 San Francisco 49ers season was the team's seventh season in the National Football League (NFL) (eleventh in team history).

San Francisco brought in a new head coach for the second straight season, replacing Red Strader with former 49ers quarterback Frankie Albert, who played with the team from their AAFC days in 1946 until 1952.

The Niners got off to a rough start, winning just one of their first seven games, before going unbeaten down the stretch. The team finished the year with a 5–6–1 record, good for 3rd place in the Western Conference.

Offensively, Y. A. Tittle threw for a team-high 1,641 yards and 7 touchdowns, and had 56.9% of his passes completed. Hugh McElhenny rushed for a team-best 916 yards and 8 touchdowns, while Billy Wilson caught a club-high 60 receptions for 889 yards, along with 5 touchdowns. Bob St. Clair blocked 10 field goal attempts.

== Offseason ==
=== 1956 NFL draft ===
1956 San Francisco 49ers draft
| Round | Pick | Player | Position | College | Notes |
| 1 | 2 | Earl Morrall * | Quarterback | Michigan State | |
| 2 | 15 | Bruce Bosley * | Center | West Virginia | |
| 3 | 26 | Bill Herchman | Defensive tackle | Texas Tech | |
| 4 | 40 | Frank Pajaczkowski | Back | Richmond | |
| 6 | 64 | Tony Sardisco | Guard | Tulane | |
| 7 | 75 | Larry Barnes | Fullback | Colorado State | played with 49ers in 1957. |
| 8 | 88 | Charley Smith | Defensive end | Abilene Christian | |
| 9 | 99 | Jim Cox | End | Cal Poly | |
| 10 | 112 | Jerry Zaleski | Back | Colorado State | |
| 11 | 123 | Stew Pell | Tackle | North Carolina | |
| 12 | 136 | Roger Swedberg | Tackle | Iowa | |
| 13 | 147 | Ralph Moody | Back | Kansas | |
| 14 | 160 | R. C. Owens | Halfback | College of Idaho | began play with 49ers in 1957. |
| 15 | 171 | Reed Henderson | Tackle | Utah State | signed with Edmonton Eskimos (WIFU) |
| 15 | 172 | Gene Boyd | Back | Abilene Christian | |
| 16 | 184 | George Herring | Quarterback | Mississippi Southern | |
| 17 | 195 | Dick Weiss | Tackle | Ole Miss | |
| 18 | 208 | Bill Yelverton | Defensive end | Ole Miss | |
| 19 | 219 | Pete Arrigoni | Back | Arizona | |
| 20 | 232 | Bob Scarbrough | Center | Auburn | |
| 21 | 243 | L.C. Joyner | Halfback | Contra Costa JC | |
| 22 | 256 | Clarence Wessman | End | San Jose State | |
| 23 | 267 | Mike Monroe | Back | Washington | |
| 24 | 280 | Ed Wallace | Tackle | San Diego City College | |
| 25 | 291 | Paul Goad | Fullback | Abilene Christian | |
| 26 | 304 | Rommie Loudd | Linebacker | UCLA | signed with BC Lions (WIFU) |
| 27 | 315 | Jerry Gustafson | Quarterback | Stanford | signed with BC Lions (WIFU) |
| 28 | 328 | Jerry Drew | Back | California | |
| 29 | 339 | Dean Benson | Guard | Willamette | |
| 30 | 351 | Bob Mitchell | Tackle | Puget Sound | |
Made roster * Made at least one Pro Bowl during career

== Preseason ==
| Week | Date | Opponent | Result | Record | Venue |
|---|---|---|---|---|---|
| 1 | August 19 | Cleveland Browns | W 28–17 | 1–0 | Kezar Stadium |
| 2 | August 26 | Washington Redskins | W 20–0 | 2–0 | Kezar Stadium |
| 3 | September 2 | Chicago Cardinals | W 14–13 | 3–0 | Kezar Stadium |
| 4 | September 9 | vs. New York Giants | L 14–21 | 3–1 | Multnomah Stadium |
| 5 | September 14 | at Los Angeles Rams | L 24–33 | 3–2 | Los Angeles Memorial Coliseum |
| 6 | September 23 | vs. Philadelphia Eagles | L 14–21 | 3–3 | Charles C. Hughes Stadium |

== Regular season ==
=== Schedule ===
| Game | Date | Opponent | Result | Record | Venue | Attendance | Recap | Sources |
|---|---|---|---|---|---|---|---|---|
| 1 | September 30 | New York Giants | **L** 21–38 | 0–1 | Kezar Stadium | 41,751 | Recap | |
| 2 | October 7 | **Los Angeles Rams** | **W** 33–30 | 1–1 | Kezar Stadium | 56,489 | Recap | |
| 3 | October 14 | **Chicago Bears** | **L** 7–31 | 1–2 | Wrigley Field | 47,526 | Recap | |
| 4 | October 21 | **Detroit Lions** | **L** 17–20 | 1–3 | Briggs Stadium | 55,662 | Recap | |
| 5 | October 28 | **Chicago Bears** | **L** 21–38 | 1–4 | Kezar Stadium | 52,612 | Recap | |
| 6 | November 4 | **Detroit Lions** | **L** 13–17 | 1–5 | Kezar Stadium | 46,708 | Recap | |
| 7 | November 11 | **Los Angeles Rams** | **L** 6–30 | 1–6 | L.A. Memorial Coliseum | 69,828 | Recap | |
| 8 | November 18 | **Green Bay Packers** | **W** 17–16 | 2–6 | City Stadium | 17,986 | Recap | |
| 9 | November 25 | Philadelphia Eagles | **T** 10–10 | 2–6–1 | Connie Mack Stadium | 19,326 | Recap | |
| 10 | December 2 | **Baltimore Colts** | **W** 20–17 | 3–6–1 | Memorial Stadium | 37,227 | Recap | |
| 11 | December 8 | **Green Bay Packers** | **W** 38–20 | 4–6–1 | Kezar Stadium | 32,433 | Recap | |
| 12 | December 16 | **Baltimore Colts** | **W** 30–17 | 5–6–1 | Kezar Stadium | 43,791 | Recap | |
Note: Intra-conference opponents are in **bold** text.

== Standings ==
Program from the 1956 season finale against the visiting Baltimore Colts.

NFL Western Conference
| | W | L | T | PCT | CONF | PF | PA | STK |
|---|---|---|---|---|---|---|---|---|
| Chicago Bears | 9 | 2 | 1 | .818 | 8–2 | 363 | 246 | W2 |
| Detroit Lions | 9 | 3 | 0 | .750 | 8–2 | 300 | 188 | L1 |
| San Francisco 49ers | 5 | 6 | 1 | .455 | 5–5 | 233 | 284 | W3 |
| Baltimore Colts | 5 | 7 | 0 | .417 | 3–7 | 270 | 322 | W1 |
| Los Angeles Rams | 4 | 8 | 0 | .333 | 3–7 | 291 | 307 | W2 |
| Green Bay Packers | 4 | 8 | 0 | .333 | 3–7 | 264 | 342 | L2 |

Note: Tie games were not officially counted in the standings until 1972.

== Personnel ==
=== Staff / Coaches ===
1957 San Francisco 49ers staff
| Front office: Team Owner - Tony Morabito; General manager – Louis Spadia; Head coaches: Head coach - Frankie Albert; Offensive coaches: Chief of Offense / Offensive Coordinator - Red Hickey | Defensive coaches: Defensive Assistant – Phil Bengtson; Special teams coaches: None - N/A |

=== Roster ===
1956 San Francisco 49ers roster
| Quarterbacks: 11 Earl Morrall P; 14 Y. A. Tittle; Running backs: 35 John Henry Johnson; 43 Tom McCormick; 39 Hugh McElhenny; 34 Joe Perry; Receivers: 22 Joe Arenas; 86 Clyde Conner; 82 Gordy Soltau K; 84 Billy Wilson | Offensive linemen: 64 Ted Connolly G; 78 Bobby Cross T; 76 John Gonzaga T/G; 52 George Morris C; 68 Lou Palatella G; 79 Bob St. Clair T; 74 Bob Toneff G/DT; Defensive linemen: 75 Ed Henke DE/G/T; 72 Bill Herchman DT; 77 Bruce Bosley DE; 80 Charlie Smith DE/WR; 87 Charley Powell DE/MLB; 73 Leo Nomellini DT | Linebackers: 54 Ed Beatty MLB/C; 55 Matt Hazeltine OLB; 50 Stan Sheriff OLB; Defensive backs: 23 Rex Berry S/CB; 57 Paul Carr CB; 24 J. D. Smith S; 27 Bob Holladay S; 40 George Maderos CB; 47 Dicky Moegle S/RB; 42 Floyd Sagely CB | Reserve lists: 36 Paul Goad RB (IR); 85 Bill Jessup WR (IR); 53 Bill Johnson C (IR); rookies in italics |
