= 1956 Philadelphia Eagles season =

NFL team season

- Owner: Happy Hundred
- Head coach: Hugh Devore

Results
- Record: 3–8–1
- Division place: 6th NFL Eastern
- Playoffs: Did not qualify

The 1956 Philadelphia Eagles season was their 24th in the league. They failed to improve on their previous output of 4–7–1, winning only three games. The team failed to qualify for the playoffs for the seventh consecutive season.

== Off season ==
The Eagles change coaches during the off season. Jim Trimble was fired on December 12, and they hired Hugh Devore. Jim Trimble's legacy is more connected to football products, thanks to his "slingshot" goal posts. In 1966 would design and market the idea. Today they are the common goal post at football games.

For the 6th year in a row the Eagles hold training camp in Hershey, Pennsylvania. They continued to hold training camp there until 1967.

=== NFL draft ===
The 1956 NFL draft was held on November 29, 1955. The draft was 30 rounds long, with 12 teams making picks. A total of 360 players were selected. The Pittsburgh Steelers got this year's lottery bonus pick and with it they selected Gary Glick a quarterback that went to Colorado State University.

The 1955 Eagles finished with a 4–7–1 record and will get to pick 4th or 5th in the rounds with the Chicago Cardinals. With their first round pick the Eagles selected Bob Pellegrini He was featured on the cover of the November 7, 1955, edition of Sports Illustrated magazine. a Center from the University of Maryland, College Park. The Eagles made a total of 30 picks in this year's draft.

=== Player selections ===
The table shows the Eagles selections and what picks they had that were traded away and the team that ended up with that pick. It is possible the Eagles' pick ended up with this team via another team that the Eagles made a trade with. Not shown are acquired picks that the Eagles traded away.

= Pro Bowler	= Hall of Famer

Rd	Pick	Player	Position	School
1	4	Bob Pellegrini	Center	Maryland Terrapins
2	16	Frank D'Agostino	Tackle	Auburn Tigers
3	28	Don Schaefer	Back	Notre Dame Fighting Irish
4	41	_{Choice to Washington Redskins}		
5	54	Fred "Fuzzy" Thurston	Guard	Valparaiso Crusaders
6	65	Tirrel Burton	Back	Miami (OH) RedHawks
7	78	John Waedekin	Tackle	Hardin–Simmons Cowboys
8	89	Elroy Payne	Back	McMurry University Warhawks
9	102	Johnny Bredice	End	Boston University Terriers
10	113	Tom Dimmick	Center	Houston Cougars
11	126	Ken Keller	Back	North Carolina Tar Heels
12	137	Tommy Harkins	End	Vanderbilt Commodores
13	150	James Sides	Back	Texas Tech Red Raiders
14	161	Frank Reich	Center	Penn State Nittany Lions
15	174	Don Brant	Back	University of Montana Grizzlies
16	185	Billy Hix	Tackle	Middle Tennessee Blue Raiders
17	198	Joe Mastrogiovanni	Back	University of Wyoming Cowboys
18	209	Nick Consoles	Defensive back	Wake Forest Demon Deacons
19	222	Delano Womack	Back	Texas Longhorns
20	233	Darrell Glover	Tackle	Maryland-Eastern Shore Hawks
21	246	Jack Adams	Tackle	San Jose State Spartans
22	257	Joe Miller	Back	Cincinnati Bearcats
23	270	Chet Spencer	End	Oklahoma State Cowboys
24	281	John Parham	Back	Wake Forest
25	294	Johnny Grogan	Tackle	University of Dayton Flyers
26	305	Earl Lunsford	Back	Oklahoma State
27	318	Al Ellett	Tackle	University of Alabama Crimson Tide
28	329	Bill Strawn	Linebacker	Western Kentucky Hilltoppers
29	342	Bob Hughes	Back	Southern Mississippi Golden Eagles
30	352	Joe Ulm	Back	San Jose State

== Schedule ==
Week	Date	Opponent	Result	Record	Venue	Attendance	Recap
1	September 30	at Los Angeles Rams	**L** 7–27	0–1	Los Angeles Memorial Coliseum	54,412	Recap
2	October 6	**Washington Redskins**	**W** 13–9	1–1	Connie Mack Stadium	26,607	Recap
3	October 14	at **Pittsburgh Steelers**	**W** 35–21	2–1	Forbes Field	31,375	Recap
4	October 21	**Chicago Cardinals**	**L** 6–20	2–2	Connie Mack Stadium	36,545	Recap
5	October 28	at **New York Giants**	**L** 3–20	2–3	Yankee Stadium	40,960	Recap
6	November 4	at **Chicago Cardinals**	**L** 17–28	2–4	Comiskey Park	27,609	Recap
7	November 11	**Pittsburgh Steelers**	**W** 14–7	3–4	Connie Mack Stadium	22,652	Recap
8	November 18	**Cleveland Browns**	**L** 0–16	3–5	Connie Mack Stadium	25,894	Recap
9	November 25	San Francisco 49ers	**T** 10–10	3–5–1	Connie Mack Stadium	19,326	Recap
10	December 2	at **Cleveland Browns**	**L** 14–17	3–6–1	Cleveland Municipal Stadium	20,654	Recap
11	December 9	at **Washington Redskins**	**L** 17–19	3–7–1	Griffith Stadium	22,333	Recap
12	December 15	**New York Giants**	**L** 7–21	3–8–1	Connie Mack Stadium	16,562	Recap
Note: Intra-conference opponents are in **bold** text.

=== Standings ===
NFL Eastern Conference
	W	L	T	PCT	CONF	PF	PA	STK
New York Giants	8	3	1	.727	7–3	264	197	W1
Chicago Cardinals	7	5	0	.583	7–3	240	182	W1
Washington Redskins	6	6	0	.500	5–5	183	225	L2
Cleveland Browns	5	7	0	.417	4–6	167	177	L1
Pittsburgh Steelers	5	7	0	.417	4–6	217	250	W1
Philadelphia Eagles	3	8	1	.273	3–7	143	215	L3

Note: Tie games were not officially counted in the standings until 1972.

== Roster ==
(All time List of Philadelphia Eagles players in franchise history)

= 1956 Pro Bowl	= Hall of Famer

- + = Was a Starter in the Pro-Bowl

NO.	Player	AGE	POS	GP	GS	WT	HT	YRS	College
	Hugh Devore		COACH	_{1956 record} 3–8–1	_{Eagles; Lifetime} 3–8–1	_{NFL; Lifetime} 3–10–1		1st	University of Notre Dame
20	Bibbles Bawel	26	DB	12	0	185	6–1	4	Evansville
60	Chuck Bednarik	31	LB-C	12	0	233	6–3	7	Pennsylvania
81	Eddie Bell	25	DB-LB	12	0	212	6–1	1	Pennsylvania
33	Will Berzinski	22	HB	4	0	195	6–2	Rookie	Wisconsin-LaCrosse
36	Dick Bielski	24	E-FB	12	0	224	6–1	1	Maryland
89	John Bredice	22	E	12	0	213	6–1	Rookie	Boston University
40	Tom Brookshier	25	DB	11	0	196	6–0	3	Colorado
10	Adrian Burk	29	QB	12	3	190	6–2	6	Baylor
84	Hank Burnine	24	E	7	0	188	6–2	Rookie	Missouri
78	Marion Campbell	27	DE-DT-MG-G-T	12	0	250	6–3	2	Georgia
66	Frank D'Agostino	22	G-T	12	0	245	6–1	Rookie	Auburn
65	Tom Dimmick	25	C-T-LB	12	0	253	6–6	Rookie	Houston
27	Hal Giancanelli	27	HB	7	0	182	5–10	3	Loyola Marymount
64	Abe Gibron	31	G	2	0	243	5–11	7	_{Purdue, and Valparaiso}
63	Ken Huxhold	27	G	12	0	226	6–1	2	Wisconsin
23	Ken Keller	22	HB	11	0	180	5–10	Rookie	North Carolina
50	Bob Kelley	26	C	12	0	232	6–2	1	West Texas A&M
71	Don King	27	DE-DT	3	0	260	6–3	2	Kentucky
79	Buck Lansford	23	G-T	12	12	232	6–2	1	Texas
68	Dick Murley	23	T	5	0	247	6–0	Rookie	Purdue
68	Maury Nipp	26	G	3	0	219	6–0	4	Loyola Marymount
41	Jerry Norton	25	DB-HB	6	0	195	5–11	2	SMU
43	Jim Parmer	30	FB-HB	4	0	193	6–0	8	Oklahoma State
53	Bob Pellegrini	22	LB-G	12	0	233	6–2	Rookie	Maryland
25	Pete Retzlaff	25	E-HB-TE	10	0	211	6–1	Rookie	South Dakota State
71	Jim Ricca	29	MG-T-G-DT	1	0	270	6–4	5	Georgetown (DC)
72	Jess Richardson	26	DT	11	0	261	6–2	3	Alabama
22	Lee Riley	24	DB	9	0	192	6–1	1	Detroit Mercy
52	Wayne Robinson	26	LB-C	11	0	225	6–2	4	Minnesota
45	Rocky Ryan	24	DB-E	12	0	202	6–1	Rookie	Illinois
24	Don Schaefer	22	FB	12	0	210	6–0	Rookie	Notre Dame
82	Tom Scott	26	DE-LB	12	0	218	6–2	3	Virginia
43	Bob G. Smith	23	HB	4	0	195	5–10	1	Nebraska
80	Bill Stribling	29	E	2	0	206	6–1	5	Mississippi
11	Bobby Thomason	28	QB	12	9	196	6–1	7	VMI
83	Bobby Walston	28	E-HB-K	12	0	190	6–0	5	Georgia
77	Jim Weatherall	27	DT-T	12	12	245	6–4	1	Oklahoma
46	Ted Wegert	24	HB	7	0	202	5–11	1	none
86	Norm Willey	29	DE-G-E	9	0	224	6–2	6	Marshall
75	Frank Wydo	32	T-DT	12	0	225	6–4	9	Cornell
73	Sid Youngelman	25	DT-DE	12	0	257	6–3	1	Alabama
	41 Players; Team Average	25.8		12		218.4	6–1.3	2.6	
