= 1956 Pittsburgh Steelers season =

NFL team season

- Head coach: Walt Kiesling
- Home stadium: Forbes Field

Results
- Record: 5–7
- Division place: T–4th NFL Eastern
- Playoffs: Did not qualify

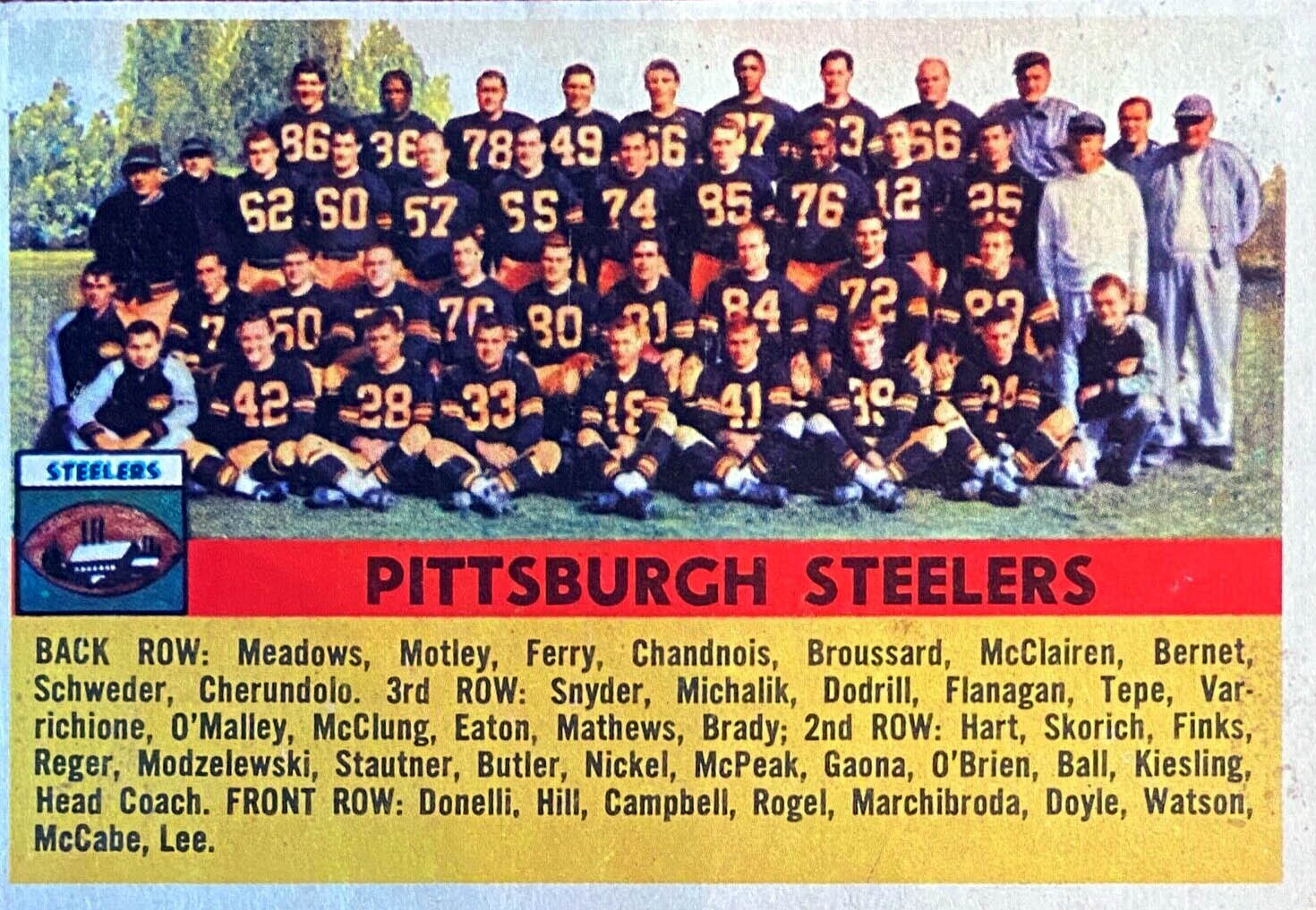

The 1956 Pittsburgh Steelers season was the franchise's 24th in the National Football League. The team made a slight improvement in their record from the previous season; they finished with a record of 5-7.

== Offseason ==
=== NFL draft ===
1956 Pittsburgh Steelers draft
Round	Pick	Player	Position	College	Notes
1	1	Gary Glick	DB	Colorado A&M	
1	5	Art Davis	DB	Mississippi State	
2	17	Joe Krupa *	DT	Purdue	
3	29	Jim Taylor	C	Baylor	
4	39	Dick Murley	T	Purdue	
5	52	Bill Murakowski	B	Purdue	
6	63	Ray Taylor	B	TCU	
7	76	Dick Gaspari	C	George Washington	
8	87	Vere Wellmen	G	Wichita	
9	100	Wayne Edmonds	G	Notre Dame	
10	111	Lou Baldacci	HB	Michigan	
10	118	Bob Nolan	E	Miami (FL)	
12	135	Phil Tarasovic	E	Yale	
13	148	Weldon Holley	B	Baylor	
14	159	Jim Emmons	T	Alabama	
16	183	Lionel Reed	B	Central State (OK)	
17	196	Bill Schmitt	G	Pittsburgh	
18	207	John Stephans	QB	Holy Cross	
19	220	Jerry Jacobs	G	Florida State	
20	231	Fred Glatz	E	Pittsburgh	
21	244	Gene Martell	T	Notre Dame	
22	255	Ray DiPasquale	B	Pittsburgh	
23	268	Pete Neft	QB	Pittsburgh	
24	279	Bryan Engram	E	TCU	
25	292	Bill O'Dell	B	Clemson	
26	303	Frank Sweeney	G	Xavier	
27	316	Buddy Benson	B	Arkansas	
28	327	Bill DeGraaf	B	Cornell	
29	340	Wes Thompson	T	Alabama	
Made roster † Pro Football Hall of Fame * Made at least one Pro Bowl during career

== Preseason ==
Week	Date	Opponent	Result	Record	Venue	Location	Attendance	Sources
1	August 17	vs. Detroit Lions	L 15–20	0–1	Glass Bowl	Toledo, OH	11,912	
2	August 25	vs. Baltimore Colts	L 16–37	0–2	Nippert Stadium	Cincinnati	12,500	
3	September 8	Chicago Bears	L 10–21	0–3	Forbes Field	Pittsburgh	22,194	
4	September 15	vs. Philadelphia Eagles	W 14–12	1–3	Metropolitan Stadium	Minneapolis	14,742	
5	September 22	vs. Los Angeles Rams	W 20–17	2–3	Multnomah Stadium	Portland, OR	20,559	

== Regular season ==
=== Schedule ===
Week	Date	Opponent	Result	Record	Venue	Attendance	Recap	Sources
1	September 30	**Washington Redskins**	**W** 30–13	1–0	Forbes Field	27,718	Recap	
2	October 6	**Cleveland Browns**	**L** 10–14	1–1	Forbes Field	35,398	Recap	
3	October 14	**Philadelphia Eagles**	**L** 21–35	1–2	Forbes Field	31,375	Recap	
4	October 21	at **New York Giants**	**L** 10–38	1–3	Yankee Stadium	48,108	Recap	
5	October 28	at **Cleveland Browns**	**W** 24–16	2–3	Cleveland Municipal Stadium	50,358	Recap	
6	November 4	**New York Giants**	**L** 14–17	2–4	Forbes Field	31,240	Recap	
7	November 11	at **Philadelphia Eagles**	**L** 7–14	2–5	Connie Mack Stadium	22,652	Recap	
8	November 18	**Chicago Cardinals**	**W** 14–7	3–5	Forbes Field	24,086	Recap	
9	November 25	at **Chicago Cardinals**	**L** 27–38	3–6	Comiskey Park	17,724	Recap	
10	December 2	Los Angeles Rams	**W** 30–13	4–6	Forbes Field	20,540	Recap	
11	December 9	at Detroit Lions	**L** 7–45	4–7	Briggs Stadium	52,124	Recap	
12	December 16	at **Washington Redskins**	**W** 23–0	5–7	Griffith Stadium	21,097	Recap	
Note: Conference opponents are in **bold** text.

== Standings ==
NFL Eastern Conference
	W	L	T	PCT	CONF	PF	PA	STK
New York Giants	8	3	1	.727	7–3	264	197	W1
Chicago Cardinals	7	5	0	.583	7–3	240	182	W1
Washington Redskins	6	6	0	.500	5–5	183	225	L2
Cleveland Browns	5	7	0	.417	4–6	167	177	L1
Pittsburgh Steelers	5	7	0	.417	4–6	217	250	W1
Philadelphia Eagles	3	8	1	.273	3–7	143	215	L3

Note: Tie games were not officially counted in the standings until 1972.

== Game summaries ==
=== Week 1 (Sunday September 30, 1956): Washington Redskins ===
	1	2	3	4	Total
Redskins	0	6	0	7	13
Steelers	7	7	9	7	30

at Forbes Field, Pittsburgh, Pennsylvania

- Game time:
- Game weather:
- Game attendance: 27,718
- Referee:
- TV announcers:

Scoring drives:

- Pittsburgh – Chandnois 2 run (Glick kick)
- Washington – FG Baker 42
- Pittsburgh – Marchibroda 1 run (Glick kick)
- Washington – FG Baker 41
- Pittsburgh – FG Glick 27
- Pittsburgh – Chandnois 17 pass from Marchibroda (kick blocked)
- Pittsburgh – Chandnois 5 run (Glick kick)
- Washington – Meilinger 13 pass from LeBaron (Baker kick)

=== Week 2 (Saturday October 6, 1956): Cleveland Browns ===
	1	2	3	4	Total
Browns	0	7	0	7	14
Steelers	0	10	0	0	10

at Forbes Field, Pittsburgh, Pennsylvania

- Game time:
- Game weather:
- Game attendance: 35,398
- Referee:
- TV announcers:

Scoring drives:

- Cleveland – Ratterman 1 run (Groza kick)
- Pittsburgh – FG Glick 30
- Pittsburgh – Chandnois 1 run (Glik kick)
- Cleveland – Modzelewski 13 run (Groza kick)

=== Week 3 (Sunday October 14, 1956): Philadelphia Eagles ===
	1	2	3	4	Total
Eagles	7	21	0	7	35
Steelers	0	0	7	14	21

at Forbes Field, Pittsburgh, Pennsylvania

- Game time:
- Game weather:
- Game attendance: 31,375
- Referee:
- TV announcers:

Scoring drives:

- Philadelphia – Schaefer 1 run (Walston kick)
- Philadelphia – Walston 51 pass from Thomason (Walston kick)
- Philadelphia – Bell 28 interception (Walston kick)
- Philadelphia – Bredice 40 pass from Thomason (Walston kick)
- Pittsburgh – Perry 15 pass from Marchibroda (Glick kick)
- Pittsburgh – Mathews 64 pass from Marchibroda (Glick kick)
- Pittsburgh – Mathews 20 pass from Marchibroda (Glick kick)
- Philadelphia – Keller 51 run (Walston kick)

=== Week 4 (Sunday October 21, 1956): New York Giants ===
	1	2	3	4	Total
Steelers	3	0	0	7	10
Giants	0	17	14	7	38

at Yankee Stadium, Bronx, New York

- Game time:
- Game weather:
- Game attendance: 48,108
- Referee:
- TV announcers:

Scoring drives:

- Pittsburgh – FG Glick 35
- New York Giants – MacAfee 14 pass from Conerly (Agajanian kick)
- New York Giants – Webster 21 pass from Conerly (Agajanian kick)
- New York Giants – FG Agajanian 14
- New York Giants – Gifford 1 run (Agajanian kick)
- New York Giants – Rote 19 pass from Conerly (Agajanian kick)
- Pittsburgh – Nickel 14 pass from Marchibroda (Glick kick)
- New York Giants – Filpski 35 run (Agajanian kick)

=== Week 5 (Sunday October 28, 1956): Cleveland Browns ===
	1	2	3	4	Total
Steelers	0	21	0	3	24
Browns	13	0	0	3	16

at Cleveland Municipal Stadium, Cleveland, Ohio

- Game time:
- Game weather:
- Game attendance: 50,358
- Referee:
- TV announcers:

Scoring drives:

- Cleveland – Lavelli 68 pass from Parilli (kick failed)
- Cleveland – Paul 35 interception (Groza kick)
- Pittsburgh – Nickel 10 pass from Marchibroda (Glick kick)
- Pittsburgh – Chandnois 1 run (Glick kick)
- Pittsburgh – Perry 75 pass from Marchibroda (Glick kick)
- Cleveland – FG Groza 28
- Pittsburgh – FG Glick 11

=== Week 6 (Sunday November 4, 1956): New York Giants ===
	1	2	3	4	Total
Giants	7	3	7	0	17
Steelers	0	0	7	7	14

at Forbes Field, Pittsburgh, Pennsylvania

- Game time:
- Game weather:
- Game attendance: 31,240
- Referee:
- TV announcers:

Scoring Drives:

- New York Giants – Webster 1 run (Agajanian kick)
- New York Giants – FG Agajanian 32
- Pittsburgh – Watson 1 run (Glick kick)
- New York Giants – Rote 3 pass from Conerly (Agajanian kick)
- Pittsburgh – Watson 6 run (Glick kick)

=== Week 7 (Sunday November 11, 1956): Philadelphia Eagles ===
	1	2	3	4	Total
Steelers	7	0	0	0	7
Eagles	7	0	7	0	14

at Connie Mack Stadium, Philadelphia, Pennsylvania

- Game time:
- Game weather:
- Game attendance: 22,652
- Referee: Jack Glascott
- TV announcers:

Scoring drives:

- Pittsburgh – Marchibroda 1 run (Glick kick)
- Philadelphia – Burnine 35 pass from Thomason (Walston kick)
- Philadelphia – Keller 1 run (Walston kick)

=== Week 8 (Sunday November 18, 1956): Chicago Cardinals ===
	1	2	3	4	Total
Cardinals	0	0	0	7	7
Steelers	7	0	7	0	14

at Forbes Field, Pittsburgh, Pennsylvania

- Game time:
- Game weather:
- Game attendance: 24,086
- Referee:
- TV announcers:

Scoring drives:

- Pittsburgh – Rogel 13 run (Glick kick)
- Pittsburgh – Butler 6 fumble run (Glick kick)
- Chicago Cardinals – Matson 45 pass from McHan (Summerall kick)

=== Week 9 (Sunday November 25, 1956): Chicago Cardinals ===
	1	2	3	4	Total
Steelers	7	0	0	20	27
Cardinals	7	17	7	7	38

at Comiskey Park, Chicago, Illinois

- Game time:
- Game weather:
- Game attendance: 17,724
- Referee:
- TV announcers:

Scoring drives:

- Chicago Cardinals – Root 3 run (Summerall kick)
- Pittsburgh – Mathews 29 pass from Marchibroda (Watson kick)
- Chicago Cardinals – Matson 1 run (Summerall kick)
- Chicago Cardinals – FG Summerall 27
- Chicago Cardinals – Matson 79 run (Summerall kick)
- Chicago Cardinals – Childress 34 pass from Root (Summerall kick)
- Pittsburgh – Ford 3 run (Watson kick)
- Pittsburgh – Nickel 4 pass from Marchibroda (kick failed)
- Chicago Cardinals – McHan 1 run (Summerall kick)
- Pittsburgh – Ford 4 run (Watson kick)

=== Week 10 (Sunday December 2, 1956): Los Angeles Rams ===
	1	2	3	4	Total
Giants	6	0	7	0	13
Steelers	7	7	0	7	21

at Forbes Field, Pittsburgh, Pennsylvania

- Game time:
- Game weather:
- Game attendance: 20,540
- Referee:
- TV announcers:

Scoring drives:

- Los Angeles – McFadin 21 fumble run (kick failed)
- Pittsburgh – Nickel 22 pass from Scarbath (Watson kick)
- Pittsburgh – FG Watson 16
- Los Angeles – Boyd 61 pass from Wade (Richter kick)
- Pittsburgh – Mathews 6 pass from Marchibroda (Watson kick)
- Pittsburgh – Rogel 1 run (Watson kick)
- Pittsburgh – Nickel 47 pass from Scarbath (kick failed)

=== Week 11 (Sunday December 9, 1956): Detroit Lions ===
	1	2	3	4	Total
Steelers	0	7	0	0	7
Lions	14	24	7	0	45

at Briggs Stadium, Detroit, Michigan

- Game time:
- Game weather:
- Game attendance: 52,124
- Referee:
- TV announcers:

Scoring drives:

- Detroit – Hart 20 pass from Layne (Layne kick)
- Detroit – Gedman 5 run (Layne kick)
- Pittsburgh – Watson 1 run (Watson kick)
- Detroit – Lary 73 interception (Layne kick)
- Detroit – Christiansen 66 punt return (Layne kick)
- Detroit – Christiansen 66 punt return (Layne kick)
- Detroit – FG Layne 13
- Detroit – Reichow 41 pass from Gilmer (Layne kick)

=== Week 12 (Sunday December 16, 1956): Washington Redskins ===
	1	2	3	4	Total
Steelers	0	7	0	16	23
Redskins	0	0	0	0	0

at Griffith Stadium, Washington, DC

- Game time:
- Game weather:
- Game attendance: 49,086
- Referee:
- TV announcers:

Scoring drives:

- Pittsburgh – Watson 1 run (Watson kick)
- Pittsburgh – Mathews 48 pass from Marchibroda (Watson kick)
- Pittsburgh – Butler 10 pass from Marchibroda (Watson kick)
- Pittsburgh – Safety, Dorow tackled by McPeak in end zone

== Roster ==
1956 Pittsburgh Steelers roster
Quarterbacks (QB): 18 Ted Marchibroda; 12 Jack Scarbath; Running backs (RB): 27 Lou Baldacci P; 33 Fran Rogel; 35 Charlie Shepard P; 39 Sid Watson K; Wide receivers (WR): 25 Ray Mathews; 87 Cy McClairen; 81 Elbie Nickel; 89 Jack O'Brien; Tight ends (TE)	Offensive linemen (OL): 55 John Cenci C; 72 Bob Gaona T; 75 Joe Krupa G/DT; 61 Marv McFadden G; 86 Bob O'Neil G/DE; 57 Jim Taylor C; 74 Frank Varrichione T; Defensive linemen (DL): 60 Dale Dodrill MG; 76 Willie McClung DT/T; 84 Bill McPeak DE; 62 Art Michalik MG/DT; 85 Joe O'Malley DE; 70 Ernie Stautner DT; 88 John Stock DE	Linebackers (LB): 56 Marv Matuszak; 50 John Reger; 53 George Tarasovic DE; Defensive backs (DB): 42 Dick Alban CB/S; 41 Fred Bruney S; 80 Jack Butler CB/S/WR; 44 Art Davis S/RB; 24 Henry Ford S/CB/RB; Special teams (ST)	Reserve: 49 Lynn Chandnois RB (IR); 26 Gary Glick CB/K (IR); -- Johnny Lattner RB (Military); 41 Lowell Perry WR (IR); Rookies in italics
