= 1956 Washington Redskins season =

NFL team season

- Owner: George Preston Marshall
- General manager: Dick McCann
- Head coach: Joe Kuharich
- Home stadium: Griffith Stadium

Results
- Record: 6–6
- Division place: 3rd NFL Eastern
- Playoffs: Did not qualify

The 1956 Washington Redskins season was the franchise's 25th season in the National Football League (NFL) and their 20th in Washington, D.C. The team failed to improve on their 8–4 record from 1955 and finished 6–6.

From the 1955 season until 1962, the Redskins were the last bastion of racial segregation in the NFL, refusing to include a single black player on their roster, unlike the other 12 teams in the league.

== Offseason ==
=== NFL draft ===
1947 Washington Redskins draft
Round	Pick	Player	Position	College	Notes
1	12	Ed Vereb	HB	Maryland	
2	24	John Paluck	DE	Pittsburgh	
3	36	Fred Wyant	QB	West Virginia	
4	41	Fran Machinsky	T	Ohio State	
5	59	Gary Lowe	DB	Michigan State	
7	83	Donnie Caraway	B	Houston	
8	94	Dick James	HB	Oregon	
9	107	Whitey Rouviere	B	Miami (FL)	
11	131	Tom Powell	G	Colgate	
12	141	Jerry Planutis	HB	Michigan State	
12	142	Gil Moreno	T	UCLA	
13	155	Jerry Ward	G	Dayton	
14	166	Pat Uebel	B	Army	
16	190	Wells Gray	G	Wisconsin	
17	203	Eagle Day	QB	Ole Miss	
18	214	Jim Pyburn	E	Auburn	
19	227	Ray Lemek	T	Notre Dame	
20	238	Vince Gonzalez	B	LSU	
21	251	Howard Schnellenberger	E	Kentucky	
22	262	George Nicula	T	Notre Dame	
23	275	Don St. John	B	Xavier	
24	286	Johnny Tatum	C	Texas	
25	299	Franklin Brooks	G	Georgia Tech	
26	310	Dave Burnham	B	Wheaton (IL)	
27	323	Royce Flippin	B	Princeton	
28	334	Billy Hicks	B	North Alabama	
29	347	Pat Bisceglia	G	Notre Dame	
30	357	Buck Nystorm	G	Michigan State	
Made roster * Made at least one Pro Bowl during career

== Preseason ==
Week	Date	Opponent	Result	Record	Venue	Attendance
1	August 17	at Los Angeles Rams	W 39–21	1–0	Los Angeles Memorial Coliseum	82,788
2	August 26	at San Francisco 49ers	L 0–20	1–1	Kezar Stadium	27,812
3	September 1	vs. Chicago Bears	L 3–17	1–2	War Memorial Stadium (Little Rock, AR)	16,000
4	September 8	vs. Green Bay Packers	W 17–10	2–2	Bowman Gray Stadium (Winston-Salem, NC)	13,500
5	September 16	at Baltimore Colts	L 13–27	2–3	Baltimore Memorial Stadium	28,471
6	September 23	vs. Detroit Lions	W 19–17	3–3	Civic Stadium (Buffalo, NY)	23,812

== Regular season ==
=== Schedule ===
Game	Date	Opponent	Result	Record	Venue	Attendance	Recap	Sources
1	September 30	at **Pittsburgh Steelers**	**L** 13–30	0–1	Forbes Field	27,718	Recap	
2	October 6	at **Philadelphia Eagles**	**L** 9–13	0–2	Connie Mack Stadium	26,607	Recap	
3	October 14	**Chicago Cardinals**	**L** 3–31	0–3	Griffith Stadium	25,794	Recap	
4	October 21	**Cleveland Browns**	**W** 20–9	1–3	Griffith Stadium	23,332	Recap	
5	October 28	at **Chicago Cardinals**	**W** 17–14	2–3	Comiskey Park	30,553	Recap	
—	Bye							
6	November 11	Detroit Lions	**W** 18–17	3–3	Griffith Stadium	28,003	Recap	
7	November 18	**New York Giants**	**W** 33–7	4–3	Griffith Stadium	26,261	Recap	
8	November 25	at **Cleveland Browns**	**W** 20–17	5–3	Cleveland Municipal Stadium	22,878	Recap	
9	December 2	at **New York Giants**	**L** 14–28	5–4	Yankee Stadium	26,261	Recap	
10	December 9	**Philadelphia Eagles**	**W** 19–17	6–4	Griffith Stadium	22,333	Recap	
11	December 16	**Pittsburgh Steelers**	**L** 0–23	6–5	Griffith Stadium	21,097	Recap	
12	December 23	at Baltimore Colts	**L** 17–19	6–6	Memorial Stadium	32,994	Recap	
Note: Intra-conference opponents are in **bold** text.

=== Standings ===
Program for the November 11 game against the Detroit Lions.

NFL Eastern Conference
	W	L	T	PCT	CONF	PF	PA	STK
New York Giants	8	3	1	.727	7–3	264	197	W1
Chicago Cardinals	7	5	0	.583	7–3	240	182	W1
Washington Redskins	6	6	0	.500	5–5	183	225	L2
Cleveland Browns	5	7	0	.417	4–6	167	177	L1
Pittsburgh Steelers	5	7	0	.417	4–6	217	250	W1
Philadelphia Eagles	3	8	1	.273	3–7	143	215	L3

Note: Tie games were not officially counted in the standings until 1972.

== Personnel ==
=== Roster ===
1956 Washington Redskins roster
Quarterbacks (QB): 16 Al Dorow; 14 Eddie LeBaron; 11 Fred Wyant; Running backs (RB): 46 Dale Atkeson; 32 Leo Elter; 47 Dick James; 25 Tom Runnels; 41 Billy Wells; Wide receivers (WR): 82 Johnny Carson; 86 Steve Meilinger; 87 Ralph Thomas; Tight ends (TE)	Offensive linemen (OL): 52 Johnny Allen C; 62 Don Boll T; 73 John Miller T/G; 70 Tony Sardisco G; 51 Jim Schrader T/C; 60 Dick Stanfel G; 67 Red Stephens G; 50 Harry Ulinski C; Defensive linemen (DL): 80 Gene Brito DE; 76 J. D. Kimmel DT; 88 Chet Ostrowski DE; 72 John Paluck DE/DT; 79 Volney Peters DT	Linebackers (LB): 36 Chuck Drazenovich MLB; 64 Bill Fulcher OLB/G; 53 LaVern Torgeson OLB; Defensive backs (DB): 21 Roy Barni CB; 27 Art DeCarlo CB; 48 Norb Hecker S; 40 Gary Lowe S/CB; 28 Joe Scudero S; Special teams (ST): 49 Sam Baker K/P/RB	Reserve: -- Tom Braatz LB (Military); 45 Ralph Felton LB (IR); -- Ralph Guglielmi QB (Military); -- Bob Ready DT (Military); -- Bert Zagers RB (Military); Rookies in italics
