= 1956 Green Bay Packers season =

NFL team season

- General manager: Verne Lewellen
- Head coach: Lisle Blackbourn
- Home stadium: City Stadium; Milwaukee County Stadium

Results
- Record: 4–8
- Division place: 5th (tied) NFL Western
- Playoffs: Did not qualify

The 1956 Green Bay Packers season was their 38th season overall and their 36th in the National Football League. Under third-year coach Lisle Blackbourn, the Packers finished at 4–8, tied for last place in the six-team Western Conference.

Notable draft picks were offensive tackles Forrest Gregg and Bob Skoronski, and quarterback Bart Starr.

This was the final season for the Packers at City Stadium at East High School; the new City Stadium (renamed Lambeau Field in 1965) debuted in September 1957.

== Offseason ==
=== NFL draft ===
Round	Pick	Player	Position	School/Club team
1	8	Jack Losch	Halfback	Miami (FL)
2	20	Forrest Gregg	Offensive Tackle	SMU
4	44	Cecil Morris	Guard	Oklahoma
5	56	Bob Skoronski	Offensive Tackle	Indiana
6	68	Bob Burris	Back	Oklahoma
7	80	Hank Gremminger	Cornerback	Baylor
8	92	Russ Dennis	End	Maryland
9	104	Gordy Duvall	Back	USC
10	116	Bob Laugherty	Back	Maryland
11	128	Mike Hudock	Center	Miami (FL)
12	140	Max Burnett	Back	Arizona
13	152	Jim Mense	Center	Notre Dame
14	164	Charlie Thomas	Back	Wisconsin
15	176	Buddy Alliston	Guard	Ole Miss
16	188	Curtis Lynch	Tackle	Alabama
17	200	Bart Starr	Quarterback	Alabama
18	212	Stan Intihar	End	Cornell
19	224	Ken Vakey	End	Texas Tech
20	236	Clyde Letbetter	Tackle	Baylor
21	248	Hal O'Brien	Back	SMU
22	260	Johnny Popson	Back	Furman
23	272	Jesse Birchfield	Guard	Duke
24	284	Don Wilson	Center	Rice
25	296	Franz Koenecke	End	Minnesota
26	308	Dick Goehe	Tackle	Ole Miss
27	320	Dick Kolian	End	Wisconsin
28	332	Bobby Lance	Quarterback	Florida
29	344	Vester Newcomb	Center	Southwest Junior College
30	355	Rod Hermes	Quarterback	Beloit

- Green indicates a future Pro Football Hall of Fame inductee
- Yellow indicates a future Pro Bowl selection

== Regular season ==
=== Schedule ===
Week	Date	Opponent	Result	Record	Venue	Attendance	Recap
1	September 30	**Detroit Lions**	**L** 16–20	0–1	City Stadium	24,668	Recap
2	October 7	**Chicago Bears**	**L** 21–37	0–2	City Stadium	24,668	Recap
3	October 14	**Baltimore Colts**	**W** 38–33	1–2	Milwaukee County Stadium	24,214	Recap
4	October 21	**Los Angeles Rams**	**W** 42–17	2–2	Milwaukee County Stadium	24,200	Recap
5	October 28	at **Baltimore Colts**	**L** 21–28	2–3	Memorial Stadium	40,086	Recap
6	November 4	Cleveland Browns	**L** 7–24	2–4	Milwaukee County Stadium	28,590	Recap
7	November 11	at **Chicago Bears**	**L** 14–38	2–5	Wrigley Field	49,172	Recap
8	November 18	**San Francisco 49ers**	**L** 16–17	2–6	City Stadium	17,986	Recap
9	November 22	at **Detroit Lions**	**W** 24–20	3–6	Briggs Stadium	54,087	Recap
10	December 2	at Chicago Cardinals	**W** 24–21	4–6	Comiskey Park	22,620	Recap
11	December 8	at **San Francisco 49ers**	**L** 20–38	4–7	Kezar Stadium	32,433	Recap
12	December 16	at **Los Angeles Rams**	**L** 21–49	4–8	Los Angeles Memorial Coliseum	45,209	Recap
Note: Intra-conference opponents are in **bold** text.

=== Standings ===
NFL Western Conference
	W	L	T	PCT	CONF	PF	PA	STK
Chicago Bears	9	2	1	.818	8–2	363	246	W2
Detroit Lions	9	3	0	.750	8–2	300	188	L1
San Francisco 49ers	5	6	1	.455	5–5	233	284	W3
Baltimore Colts	5	7	0	.417	3–7	270	322	W1
Los Angeles Rams	4	8	0	.333	3–7	291	307	W2
Green Bay Packers	4	8	0	.333	3–7	264	342	L2

Note: Tie games were not officially counted in the standings until 1972.

== Roster ==
1956 Green Bay Packers final roster
Quarterbacks: 18 Tobin Rote; 15 Bart Starr; Running backs: 48 Al Carmichael; 31 Fred Cone K; 37 Howie Ferguson; 40 Joe Johnson; 25 Jack Losch; 22 Bill Roberts; Receivers: 86 Billy Howton; 84 Gary Knafelc	Offensive linemen: 62 Buddy Brown G; 51 Jim Ringo C; 77 John Sandusky T; 63 Joe Skibinski G; 76 Bob Skoronski T; 61 Jerry Smith G/C; 68 Len Szafaryn G; Defensive linemen: 87 Nate Borden DE; 79 Dave Hanner DT; 72 Jerry Helluin DT; 81 Gene Knutson DE/DT; 83 John Martinkovic DE	Linebackers: 65 Tom Bettis OLB; 69 Bill Forester MLB; 66 Deral Teteak OLB; 74 Roger Zatkoff OLB; Defensive backs: 20 Billy Bookout CB; 44 Bobby Dillon S; 26 Ken Gorgal CB; 46 Hank Gremminger CB; 47 Val Joe Walker S; Special teams: 80 Dick Deschaine P	Reserve list: -- Al Barry G (Military); -- Hank Bullough G (Military); -- Bobby Garrett QB (Military); 75 Forrest Gregg G/T (Military); 58 Larry Lauer C (IR); -- Max McGee WR/P (Military); -- Doyle Nix CB (Military); -- Veryl Switzer RB/CB (Military); -- Jim Temp DE (Military); -- Gene White CB (Military); Rookies in italics

== Awards and records ==
- Tobin Rote, NFL Leader, Touchdown Passes, (18)
