= 1956 Cleveland Browns season =

NFL team season

- Head coach: Paul Brown
- Home stadium: Cleveland Stadium

Results
- Record: 5–7
- Division place: T-4th Eastern
- Playoffs: Did not qualify
- Pro Bowlers: Don Paul, CB; Walt Michaels, LB; Frank Gatski, C Pete Brewster, LE; Mike McCormack, OT

The 1956 Cleveland Browns season was the team's eleventh season, and seventh season with the National Football League.

This was the first season in which the Browns missed the playoffs, and its first season with a losing record. The Browns lost seven games in 1956, after having lost a total of only 17 over the previous ten seasons combined. They were also the last two time defending champion to not score more than 30 points in a game until the 2024 Kansas City Chiefs.

== Exhibition schedule ==
Game	Date	Opponent	Result	Venue	Attendance	Sources
1	August 10	vs. College All-Stars at Chicago	W 26–0		75,000	
2	August 19	at San Francisco 49ers	L 17–28		38,741	
3	August 24	at Los Angeles Rams	L 6–17		40,175	
4	September 1	Green Bay Packers	L 20–21		15,456	
5	September 7	at Detroit Lions	L 0–17		48,105	
6	September 15	vs. Detroit Lions at Akron	L 14–31		28,201	
7	September 21	at Chicago Bears	W 24–14		56,543	

== Regular season ==
=== Schedule ===
Week	Date	Opponent	Result	Record	Venue	Attendance	Recap	Sources
1	September 30	at **Chicago Cardinals**	**L** 7–9	0–1	Comiskey Park	20,966	Recap	
2	October 6	at **Pittsburgh Steelers**	**W** 14–10	1–1	Forbes Field	35,398	Recap	
3	October 14	**New York Giants**	**L** 9–21	1–2	Cleveland Municipal Stadium	60,042	Recap	
4	October 21	at **Washington Redskins**	**L** 9–20	1–3	Griffith Stadium	23,322	Recap	
5	October 28	**Pittsburgh Steelers**	**L** 16–24	1–4	Cleveland Municipal Stadium	50,358	Recap	
6	November 4	at Green Bay Packers	**W** 24–7	2–4	Milwaukee County Stadium	28,590	Recap	
7	November 11	Baltimore Colts	**L** 7–21	2–5	Cleveland Municipal Stadium	42,404	Recap	
8	November 18	at **Philadelphia Eagles**	**W** 16–0	3–5	Connie Mack Stadium	25,894	Recap	
9	November 25	**Washington Redskins**	**L** 17–20	3–6	Cleveland Municipal Stadium	22,878	Recap	
10	December 2	**Philadelphia Eagles**	**W** 17–14	4–6	Cleveland Municipal Stadium	20,645	Recap	
11	December 9	at **New York Giants**	**W** 24–7	5–6	Yankee Stadium	27,707	Recap	
12	December 16	**Chicago Cardinals**	**L** 7–24	5–7	Cleveland Municipal Stadium	25,312	Recap	
Note: Intra-conference opponents are in **bold** text.

.

=== Season recap ===
==== Week 1 at Chicago ====
The post Otto Graham era begins with a 9-7 loss to the Cardinals in Chicago. Cleveland's only score comes on a 46-yard touchdown pass from George Ratterman to Ray Renfro in the first quarter. But Pat Summerall's third field goal, a nine-yarder with 29 seconds remaining, won it for the Cardinals and broke a twelve-game losing streak to the Browns. The Cardinals later won the season finale.

=== Standings ===
Program for the November 11 game against the Baltimore Colts.

NFL Eastern Conference
	W	L	T	PCT	CONF	PF	PA	STK
New York Giants	8	3	1	.727	7–3	264	197	W1
Chicago Cardinals	7	5	0	.583	7–3	240	182	W1
Washington Redskins	6	6	0	.500	5–5	183	225	L2
Cleveland Browns	5	7	0	.417	4–6	167	177	L1
Pittsburgh Steelers	5	7	0	.417	4–6	217	250	W1
Philadelphia Eagles	3	8	1	.273	3–7	143	215	L3

Note: Tie games were not officially counted in the standings until 1972.

== Roster ==
1956 Cleveland Browns roster
Quarterbacks: 15 Tommy O'Connell; 18 Babe Parilli; Running backs: 30 Maurice Bassett; 40 Preston Carpenter; 36 Billy Kinard; 32 Fred Morrison P; 26 Ray Renfro WR; Receivers: 88 Pete Brewster; 86 Dante Lavelli	Offensive linemen: 60 Harold Bradley G; 62 Herschel Forester G; 52 Frank Gatski C; 64 Donald Goss T; 76 Lou Groza T/K; 78 Art Hunter C/T; 69 John Macerelli T/G; 74 Mike McCormack T; Defensive linemen: 70 Don Colo DT; 80 Len Ford DE; 79 Bob Gain DE/DT; 72 John Kissell DT; 82 Carlton Massey DE; 84 Jim Ray Smith DE	Linebackers: 35 Galen Fiss OLB; 34 Walt Michaels MLB; 65 Chuck Noll OLB; 50 Sam Palumbo OLB/C; Defensive backs: 22 Ken Konz S; 24 Warren Lahr CB; 20 Don Paul CB; 44 John Petitbon S; 42 Junior Wren S	Reserve list: -- Tom Catlin LB (Military); -- Vince Costello LB (IR); -- Willie Davis DE (Military); -- Chet Hanulak RB (Military); 36 Ed Modzelewski RB (IR); 16 George Ratterman QB (IR); -- Billy Reynolds RB (Military); rookies in italics
