= Jim Harness =

American football player (born 1934)

No. 20
- Position: Defensive back

Personal information
- Born: April 6, 1934; Dyersburg, Tennessee, U.S.
- Died: May 26, 2015 (aged 81); Brunswick, Georgia, U.S.
- Listed height: 5 ft 11 in (1.80 m)
- Listed weight: 180 lb (82 kg)

Career information
- High school: Central (AR)
- College: Mississippi State (1952–1955)
- NFL draft: 1956: 21st round, 247th overall pick

Career history
- Baltimore Colts (1956)

Career NFL statistics
- Games played: 1
- Stats at Pro Football Reference

James Harness (April 6, 1934 – May 26, 2015) was an American professional football player who played for Baltimore Colts of the National Football League (NFL). He played college football at Mississippi State University.

Harness died on May 26, 2015, at the age of 81.
