= Bobby Fox (American football) =

American football player and coach (1934–1986)

Biographical details
- Born: September 9, 1934
- Died: 1986

Playing career
- 1952–1955: Texas A&M–Commerce
- Position: Quarterback

Coaching career (HC unless noted)
- 1971–1982: Texas A&M–Commerce (DC)
- 1983–1984: Tarleton State

Head coaching record
- Overall: 8–12
- Bowls: 0–1

Robert Melton Fox (September 9, 1934 – 1986) was an American football player and coach.

== Career ==
A quarterback at Texas A&M University–Commerce, he was drafted 283rd overall in the 24th round by the Baltimore Colts in the 1956 NFL draft. Fox served as the head football coach at Tarleton State University from 1983 to 1984, compiling a record of 8–12.

== Head coaching record ==
Year	Team	Overall	Conference	Standing	Bowl/playoffs
Tarleton State Texans (Texas Intercollegiate Athletic Association) (1983–1984)
1983	Tarleton State	2–7	1–5	4th	
1984	Tarleton State	6–5	4–2	2nd	L Aztec
Tarleton State:		8–12	5–7		
Total:		8–12			
