= M. L. Brackett =

American football player (1933–2015)

No. 73, 63, 71
- Positions: Defensive end, defensive tackle, linebacker

Personal information
- Born: July 4, 1933; Attalla, Alabama, U.S.
- Died: June 30, 2015 (aged 81); Gadsden, Alabama, U.S.
- Listed height: 6 ft 5 in (1.96 m)
- Listed weight: 248 lb (112 kg)

Career information
- High school: Etowah (Attalla)
- College: Auburn (1952–1955)
- NFL draft: 1956: 2nd round, 22nd overall pick

Career history
- Chicago Bears (1956–1957); New York Giants (1958)

Career NFL statistics
- Fumble recoveries: 2
- Interceptions: 1
- Stats at Pro Football Reference

M. L. Brackett (July 4, 1933 – June 30, 2015) was an American professional football player who played for the Chicago Bears and New York Giants. He played college football at the Auburn University, having previously attended Etowah High School.
