= Dick Klawitter =

American football player (1929–1977)

No. 54
- Position: Center

Personal information
- Born: June 29, 1929; Chicago, Illinois, U.S.
- Died: December 11, 1977 (aged 48); Waterloo, Iowa, U.S.
- Listed height: 6 ft 7 in (2.01 m)
- Listed weight: 270 lb (122 kg)

Career information
- High school: Bowen (Chicago)
- College: South Dakota State (1952–1955)
- NFL draft: 1956: 8th round, 95th overall pick

Career history
- Chicago Bears (1956)

Career NFL statistics
- Games played: 5
- Games started: 1
- Stats at Pro Football Reference

Dick Klawitter (June 29, 1929 – December 11, 1977) was an American professional football center. He played for the Chicago Bears in 1956.
