= John McMullan =

American football player (1933–1994)

No. 68
- Position: Guard

Personal information
- Born: June 28, 1933; New York City, U.S.
- Died: April 1, 1994 (aged 60)
- Listed height: 6 ft 0 in (1.83 m)
- Listed weight: 245 lb (111 kg)

Career information
- College: Notre Dame
- NFL draft: 1956: 14th round, 165th overall pick

Career history

Playing
- New York Titans (1960–1961); Jersey / Jersey City Giants (1963-1964)

Coaching
- Jersey Giants (1964) Assistant

Career AFL statistics
- Games played: 28
- Games started: 26
- Stats at Pro Football Reference

John McMullan (June 28, 1933 – April 1, 1994) was an American professional football guard who played two seasons with the New York Titans of the American Football League (AFL) He was selected in the 14th round of the 1956 NFL draft. He played college football at Notre Dame
