= John Jankans =

American gridiron football player (1932–2018)

- Jankans as Co-Captain of the Red Knights, Reading High School, Pennsylvania, Fall 1951

Profile
- Positions: Tackle, Guard, Linebacker

Personal information
- Born: October 3, 1932; Reading, Pennsylvania, U.S.
- Died: July 8, 2018 (aged 85); Compton, California, U.S.
- Listed height: 6 ft 2 in (1.88 m)
- Listed weight: 220 lb (100 kg)

Career information
- High school: Reading (PA)
- College: Arizona State
- NFL draft: 1956: 11th round, 130th overall pick

Career history
- 1956–1957: BC Lions

John Jankans (October 3, 1932 - July 8, 2018) was an American professional football player who played for the BC Lions. He played high school football at Reading Senior High School alongside future Pro Football Hall of Fame inductee Lenny Moore. He played college football at Arizona State University, where he had an impressive amateur career.

== Early life ==
John Jankans was born in Reading, Pennsylvania, on October 3, 1932. He attended Reading High School, where he played football under head coach Andy Stopper. His main position was left tackle. The right halfback on the team was Lenny Moore. Jankans and Moore were two of a handful of African-American players on the team. According to Moore, in his autobiography, when it came to the football field, Andy Stopper "was totally 'color blind.' He wanted us all to succeed. . . . On Coach Stopper's field, we were rewarded by our speed and agility, not by our ancestry."

In the fall of 1949, during his sophomore year, he made the varsity team line-up of the Red Knights, whereas Lenny Moore was junior varsity. The team had seven wins, two losses, and one tie for the season. It marked the first time in the school's history that they won a championship. They were co-champions of the Central Penn Conference, which they shared with Steelton High School, who were the sole winners of the 1948 conference. For the 1950 season, the Red Knights went five and five. Jankans played during every game that season, and was on the starting lineup for many of the games.

During his senior year, Jankans co-captained the Red Knights, along with quarterback Eddie Albright. That fall of 1951, the team finished with a record of nine wins and one defeat. Unfortunately, that one loss to Williamsport High School (a 21-16 defeat) dashed the Red Knights' chances of winning the Central Penn Conference that season, and they ended up placing second. Although Lenny Moore went on to win the Astor Trophy award, which designated him as the team's most valuable player, Jankans was voted "Best Athlete" by his classmates for the 1951-52 school year.

Jankans graduated from Reading High School in June 1952. In 2011, he was inducted into the Berks County Football Coaches Association (BCFCA) Hall of Fame.

== College career ==
Jankans attended Arizona State University from 1952 to 1956. During this period, Jankans earned the distinction of being the only player in ASU history to earn First-Team All-Conference honors in all four years he played. He is also the only player to have that distinction in the history of the Border Conference. He was named one of the best 54 players in the history of the school, and he is considered the greatest two-way lineman the school ever had. In 1981, he was inducted into the Arizona State Sun Devils Hall of Fame.

== Professional career ==
Upon graduating from Arizona State in 1956, Jankans was drafted by the Chicago Bears in the 11th round, 130th overall, as an end. However, he ended up playing for the British Columbia Lions as a guard and linebacker in 1956 and 1957.

== Death ==
John Jankans died on July 8, 2018, in Compton, California, USA.
