= Tom Adams (Canadian football) =

Gridiron football player (born 1934)

Profile
- Position: End

Personal information
- Born: April 26, 1934 (age 92)
- Listed height: 6 ft 2 in (1.88 m)
- Listed weight: 218 lb (99 kg)

Career information
- College: UCLA
- NFL draft: 1956: 17th round, 202nd overall pick

Career history
- 1956: Ottawa Rough Riders

Tom Adams (born April 26, 1934) was an American football end who played for the Ottawa Rough Riders of the Canadian Football League (CFL). He was selected in the 17th round of the 1956 NFL draft by the Chicago Bears with the 202nd overall pick, but never played for the Bears.
