= Milt Graham =

American gridiron football player (1934–2021)

No. 61, 69, 65, 70
- Positions: Tackle, Defensive tackle

Personal information
- Born: July 28, 1934; Chatham, Massachusetts, U.S.
- Died: December 13, 2021 (aged 87); Norwalk, Connecticut, U.S.
- Listed height: 6 ft 6 in (1.98 m)
- Listed weight: 235 lb (107 kg)

Career information
- High school: Rensselaer (Rensselaer, New York)
- College: Colgate (1953–1955)
- NFL draft: 1956: 14th round, 167th overall pick

Career history
- Ottawa Rough Riders (1956–1961); Boston Patriots (1961–1963)

Awards and highlights
- Grey Cup champion (1960)

Career AFL statistics
- Games played: 28
- Games started: 25
- Stats at Pro Football Reference

Milton Russell Graham (July 28, 1934 – December 13, 2021) was an American and Canadian football player who played for the Ottawa Rough Riders. He won the Grey Cup with Ottawa in 1960. Graham played college football at Colgate University and was drafted in the 1956 NFL draft by the Chicago Bears (Round 14, #167). He also played basketball at Colgate, after which he was also drafted in the 13th round of the 1956 NBA draft by the Syracuse Nationals (now Philadelphia 76ers), but focused on football instead. He later played in American Football League for the Boston Patriots.
