= Bill Roberts (American football) =

American football player (1929–2007)

No. 22
- Position: Halfback

Personal information
- Born: September 11, 1929; Dubuque, Iowa
- Died: August 15, 2007 (aged 77); Edina, Minnesota
- Listed height: 6 ft 0 in (1.83 m)
- Listed weight: 200 lb (91 kg)

Career information
- College: Dartmouth

Career history
- Green Bay Packers (1956)

Career NFL statistics
- Receptions: 1
- Receiving yards: 14
- Stats at Pro Football Reference

William Roberts (September 11, 1929 – August 15, 2007) was a halfback in the National Football League. He played with the Green Bay Packers during the 1956 NFL season.
