= Fred Glatz =

American football player (born 1933)

No. 83
- Position: End

Personal information
- Born: July 31, 1933 (age 93); Pittsburgh, Pennsylvania, U.S.
- Listed height: 6 ft 1 in (1.85 m)
- Listed weight: 200 lb (91 kg)

Career information
- High school: Central Catholic (Pittsburgh)
- College: Pittsburgh
- NFL draft: 1956: 20th round, 231st overall pick

Career history
- Pittsburgh Steelers (1956)

Career NFL statistics
- Punts: 25
- Punting yards: 984
- Longest punt: 60
- Stats at Pro Football Reference

Fred Joseph Glatz (born July 31, 1933) is an American former professional football player who was an end for the Pittsburgh Steelers of the National Football League (NFL). He played college football for the Pittsburgh Panthers.

He served as head coach at St. John's Prep in Danvers, MA from 1967 through 1983, compiling a record of 105–41–7.
