= Paul Goad =

American football player (1934–1978)

No. 36, 90
- Position: Fullback

Personal information
- Born: September 7, 1934; Cincinnati, Ohio, U.S.
- Died: November 29, 1978 (aged 44); Little Rock, Arkansas, U.S.
- Listed height: 6 ft 0 in (1.83 m)
- Listed weight: 195 lb (88 kg)

Career information
- High school: Little Rock Central
- College: Vanderbilt; Abilene Christian
- NFL draft: 1956: 25th round, 291st overall pick

Career history
- San Francisco 49ers (1956); BC Lions (1957)

Career NFL statistics
- Return yards: 18
- Stats at Pro Football Reference

Paul Goad (September 7, 1934 – November 29, 1978) was an American professional football fullback. He was selected by the San Francisco 49ers in the 25th round (291st overall) of the 1956 NFL Draft. He played for the San Francisco 49ers in 1956.
