= Bill Herchman =

American football player (1933–2009)

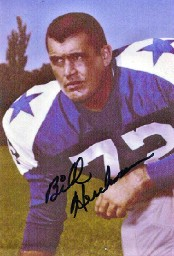

No. 72, 73
- Position: Defensive tackle

Personal information
- Born: March 10, 1933; Vernon, Texas, U.S.
- Died: January 22, 2009 (aged 75); Arlington, Texas, U.S.
- Listed height: 6 ft 2 in (1.88 m)
- Listed weight: 246 lb (112 kg)

Career information
- High school: Vernon; Lubbock (Lubbock, Texas)
- College: Tyler Junior College (1952–1953); Texas Tech (1954–1955)
- NFL draft: 1956: 3rd round, 26th overall pick

Career history
- San Francisco 49ers (1956–1959); Dallas Cowboys (1960–1961); Houston Oilers (1962)

Career NFL/AFL statistics
- Fumble recoveries: 8
- Interceptions: 1
- Sacks: 1
- Stats at Pro Football Reference

William E. Herchman (March 10, 1933 – January 22, 2009) was an American professional football defensive tackle in the National Football League (NFL) and American Football League (AFL). Herchman played for the San Francisco 49ers and Dallas Cowboys of the NFL, and the Houston Oilers of the AFL. His playing career ended prior to the merger of the two leagues in 1970. He played college football at Texas Technological College (now Texas Tech University) and was selected by the 49ers in the third round of the 1956 NFL draft.

== Early life ==
Herchman attended Vernon High School before moving on to Tyler Junior College. After his sophomore year he transferred to Texas Technological College.

In 1997, he was inducted into the Tyler Junior College Circle of Honor.

== Professional career ==
=== San Francisco 49ers ===
Herchman was selected by the San Francisco 49ers in the third round (26th overall) of the 1956 NFL draft. In 1957, he returned a 54-yard interception for a touchdown against the Chicago Bears.

He started every game for four seasons at right defensive tackle. On June 30, 1960, he was traded to the Dallas Cowboys in exchange for a fourth round draft choice (#46-Charlie Sieminski) .

=== Dallas Cowboys ===
In 1960, Herchman was a part of the Dallas Cowboys inaugural season and was a backup to Ed Husmann at defensive tackle. He registered 51 tackles and had one fumble recovery.

The next year, he was named the starter at right defensive tackle. He was released on September 11, 1962.

=== Houston Oilers ===
In the 1962, Herchman played 12 games for the Houston Oilers of the American Football League.

== Personal life ==
Herchman married Janis Lee Hargrove and they had four children, Randy, Terry, Kathy and Missy. He worked in concrete sales for 42 years.
