= 1956 Detroit Lions season =

NFL team season

- Head coach: Buddy Parker
- Home stadium: Briggs Stadium

Results
- Record: 9–3
- Division place: 2nd NFL Western
- Playoffs: Did not qualify

The 1956 Detroit Lions season was their 27th in the league. The team improved on their previous season's output of 3–9, winning nine games. Despite the improvement, they missed the playoffs for the second consecutive season.

Detroit held the top spot by a half game in the Western Conference entering the final game of the season against the Chicago Bears at Wrigley Field, which the Lions lost, 38–21. After completing a handoff early in the second quarter, Detroit quarterback Bobby Layne was concussed and removed from the game, due to an unsportsmanlike conduct foul by Ed Meadows, for which Meadows was ejected.

The following season, the Lions won the Western Conference and the NFL championship, their third of the decade. The Lions won the NFL title in 1952 and 1953, and were runners-up in 1954.

== Schedule ==
According to the team, a total of 36,586 season tickets were sold by the Lions for the 1956 campaign. The Lions played their home games in Briggs Stadium (Tiger Stadium), which had a regular listed seating capacity of 46,194, with an additional 7,000 bleacher seats for football to bring total capacity to 53,194.

| Week | Date | Opponent | Result | Record | Venue | Attendance | Recap |
|---|---|---|---|---|---|---|---|
| 1 | September 30 | at **Green Bay Packers** | **W** 20–16 | 1–0 | City Stadium | 24,668 | Recap |
| 2 | October 6 | at **Baltimore Colts** | **W** 31–14 | 2–0 | Memorial Stadium | 42,622 | Recap |
| 3 | October 14 | **Los Angeles Rams** | **W** 24–21 | 3–0 | Briggs Stadium | 56,281 | Recap |
| 4 | October 21 | **San Francisco 49ers** | **W** 20–17 | 4–0 | Briggs Stadium | 55,662 | Recap |
| 5 | October 28 | at **Los Angeles Rams** | **W** 16–7 | 5–0 | Los Angeles Memorial Coliseum | 76,758 | Recap |
| 6 | November 4 | at **San Francisco 49ers** | **W** 17–13 | 6–0 | Kezar Stadium | 46,708 | Recap |
| 7 | November 11 | at Washington Redskins | **L** 17–18 | 6–1 | Griffith Stadium | 28,003 | Recap |
| 8 | November 18 | **Baltimore Colts** | **W** 27–3 | 7–1 | Briggs Stadium | 55,788 | Recap |
| 9 | November 22 | **Green Bay Packers** | **L** 20–24 | 7–2 | Briggs Stadium | 54,087 | Recap |
| 10 | December 2 | **Chicago Bears** | **W** 42–10 | 8–2 | Briggs Stadium | 57,024 | Recap |
| 11 | December 9 | Pittsburgh Steelers | **W** 45–7 | 9–2 | Briggs Stadium | 52,124 | Recap |
| 12 | December 16 | at **Chicago Bears** | **L** 21–38 | 9–3 | Wrigley Field | 49,086 | Recap |
Note: Intra-conference opponents are in **bold** text.

== Standings ==
NFL Western Conference
| | W | L | T | PCT | CONF | PF | PA | STK |
|---|---|---|---|---|---|---|---|---|
| Chicago Bears | 9 | 2 | 1 | .818 | 8–2 | 363 | 246 | W2 |
| Detroit Lions | 9 | 3 | 0 | .750 | 8–2 | 300 | 188 | L1 |
| San Francisco 49ers | 5 | 6 | 1 | .455 | 5–5 | 233 | 284 | W3 |
| Baltimore Colts | 5 | 7 | 0 | .417 | 3–7 | 270 | 322 | W1 |
| Los Angeles Rams | 4 | 8 | 0 | .333 | 3–7 | 291 | 307 | W2 |
| Green Bay Packers | 4 | 8 | 0 | .333 | 3–7 | 264 | 342 | L2 |

Note: Tie games were not officially counted in the standings until 1972.

== Roster ==
1956 Detroit Lions roster
| Quarterbacks (QB): 12 Harry Gilmer; 22 Bobby Layne K; Running backs (RB): 33 Bill Bowman; 40 Howard Cassady; 26 Gene Gedman; 23 Jug Girard P; 82 Leon Hart; 42 Don McIlhenny; 30 Tom Tracy; Wide receivers (WR): 87 Dorne Dibble; 83 Jim Doran; 84 Dave Middleton; 15 Jerry Reichow QB; Tight ends (TE) | Offensive linemen (OL): 50 Charlie Ane C; 67 Stan Campbell G; 76 Lou Creekmur T; 57 Bob Lusk C; 51 Jim Salsbury G/C; 66 Harley Sewell G; 75 Ollie Spencer T; Defensive linemen (DL): 68 Gene Cronin DE; 70 Ray Krouse DT; 72 Gil Mains DE; 78 Darris McCord DE; 74 Bob Miller DT; 79 Gerry Perry DT | Linebackers (LB): 85 Sonny Gandee OLB; 86 Bob Long OLB; 47 Jim Martin OLB/K; 56 Joe Schmidt MLB; Defensive backs (DB): 24 Jack Christiansen S; 25 Jim David CB; 21 Carl Karilivacz CB; 28 Yale Lary S; 20 Bill Stits CB/RB; Special teams (ST) | Reserve: 34 Lew Carpenter RB (Military); Rookies in italics |
