= Don Schaefer =

American football player (1934–2019)

No. 24, 96
- Position: Fullback

Personal information
- Born: February 13, 1934; Pittsburgh, Pennsylvania, U.S.
- Died: January 20, 2019 (aged 84); Bethel Park, Pennsylvania, U.S.
- Listed height: 6 ft 0 in (1.83 m)
- Listed weight: 185 lb (84 kg)

Career information
- High school: Central Catholic (Pittsburgh)
- College: Notre Dame
- NFL draft: 1956: 3rd round, 28th overall pick

Career history
- Philadelphia Eagles (1956); Hamilton Tiger-Cats (1959)

Awards and highlights
- First-team All-American (1955)

Career NFL statistics
- Rushing yards: 320
- Rushing average: 3.1
- Receptions: 13
- Receiving yards: 117
- Total touchdowns: 2
- Stats at Pro Football Reference

Donald Thomas Schaefer (February 13, 1934 – January 20, 2019) was an American professional football player. He was a first-team All-American fullback at Notre Dame in 1955.

Schaefer was born in Pittsburgh. He attended Pittsburgh Central Catholic High School. He then enrolled at the University of Notre Dame where he played college football at the fullback position for the Notre Dame Fighting Irish football team from 1953 to 1955. He was selected by the American Football Coaches Association, the Football Writers Association of America, the International News Service and the Central Press Association as a first-team player on their respective 1955 College Football All-America Teams.

Schaefer was selected by the Philadelphia Eagles in the third round (28th overall pick) of the 1956 NFL draft and appeared in 12 games for the Eagles during the 1956 NFL season. He then served 30 months in the United States Air Force and played one season in the Canadian Football League for the Hamilton Tiger-Cats. After retiring from football, he worked for Canteen Corporation in Chicago and Wyckoff, New Jersey.
