= Johnny Hermann =

American football player and coach (born 1933)

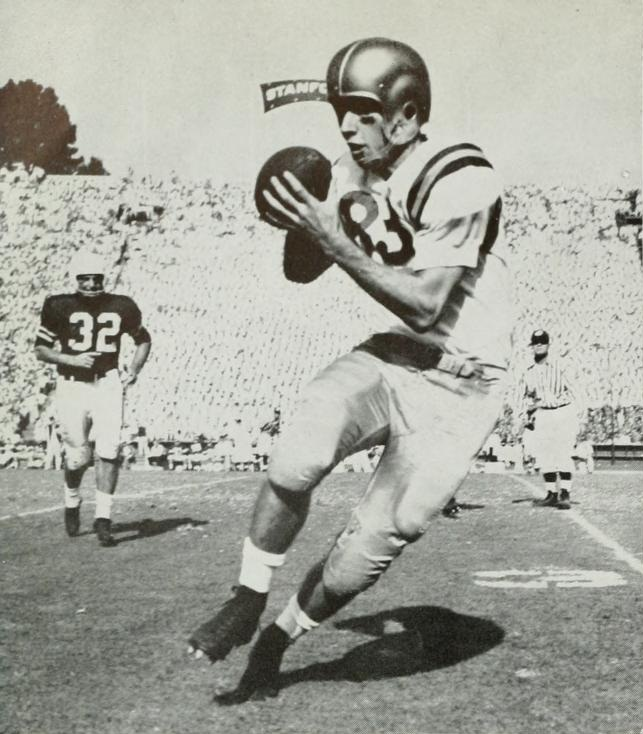
- Hermann from 1956 UCLA yearbook

No. 41, 20
- Position: Defensive back

Personal information
- Born: October 17, 1933 (age 93); San Fernando, California, U.S.
- Listed height: 6 ft 1 in (1.85 m)
- Listed weight: 180 lb (82 kg)

Career information
- High school: San Fernando
- College: UCLA
- NFL draft: 1956: 10th round, 117th overall pick

Career history

Playing
- New York Giants (1956); Baltimore Colts (1956)

Coaching
- UCLA (1959-1962) Freshmen; UCLA (1963-1964) Quarterbacks / tight ends; Compton (1965) Head coach; Cal State Los Angeles (1966) Backfield

Awards and highlights
- NFL champion (1956)

Career NFL statistics
- Return yards: 17
- Stats at Pro Football Reference

Head coaching record
- Regular season: 1–8–0 (.111)

John William Hermann (born October 17, 1933) is an American former football player and coach. Hermann played running back, tight end, and defensive back under coach Red Sanders with the UCLA Bruins football from 1953 to 1955.

Hermann was selected by the New York Giants of the National Football League (NFL) in the 10th round of the 1956 NFL draft with the 117th overall pick. He played two games for the Giants before being cut. He signed two weeks later by the Baltimore Colts and finished the year with them.

In 1959, Hermann joined the UCLA coaching staff as the head coach of the freshman football team. He also coached the Bruins quarterbacks, tight ends, and running backs until the end of the 1964 season when he was dismissed by incoming head coach Tommy Prothro. Hermann was the head football coach at Compton College for one season, in 1965 before joining the coaching staff at California State College at Los Angeles—now known as California State University, Los Angeles—in 1966 as backfield coach under Homer Beatty.

== Head coaching record ==
Year	Team	Overall	Conference	Standing	Bowl/playoffs
Compton Tartars (Western State Conference) (1965)
1965	Compton	1–8	0–7	8th	
Compton:		1–8	0–7		
Total:		1–8			
