= Vester Newcomb =

American football player and coach (1932–2009)

Biographical details
- Born: July 14, 1932; Calhoun City, Mississippi, U.S.
- Died: October 6, 2009 (aged 77); Summit, Mississippi, U.S.

Playing career
- 1954–1955: SW Jr. College (MS)
- 1956–1957: Miami (FL)
- Position: Center

Coaching career (HC unless noted)
- 1964–1965: Liberty HS (SC)
- 1966–1968: Columbia HS (SC)
- 1969–1970: Miami (FL) (assistant)
- 1978–1979: Tennessee–Martin

Head coaching record
- Overall: 7–13 (college)

Vester Newcomb (July 14, 1932 – October 6, 2009) was an American football player and coach. He was selected by the Green Bay Packers in the 1956 NFL draft, but opted instead to continue his playing career at the University of Miami. Newcomb served as the head football coach at the University of Tennessee at Martin from 1978 to 1979, compiling a record of 7–13.
