= Jerry Gustafson =

American football player

No. 95
- Position: Quarterback

Personal information
- Born: 1934 (age 91–92)
- Listed height: 6 ft 1 in (1.85 m)
- Listed weight: 210 lb (95 kg)

Career information
- High school: Astoria (Astoria, Oregon)
- College: Stanford (1952–1955)
- NFL draft: 1956: 27th round, 315th overall pick

Career history
- 1956: San Francisco 49ers*
- 1956: BC Lions
- * Offseason or practice squad member only

Career CFL statistics
- Passing comp: 79
- Passing att: 178
- Passing yards: 1,214
- Passing TDs: 11

Jerry F. Gustafson (born 1934) is an American former professional football player who was a quarterback for one season with the BC Lions of the Western Interprovincial Football Union (WIFU). He was selected by the San Francisco 49ers in the 27th round of the 1956 NFL draft after playing college football for the Stanford Indians (now Cardinal).

== Early life and college ==
Jerry F. Gustafson was born in 1934. He played high school football at Astoria High School in Astoria, Oregon. He completed 27 of 66 passes for six touchdowns his junior year in 1950 as the team finished 7–2. Gustafson threw 15 touchdowns as a senior in 1951, leading the team to 11 straight wins and a playoff loss. He also played basketball in high school, helping Astoria advance to two consecutive state tournaments. He was a team captain in basketball his senior season. Gustafson graduated from Astoria High in 1952. He was later inducted into the school's athletics hall of fame.

Gustafson initially planned to attend the University of Washington but ended up switching to Stanford University, where he played college football for the Stanford Indians. He was on the freshman team in 1952 and was a three-year letterman from 1953 to 1955. He was mostly a backup during his time at Stanford, but split time with John Brodie as a senior in 1955.

== Professional career ==
Gustafson was selected by the San Francisco 49ers in the 27th round, with the 315th overall pick, of the 1956 NFL draft. He was waived by the 49ers on August 23, 1956.

Gustafson signed with the BC Lions of the Western Interprovincial Football Union on September 5, 1956. On September 8, he made his Lions debut, and first start, scoring two passing touchdowns and one rushing touchdown in a 45–15 victory over the Calgary Stampeders. Overall, he played in ten games (all starts) for the Lions during the 1956 season, completing 79 of 178 passes (44.4%) for 1,214 yards, 11 touchdowns, and 17 interceptions while also scoring three rushing touchdowns. In December 1956, it was reported that Gustafson would not be back as he had joined the United States Army.

== Personal life ==
Gustafson was married to fellow Astoria High graduate Marilyn Jean Gustafson for 67 years until she died in 2022.
