= Jesse Castete =

American football player (1933–2014)

No. 22, 23
- Position: Defensive back

Personal information
- Born: September 3, 1933; Saint Landry, Louisiana, U.S.
- Died: August 29, 2014 (aged 80); Sulphur, Louisiana, U.S.
- Listed height: 5 ft 11 in (1.80 m)
- Listed weight: 180 lb (82 kg)

Career information
- High school: Lake Charles (LA) Marion
- College: McNeese State
- NFL draft: 1956: 24th round, 287th overall pick

Career history
- Chicago Bears (1956); Los Angeles Rams (1956–1957)

Career NFL statistics
- Interceptions: 2
- Stats at Pro Football Reference

Jesse Castete (September 3, 1933 – August 29, 2014) was an American professional football defensive back. He played for the Chicago Bears in 1956 and for the Los Angeles Rams from 1956 to 1957.

He died on August 29, 2014, in Sulphur, Louisiana at age 80.
