= John Bredice =

American football player (1934–1997)

No. 89
- Position: End

Personal information
- Born: June 23, 1934; Waterbury, Connecticut, U.S.
- Died: October 1, 1997 (aged 63); Los Angeles County, California, U.S.
- Listed height: 6 ft 1 in (1.85 m)
- Listed weight: 213 lb (97 kg)

Career information
- High school: West Haven (CT) Notre Dame
- College: Boston University
- NFL draft: 1956: 9th round, 102nd overall pick

Career history
- Philadelphia Eagles (1956); New York Titans (1960)*
- * Offseason or practice squad member only

Career NFL statistics
- Receptions: 10
- Receiving yards: 146
- Touchdowns: 1
- Stats at Pro Football Reference

John Bredice (June 23, 1934 – October 1, 1997) was an American professional football end. He was selected by the Philadelphia Eagles in the ninth round (102nd overall) of the 1956 NFL draft. He played for the Eagles in 1956.
