= Jerry Zaleski =

Canadian football player (1932–2022)

Profile
- Position: Halfback

Personal information
- Born: September 14, 1932; Chicago, Illinois, U.S.
- Died: July 19, 2022 (aged 89); Colorado Springs, Colorado, U.S.
- Listed height: 5 ft 10 in (1.78 m)
- Listed weight: 190 lb (86 kg)

Career information
- College: Colorado State
- NFL draft: 1956: 10th round, 112th overall pick

Career history
- 1957: Hamilton Tiger-Cats

Awards and highlights
- Grey Cup champion (1957)

Gerald Stanley Zaleski (September 14, 1932 – July 19, 2022) was an American professional football player who played for the Hamilton Tiger-Cats. He won the Grey Cup with them in 1957. He played college football at Colorado State University.
