= 1956 Baltimore Colts season =

4th season in franchise history

- Owner: Carroll Rosenbloom
- General manager: Don "Red" Kellett
- Head coach: Weeb Ewbank
- Home stadium: Memorial Stadium

Results
- Record: 5–7
- Division place: 4th NFL Western
- Playoffs: Did not qualify

The 1956 Baltimore Colts season marked the fourth year for the second Baltimore Colts franchise in the National Football League (NFL). Under third-year head coach Weeb Ewbank, the Colts posted a record of 5 wins and 7 losses, fourth in the Western Conference. This is also the first season to feature future Hall of Famers Johnny Unitas and Lenny Moore.

== Regular season ==
=== Schedule ===
Game	Date	Opponent	Result	Record	Venue	Attendance	Recap	Sources
1	September 30	**Chicago Bears**	**W** 28–21	1–0	Memorial Stadium	45,221	Recap	
2	October 6	**Detroit Lions**	**L** 14–31	1–1	Memorial Stadium	42,622	Recap	
3	October 14	at **Green Bay Packers**	**L** 33–38	1–2	Milwaukee County Stadium	24,214	Recap	
4	October 21	at **Chicago Bears**	**L** 27–58	1–3	Wrigley Field	48,364	Recap	
5	October 28	**Green Bay Packers**	**W** 28–21	2–3	Memorial Stadium	40,086	Recap	
—	Bye							
6	November 11	at Cleveland Browns	**W** 21–7	3–3	Cleveland Stadium	42,404	Recap	
7	November 18	at **Detroit Lions**	**L** 3–27	3–4	Briggs Stadium	55,788	Recap	
8	November 25	**Los Angeles Rams**	**W** 56–21	4–4	Memorial Stadium	40,321	Recap	
9	December 2	**San Francisco 49ers**	**L** 17–20	4–5	Memorial Stadium	37,227	Recap	
10	December 9	at **Los Angeles Rams**	**L** 7–31	4–6	L.A. Memorial Coliseum	51,037	Recap	
11	December 16	at **San Francisco 49ers**	**L** 17–30	4–7	Kezar Stadium	43,791	Recap	
12	December 23	Washington Redskins	**W** 19–17	5–7	Memorial Stadium	32,944	Recap	
Note: Intra-conference opponents are in **bold** text.

== Standings ==
NFL Western Conference
	W	L	T	PCT	CONF	PF	PA	STK
Chicago Bears	9	2	1	.818	8–2	363	246	W2
Detroit Lions	9	3	0	.750	8–2	300	188	L1
San Francisco 49ers	5	6	1	.455	5–5	233	284	W3
Baltimore Colts	5	7	0	.417	3–7	270	322	W1
Los Angeles Rams	4	8	0	.333	3–7	291	307	W2
Green Bay Packers	4	8	0	.333	3–7	264	342	L2

Note: Tie games were not officially counted in the standings until 1972.

== Roster ==
Official team photo for the 1956 Baltimore Colts.

1956 Baltimore Colts roster
Quarterbacks: 18 Gary Kerkorian; 14 George Shaw; 19 Johnny Unitas; Running backs: 35 Alan Ameche; 45 L. G. Dupre; 24 Lenny Moore; 26 Royce Womble; 21 Billy Vessels CB; 31 Dick Young; Receivers: 82 Raymond Berry; 84 Jim Mutscheller	Offensive linemen: 79 Tom Feamster T/K; 74 Ken Jackson T/G; 65 Bill Koman G/LB; 50 Buzz Nutter C; 60 George Preas T; 53 George Radosevich C/T; 68 Alex Sandusky G; 63 Art Spinney G; Defensive linemen: 73 Joe Campanella MG; 70 Art Donovan DT; 77 Tom Finnin DT; 83 Don Joyce DE; 76 Gene Lipscomb DT; 89 Gino Marchetti DE; 61 Jack Patera MG	Linebackers: 67 Doug Eggers; 65 Bill Pellington; Defensive backs: 20 Johnny Hermann S; 44 Bert Rechichar S/K/P; 25 Don Shula CB; 23 Carl Taseff CB; 40 Jesse Thomas S	Reserve list: 78 Dick Chorovich T (IR); -- Cotton Davidson QB/P (Military); 18 Dick Nyers S (IR); 52 Dick Szymanski C (Military); rookies in italics

== See also ==
- History of the Indianapolis Colts
