= John Stock (American football) =

American football player (1933–2023)

No. 88
- Position: End

Personal information
- Born: March 7, 1933; Weirton, West Virginia, U.S.
- Died: August 7, 2023 (aged 90)
- Listed height: 6 ft 2 in (1.88 m)
- Listed weight: 210 lb (95 kg)

Career information
- High school: Scott Twp. (PA)
- College: Pittsburgh

Career history
- Pittsburgh Steelers (1956)

Career statistics
- Games played: 2
- Stats at Pro Football Reference

John Harvey Stock (March 7, 1933 – August 7, 2023) was an American professional football player who was an end for the Pittsburgh Steelers of the National Football League (NFL). He played college football for the Pittsburgh Panthers.

Stock died in Doylestown, Pennsylvania on August 7, 2023, at the age of 90.
