= Bob Lusk =

American football player (1932-2022)

No. 57
- Position: Center

Personal information
- Born: May 18, 1932; Williamson, West Virginia, U.S.
- Died: October 26, 2022 (aged 90); Saline, Michigan, U.S.
- Listed height: 6 ft 1 in (1.85 m)
- Listed weight: 222 lb (101 kg)

Career information
- High school: Williamson
- College: William & Mary (1950–1952, 1955)
- NFL draft: 1956: 6th round, 62nd overall pick

Career history
- Detroit Lions (1956); Philadelphia Eagles (1957)*
- * Offseason or practice squad member only

Career NFL statistics
- Games played: 5
- Stats at Pro Football Reference

Robert Arlen Lusk (May 18, 1932 – October 26, 2022) was an American professional football player who was a center for the Detroit Lions of the National Football League (NFL). He played in five games in the 1956 season after his collegiate career at William & Mary. Lusk died in Saline, Michigan on October 26, 2022, at the age of 90.
