= L.C. Joyner =

American football player (1933–2006)

No. 46
- Positions: Halfback, cornerback

Personal information
- Born: July 2, 1933; Canton, Mississippi, U.S.
- Died: February 10, 2006 (aged 72); Santa Clara, California, U.S.
- Listed height: 6 ft 1 in (1.85 m)
- Listed weight: 187 lb (85 kg)

Career information
- High school: Pittsburgh High School (California)
- College: Diablo Valley College
- NFL draft: 1956: 21st round, 243rd overall pick

Career history
- San Francisco 49ers (1956)*; Oakland Raiders (1960)
- * Offseason or practice squad member only
- Stats at Pro Football Reference

Larry Cleopha Joyner (July 2, 1933 – February 10, 2006) was a professional American football Halfback in the National Football League (NFL) and Cornerback in the American Football League (AFL). He was drafted by the NFL's San Francisco 49ers in 1956 and played for the AFL's Oakland Raiders during their inaugural season.
