= Tom Dimmick =

American gridiron football player (1931–2023)

No. 65, 44, 55
- Positions: Center, tackle, linebacker

Personal information
- Born: May 1, 1931; Opelousas, Louisiana, U.S.
- Died: April 3, 2023 (aged 91); Opelousas, Louisiana, U.S.
- Listed height: 6 ft 6 in (1.98 m)
- Listed weight: 253 lb (115 kg)

Career information
- College: Houston
- NFL draft: 1956: 10th round, 113th overall pick

Career history
- Philadelphia Eagles (1956); Hamilton Tiger-Cats (1957); Boston Patriots (1960)*; Dallas Texans (1960)
- * Offseason or practice squad member only

Awards and highlights
- Grey Cup champion (1957)

Career NFL/AFL statistics
- Games played: 25
- Games started: 7
- Stats at Pro Football Reference

Thomas Evans Dimmick (May 1, 1931 – April 3, 2023) was an American and Canadian football player who played for the Hamilton Tiger-Cats, Philadelphia Eagles and Dallas Texans. He won the Grey Cup with Hamilton in 1957. He played college football University of Houston and was drafted in the 1956 NFL draft by the Eagles (Round 10, #113 overall). He started off his career with them in 1956 before going to Hamilton to play for the 1957 season. He then played for Dallas in the American Football League (AFL) in 1960. Dimmick died on April 3, 2023, at the age of 91.
