= Tommy Runnels =

American football player (1934–2012)

No. 25
- Position: Halfback

Personal information
- Born: January 28, 1934; Fort Worth, Texas, U.S.
- Died: April 7, 2012 (aged 78); Granbury, Texas, U.S.
- Listed height: 5 ft 10 in (1.78 m)
- Listed weight: 187 lb (85 kg)

Career information
- High school: North Side (Fort Worth)
- College: North Texas (1951–1955)
- NFL draft: 1956: 14th round, 168th overall pick

Career history
- Los Angeles Rams (1956)*; Washington Redskins (1956–1957)
- * Offseason or practice squad member only

Career NFL statistics
- Rushing yards: 386
- Rushing average: 3.3
- Receptions: 7
- Receiving yards: 60
- Total touchdowns: 1
- Stats at Pro Football Reference

Melvin Thomas Runnels (January 28, 1934 – April 7, 2012) was an American professional football halfback in the National Football League (NFL) for the Washington Redskins. He played college football at the University of North Texas and was drafted in the 14th round of the 1956 NFL draft by the Los Angeles Rams. He was born in Fort Worth, Texas and died in Granbury, Texas.
