= Gary Glick =

American football player (1930–2015)

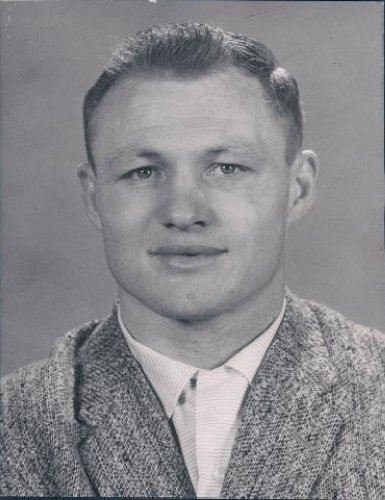
- Glick in 1958

No. 26, 21, 47, 43
- Positions: Safety, halfback

Personal information
- Born: May 14, 1930; Grant, Nebraska, U.S.
- Died: February 11, 2015 (aged 84); Fort Collins, Colorado, U.S.
- Listed height: 6 ft 2 in (1.88 m)
- Listed weight: 195 lb (88 kg)

Career information
- High school: La Porte (CO)
- College: Colorado State (1952–1955)
- NFL draft: 1956: 1st round, 1st overall pick

Career history

Playing
- Pittsburgh Steelers (1956–1959); Washington Redskins (1959–1960); Baltimore Colts (1961); San Diego Chargers (1963)

Coaching
- Denver Broncos (1962) Defensive backs coach; Norfolk Neptunes (1965–1967) Head coach; Montreal Alouettes (1968) Assistant coach; Norfolk Neptunes (1969) Co-head coach

Awards and highlights
- AFL champion (1963); Second-team All-American (1955); Colorado State University Athletics Hall of Fame

Career NFL/AFL statistics
- Interceptions: 14
- Fumble recoveries: 12
- Field goals made: 9
- Field goal attempts: 25
- Field goal %: 36
- Stats at Pro Football Reference

Gary Galen Glick (May 14, 1930 – February 11, 2015) was an American professional football player who was a safety, cornerback and placekicker for six seasons in the National Football League (NFL) before he concluded his career in the American Football League (AFL) for one season, where he won the 1963 AFL championship with the San Diego Chargers. He was the first overall selection in the 1956 NFL draft. To date, Glick is still the only defensive back ever to be picked first overall in any NFL draft.

== Early life ==
Glick was born on May 14, 1930, in Grant, Nebraska. The family moved to Colorado not long after, and Glick grew up in a dairy farm in Laporte, Colorado, near Fort Collins, Colorado. He graduated from Cache la Poudre High School before entering the United States Navy in 1948, seeing service in the Korean War along with playing service football, basketball and softball. He cited his service as one that honed his skills as a player, as he went from roughly 160 pounds as a high school graduate to over 190 when he left the Navy. He spent four years in the Navy, and played three years of football (1949 to 1951) for the Alameda Naval Air Station Hellcats. Glick was the Navy's Athlete of the Year in 1952.

While in the Navy, he played in exhibition football games against NFL players. His play drew the attention of Bob Davis, head coach of Colorado State College of Agricultural and Mechanic Arts (then known as Colorado A&M and later Colorado State University), located in Fort Collins.

== College career ==
Glick elected to play near home with the Colorado A&M Rams (also known as the Aggies). He was a two-way player on the football team. In addition to defensive back, he also starred at quarterback and linebacker and served as a place-kicker for the Rams. He was one of four Glick brothers that played football for the Rams (Ivan, Leon, and Fred), with each receiving letters in football. Glick graduated with Bachelor of Arts (1956) and master’s degrees (1959) in physical education.

Glick led the team in rushing and scoring in 1954. On defense, Glick recorded eight interceptions in 1954, among his fourteen career interceptions at Colorado A&M, both records at the time. The career total record has since been surpassed, but the season record of eight is still a team record. In 1954, his eight interceptions was the best in college football. He also holds the school record for pass completion percentage in a game as a quarterback; going 12 of 14 (87.5%) against Utah State on October 23, 1954.

The highlight of the team's and Glick's 1954 season was his last-minute game-tying touchdown run against the University of Utah, which had won the Skyline Conference title the last three seasons. He also kicked the game-winning extra point after that touchdown run. Glick scored all 14 Rams points in the 14–13 victory. Glick had earlier blocked a Utah extra point attempt, which gave his team the one point-margin of victory.

In 1955, Glick led the team in rushing (579 yards) and touchdowns (eight), and was second on the team in passing yards. His 66 total points led the Skyline Conference in scoring, with 15 extra points and one field goal in addition to the eight touchdowns. He led A&M (as coached by Bob Davis in his final season) to the Skyline Conference title, with a 6–1 conference record and 8–2 overall record, with Davis named the conference's Coach of the Year. The Rams' conference title was the Rams' last one for 39 years, until the Colorado State Rams won the Western Athletic Conference title in 1994.

In the last game of the 1955 season, the Rams clinched the title with a 10-0 victory over the University of Colorado. Glick scored all 10 points. He had a rushing touchdown, after which he kicked the extra point, and a field goal. The two Colorado teams’ rivalry went back to 1892, and this was A&M’s first victory against Colorado in the 1950s. The only other Rams' win that decade against Colorado would come in 1958, behind his brother Fred Glick, the last game in the schools’ rivalry until the 1980s.

The Associated Press (AP) named Glick second-team All-American in 1955. He was also an Academic All-American in 1955. Glick was selected first-team All-Skyline Conference by the AP. In November 1955, his teammates elected him honorary captain for 1955. Glick played in the Hula Bowl, the Blue Gray Game and the Chicago College All-Star Game.

== Professional career ==
=== 1956 NFL draft ===
In 1956, the Pittsburgh Steelers had won the first overall pick by way of bonus pick determined by lottery, and they also had the fifth pick in the first round. The Steelers used the bonus pick to make Glick the first overall selection in the draft. Glick's selection was viewed by many as a surprise, and Glick himself was surprised.

Steelers' coach Walt Kiesling explained on draft day in November 1955 that Glick's selection was based upon the team's desire to address a weakness in their defensive backfield. Kiesling also said at the time that Glick's ability to play offense as well as defense was important, stating that Glick could play quarterback if the need arose. Kiesling said Glick was highly recommended by all who had observed him. Colorado A&M coach Bob Davis praised the selection of his player, observing that it was difficult to find good defensive backs. When questioned about selecting the little-known Glick with the first pick and not with a later pick, Kiesling said "We really wanted to wait for his regular turn in the draft. We really wanted him and I was afraid someone else would grab him".

It was reported in the Pittsburgh media at the time of the draft that all of the Steelers first four draft choices, who included Glick, were "personally scouted by members of the Steeler staff" before their selection. Nearly a year later, it was reported that Keisling had selected Glick "sight unseen" and one "who came highly recommended to the Steelers by Western observers". Dan M. Rooney, the son of then Steelers' owner Art Rooney and a Steelers' executive (and future owner) later said that he had wanted the team to draft quarterback Earl Morrall, but the team was concerned about its weak defensive secondary. Rooney said the Steelers did not scout Glick, which was not uncommon in the 1950s. Rather the team would look at records and newspaper articles, and then contact a player's coach. In Glick's case, the Steelers did a little film study and talked to Bob Davis. Davis had coached a number of good defensive players over the years, and told the Steelers Glick was the best defensive player he had ever coached. Rooney reported that Davis had written a series of letters to Kiesling encouraging the Steelers to select Glick in the draft saying, among other things, "Never in my entire coaching career was I as high on a player as I am on Gary. He simply can’t miss in the pro league".

In Dan Rooney's book on his lifelong experience with the Steelers, he wrote that he told Kiesling that Glick was a "sleeper", and so there was no need to pick him with the bonus selection since none of the other teams knew anything about Glick and would not take him early in the draft. Rooney told Kiesling if Kiesling really wanted Glick the Steelers would select him, but they could do it in the third round. Rooney pointed out that the Steelers did not really know much about Glick either: "We don't have film, nobody's seen him, all we've got is a letter from a coach we never heard of". Kiesling responded "No, this guy is good and everybody is going to know about him. Everybody will want him!" Art Rooney believed the coach had to be given the ultimate decision in this situation, and so the Steelers drafted Glick.

Among the players drafted later in the 1956 draft were future Hall of Fame legends such as Lenny Moore (1st round, 9th pick), Forrest Gregg (2nd round, 20th pick) and Sam Huff (3rd round, 30th pick). At the time, the question was why the Steelers chose Glick over No. 2 pick quarterback Morrall and No. 3 pick running back Howard "Hopalong" Cassady; which Kiesling addressed by identifying players the Steelers already had that he believed could do the job at those positions (including Jim Finks at quarterback). It also was observed at the time that the overall selection pattern among all teams in the draft was not to select the more well-known All-Americans in the early rounds; and only four first-team All-Americans were taken out of the 37 players drafted in the first three rounds.

=== Pittsburgh Steelers ===
The Steelers utilized Glick as a kicker in his first two seasons. As a rookie, the team bought him a special set of kicking shoes, the cost of which was deducted from his paycheck. During his rookie season (1956), the 26-year old Glick was a two-way player and kicker for the Steelers. He played receiver, running back, linebacker, cornerback and safety that season; but was chiefly a kicker and defensive back. He started eight games in 1956 (in a 12-game season), making four field goals in seven attempts. He also made 16 extra points in 17 attempts. Glick also recovered two fumbles. He missed the season's final four games with a fractured cheekbone.

The Steelers finished the 1956 season 5–7, and Kiesling was replaced before the 1957 season by Buddy Parker as head coach. Ironically, before the 1957 season started, the Steelers traded linebacker Marv Matuszak and their 1958 and 1959 first round draft picks to the San Francisco 49ers for Morrall, because Parker believed the team desperately needed a quarterback.

In 1957, Glick started nine games. Glick was 5–of–18 in his second and final year kicking field goals, and made 10 extra points in 12 attempts. He also played some as a reserve defensive back, and he recorded two interceptions that season. Glick also had five fumble recoveries that season. In 1958, he started all 12 Steelers' games. He had two interceptions and three fumble recoveries, with one being for a touchdown on a 36- or 37-yard return of a Frank Gifford fumble in a victory against the New York Giants.

In a September 1959 exhibition game, Steelers quarterback Bobby Layne threw touchdown passes of 51 and 40 yards to Glick. He was a reserve defensive back with the Steelers through two games of the 1959 season. At the end of September, Glick was traded to the Washington Redskins for a high draft choice.

In four years with the Steelers, Glick started 29 games, with four interceptions and 10 fumble recoveries.

=== Washington Redskins, Baltimore Colts, San Diego Chargers ===
In 1959, Glick started nine games for Washington, playing right cornerback. He recorded two interceptions. In 1960, he started three games, with three interceptions and a fumble recovery for a touchdown against the St. Louis Cardinals in a November game.

Washington waived Glick in 1961, and a few days later he signed with the Baltimore Colts for the 1961 season. He started eight games with the Colts, playing right cornerback. He had a career-high four interceptions in his one season with the club, with three occurring in a game against Washington on November 26, setting a team record. The Colts had a diamond ring made for Glick to honor his accomplishment in that game. Glick became friendly with Colts' Hall of Fame quarterback Johnny Unitas, who would visit Glick's home over the years.

In 1962, Glick took a job with the Denver Broncos to coach the defensive backfield while recovering from an ankle injury. He returned to pro football as a player in 1963, and played his last season with the San Diego Chargers. The Chargers originally cut Glick at the end of August, but he was added to the Chargers roster at the end of October. He started three games for the Chargers at safety. He faced his brother Fred's Houston Oilers on December 1 and 15, the Chargers winning both games. Glick recorded the final interception of his career against Houston on December 1. Over a month later, the Chargers won the AFL Championship Game, with Glick retiring a winner in his final game. He was the starting free safety in that championship game.

== Coaching and scouting career ==
In 1962, Glick stopped playing in the NFL because of an ankle injury, and became a coach with the AFL's Denver Broncos; before returning to play the following season. In 1965, he was hired as head coach of the Norfolk Neptunes of the Continental Football League. He coached the team for three seasons from 1965 to 1967, and again in the 1969 season (as co-head coach with George Hughes), twice winning coach of the year honors (1967 and 1969), and going 38–18 or 36–18 in those four seasons. In 1968, he served as the offensive coordinator of the Montreal Alouettes of the Canadian Football League.

He was hired by Upton Bell as a scout for the Baltimore Colts in 1970, who won Super Bowl V. He then became a scout for the New England Patriots the following year. In February 1972, he was hired as an offensive backfield coach to work under head coach Bob Weber at the University of Arizona. Glick and Weber were teammates at Colorado State. He coached for one season at Arizona. Jack Butler, head of the BLESTO scouting service (now known as the NFL Scouting Combine), and former Steeler teammate, offered Glick a position as a West Coast scout, but Glick declined; wanting to return to a business he ran with his brother Fred in Fort Collins and to raise his children there.

It has also been said that Glick served as an offensive coordinator at the University of Arizona before becoming a scout in the 1970s. He would scout for the Baltimore Colts, the New England Patriots and the Canadian Football League before retiring in 1985. It is also reported that his coaching and scouting career after the end of his playing career lasted 14 years, but that he retired as a Canadian Football League scout in 1985.

== Legacy and honors ==
In 1956, Colorado State University presented Glick with the Nye Trophy, given to the school's top senior athlete. His brother Fred won the same award in 1959. Glick was among the inaugural inductees of the Colorado State University Athletics Hall of Fame in 1988. He also was inducted into the Colorado Sports Hall of Fame in 1992. His brother Fred, who also played in professional football, joined him in the Colorado State University Athletics Hall of Fame in 1991.

Glick is the only defensive back taken with the first overall NFL draft pick, and the only player from a Colorado college or university to be taken with the first overall pick. Despite his misgivings about drafting Glick so high, Dan Rooney did consider Glick a "good player" for the Steelers. Glick considered himself a "pretty good defensive back" on a "pretty good defense" in Pittsburgh, but realized many fans considered him a bust because "When you are the first person picked in the draft, everybody expects you to come in and turn things around". Well after his playing career was over, he said "Football was good to me and I couldn't have asked for a better person to work for than Mr. (Art) Rooney. I can't complain about the way things have turned out".

== Personal life and death ==
After retiring from professional football altogether, Glick owned businesses in Fort Collins, including DLG Construction (which he founded with his brother Fred and two friends from high school), and Glick's Elk Horn Motel. He also owned a parking-lot service in Greeley, Colorado.

After his playing and coaching years ended, Glick was involved with the Easter Seals of Colorado and the NFL Alumni Chapter of Denver. Glick became an avid softball player in his later years, winning the Senior Softball World Championships in 1995 and 2006.

Glick died on February 11, 2015, at the age of 84, at his home in Fort Collins, Colorado, following a stroke. He was survived by his wife of 63 years and their three children. HIs wife Colleen died the following year.

After Glick's death, his family sent Glick's brain to Boston University to be evaluated for chronic traumatic encephalopathy (CTE), and the test results found Glick had CTE. Each of his three children received a settlement of about $14,000 in connection with a class action concussion lawsuit against the NFL.
