= 1956 Los Angeles Rams season =

NFL team season

- Head coach: Sid Gillman
- Home stadium: Los Angeles Memorial Coliseum

Results
- Record: 4–8
- Division place: T-5th NFL Western
- Playoffs: Did not qualify

Uniform
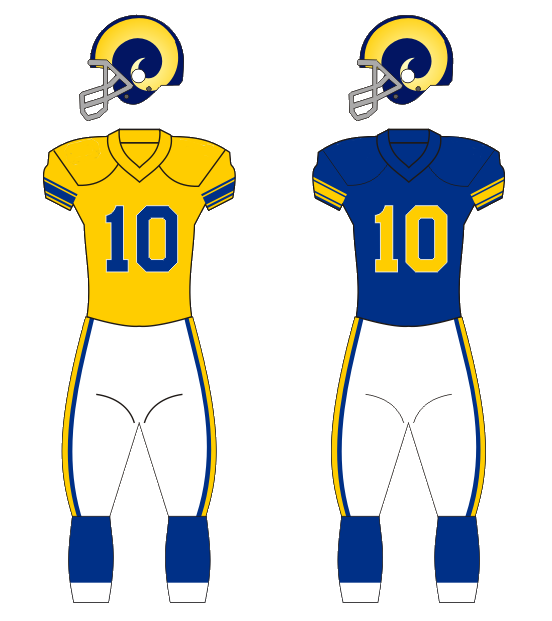

The 1956 Los Angeles Rams season was the team's 19th year with the National Football League and the 11th season in Los Angeles.

== Transactions ==
- July 27, 1956: Andy Robustelli was traded from the Los Angeles Rams to the New York Giants in exchange for the Giants First Round selection.

== Schedule ==
Week	Date	Opponent	Result	Record	Venue	Attendance	Recap
1	September 30	Philadelphia Eagles	**W** 27–7	1–0	Los Angeles Memorial Coliseum	54,412	Recap
2	October 7	at **San Francisco 49ers**	**L** 30–33	1–1	Kezar Stadium	54,589	Recap
3	October 14	at **Detroit Lions**	**L** 21–24	1–2	Briggs Stadium	56,281	Recap
4	October 21	at **Green Bay Packers**	**L** 17–42	1–3	Milwaukee County Stadium	24,200	Recap
5	October 28	**Detroit Lions**	**L** 7–16	1–4	Los Angeles Memorial Coliseum	76,758	Recap
6	November 4	**Chicago Bears**	**L** 24–35	1–5	Los Angeles Memorial Coliseum	69,894	Recap
7	November 11	**San Francisco 49ers**	**W** 30–6	2–5	Los Angeles Memorial Coliseum	69,828	Recap
8	November 18	at **Chicago Bears**	**L** 21–30	2–6	Wrigley Field	48,102	Recap
9	November 25	at **Baltimore Colts**	**L** 21–56	2–7	Memorial Stadium	40,321	Recap
10	December 2	at Pittsburgh Steelers	**L** 13–30	2–8	Forbes Field	20,450	Recap
11	December 9	**Baltimore Colts**	**W** 31–7	3–8	Los Angeles Memorial Coliseum	51,037	Recap
12	December 16	**Green Bay Packers**	**W** 49–21	4–8	Los Angeles Memorial Coliseum	45,209	Recap
Note: Intra-conference opponents are in **bold** text.

=== Standings ===
NFL Western Conference
	W	L	T	PCT	CONF	PF	PA	STK
Chicago Bears	9	2	1	.818	8–2	363	246	W2
Detroit Lions	9	3	0	.750	8–2	300	188	L1
San Francisco 49ers	5	6	1	.455	5–5	233	284	W3
Baltimore Colts	5	7	0	.417	3–7	270	322	W1
Los Angeles Rams	4	8	0	.333	3–7	291	307	W2
Green Bay Packers	4	8	0	.333	3–7	264	342	L2

Note: Tie games were not officially counted in the standings until 1972.

== Final roster ==
1956 Los Angeles Rams roster
Quarterbacks (QB): 10 Rudy Bukich; 11 Norm Van Brocklin P; 9 Bill Wade; Running backs (RB): 34 Joe Marconi; 28 Brad Myers; 27 Ron Waller; 37 Tommy Wilson; 35 Tank Younger; Wide receivers (WR): 82 Bob Boyd; 88 Bob Carey; 84 Leon Clarke; 40 Elroy Hirsch; 89 Ron Miller; Tight ends (TE)	Offensive linemen (OL): 75 Bob Fry T; 63 John Hock G; 79 Glenn Holtzman T; 51 John Morrow C/G; 73 Ken Panfil T/DT; 61 Duane Putnam G; Defensive linemen (DL): 68 Sid Fournet MG/DE; 65 Art Hauser DT; 62 Bud McFadin DT/K; 81 Paul Miller DE; 83 Duane Wardlow DE	Linebackers (LB): 50 Dick Daugherty C; 58 Bob Griffin MG; 48 Les Richter MG/K; Defensive backs (DB): 25 Don Burroughs S; 41 Jim Cason CB; 23 Jesse Castete S; 43 Will Sherman S; 22 Rex Shiver CB; 44 Jesse Whittenton CB; Special teams (ST)	Reserve: -- A. D. Williams WR (Military); -- Charlie Sticka RB (IR); 60 Jack Ellena MG (IR); 80 Tom Fears WR/K (Retired); 71 Frank Fuller DE/DT/MG (IR); -- Edward Kelley CB (Military); 31 Larry Morris LB (IR); 56 Hugh Pitts LB (IR); 70 Charlie Toogood T (IR); Rookies in italics
