= List of Vanderbilt Commodores football seasons =

Season results for the Vanderbilt University football team since 1890

This is a list of seasons completed by the Vanderbilt Commodores college football team since its inception in 1890.

== Seasons ==
Year	Coach	Overall	Conference	Standing	Bowl/playoffs	Coaches^{#}	AP^{°}
Elliott Jones (Independent) (1890–1892)
1890	Vanderbilt	1–0					
1891	Vanderbilt	3–1					
1892	Vanderbilt	4–4					
W. J. Keller (Independent) (1893)
1893	Vanderbilt	6–1					
Henry Worth Thornton (Independent) (1894)
1894	Vanderbilt	7–1					
Charles L. Upton (Southern Intercollegiate Athletic Association) (1895)
1895	Vanderbilt	5–3–1	3–0	1st (Note: No conference members claimed a championship. Some publications dubbed North Carolina the SIAA champions for racking up a 3–0–1 road trip against SIAA opponents. Fuzzy Woodruff said Vanderbilt was the undisputed southeastern champion, but Virginia held preeminence in the entire South.)			
R. G. Acton (Southern Intercollegiate Athletic Association) (1896–1898)
1896	Vanderbilt	3–2–2	3–0–1	4th			
1897	Vanderbilt	6–0–1	3–0	1st			
1898	Vanderbilt	1–5	1–2	8th			
James L. Crane (Southern Intercollegiate Athletic Association) (1899–1900)
1899	Vanderbilt	7–2	5–0	2nd			
1900	Vanderbilt	4–4–1	2–3–1	8th			
Walter H. Watkins (Southern Intercollegiate Athletic Association) (1901–1902)
1901	Vanderbilt	6–1–1	4–0	1st			
1902	Vanderbilt	8–1	5–1	T–2nd			
James R. Henry (Southern Intercollegiate Athletic Association) (1903)
1903	Vanderbilt	6–1–1	5–1–1	T–1st			
Dan McGugin (Southern Intercollegiate Athletic Association) (1904–1917)
1904	Vanderbilt	9–0	4–0	T–1st			
1905	Vanderbilt	7–1	6–0	1st			
1906	Vanderbilt	8–1	6–0	1st			
1907	Vanderbilt	5–1–1	4–0	1st			
1908	Vanderbilt	7–2–1	3–0–1	3rd			
1909	Vanderbilt	7–3	3–1	T–2nd			
1910	Vanderbilt	8–0–1	5–0	T–1st			
1911	Vanderbilt	8–1	4–0	1st			
1912	Vanderbilt	8–1–1	4–0–1	1st			
1913	Vanderbilt	5–3	2–1	5th			
1914	Vanderbilt	2–6	1–3	13th			
1915	Vanderbilt	9–1	4–0	1st			
1916	Vanderbilt	7–1–1	4–1–1	4th			
1917	Vanderbilt	5–3	5–2	8th			
Ray Morrison (Southern Intercollegiate Athletic Association) (1918)
1918	Vanderbilt	4–2	2–0	T–2nd			
Dan McGugin (Southern Intercollegiate Athletic Association) (1919–1921)
1919	Vanderbilt	5–1–2	4–1–2	4th			
1920	Vanderbilt	5–3–1	3–3	11th			
1921	Vanderbilt	7–0–1	4–0–1	T–1st			
Dan McGugin (Southern Conference) (1922–1932)
1922	Vanderbilt	8–0–1	4–0	T–1st			
1923	Vanderbilt	5–2–1	3–0–1	T–1st			
1924	Vanderbilt	6–3–1	3–3	T–11th			
1925	Vanderbilt	6–3	3–3	T–10th			
1926	Vanderbilt	8–1	4–1	3rd			
1927	Vanderbilt	8–1–2	5–0–2	3rd			
1928	Vanderbilt	8–2	4–2	T–7th			
1929	Vanderbilt	7–2	5–1	5th			
1930	Vanderbilt	8–2	5–2	5th			
1931	Vanderbilt	5–4	3–4	12th			
1932	Vanderbilt	6–1–2	4–1–2	5th			
Dan McGugin (Southeastern Conference) (1933–1934)
1933	Vanderbilt	4–3–3	2–2–2	T–6th			
1934	Vanderbilt	6–3	4–3	6th			
Ray Morrison (Southeastern Conference) (1935–1939)
1935	Vanderbilt	7–3	5–1	2nd			
1936	Vanderbilt	3–5–1	1–3–1	9th			
1937	Vanderbilt	7–2	4–2	4th			
1938	Vanderbilt	6–3	4–3	6th			
1939	Vanderbilt	2–7–1	1–6	11th			
Red Sanders (Southeastern Conference) (1940–1942)
1940	Vanderbilt	3–6–1	0–5–1	11th			
1941	Vanderbilt	8–2	3–2	6th			
1942	Vanderbilt	6–4	2–4	8th			
Ernest Alley (Southeastern Conference) (1943)
1943	Vanderbilt	5–0	0–0	N/A			
Doby Bartling (Southeastern Conference) (1944–1945)
1944	Vanderbilt	3–0–1	0–0	N/A			
1945	Vanderbilt	3–6	2–4	9th			
Red Sanders (Southeastern Conference) (1946–1948)
1946	Vanderbilt	5–4	3–4	7th			
1947	Vanderbilt	6–4	3–3	5th			
1948	Vanderbilt	8–2–1	4–2–1	4th			12
Bill Edwards (Southeastern Conference) (1949–1952)
1949	Vanderbilt	5–5	4–4	7th			
1950	Vanderbilt	7–4	3–4	7th			
1951	Vanderbilt	6–5	3–5	T–7th			
1952	Vanderbilt	3–5–2	1–4–1	11th			
Art Guepe (Southeastern Conference) (1953–1962)
1953	Vanderbilt	3–7	1–5	T–10th			
1954	Vanderbilt	2–7	1–5	T–11th			
1955	Vanderbilt	8–3	5–3	4th	W Gator		
1956	Vanderbilt	5–5	2–5	T–8th			
1957	Vanderbilt	5–3–2	3–3–1	T–6th			
1958	Vanderbilt	5–2–3	2–1–3	4th			
1959	Vanderbilt	5–3–2	3–2–2	T–5th			
1960	Vanderbilt	3–7	0–7	12th			
1961	Vanderbilt	2–8	1–6	12th			
1962	Vanderbilt	1–9	1–6	11th			
John Green (Southeastern Conference) (1963–1966)
1963	Vanderbilt	1–7–2	0–5–2	10th			
1964	Vanderbilt	3–6–1	1–4–1	9th			
1965	Vanderbilt	2–7–1	1–5	T–9th			
1966	Vanderbilt	1–9	0–6	T–9th			
Bill Pace (Southeastern Conference) (1967–1972)
1967	Vanderbilt	2–7–1	0–6	T–9th			
1968	Vanderbilt	5–4–1	2–3–1	8th			
1969	Vanderbilt	4–6	2–3	7th			
1970	Vanderbilt	4–7	1–5	9th			
1971	Vanderbilt	4–6–1	1–5	7th			
1972	Vanderbilt	3–8	0–6	10th			
Steve Sloan (Southeastern Conference) (1973–1974)
1973	Vanderbilt	5–6	1–5	10th			
1974	Vanderbilt	7–3–2	2–3–1	T–7th	T Peach		
Fred Pancoast (Southeastern Conference) (1975–1978)
1975	Vanderbilt	7–4	2–4	6th			
1976	Vanderbilt	2–9	0–6	10th			
1977	Vanderbilt	2–9	0–6	10th			
1978	Vanderbilt	2–9	0–6	10th			
George MacIntyre (Southeastern Conference) (1979–1985)
1979	Vanderbilt	1–10	0–6	T–9th			
1980	Vanderbilt	2–9	0–6	T–9th			
1981	Vanderbilt	4–7	1–5	10th			
1982	Vanderbilt	8–4	4–2	T–3rd	L Hall of Fame Classic		
1983	Vanderbilt	2–9	0–6	T–9th			
1984	Vanderbilt	5–6	2–4	T–7th			
1985	Vanderbilt	3–7–1	1–4–1	8th			
Watson Brown (Southeastern Conference) (1986–1990)
1986	Vanderbilt	1–10	0–6	10th			
1987	Vanderbilt	4–7	1–5	T–7th			
1988	Vanderbilt	3–8	2–5	T–8th			
1989	Vanderbilt	1–10	0–7	10th			
1990	Vanderbilt	1–10	1–6	T–9th			
Gerry DiNardo (Southeastern Conference) (1991–1994)
1991	Vanderbilt	5–6	3–4	T–6th			
1992	Vanderbilt	4–7	2–6	T–5th (Eastern)			
1993	Vanderbilt	5–6	2–6	T–5th (Eastern)			
1994	Vanderbilt	5–6	2–6	5th (Eastern)			
Rod Dowhower (Southeastern Conference) (1995–1996)
1995	Vanderbilt	2–9	1–7	6th (Eastern)			
1996	Vanderbilt	2–9	0–8	6th (Eastern)			
Woody Widenhofer (Southeastern Conference) (1997–2001)
1997	Vanderbilt	3–8	0–8	6th (Eastern)			
1998	Vanderbilt	2–9	1–7	5th (Eastern)			
1999	Vanderbilt	5–6	2–6	5th (Eastern)			
2000	Vanderbilt	3–8	1–7	5th (Eastern)			
2001	Vanderbilt	2–9	0–8	6th (Eastern)			
Bobby Johnson (Southeastern Conference) (2002–2009)
2002	Vanderbilt	2–10	0–8	6th (Eastern)			
2003	Vanderbilt	2–10	1–7	T–5th (Eastern)			
2004	Vanderbilt	2–9	1–7	T–5th (Eastern)			
2005	Vanderbilt	5–6	3–5	5th (Eastern)			
2006	Vanderbilt	4–8	1–7	6th (Eastern)			
2007	Vanderbilt	5–7	2–6	6th (Eastern)			
2008	Vanderbilt	7–6	4–4	T–3rd (Eastern)	W Music City		
2009	Vanderbilt	2–10	0–8	6th (Eastern)			
Robbie Caldwell (Southeastern Conference) (2010)
2010	Vanderbilt	2–10	1–7	6th (Eastern)			
James Franklin (Southeastern Conference) (2011–2013)
2011	Vanderbilt	6–7	2–6	T–4th (Eastern)	L Liberty		
2012	Vanderbilt	9–4	5–3	4th (Eastern)	W Music City	20	23
2013	Vanderbilt	9–4	4–4	4th (Eastern)	W BBVA Compass	23	24
Derek Mason (Southeastern Conference) (2014–2020)
2014	Vanderbilt	3–9	0–8	7th (Eastern)			
2015	Vanderbilt	4–8	2–6	T–4th (Eastern)			
2016	Vanderbilt	6–7	3–5	T–5th (Eastern)	L Independence		
2017	Vanderbilt	5–7	1–7	6th (Eastern)			
2018	Vanderbilt	6–7	3–5	6th (Eastern)	L Texas		
2019	Vanderbilt	3–9	1–7	7th (Eastern)			
2020	Vanderbilt (Note: Todd Fitch served as the interim head coach for Vanderbilt following the firing of Derek Mason in the 2020 season. He coached in one game, a 42–17 loss to Tennessee.)	0–9	0–9	7th (Eastern)			
Clark Lea (Southeastern Conference) (2021–present)
2021	Vanderbilt	2–10	0–8	7th (Eastern)			
2022	Vanderbilt	5–7	2–6	7th (Eastern)			
2023	Vanderbilt	2–10	0–8	7th (Eastern)			
2024	Vanderbilt	7–6	3–5	T–11th	W Birmingham		
2025	Vanderbilt	10–3	6–2	T–5th	L ReliaQuest	15	15
Total:		637–673–50					
National championship Conference title Conference division title or championship game berth
^{†}Indicates Bowl Coalition, Bowl Alliance, BCS, or CFP / New Years' Six bowl.; ^{#}Rankings from final Coaches Poll.; ^{°}Rankings from final AP Poll.
