= 1955 Gator Bowl =

American college football game

Vanderbilt Commodores	Auburn Tigers
(7–3)	(8–1–1)
SEC	SEC
25	13
Head coach: Arthur Guepe	Head coach: Ralph Jordan
	AP / Coaches; 8 / 8
	1	2	3	4	Total
Vanderbilt	7	6	6	6	25
Auburn	0	7	0	6	13
- Date: December 31, 1955
- Season: 1955
- Stadium: Gator Bowl Stadium
- Location: Jacksonville, Florida
- MVP: RB Joe Childress (Auburn); QB Don Orr (Vanderbilt)
- Favorite: Auburn by 6
- Referee: Fred Koster (SEC)
- Attendance: 32,174
- Payout: US$70,000

United States TV coverage
- Network: CBS

The 1955 Gator Bowl, part of the 1955 bowl game season, was the eleventh annual contest and took place on December 31, 1955, at the Gator Bowl Stadium in Jacksonville, Florida. The competing teams were the Vanderbilt Commodores and the Auburn Tigers, both representing the Southeastern Conference (SEC). Vanderbilt upset favored Auburn 25–13 to secure their first ever bowl victory. This remained the lone bowl victory for the Commodores until their 16–14 victory over Boston College in the 2008 Music City Bowl.

== Teams ==
=== Vanderbilt ===
The 1955 Vanderbilt squad finished the regular season 7–3. The Commodores lost to Georgia, Ole Miss and Tennessee. They accepted an invitation to play in the Gator Bowl in the days following their loss to Tennessee. The appearance was the first all-time bowl appearance for Vanderbilt.

=== Auburn ===
The 1955 Auburn squad finished the regular season 8–1–1. The Tigers lost to Tulane and tied Kentucky in route to their third-place finish in the conference. They accepted an invitation to play in the Gator Bowl against Vanderbilt in the days following their victory over long-time rival Alabama. The appearance was the fifth overall bowl appearance and third consecutive in the Gator Bowl for the Tigers.

== Game summary ==
Vanderbilt got on the scoreboard first after Don Orr threw a seven-yard touchdown pass to Joe Stephenson to give the Commodores a 7–0 lead. Auburn responded on the next drive to tie the game at seven after Howell Tubbs connected with Fob James for a 38-yard touchdown reception. The Commodores retook a 13–7 lead on the next drive after Orr scored on a three-yard touchdown run to cap a five-play, 76-yard drive that included a 45-yard run by Orr himself. After having a 51-yard Orr touchdown pass called back because of a holding penalty, Vanderbilt scored later in the quarter on a one-yard Orr touchdown run. The Commodores then scored their final points on the first play of the fourth quarter when Don Hunt scored on a one-yard touchdown run to give Vanderbilt a 25–7 lead. Auburn scored the final points of the game late in the fourth when Joe Childress caught a seven-yard touchdown pass from Jimmy Cook to make the final score 25–13. For their performances, Vanderbilt quarterback Don Orr and Auburn running back Joe Childress mere named co-MVPs of the game.

Scoring summary

Quarter	Time	Drive			Team	Scoring information	Score	
Quarter	Time	Plays	Yards	TOP	Team	Scoring information	Vanderbilt	Auburn
1	4:25		39		Vanderbilt	Joe Stephenson 7-yard touchdown reception from Don Orr, Earl Jalufka kick good	7	0
2	14:10	10	73		Auburn	Fob James 38-yard touchdown reception from Howell Tubbs, Howell Tubbs kick good	7	7
2	11:59	5	76		Vanderbilt	Don Orr 3-yard touchdown run, Earl Jalufka kick no good	13	7
3	4:02		51		Vanderbilt	Don Orr 1-yard touchdown run, Earl Jalufka kick no good	19	7
4		3	26		Vanderbilt	Don Hunt 1-yard touchdown run, Earl Jalufka kick no good (blocked)	25	7
4		6	66		Auburn	Joe Childress 7-yard touchdown reception from Jimmy Cook, Howell Tubbs kick no good	25	13
"TOP" = time of possession. For other American football terms, see Glossary of American football.							25	13
