= Jackie Simpson (defensive back) =

American football player (1934–2017)

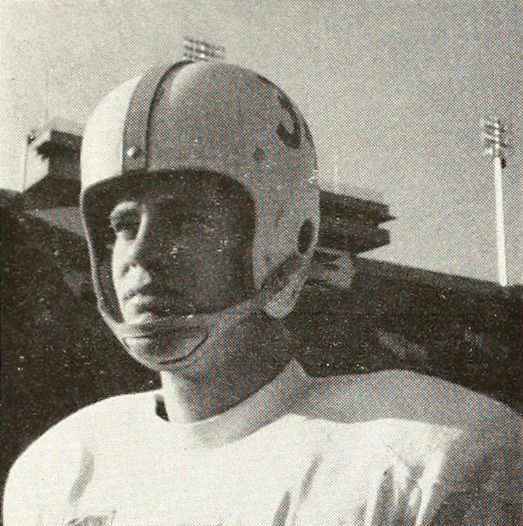
- Simpson, c. 1956

No. 41, 47, 31, 21, 25, 45
- Position: Defensive back

Personal information
- Born: April 2, 1934; Miami, Florida, U.S.
- Died: December 20, 2017 (aged 83); Pensacola, Florida, U.S.
- Listed height: 5 ft 10 in (1.78 m)
- Listed weight: 183 lb (83 kg)

Career information
- High school: Miami Edison
- College: Florida (1953–1956)
- NFL draft: 1957: 4th round, 44th overall pick

Career history
- Baltimore Colts (1958–1960); Pittsburgh Steelers (1961–1962); Toronto Argonauts (1963); Hamilton Tiger-Cats (1964); Montreal Alouettes (1965–1966); Orlando Panthers (1967)

Awards and highlights
- 2× NFL champion (1958, 1959); Second-team All-SEC (1956); 2× Third-team All-SEC (1954, 1955); University of Florida Athletic Hall of Fame

Career NFL statistics
- Interceptions: 2
- Fumble recoveries: 1
- Stats at Pro Football Reference

John Marlin Simpson (April 2, 1934 - December 20, 2017) was an American college and professional football player who was a defensive back in the National Football League (NFL) for five seasons during the late 1950s and early 1960s. Simpson played college football for the University of Florida, and then played professionally for the Baltimore Colts and the Pittsburgh Steelers of the NFL.

== Early life ==
Simpson was born in Miami, Florida in 1934, and grew up in an apartment complex on the Miami bayfront. He attended Miami Edison Senior High School in Miami, and he was a standout high school football halfback for the Edison Raiders.

== College career ==
Simpson accepted an athletic scholarship to attend the University of Florida in Gainesville, Florida, where he played both halfback and defensive back for coach Bob Woodruff's Florida Gators football team from 1953 to 1956. Simpson was a third-team All-Southeastern Conference (SEC) selection in 1954 and 1955, and a second-team All-SEC selection in 1956. Memorably, he had two touchdowns including a 100-yard interception return in a 20–14 win over the Mississippi State Bulldogs in 1955, which remains the longest interception return for a touchdown in SEC history. Several weeks later, he had a 62-yard punt return for a touchdown in the Gators' 18–14 win against the LSU Tigers, again providing the margin of victory. As a halfback on offense, he finished his college career with an average of 6.3 rushing yards per carry—still one of the three best career averages in Gators history. Woodruff ranked him as the Gators' best defensive back and one of their three best running backs of the 1950s.

Simpson was inducted into the University of Florida Athletic Hall of Fame as a "Gator Great" in 2001.

== Professional career ==
The Baltimore Colts selected Simpson in the fourth round (44th overall) of the 1957 NFL draft. He signed with the Colts for $7,800 per season and a $1,000 signing bonus, and played three seasons for the Colts. Before he could report to the Colts' training camp, however, he first had to report for twenty-one months of U.S. Army infantry and paratrooper training at Fort Bragg, North Carolina. After completing his military service obligations, Simpson was activated for the final two games of the 1958 season and served as a reserve defensive back and periodic kick returner for the Baltimore Colts' 1958 and 1959 NFL championship teams of coach Weeb Ewbank.

The Colts traded Simpson to the Pittsburgh Steelers for Billy Ray Smith after the 1960 season, and he played his final two professional seasons for the Steelers in 1961 and 1962. During his five-season NFL career, Simpson played in forty-five regular season games, and recorded two interceptions.

== See also ==
- Florida Gators football, 1950–59
- History of the Indianapolis Colts
- List of Florida Gators in the NFL draft
- List of University of Florida Athletic Hall of Fame members
- List of Pittsburgh Steelers players
