= 2008 Vanderbilt Commodores football team =

American college football season

2008 Vanderbilt Commodores football

Music City Bowl champion

Music City Bowl, W 16–14 vs. Boston College
- Conference: Southeastern Conference
- Eastern Division
- Record: 7–6 (4–4 SEC)
- Head coach: Bobby Johnson (7th season)
- Offensive coordinator: Ted Cain (7th season)
- Offensive scheme: Multiple
- Defensive coordinator: Bruce Fowler (7th season)
- Base defense: 4–3
- Captains: Reshard Langford; Bradley Vierling; George Smith
- Home stadium: Vanderbilt Stadium

2008 Southeastern Conference football standings
	Conf.			Overall
Team	W		L	W		L
Eastern Division
No. 1 Florida x$#	7	–	1	13	–	1
No. 13 Georgia	6	–	2	10	–	3
Vanderbilt	4	–	4	7	–	6
South Carolina	4	–	4	7	–	6
Tennessee	3	–	5	5	–	7
Kentucky	2	–	6	7	–	6
Western Division
No. 6 Alabama x%	8	–	0	12	–	2
No. 14 Ole Miss	5	–	3	9	–	4
LSU	3	–	5	8	–	5
Arkansas	2	–	6	5	–	7
Auburn	2	–	6	5	–	7
Mississippi State	2	–	6	4	–	8
Championship: Florida 31, Alabama 20
# – BCS National Champion; $ – BCS representative as conference champion; % – BCS at-large representative; x – Division champion/co-champions; Rankings from AP Poll

The 2008 Vanderbilt Commodores football team represented Vanderbilt University during the 2008–09 college football season. The team's head coach was Bobby Johnson, who served his seventh season in the position. The Commodores played their six home games at Vanderbilt Stadium at Dudley Field in Nashville, Tennessee.

This was Vanderbilt's first 5–0 start since 1943 and first bowl appearance since 1982, ending a streak of 25 straight losing seasons.

== Schedule ==
Date	Time	Opponent	Rank	Site	TV	Result	Attendance
August 28	6:30 p.m.	at Miami (OH)*		Yager Stadium; Oxford, OH	ESPNU	W 34–13	18,398
September 4	7:30 p.m.	No. 24 South Carolina		Vanderbilt Stadium; Nashville, TN	ESPN	W 24–17	36,850
September 13	6:00 p.m.	Rice*		Vanderbilt Stadium; Nashville, TN		W 38–21	37,370
September 20	6:00 p.m.	at Ole Miss		Vaught–Hemingway Stadium; Oxford, MS (rivalry)		W 23–17	51,281
October 4	5:00 p.m.	No. 13 Auburn	No. 19	Vanderbilt Stadium; Nashville, TN (College GameDay)	ESPN	W 14–13	39,773
October 11	1:30 p.m.	at Mississippi State	No. 13	Davis Wade Stadium; Starkville, MS	PPV	L 14–17	43,619
October 18	11:30 a.m.	at No. 10 Georgia	No. 22	Sanford Stadium; Athens, GA (rivalry)	Raycom	L 14–24	92,746
October 25	2:00 p.m.	Duke*^{†}		Vanderbilt Stadium; Nashville, TN		L 7–10	38,270
November 8	7:00 p.m.	No. 4 Florida		Vanderbilt Stadium; Nashville, TN	ESPN2	L 14–42	39,773
November 15	7:00 p.m.	at Kentucky		Commonwealth Stadium; Lexington, KY (rivalry)	ESPN2	W 31–24	65,595
November 22	11:30 a.m.	Tennessee		Vanderbilt Stadium; Nashville, TN (rivalry)	Raycom	L 10–20	38,725
November 29	6:00 p.m.	at Wake Forest*		BB&T Field; Winston-Salem, NC	ESPNU	L 10–23	25,902
December 31	2:30 p.m.	vs. Boston College*		LP Field; Nashville, TN (Music City Bowl)	ESPN	W 16–14	54,250
*Non-conference game; ^{†}Homecoming; Rankings from AP Poll released week prior to game; All times are in Central time

=== Season summary ===
Following a 4–0 start to the season, the Vanderbilt Commodores were ranked for the first time on the AP Poll since 1984. Following the victory over Auburn, the Commodores were 5–0 for the first time since 1943. After the good start, the Commodores would lose their next four games before a 31-24 victory over Kentucky that declared them bowl eligible for the first time since 1982. Vandy would then lose their final two games of the regular season. They ended the season by going to the Music City Bowl where they defeated Boston College by a score of 16-14, ending a 53-year bowl victory drought.

== Game summaries ==
=== Miami (OH) ===
	1	2	3	4	Total
Commodores	17	10	0	7	34
RedHawks	3	7	3	0	13

=== South Carolina ===
	1	2	3	4	Total
Gamecocks	7	3	0	7	17
Commodores	0	3	14	7	24

=== Rice ===
	1	2	3	4	Total
Owls	14	7	0	0	21
Commodores	7	14	10	7	38

=== Ole Miss ===
	1	2	3	4	Total
Commodores	14	3	0	6	23
Rebels	17	0	0	0	17

=== Auburn ===
	1	2	3	4	Total
Tigers	13	0	0	0	13
Commodores	0	7	7	0	14

ESPN's College GameDay broadcast from Vanderbilt's campus prior to the Auburn game.

=== Mississippi State ===
	1	2	3	4	Total
Commodores	0	7	0	7	14
Bulldogs	3	0	7	7	17

=== Georgia ===
	1	2	3	4	Total
Commodores	0	7	7	0	14
Bulldogs	7	7	7	3	24

=== Duke ===
	1	2	3	4	Total
Blue Devils	0	7	3	0	10
Commodores	0	0	0	7	7

=== Florida ===
	1	2	3	4	Total
Gators	21	14	7	0	42
Commodores	0	0	7	7	14

=== Kentucky ===
	1	2	3	4	Total
Commodores	14	10	0	7	31
Wildcats	0	7	10	7	24

=== Tennessee ===
	1	2	3	4	Total
Volunteers	0	20	0	0	20
Commodores	0	0	10	0	10

=== Wake Forest ===
	1	2	3	4	Total
Commodores	3	0	0	7	10
Demon Deacons	3	7	7	6	23

=== Boston College ===
	1	2	3	4	Total
Eagles	0	7	0	7	14
Commodores	6	0	7	3	16

== Coaching staff ==
- Bobby Johnson – Head coach
- Ted Cain – Offensive coordinator and tight ends coach
- Bruce Fowler – Defensive coordinator
- Robbie Caldwell – Assistant head coach/offensive line coach
- Rick Logo – Defensive line coach
- Warren Belin – Linebackers coach and recruiting coordinator
- Jamie Bryant – Defensive backs coach and special teams coordinator
- Charlie Fisher – Co-passing game coordinator & wide receivers
- Jacob DeLucia – Co-passing game coordinator & quarterbacks
- Desmond Kitchings – Running backs coach
- Michael Hazel – Assistant director of football operations
- Joey Orck – Offensive quality control
- Andy Frank – Defensive quality control
- Norval McKenzie – Offensive graduate assistant
- Mark Moehring – Defensive graduate assistant
- Tom Bossung – Head athletic trainer
- Brian Reese – Associate director of student athletics
- John Sisk – Director of speed, strength and conditioning
- Luke Wyatt – Head equipment manager
- Gary Veach – Assistant equipment manager
