= 1955 Texas A&M Aggies football team =

American college football season

1955 Texas A&M Aggies football
- Conference: Southwest Conference

Ranking
- Coaches: No. 14
- AP: No. 17
- Record: 7–2–1 (4–1–1 SWC)
- Head coach: Bear Bryant (2nd season)
- Home stadium: Kyle Field

1955 Southwest Conference football standings
| | Conf. | | | | | Overall |
| Team | W | | L | | T | W | | L | | T |
|---|---|---|---|---|---|---|---|---|---|---|
| No. 6 TCU $ | 5 | – | 1 | – | 0 | 9 | – | 2 | – | 0 |
| No. 17 Texas A&M | 4 | – | 1 | – | 1 | 7 | – | 2 | – | 1 |
| Texas | 4 | – | 2 | – | 0 | 5 | – | 5 | – | 0 |
| Arkansas | 3 | – | 2 | – | 1 | 5 | – | 4 | – | 1 |
| Baylor | 2 | – | 4 | – | 0 | 5 | – | 5 | – | 0 |
| SMU | 2 | – | 4 | – | 0 | 4 | – | 6 | – | 0 |
| Rice | 0 | – | 6 | – | 0 | 2 | – | 7 | – | 1 |
$ – Conference champion; Rankings from AP Poll

The 1955 Texas A&M Aggies football team represented Texas A&M University in the 1955 college football season as a member of the Southwest Conference (SWC). The Aggies were led by head coach Bear Bryant in his second season and finished with a record of seven wins, two losses and one tie (7–2–1 overall, 4–1–1 in the SWC).

== Schedule ==
| Date | Opponent | Rank | Site | Result | Attendance | Source |
|---|---|---|---|---|---|---|
| September 16 | at No. 1 UCLA* | | Los Angeles Memorial Coliseum; Los Angeles, CA | L 0–21 | 63,334 | |
| September 24 | vs. No. 16 LSU* | | Cotton Bowl; Dallas, TX (rivalry) | W 28–0 | 17,000 | |
| October 1 | Houston* | | Kyle Field; College Station, TX | W 21–3 | 26,000 | |
| October 8 | at Nebraska* | | Memorial Stadium; Lincoln, NE | W 27–0 | 40,000 | |
| October 15 | at No. 7 TCU | No. 19 | Amon G. Carter Stadium; Fort Worth, TX (rivalry) | W 19–16 | 36,881 | |
| October 22 | No. 16 Baylor | No. 12 | Kyle Field; College Station, TX (rivalry) | W 19–7 | 37,000 | |
| October 29 | at Arkansas | No. 11 | Razorback Stadium; Fayetteville, AR (rivalry) | T 7–7 | 27,000 | |
| November 5 | SMU | No. 12 | Kyle Field; College Station, TX | W 13–2 | 38,000 | |
| November 12 | at Rice | No. 9 | Rice Stadium; Houston, TX | W 20–12 | 68,000 | |
| November 24 | Texas | No. 8 | Kyle Field; College Station, TX (rivalry) | L 6–21 | 41,800 | |
*Non-conference game; Rankings from AP Poll released prior to the game
