= 1955 Texas Longhorns football team =

American college football season

1955 Texas Longhorns football
- Conference: Southwest Conference
- Record: 5–5 (4–2 SWC)
- Head coach: Ed Price (5th season)
- Home stadium: Memorial Stadium

1955 Southwest Conference football standings
	Conf.					Overall
Team	W		L		T	W		L		T
No. 6 TCU $	5	–	1	–	0	9	–	2	–	0
No. 17 Texas A&M	4	–	1	–	1	7	–	2	–	1
Texas	4	–	2	–	0	5	–	5	–	0
Arkansas	3	–	2	–	1	5	–	4	–	1
Baylor	2	–	4	–	0	5	–	5	–	0
SMU	2	–	4	–	0	4	–	6	–	0
Rice	0	–	6	–	0	2	–	7	–	1
$ – Conference champion; Rankings from AP Poll

The 1955 Texas Longhorns football team was an American football team that represented the University of Texas (now known as the University of Texas at Austin) as a member of the Southwest Conference (SWC) during the 1955 college football season. In their fifth year under head coach Ed Price, the Longhorns compiled an overall record of 5–5, with a mark of 4–2 in conference play, and finished third in the SWC.

== Schedule ==
Date	Opponent	Site	Result	Attendance	Source
September 17	Texas Tech*	Memorial Stadium; Austin, TX (rivalry)	L 14–20	47,000	
September 24	Tulane*	Memorial Stadium; Austin, TX	W 35–21	30,000	
September 30	at No. 9 USC*	Los Angeles Memorial Coliseum; Los Angeles, CA	L 7–19	61,996	
October 8	vs. No. 3 Oklahoma*	Cotton Bowl; Dallas, TX (rivalry)	L 0–20	75,504	
October 15	at Arkansas	War Memorial Stadium; Little Rock, AR (rivalry)	L 20–27	36,000	
October 22	Rice	Memorial Stadium; Austin, TX (rivalry)	W 32–14	46,000	
October 29	at SMU	Cotton Bowl; Dallas, TX	W 19–18	46,500	
November 5	Baylor	Memorial Stadium; Austin, TX (rivalry)	W 21–20	40,000	
November 12	No. 8 TCU	Memorial Stadium; Austin, TX (rivalry)	L 20–47	55,000	
November 24	at No. 8 Texas A&M	Kyle Field; College Station, TX (rivalry)	W 21–6	41,800	
*Non-conference game; Rankings from AP Poll released prior to the game
