= Robbie Caldwell =

American football player and coach (born 1954)

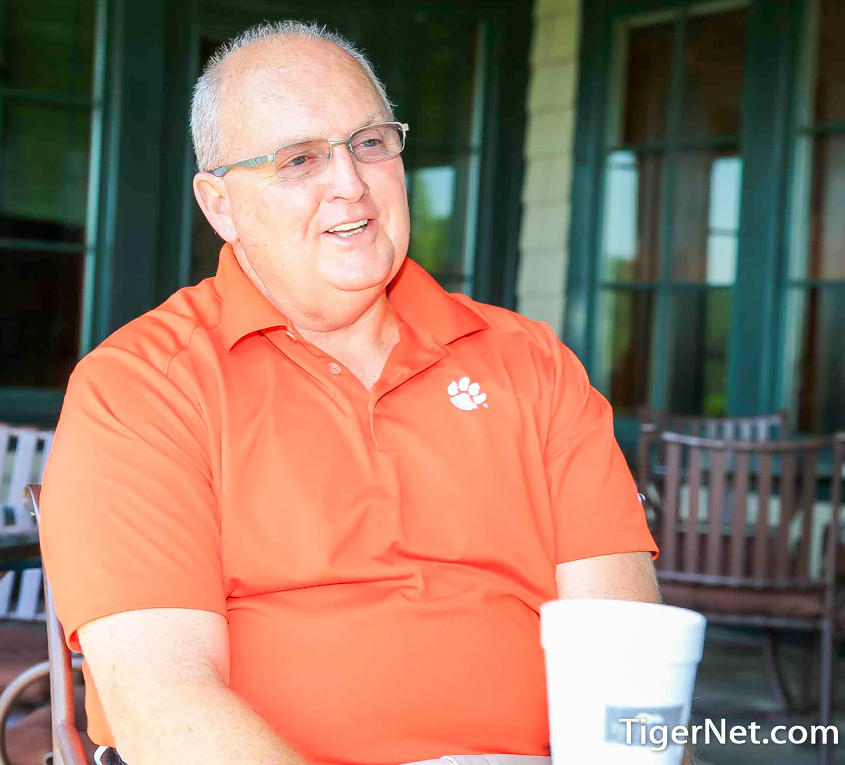

Biographical details
- Born: January 26, 1954 (age 72); Pageland, South Carolina, U.S.

Playing career
- 1974–1976: Furman
- Position: Center

Coaching career (HC unless noted)
- 1978–1985: Furman (OL)
- 1986–1999: NC State (OL)
- 2000–2001: North Carolina (OL)
- 2002–2009: Vanderbilt (OL)
- 2010: Vanderbilt
- 2011–2021: Clemson (OL)

Head coaching record
- Overall: 2–10

Accomplishments and honors

Championships
- 2× CFP national champion (2016, 2018)

Robbie Caldwell (born January 26, 1954) is a retired American football coach, and previously served as the offensive line coach for Clemson University. Caldwell was formerly the head coach of the Vanderbilt Commodores football team. He has also been an assistant coach at Furman University, North Carolina State University, the University of North Carolina at Chapel Hill, and Vanderbilt University. On February 2, 2011 Clemson University named Caldwell offensive line coach to replace the retiring Brad Scott.

== Playing career and education ==
Caldwell, a Pageland, South Carolina native, attended Furman University where he played football and was a three-year letterman. In 1975, he was named the team MVP. He graduated with a B.S. in Health and Physical Education from Furman in 1976.

He is married to Nora Lynn Caldwell, and they have one daughter named Emsley.

== Coaching career ==
Caldwell started his coaching career at Furman University as a graduate assistant in 1976. In 1977, he coached high school football and baseball in Hanahan, South Carolina. His head coaching record as a baseball coach was 14-2. He then returned to Furman, where he mentored the offensive line from 1978 until 1985, when he moved to N.C. State, where he would stay until 2000. From 1997 to 1999, he also held the title of assistant head coach. During his stay at NC State, 14 Wolfpack Linemen would be named All-ACC. He then moved to the University of North Carolina for two seasons.

=== Offensive line coach at Vanderbilt ===
In 2002, Caldwell's long-time friend, Bobby Johnson, was named the head coach at Vanderbilt University. Caldwell joined the Commodores as the offensive line and assistant head coach. He mentored the Commodore line for 8 seasons, during which time he mentored All-SEC standout Chris Williams, picked 14th in the 2008 NFL draft. He helped the Commodores to their first winning season since 1982 and their first bowl victory since 1955 in 2008 when Vanderbilt defeated Boston College 16-14 in the 2008 Music City Bowl. That season earned head coach Bobby Johnson SEC Coach of the Year. During their time at Vanderbilt, Johnson and his staff compiled a 29-66 record, including 12-52 in SEC play. However, Vanderbilt was known as a competitive team, rather than the perennial doormat they had been prior to Johnson's arrival. During Caldwell's years as an assistant, Vanderbilt won road games at Arkansas (2005), Tennessee (2005), Georgia (2006), South Carolina (2007), Ole Miss (2008) and Kentucky (2008). Vanderbilt also defeated Kentucky (2003), Mississippi State (2004), Ole Miss (2005, 2007), Auburn (2008) and South Carolina (2008) at home. Vanderbilt was competitive in many games throughout Caldwell's time as an assistant coach.

=== Head coach at Vanderbilt ===
On July 14, 2010, Bobby Johnson announced his retirement from college football. Robbie Caldwell was immediately named the interim head coach for the 2010 season, and, according to Vanderbilt Vice-Chancellor David Williams, "will be given every opportunity to win the head coaching job."

On August 2, 2010, Vanderbilt Vice-Chancellor David Williams announced that the "interim" tag would be dropped from Caldwell's title, and that they had agreed to a new contract. Vanderbilt did not release the terms of the contract, but it is known to have been a multiyear contract.

Caldwell was a hit in his first public appearance at SEC Media Days, and has been a popular guest among sports talk shows. His first major coaching decision came on August 6, 2010, when he hired Herb Hand, former offensive co-coordinator at the University of Tulsa to be the offensive line coach at Vanderbilt.

On September 18, 2010, following close home losses to Northwestern and LSU, Caldwell picked up his first ever win as a head coach, as the Vanderbilt Commodores defeated the Ole Miss Rebels 28-14 in Oxford, MS. He became the first Vanderbilt coach since 1975 to win his road debut. Caldwell won his second game 52-6 against the Eagles of Eastern Michigan University. However, starting with a 43-0 loss to the University of Georgia, the Commodores began a six-game losing streak going into the season ending game against Wake Forest University. On November 27, hours before kickoff against Wake Forest, Robbie Caldwell announced that he would resign as head coach effective that evening saying, “Having the opportunity to be Vanderbilt’s head football coach has been a dream come true and I greatly appreciated the chance to serve, and I gave it my best. However, after a lot of reflection, I’ve realized it is time for me to step aside and let someone else pick up the hard work and efforts of our staff.”

== Head coaching record ==
Year	Team	Overall	Conference	Standing	Bowl/playoffs
Vanderbilt Commodores (Southeastern Conference) (2010)
2010	Vanderbilt	2–10	1–7	6th (Eastern)	
Vanderbilt:		2–10	1–7		
Total:		2–10			
