= 1955 Florida Gators football team =

American college football season

1955 Florida Gators football
- Conference: Southeastern Conference
- Record: 4–6 (3–5 SEC)
- Head coach: Bob Woodruff (6th season)
- Home stadium: Florida Field

1955 Southeastern Conference football standings
	Conf.					Overall
Team	W		L		T	W		L		T
No. 10 Ole Miss $	5	–	1	–	0	10	–	1	–	0
No. 8 Auburn	5	–	2	–	1	8	–	2	–	1
No. 7 Georgia Tech	4	–	1	–	1	9	–	1	–	1
Tennessee	3	–	2	–	1	6	–	3	–	1
Vanderbilt	4	–	3	–	0	8	–	3	–	0
Mississippi State	4	–	4	–	0	6	–	4	–	0
Kentucky	3	–	3	–	1	6	–	3	–	1
Tulane	3	–	3	–	1	5	–	4	–	1
LSU	2	–	3	–	1	3	–	5	–	2
Florida	3	–	5	–	0	4	–	6	–	0
Georgia	2	–	5	–	0	4	–	6	–	0
Alabama	0	–	7	–	0	0	–	10	–	0
$ – Conference champion; Rankings from AP Poll

The 1955 Florida Gators football team represented the University of Florida during the 1955 college football season. The season was Bob Woodruff's sixth as the head coach of the Florida Gators football team. The Gators played their only eight-game Southeastern Conference schedule before the 1990s, and probably the most difficult of the 1950s. The standout Gator players included offensive and defensive tackle John Barrow, halfback and punter Don Chandler, two-way halfback Jackie Simpson and defensive back John Symank. The highlights of the 1955 season included three conference victories over the Mississippi State Maroons (20–14), LSU Tigers (18–14), and Georgia Bulldogs (19–13). The Gators closed out the season with a knife's edge 7–6 road loss to the Miami Hurricanes in their home stadium in Miami, Florida. Woodruff's 1955 Florida Gators finished 4–6 overall and 3–5 in the SEC, placing tenth of twelve teams in the conference.

== Schedule ==
Date	Opponent	Rank	Site	Result	Attendance	Source
September 17	Mississippi State		Florida Field; Gainesville, FL	W 20–14	29,000	
September 24	No. 2 Georgia Tech	No. 19	Florida Field; Gainesville, FL	L 7–14	40,000	
October 1	at Auburn		Cliff Hare Stadium; Auburn, AL (rivalry)	L 0–13	26,000	
October 8	vs. George Washington*		Gator Bowl Stadium; Jacksonville, FL	W 28–0	18,000	
October 15	LSU		Florida Field; Gainesville, FL (rivalry)	W 18–14	30,000	
October 22	at Kentucky		McLean Stadium; Lexington, KY (rivalry)	L 7–10		
November 5	vs. Georgia		Gator Bowl Stadium; Jacksonville, FL (rivalry)	W 19–13	37,000	
November 12	Tennessee^{†}		Florida Field; Gainesville, FL (rivalry)	L 0–20	42,400	
November 19	at Vanderbilt		Dudley Field; Nashville, TN	L 6–21	16,500	
November 26	at No. 14 Miami (FL)*		Burdine Stadium; Miami, FL (rivalry)	L 6–7	49,362	
*Non-conference game; ^{†}Homecoming; Rankings from AP Poll released prior to the game
