= 1955 Rice Owls football team =

American college football season

1955 Rice Owls football
- Conference: Southwest Conference
- Record: 2–7–1 (0–6 SWC)
- Head coach: Jess Neely (16th season)
- Home stadium: Rice Stadium

1955 Southwest Conference football standings
	Conf.					Overall
Team	W		L		T	W		L		T
No. 6 TCU $	5	–	1	–	0	9	–	2	–	0
No. 17 Texas A&M	4	–	1	–	1	7	–	2	–	1
Texas	4	–	2	–	0	5	–	5	–	0
Arkansas	3	–	2	–	1	5	–	4	–	1
Baylor	2	–	4	–	0	5	–	5	–	0
SMU	2	–	4	–	0	4	–	6	–	0
Rice	0	–	6	–	0	2	–	7	–	1
$ – Conference champion; Rankings from AP Poll

The 1955 Rice Owls football team represented Rice Institute during the 1955 college football season. The Owls were led by 16th-year head coach Jess Neely and played their home games at Rice Stadium in Houston, Texas. They competed as members of the Southwest Conference, finishing in last. Despite starting the year with high expectations, ranked 11th in the preseason AP Poll, the Owls had a disastrous season, finishing winless in conference and 2–7–1 overall. It was Rice's first losing season since 1945.

== Schedule ==
Date	Opponent	Rank	Site	Result	Attendance	Source
September 24	Alabama*	No. 13	Rice Stadium; Houston, TX	W 20–0	50,000	
October 1	LSU*	No. 11	Rice Stadium; Houston, TX	T 20–20	51,000	
October 8	No. 16 Clemson*		Rice Stadium; Houston, TX	W 21–7	37,500	
October 15	at SMU	No. 15	Cotton Bowl; Dallas, TX (rivalry)	L 0–20	46,000	
October 22	at Texas		Memorial Stadium; Austin, TX (rivalry)	L 14–32	46,000	
October 29	at Kentucky*		Stoll Field; Lexington, KY	L 16–20	33,000	
November 5	Arkansas		Rice Stadium; Houston, TX	L 0–10	42,000	
November 12	No. 9 Texas A&M		Rice Stadium; Houston, TX	L 12–20	68,000	
November 19	at No. 7 TCU		Amon G. Carter Stadium; Fort Worth, TX	L 0–35	28,000	
November 26	Baylor		Rice Stadium; Houston, TX	L 7–15	33,000	
*Non-conference game; Rankings from AP Poll released prior to the game
