= 1955 Vanderbilt Commodores football team =

American college football season

1955 Vanderbilt Commodores football

Gator Bowl champion

Gator Bowl, W 25–13 vs. Auburn
- Conference: Southeastern Conference
- Record: 8–3 (4–3 SEC)
- Head coach: Art Guepe (3rd season)
- Captains: Larry Frank; Jim Cunningham
- Home stadium: Dudley Field

1955 Southeastern Conference football standings
	Conf.					Overall
Team	W		L		T	W		L		T
No. 10 Ole Miss $	5	–	1	–	0	10	–	1	–	0
No. 8 Auburn	5	–	2	–	1	8	–	2	–	1
No. 7 Georgia Tech	4	–	1	–	1	9	–	1	–	1
Tennessee	3	–	2	–	1	6	–	3	–	1
Vanderbilt	4	–	3	–	0	8	–	3	–	0
Mississippi State	4	–	4	–	0	6	–	4	–	0
Kentucky	3	–	3	–	1	6	–	3	–	1
Tulane	3	–	3	–	1	5	–	4	–	1
LSU	2	–	3	–	1	3	–	5	–	2
Florida	3	–	5	–	0	4	–	6	–	0
Georgia	2	–	5	–	0	4	–	6	–	0
Alabama	0	–	7	–	0	0	–	10	–	0
$ – Conference champion; Rankings from AP Poll

The 1955 Vanderbilt Commodores football team represented Vanderbilt University during the 1955 college football season. The team's head coach was Art Guepe, who was in his third year as the Commodores' head coach. Members of the Southeastern Conference, the Commodores played their home games at Dudley Field in Nashville, Tennessee. In 1955, Vanderbilt went 8–3 overall with a conference record of 4–3 this was the best SEC record for Vandy until 2012 when they had an SEC record of 5–3. The team was led by Don Orr and Charley Horton.

== Schedule ==
Date	Opponent	Rank	Site	Result	Attendance	Source
September 24	at Georgia		Sanford Stadium; Athens, GA (rivalry)	L 13–14	20,000	
October 1	Alabama		Dudley Field; Nashville, TN	W 21–6	27,500	
October 8	vs. Ole Miss		Crump Stadium; Memphis, TN (rivalry)	L 0–13	23,207	
October 14	at Chattanooga*		Chamberlain Field; Chattanooga, TN	W 12–0	8,500	
October 22	Middle Tennessee*		Dudley Field; Nashville, TN	W 20–13	17,500	
October 29	Virginia*		Dudley Field; Nashville, TN	W 34–7	15,500	
November 5	Kentucky^{†}		Dudley Field; Nashville, TN (rivalry)	W 34–0	28,000	
November 12	at Tulane		Tulane Stadium; New Orleans, LA	W 20–7		
November 19	Florida		Dudley Field; Nashville, TN	W 21–6	16,500	
November 26	Tennessee	No. 19	Shields–Watkins Field; Knoxville, TN (rivalry)	L 14–20	40,000	
December 31	vs. No. 8 Auburn*		Gator Bowl Stadium; Jacksonville, FL (Gator Bowl)	W 25–13	32,174	
*Non-conference game; ^{†}Homecoming; Rankings from AP Poll released prior to the game
