= 1955 Mississippi State Maroons football team =

American college football season

1955 Mississippi State Maroons football
- Conference: Southeastern Conference
- Record: 6–4 (4–4 SEC)
- Head coach: Darrell Royal (2nd season)
- Home stadium: Scott Field

1955 Southeastern Conference football standings
	Conf.					Overall
Team	W		L		T	W		L		T
No. 10 Ole Miss $	5	–	1	–	0	10	–	1	–	0
No. 8 Auburn	5	–	2	–	1	8	–	2	–	1
No. 7 Georgia Tech	4	–	1	–	1	9	–	1	–	1
Tennessee	3	–	2	–	1	6	–	3	–	1
Vanderbilt	4	–	3	–	0	8	–	3	–	0
Mississippi State	4	–	4	–	0	6	–	4	–	0
Kentucky	3	–	3	–	1	6	–	3	–	1
Tulane	3	–	3	–	1	5	–	4	–	1
LSU	2	–	3	–	1	3	–	5	–	2
Florida	3	–	5	–	0	4	–	6	–	0
Georgia	2	–	5	–	0	4	–	6	–	0
Alabama	0	–	7	–	0	0	–	10	–	0
$ – Conference champion; Rankings from AP Poll

The 1955 Mississippi State Maroons football team represented Mississippi State College during the 1955 college football season. The team was led by second-year head coach Darrell Royal and compiled a 6–4 record, sixth in the Southeastern Conference.

Halfback Art Davis was named to the FWAA/Look Magazine All America Team and voted their College "Player of the Year". Guard Scott Suber was named to the first team NEA All America Team.

After the season, Royal left in late February to become the head football coach at the University of Washington.

== Schedule ==
Date	Opponent	Rank	Site	Result	Attendance	Source
September 17	at Florida		Florida Field; Gainesville, FL	L 14–20	29,000	
September 24	at Tennessee		Shields–Watkins Field; Knoxville, TN	W 13–7	16,500	
October 1	Memphis State*		Scott Field; Starkville, MS	W 33–0		
October 8	Tulane		Scott Field; Starkville, MS	W 14–0	20,000	
October 15	at No. 20 Kentucky		McLean Stadium; Lexington, KY	W 20–14		
October 22	at Alabama		Denny Stadium; Tuscaloosa, AL (rivalry)	W 26–7	28,000	
October 29	North Texas State*		Scott Field; Starkville, MS	W 20–7	13,000	
November 5	at No. 14 Auburn	No. 20	Cliff Hare Stadium; Auburn, AL	L 26–27	34,000	
November 12	at LSU	No. 18	Tiger Stadium; Baton Rouge, LA (rivalry)	L 7–34		
November 26	No. 15 Ole Miss		Scott Field; Starkville, MS (Egg Bowl)	L 0–26	36,000	
*Non-conference game; Rankings from AP Poll released prior to the game

== After the season ==
=== NFL draft ===
The following Maroons were selected in the 1956 NFL draft after the season.

Round	Pick	Player	Position	NFL team
1	5	Art Davis	Halfback	Pittsburgh Steelers
21	247	Jim Harness	Back	Baltimore Colts
