= 1955 TCU Horned Frogs football team =

American college football season

1955 TCU Horned Frogs football

SWC champion

Cotton Bowl Classic, L 13–14 vs. Ole Miss
- Conference: Southwest Conference

Ranking
- Coaches: No. 6
- AP: No. 6
- Record: 9–2 (5–1 SWC)
- Head coach: Abe Martin (3rd season)
- Offensive scheme: Meyer spread
- Home stadium: Amon G. Carter Stadium

1955 Southwest Conference football standings
	Conf.					Overall
Team	W		L		T	W		L		T
No. 6 TCU $	5	–	1	–	0	9	–	2	–	0
No. 17 Texas A&M	4	–	1	–	1	7	–	2	–	1
Texas	4	–	2	–	0	5	–	5	–	0
Arkansas	3	–	2	–	1	5	–	4	–	1
Baylor	2	–	4	–	0	5	–	5	–	0
SMU	2	–	4	–	0	4	–	6	–	0
Rice	0	–	6	–	0	2	–	7	–	1
$ – Conference champion; Rankings from AP Poll

The 1955 TCU Horned Frogs football team represented Texas Christian University (TCU) in the 1955 college football season. The Horned Frogs finished the season 9–2 overall and 5–1 in the Southwest Conference. The team was coached by Abe Martin in his third year as head coach. The Frogs played their home games in Amon G. Carter Stadium, which is located on campus in Fort Worth, Texas. They were invited to the Cotton Bowl Classic where they lost to Ole Miss by a score of 13–14.

== Schedule ==
Date	Opponent	Rank	Site	TV	Result	Attendance	Source
September 17	Kansas*		Amon G. Carter Stadium; Fort Worth, TX		W 47–14	25,000	
September 24	at No. 12 Texas Tech*		Jones Stadium; Lubbock, TX (rivalry)		W 32–0	28,000	
October 1	at Arkansas	No. 10	Razorback Stadium; Fayetteville, AR		W 26–0	22,000	
October 8	at Alabama*	No. 8	Denny Stadium; Tuscaloosa, AL		W 21–0	20,000	
October 15	No. 19 Texas A&M	No. 7	Amon G. Carter Stadium; Fort Worth, TX (rivalry)		L 16–19	36,881	
October 21	at Miami (FL)*	No. 18	Burdine Stadium; Miami, FL		W 21–19	44,045	
October 29	at Baylor	No. 14	Baylor Stadium; Waco, TX (rivalry)		W 28–6	34,000	
November 12	at Texas	No. 8	Memorial Stadium; Austin, TX (rivalry)		W 47–20	55,000	
November 19	Rice	No. 7	Amon G. Carter Stadium; Fort Worth, TX		W 35–0	28,000	
November 26	SMU	No. 7	Amon G. Carter Stadium; Fort Worth, TX (rivalry)		W 20–13	33,000	
January 2, 1956	vs. No. 15 Ole Miss	No. 7	Cotton Bowl; Dallas, TX (Cotton Bowl Classic)	NBC	L 13–14	75,500	
*Non-conference game; Rankings from AP Poll released prior to the game
