= 1956 Cotton Bowl Classic =

- 20th Cotton Bowl Classic
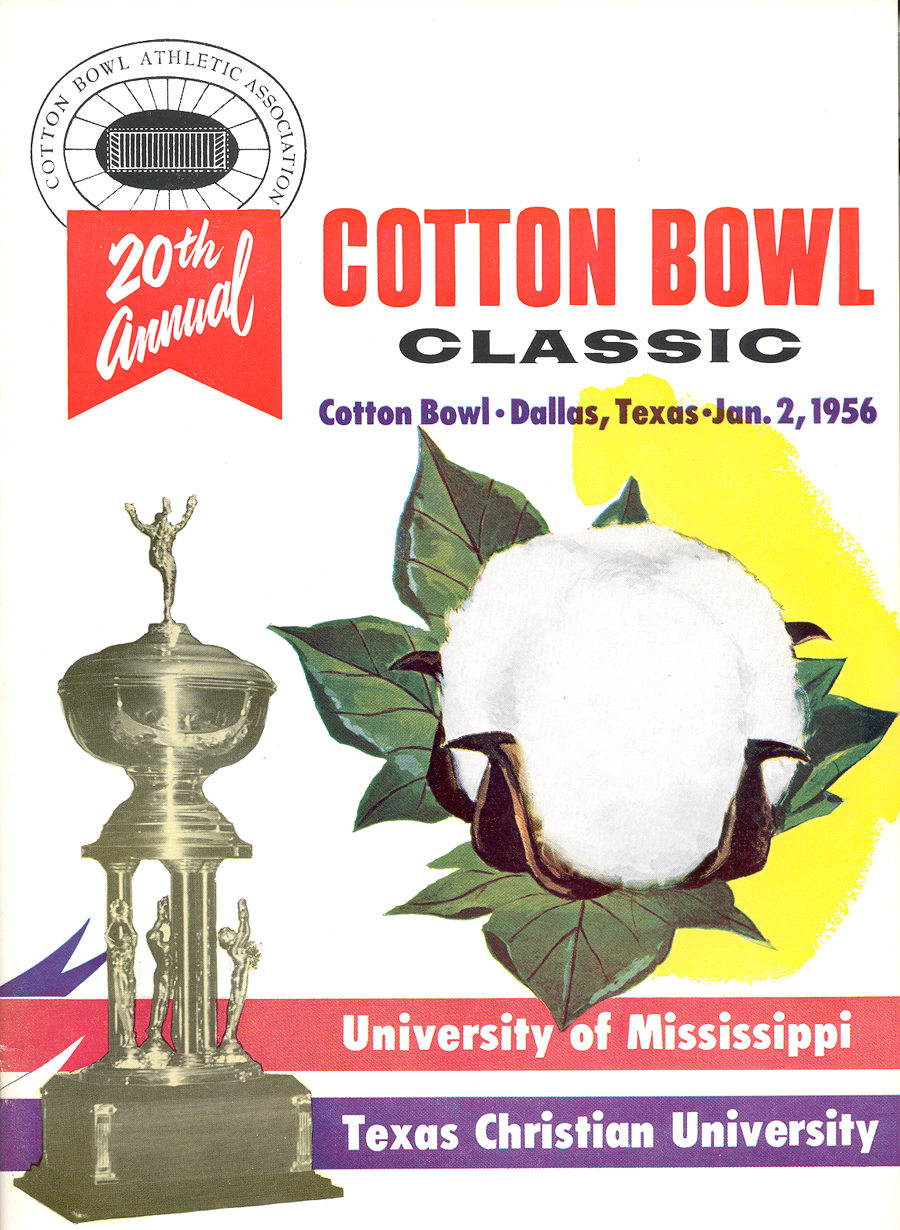
Ole Miss Rebels	TCU Horned Frogs
(9–1)	(9–1)
SEC	SWC
14	13
Head coach: Johnny Vaught	Head coach: Abe Martin
AP / Coaches; 10 / 9	AP / Coaches; 6 / 5
	1	2	3	4	Total
Ole Miss	0	7	0	7	14
TCU	7	6	0	0	13
- Date: January 2, 1956
- Season: 1955
- Stadium: Cotton Bowl
- Location: Dallas, Texas
- MVP: Eagle Day (Ole Miss QB); Buddy Alliston (Ole Miss G)
- Favorite: TCU
- Referee: Cliff Shaw (SWC; split crew: SWC, SEC)
- Attendance: 75,500

United States TV coverage
- Network: NBC
- Announcers: Lindsey Nelson, Red Grange

The Cotton Bowl in Dallas, Texas, hosted the Cotton Bowl Classic.

The 1956 Cotton Bowl Classic was the twentieth edition of the college football bowl game, played at the Cotton Bowl in Dallas, Texas, on Monday, January 2. Part of the 1955–56 bowl game season, it matched the sixth-ranked TCU Horned Frogs of the Southwest Conference (SWC) and the #10 Ole Miss Rebels of the Southeastern Conference (SEC). Underdog Ole Miss rallied to win by a point, 14–13.

New Year's Day was on Sunday in 1956; the major bowl games were played the following day.

== Teams ==
Both teams had 9–1 records.

=== TCU ===
TCU hadn't been to a bowl game since the Cotton Bowl four years earlier.

=== Mississippi ===
Ole Miss was trying to win their first bowl game since the 1948 Delta Bowl, which was also against TCU.

== Game summary ==
On the game's first play, TCU quarterback and returner Chuck Curtis injured his shoulder and broke two ribs. He sat out the rest of the game and was replaced by Dick Finney, who went one for three passing for thirteen yards and rushed for five yards. Halfback Jim Swink helped carry TCU to with two rushing touchdowns and finished with 107 yards. On the second extra point attempt by TCU, Harold Pollard missed after having to try again due to a penalty on TCU. Down 13–0, Ole Miss quarterback Eagle Day and running back Paige Cothren led the team back, with Cotheren's 3-yard run narrowing the lead to six at halftime.

The second half had only one score, but it was crucial. With 9:34 to play, Ole Miss started their drive after a punt. And with 4:22 left, the Rebels scored on a Billy Lott touchdown run. The extra point was converted by Cothren, as Mississippi held on to win their first bowl game since 1948.

=== Scoring ===
First quarter

- TCU – Jim Swink 1-yard run (Harold Pollard kick)

Second quarter

- TCU – Swink 39-yard run (Pollard kick fail),
- Miss – Paige Cothren 3-yard run (Cothren kick)

Third quarter

No scoring

Fourth quarter

- Miss – Billy Lott 5-yard run (Cothren kick)

== Statistics ==
Statistics	TCU	Ole Miss
First downs	11	12
Yards rushing	233	92
Yards passing	20	137
Total yards	253	229
Punts-Average	5–28.8	6–42.7
Fumbles-Lost	2–1	1–1
Interceptions	2	0
Penalties-Yards	8–80	6–80
