= 1955 SMU Mustangs football team =

American college football season

1955 SMU Mustangs football
- Conference: Southwest Conference
- Record: 4–6 (2–4 SWC)
- Head coach: Woody Woodard (3rd season)
- Captains: Forrest Gregg; David Hawk
- Home stadium: Cotton Bowl

1955 Southwest Conference football standings
	Conf.					Overall
Team	W		L		T	W		L		T
No. 6 TCU $	5	–	1	–	0	9	–	2	–	0
No. 17 Texas A&M	4	–	1	–	1	7	–	2	–	1
Texas	4	–	2	–	0	5	–	5	–	0
Arkansas	3	–	2	–	1	5	–	4	–	1
Baylor	2	–	4	–	0	5	–	5	–	0
SMU	2	–	4	–	0	4	–	6	–	0
Rice	0	–	6	–	0	2	–	7	–	1
$ – Conference champion; Rankings from AP Poll

The 1955 SMU Mustangs football team represented Southern Methodist University (SMU) as a member of the Southwest Conference (SWC) during the 1955 college football season. Led by third-year head coach Woody Woodard, the Mustangs compiled an overall record of 4–6 with a mark of 2–4 in conference play, tying for fifth place in the SWC. SMU played home games at the Cotton Bowl in Dallas. Forrest Gregg and David Hawk were the team captains.

== Schedule ==
Date	Opponent	Site	Result	Attendance	Source
September 24	at No. 11 Notre Dame*	Notre Dame Stadium; Notre Dame, IN	L 0–17	56,454	
October 1	at No. 3 Georgia Tech*	Grant Field; Atlanta, GA	L 7–20	34,000	
October 7	Missouri*	Cotton Bowl; Dallas, TX	W 13–6	25,000	
October 15	No. 15 Rice	Cotton Bowl; Dallas, TX (rivalry)	W 20–0	46,000	
October 22	at Kansas*	Memorial Stadium; Lawrence, KS	W 33–14	20,000	
October 29	Texas	Cotton Bowl; Dallas, TX	L 18–19	46,000	
November 5	at No. 12 Texas A&M	Kyle Field; College Station, TX	L 2–13	38,000	
November 12	Arkansas	Cotton Bowl; Dallas, TX	L 0–6	32,500	
November 19	at Baylor	Baylor Stadium; Waco, TX	W 12–0	20,000	
November 26	at No. 7 TCU	Amon G. Carter Stadium; Fort Worth, TX (rivalry)	L 13–20	33,000	
*Non-conference game; Rankings from AP Poll released prior to the game
