= 1955 Arkansas Razorbacks football team =

American college football season

1955 Arkansas Razorbacks football
- Conference: Southwest Conference
- Record: 5–4–1 (3–2–1 SWC)
- Head coach: Jack Mitchell (1st season)
- Captains: Preston Carpenter; Henry Moore
- Home stadium: Razorback Stadium; War Memorial Stadium

1955 Southwest Conference football standings
	Conf.					Overall
Team	W		L		T	W		L		T
No. 6 TCU $	5	–	1	–	0	9	–	2	–	0
No. 17 Texas A&M	4	–	1	–	1	7	–	2	–	1
Texas	4	–	2	–	0	5	–	5	–	0
Arkansas	3	–	2	–	1	5	–	4	–	1
Baylor	2	–	4	–	0	5	–	5	–	0
SMU	2	–	4	–	0	4	–	6	–	0
Rice	0	–	6	–	0	2	–	7	–	1
$ – Conference champion; Rankings from AP Poll

The 1955 Arkansas Razorbacks football team represented the University of Arkansas in the Southwest Conference (SWC) during the 1955 college football season. In their first year under head coach Jack Mitchell, the Razorbacks compiled a 5–4–1 record (3–2–1 against SWC opponents), finished in fourth place in the SWC, and outscored all opponents by a combined total of 126 to 114.

== Schedule ==
Date	Opponent	Rank	Site	Result	Attendance	Source
September 17	Tulsa*		Razorback Stadium; Fayetteville, AR	W 21–6	18,000	
September 24	Oklahoma A&M*	No. 17	War Memorial Stadium; Little Rock, AR	W 21–0	30,000	
October 1	No. 10 TCU		Razorback Stadium; Fayetteville, AR	L 0–26	22,000	
October 8	at Baylor		Baylor Stadium; Waco, TX	L 20–25	28,000	
October 15	Texas		War Memorial Stadium; Little Rock, AR (rivalry)	W 27–20	36,000	
October 22	at Ole Miss*		Hemingway Stadium; Oxford, MS (rivalry)	L 7–17	30,000	
October 29	No. 11 Texas A&M		Razorback Stadium; Fayetteville, AR (rivalry)	T 7–7	27,000	
November 5	at Rice		Rice Stadium; Houston, TX	W 10–0	42,000	
November 12	at SMU		Cotton Bowl; Dallas, TX	W 6–0	32,500	
November 19	LSU*		War Memorial Stadium; Little Rock, AR (rivalry)	L 7–13	35,000	
*Non-conference game; Rankings from AP Poll released prior to the game

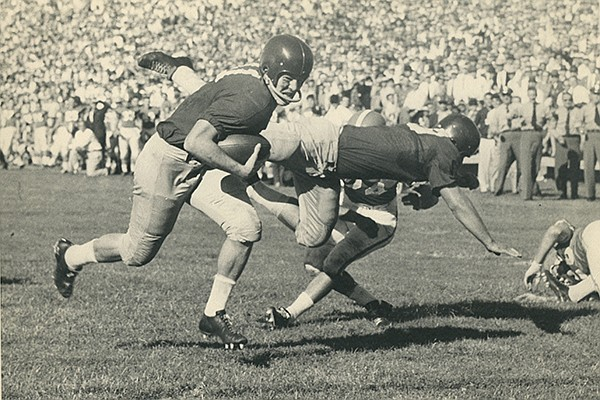
Ronnie Underwood runs for a touchdown against Texas
