= 1955 Baylor Bears football team =

American college football season

1955 Baylor Bears football
- Conference: Southwest Conference
- Record: 5–5 (2–4 SWC)
- Head coach: George Sauer (6th season)
- Captains: Hank Gremminger; Weldon W. Holley
- Home stadium: Baylor Stadium

1955 Southwest Conference football standings
	Conf.					Overall
Team	W		L		T	W		L		T
No. 6 TCU $	5	–	1	–	0	9	–	2	–	0
No. 17 Texas A&M	4	–	1	–	1	7	–	2	–	1
Texas	4	–	2	–	0	5	–	5	–	0
Arkansas	3	–	2	–	1	5	–	4	–	1
Baylor	2	–	4	–	0	5	–	5	–	0
SMU	2	–	4	–	0	4	–	6	–	0
Rice	0	–	6	–	0	2	–	7	–	1
$ – Conference champion; Rankings from AP Poll

The 1955 Baylor Bears football team represented Baylor University as a member of the Southwest Conference (SWC) during the 1955 college football season. Led by George Sauer in his sixth and final season as head coach, the Bears compiled an overall record of 5–5 with a mark of 2–4 in conference play, tying for fifth place the SWC. Baylor played home games at Baylor Stadium in Waco, Texas.

Hank Gremminger was named to the All-Southwest Conference team as an end for the second consecutive season.

== Schedule ==
Date	Opponent	Rank	Site	Result	Attendance	Source
September 17	Hardin–Simmons*		Baylor Stadium; Waco, TX	W 35–7	20,000	
September 24	at Villanova*	No. 18	Philadelphia Municipal Stadium; Philadelphia, PA	W 19–2	63,409	
October 1	No. 1 Maryland*	No. 20	Baylor Stadium; Waco, TX	L 6–20	39,000	
October 8	Arkansas		Baylor Stadium; Waco, TX	W 25–20	28,000	
October 15	at No. 12 Washington*		Husky Stadium; Seattle, WA	W 13–7	39,536	
October 22	at No. 12 Texas A&M	No. 16	Kyle Field; College Station, TX (rivalry)	L 7–19	37,000	
October 29	No. 15 TCU^{†}		Baylor Stadium; Waco, TX (rivalry)	L 6–28	34,000	
November 5	at Texas		Memorial Stadium; Austin, TX (rivalry)	L 20–21	40,000	
November 19	SMU		Baylor Stadium; Waco, TX	L 0–12	20,000	
November 26	at Rice		Rice Stadium; Houston, TX	W 15–7	33,000	
*Non-conference game; ^{†}Homecoming; Rankings from AP Poll released prior to the game
