= Don Orr =

American football player and official

No. 10
- Position: Quarterback

Career information
- College: Vanderbilt (1955)

Awards and highlights
- Vanderbilt's first bowl victory

Donald C. Orr was an American football player and official. He was born in Miami, Florida.

== Vanderbilt University ==
Orr was a prominent quarterback for the Vanderbilt Commodores football teams of Vanderbilt University.

=== 1955 ===
Orr led Vanderbilt to its first bowl victory by defeating Auburn 25 to 13 in the 1955 Gator Bowl. He was selected Vanderbilt's MVP of the game, and received a standing ovation upon getting the award. Vandy's first two scores were a pass Orr to Joe Stephenson and a run by Orr respectively.

== NFL draft ==
He was drafted 311th overall by the Chicago Bears in 26th round of the 1956 NFL draft; but he never talked to the team.

== Official ==
Orr was a prominent National Football League (NFL) official for 25 seasons, from 1971 through 1995, and a field judge in three Super Bowls. He wore uniform number 77 for the majority of his NFL career. As a side judge in the 1979 AFC Championship Game between the Houston Oilers and the Pittsburgh Steelers, Orr made a controversial incomplete pass call denying Oilers receiver Mike Renfro an apparent game-tying touchdown late in the third quarter. The Oilers subsequently settled for a field goal and went on to lose 27–13. The controversy prompted calls for the NFL to institute replay review.

== Contracting ==
Though officially retired in 2006, Orr is chairman of the board of Nashville Machine Co., a mechanical contracting company.
