= 1955 Georgia Tech Yellow Jackets football team =

American college football season

1955 Georgia Tech Yellow Jackets football

Sugar Bowl champion

Sugar Bowl, W 7–0 vs. Pittsburgh
- Conference: Southeastern Conference

Ranking
- Coaches: No. 7
- AP: No. 7
- Record: 9–1–1 (4–1–1 SEC)
- Head coach: Bobby Dodd (11th season)
- Captain: Jimmy Morris
- Home stadium: Grant Field

1955 Southeastern Conference football standings
	Conf.					Overall
Team	W		L		T	W		L		T
No. 10 Ole Miss $	5	–	1	–	0	10	–	1	–	0
No. 8 Auburn	5	–	2	–	1	8	–	2	–	1
No. 7 Georgia Tech	4	–	1	–	1	9	–	1	–	1
Tennessee	3	–	2	–	1	6	–	3	–	1
Vanderbilt	4	–	3	–	0	8	–	3	–	0
Mississippi State	4	–	4	–	0	6	–	4	–	0
Kentucky	3	–	3	–	1	6	–	3	–	1
Tulane	3	–	3	–	1	5	–	4	–	1
LSU	2	–	3	–	1	3	–	5	–	2
Florida	3	–	5	–	0	4	–	6	–	0
Georgia	2	–	5	–	0	4	–	6	–	0
Alabama	0	–	7	–	0	0	–	10	–	0
$ – Conference champion; Rankings from AP Poll

The 1955 Georgia Tech Yellow Jackets football team was an American football team that represented Georgia Tech as a member of the Southeastern Conference (SEC) during the 1955 college football season. In their 11th year under head coach Bobby Dodd, the team compiled an overall record of 9–1–1, with a mark of 4–1–1 in conference play, and finished third in the SEC.

Early victories over Miami (FL) and Florida had Georgia Tech eyeing the Southeastern Conference crown and a possible national championship. But the Yellow Jackets were upset by Auburn at home, their first loss to the Tigers since 1940. Another setback, a tie to Tennessee, kept them from sharing the SEC title with Ole Miss. They finished the regular season ranked 7th in the AP Poll, and accepted an invitation to the 1956 Sugar Bowl, where they defeated Pittsburgh, 7–0.

== Schedule ==
Date	Opponent	Rank	Site	TV	Result	Attendance	Source
September 17	No. 9 Miami (FL)*	No. 10	Grant Field; Atlanta, GA	NBC	W 14–6	39,500	
September 24	at No. 19 Florida	No. 2	Florida Field; Gainesville, FL		W 14–7	40,000	
October 1	SMU*	No. 3	Grant Field; Atlanta, GA		W 20–7	34,000	
October 8	at LSU	No. 4	Tiger Stadium; Baton Rouge, LA		W 7–0	60,000	
October 15	No. 17 Auburn	No. 5	Grant Field; Atlanta, GA (rivalry)		L 12–14	40,000	
October 22	Florida State*	No. 13	Grant Field; Atlanta, GA		W 34–0	30,000	
October 29	No. 17 Duke*^{†}	No. 12	Grant Field; Atlanta, GA		W 27–0	40,000	
November 5	at Tennessee	No. 8	Shields–Watkins Field; Knoxville, TN (rivalry)		T 7–7	50,000	
November 12	at Alabama	No. 11	Legion Field; Birmingham, AL (rivalry)		W 26–2	38,000	
November 26	Georgia	No. 9	Grant Field; Atlanta, GA (rivalry)		W 21–3	40,000	
January 2	vs. No. 11 Pittsburgh*	No. 7	Tulane Stadium; New Orleans, LA (Sugar Bowl)	ABC	W 7–0	76,535–80,175	
*Non-conference game; ^{†}Homecoming; Rankings from AP Poll released prior to the game
