= 1955 LSU Tigers football team =

American college football season

1955 LSU Tigers football
- Conference: Southeastern Conference
- Record: 3–5–2 (2–3–1 SEC)
- Head coach: Paul Dietzel (1st season)
- Home stadium: Tiger Stadium

1955 Southeastern Conference football standings
	Conf.					Overall
Team	W		L		T	W		L		T
No. 10 Ole Miss $	5	–	1	–	0	10	–	1	–	0
No. 8 Auburn	5	–	2	–	1	8	–	2	–	1
No. 7 Georgia Tech	4	–	1	–	1	9	–	1	–	1
Tennessee	3	–	2	–	1	6	–	3	–	1
Vanderbilt	4	–	3	–	0	8	–	3	–	0
Mississippi State	4	–	4	–	0	6	–	4	–	0
Kentucky	3	–	3	–	1	6	–	3	–	1
Tulane	3	–	3	–	1	5	–	4	–	1
LSU	2	–	3	–	1	3	–	5	–	2
Florida	3	–	5	–	0	4	–	6	–	0
Georgia	2	–	5	–	0	4	–	6	–	0
Alabama	0	–	7	–	0	0	–	10	–	0
$ – Conference champion; Rankings from AP Poll

The 1955 LSU Tigers football team was an American football team that represented Louisiana State University (LSU) as a member of the Southeastern Conference (SEC) during the 1955 college football season. In their first year under head coach Paul Dietzel, the Tigers compiled an overall record of 3–5–2, with a conference record of 2–3–1, and finished ninth in the SEC.

== Schedule ==
Date	Opponent	Rank	Site	Result	Attendance	Source
September 17	Kentucky		Tiger Stadium; Baton Rouge, LA	W 19–7		
September 24	vs. Texas A&M*	No. 16	Cotton Bowl; Dallas, TX (rivalry)	L 0–28	17,000	
October 1	at No. 11 Rice*		Rice Stadium; Houston, TX	T 20–20	51,000	
October 8	No. 4 Georgia Tech		Tiger Stadium; Baton Rouge, LA	L 0–7	60,000	
October 15	at Florida		Florida Field; Gainesville, FL (rivalry)	L 14–18	30,000	
October 29	Ole Miss		Tiger Stadium; Baton Rouge, LA (rivalry)	L 26–29	43,000	
November 5	at No. 1 Maryland*		Byrd Stadium; College Park, MD	L 0–13	28,000	
November 12	No. 18 Mississippi State^{†}		Tiger Stadium; Baton Rouge, LA (rivalry)	W 34–7		
November 19	at Arkansas*		War Memorial Stadium; Little Rock, AR (rivalry)	W 13–7	35,000	
November 26	Tulane		Tiger Stadium; Baton Rouge, LA (Battle for the Rag)	T 13–13	55,000	
*Non-conference game; ^{†}Homecoming; Rankings from AP Poll released prior to the game
