= 1955 Georgia Bulldogs football team =

American college football season

1955 Georgia Bulldogs football
- Conference: Southeastern Conference
- Record: 4–6 (2–5 SEC)
- Head coach: Wally Butts (17th season)
- Home stadium: Sanford Stadium

1955 Southeastern Conference football standings
| | Conf. | | | | | Overall |
| Team | W | | L | | T | W | | L | | T |
|---|---|---|---|---|---|---|---|---|---|---|
| No. 10 Ole Miss $ | 5 | – | 1 | – | 0 | 10 | – | 1 | – | 0 |
| No. 8 Auburn | 5 | – | 2 | – | 1 | 8 | – | 2 | – | 1 |
| No. 7 Georgia Tech | 4 | – | 1 | – | 1 | 9 | – | 1 | – | 1 |
| Tennessee | 3 | – | 2 | – | 1 | 6 | – | 3 | – | 1 |
| Vanderbilt | 4 | – | 3 | – | 0 | 8 | – | 3 | – | 0 |
| Mississippi State | 4 | – | 4 | – | 0 | 6 | – | 4 | – | 0 |
| Kentucky | 3 | – | 3 | – | 1 | 6 | – | 3 | – | 1 |
| Tulane | 3 | – | 3 | – | 1 | 5 | – | 4 | – | 1 |
| LSU | 2 | – | 3 | – | 1 | 3 | – | 5 | – | 2 |
| Florida | 3 | – | 5 | – | 0 | 4 | – | 6 | – | 0 |
| Georgia | 2 | – | 5 | – | 0 | 4 | – | 6 | – | 0 |
| Alabama | 0 | – | 7 | – | 0 | 0 | – | 10 | – | 0 |
$ – Conference champion; Rankings from AP Poll

The 1955 Georgia Bulldogs football team was an American football team that represented the University of Georgia as a member of the Southeastern Conference (SEC) during the 1955 college football season. In their 17th year under head coach Wally Butts, the Bulldogs compiled an overall record of 4–6, with a conference record of 2–5, and finished 11th in the SEC.

== Schedule ==
| Date | Opponent | Site | Result | Attendance | Source |
|---|---|---|---|---|---|
| September 17 | vs. No. 15 Ole Miss | Grant Field; Atlanta, GA | L 13–26 | 36,000 | |
| September 24 | Vanderbilt | Sanford Stadium; Athens, GA (rivalry) | W 14–13 | 20,000 | |
| October 1 | at Clemson* | Memorial Stadium; Clemson, SC (rivalry) | L 7–26 | 20,000 | |
| October 8 | North Carolina* | Sanford Stadium; Athens, GA | W 28–7 | 25,000 | |
| October 15 | at Florida State* | Doak Campbell Stadium; Tallahassee, FL | W 47–14 | 18,687 | |
| October 22 | Tulane | Sanford Stadium; Athens, GA | L 0–14 | | |
| October 29 | Alabama^{†} | Sanford Stadium; Athens, GA (rivalry) | W 35–14 | 28,000 | |
| November 5 | vs. Florida | Gator Bowl Stadium; Jacksonville, FL (rivalry) | L 13–19 | 37,000 | |
| November 12 | vs. No. 12 Auburn | Memorial Stadium; Columbus, GA (rivalry) | L 13–16 | | |
| November 26 | at No. 9 Georgia Tech | Grant Field; Atlanta, GA (rivalry) | L 3–21 | 40,000 | |
*Non-conference game; ^{†}Homecoming; Rankings from AP Poll released prior to the game
