= 1955 Auburn Tigers football team =

American college football season

1955 Auburn Tigers football

Gator Bowl, L 13–25 vs. Vanderbilt
- Conference: Southeastern Conference

Ranking
- Coaches: No. 8
- AP: No. 8
- Record: 8–2–1 (5–2–1 SEC)
- Head coach: Ralph Jordan (5th season)
- Home stadium: Cliff Hare Stadium; Legion Field; Ladd–Peebles Stadium

1955 Southeastern Conference football standings
| | Conf. | | | | | Overall |
| Team | W | | L | | T | W | | L | | T |
|---|---|---|---|---|---|---|---|---|---|---|
| No. 10 Ole Miss $ | 5 | – | 1 | – | 0 | 10 | – | 1 | – | 0 |
| No. 8 Auburn | 5 | – | 2 | – | 1 | 8 | – | 2 | – | 1 |
| No. 7 Georgia Tech | 4 | – | 1 | – | 1 | 9 | – | 1 | – | 1 |
| Tennessee | 3 | – | 2 | – | 1 | 6 | – | 3 | – | 1 |
| Vanderbilt | 4 | – | 3 | – | 0 | 8 | – | 3 | – | 0 |
| Mississippi State | 4 | – | 4 | – | 0 | 6 | – | 4 | – | 0 |
| Kentucky | 3 | – | 3 | – | 1 | 6 | – | 3 | – | 1 |
| Tulane | 3 | – | 3 | – | 1 | 5 | – | 4 | – | 1 |
| LSU | 2 | – | 3 | – | 1 | 3 | – | 5 | – | 2 |
| Florida | 3 | – | 5 | – | 0 | 4 | – | 6 | – | 0 |
| Georgia | 2 | – | 5 | – | 0 | 4 | – | 6 | – | 0 |
| Alabama | 0 | – | 7 | – | 0 | 0 | – | 10 | – | 0 |
$ – Conference champion; Rankings from AP Poll

The 1955 Auburn Tigers football team represented Auburn University in the 1955 college football season. It was the Tigers' 64th overall and 23rd season as a member of the Southeastern Conference (SEC). The team was led by head coach Ralph "Shug" Jordan, in his fifth year, and played their home games at Cliff Hare Stadium in Auburn and Legion Field in Birmingham, Alabama and Ladd–Peebles Stadium in Mobile, Alabama. They finished with a record of eight wins, two losses and one tie (8–2–1 overall, 5–2–1 in the SEC) and with a loss to Vanderbilt in the Gator Bowl.

== Schedule ==
| Date | Opponent | Rank | Site | Result | Attendance | Source |
|---|---|---|---|---|---|---|
| September 24 | Chattanooga* | | Cliff Hare Stadium; Auburn, AL | W 15–6 | 15,000 | |
| October 1 | Florida | | Cliff Hare Stadium; Auburn, AL (rivalry) | W 13–0 | 26,000 | |
| October 8 | No. 19 Kentucky | No. 14 | Legion Field; Birmingham, AL | T 14–14 | 35,000 | |
| October 15 | at No. 5 Georgia Tech | No. 17 | Grant Field; Atlanta, GA (rivalry) | W 14–12 | | |
| October 22 | Furman* | No. 9 | Cliff Hare Stadium; Auburn, AL | W 52–0 | | |
| October 29 | at Tulane | No. 8 | Tulane Stadium; New Orleans, LA (rivalry) | L 13–27 | 35,000 | |
| November 5 | No. 20 Mississippi State^{†} | No. 14 | Cliff Hare Stadium; Auburn, AL | W 27–26 | 34,000 | |
| November 12 | vs. Georgia | No. 12 | Memorial Stadium; Columbus, GA (rivalry) | W 16–13 | | |
| November 19 | Clemson* | No. 12 | Ladd Memorial Stadium; Mobile, AL (rivalry) | W 21–0 | | |
| November 26 | vs. Alabama | No. 10 | Legion Field; Birmingham, AL (Iron Bowl) | W 26–0 | 44,000 | |
| December 31 | vs. Vanderbilt | No. 8 | Gator Bowl Stadium; Jacksonville, FL (Gator Bowl) | L 13–25 | 32,174 | |
*Non-conference game; ^{†}Homecoming; Rankings from AP Poll released prior to the game
