= 1955 Ole Miss Rebels football team =

American college football season

1955 Ole Miss Rebels football

SEC champion Cotton Bowl Classic champion

Cotton Bowl Classic, W 14–13 vs. TCU
- Conference: Southeastern Conference

Ranking
- Coaches: No. 9
- AP: No. 10
- Record: 10–1 (5–1 SEC)
- Head coach: Johnny Vaught (9th season)
- Captain: Buddy Alliston
- Home stadium: Hemingway Stadium

1955 Southeastern Conference football standings
	Conf.					Overall
Team	W		L		T	W		L		T
No. 10 Ole Miss $	5	–	1	–	0	10	–	1	–	0
No. 8 Auburn	5	–	2	–	1	8	–	2	–	1
No. 7 Georgia Tech	4	–	1	–	1	9	–	1	–	1
Tennessee	3	–	2	–	1	6	–	3	–	1
Vanderbilt	4	–	3	–	0	8	–	3	–	0
Mississippi State	4	–	4	–	0	6	–	4	–	0
Kentucky	3	–	3	–	1	6	–	3	–	1
Tulane	3	–	3	–	1	5	–	4	–	1
LSU	2	–	3	–	1	3	–	5	–	2
Florida	3	–	5	–	0	4	–	6	–	0
Georgia	2	–	5	–	0	4	–	6	–	0
Alabama	0	–	7	–	0	0	–	10	–	0
$ – Conference champion; Rankings from AP Poll

The 1955 Ole Miss Rebels football team represented the University of Mississippi during the 1955 college football season. The Rebels were led by ninth-year head coach Johnny Vaught and played their home games at Hemingway Stadium in Oxford, Mississippi (and one alternate site game in Jackson, Mississippi). Ole Miss was champion of the Southeastern Conference for the second consecutive season, finishing the regular season with a record of 9–1 (5–1 SEC), ranked 10th in the final AP Poll. They were invited to the 1956 Cotton Bowl Classic, where they defeated TCU, 14–13.

== Schedule ==
Date	Opponent	Rank	Site	TV	Result	Attendance	Source
September 17	at Georgia	No. 15	Grant Field; Atlanta, GA		W 26–13	36,000	
September 24	at Kentucky	No. 8	McLean Stadium; Lexington, KY		L 14–21	35,000	
October 1	North Texas State*		Hemingway Stadium; Oxford, MS		W 33–0		
October 8	vs. Vanderbilt		Crump Stadium; Memphis, TN (rivalry)		W 13–0	23,207	
October 15	at Tulane		Tulane Stadium; New Orleans, LA (rivalry)		W 27–13	25,000	
October 22	Arkansas*^{†}		Hemingway Stadium; Oxford, MS (rivalry)		W 17–7	30,000	
October 29	at LSU	No. 20	Tiger Stadium; Baton Rouge, LA (rivalry)		W 29–26	43,000	
November 5	at Memphis State*	No. 15	Crump Stadium; Memphis, TN (rivalry)		W 39–6		
November 12	Houston*	No. 14	Mississippi Veterans Memorial Stadium; Jackson, MS		W 27–11	20,000	
November 26	at Mississippi State	No. 15	Scott Field; Starkville, MS (Egg Bowl)		W 26–0	36,000	
January 2	vs. No. 7 TCU*	No. 15	Cotton Bowl; Dallas, TX (Cotton Bowl Classic)	NBC	W 14–13	75,500	
*Non-conference game; ^{†}Homecoming; Rankings from AP Poll released prior to the game

== Roster ==
- OL Buddy Alliston
- FB Paige Cothren
- OL Ed Crawford
- QB Eagle Day
- FB Billy Kinard
- Billy Lott
- OL Bill Yelverton

== Coaching staff ==
- Ray Poole (assistant)
