= 1955 Alabama Crimson Tide football team =

American college football season

1955 Alabama Crimson Tide football
- Conference: Southeastern Conference
- Record: 0–10 (0–7 SEC)
- Head coach: Jennings B. Whitworth (1st season)
- Captain: Nick Germanos
- Home stadium: Denny Stadium; Legion Field; Ladd Stadium

1955 Southeastern Conference football standings
	Conf.					Overall
Team	W		L		T	W		L		T
No. 10 Ole Miss $	5	–	1	–	0	10	–	1	–	0
No. 8 Auburn	5	–	2	–	1	8	–	2	–	1
No. 7 Georgia Tech	4	–	1	–	1	9	–	1	–	1
Tennessee	3	–	2	–	1	6	–	3	–	1
Vanderbilt	4	–	3	–	0	8	–	3	–	0
Mississippi State	4	–	4	–	0	6	–	4	–	0
Kentucky	3	–	3	–	1	6	–	3	–	1
Tulane	3	–	3	–	1	5	–	4	–	1
LSU	2	–	3	–	1	3	–	5	–	2
Florida	3	–	5	–	0	4	–	6	–	0
Georgia	2	–	5	–	0	4	–	6	–	0
Alabama	0	–	7	–	0	0	–	10	–	0
$ – Conference champion; Rankings from AP Poll

The 1955 Alabama Crimson Tide football team (variously "Alabama", "UA" or "Bama") represented the University of Alabama in the 1955 college football season. It was the Crimson Tide's 61st overall and 22nd season as a member of the Southeastern Conference (SEC). The team was led by head coach Jennings B. Whitworth, in his first year, and played their home games at Denny Stadium in Tuscaloosa, Legion Field in Birmingham and at Ladd Stadium in Mobile, Alabama. They finished winless with a record of zero wins and ten losses (0–10 overall, 0–7 in the SEC).

On December 2, 1954, Harold Drew resigned as head coach of the Crimson Tide, and Jennings B. Whitworth was introduced as his successor. Whitworth brought a new system that was more oriented towards the running game. As a result, senior quarterback Bart Starr and the other Tide seniors saw little playing time. Whitworth, for his part, was allowed to hire only two assistants and required to retain the rest of Coach Drew's staff.

Alabama football hit rock bottom in 1955, going 0–10, the worst season in school history. It was only the third winless season in the history of the Crimson Tide, the others being the 0–4 teams in 1893 and 1895 when the program was just starting. For the season, Alabama averaged only 4.8 points per game and the opposition averaged 25.6. The Tide was shut out four times, the opposition never scored fewer than 20 points, and the smallest margin of defeat was 15 points in a 21–6 loss to Vanderbilt.

== Schedule ==
Date	Opponent	Site	Result	Attendance	Source
September 24	at No. 13 Rice*	Rice Stadium; Houston, TX	L 0–20	50,000	
October 1	at Vanderbilt	Dudley Field; Nashville, TN	L 6–21	27,500	
October 8	No. 8 TCU*	Denny Stadium; Tuscaloosa, AL	L 0–21	20,000	
October 15	Tennessee	Legion Field; Birmingham, AL (Third Saturday in October)	L 0–20	35,000	
October 22	Mississippi State^{†}	Denny Stadium; Tuscaloosa, AL (rivalry)	L 7–26	28,000	
October 29	at Georgia	Sanford Stadium; Athens, GA (rivalry)	L 14–35	29,000	
November 5	Tulane	Ladd Stadium; Mobile, AL	L 7–27	17,301	
November 12	No. 11 Georgia Tech	Legion Field; Birmingham, AL (rivalry)	L 2–26	38,000	
November 18	at Miami (FL)*	Burdine Stadium; Miami, FL	L 12–34	35,414	
November 26	vs. No. 10 Auburn	Legion Field; Birmingham, AL (Iron Bowl)	L 0–26	45,000	
*Non-conference game; ^{†}Homecoming; Rankings from AP Poll released prior to the game

== Game summaries ==
=== Rice ===
Team	1	2	3	4	Total
Alabama	0	0	0	0	0
• #13 Rice	0	0	0	20	20

- Date: September 24
- Location: Rice Stadium
  Houston, TX
- Game attendance: 50,000

To open the 1955 season, the Crimson Tide traveled to Houston and were shutout 20–0 by the Rice Owls of the Southwest Conference. After being held scoreless for the first three quarters, the Owls scored all three of their touchdowns in the fourth quarter. King Hill scored first on a one-yard run, a 45-yard Page Rogers run and on a two-yard Hill run.

=== Vanderbilt ===
Team	1	2	3	4	Total
Alabama	0	6	0	0	6
• Vanderbilt	0	7	7	7	21

- Date: October 1
- Location: Dudley Field
  Nashville, TN
- Game attendance: 27,500

At Dudley Field, the Crimson Tide were defeated by the Vanderbilt Commodores 21–6 to open conference play.

=== TCU ===
Team	1	2	3	4	Total
• #8 TCU	0	0	14	7	21
Alabama	0	0	0	0	0

- Date: October 8
- Location: Denny Stadium
  Tuscaloosa, AL
- Game attendance: 20,000

In their home opener for the 1955 season, the Crimson Tide were shutout by the Texas Christian University (TCU) Horned Frogs 21–0 at Denny Stadium in what was the first all-time meeting between the schools. After a scoreless first half, Jim Swink scored all three of the Frogs' touchdowns in the second half. The scores came on runs of 65 and three-yards in the third and on a 10-yard run in the fourth quarter.

=== Tennessee ===
Third Saturday in October

Team	1	2	3	4	Total
• Tennessee	0	7	0	13	20
Alabama	0	0	0	0	0

- Date: October 15
- Location: Legion Field
  Birmingham, AL
- Game attendance: 35,000

In their annual rivalry game against Tennessee, Alabama was shut out for the third time in four weeks, and lost to the Volunteers, 20–0, at Legion Field. After a scoreless first quarter, the Vols took a 7–0 halftime lead after Johnny Majors threw a nine-yard touchdown pass to Roger Urbano on a fourth-down play early in the second quarter. A pair of touchdown runs in the fourth quarter, by Majors from two yards out and by Lon Herzbrun from one yard out, made the final score 20–0 in favor of the visitors.

=== Mississippi State ===
Team	1	2	3	4	Total
• Mississippi State	6	7	7	6	26
Alabama	0	7	0	0	7

- Date: October 22
- Location: Denny Stadium
  Tuscaloosa, AL
- Game attendance: 28,000

On homecoming in Tuscaloosa, the Crimson Tide were defeated for the second consecutive year by the Mississippi State Maroons 26–7 at Denny Stadium. The first State touchdown was set up after the Maroons recovered a fumble at their 37-yard line. Bill Stanton scored on a one-yard run five plays later to give State a 6–0 lead. In the second quarter, William Morgan scored on a nine-yard run for the Maroons, but Alabama answered with a one-yard Clay Walls touchdown run to make the halftime score 13–7. State then pulled away in the second half to win 26–7 after 14-yard Morgan run in the third and on a 27-yard Stanton pass to Morgan in the fourth.

=== Georgia ===
Team	1	2	3	4	Total
Alabama	0	0	7	7	14
• Georgia	7	7	7	14	35

- Date: October 29
- Location: Sanford Stadium
  Athens, GA
- Game attendance: 29,000

At Athens, the Crimson Tide lost to the Georgia Bulldogs 35–14 on homecoming at Sanford Stadium. The Bulldogs took a 14–0 halftime lead after James Harper threw a 25-yard touchdown pass to Laneair Roberts in the first and on a one-yard Robert Garrard run in the second quarter. The Tide then scored the first touchdown of the second half on a six-yard Donald Kinderknecht run to cut the Georgia lead to 14–7. However, the Bulldogs responded with a three-yard Henry Dukes run to make the score 21–7 at the start of the fourth. In the final quarter, Conrad Manisera scored on a four-yard run and on a one-yard John Bell run for Georgia and on a one-yard Bart Starr run for Alabama.

=== Tulane ===
Team	1	2	3	4	Total
• Tulane	7	0	7	13	27
Alabama	0	7	0	0	7

- Date: November 5
- Location: Ladd Stadium
  Mobile, AL
- Game attendance: 17,301

Playing their annual home game at Ladd Stadium, the Crimson Tide lost 27–7 to the Tulane Green Wave in Mobile. The game was tied 7–7 at halftime after Tulane scored on a 12-yard Al Cottrell run in the first and Alabama scored on a short Billy Lumpkin run in the second quarter. After a one-yard Ronald Quillian run in the third to give Tulane a 14–7 lead, the Green Wave closed the game with a pair of fourth-quarter touchdowns o win 27–7. The fourth quarter scored were made by Quillian on a five-yard run and by Cottrell on a 17-yard interception return.

=== Georgia Tech ===
Team	1	2	3	4	Total
• #11 Georgia Tech	12	7	0	7	26
Alabama	0	0	0	2	2

- Date: November 12
- Location: Legion Field
  Birmingham, AL
- Game attendance: 38,000

Against Georgia Tech, Alabama lost their eleventh consecutive game in this 26–2 defeat by the Yellow Jackets at Legion Field. Tech took a 12–0 first quarter lead after they scored a pair of touchdowns in a 19-second span. The first came on a five-yard Richard Mattison run and the second on a 28-yard Kenny Thompson interception return. The Yellow Jackets' third score was set up early in the second quarter after Thomas Rose blocked an Alabama punt at the Tide's 12-yard line. Two plays later, Tech took a 19–0 lead after Paul Rotenberry scored on a five-yard run. After a scoreless third, in the fourth quarter Tech scored their final touchdown on a 34-yard Ronald Vann pass to Marion Ellis and Alabama got their only points on a safety in the final minute to make the score 26–2.

=== Miami (FL) ===
Team	1	2	3	4	Total
Alabama	0	6	0	6	12
• Miami	14	0	13	7	34

- Date: November 18
- Location: Burdine Stadium
  Miami, FL
- Game attendance: 35,414

On a Friday evening in Miami for the second consecutive year, Alabama was defeated by the Miami Hurricanes 34–12 at Burdine Stadium. The Hurricanes took a 14–0 first quarter lead on touchdowns scored by Don Bosseler on a four-yard run and by Whitey Rouviere on a 25-yard run. The Crimson Tide responded in the second quarter with a Donald Kinderknecht touchdown run to make the halftime score 14–6. Bosseler then gave Miami a 27–6 lead in the third quarter with his touchdown runs of two and 14-yards. In the fourth quarter, Bart Starr threw a seven-yard touchdown pass to Roy Forbus for Alabama and Ed Oliver scored on a four-yard touchdown run for Miami to make the final score 34–12.

=== Auburn ===
Iron Bowl

Team	1	2	3	4	Total
• #10 Auburn	0	13	0	13	26
Alabama	0	0	0	0	0

- Date: November 26
- Location: Legion Field
  Birmingham, AL
- Game attendance: 45,000

For the second consecutive year, Alabama was shutout by the rival Auburn Tigers 26–0 at Legion Field and finished the season winless. After a scoreless first quarter, the Tigers took a 13–0 halftime lead with second quarter passes of 23 and 10-yards from Howell Tubbs to Jerry Elliott. Auburn then closed the game with a pair of fourth-quarter touchdowns on pair of short runs by Joe Childress and Tubbs to win 26–0.

== Personnel ==
=== Varsity letter winners ===
Player	Hometown	Position
Jimmy Bowdoin	Elba, Alabama	Halfback
William Brooks	Tuscaloosa, Alabama	Center
Marshall Brown	Ladysmith, Wisconsin	Fullback
Knute Christian	Tuscaloosa, Alabama	Center
Don Connor	Gadsden, Alabama	Center
Dan Joseph Coyle	Birmingham, Alabama	End
Jim Cunningham	Winfield, Alabama	Tackle
Alvin Ellett	Owens Crossroads, Alabama	Tackle
Albert Elmore	Troy, Alabama	Quarterback
Nicholas Germanos	Montgomery, Alabama	End
Glen Graham	Florence, Alabama	Center
William Hollis	Biloxi, Mississippi	Halfback
Max Kelley	Cullman, Alabama	Fullback
Donald Kinderknecht	Hays, Kansas	Fullback
Billy Lumpkin	Florence, Alabama	Halfback
Curtis Lynch	Wadley, Alabama	End
Jerry McBee	Birmingham, Alabama	Halfback
John Poole	Florence, Alabama	End
Douglas Potts	Evergreen, Alabama	Guard
James Pritchett	Birmingham, Alabama	End
Bart Starr	Montgomery, Alabama	Quarterback
William Stone	Yukon, West Virginia	Fullback
Wesley Thompson	Decatur, Alabama	Tackle
Louis Veazy	Alexander City, Alabama	Guard
Noojin Walker	Falkville, Alabama	Fullback
Clay Walls	Bessemer, Alabama	Halfback
Sid Youngelman	Newark, New Jersey	Tackle

=== Coaching staff ===
Name	Position	Seasons at Alabama	Alma mater
Jennings B. Whitworth	Head coach	1	Alabama (1932)
Butch Avinger	Assistant coach	2	Alabama (1951)
Lew Bostick	Assistant coach	12	Alabama (1939)
Tilden Campbell	Assistant coach	16	Alabama (1935)
Hank Crisp	Assistant coach	28	VPI (1920)
Howard "Moose" Johnson	Assistant coach	1	Georgia (1948)
Joe Kilgrow	Assistant coach	12	Alabama (1937)
Malcolm Laney	Assistant coach	12	Alabama (1932)
James Nisbet	Assistant coach	7	Alabama (1937)
Joe Thomas	Assistant coach	1	Oklahoma A&M (1947)
