= 1955 Tennessee Volunteers football team =

American college football season

1955 Tennessee Volunteers football
- Conference: Southeastern Conference
- Record: 6–3–1 (3–2–1 SEC)
- Head coach: Bowden Wyatt (1st season)
- Home stadium: Shields–Watkins Field

1955 Southeastern Conference football standings
| | Conf. | | | | | Overall |
| Team | W | | L | | T | W | | L | | T |
|---|---|---|---|---|---|---|---|---|---|---|
| No. 10 Ole Miss $ | 5 | – | 1 | – | 0 | 10 | – | 1 | – | 0 |
| No. 8 Auburn | 5 | – | 2 | – | 1 | 8 | – | 2 | – | 1 |
| No. 7 Georgia Tech | 4 | – | 1 | – | 1 | 9 | – | 1 | – | 1 |
| Tennessee | 3 | – | 2 | – | 1 | 6 | – | 3 | – | 1 |
| Vanderbilt | 4 | – | 3 | – | 0 | 8 | – | 3 | – | 0 |
| Mississippi State | 4 | – | 4 | – | 0 | 6 | – | 4 | – | 0 |
| Kentucky | 3 | – | 3 | – | 1 | 6 | – | 3 | – | 1 |
| Tulane | 3 | – | 3 | – | 1 | 5 | – | 4 | – | 1 |
| LSU | 2 | – | 3 | – | 1 | 3 | – | 5 | – | 2 |
| Florida | 3 | – | 5 | – | 0 | 4 | – | 6 | – | 0 |
| Georgia | 2 | – | 5 | – | 0 | 4 | – | 6 | – | 0 |
| Alabama | 0 | – | 7 | – | 0 | 0 | – | 10 | – | 0 |
$ – Conference champion; Rankings from AP Poll

The 1955 Tennessee Volunteers (variously Tennessee, UT, or the Vols) represented the University of Tennessee in the 1955 college football season. Playing as a member of the Southeastern Conference (SEC), the team was led by head coach Bowden Wyatt, in his first year, and played their home games at Shields–Watkins Field in Knoxville, Tennessee. They finished the season with a record of six wins, three losses and one tie (6–3–1 overall, 3–2–1 in the SEC).

== Schedule ==
| Date | Opponent | Rank | Site | Result | Attendance | Source |
|---|---|---|---|---|---|---|
| September 24 | Mississippi State | | Shields–Watkins Field; Knoxville, TN | L 7–13 | 16,500 | |
| October 1 | No. 16 Duke* | | Shields–Watkins Field; Knoxville, TN | L 0–21 | 25,500 | |
| October 8 | Chattanooga* | | Shields–Watkins Field; Knoxville, TN | W 13–0 | 13,500 | |
| October 15 | at Alabama | | Legion Field; Birmingham, AL (Third Saturday in October) | W 20–0 | 35,000 | |
| October 22 | Dayton* | | Shields–Watkins Field; Knoxville, TN | W 53–7 | | |
| October 29 | at North Carolina* | | Kenan Memorial Stadium; Chapel Hill, NC | W 48–7 | 18,000 | |
| November 5 | No. 8 Georgia Tech^{†} | | Shields–Watkins Field; Knoxville, TN (rivalry) | T 7–7 | 50,000 | |
| November 12 | at Florida | | Florida Field; Gainesville, FL (rivalry) | W 20–0 | 42,400 | |
| November 19 | at Kentucky | No. 17 | McLean Stadium; Lexington, KY (rivalry) | L 0–23 | 36,000 | |
| November 26 | No. 19 Vanderbilt | | Shields–Watkins Field; Knoxville, TN (rivalry) | W 20–14 | 40,000 | |
*Non-conference game; ^{†}Homecoming; Rankings from AP Poll released prior to the game

== Roster ==
- HB #45 Johnny Majors, Jr.

== Team players drafted into the NFL ==
| Player | Position | Round | Pick | NFL club |
|---|---|---|---|---|
| Tom Tracy | Back | 5 | 50 | Detroit Lions |
| Buddy Cruze | End | 12 | 143 | Chicago Bears |
