= Art Guepe =

American football player, coach, and administrator (1915–2001)

Biographical details
- Born: January 28, 1915; Milwaukee, Wisconsin, U.S.
- Died: November 4, 2001 (aged 86); Nashville, Tennessee, U.S.

Playing career
- 1934–1936: Marquette
- 1943: Iowa Pre-Flight
- Position: Quarterback

Coaching career (HC unless noted)
- 1937: Marquette (freshmen)
- 1938–1942: Virginia (assistant)
- 1946–1952: Virginia
- 1953–1962: Vanderbilt

Administrative career (AD unless noted)
- 1963–1975: OVC (commissioner)

Head coaching record
- Overall: 86–71–9
- Bowls: 1–0

Accomplishments and honors

Awards
- SEC Coach of the Year (1955)

Arthur Leo Guepe (January 28, 1915 – November 4, 2001) was an American college football player and coach. He served as the head coach at the University of Virginia from 1946 to 1952 and Vanderbilt University from 1953 to 1962, compiling a career head coaching record of 86–71–9.

== Playing and assistant coaching career ==
Guepe played quarterback at Marquette University from 1934 to 1936 in a backfield that included two-time All-American Ray Buivid, Ray Sonnenberg, and Arthur's twin brother, Albert Guepe. The Golden Avalanche compiled records of 7–1 in 1935 and 7–2 in 1936, the latter season concluding with a 16–6 loss to Sammy Baugh and TCU in the 1937 Cotton Bowl Classic. Guepe and his twin brother, Al, starred for Marquette from 1933 to 1936. In the TCU game, Guepe raced a punt back 60 yards for the first touchdown in Cotton Bowl history to give Marquette an early lead. He was drafted in the third round of the 1937 NFL Draft. After graduation, Guepe served one season as freshmen football and basketball coach at Marquette, and then moved to the University of Virginia as an assistant football coach from 1938 to 1942. Guepe served in the United States Navy during World War II and played one season in 1943 for the Iowa Pre-Flight Seahawks football team.

== Head coaching career ==
Guepe was the head coach of the Virginia Cavaliers football program from 1946 to 1952, having compiled a 47–17–2 (.727) record. His final three years were his best, winning eight games in each of those seasons. His '51 team finished 8–1 and ranked 13th in the nation.

Vanderbilt University lured Guepe from Virginia in 1953 and he coached the Commodores for ten seasons (1953–1962). Guepe's 1955 Vandy team, beat 8th-ranked Auburn in the Gator Bowl and finished 8–3. His Vandy teams won more Southeastern Conference games (19) than any Commodore coach before or since.

Upon retiring from coaching after the 1962 season, Guepe said matter-of-factly and without bitterness: "There is no way you can be Harvard Monday through Friday and try to be Alabama on Saturday." His message to the Vanderbilt chancellor and trustees was unambiguous. To be competitive in the arena of big-time college football, Vanderbilt would have to relax some of its high standards of admissions and academic eligibility. His son, Arthur A. Guepe, played football at Vanderbilt from 1961 to 1963.

== Later life and death ==
Guepe served as the Ohio Valley Conference's first commissioner from 1963 to 1975. Guepe died on November 4, 2001, at a nursing home in Florida.

== Head coaching record ==
Year	Team	Overall	Conference	Standing	Bowl/playoffs	AP^{#}
Virginia Cavaliers (Independent) (1946–1952)
1946	Virginia	4–4–1				
1947	Virginia	7–3				
1948	Virginia	5–3–1				
1949	Virginia	7–2				
1950	Virginia	8–2				
1951	Virginia	8–1				13
1952	Virginia	8–2				
Virginia:		47–17–2				
Vanderbilt Commodores (Southeastern Conference) (1953–1962)
1953	Vanderbilt	3–7	1–5	T–10th		
1954	Vanderbilt	2–7	1–5	T–11th		
1955	Vanderbilt	8–3	5–3	4th	W Gator	
1956	Vanderbilt	5–5	2–5	T–8th		
1957	Vanderbilt	5–3–2	3–3–1	T–6th		
1958	Vanderbilt	5–2–3	2–1–3	4th		
1959	Vanderbilt	5–3–2	3–2–2	T–5th		
1960	Vanderbilt	3–7	0–7	12th		
1961	Vanderbilt	2–8	1–6	12th		
1962	Vanderbilt	1–9	1–6	11th		
Vanderbilt:		39–54–7	19–43–6			
Total:		86–71–9				
^{#}Rankings from final AP Poll.
