= 1955 Tulane Green Wave football team =

American college football season

1955 Tulane Green Wave football
- Conference: Southeastern Conference
- Record: 5–4–1 (3–3–1 SEC)
- Head coach: Andy Pilney (2nd season)
- Home stadium: Tulane Stadium

1955 Southeastern Conference football standings
| | Conf. | | | | | Overall |
| Team | W | | L | | T | W | | L | | T |
|---|---|---|---|---|---|---|---|---|---|---|
| No. 10 Ole Miss $ | 5 | – | 1 | – | 0 | 10 | – | 1 | – | 0 |
| No. 8 Auburn | 5 | – | 2 | – | 1 | 8 | – | 2 | – | 1 |
| No. 7 Georgia Tech | 4 | – | 1 | – | 1 | 9 | – | 1 | – | 1 |
| Tennessee | 3 | – | 2 | – | 1 | 6 | – | 3 | – | 1 |
| Vanderbilt | 4 | – | 3 | – | 0 | 8 | – | 3 | – | 0 |
| Mississippi State | 4 | – | 4 | – | 0 | 6 | – | 4 | – | 0 |
| Kentucky | 3 | – | 3 | – | 1 | 6 | – | 3 | – | 1 |
| Tulane | 3 | – | 3 | – | 1 | 5 | – | 4 | – | 1 |
| LSU | 2 | – | 3 | – | 1 | 3 | – | 5 | – | 2 |
| Florida | 3 | – | 5 | – | 0 | 4 | – | 6 | – | 0 |
| Georgia | 2 | – | 5 | – | 0 | 4 | – | 6 | – | 0 |
| Alabama | 0 | – | 7 | – | 0 | 0 | – | 10 | – | 0 |
$ – Conference champion; Rankings from AP Poll

The 1955 Tulane Green Wave football team was an American football team that represented Tulane University during the 1955 college football season as a member of the Southeastern Conference (SEC). In its second year under head coach Andy Pilney, Tulane compiled a 5–4–1 record (3–3–1 in conference games), tied for seventh place in the SEC, and outscored opponents by a total of 163 to 136.

The Green Wave played its home games at Tulane Stadium in New Orleans.

== Schedule ==
| Date | Opponent | Site | Result | Attendance | Source |
|---|---|---|---|---|---|
| September 17 | VMI* | Tulane Stadium; New Orleans, LA | W 20–7 | | |
| September 24 | at Texas* | Memorial Stadium; Austin, TX | L 21–35 | 30,000 | |
| October 1 | Northwestern* | Tulane Stadium; New Orleans, LA | W 21–0 | 20,000 | |
| October 8 | at Mississippi State | Scott Field; Starkville, MS | L 0–14 | | |
| October 15 | Ole Miss | Tulane Stadium; New Orleans, LA (rivalry) | L 13–27 | 25,000 | |
| October 22 | at Georgia | Sanford Stadium; Athens, GA | W 14–0 | | |
| October 29 | No. 8 Auburn | Tulane Stadium; New Orleans, LA (rivalry) | W 27–13 | 35,000 | |
| November 5 | vs. Alabama | Ladd Memorial Stadium; Mobile, AL | W 27–7 | 17,301 | |
| November 12 | Vanderbilt | Tulane Stadium; New Orleans, LA | L 7–20 | | |
| November 26 | at LSU | Tiger Stadium; Baton Rouge, LA (Battle for the Rag) | T 13–13 | 55,000 | |
*Non-conference game; Rankings from AP Poll released prior to the game
