= 1955 Kentucky Wildcats football team =

American college football season

1955 Kentucky Wildcats football
- Conference: Southeastern Conference
- Record: 6–3–1 (3–3–1 SEC)
- Head coach: Blanton Collier (2nd season)
- Home stadium: McLean Stadium

1955 Southeastern Conference football standings
	Conf.					Overall
Team	W		L		T	W		L		T
No. 10 Ole Miss $	5	–	1	–	0	10	–	1	–	0
No. 8 Auburn	5	–	2	–	1	8	–	2	–	1
No. 7 Georgia Tech	4	–	1	–	1	9	–	1	–	1
Tennessee	3	–	2	–	1	6	–	3	–	1
Vanderbilt	4	–	3	–	0	8	–	3	–	0
Mississippi State	4	–	4	–	0	6	–	4	–	0
Kentucky	3	–	3	–	1	6	–	3	–	1
Tulane	3	–	3	–	1	5	–	4	–	1
LSU	2	–	3	–	1	3	–	5	–	2
Florida	3	–	5	–	0	4	–	6	–	0
Georgia	2	–	5	–	0	4	–	6	–	0
Alabama	0	–	7	–	0	0	–	10	–	0
$ – Conference champion; Rankings from AP Poll

The 1955 Kentucky Wildcats football team was an American football team that represented the University of Kentucky in the Southeastern Conference (SEC) during the 1955 college football season. In their second season under head coach Blanton Collier, the Wildcats compiled a 6–3–1 record (3–3–1 against SEC opponents), tied for seventh in the conference, and outscored opponents by a total of 178 to 131. The team played its home games at Stoll Field in Lexington, Kentucky.

== Schedule ==
Date	Opponent	Rank	Site	Result	Attendance	Source
September 17	at LSU		Tiger Stadium; Baton Rouge, LA	L 7–19		
September 24	No. 8 Ole Miss		Stoll Field; Lexington, KY	W 21–14	35,000	
October 1	Villanova*		Stoll Field; Lexington, KY	W 28–0	24,000	
October 8	at No. 14 Auburn	No. 19	Legion Field; Birmingham, AL	T 14–14	35,000	
October 15	Mississippi State	No. 20	Stoll Field; Lexington, KY	L 14–20		
October 22	Florida		Stoll Field; Lexington, KY (rivalry)	W 10–7		
October 29	Rice*		Stoll Field; Lexington, KY	W 20–16	33,000	
November 5	at Vanderbilt	No. 17	Dudley Field; Nashville, TN (rivalry)	L 0–34	28,000	
November 12	Memphis State*		Stoll Field; Lexington, KY	W 41–7		
November 19	at No. 17 Tennessee		Stoll Field; Knoxville, TN (rivalry)	W 23–0	36,000	
*Non-conference game; Rankings from AP Poll released prior to the game
