= Bobby Johnson =

American football player and coach (born 1951)

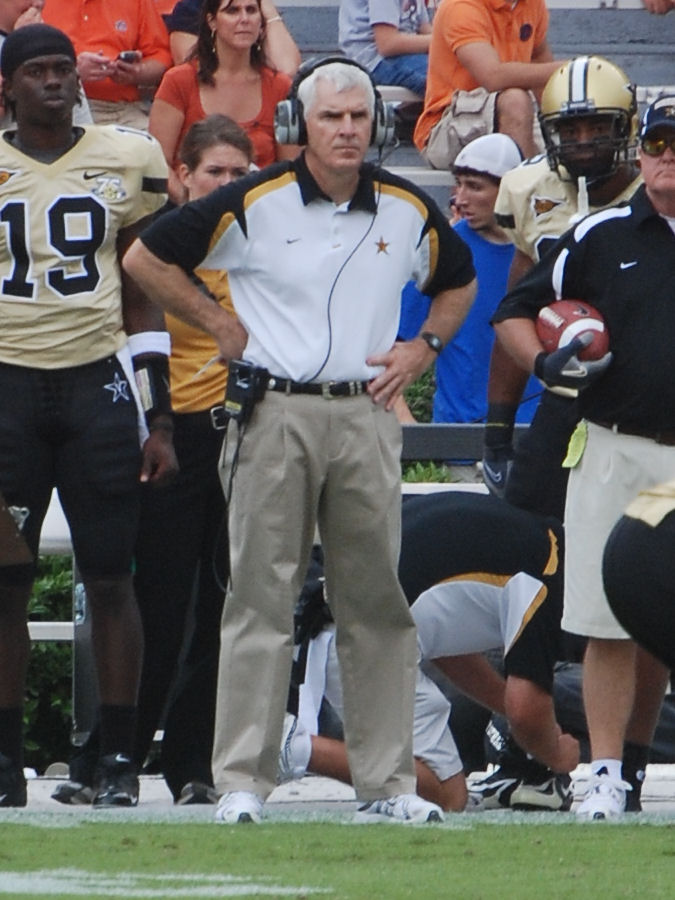
- Johnson in 2007

Biographical details
- Born: February 8, 1951 (age 75); Columbia, South Carolina, U.S.

Playing career
- 1969–1972: Clemson
- Positions: Wide receiver, cornerback

Coaching career (HC unless noted)
- 1976: Furman (DE)
- 1977–1979: Furman (DB)
- 1981–1983: Furman (DB)
- 1983–1992: Furman (DC)
- 1993: Clemson (DC)
- 1994–2001: Furman
- 2002–2009: Vanderbilt

Head coaching record
- Overall: 89–102
- Bowls: 1–0
- Tournaments: 3–3 (NCAA D-I-AA playoffs)

Accomplishments and honors

Championships
- 2 SoCon (1999, 2001)

Awards
- SEC Coach of the Year (2008)

Robert Alan Johnson (born February 8, 1951) is an American former college football coach and player. He was last the head football coach at Vanderbilt University, a position he held from the 2002 season until his retirement in 2010. In December 2001, Johnson became the Commodores' head coach, after leading Furman University to the NCAA Division I-AA national championship game. He coached the Paladins between 1994 and 2001, leading the team to a 60–36 overall record during his eight years. Prior to his hiring at Furman, Johnson was the defensive coordinator for the Clemson Tigers. In 2008, Johnson led Vanderbilt to its first winning season since 1982. His team went 7–6 with a 16–14 win over Boston College in the Music City Bowl, Vanderbilt's first bowl victory since 1955 and only their second in school history at the time.

== Playing career and education ==
Johnson was a standout in football, basketball, and baseball during his time at Eau Claire High School in his native hometown of Columbia, South Carolina.

He continued his success in football at college, where he played both wide receiver and cornerback for Clemson University. In the 1971 and 1972 seasons, Johnson led the Tigers in interceptions. Johnson was twice named as an ACC All-Academic honoree. He graduated from Clemson in 1973, earning his Bachelor of Science degree in management, before earning his master's degree in education from Furman in 1979.

== Coaching career ==
=== Vanderbilt ===
On December 23, 2001, Johnson was officially announced as the 25th head coach of the Vanderbilt Commodores football team.

==== 2005 ====
In Johnson's fourth season, the Commodores finished 5–6. Jay Cutler, the team's offensive captain that season, was drafted #11 overall by the Denver Broncos and named as starting quarterback during his rookie season.

==== 2006 ====
In the 2006 season, Vanderbilt fell to 4–8 after the loss of Cutler, but did beat Georgia at Sanford Stadium. In addition, Vanderbilt lost games to Ole Miss, Alabama, SEC West champion Arkansas, and eventual national champion Florida. After eight games Atlanta Journal-Constitution college football writer Tony Barnhart stated that Johnson "deserves some consideration" for SEC Coach of the Year, albeit based on a misstated record of 4–5 instead of 3–5.

Barnhart's 2006 postseason survey of ten former SEC coaches ranked the Vanderbilt job the least attractive in the SEC. Former Ole Miss coach Billy Brewer summarized Johnson's performance: "The tough thing about the Vanderbilt job is that you can improve a lot from year to year and still finish last in the SEC East. For what he has, I think Bobby Johnson does a heck of a coaching job."

==== 2007 ====
Johnson again led the Commodores to success in 2007, with SEC conference wins over Mississippi and South Carolina, ranked #6 at the time of the contest. Standing with a 5–5 record, the Commodores then squandered a 24–9 third-quarter lead against in-state rival Tennessee, losing 25–24 after a 49-yard Bryant Hahnfeldt field goal attempt that would have won the game glanced off the left upright. Concluding the season with an uninspired effort versus Wake Forest, Vanderbilt finished 5–7 and one win short of bowl eligibility.

==== 2008 ====
Vanderbilt started the 2008 season on a 5–0 run under Coach Johnson, including SEC wins at home against South Carolina and Auburn, and an SEC road win at Ole Miss. Vanderbilt's fifth game, an October 4 match up against Auburn, was historic for the Commodores for many reasons. Aside from being Vanderbilt's first game as a ranked team in many years, it was ESPN College Gameday's first ever appearance in Nashville, and the 14–13 win gave Vanderbilt its first 5–0 start since the World War II-shortened 1943 season. Vanderbilt would go on to defeat Kentucky to get the sixth win and bowl eligibility for the first time since 1982. The Commodores lost to Tennessee and Wake Forest to finish the regular season 6–6. On December 10, Johnson was named Southeastern Conference Coach of the Year, along with Houston Nutt, of Ole Miss, and Nick Saban, of Alabama. On December 31, Vanderbilt defeated Boston College in the Music City Bowl to secure a winning season and their first bowl victory since 1955.

==== Retirement ====
On July 14, 2010, Johnson announced his retirement from coaching. Citing it as a "personal decision", the decision was a surprise to the program and the media as it occurred less than two months away from the 2010–11 season. In explaining his decision, he stated: "Football is not life, but it's a way of life and it consumes your life. You only have so many years to live, and you want to see a different way."

His tenure at Vanderbilt was lauded for bringing a resurgence to a team that had long been dominated by its fellow members of the SEC, notably guiding the Commodores their first bowl game win in 53 years and first non-losing season since 1982.

On March 27, 2015, Johnson was added to the College Football Playoff selection committee, replacing Archie Manning.

== Head coaching record ==
Year	Team	Overall	Conference	Standing	Bowl/playoffs
Furman Paladins (Southern Conference) (1994–2001)
1994	Furman	3–8	2–6	6th	
1995	Furman	6–5	5–3	3rd	
1996	Furman	9–4	6–2	3rd	L NCAA Division I-AA Quarterfinal
1997	Furman	7–4	5–3	3rd	
1998	Furman	5–6	3–5	T–6th	
1999	Furman	9–3	7–1	T–1st	L NCAA Division I-AA First Round
2000	Furman	9–3	6–2	2nd	L NCAA Division I-AA First Round
2001	Furman	12–3	7–1	T–1st	L NCAA Division I-AA Championship
Furman:		60–36	41–23		
Vanderbilt Commodores (Southeastern Conference) (2002–2009)
2002	Vanderbilt	2–10	0–8	6th (Eastern)	
2003	Vanderbilt	2–10	1–7	T–5th (Eastern)	
2004	Vanderbilt	2–9	1–7	T–5th (Eastern)	
2005	Vanderbilt	5–6	3–5	T–4th (Eastern)	
2006	Vanderbilt	4–8	1–7	6th (Eastern)	
2007	Vanderbilt	5–7	2–6	6th (Eastern)	
2008	Vanderbilt	7–6	4–4	T–3rd (Eastern)	W Music City
2009	Vanderbilt	2–10	0–8	6th (Eastern)	
Vanderbilt:		29–66	12–52		
Total:		89–102			
National championship Conference title Conference division title or championship game berth
