= 2008 Music City Bowl =

2008 Gaylord Hotels Music City Bowl
- 11th Music City Bowl
Boston College Eagles	Vanderbilt Commodores
(9–4)	(6–6)
ACC	SEC
14	16
Head coach: Jeff Jagodzinski	Head coach: Bobby Johnson
AP / Coaches / BCS; NR / NR / 24
	1	2	3	4	Total
Boston College	0	7	0	7	14
Vanderbilt	6	0	7	3	16
- Date: December 31, 2008
- Season: 2008
- Stadium: LP Field
- Location: Nashville, Tennessee
- MVP: P Brett Upson, Vanderbilt
- Favorite: Boston College by 5
- Referee: Adrian Hill (C-USA)
- Attendance: 54,250
- Payout: US$1,700,000 per team

United States TV coverage
- Network: ESPN
- Announcers: Mark Jones, Bob Davie, Todd Harris
- Nielsen ratings: 2.4

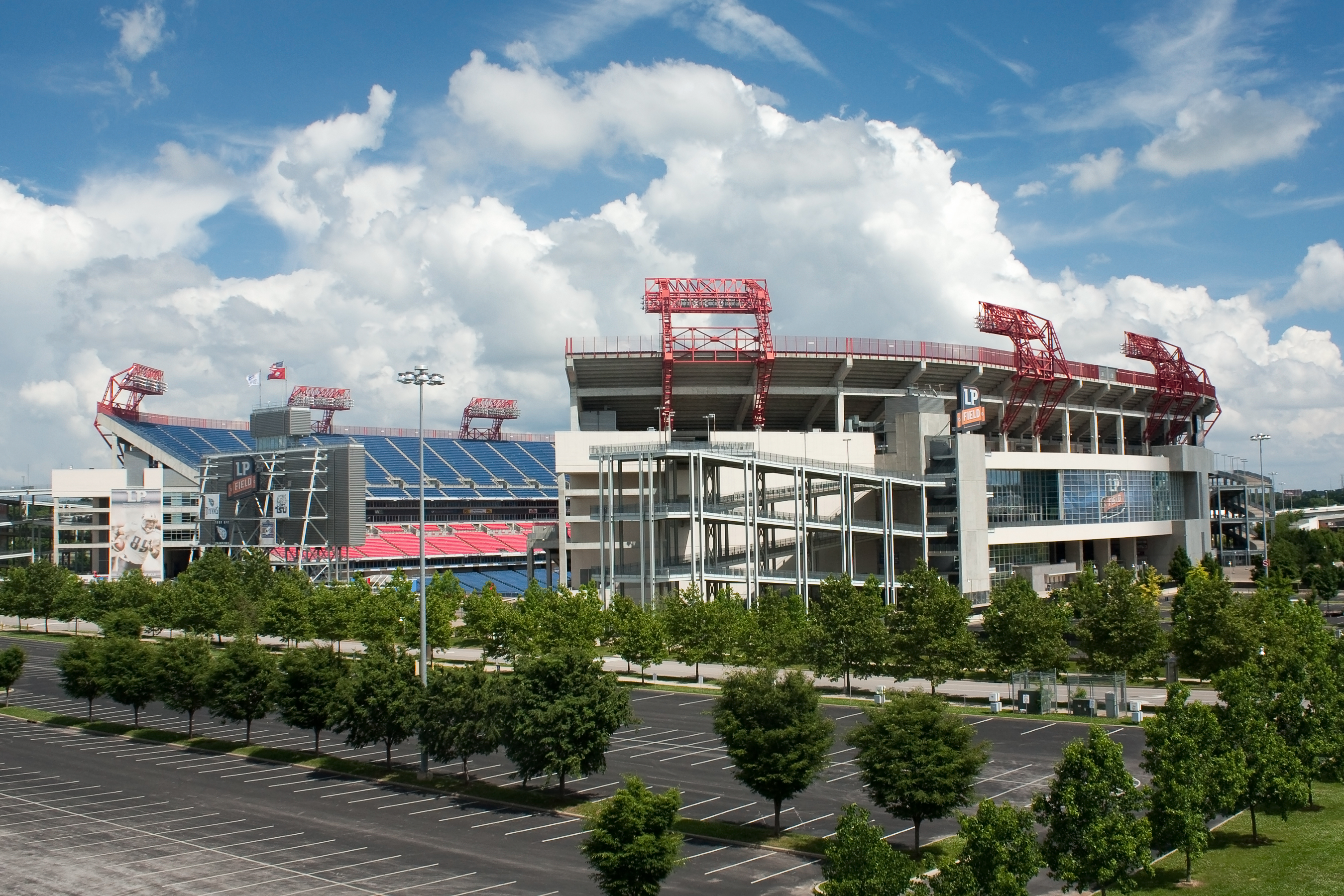
LP Field in Nashville, Tennessee, hosted the Music City Bowl.

The 2008 Music City Bowl was the eleventh edition of the college football bowl game played at LP Field in Nashville, Tennessee. The game started at 2:30 pm US CST (2030 UTC) on Wednesday, December 31, 2008. The game, telecast on ESPN, pitted the Boston College Eagles against the Vanderbilt Commodores. The Commodores, playing near their Nashville campus, won 16–14, earned their first bowl win in exactly 53 years, and completed their first winning season since 1982. Sponsored by Gaylord Hotels, it was officially named the Gaylord Hotels Music City Bowl.

== Preview ==
For the Eagles, this game was the culmination of their tenth consecutive season in a bowl game, a school record. They also entered the game on a streak of eight consecutive bowl wins, the best in Division I FBS. They ended the regular season on a four-game winning streak, but missed out on a chance to gain a BCS berth with a 30–12 loss to Virginia Tech in the ACC Championship Game. The Eagles still had a major milestone to play for, as a win would have given them a third consecutive 10-win season for the first time in school history.

Vanderbilt's recent football history was practically a reverse image of BC's. The Commodores, long hampered by being the only private school in the Southeastern Conference, had gone without a winning season since 1982, and entered the 2008 campaign with only three winning seasons in the last 50 years. While BC was on a streak of 10 consecutive bowl appearances, this was Vanderbilt's first bowl game since a trip to the Hall of Fame Bowl in 1982, and only the fourth in their history.

Despite the Eagles' loss in the ACC title game, they clearly entered the game as the hotter team, winning their last four regular-season games, while the Commodores had won only one of their last seven games. The Commodores started out 5–0 for the first time since 1943, rising as high as #13 in the AP Poll. However, their only win for the rest of the regular season was on November 15, when they visited Kentucky and left with a 31–24 win that secured their bowl eligibility.

Neither team was noted for its offensive prowess during the regular season. BC's offense gained an average of 318.5 yards per game, ranking 94th out of 119 FBS teams. Vanderbilt's offense was statistically even weaker, ranking next-to-last in FBS at 260.9 yards per game. The main strength of both teams was defense. The Eagles entered the game ranked sixth in Division I FBS in total defense, giving up 273.4 yards per game. They also led Division I FBS in interceptions (26), turnovers (36), and shutouts (3), and boasted the ACC's defensive player of the year in linebacker Mark Herzlich, who returned two of his six interceptions for touchdowns. The Commodores were a less impressive but still respectable 29th in total defense at 318.7 yards allowed per game, and also finished second in the SEC in interceptions with 18.

== The game ==
=== First quarter ===
Vanderbilt kicked off the game, with the kickoff resulting in a touchback. Starting at their own 20-yard line, BC was only able to gain two yards on their first possession, and punted the ball away to the Commodores, who took possession on their own 41-yard line. The home team, who gave redshirt freshman Larry Smith his first career start at quarterback, proceeded to draw first blood with 11:02 left on a 42-yard field goal by Bryant Hahnfeldt.

After the Commodores forced another Eagles three-and-out on their next series, they got the ball back on their own 35. On their next play from scrimmage, Smith connected with Sean Walker on a 51-yard pass play, giving Vandy a first down at the BC 14. (That play would account for one-fourth of the Commodores' offensive yardage on the day, as they would only gain 200 total yards.) They were unable to put the ball in the end zone, but extended their lead to 6–0 on Hahnfeldt's second field goal of the day, a 26-yarder. The quarter ended with the same score.

=== Second quarter ===
The second quarter saw three key injuries, the game's first turnover, and BC's first sustained drive. Early in the quarter, BC lost center Matt Tennant with an injured elbow, and later lost primary punt returner Rich Gunnell to injury. The next play saw the first turnover of the game, as Vanderbilt's All-SEC cornerback D. J. Moore helped break up a Davis pass that Ryan Hamilton intercepted at the Vandy 15. However, Moore injured his ankle on that play; while he would return in the second half, he could not finish the game.

BC's next possession saw their only sustained drive of the half. Starting with 8:18 left, the Eagles went on a 17-play drive, including a key fourth-down conversion, that culminated in a 4-yard TD pass from Davis to Montel Harris with 1:27 left. The extra point from Steve Aponavicius gave the Eagles a 7–6 lead, and the Commodores chose to end the half by running out the clock.

=== Third quarter ===
BC kicked off, with Vandy returning the ball to their own 27. On the fifth play of the drive, former starting quarterback Chris Nickson entered the game and immediately ran the ball 30 yards to the BC 31, giving the Commodores good position to push for a score. However, the BC defense stiffened, driving Vandy back 11 yards on their next two plays. A third-down incompletion from Smith, who had returned to the game, set the stage for one of the game's key plays.

Brett Upson punted on fourth down from the BC 41. The punt bounced off the left knee of BC's Paul Anderson and went into the end zone, where Vandy's Sean Richardson recovered with 10:35 left. The officials huddled briefly and signaled a Vanderbilt touchdown, which was upheld on review. The ensuing extra point gave the Commodores a 13–7 lead. The remainder of the quarter saw no major action; after two possessions by each team in which the teams moved the ball for only 30 yards combined, the quarter ended with BC driving the ball from their own 3 to their own 41.

=== Fourth quarter ===
The BC drive stalled on the Vandy 42. The next three possessions, two by Vandy and one by BC, ended in three-and-outs; Upson punted for 51 and 58 yards respectively after each Vandy possession, with the second punt being downed at the BC 11 with 7:46 left. The Eagles offense soon came to life, with Davis connecting with Justin Jarvis for 30 yards on third down from their own 15. After an incompletion on the next play, the Eagles scored, with Davis throwing to Colin Larmond, Jr. for a 45-yard touchdown. The ensuing extra point gave BC a 14–13 lead.

Vandy returned the ensuing kickoff to their own 24. On the next play from scrimmage, Eagles defensive end Jim Ramella was called for a face mask penalty, putting the Commodores on their own 44. After an incompletion and 8-yard run from Smith, another former starting quarterback, Mackenzi Adams, went in for what would be his only play of the game. This proved to be a key play for the Commodores when Herzlich was called for roughing the passer, giving them a first down on the BC 34. Nickson was sacked on the next play from scrimmage, but Smith returned to hit George Smith on a 15-yard pass to the BC 25. After a 3-yard loss on third-and-1, the field goal unit came on, and Hahnfeldt kicked a 45-yarder to give the Commodores a 16–14 lead with 3:26 left.

BC went three-and-out on their next possession, and the Commodores got the ball with 2:24 left. Although they were unable to make a first down in that series, the possession was not unproductive, as BC chose to use all three of their timeouts, apparently to give their offense as much time as possible to drive for a potential winning score. The Eagles would get the ball back after an Upson punt at their own 20 with 2:01 left and no timeouts. After an incompletion and a 16-yard pass play, Davis was intercepted for the second time in the game, this time by Myron Lewis, with 1:36 left. Lewis had been beaten by Larmond on BC's previous touchdown play. With the Eagles out of timeouts, the Commodores ran out the clock for the win.

== Recap ==
Vanderbilt won a bowl game for the first time in exactly 53 years, with their last bowl win being a 25–13 win over Auburn in the Gator Bowl on December 31, 1955. This was also their first win ever over an FBS team with at least nine wins at the time of the game.

The Commodores won despite being held to only 200 yards total offense and converting only one of their 15 third-down attempts. BC gained 331 total yards, and had 17 first downs to Vandy's 8. The major differences in the game proved to be the tigers' three turnovers, one of which turned into the Commodores' only TD; and the 30 yards of penalties that the tigers picked up on Vandy's final scoring drive.

Befitting a largely defensive game, the MVP was Vandy punter Upson, who averaged 42.6 yards on his nine punts.

== Scoring summary ==
Quarter	Time	Drive		Team	Scoring Information	Score	
Quarter	Time	Length	Time	Team	Scoring Information	Boston College	Vanderbilt
1	11:02	7 plays, 35 yards	3:05	Vanderbilt	Bryant Hahnfeldt 42-yard field goal	0	3
1	6:31	5 plays, 57 yards	2:46	Vanderbilt	Bryant Hahnfeldt 26-yard field goal	0	6
2	1:27	17 plays, 63 yards	6:51	Boston College	Montel Harris 4-yard catch from Dominique Davis, Steve Aponavicius kick good	7	6
3	10:35	—		Vanderbilt	Sean Richardson fumble recovery in end zone, Bryant Hahnfeldt kick good	7	13
4	6:38	5 plays, 89 yards	1:08	Boston College	Colin Larmond, Jr. 55-yard catch from Dominique Davis, Steve Aponavicius kick good	14	13
4	3:26	7 plays, 48 yards	3:12	Vanderbilt	Bryant Hahnfeldt 45-yard field goal	14	16
Final score						14	16
