= List of Air Force Falcons head football coaches =

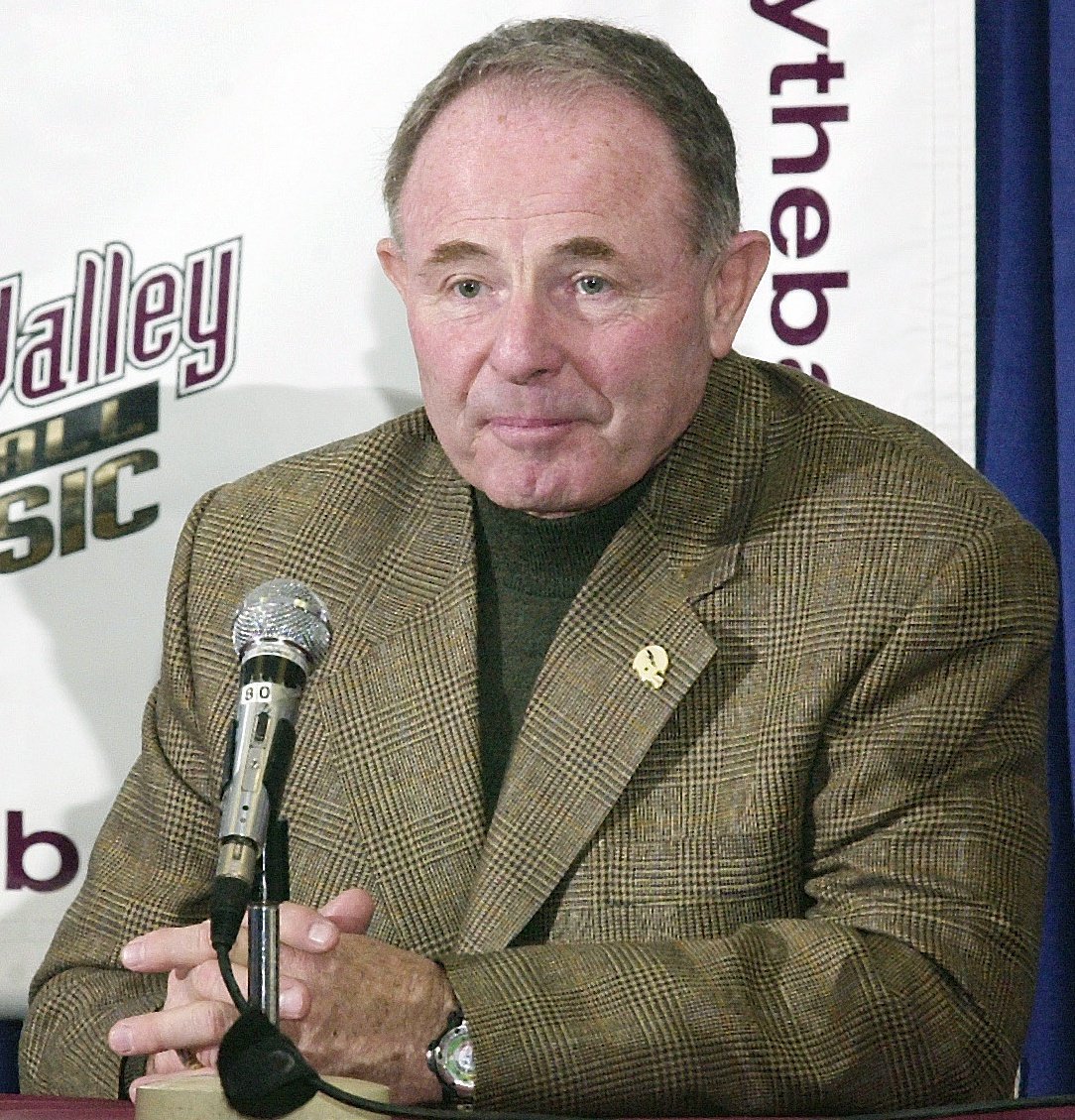
Fisher DeBerry, the longest-serving and winningest coach in Air Force history

The Air Force Falcons football team represents the United States Air Force Academy in the Mountain Division of the Mountain West Conference (MW), competing as part of the National Collegiate Athletic Association (NCAA) Division I Football Bowl Subdivision (FBS). The program began in 1955 as an independent; Air Force joined the Western Athletic Conference in 1980 and later moved to the Mountain West. During this sixty-two year period, the Falcons have had seven head coaches. Troy Calhoun has been the head coach of the program since December 2006, following Fisher DeBerry's retirement.

The falcon was adopted as the team's nickname by the academy's inaugural 1955 freshman team, who felt the bird characterizes the role the school's airmen will play following graduation. A series of live falcons, nicknamed "Mach 1", have served as the team mascot since that 1955 season. The Falcons have played in 757 games over the programs 66-season history. During that time, four of the programs coaches have led teams to a combined twenty-six bowl games. Additionally, two, DeBerry and Calhoun, have led the program to a divisional title and DeBerry guided the school to three conference championships. Both DeBerry and Buck Shaw, the former of whom spent his entire head coaching career at Air Force, have been inducted into the College Football Hall of Fame.

DeBerry holds most of Air Force's coaching records, including years coached (23), games coached (279), total wins (169), total losses (109), overall win percentage (0.608), conference wins (100), conference losses (73), conference win percentage (0.578), and postseason appearances (12). Bill Parcells has the fewest wins (3) and lowest win percentage (0.273). Robert V. Whitlow, the program's first coach, has the fewest games coached (8) and fewest losses (4). Ken Hatfield has the lowest win percentage among coaches with more than one season (0.449).

== Key ==
Key to symbols in coaches list
General		Overall		Conference		Postseason (Note: Although the first Rose Bowl Game was played in 1902, it has been continuously played since the 1916 game, and is recognized as the oldest bowl game by the NCAA. "—" indicates any season prior to 1916 when postseason games were not played.)	
No.	Order of coaches (Note: A running total of the number of head coaches, with coaches who served separate tenures being counted only once. Interim head coaches are represented with "Int" and are not counted in the running total. "—" indicates the team played but either without a coach or no coach is on record. "X" indicates an interim year without play.)	GC	Games coached	CW	Conference wins	PW	Postseason wins
DC	Division championships	OW	Overall wins	CL	Conference losses	PL	Postseason losses
CC	Conference championships	OL	Overall losses	CT	Conference ties	PT	Postseason ties
NC	National championships	OT	Overall ties (Note: Overtime rules in college football were introduced in 1996, making ties impossible in the period since.)	C%	Conference winning percentage		
†	Elected to the College Football Hall of Fame	O%	Overall winning percentage (Note: When computing the win–loss percentage, a tie counts as half a win and half a loss.)				

== Coaches ==
List of head football coaches showing season(s) coached, overall records, conference records (Note: The Falcons were members of the Western Athletic Conference from 1980 to 1998, prior to which they competed as an independent. Since 1999, Air Force has been a member of the Mountain West Conference. The Falcons have been members of conference divisions at two points; between 1996 and 1998 in the Western Athletic Conference, and since 2013 in the Mountain West Conference.), postseason records, championships and selected awards (Note: Statistics correct as of the end of the 2025 NCAA Division I FBS football season.)
No.	Name	Season(s)	GC	OW	OL	OT	O%	CW	CL	CT	C%	PW	PL	PT	DC	CC	NC	Awards
1	Robert V. Whitlow	1955	8	4	4	0	0.500	—	—	—	—	0	0	0	—	—	0	—
2	Buck Shaw^{†}	1956–1957	19	9	8	2	0.526	—	—	—	—	0	0	0	—	—	0	—
3	Ben Martin	1958–1977	208	96	103	9	0.483	—	—	—	—	0	2	1	—	—	0	—
4	Bill Parcells	1978	11	3	8	0	0.273	—	—	—	—	0	0	0	—	—	0	—
5	Ken Hatfield	1979–1983	59	26	32	1	0.449	12	11	0	0.522	2	0	0	—	0	0	AFCA Coach of the Year (1983); Bobby Dodd Coach of the Year Award (1983)
6	Fisher DeBerry^{†}	1984—2006	279	169	109	1	0.608	100	73	1	0.578	6	6	0	1	3	0	AFCA Coach of the Year (1985); Bobby Dodd Coach of the Year Award (1985); Walter Camp Coach of the Year Award (1985); WAC Coach of the Year (1985, 1995, 1998)
7	Troy Calhoun	2007–present	236	139	97	—	0.589	83	63	—	0.568	8	5	—	2	0	0	MWC Coach of the Year (2007)
