= List of Air Force Falcons football seasons =

The Air Force Falcons football team competes in the National Collegiate Athletic Association (NCAA) Division I Football Bowl Subdivision, representing the United States Air Force Academy. Since 1999, the Falcons have competed as a charter member of the Mountain West Conference.

== Seasons ==
Year	Coach	Overall	Conference	Standing	Bowl/playoffs	Coaches^{#}	AP^{°}
Robert V. Whitlow (Independent) (1955)
1955	Robert V. Whitlow	4–4					
Buck Shaw (Independent) (1956–1957)
1956	Buck Shaw	6–2–1					
1957	Buck Shaw	3–6–1					
Ben Martin (Independent) (1958–1977)
1958	Ben Martin	9–0–2			T Cotton	8	6
1959	Ben Martin	5–4–1					
1960	Ben Martin	4–6					
1961	Ben Martin	3–7					
1962	Ben Martin	5–5					
1963	Ben Martin	7–4			L Gator		
1964	Ben Martin	4–5–1					
1965	Ben Martin	3–6–1					
1966	Ben Martin	4–6					
1967	Ben Martin	2–6–2					
1968	Ben Martin	7–3					
1969	Ben Martin	6–4					
1970	Ben Martin	9–3			L Sugar	11	16
1971	Ben Martin	6–4					
1972	Ben Martin	6–4					
1973	Ben Martin	6–4					
1974	Ben Martin	2–9					
1975	Ben Martin	2–8–1					
1976	Ben Martin	4–7					
1977	Ben Martin	2–8–1					
Bill Parcells (Independent) (1978)
1978	Bill Parcells	3–8					
Ken Hatfield (Independent) (1979)
1979	Ken Hatfield	2–9					
Ken Hatfield (Western Athletic Conference) (1979–1983)
1980	Ken Hatfield	2–9–1	1–3	8th			
1981	Ken Hatfield	4–7	2–3	6th			
1982	Ken Hatfield	8–5	4–3	T–3rd	W Hall of Fame		
1983	Ken Hatfield	10–2	5–2	2nd	W Independence	15	13
Fisher DeBerry (Western Athletic Conference) (1984–1998)
1984	Fisher DeBerry	8–4	4–3	T–3rd	W Independence		
1985	Fisher DeBerry	12–1	7–1	T–1st	W Bluebonnet	5	8
1986	Fisher DeBerry	6–5	5–2	3rd			
1987	Fisher DeBerry	9–4	6–2	3rd	L Freedom		
1988	Fisher DeBerry	5–7	3–5	T–6th			
1989	Fisher DeBerry	8–4–1	5–1–1	2nd	L Liberty		
1990	Fisher DeBerry	7–5	3–4	6th	W Liberty		
1991	Fisher DeBerry	10–3	6–2	3rd	W Liberty	24	25
1992	Fisher DeBerry	7–5	4–4	T–5th	L Liberty		
1993	Fisher DeBerry	4–8	1–7	9th			
1994	Fisher DeBerry	8–4	6–2	T–2nd			
1995	Fisher DeBerry	8–5	6–2	T–1st	L Copper		
1996	Fisher DeBerry	6–5	5–3	4th (Pacific)			
1997	Fisher DeBerry	10–3	6–2	2nd (Pacific)	L Las Vegas	25	
1998	Fisher DeBerry	12–1	7–1	1st (Mountain)	W Oahu	10	13
Fisher DeBerry (Mountain West Conference) (1999–2006)
1999	Fisher DeBerry	6–5	2–5	7th			
2000	Fisher DeBerry	9–3	5–2	2nd	W Silicon Valley		
2001	Fisher DeBerry	6–6	3–4	T–5th			
2002	Fisher DeBerry	8–5	4–3	T–3rd	L San Francisco		
2003	Fisher DeBerry	7–5	3–4	T–4th			
2004	Fisher DeBerry	5–6	3–4	T–4th			
2005	Fisher DeBerry	4–7	3–5	7th			
2006	Fisher DeBerry	4–8	3–4	T–6th			
Troy Calhoun (Mountain West Conference) (2007–present)
2007	Troy Calhoun	9–4	6–2	2nd	L Armed Forces		
2008	Troy Calhoun	8–5	5–3	4th	L Armed Forces		
2009	Troy Calhoun	8–5	5–3	4th	W Armed Forces		
2010	Troy Calhoun	9–4	5–3	T–3rd	W Independence		
2011	Troy Calhoun	7–6	3–4	5th	L Military		
2012	Troy Calhoun	6–7	5–3	4th	L Armed Forces		
2013	Troy Calhoun	2–10	0–8	6th (Mountain)			
2014	Troy Calhoun	10–3	5–3	4th (Mountain)	W Famous Idaho Potato		
2015	Troy Calhoun	8–6	6–2	1st (Mountain)	L Armed Forces		
2016	Troy Calhoun	10–3	5–3	T–4th (Mountain)	W Arizona		
2017	Troy Calhoun	5–7	4–4	T–4th (Mountain)			
2018	Troy Calhoun	5–7	3–5	4th (Mountain)			
2019	Troy Calhoun	11–2	7–1	2nd (Mountain)	W Cheez-It	23	22
2020	Troy Calhoun	3–3	2–2	7th			
2021	Troy Calhoun	10–3	6–2	T–1st (Mountain)	W First Responder		
2022	Troy Calhoun	10–3	5–3	T–2nd (Mountain)	W Armed Forces		
2023	Troy Calhoun	9–4	5–3	T–4th	W Armed Forces		
2024	Troy Calhoun	5–7	3–4	T–5th			
Total:		438–349–13					
National championship Conference title Conference division title or championship game berth
^{†}Indicates Bowl Coalition, Bowl Alliance, BCS, or CFP / New Years' Six bowl.; ^{#}Rankings from final Coaches Poll.
