= 1955 Air Force Falcons football team =

American college football season

1955 Air Force Falcons football
- Conference: Independent
- Record: 4–4
- Head coach: Robert V. Whitlow (1st season)
- Captains: Brock Strom; John White

1955 Western college football independents records
	Conf.			Overall
Team	W	L	T	W		L		T
Long Beach State		–		5	–	2	–	0
Hawaii		–		7	–	4	–	0
San Jose State		–		5	–	3	–	1
Cal Poly San Dimas		–		4	–	3	–	0
La Verne		–		5	–	4	–	0
Pacific (CA)		–		5	–	4	–	0
Air Force		–		4	–	4	–	0
Pepperdine		–		5	–	5	–	0
Los Angeles State		–		3	–	6	–	0
Santa Barbara		–		3	–	6	–	0
UC Riverside		–		1	–	3	–	1

The 1955 Air Force Falcons football team represented the United States Air Force Academy as an independent during the 1955 college football season. In the first season for the football program, the Falcons were led by first-year head coach Robert V. Whitlow; they played only freshmen teams of other schools and finished at 4–4. Air Force did not have an official home venue until Falcon Stadium opened in 1962.

== Schedule ==
Date	Opponent	Site	Result	Attendance	Source
October 8	Denver freshmen	DU Stadium; Denver, CO	W 34–18	17,785	
October 15	Colorado State freshmen	Penrose Stadium; Colorado Springs, CO	W 21–13		
October 22	Colorado freshmen	Pueblo, CO	L 0–32		
October 29	Kansas freshmen	Denver, CO	L 0–33		
November 5	Utah freshmen	Penrose Stadium; Colorado Springs, CO	L 6–12	2,500	
November 12	Wyoming freshmen	Pueblo, CO	W 21–13	4,500	
November 19	at New Mexico freshmen	Zimmerman Field; Albuquerque, NM	W 7–6	7,300	
November 26	Oklahoma freshmen	Denver, CO	L 12–48		
