= 1955 Santa Barbara Gauchos football team =

American college football season

1955 Santa Barbara Gauchos football
- Conference: Independent
- Record: 3–6
- Head coach: Stan Williamson (8th season)
- Home stadium: La Playa Stadium

1955 Western college football independents records
| | Conf. | | | Overall |
| Team | W | L | T | W | | L | | T |
|---|---|---|---|---|---|---|---|---|
| Long Beach State | | – | | 5 | – | 2 | – | 0 |
| Hawaii | | – | | 7 | – | 4 | – | 0 |
| San Jose State | | – | | 5 | – | 3 | – | 1 |
| Cal Poly San Dimas | | – | | 4 | – | 3 | – | 0 |
| La Verne | | – | | 5 | – | 4 | – | 0 |
| Pacific (CA) | | – | | 5 | – | 4 | – | 0 |
| Air Force | | – | | 4 | – | 4 | – | 0 |
| Pepperdine | | – | | 5 | – | 5 | – | 0 |
| Los Angeles State | | – | | 3 | – | 6 | – | 0 |
| Santa Barbara | | – | | 3 | – | 6 | – | 0 |
| UC Riverside | | – | | 1 | – | 3 | – | 1 |

The 1955 Santa Barbara Gauchos football team represented Santa Barbara College—now known as University of California, Santa Barbara (UCSB) as an independent during the 1955 college football season. Led by eighth-year head coach Stan Williamson, Santa Barbara compiled a record of 3–6. The Gauchos played home games at La Playa Stadium in Santa Barbara, California.

== Schedule ==
| Date | Opponent | Site | Result | Attendance | Source |
|---|---|---|---|---|---|
| September 23 | Whittier | La Playa Stadium; Santa Barbara, CA | L 7–20 | | |
| October 1 | Occidental | La Playa Stadium; Santa Barbara, CA | L 0–13 | | |
| October 8 | at Cal Poly | Mustang Stadium; San Luis Obispo, CA | L 6–19 | | |
| October 15 | Los Angeles State | La Playa Stadium; Santa Barbara, CA | W 14–7 | 4,000 | |
| October 22 | at Sacramento State | Grant Stadium; Sacramento, CA | W 15–7 | 2,000 | |
| October 29 | vs. Cal Aggies (Note: The game against the Cal Aggies was part of an "All-UC Doubleheader" that was held annually from 1948 to 1963. The other game of the double-header was California vs. UCLA. The games were always held at the home stadium of either Cal or UCLA.) | Los Angeles Memorial Coliseum; Los Angeles, CA | L 0–7 | | |
| November 4 | Pepperdine | La Playa Stadium; Santa Barbara, CA | L 5–7 | | |
| November 12 | at Redlands | Redlands Stadium (Note: This stadium is the predecessor to the current Ted Runner Stadium on the University of Redlands campus, which was opened for the 1968 season); Redlands, CA | W 19–7 | | |
| November 19 | at Long Beach State | Wilson High School; Long Beach, CA | L 6–27 | | |
