= Douglas Cox (American football) =

American football player and coach (1923–2011)

Biographical details
- Born: February 9, 1923; Paint Rock, Texas, U.S.
- Died: January 27, 2011 (aged 87); Ballinger, Texas, U.S.

Playing career
- 1940: San Angelo
- 1941: SMU

Coaching career (HC unless noted)
- 1955: McMurry

Administrative career (AD unless noted)
- 1954–1955: McMurry

Head coaching record
- Overall: 8–2 (college)

Accomplishments and honors

Championships
- 1 Texas Conference (1955)

Edward Douglas Cox (February 9, 1923 – January 27, 2011) was an American football player and coach. He served as the head football coach McMurry College in 1955 in between successful runs as a high school football coach at several locations in Texas, including Colorado City, Ballinger and Brownfield.

== Head coaching record ==
=== College ===
Year	Team	Overall	Conference	Standing	Bowl/playoffs
McMurry Indians (Texas Conference) (1955)
1955	McMurry	8–2	2–0	1st	
McMurry:		8–2	2–0		
Total:		8–2			
National championship Conference title Conference division title or championship game berth
