= 1955 Washington Huskies football team =

American college football season

1955 Washington Huskies football
- Conference: Pacific Coast Conference
- Record: 5–4–1 (4–3–1 PCC)
- Head coach: John Cherberg (3rd season)
- Captain: Bob McNamee
- Home stadium: University of Washington Stadium

1955 Pacific Coast Conference football standings
	Conf.					Overall
Team	W		L		T	W		L		T
No. 4 UCLA $	6	–	0	–	0	9	–	2	–	0
Oregon State	5	–	2	–	0	6	–	3	–	0
No. 16 Stanford	3	–	2	–	1	6	–	3	–	1
Oregon	4	–	3	–	0	6	–	4	–	0
Washington	4	–	3	–	1	5	–	4	–	1
No. 13 USC	3	–	3	–	0	6	–	4	–	0
California	1	–	5	–	1	2	–	7	–	1
Washington State	1	–	5	–	1	1	–	7	–	2
Idaho	0	–	4	–	0	2	–	7	–	0
$ – Conference champion; Rankings from AP Poll

The 1955 Washington Huskies football team was an American football team that represented the University of Washington during the 1955 college football season. In its third and final season under head coach John Cherberg, the team compiled a 5–4–1 record, fifth in the Pacific Coast Conference, and was outscored 141 to 93. Bob McNamee was the team captain.

After months of unrest among players and revelations about unchecked boosters, Cherberg was dismissed in late January, Athletic director Harvey Cassill resigned two weeks later; his successor, George Briggs, hired Mississippi State head coach Darrell Royal in late February to lead the Husky football program in 1956.

The November 12 game against UCLA was referenced in the 1989 film, Back to the Future Part II; The older Biff Tannen traveled back in time to give his younger self a sports almanac, and he referenced this game to verify its accuracy.

== Schedule ==
Date	Opponent	Rank	Site	Result	Attendance	Source
September 17	Idaho		University of Washington Stadium; Seattle, WA	W 14–7	25,561	
September 24	at Minnesota*		Memorial Stadium; Minneapolis, MN	W 30–0	58,817	
October 1	at Oregon	No. 19	Multnomah Stadium; Portland, OR (rivalry)	W 19–7	29,113	
October 8	No. 10 USC	No. 18	University of Washington Stadium; Seattle, WA	W 7–0	35,500	
October 15	Baylor*	No. 12	University of Washington Stadium; Seattle, WA	L 7–13	39,536	
October 22	Stanford		University of Washington Stadium; Seattle, WA	T 7–7	47,500	
October 29	Oregon State		University of Washington Stadium; Seattle, WA	L 7–13	25,000	
November 5	at California		California Memorial Stadium; Berkeley, CA	L 6–20	24,000	
November 12	at No. 4 UCLA		Los Angeles Memorial Coliseum; Los Angeles, CA	L 17–19	47,519	
November 19	Washington State		University of Washington Stadium; Seattle, WA (rivalry)	W 27–7	30,000	
*Non-conference game; Rankings from AP Poll released prior to the game; Source:

== NFL draft selections ==
One University of Washington Husky was selected in the 1956 NFL draft, which lasted 30 rounds with 360 selections.

= Husky Hall of Fame

Player	Position	Round	Pick	NFL club
Mike Monroe	Back	23rd	267	San Francisco 49ers
