= 1955 Pacific Tigers football team =

American college football season

1955 Pacific Tigers football
- Conference: Independent
- Record: 5–4
- Head coach: Jack Myers (3rd season)
- Home stadium: Pacific Memorial Stadium

1955 Western college football independents records
	Conf.			Overall
Team	W	L	T	W		L		T
Long Beach State		–		5	–	2	–	0
Hawaii		–		7	–	4	–	0
San Jose State		–		5	–	3	–	1
Cal Poly San Dimas		–		4	–	3	–	0
La Verne		–		5	–	4	–	0
Pacific (CA)		–		5	–	4	–	0
Air Force		–		4	–	4	–	0
Pepperdine		–		5	–	5	–	0
Los Angeles State		–		3	–	6	–	0
Santa Barbara		–		3	–	6	–	0
UC Riverside		–		1	–	3	–	1

The 1955 Pacific Tigers football team represented the College of the Pacific (COP)—now known as the University of the Pacific—as an independent during the 1955 college football season. Led by third-year head coach Jack Myers, the Tigers compiled a record of 5–4 and outscored opponents 132 to 121. The team played home games at Pacific Memorial Stadium in Stockton, California.

== Schedule ==
Date	Opponent	Site	Result	Attendance	Source
September 17	at Stanford	Stanford Stadium; Stanford, CA	L 14–33	25,000	
September 24	at No. 19 Purdue	Ross–Ade Stadium; West Lafayette, IN	L 7–14	44,500	
October 1	Cincinnati	Pacific Memorial Stadium; Stockton, CA	W 27–14	14,500	
October 8	at Idaho	Neale Stadium; Moscow, ID	W 20–0	9,500	
October 15	Oregon State	Pacific Memorial Stadium; Stockton, CA	W 13–7	22,500	
October 22	at San Jose State	Spartan Stadium; San Jose, CA (Victory Bell)	W 14–7	18,313	
October 29	Washington State	Pacific Memorial Stadium; Stockton, CA	W 30–0	12,000	
November 5	No. 5 UCLA	Pacific Memorial Stadium; Stockton, CA	L 0–34	26,000	
November 19	at Texas Tech	Jones Stadium; Lubbock, TX	L 7–13	16,500	
Rankings from AP Poll released prior to the game; Source:

== Team players in the NFL ==
The following College of the Pacific players were selected in the 1956 NFL draft.

Player	Position	Round	Overall	NFL team
A.D. Williams	End – Flanker	3	32	Los Angeles Rams
Gene Cronin	Defensive end – Linebacker – Guard	7	74	Detroit Lions

The following finished their college career in 1955, were not drafted, but played in the NFL.

Player	Position	First NFL team
Clyde Conner	End	1956 San Francisco 49ers
