= 1955 Oklahoma A&M Cowboys football team =

American college football season

1955 Oklahoma A&M Cowboys football
- Conference: Missouri Valley Conference
- Record: 2–8 (1–3 MVC)
- Head coach: Cliff Speegle (1st season)
- Home stadium: Lewis Field

1955 Missouri Valley Conference football standings
	Conf.					Overall
Team	W		L		T	W		L		T
Wichita +	3	–	1	–	0	7	–	2	–	1
Detroit +	3	–	1	–	0	5	–	3	–	1
Houston	2	–	2	–	0	6	–	4	–	0
Tulsa	1	–	3	–	0	2	–	7	–	1
Oklahoma A&M	1	–	3	–	0	2	–	8	–	0
+ – Conference co-champions

The 1955 Oklahoma A&M Cowboys football team represented Oklahoma Agricultural and Mechanical College (later renamed Oklahoma State University–Stillwater) in the Missouri Valley Conference during the 1955 college football season. In their first season under head coach Cliff Speegle, the Cowboys compiled a 2–8 record (1–3 against conference opponents), tied for last place in the conference, and were outscored by opponents by a combined total of 172 to 88.

On offense, the 1955 team averaged 8.8 points scored, 144.1 rushing yards, and 81.7 passing yards per game. On defense, the team allowed an average of 17.2 points scored, 237.5 rushing yards and 64.8 passing yards per game. The team's statistical leaders included fullback Earl Lunsford with 596 rushing yards and 30 points scored, Tom Pontius with 764 passing yards, and Chester Spencer with 319 receiving yards.

End Chester Spencer received first-team All-Missouri Valley Conference honors.

The team played its home games at Lewis Field in Stillwater, Oklahoma.

== Schedule ==
Date	Opponent	Site	Result	Attendance	Source
September 24	at No. 17 Arkansas*	War Memorial Stadium; Little Rock, AR	L 0–21	30,000	
October 1	Texas Tech*	Lewis Field; Stillwater, OK	L 6–24	16,000	
October 8	Wichita	Lewis Field; Stillwater, OK	L 7–14	14,500	
October 15	at Houston	Rice Stadium; Houston, TX	L 13–21	27,000	
October 21	at Detroit	University of Detroit Stadium; Detroit, MI	L 0–7	16,280	
October 29	Tulsa	Lewis Field; Stillwater, OK (rivalry)	W 14–0	16,000	
November 5	Colorado A&M*^{†}	Lewis Field; Stillwater, OK	L 13–20	21,500	
November 12	at Kansas*	Memorial Stadium; Lawrence, KS	L 7–12	12,000	
November 19	Kansas State*	Lewis Field; Stillwater, OK	W 28–0		
November 26	at No. 1 Oklahoma*	Oklahoma Memorial Stadium; Norman, OK	L 0–53	40,182	
*Non-conference game; ^{†}Homecoming; Rankings from Coaches' Poll released prior to the game

== After the season ==
The 1956 NFL draft was held on January 17–18, 1956. The following Cowboys were selected.

Round	Pick	Player	Position	NFL team
23	270	Chet Spencer	End	Philadelphia Eagles
26	305	Earl Lunsford	Back	Philadelphia Eagles
27	317	Jack Hutchinson	Tackle	Chicago Cardinals
