= 1955 Texas Western Miners football team =

American college football season

1955 Texas Western Miners football
- Conference: Border Conference
- Record: 6–2–2 (3–2–1 Border)
- Head coach: Mike Brumbelow (6th season)
- Home stadium: Kidd Field

1955 Border Conference football standings
	Conf.					Overall
Team	W		L		T	W		L		T
Texas Tech $	3	–	0	–	1	7	–	3	–	1
Arizona State	4	–	1	–	0	8	–	2	–	1
Hardin–Simmons	3	–	2	–	0	5	–	5	–	0
Texas Western	3	–	2	–	1	6	–	2	–	2
Arizona	1	–	2	–	1	5	–	4	–	1
West Texas State	1	–	4	–	1	4	–	4	–	1
New Mexico A&M	0	–	4	–	0	3	–	7	–	0
$ – Conference champion

The 1955 Texas Western Miners football team was an American football team that represented Texas Western College (now known as University of Texas at El Paso) as a member of the Border Conference during the 1955 college football season. In its sixth season under head coach Mike Brumbelow, the team compiled a 6–2–2 record (3–2–1 against Border Conference opponents), finished fourth in the conference, and outscored all opponents by a total of 227 to 114.

== Schedule ==
Date	Opponent	Site	Result	Attendance	Source
September 24	North Texas State*	Kidd Field; El Paso, TX	T 7–7	10,000	
October 1	at New Mexico*	Zimmerman Field; Albuquerque, NM	W 34–0		
October 8	Texas Tech	Kidd Field; El Paso, TX	T 27–27	14,000	
October 15	at Arizona	Arizona Stadium; Tucson, AZ	W 29–0	21,500	
October 22	at Wichita*	Veterans Field; Wichita, KS	W 28–12	11,175	
October 29	New Mexico A&M	Kidd Field; El Paso, TX	W 41–6	8,000	
November 4	at Hardin–Simmons	Parramore Stadium; Abilene, TX	L 21–23	5,000	
November 12	Arizona State^{†}	Kidd Field; El Paso, TX	L 13–20	13,000	
November 19	West Texas State	Kidd Field; El Paso, TX	W 13–6	10,000	
November 25	at Trinity (TX)*	Alamo Stadium; San Antonio, TX	W 14–13		
*Non-conference game; ^{†}Homecoming
