= 1955 West Texas State Buffaloes football team =

American college football season

1955 West Texas State Buffaloes football
- Conference: Border Conference
- Record: 4–4–1 (1–4–1 Border)
- Head coach: Frank Kimbrough (9th season)
- Home stadium: Buffalo Stadium

1955 Border Conference football standings
| | Conf. | | | | | Overall |
| Team | W | | L | | T | W | | L | | T |
|---|---|---|---|---|---|---|---|---|---|---|
| Texas Tech $ | 3 | – | 0 | – | 1 | 7 | – | 3 | – | 1 |
| Arizona State | 4 | – | 1 | – | 0 | 8 | – | 2 | – | 1 |
| Hardin–Simmons | 3 | – | 2 | – | 0 | 5 | – | 5 | – | 0 |
| Texas Western | 3 | – | 2 | – | 1 | 6 | – | 2 | – | 2 |
| Arizona | 1 | – | 2 | – | 1 | 5 | – | 4 | – | 1 |
| West Texas State | 1 | – | 4 | – | 1 | 4 | – | 4 | – | 1 |
| New Mexico A&M | 0 | – | 4 | – | 0 | 3 | – | 7 | – | 0 |
$ – Conference champion

The 1955 West Texas State Buffaloes football team represented West Texas State College—now known as West Texas A&M University—as a member of the Border Conference during the 1955 college football season. Led by ninth-year head coach Frank Kimbrough, the Buffaloes compiled an overall record of 4–4–1 with a mark of 1–4–1 in conference play, placing sixth the Border Conference.

== Schedule ==
| Date | Time | Opponent | Site | Result | Attendance | Source |
|---|---|---|---|---|---|---|
| September 17 | | Corpus Christi* | Buffalo Stadium; Canyon, TX | W 46–0 | | |
| September 24 | 8:00 p.m. | McMurry* | Buffalo Stadium; Canyon, TX | W 6–0 | | |
| October 1 | | Midwestern (TX)* | Buffalo Stadium; Canyon, TX | W 34–0 | 3,000 | |
| October 8 | 9:00 p.m. | at Arizona | Arizona Stadium; Tucson, AZ | T 20–20 | 21,500 | |
| October 15 | | at New Mexico A&M | Memorial Stadium; Las Cruces, NM | W 32–6 | | |
| October 22 | | Hardin–Simmons^{†} | Buffalo Stadium; Canyon, TX | L 18–19 | 7,500 | |
| October 29 | | at Texas Tech | Jones Stadium; Lubbock, TX | L 24–27 | 16,000 | |
| November 5 | | at Arizona State | Goodwin Stadium; Tempe, AZ | L 7–27 | | |
| November 19 | | at Texas Western | Kidd Field; El Paso, TX | L 7–13 | 10,000 | |
*Non-conference game; ^{†}Homecoming; All times are in Central time
