= 1955 Pepperdine Waves football team =

American college football season

1955 Pepperdine Waves football
- Conference: Independent
- Record: 5–5
- Head coach: John Scolinos (1st season)
- Home stadium: El Camino Stadium

1955 Western college football independents records
	Conf.			Overall
Team	W	L	T	W		L		T
Long Beach State		–		5	–	2	–	0
Hawaii		–		7	–	4	–	0
San Jose State		–		5	–	3	–	1
Cal Poly San Dimas		–		4	–	3	–	0
La Verne		–		5	–	4	–	0
Pacific (CA)		–		5	–	4	–	0
Air Force		–		4	–	4	–	0
Pepperdine		–		5	–	5	–	0
Los Angeles State		–		3	–	6	–	0
Santa Barbara		–		3	–	6	–	0
UC Riverside		–		1	–	3	–	1

The 1955 Pepperdine Waves football team represented George Pepperdine College (Note: Pepperdine University was known as George Pepperdine College from 1937 to 1970.) as an independent during the 1955 college football season. The team was led by first-year head coach John Scolinos and played home games at El Camino Stadium on the campus of El Camino College in Torrance, California. They finished the season with a record of 5–5.

== Schedule ==
Date	Opponent	Site	Result	Attendance	Source
September 17	at Idaho State	Spud Bowl; Pocatello, ID	L 0–9	4,200	
September 24	San Diego State	El Camino Stadium; Torrance, CA	W 21–0		
October 1	Chico State	El Camino Stadium; Torrance, CA	L 13–19		
October 8	Terminal Island Navy (Note: Naval Air Station Terminal Island was one of several names for the Naval air station and repair facility located on Terminal Island in Los Angeles County, California from 1938 to 1997)	El Camino Stadium; Torrance, CA	W 27–6		
October 15	at Redlands	Redlands Stadium (Note: This stadium is the predecessor to the current Ted Runner Stadium on the University of Redlands campus, which was opened for the 1968 season); Redlands, CA	L 0–2		
October 22	at Whittier	Hadley Field; Whittier, CA	L 6–13	5,000	
November 4	at Santa Barbara	La Playa Stadium; Santa Barbara, CA	W 7–5		
November 11	Arizona State–Flagstaff^{†}	El Camino Stadium; Torrance, CA	W 34–14		
November 18	at Los Angeles State	Snyder Field; Los Angeles, CA ("Old Shoe" rivalry)	W 6–0	3,000	
November 24	at Humboldt State	Redwood Bowl; Arcata, CA	L 14–26	3,300	
^{†}Homecoming
