= 1955 Hawaii Rainbows football team =

American college football season

1955 Hawaii Rainbows football
- Conference: Independent
- Record: 7–4
- Head coach: Hank Vasconcellos (4th season)
- Home stadium: Honolulu Stadium

1955 Western college football independents records
	Conf.			Overall
Team	W	L	T	W		L		T
Long Beach State		–		5	–	2	–	0
Hawaii		–		7	–	4	–	0
San Jose State		–		5	–	3	–	1
Cal Poly San Dimas		–		4	–	3	–	0
La Verne		–		5	–	4	–	0
Pacific (CA)		–		5	–	4	–	0
Air Force		–		4	–	4	–	0
Pepperdine		–		5	–	5	–	0
Los Angeles State		–		3	–	6	–	0
Santa Barbara		–		3	–	6	–	0
UC Riverside		–		1	–	3	–	1

The 1955 Hawaii Rainbows football team represented the University of Hawaiʻi at Mānoa as an independent during the 1955 college football season. In their fourth season under head coach Hank Vasconcellos, the Rainbows compiled a 7–4 record.

== Schedule ==
Date	Opponent	Site	Result	Attendance	Source
September 2	Prep All-Stars	Honolulu Stadium; Honolulu, Territory of Hawaii	W 33–7	18,000	
September 17	at Nebraska	Memorial Stadium; Lincoln, NE	W 6–0	23,000	
September 23	at San Jose State	Spartan Stadium; San Jose, CA (rivalry)	L 0–34	15,000–16,000	
October 7	Naval Station Pearl Harbor	Honolulu Stadium; Honolulu, Territory of Hawaii	W 19–12	6,000	
October 28	Hawaii Marines	Honolulu Stadium; Honolulu, Territory of Hawaii	W 20–19	9,000	
November 5	Naval Station Pearl Harbor	Honolulu Stadium; Honolulu, Territory of Hawaii	W 25–0	7,000	
November 16	Hawaii Rams	Honolulu Stadium; Honolulu, Territory of Hawaii	W 26–12	5,000	
November 21	Hawaii Marines	Honolulu Stadium; Honolulu, Territory of Hawaii	L 0–2 (forfeit)		
November 26	Fresno State	Honolulu Stadium; Honolulu, Territory of Hawaii (rivalry)	L 18–20	9,000	
December 2	Arizona State^{†}	Honolulu Stadium; Honolulu, Territory of Hawaii	L 6–39	12,000–13,000	
December 11	Hawaii Rams	Honolulu Stadium; Honolulu, Territory of Hawaii	W 34–21	1,000	
^{†}Homecoming
