= 1955 Tulsa Golden Hurricane football team =

American college football season

1955 Tulsa Golden Hurricane football
- Conference: Missouri Valley Conference
- Record: 2–7–1 (1–3 MVC)
- Head coach: Bobby Dobbs (1st season)
- Home stadium: Skelly Stadium

1955 Missouri Valley Conference football standings
	Conf.					Overall
Team	W		L		T	W		L		T
Wichita +	3	–	1	–	0	7	–	2	–	1
Detroit +	3	–	1	–	0	5	–	3	–	1
Houston	2	–	2	–	0	6	–	4	–	0
Tulsa	1	–	3	–	0	2	–	7	–	1
Oklahoma A&M	1	–	3	–	0	2	–	8	–	0
+ – Conference co-champions

The 1955 Tulsa Golden Hurricane football team represented the University of Tulsa during the 1955 college football season. In their first year under head coach Bobby Dobbs, the Golden Hurricane compiled a 2–7–1 record, 1–3 against Missouri Valley Conference opponents, and finished in a tie for last place in the conference.

== Schedule ==
Date	Opponent	Site	Result	Attendance	Source
September 17	at Arkansas*	Razorback Stadium; Fayetteville, AR	L 6–21	18,000	
September 24	Hardin–Simmons*	Skelly Stadium; Tulsa, OK	W 41–19	13,853	
October 1	at Marquette*	Marquette Stadium; Milwaukee, WI	L 0–13	14,000	
October 15	at Wyoming*	War Memorial Stadium; Laramie, WY	L 19–23	8,890	
October 22	Cincinnati*	Skelly Stadium; Tulsa, OK	T 21–21	14,079	
October 29	at Oklahoma A&M	Lewis Field; Stillwater, OK (rivalry)	L 0–14	16,000	
November 5	Houston	Skelly Stadium; Tulsa, OK	W 17–14	12,058	
November 12	Texas Tech*^{†}	Skelly Stadium; Tulsa, OK	L 7–34	12,000–14,322	
November 19	Detroit	Skelly Stadium; Tulsa, OK	L 13–19	10,562	
November 24	at Wichita	Veterans Field; Wichita, KS	L 0–54	13,845	
*Non-conference game; ^{†}Homecoming
