= 1955 Cal Poly San Dimas Broncos football team =

American college football season

1955 Cal Poly San Dimas Broncos football
- Conference: Independent
- Record: 4–3
- Head coach: Staley Pitts (3rd season)

1955 Western college football independents records
	Conf.			Overall
Team	W	L	T	W		L		T
Long Beach State		–		5	–	2	–	0
Hawaii		–		7	–	4	–	0
San Jose State		–		5	–	3	–	1
Cal Poly San Dimas		–		4	–	3	–	0
La Verne		–		5	–	4	–	0
Pacific (CA)		–		5	–	4	–	0
Air Force		–		4	–	4	–	0
Pepperdine		–		5	–	5	–	0
Los Angeles State		–		3	–	6	–	0
Santa Barbara		–		3	–	6	–	0
UC Riverside		–		1	–	3	–	1

The 1955 Cal Poly San Dimas Broncos football team represented the Cal Poly Kellogg-Voorhis Unit—now known as California State Polytechnic University, Pomona—as an independent during the 1955 college football season. Led by Staley Pitts in his third and final season as head coach, Cal Poly San Dimas compiled a record of 4–3. The team was outscored by its opponents 120 to 102 for the season.

== Schedule ==
Date	Opponent	Site	Result	Source
October 1	at Imperial Valley	Imperial, CA	W 19–0	
October 7	Caltech	Bonita High School; La Verne, CA	L 0–19	
October 15	California Baptist	Claremont Alumni Field; Claremont, CA	W 46–18	
October 21	at Santa Barbara City	Santa Barbara, CA	W 10–7	
October 28	La Verne	Bonita High School; La Verne, CA	L 0–21	
November 5	at UC Riverside	Wheelock Field; Riverside, CA	W 21–13	
November 10	Long Beach State	Bonita High School; La Verne, CA	L 6–27	
