= 1955 Arizona Wildcats football team =

American college football season

1955 Arizona Wildcats football
- Conference: Border Conference
- Record: 5–4–1 (1–2–1 Border)
- Head coach: Warren Woodson (4th season)
- Captains: Paul Hatcher; Bill Codd
- Home stadium: Arizona Stadium

1955 Border Conference football standings
	Conf.					Overall
Team	W		L		T	W		L		T
Texas Tech $	3	–	0	–	1	7	–	3	–	1
Arizona State	4	–	1	–	0	8	–	2	–	1
Hardin–Simmons	3	–	2	–	0	5	–	5	–	0
Texas Western	3	–	2	–	1	6	–	2	–	2
Arizona	1	–	2	–	1	5	–	4	–	1
West Texas State	1	–	4	–	1	4	–	4	–	1
New Mexico A&M	0	–	4	–	0	3	–	7	–	0
$ – Conference champion

The 1955 Arizona Wildcats football team represented the University of Arizona in the Border Conference during the 1955 college football season. In their fourth season under head coach Warren B. Woodson, the Wildcats compiled a 5–4–1 record (1–2–1 against Border opponents) and were outscored by their opponents, 184 to 169. The team captains were Paul Hatcher and Bill Codd. The team played its home games in Arizona Stadium in Tucson, Arizona.

Tailback Art Luppino rushed for 1,313 yards during the 1955 season and was the NCAA rushing leader for the second consecutive season.

== Schedule ==
Date	Time	Opponent	Site	Result	Attendance	Source
September 17		Colorado State*	Arizona Stadium; Tucson, AZ	W 20–7	22,500	
September 24		at Colorado*	Folsom Field; Boulder, CO	L 0–14	28,000	
October 1	8:00 p.m.	Idaho*	Arizona Stadium; Tucson, AZ	W 47–14	20,000	
October 8	8:00 p.m.	West Texas State	Arizona Stadium; Tucson, AZ	T 20–20	21,500	
October 15		Texas Western	Arizona Stadium; Tucson, AZ	L 0–29	21,500	
October 22		Oregon*^{†}	Arizona Stadium; Tucson, AZ	L 27–46	22,000	
November 5		at Texas Tech	Jones Stadium; Lubbock, TX	L 7–27	17,000	
November 12		Montana*	Arizona Stadium; Tucson, AZ	W 29–0	13,000	
November 19		New Mexico*	Arizona Stadium; Tucson, AZ	W 27–6		
November 26		at Arizona State	Goodwin Stadium; Tempe, AZ (rivalry)	W 7–6		
*Non-conference game; ^{†}Homecoming; All times are in Mountain time
