= 1955 McMurry Indians football team =

American college football season

1955 McMurry Indians football

Texas Conference champion
- Conference: Texas Conference
- Record: 8–2 (2–0 Texas)
- Head coach: Douglas Cox (1st season)
- Home stadium: Indian Stadium, Fair Park Stadium

1955 Texas Conference football standings
	Conf.					Overall
Team	W		L		T	W		L		T
McMurry $	2	–	0	–	0	8	–	2	–	0
Howard Payne	1	–	1	–	0	6	–	2	–	2
Eastern New Mexico	0	–	2	–	0	5	–	4	–	0
$ – Conference champion

The 1955 McMurry Indians football team represented McMurry College—now known as McMurry University—as a member of the Texas Conference during the 1955 college football season. Led by Douglas Cox in his first and only season as head coach, the Indians compiled an overall record of 8–2 with a mark of 2–0 in conference play, winning the Texas Conference title.

== Schedule ==
Date	Time	Opponent	Site	Result	Attendance	Source
September 17		at Gustavus Adolphus*	Central Stadium; Saint Paul, MN	W 13–0		
September 24	8:00 p.m.	at West Texas State*	Buffalo Stadium; Canyon, TX	L 0–6		
October 1	8:00 p.m.	at Sul Ross*	Jackson Field; Alpine, TX (rivalry)	W 18–12		
October 8		at Midwestern (TX)*	Midwestern Stadium; Wichita Falls, TX	W 21–20	6,000	
October 15	8:00 p.m.	at Abilene Christian*	Fair Park Stadium; Abilene, TX	W 13–6	8,000	
October 22		at Cal Poly*	Mustang Stadium; San Luis Obispo, CA	W 23–13	6,000	
October 29		Eastern New Mexico	Indian Stadium; Abilene, TX	W 25–0	3,000	
November 5	7:30 p.m.	Howard Payne^{†}	Fair Park Stadium; Abilene, TX	W 18–7	4,500	
November 12	8:00 p.m.	at North Texas State*	Fouts Field; Denton, TX	L 21–38		
November 19	8:00 p.m.	Missouri Valley*	Indian Stadium; Abilene, TX	W 14–6		
*Non-conference game; ^{†}Homecoming; All times are in Central time
