= 1955 Occidental Tigers football team =

American college football season

1955 Occidental Tigers football
- Conference: Southern California Intercollegiate Athletic Conference
- Record: 6–2 (2–2 SCIAC)
- Head coach: Roy Dennis (11th season)
- Home stadium: Patterson Field

1955 Southern California Intercollegiate Athletic Conference football standings
	Conf.					Overall
Team	W		L		T	W		L		T
Pomona-Claremont $	4	–	0	–	0	7	–	1	–	0
Whittier	3	–	1	–	0	8	–	2	–	0
Occidental	2	–	2	–	0	6	–	2	–	0
Redlands	1	–	3	–	0	4	–	5	–	0
Caltech	0	–	4	–	0	1	–	6	–	0
$ – Conference champion

The 1955 Occidental Tigers football team represented Occidental College in the Southern California Intercollegiate Athletic Conference (SCIAC) during the 1955 college football season. In their 11th season under head coach Roy Dennis, the Tigers compiled a 6–2 record (2–2 against SCIAC opponents) and outscored opponents by a total of 141 to 69. The team played its home games at Patterson Field in Los Angeles.

Two Occidental players were selected as first-team players on the 1955 All-SCIAC team: junior end Jim Mora and senior fullback Don Lyon. Three others were named to the second team: junior quarterback Jack Kemp, junior tackle Ron Botchan, and senior guard Manuel Murietta. Lyon led the SCIAC in rushing with 478 yards; Mora led the league in receiving with 19 catches for 319 yards; Kemp led the league with 70.1 passing yards per game.

Three members of Occidental's 1955 team went on to play professional football: Jack Kemp; Jim Mora; and Ron Botchan.

== Schedule ==
Date	Opponent	Site	Result	Attendance	Source
September 23	Long Beach State*	Patterson Field; Los Angeles, CA	W 21–6		
October 1	at Santa Barbara*	La Playa Stadium; Santa Barbara, CA	W 13–0		
October 7	Los Angeles State*	Patterson Field; Los Angeles, CA	W 16–7		
October 14	Whittier	Patterson Field; Los Angeles, CA (rivalry)	L 0–7		
October 28	Redlands^{†}	Patterson Field; Los Angeles, CA	W 13–7	4,000	
November 4	at Cal Aggies*	Aggie Field; Davis, CA	W 30–6		
November 12	at Caltech	Rose Bowl; Pasadena, CA	W 35–7	2,500	
November 19	at Pomona-Claremont	Claremont, CA	L 13–29	6,000	
*Non-conference game; ^{†}Homecoming
