= 1955 Arizona State Sun Devils football team =

American college football season

1955 Arizona State Sun Devils football
- Conference: Border Conference
- Record: 8–2–1 (4–1 Border)
- Head coach: Dan Devine (1st season)
- Home stadium: Goodwin Stadium

1955 Border Conference football standings
	Conf.					Overall
Team	W		L		T	W		L		T
Texas Tech $	3	–	0	–	1	7	–	3	–	1
Arizona State	4	–	1	–	0	8	–	2	–	1
Hardin–Simmons	3	–	2	–	0	5	–	5	–	0
Texas Western	3	–	2	–	1	6	–	2	–	2
Arizona	1	–	2	–	1	5	–	4	–	1
West Texas State	1	–	4	–	1	4	–	4	–	1
New Mexico A&M	0	–	4	–	0	3	–	7	–	0
$ – Conference champion

The 1955 Arizona State Sun Devils football team season was an American football team that represented Arizona State College in the Border Conference during the 1955 college football season. In their first season under head coach Dan Devine, the Sun Devils compiled an 8–2–1 record (4–1 against Border opponents) and outscored their opponents 343 to 107.

Hired in early February, Devine was previously the backfield coach at Michigan State.

== Schedule ==
Date	Opponent	Site	Result	Attendance	Source
September 17	at Wichita*	Veterans Field; Wichita, KS	T 20–20	13,806	
September 24	Midwestern (TX)*	Goodwin Stadium; Tempe, AZ	W 28–7	10,000	
October 1	San Diego NAS*	Goodwin Stadium; Tempe, AZ	W 42–0		
October 8	at San Jose State*	Spartan Stadium; San Jose, CA	L 20–27	14,000	
October 15	at San Diego State*	Balboa Stadium; San Diego, CA	W 46–0	14,000	
October 29	Hardin–Simmons	Goodwin Stadium; Tempe, AZ	W 69–14		
November 5	West Texas State	Goodwin Stadium; Tempe, AZ	W 27–7		
November 12	at Texas Western	Kidd Field; El Paso, TX	W 20–13	13,000	
November 19	New Mexico A&M	Goodwin Stadium; Tempe, AZ	W 26–6	12,000	
November 26	Arizona	Goodwin Stadium; Tempe, AZ (rivalry)	L 6–7		
December 2	at Hawaii*	Honolulu Stadium; Honolulu, Territory of Hawaii	W 39–6	12,000–13,000	
*Non-conference game

== Roster ==
- HB Bobby Mulgado
