= 1955 Oregon State Beavers football team =

American college football season

1955 Oregon State Beavers football
- Head coach Tommy Prothro
- Conference: Pacific Coast Conference
- Record: 6–3 (5–2 PCC)
- Head coach: Tommy Prothro (1st season)
- Offensive scheme: Single-wing
- Home stadium: Parker Stadium; Multnomah Stadium

1955 Pacific Coast Conference football standings
	Conf.					Overall
Team	W		L		T	W		L		T
No. 4 UCLA $	6	–	0	–	0	9	–	2	–	0
Oregon State	5	–	2	–	0	6	–	3	–	0
No. 16 Stanford	3	–	2	–	1	6	–	3	–	1
Oregon	4	–	3	–	0	6	–	4	–	0
Washington	4	–	3	–	1	5	–	4	–	1
No. 13 USC	3	–	3	–	0	6	–	4	–	0
California	1	–	5	–	1	2	–	7	–	1
Washington State	1	–	5	–	1	1	–	7	–	2
Idaho	0	–	4	–	0	2	–	7	–	0
$ – Conference champion; Rankings from AP Poll

The 1955 Oregon State Beavers football team represented Oregon State University as a member of the Pacific Coast Conference (PCC) during the 1955 college football season. In their first season under head coach Tommy Prothro, the Beavers compiled an overall record of 6–3 record with a mark of 5–2 in conference play, placing second in the OCC, and outscored their opponents 126 to 120. They played three home games on campus at Parker Stadium in Corvallis and one at Multnomah Stadium in Portland.

Hired in February at age 34, Prothro had been an assistant coach under Red Sanders for nine seasons, at Vanderbilt from 1946 to 1948 and UCLA from 1949 to 1954. He led OSU for ten seasons, compiling an overall record of 63–37–2 (.627), and was 25–9–1 (.729) against PCC opponents.

== Schedule ==
Date	Opponent	Rank	Site	Result	Attendance	Source
September 17	BYU*		Parker Stadium; Corvallis, OR	W 33–0	8,000	
September 24	Stanford		Multnomah Stadium; Portland, OR	W 10–0	24,748	
October 7	at No. 7 UCLA		Los Angeles Memorial Coliseum; Los Angeles, CA	L 0–38	57,664	
October 15	at Pacific (CA)*		Pacific Memorial Stadium; Stockton, CA	L 7–13	22,500	
October 22	Washington State		Parker Stadium; Corvallis, OR	W 14–6	17,000	
October 29	at No. 19 Washington		Husky Stadium; Seattle, WA	W 13–7	25,000	
November 5	Idaho		Parker Stadium; Corvallis, OR	W 33–14	9,000	
November 12	at California		California Memorial Stadium; Berkeley, CA	W 16–14	35,000	
November 19	at Oregon	No. 19	Hayward Field; Eugene, OR (Civil War)	L 0–28	22,000	
*Non-conference game; Rankings from AP Poll released prior to the game; Source:
