= 1955 Utah State Aggies football team =

American college football season

1955 Utah State Aggies football
- Conference: Skyline Conference
- Record: 4–6 (3–4 Skyline)
- Head coach: Ev Faunce (1st season)
- Home stadium: Romney Stadium

1955 Skyline Conference football standings
	Conf.					Overall
Team	W		L		T	W		L		T
Colorado A&M $	6	–	1	–	0	8	–	2	–	0
Utah	4	–	1	–	0	6	–	3	–	0
Denver	5	–	2	–	0	8	–	2	–	0
Wyoming	5	–	2	–	0	8	–	3	–	0
Utah State	3	–	4	–	0	4	–	6	–	0
Montana	2	–	4	–	0	3	–	7	–	0
New Mexico	1	–	5	–	0	2	–	8	–	0
BYU	0	–	7	–	0	1	–	9	–	0
$ – Conference champion

The 1955 Utah State Aggies football team was an American football team that represented Utah State University in the Skyline Conference during the 1955 college football season. In their first season under head coach Ev Faunce, the Aggies compiled a 4–6 record (3–4 against Skyline opponents), placed fifth in the Skyline Conference, and outscored opponents by a total of 177 to 173.

== Schedule ==
Date	Opponent	Site	Result	Attendance	Source
September 16	San Jose State*	Romney Stadium; Logan, UT	L 0–13	7,000	
September 24	at Wichita*	Veterans Field; Wichita, KS	L 0–19	12,116	
October 1	at Wyoming	War Memorial Stadium; Laramie, WY (rivalry)	L 13–21	10,589	
October 8	New Mexico	Romney Stadium; Logan, UT	W 18–0		
October 15	Montana^{†}	Romney Stadium; Logan, UT	W 32–6	9,000	
October 22	at Colorado A&M	Colorado Field; Fort Collins, CO	L 9–26	6,065	
October 29	Fresno State*	Romney Stadium; Logan, UT	W 39–14	4,000	
November 5	at BYU	Cougar Stadium; Provo, UT (rivalry)	W 47–21	11,989	
November 12	at Denver	DU Stadium; Denver, CO	L 6–39	9,000–9,020	
November 24	at Utah	Ute Stadium; Salt Lake City, UT (rivalry)	L 13–14	15,742	
*Non-conference game; ^{†}Homecoming
