= 1955 Wichita Shockers football team =

American college football season

1955 Wichita Shockers football

MVC co-champion
- Conference: Missouri Valley Conference
- Record: 7–2–1 (3–1 MVC)
- Head coach: Pete Tillman (1st season)
- Home stadium: Veterans Field

1955 Missouri Valley Conference football standings
	Conf.					Overall
Team	W		L		T	W		L		T
Wichita +	3	–	1	–	0	7	–	2	–	1
Detroit +	3	–	1	–	0	5	–	3	–	1
Houston	2	–	2	–	0	6	–	4	–	0
Tulsa	1	–	3	–	0	2	–	7	–	1
Oklahoma A&M	1	–	3	–	0	2	–	8	–	0
+ – Conference co-champions

The 1955 Wichita Shockers football team was an American football team that represented the University of Wichita (now known as Wichita State University) as a member of the Missouri Valley Conference during the 1955 college football season. In its first season under head coach Pete Tillman, the team compiled a 9–1 record (4–0 against MVC opponents), tied for the MVC championship, and outscored opponents by a total of 252 to 132. The team played its home games at Veterans Field, now known as Cessna Stadium.

== Schedule ==
Date	Opponent	Site	Result	Attendance	Source
September 17	Arizona State*	Veterans Field; Wichita, KS	T 20–20	13,806	
September 24	Utah State*	Veterans Field; Wichita, KS	W 19–0	12,116	
September 30	at Detroit	University of Detroit Stadium; Detroit, MI	L 0–41	12,800–12,837	
October 8	at Oklahoma A&M	Lewis Field; Stillwater, OK	W 14–7	14,500	
October 15	at South Dakota State*	Brookings, SD	W 33–7	4,500	
October 22	Texas Western*	Veterans Field; Wichita, KS	L 12–28	11,175	
October 29	at Houston	Rice Stadium; Houston, TX	W 21–7	18,000	
November 5	Cincinnati*^{†}	Veterans Field; Wichita, KS	W 20–16	12,805	
November 12	Drake*	Veterans Field; Wichita, KS	W 59–6	13,971	
November 24	Tulsa	Veterans Field; Wichita, KS	W 54–0	13,845	
*Non-conference game; ^{†}Homecoming
