= 1955 UC Riverside Highlanders football team =

American college football season

1955 UC Riverside Highlanders football
- Conference: Independent
- Record: 1–3–1
- Head coach: Rod Franz (1st season)
- Home stadium: Wheelock Field

1955 Western college football independents records
	Conf.			Overall
Team	W	L	T	W		L		T
Long Beach State		–		5	–	2	–	0
Hawaii		–		7	–	4	–	0
San Jose State		–		5	–	3	–	1
Cal Poly San Dimas		–		4	–	3	–	0
La Verne		–		5	–	4	–	0
Pacific (CA)		–		5	–	4	–	0
Air Force		–		4	–	4	–	0
Pepperdine		–		5	–	5	–	0
Los Angeles State		–		3	–	6	–	0
Santa Barbara		–		3	–	6	–	0
UC Riverside		–		1	–	3	–	1

The 1955 UC Riverside Highlanders football team represented the University of California, Riverside as an independent during the 1955 college football season. This was the school's first season of intercollegiate football. Led by Rod Franz in his first and season as head coach, UC Riverside compiled a record of 1–3–1. The team was outscored by its opponents 127 to 68 for the season. The Highlanders played home games at Wheelock Field in Riverside, California.

== Schedule ==
Date	Opponent	Site	Result	Source
October 8	La Verne	Wheelock Field; Riverside, CA	L 0–40	
October 15	Redlands freshmen	?	L 0–40	
October 22	California Baptist	Riverside, CA	W 36–7	
October 29	at Pomona-Claremont freshmen	Claremont Alumni Field; Claremont, CA	T 19–19	
November 5	Cal Poly San Dimas	Wheelock Field; Riverside, CA	L 13–21	
