= 1955 Oregon Ducks football team =

American college football season

1955 Oregon Ducks football
- Conference: Pacific Coast Conference
- Record: 6–4 (4–3 PCC)
- Head coach: Len Casanova (5th season)
- Captain: Lon Stiner
- Home stadium: Hayward Field, Multnomah Stadium

1955 Pacific Coast Conference football standings
| | Conf. | | | | | Overall |
| Team | W | | L | | T | W | | L | | T |
|---|---|---|---|---|---|---|---|---|---|---|
| No. 4 UCLA $ | 6 | – | 0 | – | 0 | 9 | – | 2 | – | 0 |
| Oregon State | 5 | – | 2 | – | 0 | 6 | – | 3 | – | 0 |
| No. 16 Stanford | 3 | – | 2 | – | 1 | 6 | – | 3 | – | 1 |
| Oregon | 4 | – | 3 | – | 0 | 6 | – | 4 | – | 0 |
| Washington | 4 | – | 3 | – | 1 | 5 | – | 4 | – | 1 |
| No. 13 USC | 3 | – | 3 | – | 0 | 6 | – | 4 | – | 0 |
| California | 1 | – | 5 | – | 1 | 2 | – | 7 | – | 1 |
| Washington State | 1 | – | 5 | – | 1 | 1 | – | 7 | – | 2 |
| Idaho | 0 | – | 4 | – | 0 | 2 | – | 7 | – | 0 |
$ – Conference champion; Rankings from AP Poll

The 1955 Oregon Ducks football team represented the University of Oregon as a member of the Pacific Coast Conference (PCC) during the 1955 college football season. In their fifth season under head coach Len Casanova, the Ducks compiled a 6–4 record (4–3 against PCC opponents), finished in fourth place in the PCC, and outscored their opponents, 204 to 158. The team played home games at Hayward Field in Eugene, Oregon and Multnomah Stadium in Portland, Oregon.

== Schedule ==
| Date | Opponent | Site | Result | Attendance | Source |
|---|---|---|---|---|---|
| September 17 | at Utah* | Ute Stadium; Salt Lake City, UT | W 14–13 | 21,578 | |
| September 23 | at No. 9 USC | Los Angeles Memorial Coliseum; Los Angeles, CA | L 15–42 | 37,470 | |
| October 1 | No. 19 Washington | Multnomah Stadium; Portland, OR (rivalry) | L 7–19 | 29,113 | |
| October 8 | Colorado* | Hayward Field; Eugene, OR | L 6–13 | 12,500 | |
| October 15 | California | Multnomah Stadium; Portland, OR | W 21–0 | 21,515 | |
| October 22 | at Arizona* | Arizona Stadium; Tucson, AZ | W 46–27 | 22,000 | |
| October 29 | Idaho | Hayward Field; Eugene, OR | W 25–0 | 9,500 | |
| November 5 | at Washington State | Rogers Field; Pullman, WA | W 35–0 | 9,000 | |
| November 12 | at Stanford | Stanford Stadium; Stanford, CA | L 7–44 | 27,000 | |
| November 19 | No. 19 Oregon State | Hayward Field; Eugene, OR (Civil War) | W 28–0 | 22,000 | |
*Non-conference game; Rankings from AP Poll released prior to the game; Source:
