= 1955 USC Trojans football team =

American college football season

1955 USC Trojans football
- Conference: Pacific Coast Conference

Ranking
- Coaches: No. 12
- AP: No. 13
- Record: 6–4 (3–3 PCC)
- Head coach: Jess Hill (5th season)
- Captains: Marv Goux; George Galli
- Home stadium: Los Angeles Memorial Coliseum

1955 Pacific Coast Conference football standings
	Conf.					Overall
Team	W		L		T	W		L		T
No. 4 UCLA $	6	–	0	–	0	9	–	2	–	0
Oregon State	5	–	2	–	0	6	–	3	–	0
No. 16 Stanford	3	–	2	–	1	6	–	3	–	1
Oregon	4	–	3	–	0	6	–	4	–	0
Washington	4	–	3	–	1	5	–	4	–	1
No. 13 USC	3	–	3	–	0	6	–	4	–	0
California	1	–	5	–	1	2	–	7	–	1
Washington State	1	–	5	–	1	1	–	7	–	2
Idaho	0	–	4	–	0	2	–	7	–	0
$ – Conference champion; Rankings from AP Poll

The 1955 USC Trojans football team represented the University of Southern California (USC) in the 1955 college football season. In their fifth year under head coach Jess Hill, the Trojans compiled a 6–4 record (3–3 against conference opponents), finished in sixth place in the Pacific Coast Conference, and outscored their opponents by a combined total of 265 to 158. Attendance at seven home games was 464,104, an average of 66,300. Attendance at all 10 games was 615,196.

Jim Contratto led the team in passing with 22 of 55 passes completed for 406 yards, five touchdowns and five interceptions. Jon Arnett led the team in rushing with 141 carries for 672 yards and 11 touchdowns. Arnett was also the team's leading punt returners with 16 returns and an average of 17.6 yards per return, including one returned for a touchdown. With three touchdown catches, Arnett also led the team with 15 touchdowns and 105 points scored. Leon Clarke was the leading receiver with 15 catches for 215 yards and two touchdowns.

Two Trojans received first-team honors from the Associated Press on the 1955 All-Pacific Coast Conference football team: back Jon Arnett and guard Orlando Ferrante. Arnett was also a two-time recipient of the W. J. Voit Memorial Trophy as the outstanding football player on the Pacific Coast, winning the award in both 1954 and 1955. He was inducted into the USC Athletic Hall of Fame in 1994 and the College Football Hall of Fame in 2001.

== Schedule ==
Date	Opponent	Rank	Site	Result	Attendance	Source
September 17	Washington State	No. 13	Los Angeles Memorial Coliseum; Los Angeles, CA	W 50–12	35,051	
September 23	Oregon	No. 9	Los Angeles Memorial Coliseum; Los Angeles, CA	W 42–15	37,470	
September 30	Texas*	No. 9	Los Angeles Memorial Coliseum; Los Angeles, CA	W 19–7	61,996	
October 8	at No. 18 Washington	No. 10	Husky Stadium; Seattle, WA	L 0–7	35,500	
October 14	No. 6 Wisconsin*	No. 16	Los Angeles Memorial Coliseum; Los Angeles, CA	W 33–21	75,162	
October 22	at California	No. 10	California Memorial Stadium; Berkeley, CA	W 33–6	51,000	
October 29	at Minnesota*	No. 10	Memorial Stadium; Minneapolis, MN	L 19–25	64,592	
November 5	Stanford^{†}	No. 16	Los Angeles Memorial Coliseum; Los Angeles, CA (rivalry)	L 20–28	63,222	
November 19	No. 5 UCLA		Los Angeles Memorial Coliseum; Los Angeles, CA (Victory Bell)	L 7–17	95,878	
November 26	No. 5 Notre Dame*		Los Angeles Memorial Coliseum; Los Angeles, CA (rivalry)	W 42–20	94,892	
*Non-conference game; ^{†}Homecoming; Rankings from AP Poll released prior to the game; Source:

== Players ==
The following players were members of the 1955 USC football team.

- Fabian Abram, tackle
- Jon Arnett, junior tailback #26 ("led the team in total offense, punt returns, kickoff returns, punting, rushing, scoring and in total playing time")
- George Belotti, tackle
- Bing Bordier, end
- Ron Brown, back
- Leon Clarke, end (the first PCC player to be selected in the 1956 NFL draft, selected 14th overall by the Los Angeles Rams)
- Jim Contratto, quarterback
- Gordon Duvall, back (offense) and linebacker (defense)
- Dick Eldredge, center
- Dick Enright, tackle
- Orlando Ferrante, guard (All-PCC, 62 unassisted tackles, 41 assists)
- Ron Fletcher, tackle
- George Galli, guard (co-captain)
- Marv Goux (co-captain)
- Frank Hall, quarterback
- Don Hickman
- Bob Isaacson
- Ludwig Keehn, end
- Ells Kissinger, quarterback
- Doug Kranz, halfback
- Chuck Leimbach, end
- Don McFarland
- Ernie Merk (set a USC record with a 93-yard punt return against Minnesota)
- John Miller, guard
- Chuck Perpich
- Fred Pierce, left halfback
- C. R. Roberts, fullback
- Karl Rubke, center
- Vern Sampson, lineman
- Roy Smith, tackle
- Joe Tisdale
- Laird Willott, guard
- Dick Westphal
- Ernie Zampese, tailback

== Coaching staff and other personnel ==
- Head coach: Jess Hill
- Assistant coaches: Nick Pappas (defensive backs), Don Clark (line coach), George Ceithaml (offensive backfield coach), Mel Hein (line coach), Bill Fisk (end coach), Jess Mortensen (freshman coach)
- Senior manager: Jim Maddux
- Yell kings: Bill Hillinck, Kent Blanche, Al Green, Woody Wilmore, Larry Knudsen
