= 1955 Long Beach State 49ers football team =

American college football season

1955 Long Beach State 49ers football
- Conference: Independent
- Record: 5–2
- Head coach: Mike DeLotto (1st season)
- Home stadium: Veterans Memorial Stadium

1955 Western college football independents records
	Conf.			Overall
Team	W	L	T	W		L		T
Long Beach State		–		5	–	2	–	0
Hawaii		–		7	–	4	–	0
San Jose State		–		5	–	3	–	1
Cal Poly San Dimas		–		4	–	3	–	0
La Verne		–		5	–	4	–	0
Pacific (CA)		–		5	–	4	–	0
Air Force		–		4	–	4	–	0
Pepperdine		–		5	–	5	–	0
Los Angeles State		–		3	–	6	–	0
Santa Barbara		–		3	–	6	–	0
UC Riverside		–		1	–	3	–	1

The 1955 Long Beach State 49ers football team represented Long Beach State College—now known as California State University, Long Beach—as an independent during the 1955 college football season. This was the first year of competition for the program. Led by first-year head coach Mike DeLotto, the 49ers compiled a record of 5–2. The team played home games at Veterans Memorial Stadium adjacent to the campus of Long Beach City College in Long Beach, California.

== Schedule ==
Date	Opponent	Site	Result	Source
September 23	at Occidental	Patterson Field; Los Angeles, CA	L 6–21	
October 1	La Verne	Wilson High School; Long Beach, CA	W 28–12	
October 7	California Baptist	Veterans Memorial Stadium; Long Beach, CA	W 65–0	
October 22	Caltech	Veterans Memorial Stadium; Long Beach, CA	W 32–6	
October 29	at Pomona-Claremont	Claremont Alumni Field; Claremont, CA	L 14–21	
November 10	at Cal Poly San Dimas	Bonita High School; La Verne, CA	W 32–6	
November 19	Santa Barbara	Wilson High School; Long Beach, CA	W 27–6	
