= 1955 Texas Tech Red Raiders football team =

American college football season

1955 Texas Tech Red Raiders football

Border champion

Sun Bowl, L 14–21 vs. Wyoming
- Conference: Border Conference
- Record: 7–3–1 (3–0–1 Border)
- Head coach: DeWitt Weaver (5th season)
- Offensive scheme: T formation
- Base defense: 5–3
- Home stadium: Jones Stadium

1955 Border Conference football standings
	Conf.					Overall
Team	W		L		T	W		L		T
Texas Tech $	3	–	0	–	1	7	–	3	–	1
Arizona State	4	–	1	–	0	8	–	2	–	1
Hardin–Simmons	3	–	2	–	0	5	–	5	–	0
Texas Western	3	–	2	–	1	6	–	2	–	2
Arizona	1	–	2	–	1	5	–	4	–	1
West Texas State	1	–	4	–	1	4	–	4	–	1
New Mexico A&M	0	–	4	–	0	3	–	7	–	0
$ – Conference champion

The 1955 Texas Tech Red Raiders football team represented Texas Technological College—now known as Texas Tech University—as a member of the Border Conference during the 1955 college football season. Led by fifth-year head coach DeWitt Weaver, the Red Raiders compiled an overall record of 7–3–1 with a mark of 3–0–1 in conference play, winning the Border Conference title for the third consecutive season. Texas Tech was invited to the Sun Bowl, where they lost to Wyoming. This was Texas Tech's final season in the Border Conference. The team competed as an independent from 1956 to 1959 before joining the Southwest Conference (SWC) in 1960.

== Schedule ==
Date	Opponent	Rank	Site	Result	Attendance	Source
September 17	at Texas*		Memorial Stadium; Austin, TX (rivalry)	W 20–14	47,000	
September 24	TCU*	No. 12	Jones Stadium; Lubbock, TX (rivalry)	L 0–32	28,000	
October 1	at Oklahoma A&M*		Lewis Field; Stillwater, OK	W 24–6	16,000	
October 8	at Texas Western		Kidd Field; El Paso, TX	T 27–27	14,000	
October 22	at Houston*		Rice Stadium; Houston, TX (rivalry)	L 0–7	28,000	
October 29	West Texas State		Jones Stadium; Lubbock, TX	W 27–24	16,000	
November 5	Arizona^{†}		Jones Stadium; Lubbock, TX	W 27–7	17,000	
November 12	at Tulsa*		Skelly Stadium; Tulsa, OK	W 34–7	12,000–14,322	
November 19	Pacific (CA)*		Jones Stadium; Lubbock, TX	W 13–7	16,500	
November 26	Hardin–Simmons		Jones Stadium; Lubbock, TX	W 16–14	13,000	
January 2	vs. Wyoming*		Kidd Field; El Paso, TX (Sun Bowl)	L 14–21	14,500	
*Non-conference game; ^{†}Homecoming; Rankings from AP Poll released prior to the game
