= 1955 San Jose State Spartans football team =

American college football season

1955 San Jose State Spartans football
- Conference: Independent
- Record: 5–3–1
- Head coach: Bob Bronzan (6th season)
- Home stadium: Spartan Stadium

1955 Western college football independents records
	Conf.			Overall
Team	W	L	T	W		L		T
Long Beach State		–		5	–	2	–	0
Hawaii		–		7	–	4	–	0
San Jose State		–		5	–	3	–	1
Cal Poly San Dimas		–		4	–	3	–	0
La Verne		–		5	–	4	–	0
Pacific (CA)		–		5	–	4	–	0
Air Force		–		4	–	4	–	0
Pepperdine		–		5	–	5	–	0
Los Angeles State		–		3	–	6	–	0
Santa Barbara		–		3	–	6	–	0
UC Riverside		–		1	–	3	–	1

The 1955 San Jose State Spartans football team represented San Jose State College—now known as San Jose State University—as an independent during the 1955 college football season. Led by sixth-year head coach Bob Bronzan, the Spartans compiled a record of 5–3–1 and outscored opponents 159 to 114. The team played home games at Spartan Stadium in San Jose, California.

== Schedule ==
Date	Opponent	Site	Result	Attendance	Source
September 16	at Utah State	Romney Stadium (Note: This stadium is the predecessor to the current Maverik Stadium (Romney Stadium) that has served as the home of the Aggies since 1968); Logan, UT	W 13–0	7,000	
September 23	Hawaii	Spartan Stadium; San Jose, CA (rivalry)	W 34–0	16,000	
October 8	Arizona State	Spartan Stadium; San Jose, CA	W 27–20	14,000	
October 15	at New Mexico	Zimmerman Field; Albuquerque, NM	W 14–0	8,000	
October 22	Pacific (CA)	Spartan Stadium; San Jose, CA (Victory Bell)	L 7–14	18,313	
October 29	at Stanford	Stanford Stadium; Stanford, CA (rivalry)	L 18–34	33,000	
November 5	Cal Poly	Spartan Stadium; San Jose, CA	W 20–14	8,500	
November 12	at Washington State	Rogers Field; Pullman, WA	T 13–13	1,600	
November 18	at Fresno State	Ratcliffe Stadium; Fresno, CA (rivalry)	L 13–19	11,145–14,000	

== Team players in the NFL ==
The following San Jose State players were selected in the 1956 NFL draft.

Player	Position	Round	Overall	NFL team
Jack Adams	Tackle	21	246	Philadelphia Eagles
Clarence Wessman	End	22	256	San Francisco 49ers
Jim Hughes	Guard	24	289	Cleveland Browns
Joe Ulm	Back	30	352	Philadelphia Eagles
