= 1955 Montana Grizzlies football team =

American college football season

1955 Montana Grizzlies football
- Conference: Skyline Conference
- Record: 3–7 (2–4 Skyline)
- Head coach: Jerry Williams (1st season)
- Home stadium: Dornblaser Field

1955 Skyline Conference football standings
	Conf.					Overall
Team	W		L		T	W		L		T
Colorado A&M $	6	–	1	–	0	8	–	2	–	0
Utah	4	–	1	–	0	6	–	3	–	0
Denver	5	–	2	–	0	8	–	2	–	0
Wyoming	5	–	2	–	0	8	–	3	–	0
Utah State	3	–	4	–	0	4	–	6	–	0
Montana	2	–	4	–	0	3	–	7	–	0
New Mexico	1	–	5	–	0	2	–	8	–	0
BYU	0	–	7	–	0	1	–	9	–	0
$ – Conference champion

The 1955 Montana Grizzlies football team represented the University of Montana in the 1955 college football season as a member of the Skyline Conference. The Grizzlies were led by first-year head coach Jerry Williams, played their home games at Dornblaser Field and finished the season with a record of three wins and seven losses (3–7, 2–4 MSC).

== Schedule ==
Date	Opponent	Site	Result	Attendance	Source
September 17	at Houston*	Rice Stadium; Houston, TX	L 12–54	25,000	
September 24	vs. Wyoming	Daylis Stadium; Billings, MT	L 6–35	7,000	
October 1	BYU	Dornblaser Field; Missoula, MT	W 27–13	6,500	
October 8	Denver^{†}	Dornblaser Field; Missoula, MT	L 13–61	9,000–10,000	
October 15	at Utah State	Romney Stadium; Logan, UT	L 6–32	9,000	
October 22	New Mexico	Dornblaser Field; Missoula, MT	W 19–14	5,500	
October 29	Colorado A&M	Dornblaser Field; Missoula, MT	L 7–12	3,500	
November 5	at Montana State*	Gatton Field; Bozeman, MT (rivalry)	W 19–0	7,500	
November 12	at Arizona*	Arizona Stadium; Tucson, AZ	L 0–29	13,000	
November 19	at Idaho*	Neale Stadium; Moscow, ID (Little Brown Stein)	L 0–31	1,500	
*Non-conference game; ^{†}Homecoming

== After the season ==
The following Grizzly was selected in the 1955 NFL draft after the season.

Round	Pick	Player	Position	NFL club
15	174	Don Brant	Back	Philadelphia Eagles
