= 1955 Detroit Titans football team =

American college football season

1955 Detroit Titans football

MVC co-champion
- Conference: Missouri Valley Conference
- Record: 5–3–1 (3–1 MVC)
- Head coach: Wally Fromhart (2nd season)
- Captains: Francis O'Connor; Richard Quadri
- Home stadium: University of Detroit Stadium

1955 Missouri Valley Conference football standings
	Conf.					Overall
Team	W		L		T	W		L		T
Wichita +	3	–	1	–	0	7	–	2	–	1
Detroit +	3	–	1	–	0	5	–	3	–	1
Houston	2	–	2	–	0	6	–	4	–	0
Tulsa	1	–	3	–	0	2	–	7	–	1
Oklahoma A&M	1	–	3	–	0	2	–	8	–	0
+ – Conference co-champions

The 1955 Detroit Titans football team represented the University of Detroit in the Missouri Valley Conference (MVC) during 1955 college football season. In its second year under head coach Wally Fromhart, Detroit compiled a 5–3–1 record (3–1 against conference opponents), tied for the MVC championship, and outscored all opponents by a combined total of 100 to 62.

The team's staff included Kenneth Stilley (line coach, third year), Robert Dove (end coach, first year), John Ray (freshman coach, first year), and Dr. Raymond D. Forsyth (team physician). Tackle Richard Quadri and halfback Francis O'Connor were the team co-captains.

== Schedule ==
Date	Opponent	Site	Result	Attendance	Source
September 23	Toledo	University of Detroit Stadium; Detroit, MI	L 7–12	13,252	
September 30	Wichita	University of Detroit Stadium; Detroit, MI	W 41–0	12,800–12,837	
October 7	Houston	University of Detroit Stadium; Detroit, MI	L 0–7	11,740	
October 15	at Boston College	Fenway Park; Boston, MA	L 0–23	6,458	
October 21	Oklahoma A&M	University of Detroit Stadium; Detroit, MI	W 7–0	16,280	
October 29	at Cincinnati	Nippert Stadium; Cincinnati, OH	T 0–0	17,000	
November 5	at Marquette	Marquette Stadium; Milwaukee, WI	W 20–7	10,000	
November 11	Villanova	University of Detroit Stadium; Detroit, MI	W 6–0	14,350	
November 19	at Tulsa	Skelly Stadium; Tulsa, OK	W 19–13	10,562	
