= 1955 Stanford Indians football team =

American college football season

1955 Stanford Indians football
- Conference: Pacific Coast Conference

Ranking
- Coaches: No. 20
- AP: No. 16
- Record: 6–3–1 (3–2–1 PCC)
- Head coach: Chuck Taylor (5th season)
- Home stadium: Stanford Stadium

1955 Pacific Coast Conference football standings
	Conf.					Overall
Team	W		L		T	W		L		T
No. 4 UCLA $	6	–	0	–	0	9	–	2	–	0
Oregon State	5	–	2	–	0	6	–	3	–	0
No. 16 Stanford	3	–	2	–	1	6	–	3	–	1
Oregon	4	–	3	–	0	6	–	4	–	0
Washington	4	–	3	–	1	5	–	4	–	1
No. 13 USC	3	–	3	–	0	6	–	4	–	0
California	1	–	5	–	1	2	–	7	–	1
Washington State	1	–	5	–	1	1	–	7	–	2
Idaho	0	–	4	–	0	2	–	7	–	0
$ – Conference champion; Rankings from AP Poll

The 1955 Stanford Indians football team represented Stanford University in the Pacific Coast Conference during the 1955 college football season. Led by fifth-year head coach Chuck Taylor, the Indians finished at 6–3–1 overall (3–2–1 in PCC, third), and played home games on campus at Stanford Stadium in Stanford, California.

== Schedule ==
Date	Opponent	Rank	Site	Result	Attendance	Source
September 17	Pacific (CA)*		Stanford Stadium; Stanford, CA	W 33–14	25,000	
September 24	at Oregon State		Multnomah Stadium; Portland, OR	L 0–10	24,748	
October 1	No. 8 Ohio State*		Stanford Stadium; Stanford, CA	W 6–0	28,000	
October 8	at Michigan State*	No. 20	Spartan Stadium; East Lansing, MI	L 14–38	47,586	
October 15	No. 9 UCLA		Stanford Stadium; Stanford, CA	L 13–21	52,000	
October 22	at Washington		Husky Stadium; Seattle, WA	T 7–7	47,500	
October 29	San Jose State*		Stanford Stadium; Stanford, CA (rivalry)	W 34–18	33,000	
November 5	at No. 16 USC		Los Angeles Memorial Coliseum; Los Angeles, CA (rivalry)	W 28–20	63,222	
November 12	Oregon		Stanford Stadium; Stanford, CA	W 44–7	27,000	
November 19	California	No. 18	Stanford Stadium; Stanford, CA (Big Game)	W 19–0	91,500	
*Non-conference game; Rankings from AP Poll released prior to the game; Source:

== NFL draft ==
Two Stanford Indians were selected in the 1956 NFL draft

Player	Position	Round	Pick	NFL club
Paul Wiggin	Defensive end	6	73	Cleveland Browns
Jerry Gustafson	Quarterback	27	315	San Francisco 49ers

- Wiggin was a "future pick" and returned to play for Stanford as a senior in 1956.
