= Mike DeLotto =

American football coach (1912–1983)

Biographical details
- Born: July 17, 1912; Clifton, New Jersey, U.S.
- Died: October 30, 1983 (aged 71); Orange County, California, U.S.

Playing career
- c. 1932: Randolph–Macon
- Position: Fullback

Coaching career (HC unless noted)
- 1955–1957: Long Beach State

Head coaching record
- Overall: 13–10

Marcel Jacob "Mike" DeLotto (July 17, 1912 – October 30, 1983) was an American football coach. He was the first head coach for the Long Beach State 49ers football program. He coached from 1955 to 1957 and compiled a record of 13–10.

DeLotto died of cancer in 1983.

== Head coaching record ==
Year	Team	Overall	Conference	Standing	Bowl/playoffs
Long Beach State 49ers (Independent) (1955)
1955	Long Beach State	5–2			
Long Beach State 49ers (California Collegiate Athletic Association) (1956–1957)
1956	Long Beach State	5–3	0–3	6th	
1957	Long Beach State	3–5	0–3	6th	
Long Beach State:		13–10	0–6		
Total:		13–10			
