= 1955 Idaho Vandals football team =

American college football season

1955 Idaho Vandals football
- Conference: Pacific Coast Conference
- Record: 2–7 (0–4 PCC)
- Head coach: Skip Stahley (2nd season)
- Home stadium: Neale Stadium

1955 Pacific Coast Conference football standings
	Conf.					Overall
Team	W		L		T	W		L		T
No. 4 UCLA $	6	–	0	–	0	9	–	2	–	0
Oregon State	5	–	2	–	0	6	–	3	–	0
No. 16 Stanford	3	–	2	–	1	6	–	3	–	1
Oregon	4	–	3	–	0	6	–	4	–	0
Washington	4	–	3	–	1	5	–	4	–	1
No. 13 USC	3	–	3	–	0	6	–	4	–	0
California	1	–	5	–	1	2	–	7	–	1
Washington State	1	–	5	–	1	1	–	7	–	2
Idaho	0	–	4	–	0	2	–	7	–	0
$ – Conference champion; Rankings from AP Poll

The 1955 Idaho Vandals football team represented the University of Idaho in the 1955 college football season. The Vandals were led by second-year head coach Skip Stahley and were members of the Pacific Coast Conference. Home games were played on campus at Neale Stadium in Moscow, with one home game in Boise at old Bronco Stadium at Boise Junior College.

Idaho compiled a 2–7 overall record and lost all four games in the PCC. After seven losses to open, including three straight shutouts, they won their last two games.

The Vandals lost the Battle of the Palouse with neighbor Washington State, blanked 0–9 at home on October 15. Idaho won the previous year in Pullman, the first win over the Cougars since 1925; the next came in 1964. In the rivalry game with Montana, Idaho ran its winning streak over the Grizzlies to four and retained the Little Brown Stein.

== Schedule ==
Date	Time	Opponent	Site	Result	Attendance	Source
September 17		at Washington	Husky Stadium; Seattle, WA	L 7–14	25,561	
September 24		vs. Utah*	old Bronco Stadium; Boise, ID	L 13–20		
October 1	7:00 pm	at Arizona*	Arizona Stadium; Tucson, AZ	L 14–47	20,000	
October 8	1:30 pm	Pacific (CA)*^{†}	Neale Stadium; Moscow, ID	L 0–20	9,500	
October 15	2:00 pm	Washington State	Neale Stadium; Moscow, ID (Battle of the Palouse)	L 0–9	15,000	
October 29	1:30 pm	at Oregon	Hayward Field; Eugene, OR	L 0–25	9,500	
November 5	1:30 pm	at Oregon State	Parker Stadium; Corvallis, OR	L 14–33	9,000	
November 11		at BYU*	old Cougar Stadium; Provo, UT (Veterans Day)	W 49–6		
November 19	1:30 pm	Montana*	Neale Stadium; Moscow, ID (Little Brown Stein)	W 31–0	1,500	
*Non-conference game; ^{†}Homecoming

== Notable players ==
This Vandal team had two sophomores who went on to extended careers in professional football.

Jerry Kramer of Sandpoint played eleven seasons at right guard with the Green Bay Packers and won five NFL titles (and the first two Super Bowls) under head coach Vince Lombardi. He was an All-Pro five times and was the lead blocker on the famous Packers sweep. Kramer made the NFL's all-decade team for the 1960s and was the last member of the NFL's 50th anniversary team to be inducted into the Pro Football Hall of Fame, at age 82 in 2018.

Wayne Walker of Boise played fifteen seasons with the Detroit Lions as an outside linebacker and was named All-Pro three times. Both were selected in the fourth round of the 1958 NFL draft; Kramer was 39th overall and Walker 45th, and both were periodic placekickers as pros. (As Vandals, Kramer was the kicker and Walker was the long snapper.)

== Coaching staff ==
- Earl Klapstein, line
- Jay Pattee, backs
- Gene Stauber, ends
- Clem Parberry, freshmen

== All-conference ==
No Vandals were on the All-PCC team or the second team. Honorable mention were fullback Wilbur Gary and sophomore center Wayne Walker.

== NFLdraft ==
No Vandals were selected in the 1956 NFL draft. One junior from the 1955 Vandals was selected in the 1957 NFL draft:

Player	Position	Round	Pick	Franchise
Dick Foster	T	11th	129	Washington Redskins

Five sophomores were selected in the 1958 NFL draft:

Player	Position	Round	Pick	Franchise
Jerry Kramer	G	4th	39	Green Bay Packers
Wayne Walker	C	4th	45	Detroit Lions
Larry Aldrich	E	11th	127	Pittsburgh Steelers
Wade Patterson	E	16th	183	Chicago Cardinals
Alvin Johnson	T	18th	216	Cleveland Browns
