= 1955 Houston Cougars football team =

American college football season

1955 Houston Cougars football
- Conference: Missouri Valley Conference
- Record: 6–4 (2–2 MVC)
- Head coach: Bill Meek (1st season)
- Captains: Jim Blackstone; Lavell Isbell
- Home stadium: Rice Stadium

1955 Missouri Valley Conference football standings
	Conf.					Overall
Team	W		L		T	W		L		T
Wichita +	3	–	1	–	0	7	–	2	–	1
Detroit +	3	–	1	–	0	5	–	3	–	1
Houston	2	–	2	–	0	6	–	4	–	0
Tulsa	1	–	3	–	0	2	–	7	–	1
Oklahoma A&M	1	–	3	–	0	2	–	8	–	0
+ – Conference co-champions

The 1955 Houston Cougars football team was an American football team that represented the University of Houston in the Missouri Valley Conference (MVC) during the 1955 college football season. In its first season under head coach Bill Meek, the team compiled a 6–4 record (2–2 against conference opponents) and finished in third place out of five teams in the MVC. Jim Blackstone and Lavell Isbell were the team captains. The team played its home games at Rice Stadium in Houston.

== Schedule ==
Date	Opponent	Site	Result	Attendance	Source
September 17	Montana*	Rice Stadium; Houston, TX	W 54–12	25,000	
October 1	at Texas A&M*	Kyle Field; College Station, TX	L 3–21	26,000	
October 7	at Detroit	University of Detroit Stadium; Detroit, MI	W 7–0	11,740	
October 15	Oklahoma A&M	Rice Stadium; Houston, TX	W 21–13	27,000	
October 22	Texas Tech*	Rice Stadium; Houston, TX (rivalry)	W 7–0	28,000	
October 29	Wichita	Rice Stadium; Houston, TX	L 7–21	18,000	
November 5	at Tulsa	Skelly Stadium; Tulsa, OK	L 14–17	12,059	
November 12	at No. 14 Ole Miss*	Mississippi Veterans Memorial Stadium; Jackson, MS	L 11–27	20,000	
November 19	Villanova*^{†}	Rice Stadium; Houston, TX	W 26–14	12,000	
December 3	Wyoming*	Rice Stadium; Houston, TX	W 26–14	10,000	
*Non-conference game; ^{†}Homecoming; Rankings from AP Poll released prior to the game
