= 1955 BYU Cougars football team =

American college football season

1955 BYU Cougars football
- Conference: Skyline Conference
- Record: 1–9 (0–7 Skyline Six)
- Head coach: Chick Atkinson (7th season)
- Home stadium: Cougar Stadium

1955 Skyline Conference football standings
| | Conf. | | | | | Overall |
| Team | W | | L | | T | W | | L | | T |
|---|---|---|---|---|---|---|---|---|---|---|
| Colorado A&M $ | 6 | – | 1 | – | 0 | 8 | – | 2 | – | 0 |
| Utah | 4 | – | 1 | – | 0 | 6 | – | 3 | – | 0 |
| Denver | 5 | – | 2 | – | 0 | 8 | – | 2 | – | 0 |
| Wyoming | 5 | – | 2 | – | 0 | 8 | – | 3 | – | 0 |
| Utah State | 3 | – | 4 | – | 0 | 4 | – | 6 | – | 0 |
| Montana | 2 | – | 4 | – | 0 | 3 | – | 7 | – | 0 |
| New Mexico | 1 | – | 5 | – | 0 | 2 | – | 8 | – | 0 |
| BYU | 0 | – | 7 | – | 0 | 1 | – | 9 | – | 0 |
$ – Conference champion

The 1955 BYU Cougars football team was an American football team that represented Brigham Young University (BYU) as a member of the Skyline Conference during the 1955 college football season. In their seventh and final season under head coach Chick Atkinson, the Cougars compiled an overall record of 1–9 with a mark of 0–7 against conference opponents, finished last out of eight teams in the Skyline, and were outscored by a total of 300 to 104.

The team's statistical leaders included Don Dixon with 335 passing yards, Phil Oyler with 366 rushing yards and 381 yards of total offense, Owen Skousen with 190 receiving yards, and LeGrand Young with 19 points scored.

== Schedule ==
| Date | Opponent | Site | Result | Attendance | Source |
|---|---|---|---|---|---|
| September 17 | at Oregon State* | Parker Stadium; Corvallis, OR | L 0–33 | 8,000 | |
| September 24 | Los Angeles State* | Cougar Stadium; Provo, UT | W 33–0 | 6,500 | |
| October 1 | at Montana | Dornblaser Field; Missoula, MT | L 13–27 | 6,500 | |
| October 8 | at Utah | Ute Stadium; Salt Lake City, UT (rivalry) | L 9–41 | 29,372 | |
| October 21 | at Denver | DU Stadium; Denver, CO | L 0–33 | 8,000 | |
| October 29 | at Wyoming | War Memorial Stadium; Laramie, WY | L 6–14 | 8,763 | |
| November 5 | Utah State | Cougar Stadium; Provo, UT (rivalry) | L 21–47 | 11,989 | |
| November 11 | Idaho* | Cougar Stadium; Provo, UT | L 6–49 | | |
| November 19 | Colorado A&M | Cougar Stadium; Provo, UT | L 0–35 | 2,157 | |
| November 26 | at New Mexico | Zimmerman Field; Albuquerque, NM | L 16–21 | | |
*Non-conference game
