= 1955 Hardin–Simmons Cowboys football team =

American college football season

1955 Hardin–Simmons Cowboys football
- Conference: Border Conference
- Record: 5–5 (3–2 Border)
- Head coach: Sammy Baugh (1st season)
- Home stadium: Parramore Stadium

1955 Border Conference football standings
	Conf.					Overall
Team	W		L		T	W		L		T
Texas Tech $	3	–	0	–	1	7	–	3	–	1
Arizona State	4	–	1	–	0	8	–	2	–	1
Hardin–Simmons	3	–	2	–	0	5	–	5	–	0
Texas Western	3	–	2	–	1	6	–	2	–	2
Arizona	1	–	2	–	1	5	–	4	–	1
West Texas State	1	–	4	–	1	4	–	4	–	1
New Mexico A&M	0	–	4	–	0	3	–	7	–	0
$ – Conference champion

The 1955 Hardin–Simmons Cowboys football team was an American football team that represented Hardin–Simmons University in the Border Conference during the 1955 college football season. In its first season under head coach Sammy Baugh, the team compiled a 5–5 record (3–2 against conference opponents), finished in third place in the conference, and was outscored by a total of 256 to 221. The team played its home games at Parramore Stadium, also known as Parramore Field, in Abilene, Texas.

No Hardin-Simmons players were named to the 1955 All-Border Conference football team.

== Schedule ==
Date	Time	Opponent	Site	Result	Attendance	Source
September 17		at Baylor*	Baylor Stadium; Waco, TX	L 7–35	20,000	
September 24		at Tulsa*	Skelly Field; Tulsa, OK	L 19–41	13,853	
October 1		New Mexico A&M	Parramore Stadium; Abilene, TX	W 39–0		
October 15	8:00 p.m.	vs. North Texas State*	Broncho Stadium; Odessa, TX	L 19–30	2,500	
October 22		at West Texas State	Buffalo Stadium; Canyon, TX	W 19–18	7,500	
October 29		at Arizona State	Goodwin Stadium; Tempe, AZ	L 14–69		
November 4		Texas Western^{†}	Parramore Stadium; Abilene, TX	W 23–21	5,000	
November 12		at Cincinnati*	Nippert Stadium; Cincinnati, OH	W 53–20	16,000	
November 19		at Trinity (TX)*	Alamo Stadium; San Antonio, TX	W 14–6	10,299	
November 26		at Texas Tech	Jones Stadium; Lubbock, TX	L 14–16	13,000	
*Non-conference game; ^{†}Homecoming; All times are in Central time
