= 1955 Washington State Cougars football team =

American college football season

1955 Washington State Cougars football
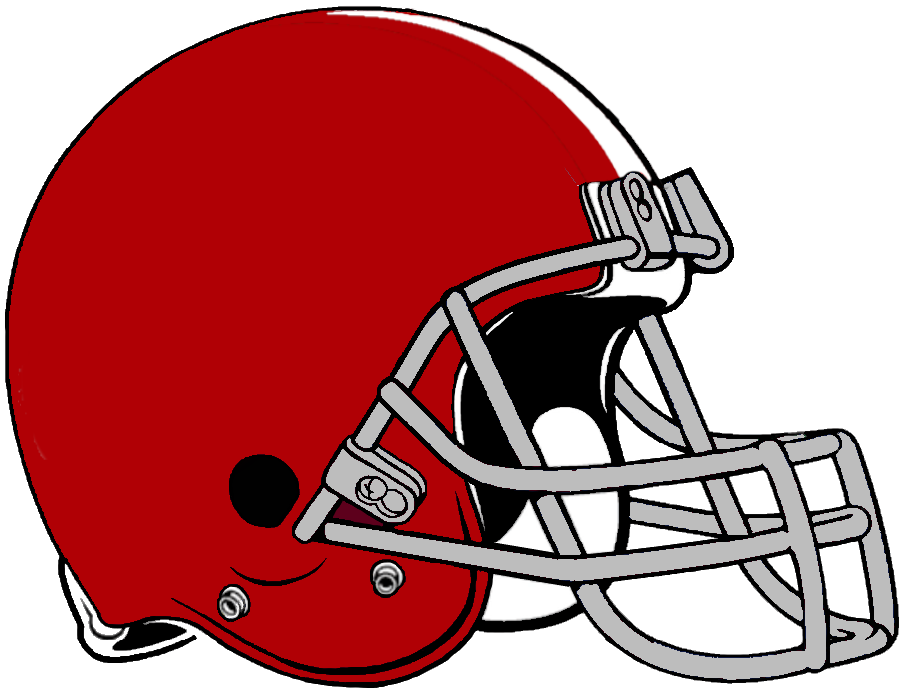
- Conference: Pacific Coast Conference
- Record: 1–7–2 (1–5–1 PCC)
- Head coach: Al Kircher (4th season)
- Home stadium: Rogers Field

1955 Pacific Coast Conference football standings
	Conf.					Overall
Team	W		L		T	W		L		T
No. 4 UCLA $	6	–	0	–	0	9	–	2	–	0
Oregon State	5	–	2	–	0	6	–	3	–	0
No. 16 Stanford	3	–	2	–	1	6	–	3	–	1
Oregon	4	–	3	–	0	6	–	4	–	0
Washington	4	–	3	–	1	5	–	4	–	1
No. 13 USC	3	–	3	–	0	6	–	4	–	0
California	1	–	5	–	1	2	–	7	–	1
Washington State	1	–	5	–	1	1	–	7	–	2
Idaho	0	–	4	–	0	2	–	7	–	0
$ – Conference champion; Rankings from AP Poll

The 1955 Washington State Cougars football team was an American football team that represented Washington State College during the 1955 college football season. In his fourth and final year, head coach Al Kircher led the team to a 1–7–2 record, 1–5–1 in the Pacific Coast Conference (PCC). They played their three home games on campus at Rogers Field in Pullman.

The Cougars' sole victory was in the Battle of the Palouse over neighbor Idaho in Moscow; the Vandals had won the previous year in Pullman, which was their first win in the series in 29 years.

Days after the season ended, Kircher was relieved of his duties with a year remaining on his five-year contract, at $12,500 per year. He opted to stay in Pullman and acquired a motel-restaurant, the Hilltop Lodge, in early 1956. His successor was Jim Sutherland, the Cougars' head coach for eight seasons, through 1963.

== Schedule ==
Date	Opponent	Site	Result	Attendance	Source
September 17	at No. 13 USC	Los Angeles Memorial Coliseum; Los Angeles, CA	L 12–50	35,051	
September 24	at Kansas*	Memorial Stadium; Lawrence, KS	L 0–13	19,000	
October 1	No. 7 UCLA	Rogers Field; Pullman, WA	L 0–55	19,000	
October 8	at California	California Memorial Stadium; Berkeley, CA	T 20–20	33,000	
October 15	at Idaho	Neale Stadium; Moscow, ID (Battle of the Palouse)	W 9–0	13,000	
October 22	at Oregon State	Parker Stadium; Corvallis, OR	L 6–14	17,000	
October 29	at Pacific (CA)*	Pacific Memorial Stadium; Stockton, CA	L 0–30	12,000	
November 5	Oregon^{†}	Rogers Field; Pullman, WA	L 0–35	9,000	
November 12	San Jose State*	Rogers Field; Pullman, WA	T 13–13	1,600	
November 19	at Washington	Husky Stadium; Seattle, WA (rivalry)	L 7–27	30,000	
*Non-conference game; ^{†}Homecoming; Rankings from AP Poll released prior to the game; Source:

== NFL draft ==
Two Cougars were selected in the 1956 NFL draft, which was 30 rounds and 360 selections.

Player	Position	Round	Overall	Franchise
Arnie Pelluer	End	16	192	Los Angeles Rams
Al Paulson	Back	23	276	Los Angeles Rams
