= 1955 Los Angeles State Diablos football team =

American college football season

1955 Los Angeles State Diablos football
- Conference: Independent
- Record: 3–6
- Head coach: Leonard Adams (5th season)
- Home stadium: Snyder Stadium

1955 Western college football independents records
	Conf.			Overall
Team	W	L	T	W		L		T
Long Beach State		–		5	–	2	–	0
Hawaii		–		7	–	4	–	0
San Jose State		–		5	–	3	–	1
Cal Poly San Dimas		–		4	–	3	–	0
La Verne		–		5	–	4	–	0
Pacific (CA)		–		5	–	4	–	0
Air Force		–		4	–	4	–	0
Pepperdine		–		5	–	5	–	0
Los Angeles State		–		3	–	6	–	0
Santa Barbara		–		3	–	6	–	0
UC Riverside		–		1	–	3	–	1

The 1955 Los Angeles State Diablos football team represented Los Angeles State College—now known as California State University, Los Angeles—as an independent during the 1955 college football season. Led by fifth-year head coach Leonard Adams, Los Angeles State compiled a record of 3–6. The Diablos played home games at Snyder Stadium in Los Angeles.

== Schedule ==
Date	Opponent	Site	Result	Attendance	Source
September 24	at BYU	Cougar Stadium (Note: This stadium is the predecessor to the current Cougar Stadium on the BYU campus, which was opened for the 1964 season); Provo, UT	L 0–33	6,500	
September 30	Pomona	Snyder Field; Los Angeles, CA	W 20–13		
October 7	at Occidental	D. W. Patterson Field; Los Angeles, CA	L 7–16		
October 15	at Santa Barbara	La Playa Stadium; Santa Barbara, CA	L 7–14	4,000	
October 21	La Verne	Snyder Field; Los Angeles, CA	W 19–2		
October 28	Terminal Island Navy (Note: Naval Air Station Terminal Island was one of several names for the Naval air station and repair facility located on Terminal Island in Los Angeles County, California from 1938 to 1997)	Snyder Field; Los Angeles, CA	L 0–14		
November 5	at Nevada	Mackay Stadium (Note: This stadium is the predecessor to the current Mackay Stadium, which was opened for the 1966 season.); Reno, NV	L 12–13		
November 11	Whittier	Snyder Field; Los Angeles, CA	W 20–6		
November 18	Pepperdine^{†}	Snyder Field; Los Angeles, CA (Old Shoe)	L 0–6	3,000	
^{†}Homecoming
