= 1956 Sun Bowl =

American college football game

Wyoming Cowboys	Texas Tech Red Raiders
(7–3)	(7–2–1)
Mountain States	Border Conference
21	14
Head coach: Phil Dickens	Head coach: DeWitt Weaver
	1	2	3	4	Total
Wyoming	0	0	7	14	21
Texas Tech	0	0	7	7	14
- Date: January 2, 1956
- Season: 1955
- Stadium: Kidd Field
- Location: El Paso, Texas
- Referee: John Hart (Border; split crew: Border, Mountain States)
- Attendance: 14,500

The 1956 Sun Bowl featured the Wyoming Cowboys and the Texas Tech Red Raiders. This was the first Sun Bowl played on January 2 since 1950.

== Background ==
Texas Tech was the champions of the Border Conference while Wyoming finished fourth in the Skyline Conference.

== Game summary ==
Larry Zowada threw a 53-yard touchdown pass to John Watts to break the scoreless tie for Wyoming. But Tech responded with a Ronnie Herr touchdown run to tie the game going into the fourth quarter. Tech scored in the fourth on Fewin's touchdown run. But that is when Wyoming took over, as Zowada threw another touchdown pass to tie the game up. After Tech received the ball on the kickoff, Don Schmidt fumbled the ball and it was recovered by Pete Kutches. Three plays later, Ova Stapleton scored on a touchdown run, and from that point on the game was sealed for the Cowboys. Jim Crawford rushed for 103 yards on 18 carries and was named MVP.

== Statistics ==
Statistics	Texas Tech	Wyoming
First downs	13	12
Rushing yards	202	129
Passing yards	57	172
Total offense	259	301
Passing	6–14–1	8–12–1
Fumbles–lost	5–3	1–0
Penalties–yards	3–35	10–82
Punts–average	4–34.0	7–30.0

== Aftermath ==
Weaver remained coach and athletic director until 1960. They did not reach the Sun Bowl again until 1964 and not win a bowl game until 1973. Tech has not won a Sun Bowl since 1951.

Wyoming went 10–0 the following season and Crawford led the nation in rushing yards. But believing that they would get a better bowl appearance, they declined the Sun Bowl invitation. No other invitations came. They reached the Sun Bowl again in 1958 and 1966, winning both times.
