= 1955 New Mexico A&M Aggies football team =

American college football season

1955 New Mexico A&M Aggies football
- Conference: Border Conference
- Record: 3–7 (0–4 Border)
- Head coach: Tony Cavallo (1st season)
- Home stadium: Memorial Stadium

1955 Border Conference football standings
	Conf.					Overall
Team	W		L		T	W		L		T
Texas Tech $	3	–	0	–	1	7	–	3	–	1
Arizona State	4	–	1	–	0	8	–	2	–	1
Hardin–Simmons	3	–	2	–	0	5	–	5	–	0
Texas Western	3	–	2	–	1	6	–	2	–	2
Arizona	1	–	2	–	1	5	–	4	–	1
West Texas State	1	–	4	–	1	4	–	4	–	1
New Mexico A&M	0	–	4	–	0	3	–	7	–	0
$ – Conference champion

The 1955 New Mexico A&M Aggies football team was an American football team that represented New Mexico College of Agriculture and Mechanical Arts (now known as New Mexico State University) as a member of the Border Conference during the 1955 college football season. In their first year under head coach Tony Cavallo, the Aggies compiled a 3–7 record (0–4 against conference opponents), finished last in the conference, and were outscored by a total of 226 to 141. The team played home games at Memorial Stadium in Las Cruces, New Mexico.

== Schedule ==
Date	Time	Opponent	Site	Result	Attendance	Source
September 17		at New Mexico*	Zimmerman Field; Albuquerque, NM (rivalry)	L 7–14	10,000	
September 24		New Mexico Highlands*	Memorial Stadium; Las Cruces, NM	L 12–19		
October 1		at Hardin–Simmons	Parramore Stadium; Abilene, TX	L 0–39		
October 8		at Howard Payne*	Lion Stadium; Brownwood, TX	L 12–34		
October 15		West Texas State	Memorial Stadium; Las Cruces, NM	L 6–32		
October 22		Corpus Christi*	Memorial Stadium; Las Cruces, NM	W 19–7		
October 29		at Texas Western	Kidd Field; El Paso, TX (rivalry)	L 6–41	8,000	
November 5	8:00 p.m.	Adams State*	Memorial Stadium; Las Cruces, NM	W 47–8		
November 12		San Diego State*	Memorial Stadium; Las Cruces, NM	W 26–6	4,000	
November 19		at Arizona State	Goodwin Stadium; Tempe, AZ	L 6–26	12,000	
*Non-conference game; All times are in Mountain time
