= 1955 Wyoming Cowboys football team =

American college football season

1955 Wyoming Cowboys football

Sun Bowl champion

Sun Bowl, W 28–14 vs. Texas Tech
- Conference: Skyline Conference
- Record: 8–3 (5–2 Skyline)
- Head coach: Phil Dickens (3rd season)
- Captain: Ray Lutterman
- Home stadium: War Memorial Stadium

1955 Skyline Conference football standings
	Conf.					Overall
Team	W		L		T	W		L		T
Colorado A&M $	6	–	1	–	0	8	–	2	–	0
Utah	4	–	1	–	0	6	–	3	–	0
Denver	5	–	2	–	0	8	–	2	–	0
Wyoming	5	–	2	–	0	8	–	3	–	0
Utah State	3	–	4	–	0	4	–	6	–	0
Montana	2	–	4	–	0	3	–	7	–	0
New Mexico	1	–	5	–	0	2	–	8	–	0
BYU	0	–	7	–	0	1	–	9	–	0
$ – Conference champion

The 1955 Wyoming Cowboys football team was an American football team that represented the University of Wyoming as a member of the Skyline Conference during the 1955 college football season. In their third year under head coach Phil Dickens, the Cowboys compiled an 8-3 record (5–2 against Skyline opponents), finished fourth in the conference, defeated Texas Tech in the 1956 Sun Bowl, and outscored opponents by a total of 225 to 137. They played their home games at War Memorial Stadium in Laramie, Wyoming.

== Schedule ==
Date	Opponent	Site	Result	Attendance	Source
September 17	at Kansas State*	Memorial Stadium; Manhattan, KS	W 38–20	12,000	
September 24	vs. Montana	Daylis Stadium; Billings, MT	W 35–6	7,000	
October 1	Utah State	War Memorial Stadium; Laramie, WY (rivalry)	W 21–13	10,589	
October 8	Colorado A&M	War Memorial Stadium; Laramie, WY (rivalry)	L 13–14	14,000	
October 15	Tulsa*	War Memorial Stadium; Laramie, WY	W 23–19	8,890	
October 22	at Utah	Ute Stadium; Salt Lake City, UT	W 23–13	20,157	
October 29	BYU^{†}	War Memorial Stadium; Laramie, WY	W 14–6	8,763	
November 12	at New Mexico	Zimmerman Field; Albuquerque, NM	W 20–0		
November 24	at Denver	DU Stadium; Denver, CO	L 3–6	25,000	
December 3	at Houston*	Rice Stadium; Houston, TX	L 14–26	10,000	
January 1	vs. Texas Tech*	Kidd Field; El Paso, TX (Sun Bowl)	W 21–14	14,500	
*Non-conference game; ^{†}Homecoming

== 1955 team players in the NFL ==
The following were selected in the 1956 NFL draft.

Player	Position	Round	Overall	NFL Team
Joe Mastrogiovanni	Back	17	198	Philadelphia Eagles
