= 1955 New Mexico Lobos football team =

American college football season

1955 New Mexico Lobos football
- Conference: Skyline Conference
- Record: 2–8 (1–5 Skyline)
- Head coach: Bob Titchenal (3rd season)
- Home stadium: Zimmerman Field

1955 Skyline Conference football standings
	Conf.					Overall
Team	W		L		T	W		L		T
Colorado A&M $	6	–	1	–	0	8	–	2	–	0
Utah	4	–	1	–	0	6	–	3	–	0
Denver	5	–	2	–	0	8	–	2	–	0
Wyoming	5	–	2	–	0	8	–	3	–	0
Utah State	3	–	4	–	0	4	–	6	–	0
Montana	2	–	4	–	0	3	–	7	–	0
New Mexico	1	–	5	–	0	2	–	8	–	0
BYU	0	–	7	–	0	1	–	9	–	0
$ – Conference champion

The 1955 New Mexico Lobos football team represented the University of New Mexico in the Skyline Conference during the 1955 college football season. In their third and final season under head coach Bob Titchenal, the Lobos compiled a 2–8 record (1–5 against Skyline opponents), finished seventh in the conference, were shutout in five games (including four in a row), and were outscored by all opponents by a total of 213 to 61.

After the season ended, the student newspaper (the Lobo) published an editorial criticizing Titchenal for the team's poor showing, pointing out that the university had expended $80,000 for football players since 1953 and noting that the teams had gotten steadily worse under Titchenal. Titchenal responded with a press conference in which he stated that he had done the best he could under university policy, which did not allow him to grant athletic scholarships and which had cut the team's equipment budget in half. Titchenal was ultimately fired as the school's football coach on December 7, 1955.

== Schedule ==
Date	Opponent	Site	Result	Attendance	Source
September 17	New Mexico A&M*	Zimmerman Field; Albuquerque, NM (rivalry)	W 14–7	10,000	
September 24	at Colorado A&M	Colorado Field; Fort Collins, CO	L 0–25	2,772	
October 1	Texas Western*	Zimmerman Field; Albuquerque, NM	L 0–34		
October 8	at Utah State	Romney Stadium; Logan, UT	L 0–18		
October 15	San Jose State*	Zimmerman Field; Albuquerque, NM	L 0–14	8,000	
October 22	at Montana	Dornblaser Field; Missoula, MT	L 14–19	5,500	
October 29	Denver^{†}	Zimmerman Field; Albuquerque, NM	L 6–33	10,200	
November 12	Wyoming	Zimmerman Field; Albuquerque, NM	L 0–20		
November 19	at Arizona*	Arizona Stadium; Tucson, AZ (rivalry)	L 6–27		
November 26	BYU	Zimmerman Field; Albuquerque, NM	W 21–16		
*Non-conference game; ^{†}Homecoming
