= 1955 Colorado A&M Aggies football team =

American college football season

1955 Colorado A&M Aggies football

Skyline champion
- Conference: Skyline Conference
- Record: 8–2 (6–1 Skyline)
- Head coach: Bob Davis (9th season)
- Home stadium: Colorado Field

1955 Skyline Conference football standings
	Conf.					Overall
Team	W		L		T	W		L		T
Colorado A&M $	6	–	1	–	0	8	–	2	–	0
Utah	4	–	1	–	0	6	–	3	–	0
Denver	5	–	2	–	0	8	–	2	–	0
Wyoming	5	–	2	–	0	8	–	3	–	0
Utah State	3	–	4	–	0	4	–	6	–	0
Montana	2	–	4	–	0	3	–	7	–	0
New Mexico	1	–	5	–	0	2	–	8	–	0
BYU	0	–	7	–	0	1	–	9	–	0
$ – Conference champion

The 1955 Colorado A&M Aggies football team represented Colorado State College of Agriculture and Mechanic Arts in the Skyline Conference during the 1955 college football season. In their ninth and final season under head coach Bob Davis, the Aggies compiled an 8–2 record (6–1 against Skyline opponents), won the conference championship, and outscored all opponents by a total of 175 to 108.

Three Colorado Agricultural players received all-conference honors in 1955: halfback Gary Glick, center Bob Weber, and guard Dan Mirich. Bob Davis was also named Skyline Conference Coach of the Year.

The team's statistical leaders included Jerry Callahan with 302 passing yards, Gary Glick with 579 rushing yards and 48 points scored, and Gary Sanders with 351 receiving yards.

Bob Davis resigned as Colorado A&M's head football coach in January 1956 in order to devote his full energy to his duties as the school's athletic director.

== Schedule ==
Date	Opponent	Site	Result	Attendance	Source
September 17	at Arizona*	Arizona Stadium; Tucson, AZ	L 7–20	22,500	
September 24	New Mexico	Colorado Field; Fort Collins, CO	W 25–0	2,772	
October 1	Denver	Colorado Field; Fort Collins, CO	W 20–19	10,233	
October 8	at Wyoming	War Memorial Stadium; Laramie, WY (rivalry)	W 14–13	14,000	
October 22	Utah State^{†}	Colorado Field; Fort Collins, CO	W 26–9	6,065	
October 29	at Montana	Dornblaser Field; Missoula, MT	W 12–7	3,500	
November 5	at Oklahoma A&M*	Lewis Field; Stillwater, OK	W 20–13	21,500	
November 12	at Utah	Ute Stadium; Salt Lake City, UT	L 6–27	14,873	
November 19	at BYU	Cougar Stadium; Provo, UT	W 35–0	2,157	
November 26	Colorado*	Colorado Field; Fort Collins, CO (rivalry)	W 10–0	8,999	
*Non-conference game; ^{†}Homecoming
