= 1955 UCLA Bruins football team =

American college football season

1955 UCLA Bruins football

PCC champion

Rose Bowl, L 14–17 vs. Michigan State
- Conference: Pacific Coast Conference

Ranking
- Coaches: No. 4
- AP: No. 4
- Record: 9–2 (6–0 PCC)
- Head coach: Red Sanders (7th season)
- Offensive scheme: Single-wing
- Home stadium: Los Angeles Memorial Coliseum

1955 Pacific Coast Conference football standings
	Conf.					Overall
Team	W		L		T	W		L		T
No. 4 UCLA $	6	–	0	–	0	9	–	2	–	0
Oregon State	5	–	2	–	0	6	–	3	–	0
No. 16 Stanford	3	–	2	–	1	6	–	3	–	1
Oregon	4	–	3	–	0	6	–	4	–	0
Washington	4	–	3	–	1	5	–	4	–	1
No. 13 USC	3	–	3	–	0	6	–	4	–	0
California	1	–	5	–	1	2	–	7	–	1
Washington State	1	–	5	–	1	1	–	7	–	2
Idaho	0	–	4	–	0	2	–	7	–	0
$ – Conference champion; Rankings from AP Poll

The 1955 UCLA Bruins football team was an American football team that represented the University of California, Los Angeles in the Pacific Coast Conference (PCC) during the 1955 college football season. In their seventh year under head coach Red Sanders, the Bruins compiled a 9–1 record in the regular season (6–0 in PCC, first) to secure their third consecutive conference title, but lost to second-ranked Michigan State by three points in the Rose Bowl to finish at 9–2.

== Schedule ==
Date	Opponent	Rank	Site	Result	Attendance	Source
September 16	Texas A&M*	No. 1	Los Angeles Memorial Coliseum; Los Angeles, CA	W 21–0	63,334	
September 24	at No. 5 Maryland*	No. 1	Byrd Stadium; College Park, MD	L 0–7	46,000	
October 1	at Washington State	No. 7	Rogers Field; Pullman, WA	W 55–0	19,000	
October 7	Oregon State	No. 7	Los Angeles Memorial Coliseum; Los Angeles, CA	W 38–0	57,664	
October 15	at Stanford	No. 9	Stanford Stadium; Stanford, CA	W 21–13	52,000	
October 21	Iowa*	No. 7	Los Angeles Memorial Coliseum; Los Angeles, CA	W 33–13	75,692	
October 29	California	No. 6	Los Angeles Memorial Coliseum; Los Angeles, CA (rivalry)	W 47–0	56,980	
November 5	at Pacific (CA)*	No. 5	Pacific Memorial Stadium; Stockton, CA	W 34–0	26,000	
November 12	Washington	No. 4	Los Angeles Memorial Coliseum; Los Angeles, CA	W 19–17	47,519	
November 19	at USC	No. 5	Los Angeles Memorial Coliseum; Los Angeles, CA (Victory Bell)	W 17–7	95,878	
January 2, 1956	vs. No. 2 Michigan State*	No. 4	Rose Bowl; Pasadena, CA (Rose Bowl)	L 14–17	100,809	
*Non-conference game; Rankings from AP Poll released prior to the game; Source:

The game against Washington on November 12 was referenced in the 1989 film Back to the Future Part II; the older Biff Tannen traveled back in time to give his younger self a sports almanac, and he referenced this game to verify its accuracy.
