= 1955 Utah Utes football team =

American college football season

1955 Utah Utes football
- Conference: Skyline Conference
- Record: 6–3 (4–1 Skyline)
- Head coach: Jack Curtice (6th season)
- Home stadium: Ute Stadium

1955 Skyline Conference football standings
	Conf.					Overall
Team	W		L		T	W		L		T
Colorado A&M $	6	–	1	–	0	8	–	2	–	0
Utah	4	–	1	–	0	6	–	3	–	0
Denver	5	–	2	–	0	8	–	2	–	0
Wyoming	5	–	2	–	0	8	–	3	–	0
Utah State	3	–	4	–	0	4	–	6	–	0
Montana	2	–	4	–	0	3	–	7	–	0
New Mexico	1	–	5	–	0	2	–	8	–	0
BYU	0	–	7	–	0	1	–	9	–	0
$ – Conference champion

The 1955 Utah Utes football team, or also commonly known as the Utah Redskins, was an American football team that represented the University of Utah as a member of the Skyline Conference during the 1955 college football season. In their sixth season under head coach Jack Curtice, the Utes compiled an overall record of 6–3 with a mark of 4–1 against conference opponents, placing second in the Skyline.

== Schedule ==
Date	Opponent	Site	Result	Attendance	Source
September 17	Oregon*	Ute Stadium; Salt Lake City, UT	L 13–14	21,578	
September 24	vs. Idaho*	Bronco Stadium; Boise, ID	W 20–13		
October 1	at Missouri*	Memorial Stadium; Columbia, MO	W 20–14	23,000	
October 8	BYU	Ute Stadium; Salt Lake City, UT (rivalry)	W 41–9	29,372	
October 14	at Denver	DU Stadium; Denver, CO	W 27–7	22,000	
October 22	Wyoming^{†}	Ute Stadium; Salt Lake City, UT	L 13–23	20,157	
November 5	at Colorado*	Folsom Field; Boulder, CO (rivalry)	L 7–37	20,500	
November 12	Colorado A&M	Ute Stadium; Salt Lake City, UT	W 27–6	14,873	
November 24	Utah State	Ute Stadium; Salt Lake City, UT (rivalry)	W 14–13	15,742	
*Non-conference game; ^{†}Homecoming

== NFL draft ==
Utah had two players selected in the 1956 NFL draft.

Player	Position	Round	Pick	NFL team
Herb Nakken	Back	5	53	Los Angeles Rams
Jack Kammerman	End	26	313	Cleveland Browns
