= 1955 California Golden Bears football team =

American college football season

1955 California Golden Bears football
- Conference: Pacific Coast Conference
- Record: 2–7–1 (1–5–1 PCC)
- Head coach: Pappy Waldorf (9th season)
- Home stadium: California Memorial Stadium

1955 Pacific Coast Conference football standings
	Conf.					Overall
Team	W		L		T	W		L		T
No. 4 UCLA $	6	–	0	–	0	9	–	2	–	0
Oregon State	5	–	2	–	0	6	–	3	–	0
No. 16 Stanford	3	–	2	–	1	6	–	3	–	1
Oregon	4	–	3	–	0	6	–	4	–	0
Washington	4	–	3	–	1	5	–	4	–	1
No. 13 USC	3	–	3	–	0	6	–	4	–	0
California	1	–	5	–	1	2	–	7	–	1
Washington State	1	–	5	–	1	1	–	7	–	2
Idaho	0	–	4	–	0	2	–	7	–	0
$ – Conference champion; Rankings from AP Poll

The 1955 California Golden Bears football team was an American football team that represented the University of California, Berkeley as a member of the Pacific Coast Conference (PCC) during the 1955 college football season. Under ninth-year head coach Pappy Waldorf, the Golden Bears compiled an overall record of 2–7–1 with a mark of 1–5–1 conference play, trying for seventh place in the PCC. The team played on campus, at California Memorial Stadium in Berkeley, California.

== Schedule ==
Date	Time	Opponent	Site	Result	Attendance	Source
September 17	10:30 a.m.	at Pittsburgh*	Pitt Stadium; Pittsburgh, PA	L 7–27	33,999–34,976	
September 24		Illinois*	California Memorial Stadium; Berkeley, CA	L 13–20	32,000	
October 1		Penn*	California Memorial Stadium; Berkeley, CA	W 27–7	21,000	
October 8		Washington State	California Memorial Stadium; Berkeley, CA	T 20–20	33,000	
October 15		at Oregon	Multnomah Stadium; Portland, OR	L 0–21	21,515	
October 22		No. 10 USC	California Memorial Stadium; Berkeley, CA	L 6–33	51,000	
October 29		at No. 6 UCLA	Los Angeles Memorial Coliseum; Los Angeles, CA (rivalry)	L 0–47	56,980	
November 5		Washington	California Memorial Stadium; Berkeley, CA	W 20–6	24,000	
November 12		Oregon State	California Memorial Stadium; Berkeley, CA	L 14–16	35,000	
November 19		at No. 18 Stanford	Stanford Stadium; Stanford, CA (Big Game)	L 0–19	91,500	
*Non-conference game; Rankings from AP Poll released prior to the game; All times are in Pacific time; Source:
