= Robert V. Whitlow =

Robert Whitlow
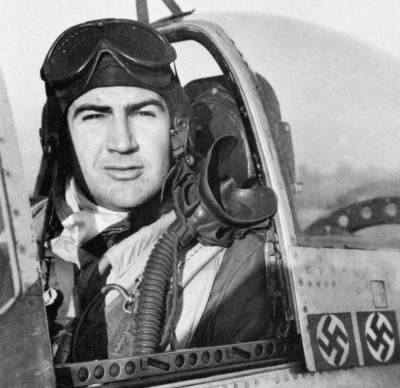
- Whitlow in his P-51 which bears markings from his two aerial kills on November 26, 1944

Biographical details
- Born: November 7, 1918; Calwa, California, U.S.
- Died: July 11, 1997 (aged 78); Harbor Point, Michigan, U.S.

Playing career
- 1940–1943: Army
- Positions: Tackle (football); Pitcher (baseball)

Coaching career (HC unless noted)
- ?: Army (assistant)
- 1947: El Colegio Militar de Mexico
- 1955: Air Force

Administrative career (AD unless noted)
- 1954–1957: Air Force
- 1963–1965: Chicago Cubs

Head coaching record
- Overall: 4–4

Robert V. Whitlow (November 7, 1918 – July 11, 1997) was an American military officer, football coach, university athletic director, and sports club executive. He served as the first head football coach and athletic director of the United States Air Force Academy in 1955. Whitlow had a twenty-year career in the United States Air Force, and during World War II, saw combat as both a bomber and fighter pilot. After his military service, he worked for the Chicago Cubs baseball franchise as its first "athletic director."

== Early life and education ==
Whitlow was born in Calwa, California on November 7, 1918, to Victor and Elizabeth (née Drenth) Whitlow. He attended Fairfax High School and the University of California, Los Angeles. Whitlow then went on to the United States Military Academy, where he earned letters in football as a tackle, baseball as a pitcher, and basketball. On October 13, 1942, he pitched five innings as the starter against the New York Giants, and when he was removed from the game, the score was a 2–2 stalemate. He started again on May 27 against Navy, and helped Army to a 10–3 win, its first of the series since 1914. Whitlow earned his pilot wings as a first class cadet (senior), and was assigned to heavy bombers because of his large stature after graduating in January 1943.

== Military service ==
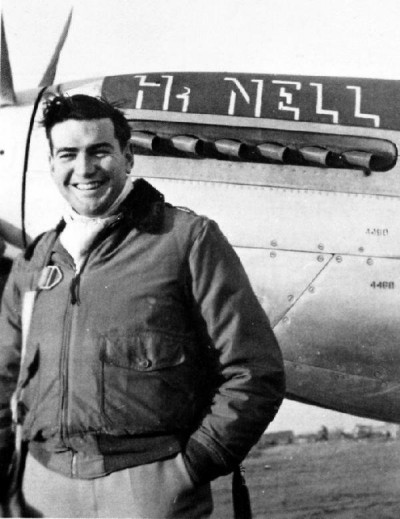
Whitlow in front of his P-51D, "Hi Nell".

Whitlow served in the Second World War and saw aerial combat, initially as a B-24 Liberator pilot with the 458th Bombardment Group. He later piloted P-51 Mustangs on reconnaissance missions with the Eighth Air Force Scouting Group. In 1944, The Los Angeles Times reported on one of his aerial engagements in which he shot down a German Focke-Wulf Fw 190 fighter. All told, he logged 550 combat hours over the course of one bomber and three fighter tours, and destroyed eight enemy aircraft. Whitlow received the Silver Star, four Distinguished Flying Crosses, and eight Air Medals.

In the late 1940s, Major Whitlow served as an assistant coach for the Army football team at the United States Military Academy. In 1947, while assigned to the Air Staff at the Pentagon, Whitlow was selected for an officer exchange with the Mexican military academy, El Colegio Militar de Mexico. His duties there included coaching the Mexican cadets in football. Whitlow guided a Mexican team to victory against an American team from Randolph Air Force Base, which included Doc Blanchard and Arnold Tucker, in a December game he organized in Mexico City called the "Silver Bowl". He was awarded the Mérito Militar de Mexico.

=== Air Force Academy ===
In 1955, Whitlow was appointed the head football coach and athletic director at the newly created United States Air Force Academy. He served in that role for one season, and was replaced by Lawrence "Buck" Shaw. After the 1956 Air Force football team went 6–2–1, athletic director Whitlow turned down a bid offered for the Junior Rose Bowl. He wired the bowl organizers to inform them that the superintendent, Major General James Briggs, had "disapproved participation of [the] Air Force Academy football team in post-season competition" after consulting with The Pentagon.

In 1957, his three-year tour of duty ended, and he was reassigned within the Air Force. In the 1960s, he held assignments in Germany and France. Whitlow was then assigned to Air Defense Sector, Montana and qualified on the F-101 Voodoo fighter.

== Later life ==
Whitlow retired from the U.S. Air Force in 1963 at the rank of colonel, and was appointed as "athletic director" of the Chicago Cubs baseball club. The position was created as part of the College of Coaches experiment, and outranked general manager John Holland. The unique arrangement was widely ridiculed by people associated with the franchise. One of his contributions was the installation of weight training equipment in the team's clubhouse, an uncommon practice at the time. Less well-received was his construction of a batter's background screen which doubled the height of the barrier and was derided as "Whitlow's wall". Whitlow remained with the organization for two years.

In the 1980s, Whitlow was the president of the "Arizona Firebirds", a group of investors that sought to bring a National Football League expansion franchise to Phoenix. In 1984, commenting on widespread speculation that the Philadelphia Eagles would relocate to Arizona, Whitlow said, "Until they're actually here, I won't accept it ... I'm really very surprised that anything is this close, especially because they don't have their own place to play. This doesn't seem very wise from the Eagles' point of view." Whitlow also owned the Phoenix Roadrunners minor league hockey team.

Whitlow died on July 11, 1997, at his summer home in Harbor Point, Michigan.

== Head coaching record ==
Year	Team	Overall	Bowl/playoffs
Air Force Falcons (Independent) (1955)
1955	Air Force	4–4	
Air Force:		4–4	
Total:		4–4	
