= Kenneth Knox =

American football and track coach and college athletics administrator

Biographical details
- Born: September 13, 1920; Brazeau, Missouri, U.S.
- Died: February 24, 1970 (aged 49); Cape Girardeau, Missouri, U.S.

Playing career

Football
- 1946: Southeast Missouri State

Coaching career (HC unless noted)

Football
- 1948–1951: Sikeston HS (MO)
- 1952–1967: Southeast Missouri State

Track
- 1952–?: Southeast Missouri State

Administrative career (AD unless noted)
- ?–1970: Southeast Missouri State

Head coaching record
- Overall: 88–59–4 (college football); 35–0–3 (high school football)

Accomplishments and honors

Championships
- Football; 6 MIAA (1955, 1957–1959, 1962, 1967)

Kenneth B. Knox (September 13, 1920 – February 24, 1970) was an American football and track coach and college athletics administrator. He served as the head football coach at Southeast Missouri State College—now known as Southeast Missouri State University—from 1952 to 1967, compiling a record of 88–59–4. Knox also coached track at Southeast Missouri State and was the school's athletic director until his death in early 1970.

Knox was born in Brazeau, Missouri and attended high school in Perryville, Missouri. He served in the United States Navy in the Pacific during World War II, reaching the rank of lieutenant commander before his discharge. Knox played college football at Southeast Missouri State, where was a member of the Emmett Stuber's undefeated 1946 team and graduated in 1948. He began his coaching career in 1948 at Sikeston High School in Sikeston, Missouri, where he led his football teams to a record of 35–0–3 in four seasons. He was hired as head coach in football and track at his alma mater, Southeast Missouri State, in 1952.

Knox died on February 24, 1970, at Southeast Missouri Hospital in Cape Girardeau, Missouri, following a long illness.

== Head coaching record ==
=== College football ===
Year	Team	Overall	Conference	Standing	Bowl/playoffs
Southeast Missouri State Indians (Missouri Intercollegiate Athletic Association) (1952–1967)
1952	Southeast Missouri State	4–4	2–3	4th	
1953	Southeast Missouri State	4–3–2	1–2–2	5th	
1954	Southeast Missouri State	7–2	4–1	2nd	
1955	Southeast Missouri State	9–0	5–0	1st	
1956	Southeast Missouri State	2–7	0–5	6th	
1957	Southeast Missouri State	6–2–1	4–0–1	1st	
1958	Southeast Missouri State	7–1–1	5–0	1st	
1959	Southeast Missouri State	7–2	5–0	1st	
1960	Southeast Missouri State	6–4	4–1	2nd	
1961	Southeast Missouri State	5–5	3–2	T–2nd	
1962	Southeast Missouri State	7–3	5–0	1st	
1963	Southeast Missouri State	4–6	2–3	T–3rd	
1964	Southeast Missouri State	5–5	4–1	2nd	
1965	Southeast Missouri State	2–8	2–3	4th	
1966	Southeast Missouri State	5–5	4–1	2nd	
1967	Southeast Missouri State	8–2	5–0	1st	
Southeast Missouri State:		88–59–4	55–22–3		
Total:		88–59–4			
National championship Conference title Conference division title or championship game berth
