= 1955 college football season =

American college football season

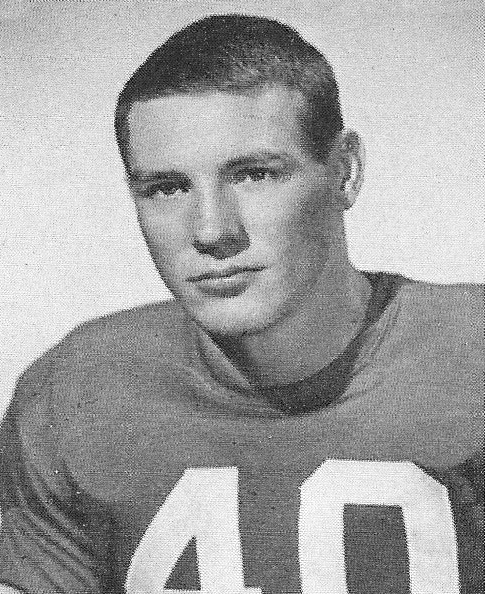
- Heisman Trophy winner Howard Cassady
- First AP No. 1 of season: UCLA
- Number of bowls: 7
- Champion(s): Oklahoma (AP, Coaches, FWAA)
- Heisman: Howard Cassady (halfback, Ohio State)

The 1955 college football season was the 87th season of intercollegiate football in the United States. It concluded with two teams recognized as a national champion:

- Oklahoma compiled an 11–0 record in its 11th season under Bud Wilkinson. The Sooners were ranked No. 1 in the final Associated Press (AP) and United Press (UP) coaches polls. Securing their claim as national champion, Oklahoma defeated No.2 Maryland, 20–6, in the Orange Bowl. The 1955 season was part of a 47-game winning streak that ran from October 10, 1953, to November 9, 1957.
- Grambling compiled a 10–0 record in their 13th season under Eddie Robinson, defeated Florida A&M in the Orange Blossom Classic, and was selected as the black college national champion.

Other teams compiling perfect seasons in 1955 included Miami (OH) (9–0, AP No. 15 under Ara Parseghian); Hillsdale (declined Tangerine Bowl bid after being told national scoring champion and African-American Nate Clark must stay home); Trinity (CT) (consecutive perfect seasons); and Whitworth (part of 21-game winning streak).

Ohio State halfback Howard Cassady won the Heisman Trophy and the Maxwell Award. Individual statistical leaders in major college football in 1955 included Navy quarterback George Welsh with 1,348 yards of total offense and 1,319 passing yards; Arizona tailback Art Luppino with 1,313 rushing yards; Missouri end Hank Burnine with 594 receiving yards; and TCU halfback Jim Swink with 125 points scored.

== Conference and program changes ==
=== Conference changes ===
- One conference began play in 1955:
  - Presidents' Athletic Conference – an active NCAA Division III conference
- One conference played its final season in 1955:
  - Texas Collegiate Athletic Conference – active since the 1926 season
- One conference changed its name prior to the 1955 season:
  - The New Mexico Intercollegiate Conference became the Frontier Conference, the name it retained until its demise after the 1962 season

=== Membership changes ===
| School | 1954 conference | 1955 conference |
|---|---|---|
| Air Force | New Program | Independent |
| Fordham Rams | Independent | Dropped program |
| Western Reserve Red Cats | Mid-American Conference | Presidents' Athletic Conference |

== September ==
In the preseason poll released on September 12, 1955, the UCLA Bruins, 1954's co-champions, received 33 first place votes, while Oklahoma had 32. Michigan had 34 votes, but the third most points overall. Other teams nominated for the top spot were defending AP champ Ohio State, Maryland, Notre Dame, Navy, Miami, Georgia Tech, Iowa, USC, Duke, West Virginia, and Purdue. As the regular season progressed, a new poll would be issued on the Monday following the weekend's games. The preseason Top Five were No. 1 UCLA, No. 2 Oklahoma, No. 3 Michigan, No. 4 Ohio State, and No. 5 Maryland.

On Friday, September 16, No. 1 UCLA opened in Los Angeles with a 21–0 win over visiting Texas A&M. September 17, Oklahoma, Michigan and Ohio State were idle, but No. 5 Maryland edged Missouri on the road, 13–12. No. 10 Georgia Tech, which had beaten No. 9 Miami 14–6 in Atlanta, rose to 2nd place in the next poll: No. 1 UCLA, No. 2 Georgia Tech, No. 3 Oklahoma, No. 4 Michigan, and No. 5 Maryland.

On September 24, No. 1 UCLA and No. 5 Maryland met at College Park, before a record crowd. UCLA's Doug Peters plunged into the end zone in the first half, but fumbled the ball before crossing the goal line. In the second half, the home team Terrapins had the ball 17 yards from goal, on fourth down. Rather than kicking a field goal, Ed Vereb ran for the winning touchdown, giving Maryland a 7–0 win. No. 2 Georgia Tech won at No. 19 Florida, 14–7. No. 3 Oklahoma won at North Carolina 13–6. No. 4 Michigan beat Missouri 42–7. Maryland took over the top spot, while UCLA fell to 7th. No. 11 Notre Dame, which had beaten SMU 17–0, moved into the Top 5: No. 1 Maryland, No. 2 Michigan, No. 3 Georgia Tech, No. 4 Notre Dame, and No. 5 Oklahoma.

== October ==
October 1, No. 1 Maryland won 20–6 at No. 20 Baylor in Texas. No. 2 Michigan beat Michigan State 14–7 before a crowd of 97,239 at home in Ann Arbor. MSU had tied the score 7–7 after an errant punt by Michigan gave them the ball 39 yards from goal. Minutes later, Earl Morrall's punt was blocked to give Michigan the ball on the MSU 21, from which the winning score was made. No. 3 Georgia Tech beat SMU 20–7 in Atlanta. No. 4 Notre Dame defeated Indiana 19–0. No. 5 Oklahoma beat No. 12 Pittsburgh 26–14, marking its 21st consecutive win. The next poll: No. 1 Maryland, No. 2 Michigan, No. 3 Oklahoma, No. 4 Georgia Tech, and No. 5 Notre Dame.

October 8 No. 1 Maryland beat Wake Forest 28–7, and No. 2 Michigan defeated visiting No. 6 Army, 26–2. Both stayed unbeaten, but Michigan took the top spot in the next poll. No. 3 Oklahoma defeated Texas 20–0 in Dallas. No. 4 Georgia Tech won 7–0 at LSU. No. 5 Notre Dame won 14–0 at No. 15 Miami, with both touchdowns coming on fourth down passes from Paul Hornung, before an Orange Bowl record crowd of 75,685. In a game that would eventually decide the Pacific Coast Conference title, No. 7 UCLA beat Oregon State 38–0. The next poll: No. 1 Michigan, No. 2 Maryland, No. 3 Oklahoma, No. 4 Notre Dame, and No. 5 Georgia Tech.

October 15 No. 1 Michigan defeated Northwestern, 14–2. No. 2 Maryland won at North Carolina, 25–7. No. 3 Oklahoma beat Kansas 44–6. However, No. 5 Georgia Tech lost to visiting No. 17 Auburn 14–12, and No. 4 Notre Dame lost 21–7 when it hosted No. 13 Michigan State. They dropped from the top five and were replaced by No. 8 Navy (which had won 34–14 at Penn State) and No. 11 Duke (which had won at No. 14 Ohio State, 20–14). The poll: No. 1 Michigan, No. 2 Maryland, No. 3 Oklahoma, No. 4 Navy, and No. 5 Duke.

October 22 In Minneapolis, No. 1 Michigan faced a 1–3–0 Minnesota team and was stunned when the Gophers racked up two touchdowns in the first quarter. Michigan's Terry Barr blocked the extra point attempt on the second touchdown, but the nation's No. 1 team was losing 13–0. Still down 13–7 at the half, the Wolverines fought back. Jim Van Pelt passed to Tom Maentz for a touchdown, and Van Pelt added the extra point to save Michigan, 14–13. Minnesota would go on to a 3–6–0 finish. Meanwhile, No. 2 Maryland won more convincingly at Syracuse, 34–13, to regain the top spot. No. 3 Oklahoma beat No. 14 Colorado, 56–21. No. 4 Navy won at Penn, 33–0. No. 5 Duke lost to Pitt, 26–7, and was replaced in the top five by No. 6 Michigan State, which beat Illinois 21–7. The next poll: No. 1 Maryland, No. 2 Oklahoma, No. 3 Michigan, No. 4 Navy, and No. 5 Michigan State.

October 29 Back at the top, No. 1 Maryland beat South Carolina 27–0, while No. 2 Oklahoma won at Kansas State, 40–7. No. 3 Michigan beat Iowa 33–21. No. 4 Navy lost at No. 9 Notre Dame, 21–7. No. 5 Michigan State won at Wisconsin, 27–0. UCLA returned to the Top Five from No. 6 after a 47–0 win over California. The next poll: No. 1 Maryland, No. 2 Oklahoma, No. 3 Michigan, No. 4 Michigan State, and No. 5 UCLA.

== November ==
November 5 As both stayed undefeated, No. 1 Maryland beat LSU 13–0 and No. 2 Oklahoma won at Missouri, 20–0. No. 3 Michigan lost at Illinois 25–6, while No. 4 Michigan State won at Purdue, 27–0. No. 5 UCLA won at Pacific, 34–0. No. 6 Notre Dame, which had won at Penn 46–14, returned to the top five. The next poll: No. 1 Oklahoma, No. 2 Maryland, No. 3 Michigan State, No. 4 UCLA, and No. 5.Notre Dame.

November 12 Back at No. 1, Oklahoma beat Iowa State 52–0. No. 2 Maryland won at Clemson, 25–12. No. 3 Michigan State beat Minnesota 42–14. No. 4 UCLA was trailing Washington 17–16 in the closing seconds, but Jim Decker kicked a field goal for a 19–17 victory. The game is referenced in Back to the Future Part II. No. 5 Notre Dame won at North Carolina, 27–7. The next poll: No. 1 Oklahoma, No. 2 Maryland, No. 3 Michigan State, No. 4 Notre Dame, and No. 5 UCLA. The UCLA game and its unlikely winning field goal was used by an elderly Biff Tannen from 2015 to demonstrate the fact that his Gray's Sports Almanac can predict the winning outcome of any major sports game between 1950 and 2000 to his younger self from 1955. He listens in to a live radio commentary of the game when the score was 17-16. Old Biff bets on UCLA winning, with his younger self pointing out the fact that the game is essentially over. The winning field goal is then kicked, proving that the almanac is accurate. The other games of the day were later heard over the same radio, with young Biff further testing out the almanac's capabilities.

November 19 Although No. 1 Oklahoma was 8–0–0 and host Nebraska was 5–4–0, both had 5–0–0 records in Big 7 conference play when they met at Lincoln. The Sooners rolled, 41–0, to get the Orange Bowl bid. No. 2 Maryland closed its season with a 19–0 win over George Washington University and accepted the invitation to meet Oklahoma, but what would have been a No. 1 vs. No. 2 meeting changed when the Terrapins were dropped to third by the AP voters. No. 3 Michigan State, which had a 5–1 record in Big Ten play, beat Marquette 33–0 in a non-conference game. No. 6 Michigan's 17–0 loss to No. 9 Ohio State gave the Wolverines a 5–2 conference mark and knocked them out of contention for the Rose Bowl. Ohio State had the best record in the Big Ten, 6–0 overall, but had gone to the Rose Bowl the year before, so Michigan State got the bid. The Spartans' opponent would be No. 5 UCLA, which beat USC 17–7. No. 4 Notre Dame beat Iowa 17–14. Though Maryland, like Oklahoma, was unbeaten, the voters put once-beaten Michigan State in the second spot instead. The next poll: No. 1 Oklahoma, No. 2 Michigan State, No. 3 Maryland, No. 4 UCLA, and No. 5 Notre Dame.

On November 26, No. 5 Notre Dame lost in Los Angeles to USC, 42–20, and dropped to 6th in the final AP poll, where it would be replaced at No. 5 by Ohio State. The top four teams (Oklahoma, Michigan State, Maryland, and UCLA) had finished their seasons and were ranked in the same order in the final poll.

== Conference standings ==
=== Major conference standings ===
For this article, major conferences defined as those including at least one state flagship public university and the Ivy League.

1955 Atlantic Coast Conference football standings
| | Conf. | | | | | Overall |
| Team | W | | L | | T | W | | L | | T |
|---|---|---|---|---|---|---|---|---|---|---|
| No. 3 Maryland + | 4 | – | 0 | – | 0 | 10 | – | 1 | – | 0 |
| Duke + | 4 | – | 0 | – | 0 | 7 | – | 2 | – | 1 |
| Clemson | 3 | – | 1 | – | 0 | 7 | – | 3 | – | 0 |
| Wake Forest | 3 | – | 3 | – | 1 | 5 | – | 4 | – | 1 |
| North Carolina | 3 | – | 3 | – | 0 | 3 | – | 7 | – | 0 |
| NC State | 0 | – | 2 | – | 1 | 4 | – | 5 | – | 1 |
| South Carolina | 1 | – | 5 | – | 0 | 3 | – | 6 | – | 0 |
| Virginia | 0 | – | 4 | – | 0 | 1 | – | 9 | – | 0 |
+ – Conference co-champions; Rankings from AP poll

1955 Big Seven Conference football standings
| | Conf. | | | | | Overall |
| Team | W | | L | | T | W | | L | | T |
|---|---|---|---|---|---|---|---|---|---|---|
| No. 1 Oklahoma $ | 6 | – | 0 | – | 0 | 11 | – | 0 | – | 0 |
| Nebraska | 5 | – | 1 | – | 0 | 5 | – | 5 | – | 0 |
| Colorado | 3 | – | 3 | – | 0 | 6 | – | 4 | – | 0 |
| Kansas State | 3 | – | 3 | – | 0 | 4 | – | 6 | – | 0 |
| Kansas | 1 | – | 4 | – | 1 | 3 | – | 6 | – | 1 |
| Iowa State | 1 | – | 4 | – | 1 | 1 | – | 7 | – | 1 |
| Missouri | 1 | – | 5 | – | 0 | 1 | – | 9 | – | 0 |
$ – Conference champion; Rankings from AP Poll

1955 Big Ten Conference football standings
| | Conf. | | | | | Overall |
| Team | W | | L | | T | W | | L | | T |
|---|---|---|---|---|---|---|---|---|---|---|
| No. 5 Ohio State $ | 6 | – | 0 | – | 0 | 7 | – | 2 | – | 0 |
| No. 2 Michigan State | 5 | – | 1 | – | 0 | 9 | – | 1 | – | 0 |
| No. 12 Michigan | 5 | – | 2 | – | 0 | 7 | – | 2 | – | 0 |
| Purdue | 4 | – | 2 | – | 1 | 5 | – | 3 | – | 1 |
| Illinois | 3 | – | 3 | – | 1 | 5 | – | 3 | – | 1 |
| Wisconsin | 3 | – | 4 | – | 0 | 4 | – | 5 | – | 0 |
| Iowa | 2 | – | 3 | – | 1 | 3 | – | 5 | – | 1 |
| Minnesota | 2 | – | 5 | – | 0 | 3 | – | 6 | – | 0 |
| Indiana | 1 | – | 5 | – | 0 | 3 | – | 6 | – | 0 |
| Northwestern | 0 | – | 6 | – | 1 | 0 | – | 8 | – | 1 |
$ – Conference champion; Rankings from AP Poll

1955 Border Conference football standings
| | Conf. | | | | | Overall |
| Team | W | | L | | T | W | | L | | T |
|---|---|---|---|---|---|---|---|---|---|---|
| Texas Tech $ | 3 | – | 0 | – | 1 | 7 | – | 3 | – | 1 |
| Arizona State | 4 | – | 1 | – | 0 | 8 | – | 2 | – | 1 |
| Hardin–Simmons | 3 | – | 2 | – | 0 | 5 | – | 5 | – | 0 |
| Texas Western | 3 | – | 2 | – | 1 | 6 | – | 2 | – | 2 |
| Arizona | 1 | – | 2 | – | 1 | 5 | – | 4 | – | 1 |
| West Texas State | 1 | – | 4 | – | 1 | 4 | – | 4 | – | 1 |
| New Mexico A&M | 0 | – | 4 | – | 0 | 3 | – | 7 | – | 0 |
$ – Conference champion

1955 Far Western Conference football standings
| | Conf. | | | | | Overall |
| Team | W | | L | | T | W | | L | | T |
|---|---|---|---|---|---|---|---|---|---|---|
| Chico State | 5 | – | 0 | – | 0 | 7 | – | 2 | – | 0 |
| Cal Aggies | 3 | – | 1 | – | 1 | 5 | – | 3 | – | 1 |
| San Francisco State | 3 | – | 2 | – | 0 | 5 | – | 5 | – | 0 |
| Humboldt State | 2 | – | 2 | – | 1 | 7 | – | 3 | – | 1 |
| Nevada | 1 | – | 4 | – | 0 | 2 | – | 5 | – | 0 |
| Sacramento State | 0 | – | 5 | – | 0 | 2 | – | 6 | – | 0 |
No conference champion was named for the 1955 season.

1955 Ivy League football standings
| | Conf. | | | | | Overall |
| Team | W | | L | | T | W | | L | | T |
|---|---|---|---|---|---|---|---|---|---|---|
| Princeton | 6 | – | 1 | – | 0 | 7 | – | 2 | – | 0 |
| Yale | 5 | – | 1 | – | 0 | 7 | – | 2 | – | 0 |
| Dartmouth | 3 | – | 3 | – | 0 | 3 | – | 6 | – | 0 |
| Cornell | 4 | – | 3 | – | 0 | 5 | – | 4 | – | 0 |
| Harvard | 2 | – | 4 | – | 0 | 3 | – | 4 | – | 1 |
| Brown | 2 | – | 4 | – | 0 | 2 | – | 6 | – | 0 |
| Columbia | 1 | – | 5 | – | 0 | 1 | – | 8 | – | 0 |
| Penn | 0 | – | 1 | – | 0 | 0 | – | 8 | – | 0 |
The Ivy League did not crown an official champion until 1956 when full league play began.

1955 Mid-American Conference football standings
| | Conf. | | | | | Overall |
| Team | W | | L | | T | W | | L | | T |
|---|---|---|---|---|---|---|---|---|---|---|
| No. 15 Miami (OH) $ | 5 | – | 0 | – | 0 | 9 | – | 0 | – | 0 |
| Bowling Green | 4 | – | 1 | – | 1 | 7 | – | 1 | – | 1 |
| Kent State | 4 | – | 1 | – | 1 | 6 | – | 2 | – | 1 |
| Ohio | 3 | – | 3 | – | 0 | 5 | – | 4 | – | 0 |
| Toledo | 2 | – | 4 | – | 0 | 3 | – | 5 | – | 1 |
| Marshall | 1 | – | 5 | – | 0 | 3 | – | 6 | – | 0 |
| Western Michigan | 0 | – | 5 | – | 0 | 1 | – | 7 | – | 1 |
$ – Conference champion; Rankings from AP Poll

1955 Middle Three Conference football standings
| | Conf. | | | | | Overall |
| Team | W | | L | | T | W | | L | | T |
|---|---|---|---|---|---|---|---|---|---|---|
| Lafayette $ | 2 | – | 0 | – | 0 | 6 | – | 2 | – | 0 |
| Lehigh | 1 | – | 1 | – | 0 | 4 | – | 5 | – | 0 |
| Rutgers | 0 | – | 2 | – | 0 | 3 | – | 5 | – | 0 |
$ – Conference champion

1955 Pacific Coast Conference football standings
| | Conf. | | | | | Overall |
| Team | W | | L | | T | W | | L | | T |
|---|---|---|---|---|---|---|---|---|---|---|
| No. 4 UCLA $ | 6 | – | 0 | – | 0 | 9 | – | 2 | – | 0 |
| Oregon State | 5 | – | 2 | – | 0 | 6 | – | 3 | – | 0 |
| No. 16 Stanford | 3 | – | 2 | – | 1 | 6 | – | 3 | – | 1 |
| Oregon | 4 | – | 3 | – | 0 | 6 | – | 4 | – | 0 |
| Washington | 4 | – | 3 | – | 1 | 5 | – | 4 | – | 1 |
| No. 13 USC | 3 | – | 3 | – | 0 | 6 | – | 4 | – | 0 |
| California | 1 | – | 5 | – | 1 | 2 | – | 7 | – | 1 |
| Washington State | 1 | – | 5 | – | 1 | 1 | – | 7 | – | 2 |
| Idaho | 0 | – | 4 | – | 0 | 2 | – | 7 | – | 0 |
$ – Conference champion; Rankings from AP Poll

1955 Skyline Conference football standings
| | Conf. | | | | | Overall |
| Team | W | | L | | T | W | | L | | T |
|---|---|---|---|---|---|---|---|---|---|---|
| Colorado A&M $ | 6 | – | 1 | – | 0 | 8 | – | 2 | – | 0 |
| Utah | 4 | – | 1 | – | 0 | 6 | – | 3 | – | 0 |
| Denver | 5 | – | 2 | – | 0 | 8 | – | 2 | – | 0 |
| Wyoming | 5 | – | 2 | – | 0 | 8 | – | 3 | – | 0 |
| Utah State | 3 | – | 4 | – | 0 | 4 | – | 6 | – | 0 |
| Montana | 2 | – | 4 | – | 0 | 3 | – | 7 | – | 0 |
| New Mexico | 1 | – | 5 | – | 0 | 2 | – | 8 | – | 0 |
| BYU | 0 | – | 7 | – | 0 | 1 | – | 9 | – | 0 |
$ – Conference champion

1955 Southeastern Conference football standings
| | Conf. | | | | | Overall |
| Team | W | | L | | T | W | | L | | T |
|---|---|---|---|---|---|---|---|---|---|---|
| No. 10 Ole Miss $ | 5 | – | 1 | – | 0 | 10 | – | 1 | – | 0 |
| No. 8 Auburn | 5 | – | 2 | – | 1 | 8 | – | 2 | – | 1 |
| No. 7 Georgia Tech | 4 | – | 1 | – | 1 | 9 | – | 1 | – | 1 |
| Tennessee | 3 | – | 2 | – | 1 | 6 | – | 3 | – | 1 |
| Vanderbilt | 4 | – | 3 | – | 0 | 8 | – | 3 | – | 0 |
| Mississippi State | 4 | – | 4 | – | 0 | 6 | – | 4 | – | 0 |
| Kentucky | 3 | – | 3 | – | 1 | 6 | – | 3 | – | 1 |
| Tulane | 3 | – | 3 | – | 1 | 5 | – | 4 | – | 1 |
| LSU | 2 | – | 3 | – | 1 | 3 | – | 5 | – | 2 |
| Florida | 3 | – | 5 | – | 0 | 4 | – | 6 | – | 0 |
| Georgia | 2 | – | 5 | – | 0 | 4 | – | 6 | – | 0 |
| Alabama | 0 | – | 7 | – | 0 | 0 | – | 10 | – | 0 |
$ – Conference champion; Rankings from AP Poll

1955 Southern Conference football standings
| | Conf. | | | | | Overall |
| Team | W | | L | | T | W | | L | | T |
|---|---|---|---|---|---|---|---|---|---|---|
| No. 19 West Virginia $ | 4 | – | 0 | – | 0 | 8 | – | 2 | – | 0 |
| VPI | 2 | – | 1 | – | 1 | 6 | – | 3 | – | 1 |
| Davidson | 3 | – | 2 | – | 0 | 5 | – | 4 | – | 0 |
| George Washington | 3 | – | 2 | – | 0 | 5 | – | 4 | – | 0 |
| Richmond | 3 | – | 2 | – | 2 | 4 | – | 3 | – | 2 |
| The Citadel | 2 | – | 2 | – | 0 | 5 | – | 4 | – | 0 |
| Furman | 1 | – | 1 | – | 0 | 1 | – | 9 | – | 0 |
| William & Mary | 1 | – | 3 | – | 1 | 1 | – | 7 | – | 1 |
| VMI | 1 | – | 6 | – | 0 | 1 | – | 9 | – | 0 |
| Washington and Lee | 0 | – | 1 | – | 0 | 0 | – | 7 | – | 0 |
$ – Conference champion; Rankings from AP Poll

1955 Southwest Conference football standings
| | Conf. | | | | | Overall |
| Team | W | | L | | T | W | | L | | T |
|---|---|---|---|---|---|---|---|---|---|---|
| No. 6 TCU $ | 5 | – | 1 | – | 0 | 9 | – | 2 | – | 0 |
| No. 17 Texas A&M | 4 | – | 1 | – | 1 | 7 | – | 2 | – | 1 |
| Texas | 4 | – | 2 | – | 0 | 5 | – | 5 | – | 0 |
| Arkansas | 3 | – | 2 | – | 1 | 5 | – | 4 | – | 1 |
| Baylor | 2 | – | 4 | – | 0 | 5 | – | 5 | – | 0 |
| SMU | 2 | – | 4 | – | 0 | 4 | – | 6 | – | 0 |
| Rice | 0 | – | 6 | – | 0 | 2 | – | 7 | – | 1 |
$ – Conference champion; Rankings from AP Poll

=== Independents ===
1955 Eastern college football independents records
| | Conf. | | | Overall |
| Team | W | L | T | W | | L | | T |
|---|---|---|---|---|---|---|---|---|
| Alfred | | – | | 8 | – | 0 | – | 0 |
| Drexel | | – | | 8 | – | 0 | – | 0 |
| Trinity (CT) | | – | | 7 | – | 0 | – | 0 |
| Juniata | | – | | 8 | – | 0 | – | 1 |
| Carnegie Tech | | – | | 5 | – | 1 | – | 1 |
| Tufts | | – | | 5 | – | 2 | – | 0 |
| Boston College | | – | | 5 | – | 2 | – | 1 |
| No. 20 Army | | – | | 6 | – | 3 | – | 0 |
| Colgate | | – | | 6 | – | 3 | – | 0 |
| No. 11 Pittsburgh | | – | | 7 | – | 4 | – | 0 |
| Holy Cross | | – | | 6 | – | 4 | – | 0 |
| Syracuse | | – | | 5 | – | 3 | – | 0 |
| Penn State | | – | | 5 | – | 4 | – | 0 |
| Buffalo | | – | | 4 | – | 4 | – | 1 |
| Hofstra | | – | | 3 | – | 6 | – | 0 |
| Bucknell | | – | | 2 | – | 6 | – | 1 |
| Boston University | | – | | 2 | – | 6 | – | 0 |
| Franklin & Marshall | | – | | 2 | – | 6 | – | 0 |
| Villanova | | – | | 1 | – | 9 | – | 0 |
| Temple | | – | | 0 | – | 8 | – | 0 |
Rankings from AP Poll

1955 Midwestern college football independents records
| | Conf. | | | Overall |
| Team | W | L | T | W | | L | | T |
|---|---|---|---|---|---|---|---|---|
| Ferris Institute | | – | | 6 | – | 1 | – | 0 |
| No. 9 Notre Dame | | – | | 8 | – | 2 | – | 0 |
| Xavier | | – | | 7 | – | 2 | – | 0 |
| Carthage | | – | | 6 | – | 2 | – | 0 |
| Wabash | | – | | 5 | – | 3 | – | 1 |
| Michigan Tech | | – | | 4 | – | 3 | – | 0 |
| Washington University | | – | | 5 | – | 4 | – | 0 |
| Drake | | – | | 4 | – | 4 | – | 0 |
| Youngstown | | – | | 4 | – | 5 | – | 0 |
| Dayton | | – | | 3 | – | 6 | – | 0 |
| Marquette | | – | | 2 | – | 6 | – | 1 |
| Baldwin–Wallace | | – | | 2 | – | 6 | – | 0 |
| Cincinnati | | – | | 1 | – | 6 | – | 2 |
| Rose Poly | | – | | 1 | – | 6 | – | 1 |
| Northern Michigan | | – | | 0 | – | 7 | – | 0 |
Rankings from AP Poll

1955 Southern college football independents records
| | Conf. | | | Overall |
| Team | W | L | T | W | | L | | T |
|---|---|---|---|---|---|---|---|---|
| Centre | | – | | 8 | – | 0 | – | 0 |
| Mississippi Southern | | – | | 9 | – | 1 | – | 0 |
| Delaware | | – | | 8 | – | 1 | – | 0 |
| Louisville | | – | | 7 | – | 2 | – | 0 |
| Tampa | | – | | 7 | – | 2 | – | 0 |
| No. 18 Navy | | – | | 6 | – | 2 | – | 1 |
| Arkansas State | | – | | 6 | – | 3 | – | 0 |
| No. 14 Miami (FL) | | – | | 6 | – | 3 | – | 0 |
| Chattanooga | | – | | 5 | – | 4 | – | 1 |
| Florida State | | – | | 5 | – | 5 | – | 0 |
| Memphis State | | – | | 2 | – | 7 | – | 0 |
| Howard (AL) | | – | | 1 | – | 8 | – | 0 |
| Sewanee | | – | | 1 | – | 8 | – | 0 |
Rankings from AP Poll

1955 Western college football independents records
| | Conf. | | | Overall |
| Team | W | L | T | W | | L | | T |
|---|---|---|---|---|---|---|---|---|
| Long Beach State | | – | | 5 | – | 2 | – | 0 |
| Hawaii | | – | | 7 | – | 4 | – | 0 |
| San Jose State | | – | | 5 | – | 3 | – | 1 |
| Cal Poly San Dimas | | – | | 4 | – | 3 | – | 0 |
| La Verne | | – | | 5 | – | 4 | – | 0 |
| Pacific (CA) | | – | | 5 | – | 4 | – | 0 |
| Air Force | | – | | 4 | – | 4 | – | 0 |
| Pepperdine | | – | | 5 | – | 5 | – | 0 |
| Los Angeles State | | – | | 3 | – | 6 | – | 0 |
| Santa Barbara | | – | | 3 | – | 6 | – | 0 |
| UC Riverside | | – | | 1 | – | 3 | – | 1 |

=== Minor conferences ===
| Conference | Champion(s) | Record |
|---|---|---|
| California Collegiate Athletic Association | No champion | — |
| Central Church College Conference | Concordia (NE) | 3–0 |
| Central Intercollegiate Athletics Association | Maryland State | 7–0 |
| Central Intercollegiate Athletic Conference | Pittsburg State | 5–0 |
| College Conference of Illinois | Wheaton (IL) | 5–0–1 |
| Evergreen Conference | Whitworth | 6–0 |
| Far Western Conference | Chico State College | 5–0 |
| Frontier Conference (Montana and Idaho) | Rocky Mountain | 4–0 |
| Gulf Coast Conference | Abilene Christian; North Texas State | 2–1 |
| Frontier Conference (New Mexico) | Adams State College; New Mexico Military Institute | 4–1 |
| Indiana Collegiate Conference | St. Joseph's; Evansville | 5–1 |
| Iowa Intercollegiate Athletic Conference | Parsons | 6–0 |
| Kansas Collegiate Athletic Conference | College of Emporia | 7–0 |
| Lone Star Conference | East Texas State Teachers; Sam Houston State Teachers; Southwest Texas State Teachers | 5–1 |
| Michigan Intercollegiate Athletic Association | Hillsdale | 6–0 |
| Midwest Collegiate Athletic Conference | Coe | 7–0 |
| Minnesota Intercollegiate Athletic Conference | Gustavus Adolphus | 5–1 |
| Missouri Intercollegiate Athletic Association | Southeast Missouri State | 5–0 |
| Nebraska College Conference | Nebraska State Teachers (UN–Kearney) | 7–0 |
| North Central Intercollegiate Athletic Conference | South Dakota State College | 5–0–1 |
| North Dakota College Athletic Conference | Jamestown College; Dickinson State College | 5–1 |
| Ohio Athletic Conference | Muskingum | 7–0 |
| Ohio Valley Conference | Tennessee Tech | 5–0 |
| Oklahoma Collegiate Athletic Conference | Central State College (OK); Northeastern State Teachers (OK); Southwestern State College (OK) | 4–1 |
| Oregon Collegiate Conference | Unknown | — |
| Pacific Northwest Conference | College of Idaho; Lewis & Clark | 4–1 |
| Pennsylvania State Athletic Conference | Bloomsburg State Teachers | 3–0–1 |
| Presidents' Athletic Conference | Western Reserve | 3–0 |
| Rocky Mountain Athletic Conference | Idaho State College | 6–0 |
| Southern California Intercollegiate Athletic Conference | Pomona-Claremont | 4–0 |
| South Dakota Intercollegiate Conference | Northern State Teachers | 7–0 |
| Southern Intercollegiate Athletic Conference | Florida A&M | 6–0 |
| Southwestern Athletic Conference | Southern | 6–1 |
| State Teacher's College Conference of Minnesota | St. Cloud State Teachers | 4–0 |
| Texas Collegiate Athletic Conference | McMurry | 2–0 |
| Wisconsin State College Conference | Wisconsin State–Stevens Point | 6–0 |

=== Minor conference standings ===
1955 Badger-Illini Conference football standings
| | Conf. | | | | | Overall |
| Team | W | | L | | T | W | | L | | T |
|---|---|---|---|---|---|---|---|---|---|---|
| Mission House + | 5 | – | 1 | – | 0 | 6 | – | 1 | – | 0 |
| Northwestern (WI) + | 5 | – | 1 | – | 0 | 6 | – | 1 | – | 0 |
| Milton | 3 | – | 3 | – | 0 | 3 | – | 3 | – | 0 |
| Wisconsin Tech | 3 | – | 3 | – | 0 | 3 | – | 4 | – | 0 |
| Wisconsin–Extension | 2 | – | 4 | – | 0 | 3 | – | 4 | – | 0 |
| St. Procopius | 1 | – | 4 | – | 1 | 1 | – | 4 | – | 1 |
| Concordia (IL) | 1 | – | 4 | – | 1 | 1 | – | 5 | – | 1 |
+ – Conference co-champions

1955 California Collegiate Athletic Association football standings
| | Conf. | | | | | Overall |
| Team | W | | L | | T | W | | L | | T |
|---|---|---|---|---|---|---|---|---|---|---|
| Fresno State $ | 2 | – | 0 | – | 0 | 9 | – | 1 | – | 0 |
| Cal Poly | 1 | – | 1 | – | 0 | 7 | – | 3 | – | 0 |
| San Diego State | 0 | – | 2 | – | 0 | 2 | – | 8 | – | 0 |
$ – Conference champion

1955 Central Church College Conference football standings
| | Conf. | | | | | Overall |
| Team | W | | L | | T | W | | L | | T |
|---|---|---|---|---|---|---|---|---|---|---|
| Concordia (NE) $ | 3 | – | 0 | – | 0 | 6 | – | 2 | – | 0 |
| Tarkio | 2 | – | 1 | – | 0 | 5 | – | 3 | – | 0 |
| Westmar | 1 | – | 2 | – | 0 | 1 | – | 7 | – | 0 |
| Dana | 0 | – | 3 | – | 0 | 1 | – | 6 | – | 0 |
$ – Conference champion

1955 Central Intercollegiate Conference football standings
| | Conf. | | | | | Overall |
| Team | W | | L | | T | W | | L | | T |
|---|---|---|---|---|---|---|---|---|---|---|
| Pittsburg State $ | 5 | – | 0 | – | 0 | 7 | – | 3 | – | 0 |
| Washburn | 4 | – | 1 | – | 0 | 6 | – | 2 | – | 1 |
| Fort Hays State | 2 | – | 2 | – | 1 | 5 | – | 3 | – | 1 |
| St. Benedict's | 2 | – | 3 | – | 0 | 3 | – | 6 | – | 0 |
| Southwestern (KS) | 1 | – | 3 | – | 1 | 4 | – | 4 | – | 1 |
| Emporia State | 0 | – | 5 | – | 0 | 0 | – | 10 | – | 0 |
$ – Conference champion

1955 Central Intercollegiate Athletic Association football standings
| | Conf. | | | | | Overall |
| Team | W | | L | | T | W | | L | | T |
|---|---|---|---|---|---|---|---|---|---|---|
| No. 2 Maryland State $ | 7 | – | 0 | – | 0 | 9 | – | 0 | – | 0 |
| No. 7 North Carolina A&T | 4 | – | 1 | – | 2 | 4 | – | 1 | – | 3 |
| No. 14 Virginia State | 4 | – | 1 | – | 3 | 4 | – | 2 | – | 3 |
| No. 9 North Carolina College | 3 | – | 1 | – | 2 | 4 | – | 1 | – | 2 |
| No. 13 Morgan State | 5 | – | 1 | – | 0 | 6 | – | 2 | – | 0 |
| Winston-Salem State | 5 | – | 1 | – | 0 | 6 | – | 2 | – | 0 |
| Shaw | 4 | – | 2 | – | 2 | 4 | – | 3 | – | 2 |
| No. 12 Delaware State | 5 | – | 1 | – | 0 | 7 | – | 1 | – | 0 |
| Bluefield State | 5 | – | 2 | – | 1 | 7 | – | 2 | – | 1 |
| St. Augustine's | 3 | – | 5 | – | 0 | 4 | – | 5 | – | 0 |
| Hampton | 4 | – | 6 | – | 0 | 4 | – | 6 | – | 0 |
| Howard | 2 | – | 4 | – | 0 | 3 | – | 6 | – | 0 |
| Johnson C. Smith | 2 | – | 4 | – | 0 | 3 | – | 4 | – | 0 |
| Virginia Union | 3 | – | 5 | – | 0 | 4 | – | 5 | – | 0 |
| Saint Paul's (VA) | 1 | – | 5 | – | 0 | 2 | – | 6 | – | 0 |
| Lincoln (PA) | 1 | – | 6 | – | 0 | 1 | – | 7 | – | 0 |
| West Virginia State | 0 | – | 6 | – | 0 | 1 | – | 7 | – | 0 |
| Fayetteville State | 0 | – | 8 | – | 0 | 0 | – | 9 | – | 0 |
$ – Conference champion; Conference standings were based on the Dickinson System.; Rankings from the Pittsburgh Courier.

1955 College Conference of Illinois football standings
| | Conf. | | | | | Overall |
| Team | W | | L | | T | W | | L | | T |
|---|---|---|---|---|---|---|---|---|---|---|
| Wheaton (IL) $ | 5 | – | 0 | – | 1 | 6 | – | 1 | – | 1 |
| Illinois Wesleyan | 5 | – | 1 | – | 0 | 6 | – | 3 | – | 0 |
| Millikin | 4 | – | 2 | – | 0 | 4 | – | 4 | – | 0 |
| Lake Forest | 3 | – | 2 | – | 1 | 3 | – | 3 | – | 2 |
| Augustana (IL) | 2 | – | 4 | – | 0 | 2 | – | 6 | – | 0 |
| North Central (IL) | 1 | – | 4 | – | 0 | 2 | – | 6 | – | 0 |
| Elmhurst | 0 | – | 6 | – | 0 | 0 | – | 8 | – | 0 |
$ – Conference champion

1955 Eastern Intercollegiate Athletic Conference football standings
| | Conf. | | | | | Overall |
| Team | W | | L | | T | W | | L | | T |
|---|---|---|---|---|---|---|---|---|---|---|
| South Carolina Trade $ | 3 | – | 1 | – | 0 | ? | – | ? | – | 0 |
| Norfolk State | 3 | – | 2 | – | 0 | 3 | – | 5 | – | 0 |
| Voorhees | 2 | – | 2 | – | 0 | ? | – | ? | – | ? |
| Livingstone | 1 | – | 4 | – | 0 | 2 | – | 6 | – | 0 |
| Morristown | 1 | – | 4 | – | 0 | ? | – | ? | – | ? |
| Elizabeth City State | 3 | – | 0 | – | 0 | 7 | – | 2 | – | 0 |
$ – Conference champion; Elizabeth City State was ineligible for the conference title.

1955 Evergreen Conference football standings
| | Conf. | | | | | Overall |
| Team | W | | L | | T | W | | L | | T |
|---|---|---|---|---|---|---|---|---|---|---|
| Whitworth $ | 6 | – | 0 | – | 0 | 9 | – | 0 | – | 0 |
| Pacific Lutheran | 5 | – | 1 | – | 0 | 5 | – | 3 | – | 0 |
| Puget Sound | 4 | – | 2 | – | 0 | 6 | – | 2 | – | 0 |
| Eastern Washington | 3 | – | 3 | – | 0 | 4 | – | 4 | – | 0 |
| Central Washington | 2 | – | 4 | – | 0 | 2 | – | 6 | – | 0 |
| UBC | 1 | – | 5 | – | 0 | ? | – | ? | – | ? |
| Western Washington | 0 | – | 6 | – | 0 | 1 | – | 7 | – | 0 |
$ – Conference champion

1955 Gulf Coast Conference football standings
| | Conf. | | | | | Overall |
| Team | W | | L | | T | W | | L | | T |
|---|---|---|---|---|---|---|---|---|---|---|
| North Texas State + | 2 | – | 1 | – | 0 | 5 | – | 4 | – | 1 |
| Abilene Christian + | 2 | – | 1 | – | 0 | 3 | – | 5 | – | 2 |
| Trinity (TX) | 1 | – | 2 | – | 0 | 5 | – | 4 | – | 0 |
| Midwestern (TX) | 0 | – | 3 | – | 0 | 2 | – | 8 | – | 0 |
+ – Conference co-champions; North Texas State's loss to Chattanooga and Abilene Christian's loss to Mississippi Southern counted in the conference standings.

1955 Gulf States Conference football standings
| | Conf. | | | | | Overall |
| Team | W | | L | | T | W | | L | | T |
|---|---|---|---|---|---|---|---|---|---|---|
| Louisiana Tech $ | 6 | – | 0 | – | 0 | 9 | – | 1 | – | 0 |
| McNeese State | 5 | – | 1 | – | 0 | 7 | – | 1 | – | 1 |
| Southeastern Louisiana | 4 | – | 2 | – | 0 | 5 | – | 5 | – | 0 |
| Southwestern Louisiana | 3 | – | 3 | – | 0 | 5 | – | 4 | – | 0 |
| Northwestern State | 2 | – | 4 | – | 0 | 4 | – | 5 | – | 0 |
| Northeast Louisiana State | 1 | – | 5 | – | 0 | 4 | – | 6 | – | 0 |
| Louisiana College | 0 | – | 6 | – | 0 | 2 | – | 8 | – | 0 |
$ – Conference champion

1955 Hoosier Conference football standings
| | Conf. | | | | | Overall |
| Team | W | | L | | T | W | | L | | T |
|---|---|---|---|---|---|---|---|---|---|---|
| Indiana Central $ | 4 | – | 1 | – | 1 | 5 | – | 3 | – | 1 |
| Franklin (IN) | 4 | – | 2 | – | 0 | 6 | – | 3 | – | 0 |
| Hanover | 4 | – | 2 | – | 0 | 5 | – | 4 | – | 0 |
| Anderson (IN) | 3 | – | 3 | – | 0 | 4 | – | 5 | – | 0 |
| Earlham | 3 | – | 3 | – | 0 | 3 | – | 6 | – | 0 |
| Manchester (IN) | 1 | – | 4 | – | 1 | 2 | – | 6 | – | 1 |
| Taylor | 1 | – | 5 | – | 0 | 2 | – | 6 | – | 0 |
$ – Conference champion

1955 Indiana Collegiate Conference football standings
| | Conf. | | | | | Overall |
| Team | W | | L | | T | W | | L | | T |
|---|---|---|---|---|---|---|---|---|---|---|
| Evansville + | 5 | – | 1 | – | 0 | 6 | – | 3 | – | 0 |
| Saint Joseph's (IN) + | 5 | – | 1 | – | 0 | 6 | – | 3 | – | 0 |
| Valparaiso | 4 | – | 2 | – | 0 | 5 | – | 4 | – | 0 |
| Butler | 3 | – | 3 | – | 0 | 3 | – | 5 | – | 0 |
| DePauw | 2 | – | 4 | – | 0 | 5 | – | 4 | – | 0 |
| Ball State | 1 | – | 5 | – | 0 | 3 | – | 5 | – | 0 |
| Indiana State | 1 | – | 5 | – | 0 | 2 | – | 6 | – | 0 |
+ – Conference co-champions

1955 Interstate Intercollegiate Athletic Conference football standings
| | Conf. | | | | | Overall |
| Team | W | | L | | T | W | | L | | T |
|---|---|---|---|---|---|---|---|---|---|---|
| Central Michigan + | 5 | – | 1 | – | 0 | 8 | – | 1 | – | 0 |
| Michigan State Normal + | 5 | – | 1 | – | 0 | 7 | – | 2 | – | 0 |
| Southern Illinois | 4 | – | 1 | – | 1 | 4 | – | 4 | – | 2 |
| Western Illinois | 2 | – | 3 | – | 1 | 5 | – | 4 | – | 1 |
| Illinois State Normal | 2 | – | 3 | – | 1 | 3 | – | 4 | – | 2 |
| Eastern Illinois | 1 | – | 5 | – | 0 | 3 | – | 6 | – | 0 |
| Northern Illinois State | 0 | – | 5 | – | 1 | 0 | – | 8 | – | 1 |
+ – Conference co-champions

1955 Iowa Conference football standings
| | Conf. | | | | | Overall |
| Team | W | | L | | T | W | | L | | T |
|---|---|---|---|---|---|---|---|---|---|---|
| Parsons $ | 6 | – | 0 | – | 0 | 8 | – | 0 | – | 0 |
| Luther | 5 | – | 0 | – | 1 | 9 | – | 0 | – | 1 |
| Simpson (IA) | 5 | – | 2 | – | 0 | 6 | – | 2 | – | 0 |
| Buena Vista | 3 | – | 2 | – | 1 | 5 | – | 3 | – | 1 |
| Iowa Wesleyan | 2 | – | 3 | – | 1 | 2 | – | 5 | – | 1 |
| Dubuque | 2 | – | 4 | – | 0 | 2 | – | 5 | – | 0 |
| Upper Iowa | 1 | – | 5 | – | 1 | 2 | – | 5 | – | 1 |
| Central (IA) | 1 | – | 5 | – | 0 | 3 | – | 5 | – | 0 |
| Wartburg | 1 | – | 5 | – | 0 | 2 | – | 6 | – | 0 |
$ – Conference champion

1955 Kansas Collegiate Athletic Conference football standings
| | Conf. | | | | | Overall |
| Team | W | | L | | T | W | | L | | T |
|---|---|---|---|---|---|---|---|---|---|---|
| College of Emporia $ | 7 | – | 0 | – | 0 | 9 | – | 0 | – | 0 |
| Kansas Wesleyan | 5 | – | 2 | – | 0 | 6 | – | 3 | – | 0 |
| McPherson | 5 | – | 2 | – | 0 | 5 | – | 3 | – | 0 |
| Baker | 4 | – | 3 | – | 0 | 4 | – | 5 | – | 0 |
| Bethel (KS) | 4 | – | 3 | – | 0 | 4 | – | 5 | – | 0 |
| Ottawa | 2 | – | 5 | – | 0 | 3 | – | 6 | – | 0 |
| Bethany (KS) | 1 | – | 6 | – | 0 | 1 | – | 8 | – | 0 |
| Friends | 0 | – | 7 | – | 0 | 0 | – | 8 | – | 0 |
$ – Conference champion

1955 Lone Star Conference football standings
| | Conf. | | | | | Overall |
| Team | W | | L | | T | W | | L | | T |
|---|---|---|---|---|---|---|---|---|---|---|
| Sam Houston State + | 5 | – | 1 | – | 0 | 6 | – | 1 | – | 2 |
| Southwest Texas State + | 5 | – | 1 | – | 0 | 6 | – | 1 | – | 2 |
| East Texas State + | 5 | – | 1 | – | 0 | 5 | – | 4 | – | 1 |
| Stephen F. Austin | 2 | – | 4 | – | 0 | 5 | – | 4 | – | 0 |
| Lamar Tech | 2 | – | 4 | – | 0 | 4 | – | 6 | – | 0 |
| Texas A&I | 2 | – | 4 | – | 0 | 4 | – | 6 | – | 0 |
| Sul Ross | 0 | – | 6 | – | 0 | 2 | – | 8 | – | 0 |
+ – Conference co-champions

1955 Mason–Dixon Conference football standings
| | Conf. | | | | | Overall |
| Team | W | | L | | T | W | | L | | T |
|---|---|---|---|---|---|---|---|---|---|---|
| Randolph–Macon $ | 4 | – | 0 | – | 0 | 6 | – | 2 | – | 1 |
| Hampden–Sydney | 3 | – | 1 | – | 0 | 8 | – | 1 | – | 0 |
| Bridgewater | 1 | – | 2 | – | 0 | 2 | – | 5 | – | 0 |
| Gallaudet | 0 | – | 1 | – | 0 | 1 | – | 4 | – | 0 |
| Johns Hopkins | 0 | – | 2 | – | 0 | 2 | – | 6 | – | 0 |
| Western Maryland | 0 | – | 2 | – | 0 | 2 | – | 6 | – | 0 |
$ – Conference champion

1955 Michigan Intercollegiate Athletic Association football standings
| | Conf. | | | | | Overall |
| Team | W | | L | | T | W | | L | | T |
|---|---|---|---|---|---|---|---|---|---|---|
| Hillsdale $ | 6 | – | 0 | – | 0 | 9 | – | 0 | – | 0 |
| Kalamazoo | 4 | – | 2 | – | 0 | 5 | – | 3 | – | 0 |
| Alma | 3 | – | 3 | – | 0 | 5 | – | 4 | – | 0 |
| Hope | 3 | – | 3 | – | 0 | 4 | – | 5 | – | 0 |
| Albion | 3 | – | 3 | – | 0 | 3 | – | 5 | – | 0 |
| Adrian | 2 | – | 4 | – | 0 | 4 | – | 5 | – | 0 |
| Olivet | 0 | – | 6 | – | 0 | 1 | – | 8 | – | 0 |
$ – Conference champion

1955 Mid-Ohio League football standings
| | Conf. | | | | | Overall |
| Team | W | | L | | T | W | | L | | T |
|---|---|---|---|---|---|---|---|---|---|---|
| Ashland $ | 5 | – | 0 | – | 0 | 7 | – | 2 | – | 0 |
| Findlay | 4 | – | 1 | – | 0 | 6 | – | 2 | – | 0 |
| Wilmington (OH) | 2 | – | 2 | – | 1 | 5 | – | 3 | – | 1 |
| Bluffton | 2 | – | 3 | – | 0 | 3 | – | 6 | – | 0 |
| Defiance | 1 | – | 3 | – | 1 | 1 | – | 7 | – | 1 |
| Ohio Northern | 0 | – | 5 | – | 0 | 1 | – | 6 | – | 0 |
$ – Conference champion

1955 Midwest Athletic Association football standings
| | Conf. | | | | | Overall |
| Team | W | | L | | T | W | | L | | T |
|---|---|---|---|---|---|---|---|---|---|---|
| No. 1 Grambling $ | 2 | – | 0 | – | 0 | 10 | – | 0 | – | 0 |
| No. 6 Tennessee A&I | 3 | – | 1 | – | 0 | 7 | – | 2 | – | 0 |
| No. 10 Lincoln (MO) | 3 | – | 1 | – | 0 | 5 | – | 3 | – | 0 |
| No. 11 Kentucky State | 2 | – | 2 | – | 0 | 7 | – | 2 | – | 0 |
| Jackson | 0 | – | 3 | – | 0 | 5 | – | 4 | – | 0 |
| Central State (OH) | 0 | – | 3 | – | 0 | 4 | – | 4 | – | 0 |
$ – Conference champion; Rankings from Associated Negro Press

1955 Midwest Conference football standings
| | Conf. | | | | | Overall |
| Team | W | | L | | T | W | | L | | T |
|---|---|---|---|---|---|---|---|---|---|---|
| Coe $ | 7 | – | 0 | – | 0 | 8 | – | 0 | – | 0 |
| St. Olaf | 6 | – | 1 | – | 0 | 7 | – | 1 | – | 0 |
| Carleton | 5 | – | 2 | – | 0 | 5 | – | 3 | – | 0 |
| Cornell (IA) | 4 | – | 3 | – | 0 | 5 | – | 3 | – | 0 |
| Grinnell | 3 | – | 4 | – | 0 | 4 | – | 4 | – | 0 |
| Ripon | 2 | – | 5 | – | 0 | 2 | – | 5 | – | 1 |
| Knox | 1 | – | 6 | – | 0 | 2 | – | 6 | – | 0 |
| Monmouth (IL) | 0 | – | 7 | – | 0 | 0 | – | 7 | – | 0 |
| Lawrence | | | – | | | 1 | – | 3 | – | 1 |
$ – Conference champion; Lawrence's first three game were cancelled because of a polio epidemic; games against Lawrence were not counted in the conference standings.

1955 Minnesota Intercollegiate Athletic Conference football standings
| | Conf. | | | | | Overall |
| Team | W | | L | | T | W | | L | | T |
|---|---|---|---|---|---|---|---|---|---|---|
| Gustavus Adolphus $ | 5 | – | 1 | – | 0 | 5 | – | 3 | – | 0 |
| Saint John's (MN) | 4 | – | 2 | – | 0 | 7 | – | 2 | – | 0 |
| Concordia (MN) | 4 | – | 2 | – | 0 | 6 | – | 2 | – | 0 |
| Macalester | 4 | – | 2 | – | 0 | 4 | – | 3 | – | 1 |
| Augsburg | 3 | – | 3 | – | 0 | 4 | – | 4 | – | 0 |
| St. Thomas (MN) | 3 | – | 3 | – | 0 | 4 | – | 4 | – | 0 |
| Minnesota–Duluth | 1 | – | 5 | – | 0 | 3 | – | 5 | – | 0 |
| Hamline | 0 | – | 6 | – | 0 | 0 | – | 7 | – | 0 |
$ – Conference champion

1955 Minnesota Teachers College Conference football standings
| | Conf. | | | | | Overall |
| Team | W | | L | | T | W | | L | | T |
|---|---|---|---|---|---|---|---|---|---|---|
| St. Cloud State $ | 4 | – | 0 | – | 0 | 8 | – | 1 | – | 0 |
| Mankato State | 3 | – | 1 | – | 0 | 4 | – | 5 | – | 0 |
| Bemidji State | 1 | – | 3 | – | 0 | 4 | – | 3 | – | 1 |
| Moorhead State | 1 | – | 3 | – | 0 | 3 | – | 6 | – | 0 |
| Winona State | 1 | – | 3 | – | 0 | 2 | – | 6 | – | 0 |
$ – Conference champion

1955 Missouri College Athletic Union football standings
| | Conf. | | | | | Overall |
| Team | W | | L | | T | W | | L | | T |
|---|---|---|---|---|---|---|---|---|---|---|
| Missouri Valley $ | 1 | – | 0 | – | 0 | 9 | – | 1 | – | 1 |
| Tarkio | 2 | – | 1 | – | 0 | 5 | – | 3 | – | 0 |
| William Jewell | 2 | – | 1 | – | 0 | 5 | – | 4 | – | 0 |
| Culver–Stockton | 1 | – | 1 | – | 0 | 2 | – | 4 | – | 3 |
| Central (MO) | 0 | – | 3 | – | 0 | 1 | – | 6 | – | 1 |
$ – Conference champion

1955 Missouri Intercollegiate Athletic Association football standings
| | Conf. | | | | | Overall |
| Team | W | | L | | T | W | | L | | T |
|---|---|---|---|---|---|---|---|---|---|---|
| SE Missouri State $ | 5 | – | 0 | – | 0 | 9 | – | 0 | – | 0 |
| Central Missouri State | 4 | – | 1 | – | 0 | 5 | – | 4 | – | 0 |
| Missouri–Rolla | 2 | – | 3 | – | 0 | 4 | – | 5 | – | 0 |
| NW Missouri State | 2 | – | 3 | – | 0 | 2 | – | 5 | – | 1 |
| NE Missouri State | 1 | – | 4 | – | 0 | 3 | – | 5 | – | 0 |
| SW Missouri State | 1 | – | 4 | – | 0 | 2 | – | 6 | – | 1 |
$ – Conference champion

1955 Missouri Valley Conference football standings
| | Conf. | | | | | Overall |
| Team | W | | L | | T | W | | L | | T |
|---|---|---|---|---|---|---|---|---|---|---|
| Wichita + | 3 | – | 1 | – | 0 | 7 | – | 2 | – | 1 |
| Detroit + | 3 | – | 1 | – | 0 | 5 | – | 3 | – | 1 |
| Houston | 2 | – | 2 | – | 0 | 6 | – | 4 | – | 0 |
| Tulsa | 1 | – | 3 | – | 0 | 2 | – | 7 | – | 1 |
| Oklahoma A&M | 1 | – | 3 | – | 0 | 2 | – | 8 | – | 0 |
+ – Conference co-champions

1955 Montana Collegiate Conference football standings
| | Conf. | | | | | Overall |
| Team | W | | L | | T | W | | L | | T |
|---|---|---|---|---|---|---|---|---|---|---|
| Rocky Mountain $ | 4 | – | 0 | – | 0 | ? | – | ? | – | ? |
| Carroll (MT) | 3 | – | 1 | – | 0 | 4 | – | 4 | – | 0 |
| Eastern Montana | 2 | – | 2 | – | 0 | 2 | – | 3 | – | 0 |
| Western Montana | 1 | – | 3 | – | 0 | ? | – | ? | – | ? |
| Montana Mines | 0 | – | 4 | – | 0 | ? | – | ? | – | ? |
$ – Conference champion

1955 Nebraska College Conference football standings
| | Conf. | | | | | Overall |
| Team | W | | L | | T | W | | L | | T |
|---|---|---|---|---|---|---|---|---|---|---|
| Kearney State $ | 6 | – | 1 | – | 0 | 8 | – | 2 | – | 0 |
| Hastings | 5 | – | 1 | – | 1 | 5 | – | 4 | – | 1 |
| Peru State | 5 | – | 2 | – | 0 | 7 | – | 2 | – | 0 |
| Wayne State (NE) | 4 | – | 3 | – | 0 | 4 | – | 4 | – | 1 |
| Doane | 3 | – | 4 | – | 0 | 3 | – | 4 | – | 1 |
| Nebraska Wesleyan | 2 | – | 4 | – | 1 | 2 | – | 7 | – | 1 |
| Chadron State | 2 | – | 5 | – | 0 | 3 | – | 5 | – | 0 |
| Midland | 0 | – | 7 | – | 0 | 0 | – | 8 | – | 0 |
$ – Conference champion

1955 North Central Conference football standings
| | Conf. | | | | | Overall |
| Team | W | | L | | T | W | | L | | T |
|---|---|---|---|---|---|---|---|---|---|---|
| South Dakota State $ | 5 | – | 0 | – | 1 | 6 | – | 2 | – | 1 |
| Iowa State Teachers | 5 | – | 1 | – | 0 | 8 | – | 1 | – | 0 |
| Morningside | 3 | – | 2 | – | 1 | 4 | – | 3 | – | 1 |
| North Dakota | 3 | – | 3 | – | 0 | 6 | – | 3 | – | 0 |
| South Dakota | 3 | – | 3 | – | 0 | 4 | – | 4 | – | 0 |
| Augustana (SD) | 1 | – | 5 | – | 0 | 2 | – | 6 | – | 1 |
| North Dakota State | 0 | – | 6 | – | 0 | 0 | – | 9 | – | 0 |
$ – Conference champion

1955 North Dakota Intercollegiate Conference football standings
| | Conf. | | | | | Overall |
| Team | W | | L | | T | W | | L | | T |
|---|---|---|---|---|---|---|---|---|---|---|
| Jamestown + | 5 | – | 1 | – | 0 | 6 | – | 1 | – | 0 |
| Dickinson State + | 5 | – | 1 | – | 0 | 5 | – | 1 | – | 0 |
| Wahpeton Science | 4 | – | 2 | – | 0 | 4 | – | 2 | – | 0 |
| Minot State | 4 | – | 2 | – | 0 | 4 | – | 2 | – | 0 |
| Mayville State | 3 | – | 3 | – | 0 | 3 | – | 3 | – | 0 |
| Ellendale | 2 | – | 3 | – | 1 | 2 | – | 3 | – | 1 |
| Bottineau | 1 | – | 4 | – | 1 | 1 | – | 4 | – | 1 |
| Valley City State | 1 | – | 5 | – | 0 | 1 | – | 5 | – | 0 |
| Bismarck JC | 1 | – | 5 | – | 0 | 1 | – | 5 | – | 0 |
+ – Conference co-champions

1955 North State Conference football standings
| | Conf. | | | | | Overall |
| Team | W | | L | | T | W | | L | | T |
|---|---|---|---|---|---|---|---|---|---|---|
| Lenoir Rhyne $ | 6 | – | 0 | – | 0 | 10 | – | 0 | – | 0 |
| Catawba * | 4 | – | 2 | – | 0 | 6 | – | 4 | – | 0 |
| East Carolina | 3 | – | 2 | – | 0 | 4 | – | 5 | – | 0 |
| Appalachian State | 3 | – | 3 | – | 0 | 3 | – | 6 | – | 0 |
| Elon | 2 | – | 4 | – | 0 | 3 | – | 7 | – | 0 |
| Western Carolina * | 1 | – | 4 | – | 0 | 1 | – | 8 | – | 1 |
| Guilford | 0 | – | 4 | – | 0 | 0 | – | 7 | – | 1 |
$ – Conference champion; * – Western Carolina forfeited a win over Catawba.

1955 Northwest Conference football standings
| | Conf. | | | | | Overall |
| Team | W | | L | | T | W | | L | | T |
|---|---|---|---|---|---|---|---|---|---|---|
| Lewis & Clark + | 4 | – | 1 | – | 0 | 6 | – | 2 | – | 0 |
| College of Idaho + | 4 | – | 1 | – | 0 | 6 | – | 4 | – | 0 |
| Pacific (OR) | 2 | – | 3 | – | 0 | 4 | – | 4 | – | 0 |
| Whitman | 2 | – | 3 | – | 0 | 4 | – | 4 | – | 0 |
| Linfield | 2 | – | 3 | – | 0 | 3 | – | 6 | – | 0 |
| Willamette | 1 | – | 4 | – | 0 | 1 | – | 7 | – | 0 |
+ – Conference co-champions

1955 New Mexico Conference football standings
| | Conf. | | | | | Overall |
| Team | W | | L | | T | W | | L | | T |
|---|---|---|---|---|---|---|---|---|---|---|
| New Mexico Military + | 4 | – | 1 | – | 0 | 5 | – | 3 | – | 0 |
| Adams State + | 4 | – | 1 | – | 0 | 6 | – | 4 | – | 0 |
| Panhandle A&M | 3 | – | 2 | – | 0 | 5 | – | 4 | – | 0 |
| New Mexico Highlands | 3 | – | 2 | – | 0 | 5 | – | 2 | – | 1 |
| New Mexico Western | 1 | – | 4 | – | 0 | 3 | – | 6 | – | 0 |
| Arizona State–Flagstaff | 0 | – | 5 | – | 0 | 0 | – | 9 | – | 0 |
+ – Conference co-champions

1955 Ohio Athletic Conference football standings
| | Conf. | | | | | Overall |
| Team | W | | L | | T | W | | L | | T |
|---|---|---|---|---|---|---|---|---|---|---|
| Muskingum $ | 7 | – | 0 | – | 0 | 8 | – | 0 | – | 0 |
| Heidelberg | 5 | – | 0 | – | 0 | 9 | – | 0 | – | 0 |
| Akron | 6 | – | 2 | – | 0 | 6 | – | 2 | – | 0 |
| Wooster | 5 | – | 2 | – | 0 | 7 | – | 2 | – | 0 |
| Hiram | 3 | – | 2 | – | 0 | 5 | – | 3 | – | 0 |
| Capital | 4 | – | 3 | – | 0 | 5 | – | 3 | – | 0 |
| Denison | 3 | – | 3 | – | 2 | 4 | – | 3 | – | 2 |
| Wittenberg | 3 | – | 3 | – | 2 | 4 | – | 3 | – | 2 |
| Ohio Wesleyan | 1 | – | 2 | – | 2 | 3 | – | 4 | – | 2 |
| Otterbein | 2 | – | 4 | – | 1 | 2 | – | 5 | – | 1 |
| Mount Union | 1 | – | 5 | – | 1 | 1 | – | 5 | – | 2 |
| Kenyon | 0 | – | 4 | – | 0 | 0 | – | 7 | – | 0 |
| Marietta | 0 | – | 5 | – | 0 | 0 | – | 8 | – | 0 |
| Oberlin | 0 | – | 5 | – | 0 | 0 | – | 8 | – | 0 |
$ – Conference champion

1955 Ohio Valley Conference football standings
| | Conf. | | | | | Overall |
| Team | W | | L | | T | W | | L | | T |
|---|---|---|---|---|---|---|---|---|---|---|
| Tennessee Tech $ | 5 | – | 0 | – | 0 | 7 | – | 3 | – | 0 |
| Middle Tennessee | 4 | – | 1 | – | 0 | 7 | – | 2 | – | 1 |
| Eastern Kentucky | 3 | – | 2 | – | 0 | 5 | – | 4 | – | 1 |
| Murray State | 2 | – | 3 | – | 0 | 6 | – | 4 | – | 0 |
| Western Kentucky | 1 | – | 4 | – | 0 | 3 | – | 6 | – | 0 |
| Morehead State | 0 | – | 5 | – | 0 | 0 | – | 9 | – | 0 |
$ – Conference champion

1955 Oklahoma Collegiate Conference football standings
| | Conf. | | | | | Overall |
| Team | W | | L | | T | W | | L | | T |
|---|---|---|---|---|---|---|---|---|---|---|
| Central State (OK) + | 4 | – | 1 | – | 0 | 8 | – | 1 | – | 0 |
| Northeastern State + | 4 | – | 1 | – | 0 | 7 | – | 1 | – | 0 |
| SW Oklahoma State + | 4 | – | 1 | – | 0 | 6 | – | 3 | – | 0 |
| SE Oklahoma State | 1 | – | 4 | – | 0 | 3 | – | 6 | – | 1 |
| East Central | 1 | – | 4 | – | 0 | 3 | – | 6 | – | 0 |
| NW Oklahoma State | 1 | – | 4 | – | 0 | 3 | – | 6 | – | 0 |
+ – Conference co-champions

1955 Oregon Collegiate Conference football standings
| | Conf. | | | | | Overall |
| Team | W | | L | | T | W | | L | | T |
|---|---|---|---|---|---|---|---|---|---|---|
| Eastern Oregon + | 3 | – | 1 | – | 0 | 5 | – | 3 | – | 0 |
| Oregon College + | 3 | – | 1 | – | 0 | 5 | – | 3 | – | 0 |
| Southern Oregon + | 3 | – | 1 | – | 0 | 4 | – | 5 | – | 0 |
| Portland State | 1 | – | 3 | – | 0 | 2 | – | 6 | – | 0 |
| Oregon Tech | 0 | – | 4 | – | 0 | 0 | – | 8 | – | 0 |
+ – Conference co-champions

1955 Pennsylvania State Teachers College Conference football standings
| | Conf. | | | | | Overall |
| Team | W | | L | | T | W | | L | | T |
|---|---|---|---|---|---|---|---|---|---|---|
| Bloomsburg $ | 3 | – | 0 | – | 1 | 5 | – | 2 | – | 1 |
| West Chester | 3 | – | 1 | – | 0 | 6 | – | 3 | – | 0 |
| Lock Haven | 5 | – | 2 | – | 1 | 5 | – | 2 | – | 2 |
| Indiana (PA) | 3 | – | 2 | – | 0 | 3 | – | 5 | – | 0 |
| Clarion | 3 | – | 1 | – | 1 | 4 | – | 3 | – | 1 |
| California (PA) | 4 | – | 3 | – | 0 | 4 | – | 4 | – | 0 |
| Shippensburg | 3 | – | 2 | – | 1 | 4 | – | 2 | – | 2 |
| East Stroudsburg | 3 | – | 2 | – | 0 | 4 | – | 3 | – | 0 |
| Slippery Rock | 2 | – | 2 | – | 0 | 3 | – | 4 | – | 0 |
| Millersville | 3 | – | 3 | – | 0 | 4 | – | 3 | – | 1 |
| Edinboro | 1 | – | 4 | – | 0 | 1 | – | 8 | – | 0 |
| Mansfield | 1 | – | 5 | – | 0 | 1 | – | 6 | – | 0 |
| Cheyney | 0 | – | 3 | – | 1 | 1 | – | 5 | – | 1 |
| Kutztown | 0 | – | 5 | – | 1 | 1 | – | 5 | – | 2 |
$ – Conference champion; Conference standings were based on the Saylor system of ratings.

1955 Prairie College Conference football standings
| | Conf. | | | | | Overall |
| Team | W | | L | | T | W | | L | | T |
|---|---|---|---|---|---|---|---|---|---|---|
| Illinois College + | 2 | – | 1 | – | 0 | 4 | – | 1 | – | 1 |
| Principia + | 2 | – | 1 | – | 0 | 3 | – | 2 | – | 2 |
| Eureka | 1 | – | 2 | – | 0 | 1 | – | 6 | – | 1 |
| Rose Poly | 1 | – | 2 | – | 0 | 1 | – | 6 | – | 1 |
+ – Conference co-champions

1955 Presidents' Athletic Conference football standings
| | Conf. | | | | | Overall |
| Team | W | | L | | T | W | | L | | T |
|---|---|---|---|---|---|---|---|---|---|---|
| Western Reserve $ | 3 | – | 0 | – | 0 | 5 | – | 1 | – | 1 |
| John Carroll | 2 | – | 2 | – | 1 | 3 | – | 3 | – | 1 |
| Case Tech | 2 | – | 3 | – | 0 | 3 | – | 3 | – | 0 |
| Wayne | 1 | – | 3 | – | 1 | 1 | – | 5 | – | 1 |
$ – Conference champion

1955 Rocky Mountain Conference football standings
| | Conf. | | | | | Overall |
| Team | W | | L | | T | W | | L | | T |
|---|---|---|---|---|---|---|---|---|---|---|
| Idaho State $ | 6 | – | 0 | – | 0 | 8 | – | 1 | – | 0 |
| Western State (CO) | 6 | – | 2 | – | 0 | 7 | – | 3 | – | 0 |
| Montana State | 3 | – | 2 | – | 1 | 4 | – | 4 | – | 1 |
| Colorado Mines | 2 | – | 4 | – | 2 | 2 | – | 5 | – | 2 |
| Colorado College | 2 | – | 6 | – | 0 | 3 | – | 7 | – | 0 |
| Colorado State–Greeley | 1 | – | 6 | – | 1 | 1 | – | 7 | – | 1 |
$ – Conference champion

1955 South Dakota Intercollegiate Conference football standings
| | Conf. | | | | | Overall |
| Team | W | | L | | T | W | | L | | T |
|---|---|---|---|---|---|---|---|---|---|---|
| Northern State $ | 7 | – | 0 | – | 0 | 9 | – | 1 | – | 0 |
| Huron | 5 | – | 1 | – | 1 | 5 | – | 2 | – | 1 |
| Southern State (SD) | 5 | – | 2 | – | 0 | 6 | – | 2 | – | 0 |
| Dakota Wesleyan | 3 | – | 2 | – | 2 | 4 | – | 3 | – | 2 |
| Yankton | 3 | – | 4 | – | 1 | 3 | – | 4 | – | 1 |
| South Dakota Mines | 2 | – | 3 | – | 2 | 2 | – | 4 | – | 2 |
| Black Hills | 1 | – | 3 | – | 2 | 1 | – | 4 | – | 2 |
| General Beadle | 1 | – | 6 | – | 0 | 1 | – | 6 | – | 0 |
| Sioux Falls | 0 | – | 6 | – | 0 | 0 | – | 7 | – | 0 |
$ – Conference champion

1955 Southern California Intercollegiate Athletic Conference football standings
| | Conf. | | | | | Overall |
| Team | W | | L | | T | W | | L | | T |
|---|---|---|---|---|---|---|---|---|---|---|
| Pomona-Claremont $ | 4 | – | 0 | – | 0 | 7 | – | 1 | – | 0 |
| Whittier | 3 | – | 1 | – | 0 | 8 | – | 2 | – | 0 |
| Occidental | 2 | – | 2 | – | 0 | 6 | – | 2 | – | 0 |
| Redlands | 1 | – | 3 | – | 0 | 4 | – | 5 | – | 0 |
| Caltech | 0 | – | 4 | – | 0 | 1 | – | 6 | – | 0 |
$ – Conference champion

1955 Southern Intercollegiate Athletic Conference football standings
| | Conf. | | | | | Overall |
| Team | W | | L | | T | W | | L | | T |
|---|---|---|---|---|---|---|---|---|---|---|
| No. 3 Florida A&M $ | 6 | – | 0 | – | 0 | 7 | – | 1 | – | 1 |
| Bethune–Cookman | 4 | – | 2 | – | 0 | 5 | – | 4 | – | 1 |
| Xavier (LA) | 4 | – | 2 | – | 0 | 5 | – | 3 | – | 0 |
| No. 15 Morris Brown | 5 | – | 1 | – | 0 | 6 | – | 3 | – | 0 |
| Alabama State | 6 | – | 2 | – | 0 | 7 | – | 2 | – | 0 |
| Allen | 4 | – | 2 | – | 0 | 6 | – | 2 | – | 0 |
| Alabama A&M | 4 | – | 2 | – | 1 | 5 | – | 2 | – | 1 |
| South Carolina State | 3 | – | 3 | – | 0 | 3 | – | 6 | – | 0 |
| Knoxville | 3 | – | 3 | – | 0 | 4 | – | 5 | – | 0 |
| Clark (GA) | 2 | – | 5 | – | 1 | 2 | – | 5 | – | 1 |
| Tuskegee | 1 | – | 5 | – | 2 | 2 | – | 6 | – | 2 |
| Fort Valley State | 2 | – | 6 | – | 0 | 3 | – | 6 | – | 0 |
| Morehouse | 1 | – | 4 | – | 1 | 3 | – | 4 | – | 1 |
| Benedict | 1 | – | 5 | – | 1 | 2 | – | 6 | – | 1 |
| Fisk | 1 | – | 5 | – | 0 | 2 | – | 8 | – | 0 |
| Lane | 1 | – | 1 | – | 0 | 3 | – | 4 | – | 0 |
$ – Conference champion; Standings were based on Dickinson System ratings.; Rankings from The Pittsburgh Courier.

1955 Southwestern Athletic Conference football standings
| | Conf. | | | | | Overall |
| Team | W | | L | | T | W | | L | | T |
|---|---|---|---|---|---|---|---|---|---|---|
| No. 5 Southern $ | 6 | – | 1 | – | 0 | 7 | – | 2 | – | 1 |
| No. 10 Prairie View A&M | 5 | – | 1 | – | 1 | 8 | – | 2 | – | 1 |
| No. 8 Texas Southern | 5 | – | 1 | – | 1 | 7 | – | 2 | – | 1 |
| No. 6 Langston | 4 | – | 1 | – | 2 | 6 | – | 1 | – | 2 |
| Texas College | 2 | – | 5 | – | 0 | 3 | – | 6 | – | 0 |
| Wiley | 2 | – | 5 | – | 0 | 3 | – | 7 | – | 0 |
| Arkansas AM&N | 2 | – | 5 | – | 0 | 2 | – | 8 | – | 0 |
| Bishop | 0 | – | 7 | – | 0 | 0 | – | 10 | – | 0 |
$ – Conference champion; Rankings from the Pittsburgh Courier.

1955 Texas Conference football standings
| | Conf. | | | | | Overall |
| Team | W | | L | | T | W | | L | | T |
|---|---|---|---|---|---|---|---|---|---|---|
| McMurry $ | 2 | – | 0 | – | 0 | 8 | – | 2 | – | 0 |
| Howard Payne | 1 | – | 1 | – | 0 | 6 | – | 2 | – | 2 |
| Eastern New Mexico | 0 | – | 2 | – | 0 | 5 | – | 4 | – | 0 |
$ – Conference champion

1955 Virginia Little Seven Conference football standings
| | Conf. | | | | | Overall |
| Team | W | | L | | T | W | | L | | T |
|---|---|---|---|---|---|---|---|---|---|---|
| Hampden–Sydney + | 2 | – | 1 | – | 0 | 8 | – | 1 | – | 0 |
| Randolph–Macon + | 2 | – | 1 | – | 0 | 6 | – | 2 | – | 1 |
| Emory and Henry | 1 | – | 1 | – | 0 | 6 | – | 3 | – | 1 |
| Bridgewater | 0 | – | 2 | – | 0 | 2 | – | 5 | – | 0 |
$ – Conference champion

1955 West Virginia Intercollegiate Athletic Conference football standings
| | Conf. | | | | | Overall |
| Team | W | | L | | T | W | | L | | T |
|---|---|---|---|---|---|---|---|---|---|---|
| Shepherd $ | 4 | – | 0 | – | 0 | 8 | – | 0 | – | 0 |
| Concord | 5 | – | 2 | – | 0 | 5 | – | 4 | – | 0 |
| West Virginia Tech | 3 | – | 2 | – | 0 | 5 | – | 3 | – | 1 |
| Fairmont State | 6 | – | 3 | – | 0 | 6 | – | 3 | – | 0 |
| West Liberty State | 3 | – | 3 | – | 0 | 3 | – | 4 | – | 1 |
| Potomac State | 4 | – | 4 | – | 0 | 4 | – | 4 | – | 0 |
| West Virginia Wesleyan | 3 | – | 4 | – | 0 | 3 | – | 5 | – | 0 |
| Salem | 3 | – | 4 | – | 0 | 4 | – | 4 | – | 0 |
| Glenville State | 1 | – | 7 | – | 0 | 1 | – | 7 | – | 0 |
| Davis & Elkins | 0 | – | 7 | – | 0 | 0 | – | 7 | – | 0 |
| Morris Harvey * | 2 | – | 0 | – | 0 | 4 | – | 5 | – | 0 |
| Bethany (WV) * | 2 | – | 0 | – | 0 | 6 | – | 1 | – | 0 |
| Bluefield State * | 1 | – | 0 | – | 0 | 7 | – | 2 | – | 1 |
| West Virginia State * | 0 | – | 1 | – | 0 | 1 | – | 7 | – | 0 |
$ – Conference champion; * – Did not qualify for conference standings Conference standings based on power ratings

1955 Wisconsin State College Conference football standings
| | Conf. | | | | | Overall |
| Team | W | | L | | T | W | | L | | T |
|---|---|---|---|---|---|---|---|---|---|---|
| Stevens Point State $ | 6 | – | 0 | – | 0 | 8 | – | 0 | – | 0 |
| River Falls State | 4 | – | 1 | – | 0 | 7 | – | 1 | – | 0 |
| La Crosse State | 4 | – | 1 | – | 0 | 4 | – | 4 | – | 1 |
| Eau Claire State | 5 | – | 2 | – | 0 | 5 | – | 3 | – | 0 |
| Platteville State | 3 | – | 2 | – | 0 | 5 | – | 2 | – | 0 |
| Milwaukee State | 2 | – | 3 | – | 0 | 2 | – | 6 | – | 0 |
| Whitewater State | 1 | – | 3 | – | 1 | 1 | – | 4 | – | 1 |
| Stout State | 0 | – | 4 | – | 1 | 2 | – | 5 | – | 1 |
| Superior State | 0 | – | 4 | – | 1 | 0 | – | 7 | – | 2 |
| Oshkosh State | 0 | – | 5 | – | 1 | 0 | – | 5 | – | 2 |
$ – Conference champion

1955 Yankee Conference football standings
| | Conf. | | | | | Overall |
| Team | W | | L | | T | W | | L | | T |
|---|---|---|---|---|---|---|---|---|---|---|
| Rhode Island $ | 4 | – | 0 | – | 1 | 6 | – | 1 | – | 2 |
| Maine | 2 | – | 1 | – | 1 | 5 | – | 1 | – | 1 |
| Connecticut | 2 | – | 2 | – | 0 | 4 | – | 4 | – | 0 |
| New Hampshire | 1 | – | 1 | – | 2 | 2 | – | 4 | – | 2 |
| UMass | 1 | – | 3 | – | 0 | 4 | – | 4 | – | 0 |
| Vermont | 0 | – | 3 | – | 0 | 3 | – | 3 | – | 1 |
$ – Conference champion

== Rankings ==
=== Final AP poll ===
The final rankings were made on November 28, after the regular season and without consideration of the postseason bowl games:

| 1. Oklahoma | (10–0–0) | Big 7 |
| 2. Michigan State | (8–1–0) | Big 10 |
| 3. Maryland | (10–0–0) | ACC |
| 4. UCLA | (9–1–0) | PCC |
| 5. Ohio State | (7–2–0) | Big 10 |
| 6. TCU | (9–1–0) | SWC |
| 7. Georgia Tech | (8–1–1) | SEC |
| 8. Auburn | (8–1–1) | SEC |
| 9. Notre Dame | (8–2–0) | Indep. |
| 10. Mississippi | (9–1–0) | SEC |
| 11. Pittsburgh | (7–3–0) | Indep. |
| 12. Michigan | (7–2–0) | Big 10 |
| 13. USC | (6–4–0) | PCC |
| 14. Miami (Florida) | (6–3–0) | Indep. |
| 15. Miami (Ohio) | (9–0–0) | MAC |
| 16. Stanford | (6–3–1) | PCC |
| 17. Texas A&M | (7–2–1) | SWC |
| 18. Navy | (6–2–1) | Indep. |
| 19. West Virginia | (8–2–0) | Southern |
| 20. Army | (6–3–0) | Indep. |

=== Final Coaches Poll ===
| Ranking | Team |
|---|---|
| 1 | Oklahoma |
| 2 | Michigan State |
| 3 | Maryland |
| 4 | UCLA |
| 5 | Ohio State |
| 6 | Texas Christian |
| 7 | Georgia Tech |
| 8 | Auburn |
| 9 | Mississippi |
| 10 | Notre Dame |
| 11 | Pittsburgh |
| 12 | USC |
| 13 | Michigan |
| 14 | Texas A&M |
| 15 | Army |
| 16 | Duke |
| 17 | West Virginia |
| 18 | Miami (Fla.) |
| 19 | Iowa |
| 20 (t) | Navy |
| 20 (t) | Stanford |
| 20 (t) | Miami (Ohio) |

== Other champions ==
=== Orange Blossom Classic ===
Prior to the integration of sports teams, Miami Orange Bowl stadium hosted the New Year's Day game of the same name, and a December game for historically black colleges, the Orange Blossom Classic. Grambling (9–0) and Florida A&M (8–0–1) met to determine the best Negro college football team in the nation, with Grambling winning, 28–21.

== Undefeated seasons ==
| Team | Record | Notes |
|---|---|---|
| Oklahoma | 11–0 | Consensus national champion, Orange Bowl champion |
| Grambling | 10–0 | Black college national champion, winner of Orange Blossom Classic |
| Miami (OH) | 9–0 | MAC champion, No. 15 in final AP Poll |
| Heidelberg | 9–0 | OAC second place |
| Hillsdale | 9–0 | MIAA champion, part of 32-game winning streak, Nate Clark national scoring leader |
| Southeast Missouri State | 9–0 | MIAA champion |
| Whitworth | 9–0 | Evergreen champion, 18-game winning streak |
| College of Emporia | 9–0 | KCAC champion |
| Maryland State | 9–0 | CIAA champion |
| Alfred | 8–0 | Consecutive perfect seasons in 1955 and 1956 |
| Centre | 8–0 | Independent |
| Drexel | 8–0 | Independent |
| Muskingum | 8–0 | Ohio Athletic Conference champion |
| Shepherd | 8–0 | WVIAC champion, led country with 33.9 points per game |
| Stevens Point State | 8–0 | WSCC champion |
| Juniata | 8–0–1 | Tied with Missouri Valley in Tangerine Bowl |
| Trinity (CT) | 7–0 | Independent |

Others included Albany State, Coe, Parsons.

== Bowl games ==
=== Major bowls ===
Monday, January 2, 1956

| Bowl game | Winning team | | Losing team | |
|---|---|---|---|---|
| Orange Bowl | No. 1 Oklahoma | 20 | No. 3 Maryland | 6 |
| Rose Bowl | No. 2 Michigan State | 17 | No. 4 UCLA | 14 |
| Cotton Bowl Classic | No. 10 Ole Miss | 14 | No. 6 TCU | 13 |
| Sugar Bowl | No. 7 Georgia Tech | 7 | No. 11 Pittsburgh | 0 |

=== Other bowls ===
| Bowl game | Location | Date | Winning team | Score | Losing team |
|---|---|---|---|---|---|
| Gator Bowl | Jacksonville, FL | December 31 | Vanderbilt | 25–13 | No. 8 Auburn |
| Sun Bowl | El Paso, TX | January 2 | Wyoming | 21–14 | Texas Tech |
| Tangerine Bowl | Orlando, FL | January 2 | Juanita | 6–6 | Missouri Valley |

== Statistical leaders ==
- Player scoring most points: Jim Swink, TCU, 125.

== Heisman Trophy voting ==
The Heisman Trophy is given to the year's most outstanding player

| Player | School | Position | 1st | 2nd | 3rd | Total |
|---|---|---|---|---|---|---|
| Howard Cassady | Ohio State | HB | 594 | 179 | 79 | 2,219 |
| Jim Swink | TCU | HB | 128 | 120 | 118 | 742 |
| George Welsh | Navy | QB | 56 | 70 | 75 | 383 |
| Earl Morrall | Michigan State | QB | 23 | 97 | 60 | 323 |
| Paul Hornung | Notre Dame | QB | 33 | 72 | 78 | 321 |
| Bob Pellegrini | Maryland | C | 38 | 64 | 52 | 294 |
| Ron Beagle | Navy | E | 21 | 44 | 61 | 212 |
| Ron Kramer | Michigan | E | 12 | 50 | 56 | 192 |
| Bo Bolinger | Oklahoma | G | 14 | 32 | 42 | 148 |
| Cal Jones | Iowa | G | 14 | 40 | 16 | 138 |

== Statistical leaders ==
=== Individual ===
==== Total offense ====
Major college
The following players were the individual leaders in total offense among major college football players during the 1955 season:
1. George Welsh, Navy, 1,348 yards
2. Art Luppino, Arizona, 1,313 yards
3. Jim Swink, TCU, 1,283 yards
4. Paul Hornung, Notre Dame, 1,215 yards
5. Johnny Majors, Tennessee, 1,133 yards
6. John Roach, SMU, 1,126 yards
7. Jerry Reichow, Iowa, 1,091 yards
8. Earl Morrall, Michigan State, 1,047 yards
9. John Brodie, Stanford, 1,044 yards
10. Jim Haluska, Wisconsin, 1,012 yards

Small college
The following players were the individual leaders in total offense among small college football players during the 1955 season:
1. Jim Stehlin, Brandeis, 1,455 yards
2. Bill Engelhardt, Omaha, 1,416 yards
3. William "Brub" Hamilton, Florence State, 1,369 yards
4. Dick Zahn, Hiram, 1,293 yards
5. Bill Rhodes, Colorado Western, 1,153 yards
6. Edward "Bo" Murray, Grambling, 1,151 yards
7. Gene Scott, Centre, 1,138 yards
8. Pat Tarquinio, Juniata, 1,115 yards
9. Tom Dingle, Wooster, 1,100
10. Bernie Raterink, Central Michigan, 1,044 yards

==== Passing ====
Major college
The following players were the individual leaders in pass completions among major college football players during the 1955 season:
1. George Welsh, Navy, 94 of 150 (.627), 1,319 yards, 6 interceptions, 8 touchdowns
2. Claude Benham, Columbia, 89 of 188 (.473), 999 yards, 15 interceptions, 7 touchdowns
3. Len Dawson, Purdue, 87 of 155 (.561), 1,005 yards, 14 interceptions, 7 touchdowns
4. John Brodie, Stanford, 76 of 133 (.571), 1,024 yards, 7 interceptions, 5 touchdowns
5. Bill Beagle, Dartmouth, 75 of 155 (.484), 812 yards, 12 interceptions, 6 touchdowns
6. Ken Ford, Hardin-Simmons, 73 of 135 (.541), 854 yards, 10 interceptions, 8 touchdowns
7. Jim Haluska, Wisconsin, 71 of 132 (.538), 1,036 yards, 10 interceptions, 6 touchdowns
8. Nick Consoles, Wake Forest, 66 of 123 (.537), 787 yards, 8 interceptions, 6 touchdowns
9. Joe Clements, Texas, 65 of 128 (.508), 818 yards, 13 interceptions, 6 touchdowns
10. John Roach, SMU, 64 of 141 (.454), 907 yards, 14 interceptions, 6 touchdowns

Small college
The following players were the individual leaders in pass completions among small college football players during the 1955 season:
1. Foley, Hamline, 87 of 167 (.521), 1,034 yards, 8 interceptions, 6 touchdowns
2. Stehlin, Brandeis, 76 of 147 (.517), 1,226 yards, 13 interceptions, 10 tochddowns
3. Magee, San Diego State, 66 of 123 (.537), 792 yards, 12 interceptions, 4 touchdowns
4. Belton, Davidson, 60 of 130 (.462), 839 yards, 8 interceptions, 5 touchdowns
5. Webb, St. Ambrose, 60 of 132 (.455), 899 yards, 8 interceptions, 7 touchdowns
6. Arnecke, Trinity (TX), 58 of 115 (.504), 752 yards, 7 interceptions, 3 touchdowns
7. Palmer, Baldwin-Wallace, 58 of 121 (.479), 578 yards, 11 interceptions, 5 touchdowns
8. Karas, Geneva, 57 of 104 (.548), 616 yards, 6 interceptions, 4 touchdowns
9. Zahn, Hiram, 55 of 124 (.444), 1,214 yards, 9 interceptions, 10 touchdowns
10. Kessler, Capital, 54 of 117 (.462), 869 yards, 11 interceptions, 7 touchdowns

==== Rushing ====
Major college
The following players were the individual leaders in rushing yards among major college football players during the 1955 season:
1. Art Luppino, Arizona, 1,313 yards on 209 carries (6.28 average)
2. Jim Swink, TCU, 1,283 on 157 carries (8.17 average)
3. Howard Cassady, Ohio State, 958 yards on 161 carries (5.95 average)
4. Fob James, Auburn, 879 yards on 123 carries (7.15 average)
5. Jim Brown, UCLA, 829 yards on 130 carries (6.38 average)
6. Bobby Moss, West Virginia, 807 yards on 98 carries (8.23 average)
7. Joel Wells, Clemson, 782 yards on 134 carries (5.79 average)
8. Jim Bakhtiar, Virginia, 733 yards on 158 carries (4.64 average)
9. Bob Pascal, Duke, 750 yards on 156 carries (4.81 average)
10. Jim Shanley, Oregon, 711 yards on 100 carries (7.11 average)

Small college
The following players were the individual leaders in rushing yards among small college football players during the 1955 season:
1. Scott, Centre, 1138 yards on 107 carries (10.64 average)
2. Bill Rhodes, Colorado Western, 1,112 yards on 142 carries (7.83 average)
3. Dingle, Wooster, 1,100 yards on 128 carries (8.59 average)
4. Raterink, Central Michigan, 1,044 yards on 128 carries (8.16 average)
5. Taylor, Florence State, 1,021 yards on 196 carries
6. Raab, Alma, 980 yards on 103 carries (9.51 average)
7. Nate Clark, Hillsdale, 949 yards on 153 carries (6.20 average)
8. Livingston, Heidelberg, 931 yards on 144 carries (6.47 average)
9. Murray, Grambling, 924 yards on 117 carries (7.90 average)
10. Boles, Sam Houston State, 906 yards on 133 carries (6.81 average)

==== Receiving ====
Major college
The following players were the individual leaders in receptions among major college football players during the 1955 season:
1. Hank Burnine, Missouri, 44 receptions, 594 yards, 2 touchdowns
2. Johnny Bredice, Boston University, 35 receptions, 468 yards, 4 touchdowns
3. Barnes, Wake Forest, 31 receptions, 349 yards, 0 touchdowns
4. Ron Beagle, Navy, 30 receptions, 451 yards, 4 touchdowns
5. Hurley, Montana, 25 receptions, 431 yards, 2 touchdowns
6. Jimmy Orr, Georgia, 24 receptions, 443 yards, 3 touchdowns
6. Sanders, Colorado A&M, 24 receptions, 351 yards, 3 touchdowns
6. Pascoe, Dartmouth, 24 receptions, 331 yards, 3 touchdowns
6. Massegee, Hardin-Simmons, 24 receptions, 321 yards, 4 touchdowns
6. Seitz, Columbia, 24 receptions, 286 yards, 1 touchdown

Small college
The following players were the individual leaders in receptions among small college football players during the 1955 season:
1. Donlin, Hamline, 41 receptions, 480 yards, 2 touchdowns
2. Rogers, Fresno State, 33 receptions, 350 yards, 3 touchdowns
3. Cox, Cal Poly, 32 receptions, 613 yards, 8 touchdowns
4. Rychlec, American International, 30 receptions, 383 yards, 1 touchdown
5. Lashmet, Western Illinois, 29 receptions, 567 yards, 4 touchdowns
5. Hecker, Bowling Green, 29 receptions, 566 yards, 6 touchdowns
5. Joseph, Baldwin-Wallace, 29 receptions, 290 yards, 2 touchdowns
8. Davis, Arkansas Tech, 28 receptions, 521 yards, 4 touchdowns
9. Payne, William Jewell, 27 receptions, 413 yards, 1 touchdown
9. Price, Geneva, 27 receptions, 349 yards, 2 touchdowns

==== Scoring ====
Major college
The following players were the individual leaders in scoring among major college football players during the 1955 season:
1. Jim Swink, TCU, 125 points (20 TD, 5 PAT)
2. Jon Arnett, USC, 108 points (15 TD, 18 PAT)
3. Tommy McDonald, Oklahoma, 96 points (16 TD)
3. Ed Vereb, Maryland, 96 points (16 TD)
3. Art Luppino, 96 points (13 TD, 18 PAT)
6. Howard Cassady, 90 points (15 TD)
7. Paige Cothren, Ole Miss, 74 points (6 TD, 20 PAT, 6 FG)
8. Charles Horton, Vanderbilt, 73 points (12 TD, 1 PAT)
9. Jim Brown, UCLA, 69 points (9 TD, 15 PAT)
10. Jack Morris, Oregon, 67 points (8 TD, 19 PAT)

Small college
The following players were the individual leaders in scoring among small college football players during the 1955 season:
1. Nate Clark, Hillsdale, 144 points (24 TD)
2. Lehman, St. John's (MN), 109 points (16 TD, 13 PAT)
3. Raterink, Central Michigan, 108 points (18 TD)
4. Livingston, Heidelberg, 102 points (17 TD)
5. Rosenberg, Coe, 93 points (11 TD, 27 PAT)
5. Dervin, Mississippi Vocational, 93 points (15 TD, 3 PAT)
7. Murray, Grambling, 92 points (13 TD, 14 PAT)
8. Bill Rhodes, Colorado Western, 91 points (14 TD, 7 PAT)
9. Lutterbach, Evansville, 90 points (15 TD)
10. Raab, Alma, 85 points (14 TD, 1 PAT)

=== Team ===
==== Total offense ====
Major college
The following teams were the leaders in total offense in major college football during the 1955 season:
1. Oklahoma, 410.7 yards per game
2. West Virginia, 384.5 yards per game
3. Denver, 368.9 yards per game
4. Michigan State, 364.4 yards per game
5. Navy, 358.6 yards per game
6. Notre Dame, 357.3 yards per game
7. Stanford, 355.1 yards per game
8. TCU, 353.1 yards per game
9. Miami (FL), 344.9 yards per game
10. Ole Miss, 339.6 yards per game

Small college
The following teams were the leaders in total offense in small college football during the 1955 season:
1. Centre, 431.0 yards per game
2. Arizona State, 417.1 per game
3. Central Michigan, 413.0 yards per game
4. Florida A&M, 379.9 yards per game
5. Coe, 379.0 yards per game
6. Grambling, 375.7 yards per game
7. College of Emporia, 373.6 yards per game
8. Southwestern (TN), 373.4 yards per game
9. Hillsdale, 370.2 yards per game
10. Muskingum, 366.4 yards per game

==== Total defense ====
Major college
The following teams were the leaders in total defense in major college football during the 1955 season:
1. Army, 160.7 yards per game
2. Maryland, 169.1 yards per game
3. Navy, 181.7 yards per game
4. Auburn, 183.2 yards per game
5. Holy Cross, 183.5 yards per game
6. Oklahoma, 186.4 yards per game
7. Detroit, 194.1 yards per game
8. West Virginia, 194.8 yards per game
9. George Washington, 197.7 yards per game
10. Georgia Tech, 199.9 yards per game

Small college
The following teams were the leaders in total defense in small college football during the 1955 season:
1. College of Emporia, 102.0 yards per game
2. National Aggies, 117.6 yards per game
3. North Carolina A&T, 118.4 yards per game
4. Geneva, 121.8 yards per game
5. Mississippi Southern, 122.3 yards per game
6. Allen, 123.6 yards per game
7. Shaw, 126.8 yards per game
8. Moravian, 128.6 yards per game
9. Shippensberg State, 130.8 yards per game
10. Virginia State, 131.5 yards per game

== See also ==
- 1955 College Football All-America Team
