= 1955 Florida State Seminoles football team =

American college football season

1955 Florida State Seminoles football
- Conference: Independent
- Record: 5–5
- Head coach: Tom Nugent (3rd season)
- Captains: Bob Crenshaw; Don Powell
- Home stadium: Doak Campbell Stadium

1955 Southern college football independents records
	Conf.			Overall
Team	W	L	T	W		L		T
Centre		–		8	–	0	–	0
Mississippi Southern		–		9	–	1	–	0
Delaware		–		8	–	1	–	0
Louisville		–		7	–	2	–	0
Tampa		–		7	–	2	–	0
No. 18 Navy		–		6	–	2	–	1
Arkansas State		–		6	–	3	–	0
No. 14 Miami (FL)		–		6	–	3	–	0
Chattanooga		–		5	–	4	–	1
Florida State		–		5	–	5	–	0
Memphis State		–		2	–	7	–	0
Howard (AL)		–		1	–	8	–	0
Sewanee		–		1	–	8	–	0
Rankings from AP Poll

The 1955 Florida State Seminoles football team represented Florida State University as an independent during the 1955 college football season. Led by third-year head coach Tom Nugent, the Seminoles compiled a record of 5–5.

== Schedule ==
Date	Time	Opponent	Site	Result	Attendance	Source
September 17		NC State	Doak Campbell Stadium; Tallahassee, FL	W 7–0	15,352	
September 30		at Miami (FL)	Burdine Stadium; Miami, FL (rivalry)	L 0–34	42,363	
October 8	8:00 p.m.	VPI	Doak Campbell Stadium; Tallahassee, FL	L 20–24	13,268	
October 15		Georgia	Doak Campbell Stadium; Tallahassee, FL	L 14–47	18,687	
October 22		at No. 13 Georgia Tech	Grant Field; Atlanta, GA	L 0–34	30,000	
November 5		Villanova	Doak Campbell Stadium; Tallahassee, FL	W 16–13	9,700	
November 11		at Furman	Sirrine Stadium; Greenville, SC	W 19–6	3,000	
November 19		The Citadel	Doak Campbell Stadium; Tallahassee, FL	W 39–0	15,765	
November 25		at Mississippi Southern	Faulkner Field; Hattiesburg, MS	L 6–21	7,000	
December 3		at Tampa	Phillips Field; Tampa, FL	W 26–7	13,000	
Rankings from AP Poll released prior to the game; All times are in Eastern time
