= 1955 South Dakota Coyotes football team =

American college football season

1955 South Dakota Coyotes football
- Conference: North Central Conference
- Record: 4–4 (3–3 NCC)
- Head coach: Harry Gamage (17th season)
- Home stadium: Inman Field

1955 North Central Conference football standings
	Conf.					Overall
Team	W		L		T	W		L		T
South Dakota State $	5	–	0	–	1	6	–	2	–	1
Iowa State Teachers	5	–	1	–	0	8	–	1	–	0
Morningside	3	–	2	–	1	4	–	3	–	1
North Dakota	3	–	3	–	0	6	–	3	–	0
South Dakota	3	–	3	–	0	4	–	4	–	0
Augustana (SD)	1	–	5	–	0	2	–	6	–	1
North Dakota State	0	–	6	–	0	0	–	9	–	0
$ – Conference champion

The 1955 South Dakota Coyotes football team was an American football team that represented the University of South Dakota as a member of the North Central Conference (NCC) during the 1955 college football season. In their 17th season under head coach Harry Gamage, the Coyotes compiled a 4–4 record (3–3 against NCC opponents), tied for fifth place out of seven teams in the NCC, and outscored opponents by a total of 191 to 151. They played their home games at Inman Field in Vermillion, South Dakota.

== Schedule ==
Date	Opponent	Site	Result	Attendance	Source
September 24	St. Cloud Teachers*	Inman Field; Vermillion, SD	L 7–20	3,000	
October 1	at Augustana (SD)	Viking Field; Sioux Falls, SD	W 35–18		
October 8	Black Hills Teachers*	Inman Field; Vermillion, SD	W 46–7	3,000	
October 15	at North Dakota State	Dacotah Field; Fargo, ND	W 45–28		
October 22	Morningside^{†}	Inman Field; Vermillion, SD (Dakota Day)	W 11–0	9,000	
October 29	at South Dakota State	State Field; Brookings, SD (Hobo Day, rivalry)	L 7–27	10,000	
November 5	Iowa State Teachers	Inman Field; Vermillion, SD	L 26–33		
November 12	North Dakota	Inman Field; Vermillion, SD (Sitting Bull Trophy)	L 14–18		
*Non-conference game; ^{†}Homecoming
