= 1955 Louisville Cardinals football team =

American college football season

1955 Louisville Cardinals football
- Conference: Independent
- Record: 7–2
- Head coach: Frank Camp (10th season)
- Home stadium: Parkway Field

1955 Southern college football independents records
	Conf.			Overall
Team	W	L	T	W		L		T
Centre		–		8	–	0	–	0
Mississippi Southern		–		9	–	1	–	0
Delaware		–		8	–	1	–	0
Louisville		–		7	–	2	–	0
Tampa		–		7	–	2	–	0
No. 18 Navy		–		6	–	2	–	1
Arkansas State		–		6	–	3	–	0
No. 14 Miami (FL)		–		6	–	3	–	0
Chattanooga		–		5	–	4	–	1
Florida State		–		5	–	5	–	0
Memphis State		–		2	–	7	–	0
Howard (AL)		–		1	–	8	–	0
Sewanee		–		1	–	8	–	0
Rankings from AP Poll

The 1955 Louisville Cardinals football team was an American football team that represented the University of Louisville as an independent during the 1955 college football season. In their 10th season under head coach Frank Camp, the Cardinals compiled a 7–2 record.

== Schedule ==
Date	Time	Opponent	Site	Result	Attendance	Source
September 17		at Murray State	Cutchin Stadium; Murray, KY	L 14–33		
September 24		at Xavier	Xavier Stadium; Cincinnati, OH	L 20–49	4,500	
October 1		Wayne	Parkway Field; Louisville, KY	W 72–0		
October 8		Dayton	Parkway Field; Louisville, KY	W 19–7		
October 15	2:30 p.m.	at Evansville	Reitz Bowl; Evansville, IN	W 29–7	3,500	
October 29		Western Kentucky	Parkway Field; Louisville, KY	W 20–0		
November 5		Morehead State	Parkway Field; Louisville, KY	W 37–12		
November 12		at Eastern Kentucky	Richmond, KY	W 45–13		
November 19		Toledo	Parkway Field; Louisville, KY	W 33–13		
All times are in Eastern time
