= 1955 Delaware Fightin' Blue Hens football team =

American college football season

1955 Delaware Fightin' Blue Hens football
- Conference: Independent
- Record: 8–1
- Head coach: David M. Nelson (5th season)
- Captain: Vincent Grande
- Home stadium: Delaware Stadium

1955 Southern college football independents records
	Conf.			Overall
Team	W	L	T	W		L		T
Centre		–		8	–	0	–	0
Mississippi Southern		–		9	–	1	–	0
Delaware		–		8	–	1	–	0
Louisville		–		7	–	2	–	0
Tampa		–		7	–	2	–	0
No. 18 Navy		–		6	–	2	–	1
Arkansas State		–		6	–	3	–	0
No. 14 Miami (FL)		–		6	–	3	–	0
Chattanooga		–		5	–	4	–	1
Florida State		–		5	–	5	–	0
Memphis State		–		2	–	7	–	0
Howard (AL)		–		1	–	8	–	0
Sewanee		–		1	–	8	–	0
Rankings from AP Poll

The 1955 Delaware Fightin' Blue Hens football team was an American football team that represented the University of Delaware as an independent during the 1955 college football season. In its fifth season under head coach David M. Nelson, the team compiled an 8–1 record and outscored opponents by a total of 261 to 82. Vincent Grande was the team captain.

The Blue Hens tallied 2,302 rushing yards and 730 passing yards. On defense, they held opponents to 829 rushing yards and 636 passing yards. The team's individual leaders included:

- Halfback Jimmy Zaiser led the team in rushing (613 yards, 124 carries, 4.94-yard average), scoring (60 points, 10 touchdowns), and kickoff returns, and also ranked third in both passing and pass receiving. He was selected by the Associated Press (AP) as a second-team player on the 1955 Little All-America college football team.
- Quarterback Bob Hooper completed 47 of 95 passes for 665 yards, nine touchdowns, and four interceptions. He played on defense as well and led the team with three interceptions for 43 yards. He also ranked second in scoring with 43 points on four touchdowns and 19 points after touchdown.
- End Warren Allen was the team's leading receiver with 15 catches for 242 yards and four touchdowns. Team captain Vince Grande ranked second with 12 receptions for 187 yards.

Delaware was ranked at No. 67 in the final Litkenhous Ratings for 1955.

The team played its home games at Delaware Stadium in Newark, Delaware.

== Schedule ==
Date	Opponent	Site	Result	Attendance	Source
September 24	NTS Bainbridge	Delaware Stadium; Newark, DE	W 46–6	6,925	
October 1	Lehigh	Delaware Stadium; Newark, DE (rivalry)	L 13–19	5,600	
October 8	at Lafayette	Fisher Field; Easton, PA	W 14–6	5,000	
October 15	New Hampshire^{†}	Delaware Stadium; Newark, DE	W 20–18	6,500	
October 22	at Connecticut	Delaware Stadium; Newark, DE	W 26–14	7,200	
October 29	at Rutgers	Rutgers Stadium; Piscataway, NJ	W 33–7	7,000	
November 5	Gettysburg	Delaware Stadium; Newark, DE	W 36–0	7,000	
November 12	at Temple	Temple Stadium; Philadelphia, PA	W 46–0	5,000	
November 19	at Bucknell	Memorial Stadium; Lewisburg, PA	W 27–12	2,175	
^{†}Homecoming
