= 1955 Chattanooga Moccasins football team =

American college football season

1955 Chattanooga Moccasins football
- Conference: Independent
- Record: 5–4–1
- Head coach: Scrappy Moore (25th season)
- Captain: Larry Doak
- Home stadium: Chamberlain Field

1955 Southern college football independents records
	Conf.			Overall
Team	W	L	T	W		L		T
Centre		–		8	–	0	–	0
Mississippi Southern		–		9	–	1	–	0
Delaware		–		8	–	1	–	0
Louisville		–		7	–	2	–	0
Tampa		–		7	–	2	–	0
No. 18 Navy		–		6	–	2	–	1
Arkansas State		–		6	–	3	–	0
No. 14 Miami (FL)		–		6	–	3	–	0
Chattanooga		–		5	–	4	–	1
Florida State		–		5	–	5	–	0
Memphis State		–		2	–	7	–	0
Howard (AL)		–		1	–	8	–	0
Sewanee		–		1	–	8	–	0
Rankings from AP Poll

The 1955 Chattanooga Moccasins football team was an American football team that represented the University of Chattanooga (now known as the University of Tennessee at Chattanooga) during the 1955 college football season. In their 25th year under head coach Scrappy Moore, the team compiled a 5–4–1 record.

== Schedule ==
Date	Opponent	Site	Result	Attendance	Source
September 16	Jacksonville State	Chamberlain Field; Chattanooga, TN	L 0–12		
September 24	at Auburn	Cliff Hare Stadium; Auburn, AL	L 6–15	15,000	
September 30	Mississippi Southern	Chamberlain Field; Chattanooga, TN	W 10–0	6,800	
October 8	at Tennessee	Shields–Watkins Field; Knoxville, TN	L 0–13	13,500	
October 14	Vanderbilt	Chamberlain Field; Chattanooga, TN	L 0–12	8,500	
October 21	Abilene Christian^{†}	Chamberlain Field; Chattanooga, TN	W 7–6	6,300	
October 29	at Dayton	UD Stadium; Dayton, OH	T 7–7	7,158	
November 5	at North Texas State	Fouts Field; Denton, TX	W 14–6	10,000	
November 11	Parris Island Marines	Chamberlain Field; Chattanooga, TN	W 26–13	4,500	
November 24	Memphis State	Chamberlain Field; Chattanooga, TN	W 25–7	6,500	
^{†}Homecoming
