= 1955 North Dakota State Bison football team =

American college football season

1955 North Dakota State Bison football
- Conference: North Central Conference
- Record: 0–9 (0–6 NCC)
- Head coach: Del Anderson (2nd season)
- Home stadium: Dacotah Field

1955 North Central Conference football standings
| | Conf. | | | | | Overall |
| Team | W | | L | | T | W | | L | | T |
|---|---|---|---|---|---|---|---|---|---|---|
| South Dakota State $ | 5 | – | 0 | – | 1 | 6 | – | 2 | – | 1 |
| Iowa State Teachers | 5 | – | 1 | – | 0 | 8 | – | 1 | – | 0 |
| Morningside | 3 | – | 2 | – | 1 | 4 | – | 3 | – | 1 |
| North Dakota | 3 | – | 3 | – | 0 | 6 | – | 3 | – | 0 |
| South Dakota | 3 | – | 3 | – | 0 | 4 | – | 4 | – | 0 |
| Augustana (SD) | 1 | – | 5 | – | 0 | 2 | – | 6 | – | 1 |
| North Dakota State | 0 | – | 6 | – | 0 | 0 | – | 9 | – | 0 |
$ – Conference champion

The 1955 North Dakota State Bison football team was an American football team that represented North Dakota State University during the 1955 college football season as a member of the North Central Conference. In their second year under head coach Del Anderson, the team compiled a 0–9 record.

== Schedule ==
| Date | Opponent | Site | Result | Attendance | Source |
|---|---|---|---|---|---|
| September 12 | Concordia–Moorhead* | Dacotah Field; Fargo, ND | L 7–20 | | |
| September 16 | at Drake* | Drake Stadium; Des Moines, IA | L 6–28 | | |
| October 1 | at Morningside | Public School Stadium; Sioux City, IA | L 7–26 | | |
| October 8 | Iowa State Teachers | Dacotah Field; Fargo, ND | L 0–32 | | |
| October 15 | South Dakota | Dacotah Field; Fargo, ND | L 28–45 | | |
| October 22 | at South Dakota State | State Field; Brookings, SD (rivalry) | L 7–33 | | |
| October 29 | North Dakota^{†} | Dacotah Field; Fargo, ND (Nickel Trophy) | L 0–21 | | |
| November 5 | at Augustana (SD) | Viking Stadium; Sioux Falls, SD | L 0–13 | | |
| November 12 | at Mississippi Southern* | Faulkner Field; Hattiesburg, MS | L 0–58 | 9,000 | |
*Non-conference game; ^{†}Homecoming
