= 1955 Arkansas State Indians football team =

American college football season

1955 Arkansas State Indians football
- Conference: Independent
- Record: 6–3
- Head coach: Gene Harlow (1st season)
- Home stadium: Kays Stadium

1955 Southern college football independents records
	Conf.			Overall
Team	W	L	T	W		L		T
Centre		–		8	–	0	–	0
Mississippi Southern		–		9	–	1	–	0
Delaware		–		8	–	1	–	0
Louisville		–		7	–	2	–	0
Tampa		–		7	–	2	–	0
No. 18 Navy		–		6	–	2	–	1
Arkansas State		–		6	–	3	–	0
No. 14 Miami (FL)		–		6	–	3	–	0
Chattanooga		–		5	–	4	–	1
Florida State		–		5	–	5	–	0
Memphis State		–		2	–	7	–	0
Howard (AL)		–		1	–	8	–	0
Sewanee		–		1	–	8	–	0
Rankings from AP Poll

The 1955 Arkansas State Indians football team represented Arkansas State College—now known as Arkansas State University—as an independent during the 1955 college football season. Led by first-year head coach Gene Harlow, the Indians compiled a record of 6–3.

== Schedule ==
Date	Opponent	Site	Result	Source
September 24	Lewis (IL)	Kays Stadium; Jonesboro, AR	W 41–6	
October 8	Florence State	Kays Stadium; Jonesboro, AR	L 7–12	
October 15	Murray State	Kays Stadium; Jonesboro, AR	L 6–13	
October 22	at Southeastern Louisiana	Strawberry Stadium; Hammond, LA	W 21–12	
October 29	at Memphis State	Crump Stadium; Memphis, TN (rivalry)	W 21–20	
November 5	at Austin	Sherman, TX	W 40–19	
November 12	at Tennessee Tech	Overall Field; Cookeville, TN	W 27–20	
November 19	at Austin Peay	Municipal Stadium; Clarksville, TN	L 6–19	
November 24	Arkansas Tech	Kays Stadium; Jonesboro, AR	W 33–6	
