= 1955 Abilene Christian Wildcats football team =

American college football season

1955 Abilene Christian Wildcats football

GCC co-champion
- Conference: Gulf Coast Conference
- Record: 3–5–2 (2–1 GCC)
- Head coach: Garvin Beauchamp (6th season)
- Captains: Paul Goad; Lanny Henninger
- Home stadium: Fair Park Stadium

1955 Gulf Coast Conference football standings
	Conf.					Overall
Team	W		L		T	W		L		T
North Texas State +	2	–	1	–	0	5	–	4	–	1
Abilene Christian +	2	–	1	–	0	3	–	5	–	2
Trinity (TX)	1	–	2	–	0	5	–	4	–	0
Midwestern (TX)	0	–	3	–	0	2	–	8	–	0
+ – Conference co-champions; North Texas State's loss to Chattanooga and Abilene Christian's loss to Mississippi Southern counted in the conference standings.

The 1955 Abilene Christian Wildcats football team represented Abilene Christian College—now known as Abilene Christian University—as a member of the Gulf Coast Conference (GCC) during the 1955 college football season. Led by Garvin Beauchamp in his sixth and final season as head coach, the Wildcats compiled an overall record of 3–5–2 with a mark of 2–1 in conference play, sharing the GCC title with North Texas State. Abilene Christian's game against Mississippi Southern on November 5 counted in the conference standings even though Mississippi Southern was not a member of the GCC.

== Schedule ==
Date	Time	Opponent	Site	Result	Attendance	Source
September 17		Trinity (TX)	Fair Park Stadium; Abilene, TX	W 14–13	7,000	
September 24	8:00 p.m.	at East Texas State*	Memorial Stadium; Commerce, TX	T 7–7	6,000	
October 1		at Louisiana Tech*	Tech Stadium; Ruston, LA	L 7–21		
October 15	8:00 p.m.	McMurry*	Fair Park Stadium; Abilene, TX	L 6–13	8,000	
October 21		at Chattanooga*	Chamberlain Field; Chattanooga, TN	L 6–7	6,300	
October 29		at Southwest Texas State*	Evans Field; San Marcos, TX	T 19–19		
November 5	2:30 p.m.	Mississippi Southern^{†}	Fair Park Stadium; Abilene, TX	L 0–40	7,000	
November 12	2:00 p.m.	at Midwestern (TX)	Midwestern Stadium; Wichita Falls, TX	W 26–21		
November 19		Youngstown State*	Fair Park Stadium; Abilene, TX	W 25–12	4,000	
November 24	2:00 p.m.	at Howard Payne*	Lion Stadium; Brownwood, TX	L 6–21		
*Non-conference game; ^{†}Homecoming; All times are in Central time
