= 1955 Navy Midshipmen football team =

American college football season

1955 Navy Midshipmen football
- Conference: Independent

Ranking
- Coaches: No. 20
- AP: No. 18
- Record: 6–2–1
- Head coach: Eddie Erdelatz (6th season)
- Captain: Phil Monahan
- Home stadium: Thompson Stadium

1955 Southern college football independents records
	Conf.			Overall
Team	W	L	T	W		L		T
Centre		–		8	–	0	–	0
Mississippi Southern		–		9	–	1	–	0
Delaware		–		8	–	1	–	0
Louisville		–		7	–	2	–	0
Tampa		–		7	–	2	–	0
No. 18 Navy		–		6	–	2	–	1
Arkansas State		–		6	–	3	–	0
No. 14 Miami (FL)		–		6	–	3	–	0
Chattanooga		–		5	–	4	–	1
Florida State		–		5	–	5	–	0
Memphis State		–		2	–	7	–	0
Howard (AL)		–		1	–	8	–	0
Sewanee		–		1	–	8	–	0
Rankings from AP Poll

The 1955 Navy Midshipmen football team represented the United States Naval Academy (USNA) as an independent during the 1955 college football season. They began the season ranked No. 8 in the pre-season AP Poll. The team was led by sixth-year head coach Eddie Erdelatz.

== Schedule ==
Date	Time	Opponent	Rank	Site	TV	Result	Attendance	Source
September 24		William & Mary^{†}	No. 9	Thompson Stadium; Annapolis, MD		W 7–0	14,000	
October 1		at South Carolina	No. 15	Carolina Stadium; Columbia, SC		W 26–0	28,000	
October 8		vs. Pittsburgh	No. 12	Memorial Stadium; Baltimore, MD		W 21–0	13,229–20,000	
October 15		at Penn State	No. 8	New Beaver Field; University Park, PA		W 34–14	32,209–33,112	
October 22		at Penn	No. 4	Franklin Field; Philadelphia, PA		W 33–0	34,543	
October 29		at No. 9 Notre Dame	No. 4	Notre Dame Stadium; Notre Dame, IN (rivalry)		L 7–21	59,475	
November 5		vs. Duke	No. 9	Memorial Stadium; Baltimore, MD		T 7–7	27,119	
November 12		at Columbia	No. 13	Baker Field; New York, NY	NBC	W 47–0	28,000	
November 26	1:15 p.m.	vs. Army	No. 11	Philadelphia Municipal Stadium; Philadelphia, PA (Army–Navy Game)	NBC	L 6–14	102,000	
^{†}Homecoming; Rankings from AP Poll released prior to the game; All times are in Eastern time; Source:

== Roster ==
- QB George Welsh, Sr.
