= 1955 South Dakota State Jackrabbits football team =

American college football season

1955 South Dakota State Jackrabbits football

NCC champion
- Conference: North Central Conference
- Record: 6–2–1 (5–0–1 NCC)
- Head coach: Ralph Ginn (9th season)
- Home stadium: State Field

1955 North Central Conference football standings
	Conf.					Overall
Team	W		L		T	W		L		T
South Dakota State $	5	–	0	–	1	6	–	2	–	1
Iowa State Teachers	5	–	1	–	0	8	–	1	–	0
Morningside	3	–	2	–	1	4	–	3	–	1
North Dakota	3	–	3	–	0	6	–	3	–	0
South Dakota	3	–	3	–	0	4	–	4	–	0
Augustana (SD)	1	–	5	–	0	2	–	6	–	1
North Dakota State	0	–	6	–	0	0	–	9	–	0
$ – Conference champion

The 1955 South Dakota State Jackrabbits football team was an American football team that represented South Dakota State University in the North Central Conference (NCC) during the 1955 college football season. In its ninth season under head coach Ralph Ginn, the team compiled a 6–2–1 record, won the NCC championship, and outscored opponents by a total of 197 to 114.

The team's statistical leaders included Bob Betz with 725 rushing yards and Dick Steiner with 483 passing yards. Other key players included end Jerry Acheson, tackle Harwood Hoeft, guard Len Spanjers, center Dick Lawitter, and back Larry "Bubb" Korver.

== Schedule ==
Date	Opponent	Site	Result	Attendance	Source
September 17	St. Thomas (MN)*	State Field; Brookings, SD	L 13–19		
September 24	Iowa State Teachers	State Field; Brookings, SD	W 34–21		
October 1	at North Dakota	Grand Forks, ND	W 14–6		
October 8	at Augustana (SD)	Viking Stadium; Sioux Falls, SD	W 28–0		
October 15	Wichita*	State Field; Brookings, SD	L 7–33	4,500	
October 22	North Dakota State	State Field; Brookings, SD (rivalry)	W 33–7		
October 29	South Dakota	State Field; Brookings, SD (rivalry)	W 27–7	10,000	
November 5	at Morningside	Public Schools Stadium; Sioux City, IA	T 21–21		
November 12	at La Crosse State*	Memorial Stadium; La Crosse, WI	W 20–0		
*Non-conference game
