= 1955 North Dakota Fighting Sioux football team =

American college football season

1955 North Dakota Fighting Sioux football
- Conference: North Central Conference
- Record: 6–3 (3–3 NCC)
- Head coach: Frank Zazula (6th season)
- Home stadium: Memorial Stadium

1955 North Central Conference football standings
	Conf.					Overall
Team	W		L		T	W		L		T
South Dakota State $	5	–	0	–	1	6	–	2	–	1
Iowa State Teachers	5	–	1	–	0	8	–	1	–	0
Morningside	3	–	2	–	1	4	–	3	–	1
North Dakota	3	–	3	–	0	6	–	3	–	0
South Dakota	3	–	3	–	0	4	–	4	–	0
Augustana (SD)	1	–	5	–	0	2	–	6	–	1
North Dakota State	0	–	6	–	0	0	–	9	–	0
$ – Conference champion

The 1955 North Dakota Fighting Sioux football team, also known as the Nodaks, was an American football team that represented the University of North Dakota in the North Central Conference (NCC) during the 1955 college football season. In its sixth year under head coach Frank Zazula, the team compiled a 6–3 record (3–3 against NCC opponents), tied for fourth place out of seven teams in the NCC, and outscored opponents by a total of 183 to 86. The team played its home games at Memorial Stadium in Grand Forks, North Dakota.

== Schedule ==
Date	Opponent	Site	Result	Attendance	Source
September 17	Hamline*	Memorial Stadium; Grand Forks, ND	W 27–0		
September 24	Augustana (SD)	Memorial Stadium; Grand Forks, ND	W 32–19		
October 1	South Dakota State	Memorial Stadium; Grand Forks, ND	L 6–14		
October 8	Morningside	Memorial Stadium; Grand Forks, ND	L 7–13		
October 15	at Iowa State Teachers	O. R. Latham Stadium; Cedar Falls, IA	L 7–13		
October 22	Moorhead State*	Memorial Stadium; Grand Forks, ND	W 39–0		
October 29	at North Dakota State	Dacotah Field; Fargo, ND (rivalry)	W 21–0		
November 4	at Superior State*	Superior, WI	W 26–13		
November 12	at South Dakota	Inman Field; Vermillion, SD (rivalry)	W 18–14		
*Non-conference game

== After the season ==
The following Fighting Sioux was selected in the 1956 NFL draft after the season.

Round	Pick	Player	Position	NFL club
12	139	Steve Myhra	Guard	Baltimore Colts
