= 1955 Centre Colonels football team =

American college football season

1955 Centre Colonels football
- Conference: Independent
- Record: 8–0
- Head coach: T. Briscoe Inman (4th season)

1955 Southern college football independents records
	Conf.			Overall
Team	W	L	T	W		L		T
Centre		–		8	–	0	–	0
Mississippi Southern		–		9	–	1	–	0
Delaware		–		8	–	1	–	0
Louisville		–		7	–	2	–	0
Tampa		–		7	–	2	–	0
No. 18 Navy		–		6	–	2	–	1
Arkansas State		–		6	–	3	–	0
No. 14 Miami (FL)		–		6	–	3	–	0
Chattanooga		–		5	–	4	–	1
Florida State		–		5	–	5	–	0
Memphis State		–		2	–	7	–	0
Howard (AL)		–		1	–	8	–	0
Sewanee		–		1	–	8	–	0
Rankings from AP Poll

The 1955 Centre Colonels football team was an American football team that represented Centre College as an independent during the 1955 college football season. In their fourth year under head coach T. Briscoe Inman, the Colonels compiled a perfect 8–0 record and outscored opponents by a total of 245 to 53. It was Centre's first perfect season since the 1919 team went 9–0. No Centre team has compiled a perfect season since 1955.

== Schedule ==
Date	Opponent	Site	Result	Attendance	Source
September 17	Otterbein	Danville, KY	W 28–13	1,500	
October 1	at Maryville (TN)	Maryville, TN	W 17–0		
October 8	at Washington and Lee	Lexington, VA	W 24–7		
October 15	Southwestern (TN)^{†}	Danville, KY	W 28–13	3,000	
October 22	Georgetown (KY)	Danville, KY	W 53–0		
October 29	at Hanover	Hanover, IN	W 27–13		
November 5	Sewanee	Danville, KY	W 28–0		
November 12	at Washington & Jefferson	Washington, PA	W 40–7		
^{†}Homecoming
