= 1955 Memphis State Tigers football team =

American college football season

1955 Memphis State Tigers football
- Conference: Independent
- Record: 2–7
- Head coach: Ralph Hatley (9th season)
- Home stadium: Crump Stadium

1955 Southern college football independents records
	Conf.			Overall
Team	W	L	T	W		L		T
Centre		–		8	–	0	–	0
Mississippi Southern		–		9	–	1	–	0
Delaware		–		8	–	1	–	0
Louisville		–		7	–	2	–	0
Tampa		–		7	–	2	–	0
No. 18 Navy		–		6	–	2	–	1
Arkansas State		–		6	–	3	–	0
No. 14 Miami (FL)		–		6	–	3	–	0
Chattanooga		–		5	–	4	–	1
Florida State		–		5	–	5	–	0
Memphis State		–		2	–	7	–	0
Howard (AL)		–		1	–	8	–	0
Sewanee		–		1	–	8	–	0
Rankings from AP Poll

The 1955 Memphis State Tigers football team was an American football team that represented Memphis State College (now known as the University of Memphis) as an independent during the 1955 college football season. In their ninth season under head coach Ralph Hatley, Memphis State compiled a 2–7 record.

== Schedule ==
Date	Opponent	Site	Result	Attendance	Source
September 24	Trinity (TX)	Crump Stadium; Memphis, TN	L 0–6		
October 1	at Mississippi State	Scott Field; Starkville, MS	L 0–33		
October 8	at Murray State	Cutchin Stadium; Murray, KY	W 20–7		
October 15	Tennessee Tech	Crump Stadium; Memphis, TN	W 20–12		
October 21	Mississippi Southern	Crump Stadium; Memphis, TN (rivalry)	L 14–34	9,189	
October 29	Arkansas State	Crump Stadium; Memphis, TN (rivalry)	L 20–21		
November 5	No. 15 Ole Miss	Crump Stadium; Memphis, TN (rivalry)	L 6–39		
November 12	at Kentucky	Stoll Field; Lexington, KY	L 7–41		
November 24	at Chattanooga	Chamberlain Field; Chattanooga, TN	L 7–25	6,500	
Rankings from AP Poll released prior to the game
