= 1955 Miami Hurricanes football team =

American college football season

1955 Miami Hurricanes football
- Conference: Independent

Ranking
- Coaches: No. 18
- AP: No. 14
- Record: 6–3
- Head coach: Andy Gustafson (8th season)
- Home stadium: Burdine Stadium

1955 Southern college football independents records
	Conf.			Overall
Team	W	L	T	W		L		T
Centre		–		8	–	0	–	0
Mississippi Southern		–		9	–	1	–	0
Delaware		–		8	–	1	–	0
Louisville		–		7	–	2	–	0
Tampa		–		7	–	2	–	0
No. 18 Navy		–		6	–	2	–	1
Arkansas State		–		6	–	3	–	0
No. 14 Miami (FL)		–		6	–	3	–	0
Chattanooga		–		5	–	4	–	1
Florida State		–		5	–	5	–	0
Memphis State		–		2	–	7	–	0
Howard (AL)		–		1	–	8	–	0
Sewanee		–		1	–	8	–	0
Rankings from AP Poll

The 1955 Miami Hurricanes football team represented the University of Miami as an independent during the 1955 college football season. Led by eighth-year head coach Andy Gustafson, the Hurricanes played their home games at Burdine Stadium in Miami, Florida. Miami finished the season 6–3.

== Schedule ==
Date	Opponent	Rank	Site	TV	Result	Attendance	Source
September 17	at No. 10 Georgia Tech	No. 9	Grant Field; Atlanta, GA	NBC	L 6–14	39,500	
September 30	Florida State		Burdine Stadium; Miami, FL (rivalry)		W 34–0	42,363	
October 7	No. 5 Notre Dame	No. 15	Burdine Stadium; Miami, FL (rivalry)		L 0–14	75,685	
October 21	No. 18 TCU		Burdine Stadium; Miami, FL		L 19–21	44,045	
October 29	at No. 16 Pittsburgh		Pitt Stadium; Pittsburgh, PA		W 21–7	37,230–40,117	
November 4	Boston College		Burdine Stadium; Miami, FL		W 14–7	42,249	
November 11	Bucknell	No. 20	Burdine Stadium; Miami, FL		W 46–0	30,240	
November 18	Alabama		Burdine Stadium; Miami, FL		W 34–12	35,414	
November 26	Florida	No. 14	Burdine Stadium; Miami, FL (rivalry)		W 7–6	49,362	
Rankings from AP Poll released prior to the game
