= 1955 North Texas State Eagles football team =

American college football season

1955 North Texas State Eagles football

GCC co-champion
- Conference: Gulf Coast Conference
- Record: 5–4–1 (2–1 GCC)
- Head coach: Odus Mitchell (10th season)
- Home stadium: Fouts Field

1955 Gulf Coast Conference football standings
	Conf.					Overall
Team	W		L		T	W		L		T
North Texas State +	2	–	1	–	0	5	–	4	–	1
Abilene Christian +	2	–	1	–	0	3	–	5	–	2
Trinity (TX)	1	–	2	–	0	5	–	4	–	0
Midwestern (TX)	0	–	3	–	0	2	–	8	–	0
+ – Conference co-champions; North Texas State's loss to Chattanooga and Abilene Christian's loss to Mississippi Southern counted in the conference standings.

The 1955 North Texas State Eagles football team represented North Texas State College—now known as the University of North Texas—as a member of the Gulf Coast Conference (GCC) during the 1955 college football season. Led by tenth-year head coach Odus Mitchell, the Eagles compiled an overall record of 5–4–1 with a mark of 2–1 in conference play, sharing the GCC title with Abilene Christian. North Texas State's game against Chattanooga on November 5 counted in the conference standings even though Chattanooga was not a member of the GCC.

== Schedule ==
Date	Time	Opponent	Site	Result	Attendance	Source
September 24		at Texas Western*	Kidd Field; El Paso, TX	T 7–7	10,000	
October 1		at Ole Miss*	Hemingway Stadium; Oxford, MS	L 0–33		
October 8		at Mississippi Southern*	Faulkner Field; Hattiesburg, MS	L 0–26	12,500	
October 15	8:00 p.m.	vs. Hardin–Simmons*	Broncho Stadium; Odessa, TX	W 30–19	2,500	
October 22		Midwestern (TX)	Fouts Field; Denton, TX	W 40–13		
October 29		at Mississippi State*	Scott Field; Starkville, MS	L 7–20	13,000	
November 5		Chattanooga^{†}	Fouts Field; Denton, TX	L 6–14	10,000	
November 12	8:00 p.m.	McMurry*	Fouts Field; Denton, TX	W 38–21		
November 19		Emporia State*	Fouts Field; Denton, TX	W 62–0		
December 3		Trinity (TX)	Fouts Field; Denton, TX	W 7–6		
*Non-conference game; ^{†}Homecoming; All times are in Central time
