= 1955 Iowa State Teachers Panthers football team =

American college football season

1955 Iowa State Teachers Panthers football
- Conference: North Central Conference
- Record: 8–1 (5–1 NCC)
- Head coach: Clyde Starbeck (18th season)
- Home stadium: O. R. Latham Stadium

1955 North Central Conference football standings
	Conf.					Overall
Team	W		L		T	W		L		T
South Dakota State $	5	–	0	–	1	6	–	2	–	1
Iowa State Teachers	5	–	1	–	0	8	–	1	–	0
Morningside	3	–	2	–	1	4	–	3	–	1
North Dakota	3	–	3	–	0	6	–	3	–	0
South Dakota	3	–	3	–	0	4	–	4	–	0
Augustana (SD)	1	–	5	–	0	2	–	6	–	1
North Dakota State	0	–	6	–	0	0	–	9	–	0
$ – Conference champion

The 1955 Iowa State Teachers Panthers football team was an American football team that represented Iowa State Teachers College (later renamed University of Northern Iowa) in the North Central Conference during the 1955 college football season. In their 18th season under head coach Clyde Starbeck, the team compiled an 8–1 record (5–1 against NCC opponents) and finished in second place in the NCC.

== Schedule ==
Date	Opponent	Site	Result	Attendance	Source
September 17	Hastings*	O. R. Latham Field; Cedar Falls, IA	W 26–7		
September 24	at South Dakota State	Brookings, SD	L 21–34		
September 30	at Drake*	Drake Stadium; Des Moines, IA	W 21–14	4,000	
October 8	at North Dakota State	Dacotah Field; Fargo, ND	W 32–0		
October 15	North Dakota	O. R. Latham Field; Cedar Falls, IA	W 13–7		
October 22	Augustana (SD)	O. R. Latham Field; Cedar Falls, IA	W 28–7		
October 29	Morningside^{†}	O. R. Latham Field; Cedar Falls, IA	W 13–12	6,000	
November 5	at South Dakota	Vermillion, SD	W 33–26		
November 12	Mankato State*	O. R. Latham Field; Cedar Falls, IA	W 33–7	1,100	
*Non-conference game; ^{†}Homecoming
