= 1955 Mississippi Southern Southerners football team =

American college football season

1955 Mississippi Southern Southerners football
- Conference: Independent
- Record: 9–1
- Head coach: Thad Vann (7th season)
- Home stadium: Faulkner Field

1955 Southern college football independents records
	Conf.			Overall
Team	W	L	T	W		L		T
Centre		–		8	–	0	–	0
Mississippi Southern		–		9	–	1	–	0
Delaware		–		8	–	1	–	0
Louisville		–		7	–	2	–	0
Tampa		–		7	–	2	–	0
No. 18 Navy		–		6	–	2	–	1
Arkansas State		–		6	–	3	–	0
No. 14 Miami (FL)		–		6	–	3	–	0
Chattanooga		–		5	–	4	–	1
Florida State		–		5	–	5	–	0
Memphis State		–		2	–	7	–	0
Howard (AL)		–		1	–	8	–	0
Sewanee		–		1	–	8	–	0
Rankings from AP Poll

The 1955 Mississippi Southern Southerners football team was an American football team that represented Mississippi Southern College (now known as the University of Southern Mississippi) as an independent during the 1955 college football season. In their seventh year under head coach Thad Vann, the team compiled a 9–1 record.

== Schedule ==
Date	Time	Opponent	Site	Result	Attendance	Source
September 17		Elon	Faulkner Field; Hattiesburg, MS	W 39–0	8,000	
September 24		at Louisiana Tech	Tech Stadium; Ruston, LA (rivalry)	W 7–6	7,500	
September 30		at Chattanooga	Chamberlain Field; Chattanooga, TN	L 0–10	6,800	
October 8		North Texas State^{†}	Faulkner Field; Hattiesburg, MS	W 26–0	12,500	
October 15		at Southeastern Louisiana	Strawberry Stadium; Hammond, LA	W 33–0	8,000	
October 21		at Memphis State	Crump Stadium; Memphis, TN (rivalry)	W 34–14	9,189	
November 5	2:30 p.m.	at Abilene Christian	Fair Park Stadium; Abilene, TX	W 40–0	7,000	
November 12		North Dakota State	Faulkner Field; Hattiesburg, MS	W 58–0	9,000	
November 19		Dayton	Mississippi Veterans Memorial Stadium; Jackson, MS	W 19–13	6,500	
November 25		Florida State	Faulkner Field; Hattiesburg, MS	W 21–6	7,000	
^{†}Homecoming; All times are in Central time

== After the season ==
=== NFL draft ===
The following Southerners were selected in the 1956 NFL draft after the season.

Round	Pick	Player	Position	NFL team
16	184	George Herring	Quarterback	San Francisco 49ers
