= 1955 Whitworth Pirates football team =

College football season

1955 Whitworth Pirates football

Evergreen champion
- Conference: Evergreen Conference
- Record: 9–0 (6–0 Evergreen)
- Head coach: James Lounsberry (4th season)

1955 Evergreen Conference football standings
	Conf.					Overall
Team	W		L		T	W		L		T
Whitworth $	6	–	0	–	0	9	–	0	–	0
Pacific Lutheran	5	–	1	–	0	5	–	3	–	0
Puget Sound	4	–	2	–	0	6	–	2	–	0
Eastern Washington	3	–	3	–	0	4	–	4	–	0
Central Washington	2	–	4	–	0	2	–	6	–	0
UBC	1	–	5	–	0	?	–	?	–	?
Western Washington	0	–	6	–	0	1	–	7	–	0
$ – Conference champion

The 1955 Whitworth Pirates football team was an American football team represented Whitworth University of Spokane, Washington, as a member of the Evergreen Conference during the 1955 college football season. In their fourth year under head coach James Lounsberry, the Pirates compiled a perfect 9–0 record (6–0 against conference opponents), won the Evergreen Conference championship, and outscored opponents by a total of 185 to 34.

Between November 14, 1953, and September 29, 1956, the Pirates won 21 consecutive games, including back-to-back perfect seasons in 1954 and 1955.

== Schedule ==
Date	Opponent	Site	Result	Attendance	Source
September 24	at Willamette*	Salem, OR	W 13–7		
October 1	at Western Washington	Girard Street lot; Bellingham, WA	W 13–0		
October 8	at Central Washington	Ellensburg, WA	W 21–6		
October 15	Puget Sound	Memorial Stadium; Spokane, WA	W 19–6	6,000	
October 22	UBC	Pine Bowl; Spokane, WA	W 48–0	> 4,000	
November 5	at Pacific Lutheran	Tacoma, WA	W 19–9		
November 12	Eastern Washington	Memorial Stadium; Spokane, WA	W 25–0	1,500	
November 19	Montana State*	Spokane, WA	W 20–0	< 1,000	
November 24	at College of Idaho*	Boise, ID	W 7–6		
*Non-conference game
