= 1955 Southeast Missouri State Indians football team =

American college football season

1955 Southeast Missouri State Indians football

MIAA champion
- Conference: Missouri Intercollegiate Athletics Association
- Record: 9–0 (5–0 MIAA)
- Head coach: Kenneth Knox (4th season)
- Home stadium: Houck Stadium

1955 Missouri Intercollegiate Athletic Association football standings
	Conf.					Overall
Team	W		L		T	W		L		T
SE Missouri State $	5	–	0	–	0	9	–	0	–	0
Central Missouri State	4	–	1	–	0	5	–	4	–	0
Missouri–Rolla	2	–	3	–	0	4	–	5	–	0
NW Missouri State	2	–	3	–	0	2	–	5	–	1
NE Missouri State	1	–	4	–	0	3	–	5	–	0
SW Missouri State	1	–	4	–	0	2	–	6	–	1
$ – Conference champion

The 1955 Southeast Missouri State Indians football team was an American football team that represented Southeast Missouri State College—now known as Southeast Missouri State University— in the 1955 college football season as a member of the Missouri Intercollegiate Athletics Association (MIAA). Led by Kenneth Knox in his fourth season as head coach, the team compiled a perfect record of 9–0, winning MIAA title with a 5–0 mark.

== Schedule ==
Date	Opponent	Site	Result	Attendance	Source
September 17	Southern Illinois*	Houck Stadium; Cape Girardeau, MO	W 7–0	4,200	
September 24	Central Arkansas*	Houck Stadium; Cape Girardeau, MO	W 21–7		
October 1	Henderson State*	Houck Stadium; Cape Girardeau, MO	W 18–6		
October 8	at Northwest Missouri State	Memorial Stadium; Maryville, MO	W 31–7		
October 15	at Missouri–Rolla	Rolla, MO	W 9–6		
October 21	Southwest Missouri State	Houck Stadium; Cape Girardeau, MO	W 14–0		
October 29	at Central Missouri State	Vernon Kennedy Field; Warrensburg, MO	W 13–12		
November 5	Northeast Missouri State	Houck Stadium; Cape Girardeau, MO	W 39–14		
November 19	at Delta State*	Cleveland, MS	W 24–7		
*Non-conference game
