= 1955 Tampa Spartans football team =

American college football season

1955 Tampa Spartans football
- Conference: Independent
- Record: 7–2
- Head coach: Marcelino Huerta (4th season)
- Home stadium: Phillips Field

1955 Southern college football independents records
	Conf.			Overall
Team	W	L	T	W		L		T
Centre		–		8	–	0	–	0
Mississippi Southern		–		9	–	1	–	0
Delaware		–		8	–	1	–	0
Louisville		–		7	–	2	–	0
Tampa		–		7	–	2	–	0
No. 18 Navy		–		6	–	2	–	1
Arkansas State		–		6	–	3	–	0
No. 14 Miami (FL)		–		6	–	3	–	0
Chattanooga		–		5	–	4	–	1
Florida State		–		5	–	5	–	0
Memphis State		–		2	–	7	–	0
Howard (AL)		–		1	–	8	–	0
Sewanee		–		1	–	8	–	0
Rankings from AP Poll

The 1955 Tampa Spartans football team represented the University of Tampa in the 1955 college football season. It was the Spartans' 19th season. The team was led by head coach Marcelino Huerta, in his fourth year, and played their home games at Phillips Field in Tampa, Florida. They finished with a record of seven wins and two losses (7–2).

== Schedule ==
Date	Opponent	Site	Result	Attendance	Source
September 24	at Morris Harvey	Oakes Field; South Charleston, WV	W 12–7		
October 1	Troy State	Phillips Field; Tampa, FL	W 38–0		
October 8	Southeastern Louisiana	Phillips Field; Tampa, FL	L 7–13		
October 15	at Stetson	DeLand Municipal Stadium; DeLand, FL	W 40–13		
October 22	Livingston State	Phillips Field; Tampa, FL	W 51–7		
November 5	at East Carolina	College Stadium; Greenville, NC	W 33–14		
November 12	Western Carolina	Phillips Field; Tampa, FL	W 48–0		
November 19	Appalachian State^{†}	Phillips Field; Tampa, FL	W 38–0	8,500	
December 3	Florida State	Phillips Field; Tampa, FL	L 7–26	13,000	
^{†}Homecoming
