= Bill Rhodes (American football back) =

American football fullback

Profile
- Position: Halfback

Personal information
- Born: December 5, 1934; La Junta, Colorado, U.S.
- Died: June 30, 2008 (age 73)
- Listed height: 6 ft 1 in (1.85 m)
- Listed weight: 200 lb (91 kg)

Career information
- College: Colorado Western (1953–1956)

William E. Rhodes (December 5, 1934 - June 30, 2008) was an American former football halfback who played for the Colorado Western Mountaineers from 1953 to 1956.

At age eight, he sustained severe burns and was told he would never walk again. He went through extensive rehabilitation and became a star athlete at high school in La Junta, Colorado, competing in football, basketball, and track.

Rhodes then played college football at Colorado Western. As a junior, he rushed for 1,153 yards. As a senior in 1956, he led all players in college football with 1,200 rushing yards on 130 carries for an average of 9.23 yards per carry. Against Adams State in 1956, he rushed for 327 yards, setting an all-time college football record. His career average of 8.49 yards per carry was the highest in college football history, and his career total of 4,294 rushing yards ranked second-best in college football history. He was also named to the 1956 Little All-America college football team.

Rhodes was selected by the San Francisco 49ers in the sixth round with the 62nd overall pick in the 1957 NFL draft. He attended training camp with the 49ers. He was the last man cut by the 49ers and then signed in September 1957 with the Toronto Argonauts.

Rhodes died in 2008.
