= 1955 college football rankings =

- Season: 1955
- Bowl season: 1955–56 bowl games
- Preseason No. 1: UCLA
- End of season champions: Oklahoma

Two human polls comprised the 1955 college football rankings. Unlike most sports, college football's governing body, the NCAA, does not bestow a national championship, instead that title is bestowed by one or more different polling agencies. There are two main weekly polls that begin in the preseason—the AP Poll and the Coaches Poll.

== Legend ==
	Increase in ranking
	Decrease in ranking
	Not ranked previous week
	National champion
(#–#)	Win–loss record
(Italics)	Number of first place votes
т	Tied with team above or below also with this symbol

== AP Poll ==
The final AP Poll was released on November 28, at the end of the 1955 regular season, weeks before the major bowls. The AP would not release a post-bowl season final poll regularly until 1968.

	Preseason Aug	Week 1 Sep 19	Week 2 Sep 26	Week 3 Oct 3	Week 4 Oct 10	Week 5 Oct 17	Week 6 Oct 24	Week 7 Oct 31	Week 8 Nov 7	Week 9 Nov 14	Week 10 Nov 21	Week 11 (Final) Nov 28	
1.	UCLA (33)	UCLA (1–0) (34)	Maryland (2–0) (45)	Maryland (3–0) (88)	Michigan (3–0) (80)	Michigan (4–0) (76)	Maryland (6–0) (62)	Maryland (7–0) (74)	Oklahoma (7–0) (115)	Oklahoma (8–0) (103)	Oklahoma (9–0) (114)	Oklahoma (10–0) (218)	1.
2.	Oklahoma (32)	Georgia Tech (1–0) (3)	Michigan (1–0) (48)	Michigan (2–0) (27)	Maryland (4–0) (45)	Maryland (5–0) (33)	Oklahoma (5–0) (53)	Oklahoma (6–0) (54)	Maryland (8–0) (89)	Maryland (9–0) (46)	Michigan State (8–1) (39)	Michigan State (8–1) (88)	2.
3.	Michigan (34)	Oklahoma (0–0) (10)	Georgia Tech (2–0) (11)	Oklahoma (2–0) (13)	Oklahoma (3–0) (21)	Oklahoma (4–0) (29)	Michigan (5–0) (39)	Michigan (6–0) (63)	Michigan State (6–1) (44)	Michigan State (7–1) (37)	Maryland (10–0) (35)	Maryland (10–0) (55)	3.
4.	Ohio State (9)	Michigan (0–0) (6)	Notre Dame (1–0) (3)	Georgia Tech (3–0) (9)	Notre Dame (3–0) (7)	Navy (4–0) (7)	Navy (5–0) (4)	Michigan State (5–1) (7)	UCLA (7–1) (9)	Notre Dame (7–1) (2)	UCLA (9–1) (6)	UCLA (9–1) (9)	4.
5.	Maryland (8)	Maryland (1–0) (1)	Oklahoma (1–0) (12)	Notre Dame (2–0) (4)	Georgia Tech (4–0) (3)	Duke (4–0) (15)	Michigan State (4–1) (4)	UCLA (6–1) (3)	Notre Dame (6–1) (2)	UCLA (8–1) (6)	Notre Dame (8–1) (3)	Ohio State (7–2) (4)	5.
6.	Notre Dame (2)	Ohio State (0–0)	Army (1–0) (1)	Army (2–0) (8)	Wisconsin (3–0) (11)	Michigan State (3–1) (4)	UCLA (5–1) (2)	Notre Dame (5–1) (1)	West Virginia (7–0) (18)	Michigan (7–1) (1)	Ohio State (7–2) (5)	TCU (9–1) (9)	6.
7.	Army	Pittsburgh (1–0)	UCLA (1–1)	UCLA (2–1)	TCU (4–0) (4)	UCLA (4–1) (3)	West Virginia (6–0) (13)	West Virginia (6–0) (16)	Michigan (6–1)	TCU (7–1) (2)	TCU (8–1) (3)	Georgia Tech (8–1–1)	7.
8.	Navy (1)	Ole Miss (1–0)	Ohio State (1–0) (1)	TCU (3–0) (5)	Navy (3–0)	West Virginia (4–0) (9)	Auburn (4–0–1) (8)	Georgia Tech (6–1)	TCU (6–1) (3)	Texas A&M (7–1–1)	Texas A&M (7–1–1)	Auburn (8–1–1) (6)	8.
9.	Miami (FL) (5)	Navy (0–0) т	USC (2–0) (3)	Wisconsin (2–0) (11)	UCLA (3–1) (1)	Auburn (3–0–1) (5)	Notre Dame (4–1)	Navy (5–1)	Texas A&M (6–1–1)	Ohio State (6–2) (1)	Georgia Tech (7–1–1)	Notre Dame (8–2)	9.
10.	Georgia Tech (1)	USC (1–0) (1) т	TCU (2–0) (3)	USC (3–0) (3)	West Virginia (3–0) (11)	USC (4–1) (1)	USC (5–1)	TCU (6–1) (2)	Ohio State (5–2) (1)	Georgia Tech (7–1–1)	Auburn (7–1–1)	Ole Miss (9–1) (1)	10.
11.	Rice	Notre Dame (0–0)	Rice (1–0)	West Virginia (2–0) (13)	Duke (3–0) (4)	Notre Dame (3–1)	Texas A&M (5–1)	Ohio State (4–2)	Georgia Tech (6–1–1)	Navy (6–1–1)	Navy (6–1–1)	Pittsburgh (7–3) (1)	11.
12.	Iowa (4)	Texas Tech (1–0)	Pittsburgh (2–0) (1)	Navy (2–0)	Washington (4–0) (4)	Texas A&M (4–1)	Georgia Tech (5–1)	Texas A&M (5–1–1)	Auburn (5–1–1) (2)	Auburn (6–1–1) (4)	Michigan (7–2)	Michigan (7–2)	12.
13.	USC (2)	Rice (0–0)	West Virginia (1–0) (3)	Duke (2–0) (3)	Michigan State (2–1)	Georgia Tech (4–1)	Holy Cross (4–1) (1)	Miami (OH) (6–0)	Navy (5–1–1)	West Virginia (7–1) (1)	Pittsburgh (7–3) (1)	USC (6–4)	13.
14.	Wisconsin	Army (0–0)	Iowa (1–0) (1)	Auburn (2–0)	Ohio State (2–1)	Colorado (4–0)	TCU (5–1)	Auburn (4–1–1)	Ole Miss (7–1)	Ole Miss (8–1)	Miami (FL) (5–3) (2)	Miami (FL) (6–3)	14.
15.	Ole Miss	Miami (FL) (0–1)	Navy (1–0) (1)	Miami (FL) (1–1)	Rice (2–0–1)	Wisconsin (3–1)	Ohio State (3–2)	Ole Miss (6–1)	Miami (OH) (7–0)	Pittsburgh (6–3) (1)	Ole Miss (8–1)	Miami (OH) (9–0)	15.
16.	SMU	LSU (1–0)	Duke (1–0)	Clemson (3–0)	USC (3–1)	Baylor (4–1)	Pittsburgh (4–2)	USC (5–2)	Illinois (4–3)	Miami (OH) (8–0)	Miami (OH) (8–0)	Stanford (6–3–1)	16.
17.	Auburn	Arkansas (1–0) (1)	Wisconsin (1–0)	Purdue (2–0)	Auburn (2–0–1)	Boston College (3–0) (1)	Duke (4–1)	Kentucky (4–2–1)	Pittsburgh (5–3)	Tennessee (5–2–1)	Stanford (6–3–1)	Texas A&M (7–2–1)	17.
18.	Duke (1)	Baylor (1–0)	Penn State (1–0) (1)	Washington (3–0) (1)	Army (2–1)	TCU (4–1)	Miami (OH) (5–0)	Syracuse (3–2)	Duke (4–2–1) т	Stanford (5–3–1)	Duke (6–2–1)	Navy (6–2–1)	18.
19.	West Virginia (1)	Florida (1–0) т	Washington (2–0) (1)	Kentucky (2–1)	Texas A&M (3–1)	Yale (4–0)	Washington (4–1–1)	Army (4–2)	Mississippi State (6–2) т	Oregon State (6–2)	Vanderbilt (7–2)	West Virginia (8–2)	19.
20.	Purdue (1)	Purdue (0–0) (1) т	Baylor (2–0)	Stanford (2–1)	Colorado (3–0) т; Kentucky (2–1–1) т	Holy Cross (4–0)	Ole Miss (5–1)	Mississippi State (6–1)	Iowa (3–3–1) т; Miami (FL) (3–3) т	Duke (5–2–1)	Syracuse (5–3)	Army (6–3)	20.
	Preseason Aug	Week 1 Sep 19	Week 2 Sep 26	Week 3 Oct 3	Week 4 Oct 10	Week 5 Oct 17	Week 6 Oct 24	Week 7 Oct 31	Week 8 Nov 7	Week 9 Nov 14	Week 10 Nov 21	Week 11 (Final) Nov 28	
		Dropped: Auburn; Duke; Iowa; SMU; West Virginia; Wisconsin	Dropped: Arkansas; Florida; LSU; Miami (FL); Ole Miss; Purdue; Texas Tech	Dropped: Baylor; Iowa; Ohio State; Penn State; Pittsburgh; Rice	Dropped: Clemson; Miami (FL); Purdue; Stanford	Dropped: Army; Kentucky; Ohio State; Rice; Washington	Dropped: Baylor; Boston College; Colorado; Wisconsin; Yale	Dropped: Duke; Holy Cross; Pittsburgh; Washington	Dropped: Army; Kentucky; Syracuse; USC	Dropped: Illinois; Iowa; Miami (FL); Mississippi State	Dropped: Oregon State; Tennessee; West Virginia	Dropped: Duke; Syracuse; Vanderbilt	

== United Press Coaches Poll ==
The final United Press (UP) Coaches Poll was released prior to the bowl games, on November 28.
Oklahoma received 24 of the 35 first-place votes; Michigan State received seven, and two each to Maryland and UCLA.

Ranking	Team	Conference	Bowl
1	Oklahoma	Big Seven	Won Orange, 20–6
2	Michigan State	Big Ten	Won Rose, 17–14
3	Maryland	ACC	Lost Orange, 6–20
4	UCLA	Pacific Coast	Lost Rose, 14–17
5	Ohio State	Big Ten	none
6	TCU	Southwest	Lost Cotton, 13–14
7	Georgia Tech	SEC	Won Sugar, 7–0
8	Auburn	SEC	Lost Gator, 13–25
9	Ole Miss	SEC	Won Cotton, 14–13
10	Notre Dame	Independent	none
11	Pittsburgh	Independent	Lost Sugar, 0–7
12	USC	Pacific Coast	none
13	Michigan	Big Ten	none
14	Texas A&M	Southwest	none
15	Army	Independent	none
16	Duke	ACC	none
17	West Virginia	Southern	none
18	Miami (FL)	Independent	none
19	Iowa	Big Ten	none
20	Miami (OH)	Mid-American	none
20	Navy	Independent	none
20	Stanford	Pacific Coast	none
23	Kentucky	SEC	none
23	Tennessee	SEC	none

- Prior to the 1975 season, the Big Ten and Pacific Coast (later AAWU / Pac-8) conferences allowed only one postseason participant each, for the Rose Bowl.
- The Ivy League has prohibited its members from participating in postseason football since the league was officially formed in 1954.

== Litkenhous Ratings ==
The Litkenhous Ratings included rankings of over 650 teams. The top 200 teams in the Litkehous analysis were:

1. Oklahoma (11-0) - 109.2
2. UCLA (9-2) - 107.5
3. TCU (9-2) - 107.2
4. Maryland (10-1) - 107.0
5. Michigan State (9-1) - 106.9
6. Georgia Tech (9-1-1) - 101.7
7. Ohio State (7-2) - 100.9
8. Ole Miss (10-1) - 100.5
9. USC (6-4) - 99.9
10. Notre Dame (8-2) - 99.0
11. Michigan (7-2) - 98.3
12. Stanford (6-3-1)195 - 98.2
13. Texas A&M (7-2-1) -98.2
14. Miami (FL) (9-0) - 97.2
15. Vanderbilt (8-3) - 96.9
16. Tennessee (6-3-1) - 95.7
17. Army (6-3) - 95.4
18. Pittsburgh (7-4) - 95.3
19. Duke (7-2-1) - 95.2
20. Navy (6-2-1) - 94.5
21. Iowa (3-5-1) - 93.3
22. West Virginia (8-2) - 93.0
23. Auburn (8-2-1) - 92.6
24. LSU (3-5-2) - 92.1
25. Texas (5-5) - 92.1
26. Kentucky (6-3-1) - 92.0
27. Illinois (5-3-1) - 91.9
28. Purdue (5-3-1) - 91.9
29. Miami (OH) - 91.3
30. SMU (4-6) - 91.1
31. Washington (5-4-1) - 90.8
32. Wisconsin (4-5) - 90.6
33. Arkansas (5-4-1) - 90.0
34. Clemson (7-3) - 89.6
35. Xavier (7-2) - 89.5
36. Baylor (5-5) - 88.8
37. Mississippi State (6-4) - 88.8
38. Tulane (5-4-1) - 87.8
39. Florida (4-6) - 87.6
40. Syracuse (5-3) - 87.6
41. Georgia (4-6) - 87.3
42. Mississippi Southern (9-1) - 86.6
43. Oregon (6-4) - 86.5
44. Minnesota (3-6) - 85.9
45. Pacific (5-4) - 85.5
46. Texas Tech (7-3-1) - 85.5
47. Rice (2-7-1) - 84.5
48. Colorado (6-4) - 83.9
49. Boston College (5-2-1) - 83.4
50. Arizona State (8-2-1) - 83.3
51. Indiana (3-6) - 82.9
52. Texas Western (6-2-2) - 82.7
53. Oregon State (6-3) - 81.7
54. Wichita (7-2-1) - 81.0
55. Yale (7-2) - 81.0
56. Denver (8-2) - 80.9
57. Penn State (5-4) - 80.3
58. Colgate (6-3) - 79.8
59. Houston (6-4) - 79.7
60. Nebraska (5-5) - 79.2
61. Trinity (TX) (9-0) - 78.3
62. North Carolina (3-7) - 78.0
63. Utah (6-3) - 77.7
64. Wake Forest (5-4-1) - 77.6
65. George Washington - 76.8
66. Chattanooga (5-4-1) - 76.7
67. Delaware (8-1) - 76.7
68. California (2-7-1) - 76.3
69. North Texas (5-4-1) - 76.3
70. San Jose State (5-3-1) - 76.2
71. Virginia Tech (6-3-1) - 75.9
72. Kent State (6-2-1)
73. Bowling Green (7-1-1) - 75.7
74. Arizona (5-4-1) - 75.2
75. Missouri (1-9) - 75.0
76. Princeton (7-2) - 74.8
77. Kansas State (4-6) - 74.1
78. Louisiana Tech (9-1) - 73.9
79. NC State (4-5-1) - 73.6
80. Colorado A&M (8-2) - 73.4
81. West Texas (4-4-1) - 73.0
82. Alabama (0-10) - 72.9
83. Wyoming (8-3) - 72.8
84. Detroit (5-3-1) - 72.4
85. Lafayette (6-2) - 72.4
86. Boise (7-2) - 72.3
87. Louisville (7-2) - 72.1
88. Northwestern (0-8-1) - 72.0
89. Compton (11-0) - 71.9
90. Ohio (5-4) - 71.9
91. Dayton (3-6-1) - 71.4
92. Florida State (5-5) - 71.3
93. Cornell (5-4) - 71.0
94. Hardin–Simmons (5-5) - 70.7
95. Tennessee Tech (7-3) - 69.9
96. Kansas (3-6-1) - 69.5
97. Oklahoma A&M (2-8) - 69.2
98. Harvard (3-4-1) - 69.0
99. Richmond (4-3-2) - 68.7
100. Central Michigan (8-1) - 68.6
101. South Carolina (3-6) - 68.6
102. Tampa (7-2) - 68.6
103. Virginia (1-9) - 68.6
104. Southwest Texas (6-1-2) - 68.5
105. Idaho (2-7) - 68.2
106. Rhode Island (6-1-2) - 68.2
107. Trinity (CT) (7-0) - 67.8
108. Gettysburg - 67.7
109. William & Mary (1-7-1) - 67.7
110. Marquette (2-6-1) - 67.6
111. Dartmouth (3-6) - 66.7
112. Lehigh (7-2) - 66.6
113. Sam Houston (6-1-2) - 66.6
114. Villanova (1-9) - 66.6
115. Iowa State - 66.4
116. Washington State (1-7-2) - 66.4
117. Marshall (3-6) - 66.2
118. Utah State (4-6) - 66.2
119. Maine (5-1-1) - 65.6
120. McNeese (7-1-1) - 65.5
121. Cincinnati (1-6-2) - 65.1
122. Holy Cross (6-4) - 65.1
123. Memphis State (2-7) - 64.8
124. Tulsa (2-7-1) - 64.2
125. Youngstown - 64.0
126. Muskingum (8-0) - 63.7
127. Northeast Oklahoma A&M - 63.4
128. Fresno State (9-1) - 63.2
129. Brown (2-7) - 63.1
130. Hawaii (7-4) - 62.8
131. East Texas (5-4-1) - 62.8
132. Abilene Christian (3-5-2) - 62.4
133. Arkansas State (6-3) - 62.2
134. Connecticut (4-4) - 61.8
135. Southeastern Louisiana - 61.5
136. Cal Poly (7-3) - 61.0
137. Akron (6-2) - 60.7
138. Howard Payne - 60.7
139. Florence 60.1
140. Heidelberg (9-0) - 60.0
141. Murray - 59.8
142. McMurry - 59.6
143. Boston University (2-6) - 59.0
144. Tufts - 58.8
145.
146. Jacksonville - 58.2
147. Eastern Montana - 58.2
148. Mt. San Antonio - 58.2
149. New Hampshire (2-4-2) - 58.2
150. Middle Tennessee (7-2-1) - 58.1
151. Northwestern Louisiana - 57.9
152. Rutgers (3-5) - 57.9
153. Cameron State - 57.8
154. Southwestern Louisiana (5-4) - 57.2
155. Bucknell (2-6-1) - 57.0
156. Yuba - 57.0
157. Eastern Kentucky - 56.6
158. Lenoir Rhyne - 56.6
159. Tyler JC - 56.5
160. William Carey - 56.5
161. Penn (0-9) - 56.4
162. Stephen F. Austin (5-4) - 56.4
163. South Dakota State (6-2-1) - 55.8
164. Hillsdale (9-0) - 55.6
165. Toledo (3-5-1) - 55.5
166. Springfield - 55.4
167. Idaho State (8-1) - 55.2
168. Morris Harvey - 55.2
169. Westminster (PA) - 55.1
170. Alfred - 55.0
171. Concordia (MN) - 55.0
172. Lewis & Clark - 55.0
173. Worcester Poly - 55.0
174. Columbia (1-8) - 54.9
175. Moravian - 54.9
176. Omaha - 54.9
177. St. Joseph (IN) - 54.8
178. Midwestern - 54.7
179. San Francisco CC - 54.7
180. Evansville (6-3) - 54.6
181. Antelope Valley - 54.3
182. Texas A&I (4-6) - 54.2
183. Menlo JC
184. Iowa State Teachers (8-1) - 53.5
185. Davidson (5-4) - 53.4
186. Kilgore JC
187. Wofford
188. VMI (1-9) - 53.2
189. Porterville - 53.1
190. Michigan State Normal (7-2) - 53.0
191. St. Cloud - 53.0
192. St. Olaf - 52.8
193. UMass (4-4) - 52.7
194. Western Kentucky (3-6) - 52.4
195. New Mexico (2-8) - 52.4
196. Juniata (8-0-1) - 52.2
197. Lamar Tech (4-6) - 52.1
198. Wharton City - 52.1
199. Newberry - 51.9
200. El Camino - 51.5
215. Drake (4-4) - 53.0
224. Montana (3-7) - 48.7
225. South Dakota (4-4) - 48.7
232. North Dakota (6-3) - 46.3
254. New Mexico A&M (3-7) - 46.3
255. BYU (1-9) - 46.2
262. Washington University (5-4) - 45.9

== HBCU rankings ==
The Pittsburgh Courier, a leading African American newspaper, ranked the top 1955 teams from historically black colleges and universities in an era when college football was largely segregated. The rankings were published on December 10:

- 1. Grambling (10–0)
- 2. Maryland State (9–0)
- 3. Florida A&M (7–1–1)
- 4. Tennessee A&I (7–2)
- 5. Southern (7–2–1)
- 6. Langston (6–2–1)
- 7. North Carolina A&T (4–1–3)
- 8. Texas Southern (7–2–1)
- 9. North Carolina College (4–1–2)
- 10. Prairie View A&M (8–2–1)
- 11. Kentucky State (7–2)
- 12. Delaware State (7–1)
- 13. Morgan State (6–2)
- 14. Virginia State (5–2–2)
- 15. Morris Brown (6–3)

The Associated Negro Press also published rankings on December 8:

- 1. Grambling (10–0)
- 2. Maryland State (9–0)
- 3. Florida A&M (7–1–1)
- 4. Southern (7–2–1)
- 5. Langston (6–2–1)
- 6. Tennessee A&I (7–2)
- 7. Texas Southern (7–2–1)
- 8. Prairie View A&M (8–2–1)
- 9. North Carolina A&T (4–1–3)
- 10. Lincoln (MO) (6–3)
- 11. Kentucky State (7–2)
- 12. Morris Brown (6–3)
- 13. Morgan State (6–2)
- 14. Delaware State (7–1)

== See also ==
- 1955 College Football All-America Team
