= 1955 Drexel Dragons football team =

American college football season

1955 Drexel Dragons football
- Conference: Independent
- Record: 8–0
- Head coach: Eddie Allen (6th season)
- Captains: Ev Gest; Art Del Campo
- Home stadium: Drexel Field

1955 Eastern college football independents records
	Conf.			Overall
Team	W	L	T	W		L		T
Alfred		–		8	–	0	–	0
Drexel		–		8	–	0	–	0
Trinity (CT)		–		7	–	0	–	0
Juniata		–		8	–	0	–	1
Carnegie Tech		–		5	–	1	–	1
Tufts		–		5	–	2	–	0
Boston College		–		5	–	2	–	1
No. 20 Army		–		6	–	3	–	0
Colgate		–		6	–	3	–	0
No. 11 Pittsburgh		–		7	–	4	–	0
Holy Cross		–		6	–	4	–	0
Syracuse		–		5	–	3	–	0
Penn State		–		5	–	4	–	0
Buffalo		–		4	–	4	–	1
Hofstra		–		3	–	6	–	0
Bucknell		–		2	–	6	–	1
Boston University		–		2	–	6	–	0
Franklin & Marshall		–		2	–	6	–	0
Villanova		–		1	–	9	–	0
Temple		–		0	–	8	–	0
Rankings from AP Poll

The 1955 Drexel Dragons football team was an American football team that represented the Drexel Institute of Technology (renamed Drexel University in 1970) as an independent during the 1955 college football season. In their sixth year under head coach Eddie Allen, the Dragons compiled an 8–0 record and outscored opponents by a total of 198 to 72. They were the first Drexel football team to compile a perfect season since the 1898 team compiled a 7–0 record. With four victories at the end of the 1954 season, the Dragons extended their winning streak to 12 games. The team played its four home games at Drexel Field in Philadelphia.

Key players included a pair of two-way players: quarterback Bill Zador and left guard Vince Vidas. Zador set a new Drexel record with nine touchdown passes, was an excellent defensive back, and also handled punt returns, kickoffs, and field goals for Drexel. Against Coast Guard, Zador ran for a touchdown (set up by his own 39-yard interception return), passed for two, and set up a fourth with a 41-yard punt return. Vidas received first-team honors from the Associated Press on its 1955 Little All-America college football team. At the end of the 1955 season, coach Allen said of Vidas: "Vidas is the most amazing football player I have ever seen. There hasn't been a flaw in his work on both offense and defense. He could play any position if necessary."

On November 20, a group of 100 Drexel students walked to the University of Pennsylvania campus to challenge the Penn team to a football game. The two schools had met only once, in 1924, resulting in a 52–0 victory for Penn. As the Drexel and Penn students skirmished, Philadelphia police responded and ordered the crowd to disburse.

Zador led the team in passing. He completed 43 of 96 passing attempts for 687 yards withs 9 touchdowns and 8 interceptions. Halfback Frank Russo was Drexel's leading rushing with 430 yards on 82 carries, followed by fullback George Piper with 376 yards on 72 attempts. The team's leading receivers were left end Ron Kleppinger with 18 receptions for 360 yards and right end Iles Wauhop with 8 catches for 129 yards. Russo also led the team in scoring with 43 points from seven touchdowns and one point after touchdown (PAT).

The 1955 Drexel team was inducted as a group in 1980 into Drexel's athletic hall of fame. It was the first and only Drexel football team to receive the honor. Vince Vidas was also inducted as an individual in 1973.

== Schedule ==
Date	Time	Opponent	Site	Result	Attendance	Source
September 30	8:00 p.m.	at West Chester	Wayne Field; West Chester, PA	W 7–0		
October 8		Ursinus	Drexel Field; Philadelphia, PA	W 20–13		
October 15		Franklin & Marshall	Drexel Field; Philadelphia, PA	W 23–6		
October 22		at Lycoming	Williamsport, PA	W 33–14		
October 29	2:00 p.m.	Johns Hopkins^{†}	Drexel Field; Philadelphia, PA	W 34–13	6,500	
November 5		at Western Maryland	Hoffa Field; Westminster, MD	W 34–13		
November 12		Coast Guard	Drexel Field; Philadelphia, PA	W 27–7		
November 19		at Pennsylvania Military	PMC Stadium; Chester, PA	W 20–6	2,500	
^{†}Homecoming; All times are in Eastern time

== Roster ==
1955 Drexel Dragons football team roster
Players
Coaches
Offense

Pos.	#	Name	Class
TE, K	24	Ron Kleppinger	Jr
OT		Vince Vidas	Jr
G		Bob Miller	Sr
C, LB	22	Ev Gest (C)	Sr
G	33	Jack Eidenberg
OT		Ed Pietrzak	Sr
TE	28	Will Malone	Sr
HB	11	Art Del Campo (C)	Sr
HB, P		Frank Russo
FB	36	George Piper	Sr
QB, K	19	Bill Zador	Jr
RB	14	Tony Spadaccini	Jr
TE		Lou Cobano
TE	21	Iles Wauhop	Jr
TE		Dave Smith	So
G		Gordon MacShane	Sr
FB	18	Kenny Pastor	Sr
HB		John Maloney	So
[[American football positions|]]		Art Barnes
QB		Ed Kolongowski
HB/FB		Herman Ringler	Sr
[[American football positions|]]		Frank Rapprich	Sr
[[American football positions|]]		D. Hughes
[[American football positions|]]		K. Lysle
[[American football positions|]]		S. Goldberg
[[American football positions|]]		H. Tempest
[[American football positions|]]		R. Paranich
[[American football positions|]]		W. Winterbottom
[[American football positions|]]		F. Costantini
[[American football positions|]]		D. Medoff
[[American football positions|]]		H. Schmidt
[[American football positions|]]		R. Carson
[[American football positions|]]		D. Wagoner

Defense

Pos.	#	Name	Class

Special teams

Pos.	#	Name	Class

Head coach

- Eddie Allen

Coordinators/assistant coaches

- Jack Hinkle
- Bob Glazier

Legend

- (C) Team captain
- (S) Suspended
- (I) Ineligible
- Injured
- Redshirt
