= 1955 Buffalo Bulls football team =

American college football season

1955 Buffalo Bulls football
- Conference: Independent
- Record: 4–4–1
- Head coach: Dick Offenhamer (1st season)
- Captain: Pete Rao
- Home stadium: Rotary Field

1955 Eastern college football independents records
	Conf.			Overall
Team	W	L	T	W		L		T
Alfred		–		8	–	0	–	0
Drexel		–		8	–	0	–	0
Trinity (CT)		–		7	–	0	–	0
Juniata		–		8	–	0	–	1
Carnegie Tech		–		5	–	1	–	1
Tufts		–		5	–	2	–	0
Boston College		–		5	–	2	–	1
No. 20 Army		–		6	–	3	–	0
Colgate		–		6	–	3	–	0
No. 11 Pittsburgh		–		7	–	4	–	0
Holy Cross		–		6	–	4	–	0
Syracuse		–		5	–	3	–	0
Penn State		–		5	–	4	–	0
Buffalo		–		4	–	4	–	1
Hofstra		–		3	–	6	–	0
Bucknell		–		2	–	6	–	1
Boston University		–		2	–	6	–	0
Franklin & Marshall		–		2	–	6	–	0
Villanova		–		1	–	9	–	0
Temple		–		0	–	8	–	0
Rankings from AP Poll

The 1955 Buffalo Bulls football team was an American football team that represented the University of Buffalo as an independent during the 1955 college football season. In its first season under head coach Dick Offenhamer, the team compiled a 4–4–1 record. The team played its home games at Rotary Field in Buffalo, New York.

== Schedule ==
Date	Opponent	Site	Result	Attendance	Source
September 24	Cortland	Rotary Field; Buffalo, NY	L 7–28		
October 1	at Brockport	Memorial Field; Brockport, NY	W 26–0		
October 8	Hobart	Rotary Field; Buffalo, NY	T 0–0		
October 14	at McMaster	Hamilton, ON	W 29–0		
October 22	Western Reserve	Rotary Field; Buffalo, NY	L 13–22		
October 29	at Alfred	Merrill Field; Alfred, NY	L 14–26		
November 5	at St. Lawrence	Canton, NY	W 39–12		
November 12	Brandeis	Rotary Field; Buffalo, NY	L 13–20		
November 19	RPI	Rotary Field; Buffalo, NY	W 45–0		
