= 1955 Temple Owls football team =

American college football season

1955 Temple Owls football
- Conference: Independent
- Record: 0–8
- Head coach: Josh Cody (1st season)
- Home stadium: Temple Stadium

1955 Eastern college football independents records
	Conf.			Overall
Team	W	L	T	W		L		T
Alfred		–		8	–	0	–	0
Drexel		–		8	–	0	–	0
Trinity (CT)		–		7	–	0	–	0
Juniata		–		8	–	0	–	1
Carnegie Tech		–		5	–	1	–	1
Tufts		–		5	–	2	–	0
Boston College		–		5	–	2	–	1
No. 20 Army		–		6	–	3	–	0
Colgate		–		6	–	3	–	0
No. 11 Pittsburgh		–		7	–	4	–	0
Holy Cross		–		6	–	4	–	0
Syracuse		–		5	–	3	–	0
Penn State		–		5	–	4	–	0
Buffalo		–		4	–	4	–	1
Hofstra		–		3	–	6	–	0
Bucknell		–		2	–	6	–	1
Boston University		–		2	–	6	–	0
Franklin & Marshall		–		2	–	6	–	0
Villanova		–		1	–	9	–	0
Temple		–		0	–	8	–	0
Rankings from AP Poll

The 1955 Temple Owls football team was an American football team that represented Temple University as an independent during the 1955 college football season. In its first and only season under head coach Josh Cody, the team compiled a 0–8 record. Cody was Temple's athletic director (1952–1959) and basketball coach (1942–1952); he stepped in as head football coach for the 1955 season following the departure of the prior head coach, Albert Kawal. The team played its home games at Temple Stadium in Philadelphia.

== Schedule ==
Date	Opponent	Site	Result	Attendance	Source
September 24	at Holy Cross	Fitton Field; Worcester, MA	L 7–42	5,000	
October 1	Scranton^{†}	Temple Stadium; Philadelphia, PA	L 6–20	5,000	
October 15	at Bucknell	Memorial Stadium; Lewisburg, PA	L 0–38	6,200	
October 22	at Carnegie Tech	Forbes Field; Pittsburgh, PA	L 16–18	4,116	
October 29	at Lehigh	Taylor Stadium; Bethlehem, PA	L 14–27	4,200	
November 5	Muhlenberg	Temple Stadium; Philadelphia, PA	L 6–7	3,500	
November 12	Delaware	Temple Stadium; Philadelphia, PA	L 0–46	5,000	
November 19	at Boston University	Boston University Field; Boston, MA	L 0–25	8,000	
^{†}Homecoming
