= 1955 Alfred Saxons football team =

American college football season

1955 Alfred Saxons football
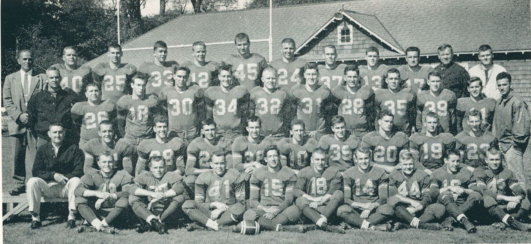
- Conference: Independent
- Record: 8–0
- Head coach: Alex Yunevich (15th season)
- Home stadium: Merrill Field

1955 Eastern college football independents records
	Conf.			Overall
Team	W	L	T	W		L		T
Alfred		–		8	–	0	–	0
Drexel		–		8	–	0	–	0
Trinity (CT)		–		7	–	0	–	0
Juniata		–		8	–	0	–	1
Carnegie Tech		–		5	–	1	–	1
Tufts		–		5	–	2	–	0
Boston College		–		5	–	2	–	1
No. 20 Army		–		6	–	3	–	0
Colgate		–		6	–	3	–	0
No. 11 Pittsburgh		–		7	–	4	–	0
Holy Cross		–		6	–	4	–	0
Syracuse		–		5	–	3	–	0
Penn State		–		5	–	4	–	0
Buffalo		–		4	–	4	–	1
Hofstra		–		3	–	6	–	0
Bucknell		–		2	–	6	–	1
Boston University		–		2	–	6	–	0
Franklin & Marshall		–		2	–	6	–	0
Villanova		–		1	–	9	–	0
Temple		–		0	–	8	–	0
Rankings from AP Poll

The 1955 Alfred Saxons football team was an American football team that represented Alfred University of Alfred, New York, as an independent during the 1955 college football season. In their 15th season under head coach Alex Yunevich, the Saxons compiled a perfect 8–0 record, shut out six of eight opponents, and outscored all opponents by a total of 190 to 21. The team rejected a "feeler" from officials of the Refrigerator Bowl.

Jimmy Ryan led the team in scoring with 55 points and also led the team in rushing with 558 yards on 92 carries. End Charlie Shultz led the team with 10 receptions for 147 yards. Shultz received first-team honors on the 1955 Little All-America college football team.

Alfred had back-to-back perfect seasons in 1955 and 1956. The team played its home games at Merrill Field in Alfred, New York.

== Schedule ==
Date	Opponent	Site	Result	Attendance	Source
September 24	Brockport State	Merrill Field; Alfred, NY	W 50–0	5,100	
October 1	Cortland State	Merrill Field; Alfred, NY	W 12–0		
October 8	St. Lawrence^{†}	Merrill Field; Alfred, NY	W 38–0	6,000	
October 15	at Albright	Reading, PA	W 13–7		
October 21	at Ithaca	Percy Field; Ithaca, NY	W 26–0		
October 29	Buffalo	Merrill Field; Alfred, NY	W 26–14		
November 5	at Merchant Marine	Kings Point, NY	W 19–0		
November 12	at Hobart	Boswell Field; Geneva, NY	W 6–0	5,000	
^{†}Homecoming

== Players ==
- Jay L. Abbott, halfback
- Alfred J. Bilanski, guard
- Don C. Carlin, tackle
- John S. Dennis, end
- John N. DeSantis, tackle
- George W. Meyer, guard
- Chet Micciche, center
- Albert J. Moresco, quarterback
- Jimmie Ryan, fullback
- Charlie Shultz, end
- Nick Teta
- Al Weaver, halfback
