= 1955 Holy Cross Crusaders football team =

American college football season

1955 Holy Cross Crusaders football
- Conference: Independent
- Record: 6–4
- Head coach: Eddie Anderson (12th season)
- Captain: James L. Buonopane
- Home stadium: Fitton Field

1955 Eastern college football independents records
	Conf.			Overall
Team	W	L	T	W		L		T
Alfred		–		8	–	0	–	0
Drexel		–		8	–	0	–	0
Trinity (CT)		–		7	–	0	–	0
Juniata		–		8	–	0	–	1
Carnegie Tech		–		5	–	1	–	1
Tufts		–		5	–	2	–	0
Boston College		–		5	–	2	–	1
No. 20 Army		–		6	–	3	–	0
Colgate		–		6	–	3	–	0
No. 11 Pittsburgh		–		7	–	4	–	0
Holy Cross		–		6	–	4	–	0
Syracuse		–		5	–	3	–	0
Penn State		–		5	–	4	–	0
Buffalo		–		4	–	4	–	1
Hofstra		–		3	–	6	–	0
Bucknell		–		2	–	6	–	1
Boston University		–		2	–	6	–	0
Franklin & Marshall		–		2	–	6	–	0
Villanova		–		1	–	9	–	0
Temple		–		0	–	8	–	0
Rankings from AP Poll

The 1955 Holy Cross Crusaders football team was an American football team that represented the College of the Holy Cross as an independent program during the 1955 college football season. In its 12th year under head coach Eddie Anderson, the team compiled a 6–4 record.

The team played home games at Fitton Field on campus in Worcester, Massachusetts.

== Schedule ==
Date	Opponent	Site	Result	Attendance	Source
September 24	Temple	Fitton Field; Worcester, MA	W 42–7	5,000	
October 1	at Dartmouth	Memorial Field; Hanover, NH	W 29–21		
October 8	at Colgate	Colgate Athletic Field; Hamilton, NY	W 15–14	6,000	
October 16	Quantico Marines	Fitton Field; Worcester, MA	W 7–0	8,000	
October 22	Boston University^	Fitton Field; Worcester, MA	W 20–12	17,000	
October 29	Syracuse^{†}	Fitton Field; Worcester, MA	L 9–49	24,000	
November 6	Dayton	Fitton Field; Worcester, MA	W 13–7	17,000	
November 12	at Marquette	Marquette Stadium; Milwaukee, WI	L 6–18	8,500	
November 19	at Connecticut	Memorial Stadium; Storrs, CT	L 0–6	5,000	
November 26	vs. Boston College	Fenway Park; Boston, MA (rivalry)	L 7–26	37,235	
^{†}Homecoming; ^ Family weekend

== Statistical leaders ==
Statistical leaders for the 1955 Crusaders included:

- Rushing: Dick Surrette, 286 yards on 69 attempts
- Passing: Jack Stephans, 554 yards, 35 completions and 5 touchdowns on 89 attempts
- Receiving: Carlin Lynch, 290 yards and 2 touchdowns on 23 receptions
- Scoring: Dave Hohl, 42 points on 12 PATs
- Total offense: Jack Stephans, 653 yards (554 passing, 99 rushing)
- All-purpose yards: Dave Hohl, 180 yards (214 receiving, 180 rushing)
