= 1955 Syracuse Orangemen football team =

American college football season

1955 Syracuse Orangemen football
- Conference: Independent
- Record: 5–3
- Head coach: Ben Schwartzwalder (7th season)
- Captain: Game captains
- Home stadium: Archbold Stadium

1955 Eastern college football independents records
	Conf.			Overall
Team	W	L	T	W		L		T
Alfred		–		8	–	0	–	0
Drexel		–		8	–	0	–	0
Trinity (CT)		–		7	–	0	–	0
Juniata		–		8	–	0	–	1
Carnegie Tech		–		5	–	1	–	1
Tufts		–		5	–	2	–	0
Boston College		–		5	–	2	–	1
No. 20 Army		–		6	–	3	–	0
Colgate		–		6	–	3	–	0
No. 11 Pittsburgh		–		7	–	4	–	0
Holy Cross		–		6	–	4	–	0
Syracuse		–		5	–	3	–	0
Penn State		–		5	–	4	–	0
Buffalo		–		4	–	4	–	1
Hofstra		–		3	–	6	–	0
Bucknell		–		2	–	6	–	1
Boston University		–		2	–	6	–	0
Franklin & Marshall		–		2	–	6	–	0
Villanova		–		1	–	9	–	0
Temple		–		0	–	8	–	0
Rankings from AP Poll

The 1955 Syracuse Orangemen football team represented Syracuse University as an independent during the 1955 college football season. The Orangemen were led by seventh-year head coach Ben Schwartzwalder and played their home games at Archbold Stadium in Syracuse, New York. Syracuse finished the season with a 5–3 record and were not invited to a bowl game.

== Schedule ==
Date	Opponent	Rank	Site	Result	Attendance	Source
September 24	No. 7 Pittsburgh		Archbold Stadium; Syracuse, NY (rivalry)	L 12–22	16,000	
October 8	Boston University		Archbold Stadium; Syracuse, NY	W 27–12	15,000	
October 15	at No. 18 Army		Michie Stadium; West Point, NY	W 13–0	12,500	
October 22	No. 2 Maryland		Archbold Stadium; Syracuse, NY	L 13–34	32,500	
October 29	at No. 13 Holy Cross		Fitton Field; Worcester, MA	W 49–9	24,000	
November 5	at Penn State	No. 18	New Beaver Field; University Park, PA (rivalry)	L 20–21	30,434	
November 12	Colgate		Archbold Stadium; Syracuse, NY (rivalry)	W 26–19	39,500	
November 19	at No. 13 West Virginia		Mountaineer Field; Morgantown, WV (rivalry)	W 20–13	22,000	
Rankings from AP Poll released prior to the game

== Roster ==
- HB Jim Brown
