= 1955 Pittsburgh Panthers football team =

American college football season

1955 Pittsburgh Panthers football

Eastern champion

Sugar Bowl, L 0–7 vs. Georgia Tech
- Conference: Independent

Ranking
- Coaches: No. 11
- AP: No. 11
- Record: 7–4
- Head coach: John Michelosen (1st season)
- Home stadium: Pitt Stadium

1955 Eastern college football independents records
	Conf.			Overall
Team	W	L	T	W		L		T
Alfred		–		8	–	0	–	0
Drexel		–		8	–	0	–	0
Trinity (CT)		–		7	–	0	–	0
Juniata		–		8	–	0	–	1
Carnegie Tech		–		5	–	1	–	1
Tufts		–		5	–	2	–	0
Boston College		–		5	–	2	–	1
No. 20 Army		–		6	–	3	–	0
Colgate		–		6	–	3	–	0
No. 11 Pittsburgh		–		7	–	4	–	0
Holy Cross		–		6	–	4	–	0
Syracuse		–		5	–	3	–	0
Penn State		–		5	–	4	–	0
Buffalo		–		4	–	4	–	1
Hofstra		–		3	–	6	–	0
Bucknell		–		2	–	6	–	1
Boston University		–		2	–	6	–	0
Franklin & Marshall		–		2	–	6	–	0
Villanova		–		1	–	9	–	0
Temple		–		0	–	8	–	0
Rankings from AP Poll

The 1955 Pittsburgh Panthers football team represented the University of Pittsburgh as an independent during the 1955 college football season. The Panthers were led by first-year head coach John Michelosen and played their home games at Pitt Stadium in Pittsburgh, Pennsylvania.

In a season that included upsets over top-ten teams Duke and rival West Virginia, Pitt had their most successful season in years. The Panthers finished ranked in the polls for the first time since 1938 and played in their first bowl game since the 1937 Rose Bowl.

Pittsburgh was invited to the 1956 Sugar Bowl, played against Georgia Tech. Intense controversy surrounded the bowl game, as Pittsburgh had a black player, Bobby Grier, at a time when the sport was not fully integrated. Many people opposed Pittsburgh playing in the bowl, and having desegregated seating sections in the stands, including Georgia governor Marvin Griffin. Georgia's Governor publicly threatened Georgia Tech's president Blake R. Van Leer in an attempt to bar Grier or stop the game. The game ultimately was played without incident, and marked the first integrated Sugar Bowl.

== Schedule ==
Date	Opponent	Rank	Site	TV	Result	Attendance	Source
September 17	California		Pitt Stadium; Pittsburgh, PA		W 27–7	33,999–34,976	
September 24	at Syracuse	No. 7	Archbold Stadium; Syracuse, NY		W 22–12	14,952	
October 1	at No. 5 Oklahoma	No. 12	Owen Field; Norman, OK		L 14–26	55,412–58,000	
October 8	vs. No. 12 Navy		Memorial Stadium; Baltimore, MD		L 0–21	13,229–20,000	
October 15	Nebraska		Pitt Stadium; Pittsburgh, PA		W 21–7	19,350–21,006	
October 22	at No. 5 Duke		Duke Stadium; Durham, NC		W 26–7	19,451–31,000	
October 29	Miami (FL)	No. 16	Pitt Stadium; Pittsburgh, PA		L 7–21	37,230–40,117	
November 5	Virginia		Pitt Stadium; Pittsburgh, PA		W 18–7	18,867–21,938	
November 12	No. 6 West Virginia	No. 17	Pitt Stadium; Pittsburgh, PA		W 26–7	55,772–57,996	
November 19	at Penn State	No. 15	New Beaver Field; University Park, PA (rivalry)		W 20–0	28,361–31,200	
January 2	vs. No. 7 Georgia Tech	No. 11	Tulane Stadium; New Orleans, LA (Sugar Bowl)	ABC	L 0–7	76,535–80,175	
Rankings from AP Poll released prior to the game

== Preseason ==
On December 5, the Sun-Telegraph reported that John Michelosen was the front runner for the Pitt head coaching job: “The former Pitt quarterback, who became an aide to the late Dr. Jock Sutherland and Steeler head coach and assistant to the resigned Red Dawson the past two seasons, is the choice of the Panthers' Varsity Letterman's Club, the Pitt players and legions of alumni members of the university." On December 6, Athletic Director Tom Hamilton announced that John Michelosen had been approved by the Athletic Committee, the Board of Trustees and Chancellor Rufus Fitzgerald to be the eighth head coach of the University of Pittsburgh since the departure of Jock Sutherland in 1938.

Coach Michelosen retained Ernie Hefferle, Steve Petro, Robert Timmons and Walt Cummins from Dawson's staff, and added Jack Wiley and Victor Fusia.

March 21 was the official start of the NCAA sanctioned 20-day spring practice session. Michelosen welcomed a squad of 70, including 22 lettermen, to the drills. The Panthers concluded the session with a high school coaches clinic and an intrasquad scrimmage on April 23.

Pitt's opening game was on September 17 (earliest in history) and the NCAA ruled that fall practice started on September 1. The Panthers two-week preseason training took place on campus at Ellsworth Field for the fourth straight year.

== Game summaries ==
=== California ===
Week 1: California at Pitt

Team	1	2	3	4	Total
California	7	0	0	0	7
• Pitt	0	7	0	20	27

- Date: September 17, 1955
- Location: Pitt Stadium
  Pittsburgh, PA
- Game start: 1:30 p.m.
- Game attendance: 33,999–34,976
- Game weather: hot and humid
- Referee: Albert J. Booth Jr. (Yale)

Scoring summary
1	CAL	Bill Vallotton 30-yard pass from Hugh Maguire (Nick Poppin kick)	CAL 7–0
2	PITT	Bobby Grier 2-yard run (Darrell Lewis kick)	TIED 7– 7
4	PITT	Dick Bowen 6-yard pass from Corny Salvaterra ( Ambrose Bagamery kick)	PITT 14–7
4	PITT	Dick Bowen 10-yard run (John Paluck kick)	PITT 21–7
4	PITT	Bobby Grier 33-yard run (kick missed)	PITT 27–7

On September 17 – John Michelosen coached his first game as Pitt head coach; the California Golden Bears played the Pitt Panthers for the first time, and the Cal Bears opened their season on the road for the first time in their history. The Bears were coached for the ninth year by future College Football Hall of Famer Pappy Waldorf. They only returned 9 lettermen from their 5–5 previous season.

Pitt, with 22 lettermen returning, was a touchdown favorite. Coach Michelosen started 9 holdovers from the previous year. He replaced Al Bolcovac with Bill Schmitt at guard and Corny Salvaterra with Darrell Lewis at quarterback. A Hall of Fame ceremony took place at halftime for Bob Peck, Pitt's first All-American. The Sun-Telegraph published a map of parking lots available for game day parking.

With the temperature gauge reading 92 degrees, the Pitt Panthers opened the season with a 27–7 victory over the visiting Cal Bears. In the first quarter Cal recovered a Pitt fumble on their own 45-yard line. Their 55-yard scoring drive was capped with a 30-yard touchdown pass from Hugh Maguire to Bill Vallotton. Nick Poppin kicked the extra point. Pitt tied the score with seconds left in the first half on a 2-yard run by Bobby Grier, and an extra point by Darrell Lewis. After a scoreless third quarter, the Panthers ended a 66-yard drive with a 6-yard touchdown pass from Corny Salvaterra to Dick Bowen. Ambrose Bagamery converted the placement. Then Pitt end Fred Glatz recovered a fumble on the Cal 9-yard line. Bowen scored on first down, and John Paluck kicked the extra point. The final score was Bobby Grier's 33-yard run with less than five minutes to play. Pete Neft missed the extra point.

Even though they fumbled 8 times and lost 5, Pitt's offense earned 16 first downs and gained 355 yards. Their defense held Cal to 4 first downs and 85 yards. Bobby Grier (57 yards) and Corky Cost (56 yards) were Pitt's rushing leaders. Corny Salvaterra completed 5 of 9 passes for 81 yards.

The Pitt starting lineup for the game against California was Joe Walton (left end), Bob Pollock (left tackle), Harold Hunter (left guard), John Cenci (center), Bill Schmitt (right guard), Herman Canil (right tackle), John Paluck (right end), Darrell Lewis (quarterback), Corky Cost (left halfback), Lou Cimarolli (right halfback) and Bobby Grier (fullback). Substitutes appearing in the game for Pitt were Fred Glatz, Bob Kiesel, Jim McCusker, Howard Linn, Vince Scorsone, John Guzik, Ed Bose, Charles Brueckman, Don Agafon, Al Bolkovac, Dan Wisneiwski, Ronnie Kissel, Bob Rosborough, Dale Brown, Corny Salvaterra, Pete Neft, Jim Theodore, Dick Bowen, Ralph Jelic, Ray DiPasquale, Ambrose Bagamery, Tom Jenkins and Ralph Ciper.

=== at Syracuse ===
Week 2: Pitt at Syracuse

Team	1	2	3	4	Total
• Pitt	0	7	6	9	22
SYR	0	6	6	0	12

- Date: September 24, 1955
- Location: Archbold Stadium
  Syracuse, NY
- Game start: 1:30 p.m.
- Game attendance: 14,952
- Game weather: rain and fog
- Referee: Gerald F. Hogan (Arkansas)

Scoring summary
2	SYR	Jim Ridlon 16-yard pass from Ed Albright (Jim Brown missed kick)	SYR 6–0
2	PITT	Tom Jenkins 8-yard run (Ambrose Bagamery kick)	PITT 7– 6
3	SYR	Bill Micho 64-yard pass from Ed Albright ( Jim Brown missed wide left)	SYR 12–7
3	PITT	Joe Walton 25-yard pass from Corny Salvaterra (Bagamery missed kick)	PITT 13–12
4	PITT	Pete Neft 1-yard run (Bagamery kick)	PITT 20–12
4	PITT	Bob Rosborough tackled Fred Kuczala for a safety	PITT 22–12

On September 24, the Panthers traveled to upstate New York to play the Syracuse Orangemen. The teams last met in 1930, and the Panthers led the all-time series 6–2–2. Syracuse was led by seventh-year coach Ben Schwartzwalder. This was the Orangemen's opening game. Future Hall of Fame running back Jim Brown headlined the Syracuse lineup.

In spite of the rain and foggy weather, the #7 ranked Panthers won their second game in a row by beating the Orangemen 22–12. In the first period Syracuse advanced the ball to the Panthers 6-yard line, but the Panthers defense stiffened and took over on downs. In the second period, Pitt quarterback Darrell Lewis fumbled, and Syracuse recovered on the Pitt 26-yard line. On fourth and ten from the 16-yard line Ed Albright threw a touchdown pass to Jim Ridlon. Jim Brown missed the extra point. Pitt halfback Corky Cost returned the kick-off to the 34-yard line. The Panthers took 11 plays to travel 66 yards for the touchdown. Fullback Tom Jenkins scored from the 8-yard line, and Ambrose Bagamery added the extra point. Pitt led at halftime 7–6. Early in the third quarter Syracuse quarterback Albright completed a 64-yard pass to Bill Micho to put Syracuse back in the lead, 12–7, as Jim Brown's kick was wide left. Pitt gained possession on the Syracuse 31 after a Syracuse punt. On third down Corny Salvaterra threw a 25-yard touchdown pass to Joe Walton. Bagamery missed the extra point, but Pitt led again 13–12. Pitt guard Harold Hunter recovered a fumble on the ensuing kick-off, and the Pitt offense was back in control on the Syracuse 45-yard line. Pete Neft engineered an 11-play drive that he ended with a 1-yard quarterback sneak. Bagamery added the point after for a 20–12 Pitt lead. Pitt end Bob Rosborough ended the Pitt scoring by tackling Syracuse back Fred Kuczala in the end zone for a safety.

The Panthers gained 230 yards to 190 for Syracuse. Pitt's Dick Bowen ran 10 times for 46 yards; Corky Cost carried 6 times for 39 yards; Ralph Jelic and Tom Jenkins both ran 7 times for 27 yards. Corny Salvaterra completed 1 pass for 29 yards. The Panthers held Jim Brown to 28 yards on 12 carries.

The Pitt starting lineup for the game against Syracuse was Joe Walton (left end), Bob Pollock (left tackle), Harold Hunter (left guard), John Cenci (center), Bill Schmitt (right guard), Herman Canil (right tackle), John Paluck (right end), Corny Salvaterra (quarterback), Corky Cost (left halfback), Ralph Jelic (right halfback) and Bobby Grier (fullback). Substitutes appearing in the game for Pitt were Fred Glatz, Bob Kiesel, Jim McCusker, Howard Linn, Vince Scorsone, John Guzik, Ed Bose, Charles Brueckman, Al Bolkovac, Dan Wisneiwski, Ronnie Kissel, Bob Rosborough, Dale Brown, Darrell Lewis, Pete Neft, Dick Bowen, Ray DiPasquale, Ambrose Bagamery, Lou Cimarolli, Tom Jenkins and Ralph Ciper.

=== at Oklahoma ===
Week 3: Pitt at OKLA

Team	1	2	3	4	Total
Pitt	0	0	7	7	14
• OKLA	7	12	0	7	26

- Date: October 1, 1955
- Location: Owen Field
  Norman, OK
- Game start: 2:00 p.m.
- Game attendance: 55,412–58,000
- Game weather: hot and cloudy
- Referee: Ronald Gibbs (St. Thomas)

Scoring summary
1	OKLA	Tommy McDonald 43-yard run (Jim Harris kick)	OKLA 7–0
2	OKLA	Robert Burris 1-yard run (kick missed)	OKLA 13– 0
2	OKLA	Clendon Thomas 32-yard run (kick missed)	OKLA 19–0
3	PITT	Joe Walton 18-yard pass from Corny Salvaterra (Ambrose Bagamery kick)	OKLA 19–7
4	PITT	Corky Cost 1-yard run (Bagamery kick)	OKLA 19–14
4	OKLA	McDonald 8-yard run (Harris kick)	OKLA 26–14

On October 1, the Panthers traveled to Norman, Oklahoma to play Bud Wilkinson's Oklahoma Sooners. The Sooners were on a 20-game win streak, since Pitt tied them 7–7 in 1953. Oklahoma led the all-time series 1–0–1. The Sooners roster had six future All-Americans: halfbacks Tommy McDonald and Clendon Thomas, guards Bo Bolinger, Ed Gray and Bill Krisher and center Jerry Tubbs. They opened their season with a victory over North Carolina and were ranked #5.

After their opening victory over California, the Panthers were ranked #7. After beating Syracuse to go 2–0, they were ranked #12. The Panther contingent arrived in Norman on Friday afternoon by chartered plane. Coach Michelosen held a workout on Owen Field. They stayed in Norman at the Lockett Hotel. Coach Michelosen used the same starting lineup as the Syracuse game.

Oklahoma ran their winning streak to 21 with a 26–14 victory over the Panthers. Oklahoma scored three touchdowns in the first half to build a 19–0 halftime lead. Tommy McDonald ran 43-yards for the first touchdown. Robert Burris plunged in from the 1-yard line for the second score, and Clendon Thomas raced 32-yards for the third. Jim Harris converted one extra point. The Panther offense answered in the second half by scoring two unanswered touchdowns. The first was an 18-yard scoring pass from Corny Salvaterra to Joe Walton. Then Corky Cost capped a 10-play drive with a 1-yard run. Ambrose Bagamery was good on both placements, as Pitt cut the lead to 19–14. With less than 10 minutes remaining, the Panthers regained possession on their 20-yard line, but stalled on the 39 and had to punt. Oklahoma needed 8 plays for McDonald to score his second touchdown and run out the clock. Harris converted the placement.

Corny Salvaterra led the Pitt running attack with 67 yards on 13 carries. Corky Cost gained 51 yards on 13 carries. Salvaterra also completed 8 of 18 passes for 78 yards. Oklahoma's Tommy McDonald led all rushers with 124 yards on 11 carries, and he completed 2 of 5 passes for 39 yards.

The Pitt starting lineup for the game against Oklahoma was Joe Walton (left end), Bob Pollock (left tackle), Harold Hunter (left guard), John Cenci (center), Bill Schmitt (right guard), Herman Canil (right tackle), John Paluck (right end), Corny Salvaterra (quarterback), Corky Cost (left halfback), Ralph Jelic (right halfback) and Bobby Grier (fullback). Substitutes appearing in the game for Pitt were Fred Glatz, Jim McCusker, Howard Linn, Vince Scorsone, Ed Bose, Al Bolkovac, Ronnie Kissel, Bob Rosborough, Darrell Lewis, Pete Neft, Dick Bowen, Ray DiPasquale, Ambrose Bagamery, Lou Cimarolli, Nick Passodelis, Tom Jenkins and Ralph Ciper.

=== at Navy ===
Week 4: Pitt at NAVY

Team	1	2	3	4	Total
Pitt	0	0	0	0	0
• Navy	0	7	7	7	21

- Date: October 8, 1955
- Location: Memorial Stadium
  Baltimore, MD
- Game start: 2:00 p.m.
- Game attendance: 13,229–20,000
- Game weather: partly cloudy
- Referee: Albert Booth (Yale)

Scoring summary
1	NAVY	Jim Owen 7-yard pass from George Welsh (Edwin Oldham kick)	NAVY 7–0
3	NAVY	Dick Guest 4-yard run (Oldham kick)	NAVY 14–0
4	NAVY	Guest 3-yard run (Oldham kick)	NAVY 21–0

On October 8, the Panthers third road trip in a row was to Baltimore, MD to play the Midshipmen of the Naval Academy. Pitt upset the Eastern champion Middies 21–19 in 1954 and led the all-time series 6–1–1. The 1955 Sugar Bowl champs were led by sixth-year Coach Eddie Erdelatz. They opened their season 2–0 and were ranked #12. Ron Beagle (end) and George Welsh (quarterback) earned All-American honors.

Coach Michelosen made two changes to the starting lineup. Guard Herman Canil injured his knee against Oklahoma and was replaced by Ronnie Kissel, and Tom Jenkins replaced Bobby Grier at fullback.

Navy earned their revenge for the 1954 upset by shutting out the Panthers 21–0. The road-weary Panthers earned 4 first downs and gained a total of 59 yards. Quarterback Corny Salvaterra attempted 1 pass, and that was intercepted. Ted Jenkins gained 39 yards on 9 carries. Pitt recovered a fumble on the second play of the game on Navy's 35-yard line. They drove to the Navy 4-yard line and turned the ball over on downs. Then, Navy went 96-yards in 20 plays. George Welsh threw a 7-yard pass to Jim Owen for the score. Ned Oldham tacked on the extra point and Navy led 7–0 at halftime. Navy added two rushing touchdowns by Dick Guest and conversions by Oldham to pad their lead. Welsh completed 8 of 16 passes for 121 yards and the Middies rushed for 117 yards.

The Pitt starting lineup for the game against Navy was Joe Walton (left end), Bob Pollock (left tackle), Harold Hunter (left guard), John Cenci (center), Bill Schmitt (right guard), Ronnie Kissel (right tackle), John Paluck (right end), Corny Salvaterra (quarterback), Corky Cost (left halfback), Ray DiPasquale (right halfback) and Tom Jenkins (fullback). Substitutes appearing in the game for Pitt were Fred Glatz, Jim McCusker, Howard Linn, Vince Scorsone, Ed Bose, Charles Breuckman, Al Bolkovac, Bob Rosborough, Pete Neft, Dick Bowen, Ralph Jelic, Ambrose Bagamery, Lou Cimarolli, Nick Passodelis and Bobby Grier.

=== Nebraska ===
Week 5: Nebraska at Pitt

Team	1	2	3	4	Total
Nebraska	7	0	0	0	7
• Pitt	14	0	7	0	21

- Date: October 15, 1955
- Location: Pitt Stadium
  Pittsburgh, PA
- Game start: 1:30 p.m.
- Game attendance: 19,350–21,006
- Game weather: rain showers
- Referee: Leroy J. Kelley (Dartmouth)

Scoring summary
1	NEBR	Rex Fischer 3-yard run (Don Erway kick)	NEBR 7–0
2	PITT	Lou Cimarolli 1-yard run (Ambrose Bagamery kick)	TIED 7– 7
2	PITT	Nick Passodelis 5-yard run (Bagamery kick)	PITT 14–7
4	PITT	Joe Walton 10-yard from Pete Neft (Bagamery kick)	PITT 21–7

On October 15, after a month on the road, the Panthers played the Nebraska Cornhuskers at Pitt Stadium. The Huskers were 1–3 for the season, and the Panthers led the all-time series 13–3–3.

Coach Michelosen was not pleased with the effort against Navy, so he adjusted his lineup. Quarterback Pete Neft, guards Al Bolkovac and Vince Scarsone got their first starting assignment and halfback Lou Cimarolli was reinserted into the starting backfield.

Third-string quarterback Pete Neft made Michelosen look like a genius as he led the Panthers to three touchdowns and a 21–7 victory. Pitt end Joe Walton fumbled the opening kick-off, and the Huskers recovered on the Panther 42-yard line. Five plays later Husker back Rex Fischer scored from the 3-yard line. Don Erway added the extra point, and Pitt was trailing 7–0 less than four minutes into the contest. The Panthers answered with a 75-yard, 15-play drive to tie the score. Lou Cimarolli plunged the last yard for the touchdown, and Ambrose Bagamery made the placement. Pitt kicked off, and on the second play, Pitt center John Cenci, recovered a fumble on the Nebraska 26-yard line. On the fourth play, halfback Nick Passodelis ran the last 5-yards for the go-ahead score. Bagamery made the extra point and Pitt led 14–7 at halftime. The teams traded interceptions to start the third quarter. After Neft was intercepted, Panther back Dick Bowen reciprocated and returned the ball to the Panther 35-yard line. The 17-play drive ended with a 10-yard touchdown pass from Neft to Walton, and Bagamery's kick made it 21–7. Nebraska drove to the Panthers 28-yard line, and lost possession on a fumble. The Panthers were on the Huskers 26-yard line as time expired.

Pitt dominated statistically with 19 first downs to 9, and 307 total yards to 202. Bobby Grier led the Panthers with 46 yards rushing. Neft ran for 45 yards. Conversely, the Panthers fumbled 7 times, but only lost one.

The Pitt starting lineup for the game against Nebraska was Joe Walton (left end), Bob Pollock (left tackle), Vince Scorsone (left guard), John Cenci (center), Al Bolkovac (right guard), Herman Canil (right tackle), John Paluck (right end), Pete Neft (quarterback), Corky Cost (left halfback), Lou Cimarolli (right halfback) and Tom Jenkins (fullback). Substitutes appearing in the game for Pitt were Fred Glatz, Dale Brown, Jim McCusker, Harold Hunter, John Guzik, Ed Bose, Charles Breuckman, Bill Schmitt, Dan Wisniewski, Ronnie Kissel, Bob Rosborough, Corny Salvaterra, Darrell Lewis, Dick Bowen, Jim Theodore, Ralph Jelic, Ambrose Bagamery, Nick Passodelis, Ralph Ciper and Bobby Grier.

=== at Duke ===
Week 6: Pitt at Duke

Team	1	2	3	4	Total
• Pitt	0	6	7	13	26
Duke	0	7	0	0	7

- Date: October 22, 1955
- Location: Duke Stadium
  Durham, NC
- Game start: 2:30 p.m.
- Game attendance: 19,451–31,000
- Game weather: fair and cool
- Referee: Albert Booth (Yale)

Scoring summary
2	PITT	Joe Walton 36-yard pass from Corny Salvaterra (Ambrose Bagamery's kick went wide)	PITT 6–0
2	DUKE	Blaney 75-yard pass from Sonny Jurgensen (Jim Nelson kick)	DUKE 7– 6
3	PITT	Lou Cimarolli 1-yard run ( Bagamery kick)	PITT 13–7
4	PITT	Corky Cost 1-yard run (John Paluck's kick went wide)	PITT 19–7
4	PITT	Joe Walton 16-yard pass from Darrell Lewis (Bagamery kick)	PITT 26–7

On October 22, the Panthers were on the road again. Their destination was Durham, NC to play the #5 Duke Blue Devils in their Homecoming game. Duke, led by coach William D. Murray and quarterback Sonny Jurgensen, was looking to extend its 8-game win streak, which included the 1955 Orange Bowl. Duke led the all-time series 6–3.

The Panthers chartered flight was late taking off from Pittsburgh, causing the Panthers to forgo their usual "day before practice" on the opponent's field. The Sun-Telegraph noted that the same circumstance occurred the previous week to Duke on their trip to Ohio State, and the Devils ended up winning the game. Coach Michelosen started Dick Bowen at left halfback.

The Panthers did not need the "day before practice", as they upset the Blue Devils 26–7. The Panthers scored first. After a scoreless first quarter, Pitt blocked a Bob Hagle punt and recovered on their own 49-yard line. On the third play, Corny Salvaterra completed a 35-yard touchdown pass to Joe Walton. Ambrose Bagamery's extra point was wide. Duke answered with a 75-yard touchdown pass from Sonny Jurgensen to Bunny Blaney, and placement from Jim Nelson for a 7–6 halftime lead. The first time they had possession in the third period, Pitt drove 56 yards in 7 plays for the go-ahead touchdown. Lou Cimarolli capped the drive with 1-yard plunge. Bagamerey converted the extra point, and Pitt led 13–7. The Panthers were able to score two touchdowns in the final period, while their defense frustrated the Devils' offense. Pitt tackle Herman Canil recovered one of Duke's four lost fumbles on the Devils' 33-yard line. Corky Cost scored from 1-yard out on the sixth play of the drive. John Paluck missed the extra point. The final score was a 15-yard touchdown pass from Darrell Lewis to Joe Walton with 20 seconds remaining. Bagamery converted to make it 26–7.

Pitt had 15 first downs to 10 for the Blue Devils. The Panthers gained 321 total yards and gave up 204. Quarterback Pete Neft ran for 69 yards on 5 carries, and Dick Bowen ran for 65 yards on 10 carries. Joe Walton caught 2 passes for 52 yards and 2 touchdowns. Duke quarterback Sonny Jurgensen completed 6 of 9 passes for 166 yards.

The Pitt starting lineup for the game against Duke was Joe Walton (left end), Bob Pollock (left tackle), Vince Scorsone (left guard), John Cenci (center), Al Bolkovac (right guard), Herman Canil (right tackle), John Paluck (right end), Pete Neft (quarterback), Corky Cost (left halfback), Lou Cimarolli (right halfback) and Bobby Grier (fullback). Substitutes appearing in the game for Pitt were Fred Glatz, Bob Kiesel, Jim McCusker, Harold Hunter, John Guzik, Ed Bose, Charles Breuckman, Bill Schmitt, Dan Wisniewski, Ronnie Kissel, Bob Rosborough, Dale Brown, Gordon Oliver, Corny Salvaterra, Darrell Lewis, Dick Bowen, Ralph Jelic, Ambrose Bagamery, Ray DiPasquale, Nick Passodelis, Ralph Ciper and Bobby Grier.

=== Miami (FL) ===
Week 7: Miami at Pitt

Team	1	2	3	4	Total
• Miami	14	0	0	7	21
Pitt	0	7	0	0	7

- Date: October 29, 1955
- Location: Pitt Stadium
  Pittsburgh, PA
- Game start: 1:30 p.m.
- Game attendance: 37,230–40,117
- Game weather: showers
- Referee: Albert J. Booth Jr. (Yale)

Scoring summary
1	MIA	John Varone 31-yard run (Jack Losch pass from Sam Scarnecchia)	MIA 7–0
2	MIA	Losch 41-yard pass from Scarecchia (Ed Oliver kick)	MIA 14– 0
4	PITT	Tom Jenkins 1-yard run (Ambrose Bagamery kick)	MIA 14–7
4	MIA	Scarnecchia 1-yard run (Bob Nolan kick)	MIA 21–7

On October 29, Pitt's homecoming opponent was the Miami Hurricanes. The all-time homecoming series was tied 1–1. Miami ruined Pitt's homecoming in 1950, and Pitt returned the favor in 1951. Miami was 1–3 on the season, having lost to Notre Dame, Georgia Tech and TCU. Miami Coach Andy Gustafson's roster had 13 players from Pennsylvania.

The Panthers followed their usual home routine of walk-through practice on Friday, and then staying at the Penn-Lincoln Hotel in Wilkinsburg until game time.

The 37,230 fans sat through both rain and bright sunshine, and were entertained at pre-game and halftime by Homecoming floats, majorettes, Boy Scouts and 200 members of the Orange Bowl committee. Game-wise, Miami ruined the Panthers Homecoming again with a decisive 21–7 victory. Miami scored twice in the first quarter. On their first possession they drove 76-yards in 9 plays. John Varone raced 31-yards around left end for the touchdown. Miami quarterback Sam Scarnecchia passed to Jack Losch for the extra point. The Miami defense forced Pitt to punt. The Panthers were penalized 15 yards for interfering with a fair catch, and Miami had possession on the Panthers 41-yard line. On first down Scarnecchia connected with Losch for a 41-yard touchdown pass. Bob Nolan booted the extra point and Pitt trailed 14–0. Pitt made the score respectable with a 1-yard plunge by Tom Jenkins and placement by Ambrose Bagamery with less than a minute left in the first half. The second half was scoreless until Miami added an insurance touchdown with 18 seconds to go in the game. Scarnecchia ran a quarterback keeper from the 3-yard line, and Ed Oliver added the placement.

The Pitt starting lineup for the game against Miami was Joe Walton (left end), Bob Pollock (left tackle), Vince Scorsone (left guard), John Cenci (center), Al Bolkovac (right guard), Herman Canil (right tackle), John Paluck (right end), Pete Neft (quarterback), Dick Bowen (left halfback), Lou Cimarolli (right halfback) and Bobby Grier (fullback). Substitutes appearing in the game for Pitt were Fred Glatz, Dale Brown, Jim McCusker, Harold Hunter, John Guzik, Ed Bose, Bill Schmitt, Dan Wisniewski, Ronnie Kissel, Bob Rosborough, Corny Salvaterra, Darrell Lewis, Corky Cost, Jim Theodore, Ralph Jelic, Ambrose Bagamery, Ray DiPasquale and Tom Jenkins.

=== Virginia ===
Week 8: Virginia at Pitt

Team	1	2	3	4	Total
Virginia	0	7	0	0	7
• Pitt	6	0	6	6	18

- Date: November 5, 1955
- Location: Pitt Stadium
  Pittsburgh, PA
- Game start: 1:30 p.m.
- Game attendance: 18,867–21,938
- Game weather: cloudy
- Referee: Gerald F. Hogan (Arkansas)

Scoring summary
1	PITT	Joe Walton 18-yard pass from Pete Neft (bad center snap on extra point )	PITT 6–0
2	VIRG	Ralph Kneeland 8-yard run (Jim Bakhtiar kick)	VIR 7– 6
3	PITT	Lou Cimarolli 32-yard run ( kick missed)	PITT 12–7
4	PITT	Walton 14-yard pass from Neft (kick missed)	PITT 18–7

On November 5, the Panthers played the Virginia Cavaliers. This was the second game in the series, with Pitt having beaten the Cavaliers 26–0 in 1953. Third-year Coach Ned McDonald's Cavaliers were 1–5 on the season, having beaten only winless VMI. Virginia's leading rusher, Herb Hartwell, did not play. The attendance was bolstered by High School Day and Band Day promotions. 26 high school bands (over 2,000 musicians) performed at halftime, and approximately 6,500 high school and middle school students took advantage of reduced ticket prices to enjoy the game.

Coach Michelosen altered the interior line. Right guard Al Bolkovac injured his hip and did not play. Center John Cenci moved to right guard and Ed Bose started at center. Harold Hunter replaced Vince Scarsone at left guard. The Panthers were three-touchdown favorites.

Pitt managed to do enough to beat the Cavaliers 18–7. The Panthers' defense recovered 3 fumbles, intercepted two passes and blocked two punts. Joe Walton blocked a punt in the first quarter that led to his 18-yard touchdown reception from Pete Neft. The Panthers converted no extra points. The Cavaliers answered with a touchdown in the second period. Virginia drove 88-yards, with Ralph Kneeland running inside right end from the 8-yard line for the score. Jim Bakhtiar booted the point after and Virginia led 7–6 at halftime. The Panthers regained the lead late in the third quarter on a 61-yard drive. Lou Cimarolli ran 32 yards around left end for the score. In the final quarter, Pete Neft hit Walton with a 14-yard touchdown pass to close out the scoring. Joe Walton broke Chris Warriner's record of 5 career touchdown catches. Walton broke the record with his first quarter reception and padded his record with the last quarter catch. Through 8 games Walton had 9 receptions and 7 resulted in touchdowns.

The Pitt starting lineup for the game against Virginia was Joe Walton (left end), Bob Pollock (left tackle), Harold Hunter (left guard), Ed Bose (center), John Cenci (right guard), Ronnie Kissel (right tackle), John Paluck (right end), Pete Neft (quarterback), Dick Bowen (left halfback), Ray DiPasquale (right halfback) and Tom Jenkins (fullback). Substitutes appearing in the game for Pitt were Fred Glatz, Bob Kiesel, Dale Brown, Jim McCusker, Don Agafon, Vince Scorsone, John Guzik, Charles Breuckman, Bill Schmitt, Dan Wisniewski, Howard Linn, Bob Rosborough, Corny Salvaterra, Darrell Lewis, Corky Cost, Jim Theodore, Lou Cimarolli, Ralph Jelic, Ambrose Bagamery, Nick Passodelis, Ralph Ciper and Bobby Grier.

=== West Virginia ===
Week 9: West Virginia at Pitt

Team	1	2	3	4	Total
West Virginia	0	0	0	7	7
• Pitt	7	0	12	7	26

- Date: November 12, 1955
- Location: Pitt Stadium
  Pittsburgh, PA
- Game start: 1:30 p.m.
- Game attendance: 55,772–57,996
- Game weather: sunny and warm

Scoring summary
1	PITT	Joe Walton 6-yard pass from Pete Neft (Ambrose Bagamery kick )	PITT 7–0
3	PITT	Pete Neft 7-yard run (kick missed)	PITT 13– 0
3	PITT	Tom Jenkins 1-yard run (kick missed)	VIR 19– 0
4	PITT	Darrell Lewis 6-yard run ( John Paluck kick)	PITT 26–0
4	WVU	Joe Marconi 5-yard run (referee's award)	PITT 26–7

On November 12, the Backyard Brawl featured the unbeaten #6 West Virginia Mountaineers against the #17 Pitt Panthers. Pitt led the all-time series 35–11–1. The revenge-minded Mountaineers were unbeaten and awaiting a bowl bid last year, but Pitt scored in the last 2 minutes for the upset that ruined their season. West Virginia was favored again, and bowl reps from the Gator Bowl and Sugar Bowl were in attendance. Coach Art Lewis's line-up featured All-American tackles Bruce Bosley and Sam Huff, plus future pro, fullback Joe Marconi.

The Panthers injured linemen were healthy. Coach Michelosen put guard Al Bolkovac and tackle Herman Canil back in the starting lineup, and John Cenci moved back to center. Fullback Bobby Grier did not play.

History repeated as the Panthers upset the Mountaineers' dream season 26–7. After an exchange of punts, the Panthers drove 63-yards for the opening touchdown. Halfback Dick Bowen's 38-yard run through tackle to the 8-yard line was the highlight of the drive. Joe Walton scored on a 6-yard pass from Pete Neft. Ambrose Bagamery's placement made it 7–0 Pitt. The rest of the first half was scoreless. The Panthers scored twice in the early minutes of the third quarter. A fumble by West Virginia quarterback Fred Wyant was recovered by John Paluck on the Mountaineers' 25-yard line. The short drive ended with a 7-yard quarterback keeper play touchdown by Pete Neft. Bagamery missed the extra point. On the second play after the kick-off, West Virginia fumbled again, and Joe Walton recovered for Pitt on the Mountaineers' 24-yard line. On first down, Corny Salvaterra ran to the 1-yard line. Then fullback Tom Jenkins went over center to up the lead to 19–0. The Panthers third string managed a 78-yard drive in 9 plays for the final Pitt touchdown. Darrell Lewis scored on a 6-yard quarterback sneak. John Paluck added the extra point, to supposedly close out the scoring, with 96 seconds left. However, the Pitt defense was flagged for pass interference, and West Virginia had the ball on the Pitt 21-yard line with time for one last play. The pass fell incomplete, and the Panther faithful stormed the field and tore down the goal posts. But, there was a flag on the play for pass interference. The officials cleared the field for one more play. Mountaineer halfback Joe Marconi scored around left end from the 6-yard line. The goal posts were gone, so the officials forfeited an extra point to West Virginia. Pitt 26 –West Virginia 7.

Coach Michelosen praised his team: “They made up their minds to play a good game against a good team and won. It was a great team win. Nothing fancy. Just good football.” Dick Bowen led the Pitt ground game with 59 yards on 5 carries and Lou Cimarolli added 47 yards on 5 carries. The Pitt defense stifled the Mountaineers passing game, as they only completed 4 of 23.

The Pitt starting lineup for the game against West Virginia was Joe Walton (left end), Bob Pollock (left tackle), Harold Hunter (left guard), John Cenci (center), Al Bolkovac (right guard), Herman Canil (right tackle), John Paluck (right end), Pete Neft (quarterback), Dick Bowen (left halfback), Lou Cimarolli (right halfback) and Tom Jenkins (fullback). Substitutes appearing in the game for Pitt were Fred Glatz, Bob Kiesel, Dale Brown, Jim McCusker, Don Agafon, Vince Scorsone, John Guzik, Ed Bose, Bill Schmitt, Dan Wisniewski, Ronnie Kissel, Bob Rosborough, Charles Breuckman, Corny Salvaterra, Darrell Lewis, Corky Cost, Jim Theodore, Dick Manson, Ralph Jelic, Ambrose Bagamery, Ray DiPasquale, Nick Passodelis and Ralph Ciper.

=== at Penn State ===
Week 10: Pitt at Penn State

Team	1	2	3	4	Total
• Pitt	0	7	7	6	20
Penn State	0	0	0	0	0

- Date: November 19, 1955
- Location: New Beaver Field
  State College, PA
- Game start: 1:30 p.m.
- Game attendance: 28,361–31,200
- Game weather: snow
- Referee: William T. Halloran

Scoring summary
2	PITT	Pete Neft 1-yard run (Ambrose Bagamery kick)	PITT 7–0
3	PITT	Bobby Grier 2-yard run (Ambrose Bagamery kick)	PITT 14–0
4	PITT	Corny Salvaterra 62-yard run (kick missed)	PITT 20–0

The final game of the regular season against Penn State was played in State College, PA because the Nittanies were having their Centennial celebration. Pitt led the all-time series 30–22–2. Rip Engle's squad was 5–3 for the season, and had shut out the favored Panthers the past three seasons. Future pros, halfback Lenny Moore and quarterback Milt Plum, led the State offense.

The Panthers needed a win for a possible invitation to the Sugar Bowl or Gator Bowl. If they won, it would be the best record for the Panthers since John Sutherland's departure in 1938, and Pitt would regain possession of Old Ironsides for being district champions.

28,361 fans sat through an all day snowstorm to watch the Panthers shut out the Lions 20–0. The Panthers scored on the Lions, “after three years, 26 minutes and ten seconds,” in the second quarter. On fourth down, quarterback Pete Neft finished the 32-yard drive with a 1-yard sneak, and Ambrose Bagamery added the point for a 7–0 halftime lead. At the start of the third period, Penn State gained possession on the Panthers 23-yard line. The Pitt defense held and took over on downs on their 24-yard line. Neft directed the 76-yard drive, and Bobby Grier ran the final 2-yards for the touchdown. Bagamery converted and Pitt led 14–0. Penn State answered with an offensive drive to the Panthers 8-yard line. The Panthers defense held again and took over on downs. In the final quarter, State halfback Lenny Moore fumbled and Pitt recovered on their 38-yard line. Second -string quarterback Corny Salvaterra scampered 62-yards for the final score (longest scoring run of the season).

Coach Michelosen enjoyed the outcome: “Those three zeros for three years were in our seniors minds. It's nice to have the zero on the other side of the fence for a change.” And assessing the season he told the Post-Gazette: “It's just been all for one and one for all – a real fine experience.”

The Pitt starting lineup for the game against Penn State was Joe Walton (left end), Bob Pollock (left tackle), Harold Hunter (left guard), John Cenci (center), Al Bolkovac (right guard), Herman Canil (right tackle), John Paluck (right end), Pete Neft (quarterback), Dick Bowen (left halfback), Lou Cimarolli (right halfback) and Tom Jenkins (fullback). Substitutes appearing in the game for Pitt were Fred Glatz, Bob Kiesel, Dale Brown, Jim McCusker, Don Agafon, Howard Linn, Vince Scorsone, John Guzik, Ed Bose, Bill Schmitt, Dan Wisniewski, Ronnie Kissel, Bob Rosborough, Charles Breuckman, Corny Salvaterra, Darrell Lewis, Corky Cost, Ambrose Bagamery, Ray DiPasquale, Nick Passodelis, Bobby Grier and Ralph Ciper.

=== Sugar Bowl: Georgia Tech ===
Sugar Bowl: Pittsburgh vs. Georgia Tech

Team	1	2	3	4	Total
Pittsburgh (7–3)	0	0	0	0	0
• Georgia Tech (8–1–1)	7	0	0	0	7

- Date: January 2, 1956
- Location: Tulane Stadium
  New Orleans, LA
- Game start: 1:00 p.m.
- Game attendance: 76,535–80,175
- Game weather: cloudy
- Referee: John Coles (Westminster)

Scoring summary
1	TECH	Wade Mitchell 1-yard quarterback sneak (Wade Mitchell kick)	TECH 7–0

On November 22, 1955, the Pitt Panthers accepted an invitation to play in 1956 Sugar Bowl, contested on January 2 at New Orleans. The contract was for $160,000.

Pitt fullback Bobby Grier was the first Afro-American to actually play in the Sugar Bowl. In the 1941 edition, Boston College halfback Lou Montgomery had not been allowed to take the field. The Sun-Telegraph reported: “ Sugar Bowl officials already have said that they placed no restrictions whatsoever on Pitt concerning the possibility of Grier's playing. Furthermore, Sugar Bowl General Manager Fred Digby said Pitt is free to sell tickets to Negroes and the tickets no longer will be stamped 'to be used only by members of the caucasian race.' The Pitt stands will be unsegrated, (sic) but the rest of the 82,289 seat Tulane Stadium will be segregated, as in the past.”

Coach Bobby Dodd's Jackets were 8–1–1 on the season, having only lost to Auburn 14–12. The Yellow Jackets were undefeated in six previous bowl games under Coach Dodd. Pitt led the all-time series 3–0, but they had not played since 1920.

Georgia Tech won the game 7–0. In the opening quarter, the Jackets recovered a Pitt fumble on the Panthers 32-yard line. A controversial pass interference call against Bobby Grier in the end zone placed the ball on the 1-yard line. A Wade Mitchell quarterback sneak and a Michell extra point was all the scoring the 76,535 spectators would see. The Pitt Panthers dominated the statistics. On the plus side, they rushed for 217 yards and gained 94 yards passing. Tech rushed for 142 yards and did not complete a pass. Pitt made 19 first downs to 10 for Tech. Pitt ran 24 more plays than Tech. On the negative side, the Panthers were penalized 72 yards, fumbled four times and lost 2 of them, and had 1 pass intercepted. Additionally, the stadium clock did not work so the officials on the field kept time. The clock ran out in the first half with the Panthers on the Tech 1-yard line. The Panthers were on the Tech 5-yard line at the conclusion of the game.

The Pitt starting lineup for the game against Georgia Tech was Joe Walton (left end), Bob Pollock (left tackle), Vince Scorsone (left guard), John Cenci (center), Al Bolkovac (right guard), Herman Canil (right tackle), John Paluck (right end), Pete Neft (quarterback), Corky Cost (left halfback), Lou Cimarolli (right halfback) and Tom Jenkins (fullback). Substitutes appearing in the game for Pitt were Fred Glatz, Bob Kiesel, Jim McCusker, Howard Linn, Harold Hunter, John Guzik, Ed Bose, Bill Schmitt, Dan Wisniewski, Ronnie Kissel, Bob Rosborough, Charles Breuckman, Corny Salvaterra, Darrell Lewis, Dick Bowen, Ray DiPasquale, Nick Passodelis, Bobby Grier and Ralph Jelic.

== Postseason ==
The Panthers graduated 15 players off their roster, 12 of whom played significant minutes - Bobby Grier, Howard Linn, Pete Neft, John Cenci, John Paluck, Bill Schmitt, Fred Glatz, Al Bolkovac, Harold Hunter, Ed Bose, Lou Cimarolli, Don Agafon, Dick Manson, Paul Kacik and Don Michaels.

Joe Walton and John Paluck received All-American mentions.

Pitt was the recipient of the Lambert Trophy, which annually goes to the best team in the East.

Center John Cenci and end John Paluck played in the Senior Bowl in Mobile, AL.

== Personnel ==
=== Coaching staff ===
1955 Pittsburgh Panthers football staff
Coaching staff: John Michelosen – head coach; Jack Wiley – head line coach; Victor Fusia – backfield coach; Robert Timmons – end coach; Ernie Hefferle – offensive line coach; Steve Petro – freshman coach; Walter Cummins– assistant freshman coach	Support staff: Thomas J. Hamilton – athletic director; Walter P. Cummins – assistant athletic director; Robert Wycoff – athletic news service director; Bill Smith - team doctor; Howard Waite – trainer; Roger McGill – assistant trainer; Barry Fisher – student manager

=== Roster ===
1955 Pittsburgh Panthers football roster
Player	Position	Games	Weight	Height	Class	Prep School	Hometown
Charles Abrachinsky	fullback	0	190	5 ft 11 in	sophomore	Mahonoy H. S.	Shenandoah, PA
Don Agafon*	tackle	5	220	6 ft 1 in	senior	Berwick H.S.	Berwick, PA
Bill Amos	quarterback	0	190	6 ft 1 in	junior	Washington H. S./Univ. of Maryland	Washington, PA
Ambrose Bagamery*	halfback	9	180	6 ft	junior	Zelienople H. S.	Zelienople, PA
Al Bolkovac*	guard	10	200	6 ft	senior	Woodrow Wilson H. S.	Youngstown, OH
Ed Bose*	center	11	210	6 ft	senior	Old Westbury H. S.	Westbury, NY
Dick Bowen*	quarterback	11	180	6 ft	sophomore	Duquesne H. S.	White Oak, PA
Dale Brown*	end	8	185	6 ft	junior	Lincoln H. S.	Elwood City, PA
Charles Brueckman*	center	9	200	6 ft 2 in	junior	Stowe Township H. S.	McKees Rocks, PA
Herman Canil*	tackle	10	200	6 ft 1 in	junior	Vandergrift H. S.	Vandergrift, PA
Dick Carr	guard	0	210	6 ft 1 in	sophomore	Stonewall Jackson H. S.	Charleston, WV
John Cenci*	center	11	210	5 ft 11 in	senior	Schenley H. S.	Pittsburgh, PA
Lou Cimarolli*	halfback	11	170	5 ft 11 in	senior	Bridgeville H. S.	Bridgeville, PA
Ralph Ciper*	fullback	8	190	5 ft 10 in	junior	Ambridge H. S.	Ambridge, PA
Charles Cost*	halfback	11	170	5 ft 9 in	junior	Wilkinsburg H. S.	Wilkinsburg, PA
Don Crafton	center	0	185	6 ft	sophomore	Donora H. S.	Donora, PA
Ray DiPasquale*	halfback	10	185	5 ft 10 in	junior	Central Catholic H. S.	Pittsburgh, PA
Fred Glatz*	end	11	190	6 ft 1 in	senior	Central Catholic H. S.	Pittsburgh, PA
Bob Grier*	fullback	10	200	6 ft 1 in	senior	Washington H. S.	Massillon, OH
John Guzik	guard	7	210	6 ft 3 in	sophomore	Cecil Twp. H. S.	Cecil Twp., PA
Ed Humeston	end	0	200	6 ft 2 in	sophomore	Washington Irving H. S.	Clarksburg, WV
Harold Hunter*	guard	11	200	6 ft 1 in	senior	Canonsburg H. S.	Canonsburg, PA
Ralph Jelic*	fullback	10	195	6 ft	junior	South Hills H. S.	Pittsburgh, PA
Tom Jenkins*	fullback	11	185	6 ft	junior	Mercersburg Academy	East Liverpool, OH
Paul Kacik	end	0	185	6 ft 1 in	senior	Monessen H. S.	Monessen, PA
Bob Kiesel	fullback	10	210	6 ft	junior	Scranton Central H. S.	Scranton, PA
Ronnie Kissel*	tackle	9	235	6 ft 2 in	sophomore	McKeesport Technical H. S.	McKeesport, PA
Jim Lenhart	quarterback	0	190	6 ft 1 in	junior	Charleroi H. S.	Fairmont, WV
Darrell Lewis*	quarterback	10	185	5 ft 10 in	junior	Wilkinsburg H. S	Wilkinsburg, PA
Howard Linn	tackle	7	205	6 ft	senior	Steubenville H.S.	Steubenville, OH
Joe Mazur	left end	0	190	5 ft 10 in	junior	Trafford H. S.	Trafford, PA
Dick Manson	halfback	1	190	5 ft 10 in	senior	Franklin H. S.	Franklin, PA
Dan McCann	quarterback	0	190	6 ft 2 in	sophomore	North Catholic H. S.	Pittsburgh, PA
Jim McCusker*	tackle	11	235	6 ft 2 in	sophomore	Jamestown H. S.	Jamestown, NY
Don Michaels	fullback	0	190	6 ft	senior	Beaverdale H. S.	Beaverdale, PA
Pete Neft*	quarterback	11	175	6 ft	senior	Peabody H. S.	Pittsburgh, PA
Gordon Oliver	end	0	185	6 ft	sophomore	Punxsutawney H. S.	Punxsutawney, PA
Charles Palla	end	0	205	6 ft 1 in	sophomore	Scranton Central H. S.	Scranton, PA
Joe Paluck*	end	11	215	6 ft 1 in	senior	Swoyersville H. S.	Swoyersville, PA
Nick Passodelis*	halfback	8	180	5 ft 10 in	junior	Aliquippa H. S.	Aliquippa, PA
Bob Pollock*	tackle	11	215	6 ft 2 in	junior	Mt. Carmel H. S.	Mt. Carmel, PA
Bob Rosborough*	end	10	185	6 ft 1 in	junior	Donora H. S.	Donora, PA
James Sabatini	center	0	200	6 ft 1 in	sophomore	Wilkes-Barre H. S.	Plains, PA
Cornelius Salvaterra*	quarterback	11	190	6 ft	junior	GAR Memorial H. S.	Wilkes-Barre, PA
Dick Scherer	end	0	200	6 ft 1 in	junior	North Catholic H. S.	Pittsburgh, PA
William Schmitt*	guard	11	215	6 ft 1 in	senior	South Hills H. S.	Pittsburgh, PA
Vince Scorsone*	guard	11	220	6 ft	junior	McKeesport Technical H. S.	McKeesport, PA
John Stock	end	0	220	6 ft 2 in	sophomore	Carnegie H. S.	Carnegie, PA
Jim Theodore	halfback	6	175	5 ft 10 in	sophomore	Westinghouse Memorial H. S.	Wilmerding, PA
Eugene Uhlman	tackle	0	190	6 ft	sophomore	Charleroi H. S.	Charleroi, PA
Bob Verna	fullback	0	217	6 ft	junior	Conemough Twp. H. S.	Jerome, PA
Bill Walinchus	tackle	0	215	6 ft 2 in	sophomore	Mahanoy City H.S.	Mahanoy City, PA
Joe Walton*	end	11	215	5 ft 11 in	junior	Beaver Falls H. S.	Beaver Falls, PA
Dan Wisniewski*	guard	8	205	5 ft 11 in	junior	Erie East H. S.	Erie, PA
* Letterman

== Individual scoring summary ==
1955 Pittsburgh Panthers scoring summary
Player	Touchdowns	Extra points	Field goals	Safety	Points
Joe Walton	8	0	0	0	48
Pete Neft	3	0	0	0	18
Tom Jenkins	3	0	0	0	18
Bobby Grier	3	0	0	0	18
Lou Cimarolli	3	0	0	0	18
Ambrose Bagamery	0	14	0	0	14
Dick Bowen	2	0	0	0	12
Corky Cost	2	0	0	0	12
Darrell Lewis	1	1	0	0	7
Corny Salvaterra	1	0	0	0	6
Nick Passodelis	1	0	0	0	6
John Paluck	0	2	0	0	2
Bob Rosborough	0	0	0	1	2
Totals	27	17	0	1	181

== Team players drafted into the NFL ==
The following players were selected in the 1956 NFL draft.

Player	Position	Round	Pick	NFL club
John Paluck	Defensive end	2	24	Washington Redskins
Bill Schmitt	Guard	17	196	Pittsburgh Steelers
Fred Glatz	Back	20	231	Pittsburgh Steelers
Ray DiPasquale	Back	22	255	Pittsburgh Steelers
Pete Neft	Quarterback	23	268	Pittsburgh Steelers
