= 1955 Juniata Indians football team =

American college football season

1955 Juniata Indians football

Tangerine Bowl, T 6–6 vs. Missouri Valley
- Conference: Independent
- Record: 8–0–1
- Head coach: Robert C. Hicks (2nd season)
- Captain: Barry Drexler
- Home stadium: College Field

1955 Eastern college football independents records
| | Conf. | | | Overall |
| Team | W | L | T | W | | L | | T |
|---|---|---|---|---|---|---|---|---|
| Alfred | | – | | 8 | – | 0 | – | 0 |
| Drexel | | – | | 8 | – | 0 | – | 0 |
| Trinity (CT) | | – | | 7 | – | 0 | – | 0 |
| Juniata | | – | | 8 | – | 0 | – | 1 |
| Carnegie Tech | | – | | 5 | – | 1 | – | 1 |
| Tufts | | – | | 5 | – | 2 | – | 0 |
| Boston College | | – | | 5 | – | 2 | – | 1 |
| No. 20 Army | | – | | 6 | – | 3 | – | 0 |
| Colgate | | – | | 6 | – | 3 | – | 0 |
| No. 11 Pittsburgh | | – | | 7 | – | 4 | – | 0 |
| Holy Cross | | – | | 6 | – | 4 | – | 0 |
| Syracuse | | – | | 5 | – | 3 | – | 0 |
| Penn State | | – | | 5 | – | 4 | – | 0 |
| Buffalo | | – | | 4 | – | 4 | – | 1 |
| Hofstra | | – | | 3 | – | 6 | – | 0 |
| Bucknell | | – | | 2 | – | 6 | – | 1 |
| Boston University | | – | | 2 | – | 6 | – | 0 |
| Franklin & Marshall | | – | | 2 | – | 6 | – | 0 |
| Villanova | | – | | 1 | – | 9 | – | 0 |
| Temple | | – | | 0 | – | 8 | – | 0 |
Rankings from AP Poll

The 1955 Juniata Indians football team was an American football team that represented Juniata College as an independent during the 1955 college football season. In their second and final year under head coach Robert C. Hicks, the Indians compiled a perfect 8–0 record in the regular season and outscored opponents by a total of 240 to 32. They were then invited to play in the 1956 Tangerine Bowl, playing Missouri Valley to a 6–6 tie.

Juniata's triple-threat tailback Pat Tarquinio totaled 1,115 yards of total offense (789 passing yards, 326 rushing yards) during the regular season. End and captain Barry Drexler caught 26 passes for 623 yards and 10 touchdowns.

The 1955 season was part of a seven-year run from 1953 to 1959 during which Juniata compiled a record of 50–2–2, including five undefeated seasons.

The team played its home games at College Field in Huntingdon, Pennsylvania.

== Schedule ==
| Date | Time | Opponent | Site | Result | Attendance | Source |
|---|---|---|---|---|---|---|
| October 1 | | at Moravian | Bethlehem, PA | W 14–6 | | |
| October 8 | | at Haverford | Walton Field; Haverford, PA | W 7–0 | | |
| October 15 | | Lycoming | College Field; Huntingdon, PA | W 14–13 | | |
| October 22 | | at Dickinson | Biddle Field; Carlisle, PA | W 27–7 | 3,500 | |
| October 29 | | Susquehanna | College Field; Huntingdon, PA | W 54–0 | | |
| November 5 | | Grove City | College Field; Huntingdon, PA | W 47–0 | | |
| November 12 | | Swarthmore | College Field; Huntingdon, PA | W 39–0 | | |
| November 19 | | Ursinus | College Field; Huntingdon, PA | W 38–6 | | |
| January 2, 1956 | 8:00 p.m. | vs. Missouri Valley | Tangerine Bowl; Orlando, FL (Tangerine Bowl) | T 6–6 | 10,000 | |
All times are in Central time
