= 1955 Columbia Lions football team =

American college football season

1955 Columbia Lions football
- Conference: Ivy League
- Record: 1–8 (1–5 Ivy)
- Head coach: Lou Little (26th season)
- Captain: Manfredo Bucci
- Home stadium: Baker Field

1955 Ivy League football standings
	Conf.					Overall
Team	W		L		T	W		L		T
Princeton	6	–	1	–	0	7	–	2	–	0
Yale	5	–	1	–	0	7	–	2	–	0
Dartmouth	3	–	3	–	0	3	–	6	–	0
Cornell	4	–	3	–	0	5	–	4	–	0
Harvard	2	–	4	–	0	3	–	4	–	1
Brown	2	–	4	–	0	2	–	6	–	0
Columbia	1	–	5	–	0	1	–	8	–	0
Penn	0	–	1	–	0	0	–	8	–	0
The Ivy League did not crown an official champion until 1956 when full league play began.

The 1955 Columbia Lions football team was an American football team that represented Columbia University as an independent during the 1955 college football season.

In their 26th season under head coach Lou Little, the Lions compiled a 1–8 record, and were outscored 251 to 74. Manfredo Bucci was the team captain.

This would be Columbia's final year as a football independent, as the Ivy League, which Columbia had helped co-found in 1954, began football competition in 1956. Six of the nine opponents on Columbia's 1955 schedule were Ivy League members (with Penn the only Ivy not scheduled); for decades, (future) Ivy members had comprised a large portion of Columbia's opponents.

Columbia played its home games at Baker Field in Upper Manhattan, in New York City.

== Schedule ==
Date	Opponent	Site	Result	Attendance	Source
September 24	Brown	Baker Field; New York, NY	W 14–12	8,000	
October 1	at Princeton	Palmer Stadium; Princeton, NJ	L 7–20	15,500	
October 8	at Yale	Yale Bowl; New Haven, CT	L 14–46	15,000	
October 15	Harvard^{†}	Baker Field; New York, NY	L 7–21	15,000	
October 22	at Army	Michie Stadium; West Point, NY	L 0–45	22,500	
October 29	at Cornell	Schoellkopf Field; Ithaca, NY (rivalry)	L 19–34	14,000	
November 5	Dartmouth	Baker Field; New York, NY	L 7–14	10,000	
November 12	No. 13 Navy	Baker Field; New York, NY	L 0–47	28,000	
November 19	Rutgers	Baker Field; New York, NY	L 6–12	3,000	
^{†}Homecoming; Rankings from AP Poll released prior to the game
