= 1955 Trinity Bantams football team =

American college football season

1955 Trinity Bantams football
- Conference: Independent
- Record: 7–0
- Head coach: Dan Jessee (21st season)
- Home stadium: Trinity Field

1955 Eastern college football independents records
	Conf.			Overall
Team	W	L	T	W		L		T
Alfred		–		8	–	0	–	0
Drexel		–		8	–	0	–	0
Trinity (CT)		–		7	–	0	–	0
Juniata		–		8	–	0	–	1
Carnegie Tech		–		5	–	1	–	1
Tufts		–		5	–	2	–	0
Boston College		–		5	–	2	–	1
No. 20 Army		–		6	–	3	–	0
Colgate		–		6	–	3	–	0
No. 11 Pittsburgh		–		7	–	4	–	0
Holy Cross		–		6	–	4	–	0
Syracuse		–		5	–	3	–	0
Penn State		–		5	–	4	–	0
Buffalo		–		4	–	4	–	1
Hofstra		–		3	–	6	–	0
Bucknell		–		2	–	6	–	1
Boston University		–		2	–	6	–	0
Franklin & Marshall		–		2	–	6	–	0
Villanova		–		1	–	9	–	0
Temple		–		0	–	8	–	0
Rankings from AP Poll

The 1955 Trinity Bantams football team was an American football team that represented Trinity College of Hartford, Connecticut, as an independent during the 1955 college football season. In their 21st season under head coach Dan Jessee, the Bantams compiled a perfect 7–0 record and outscored opponents by a total of 233 to 54.

The season was part of a 15-game winning streak that began with the last game of the 1953 season and included back-to-back perfect seasons in 1954 and 1955. It was also one of several perfect seasons for the Trinity football program, including 1934, 1949, 1954, 1993, 2003, 2004, 2005, 2008, 2012, 2016, and 2022.

Four Trinity players were selected by head coaches and sports writers as first-team players on the 1955 Connecticut Small College Football team. The honorees were: fullback Charlie Sticka; quarterback Bob Alexander; end Sam Niness; and tackle Gerry Channell.

The team played its home games at Trinity Field in Hartford.

== Schedule ==
Date	Opponent	Site	Result	Attendance	Source
September 24	at Williams	Weston Field; Williamstown, MA	W 28–0	2,500	
October 1	at Bowdoin	Whittier Field; Brunswick, ME	W 35–14	3,200	
October 8	Tufts	Trinity Field; Hartford, CT	W 26–20	3,000	
October 15	St. Lawrence	Trinity Field; Hartford, CT	W 33–0		
October 29	at Coast Guard	New London, CT	W 27–0	3,500	
November 5	at Amherst	Pratt Field; Amherst, MA	W 38–14		
November 12	Wesleyan	Trinity Field; Hartford, CT (rivalry)	W 46–6	8,000	

== NFL draft ==
Two Bantams were selected in the 1956 NFL draft following the season.

Round	Pick	Player	Position	NFL team
10	120	Charlie Sticka	FB	Los Angeles Rams
28	335	Bob Alexander	QB	Chicago Bears
