= 1955 Yale Bulldogs football team =

American college football season

1955 Yale Bulldogs football
- Conference: Ivy League
- Record: 7–2 (5–1 Ivy)
- Head coach: Jordan Olivar (4th season)
- Captain: Philip Tarasovic
- Home stadium: Yale Bowl

1955 Ivy League football standings
| | Conf. | | | | | Overall |
| Team | W | | L | | T | W | | L | | T |
|---|---|---|---|---|---|---|---|---|---|---|
| Princeton | 6 | – | 1 | – | 0 | 7 | – | 2 | – | 0 |
| Yale | 5 | – | 1 | – | 0 | 7 | – | 2 | – | 0 |
| Dartmouth | 3 | – | 3 | – | 0 | 3 | – | 6 | – | 0 |
| Cornell | 4 | – | 3 | – | 0 | 5 | – | 4 | – | 0 |
| Harvard | 2 | – | 4 | – | 0 | 3 | – | 4 | – | 1 |
| Brown | 2 | – | 4 | – | 0 | 2 | – | 6 | – | 0 |
| Columbia | 1 | – | 5 | – | 0 | 1 | – | 8 | – | 0 |
| Penn | 0 | – | 1 | – | 0 | 0 | – | 8 | – | 0 |
The Ivy League did not crown an official champion until 1956 when full league play began.

The 1955 Yale Bulldogs football team represented Yale University in the 1955 college football season. The Bulldogs were led by fourth-year head coach Jordan Olivar, played their home games at the Yale Bowl and finished the season with a 7–2 record.

This would be Yale's final year as a football independent, as the Ivy League, which Yale had helped co-found in 1954, began football competition in 1956. Six of the nine opponents on the Bulldogs' 1955 schedule were Ivy League members (with Penn the only Ivy not scheduled); for decades, (future) Ivy members had comprised a large portion of Yale's opponents.

== Schedule ==
| Date | Opponent | Rank | Site | Result | Attendance | Source |
|---|---|---|---|---|---|---|
| September 24 | Connecticut | | Yale Bowl; New Haven, CT | W 14–0 | 5,000 | |
| October 1 | Brown | | Yale Bowl; New Haven, CT | W 27–20 | 22,000 | |
| October 8 | Columbia | | Yale Bowl; New Haven, CT | W 46–14 | 15,000 | |
| October 15 | Cornell | | Yale Bowl; New Haven, CT | W 34–6 | 15,000 | |
| October 22 | Colgate | No. 19 | Yale Bowl; New Haven, CT | L 0–7 | 23,000 | |
| October 29 | Dartmouth | | Yale Bowl; New Haven, CT | W 20–0 | 32,000 | |
| November 5 | No. 19 Army | | Yale Bowl; New Haven, CT | W 14–12 | 61,000 | |
| November 12 | at Princeton | | Palmer Stadium; Princeton, NJ (rivalry) | L 0–13 | 46,000 | |
| November 19 | Harvard | | Yale Bowl; New Haven, CT (The Game) | W 21–7 | 56,000 | |
Rankings from AP Poll released prior to the game

== NFL draft ==
The following Bulldog was selected in the National Football League draft following the season.

| Round | Pick | Player | Position | NFL team |
|---|---|---|---|---|
| 12 | 135 | Phil Tarasovic | E | Pittsburgh Steelers |
