= 1955 Boston University Terriers football team =

American college football season

1955 Boston University Terriers football
- Conference: Independent
- Record: 2–6
- Head coach: Aldo Donelli (9th season)
- Home stadium: Boston University Field

1955 Eastern college football independents records
	Conf.			Overall
Team	W	L	T	W		L		T
Alfred		–		8	–	0	–	0
Drexel		–		8	–	0	–	0
Trinity (CT)		–		7	–	0	–	0
Juniata		–		8	–	0	–	1
Carnegie Tech		–		5	–	1	–	1
Tufts		–		5	–	2	–	0
Boston College		–		5	–	2	–	1
No. 20 Army		–		6	–	3	–	0
Colgate		–		6	–	3	–	0
No. 11 Pittsburgh		–		7	–	4	–	0
Holy Cross		–		6	–	4	–	0
Syracuse		–		5	–	3	–	0
Penn State		–		5	–	4	–	0
Buffalo		–		4	–	4	–	1
Hofstra		–		3	–	6	–	0
Bucknell		–		2	–	6	–	1
Boston University		–		2	–	6	–	0
Franklin & Marshall		–		2	–	6	–	0
Villanova		–		1	–	9	–	0
Temple		–		0	–	8	–	0
Rankings from AP Poll

The 1955 Boston University Terriers football team was an American football team that represented Boston University as an independent during the 1955 college football season. In its ninth season under head coach Aldo Donelli, the team compiled a 2–6 record and was outscored by a total of 174 to 113.

== Schedule ==
Date	Opponent	Site	Result	Attendance	Source
September 24	at Penn State	New Beaver Field; University Park, PA	L 0–35	20,150	
October 1	Connecticut	Boston University Field; Boston, MA	L 7–10		
October 8	at Syracuse	Archbold Stadium; Syracuse, NY	L 12–27	15,000	
October 15	Drake	Boston University Field; Boston, MA	W 32–2	3,000	
October 22	at Holy Cross	Fitton Field; Worcester, MA	L 12–20	17,000	
November 5	NC State	Boston University Field; Boston, MA	L 13–40		
November 12	Boston College	Boston University Field; Boston, MA (rivalry)	L 12–40	25,830	
November 19	Temple	Boston University Field; Boston, MA	W 25–0	8,000	
