= 1955 Colgate Red Raiders football team =

American college football season

1955 Colgate Red Raiders football
- Conference: Independent
- Record: 6–3
- Head coach: Hal Lahar (4th season)
- Captain: Francis Angeline
- Home stadium: Colgate Athletic Field

1955 Eastern college football independents records
	Conf.			Overall
Team	W	L	T	W		L		T
Alfred		–		8	–	0	–	0
Drexel		–		8	–	0	–	0
Trinity (CT)		–		7	–	0	–	0
Juniata		–		8	–	0	–	1
Carnegie Tech		–		5	–	1	–	1
Tufts		–		5	–	2	–	0
Boston College		–		5	–	2	–	1
No. 20 Army		–		6	–	3	–	0
Colgate		–		6	–	3	–	0
No. 11 Pittsburgh		–		7	–	4	–	0
Holy Cross		–		6	–	4	–	0
Syracuse		–		5	–	3	–	0
Penn State		–		5	–	4	–	0
Buffalo		–		4	–	4	–	1
Hofstra		–		3	–	6	–	0
Bucknell		–		2	–	6	–	1
Boston University		–		2	–	6	–	0
Franklin & Marshall		–		2	–	6	–	0
Villanova		–		1	–	9	–	0
Temple		–		0	–	8	–	0
Rankings from AP Poll

The 1955 Colgate Red Raiders football team was an American football team that represented Colgate University as an independent during the 1955 college football season. In its fourth season under head coach Hal Lahar, the team compiled a 6–3 record and outscored opponents by a total of 164 to 107. Francis Angeline was the team captain. The team played its home games at Colgate Athletic Field in Hamilton, New York.

== Schedule ==
Date	Opponent	Site	Result	Attendance	Source
September 24	Dartmouth^{†}	Colgate Athletic Field; Hamilton, NY	W 21–20	8,000	
October 1	at Cornell	Schoellkopf Field; Ithaca, NY (rivalry)	W 21–6	17,000	
October 8	Holy Cross	Colgate Athletic Field; Hamilton, NY	L 14–15	6,000	
October 15	at Princeton	Palmer Stadium; Princeton, NJ	W 15–6	7,000	
October 22	at No. 19 Yale	Yale Bowl; New Haven, CT	W 7–0	23,000	
October 29	at Army	Michie Stadium; West Point, NY	L 7–27	24,700–25,000	
November 5	Bucknell	Memorial Stadium; Lewisburg, PA	W 35–7	6,800	
November 12	at Syracuse	Archbold Stadium; Syracuse, NY (rivalry)	L 19–26	39,500	
November 24	at Brown	Brown Stadium; Providence, RI	W 25–0		
^{†}Homecoming; Rankings from AP Poll released prior to the game
