= 1955 Penn State Nittany Lions football team =

American college football season

1955 Penn State Nittany Lions football
- Conference: Independent
- Record: 5–4
- Head coach: Rip Engle (6th season)
- Captains: Otto Kneidinger; Frank Reich
- Home stadium: New Beaver Field

1955 Eastern college football independents records
	Conf.			Overall
Team	W	L	T	W		L		T
Alfred		–		8	–	0	–	0
Drexel		–		8	–	0	–	0
Trinity (CT)		–		7	–	0	–	0
Juniata		–		8	–	0	–	1
Carnegie Tech		–		5	–	1	–	1
Tufts		–		5	–	2	–	0
Boston College		–		5	–	2	–	1
No. 20 Army		–		6	–	3	–	0
Colgate		–		6	–	3	–	0
No. 11 Pittsburgh		–		7	–	4	–	0
Holy Cross		–		6	–	4	–	0
Syracuse		–		5	–	3	–	0
Penn State		–		5	–	4	–	0
Buffalo		–		4	–	4	–	1
Hofstra		–		3	–	6	–	0
Bucknell		–		2	–	6	–	1
Boston University		–		2	–	6	–	0
Franklin & Marshall		–		2	–	6	–	0
Villanova		–		1	–	9	–	0
Temple		–		0	–	8	–	0
Rankings from AP Poll

The 1955 Penn State Nittany Lions football team represented the Pennsylvania State University as an independent during the 1955 college football season. The team was coached by Rip Engle and played its home games in New Beaver Field in University Park, Pennsylvania.

== Schedule ==
Date	Time	Opponent	Rank	Site	Result	Attendance	Source
September 24		Boston University		New Beaver Field; University Park, PA	W 35–0	20,150	
October 1		at No. 6 Army	No. 18	Michie Stadium; West Point, NY	L 6–35	24,200	
October 8	2:30 p.m.	vs. Virginia		City Stadium; Richmond, VA (Tobacco Bowl)	W 26–7	20,000	
October 15		No. 8 Navy^{†}		New Beaver Field; University Park, PA	L 14–34	32,209–33,112	
October 22		at No. 8 West Virginia		Mountaineer Field; Morgantown, WA (rivalry)	L 7–21	34,400	
October 29		at Penn		Franklin Field; Philadelphia, PA	W 20–0	28,206	
November 5		No. 18 Syracuse		New Beaver Field; University Park, PA (rivalry)	W 21–20	30,321	
November 12		at Rutgers		Rutgers Stadium; Piscataway, NJ	W 34–13	12,000	
November 19		No. 15 Pittsburgh		New Beaver Field; University Park, PA (rivalry)	L 0–20	28,361–31,200	
^{†}Homecoming; Rankings from AP Poll released prior to the game; All times are in Eastern time
