= 1955 Army Cadets football team =

American college football season

1955 Army Cadets football
- Conference: Independent

Ranking
- Coaches: No. 15
- AP: No. 20
- Record: 6–3
- Head coach: Earl Blaik (15th season)
- Captain: Pat Uebel
- Home stadium: Michie Stadium

1955 Eastern college football independents records
	Conf.			Overall
Team	W	L	T	W		L		T
Alfred		–		8	–	0	–	0
Drexel		–		8	–	0	–	0
Trinity (CT)		–		7	–	0	–	0
Juniata		–		8	–	0	–	1
Carnegie Tech		–		5	–	1	–	1
Tufts		–		5	–	2	–	0
Boston College		–		5	–	2	–	1
No. 20 Army		–		6	–	3	–	0
Colgate		–		6	–	3	–	0
No. 11 Pittsburgh		–		7	–	4	–	0
Holy Cross		–		6	–	4	–	0
Syracuse		–		5	–	3	–	0
Penn State		–		5	–	4	–	0
Buffalo		–		4	–	4	–	1
Hofstra		–		3	–	6	–	0
Bucknell		–		2	–	6	–	1
Boston University		–		2	–	6	–	0
Franklin & Marshall		–		2	–	6	–	0
Villanova		–		1	–	9	–	0
Temple		–		0	–	8	–	0
Rankings from AP Poll

The 1955 Army Cadets football team represented the United States Military Academy as an independent during the 1955 college football season. In their 15th year under head coach Earl Blaik, the Cadets compiled a 6–3 record and outscored all opponents by a combined total of 256 to 72. In the annual Army–Navy Game, the Cadets defeated the Midshipmen by a 14 to 6 score. The Cadets also lost to Michigan, Syracuse, and Yale.

No Army players were honored on the 1955 College Football All-America Team.

== Schedule ==
Date	Time	Opponent	Rank	Site	TV	Result	Attendance	Source
September 24		Furman	No. 14	Michie Stadium; West Point, NY		W 81–0	17,000	
October 1		No. 18 Penn State	No. 6	Michie Stadium; West Point, NY		W 35–6	24,200	
October 8		at No. 2 Michigan	No. 6	Michigan Stadium; Ann Arbor, MI		L 2–26	97,239–97,366	
October 15		Syracuse	No. 18	Michie Stadium; West Point, NY		L 0–13	12,500	
October 22		Columbia		Michie Stadium; West Point, NY		W 45–0	22,500	
October 29		Colgate		Michie Stadium; West Point, NY		W 27–7	24,700–25,000	
November 5		at Yale	No. 19	Yale Bowl; New Haven, CT		L 12–14	61,000	
November 12		at Penn		Franklin Field; Philadelphia, PA		W 40–0	27,170	
November 26	1:15 p.m.	vs. No. 11 Navy		Philadelphia Municipal Stadium; Philadelphia, PA (Army–Navy Game)	NBC	W 14–6	102,000	
Rankings from AP Poll released prior to the game; All times are in Eastern time

== Game summaries ==
=== Navy ===
	1	2	3	4	Total
Navy	6	0	0	0	6
Army	0	0	7	7	14

== Roster ==
1955 Army Cadets football team roster
Players
Coaches
Offense

Pos.	#	Name	Class
G		Ralph Chesnauskas	Sr
QB		Don Holleder	Sr
		Peter Lash
FB		Pat Uebel	Sr

Defense

Pos.	#	Name	Class

Special teams

Pos.	#	Name	Class

Head coach

- Earl Blaik

Coordinators/assistant coaches

Legend

- (C) Team captain
- (S) Suspended
- (I) Ineligible
- Injured
- Redshirt
