= 1955 Boston College Eagles football team =

American college football season

1955 Boston College Eagles football
- Conference: Independent
- Record: 5–2–1
- Head coach: Mike Holovak (5th season)
- Captain: John Miller
- Home stadium: Alumni Field, Fenway Park

1955 Eastern college football independents records
	Conf.			Overall
Team	W	L	T	W		L		T
Alfred		–		8	–	0	–	0
Drexel		–		8	–	0	–	0
Trinity (CT)		–		7	–	0	–	0
Juniata		–		8	–	0	–	1
Carnegie Tech		–		5	–	1	–	1
Tufts		–		5	–	2	–	0
Boston College		–		5	–	2	–	1
No. 20 Army		–		6	–	3	–	0
Colgate		–		6	–	3	–	0
No. 11 Pittsburgh		–		7	–	4	–	0
Holy Cross		–		6	–	4	–	0
Syracuse		–		5	–	3	–	0
Penn State		–		5	–	4	–	0
Buffalo		–		4	–	4	–	1
Hofstra		–		3	–	6	–	0
Bucknell		–		2	–	6	–	1
Boston University		–		2	–	6	–	0
Franklin & Marshall		–		2	–	6	–	0
Villanova		–		1	–	9	–	0
Temple		–		0	–	8	–	0
Rankings from AP Poll

The 1955 Boston College Eagles football team represented Boston College as an independent in the 1955 college football season. Led by fifth-year head coach Mike Holovak, the Eagles compiled a record of 5–2–1. Boston College played home games at Alumni Field in Chestnut Hill, Massachusetts and Fenway Park in Boston. Team captain John Miller went on to play four seasons in the National Football League (NFL).

The team won its first three games and was ranked No. 17 in the AP Poll after those three victories. The team suffered its first loss to Xavier, and one week later lost a close game to the Miami Hurricanes by a 14–7 score.

In the annual Green Line Rivalry game, Boston College gained 420 yards and defeated Boston University, 40–12, before a crowd of 25,827.

The final game of the season was a 26–7 victory over rival Holy Cross in front of 37,235 fans at Fenway Park.

== Schedule ==
Date	Opponent	Rank	Site	Result	Attendance	Source
September 24	Brandeis		Alumni Field; Chestnut Hill, MA	W 27–0	8,000	
October 8	Villanova		Fenway Park; Boston, MA	W 28–14	10,102	
October 15	Detroit		Fenway Park; Boston, MA	W 23–0	6,458	
October 21	Marquette	No. 17	Fenway Park; Boston, MA	T 13–13	18,224–18,324	
October 29	at Xavier		Corcoran Stadium; Cincinnati, OH	L 12–19	24,000	
November 4	at Miami (FL)		Burdine Stadium; Miami, FL	L 7–14	42,249	
November 12	at Boston University		Boston University Field; Boston, MA (rivalry)	W 40–12	25,830	
November 26	vs. Holy Cross		Fenway Park; Boston, MA (rivalry)	W 26–7	37,235	
Rankings from AP Poll released prior to the game
