= 1955 Vermont Catamounts football team =

American college football season

1955 Vermont Catamounts football
- Conference: Yankee Conference
- Record: 3–3–1 (0–3 Yankee)
- Head coach: J. Edward Donnelly (4th season)
- Home stadium: Centennial Field

1955 Yankee Conference football standings
| | Conf. | | | | | Overall |
| Team | W | | L | | T | W | | L | | T |
|---|---|---|---|---|---|---|---|---|---|---|
| Rhode Island $ | 4 | – | 0 | – | 1 | 6 | – | 1 | – | 2 |
| Maine | 2 | – | 1 | – | 1 | 5 | – | 1 | – | 1 |
| Connecticut | 2 | – | 2 | – | 0 | 4 | – | 4 | – | 0 |
| New Hampshire | 1 | – | 1 | – | 2 | 2 | – | 4 | – | 2 |
| UMass | 1 | – | 3 | – | 0 | 4 | – | 4 | – | 0 |
| Vermont | 0 | – | 3 | – | 0 | 3 | – | 3 | – | 1 |
$ – Conference champion

The 1955 Vermont Catamounts football team was an American football team that represented the University of Vermont in the Yankee Conference during the 1955 college football season. In their fourth year under head coach J. Edward Donnelly, the team compiled a 3–3–1 record.

== Schedule ==
| Date | Opponent | Site | Result | Attendance | Source |
|---|---|---|---|---|---|
| September 24 | Union (NY)* | Centennial Field; Burlington, VT | W 33–6 | | |
| October 1 | at Maine | Alumni Field; Orono, ME | L 0–34 | | |
| October 8 | Rhode Island | Centennial Field; Burlington, VT | L 0–16 | | |
| October 15 | Rochester* | Centennial Field; Burlington, VT | W 21–12 | | |
| October 22 | Norwich* | Centennial Field; Burlington, VT | T 20–20 | 7,000 | |
| October 29 | at UMass | Alumni Field; Amherst, MA | L 15–54 | | |
| November 5 | at Middlebury* | Porter Field; Middlebury, VT | W 6–0 | | |
*Non-conference game
