= Royce Flippin =

American football player and administrator (1934–2021)

Biographical details
- Born: May 4, 1934; Montclair, New Jersey, U.S.
- Died: July 31, 2021 (aged 87); New Brunswick, New Jersey, U.S.

Playing career
- 1953–1955: Princeton
- Position: Halfback

Administrative career (AD unless noted)
- 1972–1979: Princeton
- 1980–1992: MIT

Accomplishments and honors

Awards
- First-team All-Eastern (1954); Second-team All-Eastern (1953)

Royce N. Flippin, Jr. (May 4, 1934 – July 31, 2021) was an American college football player and athletics administrator. He served as the athletic director at Princeton University from 1972 to 1979 and at the Massachusetts Institute of Technology (MIT) from 1980 to 1992. A 1956 graduate of Princeton, he played football for the Princeton Tigers as a halfback from 1953 to 1955, captaining the 1955 squad.

Flippin was born and raised in Montclair, New Jersey. He died on July 31, 2021, at his home in New Brunswick, New Jersey.
