= 1955 Bucknell Bison football team =

American college football season

1955 Bucknell Bison football
- Conference: Independent
- Record: 2–6–1
- Head coach: Harry Lawrence (9th season)
- Captains: Jim Kozlowski; Bob Sierer
- Home stadium: Memorial Stadium

1955 Eastern college football independents records
	Conf.			Overall
Team	W	L	T	W		L		T
Alfred		–		8	–	0	–	0
Drexel		–		8	–	0	–	0
Trinity (CT)		–		7	–	0	–	0
Juniata		–		8	–	0	–	1
Carnegie Tech		–		5	–	1	–	1
Tufts		–		5	–	2	–	0
Boston College		–		5	–	2	–	1
No. 20 Army		–		6	–	3	–	0
Colgate		–		6	–	3	–	0
No. 11 Pittsburgh		–		7	–	4	–	0
Holy Cross		–		6	–	4	–	0
Syracuse		–		5	–	3	–	0
Penn State		–		5	–	4	–	0
Buffalo		–		4	–	4	–	1
Hofstra		–		3	–	6	–	0
Bucknell		–		2	–	6	–	1
Boston University		–		2	–	6	–	0
Franklin & Marshall		–		2	–	6	–	0
Villanova		–		1	–	9	–	0
Temple		–		0	–	8	–	0
Rankings from AP Poll

The 1955 Bucknell Bison football team was an American football team that represented Bucknell University as an independent during the 1955 college football season.

In its ninth season under head coach Harry Lawrence, the team compiled a 2–6–1 record. Bob Sierer and Jim Kozlowski were the team captains.

The team played its home games at Memorial Stadium on the university campus in Lewisburg, Pennsylvania.

== Schedule ==
Date	Opponent	Site	Result	Attendance	Source
September 24	Albright	Memorial Stadium; Lewisburg, PA	W 25–14	3,000	
October 1	vs. Gettysburg	Hershey Stadium; Hershey, PA (Rotary Bowl)	L 6–27	7,000	
October 8	at Lehigh	Taylor Stadium; Bethlehem, PA	L 20–27	6,500	
October 15	Temple	Memorial Stadium; Lewisburg, PA	W 38–0	6,200	
October 22	at Lafayette	Fisher Field; Easton, PA	L 13–34	9,000	
October 29	at Harvard	Harvard Stadium; Boston, MA	T 26–26	9,000	
November 5	Colgate^{†}	Memorial Stadium; Lewisburg, PA	L 7–35	6,800	
November 11	at Miami (FL)	Burdine Stadium; Miami, FL	L 0–46	30,240	
November 19	Delaware	Memorial Stadium; Lewisburg, PA	L 12–27	2,175	
^{†}Homecoming
