= 1955 Villanova Wildcats football team =

American college football season

1955 Villanova Wildcats football
- Conference: Independent
- Record: 1–9
- Head coach: Frank Reagan (2nd season)
- Captain: Donald McComb
- Home stadium: Philadelphia Municipal Stadium, Villanova Stadium

1955 Eastern college football independents records
	Conf.			Overall
Team	W	L	T	W		L		T
Alfred		–		8	–	0	–	0
Drexel		–		8	–	0	–	0
Trinity (CT)		–		7	–	0	–	0
Juniata		–		8	–	0	–	1
Carnegie Tech		–		5	–	1	–	1
Tufts		–		5	–	2	–	0
Boston College		–		5	–	2	–	1
No. 20 Army		–		6	–	3	–	0
Colgate		–		6	–	3	–	0
No. 11 Pittsburgh		–		7	–	4	–	0
Holy Cross		–		6	–	4	–	0
Syracuse		–		5	–	3	–	0
Penn State		–		5	–	4	–	0
Buffalo		–		4	–	4	–	1
Hofstra		–		3	–	6	–	0
Bucknell		–		2	–	6	–	1
Boston University		–		2	–	6	–	0
Franklin & Marshall		–		2	–	6	–	0
Villanova		–		1	–	9	–	0
Temple		–		0	–	8	–	0
Rankings from AP Poll

The 1955 Villanova Wildcats football team represented the Villanova University during the 1955 college football season. The head coach was Frank Reagan, coaching his second season with the Wildcats. The team played their home games at Villanova Stadium in Villanova, Pennsylvania.

== Schedule ==
Date	Opponent	Site	Result	Attendance	Source
September 24	No. 18 Baylor	Philadelphia Municipal Stadium; Philadelphia, PA	L 2–19	63,409	
October 1	at Kentucky	Stoll Field; Lexington, KY	L 0–28	24,000	
October 8	at Boston College	Fenway Park; Boston, MA	L 14–28	10,102	
October 15	at Indiana	Memorial Stadium; Bloomington, IN	L 7–14	24,242–25,000	
October 22	NC State	Villanova Stadium; Villanova, PA	L 13–34	8,783	
October 29	Richmond	Villanova Stadium; Villanova, PA	W 16–14	7,935	
November 5	at Florida State	Doak Campbell Stadium; Tallahassee, FL	L 13–16	9,700	
November 12	at Detroit	University of Detroit Stadium; Detroit, MI	L 0–6	14,350	
November 19	at Houston	Rice Stadium; Houston, TX	L 14–26	12,000	
November 27	at Dayton	UD Stadium; Dayton, OH	L 7–19	6,450	
Rankings from AP Poll released prior to the game
