= 1955 Maine Black Bears football team =

American college football season

1955 Maine Black Bears football

MIAA champion
- Conference: Yankee Conference, Maine Intercollegiate Athletic Association
- Record: 5–1–1 (2–1–1 Yankee, 3–0 MIAA)
- Head coach: Harold Westerman (5th season)
- Captains: James Duffy; John Small
- Home stadium: Alumni Field

1955 Yankee Conference football standings
	Conf.					Overall
Team	W		L		T	W		L		T
Rhode Island $	4	–	0	–	1	6	–	1	–	2
Maine	2	–	1	–	1	5	–	1	–	1
Connecticut	2	–	2	–	0	4	–	4	–	0
New Hampshire	1	–	1	–	2	2	–	4	–	2
UMass	1	–	3	–	0	4	–	4	–	0
Vermont	0	–	3	–	0	3	–	3	–	1
$ – Conference champion

The 1955 Maine Black Bears football team was an American football team that represented the University of Maine as a member of the Yankee Conference and Maine Intercollegiate Athletic Association during the 1955 college football season. In its fifth season under head coach Harold Westerman, the team compiled a 5–1–1 record (2–1–1 against Yankee Conference and 3–0 against MIAA opponents), finished third out of the six teams in the Yankee Conference, and won the Maine "State Series" championship. The team played its home games at Alumni Field in Orono, Maine. James Duffy and John Small were the team captains.

The team's statistical leaders included halfback Ray Hostetter with 291 rushing yards; quarterback James Duffy with 237 passing yards; and end Paul Boucher with 104 receiving yards. Three players (Hostetter, Duffy, and halfback Warren Griffin) tied with 24 points scored.

== Schedule ==
Date	Opponent	Site	Result	Attendance	Source
September 24	at Rhode Island	Meade Stadium; Kingston, RI	L 0–7		
October 1	Vermont	Alumni Field; Orono, ME	W 34–0		
October 8	at New Hampshire	Cowell Stadium; Durham, NH (rivalry)	T 6–6	7,500	
October 15	Connecticut	Alumni Field; Orono, ME	W 13–0	6,500	
October 22	at Bates	Garcelon Field; Lewiston, ME	W 15–13		
October 29	at Colby^{†}	Seaverns Field; Waterville, ME	W 53–0	4,500	
November 5	Bowdoin*	Alumni Field; Orono, ME	W 54–8	7,600	
*Non-conference game; ^{†}Homecoming

== After the season ==
The following Black Bear was selected in the 1956 NFL draft after the season.

Round	Pick	Player	Position	NFL club
16	193	Thurlow Cooper	End	Cleveland Browns
