= 1955 Connecticut Huskies football team =

American college football season

1955 Connecticut Huskies football
- Conference: Yankee Conference
- Record: 4–4 (2–2 Yankee)
- Head coach: Bob Ingalls (4th season)
- Home stadium: Memorial Stadium

1955 Yankee Conference football standings
	Conf.					Overall
Team	W		L		T	W		L		T
Rhode Island $	4	–	0	–	1	6	–	1	–	2
Maine	2	–	1	–	1	5	–	1	–	1
Connecticut	2	–	2	–	0	4	–	4	–	0
New Hampshire	1	–	1	–	2	2	–	4	–	2
UMass	1	–	3	–	0	4	–	4	–	0
Vermont	0	–	3	–	0	3	–	3	–	1
$ – Conference champion

The 1955 Connecticut Huskies football team represented the University of Connecticut in the 1955 college football season. The Huskies were led by fourth-year head coach Bob Ingalls, and completed the season with a record of 4–4.

== Schedule ==
Date	Opponent	Site	Result	Attendance	Source
September 24	at Yale*	Yale Bowl; New Haven, CT	L 0–14	5,000	
October 1	at Boston University*	Boston University Field; Boston, MA	W 10–7		
October 8	UMass	Memorial Stadium; Storrs, CT (rivalry)	W 18–13		
October 15	at Maine	Orono, ME	L 0–13	6,500	
October 22	at Delaware*	Delaware Stadium; Newark, DE	L 14–26	7,200	
October 29	New Hampshire	Memorial Stadium; Storrs, CT	W 20–7		
November 12	Rhode Island	Memorial Stadium; Storrs, CT (rivalry)	L 0–25		
November 19	Holy Cross*	Memorial Stadium; Storrs, CT	W 6–0	5,000	
*Non-conference game
