= 1955 Penn Quakers football team =

American college football season

1955 Penn Quakers football
- Conference: Ivy League
- Record: 0–9 (0–1 Ivy)
- Head coach: Steve Sebo (2nd season)
- Home stadium: Franklin Field

1955 Ivy League football standings
	Conf.					Overall
Team	W		L		T	W		L		T
Princeton	6	–	1	–	0	7	–	2	–	0
Yale	5	–	1	–	0	7	–	2	–	0
Dartmouth	3	–	3	–	0	3	–	6	–	0
Cornell	4	–	3	–	0	5	–	4	–	0
Harvard	2	–	4	–	0	3	–	4	–	1
Brown	2	–	4	–	0	2	–	6	–	0
Columbia	1	–	5	–	0	1	–	8	–	0
Penn	0	–	1	–	0	0	–	8	–	0
The Ivy League did not crown an official champion until 1956 when full league play began.

The 1955 Penn Quakers football team was an American football team that represented the University of Pennsylvania during the 1955 college football season. Led by Steve Sebo in his second year as head coach, the Quakers finished the season with a 0–9 record, matching their 1954 campaign. Penn was outscored 270 to 34 on the season, shut out five times, and scored more than seven points only once, in a 46–14 loss to No. 6 Notre Dame. By the end of the season, Penn had lost 18 consecutive games and had not won in 22 straight contests, dating back to a loss to Michigan on Halloween 1953.

== Schedule ==
Date	Opponent	Site	Result	Attendance	Source
September 24	VPI	Franklin Field; Philadelphia, PA	L 0–33	12,751	
October 1	California	California Memorial Stadium; Berkeley, CA	L 7–27	21,000	
October 8	Princeton	Franklin Field; Philadelphia, PA (rivalry)	L 0–7	24,325	
October 15	George Washington	Franklin Field; Philadelphia, PA	L 6–25	13,178	
October 22	No. 4 Navy	Franklin Field; Philadelphia, PA	L 0–33	34,543	
October 29	Penn State	Franklin Field; Philadelphia, PA	L 0–20	28,206	
November 5	No. 6 Notre Dame	Franklin Field; Philadelphia, PA	L 14–46	45,226	
November 12	Army	Franklin Field; Philadelphia, PA	L 0–40	27,170	
November 24	Cornell	Franklin Field; Philadelphia, PA (rivalry)	L 7–39	25,668	
Rankings from AP Poll released prior to the game
