= 1955 Rhode Island Rams football team =

American college football season

1955 Rhode Island Rams football

Yankee champion

Refrigerator Bowl, L 10–12 vs. Jacksonville State
- Conference: Yankee Conference
- Record: 6–1–2 (4–0–1 Yankee)
- Head coach: Hal Kopp (5th season)
- Home stadium: Meade Stadium

1955 Yankee Conference football standings
	Conf.					Overall
Team	W		L		T	W		L		T
Rhode Island $	4	–	0	–	1	6	–	1	–	2
Maine	2	–	1	–	1	5	–	1	–	1
Connecticut	2	–	2	–	0	4	–	4	–	0
New Hampshire	1	–	1	–	2	2	–	4	–	2
UMass	1	–	3	–	0	4	–	4	–	0
Vermont	0	–	3	–	0	3	–	3	–	1
$ – Conference champion

The 1955 Rhode Island Rams football team was an American football team that represented the University of Rhode Island as a member of the Yankee Conference during the 1955 college football season. In its fifth season under head coach Hal Kopp, the team compiled a 6–1–2 record (4–0–1 against conference opponents), won the Yankee Conference championship, lost to Jacksonville State in the Refrigerator Bowl, and outscored all opponents by a total of 162 to 67.

The team tallied 1,953 rushing yards and 386 passing yards. On defense, they held opponents to 710 rushing yards and 513 passing yards. The team's individual leaders included:

- Halfback Ed DiSimone led the team in rushing (676 yards on 131 carries), total offense (791 yards), scoring (48 points on eight touchdowns), and punting (13 punts, 29-yard average). He also passed for 115 yards.
- Quarterback Jim Adams completed 13 of 31 passes for 181 yards, one touchdown, and three interceptions.
- End Dick Gourley caught eight passes for 150 yards.

The team played its home games at Meade Stadium in Kingston, Rhode Island.

== Schedule ==
Date	Opponent	Site	Result	Attendance	Source
September 17	at Northeastern*	Kent Street Field; Brookline, MA	T 13–13	4,200	
September 24	Maine	Meade Stadium; Kingston, RI	W 7–0		
October 1	New Hampshire	Meade Stadium; Kingston, RI	T 13–13		
October 8	at Vermont	Centennial Field; Burlington, VT	W 16–0		
October 15	at UMass	Alumni Field; Amherst, MA	W 39–15		
October 22	at Brown*	Brown Stadium; Providence, RI (rivalry)	W 19–7	16,000	
October 29	Springfield*^{†}	Meade Stadium; Kingston, RI	W 20–7	4,500	
November 12	at Connecticut	Memorial Stadium; Storrs, CT (rivalry)	W 25–0		
December 4	vs. Jacksonville State*	Reitz Bowl; Evansville, IN (Refrigerator Bowl)	L 10–12	7,000	
*Non-conference game; ^{†}Homecoming
