= 1955 Cornell Big Red football team =

American college football season

1955 Cornell Big Red football
- Conference: Ivy League
- Record: 5–4 (3–3 Ivy)
- Head coach: George K. James (9th season)
- Captain: Dick Jackson
- Home stadium: Schoellkopf Field

1955 Ivy League football standings
	Conf.					Overall
Team	W		L		T	W		L		T
Princeton	6	–	1	–	0	7	–	2	–	0
Yale	5	–	1	–	0	7	–	2	–	0
Dartmouth	3	–	3	–	0	3	–	6	–	0
Cornell	4	–	3	–	0	5	–	4	–	0
Harvard	2	–	4	–	0	3	–	4	–	1
Brown	2	–	4	–	0	2	–	6	–	0
Columbia	1	–	5	–	0	1	–	8	–	0
Penn	0	–	1	–	0	0	–	8	–	0
The Ivy League did not crown an official champion until 1956 when full league play began.

The 1955 Cornell Big Red football team was an American football team that represented Cornell University as an independent during the 1955 college football season. In its ninth season under head coach George K. James, the team compiled a 5–4 record and outscored its opponents 159 to 134. Dick Jackson was the team captain.

This would be Cornell's final year as a football independent, as the Ivy League, which Cornell had helped co-found in 1954, began football competition in 1956. All seven Ivy League opponents appeared on Cornell's 1955 schedule; the Big Red had been playing most of their games against (future) Ivy teams for decades.

Cornell played its home games at Schoellkopf Field in Ithaca, New York.

== Schedule ==
Date	Opponent	Site	Result	Attendance	Source
September 24	Lehigh	Schoellkopf Field; Ithaca, NY	W 14–6	10,000	
October 1	Colgate	Schoellkopf Field; Ithaca, NY (rivalry)	L 6–21	17,000	
October 8	at Harvard	Harvard Stadium; Boston, MA	W 20–7	13,000	
October 15	at Yale	Yale Bowl; New Haven, CT	L 6–34	15,000	
October 22	Princeton	Schoellkopf Field; Ithaca, NY	L 20–26	25,000	
October 29	Columbia	Schoellkopf Field; Ithaca, NY (rivalry)	W 34–19	14,000	
November 5	at Brown	Brown Stadium; Providence, RI	W 20–7	2,500	
November 12	at Dartmouth	Memorial Field; Hanover, NH (rivalry)	L 0–7	11,500	
November 24	at Penn	Franklin Field; Philadelphia, PA (rivalry)	W 39–7	25,668	
