= 1955 UMass Redmen football team =

American college football season

1955 UMass Redmen football
- Conference: Yankee Conference
- Record: 4–4 (1–3 Yankee)
- Head coach: Charlie O'Rourke (4th season)
- Home stadium: Alumni Field

1955 Yankee Conference football standings
	Conf.					Overall
Team	W		L		T	W		L		T
Rhode Island $	4	–	0	–	1	6	–	1	–	2
Maine	2	–	1	–	1	5	–	1	–	1
Connecticut	2	–	2	–	0	4	–	4	–	0
New Hampshire	1	–	1	–	2	2	–	4	–	2
UMass	1	–	3	–	0	4	–	4	–	0
Vermont	0	–	3	–	0	3	–	3	–	1
$ – Conference champion

The 1955 UMass Redmen football team represented the University of Massachusetts Amherst in the 1955 college football season as a member of the Yankee Conference. The team was coached by Charlie O'Rourke and played its home games at Alumni Field in Amherst, Massachusetts. UMass finished the season with a record of 4–4 overall and 1–3 in conference play.

== Schedule ==
Date	Opponent	Site	Result	Attendance	Source
September 26	American International*	Alumni Field; Amherst, MA	W 27–13		
October 1	Harvard*	Alumni Field; Amherst, MA	L 6–60	12,500	
October 8	at Connecticut	Memorial Stadium; Storrs, CT (rivalry)	L 13–18		
October 15	Rhode Island	Alumni Field; Amherst, MA	L 15–39		
October 22	at Northeastern*	Kent Street Field; Brookline, MA	W 33–13		
October 29	Vermont	Alumni Field; Amherst, MA	W 54–13		
November 5	at Brandeis*	Brandeis Stadium; Waltham, MA	W 17–6		
November 12	at New Hampshire	Cowell Stadium; Durham, NH (rivalry)	L 7–21		
*Non-conference game
