= 1955 Brown Bears football team =

American college football season

1955 Brown Bears football
- Conference: Ivy League
- Record: 2–7 (2–4 Ivy)
- Head coach: Alva Kelley (5th season)
- Captain: J. McGuinness
- Home stadium: Brown Stadium

1955 Ivy League football standings
	Conf.					Overall
Team	W		L		T	W		L		T
Princeton	6	–	1	–	0	7	–	2	–	0
Yale	5	–	1	–	0	7	–	2	–	0
Dartmouth	3	–	3	–	0	3	–	6	–	0
Cornell	4	–	3	–	0	5	–	4	–	0
Harvard	2	–	4	–	0	3	–	4	–	1
Brown	2	–	4	–	0	2	–	6	–	0
Columbia	1	–	5	–	0	1	–	8	–	0
Penn	0	–	1	–	0	0	–	8	–	0
The Ivy League did not crown an official champion until 1956 when full league play began.

The 1955 Brown Bears football team was an American football team that represented Brown University as an independent during the 1955 college football season.

In their fifth season under head coach Alva Kelley, the Bears compiled a 2–7 record, and were outscored 139 to 88. J. McGuinness was the team captain.

This would be Brown's final year as a football independent, as the Ivy League, which Brown had helped co-found in 1954, began football competition in 1956. Six of the nine opponents on Brown's 1955 schedule were Ivy League members (with Penn the only Ivy not scheduled); for decades, (future) Ivy members had comprised about half of Brown's opponents annually.

Brown played its home games at Brown Stadium in Providence, Rhode Island.

== Schedule ==
Date	Opponent	Site	Result	Attendance	Source
September 24	at Columbia	Baker Field; New York, NY	L 12–14	8,000	
October 1	at Yale	Yale Bowl; New Haven, CT	L 20–27	22,000	
October 8	Dartmouth	Brown Stadium; Providence, RI	W 7–0	15,000	
October 15	Rutgers	Brown Stadium; Providence, RI	L 12–14	12,000	
October 22	Rhode Island	Brown Stadium; Providence, RI (rivalry)	L 7–19	16,000	
October 29	at Princeton	Palmer Stadium; Princeton, NJ	L 7–14	22,500	
November 5	Cornell	Brown Stadium; Providence, RI	L 7–20	2,500	
November 12	at Harvard	Harvard Stadium; Boston, MA	W 14–6	16,500	
November 24	Colgate	Brown Stadium; Providence, RI	L 0–25		
