= 1955 Harvard Crimson football team =

American college football season

1955 Harvard Crimson football
- Conference: Ivy League
- Record: 3–4–1 (2–4 Ivy)
- Head coach: Lloyd Jordan (6th season)
- Captain: William M. Meigs
- Home stadium: Harvard Stadium

1955 Ivy League football standings
	Conf.					Overall
Team	W		L		T	W		L		T
Princeton	6	–	1	–	0	7	–	2	–	0
Yale	5	–	1	–	0	7	–	2	–	0
Dartmouth	3	–	3	–	0	3	–	6	–	0
Cornell	4	–	3	–	0	5	–	4	–	0
Harvard	2	–	4	–	0	3	–	4	–	1
Brown	2	–	4	–	0	2	–	6	–	0
Columbia	1	–	5	–	0	1	–	8	–	0
Penn	0	–	1	–	0	0	–	8	–	0
The Ivy League did not crown an official champion until 1956 when full league play began.

The 1955 Harvard Crimson football team was an American football team that represented Harvard University during the 1955 college football season. In their sixth year under head coach Lloyd Jordan, the Crimson compiled a 3–4–1 record but outscored opponents 143 to 114. William M. Meigs was the team captain.

This would be Harvard's final year as a football independent, as the Ivy League, which Harvard had helped co-found in 1954, began football competition in 1956. Six of the eight opponents on the Crimson's 1955 schedule were Ivy League members (with Penn the only Ivy not scheduled); for decades, (future) Ivy members had comprised a large portion of Harvard's opponents.

Harvard played its home games at Harvard Stadium in the Allston neighborhood of Boston, Massachusetts.

== Schedule ==
Date	Opponent	Site	Result	Attendance	Source
October 1	UMass	Harvard Stadium; Boston, MA	W 60–6	12,500	
October 8	Cornell	Harvard Stadium; Boston, MA	L 7–20	13,000	
October 15	at Columbia	Baker Field; New York, NY	W 21–7	15,000	
October 22	at Dartmouth	Memorial Field; Hanover, NH (rivalry)	L 9–14	13,500	
October 29	Bucknell	Harvard Stadium; Boston, MA	T 26–26	9,000	
November 5	Princeton	Harvard Stadium; Boston, MA (rivalry)	W 7–6	21,000	
November 12	Brown	Harvard Stadium; Boston, MA	L 6–14	16,500	
November 19	at Yale	Yale Bowl; New Haven, CT (The Game)	L 7–21	56,000	
