= 1955 New Hampshire Wildcats football team =

American college football season

1955 New Hampshire Wildcats football
- Conference: Yankee Conference
- Record: 2–4–2 (1–1–2 Yankee)
- Head coach: Chief Boston (7th season)
- Home stadium: Cowell Stadium

1955 Yankee Conference football standings
	Conf.					Overall
Team	W		L		T	W		L		T
Rhode Island $	4	–	0	–	1	6	–	1	–	2
Maine	2	–	1	–	1	5	–	1	–	1
Connecticut	2	–	2	–	0	4	–	4	–	0
New Hampshire	1	–	1	–	2	2	–	4	–	2
UMass	1	–	3	–	0	4	–	4	–	0
Vermont	0	–	3	–	0	3	–	3	–	1
$ – Conference champion

The 1955 New Hampshire Wildcats football team was an American football team that represented the University of New Hampshire as a member of the Yankee Conference during the 1955 college football season. In its seventh year under head coach Chief Boston, the team compiled a 2–4–2 record (1–1–2 against conference opponents) and finished fourth out of six teams in the Yankee Conference.

== Schedule ==
Date	Opponent	Site	Result	Attendance	Source
September 24	Bridgeport*	Cowell Stadium; Durham, NH	W 39–0		
October 1	at Rhode Island	Meade Stadium; Kingston, RI	T 13–13		
October 8	Maine	Cowell Stadium; Durham, NH (Battle for the Brice–Cowell Musket)	T 6–6	7,500	
October 15	at Delaware*	Delaware Stadium; Newark, DE	L 18–20	6,500	
October 22	Brandeis*	Cowell Stadium; Durham, NH	L 14–20		
October 29	at Connecticut	Memorial Stadium; Storrs, CT	L 7–20		
November 5	at Springfield*	Springfield, MA	L 0–18		
November 19	UMass	Cowell Stadium; Durham, NH (rivalry)	W 21–7		
*Non-conference game
