= 1955 Princeton Tigers football team =

American college football season

1955 Princeton Tigers football
- Conference: Ivy League
- Record: 7–2 (6–1 Ivy)
- Head coach: Charlie Caldwell (11th season)
- Captain: Royce Flippin
- Home stadium: Palmer Stadium

1955 Ivy League football standings
	Conf.					Overall
Team	W		L		T	W		L		T
Princeton	6	–	1	–	0	7	–	2	–	0
Yale	5	–	1	–	0	7	–	2	–	0
Dartmouth	3	–	3	–	0	3	–	6	–	0
Cornell	4	–	3	–	0	5	–	4	–	0
Harvard	2	–	4	–	0	3	–	4	–	1
Brown	2	–	4	–	0	2	–	6	–	0
Columbia	1	–	5	–	0	1	–	8	–	0
Penn	0	–	1	–	0	0	–	8	–	0
The Ivy League did not crown an official champion until 1956 when full league play began.

The 1955 Princeton Tigers football team was an American football team that represented Princeton University during the 1955 college football season. In their 11th year under head coach Charlie Caldwell, the Tigers compiled a 7–2 record and outscored opponents 139 to 66. Royce Flippin was the team captain.

This would be Princeton's final year as a football independent, as the Ivy League, which Princeton had helped co-found in 1954, began football competition in 1956. All seven Ivy League opponents appeared on Princeton's 1955 schedule; the Tigers had been playing most of their games against (future) Ivy teams for decades.

Princeton played its home games at Palmer Stadium on the university campus in Princeton, New Jersey.

== Schedule ==
Date	Opponent	Site	Result	Attendance	Source
September 24	Rutgers	Palmer Stadium; Princeton, NJ (rivalry)	W 41–7	18,500	
October 1	Columbia	Palmer Stadium; Princeton, NJ	W 20–7	15,500	
October 8	at Penn	Franklin Field; Philadelphia, PA (rivalry)	W 7–0	24,325	
October 15	Colgate	Palmer Stadium; Princeton, NJ	L 6–15	7,000	
October 22	at Cornell	Schoellkopf Field; Ithaca, NY	W 26–20	25,000	
October 29	Brown	Palmer Stadium; Princeton, NJ	W 14–7	22,500	
November 5	at Harvard	Harvard Stadium; Boston, MA (rivalry)	L 6–7	21,000	
November 12	Yale	Palmer Stadium; Princeton, NJ (rivalry)	W 13–0	46,000	
November 19	Dartmouth	Palmer Stadium; Princeton, NJ	W 6–3	20,000	
