= 1955 Dartmouth Indians football team =

American college football season

1955 Dartmouth Indians football
- Conference: Ivy League
- Record: 3–6 (3–3 Ivy)
- Head coach: Bob Blackman (1st season)
- Captain: Leo McKenna
- Home stadium: Memorial Field

1955 Ivy League football standings
	Conf.					Overall
Team	W		L		T	W		L		T
Princeton	6	–	1	–	0	7	–	2	–	0
Yale	5	–	1	–	0	7	–	2	–	0
Dartmouth	3	–	3	–	0	3	–	6	–	0
Cornell	4	–	3	–	0	5	–	4	–	0
Harvard	2	–	4	–	0	3	–	4	–	1
Brown	2	–	4	–	0	2	–	6	–	0
Columbia	1	–	5	–	0	1	–	8	–	0
Penn	0	–	1	–	0	0	–	8	–	0
The Ivy League did not crown an official champion until 1956 when full league play began.

The 1955 Dartmouth Indians football team was an American football team that represented Dartmouth College as an independent during the 1955 college football season. In their first season under head coach Bob Blackman, the Indians compiled a 3–6 record, and were outscored 120 to 92. Leo McKennawas the team captain.

This would be Dartmouth's final year as a football independent, as the Ivy League, which Dartmouth had helped co-found in 1954, began football competition in 1956. Six of the nine opponents on the Indians' 1955 schedule were Ivy League members (with Penn the only Ivy not scheduled); for decades, (future) Ivy members had comprised a large portion of Dartmouth's opponents.

Dartmouth played its home games at Memorial Field on the college campus in Hanover, New Hampshire.

== Schedule ==
Date	Opponent	Site	Result	Attendance	Source
September 24	at Colgate	Colgate Athletic Field; Hamilton, NY	L 20–21	8,000	
October 1	Holy Cross	Memorial Field; Hanover, NH	L 21–29		
October 8	at Brown	Brown Stadium; Providence, RI	L 0–7	15,000	
October 15	at Lafayette	Fisher Field; Easton, PA	L 13–21		
October 22	Harvard	Memorial Field; Hanover, NH (rivalry)	W 14–9	13,500	
October 29	at Yale	Yale Bowl; New Haven, CT	L 0–20	32,000	
November 5	at Columbia	Baker Field; New York, NY	W 14–7	10,000	
November 12	Cornell	Memorial Field; Hanover, NH (rivalry)	W 7–0	11,500	
November 19	at Princeton	Palmer Stadium; Princeton, NJ	L 3–6	20,000	
