= 1993 Trinity Bantams football team =

American college football season

1993 Trinity Bantams football
- Conference: New England Small College Athletic Conference
- Record: 8–0 (8–0 NESCAC)
- Head coach: Don Miller (27th season)
- Home stadium: Dan Jesse Field

1993 New England Small College Athletic Conference football standings
	Conf.					Overall
Team	W		L		T	W		L		T
Trinity (CT)	8	–	0	–	0	8	–	0	–	0
Williams	7	–	1	–	0	7	–	1	–	0
Wesleyan	6	–	2	–	0	6	–	2	–	0
Colby	5	–	2	–	1	5	–	2	–	1
Middlebury	5	–	3	–	0	5	–	3	–	0
Bowdoin	3	–	4	–	1	3	–	4	–	1
Amherst	3	–	5	–	0	3	–	5	–	0
Hamilton	1	–	7	–	0	1	–	7	–	0
Tufts	1	–	7	–	0	1	–	7	–	0
Bates	0	–	8	–	0	0	–	8	–	0
No conference champion recognized

The 1993 Trinity Bantams football team was an American football team that represented Trinity College of Hartford, Connecticut as a member of the New England Small College Athletic Conference (NESCAC) during the 1993 NCAA Division III football season. In their 27th season under head coach Don Miller, the Bantams compiled a perfect 8–0 record and outscored opponents by a total of 355 to 85. It was Trinity's first undefeated and perfect season since the 1955 Trinity team went 7–0.

The 1993 season was one of several perfect seasons for the Trinity football program, including 1934, 1949, 1954, 1955, 2003, 2004, 2005, 2008, 2012, 2016, and 2022.

The team played its home games at Dan Jesse Field in Hartford.

== Schedule ==
Date	Time	Opponent	Site	Result	Attendance	Source
September 25	1:30 p.m.	at Bates	Garcelon Field; Lewiston, ME	W 71–0	1,000	
October 2		Williams	Dan Jesse Field; Hartford, CT	W 21–7	7,255	
October 9		Hamilton	Dan Jesse Field; Hartford, CT	W 34–0	1,012	
October 16		at Tufts	Ellis Oval; Medford, MA	W 55–30	5,019	
October 23		Bowdoin	Dan Jesse Field; Hartford, CT	W 63–7	2,742	
October 30		at Middlebury	Youngman Field; Middlebury, VT	W 43–14		
November 6	1:30 p.m.	at Amherst	Pratt Field; Amherst, MA	W 36–19	3,714	
November 13		Wesleyan	Dan Jesse Field; Hartford, CT (rivalry)	W 32–8	9,102	
All times are in Eastern time
