= 2022 Trinity Bantams football team =

American college football season

2022 Trinity Bantams football

NESCAC champion
- Conference: New England Small College Athletic Conference
- Record: 9–0 (9–0 NESCAC)
- Head coach: Jeff Devanney (17th season)
- Home stadium: Jessee/Miller Field

2022 New England Small College Athletic Conference football standings
	Conf.			Overall
Team	W		L	W		L
Trinity (CT) $	9	–	0	9	–	0
Middlebury	7	–	2	7	–	2
Tufts	6	–	3	6	–	3
Wesleyan	6	–	3	6	–	3
Colby	4	–	5	4	–	5
Bates	3	–	6	3	–	6
Bowdoin	3	–	6	3	–	6
Williams	3	–	6	3	–	6
Hamilton	2	–	7	2	–	7
Amherst	2	–	7	2	–	7
$ – Conference champion

The 2022 Trinity Bantams football team was an American football team that represented Trinity College of Hartford, Connecticut as a member of the New England Small College Athletic Conference (NESCAC) during the 2022 NCAA Division III football season. In their 17th season under head coach Jeff Devanney, the Bantams compiled a perfect 9–0 record and won the NESCAC championship.

The 2022 season was one of several perfect seasons for the Trinity football program, including 1934, 1949, 1954, 1955, 1993, 2003, 2004, 2005, 2008, 2012, and 2016.

The team played its home games at Jessee/Miller Field in Hartford.

== Schedule ==
Date	Time	Opponent	Site	Result	Attendance	Source
September 17	1:30 p.m.	at Tufts	Ellis Oval; Somerville, MA	W 26–23	2,800	
September 24	1:30 p.m.	Colby^{†}	Jessee/Miller Field; Hartford, CT	W 19–7		
October 1	1:00 p.m.	at Amherst	Pratt Field; Amherst, MA	W 20–3	1,000	
October 8	1:30 p.m.	Hamilton	Jessee/Miller Field; Hartford, CT	W 45–0		
October 15	1:00 p.m.	at Middlebury	Youngman Field at Alumni Stadium; Middlebury, VT	W 27–21	1,250	
October 22	2:30 p.m.	Williams	Jessee/Miller Field; Hartford, CT	W 32–13		
October 29	1:30 p.m.	Bowdoin	Jessee/Miller Field; Hartford, CT	W 38–3	2,411	
November 5	1:30 p.m.	at Bates	Garcelon Field; Lewiston, ME	W 63–14	2,800	
November 12	12:00 p.m.	Wesleyan	Jessee/Miller Field; Hartford, CT (rivalry)	W 31–14	1,250	
^{†}Homecoming; All times are in Eastern time
