= 2008 Trinity Bantams football team =

American college football season

2008 Trinity Bantams football

NESCAC champion
- Conference: New England Small College Athletic Conference
- Record: 8–0 (8–0 NESCAC)
- Head coach: Jeff Devanney (3rd season)
- Offensive coordinator: Chris Rorke (3rd season)
- Home stadium: Jessee/Miller Field

2008 New England Small College Athletic Conference football standings
	Conf.			Overall
Team	W		L	W		L
Trinity (CT) $	8	–	0	8	–	0
Williams	6	–	2	6	–	2
Amherst	5	–	3	5	–	3
Middlebury	5	–	3	5	–	3
Bowdoin	4	–	4	4	–	4
Tufts	4	–	4	4	–	4
Colby	3	–	5	3	–	5
Bates	2	–	6	2	–	6
Hamilton	2	–	6	2	–	6
Wesleyan	1	–	7	1	–	7
$ – Conference champion

The 2008 Trinity Bantams football team was an American football team that represented Trinity College of Hartford, Connecticut as a member of the New England Small College Athletic Conference (NESCAC) during the 2008 NCAA Division III football season. In their third season under head coach Jeff Devanney, the Bantams compiled a perfect 8–0 record and won the NESCAC championship.

The 2008 season was one of several perfect seasons for the Trinity football program, including 1934, 1949, 1954, 1955, 1993, 2003, 2004, 2005, 2012, 2016, and 2022.

The team played its home games at Jessee/Miller Field in Hartford.

== Schedule ==
Date	Time	Opponent	Site	Result	Attendance	Source
September 20	1:00 p.m.	Bates	Jessee/Miller Field; Hartford, CT	W 17–7		
September 27	1:30 p.m.	at Williams	Weston Field; Williamstown, MA	W 20–17		
October 4	12:30 p.m.	at Hamilton	Steuben Field; Clinton, NY	W 20–15		
October 11	1:30 p.m.	Tufts	Jessee/Miller Field; Hartford, CT	W 28–27 ^{OT}		
October 18	1:00 p.m.	at Bowdoin	Whittier Field; Brunswick, ME	W 40–16		
October 25	1:00 p.m.	Middlebury	Jessee/Miller Field; Hartford, CT	W 34–31		
November 1	1:00 p.m.	Amherst	Jessee/Miller Field; Hartford, CT	W 30–13		
November 8	12:00 p.m.	at Wesleyan	Corwin Field; Middletown, CT (rivalry)	W 38–14		
All times are in Eastern time
