= 2012 Trinity Bantams football team =

American college football season

2012 Trinity Bantams football

NESCAC champion
- Conference: New England Small College Athletic Conference
- Record: 8–0 (8–0 NESCAC)
- Head coach: Jeff Devanney (7th season)
- Home stadium: Jessee/Miller Field

2012 New England Small College Athletic Conference football standings
	Conf.			Overall
Team	W		L	W		L
Trinity (CT) $	8	–	0	8	–	0
Middlebury	7	–	1	7	–	1
Amherst	6	–	2	6	–	2
Bates	5	–	3	5	–	3
Wesleyan	5	–	3	5	–	3
Williams	4	–	4	4	–	4
Colby	3	–	5	3	–	5
Bowdoin	1	–	7	1	–	7
Hamilton	1	–	7	1	–	7
Tufts	0	–	8	0	–	8
$ – Conference champion

The 2012 Trinity Bantams football team was an American football team that represented Trinity College of Hartford, Connecticut as a member of the New England Small College Athletic Conference (NESCAC) during the 2012 NCAA Division III football season. In their seventh season under head coach Jeff Devanney, the Bantams compiled a perfect 8–0 record, won the NESCAC championship, and outscored opponents by a total of 281 to 111.

The 2012 season was one of several perfect seasons for the Trinity football program, including 1934, 1949, 1954, 1955, 1993, 2003, 2004, 2005, 2008, 2016, and 2022.

The team played its home games at Jessee/Miller Field in Hartford.

== Schedule ==
Date	Time	Opponent	Site	Result	Attendance	Source
September 22	1:00 p.m.	Bates	Jessee/Miller Field; Hartford, CT	W 37–16	4,711	
September 29	1:30 p.m.	at Williams	Weston Field; Williamstown, MA	W 17–13	871	
October 6	1:00 p.m.	at Hamilton	Steuben Field; Clinton, NY	W 53–14	1,177	
October 13	1:30 p.m.	Tufts	Jessee/Miller Field; Hartford, CT	W 40–7	3,411	
October 20	1:00 p.m.	at Bowdoin	Whittier Field; Brunswick, ME	W 27–10	2,037	
October 27	12:30 p.m.	Middlebury	Jessee/Miller Field; Hartford, CT	W 45–7	2,921	
November 3	12:30 p.m.	Amherst	Jessee/Miller Field; Hartford, CT	W 32–20	7,219	
November 10	12:00 p.m.	at Wesleyan	Andrus Field; Middletown, CT (rivalry)	W 30–24	3,540	
All times are in Eastern time
