= 2016 Trinity Bantams football team =

American college football season

2016 Trinity Bantams football

NESCAC champion
- Conference: New England Small College Athletic Conference
- Record: 8–0 (8–0 NESCAC)
- Head coach: Jeff Devanney (11th season)
- Home stadium: Jessee/Miller Field

2016 New England Small College Athletic Conference football standings
	Conf.			Overall
Team	W		L	W		L
Trinity (CT) $	8	–	0	8	–	0
Tufts	7	–	1	7	–	1
Middlebury	6	–	2	6	–	2
Wesleyan	6	–	2	6	–	2
Amherst	4	–	4	4	–	4
Bates	3	–	5	3	–	5
Colby	3	–	5	3	–	5
Hamilton	3	–	5	3	–	5
Bowdoin	0	–	8	0	–	8
Williams	0	–	8	0	–	8
$ – Conference champion

The 2016 Trinity Bantams football team was an American football team that represented Trinity College of Hartford, Connecticut as a member of the New England Small College Athletic Conference (NESCAC) during the 2016 NCAA Division III football season. In their 11th season under head coach Jeff Devanney, the Bantams compiled a perfect 8–0 record and won the NESCAC championship.

The 2016 season was one of several perfect seasons for the Trinity football program, including 1934, 1949, 1954, 1955, 1993, 2003, 2004, 2005, 2008, 2012, and 2022.

The team played its home games at Jessee/Miller Field in Hartford.

== Schedule ==
Date	Time	Opponent	Site	Result	Attendance	Source
September 24	1:00 p.m.	Bates	Jessee/Miller Field; Hartford, CT	W 38–7	3,888	
October 1	1:30 p.m.	at Williams	Farley-Lamb Field; Williamstown, MA	W 38–13	978	
October 8	1:00 p.m.	at Hamilton	Steuben Field; Clinton, NY	W 37–6	2,177	
October 15	1:30 p.m.	Tufts	Jessee/Miller Field; Hartford, CT	W 36–28	2,421	
October 22	12:30 p.m.	at Bowdoin	Whittier Field; Brunswick, ME	W 38–7	1,004	
October 29	12:30 p.m.	Middlebury	Jessee/Miller Field; Hartford, CT	W 49–13	2,799	
November 5	12:30 p.m.	Amherst	Jessee/Miller Field; Hartford, CT	W 24–14	5,395	
November 12	12:00 p.m.	at Wesleyan	Corwin Stadium; Middletown, CT (rivalry)	W 45–21	6,806	
All times are in Eastern time
