= 2023 Tufts Jumbos football team =

American college football season

2023 Tufts Jumbos football
- Conference: New England Small College Athletic Conference
- Record: 6–3 (6–3 NESCAC)
- Head coach: Jay Civetti (13th season)
- Co-offensive coordinators: Frank Hauser (2nd season); Mike MacDonald (1st season)
- Home stadium: Ellis Oval

2023 New England Small College Athletic Conference football standings
	Conf.			Overall
Team	W		L	W		L
Middlebury +	8	–	1	8	–	1
Trinity (CT) +	8	–	1	8	–	1
Tufts	6	–	3	6	–	3
Wesleyan	6	–	3	6	–	3
Amherst	4	–	5	4	–	5
Bowdoin	4	–	5	4	–	5
Colby	3	–	6	3	–	6
Hamilton	3	–	6	3	–	6
Williams	3	–	6	3	–	6
Bates	0	–	9	0	–	9
+ – Conference co-champions

The 2023 Tufts Jumbos football team represented Tufts University as a member of the New England Small College Athletic Conference (NESCAC) during the 2023 NCAA Division III football season. Led by 13th-year head coach Jay Civetti, the Jumbos compiled a record of 6–3 with all games played against conference opponents, tying for third place in the NESCAC. Tufts played home games at Ellis Oval in Medford, Massachusetts.

== Schedule ==
Date	Time	Opponent	Site	Result	Attendance
September 16	1:30 p.m.	at Trinity (CT)	Jessee/Miller Field; Hartford, CT	L 19–44	2,112
September 23	6:30 p.m.	Bates^{†}	Ellis Oval; Medford, MA	W 44–16	4,166
September 30	1:30 p.m.	Williams	Ellis Oval; Medford, MA	W 28–10	3,166
October 7	6:30 p.m.	at Bowdoin	Whittier Field; Brunswick, ME	W 24–10	750
October 14	6:30 p.m.	Wesleyan	Ellis Oval; Medford, MA	W 49–14	4,712
October 21	1:00 p.m.	at Amherst	Pratt Field; Amherst, MA	W 34–14	1,345
October 28	1:00 p.m.	at Hamilton	Steuben Field; Clinton, NY	L 34–36 ^{5OT}	827
November 4	1:00 p.m.	Colby	Ellis Oval; Medford, MA	W 38–0	3,147
November 11	12:30 p.m.	at Middlebury	Youngman Field at Alumni Stadium; Middlebury, VT	L 10–19	1,328
^{†}Homecoming; All times are in Eastern time
