= 2018 Tufts Jumbos football team =

American college football season

2018 Tufts Jumbos football
- Conference: New England Small College Athletic Conference
- Record: 7–2 (7–2 NESCAC)
- Head coach: Jay Civetti (8th season)
- Home stadium: Ellis Oval

2018 New England Small College Athletic Conference football standings
	Conf.			Overall
Team	W		L	W		L
Amherst +	8	–	1	8	–	1
Trinity (CT) +	8	–	1	8	–	1
Tufts	7	–	2	7	–	2
Middlebury	5	–	4	5	–	4
Wesleyan	5	–	4	5	–	4
Williams	5	–	4	5	–	4
Colby	2	–	7	2	–	7
Hamilton	2	–	7	2	–	7
Bowdoin	1	–	8	1	–	8
Bates	0	–	9	0	–	9
+ – Conference co-champions

The 2018 Tufts Jumbos football team represented Tufts University as a member of the New England Small College Athletic Conference (NESCAC) during the 2018 NCAA Division III football season. Led by eighth-year head coach Jay Civetti, the Jumbos compiled a record of 7–2 with all games played against conference opponents, placing third in the NESCAC. Tufts played home games at Ellis Oval in Medford, Massachusetts.

== Schedule ==
Date	Time	Opponent	Site	Result	Attendance
September 15	1:00 p.m.	at Hamilton	Steuben Field; Clinton, NY	W 29–2	1,075
September 22	6:00 p.m.	Wesleyan	Ellis Oval; Medford, MA	W 16–13	4,000
September 29	1:30 p.m.	Bates^{†}	Ellis Oval; Medford, MA	W 47–14	3,975
October 6	1:30 p.m.	at Bowdoin	Whittier Field; Brunswick, ME	W 28–0	2,012
October 13	1:30 p.m.	at Trinity (CT)	Jessee/Miller Field; Hartford, CT	L 24–38	4,666
October 20	1:30 p.m.	Williams	Ellis Oval; Medford, MA	W 28–21	3,300
October 27	1:00 p.m.	at Amherst	Pratt Field; Amherst, MA	L 13–19	377
November 3	1:00 p.m.	Colby	Ellis Oval; Medford, MA	W 48–0	2,200
November 10	12:30 p.m.	at Middlebury	Youngman Field; Middlebury, VT	W 35–13	1,650
^{†}Homecoming; All times are in Eastern time
