= 2016 Tufts Jumbos football team =

American college football season

2016 Tufts Jumbos football
- Conference: New England Small College Athletic Conference
- Record: 7–1 (7–1 NESCAC)
- Head coach: Jay Civetti (6th season)
- Home stadium: Ellis Oval

2016 New England Small College Athletic Conference football standings
	Conf.			Overall
Team	W		L	W		L
Trinity (CT) $	8	–	0	8	–	0
Tufts	7	–	1	7	–	1
Middlebury	6	–	2	6	–	2
Wesleyan	6	–	2	6	–	2
Amherst	4	–	4	4	–	4
Bates	3	–	5	3	–	5
Colby	3	–	5	3	–	5
Hamilton	3	–	5	3	–	5
Bowdoin	0	–	8	0	–	8
Williams	0	–	8	0	–	8
$ – Conference champion

The 2016 Tufts Jumbos football team represented Tufts University as a member of the New England Small College Athletic Conference (NESCAC) during the 2016 NCAA Division III football season. Led by sixth-year head coach Jay Civetti, the Jumbos compiled a record of 7–1 with all games played against conference opponents, placing second in the NESCAC. Tufts played home games at Ellis Oval in Medford, Massachusetts.

The Jumbos opened their season with a dramatic 17–14 comeback victory over Wesleyan. Running back Chance Brady was a standout performer throughout the season, setting several program records, including career rushing touchdowns. Tufts had close wins over Bates and Williams and a victory in a high-scoring finale against Middlebury. The team was particularly successful at home, finishing 4–0 at Ellis Oval.

== Schedule ==
Date	Time	Opponent	Site	Result	Attendance	Source
September 24	6:00 p.m.	Wesleyan	Ellis Oval; Medford, MA	W 17–14	6,432	
October 1	1:00 p.m.	Bates^{†}	Ellis Oval; Medford, MA	W 12–7	1,043	
October 8	2:00 p.m.	at Bowdoin	Whittier Field; Brunswick, ME	W 41–21	1,881	
October 15	1:30 p.m.	at Trinity (CT)	Jessee/Miller Field; Hartford, CT	L 28–36	2,421	
October 22	1:30 p.m.	Williams	Ellis Oval; Medford, MA	W 35–16	1,123	
October 29	1:00 p.m.	at Amherst	Pratt Field; Amherst, MA	W 27–10	3,410	
November 5	1:00 p.m.	Colby	Ellis Oval; Medford, MA	W 44–12	894	
November 12	12:30 p.m.	at Middlebury	Youngman Field at Alumni Stadium; Middlebury, VT	W 48–35	1,850	
^{†}Homecoming; All times are in Eastern time
