= Jay Civetti =

American football player and coach (born 1979)

Current position
- Title: Head coach
- Team: Tufts
- Conference: NESCAC
- Record: 60–60

Biographical details
- Born: May 11, 1979 (age 47)

Playing career
- 1997–2000: Trinity (CT)
- Position: Offensive lineman

Coaching career (HC unless noted)
- 2001–2002: Milton HS (MA) (assistant)
- 2003–2006: Boston College (assistant)
- 2007: NC State (WR)
- 2008–2010: Tufts (OC)
- 2011–present: Tufts

Head coaching record
- Overall: 60–60

Jay P. Civetti Jr. (born May 11, 1979) is an American college football coach and former player. He is the head football coach for Tufts University, a position he has held since 2011. During his time at Tufts, Civetti helped end the school's 31-game losing streak, and he later led the team to three consecutive winning seasons.

== Pre-Tufts career ==
Civetti attended Belmont Hill School in Belmont, Massachusetts. Having been recruited by coach Don Miller, Civetti played college football as an offensive lineman at Trinity College in Hartford, Connecticut from 1997 to 2000. Civetti started all 32 games that Trinity played during his time there. During his first season with the Bantams, Civetti was the ECAC Rookie of the Year. During his senior season, he served as Trinity's co-captain and earned First Team All-NESCAC honors.

After graduating from Trinity with an English degree in 2001, Civetti briefly pursued a career in information technology consulting. In less than a year, however, Civetti left the IT firm and accepted a job coaching football and teaching special education at Milton High School in Milton, Massachusetts.

In 2003, Civetti joined the staff of Boston College football coach Tom O'Brien as a graduate assistant. Between 2003 and 2006, Civetti served as an assistant under O'Brien and earned a master's degree in education from the school in 2006. While at Boston College, Civetti helped coach quarterback Matt Ryan, a future NFL Most Valuable Player. Civetti followed O'Brien to North Carolina State University in 2007, where he served as a wide receivers coach for the team.

== Tufts career ==
Civetti joined the Tufts football program in 2008 as offensive coordinator and tight ends coach.

In 2009 – after the conclusion of Tufts' season – Civetti returned to NC State to serve as the temporary offensive coordinator following Dana Bible's diagnosis of leukemia. During Civetti's sole game at the helm of the offense, NC State beat its biggest rival, the University of North Carolina Tar Heels, 28–27. Three members of the 2009 Wolfpack team went on to play in the NFL: tight end T. J. Graham, offensive lineman Ted Larsen, and Super Bowl-winning quarterback Russell Wilson.

Civetti was promoted to interim Tufts head coach in January 2011, replacing longtime head coach Bill Samko. On October 28, 2011, Civetti shed the interim label. The Jumbos went 0–8 in each of his first three seasons as head coach.

On September 20, 2014, in its season opener, Tufts beat the Hamilton Continentals, 24–17, to break its 31-game losing stream (dating back to September 2010) and record Civetti's first win as head coach. "That's what this program does: it fights regardless," Civetti told the team in an impassioned postgame speech. "We've seen things, been places, and done things that not the average man can handle. You are uncommon. You are special. You are unique. You are Jumbo Pride." The team finished the year at 4–4, including an undefeated record at home.

On October 24, 2015, Tufts beat the Williams Ephs in an away game for the first time since 1981. After the game, a video of Civetti dancing and celebrating in the locker room – capped by the Tufts coach doing the splits – briefly went viral. The Jumbos also defeated the Middlebury Panthers, 31–28, for the first time since 2001.

On October 29, 2016, Tufts beat the Amherst Purple and White for the first time since 2007 in a 27–10 victory. That year, Civetti coached the Jumbos to a second-place finish in the NESCAC with a 7–1 record, finishing with the program's best regular season showing since 1998. Under Civetti's tutelage, senior tri-captain running back Shayne "Chance" Brady was named the NESCAC Offensive Player of the Year for the second consecutive year, while first-year linebacker Greg Holt was named the NESCAC Rookie of the Year. Four other players were also named to the All-NESCAC first team, including senior kicker/punter Willie Holmquist, who later joined the Duke Blue Devils as a graduate walk-on. On account of these successes, the Gridiron Club of Greater Boston named Civetti the 2016 Division III Coach of the Year.

While at Tufts, Civetti has worked with Team IMPACT to help provide support for children suffering from potentially terminal illnesses.

== Head coaching record ==
Year	Team	Overall	Conference	Standing	Bowl/playoffs
Tufts Jumbos (New England Small College Athletic Conference) (2011–present)
2011	Tufts	0–8	0–8	10th	
2012	Tufts	0–8	0–8	10th	
2013	Tufts	0–8	0–8	T–9th	
2014	Tufts	4–4	4–4	T–5th	
2015	Tufts	6–2	6–2	3rd	
2016	Tufts	7–1	7–1	2nd	
2017	Tufts	5–4	5–4	6th	
2018	Tufts	7–2	7–2	3rd	
2019	Tufts	4–5	4–5	T–5th	
2020–21	No team—COVID-19				
2021	Tufts	4–5	4–5	T–5th	
2022	Tufts	6–3	6–3	T–3rd	
2023	Tufts	6–3	6–3	T–3rd	
2024	Tufts	7–2	7–2	T–2nd	
2025	Tufts	4–5	4–5	7th	
2026	Tufts	0–0	0–0		
Tufts:		60–60	60–60		
Total:		60–60			
