= Frank Hauser =

Frank Hauser may refer to:

- Frank Hauser (American football) (born 1957), American football coach
- Frank Hauser (director) (1922–2007), British theatre director
