= List of Stony Brook Seawolves head football coaches =

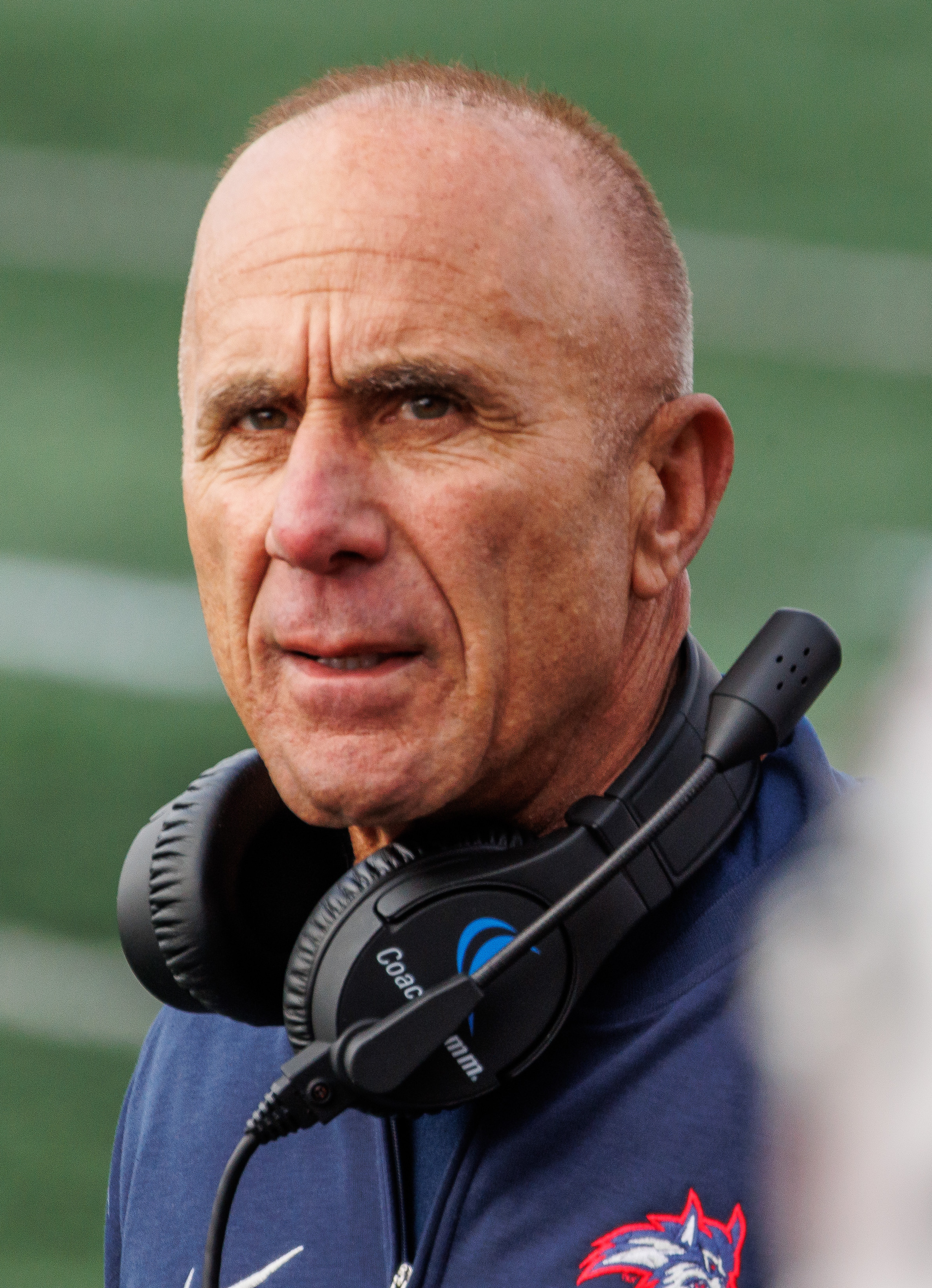
Chuck Priore was head coach for 18 years, from 2006 to 2023.

The Stony Brook Seawolves football program is a college football team that represents the State University of New York at Stony Brook in the Football Championship Subdivision (FCS) of National Collegiate Athletic Association Division I. They will begin play in the Colonial Athletic Association (CAA) in 2013, after having played the previous five seasons in the Big South Conference. The Seawolves have played nearly 300 games during their 29 seasons of play, winning slightly over half of the contests for a winning percentage of .513.

In its short history, Stony Brook has had two head coaches since its first NCAA sanctioned season in 1984. Sam Kornhauser was the team's first head coach and guided the Seawolves through twenty-two seasons. As a head coach, Kornhauser transitioned the football team from a regional Division III program to a Division I program culminating his career with Stony Brook's first ever Division I conference championship as a member of the Northeast Conference.

In 2006, Chuck Priore took the reins of the program. Together with the administration, he elevated Stony Brook football from a non-scholarship program to a program that funds the FCS maximum of 63 scholarships. Priore led the Seawolves to four consecutive Big South Conference championships (2009 through 2012). In 2011, Stony Brook claimed their first ever NCAA Division I Football Championship (FCS playoff) bid and advanced to the second round of the tournament. The Seawolves returned to the FCS playoffs in 2012, again advancing to the second round. Priore has also worked with the administration to increase the strength of schedule and grow the program as a national power in Division I FCS.

== Key ==
Key to symbols in coaches list
General		Overall		Conference		Postseason (Note: Although the first Rose Bowl Game was played in 1902, it has been continuously played since the 1916 game, and is recognized as the oldest bowl game by the NCAA. "—" indicates any season prior to 1916 when postseason games were not played.)	
No.	Order of coaches (Note: A running total of the number of head coaches, with coaches who served separate tenures being counted only once. Interim head coaches are represented with "Int" and are not counted in the running total. "—" indicates the team played but either without a coach or no coach is on record. "X" indicates an interim year without play.)	GC	Games coached	CW	Conference wins	PW	Postseason wins
DC	Division championships	OW	Overall wins	CL	Conference losses	PL	Postseason losses
CC	Conference championships	OL	Overall losses	CT	Conference ties	PT	Postseason ties
NC	National championships	OT	Overall ties (Note: Overtime rules in college football were introduced in 1996, making ties impossible in the period since.)	C%	Conference winning percentage		
†	Elected to the College Football Hall of Fame	O%	Overall winning percentage (Note: When computing the win–loss percentage, a tie counts as half a win and half a loss.)				

== Coaches ==
No.	Name	Term	GC	OW	OL	OT	O%	CW	CL	CT	C%	PW	PL	CCs
1	Sam Kornhauser	1984–2005	217	105	110	2	0.488	57	62	0	0.479	0	0	1
2	Chuck Priore	2006–2023	198	97	101	—	0.490	63	57	—	0.525	3	4	4
3	Billy Cosh	2024–present	24	14	10	—	0.583	9	7	—	0.563	0	0	0
