= 2022 Tufts Jumbos football team =

American college football season

2022 Tufts Jumbos football
- Conference: New England Small College Athletic Conference
- Record: 6–3 (6–3 NESCAC)
- Head coach: Jay Civetti (12th season)
- Offensive coordinator: Frank Hauser (1st season)
- Defensive coordinator: Justin Manning (1st season)
- Home stadium: Ellis Oval

2022 New England Small College Athletic Conference football standings
	Conf.			Overall
Team	W		L	W		L
Trinity (CT) $	9	–	0	9	–	0
Middlebury	7	–	2	7	–	2
Tufts	6	–	3	6	–	3
Wesleyan	6	–	3	6	–	3
Colby	4	–	5	4	–	5
Bates	3	–	6	3	–	6
Bowdoin	3	–	6	3	–	6
Williams	3	–	6	3	–	6
Hamilton	2	–	7	2	–	7
Amherst	2	–	7	2	–	7
$ – Conference champion

The 2022 Tufts Jumbos football team represented Tufts University as a member of the New England Small College Athletic Conference (NESCAC) during the 2022 NCAA Division III football season. Led by 12th-year head coach Jay Civetti, the Jumbos compiled a record of 6–3 with all games played against conference opponents, tying for third place in the NESCAC. Tufts played home games at Ellis Oval in Medford, Massachusetts.

== Schedule ==
Date	Time	Opponent	Site	Result	Attendance
September 17	1:30 p.m.	Trinity (CT)	Ellis Oval; Medford, MA	L 23–26	2,800
September 24	1:30 p.m.	at Bates	Garcelon Field; Lewiston, ME	W 35–7	750
October 1	1:30 p.m.	at Williams	Weston Field; Williamstown, MA	W 35–28	1,800
October 8	6:30 p.m.	Bowdoin^{†}	Ellis Oval; Medford, MA	W 31–13	4,500
October 15	6:00 p.m.	at Wesleyan	Andrus Field; Middletown, CT	L 22–26	5,600
October 22	1:00 p.m.	Amherst	Ellis Oval; Medford, MA	L 17–20	2,166
October 29	1:00 p.m.	Hamilton	Ellis Oval; Medford, MA	W 49–13	1,022
November 5	1:00 p.m.	at Colby	Seaverns Field; Waterville, ME	W 35–7	850
November 12	12:30 p.m.	Middlebury	Ellis Oval; Medford, MA	W 65–34	1,700
^{†}Homecoming; All times are in Eastern time
