= 2024 Tufts Jumbos football team =

American college football season

2024 Tufts Jumbos football
- Conference: New England Small College Athletic Conference
- Record: 7–2 (7–2 NESCAC)
- Head coach: Jay Civetti (14th season)
- Offensive coordinator: Mike MacDonald (2nd season)
- Co-defensive coordinators: Kenn Jones (1st season); Tino Lopes (1st season)
- Home stadium: Ellis Oval

2024 New England Small College Athletic Conference football standings
	Conf.			Overall
Team	W		L	W		L
Wesleyan $	8	–	1	8	–	1
Trinity (CT)	7	–	2	7	–	2
Tufts	7	–	2	7	–	2
Middlebury	6	–	3	6	–	3
Williams	5	–	4	5	–	4
Colby	4	–	5	4	–	5
Bowdoin	3	–	6	3	–	6
Amherst	2	–	7	2	–	7
Bates	2	–	7	2	–	7
Hamilton	1	–	8	1	–	8
$ – Conference champion

The 2024 Tufts Jumbos football team represented Tufts University as a member of the New England Small College Athletic Conference (NESCAC) during the 2024 NCAA Division III football season. Led by 14th-year head coach Jay Civetti, the Jumbos compiled a record of 7–2 with all games played against conference opponents, tying for second place in the NESCAC. Tufts played home games at Ellis Oval in Medford, Massachusetts.

== Schedule ==
Date	Time	Opponent	Site	Result	Attendance
September 14	6:00 p.m.	Bowdoin^{†}	Ellis Oval; Medford, MA	W 23–21	4,322
September 21	7:00 p.m.	at Wesleyan	Andrus Field; Middletown, CT	L 9–20	3,701
September 28	1:00 p.m.	Amherst	Ellis Oval; Medford, MA	W 25–0	2,122
October 5	1:30 p.m.	Trinity (CT)	Ellis Oval; Medford, MA	L 24–42	3,788
October 12	6:00 p.m.	at Bates	Garcelon Field; Lewiston, ME	W 45–22	850
October 19	1:00 p.m.	Hamilton	Ellis Oval; Medford, MA	W 20–13	1,522
October 26	1:30 p.m.	at Williams	Weston Field; Williamstown, MA	W 27–24	973
November 2	1:00 p.m.	at Colby	Seaverns Field; Waterville, ME	W 28–21	725
November 9	12:30 p.m.	Middlebury	Ellis Oval; Medford, MA	W 17–7	5,255
^{†}Homecoming; All times are in Eastern time
