= 2005 Trinity Bantams football team =

American college football season

2005 Trinity Bantams football

NESCAC champion
- Conference: New England Small College Athletic Conference
- Record: 8–0 (8–0 NESCAC)
- Head coach: Chuck Priore (6th season)
- Offensive coordinator: Jeff Behrman (2nd season)
- Defensive coordinator: Jeff Devanney (1st season)
- Captains: Michael Blair; Brian Dubiel; Avon Morgan; Kevin Quinn
- Home stadium: Jessee/Miller Field

2005 New England Small College Athletic Conference football standings
	Conf.			Overall
Team	W		L	W		L
No. 25 Trinity (CT) $	8	–	0	8	–	0
Colby	7	–	1	7	–	1
Bowdoin	6	–	2	6	–	2
Williams	6	–	2	6	–	2
Amherst	5	–	3	5	–	3
Middlebury	3	–	5	3	–	5
Bates	2	–	6	2	–	6
Tufts	2	–	6	2	–	6
Hamilton	1	–	7	1	–	7
Wesleyan	0	–	8	0	–	8
$ – Conference champion; Rankings from D3football.com

The 2005 Trinity Bantams football team was an American football team that represented Trinity College of Hartford, Connecticut as a member of the New England Small College Athletic Conference (NESCAC) during the 2005 NCAA Division III football season. In their sixth and final season under head coach Chuck Priore, the Bantams compiled a perfect 8–0 record and won the NESCAC championship.

The 2005 season was Trinity's fourth consecutive NESCAC championship and part of a 31-game winning streak that began on October 5, 2002, ended on September 30, 2006, and included perfect seasons in 2003, 2004, and 2005.

The team played its home games at Jessee/Miller Field in Hartford.

== Schedule ==
Date	Time	Opponent	Site	Result	Attendance	Source
September 24	1:00 p.m.	at Bates	Garcelon Field; Lewiston, ME	W 47–0		
October 1		Williams	Jessee/Miller Field; Hartford, CT	W 34–6		
October 8		Hamilton	Jessee/Miller Field; Hartford, CT	W 58–0		
October 15		at Tufts	Ellis Oval; Medford, MA	W 7–0		
October 22		Bowdoin	Jessee/Miller Field; Hartford, CT	W 23–3		
October 29		at Middlebury	Youngman Field at Alumni Stadium; Middlebury, VT	W 14–0	950	
November 5		at Amherst	Pratt Field; Amherst, MA	W 30–20	4,000	
November 12		Wesleyan	Jessee/Miller Field; Hartford, CT (rivalry)	W 63–7	5,136	
All times are in Eastern time
