= Lupan (disambiguation) =

The lupan is a Chinese magnetic compass, also known as a feng shui compass.

Lupan may also refer to:

- Lupan (surname)
- Lupan River, a tributary of the Motnău River in Romania
