= Lupan (surname) =

Lupan is a surname. Notable people with the surname include:

- Andrei Lupan (1912–1992), Moldovan writer and politician
- Nicolae Lupan (1921–2017), Bessarabian journalist
- Vlad Lupan (born 1971), Moldovan diplomat and journalist

== See also ==
- Luman (name)
