= Lewis Manly =

American athlete and academic economist (1903–1970)

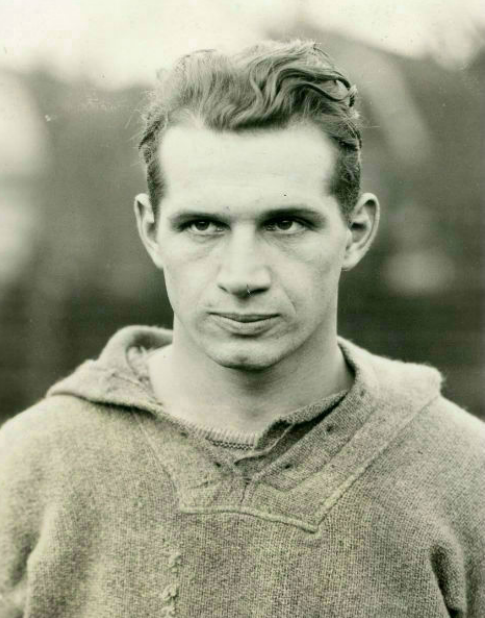
- Manly at Wooster

Biographical details
- Born: April 23, 1903; Erie, Pennsylvania, U.S.
- Died: November 2, 1970 (aged 67); Plattsburgh, New York, U.S.

Playing career

Football
- 1921–1924: Wooster

Basketball
- c. 1922–1925: Wooster

Track and field
- c. 1923–1925: Wooster
- Positions: Guard, tackle (football); Guard, center (basketball)

Coaching career (HC unless noted)

Football
- 1925: Tufts (assistant)
- 1926–1929: Tufts (line)
- 1930–1945: Tufts

Basketball
- 1927–1934: Tufts

Head coaching record
- Overall: 60–48–12 (football); 60–41 (basketball)

Accomplishments and honors

Awards
- All-Ohio (1924, football); All-Ohio (1924–25, basketball)

Lewis Frederick Manly (April 23, 1903 – November 2, 1970) was an American athlete, sports coach and professor. He was best known for his time as head football coach at Tufts College (later Tufts University), a position he served in from 1930 to 1945.

From Erie, Pennsylvania, Manly attended the College of Wooster in Ohio, where he tried out for the football team as a freshman, despite having had no prior experience in interscholastic sports. He made the team as a sophomore and became one of their top players, helping them go undefeated in his junior year and being an All-Ohio selection as a senior. He also participated in basketball and track and field at Wooster.

Manly became a teacher and assistant football coach at Tufts in 1925. He became basketball coach in 1927, a position he served in through 1934, finishing with an overall record of 60–41. He added the role of head football coach in 1930. In 16 years as head football coach, he compiled a record of 60–48–12, including an undefeated 8–0 season in 1934, with his 60 wins making him the program's all-time leader. After retiring as football coach, he remained with the school as a professor and the chair of the economics department, until retiring in 1969.

== Early life and education ==
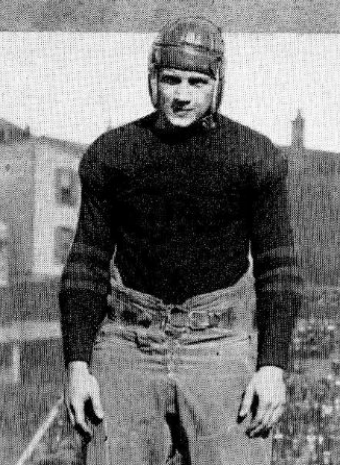
Manly in uniform while at Wooster

Lewis Frederick Manly was born on April 23, 1903, in Erie, Pennsylvania, to William Jared and Harriet (Miller) Manley. He grew up in Erie and attended Erie High School. After graduating from there, he enrolled at the College of Wooster in 1921 as an undergraduate. Despite having never played football or interscholastic sports before, he tried out for the football team. "I couldn't have been a very promising looking candidate because they didn't even give me a suit," Manly later recalled. "[At] a small college like that, equipment isn't any too plentiful so I went out to practice in an old pair of pants, a sweater, and some football shoes I managed to borrow. [Freshmen] were used for purposes of scrimmage against the varsity and for putting on enemy formations. I made the team [and] got some very valuable experience in line play that year."

Despite his inexperience, Manly went on to become "one of the star linemen of his time" and in Wooster history, later being inducted into their athletic hall of fame in 2005. He made the varsity team as a sophomore at guard and soon after became one of the "stars" of the Ohio Athletic Conference (OAC).

Standing at 5 ft 11 in tall, and weighing 185 pounds, Manly was switched to tackle as a junior and helped the team compile an undefeated 9–0 record, winning the OAC championship. The Kentucky Post and Times-Star named Manly and five others as the key players who led Wooster to the undefeated season. In the voting for the 1923 All-Ohio team, he earned first-team honors from one selector and second-team from three; on the final version of the team he was an honorable mention.

As a senior at Wooster, Manly was moved back to guard and played a key role in their historic upset 7–7 tie against the Ohio State Buckeyes, which remains the last time the Buckeyes ever failed to beat an in-state opponent. He was a 1924 All-Ohio selection and was described by a staff writer at The Akron Beacon Journal as "a thoroughly dependable lineman" and "one of the strongest defensive players on his team."

Manly also participated in basketball and track and field for Wooster, although he is best known for his play in football. He was elected team captain in basketball as a sophomore, the first time this had happened since 1917 for any Wooster varsity team. Playing guard, he was described by some as one of the fastest at his position in the state. He remained captain as a junior but was shifted to center. As a senior, he was named third-team All-Ohio.

Manly participated in the shot put events for the Wooster track and field team and at the time of his graduation, had received nine total varsity letters, the all-time record at the school.

== Coaching career and Tufts University ==
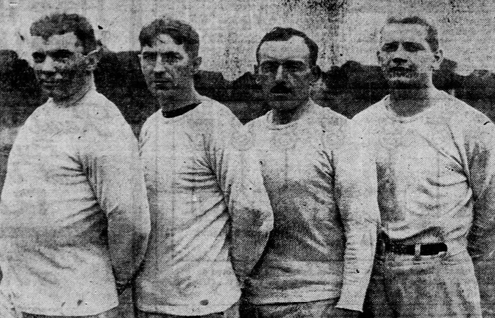
1925 Tufts Jumbos football coaching staff, featuring (from left to right): Louis McGoldrick, Eddie Casey, Bob Abbott and Manly

After graduating from the College of Wooster, Manly became a teaching fellow at Tufts College (later Tufts University) in late 1925. He also assisted Tufts Jumbos football coach Eddie Casey that year. Athletic director Clarence P. Houston liked Manly enough to name him line coach in 1926, assisting the new head coach Arthur Sampson. In his first year in the position, he developed what The Boston Globe described as "a strong forward wall, probably stronger than any Tufts has had for years. It is heavy, but has a fast, powerful charge."

While remaining football line coach, Manly was selected as head coach of the Tufts men's basketball team in 1927. He went on to serve in the position through 1934, having "turned out some fine teams," before resigning to focus on football. His overall record as basketball coach was 60–41.

In 1928, the Tufts line had no experienced players. The Boston Globe wrote that, "The task was one to cause anyone worry, yet Lew went right ahead, worked hard with the boys every afternoon, taught them the tricks of the lineman's trade, and produced one of the best, if the lightest, lines that ever represented the brown and blue." The following season, only three lineman returned, but Manly again built a stellar line and helped the Jumbos record their first-ever undefeated season, going 8–0. In all but one of their games, the Tufts line was outweighed, often by over 15-20 pounds per player, but despite this they "more than held their own against every team they met." Coach Arthur Sampson described Manly as "one of the finest line coaches in America today."

After Sampson left Tufts in 1930, Manly was named his successor as head coach, despite being only 26 years old. In his first season as head, Manly led the Jumbos to an overall record of 5–2. In the following three years, they compiled records of 3–2–2 (1931), 5–1–2 (1932), and 6–2 (1933). In 1934, Manly led Tufts to a perfect 8–0 record, and his team, the only unbeaten, untied team in the east, was named the eastern college football champion. Manly, modest and unwilling to accept any glory, gave all the credit to his players for the championship. Afterwards, the players put together their money and had a silver statue built in his honor. In an interview, Manly said that "I appreciate this more than anything else. I don't know why the boys did it, they need their money for other things. It is a wonderful tribute."

By this point in his coaching career, Manly had led the Jumbos to a 27–7–4 record in five seasons. A year after going undefeated, they declined to a 1–5–2 record, before going 3–3–1 the following year and 3–4–1 the year after that. The Jumbos would not have another winning season until 1941, when they went 5–3 under Manly. He had the largest squad in school history in 1943, and the Jumbos went 6–2; previously, due to lack of men, Manly would have to teach players three to four positions.

After a 4–1 record in 1945, Manly resigned and was succeeded by Frederick M. Ellis. He finished his 16–season stint at Tufts with an overall record of 60–48–12, which makes him the school's all-time winningest coach.

As Tufts coach, Manly emphasized "fun and preparation." His practices often included games of touch football, kicking contests, and foot races, but did not have tackling dummies or other equipment, with Manly focusing on training and conditioning methods. Harry Arlanson, one of his former players, described him as, "as much a scholar on the gridiron as he was in the classroom. He was extremely thorough. He approached the game in a very scholarly way. When we came out to play an opponent, we were prepared."

Manly received a Master of Arts degree from Tufts in 1927. He later worked on receiving a doctorate from Harvard University. He was a professor of economics at Tufts for many years and served for 25 years as chairman of the economics department. Manly retired from the Tufts faculty in 1969.

== Personal life and death ==
Manly was married to Susan, a long-time employee at Tufts, and had two children with her. He was a member of the Unitarian Church in Medford, Massachusetts. He died unexpectedly on November 2, 1970, while visiting one of his children in Plattsburgh, New York. Manly was 67 at the time of his death, and had retired from Tufts only a year earlier. The Lewis F. Manly Memorial Prize was named in his honor, given to the Tufts undergraduate who "combines a record of academic excellence with superior athletic performance."

== Head coaching record ==
=== Football ===
Year	Team	Overall	Conference	Standing	Bowl/playoffs
Tufts Jumbos (Independent) (1930–1945)
1930	Tufts	5–2			
1931	Tufts	3–2–2			
1932	Tufts	5–1–2			
1933	Tufts	6–2			
1934	Tufts	8–0			
1935	Tufts	1–5–2			
1936	Tufts	3–3–1			
1937	Tufts	3–4–1			
1938	Tufts	1–6–1			
1939	Tufts	3–4–1			
1940	Tufts	4–4			
1941	Tufts	5–3			
1942	Tufts	2–5–1			
1943	Tufts	6–2			
1944	Tufts	1–4–1			
1945	Tufts	4–1			
Tufts:		60–48–12			
Total:		60–48–12			
