= Dan Jessee =

American baseball player (1901–1970)

Biographical details
- Born: February 22, 1901; Olive Hill, Kentucky, U.S.
- Died: April 30, 1970 (aged 69); Venice, Florida, U.S.

Playing career

Football
- c. 1920: Pacific (OR)

Basketball
- c. 1920: Pacific (OR)

Baseball
- c. 1920: Pacific (OR)
- 1926: Seattle Indians
- 1927: Salt Lake City Bees
- 1929: Jersey City Skeeters
- 1929: Cleveland Indians
- 1929–1930: Decatur Commodores
- 1930: Bloomington Cubs
- Positions: Shortstop, third baseman (baseball)

Coaching career (HC unless noted)

Football
- 1932–1966: Trinity (CT)

Baseball
- 1935–1961: Trinity (CT)
- 1963–1967: Trinity (CT)

Head coaching record
- Overall: 150–76–7 (football); 239–170–5 (baseball)

Accomplishments and honors

Awards
- AFCA NCAA College Division Coach of the Year Award (1966)

Daniel Edward Jessee (February 22, 1901 – April 30, 1970) was an American professional baseball player and coach of college football and college baseball. He appeared in one Major League Baseball game as a pinch runner for the Cleveland Indians on August 14 during the 1929 Cleveland Indians season. Jessee served as the head football coach at Trinity College in Hartford, Connecticut from 1932 to 1966, compiling a record of 150–76–7. He also had two stints as Trinity's head baseball coach, from 1935 to 1961 and 1963, to 1967, tallying a mark of 239–170–5. Jessee/Miller Field, the home stadium of the Trinity Bantams football team, was named for Jessee in 1966 and now also honors his successor as head football coach, Don Miller.

Jessee attended Pacific University in Forest Grove, Oregon, where he played football, basketball, and baseball. He earned a master's degree in physical education from Columbia University in 1932. Jessee died on April 30, 1970, in Venice, Florida.

== Head coaching record ==
=== Football ===
Year	Team	Overall	Conference	Standing	Bowl/playoffs
Trinity Hilltoppers/Bantams (Independent) (1932–1966)
1932	Trinity	2–4			
1933	Trinity	4–2			
1934	Trinity	7–0			
1935	Trinity	6–1			
1936	Trinity	6–1			
1937	Trinity	4–3			
1938	Trinity	2–3–1			
1939	Trinity	4–2–1			
1940	Trinity	5–2			
1941	Trinity	6–1			
1942	Trinity	1–5–1			
1943	No team—World War II				
1944	No team—World War II				
1945	No team—World War II				
1946	Trinity	4–2			
1947	Trinity	6–1			
1948	Trinity	5–2			
1949	Trinity	8–0			
1950	Trinity	7–1			
1951	Trinity	6–2			
1952	Trinity	6–2			
1953	Trinity	5–3			
1954	Trinity	7–0			
1955	Trinity	7–0			
1950	Trinity	5–2			
1957	Trinity	1–5			
1958	Trinity	4–4			
1959	Trinity	6–1–1			
1960	Trinity	3–4–1			
1961	Trinity	5–2–1			
1962	Trinity	4–3–1			
1963	Trinity	3–5			
1964	Trinity	1–7			
1965	Trinity	4–4			
1966	Trinity	6–2			
Trinity:		150–76–7			
Total:		150–76–7			
