= Frederick M. Ellis =

American sportsman (1906–1967)

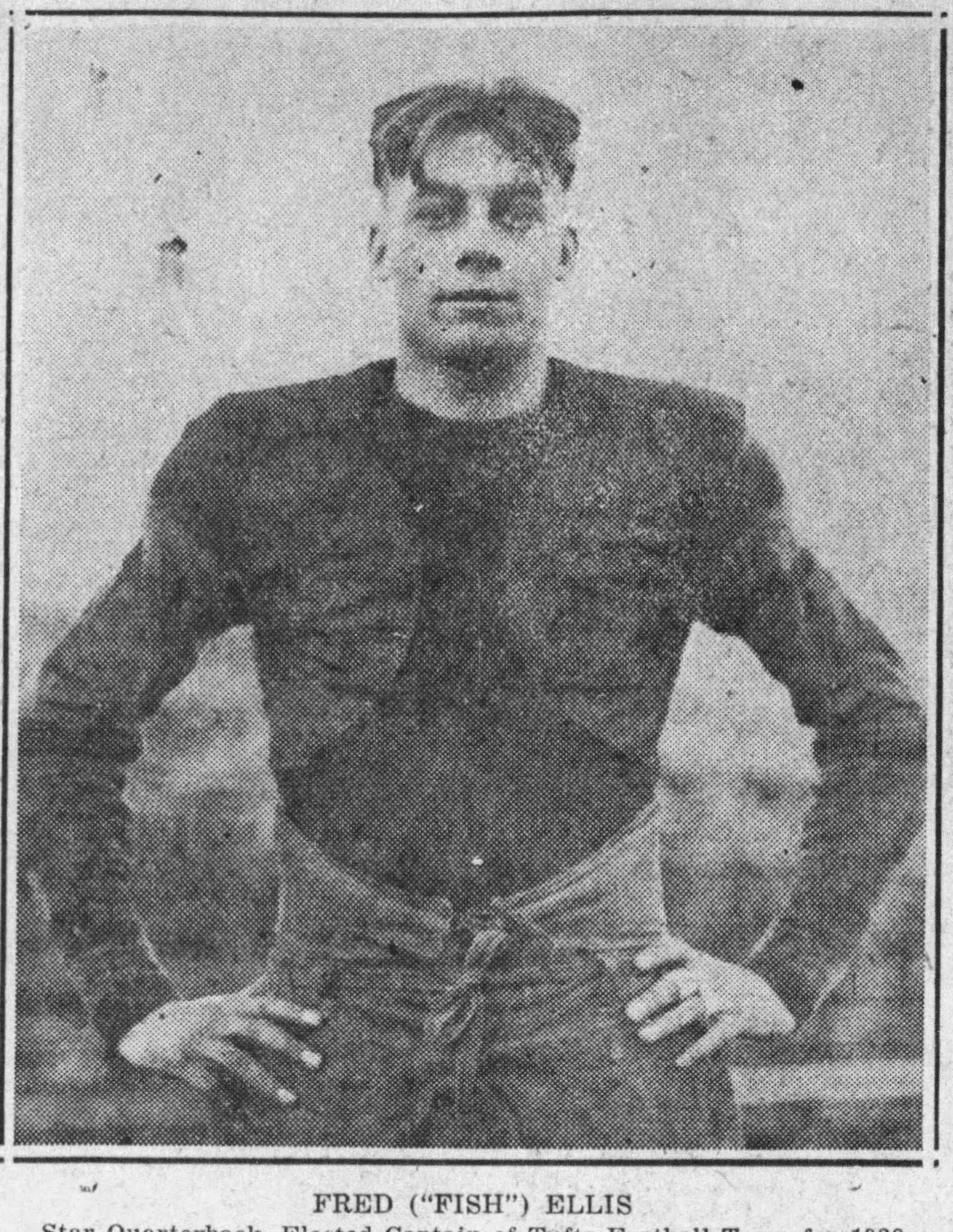
- Ellis, 1927

Biographical details
- Born: February 26, 1906; Norwood, Massachusetts, U.S.
- Died: July 19, 1967 (aged 61); Burlington, Massachusetts, U.S.

Playing career

Football
- 1926–1928: Tufts
- Position: Quarterback

Coaching career (HC unless noted)

Football
- 1929–1933: Bridgton Academy
- 1934–1937: Beverly HS (MA) (backfield)
- 1937–1939: Tufts (backfield)
- 1940–1944: Dean Academy
- 1946–1953: Tufts

Basketball
- 1929–1934: Bridgton Academy
- 1940–1943: Dean Academy
- 1946–1953: Tufts

Baseball
- 1929–1934: Bridgton Academy

Head coaching record
- Overall: 25–34–6 (football); 74–75 (basketball)

Accomplishments and honors

Championships
- Maine prep school football championship (1929)

Frederick Melvin "Fish" Ellis (February 26, 1906 – July 19, 1967) was an American sportsman who played football, basketball, baseball, and track at Tufts University. He was also an athletics coach, administrator, and university professor at Tufts. Ellis is the namesake of Tufts' home football field, the Ellis Oval. He is regarded by many as one of the greatest athletes in Tufts history.

== Early life and playing career ==
Ellis was born in 1906 in Norwood, Massachusetts. His family moved to Gloucester and he attended Gloucester High School for two years. He then moved to Medford, where he was the starting quarterback for the Medford High School football team, was the anchor on the MHS relay team, and competed in the high jump and dash race for the track team.

Ellis graduated from MHS in 1925 and entered Tufts University that fall, majoring in civil engineering. Ellis lettered in four sports – football, basketball, baseball, and track – at Tufts, from which he graduated in 1929. He was the first Tufts student to earn varsity letters in four sports.

Ellis is best remembered for his time playing football. He played quarterback for the Tufts football team from 1926 to 1928, scoring a school-record 181 points. That record stood until 2016, when Shayne "Chance" Brady finished his Tufts career with 210 points. Ellis led the 1927 squad to an undefeated season, with the Jumbos posting a perfect 8–0 record.

In the summers of 1928 and 1929, he played for Orleans in the Cape Cod Baseball League. In 1930, he played for a professional basketball team in Auburn, Maine.

Ellis' future wife, Dorothea Loughlin, attended Jackson College – the women's college associated with Tufts – from 1927 to 1931 and played on the Jackson baseball team.

== Later life ==
In 1929, Ellis became the football, basketball, and baseball coach at the Bridgton Academy. He also taught algebra and history. One of his athletes, Johnny Grinnell, followed in Ellis' footsteps at Tufts and became the first Tufts alumnus inducted into the College Football Hall of Fame. In his first year at the school, Bridgton's football team defeated Hebron Academy 27–7 to win the state championship. They won the western conference title the following season, but no championship game was held. They returned to the title game in 1931, but lost to Kents Hill School 20–6.

In 1934, Ellis became an assistant football coach at Beverly High School. In 1938, he returned to Tufts as backfield coach. Two years later, he became the football and basketball coach at the Dean Academy. From 1940 to 1942, his football team won 17 consecutive games. During World War II, Ellis served in the Pacific Theater with the United States Army.

In 1946, Ellis was discharged from the Army and returned to Tufts to succeed the retiring Lewis Manly as head football coach. He coached the Jumbos from 1946 to 1953, compiling a record of 25–34–6. He was also the head basketball coach from 1946 to 1953, tallying a mark of 74–75. In 1954, Ellis became a full professor and the chairman of Tufts' Department of Physical Education.

== Death and honors ==
Ellis died of a heart attack at the age of 61 on July 19, 1967, at his home in Burlington, Massachusetts. He was survived by Dorothea and their two daughters, Faith and Susan, both of whom graduated from Tufts (as did their husbands). Dorothea died on October 14, 2011.

The football field at Tufts University was named in his honor as Frederick M. Ellis Oval at homecoming in 1969. The Frederick M. Ellis Prize Scholarship at Tufts is named in his memory. On April 21, 2018, Ellis was a member of the inaugural class inducted into the Tufts University Athletics Hall of Fame.

== Head coaching record ==
=== Football ===
Year	Team	Overall	Conference	Standing	Bowl/playoffs
Tufts Jumbos (Independent) (1946–1953)
1946	Tufts	1–6			
1947	Tufts	5–2			
1948	Tufts	3–4–1			
1949	Tufts	5–3–1			
1950	Tufts	4–4–1			
1951	Tufts	0–7–2			
1952	Tufts	3–4–1			
1953	Tufts	4–3			
Tufts:		25–34–6			
Total:		25–34–6			
