= Jeff Devanney =

American college football coach

Current position
- Title: Head coach
- Team: Trinity (CT)
- Conference: NESCAC
- Record: 135–25

Playing career
- 1992: Trinity (CT)

Coaching career (HC unless noted)
- 1993: Coast Guard (WR)
- 1994–1995: Albany (GA)
- 1996–1997: Georgia Tech (GA)
- 1998–2000: Central Connecticut (DC)
- 2001: Trinity (CT) (DL/ST)
- 2002–2004: Trinity (CT) (DB/ST)
- 2005: Trinity (CT) (DC/DB)
- 2006–present: Trinity (CT)

Head coaching record
- Overall: 135–25

Accomplishments and honors

Championships
- 8 NESCAC (2008, 2012, 2016–2018, 2022, 2023, 2025)

Jeff Devanney is an American college football coach. He is the head football coach for Trinity College, a position he has held since 2006. Devanney was previously the defensive coordinator for Trinity under Chuck Priore before succeeding Priore as head coach following the 2005 season.

== Head coaching record ==
Year	Team	Overall	Conference	Standing	Bowl/playoffs
Trinity Bantams (New England Small College Athletic Conference) (2006–present)
2006	Trinity	7–1	7–1	2nd	
2007	Trinity	6–2	6–2	T–2nd	
2008	Trinity	8–0	8–0	1st	
2009	Trinity	6–2	6–2	T–2nd	
2010	Trinity	7–1	7–1	2nd	
2011	Trinity	7–1	7–1	2nd	
2012	Trinity	8–0	8–0	1st	
2013	Trinity	6–2	6–2	4th	
2014	Trinity	5–3	5–3	4th	
2015	Trinity	7–1	7–1	2nd	
2016	Trinity	8–0	8–0	1st	
2017	Trinity	8–1	8–1	1st	
2018	Trinity	8–1	8–1	1st	
2019	Trinity	5–4	5–4	4th	
2020–21	No team—COVID-19				
2021	Trinity	8–1	8–1	2nd	
2022	Trinity	9–0	9–0	1st	
2023	Trinity	8–1	8–1	T–1st	
2024	Trinity	7–2	7–2	T–2nd	
2025	Trinity	7–2	7–2	T–1st	
2026	Trinity	0–0	0–0		
Trinity:		135–25	135–25		
Total:		135–25			
National championship Conference title Conference division title or championship game berth

== See also ==
- List of college football career coaching winning percentage leaders
