= Luman (name) =

Luman is both a surname and a given name. Notable people with the name include:

== Given name ==
- Luman Aldrich (1852–1916), American football player and coach
- Luman L. Cadwell (1836–1925), American Civil War lieutenant awarded the Medal of Honor
- Luman Reed (1787–1836), American merchant and an important patron of the arts
- Luman Walters (c. 1789–1860), known for his connection with the family of Joseph Smith, Jr., the founder of the Latter-Day Saint movement
- Luman Watson (1790–1834), American clockmaker
- Luman Hamlin Weller (1833–1914), United States Greenback Party member

== Surname ==
- Bob Luman (1937–1978), American country and rockabilly singer
- Richard Luman (1900–1973), American football and basketball player

== Fictionals ==
- Luman, a character from The Haunted House animated series
