= Luman Aldrich =

American football player and coach (1852–1916)

Biographical details
- Born: September , 1852
- Died: October 6, 1916 (aged 64)
- Education: Tufts (AB); Boston Univ.

Playing career
- 1875–1877: Tufts

Coaching career (HC unless noted)
- 1875–1877: Tufts

Head coaching record
- Overall: 3–1–1

Luman W. Aldrich (September 1852 – October 16, 1916) was an American college football player and coach. He served as a player-coach at Tufts University in Boston, Massachusetts from 1875 to 1877, compiling a record of 3–1–1. He attended the Boston University School of Law.
