= 2003 Trinity Bantams football team =

American college football season

2003 Trinity Bantams football

NESCAC champion
- Conference: New England Small College Athletic Conference
- Record: 8–0 (8–0 NESCAC)
- Head coach: Chuck Priore (4th season)
- Captains: Jared Carillo; Matth Glasz; Greg Tanner; Joe Wahl
- Home stadium: Jessee/Miller Field

2003 New England Small College Athletic Conference football standings
	Conf.			Overall
Team	W		L	W		L
Trinity (CT) $	8	–	0	8	–	0
Williams	6	–	2	6	–	2
Colby	5	–	3	5	–	3
Tufts	5	–	3	5	–	3
Amherst	4	–	4	4	–	4
Middlebury	4	–	4	4	–	4
Wesleyan	4	–	4	4	–	4
Bates	2	–	6	2	–	6
Hamilton	2	–	6	2	–	6
Bowdoin	0	–	8	0	–	8
$ – Conference champion

The 2003 Trinity Bantams football team was an American football team that represented Trinity College of Hartford, Connecticut as a member of the New England Small College Athletic Conference (NESCAC) during the 2003 NCAA Division III football season. In their fifth season under head coach Chuck Priore, the Bantams compiled a perfect 8–0 record and won the NESCAC championship. Trinity's defense allowed only 3.8 points per game, setting a new NESCAC record for scoring defense.

The 2003 season was Trinity's second consecutive NESCAC championship and part of a 31-game winning streak that began on October 5, 2002, ended on September 30, 2006, and included perfect seasons in 2003, 2004, and 2005.

The team played its home games at Jessee/Miller Field in Hartford.

== Schedule ==
Date	Opponent	Site	Result	Attendance	Source
September 20	at Colby	Waterville, ME	W 30–6		
September 27	Williams	Jessee/Miller Field; Hartford, CT	W 10–0	6,848	
October 4	Hamilton	Jessee/Miller Field; Hartford, CT	W 45–7		
October 11	at Tufts	Medford, MA	W 23–3		
October 18	Bowdoin	Jessee/Miller Field; Hartford, CT	W 51–0		
October 25	at Middlebury	Middlebury, VT	W 16–0		
November 1	at Amherst	Amherst, MA	W 20–14		
November 8	Wesleyan	Jessee/Miller Field; Hartford, CT (rivalry)	W 53–0		
