= 2004 Trinity Bantams football team =

American college football season

2004 Trinity Bantams football

NESCAC champion
- Conference: New England Small College Athletic Conference
- Record: 8–0 (8–0 NESCAC)
- Head coach: Chuck Priore (5th season)
- Offensive coordinator: Jeff Behrman (1st season)
- Captains: Christian MacNamara; Matt Schiffman; Duane Tyler
- Home stadium: Jessee/Miller Field

2004 New England Small College Athletic Conference football standings
	Conf.			Overall
Team	W		L	W		L
Trinity (CT) $	8	–	0	8	–	0
Amherst	6	–	2	6	–	2
Colby	6	–	2	6	–	2
Williams	6	–	2	6	–	2
Middlebury	4	–	4	4	–	4
Wesleyan	3	–	5	3	–	5
Bates	2	–	6	2	–	6
Bowdoin	2	–	6	2	–	6
Tufts	2	–	6	2	–	6
Hamilton	1	–	7	1	–	7
$ – Conference champion

The 2004 Trinity Bantams football team was an American football team that represented Trinity College of Hartford, Connecticut as a member of the New England Small College Athletic Conference (NESCAC) during the 2004 NCAA Division III football season. In their fifth season under head coach Chuck Priore, the Bantams compiled a perfect 8–0 record, won the NESCAC championship, and outscored opponents by a total of 310 to 52.

By the end of the 2004 season, Trinity had won 22 consecutive games, the longest winning streak among all NCAA divisions. The streak eventually extended to 31 games, ending on September 30, 2006. The streak included three straight perfect seasons in 2003, 2004, and 2005.

The team played its home games at Jessee/Miller Field in Hartford.

== Schedule ==
Date	Opponent	Site	Result	Attendance	Source
September 25	Bates	Jessee/Miller Field; Hartford, CT	W 49–0	3,214	
October 2	at Williams	Williamstown, MA	W 30–12		
October 9	at Hamilton	Clinton, NY	W 55–6		
October 16	Tufts	Jessee/Miller Field; Hartford, CT	W 36–14		
October 23	at Bowdoin	Brunswick, ME	W 41–0		
October 30	Middlebury	Jessee/Miller Field; Hartford, CT	W 28–7		
November 6	Amherst^{†}	Jessee/Miller Field; Hartford, CT	W 31–7	5,821	
November 13	at Wesleyan	Andrus Field; Middletown, CT (rivalry)	W 40–6	1,800	
^{†}Homecoming
