= Chuck Priore =

Former Stony Brook football head coach

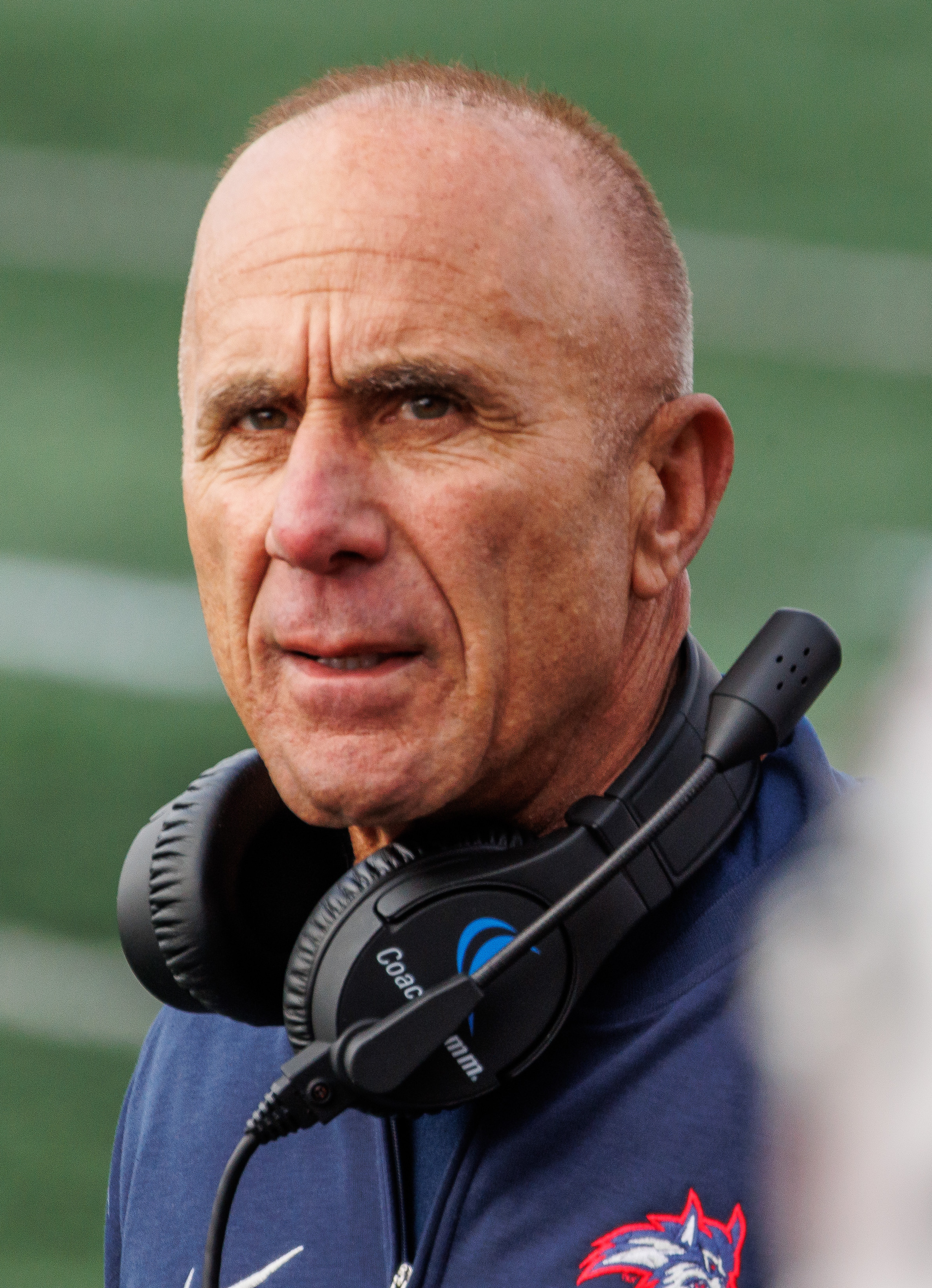
- Priore in 2023

Biographical details
- Born: February 17, 1960 (age 66); Long Island, New York, U.S.

Playing career

Football
- 1979–1982: Albany
- Position: Fullback

Coaching career (HC unless noted)

Football
- 1983–1986: Albany (RB)
- 1987–1991: Union (NY) (OC)
- 1992–1999: Penn (OC)
- 2000–2005: Trinity (CT)
- 2006–2023: Stony Brook

Lacrosse
- 1986: Albany
- 1988–1991: Union (NY)

Head coaching record
- Overall: 136–110 (football); 38–29 (lacrosse)

Accomplishments and honors

Championships
- 4 NESCAC (2002–2005); 3 Big South (2009–2011)

Awards
- 3× NESCAC Coach of the Year (2003–2005); 2× Big South Coach of the Year (2009, 2011)

Charles Priore (born February 17, 1960) is an American former college football and college lacrosse coach. He was the head coach of the Stony Brook Seawolves for 18 years, from 2006 to 2023. He led Stony Brook to shares of four consecutive Big South Conference titles from 2009 to 2012. Priore coached Stony Brook to its first four FCS playoff appearances. After five consecutive losing seasons, culminating in a program-worst 0–10 winless 2023, Priore was fired. He was 97–101 with the Seawolves.

Priore served the head football coach at Trinity College in Hartford, Connecticut from 2000 to 2005. He was also the head men's lacrosse coach at the University at Albany in 1986 and at Union College in Schenectady, New York from 1988 to 1991.

Priore's coaching style is known for his run-heavy offense and aggressive defense.

== Playing career ==
Priore played football at the University at Albany before graduating in 1982. He was the starting fullback for three seasons and was named team captain before his senior year. In 1982, he won the Spud Kruzan Award, given to Albany's most outstanding athlete.

== Coaching career ==
After the end of his playing career, Priore was the running backs and strength coach at Albany from 1983 to 1986. In 1986, he was also Albany's head lacrosse coach. Priore was the offensive coordinator, strength coach and head lacrosse coach at Union College from 1987 to 1991.

Priore was Penn's offensive coordinator from 1992 to 1999.

=== Trinity ===
Priore was head coach for six seasons at Trinity College where he led the Bantams to a 39–9 record including four consecutive New England Small College Athletic Conference (NESCAC) titles.

=== Stony Brook ===
Priore was named the second head football coach at Stony Brook University on December 10, 2005. In his first season, he led the Seawolves to a 5–6 record in their final season in the Northeast Conference. After plans were announced to move to the Big South Conference starting in 2008, Priore coached his team to a 6–5 record as an independent in 2007. From 2009 to 2012, he led the Seawolves to four consecutive Big South Championships, and in 2011 led the Seawolves to their first NCAA Division I Football Championship bid, advancing to the second round for the first time ever.

In January 2008, Priore's contract was extended through the 2012 season. After the 2009 season, Priore was given a one-year extension through 2013. In January 2011, Priore's contract was extended through 2016. In January 2013, after making the FCS playoffs for the first two times, Priore's contract was extended one year again through 2017. In 2016, Priore's contract was extended through 2020, but this was not made public until 2018. In 2018, following two consecutive FCS Playoffs appearances, Priore's contract was extended through 2022.

On November 17, 2022, Stony Brook announced that Priore's contract was extended through 2025, after a program-worst 2–9 season. However, an investigative report by The Statesman revealed that Priore and Stony Brook AD Shawn Heilbron agreed to the extension before the season started, but it was never publicized by anyone in the school.

After an 0–10 season in 2023, the first winless season in Stony Brook history, Priore was fired two days after the team's last game, on November 13. Priore finished 97–101 over 18 years as Stony Brook's head coach.

== Personal life ==
Priore's younger brother, Ray Priore, is the head football coach at the University of Pennsylvania.

== Head coaching record ==
=== Football ===
Year	Team	Overall	Conference	Standing	Bowl/playoffs	TSN/STATS^{#}	FCS Coaches^{°}
Trinity Bantams (New England Small College Athletic Conference) (2000–2005)
2000	Trinity	4–4	4–4	6th			
2001	Trinity	4–4	4–4	T–4th			
2002	Trinity	7–1	7–1	T–1st			
2003	Trinity	8–0	8–0	1st			
2004	Trinity	8–0	8–0	1st			
2005	Trinity	8–0	8–0	1st			
Trinity:		39–9	39–9				
Stony Brook Seawolves (Northeast Conference) (2006)
2006	Stony Brook	5–6	5–2	2nd			
Stony Brook Seawolves (NCAA Division I FCS independent) (2007)
2007	Stony Brook	6–5					
Stony Brook Seawolves (Big South Conference) (2008–2012)
2008	Stony Brook	5–6	3–2	2nd			
2009	Stony Brook	6–5	5–1	T–1st			
2010	Stony Brook	6–5	5–1	T–1st			
2011	Stony Brook	9–4	6–0	1st	L NCAA Division I Second Round	18	16
2012	Stony Brook	10–3	5–1	T–1st	L NCAA Division I Second Round	10	13
Stony Brook Seawolves (Colonial/Coastal Athletic Association) (2013–2023)
2013	Stony Brook	5–6	3–5	T–8th			
2014	Stony Brook	5–7	4–4	T–5th			
2015	Stony Brook	5–5	3–5	T–7th			
2016	Stony Brook	5–6	4–4	T–6th			
2017	Stony Brook	10–3	7–1	2nd	L NCAA Division I Second Round	10	11
2018	Stony Brook	7–5	5–3	T–3rd	L NCAA Division I First Round	16	18
2019	Stony Brook	5–7	2–6	11th			
2020–21	Stony Brook	1–3	1–3	T–5th (North)			
2021	Stony Brook	5–6	4–4	T–4th			
2022	Stony Brook	2–9	1–7	T–12th			
2023	Stony Brook	0–10	0–8	15th			
Stony Brook:		97–101	63–57				
Total:		136–110					
National championship Conference title Conference division title or championship game berth
