= Don Miller (American football coach) =

American football player and coach

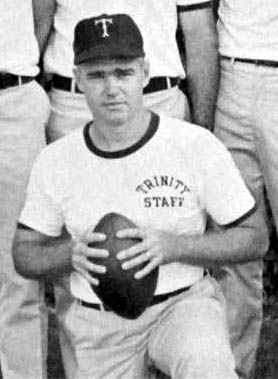
- Miller as head coach of Trinity, 1967

Biographical details
- Born: c. 1933

Playing career

Football
- 1951–1954: Delaware
- Position: Quarterback

Coaching career (HC unless noted)

Football
- 1955–1958: Newark HS (DE)
- 1959–1964: Amherst (line)
- 1965–1966: Trinity (CT) (line)
- 1967–1998: Trinity (CT)

Softball
- 1983–1991: Trinity (CT)

Head coaching record
- Overall: 174–77–5 (college football); 72–36 (college softball); 31–2 (high school football)

Donald G. Miller (born c. 1933) is a retired American football coach and former player. He served as the head football coach at Trinity College in Hartford, Connecticut from 1967 to 1998. Miller played college football at the University of Delaware, where he was the starting quarterback who led the Blue Hens to victory in the 1954 Refrigerator Bowl.

Miller began his coaching career at Newark High School in Newark, Delaware in 1955. He led Newark to a record of 31–2 in four seasons as head coach before he resigned in April 1959 to take an assistant coaching position at Amherst College in Amherst, Massachusetts.

Jessee/Miller Field, the home stadium of the Trinity Bantams football team is named for Miller and his predecessor, Dan Jessee.
