= Frank Hauser (American football) =

American football player and coach (born 1957)

Current position
- Title: Quarterbacks coach
- Team: Tufts
- Conference: NESCAC

Biographical details
- Born: October 18, 1957 (age 69)

Playing career
- 1975–1978: Wesleyan
- Position: Linebacker

Coaching career (HC unless noted)
- 1986–1991: Wesleyan (DC)
- 1992–2009: Wesleyan
- 2010: Hartford Colonials (LB)
- 2011–2023: Tufts (OC/QB)
- 2024–present: Tufts (QB)

Head coaching record
- Overall: 68–76 (college)

Frank Hauser (born October 18, 1957) is an American football coach and former player. He played at Wesleyan University and served as the school's head football coach for 18 years, from 1992 to 2009. With 68 wins in 18 years as Wesleyan's head coach, he is the second-winningest football coach in Wesleyan history.

== Athletic career ==
Hauser attended Wesleyan University in Middletown, Connecticut from 1975 to 1979. He played linebacker for Wesleyan's football team and was also a member of Wesleyan's wrestling team for four years. He graduated from Wesleyan in 1979 and subsequently received an M.A. from the university.

== Early coaching career ==
After graduating from Wesleyan, Hauser began his career in coaching and education at Middletown High School as a mathematics teacher and an assistant coach in several sports. He later became the head football coach at Glastonbury High School and led the team to an 11–0 record and the Class LL Connecticut state championship in 1984.

== Wesleyan ==
In 1986, Hauser returned to his alma mater as an assistant coach for the Wesleyan football team. He was the team's defensive coordinator starting in 1986 and became the head football coach in 1992. He was also an assistant men's basketball coach at Wesleyan from 1988 to 1992. In 18 years as Wesleyan's head coach, Hauser compiled a career record of 68–76, making him the second winningest football coach in the school's 120-year football history (trailing only Norm Daniels with 76 wins). His best season at Wesleyan was 1997 when the football team finished with a 7–1 and a three-way tie for the Little Three championship. He also led the team to 6–2 records in 1993 and 1998. He put together a record of 54–42 in his first 12 years as Wesleyan's head coach, but he failed to post a winning record for six straight years from 2004 through 2009. In those years, the team compiled a record of 14–34, including an 0–8 season in 2005 and a 1–7 season in 2008. In December 2009, Hauser was fired from his position as Wesleyan's head coach. Hauser's former assistant coach, John Skubel, said at the time, "I thought he was a brilliant coach who was great with the kids. A long time ago he volunteered to tutor kids in math there and he's an alumnus of Wesleyan. I have no idea what their reasons are, but all I know is that he's a great coach." Hauser retained his position as an adjunct professor of physical education at Wesleyan.

== Hartford Colonials ==
In May 2010, Hauser was hired as the linebackers coach for the Hartford Colonials of the United Football League. Interviewed about his new position, Hauser said, "I like what I'm doing and that it's at a pretty high level. It's real good so far and the nice thing is its professional football, all football all the time. There's no recruiting or any of the other things that come with college football."
