= Youngman Field at Alumni Stadium =

Multi-use stadium in Middlebury, Vermont

Coordinates: 44°0′6.10″N 73°10′37.09″W

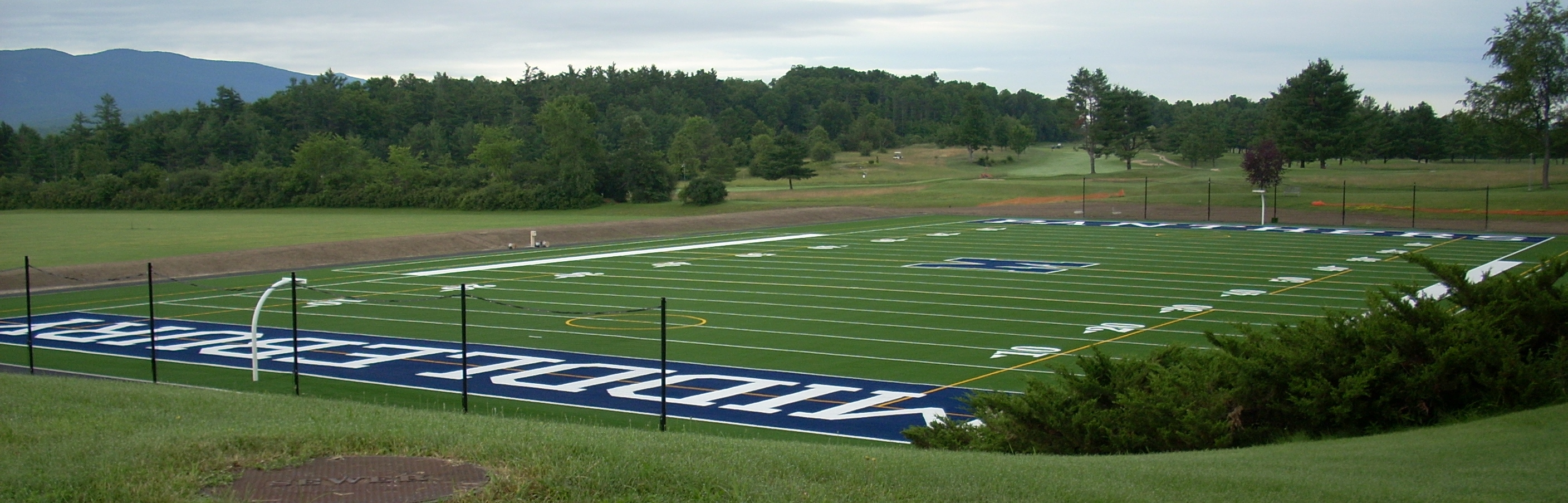
- The stadium in 2008
- Interactive map of Youngman Field at Alumni Stadium
- Full name: Youngman Field at Alumni Stadium
- Address: Middlebury, Vermont; United States
- Owner: Middlebury College
- Capacity: 3,500
- Type: Stadium
- Surface: FieldTurf
- Current use: Football

Construction
- Opened: 1991; 35 years ago

Tenant
- Middlebury College Panthers football

Website
- athletics.middlebury.edu/alumni-stadium

Youngman Field at Alumni Stadium is a 3,500-capacity multi-use stadium in Middlebury, Vermont on the campus of the NCAA Division III-affiliated Middlebury College. Opened in 1991, it serves as home to the school's football and lacrosse teams.

== Seven-year lacrosse home winning streak ==
Youngman Field was host to a 45-game winning streak by the Middlebury men's lacrosse team that began in April 1997 and ran until the NCAA Division III Semi-finals in March 2004.
