= Tufts Jumbos football =

Football program representing Tufts University

- First season: 1874; 152 years ago
- Athletic director: Ryan Pisarri
- Head coach: Jay Civetti; 14th season, 56–55 (.505)
- Location: Somerville, Massachusetts
- Stadium: Ellis Oval (capacity: 4,000)
- Field: Zimman Field
- NCAA division: Division III
- Conference: NESCAC
- Colors: Tufts blue and brown
- Website: gotuftsjumbos.com

The Tufts Jumbos football program represents Tufts University in the sport of college football. The team competes in Division III of the National Collegiate Athletic Association (NCAA) as a member of the New England Small College Athletic Conference (NESCAC). Tufts plays its home games at Ellis Oval, located on the campus within the municipality of Somerville, Massachusetts. The team's head coach is Jay Civetti, who has led the Jumbos since 2011.

== History ==
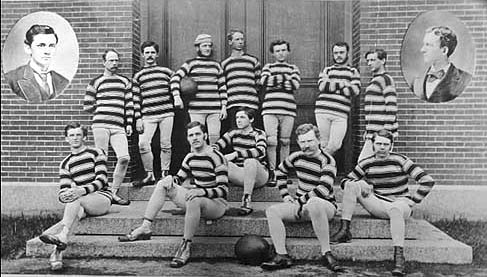
1875 Tufts football team

A Tufts football team has played since the 1874–75 season. The Tufts football team played its first game on June 4, 1875, against Harvard, which Tufts won by a score of 1–0. This game is considered the first game of American football between two American colleges, with each team fielding 11 men, the ball being advanced by kicking or carrying it, and tackles of the ball carrier stopping play. During the 1875–76 season, Tufts played Bates on the Bates campus in Lewiston, Maine, for the first organized intercollegiate football game played in Maine.

In one of the largest shutout wins in team history, Tufts defeated the 1914 New Hampshire football team by a score of 83–0.

One Tufts player, William Grinnell (1909–1997), a varsity member during the 1930s, has been inducted into the College Football Hall of Fame.

The 1,000th game in team history was played during the 2006 season.

=== Seasons ===
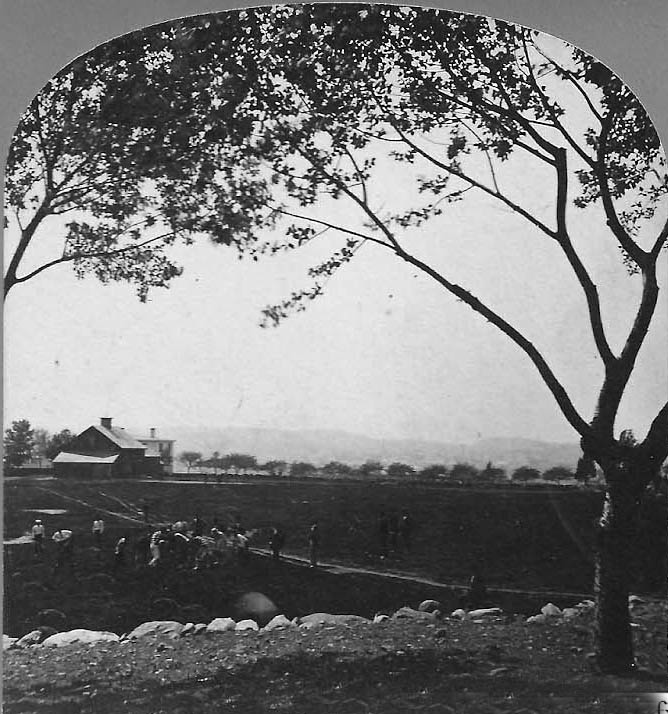
Tufts vs. Harvard at College Hill, October 1875

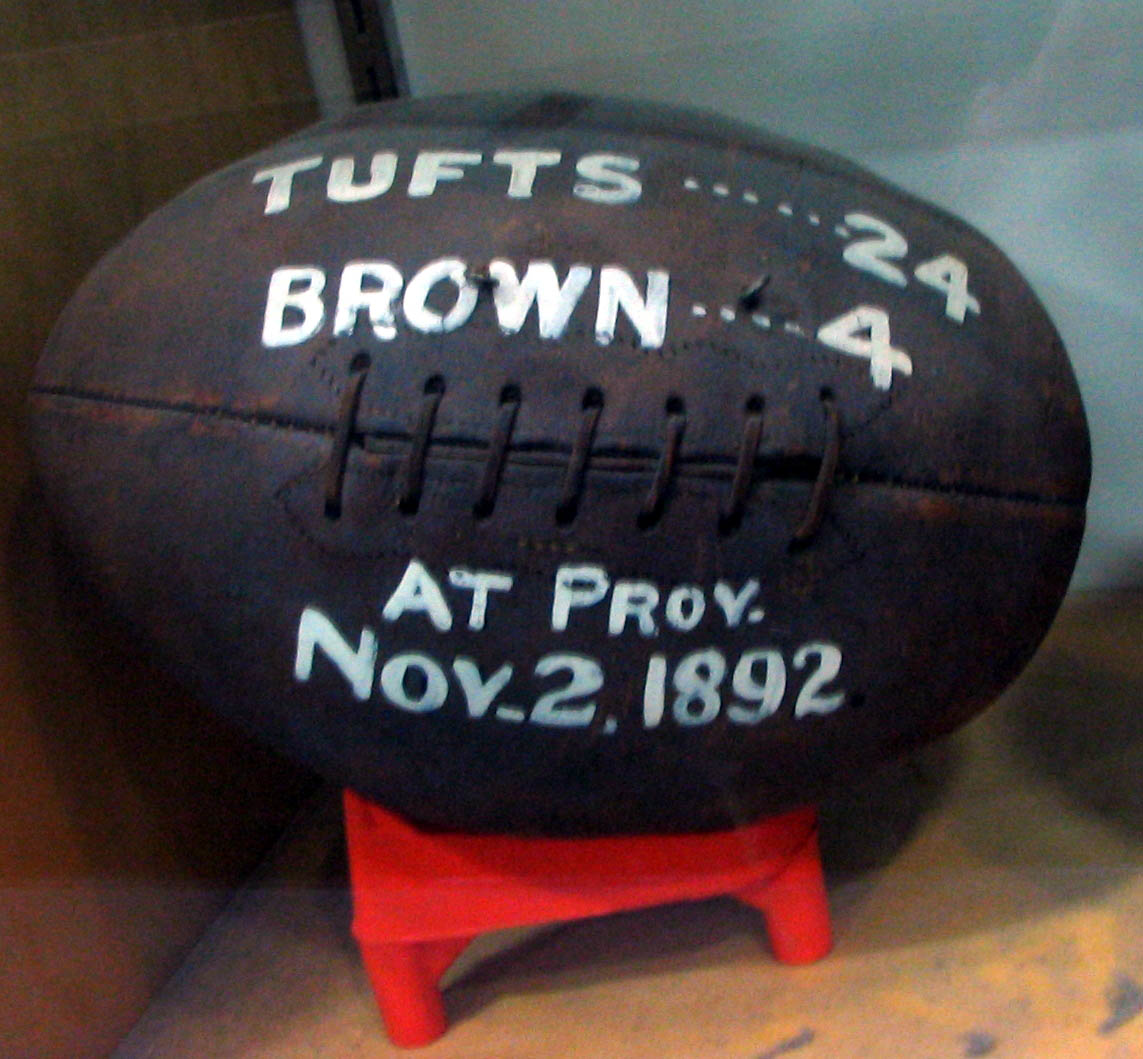
Original ball from the Tufts–Brown game played in November 1892

Season	Head coach	Conference	Finished	Wins	Losses	Ties
1875	Luman Aldrich	Independent	—	2	1	0
1876–77	Luman Aldrich	Independent	—	1	0	1
1877	Scott Campbell	Independent	—	0	3	0
1884	Dwight Griswold	Independent	—	2	4	1
1885	Fred P. Chapman	NIFA	2nd	2	3 (Note: Alternative sources indicate a 2–4 record for the 1885 season.)	0
1886	James Galletly	NIFA	2nd	0	8	0
1887	Frank W. Durkee	Independent	—	4	6	0
1889	Martin	Independent	—	3	1	0
1890	Charles Stover	Independent	—	2	3	0
1891	Wilfred Russ	Independent	—	7	1	0
1892	A. G. Baillet	Independent	—	8	2	0
1893	Haskell	Independent	—	4	7	0
1894	H. W. Hamlin	Independent	—	6	5	0
1895	Marshall Newell	Independent	—	8	5	0
1896	Marshall Newell	Independent	—	2	6	1
1897	Joshua Damon Upton	Independent	—	6	7	0
1898	Joshua Damon Upton	Independent	—	1	9	0
1899	E. A. Locke	Independent	—	7	4	0
1900	Hopkins	Independent	—	3	6	1
1901	J. C. Pearson	Independent	—	6	6	1
1902	J. C. Pearson	Independent	—	4	6	1
1903	Charles Whelan	Independent	—	5	8	0
1904	Charles Whelan	Independent	—	2	9	1
1905	Charles Whelan	Independent	—	5	3	0
1906	Charles Whelan	Independent	—	6	2	0
1907	Charles Whelan	Independent	—	3	4	1
1908	Nate Pulsifer	Independent	—	1	6	1
1909	Edward N. Robinson	Independent	—	2	6	0
1910	Vin H. Sheehy	Independent	—	1	7	1
1911	Clark Tobin	Independent	—	3	4	0
1912	Charles Whelan	Independent	—	5	4	0
1913	Charles Whelan	Independent	—	7	1	0
1914	Charles Whelan	Independent	—	5	3	0
1915	Charles Whelan	Independent	—	5	1	2
1916	Charles Whelan	Independent	—	5	3	0
1917	Charles Whelan	Independent	—	3	3	0
1918	Al Pierotti	Independent	—	2	3	0
1919	Charles Whelan	Independent	—	2	5	0
1920	William Parks	Independent	—	2	6	0
1921	William Parks	Independent	—	1	5	2
1922	Eddie Casey	Independent	—	5	4	0
1923	Eddie Casey	Independent	—	6	2	0
1924	Eddie Casey	Independent	—	3	4	2
1925	Eddie Casey	Independent	—	1	6	0
1926	Arthur Sampson	Independent	—	4	4	0
1927	Arthur Sampson	Independent	—	8	0	0
1928	Arthur Sampson	Independent	—	5	2	1
1929	Arthur Sampson	Independent	—	5	1	2
1930	Lewis Manly	Independent	—	5	2	0
1931	Lewis Manly	Independent	—	3	2	2
1932	Lewis Manly	Independent	—	5	1	2
1933	Lewis Manly	Independent	—	6	2	0
1934	Lewis Manly	Independent	—	8	0	0
1935	Lewis Manly	Independent	—	1	5	2
1936	Lewis Manly	Independent	—	3	3	1
1937	Lewis Manly	Independent	—	3	4	1
1938	Lewis Manly	Independent	—	1	6	1
1939	Lewis Manly	Independent	—	3	4	1
1940	Lewis Manly	Independent	—	4	4	0
1941	Lewis Manly	Independent	—	5	3	0
1942	Lewis Manly	Independent	—	2	5	1
1943	Lewis Manly	Independent	—	6	2	0
1944	Lewis Manly	Independent	—	1	4	1
1945	Lewis Manly	Independent	—	4	1	0
1946	Frederick M. Ellis	Independent	—	1	6	0
1947	Frederick M. Ellis	Independent	—	5	3	0
1948	Frederick M. Ellis	Independent	—	3	4	1
1949	Frederick M. Ellis	Independent	—	5	3	1
1950	Frederick M. Ellis	Independent	—	4	4	1
1951	Frederick M. Ellis	Independent	—	0	7	2
1952	Frederick M. Ellis	Independent	—	3	4	1
1953	Frederick M. Ellis	Independent	—	4	3	0
1954	Harry Arlanson	Independent	—	6	2	0
1955	Harry Arlanson	Independent	—	5	2	0
1956	Harry Arlanson	Independent	—	6	1	0
1957	Harry Arlanson	Independent	—	6	1	1
1958	Harry Arlanson	Independent	—	6	2	0
1959	Harry Arlanson	Independent	—	5	2	1
1960	Harry Arlanson	Independent	—	7	1	0
1961	Harry Arlanson	Independent	—	5	3	0
1962	Harry Arlanson	Independent	—	5	3	0
1963	Harry Arlanson	Independent	—	2	6	0
1964	Harry Arlanson	Independent	—	3	5	0
1965	Harry Arlanson	Independent	—	1	7	0
1966	Rocco J. Carzo	Independent	—	1	7	0
1967	Rocco J. Carzo	Independent	—	1	6	1
1968	Rocco J. Carzo	Independent	—	5	3	0
1969	Rocco J. Carzo	Independent	—	6	2	0
1970	Rocco J. Carzo	Independent	—	1	7	0
1971	Rocco J. Carzo	NESCAC	—	3	5	0
1972	Rocco J. Carzo	NESCAC	—	4	4	0
1973	Rocco J. Carzo	NESCAC	—	1	7	0
1974	Paul Pawlak	NESCAC	—	3	5	0
1975	Paul Pawlak	NESCAC	—	2	6	0
1976	Paul Pawlak	NESCAC	—	6	2	0
1977	Paul Pawlak	NESCAC	—	3	5	0
1978	Vic Gatto	NESCAC	—	5	3	0
1979	Vic Gatto	NESCAC	—	8	0	0
1980	Vic Gatto	NESCAC	—	6	2	0
1981	Vic Gatto	NESCAC	—	5	2	1
1982	Vic Gatto	NESCAC	—	6	2	0
1983	Vic Gatto	NESCAC	—	4	3	1
1984	Vic Gatto	NESCAC	—	0	7	1
1985	Duane Ford	NESCAC	—	3	4	1
1986	Duane Ford	NESCAC	—	7	1	0
1987	Duane Ford	NESCAC	—	4	4	0
1988	Duane Ford	NESCAC	—	4	3	1
1989	Duane Ford	NESCAC	—	6	2	0
1990	Duane Ford	NESCAC	—	6	2	0
1991	Duane Ford	NESCAC	—	5	3	0
1992	Duane Ford	NESCAC	—	3	4	1
1993	Duane Ford	NESCAC	—	1	7	0
1994	Bill Samko	NESCAC	—	2	6	0
1995	Bill Samko	NESCAC	—	4	4	0
1996	Bill Samko	NESCAC	—	1	7	0
1997	Bill Samko	NESCAC	—	3	5	0
1998	Bill Samko	NESCAC	—	7	1	0
1999	Bill Samko	NESCAC	—	4	4	0
2000	Bill Samko	NESCAC	T–7th	2	6	0
2001	Bill Samko	NESCAC	3rd	6	2	0
2002	Bill Samko	NESCAC	T-6th	3	5	0
2003	Bill Samko	NESCAC	T–3rd	5	3	0
2004	Bill Samko	NESCAC	T–7th	2	6	0
2005	Bill Samko	NESCAC	T–7th	2	6	0
2006	Bill Samko	NESCAC	5th	4	4	0
2007	Bill Samko	NESCAC	4th	5	3	0
2008	Bill Samko	NESCAC	T–5th	4	4	0
2009	Bill Samko	NESCAC	T–8th	2	6	0
2010	Bill Samko	NESCAC	T–9th	1	7	0
2011	Jay Civetti	NESCAC	10th	0	8	0
2012	Jay Civetti	NESCAC	10th	0	8	0
2013	Jay Civetti	NESCAC	T–9th	0	8	0
2014	Jay Civetti	NESCAC	6th	4	4	0
2015	Jay Civetti	NESCAC	3rd	6	2	0
2016	Jay Civetti	NESCAC	2nd	7	1	0
2017	Jay Civetti	NESCAC	6th	5	4	0
2018	Jay Civetti	NESCAC	3rd	7	2	0
2019	Jay Civetti	NESCAC	T–5th	4	5	0
2020	Jay Civetti	NESCAC	Season cancelled due to the COVID-19 pandemic			
2021	Jay Civetti	NESCAC	6th	4	5	0
2022	Jay Civetti	NESCAC	T–3rd	6	3	0
2023	Jay Civetti	NESCAC	T–3rd	6	3	0
2024	Jay Civetti	NESCAC	T–2nd	7	2	0
2025	Jay Civetti	NESCAC	7th	4	5	0

== Individual accomplishments ==
=== College Football Hall of Fame inductees ===
In 1951, the College Football Hall of Fame opened in South Bend, Indiana. Since then, Tufts has had 1 player inducted into the Hall of Fame.

Player	Pos.	Tenure	Inducted
William Grinnell	End	1932–1934	1997
