= Trinity–Wesleyan football rivalry =

American college sports rivalry

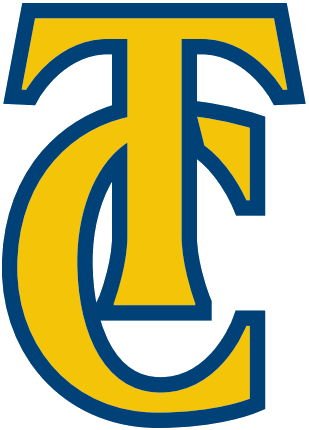
- Trinity Wesleyan
- First meeting: October 31, 1885; Wesleyan, 60–0
- Latest meeting: November 14, 2026; Wesleyan, 27–20
- Next meeting: November 13, 2027

Statistics
- Total meetings: 125
- All-time series: Trinity leads, 67–57–1 (.540)
- Largest victory: Wesleyan, 60–0 (1885)
- Longest win streak: Trinity, 13 (2001–2013)
- Current win streak: Wesleyan, 3 (2024–present)

Locations in Connecticut

The Trinity–Wesleyan football rivalry is an American college football rivalry between the Trinity Bantams of Trinity College and the Wesleyan Cardinals of Wesleyan University.

== Game results ==
Trinity victories	Wesleyan victories

No.	Date	Location	Winner	Score
1	October 31, 1885	Hartford, CT	Wesleyan	60–0
2	October 15, 1887	Hartford, CT	Wesleyan	58–0
3	October 5, 1889	Hartford, CT	Trinity	4–2
4	November 12, 1889	Middletown, CT	Wesleyan	6–0
5	October 4, 1890	Middletown, CT	Wesleyan	12–5
6	October 17, 1891	Hartford, CT	Trinity	4–0
7	October 7, 1893	Middletown, CT	Wesleyan	18–0
8	October 18, 1893	Hartford, CT	Wesleyan	14–6
9	November 16, 1895	Hartford, CT	Wesleyan	14–6
10	November 14, 1896	Middletown, CT	Wesleyan	24–12
11	November 6, 1897	Hartford, CT	Wesleyan	6–4
12	November 5, 1898	Middletown, CT	Wesleyan	30–0
13	October 27, 1900	Hartford, CT	Trinity	5–0
14	November 16, 1901	Middletown, CT	Wesleyan	11–0
15	October 25, 1902	Hartford, CT	Wesleyan	23–6
16	November 7, 1903	Middletown, CT	Wesleyan	67–11
17	November 12, 1904	Hartford, CT	Wesleyan	32–6
18	October 26, 1907	Hartford, CT	Trinity	5–0
19	November 7, 1908	Middletown, CT	Trinity	42–0
20	November 13, 1909	Hartford, CT	Trinity	12–6
21	October 29, 1910	Middletown, CT	Trinity	5–0
22	October 28, 1911	Hartford, CT	Trinity	14–0
23	November 6, 1912	Middletown, CT	Wesleyan	14–0
24	November 22, 1913	Hartford, CT	Trinity	14–0
25	November 14, 1914	Middletown, CT	Wesleyan	3–0
26	November 20, 1915	Hartford, CT	Trinity	9–0
27	October 9, 1920	Middletown, CT	Wesleyan	20–0
28	October 31, 1925	Middletown, CT	Trinity	6–0
29	October 30, 1926	Hartford, CT	Wesleyan	21–0
30	October 29, 1927	Middletown, CT	Wesleyan	6–2
31	November 3, 1928	Hartford, CT	Wesleyan	24–0
32	November 2, 1929	Middletown, CT	Wesleyan	19–13
33	November 1, 1930	Hartford, CT	Wesleyan	13–0
34	October 31, 1931	Middletown, CT	Wesleyan	13–0
35	October 29, 1932	Hartford, CT	Wesleyan	7–0
36	November 4, 1933	Middletown, CT	Trinity	14–6
37	November 3, 1934	Hartford, CT	Trinity	27–0
38	November 2, 1935	Middletown, CT	Wesleyan	9–7
39	October 31, 1936	Middletown, CT	Trinity	20–0
40	October 30, 1937	Hartford, CT	Wesleyan	7–0
41	October 29, 1938	Middletown, CT	Wesleyan	7–6
42	November 18, 1939	Hartford, CT	Wesleyan	27–13
43	November 16, 1940	Middletown, CT	Wesleyan	13–0
44	November 15, 1941	Hartford, CT	Wesleyan	27–0
45	November 14, 1942	Middletown, CT	Wesleyan	8–0
46	November 16, 1946	Middletown, CT	Wesleyan	21–14
47	November 15, 1947	Hartford, CT	Wesleyan	13–0
48	November 13, 1948	Middletown, CT	Wesleyan	16–0
49	November 12, 1949	Hartford, CT	Trinity	7–6
50	November 18, 1950	Middletown, CT	Trinity	24–7
51	November 17, 1951	Hartford, CT	Wesleyan	6–3
52	November 15, 1952	Middletown, CT	Wesleyan	7–6
53	November 14, 1953	Hartford, CT	Wesleyan	12–7
54	November 13, 1954	Middletown, CT	Trinity	26–14
55	November 12, 1955	Hartford, CT	Trinity	46–6
56	November 17, 1956	Middletown, CT	Trinity	14–7
57	November 16, 1957	Hartford, CT	Trinity	20–19
58	November 15, 1958	Middletown, CT	Wesleyan	22–18
59	November 14, 1959	Hartford, CT	Trinity	32–6
60	November 12, 1960	Middletown, CT	Tie	22–22
61	November 18, 1961	Hartford, CT	Trinity	42–15
62	November 17, 1962	Middletown, CT	Trinity	36–24
63	November 16, 1963	Hartford, CT	Wesleyan	46–6

No.	Date	Location	Winner	Score
64	November 14, 1964	Middletown, CT	Wesleyan	34–21
65	November 13, 1965	Hartford, CT	Wesleyan	19–14
66	November 12, 1966	Middletown, CT	Trinity	20–18
67	November 18, 1967	Hartford, CT	Trinity	32–14
68	November 16, 1968	Middletown, CT	Trinity	19–17
69	November 15, 1969	Hartford, CT	Wesleyan	21–8
70	November 14, 1970	Middletown, CT	Trinity	24–14
71	November 13, 1971	Hartford, CT	Trinity	21–0
72	November 18, 1972	Middletown, CT	Wesleyan	33–28
73	November 15, 1973	Hartford, CT	Trinity	33–16
74	November 16, 1974	Middletown, CT	Trinity	21–15
75	November 15, 1975	Hartford, CT	Wesleyan	14–11
76	November 13, 1976	Middletown, CT	Wesleyan	44–0
77	November 12, 1977	Hartford, CT	Wesleyan	43–12
78	November 11, 1978	Middletown, CT	Trinity	43–10
79	November 10, 1979	Hartford, CT	Wesleyan	17–7
80	November 8, 1980	Middletown, CT	Trinity	28–6
81	November 14, 1981	Hartford, CT	Trinity	25–24
82	November 13, 1982	Middletown, CT	Trinity	37–6
83	November 12, 1983	Hartford, CT	Trinity	31–17
84	November 10, 1984	Middletown, CT	Trinity	20–14
85	November 9, 1985	Hartford, CT	Wesleyan	41–20
86	November 8, 1986	Middletown, CT	Wesleyan	21–17
87	November 14, 1987	Hartford, CT	Trinity	48–7
88	November 12, 1988	Middletown, CT	Trinity	38–15
89	November 11, 1989	Hartford, CT	Trinity	37–7
90	November 10, 1990	Middletown, CT	Trinity	10–9
91	November 9, 1991	Hartford, CT	Trinity	47–11
92	November 14, 1992	Middletown, CT	Trinity	37–13
93	November 13, 1993	Hartford, CT	Trinity	32–8
94	November 12, 1994	Middletown, CT	Trinity	40–0
95	November 11, 1995	Hartford, CT	Trinity	22–0
96	November 9, 1996	Middletown, CT	Trinity	35–28
97	November 8, 1997	Hartford, CT	Wesleyan	19–7
98	November 14, 1998	Middletown, CT	Wesleyan	49–35
99	November 13, 1999	Hartford, CT	Trinity	26–12
100	November 11, 2000	Middletown, CT	Wesleyan	37–13
101	November 10, 2001	Hartford, CT	Trinity	28–14
102	November 9, 2002	Middletown, CT	Trinity	26–10
103	November 8, 2003	Hartford, CT	Trinity	53–0
104	November 13, 2004	Middletown, CT	Trinity	40–6
105	November 12, 2005	Hartford, CT	Trinity	63–7
106	November 11, 2006	Middletown, CT	Trinity	41–0
107	November 10, 2007	Hartford, CT	Trinity	32–14
108	November 8, 2008	Middletown, CT	Trinity	38–14
109	November 14, 2009	Hartford, CT	Trinity	26–23^{2OT}
110	November 13, 2010	Middletown, CT	Trinity	27–20
111	November 12, 2011	Hartford, CT	Trinity	27–0
112	November 10, 2012	Middletown, CT	Trinity	30–24 ^{OT}
113	November 9, 2013	Hartford, CT	Trinity	40–10
114	November 8, 2014	Middletown, CT	Wesleyan	20–19
115	November 14, 2015	Hartford, CT	Trinity	17–13
116	November 12, 2016	Middletown, CT	Trinity	45–21
117	November 11, 2017	Hartford, CT	Trinity	28–3
118	November 10, 2018	Middletown, CT	Trinity	9–0
119	November 9, 2019	Hartford, CT	Wesleyan	28–20
120	November 13, 2021	Middletown, CT	Trinity	14–7
121	November 12, 2022	Hartford, CT	Trinity	31–14
122	November 11, 2023	Middletown, CT	Trinity	58–6
123	November 9, 2024	Hartford, CT	Wesleyan	27–17
124	November 8, 2025	Middletown, CT	Wesleyan	31–28
125	November 14, 2026	Hartford, CT	Wesleyan	27–20
Series: Trinity leads 67–57–1

== See also ==
- List of NCAA college football rivalry games
