= Jessee/Miller Field =

Stadium in Hartford, Connecticut

Coordinates: 41.749768°N 72.689388°W

- The Coop
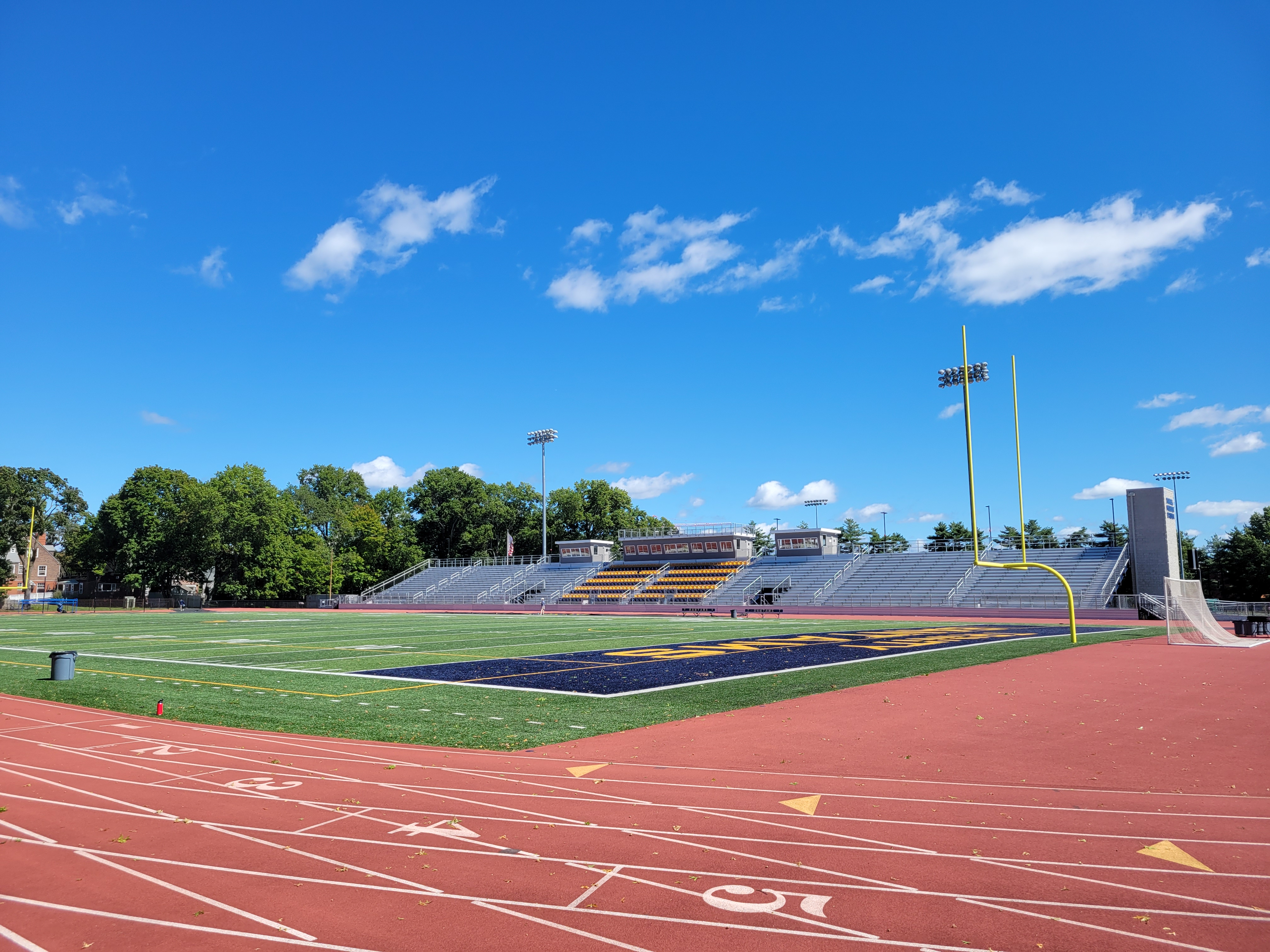
- View of the stadium in September 2024
- Interactive map of Jessee/Miller Field
- Former names: Jessee Field (1966–1999)
- Address: Hartford, Connecticut; United States
- Capacity: 5,500
- Type: Stadium
- Surface: FieldTurf (2002–present); Natural grass (1900–2001)
- Current use: Football; Lacrosse

Construction
- Opened: September 13, 1900; 125 years ago

Tenants
- Trinity Bantams teams: football (1900–present); Lacrosse

Website
- bantamsports.com/jessee-miller-field

Jessee/Miller Field is a stadium located on the campus of Trinity College in Hartford, Connecticut. It is the home field of the Trinity Bantams football team and the school's men's lacrosse team. The facility has a 400-meter track and a stadium seating capacity of 5,500. Named after Trinity's head football coaches Dan Jessee and Don Miller, it is the tenth-oldest college football field in United States. In recent years the field has also been affectionately referred to as The Coop, in reference to Trinity's mascot, the Bantam.

The first game was played on September 13, 1900. The stadium, often referred to as "Trinity Field", had no official name until November 5, 1966, when it was named as "Jessee Field" for the retiring Jessee during his final season as head football coach. Jessee was the head football coach at Trinity from 1932 to 1966, compiling a record of 150–76–7. The stadium was renamed Jessee/Miller Field on November 13, 1999 to honor Jessee's successor, Miller. Miller retired in 1998 as the all-time winningest coach in NCAA Division III football history in New England, compiling a record of 174–77–5 in 32 seasons as head coach of the Bantams.
