= Trinity Bantams football =

Football program representing Trinity College in Connecticut, USA

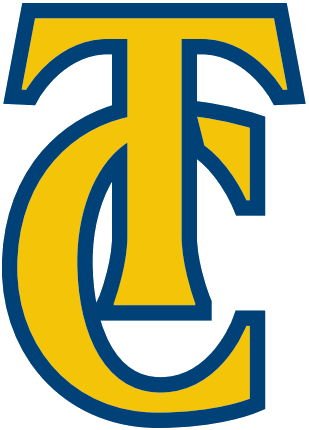
- First season: 1877; 149 years ago
- Athletic director: Drew Galbraith
- Head coach: Jeff Devanney; 19th season, 128–23 (.848)
- Location: Hartford, Connecticut
- Stadium: Jessee/Miller Field (capacity: 5,500)
- NCAA division: Division III
- Conference: NESCAC
- Colors: Blue and yellow
- Website: bantamsports.com/football

The Trinity Bantams football team of Trinity College in Hartford, Connecticut competes in the New England Small College Athletic Conference (NESCAC), a league of small liberal arts colleges.

The Bantams held the nation's longest home winning streak through 13 seasons (1998–2011) and second-longest in consecutive wins (53) through the 2014 season.

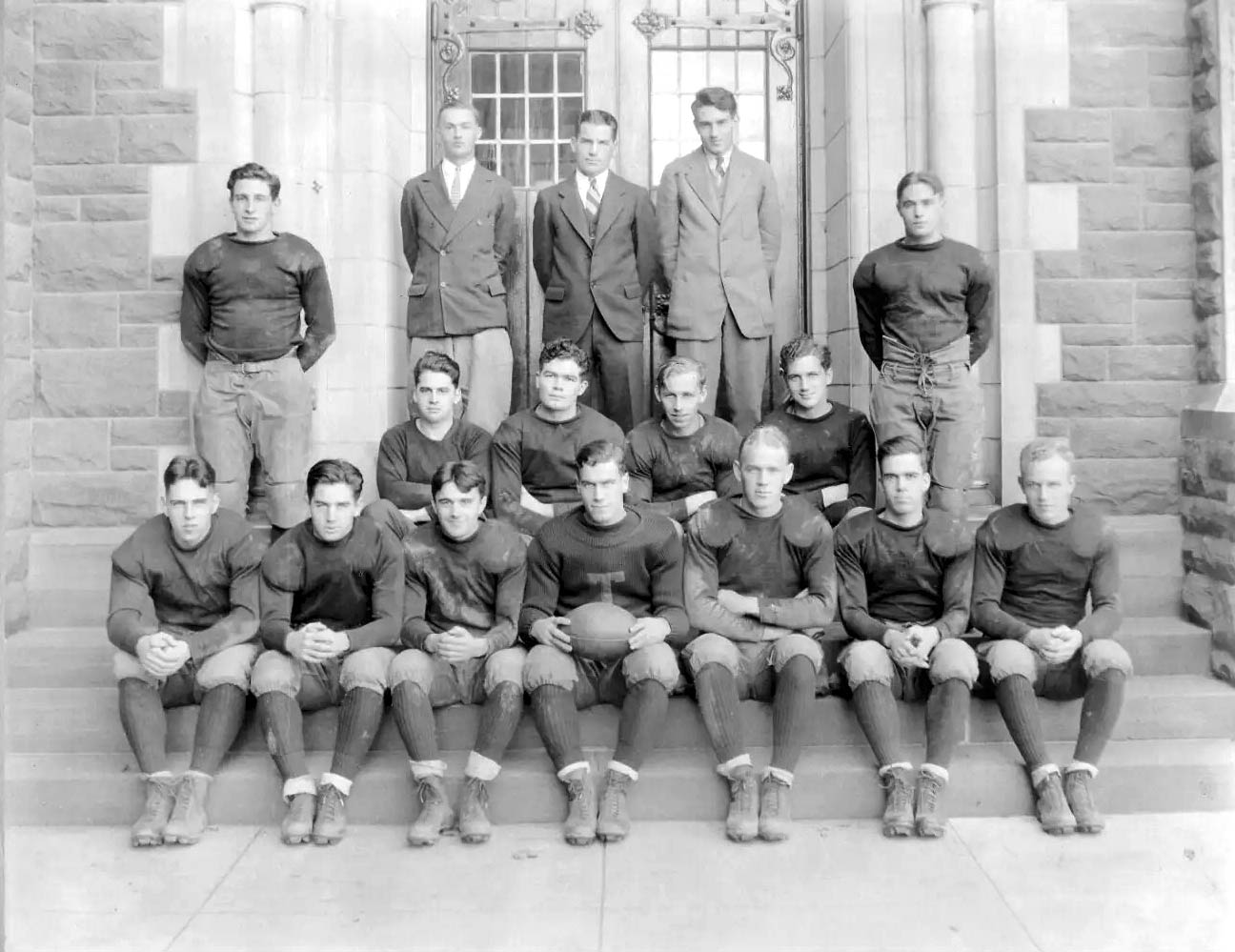
Team of Trinity in the 1920s

Trinity has the third-highest number of victories of any NCAA Division III football program in New England and the second-best all-time winning percentage among NESCAC schools. The Bantams' recent history includes only one losing season in the past 25 years. The Trinity football team is coached by Jeff Devanney (2005–present). Devanney follows in the footsteps of Chuck Priore, Dan Jessee, and Don Miller. Jessee compiled a 150–76–7 record from 1933 to 1966, and Miller followed with a 174–77–5 mark over the next 32 seasons. Miller retired after the 1998 season as the most successful coach in Trinity football history and the all-time most successful Division III coach in New England history.

In 2011, Mickey Kobrosky '37 became the first member of the Trinity College football program to be inducted into the College Football Hall of Fame.

Trinity's final game every year is played against rival Wesleyan.

== Championships ==
=== NESCAC ===
The NESCAC began formally crowning a champion in 2000.

- Champions: 2002, 2003, 2004, 2005, 2008, 2012, 2016, 2017, 2018, 2022
- Runners-up: 2006, 2007, 2009, 2010, 2011, 2015
- Best record: 1911, 1934, 1949, 1954, 1955, 1970, 1978, 1980, 1987, 1991, 1993, 1996, 2002, 2003, 2004, 2005, 2008, 2012, 2016, 2017, 2018 and 2022

== Postseason appearances ==
=== NCAA Division III playoffs ===
The Bantams will make their first appearance in the NCAA Division III playoffs in 2026, the first year of NESCAC participation.

Year	Round	Opponent	Result
2026	First Round	RPI	TBP

== Jessee/Miller Field ==
The Trinity Bantam football team plays their home games on Jessee/Miller Field, the tenth-oldest college football field in the United States, dating back to 1900. Jessee/Miller Field is named for the Dan Jessee and Don Miller who helmed the team from 1932 to 1998.
