= 1957 All-Southern Conference football team =

The 1957 All-Southern Conference football team consists of American football players chosen by the Associated Press (AP) and United Press (UP) for the All-Southern Conference football team for the 1957 college football season.

== All-Southern Conference selections ==
=== Backs ===
- Bobby Jordan, VMI (AP-1)
- Mike Sommer, George Washington (AP-1)
- Sam Woolwine, VMI (AP-1)
- Bobby Schwarze, The Citadel (AP-1)
- Larry Krutko, West Virginia (AP-2)
- Duke Johnston, VMI (AP-2)
- Billy Baker, Furman (AP-2)
- Ralph Anastasio, West Virginia (AP-2)

=== Ends ===
- Paul Maguire, The Citadel (AP-1)
- Larry Peccatiello, William & Mary (AP-1)
- Carroll Dale, Virginia Tech (AP-2)
- Terry Fairbanks, West Virginia (AP-2)

=== Tackles ===
- Jim McFalls, VMI (AP-1)
- Elliott Schaubach, William & Mary (AP-1)
- Ed Rutsch, George Washington (AP-2)
- Jim Burks, Virginia Tech (AP-2)

=== Guards ===
- Chuck Howley, West Virginia (AP-1)
- Lou Farmer, VMI (AP-1)
- Joe Nicely, West Virginia (AP-2)
- Pat Lamberti, Richmond (AP-2)

=== Centers ===
- Bill Rush, William & Mary (AP-1)
- Bill Price, Davidson (AP-2)

== Key ==
AP = Associated Press

== See also ==
- 1957 College Football All-America Team
