= 1956 All-Southern Conference football team =

The 1956 All-Southern Conference football team consists of American football players chosen by the Associated Press (AP) and United Press (UP) for the All-Southern Conference football team for the 1956 college football season.

== All-Southern Conference selections ==
=== Backs ===
- Charlie Sidwell, William & Mary (AP-1)
- Larry Krutko, West Virginia (AP-1)
- Jimmy Lugar, Virginia Tech (AP-1)
- Sam Woolwine, VMI (AP-1)
- Mickey Trimarki, West Virginia (AP-2)
- Bobby Wolfenden, Virginia Tech (AP-2)
- Bobby Jordan, VMI (AP-2)
- Mike Sommer, George Washington (AP-2)

=== Ends ===
- Walt Brodie, William & Mary (AP-1)
- Joe Kopnisky, West Virginia (AP-1)
- Paul Thompson, George Washington (AP-2)
- Grover Jones, Virginia Tech (AP-2)

=== Tackles ===
- Bill Underdonk, West Virginia (AP-1)
- Dave Liddick, George Washington (AP-1)
- Pat Lamberti, Richmond (AP-2)
- Jim McFalls, VMI (AP-2)

=== Guards ===
- Gene Lathey, West Virginia (AP-1)
- Joe Nicely, West Virginia (AP-1)
- Lou Farmer, VMI (AP-2)
- Ed Sakach, George Washington (AP-2)

=== Centers ===
- Chuck Howley, West Virginia (AP-1)
- John Hall, Virginia Tech (AP-2)

== Key ==
AP = Associated Press

== See also ==
- 1956 College Football All-America Team
