= 1956 George Washington Colonials football team =

American college football season

1956 George Washington Colonials football

Sun Bowl champion

Sun Bowl, W 13–0 vs. Texas Western
- Conference: Southern Conference

Ranking
- AP: No. 17
- Record: 8–1–1 (5–1 SoCon)
- Head coach: Bo Sherman (5th season)
- Home stadium: Griffith Stadium

1956 Southern Conference football standings
	Conf.					Overall
Team	W		L		T	W		L		T
West Virginia $	5	–	0	–	0	6	–	4	–	0
VPI	3	–	0	–	0	7	–	2	–	1
No. 17 George Washington	5	–	1	–	0	8	–	1	–	1
Davidson	2	–	2	–	1	5	–	3	–	1
Furman	2	–	2	–	0	2	–	8	–	0
VMI	2	–	3	–	1	3	–	6	–	1
Richmond	2	–	5	–	0	4	–	5	–	0
The Citadel	1	–	3	–	0	3	–	5	–	1
Washington and Lee	0	–	1	–	0	1	–	7	–	0
William & Mary	0	–	5	–	0	0	–	9	–	1
$ – Conference champion; Rankings from AP Poll

The 1956 George Washington Colonials football team was an American football team that represented George Washington University (GWU) as a member of the Southern Conference (SoCon) during the 1956 college football season. In its fifth season under head coach Bo Sherman, the team compiled an 8–1–1 record (5–1 in conference games), finished third in the SoCon, and outscored opponents by a total of 171 to 81.

The team's sole loss was to SoCon champion West Virginia. George Washington was ranked No. 17 in the final AP Poll and finished the season with a victory over the 1957 Sun Bowl over Texas Western which is GWU's only football bowl game.

At the end of the regular season, the team voted quarterback Ray Looney and guard Ed Sakach as the team's best players. Tackle Dave Liddick was the only George Washington player to receive first-team honors on the 1956 All-Southern Conference football team.

The team's statistical leaders included Looney with 262 passing yards, Pete Spera with 345 rushing yards, and Thompson with 156 receiving yards.

== Schedule ==
Date	Opponent	Rank	Site	Result	Attendance	Source
September 22	at Miami (OH)*		Miami Field; Oxford, OH	W 7–6	6,546	
September 29	at Furman		Sirrine Stadium; Greenville, SC	W 10–0	6,000	
October 5	Hardin–Simmons*		Griffith Stadium; Washington, DC	W 13–7	10,000	
October 13	at Boston University*	No. 16	Boston University Field; Boston, MA	T 20–20	9,104	
October 19	VMI		Griffith Stadium; Washington, DC	W 40–14	10,000	
October 26	William & Mary	No. 17	Griffith Stadium; Washington, DC	W 16–14	6,000	
November 3	at West Virginia	No. 14	Mountaineer Field; Morgantown, WV	L 0–14	22,000	
November 9	Richmond		Griffith Stadium; Washington, DC	W 32–6	4,000	
November 17	at The Citadel	No. 18	Johnson Hagood Stadium; Charleston, SC	W 20–0	8,500	
January 1, 1957	at Texas Western*	No. 17	Kidd Field; El Paso, TX (Sun Bowl)	W 13–0	15,000	
*Non-conference game; Rankings from AP Poll released prior to the game

== Personnel ==
- Claude "Bo" Austin, co-captain and fullback, fullback, 195 rushing yards
- Bill Berry, end, 200 pounds
- Dick Claypool, right halfback, 185 pounds, 170 rushing yards, 109 receiving yards
- Ted Colna, right halfback, sophomore, 5'10", 178 pounds, 277 rushing yards
- Francis Gleason, end, 195 pounds
- Jack Henzes, quarterback, 175 pounds, 112 passing yards
- Donald Herman, wide receiver, 50 receiving yards, 12 points scored
- Joe Hince, center, senior, 190 pounds
- Marion Hoar, guard, 195 pounds
- Bob Jewett, tackle, 210 pounds
- Jack Kesock, end, 190 pounds
- Dave Liddick, tackle, 240 pounds
- Ray Looney, quarterback, 185 pounds, 262 passing yards, 256 rushing yards
- Bill McHenry, tackle, 200 pounds
- Ray Murray, guard, 200 pounds
- Ed Rutsch, tackle, 250 pounds
- Ed Sakach, guard, 225 pounds
- Bob Shuba, fullback, 185 pounds, 179 rushing yards
- Mike Sommer, left halfback, 190 pounds, 185 rushing yards
- Pete Spera, left halfback, 5'8", 175 pounds, Belleville, NJ, 345 rushing yards
- Bob Sutton, guard, 200 pounds
- Paul Thompson, co-captain and end, 200 pounds, 157 receiving yards, 12 points scored
- Mickey Varley, center, 210 pounds
