= 1955 Clemson Tigers football team =

American college football season

1955 Clemson Tigers football
- Conference: Atlantic Coast Conference
- Record: 7–3 (3–1 ACC)
- Head coach: Frank Howard (16th season)
- Captain: Don King
- Home stadium: Memorial Stadium

1955 Atlantic Coast Conference football standings
	Conf.					Overall
Team	W		L		T	W		L		T
No. 3 Maryland +	4	–	0	–	0	10	–	1	–	0
Duke +	4	–	0	–	0	7	–	2	–	1
Clemson	3	–	1	–	0	7	–	3	–	0
Wake Forest	3	–	3	–	1	5	–	4	–	1
North Carolina	3	–	3	–	0	3	–	7	–	0
NC State	0	–	2	–	1	4	–	5	–	1
South Carolina	1	–	5	–	0	3	–	6	–	0
Virginia	0	–	4	–	0	1	–	9	–	0
+ – Conference co-champions; Rankings from AP poll

The 1955 Clemson Tigers football team was an American football team that represented Clemson College in the Atlantic Coast Conference (ACC) during the 1955 college football season. In its 16th season under head coach Frank Howard, the team compiled a 7–3 record (3–1 against conference opponents), finished third in the ACC, and outscored opponents by a total of 206 to 144. The team played its home games at Memorial Stadium in Clemson, South Carolina.

Quarterback Don King was the team captain. The team's statistical leaders included Don King with 586 passing yards, halfback Joel Wells with 782 rushing yards, and halfback Joe Pagliei with 43 points (7 touchdowns, 1 extra point).

Joel Wells was selected by both the Associated Press and United Press as a first-team player on the 1955 All-Atlantic Coast Conference football team. Six Clemson players were also named to the 1955 All-South Carolina football team: Wells, back Billy O'Dell, end Willie Smith, tackle Dick Marazza, guard John Grdijan, and center Wingo Avery.

== Schedule ==
Date	Time	Opponent	Rank	Site	Result	Attendance	Source
September 17	8:00 p.m.	Presbyterian*		Memorial Stadium; Clemson, SC	W 33–0	16,000	
September 24	2:00 p.m.	at Virginia		Scott Stadium; Charlottesville, VA	W 20–7	13,000	
October 1	2:00 p.m.	Georgia*		Memorial Stadium; Clemson, SC (rivalry)	W 14–7	20,000	
October 8	9:00 p.m.	at Rice*	No. 16	Rice Stadium; Houston, TX	L 7–21	37,500	
October 20	2:00 p.m.	at South Carolina		Carolina Stadium; Columbia, SC (rivalry)	W 28–14	35,000	
October 29	2:00 p.m.	Wake Forest		Memorial Stadium; Clemson, SC	W 19–13	20,000	
November 5	1:30 p.m.	vs. VPI*		Victory Stadium; Roanoke, VA	W 21–16	8,000	
November 12	2:00 p.m.	No. 2 Maryland^{†}		Memorial Stadium; Clemson, SC	L 12–25	30,000	
November 19	3:00 p.m.	vs. No. 12 Auburn*		Ladd Memorial Stadium; Mobile, AL (rivalry)	L 0–21		
November 26	2:00 p.m.	at Furman*		Sirrine Stadium; Greenville, SC	W 40–20		
*Non-conference game; ^{†}Homecoming; Rankings from AP Poll released prior to the game; All times are in Eastern time
