= 1956 Orange Bowl =

Postseason college football bowl game

- 22nd Orange Bowl
- Burdine Stadium in Miami, Florida, hosted the Orange Bowl.
Maryland Terrapins	Oklahoma Sooners
(10–0)	(10–0)
ACC	Big Seven
6	20
Head coach: Jim Tatum	Head coach: Bud Wilkinson
AP / Coaches; 3 / 3	AP / Coaches; 1 / 1
	1	2	3	4	Total
Maryland	0	0	6	0	6
Oklahoma	0	0	14	6	20
- Date: January 2, 1956
- Season: 1955
- Stadium: Burdine Stadium
- Location: Miami, Florida
- Favorite: Oklahoma by 7 points
- Referee: John Waldorf (Big Seven; split crew: Big Seven, ACC)
- Attendance: 76,561

United States TV coverage
- Network: CBS
- Announcers: Tom Harmon (play-by-play); Chris Schenkel (color)

The 1956 Orange Bowl was a college football bowl game between the Oklahoma Sooners and the Maryland Terrapins. It was played on January 2, because New Year's Day was a Sunday.

== Background ==
Oklahoma and Maryland were the respectives champions of the Big Seven Conference and Atlantic Coast Conference; both were undefeated and ranked in the top three. (The Rose Bowl matched up #2 Michigan State and #4 UCLA.) This was Oklahoma's ninth consecutive conference title under Wilkinson and tenth straight overall, with a 30-game winning streak. Maryland shared the ACC title with Duke, though the Terrapins reached the Orange Bowl for the first time since January 1954, which was also against Oklahoma. Tatum had coached the Sooners in 1946 before departing for Maryland. Oklahoma entered the game favored by a touchdown.

== Game summary ==
Maryland scored on a 15-yard touchdown run by Ed Vereb and led 6–0 at halftime. The Sooners took over in the second half, starting with Tommy McDonald's 32-yard punt return that gave them the ball at the Terrapin 46. Seven plays later, McDonald score on a four-yard touchdown run, the highlight being the Sooner offense running 3 plays in 38 seconds. The next Sooner possession used the hurry-up offense again, leading to a Jay O'Neal touchdown sneak to make it 14–6. Maryland tried to narrow the lead, but Jerry Tubbs intercepted a pass at the Sooner 26. Maryland tried to score again in the fourth, even reaching Oklahoma's 30. However, Carl Dodd intercepted Lynn Beightol's pass and returned it 82 yards for the touchdown, sealing the victory for the Sooners; they had already sealed the national championship as both final polls were released in late November, at the end of the regular season.

1956 Orange Bowl

Quarter	1	2	3	4	Total
No. 3 Maryland	0	6	0	0	6
No. 1 Oklahoma	0	0	14	6	20

at Burdine Stadium • Miami, Florida

- Date: January 2, 1956
- Game attendance: 76,561
- TV announcers (CBS): Tom Harmon (play-by-play) & Chris Schenkel (color)
- Pittsburgh Post-Gazette game summary

Game information

First quarter
No scoring
Second quarter
Third quarter
Fourth quarter

=== Statistics ===
Statistics	UMD	OKLA
First downs	9	16
Plays–yards	233	255
Rushes–yards	187	202
Passing yards	46	53
Passing: comp–att–int	3-10-3	4-10-1
Time of possession		

Team	Category	Player	Statistics
Maryland	Passing		
Maryland	Rushing		
Maryland	Receiving		
Oklahoma	Passing		
Oklahoma	Rushing		
Oklahoma	Receiving		

== Aftermath ==
The Terrapins did not return to the Orange Bowl for 46 years, until January 2002, also a defeat. Oklahoma again went undefeated in 1956 and repeated as consensus national champions, but did not play a bowl game. At the time, the Big Seven had a no-repeat policy for the postseason, so the Sooners did not play in bowl games after the 1954 and 1956 seasons. They returned to the Orange Bowl the following season in January 1958 and won, but their win streak had been ended at 47 by Notre Dame in mid-November with a 7–0 shutout in Norman.
