= 1955 All-Atlantic Coast Conference football team =

American college football all-star team

The 1955 All-Atlantic Coast Conference football team consists of American football players chosen by the Associated Press (AP) and the United Press (UP) as the best players at each position from the players on teams participating in the Atlantic Coast Conference ("ACC") during the 1954 college football season.

The 1955 Maryland Terrapins football team tied for the ACC championship and was ranked No. 3 in the final AP poll. Maryland placed six players on the first team. Maryland center Bob Pellegrini was the only ACC player in 1955 to also be recognized as a consensus All-American.

The 1955 Duke Blue Devils football team also tied for the ACC championship. The Blue Devils placed four players on the first team.

Players selected for the first team by both the AP and UP are designated below in bold.

== All-Atlantic Coast selections ==
=== Ends ===
- **Will Frye**, North Carolina (AP-1; UP-1)
- Darrell "Sonny" Sorrell, Duke (AP-1; UP-2)
- Bill Walker, Maryland (AP-2; UP-1)
- Russell Dennis, Maryland (AP-2; UP-2)
- Julius Derrick, South Carolina (UP-3)
- John Collar, NC State (UP-3)

=== Tackles ===
- **Bob Bartholomew**, Wake Forest (AP-1; UP-1)
- **Mike Sandusky**, Maryland (AP-1; UP-1)
- Doug Knotts, Duke (AP-2)
- Dick Marazza, Clemson (AP-2; UP-3)
- Jack Maultsby, North Carolina (UP-2)
- Sid DeLoatch, Duke (UP-2)
- John Bagonis, NC State (UP-3)

=== Guards ===
- **Jesse Birchfield**, Duke (AP-1; UP-1)
- Jack Davis, Maryland (AP-1; UP-2)
- Al D'Angelo, North Carolina State (AP-2; UP-1)
- John Polzer, Virginia (AP-2; UP-2)
- Bill Koman, North Carolina (UP-3)
- Mark Viola, Wake Forest (UP-3)

=== Centers ===
- **Bob Pelligrini**, Maryland (AP-1; UP-1)
- Wingo Avery, Clemson (AP-2; UP-2)
- Ronnie Falls, Duke (UP-3)

=== Backs ===
- **Ed Vereb**, Maryland (AP-1; UP-1)
- **Bob Pascal**, Duke (AP-1; UP-1)
- **Joel Wells**, Clemson (AP-1; UP-1)
- Frank Tamburello, Maryland (AP-1; UP-2)
- Sonny Jurgensen, Duke (AP-2; UP-1) (Pro Football Hall of Fame)
- Bryant Aldridge, Duke (AP-2; UP-3)
- Jim Bakhtiar, Virginia (AP-2; UP-3)
- Nick Consoles, Wake Forest (AP-2)
- Billy O'Dell, Clemson (UP-2)
- Dick Christy, NC State (UP-2)
- Billy Ray Barnes, Wake Forest (UP-2)
- Don King, Clemson (UP-3)
- Joe Pagliei, Clemson (UP-3)

== Key ==
AP = Associated Press

UP = United Press

== See also ==
- 1955 College Football All-America Team
