= 1956 West Virginia Mountaineers football team =

American college football season

1956 West Virginia Mountaineers football

SoCon champion
- Conference: Southern Conference
- Record: 6–4 (5–0 SoCon)
- Head coach: Art Lewis (7th season)
- Home stadium: Mountaineer Field

1956 Southern Conference football standings
	Conf.					Overall
Team	W		L		T	W		L		T
West Virginia $	5	–	0	–	0	6	–	4	–	0
VPI	3	–	0	–	0	7	–	2	–	1
No. 17 George Washington	5	–	1	–	0	8	–	1	–	1
Davidson	2	–	2	–	1	5	–	3	–	1
Furman	2	–	2	–	0	2	–	8	–	0
VMI	2	–	3	–	1	3	–	6	–	1
Richmond	2	–	5	–	0	4	–	5	–	0
The Citadel	1	–	3	–	0	3	–	5	–	1
Washington and Lee	0	–	1	–	0	1	–	7	–	0
William & Mary	0	–	5	–	0	0	–	9	–	1
$ – Conference champion; Rankings from AP Poll

The 1956 West Virginia Mountaineers football team represented West Virginia University as a member of the Southern Conference (SoCon) during the 1956 college football season. Led by seventh-year head coach Art Lewis, the Mountaineers compiled an overall record of 6–4 with a mark of 5–0 in conference play, winning the SoCon title for the fourth consecutive season.

== Schedule ==
Date	Opponent	Rank	Site	Result	Attendance	Source
September 22	No. 10 Pittsburgh*		Mountaineer Field; Morgantown, WV (rivalry)	L 13–14	34,800	
September 29	Richmond		Mountaineer Field; Morgantown, WV	W 30–6	17,000	
October 6	at Texas*		Memorial Stadium; Austin, TX	W 7–6	30,000	
October 13	at Syracuse*	No. 20	Archbold Stadium; Syracuse, NY (rivalry)	L 20–27	25,000	
October 20	at William & Mary		Cary Field; Williamsburg, VA	W 20–13	10,000	
October 27	at No. 18 Penn State*		New Beaver Field; University Park, PA (rivalry)	L 6–16	27,814–29,244	
November 3	No. 14 George Washington		Mountaineer Field; Morgantown, WV	W 14–0	22,000	
November 10	VMI		Mountaineer Field; Morgantown, WV	W 13–6	12,000	
November 17	Furman^{†}		Mountaineer Field; Morgantown, WV	W 7–0	5,000	
November 23	at No. 6 Miami (FL)*		Burdine Stadium; Miami, FL	L 0–18	37,073	
*Non-conference game; ^{†}Homecoming; Rankings from AP Poll released prior to the game

== Roster ==
1956 West Virginia Mountaineers football team roster
Players
Coaches
Offense

Pos.	#	Name	Class
QB	10	Alex Szuch	Sr
End	84	Joe Kopnisky	Sr
End	12	Walter Beene	Sr
End	87	Roger Chancey	Jr
End	89	Jim Jones	Jr
OL-LT	77	Dick Guesman	Jr
OL-LG	64	Gene Lathey	Sr
OL-RG	65	Jerry Urda	Sr
Tackle	66	Chuck Howley	Jr
Guard	72	Paul Sharkady	Jr
Tackle	74	Jim Pickett	Jr
Guard	55	Barry Blake	Sr
Guard	56	Chuck Billak	Jr
Guard	63	Bob Guenther	Jr
Center	61	Joe Nicely	Jr
HB	21	Paul Shepherd	Sr
HB	22	Victor "Jack" Rabbits	Sr
HB	24	Ralph Anastasio	Jr
HB	41	Sammy Sizemore	Jr
FB	23	Ray Borst	Sr
FB	49	Larry Krutko	Jr
FB	34	Noel Whipkey	So
QB	15	Mickey Trimarki	Jr
Tackle	75	Jim Hillen	So
Tackle	79	Ed Sommer	Jr

Defense

Pos.	#	Name	Class
DE	84	Joe Kopnisky	Sr
DE	12	Walter Beene	Sr
DE	87	Roger Chancey	Jr
DE	89	Jim Jones	Jr
DT	77	Dick Guesman	Jr
DT	74	Jim Pickett	Jr
DT	75	Jim Hillen	So
DT	79	Ed Sommer	Jr
NG	72	Paul Sharkady	Jr
DG	64	Gene Lathey	Sr
DG	65	Jerry Urda	Sr
DG	55	Barry Blake	Sr
DG	56	Chuck Billak	Jr
DG	63	Bob Guenther	Jr
LB	66	Chuck Howley	Jr
LB	61	Joe Nicely	Jr
LB	23	Ray Borst	Sr
LB	49	Larry Krutko	Jr
LB	34	Noel Whipkey	So
DB	21	Paul Shepherd	Sr
DB	22	Victor "Jack" Rabbits	Sr
DB	24	Ralph Anastasio	Jr
DB	41	Sammy Sizemore	Jr
S	10	Alex Szuch	Sr
S	15	Mickey Trimarki	Jr

Special teams

Pos.	#	Name	Class
P	10	Alex Szuch	Sr
K	23	Ray Borst	Sr
KR	22	Victor "Jack" Rabbits	Sr
KR	41	Sammy Sizemore	Jr
PR	21	Paul Shepherd	Sr
PR	24	Ralph Anastasio	Jr

Head coach

Art "Pappy" Lewis

Coordinators/assistant coaches

- Gene Corum (Ends)
- Russ Crane (Defensive Line)
- Ed Shockey (Backfield)
- Bob Snyder (Backfield)
- Quentin Barnette (Freshman Coach)
- Charles Donaldson (Freshman Coach)

Legend

- (C) Team captain
- (S) Suspended
- (I) Ineligible
- Injured
- Redshirt
