= 1955 Wake Forest Demon Deacons football team =

American college football season

1955 Wake Forest Demon Deacons football
- Conference: Atlantic Coast Conference
- Record: 5–4–1 (3–3–1 ACC)
- Head coach: Tom Rogers (5th season)
- Captains: Bob Bartholomew; Nick Consoles
- Home stadium: Groves Stadium

1955 Atlantic Coast Conference football standings
	Conf.					Overall
Team	W		L		T	W		L		T
No. 3 Maryland +	4	–	0	–	0	10	–	1	–	0
Duke +	4	–	0	–	0	7	–	2	–	1
Clemson	3	–	1	–	0	7	–	3	–	0
Wake Forest	3	–	3	–	1	5	–	4	–	1
North Carolina	3	–	3	–	0	3	–	7	–	0
NC State	0	–	2	–	1	4	–	5	–	1
South Carolina	1	–	5	–	0	3	–	6	–	0
Virginia	0	–	4	–	0	1	–	9	–	0
+ – Conference co-champions; Rankings from AP poll

The 1955 Wake Forest Demon Deacons football team was an American football team that represented Wake Forest University during the 1955 college football season. In their fifth season under head coach Tom Rogers, the Demon Deacons compiled a 5–4–1 record and finished in fourth place in the Atlantic Coast Conference with a 3–3–1 record against conference opponents.

Tackle Bob Bartholomew was selected by both the Associated Press and the United Press International as a first-team player on the 1955 All-Atlantic Coast Conference football team.

== Schedule ==
Date	Opponent	Site	Result	Attendance	Source
September 17	VPI*	Groves Stadium; Wake Forest, NC	W 13–0	7,500	
September 24	vs. South Carolina	Bowman Gray Stadium; Winston-Salem, NC	W 34–19	8,500	
October 1	at No. 13 West Virginia*	Mountaineer Field; Morgantown, WV	L 0–46	25,000	
October 8	at No. 1 Maryland	Byrd Stadium; College Park, MD	L 7–28	14,000	
October 15	at NC State	Riddick Stadium; Raleigh, NC (rivalry)	T 13–13	13,000	
October 22	North Carolina	Groves Stadium; Wake Forest, NC (rivalry)	W 25–0	13,000	
October 29	at Clemson	Memorial Stadium; Clemson, SC	L 13–19	20,000	
November 5	William & Mary*	Groves Stadium; Wake Forest, NC	W 13–7	4,500	
November 12	at Virginia	Scott Stadium; Charlottesville, VA	W 13–7	12,000	
November 19	at No. 20 Duke	Duke Stadium; Durham, NC (rivalry)	L 0–14	15,000	
*Non-conference game; Rankings from AP Poll released prior to the game

== Team leaders ==
Category	Team Leader	Att/Cth	Yds
Passing	Nick Consoles	66/123	787
Rushing	Bill Barnes	116	401
Receiving	Bill Barnes	31	349
