= 1955 Washington and Lee Generals football team =

American college football season

1955 Washington and Lee Generals football
- Conference: Southern Conference
- Record: 0–7 (0–1 SoCon)
- Head coach: Bill Chipley (1st season)
- Home stadium: Wilson Field

1955 Southern Conference football standings
	Conf.					Overall
Team	W		L		T	W		L		T
No. 19 West Virginia $	4	–	0	–	0	8	–	2	–	0
VPI	2	–	1	–	1	6	–	3	–	1
Davidson	3	–	2	–	0	5	–	4	–	0
George Washington	3	–	2	–	0	5	–	4	–	0
Richmond	3	–	2	–	2	4	–	3	–	2
The Citadel	2	–	2	–	0	5	–	4	–	0
Furman	1	–	1	–	0	1	–	9	–	0
William & Mary	1	–	3	–	1	1	–	7	–	1
VMI	1	–	6	–	0	1	–	9	–	0
Washington and Lee	0	–	1	–	0	0	–	7	–	0
$ – Conference champion; Rankings from AP Poll

The 1955 Washington and Lee Generals football team was an American football team that represented the Washington and Lee University as a member of the Southern Conference (SoCon) during the 1955 college football season. Led by first-year head coach Bill Chipley, the Generals compiled an overall record of 0–7 with a mark of 0–1 in conference play, placing last out of ten teams in the SoCon.

This season marked the return of Generals' football after the University trustees canceled the Generals' 1954 season after deciding to no longer provide subsidies for intercollegiate athletics.

== Schedule ==
Date	Time	Opponent	Site	Result	Attendance	Source
October 8	2:15 p.m.	Centre*	Wilson Field; Lexington, VA	L 7–24		
October 15		at Davidson	Richardson Stadium; Davidson, NC	L 0–54	7,000	
October 22		Southwestern (TN)*	Wilson Field; Lexington, VA	L 12–33	4,000	
October 29		at Washington University*	Francis Field; St. Louis, MO	L 0–27	7,500	
November 5		at Hampden–Sydney*	Venable Field; Hampden Sydney, VA	L 7–35	3,000	
November 12		at Sewanee*	Hardee Field; Sewanee, TN	L 0–12		
November 19		West Virginia Tech*	Wilson Field; Lexington, VA	L 0–13	1,000	
*Non-conference game; All times are in Eastern time
