= 1956 Richmond Spiders football team =

American college football season

1956 Richmond Spiders football
- Conference: Southern Conference
- Record: 4–5 (2–5 SoCon)
- Head coach: Ed Merrick (6th season)
- Captains: Dave May; Duke Thacker
- Home stadium: City Stadium

1956 Southern Conference football standings
	Conf.					Overall
Team	W		L		T	W		L		T
West Virginia $	5	–	0	–	0	6	–	4	–	0
VPI	3	–	0	–	0	7	–	2	–	1
No. 17 George Washington	5	–	1	–	0	8	–	1	–	1
Davidson	2	–	2	–	1	5	–	3	–	1
Furman	2	–	2	–	0	2	–	8	–	0
VMI	2	–	3	–	1	3	–	6	–	1
Richmond	2	–	5	–	0	4	–	5	–	0
The Citadel	1	–	3	–	0	3	–	5	–	1
Washington and Lee	0	–	1	–	0	1	–	7	–	0
William & Mary	0	–	5	–	0	0	–	9	–	1
$ – Conference champion; Rankings from AP Poll

The 1956 Richmond Spiders football team was an American football team that represented the University of Richmond as a member of the Southern Conference (SoCon) during the 1956 college football season. In their sixth season under head coach Ed Merrick, Richmond compiled a 4–5 record, with a mark of 2–5 in conference play, finishing in seventh place in the SoCon.

== Schedule ==
Date	Opponent	Site	Result	Attendance	Source
September 21	Randolph–Macon*	City Stadium; Richmond, VA	W 38–0	7,500	
September 29	at West Virginia	Mountaineer Field; Morgantown, WV	L 6–30	17,000	
October 6	VMI	City Stadium; Richmond, VA (rivalry)	L 20–35	6,500	
October 13	The Citadel	City Stadium; Richmond, VA	W 7–3		
October 20	No. 18 VPI	City Stadium; Richmond, VA	L 14–46	15,000	
November 3	at Davidson	Richardson Stadium; Davidson, NC	L 0–7		
November 9	at George Washington	Griffith Stadium; Washington, DC	L 6–32	4,000	
November 17	at East Carolina*	College Stadium; Greenville, NC	W 45–7	5,500	
November 22	William & Mary	City Stadium; Richmond, VA (rivalry)	W 6–0	5,000	
*Non-conference game; Rankings from AP Poll released prior to the game
