= 1955 Richmond Spiders football team =

American college football season

1955 Richmond Spiders football
- Conference: Southern Conference
- Record: 4–3–2 (3–2–2 SoCon)
- Head coach: Ed Merrick (5th season)
- Captains: Frank Pajaczkowski; Erik Christensen
- Home stadium: City Stadium

1955 Southern Conference football standings
	Conf.					Overall
Team	W		L		T	W		L		T
No. 19 West Virginia $	4	–	0	–	0	8	–	2	–	0
VPI	2	–	1	–	1	6	–	3	–	1
Davidson	3	–	2	–	0	5	–	4	–	0
George Washington	3	–	2	–	0	5	–	4	–	0
Richmond	3	–	2	–	2	4	–	3	–	2
The Citadel	2	–	2	–	0	5	–	4	–	0
Furman	1	–	1	–	0	1	–	9	–	0
William & Mary	1	–	3	–	1	1	–	7	–	1
VMI	1	–	6	–	0	1	–	9	–	0
Washington and Lee	0	–	1	–	0	0	–	7	–	0
$ – Conference champion; Rankings from AP Poll

The 1955 Richmond Spiders football team was an American football team that represented the University of Richmond as a member of the Southern Conference (SoCon) during the 1955 college football season ). Led by fifth-year head coach Ed Merrick, the Spiders compiled an overall record of 4–3–2 with a mark of 3–2–2 in conference, placing fifth in the SoCon. The team's captains were Frank Pajaczkowski and Erik Christensen.

== Schedule ==
Date	Opponent	Site	Result	Attendance	Source
September 17	Randolph–Macon*	City Stadium; Richmond, VA	W 33–6	7,000	
September 24	at West Virginia	Mountaineer Field; Morgantown, WV	L 12–33	21,000	
October 1	at VMI	Wilson Field; Lexington, VA (rivalry)	W 21–0	4,000	
October 7	The Citadel	City Stadium; Richmond, VA	L 12–14	14,000	
October 15	at VPI	Miles Stadium; Blacksburg, VA	T 7–7	8,000	
October 29	at Villanova*	Villanova Stadium; Villanova, PA	L 14–16	7,935	
November 5	Davidson^{†}	City Stadium; Richmond, VA	W 19–0	5,000	
November 12	George Washington	City Stadium; Richmond, VA	W 7–0	5,000	
November 24	William & Mary	City Stadium; Richmond, VA (rivalry)	T 6–6	11,000	
*Non-conference game; ^{†}Homecoming
