= 1955 George Washington Colonials football team =

American college football season

1955 George Washington Colonials football
- Conference: Southern Conference
- Record: 5–4 (3–2 SoCon)
- Head coach: Bo Sherman (4th season)
- Home stadium: Griffith Stadium

1955 Southern Conference football standings
	Conf.					Overall
Team	W		L		T	W		L		T
No. 19 West Virginia $	4	–	0	–	0	8	–	2	–	0
VPI	2	–	1	–	1	6	–	3	–	1
Davidson	3	–	2	–	0	5	–	4	–	0
George Washington	3	–	2	–	0	5	–	4	–	0
Richmond	3	–	2	–	2	4	–	3	–	2
The Citadel	2	–	2	–	0	5	–	4	–	0
Furman	1	–	1	–	0	1	–	9	–	0
William & Mary	1	–	3	–	1	1	–	7	–	1
VMI	1	–	6	–	0	1	–	9	–	0
Washington and Lee	0	–	1	–	0	0	–	7	–	0
$ – Conference champion; Rankings from AP Poll

The 1955 George Washington Colonials football team was an American football team that represented George Washington University as part of the Southern Conference during the 1955 college football season. In their fourth season under head coach Bo Sherman, the team compiled a 5–4 record (3–2 in the SoCon).

== Schedule ==
Date	Opponent	Site	Result	Attendance	Source
September 24	at VMI	Victory Stadium; Roanoke, VA	W 25–6	8,000	
October 1	at Virginia*	Scott Stadium; Charlottesville, VA	W 13–0	13,000	
October 8	vs. Florida*	Gator Bowl Stadium; Jacksonville, FL	L 0–28	18,000	
October 15	at Penn*	Franklin Field; Philadelphia, PA	W 25–6	17,000	
October 22	at William & Mary	Cary Field; Williamsburg, VA	W 16–0	4,000	
October 29	at VPI	Miles Stadium; Blacksburg, VA	W 13–7	10,000	
November 4	No. 7 West Virginia	Griffith Stadium; Washington, DC	L 7–13	22,500	
November 12	at Richmond	City Stadium; Richmond, VA	L 0–7	5,000	
November 19	at No. 2 Maryland*	Byrd Stadium; College Park, MD	L 0–19	20,000	
*Non-conference game; Rankings from AP Poll released prior to the game
