= 1955 West Virginia Mountaineers football team =

American college football season

1955 West Virginia Mountaineers football

SoCon champion
- Conference: Southern Conference

Ranking
- Coaches: No. 17
- AP: No. 19
- Record: 8–2 (4–0 SoCon)
- Head coach: Art Lewis (6th season)
- Home stadium: Mountaineer Field

1955 Southern Conference football standings
| | Conf. | | | | | Overall |
| Team | W | | L | | T | W | | L | | T |
|---|---|---|---|---|---|---|---|---|---|---|
| No. 19 West Virginia $ | 4 | – | 0 | – | 0 | 8 | – | 2 | – | 0 |
| VPI | 2 | – | 1 | – | 1 | 6 | – | 3 | – | 1 |
| Davidson | 3 | – | 2 | – | 0 | 5 | – | 4 | – | 0 |
| George Washington | 3 | – | 2 | – | 0 | 5 | – | 4 | – | 0 |
| Richmond | 3 | – | 2 | – | 2 | 4 | – | 3 | – | 2 |
| The Citadel | 2 | – | 2 | – | 0 | 5 | – | 4 | – | 0 |
| Furman | 1 | – | 1 | – | 0 | 1 | – | 9 | – | 0 |
| William & Mary | 1 | – | 3 | – | 1 | 1 | – | 7 | – | 1 |
| VMI | 1 | – | 6 | – | 0 | 1 | – | 9 | – | 0 |
| Washington and Lee | 0 | – | 1 | – | 0 | 0 | – | 7 | – | 0 |
$ – Conference champion; Rankings from AP Poll

The 1955 West Virginia Mountaineers football team was an American football team that represented West Virginia University as a member of the Southern Conference (SoCon) during the 1955 college football season. Led by sixth-year head coach Art Lewis, the Mountaineers compiled an overall record of 8–2 with a mark of 4–0 in conference play, winning the SoCon title for the third consecutive season. West Virginia was ranked No. 19 in the final AP Poll and No. 17 in the final Coaches Poll.

== Schedule ==
| Date | Time | Opponent | Rank | Site | Result | Attendance | Source |
|---|---|---|---|---|---|---|---|
| September 24 | | Richmond | | Mountaineer Field; Morgantown, WV | W 33–12 | 21,000 | |
| October 1 | | Wake Forest* | No. 13 | Mountaineer Field; Morgantown, WV | W 46–0 | 25,000 | |
| October 8 | 1:45 p.m. | vs. VMI | No. 11 | Mitchell Stadium; Bluefield, WV | W 47–12 | 11,000 | |
| October 15 | | William & Mary^{†} | No. 10 | Mountaineer Field; Morgantown, WV | W 39–13 | 22,000 | |
| October 22 | | Penn State* | No. 8 | Mountaineer Field; Morgantown, WV (rivalry) | W 21–7 | 34,400 | |
| October 29 | | at Marquette* | No. 7 | Marquette Stadium; Milwaukee, WI | W 39–0 | 16,000 | |
| November 4 | | at George Washington | No. 7 | Griffith Stadium; Washington, DC | W 13–7 | 22,500 | |
| November 12 | | at No. 17 Pittsburgh* | No. 6 | Pitt Stadium; Pittsburgh, PA (rivalry) | L 7–26 | 55,772–57,996 | |
| November 19 | | Syracuse* | No. 13 | Mountaineer Field; Morgantown, WV (rivalry) | L 13–20 | 22,000 | |
| November 25 | | at NC State* | | Riddick Stadium; Raleigh, NC | W 27–7 | 4,500 | |
*Non-conference game; ^{†}Homecoming; Rankings from AP Poll released prior to the game; All times are in Eastern time
