= 1955 The Citadel Bulldogs football team =

American college football season

1955 The Citadel Bulldogs football
- Conference: Southern Conference
- Record: 5–4 (2–2 SoCon)
- Head coach: John Sauer (1st season)
- Home stadium: Johnson Hagood Stadium

1955 Southern Conference football standings
	Conf.					Overall
Team	W		L		T	W		L		T
No. 19 West Virginia $	4	–	0	–	0	8	–	2	–	0
VPI	2	–	1	–	1	6	–	3	–	1
Davidson	3	–	2	–	0	5	–	4	–	0
George Washington	3	–	2	–	0	5	–	4	–	0
Richmond	3	–	2	–	2	4	–	3	–	2
The Citadel	2	–	2	–	0	5	–	4	–	0
Furman	1	–	1	–	0	1	–	9	–	0
William & Mary	1	–	3	–	1	1	–	7	–	1
VMI	1	–	6	–	0	1	–	9	–	0
Washington and Lee	0	–	1	–	0	0	–	7	–	0
$ – Conference champion; Rankings from AP Poll

The 1955 The Citadel Bulldogs football team represented The Citadel, The Military College of South Carolina in the 1955 college football season. John Sauer served as head coach for the first season. The Bulldogs played as members of the Southern Conference and played home games at Johnson Hagood Stadium.

== Schedule ==
Date	Opponent	Site	Result	Attendance	Source
September 24	Elon*	Johnson Hagood Stadium; Charleston, SC	W 26–18		
October 1	at Davidson	Richardson Stadium; Davidson, NC	L 2–6		
October 7	at Richmond	City Stadium; Richmond, VA	W 14–2	14,000	
October 15	Furman	Johnson Hagood Stadium; Charleston, SC (rivalry)	W 25–19		
October 22	Presbyterian*	Johnson Hagood Stadium; Charleston, SC	W 14–13		
October 28	vs. Wofford*	County Fairgrounds; Orangeburg, SC (rivalry)	L 7–27	9,000	
November 5	Newberry*	Johnson Hagood Stadium; Charleston, SC	W 13–7	8,500	
November 12	VMI^{†}	Johnson Hagood Stadium; Charleston, SC (rivalry)	L 0–14		
November 19	at Florida State*	Doak Campbell Stadium; Tallahassee, FL	L 0–39	15,765	
*Non-conference game; ^{†}Homecoming
