= 1955 Furman Purple Hurricane football team =

American college football season

1955 Furman Purple Hurricane football
- Conference: Southern Conference
- Record: 1–9 (1–1 SoCon)
- Head coach: Homer Hobbs (1st season)
- Captain: John Popson
- Home stadium: Sirrine Stadium

1955 Southern Conference football standings
	Conf.					Overall
Team	W		L		T	W		L		T
No. 19 West Virginia $	4	–	0	–	0	8	–	2	–	0
VPI	2	–	1	–	1	6	–	3	–	1
Davidson	3	–	2	–	0	5	–	4	–	0
George Washington	3	–	2	–	0	5	–	4	–	0
Richmond	3	–	2	–	2	4	–	3	–	2
The Citadel	2	–	2	–	0	5	–	4	–	0
Furman	1	–	1	–	0	1	–	9	–	0
William & Mary	1	–	3	–	1	1	–	7	–	1
VMI	1	–	6	–	0	1	–	9	–	0
Washington and Lee	0	–	1	–	0	0	–	7	–	0
$ – Conference champion; Rankings from AP Poll

The 1955 Furman Purple Hurricane football team was an American football team that represented Furman University as a member of the Southern Conference (SoCon) during the 1955 college football season. Led by first-year head coach Homer Hobbs, the Purple Hurricane compiled an overall record of 1–9 with a mark of 1–1 in conference play, tying for sixth place in the SoCon.

== Schedule ==
Date	Time	Opponent	Site	Result	Attendance	Source
September 15		Newberry*	Sirrine Stadium; Greenville, SC	L 0–14	12,000	
September 24		at No. 14 Army*	Michie Stadium; West Point, NY	L 0–81	17,000	
October 1	8:00 p.m.	at Wofford*	Snyder Field; Spartanburg, SC (rivalry)	L 6–27	4,500	
October 8		at South Carolina*	Carolina Stadium; Columbia, SC	L 0–19	15,000	
October 15		at The Citadel	Johnson Hagood Stadium; Charleston, SC (rivalry)	L 19–25		
October 22		at No. 9 Auburn*	Cliff Hare Stadium; Auburn, AL	L 0–52		
October 29		NC State*	Sirrine Stadium; Greenville, SC	L 7–33		
November 11		Florida State*	Sirrine Stadium; Greenville, SC	L 6–19	3,000	
November 19	2:00 p.m.	Davidson	Sirrine Stadium; Greenville, SC	W 13–9	3,000	
November 26		Clemson*	Sirrine Stadium; Greenville, SC	L 20–40		
*Non-conference game; Rankings from AP Poll released prior to the game; All times are in Eastern time
