= 1955 Virginia Cavaliers football team =

American college football season

1955 Virginia Cavaliers football
- Conference: Atlantic Coast Conference
- Record: 1–9 (0–4 ACC)
- Head coach: Ned McDonald (3rd season)
- Captain: John Polzer
- Home stadium: Scott Stadium

1955 Atlantic Coast Conference football standings
	Conf.					Overall
Team	W		L		T	W		L		T
No. 3 Maryland +	4	–	0	–	0	10	–	1	–	0
Duke +	4	–	0	–	0	7	–	2	–	1
Clemson	3	–	1	–	0	7	–	3	–	0
Wake Forest	3	–	3	–	1	5	–	4	–	1
North Carolina	3	–	3	–	0	3	–	7	–	0
NC State	0	–	2	–	1	4	–	5	–	1
South Carolina	1	–	5	–	0	3	–	6	–	0
Virginia	0	–	4	–	0	1	–	9	–	0
+ – Conference co-champions; Rankings from AP poll

The 1955 Virginia Cavaliers football team represented the University of Virginia during the 1955 college football season. The Cavaliers were led by third-year head coach Ned McDonald and played their home games at Scott Stadium in Charlottesville, Virginia. They competed as members of the Atlantic Coast Conference, their second year in the league, and the league's third year overall. Virginia once again failed to pick up their first ACC win, finishing winless in conference games. At the conclusion of a 1–9 campaign, McDonald resigned as head coach.

== Schedule ==
Date	Time	Opponent	Site	Result	Attendance	Source
September 24		Clemson	Scott Stadium; Charlottesville, VA	L 7–20	13,000	
October 1		George Washington*	Scott Stadium; Charlottesville, VA	L 0–13	13,000	
October 8	2:30 p.m.	vs. Penn State*	City Stadium; Richmond, VA (Tobacco Bowl)	L 7–26	18,000	
October 15		VMI*^{†}	Scott Stadium; Charlottesville, VA	W 20–13	16,000	
October 22		vs. VPI*	Victory Stadium; Roanoke, VA (rivalry)	L 13–17	15,000	
October 29		at Vanderbilt*	Dudley Field; Nashville, TN	L 7–34	15,500	
November 5		at Pittsburgh*	Pitt Stadium; Pittsburgh, PA	L 7–18	18,867–21,938	
November 12		Wake Forest	Scott Stadium; Charlottesville, VA	L 7–13	12,000	
November 19		at North Carolina	Kenan Memorial Stadium; Chapel Hill, NC (South's Oldest Rivalry)	L 14–26	9,000	
November 26		South Carolina	Scott Stadium; Charlottesville, VA	L 14–21	9,000	
*Non-conference game; ^{†}Homecoming; All times are in Eastern time
