= Mike Sandusky =

American football player (born 1935)

No. 62
- Position: Guard

Personal information
- Born: March 14, 1935 (age 91); Newark, New Jersey, U.S.
- Listed height: 6 ft 0 in (1.83 m)
- Listed weight: 231 lb (105 kg)

Career information
- High school: Bound Brook (Bound Brook, New Jersey)
- College: Maryland
- NFL draft: 1957: 4th round, 46th overall pick

Career history
- Pittsburgh Steelers (1957–1965)

Awards and highlights
- Pro Bowl (1960); National champion (1953); First-team All-American (1955); 2× First-team All-ACC (1955, 1956)

Career NFL statistics
- Games played: 104
- Games started: 100
- Fumble recoveries: 12
- Stats at Pro Football Reference

Mike Sandusky (born March 13, 1935) is an American former professional football player who was a guard for nine seasons with the Pittsburgh Steelers of the National Football League (NFL). He was selected by the San Francisco 49ers (46th overall) in the 1957 NFL draft. Sandusky played college football for the Maryland Terrapins. Sandusky played high school football at Bound Brook High School in Bound Brook, New Jersey. He is the only alumnus of Bound Brook to play in the NFL, as of 2024.

The Steelers acquired Sandusky from the 49ers in September, 1957 and he soon became a fixture at the left side of the line. While undersized at 6-foot, 231 pounds, he possessed a low center of gravity that helped generate an unusual amount of leverage and physical strength. Sandusky was among the most dependable and durable linemen of his era. He sat out only two games in his first seven seasons in the league.

Following retirement after the 1965 season, Sandusky became the head football coach at Sayreville War Memorial High School in Parlin, New Jersey
