= 1956 VMI Keydets football team =

American college football season

1956 VMI Keydets football
- Conference: Southern Conference
- Record: 3–6–1 (2–3–1 SoCon)
- Head coach: John McKenna (4th season)
- Home stadium: Alumni Field

1956 Southern Conference football standings
	Conf.					Overall
Team	W		L		T	W		L		T
West Virginia $	5	–	0	–	0	6	–	4	–	0
VPI	3	–	0	–	0	7	–	2	–	1
No. 17 George Washington	5	–	1	–	0	8	–	1	–	1
Davidson	2	–	2	–	1	5	–	3	–	1
Furman	2	–	2	–	0	2	–	8	–	0
VMI	2	–	3	–	1	3	–	6	–	1
Richmond	2	–	5	–	0	4	–	5	–	0
The Citadel	1	–	3	–	0	3	–	5	–	1
Washington and Lee	0	–	1	–	0	1	–	7	–	0
William & Mary	0	–	5	–	0	0	–	9	–	1
$ – Conference champion; Rankings from AP Poll

The 1956 VMI Keydets football team was an American football team that represented the Virginia Military Institute (VMI) during the 1956 college football season as a member of the Southern Conference. In their fourth year under head coach John McKenna, the team compiled an overall record of 3–6–1.

== Schedule ==
Date	Opponent	Site	Result	Attendance	Source
September 15	vs. Stetson*	Stewart Field; St. Petersburg, FL	W 47–6	5,000	
September 22	at Virginia*	Scott Stadium; Charlottesville, VA	L 0–18	22,000	
September 29	at Army*	Michie Stadium; West Point, NY	L 12–32	26,150	
October 6	at Richmond	City Stadium; Richmond, VA (rivalry)	W 35–20	6,500	
October 13	Lehigh*	Alumni Field; Lexington, VA	L 20–27	4,500	
October 19	at George Washington	Griffith Stadium; Washington, DC	L 14–40	10,000	
October 27	at Davidson	Richardson Field; Davidson, NC	T 13–13	5,000	
November 3	vs. William & Mary	City Stadium; Lynchburg, VA (rivalry)	W 20–6	5,000	
November 10	at West Virginia	Mountaineer Field; Morgantown, WV	L 6–13	12,000	
November 22	vs. VPI	Victory Stadium; Roanoke, VA (rivalry)	L 0–45	24,000	
*Non-conference game
