= Bill Chipley =

American football player and coach (1920–2002)

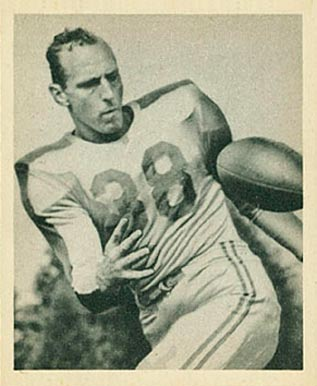
- Chipley on a 1948 Bowman football card

No. 38
- Positions: End, defensive back

Personal information
- Born: July 2, 1920; Lynchburg, Virginia, U.S.
- Died: December 27, 2002 (aged 82); Lookout Mountain, Tennessee, U.S.
- Listed height: 6 ft 3 in (1.91 m)
- Listed weight: 199 lb (90 kg)

Career information
- High school: E. C. Glass (Lynchburg)
- College: Clemson (1939–1941); Washington & Lee (1946)
- NFL draft: 1947: 8th round, 57th overall pick

Career history

Playing
- Boston Yanks/New York Bulldogs (1947–1949)

Coaching
- Washington & Lee (1955–1956) (Head coach)

Awards and highlights
- First-team All-SoCon (1946)

Career NFL statistics
- Receptions: 75
- Receiving yards: 867
- Receiving touchdowns: 4
- Stats at Pro Football Reference

William Allen Chipley (July 2, 1920 – December 27, 2002) was an American football player and coach. He played professionally for three seasons in the National Football League (NFL) with the Boston Yanks/New York Bulldogs. He was selected by the Yanks in the eighth round of the 1947 NFL draft. He first enrolled at Clemson University before transferring to Washington and Lee University. Chipley served as the head football coach at Washington and Lee from 1955 to 1956, compiling a record of 1–14.

== Early life and college ==
William Allen Chipley was born on July 2, 1920, in Lynchburg, Virginia. He attended E. C. Glass High School in Lynchburg.

Chipley first played college football for the Clemson Tigers from 1939 to 1941. His football career was interrupted by a stint in the United States Marine Corps during World War II. He played for the Jacksonville Naval Air Station Fliers football team in 1942. After the war, he played college football for the Washington and Lee Generals in 1946, earning Associated Press first-team All-Southern Conference and United Press second-team All-Southern Conference honors.

== Professional career ==
Chipley was selected by the Boston Yanks in the eight round, with the 57th overall pick, of the 1947 NFL draft, and by the Buffalo Bills in the 14th round, with the 106th overall pick, of the 1947 AAFC draft. He chose to signed with the Yanks. He played in six games, starting two, for the Yanks during the 1947 season, catching five passes for 105 yards and one touchdown. He appeared in 12 games, starting one, for the team in 1948, recording 13 receptions for 131 yards and a touchdown and three interceptions for 52 yards and a touchdown. Chipley played in 12 games, starting nine, for the newly-renamed New York Bulldogs in 1949, catching 57 passes for 631 yards and two touchdowns. He became a free agent after the 1949 season.

== Later life ==
Chipley was the head football coach at Washington and Lee from 1955 to 1956, compiling a record of 1–14.

Chipley died on December 27, 2002, in Lookout Mountain, Tennessee.

== Head coaching record ==
Year	Team	Overall	Conference	Standing	Bowl/playoffs
Washington and Lee Generals (Southern Conference) (1955–1956)
1955	Washington and Lee	0–7	0–1	10th	
1956	Washington and Lee	1–7	0–1	9th	
Washington and Lee:		1–14	0–2		
Total:		1–14			
