= 1956 All-Atlantic Coast Conference football team =

College football award

The 1956 All-Atlantic Coast Conference football team consists of American football players chosen by various selectors for their All-Atlantic Coast Conference ("ACC") teams for the 1956 college football season. Selectors in 1956 included the Associated Press (AP) and United Press (UP). Players named to the first team by both the AP and UP are listed below in bold.

== All-Atlantic Coast selections ==
=== Ends ===
- **Buddy Bass**, Duke (AP-1, UP-1)
- Buddy Frick, South Carolina (AP-1, UP-2)
- John Collar, NC State (AP-2, UP-1)
- Julius Derrick, South Carolina (AP-2)
- Fred Polzer, Virginia (UP-2)

=== Tackles ===
- **Mike Sandusky**, Maryland (AP-1, UP-1)
- **Sid DeLoath**, Duke (AP-1, UP-1)
- John Szuchan, NC State (AP-2, UP-2)
- Dick Maraza, Clemson (AP-2)
- Sam DeLuca, South Carolina (UP-2)

=== Guards ===
- **Jack Davis**, Maryland (AP-1, UP-1)
- Jim Jones, North Carolina (AP-1, UP-2)
- John Grdijan, Clemson (AP-2, UP-1)
- Don Kemper, North Carolina (AP-2)
- Bo Claxton, Wake Forest (UP-2)

=== Centers ===
- Gene Alderton, Maryland (AP-1, UP-2)
- Jim Keyser, Virginia (AP-2, UP-1)
- Eddie Moore, Wake Forest (AP-2)

=== Backs ===
- **Billy Ray Barnes**, Wake Forest (AP-1, UP-1)
- **Joel Wells**, Clemson (AP-1, UP-1)
- Jim Bakhtiar, Virginia (AP-1, UP-2)
- Charlie Bussey, Clemson (AP-1, UP-2)
- Ed Sutton, North Carolina (AP-2, UP-1)
- Sonny Jurgensen, North Carolina (AP-2, UP-1)
- Mackie Prickett, South Carolina (AP-2, UP-2)
- Alex Hawkins, South Carolina (AP-2)
- Hal McElhaney, Duke (UP-2)

== Key ==
AP = Associated Press ACC Regional Board
UP = United Press

== See also ==
- 1956 College Football All-America Team
