= 1955 Davidson Wildcats football team =

American college football season

1955 Davidson Wildcats football
- Conference: Southern Conference
- Record: 5–4 (3–2 SoCon)
- Head coach: Bill Dole (4th season)
- Home stadium: Richardson Stadium

1955 Southern Conference football standings
	Conf.					Overall
Team	W		L		T	W		L		T
No. 19 West Virginia $	4	–	0	–	0	8	–	2	–	0
VPI	2	–	1	–	1	6	–	3	–	1
Davidson	3	–	2	–	0	5	–	4	–	0
George Washington	3	–	2	–	0	5	–	4	–	0
Richmond	3	–	2	–	2	4	–	3	–	2
The Citadel	2	–	2	–	0	5	–	4	–	0
Furman	1	–	1	–	0	1	–	9	–	0
William & Mary	1	–	3	–	1	1	–	7	–	1
VMI	1	–	6	–	0	1	–	9	–	0
Washington and Lee	0	–	1	–	0	0	–	7	–	0
$ – Conference champion; Rankings from AP Poll

The 1955 Davidson Wildcats football team was an American football team that represented Davidson College as a member of the Southern Conference (SoCon) during the 1955 college football season. Led by fourth-year head coach Bill Dole, the Wildcats compiled an overall record of 5–4 with a mark of 3–2 in conference play, tying for third place in the SoCon.

== Schedule ==
Date	Time	Opponent	Site	Result	Attendance	Source
September 16		vs. Catawba*	American Legion Memorial Stadium; Charlotte, NC	W 26–0		
October 1		The Citadel	Richardson Stadium; Davidson, NC	W 6–2		
October 8		Presbyterian*	Richardson Stadium; Davidson, NC	L 7–16		
October 15		Washington and Lee^{†}	Richardson Stadium; Davidson, NC	W 54–0	7,000	
October 22		at VMI	Alumni Field; Lexington, VA	W 21–7	2,500	
October 29		at Stetson*	DeLand Municipal Stadium; DeLand, FL	W 25–13		
November 5		at Richmond	City Stadium; Richmond, VA	L 0–19	5,000	
November 12		Wofford*	Richardson Stadium; Davidson, NC	L 9–21	4,500	
November 19	2:00 p.m.	at Furman	Sirrine Stadium; Greenville, SC	L 9–13	3,000	
*Non-conference game; ^{†}Homecoming; All times are in Eastern time
