= Homer Hobbs =

American football player and coach (1923–1997)

- Homer Hobbs in 1949

No. 37
- Position: Guard

Personal information
- Born: February 13, 1923; Lexington, South Carolina, U.S.
- Died: January 5, 1997 (aged 73); Austell, Georgia, U.S.
- Listed height: 5 ft 11 in (1.80 m)
- Listed weight: 210 lb (95 kg)

Career information
- High school: Lexington
- College: Georgia (1946–1948)
- NFL draft: 1949: 11th round, 108th overall pick

Career history

Playing
- San Francisco 49ers (1949–1950)

Coaching
- Furman (1955–1957) Head coach

Career NFL/AAFC statistics
- Games played: 22
- Games started: 12
- Stats at Pro Football Reference

Head coaching record
- Career: 6–24 (.200)

Homer Brown Hobbs (February 13, 1923 – January 5, 1997) was an American football player and coach. He played professionally as a guard for the San Francisco 49ers of the All-America Football Conference (AAFC) and National Football League (NFL).

== Biography ==
Homer Hobbs was born February 13, 1923, in Lexington, South Carolina.

Hobbs played college football as a lineman at the University of Georgia, lettering in 1946, 1947 and 1948, and was drafted in the 11th round of the 1949 NFL draft by the Washington Redskins with the 108th pick overall.

Hobbs played for the San Francisco 49ers in 1949 — the last year of the All-America Football Conference (AAFC) and 1950 — the first year of the team's membership in the National Football League (NFL).

In 1951, he joined Ralph Jordan's staff as a line coach at Auburn University. On January 28, 1952, Hobbs resigned from Auburn to accept an assistant coaching position at the United States Naval Academy, rejoining Eddie Erdelatz, who was his 49ers line coach. From 1955 to 1957 Hobbs was head football coach at Furman University. He was succeeded at Furman by Bob King for the 1958 season.

Hobbs died January 5, 1997, at Austell, Georgia.

== Head coaching record ==
| Year | Team | Overall | Conference | Standing | Bowl/playoffs |
|---|---|---|---|---|---|
Furman Paladins (Southern Conference) (1955–1957)
| 1955 | Furman | 1–9 | 1–1 | T–6th | |
| 1956 | Furman | 2–8 | 2–2 | T–4th | |
| 1957 | Furman | 3–7 | 2–1 | 4th | |
| Furman: | | 6–24 | 4–4 | | |
| Total: | | 6–24 | | | |
