= 1956 Davidson Wildcats football team =

American college football season

1956 Davidson Wildcats football
- Conference: Southern Conference
- Record: 5–3–1 (2–2–1 SoCon)
- Head coach: Bill Dole (5th season)
- Home stadium: Richardson Stadium

1956 Southern Conference football standings
	Conf.					Overall
Team	W		L		T	W		L		T
West Virginia $	5	–	0	–	0	6	–	4	–	0
VPI	3	–	0	–	0	7	–	2	–	1
No. 17 George Washington	5	–	1	–	0	8	–	1	–	1
Davidson	2	–	2	–	1	5	–	3	–	1
Furman	2	–	2	–	0	2	–	8	–	0
VMI	2	–	3	–	1	3	–	6	–	1
Richmond	2	–	5	–	0	4	–	5	–	0
The Citadel	1	–	3	–	0	3	–	5	–	1
Washington and Lee	0	–	1	–	0	1	–	7	–	0
William & Mary	0	–	5	–	0	0	–	9	–	1
$ – Conference champion; Rankings from AP Poll

The 1956 Davidson Wildcats football team represented Davidson College as a member of the Southern Conference (SoCon) during the 1956 college football season. Led by fifth-year head coach Bill Dole, the Wildcats compiled an overall record of 5–3–1 with a mark of 2–2–1 in conference play, tying for fourth place in the SoCon.

== Schedule ==
Date	Opponent	Site	Result	Attendance	Source
September 21	vs. Catawba*	American Legion Memorial Stadium; Charlotte, NC	W 20–6	4,000	
September 29	at The Citadel	Johnson Hagood Stadium; Charleston, SC	L 7–34	12,700	
October 6	at Presbyterian*	Bailey Stadium; Clinton, SC	W 26–6	3,000	
October 13	at Washington and Lee	Wilson Field; Lexington, VA	W 48–6		
October 20	Stetson*	Richardson Stadium; Davidson, NC	W 43–7		
October 27	VMI	Richardson Stadium; Davidson, NC	T 13–13	5,000	
November 3	Richmond	Richardson Stadium; Davidson, NC	W 7–0		
November 10	at Wofford*	Snyder Field; Spartanburg, SC	L 14–27	4,500	
November 23	vs. Furman	American Legion Memorial Stadium; Charlotte, NC	L 13–27	1,600	
*Non-conference game
