= 1955 William & Mary Indians football team =

American college football season

1955 William & Mary Indians football
- Conference: Southern Conference
- Record: 1–7–1 (1–3–1 SoCon)
- Head coach: Jack Freeman (4th season)
- Captains: Al Grieco; Bill Marfizo
- Home stadium: Cary Field

1955 Southern Conference football standings
	Conf.					Overall
Team	W		L		T	W		L		T
No. 19 West Virginia $	4	–	0	–	0	8	–	2	–	0
VPI	2	–	1	–	1	6	–	3	–	1
Davidson	3	–	2	–	0	5	–	4	–	0
George Washington	3	–	2	–	0	5	–	4	–	0
Richmond	3	–	2	–	2	4	–	3	–	2
The Citadel	2	–	2	–	0	5	–	4	–	0
Furman	1	–	1	–	0	1	–	9	–	0
William & Mary	1	–	3	–	1	1	–	7	–	1
VMI	1	–	6	–	0	1	–	9	–	0
Washington and Lee	0	–	1	–	0	0	–	7	–	0
$ – Conference champion; Rankings from AP Poll

The 1955 William & Mary Indians football team represented the College of William & Mary as a member of the Southern Conference (SoCon) during the 1955 college football season. Led by fourth-year head coach Jack Freeman the Indians compiled an overall record of 1–7–1 with a mark of 1–3–1 in conference play, and finished eighth in the SoCon. William & Mary played home games at Cary Field in Williamsburg, Virginia.

== Schedule ==
Date	Time	Opponent	Site	Result	Attendance	Source
September 24		at No. 9 Navy*	Thompson Stadium; Annapolis, MD	L 0–7	14,000	
October 1		VPI	Cary Field; Williamsburg, VA	L 7–14	12,000+	
October 8	2:30 p.m.	at No. 13 Duke*	Duke Stadium; Durham, NC	L 7–47	15,000	
October 15		at No. 10 West Virginia	Mountaineer Field; Morgantown, WV	L 13–39	22,000	
October 22		George Washington	Cary Field; Williamsburg, VA	L 0–16	4,000	
October 29		VMI	Cary Field; Williamsburg, VA (rivalry)	W 20–13	10,000	
November 5		at Wake Forest*	Groves Stadium; Wake Forest, NC	L 7–13	4,500	
November 19		at NC State*	Riddick Stadium; Raleigh, NC	L 21–28	9,000	
November 24		at Richmond	City Stadium; Richmond, VA (rivalry)	T 6–6	11,000	
*Non-conference game; Rankings from AP Poll released prior to the game

== NFL draft selections ==
Year	Round	Pick	Overall	Name	Team	Position
1956	6	1	62	Bob Lusk	Detroit Lions	Center
1956	14	12	169	Charlie Sidwell	Cleveland Browns	Back
