= 1955 VMI Keydets football team =

American college football season

1955 VMI Keydets football
- Conference: Southern Conference
- Record: 1–9 (1–6 SoCon)
- Head coach: John McKenna (3rd season)
- Home stadium: Wilson Field; Alumni Field

1955 Southern Conference football standings
	Conf.					Overall
Team	W		L		T	W		L		T
No. 19 West Virginia $	4	–	0	–	0	8	–	2	–	0
VPI	2	–	1	–	1	6	–	3	–	1
Davidson	3	–	2	–	0	5	–	4	–	0
George Washington	3	–	2	–	0	5	–	4	–	0
Richmond	3	–	2	–	2	4	–	3	–	2
The Citadel	2	–	2	–	0	5	–	4	–	0
Furman	1	–	1	–	0	1	–	9	–	0
William & Mary	1	–	3	–	1	1	–	7	–	1
VMI	1	–	6	–	0	1	–	9	–	0
Washington and Lee	0	–	1	–	0	0	–	7	–	0
$ – Conference champion; Rankings from AP Poll

The 1955 VMI Keydets football team was an American football team that represented the Virginia Military Institute (VMI) during the 1955 college football season as a member of the Southern Conference. In their third year under head coach John McKenna, the team compiled an overall record of 1–9.

== Schedule ==
Date	Time	Opponent	Site	Result	Attendance	Source
September 17		at Tulane*	Tulane Stadium; New Orleans, LA	L 7–20		
September 24		vs. George Washington	Victory Stadium; Roanoke, VA	L 6–25	8,000	
October 1		Richmond	Wilson Field; Lexington, VA	L 0–21	4,000	
October 8	1:45 p.m.	vs. No. 11 West Virginia	Mitchell Stadium; Bluefield, WV	L 12–47	11,000	
October 15		at Virginia*	Scott Stadium; Charlottesville, VA	L 13–20	16,000	
October 22		Davidson	Alumni Field; Lexington, VA	L 7–21	2,500	
October 29		at William & Mary	Cary Field; Williamsburg, VA (rivalry)	L 13–20	10,000	
November 5		at Lehigh*	Taylor Stadium; Bethlehem, PA	L 0–39	5,000	
November 12		at The Citadel	Johnson Hagood Stadium; Charleston, SC (rivalry)	W 14–7	11,000	
November 24		vs. VPI	Victory Stadium; Roanoke, VA (rivalry)	L 13–39	24,000	
*Non-conference game; Rankings from AP Poll released prior to the game
