= 1956 Furman Purple Hurricane football team =

American college football season

1956 Furman Purple Hurricane football
- Conference: Southern Conference
- Record: 2–8 (2–2 SoCon)
- Head coach: Homer Hobbs (2nd season)
- Captain: Bobby Jennings
- Home stadium: Sirrine Stadium

1956 Southern Conference football standings
| | Conf. | | | | | Overall |
| Team | W | | L | | T | W | | L | | T |
|---|---|---|---|---|---|---|---|---|---|---|
| West Virginia $ | 5 | – | 0 | – | 0 | 6 | – | 4 | – | 0 |
| VPI | 3 | – | 0 | – | 0 | 7 | – | 2 | – | 1 |
| No. 17 George Washington | 5 | – | 1 | – | 0 | 8 | – | 1 | – | 1 |
| Davidson | 2 | – | 2 | – | 1 | 5 | – | 3 | – | 1 |
| Furman | 2 | – | 2 | – | 0 | 2 | – | 8 | – | 0 |
| VMI | 2 | – | 3 | – | 1 | 3 | – | 6 | – | 1 |
| Richmond | 2 | – | 5 | – | 0 | 4 | – | 5 | – | 0 |
| The Citadel | 1 | – | 3 | – | 0 | 3 | – | 5 | – | 1 |
| Washington and Lee | 0 | – | 1 | – | 0 | 1 | – | 7 | – | 0 |
| William & Mary | 0 | – | 5 | – | 0 | 0 | – | 9 | – | 1 |
$ – Conference champion; Rankings from AP Poll

The 1956 Furman Purple Hurricane football team was an American football team that represented Furman University as a member of the Southern Conference (SoCon) during the 1956 college football season. Led by second-year head coach Homer Hobbs, the Purple Hurricane compiled an overall record of 2–8 with a mark of 2–2 in conference play, placing tied for fourth in the SoCon.

== Schedule ==
| Date | Opponent | Site | Result | Attendance | Source |
|---|---|---|---|---|---|
| September 29 | George Washington | Sirrine Stadium; Greenville, SC | L 0–10 | 6,000 | |
| October 6 | at Auburn* | Cliff Hare Stadium; Auburn, AL | L 0–41 | | |
| October 13 | Wofford* | Sirrine Stadium; Greenville, SC (rivalry) | L 6–18 | 10,000 | |
| October 20 | Newberry* | Sirrine Stadium; Greenville, SC | L 7–13 | 3,000 | |
| October 27 | The Citadel | Sirrine Stadium; Greenville, SC (rivalry) | W 7–0 | 6,000 | |
| November 3 | South Carolina* | Sirrine Stadium; Greenville, SC | L 6–13 | | |
| November 10 | at Florida State* | Doak Campbell Stadium; Tallahassee, FL | L 7–42 | 9,000 | |
| November 17 | at West Virginia | Mountaineer Field; Morgantown, WV | L 0–7 | 5,000 | |
| November 23 | at Davidson | American Legion Memorial Stadium; Charlotte, NC | W 27–13 | 1,600 | |
| December 1 | at Clemson* | Memorial Stadium; Clemson, SC | L 7–28 | | |
*Non-conference game
