= 1956 VPI Gobblers football team =

American college football season

1956 VPI Gobblers football
- Conference: Southern Conference
- Record: 7–2–1 (3–0 SoCon)
- Head coach: Frank Moseley (6th season)
- Home stadium: Miles Stadium

1956 Southern Conference football standings
	Conf.					Overall
Team	W		L		T	W		L		T
West Virginia $	5	–	0	–	0	6	–	4	–	0
VPI	3	–	0	–	0	7	–	2	–	1
No. 17 George Washington	5	–	1	–	0	8	–	1	–	1
Davidson	2	–	2	–	1	5	–	3	–	1
Furman	2	–	2	–	0	2	–	8	–	0
VMI	2	–	3	–	1	3	–	6	–	1
Richmond	2	–	5	–	0	4	–	5	–	0
The Citadel	1	–	3	–	0	3	–	5	–	1
Washington and Lee	0	–	1	–	0	1	–	7	–	0
William & Mary	0	–	5	–	0	0	–	9	–	1
$ – Conference champion; Rankings from AP Poll

The 1956 VPI Gobblers football team represented the Virginia Polytechnic Institute or VPI (now known as Virginia Polytechnic Institute and State University or Virginia Tech) as a member of the Southern Conference (SoCon) during the 1956 college football season. Led by sixth-year head coach Frank Moseley the Gobblers compiled an overall record of 7–2–1 with a mark of 3–0 in conference play, and finished second in the SoCon. VPI played home games at Miles Stadium in Blacksburg, Virginia.

== Schedule ==
Date	Time	Opponent	Rank	Site	Result	Attendance	Source
September 15	8:00 p.m.	vs. East Carolina*		Mitchell Stadium; Bluefield, WV	W 37–2	6,000	
September 22		at Tulane*		Tulane Stadium; New Orleans, LA	L 14–21	30,000	
September 29	2:00 p.m.	vs. No. 20 NC State*		Foreman Field; Norfolk, VA	W 35–6	10,000	
October 6	8:00 p.m.	at Florida State*		Doak Campbell Stadium; Tallahassee, FL	W 20–7		
October 13		William & Mary^{†}		Miles Stadium; Blacksburg, VA	W 34–7	12,000	
October 20	2:30 p.m.	at Richmond	No. 18	City Stadium; Richmond, VA	W 46–14		
October 27		vs. Virginia*	No. 16	Victory Stadium; Roanoke, VA (rivalry)	W 14–7	16,000	
November 3	2:00 p.m.	at No. 13 Clemson*	No. 15	Memorial Stadium; Clemson, SC	L 6–21	23,000	
November 10		Wake Forest*		Miles Stadium; Blacksburg, VA	T 13–13	7,000	
November 22		vs. VMI		Victory Stadium; Roanoke, VA (rivalry)	W 45–0	24,000	
*Non-conference game; ^{†}Homecoming; Rankings from AP Poll released prior to the game; All times are in Eastern time

== Rankings ==
Ranking movements Legend: ██ Increase in ranking ██ Decrease in ranking — = Not ranked
	Week											
Poll	Pre	1	2	3	4	5	6	7	8	9	10	Final
AP	—	—	—	—	18	16	15	—	—	—	—	—

== Roster ==
The following players were members of the 1956 football team according to the roster published in the 1957 edition of The Bugle, the Virginia Tech yearbook.

VPI 1956 roster
Quarterbacks: Raymond Donald Divers; Frank H. Eastman; Billy Holsclaw; Jim Lugar; Bob McCoy; Guards: Warren Leroy Belcher; James Alexander Burks; Pat Luis Carpenito; Bill Daley; James Holloway; Bernard Frank Schmidt; Tackles: Robert J. Cruickshank; Thomas John Dalzell; Russell Sidney Moon; Ted Uzelac	Centers: John Rufus Hall; Hillmer John "Swede" Olson; Frank Webster; Ends: Ed Brinkley; Carroll Dale; James Lupton Hedrick; Grover Cleveland Jones III; Nicholas M. Mihalas; John Stewart Moody; Billy Tilling; Halfbacks: Corbin Bailey; Hugh David Ebert; Ray England; Barry Frazee; Harry Keast; Dick Ringer; Jay N. Whitesell; Bobby Wolfenden	Fullbacks: Bobby Conner; Jim Randall; Albert Sebest; Substitutes: Tom Betz; William C. Cranwell; Charles Cuba; John Herndon; William Edward Jamerson; Kuruc; Doug Mullins; Bobby Seal; Ronnie Settles

== Coaching staff ==
The following coaches were members of the 1956 football team according to the roster published in the 1957 edition of The Bugle.

VPI 1956 coaches' roster
Head coach: Frank Moseley; Assistant coach: Buck Chapman; Macauley McEver; George Preas; Alf Satterfield	Trainer: Ed Motley; Equipment Manager: Luke Lindon
