= 1956 William & Mary Indians football team =

American college football season

1956 William & Mary Indians football
- Conference: Southern Conference
- Record: 0–9–1 (0–5 SoCon)
- Head coach: Jack Freeman (5th season)
- Captain: Jack Yohe
- Home stadium: Cary Field

1956 Southern Conference football standings
| | Conf. | | | | | Overall |
| Team | W | | L | | T | W | | L | | T |
|---|---|---|---|---|---|---|---|---|---|---|
| West Virginia $ | 5 | – | 0 | – | 0 | 6 | – | 4 | – | 0 |
| VPI | 3 | – | 0 | – | 0 | 7 | – | 2 | – | 1 |
| No. 17 George Washington | 5 | – | 1 | – | 0 | 8 | – | 1 | – | 1 |
| Davidson | 2 | – | 2 | – | 1 | 5 | – | 3 | – | 1 |
| Furman | 2 | – | 2 | – | 0 | 2 | – | 8 | – | 0 |
| VMI | 2 | – | 3 | – | 1 | 3 | – | 6 | – | 1 |
| Richmond | 2 | – | 5 | – | 0 | 4 | – | 5 | – | 0 |
| The Citadel | 1 | – | 3 | – | 0 | 3 | – | 5 | – | 1 |
| Washington and Lee | 0 | – | 1 | – | 0 | 1 | – | 7 | – | 0 |
| William & Mary | 0 | – | 5 | – | 0 | 0 | – | 9 | – | 1 |
$ – Conference champion; Rankings from AP Poll

The 1956 William & Mary Indians football team represented the College of William & Mary as a member of the Southern Conference (SoCon) during the 1956 college football season. Led by fifth-year head coach Jack Freeman the Indians compiled an overall record of 0–9–1 with a mark of 0–5 in conference play, and finished tenth in the SoCon. William & Mary played home games at Cary Field in Williamsburg, Virginia.

== Schedule ==
| Date | Opponent | Site | Result | Attendance | Source |
|---|---|---|---|---|---|
| September 22 | Wake Forest* | Cary Field; Williamsburg, VA | L 0–39 | 8,500 | |
| September 29 | at Navy* | Thompson Stadium; Annapolis, MD | L 14–39 | 14,051 | |
| October 6 | Boston University* | Cary Field; Williamsburg, VA | T 18–18 | | |
| October 13 | at VPI | Miles Stadium; Blacksburg, VA | L 7–34 | 12,000 | |
| October 20 | West Virginia | Cary Field; Williamsburg, VA | L 13–20 | 10,000 | |
| October 26 | at No. 17 George Washington | Griffith Stadium; Washington, DC | L 14–16 | 6,000 | |
| November 3 | vs. VMI | City Stadium; Lynchburg, VA (rivalry) | L 6–20 | 5,000 | |
| November 10 | at Army* | Michie Stadium; West Point, NY | L 6–34 | 16,835 | |
| November 17 | at Rutgers* | Rutgers Stadium; Piscataway, NJ | L 6–20 | 3,000 | |
| November 22 | at Richmond | City Stadium; Richmond, VA (rivalry) | L 0–6 | 5,000 | |
*Non-conference game; Rankings from AP Poll released prior to the game
