= 1956 Washington and Lee Generals football team =

American college football season

1956 Washington and Lee Generals football
- Conference: Southern Conference
- Record: 1–7 (0–1 SoCon)
- Head coach: Bill Chipley (2nd season)
- Home stadium: Wilson Field

1956 Southern Conference football standings
	Conf.					Overall
Team	W		L		T	W		L		T
West Virginia $	5	–	0	–	0	6	–	4	–	0
VPI	3	–	0	–	0	7	–	2	–	1
No. 17 George Washington	5	–	1	–	0	8	–	1	–	1
Davidson	2	–	2	–	1	5	–	3	–	1
Furman	2	–	2	–	0	2	–	8	–	0
VMI	2	–	3	–	1	3	–	6	–	1
Richmond	2	–	5	–	0	4	–	5	–	0
The Citadel	1	–	3	–	0	3	–	5	–	1
Washington and Lee	0	–	1	–	0	1	–	7	–	0
William & Mary	0	–	5	–	0	0	–	9	–	1
$ – Conference champion; Rankings from AP Poll

The 1956 Washington and Lee Generals football team was an American football team that represented the Washington and Lee University as a member of the Southern Conference (SoCon) during the 1956 college football season. Led by second-year head coach Bill Chipley, the Generals compiled an overall record of 1–7 with a mark of 0–1 in conference play, and finished ninth in the SoCon.

== Schedule ==
Date	Opponent	Site	Result	Attendance	Source
October 6	at Centre*	Farris Stadium; Danville, KY	L 6–14		
October 13	Davidson	Wilson Field; Lexington, VA	L 6–48		
October 20	at Southwestern (TN)*	Fargason Field; Memphis, TN	L 0–42		
October 27	at West Virginia Tech*	Montgomery, WV	L 20–21		
November 3	at Wabash*	Crawfordsville, IN	L 0–34		
November 10	Sewanee*^{†}	Wilson Field; Lexington, VA	W 22–7	2,000	
November 17	Hampden–Sydney*	Wilson Field; Lexington, VA	L 0–12	500	
November 22	at Washington University*	Francis Field; St. Louis, MO	L 19–40	6,000	
*Non-conference game; ^{†}Homecoming
