= 1956 The Citadel Bulldogs football team =

American college football season

1956 The Citadel Bulldogs football
- Conference: Southern Conference
- Record: 3–5–1 (1–3 SoCon)
- Head coach: John Sauer (2nd season)
- Home stadium: Johnson Hagood Stadium

1956 Southern Conference football standings
	Conf.					Overall
Team	W		L		T	W		L		T
West Virginia $	5	–	0	–	0	6	–	4	–	0
VPI	3	–	0	–	0	7	–	2	–	1
No. 17 George Washington	5	–	1	–	0	8	–	1	–	1
Davidson	2	–	2	–	1	5	–	3	–	1
Furman	2	–	2	–	0	2	–	8	–	0
VMI	2	–	3	–	1	3	–	6	–	1
Richmond	2	–	5	–	0	4	–	5	–	0
The Citadel	1	–	3	–	0	3	–	5	–	1
Washington and Lee	0	–	1	–	0	1	–	7	–	0
William & Mary	0	–	5	–	0	0	–	9	–	1
$ – Conference champion; Rankings from AP Poll

The 1956 The Citadel Bulldogs football team represented The Citadel, The Military College of South Carolina in the 1956 college football season. John Sauer served as head coach for the second season. The Bulldogs played as members of the Southern Conference and played home games at Johnson Hagood Stadium.

== Schedule ==
Date	Opponent	Site	Result	Attendance	Source
September 22	Newberry*	Johnson Hagood Stadium; Charleston, SC	T 20–20	14,000	
September 29	Davidson	Johnson Hagood Stadium; Charleston, SC	W 34–7	12,700	
October 6	Stetson*	Johnson Hagood Stadium; Charleston, SC	W 40–6	11,000	
October 12	at No. 17 Richmond	City Stadium; Richmond, VA	L 3–7		
October 19	vs. Wofford*	County Fairgrounds; Orangeburg, SC (rivalry)	L 19–23	9,000	
October 27	at Furman	Sirrine Stadium; Greenville, SC (rivalry)	L 0–7	6,000	
November 3	Presbyterian*^{†}	Johnson Hagood Stadium; Charleston, SC	W 20–13	11,500	
November 10	at Villanova*	Villanova Stadium; Philadelphia, PA	L 0–46	7,500	
November 17	George Washington	Johnson Hagood Stadium; Charleston, SC	L 0–20	8,500	
*Non-conference game; ^{†}Homecoming; Rankings from Coaches' Poll released prior to the game
