= 1955 South Carolina Gamecocks football team =

American college football season

1955 South Carolina Gamecocks football
- Conference: Atlantic Coast Conference
- Record: 3–6 (1–5 ACC)
- Head coach: Rex Enright (15th season)
- Captains: Carl Brazell; Hugh Bell
- Home stadium: Carolina Stadium

1955 Atlantic Coast Conference football standings
	Conf.					Overall
Team	W		L		T	W		L		T
No. 3 Maryland +	4	–	0	–	0	10	–	1	–	0
Duke +	4	–	0	–	0	7	–	2	–	1
Clemson	3	–	1	–	0	7	–	3	–	0
Wake Forest	3	–	3	–	1	5	–	4	–	1
North Carolina	3	–	3	–	0	3	–	7	–	0
NC State	0	–	2	–	1	4	–	5	–	1
South Carolina	1	–	5	–	0	3	–	6	–	0
Virginia	0	–	4	–	0	1	–	9	–	0
+ – Conference co-champions; Rankings from AP poll

The 1955 South Carolina Gamecocks football team represented the University of South Carolina as a member of the Atlantic Coast Conference (ACC) during the 1955 college football season. Led by Rex Enright in his 15th and final season as head coach, the Gamecocks compiled an overall record of 3–6 with a mark of 1–5 in conference play, tying for sixth place in the ACC. The team played home games at Carolina Stadium in Columbia, South Carolina.

== Schedule ==
Date	Opponent	Site	Result	Attendance	Source
September 17	Wofford*	Carolina Stadium; Columbia, SC	W 26–7	15,000	
September 24	vs. Wake Forest	Bowman Gray Stadium; Winston-Salem, NC	L 19–34	11,000	
October 1	No. 15 Navy*	Carolina Stadium; Columbia, SC	L 0–26	28,000	
October 8	Furman*	Carolina Stadium; Columbia, SC	W 19–0	15,000	
October 20	Clemson	Carolina Stadium; Columbia, SC (rivalry)	L 14–28	35,000	
October 29	at No. 1 Maryland	Byrd Stadium; College Park, MD	L 0–27	25,000	
November 5	vs. North Carolina	Foreman Field; Norfolk, VA (Oyster Bowl, rivalry)	L 14–32	25,000	
November 12	No. 18 Duke	Carolina Stadium; Columbia, SC	L 7–41	18,000	
November 26	at Virginia	Scott Stadium; Charlottesville, VA	W 21–14	9,000	
*Non-conference game; Rankings from AP Poll released prior to the game
