= 1955 VPI Gobblers football team =

American college football season

1955 VPI Gobblers football
- Conference: Southern Conference
- Record: 6–3–1 (2–1–1 SoCon)
- Head coach: Frank Moseley (5th season)
- Home stadium: Miles Stadium

1955 Southern Conference football standings
	Conf.					Overall
Team	W		L		T	W		L		T
No. 19 West Virginia $	4	–	0	–	0	8	–	2	–	0
VPI	2	–	1	–	1	6	–	3	–	1
Davidson	3	–	2	–	0	5	–	4	–	0
George Washington	3	–	2	–	0	5	–	4	–	0
Richmond	3	–	2	–	2	4	–	3	–	2
The Citadel	2	–	2	–	0	5	–	4	–	0
Furman	1	–	1	–	0	1	–	9	–	0
William & Mary	1	–	3	–	1	1	–	7	–	1
VMI	1	–	6	–	0	1	–	9	–	0
Washington and Lee	0	–	1	–	0	0	–	7	–	0
$ – Conference champion; Rankings from AP Poll

The 1955 VPI Gobblers football team represented the Virginia Polytechnic Institute or VPI (now known as Virginia Polytechnic Institute and State University or Virginia Tech) as a member of the Southern Conference (SoCon) during the 1955 college football season. Led by fifth-year head coach Frank Moseley the Gobblers compiled an overall record of 6–3–1 with a mark of 2–1–1 in conference play, and finished second in the SoCon. VPI played home games at Miles Stadium in Blacksburg, Virginia.

== Schedule ==
Date	Time	Opponent	Site	Result	Attendance	Source
September 17	2:30 p.m.	at Wake Forest*	Groves Stadium; Wake Forest, NC	L 0–13	7,500	
September 24		at Penn*	Franklin Field; Philadelphia, PA	W 33–0	12,751	
October 1		at William & Mary	Cary Field; Williamsburg, VA	W 14–7	12,000+	
October 8	8:00 p.m.	at Florida State*	Doak Campbell Stadium; Tallahassee, FL	W 24–20		
October 15		Richmond	Miles Stadium; Blacksburg, VA	T 7–7	8,000	
October 22		vs. Virginia*	Victory Stadium; Roanoke, VA (rivalry)	W 17–13	15,000	
October 29		George Washington^{†}	Miles Stadium; Blacksburg, VA	L 7–13	10,000	
November 5		vs. Clemson*	Victory Stadium; Roanoke, VA	L 16–21	8,000	
November 12	2:00 p.m.	vs. NC State*	Mitchell Stadium; Bluefield, WV	W 34–26	6,000	
November 24		vs. VMI	Victory Stadium; Roanoke, VA (rivalry)	W 39–13	24,000	
*Non-conference game; ^{†}Homecoming; All times are in Eastern time

== Roster ==
The following players were members of the 1955 football team according to the roster published in the 1956 edition of The Bugle, the Virginia Tech yearbook.

VPI 1955 roster
Jack Allen; Corbin Bailey; Richard VanMetre "Dickie" Beard (Capt.); Tom Betz; Ed Brinkley; Franklin Dewey Brown; Leo Burke; Hayes Howell Burleson; Pat Luis Carpenito; Bobby Conner; William C. Cranwell; Robert J. Cruickshank; Charles Cuba; Bill Daley	Thomas John Dalzell; Raymond Donald Divers; Hugh David Ebert; Ray England; Barry Frazee; Ed Gentry; John Rufus Hall; James Lupton Hedrick; John Herndon; William Edward Jamerson; Grover Cleveland Jones III; James Patrick Locke; Jim Lugar; Bob McCoy	Russell Sidney Moon; Doug Mullins; Hillmer John "Swede" Olson; Jack Warren Prater; Thomas Carl Richards; Bernard Frank Schmidt; Robert Earl Scruggs; Bobby Seal; Roger Winfield Simmons; Billy Tilling; Phillip William Unger; Frank Webster; Bobby Wolfenden
