= 1955 North Carolina Tar Heels football team =

American college football season

1955 North Carolina Tar Heels football
- Conference: Atlantic Coast Conference
- Record: 3–7 (3–3 ACC)
- Head coach: George T. Barclay (3rd season)
- Captains: Will Frye; Roland Perdue
- Home stadium: Kenan Memorial Stadium

1955 Atlantic Coast Conference football standings
| | Conf. | | | | | Overall |
| Team | W | | L | | T | W | | L | | T |
|---|---|---|---|---|---|---|---|---|---|---|
| No. 3 Maryland + | 4 | – | 0 | – | 0 | 10 | – | 1 | – | 0 |
| Duke + | 4 | – | 0 | – | 0 | 7 | – | 2 | – | 1 |
| Clemson | 3 | – | 1 | – | 0 | 7 | – | 3 | – | 0 |
| Wake Forest | 3 | – | 3 | – | 1 | 5 | – | 4 | – | 1 |
| North Carolina | 3 | – | 3 | – | 0 | 3 | – | 7 | – | 0 |
| NC State | 0 | – | 2 | – | 1 | 4 | – | 5 | – | 1 |
| South Carolina | 1 | – | 5 | – | 0 | 3 | – | 6 | – | 0 |
| Virginia | 0 | – | 4 | – | 0 | 1 | – | 9 | – | 0 |
+ – Conference co-champions; Rankings from AP poll

The 1955 North Carolina Tar Heels football team represented the University of North Carolina at Chapel Hill during the 1955 college football season. The Tar Heels were led by third-year head coach George T. Barclay, and played their home games at Kenan Memorial Stadium. The team competed as a member of the Atlantic Coast Conference, finishing in fifth.

Following the conclusion of the season, Barclay's coaching contract expired and was not renewed by UNC. He did not produce a winning season in his three years as head coach, finishing with an overall record of 11–18–1.

== Schedule ==
| Date | Time | Opponent | Site | Result | Attendance | Source |
|---|---|---|---|---|---|---|
| September 24 | 2:00 p.m. | No. 3 Oklahoma* | Kenan Memorial Stadium; Chapel Hill, NC | L 6–13 | 26,638 | |
| October 1 | 2:00 p.m. | at NC State | Riddick Stadium; Raleigh, NC (rivalry) | W 25–18 | 17,000 | |
| October 8 | 2:00 p.m. | at Georgia* | Sanford Stadium; Athens, GA | L 7–28 | 25,000 | |
| October 15 | 2:00 p.m. | No. 2 Maryland^{†} | Kenan Memorial Stadium; Chapel Hill, NC | L 7–25 | 30,000 | |
| October 22 | 2:00 p.m. | at Wake Forest | Groves Stadium (I); Wake Forest, NC (rivalry) | L 0–25 | 13,000 | |
| October 29 | 2:00 p.m. | Tennessee* | Kenan Memorial Stadium; Chapel Hill, NC | L 7–48 | 18,000 | |
| November 5 | 2:15 p.m. | vs. South Carolina | Foreman Field; Norfolk, VA (Oyster Bowl, rivalry) | W 32–14 | 25,000 | |
| November 12 | 2:00 p.m. | No. 5 Notre Dame* | Kenan Memorial Stadium; Chapel Hill, NC (rivalry) | L 7–27 | 38,000 | |
| November 19 | 2:00 p.m. | Virginia | Kenan Memorial Stadium; Chapel Hill, NC (South's Oldest Rivalry) | W 26–14 | 9,000 | |
| December 3 | 2:00 p.m. | at No. 18 Duke | Duke Stadium; Durham, NC (Victory Bell) | L 0–6 | 34,000 | |
*Non-conference game; ^{†}Homecoming; Rankings from AP Poll released prior to the game; All times are in Eastern time
