= 1955 NC State Wolfpack football team =

American college football season

1955 NC State Wolfpack football
- Conference: Atlantic Coast Conference
- Record: 4–5–1 (0–2–1 ACC)
- Head coach: Earle Edwards (2nd season)
- Home stadium: Riddick Stadium

1955 Atlantic Coast Conference football standings
	Conf.					Overall
Team	W		L		T	W		L		T
No. 3 Maryland +	4	–	0	–	0	10	–	1	–	0
Duke +	4	–	0	–	0	7	–	2	–	1
Clemson	3	–	1	–	0	7	–	3	–	0
Wake Forest	3	–	3	–	1	5	–	4	–	1
North Carolina	3	–	3	–	0	3	–	7	–	0
NC State	0	–	2	–	1	4	–	5	–	1
South Carolina	1	–	5	–	0	3	–	6	–	0
Virginia	0	–	4	–	0	1	–	9	–	0
+ – Conference co-champions; Rankings from AP poll

The 1955 NC State Wolfpack football team represented North Carolina State University during the 1955 college football season. The Wolfpack were led by second-year head coach Earle Edwards and played their home games at Riddick Stadium in Raleigh, North Carolina. They competed as members of the Atlantic Coast Conference, finishing winless in conference play for the third consecutive year. The Wolfpack's tie against Wake Forest was the school's first non-loss against an ACC opponent.

== Schedule ==
Date	Time	Opponent	Site	Result	Attendance	Source
September 17		at Florida State*	Doak Campbell Stadium; Tallahassee, FL	L 0–7	15,352	
September 24		Duke	Riddick Stadium; Raleigh, NC (rivalry)	L 7–33	20,000	
October 1		North Carolina	Riddick Stadium; Raleigh, NC (rivalry)	L 18–25	17,000	
October 15		Wake Forest	Riddick Stadium; Raleigh, NC (rivalry)	T 13–13	13,000	
October 22		at Villanova*	Villanova Stadium; Villanova, PA	W 34–13	8,783	
October 29		at Furman*	Sirrine Stadium; Greenville, SC	W 33–7		
November 5		at Boston University*	Boston University Field; Boston, MA	W 40–13		
November 12	2:00 p.m.	vs. VPI*	Mitchell Stadium; Bluefield, WV (Coal Bowl)	L 26–34	6,000	
November 19		William & Mary*	Riddick Stadium; Raleigh, NC	W 28–21	9,000	
November 25		West Virginia*	Riddick Stadium; Raleigh, NC	L 7–27	4,500	
*Non-conference game
