= Trout, West Virginia =

- Unincorporated community
- Location within West Virginia Location within the United States
- Coordinates: 38°01′00″N 80°28′04″W
- Country: United States
- State: West Virginia
- County: Greenbrier
- Elevation: 2,264 ft (690 m)
- Time zone: UTC-5 (Eastern (EST))
  - Summer (DST): UTC-4 (EDT)
- Postal code: 24991
- Area codes: 304 & 681
- GNIS feature ID: 1553262

Trout is an unincorporated community in Greenbrier County, West Virginia, United States. Trout is 8 miles (13 km) west-northwest of Falling Spring. Its post office has been closed.
