= 1955 Maryland Terrapins football team =

American college football season

1955 Maryland Terrapins football

ACC co-champion

Orange Bowl, L 6–20 vs. Oklahoma
- Conference: Atlantic Coast Conference

Ranking
- Coaches: No. 3
- AP: No. 3
- Record: 10–1 (4–0 ACC)
- Head coach: Jim Tatum (9th season)
- Offensive scheme: Split-T
- Home stadium: Byrd Stadium

1955 Atlantic Coast Conference football standings
	Conf.					Overall
Team	W		L		T	W		L		T
No. 3 Maryland +	4	–	0	–	0	10	–	1	–	0
Duke +	4	–	0	–	0	7	–	2	–	1
Clemson	3	–	1	–	0	7	–	3	–	0
Wake Forest	3	–	3	–	1	5	–	4	–	1
North Carolina	3	–	3	–	0	3	–	7	–	0
NC State	0	–	2	–	1	4	–	5	–	1
South Carolina	1	–	5	–	0	3	–	6	–	0
Virginia	0	–	4	–	0	1	–	9	–	0
+ – Conference co-champions; Rankings from AP poll

The 1955 Maryland Terrapins football team represented the University of Maryland, College Park in the 1955 college football season as a member of the Atlantic Coast Conference (ACC). Their perfect 10–0 regular season culminated with a bid to the 1956 Orange Bowl, where they faced top-ranked Oklahoma. Maryland lost, 6–20. Maryland's 25–12 victory over Clemson on November 12 was referenced in the 1989 film, Back to the Future Part II, which primarily took place on the same day.

== Schedule ==
Date	Opponent	Rank	Site	Result	Attendance	Source
September 17	at Missouri*	No. 8	Memorial Stadium; Columbia, MO	W 13–12	18,000	
September 24	No. 1 UCLA*	No. 5	Byrd Stadium; College Park, MD	W 7–0	46,000	
October 1	at No. 20 Baylor*	No. 1	Baylor Stadium; Waco, TX	W 20–6	39,000	
October 8	Wake Forest	No. 1	Byrd Stadium; College Park, MD	W 28–7	14,000	
October 15	at North Carolina	No. 2	Kenan Memorial Stadium; Chapel Hill, NC	W 25–7	30,000	
October 22	at Syracuse*	No. 2	Archbold Stadium; Syracuse, NY	W 34–13	32,500	
October 29	South Carolina^{†}	No. 1	Byrd Stadium; College Park, MD	W 27–0	25,000	
November 5	LSU*	No. 1	Byrd Stadium; College Park, MD	W 13–0	28,000	
November 12	at Clemson	No. 2	Memorial Stadium; Clemson, SC	W 25–12	30,000	
November 19	George Washington*	No. 2	Byrd Stadium; College Park, MD	W 19–0	20,000	
January 2	vs. No. 1 Oklahoma*	No. 3	Burdine Stadium; Miami, FL (Orange Bowl)	L 6–20	76,561	
*Non-conference game; ^{†}Homecoming; Rankings from AP Poll released prior to the game
