= Joel Wells =

American football player (1935–2022)

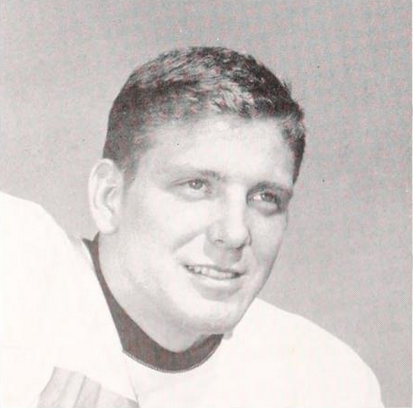
- Wells in 1956

No. 86, 28
- Position: Halfback

Personal information
- Born: November 26, 1935; Columbia, South Carolina, U.S.
- Died: September 4, 2022 (aged 86); Spartanburg, South Carolina, U.S.
- Listed height: 6 ft 1 in (1.85 m)
- Listed weight: 200 lb (91 kg)

Career information
- High school: Dreher (Columbia)
- College: Clemson
- NFL draft: 1957: 2nd round, 18th overall pick

Career history
- Montreal Alouettes (1957-1959); New York Giants (1961)

Awards and highlights
- CFL East All-Star (1958); Third-team All-American (1956); 2× First-team All-ACC (1955, 1956)

Career NFL statistics
- Rushing yards: 216
- Rushing average: 3.3
- Receptions: 6
- Receiving yards: 31
- Total touchdowns: 2
- Stats at Pro Football Reference

Joel Whitlock Wells (November 26, 1935 – September 4, 2022) was an American professional football player. He played as a halfback in the National Football League (NFL) for the New York Giants during the 1961 NFL season. Wells began his career in the Canadian Football League (CFL) in 1957 with the Montreal Alouettes, where he was an All-Star in 1958.

Wells died on September 4, 2022, aged 87.
