= Joe Pagliei =

American football player (born 1934)

No. 32, 40
- Position: Fullback

Personal information
- Born: April 12, 1934 (age 92); Clairton, Pennsylvania, U.S.
- Listed height: 6 ft 0 in (1.83 m)
- Listed weight: 220 lb (100 kg)

Career information
- High school: Clairton
- College: Clemson

Career history
- Calgary Stampeders (1956); Philadelphia Eagles (1957)*; Philadelphia Eagles (1959–1960); New York Titans (1960)
- * Offseason or practice squad member only

Career statistics
- Games Played: 18
- Stats at Pro Football Reference

Joseph Anthony Pagliei (born April 12, 1934) is an American former professional football player who was a fullback with the Philadelphia Eagles of the National Football League (NFL) and New York Titans of the American Football League (AFL). He played college football for the Clemson Tigers. He also played in the Canadian Football League (CFL) for the Calgary Stampeders.
