= Joe Nicely =

American football player (1934–2010)

No. 55
- Position: Offensive guard

Personal information
- Born: November 26, 1934; Trout, West Virginia, U.S.
- Died: September 24, 2010 (aged 75); Glendale, Arizona, U.S.
- Listed height: 6 ft 1 in (1.85 m)
- Listed weight: 230 lb (104 kg)

Career information
- High school: Rupert (WV)
- College: West Virginia
- NFL draft: 1958: 3rd round, 35th overall pick

Career history
- Baltimore Colts (1958)*; Montreal Alouettes (1958); Washington Redskins (1959)*; Dallas Cowboys (1960)*
- * Offseason or practice squad member only

Awards and highlights
- All-SoCon (1956)

Joseph Burel Nicely (November 26, 1934 – September 24, 2010) was an American professional football offensive guard in the Canadian Football League (CFL) for the Montreal Alouettes. He also was a member of the Washington Redskins in the National Football League (NFL). He played college football at West Virginia University.

== Early life ==
Nicely attended Rupert High School. To play football, he had to walk 6 to 8 miles home after each practice.

He accepted a football scholarship from West Virginia University, where he became a starter at offensive guard offense and a middle guard on defense. As a senior, he missed three games with a broken bone in his hand. He participated in the Blue–Gray Football Classic, Senior Bowl and Chicago College All-Star Game.

== Professional career ==
Nicely was selected by the Baltimore Colts in the third round (35th overall) of the 1958 NFL draft. He was waived before the start of the season on September 9.

On September 12, 1958, he signed with the Montreal Alouettes of the Canadian Football League. He appeared in 5 games as a backup at offensive guard and offensive tackle. He was released on October 14.

On January 28, 1959, he signed with the Washington Redskins, where he was tried at center. On September 15, he was placed on the team's reserve list with an injury and was later signed to the taxi squad.

In 1960, Nicely was selected by the Dallas Cowboys in the expansion draft. He suffered from a blood infection that turned out to be Hepatitis C and did not make the team.

== Personal life ==
Nicely had three fingers cut off from his right hand in an accident he had during his youth. He died on September 24, 2008.
