= Dave Liddick =

American football player (1935–2016)

No. 79, 84
- Position: Defensive tackle

Personal information
- Born: December 10, 1935; Harrisburg, Pennsylvania, U.S.
- Died: March 10, 2016 (aged 80); Rock Hill, South Carolina, U.S.
- Listed height: 6 ft 1 in (1.85 m)
- Listed weight: 240 lb (109 kg)

Career information
- High school: Millersburgh (PA)
- College: George Washington
- NFL draft: 1957: 8th round, 95th overall pick

Career history
- Detroit Lions (1957)*; Pittsburgh Steelers (1957); Cleveland Browns (1958)
- * Offseason or practice squad member only
- Stats at Pro Football Reference

David LeRoy Liddick (December 10, 1935 – March 10, 2016) was an American football defensive tackle who played college football for George Washington and professional football in the National Football League (NFL) for the Pittsburgh Steelers (1957) and Cleveland Browns (1958). He appeared in 10 NFL games, three of them as a starter.

== Early life ==
Liddick was born in 1935 in Harrisburg, Pennsylvania, and attended Millersburg High School. He then played college football at George Washington.

== Professional football ==
He was drafted by the Detroit Lions in the eighth round (95th overall pick) in the 1957 NFL draft. He did not appear in any regular season games with the Lions. He spent the 1957 season with the Pittsburgh Steelers, appearing in 10 games, three as a starter. In 1958, he signed with the Cleveland Browns but did not report in order to pursue a coaching career. He became a high school football coach at Donegal High School in Mount Joy, Pennsylvania. He made a comeback attempt in 1960 with the Los Angeles Chargers, but did not appear in any games for the club.

== Later life ==
In later years, Liddick was a distribution manager for Kroger. He died in 2016 at age 80 in Rock Hill, South Carolina.
