= Pat Lamberti =

American football player (1937–2007)

No. 50, 55
- Position: Linebacker

Personal information
- Born: September 1, 1937; Woodbridge Township, New Jersey, U.S.
- Died: December 19, 2007 (aged 70); Kents Store, Virginia, U.S.
- Listed height: 6 ft 2 in (1.88 m)
- Listed weight: 225 lb (102 kg)

Career information
- High school: Woodbridge (NJ)
- College: Richmond
- NFL draft: 1959: 13th round, 146th overall pick

Career history

Playing
- New York Titans (1961); Denver Broncos (1961)

Coaching
- Richmond Rebels (1965) Defensive line coach

Career AFL statistics
- Interceptions: 1
- Stats at Pro Football Reference

Pat Lamberti (September 1, 1937 – December 19. 2007) was an American football linebacker. He played for the New York Titans and Denver Broncos in 1961.
