= 1955 Duke Blue Devils football team =

American college football season

1955 Duke Blue Devils football

ACC co-champion
- Conference: Atlantic Coast Conference

Ranking
- Coaches: No. 16
- Record: 7–2–1 (4–0 ACC)
- Head coach: William D. Murray (5th season)
- MVP: Robert A. Pascal
- Captain: Jesse Birchfield
- Home stadium: Duke Stadium

1955 Atlantic Coast Conference football standings
| | Conf. | | | | | Overall |
| Team | W | | L | | T | W | | L | | T |
|---|---|---|---|---|---|---|---|---|---|---|
| No. 3 Maryland + | 4 | – | 0 | – | 0 | 10 | – | 1 | – | 0 |
| Duke + | 4 | – | 0 | – | 0 | 7 | – | 2 | – | 1 |
| Clemson | 3 | – | 1 | – | 0 | 7 | – | 3 | – | 0 |
| Wake Forest | 3 | – | 3 | – | 1 | 5 | – | 4 | – | 1 |
| North Carolina | 3 | – | 3 | – | 0 | 3 | – | 7 | – | 0 |
| NC State | 0 | – | 2 | – | 1 | 4 | – | 5 | – | 1 |
| South Carolina | 1 | – | 5 | – | 0 | 3 | – | 6 | – | 0 |
| Virginia | 0 | – | 4 | – | 0 | 1 | – | 9 | – | 0 |
+ – Conference co-champions; Rankings from AP poll

The 1955 Duke Blue Devils football team was an American football team that represented Duke University as a member of the Atlantic Coast Conference (ACC) during the 1955 college football season. In their fifth year under head coach William D. Murray, the Blue Devils compiled an overall record of 7–2–1, with a conference record of 4–0, and finished as ACC co-champion.

== Schedule ==
| Date | Time | Opponent | Rank | Site | Result | Attendance | Source |
|---|---|---|---|---|---|---|---|
| September 24 | | NC State | | Duke Stadium; Durham, NC (rivalry) | W 33–7 | 20,000 | |
| October 1 | | at Tennessee* | No. 16 | Shields–Watkins Field; Knoxville, TN | W 21–0 | 25,500 | |
| October 8 | 2:30 p.m. | William & Mary* | No. 13 | Duke Stadium; Durham, NC | W 47–7 | 15,000 | |
| October 15 | | at No. 14 Ohio State* | No. 11 | Ohio Stadium; Columbus, OH | W 20–14 | 82,254 | |
| October 22 | | Pittsburgh*^{†} | No. 5 | Duke Stadium; Durham, NC | L 7–26 | 19,451–31,000 | |
| October 29 | | at No. 12 Georgia Tech* | No. 17 | Grant Field; Atlanta, GA | L 0–27 | 40,000 | |
| November 5 | | vs. No. 9 Navy* | | Memorial Stadium; Baltimore, MD | T 7–7 | 27,119 | |
| November 12 | | at South Carolina | No. 18 | Carolina Stadium; Columbia, SC | W 41–7 | 18,000 | |
| November 19 | | Wake Forest | No. 20 | Duke Stadium; Durham, NC (rivalry) | W 14–0 | 15,000 | |
| December 3 | | North Carolina | No. 18 | Duke Stadium; Durham, NC (Victory Bell) | W 6–0 | 34,000 | |
*Non-conference game; ^{†}Homecoming; Rankings from AP Poll released prior to the game
