= Mike Sommer =

American football player (1934–2022)

No. 21, 27, 26, 29, 28
- Positions: Halfback, defensive back

Personal information
- Born: October 9, 1934; Washington, D.C., U.S.
- Died: April 23, 2022 (aged 87); Dunedin, Florida, U.S.
- Listed height: 5 ft 11 in (1.80 m)
- Listed weight: 190 lb (86 kg)

Career information
- High school: Woodrow Wilson (Washington, D.C.)
- College: George Washington
- NFL draft: 1958: 2nd round, 16th overall pick

Career history
- Washington Redskins (1958–1959); Baltimore Colts (1959–1961); Washington Redskins (1961); San Diego Chargers (1962)*; Oakland Raiders (1963); Virginia Sailors (1966-1968)
- * Offseason or practice squad member only

Awards and highlights
- NFL champion (1959)

Career NFL statistics
- Rushing yards: 253
- Rushing average: 3.2
- Receptions: 9
- Receiving yards: 166
- Total touchdowns: 2
- Stats at Pro Football Reference

Michael Sandor Sommer (October 9, 1934 – April 23, 2022) was an American football player from Washington, D.C. He was selected 16th overall in the second round of the 1958 NFL draft by the Baltimore Colts.

Sommer attended Woodrow Wilson High School in Washington, DC where he was an ALL High running back, leading the Tigers to the Interhigh championship in 1952 scoring 5 TDs against archrival Western. A week later, WW defeated Catholic league champion St Johns for the City title in Griffith Stadium, 24–6. Sommer ran for a 44-yard TD and threw 23 yards for another score. Sommer was also the Interhigh's Sprint champion in track that year.

Sommer played three seasons as a back at George Washington. The team had a combined record of 15-12-1 during Mike's career and defeated UTEP in the 1957 Sun Bowl, 13–0. In 1955 and 1957, Sommer was named in All-Southern Conference first-team and was drafted as the 16th player in the 1958 NFL draft by the hometown Washington Redskins.

Sommer was an American professional football halfback in the National Football League, playing 3 years for the Washington Redskins and 3 years for the Baltimore Colts. He also played 1 year in the American Football League for the Oakland Raiders.

Sommer practiced emergency medicine in Lewes, DE with Beebe Medical Ctr. He received his medical degree from George Washington Univ. Sch. of Med. & Hlth. Sci., Washington DC.

== See also ==
- List of NCAA major college yearly punt and kickoff return leaders
