= Larry Krutko =

American football player (born 1935)

No. 31, 39
- Position: Fullback

Personal information
- Born: June 27, 1935 (age 91); Carmichaels, Pennsylvania, U.S.
- Listed height: 6 ft 0 in (1.83 m)
- Listed weight: 220 lb (100 kg)

Career information
- College: West Virginia
- NFL draft: 1958: 2nd round, 20th overall pick

Career history
- Pittsburgh Steelers (1958–1960)

Career NFL statistics
- Rushing yards: 331
- Rushing average: 3.4
- Receptions: 14
- Receiving yards: 108
- Total touchdowns: 4
- Stats at Pro Football Reference

Larry Krutko (born June 27, 1935) is an American former professional football player who played running back for four seasons for the Pittsburgh Steelers. He was drafted 20th overall in the second round of the 1958 NFL draft by the Steelers.
